= 2026 Galle Gallants season =

Lanka Premier League cricket team

Galle Gallants
2026 season
- Coach: Pubudu Dassanayake
- Captain: Dasun Shanaka
- League stage: 2nd place
- Qualifier 1: Lost to Jaffna Kings
- Qualifier 2: Won against Colombo Kaps
- Final: Won against Jaffna Kings
- Most runs: Sam Harper (425)
- Most wickets: Eshan Malinga (17)
- Most catches: Tharindu Rathnayake (8)
- Most wicket-keeping dismissals: Sam Harper (5)

The 2026 season was Galle Gallants' sixth appearance in the Lanka Premier League (LPL). They were one of the five cricket teams that competed in the 2026 LPL. The team was captained by Dasun Shanaka and coached by Pubudu Dassanayake. The team signed four players before the draft and sixteen players in the draft.

Galle Gallants finished in second place in the league stage, and advanced to Qualifier 1 in the playoffs. They lost Qualifier 1 to Jaffna Kings, but won Qualifier 2 against Colombo Kaps to qualify for their fourth final. In the final, they defeated Jaffna Kings to win their maiden LPL title. Sam Harper scored the most runs (425) while Eshan Malinga took the most wickets (17) for Galle in the 2026 season. Malinga was also the highest wicket-taker in the 2026 LPL.

== Pre-season ==
The 2026 Lanka Premier League was the 6th edition of the Lanka Premier League (LPL), a professional Twenty20 (T20) cricket league, organised by the Sri Lanka Cricket (SLC). The tournament featured five teams competing in 24 matches from 17 July to 8 August 2026.

Galle Gallants had previously been runners-up in three seasons including the previous season. Ahead of the season, the franchise was purchased by Gallant Sports and Media LLC, led by Kiran Mantripragada, and was renamed to Galle Gallants from Galle Marvels.

=== Players' draft ===
In January 2026, the SLC announced that instead of an auction a players' draft would be held ahead of the 2026 season. The players' draft was originally scheduled for 22 March 2026 but was postponed to 1 June 2026. Each team was allowed to sign two overseas and two domestic players before the draft. In the draft, each team was required to sign at least 14 players, with a maximum of 16 players under 10 categories, including 5 overseas players in 4 categories. One overseas player had to be from an associate country while two domestic players had to be under the age of 23.

Pre-draft direct signings
Category	Domestic	Overseas
Icon	Dasun Shanaka	Rassie van der Dussen
Star	Eshan Malinga	Litton Das (Note: Galle Gallants originally signed Sikandar Raza pre-draft, but due to his unavailability he was replaced by Litton Das.)

Players' draft signings
Category	Domestic	Overseas
Platinum	Charith Asalanka	Mohammad Nawaz
Gold	Pramod Madushan	Akif Javed
Gold	Lasith Croospulle	—N/a
Gold	Vijayakanth Viyaskanth	—N/a
Classic	Sahan Arachchige	Sam Harper
Classic	Chamika Karunaratne	Mehidy Hasan Miraz
Classic	Tharindu Rathnayake	—N/a
Emerging U23	Dinura Kalupahana	—N/a
Emerging U23	Yuri Koththigoda	—N/a
Associate Star	—N/a	Haider Ali
Optional Gold	Kasun Rajitha	—N/a
Optional Classic	Sachindu Colombage	—N/a

== Squad ==
- Players with international caps as of the start of the 2026 LPL are listed in **bold**.
- Ages are as of 17 July 2026.
- Withdrawn players are indicated by a dagger symbol (†) and placed at the bottom of the table.

Galle Gallants squad for the 2026 Lanka Premier League
S/N	Name	Nationality	Birth date	Batting style	Bowling style	Category	Notes
3	Tom Rogers	Australia	7 February 1999 (aged 27)	Left-handed	Right-arm medium	Overseas Classic	Overseas; replacement (Note: Tom Rogers replaced Mehidy Hasan Miraz, after the latter withdrew due to national duty.)
6	Sam Harper	Australia	10 December 1996 (aged 29)	Right-handed	—N/a	Overseas Classic	Overseas
7	**Dasun Shanaka**	Sri Lanka	9 September 1991 (aged 34)	Right-handed	Right-arm medium	Domestic Icon	Captain
18	**Nurul Hasan**	Bangladesh	21 November 1993 (aged 32)	Right-handed	—N/a	Overseas Star	Overseas; replacement (Note: Nurul Hasan replaced Litton Das, after the latter withdrew due to laft calf injury.)
21	**Mohammad Nawaz**	Pakistan	21 March 1994 (aged 32)	Left-handed	Slow left-arm orthodox	Overseas Platinum	Overseas
23	**Virandeep Singh**	Malaysia	23 March 1999 (aged 27)	Right-handed	Slow left-arm orthodox	Associate Star	Overseas; replacement (Note: Virandeep Singh replaced Haider Ali, after the latter withdrew due to national duty.)
27	**Tharindu Rathnayake**	Sri Lanka	18 April 1996 (aged 30)	Left-handed	Ambidextrous spin	Domestic Classic	
29	**Chamika Karunaratne**	Sri Lanka	29 May 1996 (aged 30)	Right-handed	Right-arm medium-fast	Domestic Classic	
35	Yuri Koththigoda	Sri Lanka	7 January 2006 (aged 20)	Left-handed	Slow left-arm orthodox	Emerging U23	
40	**Pramod Madushan**	Sri Lanka	14 December 1993 (aged 32)	Right-handed	Right-arm medium-fast	Domestic Gold	
43	**Sahan Arachchige**	Sri Lanka	13 May 1996 (aged 30)	Left-handed	Right-arm off break	Domestic Classic	
54	Sachindu Colombage	Sri Lanka	21 February 1998 (aged 28)	Right-handed	Right-arm leg break	Optional Classic	
55	**Vijayakanth Viyaskanth**	Sri Lanka	5 December 2001 (aged 24)	Right-handed	Right-arm leg break	Domestic Gold	
72	**Charith Asalanka**	Sri Lanka	29 June 1997 (aged 29)	Left-handed	Right-arm off break	Domestic Platinum	
76	Dinura Kalupahana	Sri Lanka	16 June 2005 (aged 21)	Right-handed	Right-arm medium	Emerging U23	
88	**Akif Javed**	Pakistan	10 October 2000 (aged 25)	Left-handed	Left-arm medium-fast	Overseas Gold	Overseas
97	**Eshan Malinga**	Sri Lanka	4 February 2001 (aged 25)	Left-handed	Right-arm fast	Domestic Star	
—N/a	**Lasith Croospulle**	Sri Lanka	4 October 1998 (aged 27)	Right-handed	Right-arm off break	Domestic Gold	
—N/a	**Chris Lynn**	Australia	10 April 1990 (aged 36)	Right-handed	Slow left-arm orthodox	Overseas Icon	Overseas; replacement (Note: Chris Lynn replaced Rassie van der Dussen, after the latter withdrew due to personal reasons.)
—N/a	**Kasun Rajitha**	Sri Lanka	1 June 1993 (aged 33)	Right-handed	Right-arm medium-fast	Optional Gold	
16	**Litton Das** †	Bangladesh	13 October 1994 (aged 31)	Right-handed	Right-arm off break	Overseas Star	Overseas; withdrawn
53	**Mehidy Hasan Miraz** †	Bangladesh	25 October 1997 (aged 28)	Right-handed	Right-arm off break	Overseas Classic	Overseas; withdrawn
72	**Rassie van der Dussen** †	South Africa	7 February 1989 (aged 37)	Right-handed	Right-arm leg break	Overseas Icon	Overseas; withdrawn
—N/a	**Haider Ali** †	United Arab Emirates	5 July 1994 (aged 32)	Left-handed	Slow left-arm orthodox	Associate Star	Overseas; withdrawn

== Support staff ==
Position	Name
Head coach	Pubudu Dassanayake
Bowling coach	Dinuk Hettiarachchi
Fielding coach	Gayan Wijekoon

== League stage ==
Galle Gallants began their season with two wins against Jaffna Kings and Colombo Kaps. Then they lost to Dambulla Sixers, won against Jaffna, lost to Kandy Royals, won against Dambulla, lost to Kandy and won against Colombo to finish the league stage at second place with ten points and advanced to Qualifier 1 in the playoffs.

=== Points table ===
League stage standings
Pos	Team	Pld	W	L	NR	Pts	NRR	Qualification
1	Jaffna Kings (R)	8	5	2	1	11	0.385	Advanced to Qualifier 1
2	Galle Gallants (C)	8	5	3	0	10	0.604	Advanced to Qualifier 1
3	Colombo Kaps	8	4	4	0	8	0.108	Advanced to Eliminator
4	Kandy Royals	8	3	5	0	6	−0.567	Advanced to Eliminator
5	Dambulla Sixers	8	2	5	1	5	−0.565	Eliminated

Source: Cricinfo
(C) Champions; (R) Runners-up

=== League progression ===
League progression
Team	Group matches								Playoffs		
Team	1	2	3	4	5	6	7	8	Q1/E	Q2	F
Galle Gallants	2	4	4	6	6	8	8	10	L	W	W

Win	Loss	No result

- Note: The total points at the end of each group match are listed.
- Note: Click on the points (group matches) or W/L (playoffs) to see the match summary.

=== Fixtures ===
Match 1
17 July 2026
19:30 (N)
Scorecard

Galle Gallants; 213/6 (20 overs)	v	Jaffna Kings; 177 (19.4 overs)
Charith Asalanka 65 (38); Lizaad Williams 2/28 (3 overs)		Dunith Wellalage 40 (24); Eshan Malinga 4/26 (3.4 overs)

Galle Gallants won by 36 runs
SSC Cricket Ground, Colombo
Umpires: Chamara de Soysa (SL) and Asif Yaqoob (Pak)
Player of the match: Charith Asalanka (Galle Gallants)

- Jaffna Kings won the toss and elected to field.
- This was the first LPL match played at this venue.

Match 3
18 July 2026
19:30 (N)
Scorecard

Colombo Kaps; 189/8 (20 overs)	v	Galle Gallants; 191/5 (19.2 overs)
Kusal Mendis 79 (53); Akif Javed 4/40 (4 overs)		Sam Harper 65 (45); Wanuja Sahan 3/19 (3 overs)

Galle Gallants won by 5 wickets
SSC Cricket Ground, Colombo
Umpires: Chandrika Amarasinghe (SL) and Raveendra Wimalasiri (SL)
Player of the match: Sam Harper (Galle Gallants)

- Galle Gallants won the toss and elected to field.

Match 8
22 July 2026
19:30 (N)
Scorecard

Galle Gallants; 178/8 (20 overs)	v	Dambulla Sixers; 180/4 (16.1 overs)
Chamika Karunaratne 45 (30); Fazalhaq Farooqi 3/39 (4 overs)		Reeza Hendricks 64* (37); Chamika Karunaratne 1/7 (1 over)

Dambulla Sixers won by 6 wickets
Rangiri Dambulla Stadium, Dambulla
Umpires: Chandrika Amarasinghe (SL) and Asif Yaqoob (Pak)
Player of the match: Reeza Hendricks (Dambulla Sixers)

- Dambulla Sixers won the toss and elected to field.

Match 10
23 July 2026
19:30 (N)
Scorecard

Galle Gallants; 193/8 (20 overs)	v	Jaffna Kings; 133 (17.5 overs)
Sahan Arachchige 63 (36); Dilshan Madushanka 2/35 (4 overs)		Dunith Wellalage 56 (39); Eshan Malinga 3/13 (4 overs)

Galle Gallants won by 60 runs
Rangiri Dambulla Stadium, Dambulla
Umpires: Chamara de Soysa (SL) and Asif Yaqoob (Pak)
Player of the match: Sahan Arachchige (Galle Gallants)

- Jaffna Kings won the toss and elected to field.

Match 11
25 July 2026
15:00 (D/N)
Scorecard

Kandy Royals; 165/6 (20 overs)	v	Galle Gallants; 154/8 (20 overs)
Moeen Ali 41 (29); Akif Javed 2/26 (4 overs)		Dasun Shanaka 57* (38); Nuwan Thushara 3/33 (4 overs)

Kandy Royals won by 11 runs
Rangiri Dambulla Stadium, Dambulla
Umpires: Ravindra Kottahachchi (SL) and Prageeth Rambukwella (SL)
Player of the match: Moeen Ali (Kandy Royals)

- Galle Gallants won the toss and elected to field.

Match 14
26 July 2026
19:30 (N)
Scorecard

Galle Gallants; 220/6 (20 overs)	v	Dambulla Sixers; 176/7 (20 overs)
Chamika Karunaratne 72* (34); Dushmantha Chameera 5/55 (4 overs)		Ramesh Mendis 39* (22); Sachindu Colombage 3/17 (4 overs)

Galle Gallants won by 44 runs
Rangiri Dambulla Stadium, Dambulla
Umpires: Chamara de Soysa (SL) and Ravindra Kottahachchi (SL)
Player of the match: Chamika Karunaratne (Galle Gallants)

- Galle Gallants won the toss and elected to bat.

Match 16
29 July 2026
15:00 (D/N)
Scorecard

Galle Gallants; 208/3 (20 overs)	v	Kandy Royals; 214/4 (18.5 overs)
Sam Harper 72 (38); Zahir Khan 2/25 (4 overs)		Lahiru Udara 132* (63); Sachindu Colombage 3/18 (4 overs)

Kandy Royals won by 6 wickets
Pallekele Cricket Stadium, Kandy
Umpires: Prageeth Rambukwella (SL) and Raveendra Wimalasiri (SL)
Player of the match: Lahiru Udara (Kandy Royals)

- Galle Gallants won the toss and elected to bat.
- Lahiru Udara (Kandy Royals) scored his maiden T20 century and scored the highest individual score in the LPL.

Match 19
1 August 2026
19:30 (N)
Scorecard

Galle Gallants; 201/6 (20 overs)	v	Colombo Kaps; 188 (19.4 overs)
Charith Asalanka 58 (37); Wanuja Sahan 2/28 (3 overs)		Ben McDermott 38 (28); Mohammad Nawaz 3/24 (4 overs)

Galle Gallants won by 13 runs
Pallekele Cricket Stadium, Kandy
Umpires: Wayne Knights (NZ) and Raveendra Wimalasiri (SL)
Player of the match: Charith Asalanka (Galle Gallants)

- Colombo Kaps won the toss and elected to field.

== Playoffs ==
=== Bracket ===
Qualifier 1
5 August 2026 – Colombo (RPS)
1	Jaffna Kings	242/2 (20 overs)
2	Galle Gallants	228/8 (20 overs)
Eliminator
5 August 2026 – Colombo (RPS)
3	Colombo Kaps	203/7 (20 overs)
4	Kandy Royals	135 (18.4 overs)

Qualifier 2
7 August 2026 – Colombo (RPS)
Q1L	Galle Gallants	177/4 (18.4 overs)
EW	Colombo Kaps	176 (18.5 overs)

Final
8 August 2026 – Colombo (RPS)
Q1W	Jaffna Kings	123 (19.3 overs)
Q2W	Galle Gallants	126/5 (15.5 overs)

=== Qualifier 1 ===
Qualifier 1
5 August 2026
15:00 (D/N)
Scorecard

Jaffna Kings; 242/2 (20 overs)	v	Galle Gallants; 228/8 (20 overs)
Kamil Mishara 108* (55); Akif Javed 1/46 (3 overs)		Sam Harper 44 (21); Mohamed Shiraz 3/32 (4 overs)

Jaffna Kings won by 14 runs
R. Premadasa Stadium, Colombo
Umpires: Kumar Dharmasena (SL) and Raveendra Wimalasiri (SL)
Player of the match: Kamil Mishara (Jaffna Kings)

- Galle Gallants won the toss and elected to field.
- Kamil Mishara (Jaffna Kings) scored his maiden T20 century.
- Jaffna Kings' 242 in this match was the highest innings total in the LPL, surpassing their own record of 240 in 2024.
- The 470 runs scored in this match was the highest match aggregate in the LPL, surpassing 454 runs between Kandy Falcons and Jaffna Kings in 2024.
- Jaffna Kings qualified for their second consecutive and fifth overall LPL final.

=== Qualifier 2 ===
Qualifier 2
7 August 2026
19:30 (N)
Scorecard

Colombo Kaps; 176 (18.5 overs)	v	Galle Gallants; 177/4 (18.4 overs)
Ravindu Fernando 48 (27); Charith Asalanka 2/34 (3 overs)		Sam Harper 77 (51); Ravindu Fernando 2/44 (4 overs)

Galle Gallants won by 6 wickets
R. Premadasa Stadium, Colombo
Umpires: Chamara de Soysa (SL) and Kumar Dharmasena (SL)
Player of the match: Sam Harper (Galle Gallants)

- Colombo Kaps won the toss and elected to bat.
- Galle Gallants qualified for their second consecutive and fourth overall LPL final.

=== Final ===
Final
8 August 2026
19:30 (N)
Scorecard

Jaffna Kings; 123 (19.3 overs)	v	Galle Gallants; 126/5 (15.5 overs)
Kamil Mishara 41 (32); Charith Asalanka 3/20 (4 overs)		Tom Rogers 34 (27); Traveen Mathew 2/15 (2 overs)

Galle Gallants won by 5 wickets
R. Premadasa Stadium, Colombo
Attendance: 21,000
Umpires: Kumar Dharmasena (SL) and Wayne Knights (NZ)
Player of the match: Charith Asalanka (Galle Gallants)

- Jaffna Kings won the toss and elected to bat.
- This was the second consecutive and fourth overall LPL final between Galle Gallants and Jaffna Kings.
- Galle Gallants won their maiden LPL title.

== Statistics ==
At the LPL end of season awards, Galle player Sam Harper was awarded for best sportsmanship.

Most runs
Runs	Player
425	Sam Harper
385	Charith Asalanka
253	Chamika Karunaratne
240	Sahan Arachchige
227	Dasun Shanaka

Most wickets
Wickets	Player
17	Eshan Malinga
15	Akif Javed
10	Sachindu Colombage
7	Tharindu Rathnayake
7	Mohammad Nawaz
