= 2026 Kandy Royals season =

Lanka Premier League cricket team

Kandy Royals
2026 season
- Coach: Chaminda Vaas
- Captain: Angelo Mathews
- League stage: 4th place
- Eliminator: Lost to Colombo Kaps
- Most runs: Lahiru Udara (434)
- Most wickets: Nuwan Thushara (14)
- Most catches: Wanindu Hasaranga (7)
- Most wicket-keeping dismissals: Lahiru Udara (5)

The 2026 season was Kandy Royals' sixth appearance in the Lanka Premier League (LPL). They were one of the five cricket teams that competed in the 2026 LPL. The team was captained by Angelo Mathews and coached by Chaminda Vaas. The team signed four players before the draft and sixteen players in the draft.

Kandy Royals finished in fourth place in the league stage, and advanced to Eliminator in the playoffs; which they lost to Colombo Kaps. Lahiru Udara scored the most runs (434) while Nuwan Thushara took the most wickets (14) for Kandy in the 2026 season. Udara was also the highest run-scorer in the 2026 LPL.

== Pre-season ==
The 2026 Lanka Premier League was the 6th edition of the Lanka Premier League (LPL), a professional Twenty20 (T20) cricket league, organised by the Sri Lanka Cricket (SLC). The tournament featured five teams competing in 24 matches from 17 July to 8 August 2026.

Kandy Royals had previously won the LPL title once in the 2023 season. The team finished in 3rd place in the previous season. Ahead of the season, the franchise was purchased by Sandhya Ajjarapu, a US-based investor and entrepreneur, and was renamed to Kandy Royals from Kandy Falcons.

=== Players' draft ===
In January 2026, the SLC announced that instead of an auction a players' draft would be held ahead of the 2026 season. The players' draft was originally scheduled for 22 March 2026 but was postponed to 1 June 2026. Each team was allowed to sign two overseas and two domestic players before the draft. In the draft, each team was required to sign at least 14 players, with a maximum of 16 players in 10 categories, including 5 overseas players in 4 categories. One overseas player had to be from an associate country while two domestic players had to be under the age of 23.

Pre-draft direct signings
Category	Domestic	Overseas
Icon	Wanindu Hasaranga	Moeen Ali
Star	Angelo Mathews	Vijay Shankar

Players' draft signings
Category	Domestic	Overseas
Platinum	Nuwan Thushara	Rahmanullah Gurbaz
Gold	Kusal Perera	Daniel Sams
Gold	Asitha Fernando	—N/a
Gold	Garuka Sanketh	—N/a
Classic	Vishen Halambage	Dale Phillips
Classic	Muditha Lakshan	Zahir Khan
Classic	Lahiru Udara	—N/a
Emerging U23	Sahan Mihira	—N/a
Emerging U23	Pavan Sandesh	—N/a
Associate Star	—N/a	Brandon McMullen
Optional Gold	Dushan Hemantha	—N/a
Optional Classic	Isitha Wijesundara	—N/a

== Squad ==
- Players with international caps as of the start of the 2026 LPL are listed in **bold**.
- Ages are as of 17 July 2026.
- Withdrawn players are indicated by a dagger symbol (†) and placed at the bottom of the table.

Kandy Royals squad for the 2026 Lanka Premier League
S/N	Name	Nationality	Birth date	Batting style	Bowling style	Category	Notes
10	**Shaheen Shah Afridi**	Pakistan	6 April 2000 (aged 26)	Left-handed	Left-arm fast	Overseas Gold	Overseas; replacement (Note: Shaheen Shah Afridi replaced Daniel Sams, after the latter withdrew due to personal reasons.)
15	Muditha Lakshan	Sri Lanka	20 December 2000 (aged 25)	Right-handed	Slow left-arm orthodox	Domestic Classic	
27	Pavan Sandesh	Sri Lanka	21 November 2003 (aged 22)	Right-handed	Right-arm medium-fast	Emerging U23	
32	**Lahiru Udara**	Sri Lanka	27 November 1993 (aged 32)	Right-handed	—N/a	Domestic Classic	
34	**Dushan Hemantha**	Sri Lanka	24 May 1994 (aged 32)	Right-handed	Right-arm leg break	Domestic Gold	
49	**Wanindu Hasaranga**	Sri Lanka	29 July 1997 (aged 28)	Right-handed	Right-arm leg break	Domestic Icon	
53	**Nuwan Thushara**	Sri Lanka	6 August 1994 (aged 31)	Right-handed	Right-arm medium-fast	Domestic Platinum	
59	**Vijay Shankar**	India	26 January 1991 (aged 35)	Right-handed	Right-arm medium	Overseas Star	Overseas
69	**Angelo Mathews**	Sri Lanka	2 June 1987 (aged 39)	Right-handed	Right-arm medium	Domestic Star	Captain
75	**Zahir Khan**	Afghanistan	20 December 1998 (aged 27)	Left-handed	Left-arm wrist spin	Overseas Classic	Overseas
78	**Asitha Fernando**	Sri Lanka	31 July 1997 (aged 28)	Right-handed	Right-arm medium-fast	Domestic Gold	
92	Garuka Sanketh	Sri Lanka	30 May 2005 (aged 21)	Left-handed	Right-arm medium	Domestic Gold	
95	**Dale Phillips**	New Zealand	15 October 1998 (aged 27)	Right-handed	Right-arm fast-medium	Overseas Classic	Overseas
153	**Kusal Perera**	Sri Lanka	17 August 1990 (aged 35)	Left-handed	—N/a	Domestic Gold	
—N/a	Kavija Gamage	Sri Lanka	27 March 2007 (aged 19)	Right-handed	Right-arm off break	Domestic Classic	Replacement (Note: Kavija Gamage replaced Vishen Halambage, after the latter withdrew due to hamstring injury.)
—N/a	Sahan Mihira	Sri Lanka	1 May 2004 (aged 22)	Right-handed	Right-arm medium-fast	Emerging U23	
—N/a	Isitha Wijesundara	Sri Lanka	11 May 1997 (aged 29)	Left-handed	Right-arm medium-fast	Domestic Classic	
6	Vishen Halambage †	Sri Lanka	19 January 2005 (aged 21)	Right-handed	Right-arm leg break	Domestic Classic	Withdrawn
8	**Brandon McMullen** †	Scotland	18 October 1999 (aged 26)	Right-handed	Right-arm medium	Associate Star	Overseas; withdrawn (Note: Brandon McMullen withdrew due to national duty.)
18	**Moeen Ali** †	England	18 June 1987 (aged 39)	Left-handed	Right-arm off break	Overseas Icon	Overseas; withdrawn (Note: Moeen Ali withdrew in early August, part way through the season, due to domestic commitments in England.)
21	**Rahmanullah Gurbaz** †	Afghanistan	28 November 2001 (aged 24)	Right-handed	Right-arm medium	Overseas Platinum	Overseas; withdrawn (Note: Sediqullah Atal replaced Rahmanullah Gurbaz, after the latter withdrew due to national duty.)
26	**Sediqullah Atal** †	Afghanistan	12 August 2001 (aged 24)	Left-handed	—N/a	Overseas Platinum	Overseas; replacement; withdrawn (Note: Sediqullah Atal withdrew due to national duty.)
—N/a	**Daniel Sams** †	Australia	27 October 1992 (aged 33)	Right-handed	Left-arm fast-medium	Overseas Gold	Overseas; withdrawn

== Support staff ==
Position	Name
Head coach	Chaminda Vaas
Bowling coach	Dhammika Prasad
Fielding coach	Upul Chandana

== League stage ==
Kandy Royals began their season with two losses to Dambulla Sixers and Colombo Kaps. They won their next match against Dambulla but lost to Colombo again. They won their next match against Galle Gallants but lost to Jaffna Kings. They won their next match against Galle but lost to Jaffna again and finished the league stage at fourth place with six points and advanced to Eliminator in the playoffs.

=== Points table ===
League stage standings
Pos	Team	Pld	W	L	NR	Pts	NRR	Qualification
1	Jaffna Kings (R)	8	5	2	1	11	0.385	Advanced to Qualifier 1
2	Galle Gallants (C)	8	5	3	0	10	0.604	Advanced to Qualifier 1
3	Colombo Kaps	8	4	4	0	8	0.108	Advanced to Eliminator
4	Kandy Royals	8	3	5	0	6	−0.567	Advanced to Eliminator
5	Dambulla Sixers	8	2	5	1	5	−0.565	Eliminated

Source: Cricinfo
(C) Champions; (R) Runners-up

=== League progression ===
League progression
Team	Group matches								Playoffs		
Team	1	2	3	4	5	6	7	8	Q1/E	Q2	F
Kandy Royals	0	0	2	2	4	4	6	6	L		

Win	Loss	No result

- Note: The total points at the end of each group match are listed.
- Note: Click on the points (group matches) or W/L (playoffs) to see the match summary.

=== Fixtures ===
Match 2
18 July 2026
15:00 (D/N)
Scorecard

Dambulla Sixers; 205/6 (20 overs)	v	Kandy Royals; 187/6 (20 overs)
Reeza Hendricks 87* (50); Dushan Hemantha 2/26 (4 overs)		Dale Phillips 52 (39); Gulbadin Naib 2/19 (2 overs)

Dambulla Sixers won by 18 runs
SSC Cricket Ground, Colombo
Umpires: Hemantha Boteju (SL) and Ravindra Kottahachchi (SL)
Player of the match: Reeza Hendricks (Dambulla Sixers)

- Dambulla Sixers won the toss and elected to bat.
- Reeza Hendricks and Gulbadin Naib (Dambulla Sixers) recorded the highest partnership for the 7th wicket (94* runs) in the LPL.

Match 5
19 July 2026
19:30 (N)
Scorecard

Kandy Royals; 179 (20 overs)	v	Colombo Kaps; 182/4 (19.4 overs)
Lahiru Udara 53 (36); Binura Fernando 4/45 (4 overs)		Janith Liyanage 53* (32); Wanindu Hasaranga 2/29 (4 overs)

Colombo Kaps won by 6 wickets
SSC Cricket Ground, Colombo
Umpires: Shantha Fonseka (SL) and Asif Yaqoob (Pak)
Player of the match: Janith Liyanage (Colombo Kaps)

- Colombo Kaps won the toss and elected to field.

Match 6
21 July 2026
19:30 (N)
Scorecard

Kandy Royals; 194/6 (20 overs)	v	Dambulla Sixers; 151/8 (20 overs)
Lahiru Udara 51 (34); Fazalhaq Farooqi 2/20 (4 overs)		Sahibzada Farhan 74 (45); Nuwan Thushara 4/29 (4 overs)

Kandy Royals won by 43 runs
Rangiri Dambulla Stadium, Dambulla
Umpires: Chamara de Soysa (SL) and Asif Yaqoob (Pak)
Player of the match: Wanindu Hasaranga (Kandy Royals)

- Dambulla Sixers won the toss and elected to field.

Match 9
23 July 2026
15:00 (D/N)
Scorecard

Colombo Kaps; 192/9 (20 overs)	v	Kandy Royals; 169/8 (20 overs)
Rubin Hermann 53 (36); Dushan Hemantha 2/20 (2 overs)		Angelo Mathews 39* (24); Mujeeb Ur Rahman 3/34 (4 overs)

Colombo Kaps won by 23 runs
Rangiri Dambulla Stadium, Dambulla
Umpires: Hemantha Boteju (SL) and Asif Yaqoob (Pak)
Player of the match: Janith Liyanage (Colombo Kaps)

- Kandy Royals won the toss and elected to field.

Match 11
25 July 2026
15:00 (D/N)
Scorecard

Kandy Royals; 165/6 (20 overs)	v	Galle Gallants; 154/8 (20 overs)
Moeen Ali 41 (29); Akif Javed 2/26 (4 overs)		Dasun Shanaka 57* (38); Nuwan Thushara 3/33 (4 overs)

Kandy Royals won by 11 runs
Rangiri Dambulla Stadium, Dambulla
Umpires: Ravindra Kottahachchi (SL) and Prageeth Rambukwella (SL)
Player of the match: Moeen Ali (Kandy Royals)

- Galle Gallants won the toss and elected to field.

Match 13
26 July 2026
15:00 (D/N)
Scorecard

Jaffna Kings; 199/4 (20 overs)	v	Kandy Royals; 106 (18.2 overs)
Kamil Mishara 78 (53); Shaheen Shah Afridi 3/27 (4 overs)		Lahiru Udara 54 (41); Mohamed Shiraz 3/18 (3.2 overs)

Jaffna Kings won by 93 runs
Rangiri Dambulla Stadium, Dambulla
Umpires: Rasanja Dulsiri (SL) and Prageeth Rambukwella (SL)
Player of the match: Kamil Mishara (Jaffna Kings)

- Jaffna Kings won the toss and elected to bat.

Match 16
29 July 2026
15:00 (D/N)
Scorecard

Galle Gallants; 208/3 (20 overs)	v	Kandy Royals; 214/4 (18.5 overs)
Sam Harper 72 (38); Zahir Khan 2/25 (4 overs)		Lahiru Udara 132* (63); Sachindu Colombage 3/18 (4 overs)

Kandy Royals won by 6 wickets
Pallekele Cricket Stadium, Kandy
Umpires: Prageeth Rambukwella (SL) and Raveendra Wimalasiri (SL)
Player of the match: Lahiru Udara (Kandy Royals)

- Galle Gallants won the toss and elected to bat.
- Lahiru Udara (Kandy Royals) scored his maiden T20 century and scored the highest individual score in the LPL.

Match 18
30 July 2026
19:30 (N)
Scorecard

Jaffna Kings; 221/6 (20 overs)	v	Kandy Royals; 200 (20 overs)
Kamil Mishara 49 (26); Wanindu Hasaranga 2/37 (4 overs)		Pavan Sandesh 48 (21); Dunith Wellalage 3/11 (2 overs)

Jaffna Kings won by 21 runs
Pallekele Cricket Stadium, Kandy
Umpires: Prageeth Rambukwella (SL) and Wayne Knights (NZ)
Player of the match: Chamindu Wickramasinghe (Jaffna Kings)

- Kandy Royals won the toss and elected to field.

== Playoffs ==
=== Bracket ===
Qualifier 1
5 August 2026 – Colombo (RPS)
1	Jaffna Kings	242/2 (20 overs)
2	Galle Gallants	228/8 (20 overs)
Eliminator
5 August 2026 – Colombo (RPS)
3	Colombo Kaps	203/7 (20 overs)
4	Kandy Royals	135 (18.4 overs)

Qualifier 2
7 August 2026 – Colombo (RPS)
Q1L	Galle Gallants	177/4 (18.4 overs)
EW	Colombo Kaps	176 (18.5 overs)

Final
8 August 2026 – Colombo (RPS)
Q1W	Jaffna Kings	123 (19.3 overs)
Q2W	Galle Gallants	126/5 (15.5 overs)

=== Eliminator ===
Eliminator
5 August 2026
19:30 (N)
Scorecard

Colombo Kaps; 203/7 (20 overs)	v	Kandy Royals; 135 (18.4 overs)
Ben McDermott 71 (39); Nuwan Thushara 2/31 (4 overs)		Lahiru Udara 50 (36); Wanuja Sahan 2/8 (4 overs)

Colombo Kaps won by 68 runs
R. Premadasa Stadium, Colombo
Umpires: Ravindra Kottahachchi (SL) and Wayne Knights (NZ)
Player of the match: Wanuja Sahan (Colombo Kaps)

- Colombo Kaps won the toss and elected to bat.

== Statistics ==
Most runs
Runs	Player
434	Lahiru Udara
184	Angelo Mathews
150	Vijay Shankar
149	Dale Phillips
129	Moeen Ali

Most wickets
Wickets	Player
14	Nuwan Thushara
9	Shaheen Shah Afridi
7	Dushan Hemantha
6	Wanindu Hasaranga
5	2 players
