= 2026 Jaffna Kings season =

Lanka Premier League cricket team

Jaffna Kings
2026 season
- Coach: Thilina Kandamby
- Captain: Bhanuka Rajapaksa
- League stage: 1st place
- Qualifier 1: Won against Galle Gallants
- Final: Lost to Galle Gallants
- Most runs: Kamil Mishara (411)
- Most wickets: Lizaad Williams (16)
- Most catches: Chamindu Wickramasinghe (8)
- Most wicket-keeping dismissals: Kamil Mishara (11)

The 2026 season was Jaffna Kings' sixth appearance in the Lanka Premier League (LPL). They were one of the five cricket teams that competed in the 2026 LPL. The team was captained by Bhanuka Rajapaksa and coached by Thilina Kandamby. The team signed four players before the draft and fifteen players in the draft.

Jaffna Kings finished in first place in the league stage and advanced to Qualifier 1 in the playoffs. They won Qualifier 1 against Galle Gallants to qualify for their fifth final. However, in the final, they lost to Galle Gallants for the first time. Kamil Mishara scored the most runs (411) while Lizaad Williams took the most wickets (11) for Jaffna in the 2026 season.

== Pre-season ==
The 2026 Lanka Premier League was the 6th edition of the Lanka Premier League (LPL), a professional Twenty20 (T20) cricket league, organised by Sri Lanka Cricket (SLC). The tournament featured five teams competing in 24 matches from 17 July to 8 August 2026.

Jaffna Kings are the most successful franchise in the league with 4 LPL titles. They were also the defending champions, having won their fourth title the previous season. In October 2025, the SLC terminated Lyca Mobile's ownership of the franchise for failing to fulfill contractual obligations. The franchise was then purchased by Sports Commune, led by Indian sports entrepreneurs Manjot Kalra and Mayank Goel.

In 17 July 2026, hours before the opening match of the season, Manjot Kalra, co-owner of the franchise via Sports Commune, was arrested by Sri Lanka's Special Investigation Unit (SIU) for the Prevention of Offences Relating to Sports in connection with an anti-corruption investigation. In 23 July, Sports Commune's ownership of the franchise was terminated. To stabilise the franchise, the SLC and the league's commercial rights holder, the IPG Group, assumed full operational control of the team and took over all personnel contracts. In 4 August, a day before the playoffs, the franchise was acquired by Anchor Sports, a Stockholm-based sports group co-owned by entrepreneur Nagendra Siddoutam and former Indian fast bowler Zaheer Khan.

=== Players' draft ===
In January 2026, the SLC announced that instead of an auction, a players' draft would be held ahead of the 2026 season. The players' draft was originally scheduled for 22 March 2026, but was postponed to 1 June 2026. Each team was allowed to sign two overseas and two domestic players before the draft. In the draft, each team was required to sign at least 14 players, with a maximum of 16 players under 10 categories, including 5 overseas players in 4 categories. One overseas player had to be from an associate country, while two domestic players had to be under the age of 23.

Pre-draft direct signings
Category	Domestic	Overseas
Icon	Bhanuka Rajapaksa	Shakib Al Hasan
Star	Dunith Wellalage	Taskin Ahmed

Players' draft signings
Category	Domestic	Overseas
Platinum	Avishka Fernando	David Wiese
Gold	Dilshan Madushanka	Ibrahim Zadran
Gold	Kamil Mishara	—N/a
Gold	Traveen Mathew	—N/a
Classic	Mohamed Shiraz	Sandeep Lamichhane
Classic	Chamindu Wickramasinghe	Lizaad Williams
Classic	Nuwanidu Fernando	—N/a
Emerging U23	Kugathas Mathulan	—N/a
Emerging U23	Praveen Manisha	—N/a
Associate Star	—N/a	Dipendra Singh Airee
Optional Gold	Nishan Madushka	—N/a
Optional Classic	—N/a	—N/a

== Squad ==
- Players with international caps as of the start of the 2026 LPL are listed in **bold**.
- Ages are as of 17 July 2026.
- Withdrawn players are indicated by a dagger symbol (†) and placed at the bottom of the table.

Jaffna Kings squad for the 2026 Lanka Premier League
S/N	Name	Nationality	Birth date	Batting style	Bowling style	Category	Notes
6	Mohamed Shiraz	Sri Lanka	13 February 1995 (aged 31)	Right-handed	Right-arm medium-fast	Domestic Classic	
9	Dunith Wellalage	Sri Lanka	9 January 2003 (aged 23)	Left-handed	Slow left-arm orthodox	Domestic Star	
16	Zahoor Khan	United Arab Emirates	25 May 1989 (aged 37)	Right-handed	Right-arm medium-fast	Associate Star	Overseas; replacement (Note: Zahoor Khan replaced Dipendra Singh Airee after the latter withdrew due to national duty.)
22	Chamindu Wickramasinghe	Sri Lanka	6 September 2002 (aged 23)	Left-handed	Right-arm medium-fast	Domestic Classic	
24	Nishan Madushka	Sri Lanka	10 September 1999 (aged 26)	Right-handed	—N/a	Optional Gold	
25	Sandeep Lamichhane	Nepal	2 August 2000 (aged 25)	Right-handed	Right-arm leg break	Overseas Classic	Overseas
27	Nuwanidu Fernando	Sri Lanka	13 October 1999 (aged 26)	Right-handed	Right-arm off break	Domestic Classic	
28	Avishka Fernando	Sri Lanka	5 April 1998 (aged 28)	Right-handed	Right-arm off break	Domestic Platinum	
36	Khawaja Nafay	Pakistan	13 February 2002 (aged 24)	Right-handed	Right-arm off break	Overseas Gold	Overseas; replacement (Note: Khawaja Nafay replaced Ibrahim Zadran after the latter withdrew due to national duty.)
42	Kamil Mishara	Sri Lanka	24 April 2001 (aged 25)	Left-handed	Right-arm off break	Domestic Gold	
46	Praveen Maneesha	Sri Lanka	12 November 2005 (aged 20)	Right-handed	Right-arm leg break	Emerging U23	
50	Lizaad Williams	South Africa	1 October 1993 (aged 32)	Left-handed	Right-arm medium-fast	Overseas Classic	Overseas
54	Bhanuka Rajapaksa	Sri Lanka	24 October 1991 (aged 34)	Left-handed	Right-arm medium-fast	Domestic Icon	Captain
75	Shakib Al Hasan	Bangladesh	24 March 1987 (aged 39)	Left-handed	Slow left-arm orthodox	Overseas Icon	Overseas
77	Tawhid Hridoy	Bangladesh	4 December 2000 (aged 25)	Right-handed	Right-arm off break	Overseas Star	Overseas; replacement (Note: Tawhid Hridoy replaced Taskin Ahmed after the latter withdrew due to national duty.)
79	Traveen Mathew	Sri Lanka	14 June 2004 (aged 22)	Right-handed	Right-arm off break	Domestic Gold	
96	David Wiese	Namibia	18 May 1985 (aged 41)	Right-handed	Right-arm medium-fast	Overseas Platinum	Overseas
98	Dilshan Madushanka	Sri Lanka	18 September 2000 (aged 25)	Right-handed	Left-arm medium-fast	Domestic Gold	
—N/a	Kugathas Mathulan	Sri Lanka	3 May 2007 (aged 19)	Right-handed	Right-arm medium-fast	Emerging U23	
3	Taskin Ahmed †	Bangladesh	3 April 1995 (aged 31)	Left-handed	Right-arm fast	Overseas Star	Overseas; withdrawn
18	Ibrahim Zadran †	Afghanistan	12 December 2001 (aged 24)	Right-handed	Right-arm medium-fast	Overseas Gold	Overseas; withdrawn
45	Dipendra Singh Airee †	Nepal	24 January 2000 (aged 26)	Right-handed	Right-arm off break	Associate Star	Overseas; withdrawn

== Support staff ==
Position	Name
Head coach	Thilina Kandamby
Bowling coach	Dharshana Gamage
Fielding coach	Manoj Abayawickrama

== League stage ==
Jaffna Kings began their season with a loss to Galle Gallants. They won their next two matches against Dambulla Sixers and Colombo Kaps, but lost to Galle again. They won their next three matches against Kandy Royals, Colombo and Kandy again. Their last league stage match of the season against Dambulla was cancelled midway due to rain, and both teams were awarded a point each. They finished the stage in first place with eleven points and advanced to Qualifier 1 in the playoffs.

=== Points table ===
League stage standings
Pos	Team	Pld	W	L	NR	Pts	NRR	Qualification
1	Jaffna Kings (R)	8	5	2	1	11	0.385	Advanced to Qualifier 1
2	Galle Gallants (C)	8	5	3	0	10	0.604	Advanced to Qualifier 1
3	Colombo Kaps	8	4	4	0	8	0.108	Advanced to Eliminator
4	Kandy Royals	8	3	5	0	6	−0.567	Advanced to Eliminator
5	Dambulla Sixers	8	2	5	1	5	−0.565	Eliminated

Source: Cricinfo
(C) Champions; (R) Runners-up

=== League progression ===
League progression
Team	Group matches								Playoffs		
Team	1	2	3	4	5	6	7	8	Q1/E	Q2	F
Jaffna Kings	0	2	4	4	6	8	10	11	W		L

Win	Loss	No result

- Note: The total points at the end of each group match are listed.
- Note: Click on the points (group matches) or W/L (playoffs) to see the match summary.

=== Fixtures ===
Match 1
17 July 2026
19:30 (N)
Scorecard

Galle Gallants; 213/6 (20 overs)	v	Jaffna Kings; 177 (19.4 overs)
Charith Asalanka 65 (38); Lizaad Williams 2/28 (3 overs)		Dunith Wellalage 40 (24); Eshan Malinga 4/26 (3.4 overs)

Galle Gallants won by 36 runs
SSC Cricket Ground, Colombo
Umpires: Chamara de Soysa (SL) and Asif Yaqoob (Pak)
Player of the match: Charith Asalanka (Galle Gallants)

- Jaffna Kings won the toss and elected to field.
- This was the first LPL match played at this venue.

Match 4
19 July 2026
15:00 (D/N)
Scorecard

Dambulla Sixers; 130 (19.3 overs)	v	Jaffna Kings; 133/5 (19 overs)
Pavan Rathnayake 27 (16); Lizaad Williams 3/14 (2.3 overs)		Bhanuka Rajapaksa 61* (37); Dushmantha Chameera 2/29 (4 overs)

Jaffna Kings won by 5 wickets
SSC Cricket Ground, Colombo
Umpires: Asanka Nanayakkara (SL) and Prageeth Rambukwella (SL)
Player of the match: Bhanuka Rajapaksa (Jaffna Kings)

- Jaffna Kings won the toss and elected to field.

Match 7
22 July 2026
15:00 (D/N)
Scorecard

Jaffna Kings; 179/6 (20 overs)	v	Colombo Kaps; 174/9 (20 overs)
Chamindu Wickramasinghe 43 (22); Shahnawaz Dahani 2/25 (4 overs)		Kamindu Mendis 58 (42); Lizaad Williams 3/30 (4 overs)

Jaffna Kings won by 5 runs
Rangiri Dambulla Stadium, Dambulla
Umpires: Chamara de Soysa (SL) and Rasanja Dulsiri (SL)
Player of the match: Chamindu Wickramasinghe (Jaffna Kings)

- Colombo Kaps won the toss and elected to field.

Match 10
23 July 2026
19:30 (N)
Scorecard

Galle Gallants; 193/8 (20 overs)	v	Jaffna Kings; 133 (17.5 overs)
Sahan Arachchige 63 (36); Dilshan Madushanka 2/35 (4 overs)		Dunith Wellalage 56 (39); Eshan Malinga 3/13 (4 overs)

Galle Gallants won by 60 runs
Rangiri Dambulla Stadium, Dambulla
Umpires: Chamara de Soysa (SL) and Asif Yaqoob (Pak)
Player of the match: Sahan Arachchige (Galle Gallants)

- Jaffna Kings won the toss and elected to field.

Match 13
26 July 2026
15:00 (D/N)
Scorecard

Jaffna Kings; 199/4 (20 overs)	v	Kandy Royals; 106 (18.2 overs)
Kamil Mishara 78 (53); Shaheen Shah Afridi 3/27 (4 overs)		Lahiru Udara 54 (41); Mohamed Shiraz 3/18 (3.2 overs)

Jaffna Kings won by 93 runs
Rangiri Dambulla Stadium, Dambulla
Umpires: Rasanja Dulsiri (SL) and Prageeth Rambukwella (SL)
Player of the match: Kamil Mishara (Jaffna Kings)

- Jaffna Kings won the toss and elected to bat.

Match 15
28 July 2026
19:30 (N)
Scorecard

Jaffna Kings; 202/5 (20 overs)	v	Colombo Kaps; 183/9 (20 overs)
Ibrahim Zadran 95 (65); James Neesham 2/30 (4 overs)		Sadeera Samarawickrama 44 (36); Dilshan Madushanka 3/30 (4 overs)

Jaffna Kings won by 19 runs
Pallekele Cricket Stadium, Kandy
Umpires: Ravindra Kottahachchi (SL) and Raveendra Wimalasiri (SL)
Player of the match: Ibrahim Zadran (Jaffna Kings)

- Colombo Kaps won the toss and elected to field.
- Shahnawaz Dahani (Colombo Kaps) recorded the most expensive bowling figures in the LPL (0/71).

Match 18
30 July 2026
19:30 (N)
Scorecard

Jaffna Kings; 221/6 (20 overs)	v	Kandy Royals; 200 (20 overs)
Kamil Mishara 49 (26); Wanindu Hasaranga 2/37 (4 overs)		Pavan Sandesh 48 (21); Dunith Wellalage 3/11 (2 overs)

Jaffna Kings won by 21 runs
Pallekele Cricket Stadium, Kandy
Umpires: Prageeth Rambukwella (SL) and Wayne Knights (NZ)
Player of the match: Chamindu Wickramasinghe (Jaffna Kings)

- Kandy Royals won the toss and elected to field.

Match 20
2 August 2026
19:30 (N)
Scorecard

Dambulla Sixers; 203/8 (20 overs)	v	Jaffna Kings
Pavan Rathnayake 47 (28); Dilshan Madushanka 3/32 (4 overs)

No result
Pallekele Cricket Stadium, Kandy
Umpires: Kumar Dharmasena (SL) and Wayne Knights (NZ)

- Jaffna Kings won the toss and elected to field.
- No further play was possible due to rain.

== Playoffs ==
=== Bracket ===
Qualifier 1
5 August 2026 – Colombo (RPS)
1	Jaffna Kings	242/2 (20 overs)
2	Galle Gallants	228/8 (20 overs)
Eliminator
5 August 2026 – Colombo (RPS)
3	Colombo Kaps	203/7 (20 overs)
4	Kandy Royals	135 (18.4 overs)

Qualifier 2
7 August 2026 – Colombo (RPS)
Q1L	Galle Gallants	177/4 (18.4 overs)
EW	Colombo Kaps	176 (18.5 overs)

Final
8 August 2026 – Colombo (RPS)
Q1W	Jaffna Kings	123 (19.3 overs)
Q2W	Galle Gallants	126/5 (15.5 overs)

=== Qualifier 1 ===
Qualifier 1
5 August 2026
15:00 (D/N)
Scorecard

Jaffna Kings; 242/2 (20 overs)	v	Galle Gallants; 228/8 (20 overs)
Kamil Mishara 108* (55); Akif Javed 1/46 (3 overs)		Sam Harper 44 (21); Mohamed Shiraz 3/32 (4 overs)

Jaffna Kings won by 14 runs
R. Premadasa Stadium, Colombo
Umpires: Kumar Dharmasena (SL) and Raveendra Wimalasiri (SL)
Player of the match: Kamil Mishara (Jaffna Kings)

- Galle Gallants won the toss and elected to field.
- Kamil Mishara (Jaffna Kings) scored his maiden T20 century.
- Jaffna Kings' 242 in this match was the highest innings total in the LPL, surpassing their own record of 240 in 2024.
- The 470 runs scored in this match was the highest match aggregate in the LPL, surpassing 454 runs between Kandy Falcons and Jaffna Kings in 2024.
- Jaffna Kings qualified for their second consecutive and fifth overall LPL final.

=== Final ===
Final
8 August 2026
19:30 (N)
Scorecard

Jaffna Kings; 123 (19.3 overs)	v	Galle Gallants; 126/5 (15.5 overs)
Kamil Mishara 41 (32); Charith Asalanka 3/20 (4 overs)		Tom Rogers 34 (27); Traveen Mathew 2/15 (2 overs)

Galle Gallants won by 5 wickets
R. Premadasa Stadium, Colombo
Attendance: 21,000
Umpires: Kumar Dharmasena (SL) and Wayne Knights (NZ)
Player of the match: Charith Asalanka (Galle Gallants)

- Jaffna Kings won the toss and elected to bat.
- This was the second consecutive and fourth overall LPL final between Galle Gallants and Jaffna Kings.
- Galle Gallants won their maiden LPL title.

== Statistics ==
At the LPL end of season awards, Jaffna players Kamil Mishara and Traveen Mathew were recognised as player of the tournament and emerging player of the tournament, respectively.

Most runs
Runs	Player
411	Kamil Mishara
232	Avishka Fernando
162	Dunith Wellalage
157	Chamindu Wickramasinghe
156	Ibrahim Zadran

Most wickets
Wickets	Player
16	Lizaad Williams
14	Dunith Wellalage
14	Dilshan Madushanka
11	Shakib Al Hasan
9	2 players
