= 2026 Lanka Premier League =

Twenty20 cricket tournament

- Dates: 17 July – 8 August 2026
- Administrator: Sri Lanka Cricket
- Cricket format: Twenty20
- Tournament format(s): Double round-robin and playoffs
- Champions: Galle Gallants (1st title)
- Runners-up: Jaffna Kings
- Participants: 5
- Matches: 24
- Player of the series: Kamil Mishara (Jaffna Kings)
- Most runs: Lahiru Udara (Kandy Royals) (434)
- Most wickets: Eshan Malinga (Galle Gallants) (17)
- Official website: lankapremierleaguet20.com

The 2026 Lanka Premier League, also known as LPL 6, was the sixth edition of the Lanka Premier League, a professional Twenty20 cricket league. The tournament featured 5 teams competing in 24 matches from 17 July to 8 August across 4 venues.

Defending champions Jaffna Kings were defeated in the final by Galle Gallants, who went on to win their maiden title. Lahiru Udara of Kandy Royals scored the most runs (434), while Eshan Malinga of Galle took the most wickets (17). Kamil Mishara of Jaffna was named as the player of the tournament.

== Background ==
The Lanka Premier League (LPL) is a professional Twenty20 (T20) cricket league, organised by Sri Lanka Cricket (SLC). It has been held annually since the 2020 with the exception of 2025. Jaffna Kings were the defending champions, having won their fourth title the previous season, defeating Galle Marvels in the final by nine wickets.

=== Format ===
In the league stage, each team played twice against each other teams in a double round-robin format for a total of twenty matches. After the league stage, the top four teams, based on aggregate points, advanced to the playoffs. In this stage, the top two teams competed with each other (in a match titled "Qualifier 1"), as did the remaining two teams (in a match titled "Eliminator"). While the winner of Qualifier 1 directly qualified for the final match, the losing team had another chance to qualify for the final match by competing against the winning team of Eliminator (in a match titled "Qualifier 2"). The winner of this subsequent Qualifier 2 advanced to the final match.

=== Schedule ===
The sixth season of the LPL was initially scheduled to take place across three venues in its usual November–December window, from 27 November to 23 December 2025. However, on 22 October 2025, the SLC announced that the season would be delayed to allow for the venues to be prepared for the then-upcoming 2026 Men's T20 World Cup, which was held in India and Sri Lanka from 7 February to 8 March 2026. On 1 December 2025, the SLC announced a tentative schedule of 8 July to 8 August 2026, shifting to a mid-year window. The schedule was later revised to take place from 10 July to 5 August 2026, before being finalised to take place from 17 July to 8 August 2026.

=== Marketing ===
The Caribbean cricketer Chris Gayle was announced as the brand ambassador for the 2026 LPL.

=== Broadcasting ===
On 20 May 2026, SLTMobitel's Peo TV and the IPG Group announced a partnership to handle the media and broadcast rights for the 2026 LPL. The season was also broadcast on the Star Sports network.

== Teams ==
Team captains during a promotional event for the 2026 LPL

| Team | 2024 performance | Head coach | Captain |
|---|---|---|---|
| Colombo Kaps | 4th | Chamara Kapugedera | Kamindu Mendis (Note: Kamindu Mendis took over as the captain after Kusal Mendis withdrew due to a hamstring injury.) |
| Dambulla Sixers | 5th | Rangana Herath | Dinesh Chandimal |
| Galle Gallants | Runner-up | Pubudu Dassanayake | Dasun Shanaka |
| Jaffna Kings | Champions | Thilina Kandamby | Bhanuka Rajapaksa |
| Kandy Royals | 3rd | Chaminda Vaas | Angelo Mathews |

=== Franchise changes ===
In October 2025, the SLC terminated both the Colombo Strikers and Jaffna Kings franchises for failing to fulfill contractual obligations. The Colombo franchise was purchased by Witness Sports Alliance LLC, led by Indian entrepreneurs Saranyan Palaniswamy and K.C. Shyam Kangayan, and was renamed Colombo Kaps, while the Jaffna franchise was purchased by Sports Commune, led by Indian sports entrepreneurs Manjot Kalra and Mayank Goel. Additionally, the Galle franchise was purchased by Gallant Sports and Media LLC, led by Kiran Mantripragada, and was renamed Galle Gallants, while the Kandy franchise was purchased by Sandhya Ajjarapu, a US-based investor and entrepreneur, and was renamed Kandy Royals.

==== Jaffna franchise ownership ====
On 17 July 2026, hours before the opening match of the season, Manjot Kalra, co-owner of the Jaffna franchise via Sports Commune, was arrested by Sri Lanka's Special Investigation Unit (SIU) for the Prevention of Offences Relating to Sports in connection with an anti-corruption investigation. The SLC stated that it would fully cooperate with the investigation and reiterated its zero-tolerance policy towards corruption, while confirming that the tournament would continue as planned. On 23 July, Sports Commune's ownership of the franchise was terminated. To stabilize the franchise, the SLC and the league's commercial rights holder, the IPG Group, assumed full operational control of the team and took over all personnel contracts. On 4 August, a day before the playoffs, the franchise was acquired by Anchor Sports, a Stockholm-based sports group co-owned by entrepreneur Nagendra Siddoutam and former Indian fast bowler Zaheer Khan.

=== Players' draft ===
In January 2026, the SLC announced that instead of an auction, a players' draft would be held ahead of the 2026 season. The players' draft was originally scheduled for 22 March 2026, but was postponed to 1 June 2026. Overseas player registrations commenced on 8 May, and over 650 players from 21 countries registered for the draft and 310 were shortlisted. Twenty players including ten overseas players were directly signed before the draft. A total of 77 players including 25 overseas players were signed during the draft.

== Venues ==
The league stage was played across 3 stadiums across Sri Lanka: SSC Cricket Ground in Colombo, Rangiri Dambulla Stadium in Dambulla and Pallekele Cricket Stadium in Kandy. The playoff matches including the final were played at R. Premadasa Stadium in Colombo.

| A map of Sri Lanka with pin-points on 2026 Lanka Premier League venues | Colombo | |
|---|---|---|
| A map of Sri Lanka with pin-points on 2026 Lanka Premier League venues | R. Premadasa Stadium | SSC Cricket Ground |
| A map of Sri Lanka with pin-points on 2026 Lanka Premier League venues | Capacity: 35,000 | Capacity: 10,000 |
| A map of Sri Lanka with pin-points on 2026 Lanka Premier League venues | R. Premadasa Stadium in 2014 | SSC Cricket Ground in 2001 |
| A map of Sri Lanka with pin-points on 2026 Lanka Premier League venues | Dambulla | Kandy |
| A map of Sri Lanka with pin-points on 2026 Lanka Premier League venues | Rangiri Dambulla Stadium | Pallekele Cricket Stadium |
| A map of Sri Lanka with pin-points on 2026 Lanka Premier League venues | Capacity: 16,800 | Capacity: 35,000 |
| A map of Sri Lanka with pin-points on 2026 Lanka Premier League venues | Rangiri Dambulla Stadium in 2024 | Pallekele Cricket Stadium in 2012 |

== Match officials ==
On 30 June 2026, the SLC announced the list of match referees and umpires for the tournament.

Match referees

- (Sri Lanka) Ranjan Madugalle
- (Sri Lanka) Graeme Labrooy
- (Sri Lanka) Wendell Labrooy
- (Sri Lanka) Manoj Mendis
- (Sri Lanka) Pradeep Jayaprakashdaran

Umpires

- (Sri Lanka) Kumar Dharmasena
- (New Zealand) Wayne Knights
- (Pakistan) Asif Yaqoob
- (Sri Lanka) Raveendra Wimalasiri
- (Sri Lanka) Prageeth Rambukwella
- (Sri Lanka) Ravindra Kottahachchi
- (Sri Lanka) Chamara de Soysa
- (Sri Lanka) Asanka Nanayakkara
- (Sri Lanka) Chandrika Amarasinghe
- (Sri Lanka) Hemantha Boteju
- (Sri Lanka) Shantha Fonseka
- (Sri Lanka) Rasanja Dulsiri

== League stage ==
The fixtures for the 2026 LPL were announced by the SLC on 18 May 2026. The tournament commenced on 17 July with an opening ceremony, followed by the opening match between Jaffna and Galle at the SSC Cricket Ground.

=== Points table ===
League stage standings
| Pos | Team | Pld | W | L | NR | Pts | NRR | Qualification |
|---|---|---|---|---|---|---|---|---|
| 1 | Jaffna Kings (R) | 8 | 5 | 2 | 1 | 11 | 0.385 | Advanced to Qualifier 1 |
| 2 | Galle Gallants (C) | 8 | 5 | 3 | 0 | 10 | 0.604 | Advanced to Qualifier 1 |
| 3 | Colombo Kaps | 8 | 4 | 4 | 0 | 8 | 0.108 | Advanced to Eliminator |
| 4 | Kandy Royals | 8 | 3 | 5 | 0 | 6 | −0.567 | Advanced to Eliminator |
| 5 | Dambulla Sixers | 8 | 2 | 5 | 1 | 5 | −0.565 | Eliminated |

Source: Cricinfo
(C) Champions; (R) Runners-up

=== Match summary ===
| Team | Group matches | | | | | | | | Playoffs | | |
| Team | 1 | 2 | 3 | 4 | 5 | 6 | 7 | 8 | Q1/E | Q2 | F |
|---|---|---|---|---|---|---|---|---|---|---|---|
| Colombo Kaps | 0 | 2 | 2 | 4 | 6 | 6 | 8 | 8 | W | L | |
| Dambulla Sixers | 2 | 2 | 2 | 4 | 4 | 4 | 4 | 5 | | | |
| Galle Gallants | 2 | 4 | 4 | 6 | 6 | 8 | 8 | 10 | L | W | W |
| Jaffna Kings | 0 | 2 | 4 | 4 | 6 | 8 | 10 | 11 | W | | L |
| Kandy Royals | 0 | 0 | 2 | 2 | 4 | 4 | 6 | 6 | L | | |

| Win | Loss | No result |

- Note: The total points at the end of each group match are listed.
- Note: Click on the points (group matches) or W/L (playoffs) to see the match summary.

| Visitor team → | CLK | DAS | GAG | JK | KAR |
| Home team ↓ | CLK | DAS | GAG | JK | KAR |
|---|---|---|---|---|---|
| Colombo Kaps | | Colombo; 4 wickets | Galle; 13 runs | Jaffna; 19 runs | Colombo; 6 wickets |
| Dambulla Sixers | Colombo; 21 runs | | Dambulla; 6 wickets | Jaffna; 5 wickets | Kandy; 43 runs |
| Galle Gallants | Galle; 5 wickets | Galle; 44 runs | | Galle; 60 runs | Kandy; 11 runs |
| Jaffna Kings | Jaffna; 5 runs | Match abandoned | Galle; 36 runs | | Jaffna; 21 runs |
| Kandy Royals | Colombo; 23 runs | Dambulla; 18 runs | Kandy; 6 wickets | Jaffna; 93 runs | |

| Home team won | Visitor team won |

- Note: Results listed are according to the home (horizontal) and visitor (vertical) teams.
- Note: Click on a result to see a summary of the match.

=== Fixtures ===
Match 1
17 July 2026
19:30 (N)
Scorecard

| Galle Gallants; 213/6 (20 overs) | v | Jaffna Kings; 177 (19.4 overs) |
| Charith Asalanka 65 (38); Lizaad Williams 2/28 (3 overs) | | Dunith Wellalage 40 (24); Eshan Malinga 4/26 (3.4 overs) |

Galle Gallants won by 36 runs
SSC Cricket Ground, Colombo
Umpires: Chamara de Soysa (SL) and Asif Yaqoob (Pak)
Player of the match: Charith Asalanka (Galle Gallants)

- Jaffna Kings won the toss and elected to field.
- This was the first LPL match played at this venue.

Match 2
18 July 2026
15:00 (D/N)
Scorecard

| Dambulla Sixers; 205/6 (20 overs) | v | Kandy Royals; 187/6 (20 overs) |
| Reeza Hendricks 87* (50); Dushan Hemantha 2/26 (4 overs) | | Dale Phillips 52 (39); Gulbadin Naib 2/19 (2 overs) |

Dambulla Sixers won by 18 runs
SSC Cricket Ground, Colombo
Umpires: Hemantha Boteju (SL) and Ravindra Kottahachchi (SL)
Player of the match: Reeza Hendricks (Dambulla Sixers)

- Dambulla Sixers won the toss and elected to bat.
- Reeza Hendricks and Gulbadin Naib (Dambulla Sixers) recorded the highest partnership for the 7th wicket (94* runs) in the LPL.

Match 3
18 July 2026
19:30 (N)
Scorecard

| Colombo Kaps; 189/8 (20 overs) | v | Galle Gallants; 191/5 (19.2 overs) |
| Kusal Mendis 79 (53); Akif Javed 4/40 (4 overs) | | Sam Harper 65 (45); Wanuja Sahan 3/19 (3 overs) |

Galle Gallants won by 5 wickets
SSC Cricket Ground, Colombo
Umpires: Chandrika Amarasinghe (SL) and Raveendra Wimalasiri (SL)
Player of the match: Sam Harper (Galle Gallants)

- Galle Gallants won the toss and elected to field.

Match 4
19 July 2026
15:00 (D/N)
Scorecard

| Dambulla Sixers; 130 (19.3 overs) | v | Jaffna Kings; 133/5 (19 overs) |
| Pavan Rathnayake 27 (16); Lizaad Williams 3/14 (2.3 overs) | | Bhanuka Rajapaksa 61* (37); Dushmantha Chameera 2/29 (4 overs) |

Jaffna Kings won by 5 wickets
SSC Cricket Ground, Colombo
Umpires: Asanka Nanayakkara (SL) and Prageeth Rambukwella (SL)
Player of the match: Bhanuka Rajapaksa (Jaffna Kings)

- Jaffna Kings won the toss and elected to field.

Match 5
19 July 2026
19:30 (N)
Scorecard

| Kandy Royals; 179 (20 overs) | v | Colombo Kaps; 182/4 (19.4 overs) |
| Lahiru Udara 53 (36); Binura Fernando 4/45 (4 overs) | | Janith Liyanage 53* (32); Wanindu Hasaranga 2/29 (4 overs) |

Colombo Kaps won by 6 wickets
SSC Cricket Ground, Colombo
Umpires: Shantha Fonseka (SL) and Asif Yaqoob (Pak)
Player of the match: Janith Liyanage (Colombo Kaps)

- Colombo Kaps won the toss and elected to field.

Match 6
21 July 2026
19:30 (N)
Scorecard

| Kandy Royals; 194/6 (20 overs) | v | Dambulla Sixers; 151/8 (20 overs) |
| Lahiru Udara 51 (34); Fazalhaq Farooqi 2/20 (4 overs) | | Sahibzada Farhan 74 (45); Nuwan Thushara 4/29 (4 overs) |

Kandy Royals won by 43 runs
Rangiri Dambulla Stadium, Dambulla
Umpires: Chamara de Soysa (SL) and Asif Yaqoob (Pak)
Player of the match: Wanindu Hasaranga (Kandy Royals)

- Dambulla Sixers won the toss and elected to field.

Match 7
22 July 2026
15:00 (D/N)
Scorecard

| Jaffna Kings; 179/6 (20 overs) | v | Colombo Kaps; 174/9 (20 overs) |
| Chamindu Wickramasinghe 43 (22); Shahnawaz Dahani 2/25 (4 overs) | | Kamindu Mendis 58 (42); Lizaad Williams 3/30 (4 overs) |

Jaffna Kings won by 5 runs
Rangiri Dambulla Stadium, Dambulla
Umpires: Chamara de Soysa (SL) and Rasanja Dulsiri (SL)
Player of the match: Chamindu Wickramasinghe (Jaffna Kings)

- Colombo Kaps won the toss and elected to field.

Match 8
22 July 2026
19:30 (N)
Scorecard

| Galle Gallants; 178/8 (20 overs) | v | Dambulla Sixers; 180/4 (16.1 overs) |
| Chamika Karunaratne 45 (30); Fazalhaq Farooqi 3/39 (4 overs) | | Reeza Hendricks 64* (37); Chamika Karunaratne 1/7 (1 over) |

Dambulla Sixers won by 6 wickets
Rangiri Dambulla Stadium, Dambulla
Umpires: Chandrika Amarasinghe (SL) and Asif Yaqoob (Pak)
Player of the match: Reeza Hendricks (Dambulla Sixers)

- Dambulla Sixers won the toss and elected to field.

Match 9
23 July 2026
15:00 (D/N)
Scorecard

| Colombo Kaps; 192/9 (20 overs) | v | Kandy Royals; 169/8 (20 overs) |
| Rubin Hermann 53 (36); Dushan Hemantha 2/20 (2 overs) | | Angelo Mathews 39* (24); Mujeeb Ur Rahman 3/34 (4 overs) |

Colombo Kaps won by 23 runs
Rangiri Dambulla Stadium, Dambulla
Umpires: Hemantha Boteju (SL) and Asif Yaqoob (Pak)
Player of the match: Janith Liyanage (Colombo Kaps)

- Kandy Royals won the toss and elected to field.

Match 10
23 July 2026
19:30 (N)
Scorecard

| Galle Gallants; 193/8 (20 overs) | v | Jaffna Kings; 133 (17.5 overs) |
| Sahan Arachchige 63 (36); Dilshan Madushanka 2/35 (4 overs) | | Dunith Wellalage 56 (39); Eshan Malinga 3/13 (4 overs) |

Galle Gallants won by 60 runs
Rangiri Dambulla Stadium, Dambulla
Umpires: Chamara de Soysa (SL) and Asif Yaqoob (Pak)
Player of the match: Sahan Arachchige (Galle Gallants)

- Jaffna Kings won the toss and elected to field.

Match 11
25 July 2026
15:00 (D/N)
Scorecard

| Kandy Royals; 165/6 (20 overs) | v | Galle Gallants; 154/8 (20 overs) |
| Moeen Ali 41 (29); Akif Javed 2/26 (4 overs) | | Dasun Shanaka 57* (38); Nuwan Thushara 3/33 (4 overs) |

Kandy Royals won by 11 runs
Rangiri Dambulla Stadium, Dambulla
Umpires: Ravindra Kottahachchi (SL) and Prageeth Rambukwella (SL)
Player of the match: Moeen Ali (Kandy Royals)

- Galle Gallants won the toss and elected to field.

Match 12
25 July 2026
19:30 (N)
Scorecard

| Colombo Kaps; 197/5 (20 overs) | v | Dambulla Sixers; 176/8 (20 overs) |
| Kamindu Mendis 88* (39); Ramesh Mendis 1/5 (1 over) | | Pavan Rathnayake 50 (30); Shahnawaz Dahani 2/20 (4 overs) |

Colombo Kaps won by 21 runs
Rangiri Dambulla Stadium, Dambulla
Umpires: Asanka Nanayakkara (SL) and Raveendra Wimalasiri (SL)
Player of the match: Kamindu Mendis (Colombo Kaps)

- Dambulla Sixers won the toss and elected to field.

Match 13
26 July 2026
15:00 (D/N)
Scorecard

| Jaffna Kings; 199/4 (20 overs) | v | Kandy Royals; 106 (18.2 overs) |
| Kamil Mishara 78 (53); Shaheen Shah Afridi 3/27 (4 overs) | | Lahiru Udara 54 (41); Mohamed Shiraz 3/18 (3.2 overs) |

Jaffna Kings won by 93 runs
Rangiri Dambulla Stadium, Dambulla
Umpires: Rasanja Dulsiri (SL) and Prageeth Rambukwella (SL)
Player of the match: Kamil Mishara (Jaffna Kings)

- Jaffna Kings won the toss and elected to bat.

Match 14
26 July 2026
19:30 (N)
Scorecard

| Galle Gallants; 220/6 (20 overs) | v | Dambulla Sixers; 176/7 (20 overs) |
| Chamika Karunaratne 72* (34); Dushmantha Chameera 5/55 (4 overs) | | Ramesh Mendis 39* (22); Sachindu Colombage 3/17 (4 overs) |

Galle Gallants won by 44 runs
Rangiri Dambulla Stadium, Dambulla
Umpires: Chamara de Soysa (SL) and Ravindra Kottahachchi (SL)
Player of the match: Chamika Karunaratne (Galle Gallants)

- Galle Gallants won the toss and elected to bat.

Match 15
28 July 2026
19:30 (N)
Scorecard

| Jaffna Kings; 202/5 (20 overs) | v | Colombo Kaps; 183/9 (20 overs) |
| Ibrahim Zadran 95 (65); James Neesham 2/30 (4 overs) | | Sadeera Samarawickrama 44 (36); Dilshan Madushanka 3/30 (4 overs) |

Jaffna Kings won by 19 runs
Pallekele Cricket Stadium, Kandy
Umpires: Ravindra Kottahachchi (SL) and Raveendra Wimalasiri (SL)
Player of the match: Ibrahim Zadran (Jaffna Kings)

- Colombo Kaps won the toss and elected to field.
- Shahnawaz Dahani (Colombo Kaps) recorded the most expensive bowling figures in the LPL (0/71).

Match 16
29 July 2026
15:00 (D/N)
Scorecard

| Galle Gallants; 208/3 (20 overs) | v | Kandy Royals; 214/4 (18.5 overs) |
| Sam Harper 72 (38); Zahir Khan 2/25 (4 overs) | | Lahiru Udara 132* (63); Sachindu Colombage 3/18 (4 overs) |

Kandy Royals won by 6 wickets
Pallekele Cricket Stadium, Kandy
Umpires: Prageeth Rambukwella (SL) and Raveendra Wimalasiri (SL)
Player of the match: Lahiru Udara (Kandy Royals)

- Galle Gallants won the toss and elected to bat.
- Lahiru Udara (Kandy Royals) scored his maiden T20 century and scored the highest individual score in the LPL.

Match 17
29 July 2026
19:30 (N)
Scorecard

| Dambulla Sixers; 174/5 (20 overs) | v | Colombo Kaps; 177/6 (19 overs) |
| Reeza Hendricks 80 (54); Shahnawaz Dahani 2/41 (4 overs) | | Rubin Hermann 48 (26); Akila Dananjaya 2/32 (4 overs); Dushmantha Chameera 2/32 (4 overs) |

Colombo Kaps won by 4 wickets
Pallekele Cricket Stadium, Kandy
Umpires: Kumar Dharmasena (SL) and Shantha Fonseka (SL)
Player of the match: Rubin Hermann (Colombo Kaps)

- Dambulla Sixers won the toss and elected to bat.

Match 18
30 July 2026
19:30 (N)
Scorecard

| Jaffna Kings; 221/6 (20 overs) | v | Kandy Royals; 200 (20 overs) |
| Kamil Mishara 49 (26); Wanindu Hasaranga 2/37 (4 overs) | | Pavan Sandesh 48 (21); Dunith Wellalage 3/11 (2 overs) |

Jaffna Kings won by 21 runs
Pallekele Cricket Stadium, Kandy
Umpires: Prageeth Rambukwella (SL) and Wayne Knights (NZ)
Player of the match: Chamindu Wickramasinghe (Jaffna Kings)

- Kandy Royals won the toss and elected to field.

Match 19
1 August 2026
19:30 (N)
Scorecard

| Galle Gallants; 201/6 (20 overs) | v | Colombo Kaps; 188 (19.4 overs) |
| Charith Asalanka 58 (37); Wanuja Sahan 2/28 (3 overs) | | Ben McDermott 38 (28); Mohammad Nawaz 3/24 (4 overs) |

Galle Gallants won by 13 runs
Pallekele Cricket Stadium, Kandy
Umpires: Wayne Knights (NZ) and Raveendra Wimalasiri (SL)
Player of the match: Charith Asalanka (Galle Gallants)

- Colombo Kaps won the toss and elected to field.

Match 20
2 August 2026
19:30 (N)
Scorecard

| Dambulla Sixers; 203/8 (20 overs) | v | Jaffna Kings |
| Pavan Rathnayake 47 (28); Dilshan Madushanka 3/32 (4 overs) |

No result
Pallekele Cricket Stadium, Kandy
Umpires: Kumar Dharmasena (SL) and Wayne Knights (NZ)

- Jaffna Kings won the toss and elected to field.
- No further play was possible due to rain.

== Playoffs ==
=== Bracket ===
Qualifier 1
5 August 2026 – Colombo (RPS)
1 | Jaffna Kings | 242/2 (20 overs)
2 | Galle Gallants | 228/8 (20 overs)
Eliminator
5 August 2026 – Colombo (RPS)
3 | Colombo Kaps | 203/7 (20 overs)
4 | Kandy Royals | 135 (18.4 overs)

Qualifier 2
7 August 2026 – Colombo (RPS)
Q1L | Galle Gallants | 177/4 (18.4 overs)
EW | Colombo Kaps | 176 (18.5 overs)

Final
8 August 2026 – Colombo (RPS)
Q1W | Jaffna Kings | 123 (19.3 overs)
Q2W | Galle Gallants | 126/5 (15.5 overs)

=== Qualifier 1 ===
Qualifier 1
5 August 2026
15:00 (D/N)
Scorecard

| Jaffna Kings; 242/2 (20 overs) | v | Galle Gallants; 228/8 (20 overs) |
| Kamil Mishara 108* (55); Akif Javed 1/46 (3 overs) | | Sam Harper 44 (21); Mohamed Shiraz 3/32 (4 overs) |

Jaffna Kings won by 14 runs
R. Premadasa Stadium, Colombo
Umpires: Kumar Dharmasena (SL) and Raveendra Wimalasiri (SL)
Player of the match: Kamil Mishara (Jaffna Kings)

- Galle Gallants won the toss and elected to field.
- Kamil Mishara (Jaffna Kings) scored his maiden T20 century.
- Jaffna Kings' 242 in this match was the highest innings total in the LPL, surpassing their own record of 240 in 2024.
- The 470 runs scored in this match was the highest match aggregate in the LPL, surpassing 454 runs between Kandy Falcons and Jaffna Kings in 2024.
- Jaffna Kings qualified for their second consecutive and fifth overall LPL final.

=== Eliminator ===
Eliminator
5 August 2026
19:30 (N)
Scorecard

| Colombo Kaps; 203/7 (20 overs) | v | Kandy Royals; 135 (18.4 overs) |
| Ben McDermott 71 (39); Nuwan Thushara 2/31 (4 overs) | | Lahiru Udara 50 (36); Wanuja Sahan 2/8 (4 overs) |

Colombo Kaps won by 68 runs
R. Premadasa Stadium, Colombo
Umpires: Ravindra Kottahachchi (SL) and Wayne Knights (NZ)
Player of the match: Wanuja Sahan (Colombo Kaps)

- Colombo Kaps won the toss and elected to bat.

=== Qualifier 2 ===
Qualifier 2
7 August 2026
19:30 (N)
Scorecard

| Colombo Kaps; 176 (18.5 overs) | v | Galle Gallants; 177/4 (18.4 overs) |
| Ravindu Fernando 48 (27); Charith Asalanka 2/34 (3 overs) | | Sam Harper 77 (51); Ravindu Fernando 2/44 (4 overs) |

Galle Gallants won by 6 wickets
R. Premadasa Stadium, Colombo
Umpires: Chamara de Soysa (SL) and Kumar Dharmasena (SL)
Player of the match: Sam Harper (Galle Gallants)

- Colombo Kaps won the toss and elected to bat.
- Galle Gallants qualified for their second consecutive and fourth overall LPL final.

=== Final ===
Final
8 August 2026
19:30 (N)
Scorecard

| Jaffna Kings; 123 (19.3 overs) | v | Galle Gallants; 126/5 (15.5 overs) |
| Kamil Mishara 41 (32); Charith Asalanka 3/20 (4 overs) | | Tom Rogers 34 (27); Traveen Mathew 2/15 (2 overs) |

Galle Gallants won by 5 wickets
R. Premadasa Stadium, Colombo
Attendance: 21,000
Umpires: Kumar Dharmasena (SL) and Wayne Knights (NZ)
Player of the match: Charith Asalanka (Galle Gallants)

- Jaffna Kings won the toss and elected to bat.
- This was the second consecutive and fourth overall LPL final between Galle Gallants and Jaffna Kings.
- Galle Gallants won their maiden LPL title.

== Statistics and awards ==
Most runs
| Runs | Player | Team |
|---|---|---|
| 434 | Lahiru Udara | Kandy Royals |
| 425 | Sam Harper | Galle Gallants |
| 411 | Kamil Mishara | Jaffna Kings |
| 385 | Charith Asalanka | Galle Gallants |
| 294 | Reeza Hendricks | Dambulla Sixers |

Most wickets
| Wickets | Player | Team |
|---|---|---|
| 17 | Eshan Malinga | Galle Gallants |
| 16 | Lizaad Williams | Jaffna Kings |
| 15 | Akif Javed | Galle Gallants |
| 14 | 3 players | |

=== End of season awards ===
End of season awards
| Award | Player | Team |
|---|---|---|
| Player of the tournament | Kamil Mishara | Jaffna Kings |
| Best sportsmanship | Sam Harper | Galle Gallants |
| Emerging player of the tournament | Traveen Mathew | Jaffna Kings |
