= 2026 Colombo Kaps season =

Lanka Premier League cricket team

Colombo Kaps
2026 season
- Coach: Chamara Kapugedera
- Captain: Kusal Mendis; Kamindu Mendis
- League stage: 3rd place
- Eliminator: Won against Kandy Royals
- Qualifier 2: Lost to Galle Gallants
- Most runs: Kamindu Mendis (280)
- Most wickets: Mujeeb Ur Rahman (13)
- Most catches: James Neesham (6)
- Most wicket-keeping dismissals: Sadeera Samarawickrama (5)

The 2026 season was Colombo Kaps' sixth appearance in the Lanka Premier League (LPL). They were one of the five cricket teams that competed in the 2026 LPL. Mid-season, Kamindu Mendis took over as the captain after Kusal Mendis withdrew due to injury. The team was coached by Chamara Kapugedera. The team signed four players before the draft and sixteen players during it.

Colombo Kaps finished in first place in the league stage and advanced to Eliminator in the playoffs. They won against Kandy Royals in Eliminator but lost Qualifier 1 to Galle Gallants. Captain Kamindu scored the most runs (280) while Mujeeb Ur Rahman took the most wickets (13) for Colombo in the 2026 season.

== Pre-season ==
The 2026 Lanka Premier League was the 6th edition of the Lanka Premier League (LPL), a professional Twenty20 (T20) cricket league, organised by the Sri Lanka Cricket (SLC). The tournament featured five teams competing in 24 matches from 17 July to 8 August 2026.

Colombo Kaps were previously runners-up in the 2022 season. The team finished in 4th place in the previous season. In October 2025, the SLC terminated SKKY Group's ownership of the franchise for failing to fulfill contractual obligations. The franchise was then purchased by Witness Sports Alliance LLC, led by Indian entrepreneurs Saranyan Palaniswamy and K.C. Shyam Kangayan, and was renamed to Colombo Kaps from Colombo Strikers.

=== Players' draft ===
In January 2026, the SLC announced that instead of an auction a players' draft would be held ahead of the 2026 season. The players' draft was originally scheduled for 22 March 2026 but was postponed to 1 June 2026. Each team was allowed to sign two overseas and two domestic players before the draft. In the draft, each team was required to sign at least 14 players, with a maximum of 16 players under 10 categories, including 5 overseas players in 4 categories. One overseas player had to be from an associate country while two domestic players had to be under the age of 23.

Pre-draft direct signings
Category	Domestic	Overseas
Icon	Kusal Mendis	James Neesham
Star	Kamindu Mendis	Ben McDermott

Players' draft signings
Category	Domestic	Overseas
Platinum	Binura Fernando	Mujeeb Ur Rahman
Gold	Sadeera Samarawickrama	Shahnawaz Dahani
Gold	Milan Rathnayake	—N/a
Gold	Janith Liyanage	—N/a
Classic	Jeffrey Vandersay	Mohammad Haris
Classic	Thanuka Dabare	Hasan Mahmud
Classic	Movin Subasingha	—N/a
Emerging U23	Malsha Tharupathi	—N/a
Emerging U23	Sharujan Shanmuganathan	—N/a
Associate Star	—N/a	Kushal Bhurtel
Optional Gold	Wanuja Sahan	—N/a
Optional Classic	Anthony Arul Pragasam	—N/a

== Squad ==
- Players with international caps as of the start of the 2026 LPL are listed in **bold**.
- Ages are as of 17 July 2026.
- Withdrawn players are indicated by a dagger symbol (†) and placed at the bottom of the table.

Colombo Kaps squad for the 2026 Lanka Premier League
S/N	Name	Nationality	Birth date	Batting style	Bowling style	Category	Notes
2	Thanuka Dabare	Sri Lanka	20 August 1998 (aged 27)	Left-handed	Right-arm off break	Domestic Classic	
5	Wanuja Sahan	Sri Lanka	17 June 2003 (aged 23)	Left-handed	Slow left-arm orthodox	Domestic Gold	
7	**Mujeeb Ur Rahman**	Afghanistan	28 March 2001 (aged 25)	Right-handed	Right-arm off break	Overseas Platinum	Overseas
10	Malsha Tharupathi	Sri Lanka	7 November 2004 (aged 21)	Right-handed	Right-arm leg break	Emerging U23	
14	**Kushal Bhurtel**	Nepal	22 January 1997 (aged 29)	Right-handed	Right-arm leg break	Associate Star	Overseas
19	**Ashen Bandara**	Sri Lanka	23 November 1998 (age 27)	Right-handed	Right-arm leg break	Domestic Icon	Replacement (Note: Ashen Bandara replaced Kusal Mendis, after the latter withdrew due to hamstring injury.)
21	**Kamindu Mendis**	Sri Lanka	30 September 1998 (aged 27)	Left-handed	Ambidextrous spin	Domestic Star	Captain (Note: Kamindu Mendis took over as the captain after Kusal Mendis withdrew due to hamstring injury.)
23	**Sadeera Samarawickrama**	Sri Lanka	30 August 1995 (aged 30)	Right-handed	—N/a	Domestic Gold	
24	**Ripon Mondol**	Bangladesh	21 March 2003 (age 23)	Right-handed	Right-arm medium-fast	Overseas Classic	Overseas; replacement (Note: Ripon Mondol replaced Hasan Mahmud, after the latter withdrew due to national duty.)
25	Sharujan Shanmuganathan	Sri Lanka	25 April 2006 (aged 20)	Right-handed	Right-arm leg break	Emerging U23	
37	**Milan Rathnayake**	Sri Lanka	1 August 1996 (aged 29)	Left-handed	Right-arm medium-fast	Domestic Gold	
45	**Shahnawaz Dahani**	Pakistan	5 August 1998 (aged 27)	Right-handed	Right-arm medium-fast	Overseas Gold	Overseas
46	**Jeffrey Vandersay**	Sri Lanka	5 February 1990 (aged 36)	Right-handed	Right-arm leg break	Domestic Classic	
47	**Ben McDermott**	Australia	12 December 1994 (aged 31)	Right-handed	Right-arm medium-fast	Overseas Star	Overseas
50	**James Neesham**	New Zealand	17 September 1990 (aged 35)	Left-handed	Right-arm medium-fast	Overseas Icon	Overseas
51	Movin Subasingha	Sri Lanka	6 July 2000 (aged 26)	Right-handed	Right-arm off break	Domestic Classic	
69	Anthony Arul Pragasam	Sri Lanka	6 November 1993 (aged 32)	Right-handed	Right-arm medium-fast	Domestic Classic	
71	**Binura Fernando**	Sri Lanka	12 July 1995 (aged 31)	Right-handed	Left-arm medium-fast	Domestic Platinum	
83	**Rubin Hermann**	South Africa	26 January 1997 (aged 29)	Left-handed	—N/a	Overseas Classic	Overseas; replacement (Note: Rubin Hermann replaced Mohammad Haris, after the latter withdrew due to participating in GSL.)
95	**Janith Liyanage**	Sri Lanka	12 July 1995 (aged 31)	Right-handed	Right-arm medium-fast	Domestic Gold	
13	**Kusal Mendis** †	Sri Lanka	2 February 1995 (aged 31)	Right-handed	Right-arm leg break	Domestic Icon	Captain; withdrawn
29	**Mohammad Haris** †	Pakistan	30 March 2001 (aged 25)	Right-handed	Right-arm off break	Overseas Classic	Overseas; withdrawn
91	**Hasan Mahmud** †	Bangladesh	12 October 1999 (aged 26)	Right-handed	Right-arm medium-fast	Overseas Classic	Overseas; withdrawn

== Support staff ==
Position	Name
Head coach	Chamara Kapugedera
Bowling coach	Nuwan Kulasekara
Fielding coach	Vimukthi Deshapriya

== League stage ==
Colombo Kaps began their season with a loss to Galle Gallants. They won their next match against Kandy Royals but lost to Jaffna Kings. They won their next two matches against Kandy and Dambulla Sixers but lost to Jaffna again. They won their next match against Dambulla but lost to Galle again and finished the league stage at third place with eight points and advanced to Eliminator in the playoffs.

=== Points table ===
League stage standings
Pos	Team	Pld	W	L	NR	Pts	NRR	Qualification
1	Jaffna Kings (R)	8	5	2	1	11	0.385	Advanced to Qualifier 1
2	Galle Gallants (C)	8	5	3	0	10	0.604	Advanced to Qualifier 1
3	Colombo Kaps	8	4	4	0	8	0.108	Advanced to Eliminator
4	Kandy Royals	8	3	5	0	6	−0.567	Advanced to Eliminator
5	Dambulla Sixers	8	2	5	1	5	−0.565	Eliminated

Source: Cricinfo
(C) Champions; (R) Runners-up

=== League progression ===
League progression
Team	Group matches								Playoffs		
Team	1	2	3	4	5	6	7	8	Q1/E	Q2	F
Colombo Kaps	0	2	2	4	6	6	8	8	W	L	

Win	Loss	No result

- Note: The total points at the end of each group match are listed.
- Note: Click on the points (group matches) or W/L (playoffs) to see the match summary.

=== Fixtures ===
Match 3
18 July 2026
19:30 (N)
Scorecard

Colombo Kaps; 189/8 (20 overs)	v	Galle Gallants; 191/5 (19.2 overs)
Kusal Mendis 79 (53); Akif Javed 4/40 (4 overs)		Sam Harper 65 (45); Wanuja Sahan 3/19 (3 overs)

Galle Gallants won by 5 wickets
SSC Cricket Ground, Colombo
Umpires: Chandrika Amarasinghe (SL) and Raveendra Wimalasiri (SL)
Player of the match: Sam Harper (Galle Gallants)

- Galle Gallants won the toss and elected to field.

Match 5
19 July 2026
19:30 (N)
Scorecard

Kandy Royals; 179 (20 overs)	v	Colombo Kaps; 182/4 (19.4 overs)
Lahiru Udara 53 (36); Binura Fernando 4/45 (4 overs)		Janith Liyanage 53* (32); Wanindu Hasaranga 2/29 (4 overs)

Colombo Kaps won by 6 wickets
SSC Cricket Ground, Colombo
Umpires: Shantha Fonseka (SL) and Asif Yaqoob (Pak)
Player of the match: Janith Liyanage (Colombo Kaps)

- Colombo Kaps won the toss and elected to field.

Match 7
22 July 2026
15:00 (D/N)
Scorecard

Jaffna Kings; 179/6 (20 overs)	v	Colombo Kaps; 174/9 (20 overs)
Chamindu Wickramasinghe 43 (22); Shahnawaz Dahani 2/25 (4 overs)		Kamindu Mendis 58 (42); Lizaad Williams 3/30 (4 overs)

Jaffna Kings won by 5 runs
Rangiri Dambulla Stadium, Dambulla
Umpires: Chamara de Soysa (SL) and Rasanja Dulsiri (SL)
Player of the match: Chamindu Wickramasinghe (Jaffna Kings)

- Colombo Kaps won the toss and elected to field.

Match 9
23 July 2026
15:00 (D/N)
Scorecard

Colombo Kaps; 192/9 (20 overs)	v	Kandy Royals; 169/8 (20 overs)
Rubin Hermann 53 (36); Dushan Hemantha 2/20 (2 overs)		Angelo Mathews 39* (24); Mujeeb Ur Rahman 3/34 (4 overs)

Colombo Kaps won by 23 runs
Rangiri Dambulla Stadium, Dambulla
Umpires: Hemantha Boteju (SL) and Asif Yaqoob (Pak)
Player of the match: Janith Liyanage (Colombo Kaps)

- Kandy Royals won the toss and elected to field.

Match 12
25 July 2026
19:30 (N)
Scorecard

Colombo Kaps; 197/5 (20 overs)	v	Dambulla Sixers; 176/8 (20 overs)
Kamindu Mendis 88* (39); Ramesh Mendis 1/5 (1 over)		Pavan Rathnayake 50 (30); Shahnawaz Dahani 2/20 (4 overs)

Colombo Kaps won by 21 runs
Rangiri Dambulla Stadium, Dambulla
Umpires: Asanka Nanayakkara (SL) and Raveendra Wimalasiri (SL)
Player of the match: Kamindu Mendis (Colombo Kaps)

- Dambulla Sixers won the toss and elected to field.

Match 15
28 July 2026
19:30 (N)
Scorecard

Jaffna Kings; 202/5 (20 overs)	v	Colombo Kaps; 183/9 (20 overs)
Ibrahim Zadran 95 (65); James Neesham 2/30 (4 overs)		Sadeera Samarawickrama 44 (36); Dilshan Madushanka 3/30 (4 overs)

Jaffna Kings won by 19 runs
Pallekele Cricket Stadium, Kandy
Umpires: Ravindra Kottahachchi (SL) and Raveendra Wimalasiri (SL)
Player of the match: Ibrahim Zadran (Jaffna Kings)

- Colombo Kaps won the toss and elected to field.
- Shahnawaz Dahani (Colombo Kaps) recorded the most expensive bowling figures in the LPL (0/71).

Match 17
29 July 2026
19:30 (N)
Scorecard

Dambulla Sixers; 174/5 (20 overs)	v	Colombo Kaps; 177/6 (19 overs)
Reeza Hendricks 80 (54); Shahnawaz Dahani 2/41 (4 overs)		Rubin Hermann 48 (26); Akila Dananjaya 2/32 (4 overs); Dushmantha Chameera 2/32 (4 overs)

Colombo Kaps won by 4 wickets
Pallekele Cricket Stadium, Kandy
Umpires: Kumar Dharmasena (SL) and Shantha Fonseka (SL)
Player of the match: Rubin Hermann (Colombo Kaps)

- Dambulla Sixers won the toss and elected to bat.

Match 19
1 August 2026
19:30 (N)
Scorecard

Galle Gallants; 201/6 (20 overs)	v	Colombo Kaps; 188 (19.4 overs)
Charith Asalanka 58 (37); Wanuja Sahan 2/28 (3 overs)		Ben McDermott 38 (28); Mohammad Nawaz 3/24 (4 overs)

Galle Gallants won by 13 runs
Pallekele Cricket Stadium, Kandy
Umpires: Wayne Knights (NZ) and Raveendra Wimalasiri (SL)
Player of the match: Charith Asalanka (Galle Gallants)

- Colombo Kaps won the toss and elected to field.

== Playoffs ==
=== Bracket ===
Qualifier 1
5 August 2026 – Colombo (RPS)
1	Jaffna Kings	242/2 (20 overs)
2	Galle Gallants	228/8 (20 overs)
Eliminator
5 August 2026 – Colombo (RPS)
3	Colombo Kaps	203/7 (20 overs)
4	Kandy Royals	135 (18.4 overs)

Qualifier 2
7 August 2026 – Colombo (RPS)
Q1L	Galle Gallants	177/4 (18.4 overs)
EW	Colombo Kaps	176 (18.5 overs)

Final
8 August 2026 – Colombo (RPS)
Q1W	Jaffna Kings	123 (19.3 overs)
Q2W	Galle Gallants	126/5 (15.5 overs)

=== Eliminator ===
Eliminator
5 August 2026
19:30 (N)
Scorecard

Colombo Kaps; 203/7 (20 overs)	v	Kandy Royals; 135 (18.4 overs)
Ben McDermott 71 (39); Nuwan Thushara 2/31 (4 overs)		Lahiru Udara 50 (36); Wanuja Sahan 2/8 (4 overs)

Colombo Kaps won by 68 runs
R. Premadasa Stadium, Colombo
Umpires: Ravindra Kottahachchi (SL) and Wayne Knights (NZ)
Player of the match: Wanuja Sahan (Colombo Kaps)

- Colombo Kaps won the toss and elected to bat.

=== Qualifier 2 ===
Qualifier 2
7 August 2026
19:30 (N)
Scorecard

Colombo Kaps; 176 (18.5 overs)	v	Galle Gallants; 177/4 (18.4 overs)
Ravindu Fernando 48 (27); Charith Asalanka 2/34 (3 overs)		Sam Harper 77 (51); Ravindu Fernando 2/44 (4 overs)

Galle Gallants won by 6 wickets
R. Premadasa Stadium, Colombo
Umpires: Chamara de Soysa (SL) and Kumar Dharmasena (SL)
Player of the match: Sam Harper (Galle Gallants)

- Colombo Kaps won the toss and elected to bat.
- Galle Gallants qualified for their second consecutive and fourth overall LPL final.

== Statistics ==
Most runs
Runs	Player
280	Kamindu Mendis
253	Ben McDermott
207	Janith Liyanage
196	Rubin Hermann
173	James Neesham

Most wickets
Wickets	Player
13	Mujeeb Ur Rahman
9	Wanuja Sahan
9	Shahnawaz Dahani
7	James Neesham
7	Malsha Tharupathi
