= 2026 Dambulla Sixers season =

Lanka Premier League cricket team

Dambulla Sixers
2026 season
- Coach: Rangana Herath
- Captain: Dinesh Chandimal
- League stage: 5th place
- Most runs: Reeza Hendricks (294)
- Most wickets: Dushmantha Chameera (12)
- Most catches: 5 players (3 each)
- Most wicket-keeping dismissals: Niroshan Dickwella (6)

The 2026 season was Dambulla Sixers' sixth appearance in the Lanka Premier League (LPL). They were one of the five cricket teams that competed in the 2026 LPL. The team was captained by Dinesh Chandimal and coached by Rangana Herath. The team signed four players before the draft and fourteen players in the draft.

Dambulla Sixers were the only team to be eliminated in the league stage and finished in last (fifth) place with only two wins. Reeza Hendricks scored the most runs (294) while Dushmantha Chameera took the most wickets (12) for Dambulla in the 2026 season.

== Pre-season ==
The 2026 Lanka Premier League was the 6th edition of the Lanka Premier League (LPL), a professional Twenty20 (T20) cricket league, organised by the Sri Lanka Cricket (SLC). The tournament featured five teams competing in 24 matches from 17 July to 8 August 2026. Dambulla Sixers were previously runners-up in the 2023 season. The team finished in last (5th) place in the previous season.

=== Players' draft ===
In January 2026, the SLC announced that instead of an auction a players' draft would be held ahead of the 2026 season. The players' draft was originally scheduled for 22 March 2026 but was postponed to 1 June 2026. Each team was allowed to sign two overseas and two domestic players before the draft. The SLC initially required players in the Icon and Star categories to have more than 250,000 social media followers, in addition to meeting cricketing criteria such as international appearances and franchise experience. The rule drew criticism from fans and commentators, who argued that selection should be based on cricketing merit rather than online popularity. SLC subsequently removed all references to minimum social media follower counts in the updated Version 1.5 of the Player Registration and Draft Guide issued on 9 May 2026, while retaining the cricket-based eligibility criteria. In the draft, each team was required to sign at least 14 players, with a maximum of 16 players under 10 categories, including 5 overseas players in 4 categories. One overseas player had to be from an associate country while two domestic players had to be under the age of 23.

Pre-draft direct signings
| Category | Domestic | Overseas |
|---|---|---|
| Icon | Dushmantha Chameera | Sahibzada Farhan |
| Star | Dinesh Chandimal | Reeza Hendricks |

Players' draft signings
| Category | Domestic | Overseas |
|---|---|---|
| Platinum | Maheesh Theekshana | Fazalhaq Farooqi |
| Gold | Niroshan Dickwella | Mohammad Wasim Jr. |
| Gold | Pavan Rathnayake | —N/a |
| Gold | Akila Dananjaya | —N/a |
| Classic | Dhananjaya Lakshan | Gulbadin Naib |
| Classic | Ramesh Mendis | Dian Forrester |
| Classic | Sachitha Jayathilake | —N/a |
| Emerging U23 | Vishwa Lahiru Kumara | —N/a |
| Emerging U23 | Gayana Weerasinghe | —N/a |
| Associate Star | —N/a | Shadley van Schalkwyk |
| Optional Gold | —N/a | —N/a |
| Optional Classic | —N/a | —N/a |

== Squad ==
- Players with international caps as of the start of the 2026 LPL are listed in **bold**.
- Ages are as of 17 July 2026.
- Withdrawn players are indicated by a dagger symbol (†) and placed at the bottom of the table.

Dambulla Sixers squad for the 2026 Lanka Premier League
| S/N | Name | Nationality | Birth date | Batting style | Bowling style | Category | Notes |
|---|---|---|---|---|---|---|---|
| 4 | **Akila Dananjaya** | Sri Lanka | 4 October 1993 (aged 32) | Left-handed | Right-arm leg break, off break | Domestic Gold | |
| 5 | **Dushmantha Chameera** | Sri Lanka | 11 January 1992 (aged 34) | Right-handed | Right-arm fast | Domestic Icon | |
| 6 | **Pavan Rathnayake** | Sri Lanka | 24 August 2002 (aged 23) | Right-handed | Right-arm off break, leg break | Domestic Gold | |
| 14 | **Gulbadin Naib** | Afghanistan | 4 June 1991 (aged 35) | Right-handed | Right-arm medium-fast | Overseas Classic | Overseas |
| 15 | Vishwa Lahiru Kumara | Sri Lanka | 15 November 2004 (aged 21) | Right-handed | Slow left-arm orthodox | Emerging U23 | |
| 16 | **Shadley van Schalkwyk** | United States | 5 August 1988 (aged 37) | Left-handed | Right-arm medium | Associate Star | Overseas |
| 17 | **Reeza Hendricks** | South Africa | 14 August 1989 (aged 36) | Right-handed | Right-arm off break | Overseas Star | Overseas |
| 24 | **Sikandar Raza** | Zimbabwe | 24 April 1986 (aged 40) | Right-handed | Right-arm off break, leg break | Overseas Platinum | Overseas; replacement (Note: Sikandar Raza replaced Fazalhaq Farooqi, after the latter withdrew due to national duty.) |
| 25 | **Ramesh Mendis** | Sri Lanka | 7 July 1995 (aged 31) | Right-handed | Right-arm off break | Domestic Classic | |
| 33 | Gayana Weerasinghe | Sri Lanka | 16 December 2004 (aged 21) | Right-handed | Right-arm medium-fast | Emerging U23 | |
| 48 | **Niroshan Dickwella** | Sri Lanka | 23 June 1993 (aged 33) | Left-handed | —N/a | Domestic Gold | |
| 51 | **Sahibzada Farhan** | Pakistan | 6 March 1996 (aged 30) | Right-handed | —N/a | Overseas Icon | Overseas |
| 56 | **Dinesh Chandimal** | Sri Lanka | 18 November 1989 (aged 36) | Right-handed | Right-arm off break | Domestic Star | Captain |
| 61 | **Maheesh Theekshana** | Sri Lanka | 1 August 2000 (aged 25) | Right-handed | Right-arm off break | Domestic Platinum | |
| 65 | Marques Ackerman | South Africa | 1 March 1996 (aged 30) | Left-handed | Right-arm off break | Overseas Classic | Overseas; replacement (Note: Marques Ackerman replaced Dian Forrester, after the latter withdrew due to participating in GSL.) |
| 68 | Sachitha Jayathilake | Sri Lanka | 24 February 1997 (aged 29) | Right-handed | Right-arm leg break | Domestic Classic | |
| 69 | **Dhananjaya Lakshan** | Sri Lanka | 5 October 1998 (aged 27) | Left-handed | Right-arm medium-fast | Domestic Classic | |
| 74 | **Mohammad Wasim Jr.** | Pakistan | 25 August 2001 (aged 24) | Right-handed | Right-arm fast-medium | Overseas Gold | Overseas |
| 83 | **Fazalhaq Farooqi** † | Afghanistan | 22 September 2000 (aged 25) | Right-handed | Left-arm fast-medium | Overseas Platinum | Overseas; withdrawn |
| —N/a | **Dian Forrester** † | South Africa | 7 June 2000 (aged 26) | Left-handed | Right-arm fast | Overseas Classic | Overseas; withdrawn |

== Support staff ==
| Position | Name |
|---|---|
| Head coach | Rangana Herath |
| Bowling coach | Ajith Ekanayake |
| Fielding coach | Ruvin Peiris |

== League stage ==
Dambulla Sixers began their season with a win against Kandy Royals. They lost their next two matches to Jaffna Kings in their special "Pink Match" and Kandy but won against Galle Gallants. They lost their next three matches to Colombo Kaps, Galle and Colombo again and their last match of the season against Jaffna was cancelled midway due to rain, and both teams were awarded a point each. They finished the league stage at last place with five points and were eliminated.

=== Points table ===
League stage standings
| Pos | Team | Pld | W | L | NR | Pts | NRR | Qualification |
|---|---|---|---|---|---|---|---|---|
| 1 | Jaffna Kings (R) | 8 | 5 | 2 | 1 | 11 | 0.385 | Advanced to Qualifier 1 |
| 2 | Galle Gallants (C) | 8 | 5 | 3 | 0 | 10 | 0.604 | Advanced to Qualifier 1 |
| 3 | Colombo Kaps | 8 | 4 | 4 | 0 | 8 | 0.108 | Advanced to Eliminator |
| 4 | Kandy Royals | 8 | 3 | 5 | 0 | 6 | −0.567 | Advanced to Eliminator |
| 5 | Dambulla Sixers | 8 | 2 | 5 | 1 | 5 | −0.565 | Eliminated |

Source: Cricinfo
(C) Champions; (R) Runners-up

=== League progression ===
League progression
| Team | Group matches | | | | | | | | Playoffs | | |
| Team | 1 | 2 | 3 | 4 | 5 | 6 | 7 | 8 | Q1/E | Q2 | F |
|---|---|---|---|---|---|---|---|---|---|---|---|
| Dambulla Sixers | 2 | 2 | 2 | 4 | 4 | 4 | 4 | 5 | | | |

| Win | Loss | No result |

- Note: The total points at the end of each group match are listed.
- Note: Click on the points (group matches) or W/L (playoffs) to see the match summary.

=== Fixtures ===
Match 2
18 July 2026
15:00 (D/N)
Scorecard

| Dambulla Sixers; 205/6 (20 overs) | v | Kandy Royals; 187/6 (20 overs) |
| Reeza Hendricks 87* (50); Dushan Hemantha 2/26 (4 overs) | | Dale Phillips 52 (39); Gulbadin Naib 2/19 (2 overs) |

Dambulla Sixers won by 18 runs
SSC Cricket Ground, Colombo
Umpires: Hemantha Boteju (SL) and Ravindra Kottahachchi (SL)
Player of the match: Reeza Hendricks (Dambulla Sixers)

- Dambulla Sixers won the toss and elected to bat.
- Reeza Hendricks and Gulbadin Naib (Dambulla Sixers) recorded the highest partnership for the 7th wicket (94* runs) in the LPL.

Match 4
19 July 2026
15:00 (D/N)
Scorecard

| Dambulla Sixers; 130 (19.3 overs) | v | Jaffna Kings; 133/5 (19 overs) |
| Pavan Rathnayake 27 (16); Lizaad Williams 3/14 (2.3 overs) | | Bhanuka Rajapaksa 61* (37); Dushmantha Chameera 2/29 (4 overs) |

Jaffna Kings won by 5 wickets
SSC Cricket Ground, Colombo
Umpires: Asanka Nanayakkara (SL) and Prageeth Rambukwella (SL)
Player of the match: Bhanuka Rajapaksa (Jaffna Kings)

- Jaffna Kings won the toss and elected to field.

Match 6
21 July 2026
19:30 (N)
Scorecard

| Kandy Royals; 194/6 (20 overs) | v | Dambulla Sixers; 151/8 (20 overs) |
| Lahiru Udara 51 (34); Fazalhaq Farooqi 2/20 (4 overs) | | Sahibzada Farhan 74 (45); Nuwan Thushara 4/29 (4 overs) |

Kandy Royals won by 43 runs
Rangiri Dambulla Stadium, Dambulla
Umpires: Chamara de Soysa (SL) and Asif Yaqoob (Pak)
Player of the match: Wanindu Hasaranga (Kandy Royals)

- Dambulla Sixers won the toss and elected to field.

Match 8
22 July 2026
19:30 (N)
Scorecard

| Galle Gallants; 178/8 (20 overs) | v | Dambulla Sixers; 180/4 (16.1 overs) |
| Chamika Karunaratne 45 (30); Fazalhaq Farooqi 3/39 (4 overs) | | Reeza Hendricks 64* (37); Chamika Karunaratne 1/7 (1 over) |

Dambulla Sixers won by 6 wickets
Rangiri Dambulla Stadium, Dambulla
Umpires: Chandrika Amarasinghe (SL) and Asif Yaqoob (Pak)
Player of the match: Reeza Hendricks (Dambulla Sixers)

- Dambulla Sixers won the toss and elected to field.

Match 12
25 July 2026
19:30 (N)
Scorecard

| Colombo Kaps; 197/5 (20 overs) | v | Dambulla Sixers; 176/8 (20 overs) |
| Kamindu Mendis 88* (39); Ramesh Mendis 1/5 (1 over) | | Pavan Rathnayake 50 (30); Shahnawaz Dahani 2/20 (4 overs) |

Colombo Kaps won by 21 runs
Rangiri Dambulla Stadium, Dambulla
Umpires: Asanka Nanayakkara (SL) and Raveendra Wimalasiri (SL)
Player of the match: Kamindu Mendis (Colombo Kaps)

- Dambulla Sixers won the toss and elected to field.

Match 14
26 July 2026
19:30 (N)
Scorecard

| Galle Gallants; 220/6 (20 overs) | v | Dambulla Sixers; 176/7 (20 overs) |
| Chamika Karunaratne 72* (34); Dushmantha Chameera 5/55 (4 overs) | | Ramesh Mendis 39* (22); Sachindu Colombage 3/17 (4 overs) |

Galle Gallants won by 44 runs
Rangiri Dambulla Stadium, Dambulla
Umpires: Chamara de Soysa (SL) and Ravindra Kottahachchi (SL)
Player of the match: Chamika Karunaratne (Galle Gallants)

- Galle Gallants won the toss and elected to bat.

Match 17
29 July 2026
19:30 (N)
Scorecard

| Dambulla Sixers; 174/5 (20 overs) | v | Colombo Kaps; 177/6 (19 overs) |
| Reeza Hendricks 80 (54); Shahnawaz Dahani 2/41 (4 overs) | | Rubin Hermann 48 (26); Akila Dananjaya 2/32 (4 overs); Dushmantha Chameera 2/32 (4 overs) |

Colombo Kaps won by 4 wickets
Pallekele Cricket Stadium, Kandy
Umpires: Kumar Dharmasena (SL) and Shantha Fonseka (SL)
Player of the match: Rubin Hermann (Colombo Kaps)

- Dambulla Sixers won the toss and elected to bat.

Match 20
2 August 2026
19:30 (N)
Scorecard

| Dambulla Sixers; 203/8 (20 overs) | v | Jaffna Kings |
| Pavan Rathnayake 47 (28); Dilshan Madushanka 3/32 (4 overs) |

No result
Pallekele Cricket Stadium, Kandy
Umpires: Kumar Dharmasena (SL) and Wayne Knights (NZ)

- Jaffna Kings won the toss and elected to field.
- No further play was possible due to rain.

== Statistics ==
Most runs
| Runs | Player |
|---|---|
| 294 | Reeza Hendricks |
| 172 | Pavan Rathnayake |
| 163 | Gulbadin Naib |
| 158 | Sahibzada Farhan |
| 115 | Marques Ackerman |

Most wickets
| Wickets | Player |
|---|---|
| 12 | Dushmantha Chameera |
| 6 | Fazalhaq Farooqi |
| 4 | Maheesh Theekshana |
| 4 | Gulbadin Naib |
| 4 | Mohammad Wasim Jr. |
