= Arachchige =

Arachchige is a surname. Notable people with the surname include:

- Sahan Arachchige (born 1996), Sri Lankan cricketer
- Shameera Arachchige (born 1992), Italian cricketer
