= List of Lanka Premier League centuries =

Overview of centuries scored in the Lanka Premier League (LPL)

The Lanka Premier League (LPL) is a professional Twenty20 cricket league, which is operated by Sri Lanka Cricket (SLC). It is contested between five franchises comprising cricketers from Sri Lanka and around the world.

A century is regarded as a landmark score for a batsman, achieved when he scores 100 or more runs in a single innings. His number of centuries is generally recorded in his career statistics.

The first century in the history of the Lanka Premier League was scored by Laurie Evans for Colombo Kings in the inaugural edition of the LPL on 10 December 2020. The highest scorer in the tournament was Lahiru Udara, who scored 132 (not out) runs for Kandy Royals against Galle Gallants. The fastest century in terms of balls (44 balls) was scored by Rilee Rossouw, who scored an unbeaten 108 off 50 balls for Jaffna Kings against Colombo Strikers. The slowest century was scored by Andre Fletcher, for Kandy Falcons, reaching this milestone in 66 deliveries while his final score was 102 runs not out in 67 deliveries.

The highest number of centuries have been scored by Rilee Rossouw with two centuries. Till date, 12 centuries have been scored by 11 different batsmen, out of which 6 are Sri Lankan players and 5 are overseas players. Players from all the 5 franchises have scored centuries. 6 centuries have been made by the players of Jaffna franchise, which is more than any other team.

== Centuries ==
Key
Symbol	Meaning
*	Remained not out
Balls	Balls faced during the innings
S/R	Strike rate during the innings
Inn.	The innings of the match
Result	Result for the batter's team

Lanka Premier League centuries
No.	Score	Balls	S/R	Player	Team	Opposition	Inn.	Venue	Date	Result
1	108*	65	166.15	(England) Laurie Evans	Colombo Kings	Jaffna Stallions	1	Hambantota	10 December 2020	Won
2	100	64	156.25	(Sri Lanka) Avishka Fernando	Jaffna Kings	Dambulla Giants	1	Hambantota	21 December 2021	Won
3	102*	67	152.23	(Grenada) Andre Fletcher	Kandy Falcons	Colombo Stars	1	Hambantota	6 December 2022	Won
4	104	59	176.27	(Pakistan) Babar Azam	Colombo Strikers	Galle Titans	2	Pallekele	7 August 2023	Won
5	102*	52	196.15	(Sri Lanka) Kusal Perera	Dambulla Sixers	Jaffna Kings	1	Pallekele	3 July 2024	Lost
6	104*	63	165.07	(New Zealand) Tim Seifert	Galle Marvels	Jaffna Kings	1	Dambulla	5 July 2024	Lost
7	119	59	201.69	(Sri Lanka) Pathum Nissanka	Jaffna Kings	Kandy Falcons	1	Dambulla	9 July 2024	Lost
8	108*	50	216.00	(South Africa) Rilee Rossouw (1/2)	Jaffna Kings	Colombo Strikers	2	Dambulla	10 July 2024	Won
9	105*	54	194.44	(Sri Lanka) Kusal Mendis	Jaffna Kings	Kandy Falcons	1	Colombo (RPS)	20 July 2024	Won
10	106*	53	200.00	(South Africa) Rilee Rossouw (2/2)	Jaffna Kings	Galle Marvels	2	Colombo (RPS)	21 July 2024	Won
11	132*	63	209.52	(Sri Lanka) Lahiru Udara	Kandy Royals	Galle Gallants	2	Pallekele	29 July 2026	Won
12	108*	55	196.36	(Sri Lanka) Kamil Mishara	Jaffna Kings	Galle Gallants	1	Colombo (RPS)	5 August 2026	Won

== Season overview ==
2024 season holds the record for the most centuries in a year with 6.

Season wise statistics for century scores
Season	No. of centuries	Highest score	Highest scorer
2020	1	108*	(England) Laurie Evans
2021	1	100	(Sri Lanka) Avishka Fernando
2022	1	102*	(Grenada) Andre Fletcher
2023	1	104	(Pakistan) Babar Azam
2024	6	119	(Sri Lanka) Pathum Nissanka
2026	2	132*	(Sri Lanka) Lahiru Udara

== Team overview ==
Team statistics for century scores
Team (Franchise)	No. of matches	No. of centurions	No. of centuries	Highest score	Highest scorer
Colombo	56	2	2	108*	(England) Laurie Evans
Dambulla	53	1	1	102*	(Sri Lanka) Kusal Perera
Galle	60	1	1	104*	(New Zealand) Tim Seifert
Jaffna	61	5	6	119	(Sri Lanka) Pathum Nissanka
Kandy	56	2	2	132*	(Sri Lanka) Lahiru Udara
