= 2026 Lanka Premier League final =

Twenty20 cricket match

- Match programme cover
- Event: 2026 Lanka Premier League
Jaffna Kings	Galle Gallants
123	126/5
19.3 overs	15.5 overs
- Galle Gallants won by 5 wickets
- Date: 8 August 2026 19:30 UTC+5:30
- Venue: R. Premadasa Stadium, Colombo
- Player of the match: Charith Asalanka (Galle Gallants)
- Umpires: Kumar Dharmasena (SL); Wayne Knights (NZ)
- Attendance: 21,000

The 2026 Lanka Premier League final was a Twenty20 (T20) cricket match played at the R. Premadasa Stadium in Colombo, Sri Lanka, on 8 August 2026 to determine the winner of the 2026 Lanka Premier League (LPL). The defending champions, Jaffna Kings, qualified for the final after winning Qualifier 1 against Galle Gallants, who went on to defeat Colombo Kaps in Qualifier 2 to secure their place in the final. Jaffna won the toss and elected to bat first; Jaffna were all out for 123 runs in their innings, which Galle chased down in 16 overs scoring 126/5 to win their maiden LPL title. This was the first time that Jaffna lost in the LPL finals.

== Background ==
The 2026 Lanka Premier League was the sixth edition of the Lanka Premier League (LPL), a professional Twenty20 (T20) cricket league, organised by Sri Lanka Cricket (SLC). The season commenced on 17 July and consisted of 5 teams competing in 24 matches. After the conclusion of the group stage, four teams advanced to the playoffs, which began on 5 August and concluded with the final played on 8 August at R. Premadasa Stadium in Colombo. This was the fourth consecutive LPL final held at that venue, after the 2022, 2023 and 2024 events. The venue was opened to the general public for the final match, with free access granted to the C Upper, C Lower, D Upper, and D Lower stands.

The defending champions, Jaffna Kings, qualified for their fifth LPL final after previously being champions in 2020, 2021, 2022 and 2024. Galle Gallants qualified for their fourth final after previously being runners-up in 2020, 2021 and 2024. The two teams had previously competed in three LPL finals, with Jaffna having won on all three occasions.

== Road to the final ==
Road to the final
Jaffna Kings
vs
Galle Gallants
League stage

League progression
Team	Group matches								Playoffs		
Team	1	2	3	4	5	6	7	8	Q1/E	Q2	F
Jaffna Kings	0	2	4	4	6	8	10	11	W		L
Galle Gallants	2	4	4	6	6	8	8	10	L	W	W

Win	Loss	No result

- Note: The total points at the end of each group match are listed.
- Note: Click on the points (group matches) or W/L (playoffs) to see the match summary.
Opponent
Date
Result
Points
Match
Opponent
Date
Result
Points
Galle Gallants
17 July 2026
Lost
0
1
Jaffna Kings
17 July 2026
Won
2
Dambulla Sixers
19 July 2026
Won
2
2
Colombo Kaps
18 July 2026
Won
4
Colombo Kaps
22 July 2026
Won
4
3
Dambulla Sixers
22 July 2026
Lost
4
Galle Gallants
23 July 2026
Lost
4
4
Jaffna Kings
23 July 2026
Won
6
Kandy Royals
26 July 2026
Won
6
5
Kandy Royals
25 July 2026
Lost
6
Colombo Kaps
28 July 2026
Won
8
6
Dambulla Sixers
26 July 2026
Won
8
Kandy Royals
30 July 2026
Won
10
7
Kandy Royals
29 July 2026
Lost
8
Dambulla Sixers
2 August 2026
N/R
11
8
Colombo Kaps
1 August 2026
Won
10
Playoff stage

Qualifier 1
5 August 2026 – Colombo (RPS)
1	Jaffna Kings	242/2 (20 overs)
2	Galle Gallants	228/8 (20 overs)
Eliminator
5 August 2026 – Colombo (RPS)
3	Colombo Kaps	203/7 (20 overs)
4	Kandy Royals	135 (18.4 overs)

Qualifier 2
7 August 2026 – Colombo (RPS)
Q1L	Galle Gallants	177/4 (18.4 overs)
EW	Colombo Kaps	176 (18.5 overs)

Final
8 August 2026 – Colombo (RPS)
Q1W	Jaffna Kings	123 (19.3 overs)
Q2W	Galle Gallants	126/5 (15.5 overs)

Opponent
Date
Result
Match
Opponent
Date
Result
Galle Gallants
5 August 2026
Won
Q1
Jaffna Kings
5 August 2026
Lost
Qualified for the final
Q2
Colombo Kaps
7 August 2026
Won
2026 Lanka Premier League final

=== Jaffna Kings ===
Jaffna Kings began their season with a loss to Galle. They won their next two matches against Dambulla Sixers and Colombo Kaps, but again lost to Galle. They won their next three matches against Kandy Royals, Colombo and Kandy again. Their last league stage match of the season against Dambulla was abandoned due to rain. As they finished the stage in first place with eleven points, they advanced to Qualifier 1 in the playoffs. They defeated Galle in Qualifier 1 to qualify for the final.

=== Galle Gallants ===
Galle Gallants began their season with two wins against Jaffna and Colombo. They then lost to Dambulla, won against Jaffna, lost to Kandy, won against Dambulla, lost to Kandy and won against Colombo to finish the league stage in second place with ten points and advanced to Qualifier 1 in the playoffs. They lost Qualifier 1 to Jaffna, but won Qualifier 2 against Colombo to qualify for the final.

== Match ==
=== Match officials ===
The on-field umpires for the final were Kumar Dharmasena (SL) and Wayne Knights (NZ), while the third umpire was Raveendra Wimalasiri (SL). Chamara de Soysa (SL) was the reserve umpire and Ranjan Madugalle (SL) was the match referee.

=== Team and toss ===
Jaffna's captain Bhanuka Rajapaksa won the toss and elected to bat.

- Galle Gallants: Eshan Malinga (SUB), Sam Harper (wk), Thomas Rogers, Charith Asalanka, Dinura Kalupahana, Chamika Karunaratne, Sahan Arachchige (IMP), Dasun Shanaka (c), Mohammad Nawaz, Tharindu Rathnayake, Sachindu Colombage, Akif Javed
- Jaffna Kings: Lizaad Williams (IMP), Avishka Fernando, Kamil Mishara (wk), Khawaja Nafay, Tawhid Hridoy (SUB), Bhanuka Rajapaksa (c), Dunith Wellalage, Shakib Al Hasan, Chamindu Wickramasinghe, Mohamed Shiraz, Traveen Mathew, Zahoor Khan

(IMP) indicates an impact player and (SUB) indicates the player who was substituted.

Impact players
Team	Out	In
Galle Gallants	Eshan Malinga	Sahan Arachchige
Jaffna Kings	Tawhid Hridoy	Lizaad Williams

=== Match scorecard ===
Final
8 August 2026
19:30 (N)
Scorecard

Jaffna Kings; 123 (19.3 overs)	v	Galle Gallants; 126/5 (15.5 overs)
Kamil Mishara 41 (32); Charith Asalanka 3/20 (4 overs)		Tom Rogers 34 (27); Traveen Mathew 2/15 (2 overs)

Galle Gallants won by 5 wickets
R. Premadasa Stadium, Colombo
Attendance: 21,000
Umpires: Kumar Dharmasena (SL) and Wayne Knights (NZ)
Player of the match: Charith Asalanka (Galle Gallants)

- Jaffna Kings won the toss and elected to bat.
- This was the second consecutive and fourth overall LPL final between Galle Gallants and Jaffna Kings.
- Galle Gallants won their maiden LPL title.

=== Jaffna Kings innings ===
Opting to bat first, Jaffna opener Avishka Fernando scored 20 runs before being dismissed in the fourth over. Second opener Kamil Mishara scored 41 runs, while four other batters were dismissed for fewer then 10 runs each. Chamindu Wickramasinghe scored 24 runs, while the remaining batters were dismissed for single-digit scores, bundling out Jaffna for 123 runs. Mishara was Jaffna's highest run-scorer, while Charith Asalanka and Eshan Malinga picked up three wickets each for Galle. Asalanka later received the player of the match award for his bowling performance.

Jaffna Kings batting
Player	Status	Runs	Balls	4s	6s	Strike rate
Avishka Fernando	c Rogers b Ratnayake	20	16	2	1	125.00
Kamil Mishara	c Ratnayake b Malinga	41	32	5	0	128.13
Khawaja Nafay	b Asalanka	0	2	0	0	0.00
Tawhid Hridoy (SUB)	c Nawaz b Colombage	10	10	1	0	100.00
Bhanuka Rajapaksa	lbw b Asalanka	3	6	0	0	50.00
Dunith Wellalage	c Kalupahana b Asalanka	3	8	0	0	37.50
Shakib Al Hasan	c Colombage b Malinga	9	13	0	0	69.23
Chamindu Wickramasinghe	c Asalanka b Malinga	24	16	2	1	160.00
Mohamed Shiraz	c †Harper b Javed	1	5	0	0	20.00
Traveen Mathew	not out	1	4	0	0	25.00
Zahoor Khan	b Ratnayake	2	5	0	0	40.00
Extras	(lb 2, w 7)	9				
Total	(10 wickets; 19.3 overs)	123		10	2	RR: 6.30

Fall of wickets: 1–25 (Avishka Fernando, 3.5 ov), 2–31 (Khawaja Nafay, 4.3 ov), 3–51 (Towhid Hridoy, 7.2 ov), 4–62 (Bhanuka Rajapaksa, 8.6 ov), 5–68 (Dunith Wellalage, 10.6 ov), 6–87 (Kamil Mishara, 12.6 ov), 7–106 (Shakib Al Hasan, 16.1 ov), 8–113 (Mohamed Shiraz, 17.4 ov), 9–120 (Chamindu Wickramasinghe, 18.2 ov), 10–123 (Zahoor Khan, 19.3 ov)

Galle Gallants bowling
Bowler	Overs	Maidens	Runs	Wickets	Econ	Wides	NBs
Charith Asalanka	4	0	20	3	5.00	0	0
Tharindu Rathnayake	3.3	0	14	1	4.00	1	0
Akif Javed	4	0	25	1	6.25	0	0
Eshan Malinga (SUB)	4	0	25	3	6.25	2	0
Sachindu Colombage	3	0	27	1	9.00	0	0
Chamika Karunaratne	1	0	10	0	10.00	0	0

=== Galle Gallants innings ===
Chasing the target of 124, Galle opener Sam Harper was dismissed for a single run, followed by Charith Asalanka for 2 runs. Second openers Tom Rogers and Dinura Kalupahana put together a partnership of 64 runs before both batters were dismissed in the ninth over. Chamika Karunaratne and Sahan Arachchige then put together a partnership of 28 runs until the former was dismissed in the fourteenth over. Galle captain Dasun Shanaka scored 20 runs in 9 balls of 15th and 16th overs to take Galle to 126 to secure their maiden LPL title. Rogers and Kalupahana scored 34 and 31 runs for Galle respectively while Traveen Mathew and Shakib Al Hasan picked up two wickets each for Jaffna.

Galle Gallants batting
Player	Status	Runs	Balls	4s	6s	Strike rate
Sam Harper	c Mathew b Shiraz	1	2	0	0	50.00
Thomas Rogers	c Wellalage b Shakib	34	27	5	0	125.92
Charith Asalanka	c Nafay b Mathew	2	3	0	0	66.66
Dinura Kalupahana	b Shakib	31	19	6	0	163.15
Chamika Karunaratne	c Zahoor b Mathew	16	17	1	0	94.11
Sahan Arachchige (IMP)	not out	14	19	1	0	73.68
Dasun Shanaka	not out	20	9	2	1	222.22
Mohammad Nawaz	did not bat					
Tharindu Rathnayake	did not bat					
Sachindu Colombage	did not bat					
Akif Javed	did not bat					
Extras	(lb 2, nb 1, w 5)	8				
Total	(5 wickets; 15.5 overs)	126		15	1	RR: 7.95

Fall of wickets: 1–7 (Sam Harper, 0.4 ov), 2–10 (Charith Asalanka, 1.2 ov), 3–74 (Thomas Rogers, 8.1 ov), 4–75 (Dinura Kalupahana, 8.6 ov), 5–103 (Chamika Karunaratne, 13.3 ov)

Jaffna Kings bowling
Bowler	Overs	Maidens	Runs	Wickets	Econ	Wides	NBs
Mohamed Shiraz	3	0	25	1	8.33	1	0
Traveen Mathew	2	0	15	2	7.50	0	0
Lizaad Williams (IMP)	3.5	0	39	0	10.17	0	1
Shakib Al Hasan	4	0	15	2	3.75	0	0
Dunith Wellalage	2	0	20	0	10.00	0	0
Zahoor Khan	1	0	10	0	10.00	0	0
