= Eshan Malinga =

Sri Lankan cricketer

Personal information
- Full name: Kiribathgala Kankanamalage Eshan Malinga Dharmasena
- Born: 4 February 2001 (age 25); Ratnapura, Sri Lanka
- Nickname: Opanayake Express
- Batting: Left-handed
- Bowling: Right-arm fast medium
- Role: Bowler

International information
- National side: Sri Lanka (2025–present)
- ODI debut (cap 216): 5 January 2025 v New Zealand
- Last ODI: 16 November 2025 v Pakistan
- T20I debut (cap 111): 20 November 2025 v Zimbabwe
- Last T20I: 1 February 2026 v England

Domestic team information
- Years: Team
- 2022–present: Ragama Cricket Club
- 2024: Jaffna Kings
- 2025: Paarl Royals
- 2025–present: Sunrisers Hyderabad
- 2026: Galle Gallants

Career statistics
Competition	ODI	T20I	FC	LA
Matches	7	8	19	21
Runs scored	14	1	50	40
Batting average	4.66	1.00	5.00	8.00
100s/50s	0/0	0/0	0/0	0/0
Top score	4	1	16	7*
Balls bowled	222	137	2,186	836
Wickets	4	8	44	25
Bowling average	55.75	26.87	31.15	34.68
5 wickets in innings	0	0	1	1
10 wickets in match	0	0	0	0
Best bowling	3/35	2/24	5/106	5/49
Catches/stumpings	2/–	3/–	5/–	3/–
- Source: ESPNcricinfo, 8 February 2026

Kiribathgala Kankanamalage Eshan Malinga Dharmasena (born 4 February 2001), more commonly known as Eshan Malinga is a Sri Lankan cricketer.

== Early and personal life ==
Malinga was born on 4 February 2001 in Ratnapura, Sri Lanka. He studied at Sivali Central College, Ratnapura.

== Career ==
Eshan started his cricket career from Sivali College, Ratnapura. He made his first-class debut for Ragama Cricket Club in the 2022–23 Major League Tournament on 2 September 2022. He made his List A debut for Ragama Cricket Club in the 2022–23 Major Clubs Limited Over Tournament on 5 July 2022. He made his Twenty20 debut for Ragama Cricket Club in 2022 Major Clubs T20 Tournament on 25 May 2022.

=== Indian Premier League ===
Eshan was secured by Sunrisers Hyderabad (SRH) at the IPL 2025 mega auctions for ₹1.20 crore, a price four times higher than his ₹30 lakh base price. Malinga had an impressive debut IPL season, finishing with 13 wickets in seven matches.

He was retained by SRH for the 2026 season at his 2025 sold price of ₹1.2 crore. He finished his second IPL season with 20 wickets in 15 matches, making him the 6th highest wicket-taker in the tournament.

He was retained by SRH for the 2027 season at ₹1.20 crore — his third straight season with SRH at the same price.

=== Lanka Premier League ===
In May 2026, he was signed by Galle Gallants as the "Local Star Player" for the Lanka Premier League season 6. He finished the Lanka Premier League season 6 as the tournament's leading wicket-taker with 17 wickets, including a crucial three-wicket haul in the final that helped guide his team to a victory over the Jaffna Kings and secure their maiden LPL title.
