= Dushan Hemantha =

Sri Lankan cricketer (born 1994)

Personal information
- Full name: Munasinghe Arachchige Dushan Ishara Hemantha
- Born: 24 May 1994 (age 32); Colombo, Sri Lanka
- Height: 5 ft 9 in (1.75 m)
- Batting: Right-handed
- Bowling: Right-arm legbreak
- Role: All-rounder

International information
- National side: Sri Lanka (2023-present)
- ODI debut (cap 208): 2 June 2023 v Afghanistan
- Last ODI: 2 November 2023 v India
- T20I debut (cap 110): 3 September 2025 v Zimbabwe
- Last T20I: 12 February 2026 v Oman

Domestic team information
- Years: Team
- 2013–2014: Colts Cricket Club
- 2014–2016: Saracens Sports Club
- 2016–2022: Badureliya Sports Club
- 2017–2019: Sri Lanka Navy Sports Club
- 2020–2022: Burgher Recreation Club
- 2022–present: Dambulla Aura
- 2024: Sylhet Strikers

Career statistics
Competition	ODI	FC	LA	T20
Matches	5	60	103	66
Runs scored	39	2,631	1,633	703
Batting average	19.50	29.56	20.93	16.34
100s/50s	0/0	4/10	1/7	0/1
Top score	22	193	100*	58*
Balls bowled	210	6,584	3,414	897
Wickets	2	163	123	60
Bowling average	96.50	28.45	24.68	16.08
5 wickets in innings	0	7	4	1
10 wickets in match	0	1	0	0
Best bowling	2/49	7/62	6/28	6/23
Catches/stumpings	1/–	19/–	39/–	30/–
Medal record
Men's cricket
Representing Sri Lanka
Asian Games
Bronze medal – third place	2026 Aichi–Nagoya	Team
- Source: Cricinfo, 14 March 2025

Dushan Hemantha (born 24 May 1994) is a Sri Lankan cricketer. He is an all-rounder who bats right-handed and bowls right-arm leg spin. He currently plays for Dambulla Aura in domestic cricket.

== Early life ==
Hemantha first learnt how to play cricket from his father, Sujith Hemantha, who is also a cricket coach. His passion and enthusiasm regarding cricket was identified by his father when Hemantha was just seven years old. Hemantha initially showed signs of being an offspinner but his father convinced him to bowl leg-spin with the thought process that he could have better guile and it could give him better chance of bowling accurately to pick up wickets.

He was convinced by Sajith Jayalal who then served as the national athletic coach to join the junior national athletic squad. However, Hemantha initially refused the offer but after some negotiations and deliberations he agreed to join the junior national athletic squad. He eventually took part at the South Asian Junior Athletics Championships in the same year and claimed a bronze medal in the men's 1500m race category. He continued to participate in athletic zonal events and sports meets while also progressing with his cricketing ambitions.

He completed his secondary schooling at St. Peter’s College. He captained his school under-19 team in the 2012–13 season, and won the best captain’s award at the all island schools cricket awards. He rose to prominence during his schooling years under the watchful eyes of his school coaches L. H. Sunil and Keerthi Gunaratne.

He represented St. Peter's College in four successive years in the annual Battle of the Saints big match encounter. He made his maiden Big Match appearance in 2010 and St. Peter's College eventually secured victory to register their first victory in the Battle of the Saints big match encounter after a long gap of 32 years. He was appointed as the vice-captain of St. Peter's College in the 2012 Battle of the Saints encounter and played a pivotal role in helping his school win the 78th Battle of the Blues encounter by picking up seven wickets for the match to defeat rivals St. Joseph's College.

He had a stellar 2012/13 school cricket season where he showed his all-round prowess taking 60 wickets and scoring 840 runs and for his performance in the 2012/13 school cricket season, he was adjudged the Runner-up in the 2013 Sunday Observer Schoolboy Cricketer of the Year.

== Domestic career ==
He made his first-class debut for Colts Cricket Club in the 2013–14 Premier Trophy on 21 February 2014. He made his Twenty20 debut for Colts Cricket Club on 25 February 2014, against Hong Kong. He made his List A debut for Saracens Sports Club on 13 December 2014, against Colombo Cricket Club in the 2014–15 Premier Limited Overs Tournament.

Hemantha played for Sri Lanka Navy Sports Club in the 2017–18 Premier League Tournament Tier B. On 2 February 2017, he picked up his maiden first-class five-wicket haul, with figures of 7 for 62, against Lankan Cricket Club. On 29 December 2017, he also claimed his maiden century in first-class cricket, scoring 193 runs against Panadura Sports Club.

He scored his maiden List A half-century on 4 March 2019, against Moors Sports Club in the 2018–19 Premier Limited Overs Tournament. He played for Burgher Recreation Club in the 2020–21 Major Clubs Limited Over Tournament. On 3 April 2021, he made his maiden century in List A cricket against Bloomfield Cricket and Athletic Club.

Hemanth took his maiden five-wicket haul in List A cricket on 21 November 2021, against Kandy Customs Sports Club in the 2021–22 Major Clubs Limited Over Tournament.

In July 2022, he was signed by the Dambulla Giants for the third edition of the Lanka Premier League. He received his maiden call-up for the Sri Lanka A team for the series against England Lions, following his breakthrough performance in 2022/23 season representing Burgher Recreation Club showing his all-round prowess with the bat and ball scoring in excess of 500 runs and picking up a tally of 40 wickets.

He also played an instrumental role in helping Dambulla to clinch the 2023 National Super League Limited Overs Tournament by being the pick of the bowlers bagging 13 wickets at an healthy average of 13.61.

== International career ==
In January 2023, he was named in Sri Lanka A's squad for their first-class and List A series against the England Lions. On 18 February 2023, he bagged a five-wicket haul, helping his team to defeat the England Lions in the second unofficial ODI. He took eleven wickets in the List A series at an health average of 11.45 and was named the player of the series for his bowling performance. In April 2023, Hemantha earned his maiden call-up to the Sri Lanka cricket team for their Test series against Ireland, following his impressive performances against the England Lions. He was supposed to play in the second and final test match of the series against Ireland, but Sri Lankan team management decided to stick with the winning combination after the first test.

In May 2023, he was named in Sri Lanka's One Day International (ODI) squad for their series against Afghanistan. He made his ODI debut in the first ODI of the series, on 2 June 2023.
