= Sahan Arachchige =

Sri Lankan cricketer (born 1996)

Personal information
- Full name: Sahan Shashintha Diyamantha Arachchige
- Born: 13 May 1996 (age 30); Ragama, Sri Lanka
- Batting: Left-handed
- Bowling: Right-arm off-break
- Role: Batting all-rounder

International information
- National side: Sri Lanka (2023-present)
- ODI debut (cap 210): 7 July 2023 v West Indies
- Last ODI: 11 January 2024 v Zimbabwe
- Only T20I (cap 99): 4 October 2023 v Afghanistan

Domestic team information
- Years: Team
- 2015–2018: Colts Cricket Club
- 2018–2019: Negombo Cricket Club
- 2019–present: Nondescripts Cricket Club
- 2020–present: Galle Gallants
- 2026: Kathmandu Gorkhas

Career statistics
Competition	ODI	T20I	FC	LA
Matches	5	1	71	103
Runs scored	89	22	3,778	2,516
Batting average	29.66	22.00	38.94	32.67
100s/50s	0/1	0/0	8/23	1/18
Top score	57	22	167	120
Balls bowled	42	21	4,193	2,705
Wickets	1	2	51	70
Bowling average	28.00	13.00	45.45	29.27
5 wickets in innings	0	0	0	1
10 wickets in match	0	0	0	0
Best bowling	1/18	2/26	4/34	5/26
Catches/stumpings	2/–	1/–	57/0	40/–
Medal record
Men's cricket
Representing Sri Lanka
Asian Games
Bronze medal – third place	2026 Aichi–Nagoya	Team
- Source: Cricinfo, 18 March 2025

Sahan Shashintha Diyamantha Arachchige (born 13 May 1996), is a professional Sri Lankan cricketer who currently plays limited overs cricket for the national team. He made his first-class debut for Colts Cricket Club in the 2015–16 Premier League Tournament on 2 January 2016.

In August 2018, he was named in Galle's squad the 2018 SLC T20 League. In October 2020, he was drafted by the Galle Gladiators for the inaugural edition of the Lanka Premier League. In August 2021, he was named in the SLC Blues team for the 2021 SLC Invitational T20 League tournament.

In June 2022, he was named in the Sri Lanka A squad for their matches against Australia A during Australia's tour of Sri Lanka.

== International career ==
In March 2023, he was named in both One Day International and Twenty20 International squad for the series against New Zealand.

He made his ODI debut against West Indies in 2023 Cricket World Cup Qualifier, on 7 July 2023. In 2023, he captained the T20I side for the 2022 Asian Games against Afghanistan. However, Sri Lanka lost the match and disqualified from the final.

In 2026, he captained the Sri Lankan team at the 2026 Asian Games and won the bronze medal by defeating Bangladesh.
