= Ravindra Kottahachchi =

Sri Lankan cricket umpire (born 1975)

Personal information
- Born: 2 August 1975 (age 51); Kaluthara
- Role: Umpire

Umpiring information
- ODIs umpired: 2 (2026)
- T20Is umpired: 5 (2026)
- WODIs umpired: 5 (2008–2016)
- WT20Is umpired: 3 (2015–2023)
- Source: Cricinfo, 23 March 2018

Ravindra Kottahachchi (born 2 August 1975) is a Sri Lankan cricket umpire. He has umpired in domestic matches in cricket tournaments in Sri Lanka, such as the 2017–18 SLC Twenty20 Tournament and the 2017–18 Premier League Tournament. In March 2018, he was one of the two onfield umpires for the semi-final match between Nondescripts Cricket Club and Saracens Sports Club in the 2017–18 Premier Limited Overs Tournament.

In international cricket, he has stood in a Women's One Day International match between Sri Lanka and Australia in September 2016 and a two-day match during Bangladesh's tour of Sri Lanka in March 2017.

== See also ==
- List of One Day International cricket umpires
- List of Twenty20 International cricket umpires
