= Sam Harper (cricketer) =

Australian cricketer (born 1996)

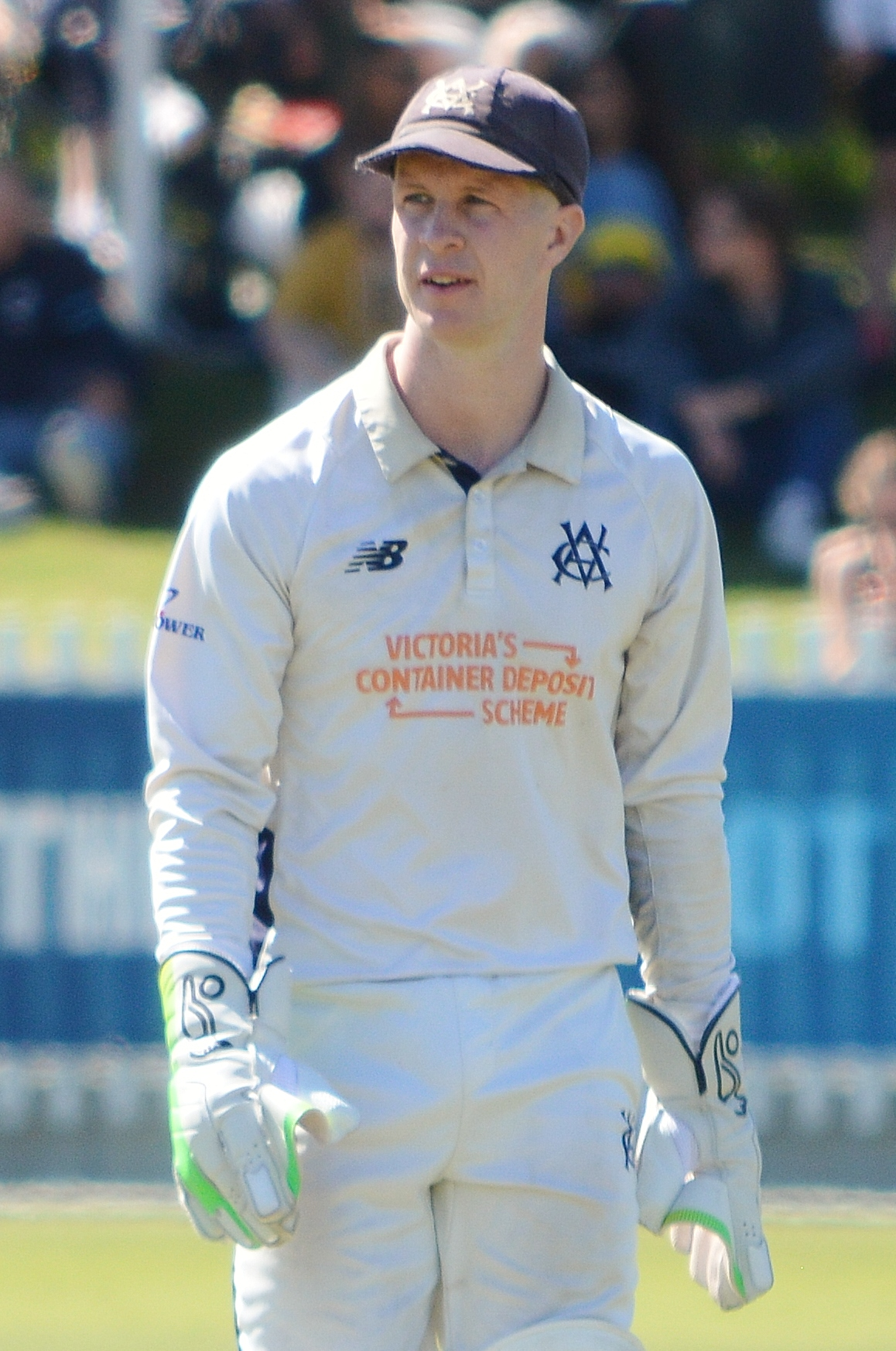
- Harper playing First Class cricket with Victoria in March 2026

Personal information
- Full name: Samuel Bryan Harper
- Born: 10 December 1996 (age 29); Wantirna, Victoria, Australia
- Batting: Right-handed
- Role: Wicket-keeper-batter

International information
- National side: Australia (2026–present)
- Only T20I (cap 119): 21 November 2026 v England
- T20I shirt no.: 76

Domestic team information
- Years: Team
- 2015/16–present: Victoria
- 2016/17: Cricket Australia XI
- 2016/17: Melbourne Stars
- 2018/19–2022/23: Melbourne Renegades
- 2023/24–present: Melbourne Stars
- 2026–present: Galle Gallants

Career statistics
Competition	T20I	FC	LA	T20
Matches	1	71	50	115
Runs scored	32	3,011	1,232	2,469
Batting average	32.00	28.14	26.78	24.20
100s/50s	0/0	6/11	0/10	1/15
Top score	32	151	96	110*
Catches/stumpings	1/0	258/11	59/8	72/13
- Source: Cricinfo, 21 November 2026

Samuel Bryan Harper (born 10 December 1996) is an Australian cricketer. He made his first-class debut for Victoria on 3 February 2016 in the 2015–16 Sheffield Shield. He made his Twenty20 (T20) debut for Melbourne Stars on 26 December 2016 in the 2016–17 Big Bash League season.

In 2022, Harper was studying for a Bachelor of Health and Physical Education at Deakin University.

In July 2023, it was announced that Harper would rejoin the Melbourne Stars for the 2023/24 season following a trade, with Adam Zampa joining the Melbourne Renegades.

In October 2026, Harper received his maiden call up to international cricket, drafted in for the series as cover for regular wicketkeeper Alex Carey on Australia's tour of South Africa. However, Harper did not play a match in the series.

In November 2026, Harper was selected to Australia's squad for the T20I series against England.Harper made his debut in the first T20I, scoring 32 runs off 15 balls in the second innings.
