= Kamil Mishara =

Sri Lanka cricketer (born 2001)

Personal information
- Full name: Rajapaksha Vidana Pathiranalage Kamil Mishara
- Born: 24 April 2001 (age 25); Colombo, Sri Lanka
- Batting: Left-handed
- Bowling: Right-arm off-break
- Role: Batsman

International information
- National side: Sri Lanka (2022–present)
- Test debut: 23 August 2026 v India
- ODI debut (cap 218): 11 November 2025 v Pakistan
- Last ODI: 22 January 2026 v England
- T20I debut (cap 94): 20 February 2022 v Australia
- Last T20I: 11 January 2026 v Pakistan

Domestic team information
- Years: Team
- 2016/17: Panadura
- 2018/19–present: Nondescripts
- 2021: Kandy Warriors
- 2026: Jaffna Kings
- 2026: Chitwan Rhinos

Career statistics
| Competition | Test | ODI | T20I | FC |
|---|---|---|---|---|
| Matches | 1 | 6 | 28 | 50 |
| Runs scored | 51 | 148 | 584 | 3,572 |
| Batting average | 25.50 | 24.66 | 23.36 | 46.38 |
| 100s/50s | 0/0 | 0/0 | 0/4 | 9/15 |
| Top score | 32 | 38 | 76 | 187* |
| Balls bowled | 24 | 6 | 6 | 558 |
| Wickets | 0 | 0 | 0 | 4 |
| Bowling average | – | – | – | 91.25 |
| 5 wickets in innings | – | – | – | 0 |
| 10 wickets in match | – | – | – | 0 |
| Best bowling | – | – | – | 1/5 |
| Catches/stumpings | 1/0 | 0/0 | 6/1 | 60/5 |
- Source: Cricinfo, 20 November 2026

Rajapaksha Vidana Pathiranalage Kamil Mishara, popularly Kamil Mishara (Sinhala: කමිල් මිෂාර, [kamil miʃaːrə]; born 24 April 2001), is a professional Sri Lankan cricketer, currently plays T20 Internationals for national team.

== Early life ==
Mishara studied at Mahanama College, Panadura, where he laid the foundation for his education and cricketing development up to Grade 11. He then moved to Royal College, Colombo, to pursue his higher studies, continuing to represent the school in cricket competitions.

During the year 2019, Mishara was named and awarded as School boy cricketer of the year where he became the fourth Royalist to win this title. Mishara made the highest individual score of the school cricket season 2019, when he thumped a career best 250 off 270 balls including 32 fours and 5 sixes, against Ananda College in their Singer Trophy Under 19 match played during the year 2019.

== Domestic career ==
He made his Twenty20 debut for Nondescripts Cricket Club in the 2018–19 SLC Twenty20 Tournament on 19 February 2019. In January 2020, he was named in Sri Lanka's squad for the 2020 Under-19 Cricket World Cup. He made his List A debut on 24 March 2021, for Nondescripts Cricket Club in the 2020–21 Major Clubs Limited Over Tournament.

In August 2021, he was named in the SLC Greens team for the 2021 SLC Invitational T20 League tournament. In November 2021, he was selected to play for the Kandy Warriors following the players' draft for the 2021 Lanka Premier League.

In 2025, he made unbeaten 158 against Galle in National Super League but in a losing cause.

== International career ==
In August 2021, he was named in Sri Lanka's Test squad for their series against the West Indies. In January 2022, he was named in Sri Lanka's Twenty20 International (T20I) squad for their series against Australia. He made his T20I debut on 20 February 2022, for Sri Lanka against Australia.

In 2025, Mishara was called for the Zimbabwe tour. In the third T20I, he made his maiden T20I fifty and made an unbroken 117 runs for the third wicket with Kusal Perera. Sri Lanka chased the target of 192 in 18 overs and won the series 2-1, where Mishara was adjudged man of the match. In the T20I against Bangladesh in the group game of 2025 Asia Cup, Mishara made match winning unbeaten 46, where Sri Lanka comfortably won the match by 6 wickets. He won the man of the match for the consecutive time.

=== International ban ===
In April 2022, he was named in Sri Lanka's Test squad for their series against Bangladesh. In May 2022 during Bangladesh tour, Mishara met a ‘visitor’ to his hotel room even though the team was under semi-bubble during COVID pandemic. He was immediately expelled from national team midway through the second Test of the series and handed one year ban.
