= Lahiru Udara =

Sri Lankan cricketer

Personal information
- Full name: Lahiru Udara Igalagamage
- Born: 27 November 1993 (age 32); Kalubowila, Sri Lanka
- Batting: Right-handed
- Role: Wicket-keeper-batter

International information
- National side: Sri Lanka (2023—present)
- Test debut (cap 168): 17 June 2025 v Bangladesh
- Last Test: 3 July 2026 v West Indies
- Only T20I (cap 104): 4 October 2023 v Afghanistan

Domestic team information
- Years: Team
- 2013–present: Nondescripts Cricket Club
- 2020: Colombo Kings
- 2021: Dambulla Giants
- 2022: Galle Gladiators
- 2023: Colombo Strikers
- 2024: Dambulla Sixers
- 2026: Kandy Royals

Career statistics
Competition	T20I	FC	LA	T20
Matches	1	104	94	71
Runs scored	0	7,198	2,724	1,252
Batting average	0	41.84	31.67	20.19
100s/50s	0/0	15/37	3/19	0/4
Top score	0	290*	110	94
Balls bowled	–	454	139	–
Wickets	–	9	3	–
Bowling average	–	34.88	33.00	–
5 wickets in innings	–	0	0	–
10 wickets in match	–	0	0	–
Best bowling	–	4/7	1/3	–
Catches/stumpings	0/0	162/28	90/18	30/16
- Source: ESPNcricinfo, 14 August 2024

Lahiru Udara Igalagamage (born 27 November 1993) is a Sri Lankan cricketer. He made his first-class debut for Nondescripts Cricket Club in the 2013–14 Premier Trophy on 17 January 2014. In March 2018, he was named in Colombo's squad for the 2017–18 Super Four Provincial Tournament. He was the leading run-scorer in the 2019–20 Premier League Tournament, with 1,039 runs in nine matches. In October 2020, he was drafted by the Colombo Kings for the inaugural edition of the Lanka Premier League.

In July 2021, he was named in Sri Lanka's squad for their series against India. The following month, he was named in the SLC Greens team for the 2021 SLC Invitational T20 League tournament. In November 2021, he was selected to play for the Dambulla Giants following the players' draft for the 2021 Lanka Premier League.

== International career ==
In June 2022, he was named in the Sri Lanka A squad for their matches against Australia A during Australia's tour of Sri Lanka.

Lahiru Udara made his only T20I appearance and International debut in the 2022 Asian Games against Afghanistan in October 2023, in his only innings, he made 0(3) and he did not bowl, Sri Lanka eventually lost the match by 8 runs

Udara made his Test debut in the series against Bangladesh on the 17th June 2025, in his first innings he made 29(34) with 6 fours, and 9(13) with 2 fours, in his 2nd test match on the 25—28 June 2025, he scored 40(65) with 4 fours, ending the series with 78 runs off 112 balls at and average of 26

On 3 July 2026 in the 2nd Test against West Indies, Udara hit his maiden test century, off 117 balls. He ended up scoring 188 off 248 balls.

== International centuries ==
=== Key ===
- * – Remained not out
- † – Man of the match
- (A) – Away venue

=== Test Centuries ===
No.	Score	Against	Pos.	Inn.	Test	S/R	Venue	Date	Result	Ref
1	188	West Indies	1	1	2/2	75.81	Sir Vivian Richards Stadium, North Sound (A)	3 July 2026	Drawn	
