= 2024 Lanka Premier League final =

Final match of the LPL 2024

2024 Lanka Premier League Final
- Match programme cover
- Event: 2024 Lanka Premier League
| Galle Marvels | Jaffna Kings |
| 184/6 | 185/1 |
| 20 overs | 15.4 overs |
- Jaffna Kings won by 9 wickets
- Date: 21 July 2024
- Venue: R. Premadasa Stadium, Colombo
- Player of the match: Rilee Rossouw (Jaffna Kings)
- Umpires: Kumar Dharmasena (Sri Lanka); Raveendra Wimalasiri (Sri Lanka)

The 2024 Lanka Premier League Final was played on 21 July 2024 at the R. Premadasa Stadium in Colombo. Galle Marvels qualified for the finals after their win in Qualifier 1. They will competed with Jaffna Kings, who qualified for the finals after their winning in Qualifier 2.

For the first time in Sri Lanka a lazer show involving 500 drones was shown to the spectators before the start of the match. Jaffna Kings won the toss and elected to field first. Batting first Galle Marvels made 184 runs off 6 wickets in their 20 overs. In response, Jaffna Kings chased the target in 15.4 overs and won the match by 9 wickets. Thus, Jaffna Kings won their fourth LPL title. Rilee Rossouw from Jaffna Kings was named as the player of the match as well as the player of the tournament.

== Road to the final ==
| Galle Marvels | | | vs | Jaffna Kings |
League Stage
| Opponent | Scorecard | Result | Titles | Opponent | Scorecard | Result |
| Jaffna Kings | 2 July 2024 | Won | Match 1 | Galle Marvels | 2 July 2024 | Lost |
| Colombo Strikers | 3 July 2024 | Won | Match 2 | Dambulla Sixers | 3 July 2024 | Won |
| Jaffna Kings | 5 July 2024 | Lost | Match 3 | Galle Marvels | 5 July 2024 | Won |
| Kandy Falcons | 7 July 2024 | Won | Match 4 | Dambulla Sixers | 6 July 2024 | Won |
| Dambulla Sixers | 9 July 2024 | Lost | Match 5 | Kandy Falcons | 9 July 2024 | Lost |
| Kandy Falcons | 10 July 2024 | Won | Match 6 | Colombo Strikers | 10 July 2024 | Won |
| Dambulla Sixers | 14 July 2024 | Won | Match 7 | Kandy Falcons | 13 July 2024 | Won |
| Colombo Strikers | 15 July 2024 | Lost | Match 8 | Colombo Strikers | 14 July 2024 | Lost |
| Qualifier 1 | | | | Qualifier 1 |
| Opponent | Scorecard | Result | Titles | Opponent | Scorecard | Result |
| Jaffna Kings | 18 July 2024 | Won | Match 9 | Galle Marvels | 18 July 2024 | Lost |
| | | | | Qualifier 2 |
| | | | | Opponent | Scorecard | Result |
| — | | | Match 10 | Kandy Falcons | 20 July 2024 | Won |
2024 Lanka Premier League Final

== Match ==
=== Match officials ===
- On-field umpires: Kumar Dharmasena (SL) and Raveendra Wimalasiri (SL)
- Third umpire: Ruchira Palliyaguruge (SL)
- Reserve umpire: Chamara de Soysa (SL)
- Match referee: Ranjan Madugalle (SL)

=== Summary ===
Match 24
21 July 2024
19:30 (N)
Scorecard

| Galle Marvels; 184/6 (20 overs) | v | Jaffna Kings; 185/1 (15.4 overs) |
| Bhanuka Rajapaksa 82 (34); Asitha Fernando 3/35 (4 overs) | | Rilee Rossouw 106* (53); Dwaine Pretorius 1/18 (2.4 overs) |

Jaffna Kings won by 9 wickets
R. Premadasa Stadium, Colombo
Umpires: Kumar Dharmasena (SL) and Raveendra Wimalasiri (SL)
Player of the match: Rilee Rossouw (Jaffna Kings)

- Jaffna Kings won the toss and elected to field.

=== Match scorecard ===
==== 1st innings ====
Galle Marvels batting
| Player | Status | Runs | Balls | 4s | 6s | Strike rate |
|---|---|---|---|---|---|---|
| Alex Hales | c Dhananjaya b Behrendorff | 6 | 9 | 0 | 0 | 66.66 |
| Niroshan Dickwella (c, wk) | b Behrendorff | 5 | 8 | 0 | 0 | 62.50 |
| Tim Seifert | b Asitha | 47 | 37 | 2 | 4 | 127.02 |
| Janith Liyanage | c Allen b Asitha | 7 | 8 | 1 | 0 | 87.50 |
| Bhanuka Rajapaksa | b Asitha | 82 | 34 | 8 | 6 | 241.17 |
| Sahan Arachchige | c Dhananjaya b Azmatullah | 16 | 14 | 2 | 0 | 114.28 |
| Dwaine Pretorius | not out | 12 | 10 | 0 | 1 | 120.00 |
| Isuru Udana | not out | 2 | 1 | 0 | 0 | 200.00 |
| Prabath Jayasuriya | did not bat | | | | | |
| Kavindu Nadeeshan | did not bat | | | | | |
| Maheesh Theekshana | did not bat | | | | | |
| Extras | (nb 1, w 2, b 4) | 7 | | | | |
| Total | (6 wickets; 20 overs) | 184 | | 13 | 11 | RR: 9.20 |

Fall of wickets: 1/8 (Dickwella, 1.5 ov), 2/13 (Hales, 3.6 ov), 3/24 (Janith, 6.5 ov), 4/86 (Seifert, 12.1 ov), 5/158 (Sahan, 17.1 ov), 6/172 (Bhanuka, 18.6 ov)

Jaffna Kings bowling
| Bowler | Overs | Maidens | Runs | Wickets | Econ | Wides | NBs |
|---|---|---|---|---|---|---|---|
| Dhananjaya de Silva | 2 | 0 | 14 | 0 | 7.00 | 0 | 1 |
| Jason Behrendorff | 4 | 0 | 18 | 2 | 4.50 | 1 | 0 |
| Fabian Allen | 2 | 0 | 10 | 0 | 5.00 | 0 | 0 |
| Asitha Fernando | 4 | 0 | 35 | 3 | 8.75 | 1 | 0 |
| Vijayakanth Viyaskanth | 3 | 0 | 39 | 0 | 13.00 | 0 | 0 |
| Azmatullah Omarzai | 3 | 0 | 29 | 1 | 9.66 | 0 | 1 |
| Charith Asalanka | 2 | 0 | 25 | 0 | 17.50 | 0 | 0 |

==== 2nd innings ====
Jaffna Kings batting
| Player | Status | Runs | Balls | 4s | 6s | Strike rate |
|---|---|---|---|---|---|---|
| Pathum Nissanka | c †Dickwella b Pretorius | 0 | 1 | 0 | 0 | 0.00 |
| Kusal Mendis (wk) | not out | 72 | 40 | 8 | 2 | 180.00 |
| Rilee Rossouw | not out | 106 | 53 | 9 | 7 | 200.00 |
| Avishka Fernando | did not bat | | | | | |
| Charith Asalanka (c) | did not bat | | | | | |
| Dhananjaya de Silva | did not bat | | | | | |
| Azmatullah Omarzai | did not bat | | | | | |
| Fabian Allen | did not bat | | | | | |
| Vijayakanth Viyaskanth | did not bat | | | | | |
| Jason Behrendorff | did not bat | | | | | |
| Asitha Fernando | did not bat | | | | | |
| Extras | (lb 2, w 5) | 7 | | | | |
| Total | (1 wicket; 15.4 overs) | 185 | | 17 | 9 | RR: 11.80 |

Fall of wickets: 1/0 (Pathum, 0.1 ov)

Galle Marvels bowling
| Bowler | Overs | Maidens | Runs | Wickets | Econ | Wides | NBs |
|---|---|---|---|---|---|---|---|
| Dwaine Pretorius | 2.4 | 0 | 18 | 1 | 6.75 | 2 | 1 |
| Isuru Udana | 3 | 0 | 42 | 0 | 14.00 | 1 | 0 |
| Maheesh Theekshana | 4 | 0 | 34 | 0 | 8.50 | 0 | 0 |
| Sahan Arachchige | 1 | 0 | 20 | 0 | 20.00 | 0 | 0 |
| Prabath Jayasuriya | 1 | 0 | 16 | 0 | 16.00 | 1 | 0 |
| Janith Liyanage | 2 | 0 | 30 | 0 | 15.00 | 1 | 1 |
| Kavindu Nadeeshan | 2 | 0 | 23 | 0 | 11.50 | 0 | 0 |
