= 2024 Galle Marvels season =

2024 season of Galle Marvels in the Lanka Premier League

Galle Marvels
2024 season
- Official logo of Galle Marvels
- Coach: Graham Ford
- Captain: Niroshan Dickwella
- Tournament performance: Runners-up
- Most runs: Tim Seifert (400)
- Most wickets: Isuru Udana (14)

The Galle Marvels (abbreviated as GM) is a franchise cricket team which competes in 2024 Lanka Premier League. The team is based in Galle, Southern Province, Sri Lanka. The team was captained by Niroshan Dickwella and coached by Graham Ford.

== Squad ==
- Players with international caps are listed in **bold**
- Ages as of the first match of the season

| No. | Name | Nationality | Date of birth (age) | Batting style | Bowling style | Year signed | Salary (US$) | Notes |
Batters
| 33 | Lasith Croospulle | Sri Lanka | 4 October 1998 (aged 25) | Right handed | Right-arm off break | 2023 | Retained | |
| | **Alex Hales** | England | 3 January 1989 (aged 35) | Right handed | Right-arm medium | 2024 | Direct signing | Overseas |
| 54 | **Bhanuka Rajapaksa** | Sri Lanka | 24 October 1991 (aged 32) | Left handed | Right-arm medium | 2023 | Retained | |
| | Sadisha Rajapaksa | Sri Lanka | 30 June 2004 (aged 20) | Right handed | Right-arm off break | 2024 | 5,000 | |
| | Pasindu Sooriyabandara | Sri Lanka | 19 October 1999 (aged 24) | Right handed | —N/a | 2024 | 5,000 | |
Wicket-keepers
| 48 | **Niroshan Dickwella** | Sri Lanka | 23 June 1993 (aged 31) | Left handed | —N/a | 2024 | Direct signing | Captain |
| 43 | **Tim Seifert** | New Zealand | 14 December 1994 (aged 29) | Right handed | —N/a | 2023 | Retained | Overseas |
All-rounders
| | **Sahan Arachchige** | Sri Lanka | 13 May 1996 (aged 28) | Left handed | Right-arm off break | 2024 | 20,000 | |
| | **Dhananjaya Lakshan** | Sri Lanka | 5 October 1998 (aged 25) | Left handed | Right-arm medium-fast | 2024 | 10,000 | |
| 17 | **Janith Liyanage** | Sri Lanka | 12 July 1995 (aged 28) | Right handed | Right-arm medium-fast | 2024 | 36,000 | |
| | Kavindu Nadeeshan | Sri Lanka | 31 August 2001 (aged 22) | Right handed | Right-arm leg break | 2024 | 5,000 | |
| 29 | **Dwaine Pretorius** | South Africa | 29 March 1989 (aged 35) | Right handed | Right-arm medium-fast | 2024 | 30,000 | Overseas |
| 50 | Malsha Tharupathi | Sri Lanka | 4 November 2004 (aged 19) | Right handed | Right-arm leg break | 2024 | 25,000 | |
| 17 | **Isuru Udana** | Sri Lanka | 17 February 1988 (aged 36) | Right handed | Left-arm medium-fast | 2024 | 100,000 | |
| | Chamindu Wijesinghe | Sri Lanka | 3 September 2000 (aged 23) | Right handed | Right-arm medium-fast | 2024 | 5,000 | |
| 14 | **Sean Williams** | Zimbabwe | 26 September 1986 (aged 37) | Left handed | Slow left-arm orthodox | 2024 | 20,000 | Overseas |
Spin bowlers
| 77 | **Prabath Jayasuriya** | Sri Lanka | 5 November 1991 (aged 32) | Right handed | Slow left-arm orthodox | 2024 | 10,000 | |
| —N/a | Yuri Koththigoda | Sri Lanka | 7 January 2006 (aged 18) | Left handed | Left-arm leg spin | 2024 | 5,000 | |
| 88 | **Mujeeb Ur Rahman** | Afghanistan | 28 March 2001 (aged 23) | Right handed | Right-arm leg break | 2024 | 50,000 | Overseas |
| 61 | **Maheesh Theekshana** | Sri Lanka | 1 August 2000 (aged 23) | Right handed | Right-arm off break | 2024 | Direct signing | Local Icon Player; Vice Captain |
| 46 | **Jeffrey Vandersay** | Sri Lanka | 5 February 1990 (aged 34) | Right handed | Right-arm leg break | 2024 | 30,000 | |
Pace bowlers
| 19 | **Zahoor Khan** | United Arab Emirates | 25 May 1989 (aged 35) | Right handed | Right-arm medium-fast | 2024 | 10,000 | Overseas |
| 8 | **Lahiru Kumara** | Sri Lanka | 13 February 1997 (aged 27) | Left handed | Right-arm fast | 2024 | 30,000 | |
| | Mohamed Shiraz | Sri Lanka | 13 February 1995 (aged 29) | Right handed | Right-arm medium-fast | 2024 | 10,000 | |

== Season standing ==
=== League table ===
| Pos | Team | Pld | W | L | Pts | NRR | Qualification |
|---|---|---|---|---|---|---|---|
| 1 | Galle Marvels (R) | 8 | 5 | 3 | 10 | −0.059 | Advanced to Qualifier 1 |
| 2 | Jaffna Kings (C) | 8 | 5 | 3 | 10 | −0.392 | Advanced to Qualifier 1 |
| 3 | Colombo Strikers (4th) | 8 | 4 | 4 | 8 | 0.583 | Advanced to Eliminator |
| 4 | Kandy Falcons (3rd) | 8 | 3 | 5 | 6 | 0.033 | Advanced to Eliminator |
| 5 | Dambulla Sixers | 8 | 3 | 5 | 6 | −0.269 | |

Source: ESPNCricinfo

=== Matches ===
denotes the winning team. denotes the losing team.
| Date | Match No. | Opponent | Toss | Result | Man of the match | Notes |
Group stage
| 2 July | 2 | Jaffna Kings | Kings elected to bat. | Marvels won by 5 wickets | Alex Hales (GM) | |
| 3 July | 5 | Colombo Strikers | Strikers elected to bowl. | Marvels won by 7 runs | Isuru Udana (GM) | |
| 5 July | 6 | Jaffna Kings | Kings elected to bowl. | Kings won by 5 wickets | Azmatullah Omarzai (JK) | |
| 7 July | 9 | Kandy Falcons | Marvels elected to field. | Marvels won by 6 wickets | Isuru Udana (GM) | |
| 9 July | 12 | Dambulla Sixers | Marvels elected to field | Sixers won by 25 runs | Chamindu Wickramasinghe (DS) | |
| 10 July | 14 | Kandy Falcons | Marvels elected to field | Marvels won by 8 wickets | Prabath Jayasuriya (GM) | |
| 14 July | 16 | Dambulla Sixers | Sixers elected to field | Marvels won by super over | Maheesh Theekshana (GM) | |
| 15 July | 19 | Colombo Strikers | Strikers elected to field. | Strikers won by 7 wickets | Matheesha Pathirana (CS) | |
Play-offs
| 18 July | 21 (Q1) | Jaffna Kings | Marvels elected to field. | Marvels won by 7 wickets | Dwaine Pretorius (GM) | |
| 21 July | 24 (F) | Jaffna Kings | Kings elected to field. | Kings won by 9 wickets | Rilee Rossouw (JK) | |

== Administration and support staff ==
| Position | Name |
|---|---|
| Head coach | Graham Ford |
| Assistant coach | Chamara Kapugedera |
| Bowling and fielding coach | Anton Roux |
