= 2024 Lanka Premier League =

Fifth edition of Lanka Premier League

- Dates: 1 – 21 July 2024
- Administrator: Sri Lanka Cricket
- Cricket format: Twenty20
- Tournament format(s): Double round-robin and playoffs
- Champions: Jaffna Kings (4th title)
- Runners-up: Galle Marvels
- Participants: 5
- Matches: 24
- Player of the series: Rilee Rossouw (Jaffna Kings)
- Most runs: Tim Seifert (Galle Marvels) (400)
- Most wickets: Shadab Khan (Colombo Strikers) (17)
- Official website: Lanka Premier League

The 2024 Lanka Premier League, also known as the LPL 5, was the fifth edition of the Lanka Premier League (LPL), a Twenty20 franchise cricket tournament in Sri Lanka. The league was organized by the Sri Lanka Cricket. The tournament began on 1 July and the final was played on 21 July 2024. Five franchise teams took part in a double round-robin league followed by a playoffs. Kandy Falcons, formerly known as B-Love Kandy, were the defending champions.

In the final, Jaffna Kings defeated Galle Marvels by nine wickets to win their fourth LPL title.

== Background ==
On 16 February 2024, it was announced that the fifth season of the tournament would begin on July 1, 2024, two days after the conclusion of the 2024 ICC Men's T20 World Cup.

Dambulla Aura was purchased by Imperial Sports Group, who renamed it Dambulla Thunders. But later, LPL terminated the Dambulla Thunders contract when its co-owner Tamim Rahman was arrested on match-fixing charges. Following that, Sequoia Consultants through DeSilva Holdings got ownership of the Dambulla franchise and renamed it Dambulla Sixers. Galle Titans changed to Galle Marvels after Cricket Marvels LLC owned by Prem Thakkar acquired the franchise. B-Love Kandy was terminated due to violation of contractual obligations and were replaced by Kandy Falcons.

Michael Clarke was announced as the brand ambassador for LPL 2024.

Matches at LPL 2024 featured two "power-blast overs", which would be the 16th and 17th overs of each completed innings, where a maximum of four fielders were allowed outside the 30-yard circle.

== Player auction ==
The auction was held on 21 May 2024, where the five franchises were allowed to spend a maximum of US$500,000 each. The auction was held at Hilton Colombo.

Each team was allowed to have a squad of 20-24 players, inclusive of a mandatory six overseas players and 14-19 domestic players. Any money not spent from the pre-signing kitty could not be carried over to the auction. The teams also had a right-to-match option for their players, and the money for that had to come from within the auction kitty.

Bidding took place between two teams at any given time, with a third team allowed to join the bidding only once one of the first two teams had withdrawn from the process. An "accelerated" auction process occurred after the first 70 names were presented for bidding. This process saw franchises nominate 15-20 players, including unsold players, who would go under the hammer.

Players were categorised into two groups, capped and uncapped. Each capped player will be able to register themselves under base prices ranging from $10,000 to $50,000 in $10,000 increments. Uncapped players will be classed with a base price of $20,000 - those having played a minimum of 50 first-class matches; $10,000 - a minimum of 25 first-class matches, or a minimum of 18 matches in the LPL or any other equivalent T20 franchise league; and $5000 - those who do not meet any of the criteria mentioned above.

Matheesha Pathirana became the auction's most expensive player to be picked when Colombo Strikers bought him for a record price of $120,000. Afghanistan Karim Janat became the auction's most expensive overseas player to be picked at $80,000 and it raised eyebrows given Karim Janat is yet to establish and prove himself at international level.

Among the fresh overseas signings, Afghanistan allrounder Karim Janat attracted the biggest bid, going for $80,000 to Dambulla Thunders, a franchise under new ownership this year. Rilee Rossouw was another headliner, joining Kings for $60,000.

== Squads ==
Colombo Strikers	Dambulla Sixers	Galle Marvels	Jaffna Kings	Kandy Falcons
Captains
Thisara Perera	Mohammad Nabi	Niroshan Dickwella (wk)	Charith Asalanka	Wanindu Hasaranga
Players
Chamika Karunaratne; Sadeera Samarawickrama (wk); Nipun Dhananjaya; Shadab Khan; Glenn Phillips; Chamika Gunasekara; Dunith Wellalage; Rahmanullah Gurbaz (wk); Angelo Perera; Shevon Daniel; Garuka Sanketh; Binura Fernando; Matheesha Pathirana; Shehan Fernando; Kaveen Bandara; Isitha Wijesundera; Muhammed Waseem; Allah Mohammad Ghazanfar; Taskin Ahmed	Kusal Perera (wk); Nuwan Thushara; Dilshan Madushanka; Dushan Hemantha; Praveen Jayawickrama; Mustafizur Rahman; Ibrahim Zadran; Lahiru Udara (wk); Akila Dananjaya; Danushka Gunathilaka; Nuwanidu Fernando; Nuwan Pradeep; Ranesh Silva (wk); Lahiru Madushanka; Sonal Dinusha; Mark Chapman; Towhid Hridoy; Reeza Hendricks; Asanka Manoj; Nimesh Vimukthi; Chamindu Wickramasinghe; Sachitha Jayathilake	Maheesh Theekshana; Bhanuka Rajapaksa; Lasith Croospulle; Alex Hales; Tim Seifert (wk); Janith Liyanage; Dwaine Pretorius; Sahan Arachchige; Lahiru Kumara; Prabath Jayasuriya; Sean Williams; Zahoor Khan; Malsha Tharupathi; Isuru Udana; Dhananjaya Lakshan; Pasindu Sooriyabandara; Sadisha Rajapaksa; Mohamed Shiraz; Kavindu Nadeeshan; Mujeeb Ur Rahman; Chamindu Wijesinghe; Jeffrey Vandersay; Yuri Koththigoda	Kusal Mendis (wk); Avishka Fernando; Vijayakanth Viyaskanth; Azmatullah Omarzai; Tabraiz Shamsi; Rilee Rossouw; Fabian Allen; Dhananjaya de Silva; Pramod Madushan; Jason Behrendorff; Asitha Fernando; Vishad Randika (wk); Lahiru Samarakoon; Wanuja Sahan; Eshan Malinga; Alex Ross; Ahan Wickramasinghe; Murvin Abinash; Arul Pragasam; Nishan Madushka (wk); Theesan Vithushan; Nisala Tharaka; Pathum Nissanka	Angelo Mathews; Dushmantha Chameera; Kamindu Mendis; Andre Fletcher (wk); Ashen Bandara; Dinesh Chandimal (wk); Dasun Shanaka; Ramesh Mendis; Salman Ali Agha; Dimuth Karunaratne; Mohammad Hasnain; Chamath Gomez; Pavan Rathnayake; Chaturanga de Silva; Kavindu Pathirathne; Lakshan Sandakan; Sammu Ashan; Mohammad Ali; Kasun Rajitha; Mohammad Haris (wk); Shoriful Islam
Head coaches
Carl Crowe	Rangana Herath	Graham Ford	Avishka Gunawardene	Piyal Wijetunge
Source: ESPNcricinfo

== Venues ==
R. Premadasa Stadium in Colombo, Rangiri Dambulla International Stadium in Dambulla and Pallekele International Cricket Stadium in Kandy were selected as the venues.

City	Colombo	Dambulla	Kandy
Ground	R. Premadasa Stadium	Rangiri Dambulla International Stadium	Pallekele International Cricket Stadium
Capacity	35,000	16,800	35,000
Matches	10	8	6
2024 Lanka Premier League is located in Sri Lanka

== Standings ==
=== Points table ===
The top four teams qualified for the play-offs

Pos	Team	Pld	W	L	Pts	NRR	Qualification
1	Galle Marvels (R)	8	5	3	10	−0.059	Advanced to Qualifier 1
2	Jaffna Kings (C)	8	5	3	10	−0.392	Advanced to Qualifier 1
3	Colombo Strikers (4th)	8	4	4	8	0.583	Advanced to Eliminator
4	Kandy Falcons (3rd)	8	3	5	6	0.033	Advanced to Eliminator
5	Dambulla Sixers	8	3	5	6	−0.269	

Source: ESPNCricinfo

== League stage ==
In April 2024, the Sri Lanka Cricket (SLC) confirmed the fixtures for the competition.

Match 1
1 July 2024
19:30 (N)
Scorecard

Dambulla Sixers; 179/4 (20 overs)	v	Kandy Falcons; 183/4 (17.2 overs)
Mark Chapman 91* (61); Dasun Shanaka 3/20 (4 overs)		Dinesh Chandimal 65 (40); Akila Dananjaya 1/29 (4 overs)

Kandy Falcons won by 6 wickets
Pallekele International Cricket Stadium, Pallekele
Umpires: Prageeth Rambukwella (SL) and Raveendra Wimalasiri (SL)
Player of the match: Dasun Shanaka (Kandy Falcons)

- Kandy Falcons won the toss and elected to field.

Match 2
2 July 2024
15:00 (D/N)
Scorecard

Jaffna Kings; 177/7 (20 overs)	v	Galle Marvels; 179/5 (20 overs)
Avishka Fernando 59 (48); Zahoor Khan 3/34 (4 overs)		Alex Hales 65 (47); Fabian Allen 2/33 (4 overs)

Galle Marvels won by 5 wickets
Pallekele International Cricket Stadium, Pallekele
Umpires: Ruchira Palliyaguruge (SL) and Chamara de Soysa (SL)
Player of the match: Alex Hales (Galle Marvels)

- Jaffna Kings won the toss and elected to bat.

Match 3
2 July 2024
19:30 (N)
Scorecard

Colombo Strikers; 198/7 (20 overs)	v	Kandy Falcons; 147 (15.5 overs)
Sadeera Samarawickrama 48 (26); Wanindu Hasaranga 2/30 (4 overs)		Dinesh Chandimal 38 (26); Dunith Wellalage 4/20 (3.5 overs)

Colombo Strikers won by 51 runs
Pallekele International Cricket Stadium, Pallekele
Umpires: Roland Black (Ire) and Shantha Fonseka (SL)
Player of the match: Shadab Khan (Colombo Strikers)

- Kandy Falcons won the toss and elected to field.
- Shadab Khan became the first bowler from the Colombo Strikers to take a hat-trick.

Match 4
3 July 2024
15:00 (D/N)
Scorecard

Dambulla Sixers; 191/2 (20 overs)	v	Jaffna Kings; 197/6 (20 overs)
Kusal Perera 102* (52); Dhananjaya de Silva 2/25 (4 overs)		Avishka Fernando 80 (34); Mustafizur Rahman 2/30 (4 overs)

Jaffna Kings won by 4 wickets
Pallekele International Cricket Stadium, Pallekele
Umpires: Ravindra Kottahachchi (SL) and Ruchira Palliyaguruge (SL)
Player of the match: Avishka Fernando (Jaffna Kings)

- Jaffna Kings won the toss and elected to field.
- Kusal Perera (Dambulla Sixers) scored his first century in T20s.

Match 5
3 July 2024
19:30 (N)
Scorecard

Galle Marvels; 179 (20 overs)	v	Colombo Strikers; 172/9 (20 overs)
Isuru Udana 52 (34); Shadab Khan 4/21 (4 overs)		Dunith Wellalage 45 (26); Maheesh Theekshana 2/20 (4 overs)

Galle Marvels won by 7 runs
Pallekele International Cricket Stadium, Pallekele
Umpires: Roland Black (Ire) and Sanjeewa Fernando (SL)
Player of the match: Isuru Udana (Galle Marvels)

- Colombo Strikers won the toss and elected to field.

Match 6
5 July 2024
19:30 (N)
Scorecard

Galle Marvels; 187/5 (20 overs)	v	Jaffna Kings; 191/5 (19.4 overs)
Tim Seifert 104* (63); Azmatullah Omarzai 2/33 (4 overs)		Rilee Rossouw 67 (42); Zahoor Khan 2/33 (4 overs)

Jaffna Kings won by 5 wickets
Rangiri Dambulla International Stadium, Dambulla
Umpires: Roland Black (Ire) and Chamara de Soysa (SL)
Player of the match: Azmatullah Omarzai (Jaffna Kings)

- Jaffna Kings won the toss and elected to field.

Match 7
6 July 2024
15:00 (D/N)
Scorecard

Colombo Strikers; 199/9 (20 overs)	v	Kandy Falcons; 197/8 (20 overs)
Glenn Phillips 70 (43); Dushmantha Chameera 3/40 (4 overs)		Mohammad Haris 56 (32); Matheesha Pathirana 4/26 (4 overs)

Colombo Strikers won by 2 runs
Rangiri Dambulla International Stadium, Dambulla
Umpires: Raveendra Wimalasiri (SL) and Shantha Fonseka (SL)
Player of the match: Matheesha Pathirana (Colombo Strikers)

- Kandy Falcons won the toss and elected to field.

Match 8
6 July 2024
19:30 (N)
Scorecard

Jaffna Kings; 218/5 (20 overs)	v	Dambulla Sixers; 188/8 (20 overs)
Pathum Nissanka 88 (53); Mustafizur Rahman 2/39 (4 overs)		Reeza Hendricks 80 (50); Asitha Fernando 2/25 (4 overs)

Jaffna Kings won by 30 runs
Rangiri Dambulla International Stadium, Dambulla
Umpires: Roland Black (Ire) and Sanjeewa Fernando (SL)
Player of the match: Pathum Nissanka (Jaffna Kings)

- Dambulla Sixers won the toss and elected to field.

Match 9
7 July 2024
15:00 (D/N)
Scorecard

Kandy Falcons; 175/7 (20 overs)	v	Galle Marvels; 176/4 (17.1 overs)
Wanindu Hasaranga 65* (32); Isuru Udana 3/30 (4 overs)		Tim Seifert 82* (48); Shoriful Islam 2/32 (4 overs)

Galle Marvels won by 6 wickets
Rangiri Dambulla International Stadium, Dambulla
Umpires: Roland Black (Ire) and Shantha Fonseka (SL)
Player of the match: Isuru Udana (Galle Marvels)

- Galle Marvels won the toss and elected to field.

Match 10
7 July 2024
19:30 (N)
Scorecard

Colombo Strikers; 185/6 (20 overs)	v	Dambulla Sixers; 188/2 (17.5 overs)
Glenn Phillips 52 (36); Mohammad Nabi 2/20 (4 overs)		Kusal Perera 80 (50); Taskin Ahmed 2/45 (4 overs)

Dambulla Sixers won by 8 wickets
Rangiri Dambulla International Stadium, Dambulla
Umpires: Sanjeewa Fernando (SL) and Ruchira Palliyaguruge (SL)
Player of the match: Kusal Perera (Dambulla Sixers)

- Dambulla Sixers won the toss and elected to field.

Match 11
9 July 2024
15:00 (D/N)
Scorecard

Jaffna Kings; 224/7 (20 overs)	v	Kandy Falcons; 230/3 (18.2 overs)
Pathum Nissanka 119 (59); Dasun Shanaka 3/40 (4 overs)		Dinesh Chandimal 89 (37); Tabraiz Shamsi 2/46 (4 overs)

Kandy Falcons won by 7 wickets
Rangiri Dambulla International Stadium, Dambulla
Umpires: Chamara de Soysa (SL) and Sanjeewa Fernando (SL)
Player of the match: Dinesh Chandimal (Kandy Falcons)

- Kandy Falcons won the toss and elected to field.
- Pathum Nissanka (Jaffna Kings) scored his first century in T20s.

Match 12
9 July 2024
19:30 (N)
Scorecard

Dambulla Sixers; 160/8 (20 overs)	v	Galle Marvels; 135 (19.4 overs)
Chamindu Wickramasinghe 56* (34); Kavindu Nadeeshan 3/16 (4 overs)		Isuru Udana 72 (38); Dushan Hemantha 3/33 (4 overs)

Dambulla Sixers won by 25 runs
Rangiri Dambulla International Stadium, Dambulla
Umpires: Raveendra Wimalasiri (SL) and Shantha Fonseka (SL)
Player of the match: Chamindu Wickramasinghe (Dambulla Sixers)

- Galle Marvels won the toss and elected to field.

Match 13
10 July 2024
15:00 (D/N)
Scorecard

Colombo Strikers; 188/8 (20 overs)	v	Jaffna Kings; 190/3 (18.3 overs)
Glenn Phillips 58 (32); Azmatullah Omarzai 2/31 (4 overs)		Rilee Rossouw 108* (50); Shadab Khan 1/15 (2 overs)

Jaffna Kings won by 7 wickets
Rangiri Dambulla International Stadium, Dambulla
Umpires: Chamara de Soysa (SL) and Ravindra Kottahachchi (SL)
Player of the match: Rilee Rossouw (Jaffna Kings)

- Jaffna Kings won the toss and elected to field.

Match 14
10 July 2024
19:30 (N)
Scorecard

Kandy Falcons; 187/9 (20 overs)	v	Galle Marvels; 188/2 (19.2 overs)
Andre Fletcher 69 (43); Prabath Jayasuriya 3/30 (4 overs)		Alex Hales 86* (55); Andre Fletcher 1/11 (2 overs)

Galle Marvels won by 8 wickets
Rangiri Dambulla International Stadium, Dambulla
Umpires: Sanjeewa Fernando (SL) and Ravindra Kottahachchi (SL)
Player of the match: Prabath Jayasuriya (Galle Marvels)

- Galle Marvels won the toss and elected to field.

Match 15
13 July 2024
19:30 (N)
Scorecard

Kandy Falcons; 78/5 (7 overs)	v	Jaffna Kings; 79/6 (5.5 overs)
Mohammad Haris 30 (13); Jason Behrendorff 3/10 (2 overs)		Charith Asalanka 26 (9); Wanindu Hasaranga 2/18 (1 over)

Jaffna Kings won by 4 wickets
R. Premadasa Stadium, Colombo
Umpires: Chamara de Soysa (SL) and Raveendra Wimalasiri (SL)
Player of the match: Jason Behrendorff (Jaffna Kings)

- Jaffna Kings won the toss and elected to field.
- The match was reduced to 7 overs per side due to rain.

Match 16
14 July 2024
15:00 (D/N)
Scorecard

Galle Marvels; 148/9 (20 overs)	v	Dambulla Sixers; 148/7 (20 overs)
Alex Hales 38 (26); Mohammad Nabi 2/14 (4 overs)		Reeza Hendricks 72 (57); Maheesh Theekshana 3/26 (4 overs)

Match tied (Galle Marvels won the Super Over)
R. Premadasa Stadium, Colombo
Umpires: Faisal Afridi (Pak) and Ravindra Kottahachchi (SL)
Player of the match: Maheesh Theekshana (Galle Marvels)

- Dambulla Sixers won the toss and elected to field.
- Super over: Dambulla Sixers 6/2, Galle Marvels 12/0

Match 17
14 July 2024
19:30 (N)
Scorecard

Jaffna Kings; 109/9 (20 overs)	v	Colombo Strikers; 112/1 (9.5 overs)
Vijayakanth Viyaskanth 25 (34); Shadab Khan 4/10 (4 overs)		Rahmanullah Gurbaz 57* (33); Pramod Madushan 1/26 (2 overs)

Colombo Strikers won by 9 wickets
R. Premadasa Stadium, Colombo
Umpires: Chamara de Soysa (SL) and Shantha Fonseka (SL)
Player of the match: Shadab Khan (Colombo Strikers)

- Colombo Strikers won the toss and elected to field.

Match 18
15 July 2024
15:00 (D/N)
Scorecard

Kandy Falcons; 222/4 (20 overs)	v	Dambulla Sixers; 168/9 (20 overs)
Andre Fletcher 60 (34); Dushan Hemantha 3/14 (4 overs)		Kusal Perera 74 (40); Wanindu Hasaranga 4/35 (4 overs)

Kandy Falcons won by 54 runs
R. Premadasa Stadium, Colombo
Umpires: Kumar Dharmasena (SL) and Chamara de Soysa (SL)
Player of the match: Wanindu Hasaranga (Kandy Falcons)

- Dambulla Sixers won the toss and elected to field.

Match 19
15 July 2024
19:30 (N)
Scorecard

Galle Marvels; 138 (19.5 overs)	v	Colombo Strikers; 142/3 (18.2 overs)
Tim Seifert 44 (38); Matheesha Pathirana 4/20 (3.5 overs)		Muhammad Waseem 50 (44); Sahan Arachchige 1/9 (1.2 overs)

Colombo Strikers won by 7 wickets
R. Premadasa Stadium, Colombo
Umpires: Faisal Afridi (Pak) and Ravindra Kottahachchi (SL)
Player of the match: Matheesha Pathirana (Colombo Strikers)

- Colombo Strikers won the toss and elected to field.

Match 20
16 July 2024
19:30 (N)
Scorecard

Dambulla Sixers; 123 (20 overs)	v	Colombo Strikers; 95 (18.1 overs)
Mohammad Nabi 40 (33); Binura Fernando 3/15 (4 overs)		Thisara Perera 30 (31); Nuwan Pradeep 3/20 (2.1 overs)

Dambulla Sixers won by 28 runs
R. Premadasa Stadium, Colombo
Umpires: Faisal Afridi (Pak) and Kumar Dharmasena (SL)
Player of the match: Mohammad Nabi (Dambulla Sixers)

- Colombo Strikers won the toss and elected to field.

== Play-offs ==
Qualifier 1
18 July 2024 — Colombo
1	Galle Marvels	181/3 (18.1 overs)
2	Jaffna Kings	177/7 (20 overs)
Eliminator
18 July 2024 — Colombo
3	Colombo Strikers	159/8 (20 overs)
4	Kandy Falcons	163/8 (19.4 overs)

Qualifier 2
20 July 2024 — Colombo
Q1L	Jaffna Kings	187/7 (20 overs)
EW	Kandy Falcons	186/8 (20 overs)

Final
21 July 2024 — Colombo
Q1W	Galle Marvels	184/6 (20 overs)
Q2W	Jaffna Kings	185/1 (15.4 overs)

=== Qualifier 1 ===
Match 21
18 July 2024
15:00 (D/N)
Scorecard

Jaffna Kings; 177/7 (20 overs)	v	Galle Marvels; 181/3 (18.1 overs)
Avishka Fernando 52 (33); Dwaine Pretorius 4/23 (4 overs)		Tim Seifert 62* (41); Tabraiz Shamsi 1/27 (3.1 overs)

Galle Marvels won by 7 wickets
R. Premadasa Stadium, Colombo
Umpires: Faisal Afridi (Pak) and Ravindra Kottahachchi (SL)
Player of the match: Dwaine Pretorius (Galle Marvels)

- Galle Marvels won the toss and elected to field.

=== Eliminator ===
Match 22
18 July 2024
19:30 (N)
Scorecard

Colombo Strikers; 159/8 (20 overs)	v	Kandy Falcons; 163/8 (18.4 overs)
Sadeera Samarawickrama 62 (45); Mohammad Hasnain 3/24 (3 overs)		Kamindu Mendis 54 (36); Binura Fernando 3/35 (4 overs)

Kandy Falcons won by 2 wickets
R. Premadasa Stadium, Colombo
Umpires: Kumar Dharmasena (SL) and Shantha Fonseka (SL)
Player of the match: Kamindu Mendis (Kandy Falcons)

- Kandy Falcons won the toss and elected to field.
- Rahmanullah Gurbaz completed 1,000 runs in LPL.

=== Qualifier 2 ===
Match 23
20 July 2024
19:30 (N)
Scorecard

Jaffna Kings; 187/7 (20 overs)	v	Kandy Falcons; 186/8 (20 overs)
Kusal Mendis 105* (54); Ramesh Mendis 2/10 (2 overs)		Andre Fletcher 38 (21); Fabian Allen 4/24 (4 overs)

Jaffna Kings won by 1 run
R. Premadasa Stadium, Colombo
Umpires: Faisal Afridi (Pak) and Kumar Dharmasena (SL)
Player of the match: Kusal Mendis (Jaffna Kings)

- Kandy Falcons won the toss and elected to field.

=== Final ===
Match 24
21 July 2024
19:30 (N)
Scorecard

Galle Marvels; 184/6 (20 overs)	v	Jaffna Kings; 185/1 (15.4 overs)
Bhanuka Rajapaksa 82 (34); Asitha Fernando 3/35 (4 overs)		Rilee Rossouw 106* (53); Dwaine Pretorius 1/18 (2.4 overs)

Jaffna Kings won by 9 wickets
R. Premadasa Stadium, Colombo
Umpires: Kumar Dharmasena (SL) and Raveendra Wimalasiri (SL)
Player of the match: Rilee Rossouw (Jaffna Kings)

- Jaffna Kings won the toss and elected to field.

== Statistics ==
Most runs
Runs	Player	Team
400	Tim Seifert	Galle Marvels
389	Rilee Rossouw	Jaffna Kings
374	Avishka Fernando	Jaffna Kings
333	Pathum Nissanka	Jaffna Kings
329	Kusal Mendis	Jaffna Kings

- Source: ESPNCricinfo

Most wickets
Wickets	Player	Team
17	Shadab Khan	Colombo Strikers
15	Matheesha Pathirana	Colombo Strikers
15	Wanindu Hasaranga	Kandy Falcons
14	Isuru Udana	Galle Marvels
13	Binura Fernando	Colombo Strikers

- Source: ESPNCricinfo

=== Most valuable player (MVP) ===
Total Impact Points	Player	Team
566.8	Wanindu Hasaranga	Kandy Falcons
505.8	Dasun Shanaka	Kandy Falcons
477.2	Isuru Udana	Galle Marvels
463.5	Shadab Khan	Colombo Strikers
442.2	Rilee Rossouw	Jaffna Kings

- Source: ESPNCricinfo

== See also ==
- Colombo Strikers in 2024
- Dambulla Sixers in 2024
- Galle Marvels in 2024
- Jaffna Kings in 2024
- Kandy Falcons in 2024
