= 2024 Colombo Strikers season =

2024 season of Colombo Strikers in the Lanka Premier League

Colombo Strikers
2024 season
- Coach: Carl Crowe
- Captain: Thisara Perera

The Colombo Strikers (abbreviated as CS) is a franchise cricket team which competes in 2024 Lanka Premier League. The team is based in Colombo, Western Province, Sri Lanka. The team was captained by Thisara Perera and coached by Carl Crowe.

== Squad ==
- Sources: ESPNcricinfo, ThePapare.com
- Players with international caps are listed in **bold**
- Ages of the first match of the season

No.	Name	Nat.	Birth date	Batting style	Bowling style	Year signed	Salary (US$)	Notes
Batters
	Kavin Bandara	Sri Lanka	22 August 1997 (aged 26)	Left handed	Right-arm medium-fast	2024	5,000	
11	Shevon Daniel	Sri Lanka	15 March 2004 (aged 20)	Left handed	Right-arm off break	2024	10,000	
	Nipun Dhananjaya	Sri Lanka	28 September 2000 (aged 23)	Left handed	Right-arm off break	2023	Retained	
	Shehan Fernando	Sri Lanka	6 September 2000 (aged 23)	left handed	Right-arm off break	2024	5,000	
10	**Muhammad Waseem**	United Arab Emirates	12 February 1994 (aged 30)	Right handed	Right-arm medium	2024	20,000	Overseas
Wicket-keepers
21	**Rahmanullah Gurbaz**	Afghanistan	28 November 2001 (aged 22)	Right handed	—N/a	2024	50,000	Overseas
23	**Sadeera Samarawickrama**	Sri Lanka	30 August 1995 (aged 28)	Right handed	—N/a	2024	Direct signing	
All-rounders
7	**Shadab Khan**	Pakistan	4 October 1998 (aged 25)	Right handed	Right-arm leg break	2024	Direct signing	Overseas
29	**Chamika Karunaratne**	Sri Lanka	29 May 1996 (aged 28)	Right handed	Right-arm medium-fast	2023	Retained	
74	**Angelo Perera**	Sri Lanka	23 February 1990 (aged 34)	Right handed	Slow left-arm orthodox	2024	20,000	
1	**Thisara Perera**	Sri Lanka	3 April 1989 (aged 35)	Left handed	Right-arm medium-fast	2024	Direct signing	Captain
23	**Glenn Phillips**	New Zealand	6 December 1996 (aged 27)	Right handed	Right-arm off break	2024	Direct signing	Overseas
1	**Dunith Wellalage**	Sri Lanka	9 January 2003 (aged 21)	Left handed	Slow left-arm orthodox	2024	50,000	
Spin bowlers
4	**Allah Mohammad Ghazanfar**	Afghanistan	15 July 2007 (aged 16)	Right handed	Right-arm off break	2024	10,000	Overseas
Pace bowlers
3	**Taskin Ahmed**	Bangladesh	3 April 1995 (aged 29)	Left handed	Right-arm fast	2024	50,000	Overseas
71	**Binura Fernando**	Sri Lanka	12 July 1995 (aged 28)	Right handed	Left-arm medium-fast	2024	55,000	
	**Chamika Gunasekara**	Sri Lanka	25 November 1999 (aged 24)	Right handed	Right-arm medium-fast	2024	10,000	
81	**Matheesha Pathirana**	Sri Lanka	18 December 2002 (aged 21)	Right handed	Right-arm fast	2024	120,000	
	Garuka Sanketh	Sri Lanka	30 May 2005 (aged 19)	Left handed	Right-arm medium	2024	13,000	
	Isitha Wijesundera	Sri Lanka	11 May 1997 (aged 27)	Left handed	Right-arm medium-fast	2024	5,000	

== Administration and support staff ==
Position	Name
Head Coach	Carl Crowe
Bowling Coach	Chaminda Vaas
Assistant Coach	Simon Helmot

== Season standing ==
=== League table ===
Pos	Team	Pld	W	L	Pts	NRR	Qualification
1	Galle Marvels (R)	8	5	3	10	−0.059	Advanced to Qualifier 1
2	Jaffna Kings (C)	8	5	3	10	−0.392	Advanced to Qualifier 1
3	Colombo Strikers (4th)	8	4	4	8	0.583	Advanced to Eliminator
4	Kandy Falcons (3rd)	8	3	5	6	0.033	Advanced to Eliminator
5	Dambulla Sixers	8	3	5	6	−0.269	

Source: ESPNCricinfo

=== Matches ===
denotes the winning team. denotes the losing team.
Date	Match No.	Opponent	Toss	Result	Man of the match	Notes
Group Stage
2 July	3	Kandy Falcons	Falcons elected to field.	Strikers won by 51 runs	Shadab Khan (CS)	(Note: Shadab Khan became the first bowler from the Colombo Strikers to take a hat-trick.)
3 July	5	Galle Marvels	Strikers elected to bowl.	Marvels won by 7 runs	Isuru Udana (GM)	
6 July	7	Kandy Falcons	Falcons elected to field.	Strikers won by 2 runs	Matheesha Pathirana (CS)	
7 July	10	Dambulla Sixers	Sixers elected to field.	Sixers won by 8 wickets	Kusal Perera (DS)	
10 July	13	Jaffna Kings	Kings elected to field.	Kings won by 7 wickets	Rilee Rossouw (JK)	
14 July	17	Jaffna Kings	Strikers elected to field.	Strikers won by 9 wickets	Shadab Khan (CS)	
15 July	19	Galle Marvels	Strikers elected to field.	Strikers won by 7 wickets	Matheesha Pathirana (CS)	
16 July	20	Dambulla Sixers	Strikers elected to field.	Sixers won by 28 runs	Mohammad Nabi (DS)	
Play-offs
18 July	22 (E)	Kandy Falcons	Falcons elected to field.	Falcons won by 2 wickets	Kamindu Mendis (KF)	
