= 2024 Kandy Falcons season =

2024 season of Kandy Falcons in the Lanka Premier League

Kandy Falcons
2024 season
- Logo of Kandy Falcons for 2024 season
- Coach: Mushtaq Ahmed
- Captain: Wanindu Hasaranga
- Tournament performance: Playoffs (3rd)
- Most runs: Andre Fletcher (321)
- Most wickets: Wanindu Hasaranga (15)

The Kandy Falcons (abbreviated as KAF) is a franchise cricket team that competed in 2024 Lanka Premier League. The team is based in Kandy, Central Province Sri Lanka. The team was captained by Wanindu Hasaranga and coached by Mushtaq Ahmed.

Sri Lanka Cricket severed the contract with B-Love Kandy in May 2024 citing breaches of contractual obligations. Management of the team passed on to the tournament organisers, the IPG Group. The franchisee B-Love Network is a Dubai-based cryptocurrency business.

== Squad ==
- Sources: ESPNcricinfo, ThePapare.com
- Players with international caps are listed in **bold**
- Ages as of the first match of the season

| No. | Name | Nationality | Date of birth (age) | Batting style | Bowling style | Year signed | Salary (US$) | Notes |
Batters
| | Shammu Ashan | Sri Lanka | 9 January 1998 (aged 26) | Right handed | Right-arm off break | 2024 | 5,000 | |
| | **Ashen Bandara** | Sri Lanka | 23 November 1998 (aged 25) | Right handed | Right-arm leg break | 2024 | 28,000 | |
| 72 | **Andre Fletcher** | West Indies | 28 November 1987 (aged 36) | Right handed | Right-arm medium-fast | 2024 | Direct signing | Overseas |
| 16 | **Dimuth Karunaratne** | Sri Lanka | 21 April 1988 (aged 36) | Right handed | Right-arm medium | 2024 | 10,000 | |
| | Pavan Rathnayake | Sri Lanka | 24 August 2002 (aged 21) | Right handed | Right-arm off break | 2024 | 5,000 | |
Wicket-keepers
| 56 | **Dinesh Chandimal** | Sri Lanka | 18 November 1989 (aged 34) | Right handed | Right-arm off break | 2024 | 40,000 | |
| 29 | **Mohammad Haris** | Pakistan | 30 March 2001 (aged 23) | Right handed | Right-arm off break | 2024 | Direct signing | Overseas |
| 23 | **Azam Khan** | Pakistan | 10 August 1998 (aged 25) | Right handed | – | 2024 | 50,000 | Overseas |
All-rounders
| 67 | **Salman Ali Agha** | Pakistan | 23 November 1993 (aged 30) | Right handed | Right-arm off break | 2024 | 10,000 | Overseas |
| 49 | **Wanindu Hasaranga** | Sri Lanka | 29 July 1997 (aged 26) | Right handed | Right-arm leg break | 2023 | Retained | Local Icon Player; Captain |
| 69 | **Angelo Mathews** | Sri Lanka | 2 June 1987 (aged 37) | Right handed | Right-arm medium | 2023 | Retained | Local Platinum Player |
| 21 | **Kamindu Mendis** | Sri Lanka | 30 September 1998 (aged 25) | Left handed | Slow left-arm orthodox, Right-arm off break | 2023 | Retained | |
| 25 | **Ramesh Mendis** | Sri Lanka | 7 July 1995 (aged 28) | Right handed | Right-arm off break | 2024 | 10,000 | |
| 7 | **Dasun Shanaka** | Sri Lanka | 9 September 1991 (aged 32) | Right handed | Right-arm medium | 2024 | 84,000 | |
| | **Chaturanga de Silva** | Sri Lanka | 17 January 1990 (aged 34) | Left handed | Slow left-arm orthodox | 2024 | 30,000 | |
Spin bowlers
| 85 | **Lakshan Sandakan** | Sri Lanka | 10 June 1991 (aged 33) | Right handed | Left-arm wrist spin | 2024 | 20,000 | |
Pace bowlers
| | **Mohammad Ali** | Pakistan | 1 November 1992 (aged 31) | Right handed | Right-arm medium-fast | 2024 | 10,000 | Overseas |
| 5 | **Dushmantha Chameera** | Sri Lanka | 11 January 1992 (aged 32) | Right handed | Right-arm fast | 2023 | Retained | |
| 71 | Chamath Gomez | Sri Lanka | 1 July 2004 (aged 20) | Right handed | Right-arm medium | 2024 | 5,000 | |
| 87 | **Mohammad Hasnain** | Pakistan | 5 April 2000 (aged 24) | Right handed | Right-arm fast | 2023 | 30,000 | Overseas |
| 47 | **Shoriful Islam** | Bangladesh | 3 June 2001 (aged 23) | Left handed | Left-arm medium-fast | 2024 | 30,000 | Overseas |
| | Kavindu Pathiratne | Sri Lanka | 9 August 2002 (aged 21) | Left handed | Right-arm medium-fast | 2024 | 5,000 | |
| 65 | **Kasun Rajitha** | Sri Lanka | 1 June 1993 (aged 31) | Right handed | Right-arm medium-fast | 2024 | 26,000 | |

== Season standing ==
=== League table ===
| Pos | Team | Pld | W | L | Pts | NRR | Qualification |
|---|---|---|---|---|---|---|---|
| 1 | Galle Marvels (R) | 8 | 5 | 3 | 10 | −0.059 | Advanced to Qualifier 1 |
| 2 | Jaffna Kings (C) | 8 | 5 | 3 | 10 | −0.392 | Advanced to Qualifier 1 |
| 3 | Colombo Strikers (4th) | 8 | 4 | 4 | 8 | 0.583 | Advanced to Eliminator |
| 4 | Kandy Falcons (3rd) | 8 | 3 | 5 | 6 | 0.033 | Advanced to Eliminator |
| 5 | Dambulla Sixers | 8 | 3 | 5 | 6 | −0.269 | |

Source: ESPNCricinfo

=== Matches ===
denotes the winning team. denotes the losing team.
| Date | Match No. | Opponent | Toss | Result | Man of the match | Notes |
Group stage
| 1 July | 1 | Dambulla Sixers | Falcons elected to field. | Falcons won by 6 wickets | Dasun Shanaka (KF) | |
| 2 July | 3 | Colombo Strikers | Falcons elected to field. | Strikers won by 51 runs | Shadab Khan (CS) | (Note: Shadab Khan became the first bowler from the Colombo Strikers to take a hat-trick.) |
| 6 July | 7 | Colombo Strikers | Falcons elected to field. | Strikers won by 2 runs | Matheesha Pathirana (CS) | |
| 7 July | 9 | Galle Marvels | Marvels elected to field. | Marvels won by 6 wickets | Isuru Udana (GM) | |
| 9 July | 11 | Jaffna Kings | Falcons elected to field. | Falcons won by 7 wickets | Dinesh Chandimal (KF) | (Note: Pathum Nissanka (Jaffna Kings) scored his first century in T20s.) |
| 10 July | 14 | Galle Marvels | Marvels elected to field. | Marvels won by 8 wickets | Prabath Jayasuriya (GM) | |
| 13 July | 15 | Jaffna Kings | Kings elected to field. | Kings won by 4 wickets | Jason Behrendorff (JK) | (Note: The match was reduced to 7 overs per side due to rain.) |
| 15 July | 18 | Dambulla Sixers | Sixers elected to field. | Falcons won by 54 runs | Wanindu Hasaranga (KF) | |
Play-offs
| 18 July | 22 (E) | Colombo Strikers | Falcons elected to field. | Falcons won by 2 wickets | Kamindu Mendis (KF) | |
| 20 July | 23 (Q2) | Jaffna Kings | Falcons elected to field. | Kings won by 1 run | Kusal Mendis (JK) | |
