= 2024 Jaffna Kings season =

2024 season of Jaffna Kings in the Lanka Premier League

Jaffna Kings
2024 season
- Coach: Avishka Gunawardene
- Captain: Charith Asalanka
- Tournament performance: Champions
- Most runs: Rilee Rossouw (389)
- Most wickets: Fabian Allen (10)

The Jaffna Kings (often abbreviated as JK) is a franchise cricket team that competed in 2024 Lanka Premier League (LPL). The team is based in Jaffna, Northern Province, Sri Lanka. The team was captained by Charith Asalanka and coached by Avishka Gunawardene.

== Administration and support staff ==
Position	Name
Director	Ganeshan Vaheesan
Manager	Charinda Fernando
Head coach	Avishka Gunawardene
Assistant coach	Mario Villavarayan
Consultant	Hemang Badani
Batting coach	Jehan Mubarak
Bowling coach	Sachith Pathirana
Fielding coach	Vimukthi Deshapriya

== Squad ==
- Sources: ESPNcricinfo, ThePapare.com
- Players with international caps are listed in **bold**.

No.	Name	Nationality	Date of birth (age)	Batting style	Bowling style	Year signed	Salary (US$)	Notes
**Batters**
28	**Avishka Fernando**	Sri Lanka	5 April 1998 (age 28)	Right-handed	Right-arm medium-fast	2024	Direct signing	
18	**Pathum Nissanka**	Sri Lanka	18 May 1998 (age 28)	Right-handed	—N/a	2024	40,000	
49	Alex Ross	Australia	17 April 1992 (age 34)	Right-handed	Right-arm off break	2024	20,000	Overseas
32	**Rilee Rossouw**	South Africa	9 October 1989 (age 36)	Left-handed	Right-arm off break	2024	60,000	Overseas
	Ahan Wickramasinghe	Sri Lanka	2 September 2001 (age 25)	Right-handed	—N/a	2024	5,000	
**All-rounders**
97	**Fabian Allen**	West Indies	7 May 1995 (age 31)	Right-handed	Slow left-arm orthodox	2024	32,000	Overseas
72	**Charith Asalanka**	Sri Lanka	29 June 1997 (age 29)	Left-handed	Right-arm off break	2023	Retained	Captain
75	**Dhananjaya de Silva**	Sri Lanka	6 September 1991 (age 35)	Right-handed	Right-arm off break	2024	50,000	
77	**Azmatullah Omarzai**	Afghanistan	24 March 2000 (age 26)	Right-handed	Right-arm medium-fast	2024	Direct signing	Overseas
	Wanuja Sahan	Sri Lanka	17 June 2003 (age 23)	Left-handed	Slow left-arm orthodox	2024	10,000	
	**Lahiru Samarakoon**	Sri Lanka	3 March 1997 (age 29)	Left-handed	Right-arm fast-medium	2024	13,000	
**Wicket-keepers**
24	**Nishan Madushka**	Sri Lanka	10 September 1999 (age 27)	Right-handed	—N/a	2024	10,000	
13	**Kusal Mendis**	Sri Lanka	2 February 1995 (age 31)	Right-handed	Right-arm leg break	2024	Direct signing	
	Vishad Randika	Sri Lanka	2 September 1997 (age 29)	Right-handed	Right-arm off break	2024	5,000	
**Spin bowlers**
	Murvin Abinash	Sri Lanka	18 June 2000 (age 26)	Left-handed	Right-arm off break	2024	5,000	
15	**Tabraiz Shamsi**	South Africa	18 February 1990 (age 36)	Right-handed	Left-arm unorthodox spin	2024	Direct signing	Overseas
	Theesan Vithushan	Sri Lanka	2 May 2001 (age 25)	Right-handed	Slow left-arm orthodox	2024	5,000	
26	**Vijayakanth Viyaskanth**	Sri Lanka	5 December 2001 (age 24)	Right-handed	Right-arm leg break	2023	Retained	
**Pace bowlers**
65	**Jason Behrendorff**	Australia	20 April 1990 (age 36)	Right-handed	Left-arm fast-medium	2024	50,000	Overseas
	**Asitha Fernando**	Sri Lanka	31 July 1997 (age 29)	Right-handed	Right-arm medium-fast	2024	40,000	
40	**Pramod Madushan**	Sri Lanka	14 December 1993 (age 32)	Right-handed	Right-arm medium-fast	2024	20,000	
97	Eshan Malinga	Sri Lanka	4 February 2001 (age 25)	Left-handed	Right-arm fast-medium	2024	13,000	
	Arul Pragasam	Sri Lanka	6 November 2003 (age 22)	Right-handed	Right-arm medium	2024	5,000	
	Nisala Tharaka	Sri Lanka	20 April 1991 (age 35)	Right-handed	Right-arm medium-fast	2024	5,000	

== Season standing ==
=== League table ===
Pos	Team	Pld	W	L	Pts	NRR	Qualification
1	Galle Marvels (R)	8	5	3	10	−0.059	Advanced to Qualifier 1
2	Jaffna Kings (C)	8	5	3	10	−0.392	Advanced to Qualifier 1
3	Colombo Strikers (4th)	8	4	4	8	0.583	Advanced to Eliminator
4	Kandy Falcons (3rd)	8	3	5	6	0.033	Advanced to Eliminator
5	Dambulla Sixers	8	3	5	6	−0.269	

Source: ESPNCricinfo

=== Matches ===
denotes the winning team. denotes the losing team.
Date	Match No.	Opponent	Toss	Result	Man of the match	Notes
Group stage
2 July	2	Galle Marvels	Kings elected to bat.	Marvels won by 5 wickets	Alex Hales (GM)	
3 July	4	Dambulla Sixers	Kings elected to field.	Kings won by 4 wickets	Avishka Fernando (JK)	(Note: Kusal Perera (Dambulla Sixers) scored his first century in T20s.)
5 July	6	Galle Marvels	Kings elected to field.	Kings won by 5 wickets	Azmatullah Omarzai (JK)	
6 July	8	Dambulla Sixers	Sixers elected to field.	Kings won by 30 runs	Pathum Nissanka (JK)	
9 July	11	Kandy Falcons	Falcons elected to field.	Falcons won by 7 wickets	Dinesh Chandimal (KF)	(Note: Pathum Nissanka (Jaffna Kings) scored his first century in T20s.)
10 July	13	Colombo Strikers	Kings elected to field.	Kings won by 7 wickets	Rilee Rossouw (JK)	
13 July	15	Kandy Falcons	Kings elected to field.	Kings won by 4 wickets	Jason Behrendorff (JK)	(Note: The match was reduced to 7 overs per side due to rain.)
14 July	17	Colombo Strikers	Strikers elected to field.	Strikers won by 9 wickets	Shadab Khan (CS)	
Play-offs
18 July	21 (Q1)	Galle Marvels	Marvels elected to field.	Marvels won by 7 wickets	Dwaine Pretorius (GM)	
20 July	23 (Q2)	Kandy Falcons	Falcons elected to field.	Kings won by 1 run	Kusal Mendis (JK)	
21 July	24 (F)	Galle Marvels	Kings elected to field.	Kings won by 9 wickets	Rilee Rossouw (JK)	
