= 2024 Dambulla Sixers season =

2024 season of Dambulla Sixers in the Lanka Premier League

Dambulla Sixers
2024 season
- Logo of Dambulla Sixers for 2024 season
- Coach: Rangana Herath
- Captain: Mohammad Nabi
- Tournament performance: League stage (5th)
- Most runs: Kusal Perera (296)
- Most wickets: Dushan Hemantha (11)

The Dambulla Sixers (DS) is a franchise cricket team that competed in 2024 Lanka Premier League. The team was based in Dambulla, Central Province, Sri Lanka. In May 2024, Dambulla Aura changed their name to Dambulla Sixers after having new owners. In 2024 Dambulla team changed their name to Dambulla Sixers. The team was captained by Mohammad Nabi and coached by Rangana Herath.

== Squad ==
- Sources: ESPNcricinfo, ThePapare.com, Newswire.com
- Players with international caps are listed in **bold**
- Ages of the first match of the season

No.	Name	Nat.	Date of birth	Batting style	Bowling style	Year signed	Salary (US$)	Notes
Batters
80	**Mark Chapman**	New Zealand	27 June 1994 (aged 30)	Left handed	Slow left-arm orthodox	2024	Direct signing	Overseas
	**Nuwanidu Fernando**	Sri Lanka	13 October 1999 (aged 24)	Right handed	Right-arm off break	2024	34,000	
17	**Reeza Hendricks**	South Africa	14 August 1989 (aged 34)	Right handed	Right-arm off break	2024	Direct signing	Overseas
77	**Towhid Hridoy**	Bangladesh	4 December 2000 (aged 23)	Right handed	Right-arm off break	2024	Direct signing	Overseas
18	**Ibrahim Zadran**	Afghanistan	12 December 2001 (aged 22)	Right handed	Right-arm medium-fast	2024	Direct signing	Overseas
Wicket-keepers
55	**Kusal Janith Perera**	Sri Lanka	17 August 1990 (aged 33)	Left handed	—N/a	2024	Direct signing	
	Ranesh Silva	Sri Lanka	24 January 2002 (aged 22)	Right handed	—N/a	2024	5,000	
	**Lahiru Udara**	Sri Lanka	27 November 1993 (aged 30)	Right handed	—N/a	2024	14,000	
All-rounders
4	**Akila Dananjaya**	Sri Lanka	4 October 1993 (aged 30)	Left handed	Right-arm off break, Right-arm leg break	2024	20,000	
	Sonal Dinusha	Sri Lanka	4 December 2000 (aged 23)	Left handed	Slow left-arm orthodox	2024	6,000	
70	**Danushka Gunathilaka**	Sri Lanka	17 March 1991 (aged 33)	Left handed	Right-arm off break	2024	22,000	
34	**Dushan Hemantha**	Sri Lanka	24 May 1994 (aged 30)	Right handed	Right-arm leg break	2023	Retained	
	Sachitha Jayathilake	Sri Lanka	24 February 1997 (aged 27)	Right handed	Right-arm leg break	2024	Direct signing	
	**Lahiru Madushanka**	Sri Lanka	12 September 1992 (aged 31)	Right handed	Right-arm fast-medium	2024	20,000	
7	**Mohammad Nabi**	Afghanistan	1 January 1985 (aged 39)	Right handed	Right-arm off break	2024	Direct signing	Overseas; Captain
	Nimesh Vimukthi	Sri Lanka	7 May 1997 (aged 27)	Left handed	Slow left-arm orthodox	2024	Direct signing	
	Chamindu Wickramasinghe	Sri Lanka	6 September 2002 (aged 21)	Left handed	Right-arm medium	2024	Direct signing	
Spin bowlers
92	**Praveen Jayawickrama**	Sri Lanka	30 September 1998 (aged 25)	Right handed	Slow left-arm orthodox	2023	Retained	
Pace bowlers
98	**Dilshan Madushanka**	Sri Lanka	18 September 2000 (aged 23)	Right handed	Left-arm fast-medium	2024	Direct signing	
	Asanka Manoj	Sri Lanka	23 March 1997 (aged 27)	Right handed	Right-arm fast-medium	2024	Direct signing	
63	**Nuwan Pradeep**	Sri Lanka	19 October 1986 (aged 37)	Right handed	Right-arm fast-medium	2024	36,000	
90	**Mustafizur Rahman**	Bangladesh	6 September 1995 (aged 28)	Left handed	Left-arm fast-medium	2024	Direct signing	Overseas
53	**Nuwan Thushara**	Sri Lanka	6 August 1994 (aged 29)	Right handed	Right-arm medium-fast	2024	Direct signing	

== Administration and support staff ==
Position	Name
Head Coach	Graham Ford
Mentor	Sanath Jayasuriya
Assistant Coach	Chamara Kapugedera
Bowling and Fielding Coach	Anton Roux
Physiotherapist	Dr. Dulan Kodikara
Trainer	Chandula Liyanage
Senior Performance Analyst	AR Srikkanth
Company Manager	Tarun Kumar Gunja

== Season standing ==
=== League table ===
Pos	Team	Pld	W	L	Pts	NRR	Qualification
1	Galle Marvels (R)	8	5	3	10	−0.059	Advanced to Qualifier 1
2	Jaffna Kings (C)	8	5	3	10	−0.392	Advanced to Qualifier 1
3	Colombo Strikers (4th)	8	4	4	8	0.583	Advanced to Eliminator
4	Kandy Falcons (3rd)	8	3	5	6	0.033	Advanced to Eliminator
5	Dambulla Sixers	8	3	5	6	−0.269	

Source: ESPNCricinfo

=== Matches ===
denotes the winning team. denotes the losing team.
Date	Match No.	Opponent	Toss	Result	Man of the match	Notes
Group stage
1 July	1	Kandy Falcons	Falcons elected to field.	Falcons won by 6 wickets	Dasun Shanaka (KF)	
3 July	4	Jaffna Kings	Kings elected to bowl.	Kings won by 4 wickets	Avishka Fernando (JK)	(Note: Kusal Perera (Dambulla Sixers) scored his first century in T20s.)
6 July	8	Jaffna Kings	Sixers elected to field.	Kings won by 30 runs	Pathum Nissanka (JK)	
7 July	10	Colombo Strikers	Sixers elected to field.	Sixers won by 8 wickets	Kusal Perera (DS)	
9 July	12	Galle Marvels	Marvels elected to field.	Sixers won by 25 runs	Chamindu Wickramasinghe (DS)	
14 July	16	Galle Marvels	Sixers elected to field	Marvels won by super over	Maheesh Theekshana (GM)	
15 July	18	Kandy Falcons	Sixers elected to field.	Falcons won by 54 runs	Wanindu Hasaranga (KF)	
16 July	20	Colombo Strikers	Strikers elected to field.	Sixers won by 28 runs	Mohammad Nabi (DS)	
