= 2022 Lanka Premier League =

Third edition of Lanka Premier League

- Logo of Lanka Premier League 2022
- Dates: 6 – 23 December 2022
- Administrator: Sri Lanka Cricket
- Cricket format: Twenty20
- Tournament format(s): Double Round-robin and Playoffs
- Host: Sri Lanka
- Champions: Jaffna Kings (3rd title)
- Runners-up: Colombo Stars
- Participants: 5
- Matches: 24
- Player of the series: Sadeera Samarawickrama (Jaffna Kings)
- Most runs: Avishka Fernando (Jaffna Kings) (339)
- Most wickets: Carlos Brathwaite (Kandy Falcons) (18)
- Official website: lplt20sl.com

The 2022 Lanka Premier League, also known as Mazaplay LPL T20, for sponsorship reasons, was the third edition of the Lanka Premier League (LPL) Twenty20 franchise cricket tournament in Sri Lanka. It was originally scheduled to take place from 31 July to 21 August 2022 with Sri Lanka Cricket initially having promised to conduct LPL tournament targeting the August window. The ODI series between Pakistan and Sri Lanka was scrapped due to the hosting of this tournament. However, in July 2022, the tournament was postponed due to the economic crisis in Sri Lanka, with the aim to play it later in 2022. The tournament was later rescheduled and held from 6 to 23 December 2022. The tournament also emphasized to promote and boost both the economy and international tourism.

Former Sri Lankan opener Sanath Jayasuriya, former Pakistani ace fast bowler Wasim Akram and former West Indian veteran batsman Viv Richards were appointed as brand ambassadors for the third edition of the tournament. Samantha Dodanwela was appointed as the tournament director replacing Ravin Wickramaratne with the latter decided to resign owing to personal reasons.

The tournament title logo was designed by Miyulika Weeramanthree, a mechanical engineering student from Kandy who was recognised by Sri Lanka Cricket during the LPL logo launch event which was held on 20 October 2022 and she was awarded a cash prize worth US$1000. Sri Lanka Cricket had initiated an open fan competition with the intention of finding the most attractive and suitable creative logo for the competition.

Ada Derana was officially selected as the television broadcasting partner for the event in Sri Lanka. The winners of the tournament were awarded US$100,000 while the runners-up would be awarded US$50,000.

Dambulla Giants became Dambulla Aura with a change in ownership of the franchise. Kandy Warriors also changed to Kandy Falcons.

On 23 December 2022, Jaffna Kings defeated Colombo Stars by 2 wickets in the final, to win their third successive LPL title.

== Squads ==
The players' draft was held on 7 July 2022. However, some changes were later made to respective teams ever since the tournament was reshuffled from August to December. Players from England and Australia later withdrew from the tournament owing to the busy international schedule and 2022–23 Big Bash League season. However, most of the local players who were signed had been retained by the respective franchises and the franchises were allowed to pick new players without a draft ever since the change in the tournament schedule. Danushka Gunathilaka, while in Australia during the middle of the 2022 ICC Men's T20 World Cup, has been accused of sexual assault and has made himself unavailable for the tournament.

Colombo Stars	Dambulla Aura	Galle Gladiators	Jaffna Kings	Kandy Falcons
Angelo Mathews (c); Seekkuge Prasanna; Dinesh Chandimal; Jeffrey Vandersay; Charith Asalanka; Niroshan Dickwella; ~~Dwaine Pretorius~~; ~~Asif Ali~~; Naveen-ul-Haq; Dominic Drakes; Karim Janat; ~~Fazalhaq Farooqi~~; Dhananjaya Lakshan; Ishan Jayaratne; Muditha Lakshan; Lakshitha Manasinghe; Kevin Koththigoda; Chathuranga Kumara; Navod Paranavithana; Chamod Battage; Benny Howell; ~~Romario Shepherd~~; Ravi Bopara; Nishan Madushka; Kasun Rajitha; Suranga Lakmal; Mohammad Nabi	Dasun Shanaka (c); Ramesh Mendis; ~~Nuwan Pradeep~~; Tharindu Ratnayake; Bhanuka Rajapaksa; ~~Ben Cutting~~; ~~D'Arcy Short~~; ~~Sandeep Lamichhane~~; Chaturanga de Silva; ~~Tim Seifert~~; Haider Ali; ~~Sheldon Cottrell~~; Pramod Madushan; Lasith Croospulle; Kalana Perera; Dilum Sudeera; Sachitha Jayathilake; Dushan Hemantha; ~~Sacha De Alwis~~; Ravindu Fernando; Sikandar Raza; Noor Ahmad; Jordan Cox; Tom Abell; Paul van Meekeren; Lahiru Kumara; Shevon Daniel; Lahiru Madushanka; Chamindu Wickramasinghe; Matthew Forde	Kusal Mendis (c); ~~Sarfaraz Ahmed~~; ~~Danushka Gunathilaka~~; Pulina Tharanga; Nuwan Thushara; ~~Faheem Ashraf~~; Lahiru Udara; Lakshan Sandakan; Imad Wasim; ~~Janneman Malan~~; ~~Sherfane Rutherford~~; Azam Khan; Nuwanidu Fernando; Nimesh Vimukthi; Movin Subasingha; Nipun Malinga; Sachindu Colombage; Lakshan Gamage; Tharindu Kaushal; Shammu Ashan; Kusal Perera; Nuwan Pradeep; Iftikhar Ahmed; Asad Shafiq; Anwar Ali; Wahab Riaz	Thisara Perera (c); Shoaib Malik; Maheesh Theekshana; Rahmanullah Gurbaz; Afif Hossain; Ashan Randika; Praveen Jayawickrama; Dhananjaya de Silva; Dunith Wellalage; ~~Hardus Viljoen~~; ~~Evin Lewis~~; ~~Shahnawaz Dahani~~; ~~Tristan Stubbs~~; Suminda Lakshan; Sadeera Samarawickrama; Dilshan Madushanka; Nipun Dananjaya; Vijayakanth Viyaskanth; Theesan Vithushan; Theivendiram Dinoshan; ~~James Neesham~~; Tom Kohler-Cadmore; James Fuller; Waqar Salamkheil; Avishka Fernando; Asitha Fernando; Zaman Khan	Wanindu Hasaranga (c); Kamindu Mendis; Chamika Karunaratne; Carlos Brathwaite; ~~Chris Green~~; Fabian Allen; Andre Fletcher; ~~Dewald Brevis~~; Isuru Udana; ~~Matheesha Pathirana~~; Ashen Bandara; ~~Usman Shinwari~~; Ashan Priyanjan; Minod Bhanuka; Avishka Perera; Ashian Daniel; Malinda Pushpakumara; Janith Liyanage; Lasith Abeyratne; Kavin Bandara; Pathum Nissanka; ~~Ahmed Daniyal~~; Oshane Thomas; Najibullah Zadran; Chamindu Wijesinghe; Zahoor Khan; Milan Rathnayake

== Venues ==
R. Premadasa Stadium in Colombo, Mahinda Rajapaksa International Cricket Stadium in Hambantota and Pallekele International Cricket Stadium in Kandy were selected as the venues.

Colombo	Hambantota	Kandy
R. Premadasa Stadium	Mahinda Rajapaksa International Cricket Stadium	Pallekele International Cricket Stadium
Capacity: 35,000	Capacity: 34,300	Capacity: 35,000
2022 Lanka Premier League is located in Sri Lanka

== Teams and standings ==
Pos	Team	Pld	W	L	NR	Pts	NRR
1	Kandy Falcons (3rd)	8	7	1	0	14	1.884
2	Jaffna Kings (C)	8	6	2	0	12	1.010
3	Colombo Stars (R)	8	3	5	0	6	−0.847
4	Galle Gladiators (4th)	8	2	6	0	4	−0.936
5	Dambulla Aura	8	2	6	0	4	−1.198

Source: ESPN Cricinfo
- The top four teams qualify for the playoffs
- Advance to Qualifier 1
- Advance to Eliminator

== League stage ==
The updated schedule was published on 14 October 2022.

Match 1
6 December 2022
15:00 (D/N)
Scorecard

Jaffna Kings; 137 (19.5 overs)	v	Galle Gladiators; 113 (20 overs)
Dunith Wellalage 30 (20); Iftikhar Ahmed 2/8 (1 over)		Kusal Mendis 51 (43); Binura Fernando 3/22 (3 overs)

Jaffna Kings won by 24 runs
Mahinda Rajapaksa International Cricket Stadium, Hambantota
Umpires: Ravindra Kottahachchi (SL) and Ruchira Palliyaguruge (SL)
Player of the match: Dunith Wellalage (Jaffna Kings)

- Galle Gladiators won the toss and elected to field.

Match 2
6 December 2022
19:30 (N)
Scorecard

Kandy Falcons; 199/1 (20 overs)	v	Colombo Stars; 90 (14.3 overs)
Andre Fletcher 102* (67); Seekkuge Prasanna 1/23 (3 overs)		Angelo Mathews 26 (23); Wanindu Hasaranga 4/14 (3 overs)

Kandy Falcons won by 109 runs.
Mahinda Rajapaksa International Cricket Stadium, Hambantota
Umpires: Chandrika Amarasinghe (SL) and Raveendra Wimalasiri (SL)
Player of the match: Andre Fletcher (Kandy Falcons)

- Colombo Stars won the toss and elected to field.

Match 3
7 December 2022
15:00 (D/N)
Scorecard

Dambulla Aura; 121/9 (20 overs)	v	Jaffna Kings; 122/1 (15.4 overs)
Jordan Cox 43 (22); Mahesh Theekshana 3/20 (4 overs)		Sadeera Samarawickrama 62* (44); Noor Ahmad 1/28 (3.4 overs)

Jaffna Kings won by 9 wickets
Mahinda Rajapaksa International Cricket Stadium, Hambantota
Umpires: Lyndon Hannibal (SL) and Ranmore Martinesz (SL)
Player of the match: Sadeera Samarawickrama (Jaffna Kings)

- Dambulla Aura won the toss and elected to bat.

Match 4
7 December 2022
19:30 (D/N)
Scorecard

Galle Gladiators; 121/8 (20 overs)	v	Kandy Falcons; 123/5 (15 overs)
Movin Subasingha 40 (38); Carlos Brathwaite 4/14 (4 overs)		Kamindu Mendis 44 (34); Nuwan Pradeep 2/34 (3 overs)

Kandy Falcons won by 5 wickets
Mahinda Rajapaksa International Cricket Stadium, Hambantota
Umpires: Chamara de Soysa (SL) and Prageeth Rambukwella (SL)
Player of the match: Carlos Brathwaite (Kandy Falcons)

- Galle Gladiators won the toss and elected to bat.

Match 5
8 December 2022
15:00 (D/N)
Scorecard

Colombo Stars; 165/9 (20 overs)	v	Dambulla Aura; 156/7 (20 overs)
Niroshan Dickwella 62 (41); Lahiru Kumara 4/36 (4 overs)		Tom Abell 33 (22); Suranga Lakmal 2/29 (4 overs)

Colombo Stars won by 9 runs
Mahinda Rajapaksa International Cricket Stadium, Hambantota
Umpires: Chandrika Amarasinghe (SL) and Lyndon Hannibal (SL)
Player of the match: Niroshan Dickwella (Colombo Stars)

- Colombo Stars won the toss and elected to bat.

Match 6
10 December 2022
19:30 (D/N)
Scorecard

Jaffna Kings; 147/7 (20 overs)	v	Kandy Falcons; 148/7 (20 overs)
Avishka Fernando 31 (26); Fabian Allen 2/23 (4 overs)		Ashen Bandara 44* (39); Dunith Wellalage 2/17 (4 overs)

Kandy Falcons won by 3 wickets
Pallekele International Cricket Stadium, Kandy
Umpires: Gregory Brathwaite (WI) and Raveendra Wimalasiri (SL)
Player of the match: Chamika Karunaratne (Kandy Falcons)

- Kandy Falcons won the toss and elected to field.

Match 7
11 December 2022
15:00 (N)
Scorecard

Galle Gladiators; 174/6 (20 overs)	v	Colombo Stars; 149/7 (20 overs)
Lahiru Udara 45* (30); Jeffrey Vandersay 2/31 (4 overs)		Niroshan Dickwella 58* (44); Iftikhar Ahmed 2/12 (2 overs)

Galle Gladiators won by 25 runs
Pallekele International Cricket Stadium, Kandy
Umpires: Ruchira Palliyaguruge (SL) and Chamara de Soysa (SL)
Player of the match: Lahiru Udara (Galle Gladiators)

- Galle Gladiators won the toss and elected to bat.

Match 8
11 December 2022
19:30 (N)
Scorecard

Jaffna Kings; 240/4 (20 overs)	v	Dambulla Aura; 189/8 (20 overs)
Rahmanullah Gurbaz 73 (35); Lahiru Kumara 2/56 (4 overs)		Dasun Shanaka 44 (23); Binura Fernando 4/22 (4 overs)

Jaffna Kings won by 51 runs
Pallekele International Cricket Stadium, Kandy
Umpires: Gregory Brathwaite (WI) and Prageeth Rambukwella (SL)
Player of the match: Rahmanullah Gurbaz (Jaffna Kings)

- Dambulla Aura won the toss and elected to field.

Match 9
12 December 2022
15:00 (D/N)
Scorecard

Galle Gladiators; 153/6 (20 overs)	v	Kandy Falcons; 141/7 (20 overs)
Thanuka Dabare 70 (51); Carlos Brathwaite 3/17 (4 overs)		Ashen Bandara 41* (30); Lakshan Sandakan 2/22 (4 overs)

Galle Gladiators won by 12 runs
Pallekele International Cricket Stadium, Kandy
Umpires: Ravindra Kottahachchi (SL) and Prageeth Rambukwella (SL)
Player of the match: Thanuka Dabare (Galle Gladiators)

- Galle Gladiators won the toss and elected to bat.

Match 10
12 December 2022
19:30 (N)
Scorecard

Jaffna Kings; 178/5 (20 overs)	v	Colombo Stars; 172/8 (20 overs)
Shoaib Malik 35* (26); Benny Howell 2/37 (4 overs)		Angelo Mathews 73* (39); James Fuller 2/32 (4 overs); Vijayakanth Viyaskanth 2/32 (4 overs)

Jaffna Kings won by 6 runs
Pallekele International Cricket Stadium, Kandy
Umpires: Gregory Brathwaite (WI) and Ranmore Martinesz (SL)
Player of the match: James Fuller (Jaffna Kings)

- Colombo Stars won the toss and elected to field.

Match 11
13 December 2022
15:00 (D/N)
Scorecard

Kandy Falcons; 193/3 (20 overs)	v	Dambulla Aura; 116 (14.2 overs)
Kamindu Mendis 58 (40); Chaturanga de Silva 1/26 (3 overs)		Chaturanga de Silva 25 (15); Carlos Brathwaite 3/25 (3 overs); Chamindu Wijesinghe 3/25 (3 overs)

Kandy Falcons won by 77 runs
Pallekele International Cricket Stadium, Kandy
Umpires: Gregory Brathwaite (WI) and Ravindra Kottahachchi (SL)
Player of the match: Kamindu Mendis (Kandy Falcons)

- Kandy Falcons won the toss and elected to bat.

Match 12
13 December 2022
19:30 (N)
Scorecard

Galle Gladiators; 193/5 (20 overs)	v	Colombo Stars; 197/8 (20 overs)
Kusal Mendis 72 (49); Naveen-ul-Haq 2/33 (4 overs)		Dinesh Chandimal 63 (33); Nuwan Thushara 3/29 (4 overs)

Colombo Stars won by 2 wickets
Pallekele International Cricket Stadium, Kandy
Umpires: Ruchira Palliyaguruge (SL) and Prageeth Rambukwella (SL)
Player of the match: Ravi Bopara (Colombo Stars)

- Colombo Stars won the toss and elected to field.

Match 13
14 December 2022
15:00 (N)
Scorecard

Kandy Falcons; 160/8 (20 overs)	v	Jaffna Kings; 150/9 (20 overs)
Fabian Allen 47 (23); Dunith Wellalage 2/7 (4 overs)		Sadeera Samarawickrama 48 (41); Carlos Brathwaite 4/18 (4 overs)

Kandy Falcons won by 10 runs
Pallekele International Cricket Stadium, Kandy
Umpires: Gregory Brathwaite (WI) and Chamara de Soysa (SL)
Player of the match: Fabian Allen (Kandy Falcons)

- Kandy Falcons won the toss and elected to bat.

Match 14
14 December 2022
19:30 (N)
Scorecard

Dambulla Aura; 89 (13.5 overs)	v	Colombo Stars; 90/1 (11.3 overs)
Pramod Madushan 23* (26); Kasun Rajitha 5/22 (4 overs)		Charith Asalanka 58* (36); Pramod Madushan 1/3 (2 overs)

Colombo Stars won by 9 wickets
Pallekele International Cricket Stadium, Kandy
Umpires: Lyndon Hannibal (SL) and Ranmore Martinesz (SL)
Player of the match: Kasun Rajitha (Colombo Stars)

- Colombo Stars won the toss and elected to field.

Match 15
17 December 2022
15:00 (N)
Scorecard

Dambulla Aura; 178/5 (20 overs)	v	Galle Gladiators; 130 (19.4 overs)
Shevon Daniel 80 (55); Nuwan Pradeep 3/37 (3 overs)		Lahiru Udara 32 (32); Pramod Madushan 3/17 (2.4 overs)

Dambulla Aura won by 48 runs
R. Premadasa Stadium, Colombo
Umpires: Kumar Dharmasena (SL) and Ruchira Palliyaguruge (SL)
Player of the match: Jordan Cox (Dambulla Aura)

- Dambulla Aura won the toss and elected to bat.

Match 16
17 December 2022
19:30 (D/N)
Scorecard

Colombo Stars; 106 (19.1 overs)	v	Kandy Falcons; 108/1 (16 overs)
Angelo Mathews 41 (38); Chamika Karunaratne 4/11 (3.1 overs)		Kamindu Mendis 51* (48); Suranga Lakmal 1/19 (2 overs)

Kandy Falcons won by 9 wickets
R. Premadasa Stadium, Colombo
Umpires: Wayne Knights (NZ) and Raveendra Wimalasiri (SL)
Player of the match: Chamika Karunaratne (Kandy Falcons)

- Colombo Stars won the toss and elected to bat.

Match 17
18 December 2022
15:00 (N)
Scorecard

Jaffna Kings; 170/8 (20 overs)	v	Galle Gladiators; 154/9 (20 overs)
Afif Hossain 54 (35); Wahab Riaz 3/37 (4 overs)		Kusal Mendis 58 (45); Binura Fernando 3/20 (4 overs)

Jaffna Kings won by 16 runs
R. Premadasa Stadium, Colombo
Umpires: Kumar Dharmasena (SL) and Ravindra Kottahachchi (SL)
Player of the match: Afif Hossain (Jaffna Kings)

- Jaffna Kings won the toss and elected to bat.

Match 18
18 December 2022
19:30 (D/N)
Scorecard

Kandy Falcons; 160/7 (20 overs)	v	Dambulla Aura; 121/9 (20 overs)
Ashen Bandara 37 (31); Matthew Forde 2/16 (3 overs)		Sikandar Raza 45 (33); Oshane Thomas 3/15 (4 overs)

Kandy Falcons won by 39 runs
R. Premadasa Stadium, Colombo
Umpires: Chamara de Soysa (SL) and Wayne Knights (NZ)
Player of the match: Oshane Thomas (Kandy Falcons)

- Kandy Falcons won the toss and elected to bat.

Match 19
19 December 2022
15:00 (N)
Scorecard

Colombo Stars; 128/9 (20 overs)	v	Jaffna Kings; 131/2 (15.5 overs)
Dominic Drakes 38 (20); Shoaib Malik 2/4 (2 overs)		Rahmanullah Gurbaz 69 (40); Dominic Drakes 1/30 (2.5 overs)

Jaffna Kings won by 8 wickets
R. Premadasa Stadium, Colombo
Umpires: Lyndon Hannibal (SL) and Wayne Knights (NZ)
Player of the match: Rahmanullah Gurbaz (Jaffna Kings)

- Jaffna Kings won the toss and elected to field.

Match 20
19 December 2022
19:30 (D/N)
Scorecard

Galle Gladiators; 129/8 (20 overs)	v	Dambulla Aura; 134/6 (14.2 overs)
Nuwanidu Fernando 63* (42); Matthew Forde 4/11 (4 overs)		Matthew Forde 52 (30); Imad Wasim 2/32 (3.2 overs)

Dambulla Aura won by 4 wickets
R. Premadasa Stadium, Colombo
Umpires: Kumar Dharmasena (SL) and Raveendra Wimalasiri (SL)
Player of the match: Matthew Forde (Dambulla Aura)

- Galle Gladiators won the toss and elected to bat.

== Playoffs ==
Semifinals
21 December 2022 — Colombo
1	Kandy Falcons	143/8 (20 overs)
2	Jaffna Kings	98/3 (11 overs)
21 December 2022 — Colombo
3	Colombo Stars	109/3 (16.5 overs)
4	Galle Gladiators	108/9 (18 overs)

Preliminary final
22 December 2022 — Colombo
1	Kandy Falcons	168/6 (20 overs)
3	Colombo Stars	169/4 (18.5 overs)

Final
23 December 2022 — Colombo
2	Jaffna Kings	164/8 (19.2 overs)
3	Colombo Stars	163/5 (20 overs)

=== Qualifier 1 ===
Match 21
21 December 2022
15:30 (D/N)
Scorecard

Kandy Falcons; 143/8 (20 overs)	v	Jaffna Kings; 98/3 (11 overs)
Pathum Nissanka 35 (31); Vijayakanth Viyaskanth 3/30 (4 overs)		Avishka Fernando 21 (11); Carlos Brathwaite 2/32 (3 overs)

Jaffna Kings won by 24 runs (DLS method)
R. Premadasa Stadium, Colombo
Umpires: Kumar Dharmasena (SL) and Ruchira Palliyaguruge (SL)
Player of the match: Vijayakanth Viyaskanth (Jaffna Kings)

- Kandy Falcons won the toss and elected to bat.
- Jaffna Kings were set a revised target of 75 runs from 11 overs due to rain.
- Rain during Jaffna Kings's innings prevented any further play.

=== Eliminator ===
Match 22
21 December 2022
19:30 (N)
Scorecard

Galle Gladiators; 108/9 (18 overs)	v	Colombo Stars; 109/3 (16.5 overs)
Sahan Arachchige 53 (31); Benny Howell 3/17 (2 overs)		Ravi Bopara 43* (28); Imad Wasim 1/18 (4 overs)

Colombo Stars won by 7 wickets
R. Premadasa Stadium, Colombo
Umpires: Lyndon Hannibal (SL) and Prageeth Rambukwella (SL)
Player of the match: Ravi Bopara (Colombo Stars)

- Colombo Stars won the toss and elected to field.
- The match was reduced to 18 overs per side due to rain.

=== Qualifier 2 ===
Match 23
22 December 2022
19:30 (N)
Scorecard

Kandy Falcons; 168/6 (20 overs)	v	Colombo Stars; 169/4 (18.5 overs)
Wanindu Hasaranga 77* (34); Kasun Rajitha 4/20 (4 overs)		Charith Asalanka 64 (40); Kamindu Mendis 2/26 (4 overs)

Colombo Stars won by 6 wickets
R. Premadasa Stadium, Colombo
Umpires: Wayne Knights (NZ) and Raveendra Wimalasiri (SL)
Player of the match: Kasun Rajitha (Colombo Stars)

- Colombo Stars won the toss and elected to field.

=== Final ===
Match 24
23 December 2022
19:30 (N)
Scorecard

Colombo Stars; 163/5 (20 overs)	v	Jaffna Kings; 164/8 (19.2 overs)
Dinesh Chandimal 49 (40); Thisara Perera 1/16 (2 overs)		Avishka Fernando 50 (43); Suranga Lakmal 3/23 (3 overs)

Jaffna Kings won by 2 wickets
R. Premadasa Stadium, Colombo
Umpires: Kumar Dharmasena (SL) and Wayne Knights (NZ)
Player of the match: Avishka Fernando (Jaffna Kings)

- Jaffna Kings won the toss and elected to field.

== Statistics ==
=== Most runs ===
Player	Team	Matches	Runs	High score
Avishka Fernando	Jaffna Kings	10	339	54
Sadeera Samarawickrama	Jaffna Kings	9	294	62*
Dinesh Chandimal	Colombo Stars	11	287	63
Andre Fletcher	Kandy Falcons	9	266	102*
Kamindu Mendis	Kandy Falcons	10	260	58

- Source: ESPNcricinfo
