= Maheesh Theekshana =

Sri Lankan cricketer (born 2000)

Personal information
- Full name: Morawakage Maheesh Theekshana
- Born: 1 August 2000 (age 26); Colombo, Sri Lanka
- Batting: Right-handed
- Bowling: Right-arm off break
- Role: Bowler

International information
- National side: Sri Lanka (2021-present)
- Test debut (cap 161): 8 July 2022 v Australia
- Last Test: 16 July 2022 v Pakistan
- ODI debut (cap 202): 7 September 2021 v South Africa
- Last ODI: 31 August 2025 v Zimbabwe
- T20I debut (cap 90): 10 September 2021 v South Africa
- Last T20I: 16 February 2026 v Australia

Domestic team information
- Years: Team
- 2020–2023: Jaffna Kings
- 2022–2024: Chennai Super Kings
- 2022: Trinbago Knight Riders
- 2023–2025: Barbados Royals
- 2024; 2025/26: Sharjah Warriorz
- 2024: Galle Marvels
- 2025: Joburg Super Kings
- 2025: Rajasthan Royals
- 2026-Present: Dambulla Sixers
- 2026-Present: Saint Lucia Kings
- 2026-Present: Hyderabad Kingsmen

Career statistics
Competition	Test	ODI	T20I	FC
Matches	2	61	83	5
Runs scored	59	344	107	131
Batting average	19.66	16.38	4.45	16.37
100s/50s	0/0	0/0	0/0	0/0
Top score	38	38*	14	38
Balls bowled	365	2949	1872	779
Wickets	5	81	82	13
Bowling average	37.60	27.66	26.97	32.46
5 wickets in innings	0	0	0	1
10 wickets in match	0	0	0	0
Best bowling	2/28	4/25	3/17	5/76
Catches/stumpings	1/–	13/–	21/0	2/–
Medal record
Representing Sri Lanka
Men's Cricket
Asia Cup
Winner	2022 UAE
Runner-up	2023 Pakistan and Sri Lanka
- Source: ESPNcricinfo, 6 June 2026

Morawakage Maheesh Theekshana (born 1 August 2000), is a cricketer who plays limited overs cricket for Sri Lanka. He made his international debut for Sri Lanka in September 2021.

He is known for bowling spin at high speeds that exceeds 100 km/h and for bowling yorkers by a spinner, which makes difficult for the batsman to face. He is also a handy lower-order batsman. He is best known for his wicket celebration where he imitates an Archer.

== Early life ==
Theekshana grew up with his grandmother and hailed from Siddhartha Vidyalaya, Sedawatta. Two of the old boys from St. Benedict's College, Colombo requested the guardian of Theekshana to switch their location to Kotahena in order to make Theekshana play school cricket representing St. Benedict's College. The Cricket Wing of St. Benedict's volunteered to look after his finances in the first two years and later the St. Benedict's College granted him a scholarship offer. He repaid the faith by winning the All Island Best All Rounder Award during his final year at St. Benedict's College.

== Military career ==
Theekshana joined the Sri Lanka Army, following basic training he served as a Private in the Gajaba Regiment and played for the Sri Lanka Army cricket team. Following the Asia Cup Championship in 2022, he was promoted to the rank of Sergeant.

== Domestic and T20 franchise career ==
After having impressed with the ball at school level, he was called for trials by the National Cricket Academy at R. Premadasa Stadium. He subsequently impressed the spin bowling coaches and director of cricket at National Cricket Academy, Simon Willis with his control, accuracy, bounce, variations in addition to his Ajantha Mendis alike bowling action. However, he was under scrutiny for his body weight as at one stage he weighed at 105 kilograms, 140 skin-folds and he also faced difficulties to pass fitness tests as he took 10.1 minutes to complete the two-kilometre tests and also produced sub par YOYO test conducted by Sri Lanka Cricket. He was also omitted from Sri Lankan U-19 squad for the 2018 Under-19 Cricket World Cup on the basis of fitness issues. According to some sources, Theekshana had weighed around 117 kilograms during his U19 days.

Theekshana made his List A debut for Colts Cricket Club in the 2017–18 Premier Limited Overs Tournament on 14 March 2018. He made his first-class debut for Colts Cricket Club in the 2018–19 Premier League Tournament on 7 December 2018. In October 2020, he was drafted by the Jaffna Stallions for the inaugural edition of the Lanka Premier League. He joined Sri Lanka Army in 2020 and transformed him completely as he began adhering to strict food diets and worked hard on improving his fitness levels. He also subsequently reduced his weight as per the level of expectations levelled on him in order to pursue his cricketing ambitions. By 2020, he had dropped 22 kilograms and halved his skinfold levels. He also improved his two-kilometer run within 10 minutes and improved his YOYO test maximum from 16.1 to 19.2. He trained under Ajantha Mendis who was his first coach with Sri Lanka Army when he joined Army's U-23 team. He was picked in 2020 Lanka Premier League on the back with his impressive performances at 2020 Army Commander's Cup. He initially didn't make the cut for the 2020 Lanka Premier League draft and he was categorized in supplementary category which made him ineligible to play. However, with the recommendation of Thisara Perera he was promoted from supplementary category to emerging category in Jaffna Stallions squad for the 2020 LPL season after the request was accepted by SLC.

In August 2021, Theekshana was named in the SLC Blues team for the 2021 SLC Invitational T20 League tournament. In November 2021, he was selected to play for the Jaffna Kings following the players' draft for the 2021 Lanka Premier League. he ended tournament with highest wicket taker of Lanka Premier League 2021.

In February 2022, he was bought by the Chennai Super Kings in the auction for the 2022 Indian Premier League tournament. During the 2022 edition of the Tata IPL, he broke Rohit Sharma's record to become the youngest ever bowler to take a four-wicket haul in an IPL match as he achieved the landmark at the age of 21 years and 255 days against Royal Challengers Bangalore. In July 2022, he was signed by the Jaffna Kings for the third edition of the Lanka Premier League. In July 2022, he was signed by Trinbago Knight Riders for the 2022 Caribbean Premier League.

In August 2022, he was picked up by Johannesburg Super Kings for the inaugural edition of the South Africa's CSA T20 League which was held in 2023.

== International career ==
Following Theekshana's strong performances in the SLC Invitational T20 league, he was named in Sri Lanka's One Day International (ODI) and Twenty20 International (T20I) squads for their series against South Africa. He made his ODI debut on 7 September 2021, for Sri Lanka against South Africa. In the match, he took a wicket with his first ball in ODI cricket. He took 4 wickets for 37 runs, helping Sri Lanka win the series 2–1. He became the first Sri Lankan international cricketer to be born in the 21st century. He made his T20I debut on 10 September 2021, also for Sri Lanka against South Africa. Later the same month, Theekshana was named in Sri Lanka's squad for the 2021 ICC Men's T20 World Cup. He ended the tournament as second highest wicket taker for Sri Lanka with eight scalps.

In June 2022, he achieved his career best eighth ranking in ICC Men's T20I Player Rankings for bowlers.

In July 2022, he was added to Sri Lanka's Test squad for the second match against Australia. He made his Test debut on 8 July 2022, for Sri Lanka against Australia. In August 2022, he was included in Sri Lanka's squad for the 2022 Asia Cup. Along with Wanindu Hasaranga, Theekshana made the spin bowling department, where Sri Lanka eventually won the tournament for the sixth time. Theekshana made consistent wicket taking option for skipper Dasun Shanaka, where he ended the tournament with 6 wickets for 162 runs with an economy of 6.75.

In May 2024, he was named in Sri Lanka's squad for the 2024 ICC Men's T20 World Cup tournament.

== Controversy ==
The fans of Chennai Super Kings expressed their grief and vent their frustrations in disbelief by trending hashtags #Boycott_ChennaiSuperKings and #DontNormalizeTamilGenocide in various social media platforms soon after Chennai Super Kings bought Theekshana during the 2022 IPL auction since he had served in the Sri Lankan army.
