= Graham Ford =

South African cricketer and coach (born 1960)

Personal information
- Full name: Graham Xavier Ford
- Born: 16 November 1960 (age 65); Pietermaritzburg, Natal, Union of South Africa
- Batting: Right-handed
- Bowling: Right-arm off spin
- Role: Coach
- Relatives: Matt Ford (son); Greg Ford (son)

Domestic team information
- Years: Team
- 1982/83–1989/90: Natal B
- FC debut: 12 November 1982 Natal B v Western Province B
- Last FC: 6 January 1990 Natal B v Eastern Province B

Head coaching information
- Years: Team
- 2012–2014: Sri Lanka
- 2014–2016: Surrey
- 2016–2017: Sri Lanka
- 2017–2021: Ireland

Career statistics
Competition	First-class
Matches	7
Runs scored	162
Batting average	13.50
100s/50s	0/0
Top score	43
Catches/stumpings	3/–
- Source: Cricinfo, 31 July 2009

Graham Xavier Ford (born 16 November 1960) is a South African cricket coach and former cricketer.

Formerly the head coach of the Sri Lankan national cricket team, he was also the head coach of the Ireland cricket team. A right-handed batsman, he played seven games for Natal B in his career despite playing his last game seven years after his debut in 1982/83. He was a good allrounder sportsman, being a former provincial tennis champion and representing Natal at football. Ford is also a qualified rugby union referee.

== Cricket coaching career ==
In 1992, he became coach of Natal where he enjoyed the services of Malcolm Marshall, Clive Rice, Shaun Pollock, Jonty Rhodes and Lance Klusener. He led the province to victory in both the first class and one day trophies in 1996–97.

Ford coached the South Africa A side in 1998 in a tour of Sri Lanka and the following year was named the assistant coach of South Africa. As assistant to Bob Woolmer, he coached South Africa in the 1999 World Cup where they reached the semi-finals before being eliminated by Australia. Following the tournament he replaced Woolmer as coach and led the country to victory in 8 of the 11 series that they played but having suffered back-to-back defeats against Australia he lost his job in June 2002.

Ford became director of cricket at Kent in 2005. In 2006, he returned to South Africa to coach the Dolphins, but left the role the same year for personal reasons.

On 9 June 2007, he was offered the position of coach of the Indian cricket team, but two days later he declined the offer, citing "it was the right decision for me and my family".

It was announced on 31 July 2009 that he would not be returning to Kent for the 2010 season, again citing personal reasons.

In January 2012, he was appointed as the head coach of the Sri Lanka national team, replacing Geoff Marsh.

In September 2013, he declined to extend his two-year term beyond January 2014 and stepped down from his post as head coach of Sri Lanka national team. On 27 February 2014, he accepted the post of head coach at Surrey County Cricket Club. Kumar Sangakkara, in the twilight of his career, cited Ford's presence at Surrey as a reason for him to go there in 2015 and praised his influence on Sri Lankan cricket.

In January 2016, Ford was once again appointed as the head coach of the Sri Lankan national cricket team. However, Sri Lanka Cricket contracted Ford until 2019 ICC Cricket World Cup, his second tenure ended after 15 months in late June 2017.

In September 2017, Ford was appointed as Ireland's head coach initially on a three-year contract but his contract with Cricket Ireland was further extended by three years in 2019. During his tenure as the head coach of Ireland men's national cricket team, he oversaw a transitional phase with the team. Ireland also eventually received the ICC test status during his coaching stint and Ireland played in as many as 101 international matches under his guidance.

In November 2021, he resigned from the position of Ireland head coach citing bio-bubble fatigue, mental health concerns and family commitments.
