= Isuru Udana =

Sri Lankan cricketer

Personal information
- Full name: Kande Arachchige Isuru Udana Tillakaratna
- Born: 17 February 1988 (age 38); Balangoda, Sri Lanka
- Nickname: Izy
- Height: 1.82 m (6 ft 0 in)
- Batting: Right-handed
- Bowling: Left-arm medium
- Role: All-rounder

International information
- National side: Sri Lanka (2009–2021)
- ODI debut (cap 152): 24 July 2012 v India
- Last ODI: 18 July 2021 v India
- T20I debut (cap 29): 8 June 2009 v Australia
- Last T20I: 28 July 2021 v India

Domestic team information
- Years: Team
- 2008: Tamil Union
- 2009: Wayamba
- 2013: Duronto Rajshahi
- 2018: Paktia Super Kings
- 2019: Rajshahi Kings
- 2020: Royal Challengers Bangalore
- 2020: Colombo Kings
- 2021: Galle Gladiators
- 2022: Minister Dhaka
- 2022: Kandy Falcons

Career statistics
Competition	ODI	T20I	FC	LA
Matches	21	35	97	144
Runs scored	237	256	2,687	1,707
Batting average	16.92	18.28	24.65	20.81
100s/50s	0/1	0/1	2/13	0/5
Top score	78	84*	109*	78
Balls bowled	909	631	10,408	5,592
Wickets	18	27	202	173
Bowling average	52.77	33.88	30.80	28.57
5 wickets in innings	0	0	3	1
10 wickets in match	0	0	0	0
Best bowling	3/82	3/11	7/58	5/59
Catches/stumpings	6/–	4/–	61/–	63/1
Medal record
Representing Sri Lanka
Men's Cricket
Asian Games
Gold medal – first place	2014 Incheon	Team
ICC World T20
Runner-up	2009 England
- Source: ESPNcricinfo, 12 March 2023

Kande Arachchige Isuru Udana Tillakaratna (Sinhala: ඉසුරු උදාන; born 17 February 1988) is a former Sri Lankan cricketer who represented Sri Lanka internationally in limited over formats. He currently plays domestic cricket for Tamil Union and Wayamba. Primarily a left-arm fast bowler, Udana evolved as an all-rounder in late 2018. On 31 July 2021, Udana announced his retirement from international cricket.

== Domestic and franchise career ==
Udana made his first-class and List A cricket debuts whilst playing for the Sri Lanka A team during their tour to South Africa in August and September 2008. He subsequently went on to play for Tamil Union in both formats during the 2008–09 season. He was then selected by Wayamba to play in both the first-class and Twenty20 portions of the Sri Lankan Inter-Provincial Cricket Tournament. In the Twenty20 final against Basnahira South he was named Man of the Match after taking 4–31, his scalps being 4 of the top 5 batsmen. He was also named player of the tournament.

In the Sri Lanka Premier League which was held in August 2012, he managed to showcase his all-round talent by taking regular wickets for his team Wayamba United, and chipping in with the bat at times. His key performance came against Uva Next in the tournament semi final when he scored 42 which almost helped Wayamba to pull off an impossible chase from 27/7 to 151–8. In that same semi final clash he along with Azhar Mahmood set the highest ever 8th wicket partnership in any forms of T20s. (120)

On 22 September 2010, while playing for Wayamba in the 2010 Champions League T20, Udana completed a rare feat by taking a hat-trick of two (legal) deliveries. Mathew Sinclair, the second wicket of the hat-trick was out stumped off a wide-ball. Isuru Udana also became the first bowler to take a hattrick in Champions League T20 history.

In April 2018, he was named in Kandy's squad for the 2018 Super Provincial One Day Tournament. He was the leading wicket-taker for Kandy in the tournament, with ten dismissals in six matches.

On 3 June 2018, he was selected to play for the Montreal Tigers in the players' draft for the inaugural edition of the Global T20 Canada tournament.

In August 2018, he was named in Dambulla's squad the 2018 SLC T20 League. In October 2018, he was the leading wicket-taker in the 2018–19 Afghanistan Premier League, with seventeen dismissals in eight matches. The following month, he was named in the squad for the Rajshahi Kings team, following the draft for the 2018–19 Bangladesh Premier League.

In March 2019, he was named in Dambulla's squad for the 2019 Super Provincial One Day Tournament. In June 2019, he was selected to play for the Montreal Tigers franchise team in the 2019 Global T20 Canada tournament. In September 2019, he was named in the squad for the Paarl Rocks team for the 2019 Mzansi Super League tournament.

In the 2020 IPL auction, he was bought by the Royal Challengers Bangalore for ₹50 lakh (US$53,000) ahead of the 2020 Indian Premier League. In October 2020, he was drafted by the Colombo Kings for the inaugural edition of the Lanka Premier League.

Ahead of the 2021 Indian Premier League, he was released by Royal Challengers Bangalore. He was picked by Trinbago Knight Riders ahead of the 2021 Caribbean Premier League. He took his first wicket haul in T20 cricket during a league match against Barbados Royals in 2021 CPL season and also registered his career best T20 bowling figures of 5/21.

In November 2021, he was selected to play for the Galle Gladiators following the players' draft for the 2021 Lanka Premier League. In July 2022, he was signed by the Kandy Falcons for the third edition of the Lanka Premier League.

== International career ==
Udana was selected in the Sri Lanka squad for the 2009 ICC World Twenty20. He made his Twenty20 international debut on 8 June 2009 against Australia during the T20 World Cup tournament. He played in 5 of Sri Lanka's 7 games in the tournament, including their loss in the final to Pakistan.

Udana failed to continue his domestic success at the international level, and subsequently was dropped from the team after the home series against Pakistan in 2009. He made a comeback into the Sri Lankan squad in 2012 when the selection panel headed by Ashantha de Mel named him for the T20s against Pakistan at home. He was then selected for the ODIs against India which followed the Pakistan series and made his ODI debut on 24 July 2012 against India. However, he again failed to deliver in a bilateral series. His only significant contribution in that series was a direct hit to run out Gautam Gambhir at a key moment in one of the games.

After a long scarce in international arena, Udana got a chance to play in Twenty20 International series against New Zealand in 2016. The comeback was very good at first few balls in the second T20I, where easy catch of Martin Guptill was dropped by Thisara Perera on Udana's bowling. Since then, Udana was brutally hit by New Zealanders and Udana gave 34 runs in his 3 overs, where New Zealand won the match by 9 wickets only in the 10th over.

In May 2018, he was one of 33 cricketers to be awarded a national contract by Sri Lanka Cricket ahead of the 2018–19 season.

In March 2019, during the fourth ODI against South Africa, Udana and Kasun Rajitha made the highest partnership for the tenth wicket for Sri Lanka in an ODI match, with 58 runs. On 22 March, during a T20I match against South Africa national cricket team, he broke the world record for highest individual score (84) batting at number eight in a T20I match.

In April 2019, he was named in Sri Lanka's squad for the 2019 Cricket World Cup. During the second T20I against India on 7 January 2020, Udana injured his back, causing him to be ruled out from the series

On 31 July 2021, Udana announced retirement from International cricket.
