= Jaffna Kings =

Jaffna based franchise cricket team of the Lanka Premier League

- Nickname: Kings of The North
- League: Lanka Premier League

Personnel
- Captain: Bhanuka Rajapaksha
- Coach: Thilina Kandamby
- Owner: Anchor Sports

Team information
- City: Jaffna, Northern Province, Sri Lanka
- Colours: Blue; Gold
- Founded: 2020: Jaffna Stallions; 2021: Jaffna Kings

History
- LPL wins: 4 (2020, 2021, 2022, 2024)
T20I kit

Jaffna Kings (Tamil: யாழ்ப்பாணம் கிங்ஸ்), formerly known as Jaffna Stallions, is a Sri Lankan franchise cricket team which plays in the Lanka Premier League (LPL). The Kings are the current title holders of the tournament.

The team was coached by former Sri Lankan captain Thilina Kandamby. Thisara Perera was the team's captain for the first four seasons.

== Franchise history ==
=== 2020 season ===
The team was owned by a consortium consisting of Sri Lankans and Indians from all over the world including Australia, Canada, France, United Kingdom, and the USA. Arnold Anandan and Rahul Sood, creator of Microsoft Ventures M12, were leading the consortium of tech industry leaders from the Pacific Northwest and Silicon Valley. Among others, Rahul Sood was cited as a tech leader from the Seattle area who is investing in cricket, where the Jaffna Stallions also announced a global education partnership with Code.org. As part of their outreach to the country of Sri Lanka the Jaffna Stallions released a song in partnership with famous artists La Signore, aka Lahiru Perera, and Dinesh Gamage, the song contains lyrics in both Sinhalese and Tamil and it's now trending at the top of the charts in Sri Lanka.

On 16 December 2020, the team won the inaugural Lanka Premier League Championship. The team captain Thisara Perera and Shoaib Malik both played pivotal roles in the win.

=== 2021 season ===
In July 2021, Sri Lanka Cricket (SLC) terminated the franchise ahead of the 2021 Lanka Premier League due to financial issues. In September 2021, the team changed its name to Jaffna Kings after Lyca Group took over the ownership.

=== 2026 season ===
In April 2025, Sri Lanka Cricket (SLC) announced that franchise owners Lyca Group had been terminated ahead of the 2025 Lanka Premier League due to their failure to fulfill the obligations of a team owner in the Lanka Premier League.

Prior to the player draft in 2026, the franchise was brought by Sports Commune, led by Indian sports entrepreneurs Manjot Kalra and Mayank Goel. Before the players' draft, Bhanuka Rajapaksa, Shakib Al Hasan, Taskin Ahmed and Dunith Wellalage were signed by the Kings as pre-draft signings.

On 23 July 2026, Sports Commune was terminated as the owner of Jaffna Kings due to its involvement in match-fixing. To stabilise the franchise, SLC and the league's commercial rights holder, the IPG Group, assumed full operational control of the team and took over all player, coaching, and support-staff contracts.

On 4 August 2026, ahead of the playoffs, the Lanka Premier League and Stockholm-based sports group Anchor Sports announced that the group, co-owned by entrepreneur Nagendra Siddoutam and former India fast bowler Zaheer Khan, had acquired the franchise. Following the acquisition, the team was officially rebranded as Anchor Jaffna Kings.

== Current squad ==
No.	Name	Nat.	Date of birth	Batting style	Bowling style	Year signed	Salary (US$)	Category	Notes
Batters
28	**Avishka Fernando**	(Sri Lanka)	5 April 1998 (age 28)	Right handed	Right-arm off break	2026	50,000	Local Platinum	
54	**Bhanuka Rajapaksa**	(Sri Lanka)	24 October 1991 (age 34)	Left handed	Right-arm medium fast	2026	80,000	Local Icon	**Captain**
36	**Khawaja Nafay**	(Pakistan)	13 February 2002 (age 24)	Right handed	Right-arm Off-break	2026	30,000	Overseas Gold	Replacement for Ibrahim Zadran
27	**Nuwanidu Fernando**	(Sri Lanka)	13 October 1999 (age 26)	Right handed	Right-arm off break	2026	20,000	Local Classic	
1	Sineth Jayawardhana	(Sri Lanka)	25 December 2004 (age 21)	Left handed	Right-arm off break	2026	10,000	Emerging U23	
77	**Tawhid Hridoy**	(Bangladesh)	4 December 2000 (age 25)	Right handed	Right-arm off break	2026	60,000	Overseas Star	Replacement for Taskin Ahmed
Wicket-keepers
42	**Kamil Mishara**	(Sri Lanka)	24 April 2001 (age 25)	Left handed	Right-arm off break	2026	30,000	Local Gold	
7	Vishad Randika	(Sri Lanka)	2 September 1997 (age 29)	Right handed	—	2026	30,000	Gold Optional	Replacement for Nishan Madushka
All-rounders
75	**Shakib Al Hasan**	(Bangladesh)	24 March 1987 (age 39)	Left handed	Slow left-arm orthodox	2026	80,000	Overseas Icon	
9	**Dunith Wellalage**	(Sri Lanka)	9 January 2003 (age 23)	Left handed	Slow left-arm orthodox	2026	60,000	Local Star	**Vice Captain**
96	**David Wiese**	(Namibia)	18 May 1985 (age 41)	Right handed	Right-arm medium fast	2026	50,000	Overseas Platinum	
22	**Chamindu Wickramasinghe**	(Sri Lanka)	6 September 2002 (age 24)	Left handed	Right-arm medium fast	2026	20,000	Local Classic	
Spin bowlers
33	**Piyush Chawla**	(India)	24 December 1988 (age 37)	Left handed	Right-arm leg break	2026	20,000	Overseas Classic	Playing until Sandeep Lamichhane is unavailable.
25	**Sandeep Lamichhane**	(Nepal)	2 August 2000 (age 26)	Right handed	Right-arm leg break	2026	20,000	Overseas Classic	
79	Treveen Mathews	(Sri Lanka)	24 June 2004 (age 22)	Right handed	Right-arm off break	2026	30,000	Local Gold	
46	Praveen Maneesha	(Sri Lanka)	12 November 2005 (age 20)	Right handed	Right-arm leg break	2026	10,000	Emerging U23	
Pace bowlers
98	**Dilshan Madushanka**	(Sri Lanka)	18 September 2000 (age 26)	Right handed	Left-arm fast medium fast	2026	30,000	Local Gold	
23	**Lizaad Williams**	(South Africa)	1 October 1993 (age 32)	Left handed	Right-arm medium fast	2026	20,000	Overseas Classic	
41	**Mohamed Shiraz**	(Sri Lanka)	13 February 1995 (age 31)	Right handed	Right-arm medium fast	2026	20,000	Local Classic	
10	**Zahoor Khan**	(United Arab Emirates)	25 May 1989 (age 37)	Right handed	Right-arm medium fast	2026	15,000	Overseas Associate Star	
Source(s) | ThePapare, Inside Sport & Sri Lanka Cricket

== Administration and support staff ==
Position	Name
Director	Ganeshan Vaheesan
Manager	Charinda Fernando
Head coach	Thilina Kandamby
Assistant coach	Mario Villavarayan
Assistant coach	Hemang Badani
Batting coach	Jehan Mubarak
Bowling coach	Sachith Pathirana
Fielding coach	Vimukthi Deshapriya

=== History ===
Season	Head coach	Assistant coach
2020	Thilina Kandamby	Mario Villavarayan
2021	Thilina Kandamby	Mario Villavarayan
2022	Thilina Kandamby	Mario Villavarayan
2023	Thilina Kandamby	Mario Villavarayan
2024	Avishka Gunawardene	Mario Villavarayan
2026	Thilina Kandamby	

== Seasons ==
Year	League table standing	Final standing
2020	3rd out of 5	Champions
2021	1st out of 5	Champions
2022	2nd out of 5	Champions
2023	4th out of 5	Playoffs
2024	2nd out of 5	Champions
2026	1st out of 5	Runners-up

== Captains ==
=== Captains ===
No.	Player	From	To	Mat	Won	Lost	Tied	NR	Win%
1	Thisara Perera (Sri Lanka)	2020	2023	45	28	16	0	1	61.64
2	Charith Asalanka (Sri Lanka)	2024	2024	11	7	4	0	0	63.63
3	Bhanuka Rajapaksha (Sri Lanka)	2026	2026	10	6	3	0	1	66.66

== Statistics ==
=== By season ===
Season	Pld	W	L	NR	Win%	Pos.	Summary	Most runs	Most wickets
2020	10	6	3	1	66.66	3/5	Champions	Avishka Fernando (275)	Wanindu Hasaranga (17)
2021	11	8	3	0	72.72	1/5	Champions	Avishka Fernando (312)	Maheesh Theekshana (16)
2022	10	8	2	0	80.00	2/5	Champions	Avishka Fernando (339)	Vijayakanth Viyaskanth (13)
2023	9	3	6	0	33.33	4/5	Playoffs	Shoaib Malik (160)	Nuwan Thushara (11)
2024	11	7	4	0	63.63	2/5	Champions	Rilee Rossouw (389)	Fabian Allen (10)
2026	10	6	3	1	66.66	1/5	Runners-up	Kamil Mishara (411)	Lizaad Williams (16)
Total	61	38	21	2	64.40		4 Titles	Avishka Fernando (1532)	Maheesh Theekshana (33)

- Source: Cricinfo

=== Individual records ===
==== Most runs ====
As of 09 August 2026

Runs	Player	Seasons
1527	Avishka Fernando (Sri Lanka)	2020–2026
674	Shoaib Malik (Pakistan)	2020–2023
607	Rahmanullah Gurbaz (Afghanistan)	2021–2023
580	Thisara Perera (Sri Lanka)	2020–2023
411	Kamil Mishara (Sri Lanka)	2026
389	Rilee Rossouw (South Africa)	2024
349	Dunith Wellalage (Sri Lanka)	2022-2026
341	Charith Asalanka (Sri Lanka)	2020–2024
333	Pathum Nissanka (Sri Lanka)	2024
329	Kusal Mendis (Sri Lanka)	2024

- Source: Cricinfo

==== Highest individual score ====
As of 09 August 2026

Runs	Player	Opposition	Venue	Date
119	Pathum Nissanka (Sri Lanka)	Kandy Falcons	Dambulla	9 July 2024
108*	Rilee Rossouw (South Africa)	Colombo Strikers	Dambulla	10 July 2024
108*	Kamil Mishara (Sri Lanka)	Galle Gallants	Colombo	5 August 2026
106*	Rilee Rossouw (South Africa)	Galle Marvels	Colombo	21 July 2024
105*	Kusal Mendis (Sri Lanka)	Kandy Falcons	Colombo	20 July 2024

- Source: Cricinfo

==== Most career wickets ====
As of 09 August 2026

Wickets.	Player	Seasons
33	Maheesh Theekshana (Sri Lanka)	2020–2023
30	Dunith Wellalage (Sri Lanka)	2022–2026
28	Wanindu Hasaranga (Sri Lanka)	2020–2021
25	Vijayakanth Viyaskanth (Sri Lanka)	2020–2024
24	Dilshan Madushanka (Sri Lanka)	2022-2026
16	Lizaad Williams (South Africa)	2026
15	Jayden Seales (Cricket West Indies)	2021
15	Thisara Perera (Sri Lanka)	2020–2023
15	Suranga Lakmal (Sri Lanka)	2020–2021
14	Binura Fernando (Sri Lanka)	2020–2022

- Source: Cricinfo

==== Best figures in an innings ====
As of 09 August 2026

Figures	Player	Opposition	Venue	Date
4/10	Dunith Wellalage (Sri Lanka)	Galle Titans	Pallekele	4 August 2023
4/13	Jayden Seales (Cricket West Indies)	Colombo Stars	Colombo	16 December 2021
4/16	Chathuranga de Silva (Sri Lanka)	Dambulla Giants	Colombo	13 December 2021
4/22	Binura Fernando (Sri Lanka)	Dambulla Aura	Pallekele	11 December 2022
4/24	Fabian Allen (Cricket West Indies)	Kandy Falcons	Colombo	20 July 2024

- Source: Cricinfo

== Team identity ==
=== Anthem ===
Year	Anthem	Artist(s)
2020	Vaadaa Machan	Lahiru Perera, Dinesh Gamage
2022	Adidaa Macha	Hana Shafa, Satheeshan, Krish Manoj

=== Kit manufacturers and sponsors ===
Year	Kit manufacturer	Shirt sponsor (front)	Shirt sponsor (back)	Chest branding	Sleeve branding
2020		Jura Trading	BBK Partnership	Code.org	Zestige, Pro You™
2021		Lyca Mobile	Cycle Incense	NLB	Cycle Incense
2022		SkyExch		—N/a	Lyca Mobile
2023		1xBet	Wolf777	Batbricks7	SBC TV, Lyca Mobile
2024		MelBat	MGlion News	—N/a	Monara TV, Jumbo365
2026		Colombo Marathon	Anchor Sports	Onyx Nutrition	Play.Book, COD Sri Lanka, IPG Group

== Honours ==
=== League ===
- Lanka Premier League
  - Champions (4): 2020, 2021, 2022, 2024
