= Galle Gallants =

Galle based franchise cricket team of the Lanka Premier League

- Official logo of Galle Gallants
- League: Lanka Premier League

Personnel
- Captain: Dasun Shanaka
- Coach: Pubudu Dassanayake
- Owner: Gallant Sports and Media LLC

Team information
- City: Galle, Southern Province, Sri Lanka
- Founded: 2020: Galle Gladiators; 2023: Galle Titans; 2024: Galle Marvels; 2026: Galle Gallants
- Home ground: Galle International Stadium, Galle
- Capacity: 35,000

History
- LPL wins: 1 (2026)
- Official website: gallegallants.com
T20I kit

Galle Gallants, formerly known as Galle Marvels, Galle Titans and Galle Gladiators, is a Sri Lankan franchise professional Twenty20 cricket team that competes in the Lanka Premier League, Sri Lanka and represents the city of Galle, Southern Province. Ahead of the sixth edition of LPL in 2026, Gallant Sports and Media LLC acquired the Galle franchise and the name of the team was changed to Galle Gallants.

== Franchise history ==
=== 2023 season ===
Before the LPL auction, the Galle team was purchased by a Sri Lankan businessman named Nayana Wasalathilake. Under the new ownership, the Galle franchise was renamed Galle Titans.

=== 2024 season ===
Ahead of the fifth edition of LPL, the Galle franchise was acquired by owner Mr. Prem Thakkar, Cricket Marvels LLC in February 2024. The team was launched in a ceremony held in Shangri-La Colombo with Sports Minister Harin Fernando, LPL tournament director Samantha Dodanwela, tournament organiser IPG Group's CEO Anil Mohan and veteran cricketer Sanath Jayasuriya in attendance. In May 2024, Galle Marvels announced their key signings for the upcoming season. England's Alex Hales was roped in as the team's icon player. New Zealand's Tim Seifert was retained from the previous season. For local players, Bhanuka Rajapaksha and Lasith Croospulle were retained in the squad while Maheesh Theekshana was roped in as the local icon player. Niroshan Dickwella was also pre-signed. Graham Ford and Sanath Jayasuriya were contracted for the head coach and mentor roles respectively.

The Dambulla Sixers decided to wear pink jerseys to promote breast cancer awareness and encourage self-examination during the match between Marvels and Sixers on July 14. Galle Marvels also wore a special jersey that mixed pink with their usual neon green to support Dambulla Sixers' program.

=== 2026 season ===
Gallant Sports and Media LLC acquired the Galle franchise in May, renaming it the "Galle Gallants". Ahead of the 2026 Lanka Premier League players' draft, the Gallants secured Dasun Shanaka, Sikandar Raza, Eshan Malinga, and Rassie van der Dussen as their pre-draft signings, with Shanaka appointed to lead the franchise as captain. Meanwhile, Pubudu Dassanayake was appointed as the head coach for the 2026 season.

In the final, Gallants defeated Jaffna Kings by 5 wickets to win their maiden title. Sam Harper and Eshan Malinga of Gallants scored the most runs (424) and took the most wickets (17) respectively. Also, Malinga was the highest wicket taker of the season.

== Current squad ==
- Sources: Cricinfo, ThePapare.com
- Players with international caps are listed in **bold**.

No.	Name	Nationality	Date of birth (age)	Batting style	Bowling style	Year signed	Salary (US$)	Notes
Batters
33	**Lasith Croospulle**	Sri Lanka	10 October 1998 (age 28)	Right handed	Right-arm off break	2026	30,000	
50	**Chris Lynn**	Australia	10 April 1990 (age 36)	Right handed	Slow left-arm Orthodox	2026	80,000	
3	Thomas Rogers	Australia	7 February 1999 (age 27)	Left-handed	Right-arm medium-fast	2026	20,000	Replacement for Mehidy Hasan Miraz
Wicket-keepers
6	Sam Harper	Australia	10 December 1996 (age 29)	Right-handed	—N/a	2026	20,000	Overseas
18	**Nurul Hasan**	Bangladesh	21 November 1993 (age 32)	Right handed	—N/a	2026	60,000	Overseas
All-rounders
43	**Sahan Arachchige**	Sri Lanka	13 May 1996 (age 30)	Left handed	Right-arm off break	2026	20,000	
29	**Chamika Karunarathne**	Sri Lanka	29 May 1996 (age 30)	Right-handed	Right-arm medium-fast	2026	20,000	
7	**Dasun Shanaka**	Sri Lanka	9 September 1991 (age 35)	Right handed	Right-arm medium-fast	2026	80,000	**Captain**
76	Dinura Kalupahana	Sri Lanka	16 June 2005 (age 21)	Right handed	Right-arm medium-fast	2026	10,000	
27	**Tharindu Rathnayake**	Sri Lanka	18 April 1996 (age 30)	Left-handed	Ambidextrous spin	2026	20,000	
72	**Charith Asalanka**	Sri Lanka	29 June 1997 (age 29)	Left-handed	Right-arm off-break	2026	50,000	**Vice Captain**
21	**Mohammad Nawaz**	Pakistan	21 March 1994 (age 32)	Left-handed	Slow left-arm Orthodox	2026	50,000	Overseas
	**Virandeep Singh**	Malaysia	23 March 1999 (age 27)	Right-handed	Slow left-arm Orthodox	2026	15,000	Overseas
Spin bowlers
55	**Vijayakanth Viyaskanth**	Sri Lanka	5 December 2001 (age 24)	Right handed	Right arm leg break	2026	30,000	
35	Yuri Koththigoda	Sri Lanka	7 January 2006 (age 20)	Left handed	Slow Left-arm Orthodox	2026	10,000	
54	Sachindu Colombage	Sri Lanka	21 February 1998 (age 28)	Right handed	Right-arm leg break	2026	20,000	
Pace bowlers
97	**Eshan Malinga**	Sri Lanka	4 February 2001 (age 25)	Left-handed	Right-arm medium-fast	2026	60,000	
65	**Kasun Rajitha**	Sri Lanka	1 June 1993 (age 33)	Right-handed	Right-arm medium-fast	2026	30,000	
40	**Pramod Madushan**	Sri Lanka	14 December 1993 (age 32)	Right handed	Right-arm medium-fast	2026	30,000	
88	**Akif Javed**	Pakistan	10 October 2000 (age 26)	Right handed	Left-arm fast	2026	30,000	Overseas

== Administration and support staff ==
Position	Name	Ref.
Head coach	Pubudu Dassanayake	
Assistant coach		
Bowling and fielding coach		
Chief operating officer (COO)	Roy Silva	
Chief strategy officer (CSO)	Sharath Sriramoju	

=== Coaching history ===
Season	Head coach	Assistant coach
2020	Moin Khan	Upul Chandana
2021	Umar Gul	Indika de Silva
2022	Moin Khan	Umar Gul
2023	Chamara Kapugedera	
2024	Graham Ford	Chamara Kapugedera
2026	(Sri Lanka) Pubudu Dassanayake	(Sri Lanka) Chamila Gamage

== Seasons ==
Year	League table standing	Final standing
2020	4th out of 5	Runners up
2021	2nd out of 5	Runners up
2022	4th out of 5	Playoffs
2023	2nd out of 5	Playoffs
2024	1st out of 5	Runners up
2026	2nd out of 5	Champions

== Statistics ==
=== By season ===
Season	Pld	W	L	NR	Win%	Pos.	Summary	Most runs	Most wickets
2020	10	3	7	0	30.00	4/5	Runners-up	Danushka Gunathilaka (476)	Dhananjaya Lakshan (13)
2021	10	5	4	1	55.55	2/5	Runners-up	Kusal Mendis (327)	Samit Patel (16)
2022	9	2	7	0	22.22	4/5	Playoffs	Kusal Mendis (256)	Nuwan Thushara (14)
2023	10	4	6	0	40.00	2/5	Playoffs	Lasith Croospulle (232)	Tabraiz Shamsi (12)
2024	10	6	4	0	60.00	1/5	Runners-up	Tim Seifert (400)	Isuru Udana (14)
2026	11	7	4	0	63.63	2/5	Champions	Sam Harper (425)	Eshan Malinga (17)
Total	60	27	32	1	45.76		1 Title	Bhanuka Rajapaksha (703)	Nuwan Thushara (30)

- Source: Cricinfo

==== Most runs ====
As of 11 August 2026

Runs	Player	Seasons
703	Bhanuka Rajapaksha (Sri Lanka)	2020-2024
702	Danushka Gunathilake (Sri Lanka)	2020-2021
631	Tim Seifert (New Zealand)	2023-2024
583	Kusal Mendis (Sri Lanka)	2021-2022
441	Sahan Arachchige (Sri Lanka)	2020–2026
425	Sam Harper (Australia)	2026
385	Charith Asalanka (Sri Lanka)	2026
369	Dasun Shanaka (Sri Lanka)	2023-2026
326	Alex Hales (England)	2024
262	Lasith Croospulle (Sri Lanka)	2023-2026

- Source: Cricinfo

==== Highest individual score ====
As of 11 August 2026

Runs	Player	Opposition	Venue	Date
104*	Tim Seifert (New Zealand)	Jaffna Kings	Dambulla	5 July 2024
94*	Danushka Gunathilake (Sri Lanka)	Kandy Tuskers	Hambantota	10 December 2020
86*	Alex Hales (England)	Kandy Falcons	Dambulla	10 July 2024
85	Kusal Mendis (Sri Lanka)	Jaffna Kings	Hambantota	19 December 2021
82*	Tim Seifert (New Zealand)	Kandy Falcons	Dambulla	7 July 2024
82	Danushka Gunathilake (Sri Lanka)	Kandy Tuskers	Hambantota	30 November 2020
82	Bhanuka Rajapaksha (Sri Lanka)	Jaffna Kings	Colombo	21 July 2024

- Source: Cricinfo

==== Most career wickets ====
As of 11 August 2026

Wickets.	Player	Seasons
30	Nuwan Thushara (Sri Lanka)	2020-2022
18	Isuru Udana (Sri Lanka)	2021-2024
17	Eshan Malinga (Sri Lanka)	2026
17	Mohammad Amir (Pakistan)	2020-2021
16	Samit Patel (England)	2021
15	Akif Javed (Pakistan)	2026
14	Lakshan Sadakan (Sri Lanka)	2020-2022
13	Dhananjaya Lakshan (Sri Lanka)	2020-2021
13	Dwaine Pretorius (South Africa)	2024
12	Tabraiz Shamsi (South Africa)	2023

- Source: Cricinfo

==== Best figures in an innings ====
As of 11 August 2026

Figures	Player	Opposition	Venue	Date
5/13	Nuwan Thushara (Sri Lanka)	Jaffna Kings	Hambantota	19 December 2021
5/26	Mohammad Amir (Pakistan)	Colombo Kings	Hambantota	7 December 2020
4/20	Kasun Rajitha (Sri Lanka)	Jaffna Kings	Colombo	13 August 2023
4/20	Tabraiz Shamsi (South Africa)	Colombo Stars	Colombo	15 August 2023
4/23	Dwaine Pretorius (South Africa)	Jaffna Kings	Colombo	18 July 2024

- Source: Cricinfo

== Captains ==
No.	Player	From	To	Mat	Won	Lost	Tied	NR	Win%
1	(Pakistan) Shahid Afridi	2020	2020	3	0	3	0	0	0.00
2	(Sri Lanka) Bhanuka Rajapaksha	2020	2021	17	9	7	0	1	56.25
3	(Sri Lanka) Kusal Mendis	2022	2022	9	2	7	0	0	22.22
4	(Sri Lanka) Dasun Shanaka	2023	2026	20	10	10	0	0	50.00
5	(Sri Lanka) Niroshan Dickwella	2024	2024	10	5	4	1	0	55.55
6	(Sri Lanka) Charith Asalanka	2026	2026	1	1	0	0	0	100.00

Source: ESPNcricinfo, Last updated: 09 August 2026

== Team identity ==
=== Anthems ===
Year	Anthem	Artist(s)
2020	Duwanna Api Denne Hariya	Ravi Royster
2021	Gladiator Rasne	Ravi Royster, Dimi3, MoMo the Rapper
2024	Galle Kollo	Vinod Attanayake, Pasan Liyanage

=== Kit manufacturers and sponsors ===
For the 2022 season, 1xBat Sporting Lines were the team's title sponsor. In the 2023 season, Crickex.in became Galle's main title sponsor. BatJili, a premium sports apparel platform, joined the Galle Marvels as the principal sponsor for the 2024 season.

Year	Kit manufacturer	Shirt sponsor (front)	Shirt sponsor (back)	Chest sponsor	Sleeve sponsor
2020		Golootlo	NBP	PayPak	Jang Media Group, KFC, UnionPay
2021		Chiraag Online	PayPak, NBP	Pakistan International Airlines, NLB	KFC, Golootlo, UnionPay
2022		1xBet	MCB Bank	SY Capital Estates	UnionPay, PayPak, MCB Bank
2023		Crickex.in		Carnage	Visit Sri Lanka
2024	Moose Clothing	BatJili	—N/a	HEYVIP Blog	Green Electric
2026	Moose Clothing	Babu88 Sports	—N/a		Kasagala Group of Companies
