= Dwaine Pretorius =

South African cricketer

Personal information
- Born: 29 March 1989 (age 37); Randfontein, Transvaal Province, South Africa
- Batting: Right-handed
- Bowling: Right-arm medium-fast
- Role: Bowling all-rounder

International information
- National side: South Africa (2016–2022)
- Test debut (cap 341): 26 December 2019 v England
- Last Test: 24 January 2020 v England
- ODI debut (cap 119): 25 September 2016 v Ireland
- Last ODI: 24 July 2022 v England
- T20I debut (cap 71): 21 June 2017 v England
- Last T20I: 4 October 2022 v India

Domestic team information
- Years: Team
- 2010/11–present: North West
- 2011/12–2020/21: Lions
- 2018: Jozi Stars
- 2019: Northamptonshire
- 2019: Paarl Rocks
- 2022–2023: Chennai Super Kings
- 2022: Welsh Fire
- 2022: St Kitts and Nevis Patriots
- 2023: Durban's Super Giants
- 2023: Fortune Barishal
- 2023: Quetta Gladiators
- 2023-present: Guyana Amazon Warriors
- 2023-present: Durban's Super Giants

Career statistics
Competition	Test	ODI	T20I	FC
Matches	3	27	30	61
Runs scored	83	192	261	2,805
Batting average	13.83	16.00	21.75	35.50
100s/50s	0/0	0/1	0/1	5/16
Top score	37	50	77*	177
Balls bowled	480	1,144	504	9,351
Wickets	7	35	35	173
Bowling average	36.00	27.05	19.88	24.64
5 wickets in innings	0	0	1	6
10 wickets in match	0	0	0	1
Best bowling	2/26	4/36	5/17	6/38
Catches/stumpings	2/–	11/–	6/–	18/–
- Source: ESPNcricinfo, 1 January 2023

Dwaine Pretorius (born 29 March 1989) is a former South African international cricketer who currently plays in various T20 leagues around the globe and for North West in domestic cricket as a bowling all-rounder. He announced his retirement from international cricket on 9 January 2023.

== Domestic and T20 career ==
He was included in the North West cricket team squad for the 2015 Africa T20 Cup. In August 2017, he was named in Cape Town Knight Riders' squad for the first season of the T20 Global League. However, in October 2017, Cricket South Africa initially postponed the tournament until November 2018, with it being cancelled soon after.

In October 2018, he was named in Jozi Stars' squad for the first edition of the Mzansi Super League T20 tournament. In April 2019, Pretorius was signed by Northamptonshire to play in the 2019 t20 Blast tournament in England.

In July 2019, he was selected to play for the Edinburgh Rocks in the inaugural edition of the Euro T20 Slam cricket tournament. However, the following month the tournament was cancelled. In September 2019, he was named in the squad for the Paarl Rocks team for the 2019 Mzansi Super League tournament. In December 2019, he was drafted by the Pakistan Super League (PSL) franchise team Peshawar Zalmi as their silver Category pick at the 2020 PSL draft.

In April 2021, he was named in North West's squad, ahead of the 2021–22 cricket season in South Africa. In February 2022, he was bought by the Chennai Super Kings in the auction for the 2022 Indian Premier League tournament. In July 2022, he was signed by the Colombo Stars for the third edition of the Lanka Premier League.

== International career ==
Pretorius made his international debut for South Africa against Ireland in a One Day International on 25 September 2016; taking one for 19 with the ball and was not required to bat in South Africa's 206 run win.

In September 2016 Pretorius was added to South Africa's One Day International squad for their series against Australia after Chris Morris suffered a knee injury.

Pretorius made his second international appearance in the 3rd ODI against Australia. He took 0–42 off six overs and hit 15 off 20 balls as the team chased down 371 to beat Australia. Pretorius was also selected to play in the 4th ODI against Australia and claimed the wicket of George Bailey; returning figures of 1–33 from 7 overs. He was not required to bat in South Africa's innings and was not selected to play in the 5th ODI as South Africa white-washed Australia 5–0.

In November 2016 Pretorius was added to South Africa's Test squad for their series against Australia. He replaced Dale Steyn who suffered a shoulder injury during the first Test. In June 2017, he was named in South Africa's Twenty20 International (T20I) squad for their series against England. He made his T20I debut for South Africa against England on 21 June 2017. In April 2019, he was named in South Africa's squad for the 2019 Cricket World Cup. In December 2019, he was named in South Africa's Test squad for their series against England. He made his Test debut for South Africa, against England, on 26 December 2019. In March 2020, he was awarded with a national contract by Cricket South Africa ahead of the 2020–21 season.

On 13 February 2021, during the series against Pakistan, Pretorius took his first five-wicket haul in T20Is, with 5/17. These were also the best figures by a bowler for South Africa in a T20I match. In September 2021, Pretorius was named in South Africa's squad for the 2021 ICC Men's T20 World Cup.
