= Dambulla Sixers =

Dambulla based franchise cricket team of the Lanka Premier League

- Official logo of Dambulla Sixers
- League: Lanka Premier League

Personnel
- Captain: Dinesh Chandimal
- Coach: Rangana Herath
- Owner: Sequoia Consultants, Inc.

Team information
- City: Dambulla, Central Province, Sri Lanka
- Colours: Blue; Yellow
- Founded: 2020: Dambulla Viiking; 2021: Dambulla Giants; 2022: Dambulla Aura; 2024: Dambulla Sixers
- Home ground: Rangiri Dambulla International Stadium, Dambulla
- Capacity: 16,800

History
- LPL wins: 0
- Official website: dambullasixers.lk
Regular kit
Pink Game kit

Dambulla Sixers, previously known as Dambulla Aura, Dambulla Giants, Dambulla Viiking, and Dambulla Thunders is a franchise Twenty20 cricket team based in Dambulla, Sri Lanka, that competes in the Lanka Premier League (LPL).

In June 2021, Sri Lanka Cricket (SLC) terminated the franchise ahead of the 2021 Lanka Premier League, due to financial issues. In September 2021, the team changed their name to Dambulla Giants after changing owners. Then, prior to the 2022 season, Aura Lanka brought the franchise and changed its name to Dambulla Aura.

== Franchise history ==
=== 2024 season ===
In 2024, the team was purchased by Imperial Sports Group, who renamed it Dambulla Thunders. Tamim Rahman, a co-owner of Dambulla Thunders, a British national of Bangladeshi origin, was arrested at the Bandaranaike International Airport a day after the 2024 LPL player auction. The special investigating unit for preventing sports-related offences of the Ministry of Sports made the arrest. Following the arrest, LPL terminated its contract with Dambulla Thunders with immediate effect. The IPG Group, the organisers of LPL announced, the fifth edition of the league will continue as planned despite the events related to Dambulla Thunders. IPG further stated that the Dambulla franchise will participate in the league under new ownership. Incidentally, Viranjith Thambugala, chairman of Aura Lanka, the previous owner of Dambulla franchise, was arrested by Sri Lanka Police over allegations of financial fraud on the same day. At last, Dambulla franchise was bought by a Los Angeles based engineering consultant firm called Sequoia Consultants.

To promote breast cancer awareness and encourage self-examination, Dambulla Sixers played their match against Galle Marvels on July 14 wearing pink jerseys with a pink ribbon. Inspired by successful campaigns in other cricket-playing nations, the initiative aims to significantly impact cancer awareness in Sri Lanka. Galle Marvels also wore a special jersey that mixed pink with their usual neon green to support their program.

=== 2026 season ===
Before the 2026 LPL player draft, the Sixers signed Dinesh Chandimal, Dushmantha Chameera, Reeza Hendricks and Sahibzada Farhan as pre-draft signings.

== Current squad ==
- Sources:
- Players with international caps are listed in **bold**.

No.	Name	Nat.	Date of birth	Batting style	Bowling style	Year signed	Salary (US$)	Notes
Batters
51	**Sahibzada Farhan**	(Pakistan)	6 March 1996 (age 30)	Right handed	—N/a	2026	80,000	
17	**Reeza Hendricks**	(South Africa)	14 August 1989 (age 37)	Right handed	Right-arm off break	2026	60,000	
06	**Pavan Rathnayake**	(Sri Lanka)	24 August 2002 (age 24)	Right handed	Right-arm off break	2026	30,000	
65	Marques Ackerman	(South Africa)	1 March 1996 (age 30)	Left handed	Right-arm off break	2026	20,000	
Wicket-keepers
56	**Dinesh Chandimal**	(Sri Lanka)	18 November 1989 (age 36)	Right handed	—N/a	2026	80,000	**Captain**
48	**Niroshan Dickwella**	(Sri Lanka)	23 June 1993 (age 33)	Left handed	—N/a	2026	30,000	
All-Rounders
33	Gayana Weerasinghe	(Sri Lanka)	16 December 2004 (age 21)	Right handed	Right-arm medium fast	2026	10,000	
14	**Gulbadin Naib**	(Afghanistan)	4 June 1991 (age 35)	Right-handed	Right-arm medium fast	2026	20,000	
69	**Dhananjaya Lakshan**	(Sri Lanka)	5 October 1998 (age 28)	Left handed	Right-arm medium fast	2026	20,000	
25	**Ramesh Mendis**	(Sri Lanka)	7 July 1995 (age 31)	Right handed	Right-arm off break	2026	20,000	
2	**Sonal Dinusha**	(Sri Lanka)	4 December 2000 (age 25)	Left handed	Slow left arm Orthodox	2026	20,000	
24	**Sikandar Raza**	(Zimbabwe)	24 April 1986 (age 40)	Right handed	Right-arm off break	2026	50,000	Replacement for Fazalhaq Farooqi
29	Sachitha Jayathilake	(Sri Lanka)	24 February 1997 (age 29)	Right handed	Right-arm leg break	2026	20,000	
Spin bowlers
15	Vishwa Kumara	(Sri Lanka)	15 November 2004 (age 21)	Right handed	Slow left arm Orthodox	2026	10,000	
4	**Akila Dhananjaya**	(Sri Lanka)	4 October 1993 (age 33)	Right handed	Right-arm off break	2026	30,000	
61	**Maheesh Theekshana**	(Sri Lanka)	1 August 2000 (age 26)	Right handed	Right-arm off break	2026	50,000	
Pace bowlers
5	**Dushmantha Chameera**	(Sri Lanka)	11 January 1992 (age 34)	Right handed	Right-arm fast	2026	60,000	**Vice Captain**
74	**Mohammad Wasim**	(Pakistan)	25 August 2001 (age 25)	Right handed	Right-arm [fast medium]]	2026	30,000	
37	**Shadley van Schalkwyk**	(United States)	5 August 1988 (age 38)	Left handed	Right-arm medium	2026	15,000	

== Administration and support staff ==
Position	Name	Ref.
Head coach	(Sri Lanka) Rangana Herath	
Assistant coach	(Sri Lanka) Piyal Wijetunge	
Mentor	(Sri Lanka) Roshan Mahanama	
Batting coach	(Sri Lanka) Roshan Mahanama	
Fielding coach	(Sri Lanka) Ruvin Peiris	
Chief executive officer (CEO)	(Sri Lanka) Ashley Herath	
Digital insider	(Australia) Jake Jeakings	

=== History ===
Season	Head coach	Assistant coach
2020	Owais Shah	
2021	Stuart Law	Sampath Perera
2022	Mickey Arthur	Avishka Gunawardene
2023	Avishka Gunawardene	Upul Chandana
2024	Rangana Herath	
2026	Rangana Herath	Piyal Wijetunge

== Captains ==
No.	Player	From	To	Mat	Won	Lost	Tied	NR	Win%
1	Dasun Shanaka (Sri Lanka)	2020	2022	24	9	13	0	2	37.50
2	Niroshan Dickwella (Sri Lanka)	2021	2021	2	1	1	0	0	50.00
3	Sikandar Raza (Zimbabwe)	2022	2022	1	1	0	0	0	100.00
4	Kusal Mendis (Sri Lanka)	2023	2023	8	5	2	1	0	68.75
5	Dhananjaya de Silva (Sri Lanka)	2023	2023	2	2	0	0	0	100.00
6	Mohammad Nabi (Afghanistan)	2024	2024	8	3	4	1	0	37.50
7	Dinesh Chandimal (Sri Lanka)	2026	2026	7	1	5	0	1	16.66
8	Dushmantha Chameera (Sri Lanka)	2026	2026	1	1	0	0	0	100.00

As of 03 August 2026

== Seasons ==
Year	League standing	Final standing
2020	2nd out of 5	Playoffs
2021	4th out of 5	Playoffs
2022	5th out of 5	League Stage
2023	1st out of 5	Runners up
2024	5th out of 5	League stage
2026	5th out of 5	League stage

== Statistics ==
=== By season ===
Season	Pld	W	L	NR	Win%	Pos.	Summary	Most runs	Most wickets
2020	9	5	3	1	62.50	2/5	Playoffs	Dasun Shanaka (278)	Anwar Ali (9)
2021	10	4	5	1	44.44	4/5	Playoffs	Phil Salt (301)	Imran Tahir (15)
2022	8	2	6	0	25.00	5/5	League Stage	Jordan Cox (205)	Matthew Forde (7)
2023	10	7	3	0	70.00	1/5	Runners-up	Avishka Fernando (244)	Noor Ahmad (12)
2024	8	3	5	0	37.50	5/5	League Stage	Kusal Perera (296)	Dushan Hemantha (11)
2026	8	2	5	1	28.57	5/5	League Stage	Reeza Hendricks (294)	Dushmantha Chameera (12)
Total	53	23	27	3	46.00		0 Titles	Dasun Shanaka (544)	Nuwan Pradeep (18)

- Source: Cricinfo

=== Most runs ===
As of 03 August 2026

Runs	Player	Seasons
544	Dasun Shanaka (Sri Lanka)	2020–2022
531	Niroshan Dickwella (Sri Lanka)	2020–2026
519	Reeza Hendricks (South Africa)	2024-2026
506	Kusal Perera (Sri Lanka)	2023-2024
301	Phil Salt (England)	2021
244	Ramesh Mendis (Sri Lanka)	2020-2026
244	Avishka Fernando (Sri Lanka)	2023
237	Sadeera Samarawickrama (Sri Lanka)	2020-2023
227	Angelo Perera (Sri Lanka)	2020
225	Mark Chapman (New Zealand)	2024

- Source: Cricinfo

=== Highest individual score ===
As of 4 August 2026

Runs	Player	Opposition	Venue	Date
102*	Kusal Perera (Sri Lanka)	Jaffna Kings	Pallekele	3 July 2024
91*	Mark Chapman (New Zealand)	Kandy Falcons	Pallekele	1 July 2024
87*	Kusal Mendis (Sri Lanka)	Colombo Strikers	Pallekele	5 August 2023
87*	Reeza Hendricks (South Africa)	Kandy Royals	SSC Cricket Ground	18 July 2026
80	Shevon Daniel (Sri Lanka)	Galle Gladiators	Colombo	17 December 2022
80	Reeza Hendricks (South Africa)	Colombo Kaps	Pallekele	29 July 2026
80	Reeza Hendricks (South Africa)	Jaffna Kings	Dambulla	6 July 2024
80	Kusal Perera (Sri Lanka)	Colombo Strikers	Dambulla	7 July 2024

- Source: Cricinfo

=== Most wickets ===
As of 03 August 2026

Wickets	Player	Seasons
18	Nuwan Pradeep (Sri Lanka)	2021–2024
16	Dushan Hemantha (Sri Lanka)	2022–2024
15	Imran Tahir (South Africa)	2021
15	Noor Ahmad (Afghanistan)	2022–2023
15	Ramesh Mendis (Sri Lanka)	2020–2026
12	Dushmantha Chameera (Sri Lanka)	2026
10	Binura Fernando (Sri Lanka)	2023
10	Dhananjaya de Silva (Sri Lanka)	2023
09	Hayden Kerr (Australia)	2023
09	Anwar Ali (Pakistan)	2020

- Source: Cricinfo

==== Best figures in an innings ====
As of 05 August 2026

Figures	Player	Opposition	Venue	Date
5/55	Dushmantha Chameera (Sri Lanka)	Galle Gallants	Dambulla	26 July 2026
4/6	Dhananjaya De Silva (Sri Lanka)	B-Love Kandy	Colombo	14 August 2023
4/11	Matthew Forde (Cricket West Indies)	Galle Gladiators	Colombo	19 December 2022
4/36	Lahiru Kumara (Sri Lanka)	Colombo Stars	Hambantota	8 December 2022
3/14	Dushan Hemantha (Sri Lanka)	Kandy Falcons	Colombo	16 July 2024

- Source: Cricinfo

== Team identity ==
=== Logo ===
Dambulla Sixers
2024	since 2026

=== Anthem ===
Year	Anthem	Artist(s)
2021		Tony T, Rohitha Rajapaksa, Dinesh Kanagaratnam, Tehani Imara, Neo Navy
2022	Uthura Dakuna Tharaga Dinana	
2024	Awula Awula Abhimane	

=== Kit manufacturers and sponsors ===
In the inaugural season, Life Bottled Water, Big Brother, Goa King's, Planet Hollywood and Viiking Ventures became as team sponsors while Swarnavahini, Ran FM, E FM and Shree FM was the media partners. TigerExchange News became the team's main sponsor in the 2022 season. In 2023 season, Babu88 Sports became as the principal sponsor of the Dambulla franchise.

Year	Kit manufacturer	Shirt sponsor (front)	Shirt sponsor (back)	Chest branding	Sleeve branding
2020		Planet Hollywood	Goa King's	Life Bottled Water	Big Brother
2021		Hamro PLC		—N/a	i-view London, NLB, Lahore Country Club
2022		Tiger Exchange News		Aura Lanka	Tiger Exchange News, Aura Airlines
2023		Babu88 Sports	Kheloyar	Aura Airlines	Visit Sri Lanka
2024		MostPlay.news	Sequoia Consultants	Harriet	—N/a
2026		Dafa News	JAT Paints	Bairaha Farms	Flemmings, Harriet
