= 2021 Dambulla Giants season =

Dambulla based franchise cricket team in Sri Lanka

Dambulla Giants
2021 season
- Coach: Stuart Law
- Captain: Dasun Shanaka
- Tournament performance: Playoffs (3rd)
- Most runs: Phil Salt (301)
- Most wickets: Imran Tahir (15)

The Dambulla Giants (DG) is a franchise cricket team that competes in 2021 Lanka Premier League. The team is based in Dambulla, Central Province, Sri Lanka. In September 2021, Dambulla Viiking changed their name to Dambulla Giants after having new owners. The team was captained by Dasun Shanaka and coached by Stuart Law.

== Squad ==
- Players with international caps are listed in **bold**.
- Ages given as of 5 December 2021, the date the first match of the tournament was played

S/N	Name	Nationality	Date of birth (age)	Batting style	Bowling style	Notes
Batsman
24	**Dilshan Munaweera**	Sri Lanka	24 April 1989 (aged 32)	Right-handed	Right-arm off break	
92	**Sohaib Maqsood**	Pakistan	15 April 1987 (aged 34)	Right-handed	Right-arm off break	Overseas player
1	**Najibullah Zadran**	Afghanistan	18 February 1993 (aged 28)	Left-handed	Right-arm off break	Overseas player
	**Sacha De Alwis**	Sri Lanka	30 January 1992 (aged 29)	Left- handed	Slow left arm orthodox	
23	**Rilee Rossouw**	South Africa	9 October 1989 (aged 32)	Left- handed	Right-arm off break	Overseas player
All-rounders
7	**Dasun Shanaka**	Sri Lanka	9 September 1991 (aged 30)	Right-handed	Right-arm medium	Captain
25	**Ramesh Mendis**	Sri Lanka	7 July 1995 (aged 26)	Right-handed	Right-arm off break	
	Tharindu Ratnayake	Sri Lanka	18 April 1996 (aged 25)	Left-handed	Right-arm off break	
	Muditha Lakshan	Sri Lanka	20 December 2000 (aged 20)	Right-handed	Slow left arm orthodox	
	Sachitha Jayathilake	Sri Lanka	24 February 1997 (aged 24)	Right-handed	Right-arm leg break	
	Janith Liyanage	Sri Lanka	12 July 1995 (aged 26)	Right-handed	Right-arm medium-fast	
Wicket-keepers
48	**Niroshan Dickwella**	Sri Lanka	23 June 1993 (aged 28)	Left-handed		
	Lahiru Udara	Sri Lanka	27 November 1993 (aged 28)	Right-handed	–	
Spin bowlers
99	**Imran Tahir**	South Africa	27 March 1979 (aged 42)	Right-handed	Right-arm leg break	Overseas player
	Madushan Ravichandrakumar	Sri Lanka	23 December 1994 (aged 26)	Right-handed	Right-arm leg break	
	Chamikara Edirisinghe	Sri Lanka	4 April 1991 (aged 30)	Left-handed	Slow left arm orthodox	
Pace bowlers
29	**Chamika Karunaratne**	Sri Lanka	29 May 1996 (aged 25)	Right-handed	Right-arm medium-fast	
63	**Nuwan Pradeep**	Sri Lanka	19 October 1986 (aged 35)	Right-handed	Right-arm fast	
82	**Josh Little**	Ireland	1 November 1999 (aged 22)	Right-handed	Left-arm fast-medium	Overseas player
90	**Marchant de Lange**	South Africa	13 October 1990 (aged 31)	Right-handed	Right-arm fast	Overseas player
	Kalana Perera	Sri Lanka	28 July 2000 (aged 21)	Left-handed	Left-arm medium-fast	
	**Odean Smith**	West Indies	1 November 1996 (aged 25)	Right-handed	Right-arm medium	Overseas player

== Administration and support staff ==
Position	Name
Head coach	Stuart Law
Assistant coach	Sampath Perera
Fielding coach	Kaushalya Gajasinghe

== Teams and standings ==
=== League table ===
Pos	Team	Pld	W	L	NR	Pts	NRR
1	Jaffna Kings (C)	8	6	2	0	12	2.210
2	Galle Gladiators (R)	8	4	3	1	9	0.143
3	Colombo Stars (4th)	8	4	4	0	8	−0.571
4	Dambulla Giants (3rd)	8	3	4	1	7	−1.003
5	Kandy Warriors	8	2	6	0	4	−0.668

Source: ESPN Cricinfo
- The top four teams qualified for the playoffs
- Advanced to Qualifier 1
- Advanced to Eliminator

== League matches ==
Match 2
6 December 2021
15:00 (D/N)
Scorecard

Dambulla Giants; 190/7 (20 overs)	v	Kandy Warriors; 170/8 (20 overs)
Phil Salt 64 (27); Lahiru Kumara 3/34 (4 overs)		Rovman Powell 42 (21); Ramesh Mendis 3/21 (4 overs)

Dambulla Giants won by 20 runs
R. Premadasa Stadium, Colombo
Umpires: Keerthi Bandara and Raveendra Wimalasiri
Player of the match: Phil Salt (Dambulla Giants)

- Dambulla Giants won the toss and elected to bat.

Match 4
7 December 2021
15:00 (D/N)
Scorecard

Dambulla Giants; 110 (19.3 overs)	v	Jaffna Kings; 114/2 (12.3 overs)
Nuwanidu Fernando 23 (25); Wanindu Hasaranga 3/16 (4 overs)		Tom Kohler-Cadmore 45* (30); Imran Tahir 1/20 (4 overs)

Jaffna Kings won by 8 wickets
R. Premadasa Stadium, Colombo
Umpires: Kumar Dharmasena and Ravindra Kottahachchi
Player of the match: Maheesh Theekshana (Jaffna Kings)

- Dambulla Giants won the toss and elected to bat.

Match 6
8 December 2021
15:00 (D/N)
Scorecard

Dambulla Giants; 195/6 (20 overs)	v	Colombo Stars; 177 (18.5 overs)
Phil Salt 62 (34); Dushmantha Chameera 3/34 (4 overs)		Dinesh Chandimal 26 (16); Nuwan Pradeep 3/50 (4 overs)

Dambulla Giants won by 18 runs
R. Premadasa Stadium, Colombo
Umpires: Kumar Dharmasena and Rohitha Kottahachchi
Player of the match: Phil Salt (Dambulla Giants)

- Dambulla Giants won the toss and elected to bat.

Match 8
10 December 2021
15:00 (D/N)
Scorecard

Dambulla Giants; 159/7 (20 overs)	v	Galle Gladiators; 18/0 (1.2 overs)
Dasun Shanaka 37 (32); Nuwan Thushara 2/24 (3 overs)		Kusal Mendis 15* (5)

No result
R. Premadasa Stadium, Colombo
Umpires: Keerthi Bandara and Lyndon Hannibal

- Dambulla Giants won the toss and elected to bat.
- No further play was possible due to rain.

Match 11
11 December 2021
19:30 (N)
Scorecard

Dambulla Giants; 138/9 (20 overs)	v	Colombo Stars; 137/8 (20 overs)
Niroshan Dickwella 30 (16); Jeffrey Vandersay 3/25 (4 overs)		Dinesh Chandimal 65* (40); Tharindu Ratnayake 3/18 (4 overs)

Dambulla Giants won by 1 run
R. Premadasa Stadium, Colombo
Umpires: Hemantha Boteju and Raveendra Wimalasiri
Player of the match: Tharindu Ratnayake (Dambulla Giants)

- Dambulla Giants won the toss and elected to bat.

Match 14
13 December 2021
19:30 (N)
Scorecard

Dambulla Giants; 69 (14.1 overs)	v	Jaffna Kings; 71/3 (9.2 overs)
Phil Salt 23 (22); Chaturanga de Silva 4/16 (4 overs)		Wanindu Hasaranga 37 (18); Imran Tahir 2/21 (4 overs)

Jaffna Kings won by 7 wickets
R. Premadasa Stadium, Colombo
Umpires: Keerthi Bandara and Raveendra Wimalasiri
Player of the match: Chaturanga de Silva (Jaffna Kings)

- Jaffna Kings won the toss and elected to field.

Match 16
14 December 2021
19:30 (N)
Scorecard

Galle Gladiators; 134/7 (14 overs)	v	Dambulla Giants; 125/5 (14 overs)
Kusal Mendis 35 (17); Imran Tahir 3/20 (3 overs)		Janith Liyanage 51 (37); Samit Patel 2/24 (3 overs)

Galle Gladiators won by 9 runs
R. Premadasa Stadium, Colombo
Umpires: Ravindra Kottahachchi and Prageeth Rambukwella
Player of the match: Samit Patel (Galle Gladiators)

- Dambulla Giants won the toss and elected to field.
- The match was reduced to 14 overs per side due to rain.

Match 18
16 December 2021
19:30 (N)
Scorecard

Dambulla Giants; 130/9 (20 overs)	v	Kandy Warriors; 135/4 (19.2 overs)
Ramesh Mendis 41 (28); Binura Fernando 3/22 (4 overs)		Ravi Bopara 59* (50); Imran Tahir 2/17 (4 overs)

Kandy Warriors won by 6 wickets
R. Premadasa Stadium, Colombo
Umpires: Rohitha Kottahachchi and Raveendra Wimalasiri
Player of the match: Ravi Bopara (Kandy Warriors)

- Dambulla Giants won the toss and elected to bat.

== Playoffs ==
=== Eliminator ===
Match 21
19 December 2021
16:00 (D/N)
Scorecard

Colombo Stars; 145/6 (20 overs)	v	Dambulla Giants; 146/4 (18.5 overs)
Angelo Mathews 50* (34); Nuwan Pradeep 2/23 (4 overs)		Janith Liyanage 56* (47); Dushmantha Chameera 1/24 (4 overs)

Dambulla Giants won by 6 wickets
Mahinda Rajapaksa International Cricket Stadium, Hambantota
Umpires: Lyndon Hannibal and Raveendra Wimalasiri
Player of the match: Janith Liyanage (Dambulla Giants)

- Colombo Stars won the toss and elected to bat.

=== Qualifier 2 ===
Match 23
21 December 2021
19:30 (N)
Scorecard

Jaffna Kings; 210/4 (20 overs)	v	Dambulla Giants; 187/9 (20 overs)
Avishka Fernando 100 (64); Lahiru Samarakoon 2/30 (2 overs)		Chamika Karunaratne 75* (47); Jayden Seales 3/24 (4 overs)

Jaffna Kings won by 23 runs
Mahinda Rajapaksa International Cricket Stadium, Hambantota
Umpires: Lyndon Hannibal and Prageeth Rambukwella
Player of the match: Avishka Fernando (Jaffna Kings)

- Dambulla Giants won the toss and elected to field.
- Avishka Fernando (Jaffna Kings) scored his first century in Twenty20 cricket.

== Statistics ==
=== Most runs ===
Player	Matches	Runs	High score
Phil Salt	10	301	64
Chamika Karunaratne	10	156	75*
Najibullah Zadran	9	152	54
Niroshan Dickwella	10	151	37
Dasun Shanaka	8	139	38

- Source: ESPNcricinfo

=== Most wickets ===
Player	Matches	Wickets	Best bowling
Imran Tahir	10	15	3/20
Nuwan Pradeep	8	10	3/31
Ramesh Mendis	10	7	3/21
Tharindu Ratnayake	6	6	3/18
Chamika Karunaratne	10	5	2/46

- Source: ESPNcricinfo
