= 2021 Jaffna Kings season =

Overview of Jaffna Kings in 2021

Jaffna Kings
2021 season
- Coach: Thilina Kandamby
- Captain: Thisara Perera
- Tournament performance: Champions
- Most runs: Avishka Fernando (312)
- Most wickets: Maheesh Theekshana (16)

The Jaffna Kings (often abbreviated as JK) is a franchise cricket team which competes in 2021 Lanka Premier League (LPL). The team is based in Jaffna, Northern Province, Sri Lanka. In September 2021, Jaffna Stallions changed their name to Jaffna Kings having new owners (Lyca Group). The team was captained by Thisara Perera and coached by Thilina Kandamby. They were defending champions having won LPL 2020. In the final, they beat Galle Gladiators by 23 runs to win their second successive LPL title.

== Squad ==
- Players with international caps are listed in **bold**
- Ages given as of 5 December 2021, the date the first match of the tournament was played

No.	Name	Nationality	Date of birth (age)	Batting style	Bowling style	Notes
Batsman
28	**Avishka Fernando**	Sri Lanka	5 April 1998 (aged 23)	Right-handed	Right-arm medium-fast	
18	**Shoaib Malik**	Pakistan	1 February 1982 (aged 39)	Right-handed	Right-arm off break	Overseas player
44	**Upul Tharanga**	Sri Lanka	2 February 1985 (aged 36)	Left- handed	–	
32	Tom Kohler-Cadmore	England	19 August 1994 (aged 27)	Right-handed	Right-arm off break	Overseas player
10	**Ashen Bandara**	Sri Lanka	23 November 1998 (aged 23)	Right-handed	Right-arm leg break	
45	Ashan Randika	Sri Lanka	15 November 1993 (aged 28)	Left- handed	Right-arm medium	
N/A	Shammu Ashan	Sri Lanka	9 January 1998 (aged 23)	Right-handed	Right-arm off break	
All-rounders
1	**Thisara Perera**	Sri Lanka	3 April 1989 (aged 32)	Left-handed	Right-arm medium-fast	Captain
49	**Wanindu Hasaranga**	Sri Lanka	29 July 1997 (aged 24)	Right-handed	Right-arm leg break	
20	**Chaturanga de Silva**	Sri Lanka	17 January 1990 (aged 31)	Left-handed	Slow left-arm orthodox	
N/A	Theivendiram Dinoshan	Sri Lanka	26 March 2002 (aged 19)	Right-handed	Right-arm fast	
N/A	Rathnaraja Thanuradan	Sri Lanka		Right-handed	Right-arm medium	
Wicket-keepers
21	**Rahmanullah Gurbaz**	Afghanistan	28 November 2001 (aged 20)	Right-handed	–	Overseas player
N/A	Krishan Sanjula	Sri Lanka	30 September 1998 (aged 23)	Right-handed	–	
Spin Bowlers
21	**Maheesh Theekshana**	Sri Lanka	1 August 2000 (aged 21)	Right-handed	Right-arm off break	
12	**Praveen Jayawickrama**	Sri Lanka	30 September 1998 (aged 23)	Right-handed	Slow left-arm orthodox	
55	Vijayakanth Viyaskanth	Sri Lanka	5 December 2001 (aged 20)	Right-handed	Right-arm leg break	
Pace Bowlers
47	**Wahab Riaz**	Pakistan	28 June 1985 (aged 36)	Right-handed	Left-arm fast	Overseas player
56	**Usman Shinwari**	Pakistan	5 January 1994 (aged 27)	Right-handed	Left-arm fast medium	Overseas player
82	**Suranga Lakmal**	Sri Lanka	10 March 1987 (aged 34)	Right-handed	Right-arm fast medium	
33	**Jayden Seales**	West Indies	10 September 2001 (aged 20)	Left-handed	Right-arm medium	Overseas player
N/A	Chamika Gunasekara	Sri Lanka	25 November 1999 (aged 22)	Right-handed	Right-arm medium-fast	

== Season standings ==
=== Points table ===
Pos	Team	Pld	W	L	NR	Pts	NRR
1	Jaffna Kings (C)	8	6	2	0	12	2.210
2	Galle Gladiators (R)	8	4	3	1	9	0.143
3	Colombo Stars (4th)	8	4	4	0	8	−0.571
4	Dambulla Giants (3rd)	8	3	4	1	7	−1.003
5	Kandy Warriors	8	2	6	0	4	−0.668

Source: ESPN Cricinfo
- The top four teams qualified for the playoffs
- Advanced to Qualifier 1
- Advanced to Eliminator

== League stage ==
Match 1
5 December 2021
19:30 (N)
Scorecard

Galle Gladiators; 164/7 (20 overs)	v	Jaffna Kings; 110 (18.2 overs)
Bhanuka Rajapaksa 56 (31); Jayden Seales 3/23 (4 overs)		Wahab Riaz 27 (20); Samit Patel 3/21 (4 overs)

Gale Gladiators won by 54 runs
R. Premadasa Stadium, Colombo
Umpires: Kumar Dharmasena and Ruchira Palliyaguruge
Player of the match: Samit Patel (Galle Gladiators)

- Jaffna Kings won the toss and elected to field.

Match 4
7 December 2021
15:00 (D/N)
Scorecard

Dambulla Giants; 110 (19.3 overs)	v	Jaffna Kings; 114/2 (12.3 overs)
Nuwanidu Fernando 23 (25); Wanindu Hasaranga 3/16 (4 overs)		Tom Kohler-Cadmore 45* (30); Imran Tahir 1/20 (4 overs)

Jaffna Kings won by 8 wickets
R. Premadasa Stadium, Colombo
Umpires: Kumar Dharmasena and Ravindra Kottahachchi
Player of the match: Maheesh Theekshana (Jaffna Kings)

- Dambulla Giants won the toss and elected to bat.

Match 7
8 December 2021
19:30 (N)
Scorecard

Jaffna Kings; 181/6 (14 overs)	v	Kandy Warriors; 166/5 (14 overs)
Thisara Perera 53 (21); Shiraz Ahmed 3/22 (3 overs)		Rovman Powell 61 (19); Jayden Seales 2/40 (3 overs)

Jaffna Kings won by 14 runs (DLS method)
R. Premadasa Stadium, Colombo
Umpires: Asanga Jayasooriya and Prageeth Rambukwella
Player of the match: Suranga Lakmal (Jaffna Kings)

- Kandy Warriors won the toss and elected to field.
- Rain stopped play during Jaffna Kings innings. Kandy Warriors were set a revised target of 181 runs from 14 overs.
- Shiraz Ahmed (Kandy Warriors) made his T20 debut.

Match 9
10 December 2021
19:30 (N)
Scorecard

Jaffna Kings; 207/6 (18 overs)	v	Colombo Stars; 114 (15.5 overs)
Thisara Perera 57* (23); Seekkuge Prasanna 3/31 (4 overs)		Ashan Priyanjan 35 (25); Maheesh Theekshana 4/25 (4 overs)

Jaffna Kings won by 93 runs
R. Premadasa Stadium, Colombo
Umpires: Deepal Gunawardene and Ruchira Palliyaguruge
Player of the match: Thisara Perera (Jaffna Kings)

- Colombo Stars won the toss and elected to field.
- The match was reduced to 18 overs per side due to rain.

Match 12
12 December 2021
15:00 (D/N)
Scorecard

Kandy Warriors; 94/2 (12.2 overs)	v	Jaffna Kings; 95/3 (8.4 overs)
Charith Asalanka 44* (34); Shoaib Malik 1/19 (3 overs)		Thisara Perera 29* (13); Binura Fernando 1/15 (1.4 overs)

Jaffna Kings won by 7 wickets (DLS method)
R. Premadasa Stadium, Colombo
Umpires: Lyndon Hannibal and Rohitha Kottahachchi
Player of the match: Shoaib Malik (Jaffna Kings)

- Jaffna Kings won the toss and elected to field.
- Rain stopped play during Kandy Warriors innings. Jaffna Kings were set a revised target of 95 runs from 10 overs.

Match 14
13 December 2021
19:30 (N)
Scorecard

Dambulla Giants; 69 (14.1 overs)	v	Jaffna Kings; 71/3 (9.2 overs)
Phil Salt 23 (22); Chaturanga de Silva 4/16 (4 overs)		Wanindu Hasaranga 37 (18); Imran Tahir 2/21 (4 overs)

Jaffna Kings won by 7 wickets
R. Premadasa Stadium, Colombo
Umpires: Keerthi Bandara and Raveendra Wimalasiri
Player of the match: Chaturanga de Silva (Jaffna Kings)

- Jaffna Kings won the toss and elected to field.

Match 17
16 December 2021
15:00 (D/N)
Scorecard

Jaffna Kings; 193/5 (20 overs)	v	Colombo Stars; 91 (15.5 overs)
Tom Kohler-Cadmore 92 (55); Naveen-ul-Haq 3/27 (4 overs)		Tom Banton 30 (33); Jayden Seales 4/13 (2.5 overs)

Jaffna Kings won by 102 runs
R. Premadasa Stadium, Colombo
Umpires: Hemantha Boteju and Prageeth Rambukwella
Player of the match: Tom Kohler-Cadmore (Jaffna Kings)

- Jaffna Kings won the toss and elected to bat.

Match 19
17 December 2021
15:00 (D/N)
Scorecard

Galle Gladiators; 129/8 (20 overs)	v	Jaffna Kings; 109 (18.3 overs)
Bhanuka Rajapaksa 23 (25); Praveen Jayawickrama 2/13 (3 overs)		Shoaib Malik 23 (27); Noor Ahmad 2/12 (4 overs)

Galle Gladiators won by 20 runs
R. Premadasa Stadium, Colombo
Umpires: Asanga Jayasooriya and Prageeth Rambukwella
Player of the match: Bhanuka Rajapaksa (Galle Gladiators)

- Galle Gladiators won the toss and elected to bat.

== Playoffs ==
=== Qualifier 1 ===
Match 22
19 December 2021
20:30 (N)
Scorecard

Galle Gladiators; 188/5 (20 overs)	v	Jaffna Kings; 124 (16.5 overs)
Kusal Mendis 85 (53); Thisara Perera 2/36 (4 overs)		Rahmanullah Gurbaz 59 (37); Nuwan Thushara 5/13 (3.5 overs)

Galle Gladiators won by 64 Runs
Mahinda Rajapaksa International Cricket Stadium, Hambantota
Umpires: Ruchira Palliyaguruge and Prageeth Rambukwella
Player of the match: Kusal Mendis (Galle Gladiators)

- Jaffna Kings won the toss and elected to field.

=== Qualifier 2 ===
Match 23
21 December 2021
19:30 (N)
Scorecard

Jaffna Kings; 210/4 (20 overs)	v	Dambulla Giants; 187/9 (20 overs)
Avishka Fernando 100 (64); Lahiru Samarakoon 2/30 (2 overs)		Chamika Karunaratne 75* (47); Jayden Seales 3/24 (4 overs)

Jaffna Kings won by 23 runs
Mahinda Rajapaksa International Cricket Stadium, Hambantota
Umpires: Lyndon Hannibal and Prageeth Rambukwella
Player of the match: Avishka Fernando (Jaffna Kings)

- Dambulla Giants won the toss and elected to field.
- Avishka Fernando (Jaffna Kings) scored his first century in Twenty20 cricket.

=== Final ===
Match 24
23 December 2021
19:30 (N)
Scorecard

Jaffna Kings; 201/3 (20 overs)	v	Galle Gladiators; 178/9 (20 overs)
Avishka Fernando 63 (41); Samit Patel 1/32 (4 overs)		Danushka Gunathilaka 54 (21); Chaturanga de Silva 2/15 (3 overs)

Jaffna Kings won by 23 runs
Mahinda Rajapaksa International Cricket Stadium, Hambantota
Umpires: Lyndon Hannibal and Raveendra Wimalasiri
Player of the match: Avishka Fernando (Jaffna Kings)

- Jaffna Kings won the toss and elected to bat.

== Statistics ==
=== Most runs ===
Player	Matches	Runs	High score
Avishka Fernando	10	312	100
Tom Kohler-Cadmore	11	296	92
Rahmanullah Gurbaz	8	207	70
Thisara Perera	11	190	57*
Shoaib Malik	10	164	44

- Source: ESPNcricinfo

=== Most wickets ===
Player	Matches	Wickets	Best bowling
Maheesh Theekshana	10	16	4/25
Jayden Seales	7	15	4/13
Wanindu Hasaranga	10	11	3/16
Wahab Riaz	5	9	4/26
Chaturanga de Silva	9	7	4/16

- Source: ESPNcricinfo
