= 2021 Kandy Warriors season =

Kandy based franchise cricket team in Sri Lanka

Kandy Warriors
2021 season
- Coach: Lalchand Rajput
- Captain: Angelo Perera
- Tournament performance: League stage (5th)
- Most runs: Kennar Lewis (168)
- Most wickets: Nimesh Vimukthi (10)

The Kandy Warriors (abbreviated as KW) is a franchise cricket team which competes in 2021 Lanka Premier League. The team is based in Kandy, Central Province, Sri Lanka. In October 2021, Kandy Tuskers changed their name to Kandy Warriors after announced as having new owners. The team was captained by Angelo Perera and coached by Lalchand Rajput.

== Squad ==
- Players with international caps are listed in **bold**
- Ages given as of 5 December 2021, the date the first match was played in the tournament

No.	Name	Nationality	Date of birth (age)	Batting style	Bowling style	Notes
Batsman
72	**Charith Asalanka**	Sri Lanka	29 June 1997 (aged 24)	Left-handed	Right-arm off break	Vice Captain
19	**Ahmed Shehzad**	Pakistan	23 November 1991 (aged 30)	Right-handed	Right-arm leg break	Overseas player
All-rounders
23	**Angelo Perera**	Sri Lanka	23 February 1990 (aged 31)	Right-handed	Slow left arm orthodox	Captain
52	**Rovman Powell**	West Indies	23 July 1993 (aged 28)	Right-handed	Right-arm fast-medium	Overseas player
84	**Kamindu Mendis**	Sri Lanka	30 September 1998 (aged 23)	Left-handed	Ambidextrous off break	
14	**Asela Gunaratne**	Sri Lanka	8 January 1986 (aged 35)	Right-handed	Right-arm medium	
57	**Milinda Siriwardana**	Sri Lanka	4 December 1985 (aged 36)	Left-handed	Slow left arm orthodox	
11	Ishan Jayaratne	Sri Lanka	26 June 1989 (aged 32)	Right-handed	Right-arm fast-medium	
N/A	Tillakaratne Sampath	Sri Lanka	23 June 1982 (aged 39)	Right-handed	Right-arm off break	
N/A	Ayana Siriwardhana	Sri Lanka	8 April 1999 (aged 22)	Right-handed	Right-arm off break	
N/A	Nimesh Vimukthi	Sri Lanka	7 May 1997 (aged 24)	Left-handed	Slow left arm orthodox	
N/A	Shashika Dulshan	Sri Lanka	4 May 2000 (aged 21)	Left-handed	Slow left arm orthodox	
N/A	Kalhara Senarathne	Sri Lanka	24 August 2000 (aged 21)	Left-handed	Right-arm off break	
Wicket-keepers
15	**Minod Bhanuka**	Sri Lanka	29 April 1995 (aged 26)	Left-handed	—	
69	Kennar Lewis	West Indies	18 August 1991 (aged 30)	Right-handed	—	Overseas player
38	**Devon Thomas**	West Indies	12 November 1989 (aged 32)	Right-handed	Right-arm medium	Overseas player
27	Kamil Mishara	Sri Lanka	24 April 2001 (aged 20)	Left-handed	Right-arm off break	
Spin bowlers
N/A	Sachindu Colombage	Sri Lanka	21 February 1998 (aged 23)	Right-handed	Right-arm leg break	
Pace bowlers
8	**Lahiru Kumara**	Sri Lanka	13 February 1997 (aged 24)	Left-handed	Right-arm fast	
71	**Binura Fernando**	Sri Lanka	12 July 1995 (aged 26)	Right-handed	Left-arm medium fast	
4	**Al-Amin Hossain**	Bangladesh	1 January 1990 (aged 31)	Right-handed	Right-arm medium-fast	Overseas player
N/A	Shiraz Ahmed	United Arab Emirates	22 August 1991 (aged 30)	Right-handed	Left-arm medium fast	Overseas player

== Administration and support staff ==
Position	Name
Manager	Shyam Impett
Director of Cricket	Atul Wassan
Head coach	Lalchand Rajput
Assistant coach	Ruvin Peiris

== Season standings ==
=== League table ===
Pos	Team	Pld	W	L	NR	Pts	NRR
1	Jaffna Kings (C)	8	6	2	0	12	2.210
2	Galle Gladiators (R)	8	4	3	1	9	0.143
3	Colombo Stars (4th)	8	4	4	0	8	−0.571
4	Dambulla Giants (3rd)	8	3	4	1	7	−1.003
5	Kandy Warriors	8	2	6	0	4	−0.668

Source: ESPN Cricinfo
- The top four teams qualified for the playoffs
- Advanced to Qualifier 1
- Advanced to Eliminator

== League stage ==
Match 2
6 December 2021
15:00
Scorecard

Dambulla Giants; 190/7 (20 overs)	v	Kandy Warriors; 170/8 (20 overs)
Phil Salt 64 (27); Lahiru Kumara 3/34 (4 overs)		Rovman Powell 42 (21); Ramesh Mendis 3/21 (4 overs)

Dambulla Giants won by 20 runs
R. Premadasa Stadium, Colombo
Umpires: Keerthi Bandara and Raveendra Wimalasiri
Player of the match: Phil Salt (Dambulla Giants)

- Dambulla Giants won the toss and elected to bat.

Match 5
7 December 2021
19:30 (N)
Scorecard

Kandy Warriors; 143/6 (20 overs)	v	Galle Gladiators; 147/6 (19.2 overs)
Ahmed Shehzad 56 (51); Samit Patel 3/13 (4 overs)		Danushka Gunathilaka 45 (33); Sachindu Colombage 3/20 (4 overs)

Galle Gladiators won by 4 wickets
R. Premadasa Stadium, Colombo
Umpires: Hemantha Boteju and Kumar Dharmasena
Player of the match: Dhananjaya Lakshan (Galle Gladiators)

- Kandy Warriors won the toss and elected to bat.

Match 7
8 December 2021
19:30 (N)
Scorecard

Jaffna Kings; 181/6 (14 overs)	v	Kandy Warriors; 166/5 (14 overs)
Thisara Perera 53 (21); Shiraz Ahmed 3/22 (3 overs)		Rovman Powell 61 (19); Jayden Seales 2/40 (3 overs)

Jaffna Kings won by 14 runs (DLS method)
R. Premadasa Stadium, Colombo
Umpires: Asanga Jayasooriya and Prageeth Rambukwella
Player of the match: Suranga Lakmal (Jaffna Kings)

- Kandy Warriors won the toss and elected to field.
- Rain stopped play during Jaffna Kings innings. Kandy Warriors were set a revised target of 181 runs from 14 overs.
- Shiraz Ahmed (Kandy Warriors) made his T20 debut.

Match 10
11 December 2021
15:00 (D/N)
Scorecard

Galle Gladiators; 127/7 (20 overs)	v	Kandy Warriors; 131/5 (18.4 overs)
Kusal Mendis 44 (34); Kamindu Mendis 3/25 (4 overs)		Ravi Bopara 34* (39); Samit Patel 2/20 (4 overs)

Kandy Warriors won by 5 wickets
R. Premadasa Stadium, Colombo
Umpires: Ravindra Kottahachchi and Prageeth Rambukwella
Player of the match: Ravi Bopara (Kandy Warriors)

- Galle Gladiators won the toss and elected to bat.

Match 12
12 December 2021
15:00 (D/N)
Scorecard

Kandy Warriors; 94/2 (12.2 overs)	v	Jaffna Kings; 95/3 (8.4 overs)
Charith Asalanka 44* (34); Shoaib Malik 1/19 (3 overs)		Thisara Perera 29* (13); Binura Fernando 1/15 (1.4 overs)

Jaffna Kings won by 7 wickets (DLS method)
R. Premadasa Stadium, Colombo
Umpires: Lyndon Hannibal and Rohitha Kottahachchi
Player of the match: Shoaib Malik (Jaffna Kings)

- Jaffna Kings won the toss and elected to field.
- Rain stopped play during Kandy Warriors innings. Jaffna Kings were set a revised target of 95 runs from 10 overs.

Match 15
14 December 2021
15:00 (D/N)
Scorecard

Kandy Warriors; 146/9 (20 overs)	v	Colombo Stars; 159/5 (19.4 overs)
Kennar Lewis 62 (44); Dushmantha Chameera 4/35 (4 overs)		Dinesh Chandimal 44 (27); Nimesh Vimukthi 2/11 (4 overs)

Colombo Stars won by 5 wickets
R. Premadasa Stadium, Colombo
Umpires: Deepal Gunawardene and Lyndon Hannibal
Player of the match: Seekkuge Prasanna (Colombo Stars)

- Colombo Stars won the toss and elected to field.

Match 18
16 December 2021
19:30 (N)
Scorecard

Dambulla Giants; 130/9 (20 overs)	v	Kandy Warriors; 135/4 (19.2 overs)
Ramesh Mendis 41 (28); Binura Fernando 3/22 (4 overs)		Ravi Bopara 59* (50); Imran Tahir 2/17 (4 overs)

Kandy Warriors won by 6 wickets
R. Premadasa Stadium, Colombo
Umpires: Rohitha Kottahachchi and Raveendra Wimalasiri
Player of the match: Ravi Bopara (Kandy Warriors)

- Dambulla Giants won the toss and elected to bat.

Match 20
17 December 2021
19:30 (N)
Scorecard

Colombo Stars; 182/6 (20 overs)	v	Kandy Warriors; 124 (17 overs)
Kusal Perera 58 (38); Nimesh Vimukthi 3/24 (4 overs)		Ravi Bopara 47 (31); Jeffrey Vandersay 6/25 (4 overs)

Colombo Stars won by 58 runs
R. Premadasa Stadium, Colombo
Umpires: Keerthi Bandara and Lyndon Hannibal
Player of the match: Jeffrey Vandersay (Colombo Stars)

- Kandy Warriors won the toss and elected to field.

== Statistics ==
=== Most runs ===
Player	Matches	Runs	High score
Kennar Lewis	6	168	62
Charith Asalanka	8	164	44*
Ravi Bopara	5	142	59*
Rovman Powell	3	104	61
Kamindu Mendis	8	88	32

- Source: ESPNcricinfo

=== Most wickets ===
Player	Matches	Wickets	Best bowling
Nimesh Vimukthi	6	10	3/24
Sachindu Colombage	7	7	3/20
Al-Amin Hossain	6	7	3/32
Shiraz Ahmed	5	6	3/22
Kamindu Mendis	8	6	3/25

- Source: ESPNcricinfo
