= 2021 Colombo Stars season =

Colombo based franchise cricket team in Sri Lanka

Colombo Stars
2021 season
- Coach: Ruwan Kalpage
- Captain: Dhananjaya de Silva (4 matches); Angelo Mathews
- Tournament performance: Eliminator (4th)
- Most runs: Dinesh Chandimal (277)
- Most wickets: Seekkuge Prasanna (13)

The Colombo Stars (abbreviated as CS) is a franchise cricket team which competes in 2021 Lanka Premier League. The team is based in Colombo, Western Province, Sri Lanka. In November 2021, the team changed their name to Colombo Stars after changing owners. The team was captained by Dhananjaya de Silva for few initial games as an acting captain until Angelo Mathews recover and coached by Ruwan Kalpage.

== Squad ==
- Players with international caps are listed in **bold**.
- Ages given as of 5 December 2021, the date the first match was played in the tournament

No.	Name	Nationality	Date of birth (age)	Batting style	Bowling style	Notes
Batsman
18	**Pathum Nissanka**	Sri Lanka	18 May 1998 (aged 23)	Right-handed	—	
3	**Ashan Priyanjan**	Sri Lanka	14 August 1989 (aged 32)	Right-handed	Right-arm off break	
50	**Sherfane Rutherford**	West Indies	15 August 1998 (aged 23)	Left-handed	Right-arm fast-medium	Overseas player
All-rounders
69	**Angelo Mathews**	Sri Lanka	2 June 1987 (aged 34)	Right-handed	Right-arm medium	Captain
75	**Dhananjaya de Silva**	Sri Lanka	6 September 1991 (aged 30)	Right-handed	Right-arm off break	
96	**David Wiese**	Namibia	18 May 1985 (aged 36)	Right-handed	Right-arm medium-fast	Overseas player
41	**Seekkuge Prasanna**	Sri Lanka	27 June 1985 (aged 36)	Right-handed	Right-arm leg break	
84	**Keemo Paul**	West Indies	21 February 1998 (aged 23)	Right-handed	Right-arm fast-medium	Overseas player
27	**Thikshila de Silva**	Sri Lanka	16 December 1993 (aged 27)	Left-handed	Right-arm fast-medium	
	Jehan Daniel	Sri Lanka	13 April 1999 (aged 22)	Right-handed	Right-arm medium-fast	
	Himesh Ramanayake	Sri Lanka	5 October 1997 (aged 24)	Right-handed	Right-arm medium-fast	
	Ravindu Fernando	Sri Lanka	3 November 1999 (aged 22)	Right-handed	Right-arm off break	
Wicket-keepers
55	**Kusal Perera**	Sri Lanka	17 August 1990 (aged 31)	Left-handed	Right-arm medium	
18	**Tom Banton**	England	11 November 1998 (age 27)	Right-handed	—	Overseas player
56	**Dinesh Chandimal**	Sri Lanka	18 November 1989 (aged 32)	Right-handed	Right-arm off break	
Spin bowlers
85	**Lakshan Sandakan**	Sri Lanka	10 June 1991 (aged 30)	Right-handed	Left-arm unorthodox spin	
4	**Akila Dananjaya**	Sri Lanka	4 October 1993 (aged 28)	Right-handed	Right-arm off break	
46	**Jeffrey Vandersay**	Sri Lanka	5 February 1990 (aged 31)	Right-handed	Right-arm leg break	
Pace bowlers
5	**Dushmantha Chameera**	Sri Lanka	11 January 1992 (aged 29)	Right-handed	Right-arm fast	
14	**Ravi Rampaul**	West Indies	15 October 1984 (aged 37)	Left-handed	Right-arm fast	Overseas player
78	**Naveen-ul-Haq**	Afghanistan	23 September 1999 (aged 22)	Right-handed	Right-arm medium-fast	Overseas player
	Shiran Fernando	Sri Lanka	4 May 1993 (aged 28)	Right-handed	Right-arm medium-fast	

== Season standings ==
=== Points table ===
Pos	Team	Pld	W	L	NR	Pts	NRR
1	Jaffna Kings (C)	8	6	2	0	12	2.210
2	Galle Gladiators (R)	8	4	3	1	9	0.143
3	Colombo Stars (4th)	8	4	4	0	8	−0.571
4	Dambulla Giants (3rd)	8	3	4	1	7	−1.003
5	Kandy Warriors	8	2	6	0	4	−0.668

Source: ESPN Cricinfo
- The top four teams qualified for the playoffs
- Advanced to Qualifier 1
- Advanced to Eliminator

== League matches ==
Match 3
6 December 2021
19:30 (N)
Scorecard

Galle Gladiators; 116/8 (20 overs)	v	Colombo Stars; 117/6 (17.3 overs)
Ben Dunk 38 (25); Dhananjaya de Silva 2/18 (4 overs)		Dinesh Chandimal 26* (27); Nuwan Thushara 2/26 (2.3 overs)

Colombo Stars won by 4 wickets
R. Premadasa Stadium, Colombo
Umpires: Kumar Dharmasena and Deepal Gunawardene
Player of the match: Dhananjaya de Silva (Colombo Stars)

- Galle Gladiators won the toss and elected to bat.

Match 6
8 December 2021
15:00 (D/N)
Scorecard

Dambulla Giants; 195/6 (20 overs)	v	Colombo Stars; 177 (18.5 overs)
Phil Salt 62 (34); Dushmantha Chameera 3/34 (4 overs)		Dinesh Chandimal 26 (16); Nuwan Pradeep 3/50 (4 overs)

Dambulla Giants won by 18 runs
R. Premadasa Stadium, Colombo
Umpires: Kumar Dharmasena and Rohitha Kottahachchi
Player of the match: Phil Salt (Dambulla Giants)

- Dambulla Giants won the toss and elected to bat.

Match 9
10 December 2021
19:30 (N)
Scorecard

Jaffna Kings; 207/6 (18 overs)	v	Colombo Stars; 114 (15.5 overs)
Thisara Perera 57* (23); Seekkuge Prasanna 3/31 (4 overs)		Ashan Priyanjan 35 (25); Maheesh Theekshana 4/25 (4 overs)

Jaffna Kings won by 93 runs
R. Premadasa Stadium, Colombo
Umpires: Deepal Gunawardene and Ruchira Palliyaguruge
Player of the match: Thisara Perera (Jaffna Kings)

- Colombo Stars won the toss and elected to field.
- The match was reduced to 18 overs per side due to rain.

Match 11
11 December 2021
19:30 (N)
Scorecard

Dambulla Giants; 138/9 (20 overs)	v	Colombo Stars; 137/8 (20 overs)
Niroshan Dickwella 30 (16); Jeffrey Vandersay 3/25 (4 overs)		Dinesh Chandimal 65* (40); Tharindu Ratnayake 3/18 (4 overs)

Dambulla Giants won by 1 run
R. Premadasa Stadium, Colombo
Umpires: Hemantha Boteju and Raveendra Wimalasiri
Player of the match: Tharindu Ratnayake (Dambulla Giants)

- Dambulla Giants won the toss and elected to bat.

Match 13
12 December 2021
19:30 (N)
Scorecard

Colombo Stars; 162/7 (18 overs)	v	Galle Gladiators; 121 (16.5 overs)
Angelo Mathews 73 (57); Dhananjaya Lakshan 2/22 (2 overs)		Kusal Mendis 64 (39); Naveen-ul-Haq 3/27 (3.5 overs)

Colombo Stars won by 41 runs
R. Premadasa Stadium, Colombo
Umpires: Asanga Jayasooriya and Raveendra Wimalasiri
Player of the match: Dinesh Chandimal (Colombo Stars)

- Colombo Stars won the toss and elected to bat.
- The match was reduced to 18 overs per side due to rain.

Match 15
14 December 2021
15:00 (D/N)
Scorecard

Kandy Warriors; 146/9 (20 overs)	v	Colombo Stars; 159/5 (19.4 overs)
Kennar Lewis 62 (44); Dushmantha Chameera 4/35 (4 overs)		Dinesh Chandimal 44 (27); Nimesh Vimukthi 2/11 (4 overs)

Colombo Stars won by 5 wickets
R. Premadasa Stadium, Colombo
Umpires: Deepal Gunawardene and Lyndon Hannibal
Player of the match: Seekkuge Prasanna (Colombo Stars)

- Colombo Stars won the toss and elected to field.

Match 17
16 December 2021
15:00 (D/N)
Scorecard

Jaffna Kings; 193/5 (20 overs)	v	Colombo Stars; 91 (15.5 overs)
Tom Kohler-Cadmore 92 (55); Naveen-ul-Haq 3/27 (4 overs)		Tom Banton 30 (33); Jayden Seales 4/13 (2.5 overs)

Jaffna Kings won by 102 runs
R. Premadasa Stadium, Colombo
Umpires: Hemantha Boteju and Prageeth Rambukwella
Player of the match: Tom Kohler-Cadmore (Jaffna Kings)

- Jaffna Kings won the toss and elected to bat.

Match 20
17 December 2021
19:30 (N)
Scorecard

Colombo Stars; 182/6 (20 overs)	v	Kandy Warriors; 124 (17 overs)
Kusal Perera 58 (38); Nimesh Vimukthi 3/24 (4 overs)		Ravi Bopara 47 (31); Jeffrey Vandersay 6/25 (4 overs)

Colombo Stars won by 58 runs
R. Premadasa Stadium, Colombo
Umpires: Keerthi Bandara and Lyndon Hannibal
Player of the match: Jeffrey Vandersay (Colombo Stars)

- Kandy Warriors won the toss and elected to field.

== Playoffs ==
=== Eliminator ===
Match 21
19 December 2021
16:00 (D/N)
Scorecard

Colombo Stars; 145/6 (20 overs)	v	Dambulla Giants; 146/4 (18.5 overs)
Angelo Mathews 50* (34); Nuwan Pradeep 2/23 (4 overs)		Janith Liyanage 56* (47); Dushmantha Chameera 1/24 (4 overs)

Dambulla Giants won by 6 wickets
Mahinda Rajapaksa International Cricket Stadium, Hambantota
Umpires: Lyndon Hannibal and Raveendra Wimalasiri
Player of the match: Janith Liyanage (Dambulla Giants)

- Colombo Stars won the toss and elected to bat.

== Statistics ==
=== Most runs ===
Player	Matches	Runs	High score
Dinesh Chandimal	9	277	65*
Angelo Mathews	5	191	73
Dhananjaya de Silva	9	147	40
Tom Banton	8	109	30
Kusal Perera	7	96	58

- Source: ESPNcricinfo

=== Most wickets ===
Player	Matches	Wickets	Best bowling
Seekkuge Prasanna	8	13	3/31
Dushmantha Chameera	9	13	4/35
Jeffrey Vandersay	4	11	6/25
Naveen-ul-Haq	9	10	3/27
Ravi Rampaul	4	6	3/27

- Source: ESPNcricinfo
