= 2021 Galle Gladiators season =

Galle based franchise cricket team in Sri Lanka

Galle Gladiators
2021 season
- Coach: Umar Gul
- Captain: Bhanuka Rajapaksa
- Tournament performance: Runner up
- Most runs: Kusal Mendis (327)
- Most wickets: Samit Patel (16)

The Galle Gladiators (GG) is the franchise cricket team based in Galle, Southern Province, Sri Lanka which has been playing in the Lanka Premier League (LPL) since the first edition of the tournament in 2020. They were one of the five teams to compete in the 2021 Lanka Premier League. The team was captained by Bhanuka Rajapaksa and coached by Umar Gul.

== Squad ==
- Players with international caps are listed in **bold**.
- Ages given as of 5 December 2021, the date the first match was played in the tournament

No.	Name	Nationality	Date of birth (age)	Batting style	Bowling style	Notes
Batsman
24	**Bhanuka Rajapaksa**	Sri Lanka	24 October 1991 (aged 30)	Left- handed	Right-arm medium	Captain
70	**Danushka Gunathilaka**	Sri Lanka	17 March 1991 (aged 30)	Left-handed	Right-arm off break	
	Sahan Arachchige	Sri Lanka	13 May 1996 (aged 25)	Left-handed	Right-arm off break	
	Angelo Jayasinghe	Sri Lanka	25 January 1993 (aged 28)	Right-handed	Right-arm leg break	
All-rounders
8	**Mohammad Hafeez**	Pakistan	17 October 1980 (aged 41)	Right-handed	Right-arm off break	Overseas player
17	**Isuru Udana**	Sri Lanka	17 April 1988 (aged 33)	Right-handed	Left-arm medium	
29	**Samit Patel**	England	30 November 1984 (aged 37)	Right-handed	Slow left arm orthodox	Overseas player
18	**Dhananjaya Lakshan**	Sri Lanka	5 October 1998 (aged 23)	Left-handed	Right-arm medium-fast	
48	**Anwar Ali**	Pakistan	25 November 1987 (aged 34)	Right-handed	Right-arm fast-medium	Overseas player
98	**Lahiru Madushanka**	Sri Lanka	12 September 1992 (aged 29)	Right-handed	Right-arm fast-medium	
88	Pulina Tharanga	Sri Lanka	23 January 1993 (aged 28)	Right-handed	Right-arm leg break	
36	Kevin Koththigoda	Sri Lanka	4 October 1998 (aged 23)	Left-handed	Right-arm leg break	
73	Suminda Lakshan	Sri Lanka	7 April 1997 (aged 24)	Right-handed	Right-arm leg break	
Wicket-keepers
51	**Ben Dunk**	Australia	11 March 1987 (aged 34)	Left-handed	Right-arm off break	Overseas player
13	**Kusal Mendis**	Sri Lanka	2 February 1995 (aged 26)	Right-handed	Right-arm leg break	
23	**Sadeera Samarawickrama**	Sri Lanka	30 August 1995 (aged 26)	Right-handed	—	
7	Mohammed Shamaaz	Sri Lanka	2 February 2001 (aged 20)	Right-handed	Right-arm leg break	
Spin bowlers
16	Noor Ahmad	Afghanistan	3 January 2005 (aged 16)	Right-handed	Left-arm unorthodox spin	Overseas player
	Ashian Daniel	Sri Lanka	20 February 2001 (aged 20)	Right-handed	Right-arm off break	
Pace bowlers
5	**Mohammad Amir**	Pakistan	13 April 1992 (aged 29)	Left-handed	Left-arm fast	Overseas player
4	Nuwan Thushara	Sri Lanka	6 August 1994 (aged 27)	Right-handed	Right-arm medium-fast	
14	Pramod Madushan	Sri Lanka	14 December 1993 (aged 27)	Right-handed	Right-arm medium-fast	

== Teams and standings ==
=== Results by match ===
Round	1	2	3	4	5	6	7	8
Result	W	L	W	NR	L	L	W	W
Position	1	2	1	1	3	3	2	2

Source: Fixtures
W = Win; L = Loss; NR = No Result

=== Points table ===
Pos	Team	Pld	W	L	NR	Pts	NRR
1	Jaffna Kings (C)	8	6	2	0	12	2.210
2	Galle Gladiators (R)	8	4	3	1	9	0.143
3	Colombo Stars (4th)	8	4	4	0	8	−0.571
4	Dambulla Giants (3rd)	8	3	4	1	7	−1.003
5	Kandy Warriors	8	2	6	0	4	−0.668

Source: ESPN Cricinfo
- The top four teams qualified for the playoffs
- Advanced to Qualifier 1
- Advanced to Eliminator

== League stage ==
The full schedule was published on the official website of Sri Lankan Cricket on 13 October 2021.

Match 1
5 December 2021
19:30 (N)
Scorecard

Galle Gladiators; 164/7 (20 overs)	v	Jaffna Kings; 110 (18.2 overs)
Bhanuka Rajapaksa 56 (31); Jayden Seales 3/23 (4 overs)		Wahab Riaz 27 (20); Samit Patel 3/21 (4 overs)

Gale Gladiators won by 54 runs
R. Premadasa Stadium, Colombo
Umpires: Kumar Dharmasena and Ruchira Palliyaguruge
Player of the match: Samit Patel (Galle Gladiators)

- Jaffna Kings won the toss and elected to field.

Match 3
6 December 2021
19:30 (N)
Scorecard

Galle Gladiators; 116/8 (20 overs)	v	Colombo Stars; 117/6 (17.3 overs)
Ben Dunk 38 (25); Dhananjaya de Silva 2/18 (4 overs)		Dinesh Chandimal 26* (27); Nuwan Thushara 2/26 (2.3 overs)

Colombo Stars won by 4 wickets
R. Premadasa Stadium, Colombo
Umpires: Kumar Dharmasena and Deepal Gunawardene
Player of the match: Dhananjaya de Silva (Colombo Stars)

- Galle Gladiators won the toss and elected to bat.

Match 5
7 December 2021
19:30 (N)
Scorecard

Kandy Warriors; 143/6 (20 overs)	v	Galle Gladiators; 147/6 (19.2 overs)
Ahmed Shehzad 56 (51); Samit Patel 3/13 (4 overs)		Danushka Gunathilaka 45 (33); Sachindu Colombage 3/20 (4 overs)

Galle Gladiators won by 4 wickets
R. Premadasa Stadium, Colombo
Umpires: Hemantha Boteju and Kumar Dharmasena
Player of the match: Dhananjaya Lakshan (Galle Gladiators)

- Kandy Warriors won the toss and elected to bat.

Match 8
10 December 2021
15:00 (D/N)
Scorecard

Dambulla Giants; 159/7 (20 overs)	v	Galle Gladiators; 18/0 (1.2 overs)
Dasun Shanaka 37 (32); Nuwan Thushara 2/24 (3 overs)		Kusal Mendis 15* (5)

No result
R. Premadasa Stadium, Colombo
Umpires: Keerthi Bandara and Lyndon Hannibal

- Dambulla Giants won the toss and elected to bat.
- No further play was possible due to rain.

Match 10
11 December 2021
15:00 (D/N)
Scorecard

Galle Gladiators; 127/7 (20 overs)	v	Kandy Warriors; 131/5 (18.4 overs)
Kusal Mendis 44 (34); Kamindu Mendis 3/25 (4 overs)		Ravi Bopara 34* (39); Samit Patel 2/20 (4 overs)

Kandy Warriors won by 5 wickets
R. Premadasa Stadium, Colombo
Umpires: Ravindra Kottahachchi and Prageeth Rambukwella
Player of the match: Ravi Bopara (Kandy Warriors)

- Galle Gladiators won the toss and elected to bat.

Match 13
12 December 2021
19:30 (N)
Scorecard

Colombo Stars; 162/7 (18 overs)	v	Galle Gladiators; 121 (16.5 overs)
Angelo Mathews 73 (57); Dhananjaya Lakshan 2/22 (2 overs)		Kusal Mendis 64 (39); Naveen-ul-Haq 3/27 (3.5 overs)

Colombo Stars won by 41 runs
R. Premadasa Stadium, Colombo
Umpires: Asanga Jayasooriya and Raveendra Wimalasiri
Player of the match: Dinesh Chandimal (Colombo Stars)

- Colombo Stars won the toss and elected to bat.
- The match was reduced to 18 overs per side due to rain.

Match 16
14 December 2021
19:30 (N)
Scorecard

Galle Gladiators; 134/7 (14 overs)	v	Dambulla Giants; 125/5 (14 overs)
Kusal Mendis 35 (17); Imran Tahir 3/20 (3 overs)		Janith Liyanage 51 (37); Samit Patel 2/24 (3 overs)

Galle Gladiators won by 9 runs
R. Premadasa Stadium, Colombo
Umpires: Ravindra Kottahachchi and Prageeth Rambukwella
Player of the match: Samit Patel (Galle Gladiators)

- Dambulla Giants won the toss and elected to field.
- The match was reduced to 14 overs per side due to rain.

Match 19
17 December 2021
15:00 (D/N)
Scorecard

Galle Gladiators; 129/8 (20 overs)	v	Jaffna Kings; 109 (18.3 overs)
Bhanuka Rajapaksa 23 (25); Praveen Jayawickrama 2/13 (3 overs)		Shoaib Malik 23 (27); Noor Ahmad 2/12 (4 overs)

Galle Gladiators won by 20 runs
R. Premadasa Stadium, Colombo
Umpires: Asanga Jayasooriya and Prageeth Rambukwella
Player of the match: Bhanuka Rajapaksa (Galle Gladiators)

- Galle Gladiators won the toss and elected to bat.

== Playoffs ==
=== Qualifier 1 ===
Match 22
19 December 2021
20:30 (N)
Scorecard

Galle Gladiators; 188/5 (20 overs)	v	Jaffna Kings; 124 (16.5 overs)
Kusal Mendis 85 (53); Thisara Perera 2/36 (4 overs)		Rahmanullah Gurbaz 59 (37); Nuwan Thushara 5/13 (3.5 overs)

Galle Gladiators won by 64 Runs
Mahinda Rajapaksa International Cricket Stadium, Hambantota
Umpires: Ruchira Palliyaguruge and Prageeth Rambukwella
Player of the match: Kusal Mendis (Galle Gladiators)

- Jaffna Kings won the toss and elected to field.

=== Final ===
Match 24
23 December 2021
19:30 (N)
Scorecard

Jaffna Kings; 201/3 (20 overs)	v	Galle Gladiators; 178/9 (20 overs)
Avishka Fernando 63 (41); Samit Patel 1/32 (4 overs)		Danushka Gunathilaka 54 (21); Chaturanga de Silva 2/15 (3 overs)

Jaffna Kings won by 23 runs
Mahinda Rajapaksa International Cricket Stadium, Hambantota
Umpires: Lyndon Hannibal and Raveendra Wimalasiri
Player of the match: Avishka Fernando (Jaffna Kings)

- Jaffna Kings won the toss and elected to bat.

== Statistics ==
=== Most runs ===
Player	Matches	Runs	High score
Kusal Mendis	10	327	85
Danushka Gunathilaka	10	226	55
Bhanuka Rajapaksa	10	179	56
Samit Patel	10	138	42
Mohammad Hafeez	9	89	16

- Source: ESPNcricinfo

=== Most wickets ===
Player	Matches	Wickets	Best bowling
Samit Patel	10	16	3/13
Nuwan Thushara	8	12	5/13
Noor Ahmad	8	8	2/12
Dhananjaya Lakshan	6	6	2/11
Mohammad Amir	6	6	1/19

- Source: ESPNcricinfo
