= 2021 Lanka Premier League final =

Final match of the LPL 2021

2021 Lanka Premier League Final
- Event: 2021 Lanka Premier League
Jaffna Kings	Galle Gladiators
201/3	178/9
20 overs	20 overs
- Jaffna Kings won by 23 runs
- Date: 23 December 2021
- Venue: Mahinda Rajapaksa International Cricket Stadium, Hambantota
- Player of the match: Avishka Fernando (Jaffna Kings)
- Umpires: Lyndon Hannibal (Sri Lanka); Raveendra Wimalasiri (Sri Lanka)

The 2021 Lanka Premier League Final was played on 23 December 2021 at the Mahinda Rajapaksa International Cricket Stadium, Hambantota, Sri Lanka. It was a day/night twenty20 match between Galle Gladiators and Jaffna Kings, which decided the winner of 2021 season of the Lanka Premier League (LPL), an annual franchise cricket tournament in Sri Lanka. Jaffna Kings won the match by 23 runs beating Galle Gladiators, to win their second successive LPL title.

== Road to the final ==
Source: ESPNcricinfo

Galle Gladiators			vs	Jaffna Kings
League Stage
Opponent	Scorecard	Result	Titles	Opponent	Scorecard	Result
Jaffna Kings	5 December 2021	Won	Match 1	Galle Gladiators	5 December 2021	Lost
Colombo Stars	6 December 2021	Lost	Match 2	Dambulla Giants	7 December 2021	Won
Kandy Warriors	7 December 2021	Won	Match 3	Kandy Warriors	8 December 2021	Won
Dambulla Giants	10 December 2021	No result	Match 4	Colombo Kings	10 December 2021	Won
Kandy Warriors	11 December 2021	Lost	Match 5	Kandy Warriors	12 December 2021	Won
Colombo Stars	12 December 2021	Lost	Match 6	Dambulla Giants	13 December 2021	Won
Dambulla Giants	14 December 2021	Won	Match 7	Colombo Stars	16 December 2021	Won
Jaffna Kings	17 December 2021	Won	Match 8	Galle Gladiators	17 December 2021	Lost
Playoff stage
Qualifier 1				Qualifier 1
Opponent	Scorecard	Result	Titles	Opponent	Scorecard	Result
Jaffna Kings	19 December 2021	Won	Match 9	Galle Gladiators	19 December 2021	Lost
				Qualifier 2
				Opponent	Scorecard	Result
			Match 10	Dambulla Giants	21 December 2021	Won
2021 Lanka Premier League Final

== Match ==
=== Match officials ===
- On-field umpires: Lyndon Hannibal (SL) and Raveendra Wimalasiri (SL)
- Third umpire: Ruchira Palliyaguruge (SL)
- Reserve umpire: Prageeth Rambukwella (SL)
- Match referee: Ranjan Madugalle (SL)

=== Summery ===
Match 24
23 December 2021
19:30 (N)
Scorecard

Jaffna Kings; 201/3 (20 overs)	v	Galle Gladiators; 178/9 (20 overs)
Avishka Fernando 63 (41); Samit Patel 1/32 (4 overs)		Danushka Gunathilaka 54 (21); Chaturanga de Silva 2/15 (3 overs)

Jaffna Kings won by 23 runs
Mahinda Rajapaksa International Cricket Stadium, Hambantota
Umpires: Lyndon Hannibal and Raveendra Wimalasiri
Player of the match: Avishka Fernando (Jaffna Kings)

- Jaffna Kings won the toss and elected to bat.

=== Match scorecard ===
==== 1st innings ====
Jaffna Kings innings
Player	Status	Runs	Balls	4s	6s	Strike rate
Avishka Fernando	c Danushka b Thushara	63	41	8	2	153.65
Rahmanullah Gurbaz (wk)	c K. Mendis b Patel	35	18	3	3	194.44
Tom Kohler-Cadmore	not out	57	41	2	3	139.02
Shoaib Malik	c Pulina b Amir	23	11	1	2	209.09
Thisara Perera (c)	not out	17	9	1	2	188.88
Ashan Randika	did not bat					
Wanindu Hasaranga	did not bat					
Chaturanga de Silva	did not bat					
Jayden Seales	did not bat					
Suranga Lakmal	did not bat					
Maheesh Theekshana	did not bat					
Extras 6 (b 1, lb 2, wd 3); Total 201/3 (20 overs)				15	12	RR: 10.05

Fall of wickets: 1/56 (Gurbaz, 5.2 ov), 2/119 (Avishka, 12.4 ov), 3/181 (Malik, 18.2 ov)

Galle Gladiators bowling
Bowler	Overs	Maidens	Runs	Wickets	Econ	Wides	NBs
Mohammad Amir	4	0	39	1	9.75	2	0
Nuwan Thushara	4	0	33	1	8.25	1	0
Dhananjaya Lakshan	2	0	29	0	14.50	0	0
Isuru Udana	3	0	38	0	12.66	0	0
Samit Patel	4	0	32	1	8.00	0	0
Pulina Tharanga	3	0	27	0	9.00	0	0

==== 2nd innings ====
Target: 202 runs from 20 overs at 10.10 RR

Galle Gladiators innings
Player	Status	Runs	Balls	4s	6s	Strike rate
Kusal Mendis	run out (Thisara)	39	28	3	1	139.28
Danushka Gunathilaka	c Thisara b Wanindu	54	21	7	3	257.14
Ben Dunk (wk)	c Lakmal b Wanindu	0	1	0	0	0.00
Mohammad Hafeez	run out (Chathuranga/Wanindu/†Gurbaz)	10	6	2	0	166.66
Bhanuka Rajapaksa (c)	c Wanindu b Theekshana	14	16	2	0	87.50
Samit Patel	c Seales b Lakmal	22	20	0	1	110.00
Dhananjaya Lakshan	c Wanindu b Chathuranga	2	3	0	0	66.66
Pulina Tharanga	b Chathuranga	4	6	0	0	66.66
Isuru Udana	c Malik b Seales	9	11	1	0	81.81
Mohammad Amir	not out	6	6	1	0	100.00
Nuwan Thushara	not out	5	2	1	0	250.00
Extras 13 (b 1, lb 10, wd 2); Total 178/9 (20 overs)				17	5	RR: 10.10

Fall of wickets: 1/63 (Danushka, 4.2 ov), 2/63 (Dunk, 4.3 ov), 3/84 (Hafeez, 6.2 ov), 4/113 (Bhanuka, 10.4 ov), 5/129 (K. Mendis, 13.1 ov), 6/133 (Lakshan, 13.6 ov), 7/143 (Pulina, 15.5 ov), 8/158 (Patel, 17.6 ov), 9/168 (Isuru, 18.5 ov)

Jaffna Kings bowling
Bowler	Overs	Maidens	Runs	Wickets	Econ	Wides	NBs
Maheesh Theekshana	4	0	51	1	12.75	0	0
Jayden Seales	3	0	36	1	12.00	0	0
Suranga Lakmal	3	0	23	1	7.66	0	0
Wanindu Hasaranga	4	0	30	2	7.50	1	0
Shoaib Malik	3	0	12	0	4.00	1	0
Chaturanga de Silva	3	0	15	2	5.00	0	0
