= 2021 Lanka Premier League =

Second edition of Lanka Premier League

- Dates: 5 December – 23 December 2021
- Administrator: Sri Lanka Cricket
- Cricket format: Twenty20
- Tournament format(s): Double Round-robin and Playoffs
- Host: Sri Lanka
- Champions: Jaffna Kings (2nd title)
- Runners-up: Galle Gladiators
- Participants: 5
- Matches: 24
- Player of the series: Avishka Fernando (Jaffna Kings)
- Most runs: Kusal Mendis (Galle Gladiators) (327)
- Most wickets: Samit Patel (Galle Gladiators) (16); Maheesh Theekshana (Jaffna Kings) (16)
- Official website: lplt20sl.com

The 2021 Lanka Premier League, also known as Wolf777 News LPL T20, for sponsorship reasons, was the second edition of the Lanka Premier League (LPL) Twenty20 franchise cricket tournament in Sri Lanka. It took place from 5 to 23 December 2021. There were plans to increase the number of teams from five to six, but Sri Lanka Cricket (SLC) confirmed that five teams would take part, as per the first tournament.

In June 2021, Charith Senanayake was appointed as the chairman of the LPL Technical Committee for the 2021 Lanka Premier League. In the same month, SLC agreed the termination of the Colombo Kings and the Dambulla Viiking teams due to financial issues. SLC also confirmed that two new franchise teams would replace them. The following month, SLC also terminated the franchise of the Jaffna Stallions. Originally, the tournament was scheduled to be held between 30 July and 22 August 2021. On 9 July 2021, the tournament was rescheduled to be held from 19 November to 12 December 2021, due to unavailability of overseas players. In September 2021, Dambulla Viiking changed their name to Dambulla Giants after changing owners. Jaffna Stallions also changed their name to Jaffna Kings later that month. In October 2021, Kandy Tuskers changed their name to Kandy Warriors after a change of owners. In November 2021, Colombo Kings changed their name to Colombo Stars after being acquired by a new owner.

On 23 December 2021, Jaffna Kings beat Galle Gladiators by 23 runs in the final, to win their second successive LPL title.

== Squads ==
The player draft was held on 9 November 2021. On 29 November 2021, all the captains and coaches were confirmed.

| Colombo Stars | Dambulla Giants | Galle Gladiators | Jaffna Kings | Kandy Warriors |
|---|---|---|---|---|
| Angelo Mathews (c); Dhananjaya de Silva; ~~Chris Gayle~~; Dushmantha Chameera; ~~Taskin Ahmed~~; Pathum Nissanka; Lakshan Sandakan; Seekkuge Prasanna; ~~Manpreet Singh~~; ~~Gihan Rupasinghe~~; ~~Lahiru Gamage~~; Jehan Daniel; ~~Malindu Maduranga~~; ~~Nalin Priyadarshana~~; ~~Hashan Dumindu~~; ~~Kanagarathinam Kabilraj~~; Kusal Perera; Dinesh Chandimal; Thikshila de Silva; Akila Dananjaya; Shiran Fernando; Ashan Priyanjan; Ravi Rampaul; Naveen-ul-Haq; ~~Haris Sohail~~; Sherfane Rutherford; Tom Banton; Himesh Ramanayake; Keemo Paul; Jeffrey Vandersay; Ravindu Fernando; ~~David Wiese~~; Karim Janat | Dasun Shanaka (c); Niroshan Dickwella; Imran Tahir; ~~Rilee Rossouw~~; Chamika Karunaratne; Ramesh Mendis; Sohaib Maqsood; ~~Odean Smith~~; Josh Little; Nuwan Pradeep; Najibullah Zadran; Tharindu Ratnayake; Lahiru Udara; Sacha De Alwis; Muditha Lakshan; Kalana Perera; Sachitha Jayathilake; Madushan Ravichandrakumar; Janith Liyanage; Chamikara Edirisinghe; Dilshan Munaweera; Marchant de Lange; Nuwanidu Fernando; Phil Salt; Lahiru Samarakoon; Sandun Weerakkody | Bhanuka Rajapaksa (c); Mohammad Hafeez; Isuru Udana; ~~Tabraiz Shamsi~~; Kusal Mendis; Mohammad Amir; ~~Sarfaraz Ahmed~~; Danushka Gunathilaka; Samit Patel; Dhananjaya Lakshan; Anwar Ali; Pulina Tharanga; Nuwan Thushara; Lahiru Madushanka; ~~Dilshan Madushanka~~; Ashian Daniel; Kevin Koththigoda; Mohammed Shamaaz; Suminda Lakshan; Angelo Jayasinghe; Ben Dunk; Sadeera Samarawickrama; Pramod Madushan; Noor Ahmad; Sahan Arachchige | Thisara Perera (c); ~~Faf du Plessis~~; Wahab Riaz; Wanindu Hasaranga; Shoaib Malik; Usman Shinwari; Avishka Fernando; Maheesh Theekshana; Rahmanullah Gurbaz; Upul Tharanga; Chaturanga de Silva; Jayden Seales; Suranga Lakmal; Ashen Bandara; Chamika Gunasekara; Vijayakanth Viyaskanth; Theivendiram Dinoshan; Ashan Randika; Rathnaraja Thanuradan; Krishan Sanjula; Praveen Jayawickrama; Shammu Ashan; Tom Kohler-Cadmore | Angelo Perera (c); Charith Asalanka (vc); ~~Rovman Powell~~; ~~Cameron Delport~~; Lahiru Kumara; ~~Mohammad Mithun~~; ~~Nazmul Islam~~; ~~Mehedi Hasan Rana~~; Asela Gunaratne; Milinda Siriwardana; ~~Amjad Khan~~; Ishan Jayaratne; Binura Fernando; Kamindu Mendis; Kamil Mishara; Ayana Siriwardhana; Nimesh Vimukthi; ~~Udara Jayasundera~~; Shashika Dulshan; Kalhara Senarathne; Minod Bhanuka; Sachindu Colombage; Ahmed Shehzad; ~~Mohammad Irfan~~; Rubel Hossain; Kennar Lewis; Tillakaratne Sampath; ~~Devon Thomas~~; Shiraz Ahmed; Kasun Rajitha; Ravi Bopara; Tom Moores |

== Venues ==
R. Premadasa Stadium in Colombo and Mahinda Rajapaksa International Cricket Stadium in Hambantota were selected as the venues.

| Colombo | Hambantota |
|---|---|
| R. Premadasa Stadium | Mahinda Rajapaksa International Cricket Stadium |
| Capacity: 35,000 | Capacity: 34,300 |
| Matches: 20 | Matches: 4 |
2021 Lanka Premier League is located in Sri Lanka

== Teams and standings ==
=== Points table ===
| Pos | Team | Pld | W | L | NR | Pts | NRR |
|---|---|---|---|---|---|---|---|
| 1 | Jaffna Kings (C) | 8 | 6 | 2 | 0 | 12 | 2.210 |
| 2 | Galle Gladiators (R) | 8 | 4 | 3 | 1 | 9 | 0.143 |
| 3 | Colombo Stars (4th) | 8 | 4 | 4 | 0 | 8 | −0.571 |
| 4 | Dambulla Giants (3rd) | 8 | 3 | 4 | 1 | 7 | −1.003 |
| 5 | Kandy Warriors | 8 | 2 | 6 | 0 | 4 | −0.668 |

Source: ESPN Cricinfo
- The top four teams qualified for the playoffs
- Advanced to Qualifier 1
- Advanced to Eliminator

=== Match summary ===
| Team | Group matches | | | | | | | | Playoffs | | |
| Team | 1 | 2 | 3 | 4 | 5 | 6 | 7 | 8 | Q1/E | Q2 | F |
|---|---|---|---|---|---|---|---|---|---|---|---|
| Colombo Stars | 2 | 2 | 2 | 2 | 4 | 6 | 6 | 8 | L | | |
| Dambulla Giants | 2 | 2 | 4 | 5 | 7 | 7 | 7 | 7 | W | L | |
| Galle Gladiators | 2 | 2 | 4 | 5 | 5 | 5 | 7 | 9 | W | | L |
| Jaffna Kings | 0 | 2 | 4 | 6 | 8 | 10 | 12 | 12 | L | W | W |
| Kandy Warriors | 0 | 0 | 0 | 2 | 2 | 2 | 4 | 4 | | | |

| Win | Loss | No result |

Note: The total points at the end of each group match are listed.
Note: Click on the points (group matches) or W/L (playoffs) to see the match summary.

== League stage ==
The full schedule was published on 13 October 2021.

Match 1
5 December 2021
19:30 (N)
Scorecard

| Galle Gladiators; 164/7 (20 overs) | v | Jaffna Kings; 110 (18.4 overs) |
| Bhanuka Rajapaksa 56 (31); Jayden Seales 3/23 (4 overs) | | Wahab Riaz 27 (20); Samit Patel 3/21 (4 overs) |

Galle Gladiators won by 54 runs
R. Premadasa Stadium, Colombo
Umpires: Kumar Dharmasena and Ruchira Palliyaguruge
Player of the match: Samit Patel (Galle Gladiators)

- Jaffna Kings won the toss and elected to field.

Match 2
6 December 2021
15:00 (D/N)
Scorecard

| Dambulla Giants; 190/7 (20 overs) | v | Kandy Warriors; 170/8 (20 overs) |
| Phil Salt 64 (27); Lahiru Kumara 3/34 (4 overs) | | Rovman Powell 42 (21); Ramesh Mendis 3/21 (4 overs) |

Dambulla Giants won by 20 runs
R. Premadasa Stadium, Colombo
Umpires: Keerthi Bandara and Raveendra Wimalasiri
Player of the match: Phil Salt (Dambulla Giants)

- Dambulla Giants won the toss and elected to bat.

Match 3
6 December 2021
19:30 (N)
Scorecard

| Galle Gladiators; 116/8 (20 overs) | v | Colombo Stars; 117/6 (17.3 overs) |
| Ben Dunk 38 (25); Dhananjaya de Silva 2/18 (4 overs) | | Dinesh Chandimal 26* (27); Nuwan Thushara 2/26 (2.3 overs) |

Colombo Stars won by 4 wickets
R. Premadasa Stadium, Colombo
Umpires: Kumar Dharmasena and Deepal Gunawardene
Player of the match: Dhananjaya de Silva (Colombo Stars)

- Galle Gladiators won the toss and elected to bat.

Match 4
7 December 2021
15:00 (D/N)
Scorecard

| Dambulla Giants; 110 (19.3 overs) | v | Jaffna Kings; 114/2 (12.3 overs) |
| Nuwanidu Fernando 23 (25); Wanindu Hasaranga 3/16 (4 overs) | | Tom Kohler-Cadmore 45* (30); Imran Tahir 1/20 (4 overs) |

Jaffna Kings won by 8 wickets
R. Premadasa Stadium, Colombo
Umpires: Kumar Dharmasena and Ravindra Kottahachchi
Player of the match: Maheesh Theekshana (Jaffna Kings)

- Dambulla Giants won the toss and elected to bat.

Match 5
7 December 2021
19:30 (N)
Scorecard

| Kandy Warriors; 143/6 (20 overs) | v | Galle Gladiators; 147/6 (19.2 overs) |
| Ahmed Shehzad 56 (51); Samit Patel 3/13 (4 overs) | | Danushka Gunathilaka 45 (33); Sachindu Colombage 3/20 (4 overs) |

Galle Gladiators won by 4 wickets
R. Premadasa Stadium, Colombo
Umpires: Hemantha Boteju and Kumar Dharmasena
Player of the match: Dhananjaya Lakshan (Galle Gladiators)

- Kandy Warriors won the toss and elected to bat.

Match 6
8 December 2021
15:00 (D/N)
Scorecard

| Dambulla Giants; 195/6 (20 overs) | v | Colombo Stars; 177 (18.5 overs) |
| Phil Salt 62 (34); Dushmantha Chameera 3/34 (4 overs) | | Dinesh Chandimal 26 (16); Nuwan Pradeep 3/50 (4 overs) |

Dambulla Giants won by 18 runs
R. Premadasa Stadium, Colombo
Umpires: Kumar Dharmasena and Rohitha Kottahachchi
Player of the match: Phil Salt (Dambulla Giants)

- Dambulla Giants won the toss and elected to bat.

Match 7
8 December 2021
19:30 (N)
Scorecard

| Jaffna Kings; 181/6 (14 overs) | v | Kandy Warriors; 166/5 (14 overs) |
| Thisara Perera 53 (21); Shiraz Ahmed 3/22 (3 overs) | | Rovman Powell 61 (19); Jayden Seales 2/40 (3 overs) |

Jaffna Kings won by 14 runs (DLS method)
R. Premadasa Stadium, Colombo
Umpires: Asanga Jayasooriya and Prageeth Rambukwella
Player of the match: Suranga Lakmal (Jaffna Kings)

- Kandy Warriors won the toss and elected to field.
- Rain stopped play during Jaffna Kings innings. Kandy Warriors were set a revised target of 181 runs from 14 overs.
- Shiraz Ahmed (Kandy Warriors) made his T20 debut.

Match 8
10 December 2021
15:00 (D/N)
Scorecard

| Dambulla Giants; 159/7 (20 overs) | v | Galle Gladiators; 18/0 (1.2 overs) |
| Dasun Shanaka 37 (32); Nuwan Thushara 2/24 (3 overs) | | Kusal Mendis 15* (5) |

No result
R. Premadasa Stadium, Colombo
Umpires: Keerthi Bandara and Lyndon Hannibal

- Dambulla Giants won the toss and elected to bat.
- No further play was possible due to rain.

Match 9
10 December 2021
19:30 (N)
Scorecard

| Jaffna Kings; 207/6 (18 overs) | v | Colombo Stars; 114 (15.5 overs) |
| Thisara Perera 57* (23); Seekkuge Prasanna 3/31 (4 overs) | | Ashan Priyanjan 35 (25); Maheesh Theekshana 4/25 (4 overs) |

Jaffna Kings won by 93 runs
R. Premadasa Stadium, Colombo
Umpires: Deepal Gunawardene and Ruchira Palliyaguruge
Player of the match: Thisara Perera (Jaffna Kings)

- Colombo Stars won the toss and elected to field.
- The match was reduced to 18 overs per side due to rain.

Match 10
11 December 2021
15:00 (D/N)
Scorecard

| Galle Gladiators; 127/7 (20 overs) | v | Kandy Warriors; 131/5 (18.4 overs) |
| Kusal Mendis 44 (34); Kamindu Mendis 3/25 (4 overs) | | Ravi Bopara 34* (39); Samit Patel 2/20 (4 overs) |

Kandy Warriors won by 5 wickets
R. Premadasa Stadium, Colombo
Umpires: Ravindra Kottahachchi and Prageeth Rambukwella
Player of the match: Ravi Bopara (Kandy Warriors)

- Galle Gladiators won the toss and elected to bat.

Match 11
11 December 2021
19:30 (N)
Scorecard

| Dambulla Giants; 138/9 (20 overs) | v | Colombo Stars; 137/8 (20 overs) |
| Niroshan Dickwella 30 (16); Jeffrey Vandersay 3/25 (4 overs) | | Dinesh Chandimal 65* (40); Tharindu Ratnayake 3/18 (4 overs) |

Dambulla Giants won by 1 run
R. Premadasa Stadium, Colombo
Umpires: Hemantha Boteju and Raveendra Wimalasiri
Player of the match: Tharindu Ratnayake (Dambulla Giants)

- Dambulla Giants won the toss and elected to bat.

Match 12
12 December 2021
15:00 (D/N)
Scorecard

| Kandy Warriors; 94/2 (12.2 overs) | v | Jaffna Kings; 95/3 (8.4 overs) |
| Charith Asalanka 44* (34); Shoaib Malik 1/19 (3 overs) | | Thisara Perera 29* (13); Binura Fernando 1/15 (1.4 overs) |

Jaffna Kings won by 7 wickets (DLS method)
R. Premadasa Stadium, Colombo
Umpires: Lyndon Hannibal and Rohitha Kottahachchi
Player of the match: Shoaib Malik (Jaffna Kings)

- Jaffna Kings won the toss and elected to field.
- Rain stopped play during Kandy Warriors innings. Jaffna Kings were set a revised target of 95 runs from 10 overs.

Match 13
12 December 2021
19:30 (N)
Scorecard

| Colombo Stars; 162/7 (18 overs) | v | Galle Gladiators; 121 (16.5 overs) |
| Angelo Mathews 73 (57); Dhananjaya Lakshan 2/22 (2 overs) | | Kusal Mendis 64 (39); Naveen-ul-Haq 3/27 (3.5 overs) |

Colombo Stars won by 41 runs
R. Premadasa Stadium, Colombo
Umpires: Asanga Jayasooriya and Raveendra Wimalasiri
Player of the match: Dinesh Chandimal (Colombo Stars)

- Colombo Stars won the toss and elected to bat.
- The match was reduced to 18 overs per side due to rain.

Match 14
13 December 2021
19:30 (N)
Scorecard

| Dambulla Giants; 69 (14.1 overs) | v | Jaffna Kings; 71/3 (9.2 overs) |
| Phil Salt 23 (22); Chaturanga de Silva 4/16 (4 overs) | | Wanindu Hasaranga 37 (18); Imran Tahir 2/21 (4 overs) |

Jaffna Kings won by 7 wickets
R. Premadasa Stadium, Colombo
Umpires: Keerthi Bandara and Raveendra Wimalasiri
Player of the match: Chaturanga de Silva (Jaffna Kings)

- Jaffna Kings won the toss and elected to field.

Match 15
14 December 2021
15:00 (D/N)
Scorecard

| Kandy Warriors; 146/9 (20 overs) | v | Colombo Stars; 150/5 (19.4 overs) |
| Kennar Lewis 62 (44); Dushmantha Chameera 4/35 (4 overs) | | Dinesh Chandimal 44 (27); Nimesh Vimukthi 2/11 (4 overs) |

Colombo Kings won by 5 wickets
R. Premadasa Stadium, Colombo
Umpires: Deepal Gunawardene and Lyndon Hannibal
Player of the match: Seekkuge Prasanna (Colombo Kings)

- Colombo Stars won the toss and elected to field.

Match 16
14 December 2021
19:30 (N)
Scorecard

| Galle Gladiators; 134/7 (14 overs) | v | Dambulla Giants; 125/5 (14 overs) |
| Kusal Mendis 35 (17); Imran Tahir 3/20 (3 overs) | | Janith Liyanage 51 (37); Samit Patel 2/24 (3 overs) |

Galle Gladiators won by 9 runs
R. Premadasa Stadium, Colombo
Umpires: Ravindra Kottahachchi and Prageeth Rambukwella
Player of the match: Samit Patel (Galle Gladiators)

- Dambulla Giants won the toss and elected to field.
- The match was reduced to 14 overs per side due to rain.

Match 17
16 December 2021
15:00 (D/N)
Scorecard

| Jaffna Kings; 193/5 (20 overs) | v | Colombo Stars; 91 (15.5 overs) |
| Tom Kohler-Cadmore 92 (55); Naveen-ul-Haq 3/27 (4 overs) | | Tom Banton 30 (33); Jayden Seales 4/13 (2.5 overs) |

Jaffna Kings won by 102 runs
R. Premadasa Stadium, Colombo
Umpires: Hemantha Boteju and Prageeth Rambukwella
Player of the match: Tom Kohler-Cadmore (Jaffna Kings)

- Jaffna Kings won the toss and elected to bat.

Match 18
16 December 2021
19:30 (N)
Scorecard

| Dambulla Giants; 130/9 (20 overs) | v | Kandy Warriors; 135/4 (19.2 overs) |
| Ramesh Mendis 41 (28); Binura Fernando 3/22 (4 overs) | | Ravi Bopara 59* (50); Imran Tahir 2/17 (4 overs) |

Kandy Warriors won by 6 wickets
R. Premadasa Stadium, Colombo
Umpires: Rohitha Kottahachchi and Raveendra Wimalasiri
Player of the match: Ravi Bopara (Kandy Warriors)

- Dambulla Giants won the toss and elected to bat.

Match 19
17 December 2021
15:00 (D/N)
Scorecard

| Galle Gladiators; 129/8 (20 overs) | v | Jaffna Kings; 109 (18.3 overs) |
| Bhanuka Rajapaksa 23 (25); Praveen Jayawickrama 2/13 (3 overs) | | Shoaib Malik 23 (27); Noor Ahmad 2/12 (4 overs) |

Galle Gladiators won by 20 runs
R. Premadasa Stadium, Colombo
Umpires: Asanga Jayasooriya and Prageeth Rambukwella
Player of the match: Bhanuka Rajapaksa (Galle Gladiators)

- Galle Gladiators won the toss and elected to bat.

Match 20
17 December 2021
19:30 (N)
Scorecard

| Colombo Stars; 182/6 (20 overs) | v | Kandy Warriors; 124 (17 overs) |
| Kusal Perera 58 (38); Nimesh Vimukthi 3/24 (4 overs) | | Ravi Bopara 47 (31); Jeffrey Vandersay 6/25 (4 overs) |

Colombo Stars won by 58 runs
R. Premadasa Stadium, Colombo
Umpires: Keerthi Bandara and Lyndon Hannibal
Player of the match: Jeffrey Vandersay (Colombo Stars)

- Kandy Warriors won the toss and elected to field.

== Playoffs ==
Semifinals
19 December 2021 — Hambantota
Jaffna Kings | 124 (16.5 overs)
Galle Gladiators | 188/5 (20 overs)
19 December 2021 — Hambantota
Colombo Stars | 145/6 (20 overs)
Dambulla Giants | 146/4 (18.5 overs)

Preliminary final
21 December 2021 — Hambantota
1 | Jaffna Kings | 210/4 (20 overs)
4 | Dambulla Giants | 187/9 (20 overs)

Final
23 December 2021 — Hambantota
2 | Galle Gladiators | 178/9 (20 overs)
1 | Jaffna Kings | 201/3 (20 overs)

=== Eliminator ===
Match 21
19 December 2021
16:00 (D/N)
Scorecard

| Colombo Stars; 145/6 (20 overs) | v | Dambulla Giants; 146/4 (18.5 overs) |
| Angelo Mathews 50* (34); Nuwan Pradeep 2/23 (4 overs) | | Janith Liyanage 56* (47); Dushmantha Chameera 1/24 (4 overs) |

Dambulla Giants won by 6 wickets
Mahinda Rajapaksa International Cricket Stadium, Hambantota
Umpires: Lyndon Hannibal and Raveendra Wimalasiri
Player of the match: Janith Liyanage (Dambulla Giants)

- Colombo Stars won the toss and elected to bat.

=== Qualifier 1 ===
Match 22
19 December 2021
20:30 (N)
Scorecard

| Galle Gladiators; 188/5 (20 overs) | v | Jaffna Kings; 124 (16.5 overs) |
| Kusal Mendis 85 (53); Thisara Perera 2/36 (4 overs) | | Rahmanullah Gurbaz 59 (37); Nuwan Thushara 5/13 (3.5 overs) |

Galle Gladiators won by 64 Runs
Mahinda Rajapaksa International Cricket Stadium, Hambantota
Umpires: Ruchira Palliyaguruge and Prageeth Rambukwella
Player of the match: Kusal Mendis (Galle Gladiators)

- Jaffna Kings won the toss and elected to field.

=== Qualifier 2 ===
Match 23
21 December 2021
19:30 (N)
Scorecard

| Jaffna Kings; 210/4 (20 overs) | v | Dambulla Giants; 187/9 (20 overs) |
| Avishka Fernando 100 (64); Lahiru Samarakoon 2/30 (2 overs) | | Chamika Karunaratne 75* (47); Jayden Seales 3/24 (4 overs) |

Jaffna Kings won by 23 runs
Mahinda Rajapaksa International Cricket Stadium, Hambantota
Umpires: Lyndon Hannibal and Prageeth Rambukwella
Player of the match: Avishka Fernando (Jaffna Kings)

- Dambulla Giants won the toss and elected to field.
- Avishka Fernando (Jaffna Kings) scored his first century in Twenty20 cricket.

=== Final ===
Match 24
23 December 2021
19:30 (N)
Scorecard

| Jaffna Kings; 201/3 (20 overs) | v | Galle Gladiators; 178/9 (20 overs) |
| Avishka Fernando 63 (41); Samit Patel 1/32 (4 overs) | | Danushka Gunathilaka 54 (21); Chaturanga de Silva 2/15 (3 overs) |

Jaffna Kings won by 23 runs
Mahinda Rajapaksa International Cricket Stadium, Hambantota
Umpires: Lyndon Hannibal and Raveendra Wimalasiri
Player of the match: Avishka Fernando (Jaffna Kings)

- Jaffna Kings won the toss and elected to bat.

== Statistics ==
=== Most runs ===
| Player | Team | Matches | Runs | High score |
|---|---|---|---|---|
| Kusal Mendis | Galle Gladiators | 10 | 327 | 85 |
| Avishka Fernando | Jaffna Kings | 10 | 312 | 100 |
| Phil Salt | Dambulla Giants | 10 | 301 | 64 |
| Tom Kohler-Cadmore | Jaffna Kings | 11 | 296 | 92 |
| Dinesh Chandimal | Colombo Stars | 9 | 277 | 65* |

- Source: ESPNcricinfo

=== Most wickets ===
| Player | Team | Matches | Wickets | Best bowling |
|---|---|---|---|---|
| Samit Patel | Galle Gladiators | 10 | 16 | 3/13 |
| Maheesh Theekshana | Jaffna Kings | 10 | 16 | 4/25 |
| Jayden Seales | Jaffna Kings | 7 | 15 | 4/13 |
| Imran Tahir | Dambulla Giants | 10 | 15 | 3/20 |
| Seekkuge Prasanna | Colombo Stars | 8 | 13 | 3/31 |

- Source: ESPNcricinfo
