= Sri Lankan cricket team in Bangladesh in 2023–24 =

International cricket tour

Sri Lankan cricket team in Bangladesh in 2024
| | Bangladesh | Sri Lanka |
- Dates: 4 March – 3 April 2024
| Captains | Najmul Hossain Shanto | Dhananjaya de Silva (Tests) Kusal Mendis (ODIs) Wanindu Hasaranga (Note: Charith Asalanka captained Sri Lanka for first two T20Is.) (T20Is) |

Test series
- Result: Sri Lanka won the 2-match series 2–0
| Most runs | Kamindu Mendis (361) | Mominul Haque (175) |
| Most wickets | Lahiru Kumara (11) | Khaled Ahmed (7) |
- Player of the series: Kamindu Mendis (SL)

One Day International series
- Results: Bangladesh won the 3-match series 2–1
| Most runs | Najmul Hossain Shanto (163) | Janith Liyanage (177) |
| Most wickets | Taskin Ahmed (8) | Wanindu Hasaranga (6) |
- Player of the series: Najmul Hossain Shanto (Ban)

Twenty20 International series
- Results: Sri Lanka won the 3-match series 2–1
| Most runs | Najmul Hossain Shanto (74) | Kusal Mendis (181) |
| Most wickets | Taskin Ahmed (4) | Nuwan Thushara (5) |
- Player of the series: Kusal Mendis (SL)

The Sri Lanka cricket team toured Bangladesh in March and April 2024 to play two Test, three One Day International (ODI) and three Twenty20 International (T20I) matches. The Test series formed part of the 2023–2025 ICC World Test Championship. The fixtures for the tour were confirmed in February 2024.

== Squads ==
| Bangladesh | | | Sri Lanka | | |
| Tests | ODIs | T20Is | Tests | ODIs | T20Is |
|---|---|---|---|---|---|
| Najmul Hossain Shanto (c); Khaled Ahmed; Shakib Al Hasan; Litton Das (wk); Mominul Haque; Musfik Hasan; Nayeem Hasan; Zakir Hasan; Mahmudul Hasan Joy; Shahadat Hossain; Towhid Hridoy; Shadman Islam; Shoriful Islam; Taijul Islam; Hasan Mahmud; Mehidy Hassan Miraz; ~~Mushfiqur Rahim (wk)~~; Nahid Rana | Najmul Hossain Shanto (c); Taskin Ahmed; Jaker Ali (wk); Litton Das (wk); Anamul Haque (wk); Tanzid Hasan; Rishad Hossain; Tawhid Hridoy; Shoriful Islam; Taijul Islam; Mahmudullah; Hasan Mahmud; Mehidy Hasan Miraz; Mushfiqur Rahim; Mustafizur Rahman; Tanzim Hasan Sakib; Soumya Sarkar | Najmul Hossain Shanto (c); Taskin Ahmed; Jaker Ali (wk); Litton Das (wk); Mahedi Hasan; Anamul Haque (wk); Rishad Hossain; Tawhid Hridoy; ~~Aliss Islam~~; Shoriful Islam; Taijul Islam; Mahmudullah; Mohammad Naim; Mustafizur Rahman; Tanzim Hasan Sakib; Soumya Sarkar | Dhananjaya de Silva (c); Kusal Mendis (vc); Dinesh Chandimal; Asitha Fernando; Vishwa Fernando; Chamika Gunasekara; ~~Wanindu Hasaranga~~; Prabath Jayasuriya; Dimuth Karunaratne; Lahiru Kumara; Nishan Madushka; Angelo Mathews; Kamindu Mendis; Ramesh Mendis; Nishan Peiris; Kasun Rajitha; Sadeera Samarawickrama; Lahiru Udara | Kusal Mendis (c) (wk); Charith Asalanka (vc); Sahan Arachchige; Akila Dananjaya; Avishka Fernando; Wanindu Hasaranga; Chamika Karunaratne; Lahiru Kumara; Janith Liyanage; Dilshan Madushanka; Pramod Madushan; Kamindu Mendis; Pathum Nissanka; Sadeera Samarawickrama (wk); Maheesh Theekshana; Dunith Wellalage | Wanindu Hasaranga (c); Charith Asalanka (vc); Niroshan Dickwella (wk); Kusal Mendis (wk); Avishka Fernando; Sadeera Samarawickrama; Dasun Shanaka; ~~Kusal Perera (wk)~~; Angelo Mathews; Akila Dananjaya; Dhananjaya de Silva; Kamindu Mendis; Matheesha Pathirana; Maheesh Theekshana; Binura Fernando; Dilshan Madushanka; Nuwan Thushara; Jeffrey Vandersay |

Ahead of the series, Najmul Hossain Shanto was named captain of Bangladesh in all three formats. On 1st March 2024, Niroshan Dickwella was added to Sri Lanka's T20I squad as a replacement for Kusal Perera who was withdrawn due to respiratory infection.

On 2 March 2024, Jaker Ali was added to Bangladesh's T20I squad as a replacement for Aliss Islam who was ruled out due to finger injury. On 16 March 2024, Jaker Ali was added to Bangladesh's ODI squad as a replacement for Litton Das who was released from the squad. On 17 March 2024, Tanzim Hasan Sakib was ruled out of the squad ahead of the third ODI due to hamstring injury, and was replaced by Hasan Mahmud.

On 19 March 2024, both Mushfiqur Rahim and Wanindu Hasaranga were ruled out the Test series. While Rahim was ruled out due to thumb injury, Hasaranga was suspended for the Test series for breaching of ICC code of conduct. On 20 March 2024, Towhid Hridoy was added to Bangladesh's Test squad as a replacement for Mushfiqur Rahim.

For the second Test, Shakib Al Hasan and Hasan Mahmud replaced Hridoy and Musfik Hasan in Bangladesh's squad.

On 27 March 2024, Asitha Fernando replaced injured Kasun Rajitha in Sri Lanka's squad for the second Test.

== T20I series ==
=== 1st T20I ===
4 March 2024
18:00 (N)
Scorecard

| Sri Lanka; 206/3 (20 overs) | v | Bangladesh; 203/8 (20 overs) |
| Sadeera Samarawickrama 61* (48); Rishad Hossain 1/32 (4 overs) | | Jaker Ali 68 (34); Angelo Mathews 2/17 (3 overs) |

Sri Lanka won by 3 runs
Sylhet International Cricket Stadium, Sylhet
Umpires: Tanvir Ahmed (Ban) and Masudur Rahman (Ban)
Player of the match: Charith Asalanka (SL)

- Bangladesh won the toss and elected to field.
- 409 runs were scored in the match, the highest men's T20I match aggregate in Bangladesh.
- Jaker Ali hit 6 sixes in the match, the most by any Bangladeshi batter in a men's T20I.

=== 2nd T20I ===
6 March 2024
18:00 (N)
Scorecard

| Sri Lanka; 165/5 (20 overs) | v | Bangladesh; 170/2 (18.1 overs) |
| Kamindu Mendis 37 (27); Soumya Sarkar 1/5 (1 over) | | Najmul Hossain Shanto 53* (38); Matheesha Pathirana 2/28 (3.4 overs) |

Bangladesh won by 8 wickets
Sylhet International Cricket Stadium, Sylhet
Umpires: Gazi Sohel (Ban) and Sharfuddoula (Ban)
Player of the match: Najmul Hossain Shanto (Ban)

- Bangladesh won the toss and elected to field.

=== 3rd T20I ===
9 March 2024
15:00 (D/N)
Scorecard

| Sri Lanka; 174/7 (20 overs) | v | Bangladesh; 146 (19.4 overs) |
| Kusal Mendis 86 (55); Taskin Ahmed 2/25 (4 overs) | | Rishad Hossain 53 (30); Nuwan Thushara 5/20 (4 overs) |

Sri Lanka won by 28 runs
Sylhet International Cricket Stadium, Sylhet
Umpires: Tanvir Ahmed (Ban) and Sharfuddoula (Ban)
Player of the match: Nuwan Thushara (SL)

- Bangladesh won the toss and elected to field.
- Nuwan Thushara (SL) took his first hat-trick in T20Is and became the fifth Sri Lankan bowler to do so.
- Nuwan Thushara took his maiden five-wicket haul in T20Is.
- Mustafizur Rahman became the third Bangladeshi player to take 300 wickets across all formats of international cricket.
- Rishad Hossain went past Jaker Ali hitting 7 sixes in the match, the most by a Bangladeshi batter in a men's T20I.

== ODI series ==
=== 1st ODI ===
13 March 2024
14:30 (D/N)
Scorecard

| Sri Lanka; 255 (48.5 overs) | v | Bangladesh; 257/4 (44.4 overs) |
| Janith Liyanage 67 (69); Tanzim Hasan Sakib 3/44 (8.4 overs) | | Najmul Hossain Shanto 122* (129); Dilshan Madushanka 2/44 (8 overs) |

Bangladesh won by 6 wickets
Zohur Ahmed Chowdhury Stadium, Chattogram
Umpires: Richard Kettleborough (Eng) and Sharfuddoula (Ban)
Player of the match: Najmul Hossain Shanto (Ban)

- Sri Lanka won the toss and elected to bat.

=== 2nd ODI ===
15 March 2024
14:30 (D/N)
Scorecard

| Bangladesh; 286/7 (50 overs) | v | Sri Lanka; 287/7 (47.1 overs) |
| Towhid Hridoy 96* (102); Wanindu Hasaranga 4/45 (10 overs) | | Pathum Nissanka 114 (113); Taskin Ahmed 2/49 (9 overs); Shoriful Islam 2/49 (9 overs) |

Sri Lanka won by 3 wickets
Zohur Ahmed Chowdhury Stadium, Chattogram
Umpires: Adrian Holdstock (SA) and Masudur Rahman (Ban)
Player of the match: Pathum Nissanka (SL)

- Sri Lanka won the toss and elected to field.
- Taskin Ahmed (Ban) took his 100th wicket in ODIs.
- Soumya Sarkar became the fastest Bangladeshi batter to score 2,000 runs in ODIs, in terms of innings (64).
- Pathum Nissanka and Charith Asalanka's partnership of 185 was the highest fourth-wicket partnership for Sri Lanka in ODIs.

=== 3rd ODI ===
18 March 2024
09:45
Scorecard

| Sri Lanka; 235 (50 overs) | v | Bangladesh; 237/6 (40.2 overs) |
| Janith Liyanage 101* (102); Taskin Ahmed 3/42 (10 overs) | | Tanzid Hasan 84 (81); Lahiru Kumara 4/48 (8 overs) |

Bangladesh won by 4 wickets
Zohur Ahmed Chowdhury Stadium, Chattogram
Umpires: Tanvir Ahmed (Ban) and Sharfuddoula (Ban)
Player of the match: Rishad Hossain (Ban)

- Sri Lanka won the toss and elected to bat.
- Janith Liyanage (SL) scored his first century in ODIs.
- Tanzid Hasan replaced Soumya Sarkar as concussion substitute for Bangladesh during the first innings.
- Tanzid Hasan's score of 84 was the highest individual score by a concussion substitute in ODIs.
- Mushfiqur Rahim became the second Bangladeshi batter to hit 100 sixes in ODIs.

== Test series ==
=== 1st Test ===
22–26 March 2024 (Note: While five days of play were scheduled for each Test, the first Test reached a result in four days.)
Scorecard

| Sri Lanka | v | Bangladesh |
| 280 (68 overs); Kamindu Mendis 102 (127); Khaled Ahmed 3/72 (17 overs) | | 188 (51.3 overs); Taijul Islam 47 (80); Vishwa Fernando 4/48 (15.3 overs) |
| 418 (110.4 overs); Kamindu Mendis 164 (237); Mehidy Hasan Miraz 4/74 (29 overs) | | 182 (49.2 overs); Mominul Haque 87* (148); Kasun Rajitha 5/56 (14 overs) |

Sri Lanka won by 328 runs
Sylhet International Cricket Stadium, Sylhet
Umpires: Chris Gaffaney (NZ) and Richard Illingworth (Eng)
Player of the match: Dhananjaya de Silva (SL)

- Bangladesh won the toss and elected to field.
- Nahid Rana (Ban) made his Test debut.
- Kamindu Mendis (SL) scored his first century in Tests.
- Dhananjaya de Silva became first Sri Lankan captain to score twin centuries in Tests.
- Kamindu Mendis and Dhananjaya de Silva (SL) became the third pair to stand two 150+ runs partnership in same Test.
- World Test Championship points: Sri Lanka 12, Bangladesh 0

=== 2nd Test ===
30 March – 3 April 2024
Scorecard

| Sri Lanka | v | Bangladesh |
| 531 (159 overs); Kusal Mendis 93 (150); Shakib Al Hasan 3/110 (37 overs) | | 178 (68.4 overs); Zakir Hasan 54 (104); Asitha Fernando 4/34 (10.4 overs) |
| 157/7d (40 overs); Angelo Mathews 56 (74); Hasan Mahmud 4/65 (15 overs) | | 318 (85 overs); Mehidy Hasan Miraz 81* (110); Lahiru Kumara 4/50 (15 overs) |

Sri Lanka won by 192 runs
Zahur Ahmed Chowdhury Stadium, Chattogram
Umpires: Richard Illingworth (Eng) and Rod Tucker (Aus)
Player of the match: Kamindu Mendis (SL)

- Sri Lanka won the toss and elected to bat.
- Hasan Mahmud (Ban) made his Test debut.
- Sri Lanka's score of 531 in the first innings was the highest total in a Test innings without a century.
- Mominul Haque (Ban) became the fourth Bangladeshi player to complete 4000 runs in Tests.
- World Test Championship points: Sri Lanka 12, Bangladesh 0
