= Sachitha Jayathilake =

Sri Lankan cricketer (born 1997)

Personal information
- Born: 24 February 1997 (age 29); Colombo, Sri Lanka
- Batting: Right-handed
- Bowling: Right-arm leg break
- Source: Cricinfo, 24 February 2018

Sachitha Jayathilake (born 24 February 1997) is a Sri Lankan cricketer. He made his Twenty20 debut for Sri Lanka Police Sports Club in the 2017–18 SLC Twenty20 Tournament on 24 February 2018. He made his List A debut for Sri Lanka Police Sports Club in the 2017–18 Premier Limited Overs Tournament on 14 March 2018. He made his first-class debut for Kalutara Town Club in Tier B of the 2018–19 Premier League Tournament on 5 February 2019.

In November 2021, he was selected to play for the Dambulla Giants following the players' draft for the 2021 Lanka Premier League. In July 2022, he was signed by the Dambulla Giants for the third edition of the Lanka Premier League.
