= Shiraz Ahmed =

Emirati cricketer

Personal information
- Full name: Shiraz Ahmed
- Batting: Right-handed
- Bowling: Left-arm fast-medium
- Role: Bowler
- Source: Cricinfo, 8 December 2021

Shiraz Ahmed is an Emirati cricketer. In December 2021, he was named as one of the overseas players for the Kandy Warriors in the draft for the 2021 Lanka Premier League, and made his Twenty20 debut on 8 December 2021.
