= Lahiru Kumara =

Sri Lankan cricketer

Personal information
- Full name: Chandradasa Brahammana Ralalage Lahiru Sudesh Kumara
- Born: 13 February 1997 (age 29); Kandy, Sri Lanka
- Height: 184 cm (6 ft 0 in)
- Batting: Left-handed
- Bowling: Right-arm fast
- Role: Bowler

International information
- National side: Sri Lanka (2016–present)
- Test debut (cap 139): 29 October 2016 v Zimbabwe
- Last Test: 6 February 2025 v Australia
- ODI debut (cap 178): 4 February 2017 v South Africa
- Last ODI: 5 January 2025 v New Zealand
- T20I debut (cap 78): 11 January 2019 v New Zealand
- Last T20I: 8 April 2023 v New Zealand

Domestic team information
- Years: Team
- 2016-present: Nondescripts
- 2020: Dambulla Viiking
- 2021: Kandy Warriors

Career statistics
| Competition | Test | ODI | T20I | FC |
|---|---|---|---|---|
| Matches | 34 | 32 | 26 | 62 |
| Runs scored | 135 | 62 | 10 | 445 |
| Batting average | 4.65 | 5.63 | 3.33 | 8.55 |
| 100s/50s | 0/0 | 0/0 | 0/0 | 0/0 |
| Top score | 13* | 10 | 4 | 47 |
| Balls bowled | 5,810 | 1,299 | 544 | 9,629 |
| Wickets | 104 | 42 | 33 | 182 |
| Bowling average | 36.04 | 33.42 | 22.87 | 32.80 |
| 5 wickets in innings | 1 | 0 | 0 | 2 |
| 10 wickets in match | 0 | 0 | 0 | 0 |
| Best bowling | 6/122 | 4/48 | 3/7 | 6/87 |
| Catches/stumpings | 11/0 | 6/0 | 2/– | 19/– |
- Source: Cricinfo, 18 March 2025

Chandradasa Brahammana Ralalage Lahiru Sudesh Kumara (born 13 February 1997) is a Sri Lankan cricket right-arm fast bowler who plays for the Sri Lanka national team and Nondescripts. He made his senior international debut in 2016.

== Domestic career ==
Kumara made his first-class debut for Sri Lanka A against West Indies A on 4 October 2016. He made his Twenty20 debut for Nondescripts Cricket Club in the 2017–18 SLC Twenty20 Tournament on 24 February 2018.

In March 2018, Kumara was named in Kandy's squad for the 2017–18 Super Four Provincial Tournament. The following month, he was also named in Kandy's squad for the 2018 Super Provincial One Day Tournament.

In August 2018, Kumara was named in Galle's squad the 2018 SLC T20 League. In October 2020, he was drafted by the Dambulla Viiking for the inaugural edition of the Lanka Premier League. In August 2021, he was named in the SLC Greens team for the 2021 SLC Invitational T20 League tournament. In November 2021, he was selected to play for the Kandy Warriors following the players' draft for the 2021 Lanka Premier League.

== Under 19s World Cup ==
Prior to his debut, Kumara was part of Sri Lanka's squad for the 2016 Under-19 Cricket World Cup. He guided the Sri Lanka U-19s team through to the semi-final along with pacer Asitha Fernando to win the match by six wickets.

== International career ==
Kumara was selected for Sri Lanka's Test squad for their tour of Zimbabwe in October 2016. He made his Test debut for Sri Lanka against Zimbabwe on 29 October 2016. He took his maiden Test wicket by dismissing Peter Moor.

Kumara was selected in Sri Lanka's One Day International (ODI) team for Tri-Series in Zimbabwe, with West Indies being the third team.

Kumara was called up for the Test series against South Africa in 2016–17. He played in the second Test at Newlands Cricket Ground, taking his maiden Test five-wicket haul. His figures of 6 for 122 are the best bowling figures by a Sri Lankan pacer in South Africa and also the second best overall in South Africa.

In January 2017, Kumara was added to Sri Lanka's ODI squad for their series against South Africa. He made his ODI debut against South Africa on 4 February 2017 at the Wanderers Stadium, Johannesburg. He scored 5 runs in the match and took his first ODI wicket by dismissing Quinton de Kock for 8 runs.

In May 2018, Kumara was one of 33 cricketers to be awarded a national contract by Sri Lanka Cricket ahead of the 2018–19 season. In August 2018, he was named in Sri Lanka's squad for the one-off Twenty20 International (T20I) match against South Africa, but he did not play.

In November 2018, Kumara was removed from Sri Lanka's Test squad for their series against England due to disciplinary reasons.

In January 2019, Kumara was named in Sri Lanka's Twenty20 International (T20I) squad for the one-off T20I against New Zealand. He made his T20I debut in that match against New Zealand on 11 January 2019. Later the same month, Kumara sustained a hamstring injury on day two of the first Test in Brisbane against Australia. He was then ruled out of the second Test against Australia in Canberra and the tour of South Africa.

In September 2021, Kumara was named as one of four reserve players in Sri Lanka's squad for the 2021 ICC Men's T20 World Cup. But later in October 2021, he alongside three other cricketers were added to Sri Lanka's main 15 man squad. He made his Twenty20 World Cup debut against Namibia on 18 October 2021, taking 2 wickets in the match and finishing the match with the figures of 2-9 from 3.3 overs.
