= Dushmantha Chameera =

Sri Lankan cricketer (born 1992)

Personal information
- Full name: Pathira Vasan Dushmantha Chameera
- Born: 11 January 1992 (age 34); Ragama, Sri Lanka
- Height: 1.91 m (6 ft 3 in)
- Batting: Right-handed
- Bowling: Right-arm fast
- Role: Bowling all-rounder

International information
- National side: Sri Lanka (2015–present)
- Test debut (cap 129): 25 June 2015 v Pakistan
- Last Test: 21 November 2021 v West Indies
- ODI debut (cap 162): 29 January 2015 v New Zealand
- Last ODI: 31 August 2025 v Zimbabwe
- T20I debut (cap 59): 9 November 2015 v West Indies
- Last T20I: 28 September 2025 v India

Domestic team information
- Years: Team
- 2012–present: Nondescripts Cricket Club
- 2020–2021: Colombo Stars
- 2023–present: Dubai Capitals
- 2023: Lucknow Super Giants
- 2023–2024: Kandy Falcons
- 2024: Kolkata Knight Riders
- 2025–present: Delhi Capitals
- 2026–present: Dambulla Sixers
- 2026/27–present: Akcel United Kabul

Career statistics
| Competition | Test | ODI | T20I | FC |
|---|---|---|---|---|
| Matches | 12 | 56 | 64 | 45 |
| Runs scored | 104 | 289 | 102 | 270 |
| Batting average | 5.47 | 12.04 | 6.00 | 7.94 |
| 100s/50s | 0/0 | 0/0 | 0/0 | 0/0 |
| Top score | 22 | 29 | 24* | 28 |
| Balls bowled | 2,022 | 2,370 | 1,394 | 5,620 |
| Wickets | 32 | 63 | 70 | 106 |
| Bowling average | 41.28 | 34.25 | 26.70 | 34.61 |
| 5 wickets in innings | 1 | 1 | 0 | 3 |
| 10 wickets in match | 0 | 0 | 0 | 0 |
| Best bowling | 5/47 | 5/16 | 4/17 | 5/42 |
| Catches/stumpings | 5/– | 10/– | 14/– | 16/– |
- Source: ESPNcricinfo, 28 September 2025

Pathira Vasan Dushmantha Chameera (born 11 January 1992) is a professional Sri Lankan cricketer who plays for all three formats for the national team, He is a Right-arm fast bowler and also a handy lower order batsman. He plays cricket domestically for Nondescripts Cricket Club. He made his international debut for Sri Lanka in January 2015. He is currently the most experienced fast bowler in the Sri Lanka Cricket team. He missed many opportunities to play for Sri Lanka due to his injuries.

== Domestic and T20 franchise career ==
In March 2018, Chameera was named in Colombo's squad for the 2017–18 Super Four Provincial Tournament. The following month, he was also named in Colombo's squad for the 2018 Super Provincial One Day Tournament.

In August 2018, Chameera was named in Galle's squad the 2018 SLC T20 League. In March 2019, he was named in Galle's squad for the 2019 Super Provincial One Day Tournament. In October 2020, he was drafted by the Colombo Kings for the inaugural edition of the Lanka Premier League. In January 2018, he was bought by the Rajasthan Royals in the 2018 IPL auction. However, he missed the first weeks of the tournament with a back injury.

In August 2021, Chameera was included in the Royal Challengers Bangalore squad for the second phase of the 2021 Indian Premier League (IPL) in the UAE. In November 2021, he was selected to play for the Colombo Stars following the players' draft for the 2021 Lanka Premier League.

In February 2022, he was bought by the Lucknow Super Giants in the auction for the 2022 Indian Premier League tournament. He is in Kolkata Knight Rider for the IPL season 2024. In July 2022, he was signed by the Galle Gladiators for the third edition of the Lanka Premier League.

== International career ==
A right-arm fast bowler, Chameera made his ODI debut for Sri Lanka against New Zealand on 29 January 2015. He took his first international wicket in his first over when he bowled Ross Taylor, and he also dismissed Grant Elliott, with Sri Lanka winning the match.

Chameera was selected to the 2015 ICC Cricket World Cup, but did not take part in first few matches. He was picked for the squad against Sri Lanka's last pool A match against Scotland, where he took 3 wickets for 51 runs. Sri Lanka went on to win the match.

Chameera made his Test debut against Pakistan in June 2015. He received the 129th Test cap for Sri Lanka. He took his first Test wicket when he bowled Zulfiqar Babar for 5 runs. In the second innings of the same match, he guided Sri Lanka to the win by taking three wickets finishing with figures of 4/76 in 28.5 overs in both innings. He suffered a side-strain in the match and was ruled out of the third Test of the series. He made his Twenty20 International debut for Sri Lanka against the West Indies on 9 November 2015.

In May 2018, Chameera was one of 33 cricketers to be awarded a national contract by Sri Lanka Cricket ahead of the 2018–19 season. In May 2021, in the third match against Bangladesh, Chameera took his first five-wicket haul in an ODI match and he was also the man of the match in the same match. In the third ODI against South Africa on 7 September 2021, Chameera made an impressive match winning opening bowling performance. Finally, Sri Lanka won by 78 runs and Chameera adjudged man of the match as well. Later the same month, Chameera was named in Sri Lanka's squad for the 2021 ICC Men's T20 World Cup. His no-ball in a game against Australia in the T20 World Cup was described by the press as "a contender for one of the worst deliveries of all-time", "worst ball bowled", and "one of the filthiest balls you will ever witness".

In May 2024, he was named in Sri Lanka's squad for the 2024 ICC Men's T20 World Cup tournament.

== Achievements ==
- ICC Men's ODI Team of the Year: 2021
- Sri Lanka Cricket Best Men's T20I Bowler of the Year: 2025
