= Janith Liyanage =

Sri Lankan cricketer

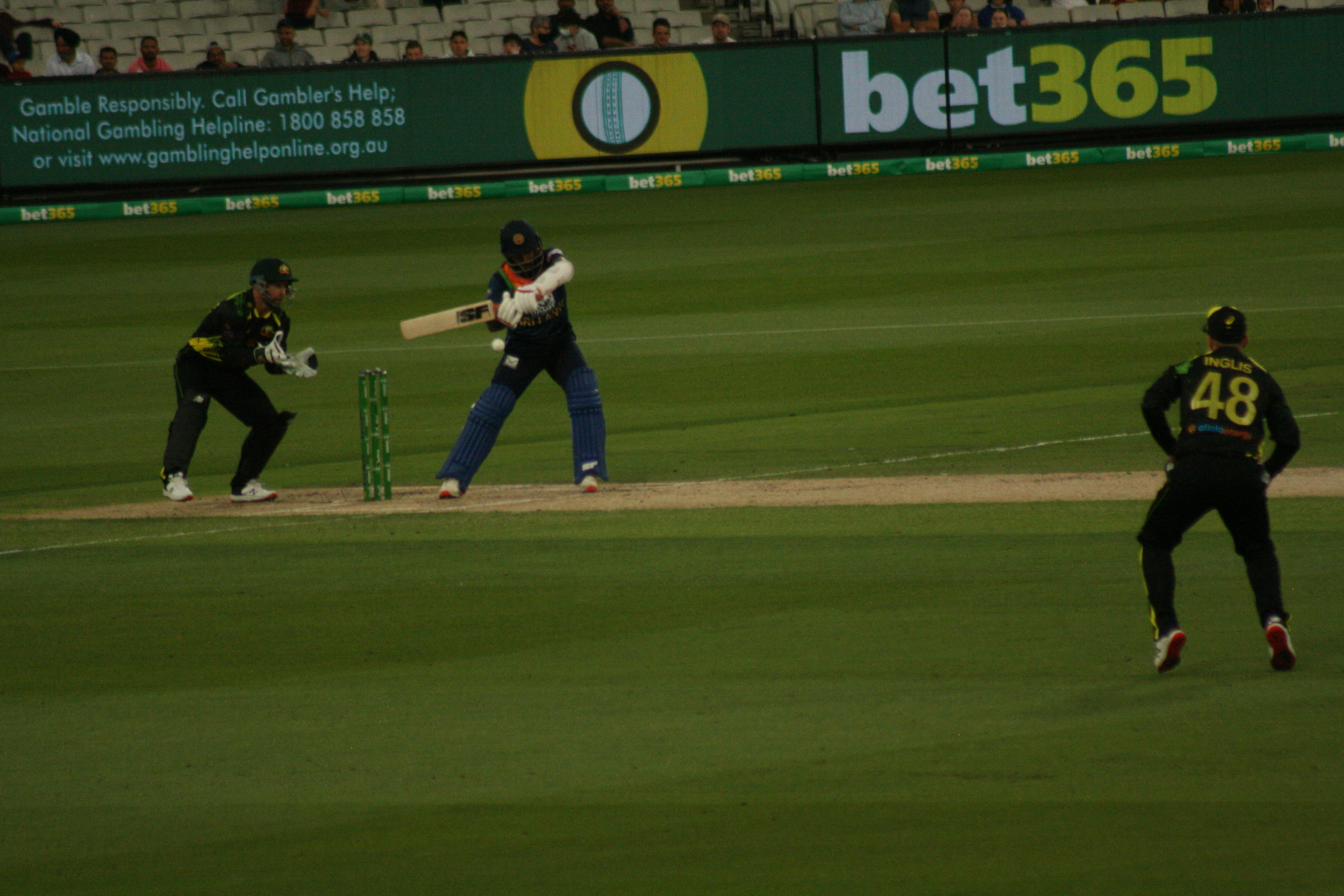

Personal information
- Full name: Kongala Liyanage Janith Vimukthi
- Born: 12 July 1995 (age 31); Colombo, Sri Lanka
- Batting: Right handed
- Bowling: Right-arm fast-medium
- Role: Batting All-rounder

International information
- National side: Sri Lanka (2022—present)
- ODI debut (cap 211): 6 January 2024 v Zimbabwe
- Last ODI: 27 September 2026 v England
- T20I debut (cap 93): 20 February 2022 v Australia
- Last T20I: 28 February 2026 v Pakistan

Career statistics
Competition	ODI	T20I	FC	LA
Matches	39	14	90	135
Runs scored	1,089	181	4,904	4,196
Batting average	41.88	22.62	38.61	41.96
100s/50s	1/7	0/0	10/31	6/26
Top score	101*	41*	140	165
Balls bowled	428	14	5,865	2,334
Wickets	4	–	90	55
Bowling average	97.00	–	37.78	37.70
5 wickets in innings	0	–	0	1
10 wickets in match	0	–	0	0
Best bowling	1/16	–	4/18	5/29
Catches/stumpings	9/–	5/–	52/–	55/–
- Source: Cricinfo, 28 September 2026

Kongala Liyanage Janith Vimukthi (born 12 July 1995), is a professional Sri Lankan cricketer who currently plays limited overs cricket for the national team. He made his international debut for the Sri Lanka cricket team in February 2022. He is a past pupil of Lalith Athulathmudali Maha Vidyalaya and St. Peter's College, Colombo.

== Domestic career ==
He made his first-class debut for Ragama Cricket Club in the 2014–15 Premier Trophy on 16 January 2015.

In March 2018, he was named in Galle's squad for the 2017–18 Super Four Provincial Tournament. The following month, he was also named in Galle's squad for the 2018 Super Provincial One Day Tournament. In November 2021, he was selected to play for the Dambulla Giants following the players' draft for the 2021 Lanka Premier League And he awarded from the emerging player of the tournament. In 2024, Liyanage got selected to play for the Galle Marvels

== International career ==
In January 2022, he was named in Sri Lanka's Twenty20 International (T20I) squad for their series against Australia. He made his T20I debut on 20 February 2022, for Sri Lanka against Australia.

He made his ODI debut during the Zimbabwe tour of Sri Lanka in 2024. In the second ODI he made 95 runs while chasing and won player of the match for his match winning performance. Sri Lanka finally won the series 2–0 and Liyanage was adjudged player of the series. In March 2024, he was selected in the ODI squad for a series against Bangladesh. In the first ODI, he scored 67 runs off 69 balls. In the third ODI, he managed to score his maiden ODI century in a losing cause.

In May 2024, he was named as a reserve player in Sri Lanka's squad for the 2024 ICC Men's T20 World Cup tournament.

== International Centuries ==
=== ODI centuries ===
No.	Score	Against	Pos.	Inn.	SR	Venue	H/A/N	Date	Result	Ref
1	101*	Bangladesh	6	1	99.01	Zahur Ahmed Chowdhury Stadium, Chattogram	Away	18 March 2024	Lost	
