= Binura Fernando =

Sri Lankan cricketer

Personal information
- Full name: Binura Fernando
- Born: 12 July 1995 (age 31); Colombo, Sri Lanka
- Nickname: Ragama Rambo
- Height: 6 ft 6 in (1.98 m)
- Batting: Right-handed
- Bowling: Left arm medium fast
- Role: Bowler

International information
- National side: Sri Lanka (2015–present)
- ODI debut (cap 195): 28 May 2021 v Bangladesh
- Last ODI: 4 July 2021 v England
- ODI shirt no.: 71
- T20I debut (cap 54): 30 July 2015 v Pakistan
- Last T20I: 7 September 2025 v Zimbabwe
- T20I shirt no.: 71

Domestic team information
- Years: Team
- SSC
- 2020: Jaffna Stallions
- 2021: Kandy Warriors
- 2025/26: Rajshahi Warriors
- 2026: Nottinghamshire

Career statistics
Competition	ODI	T20I	FC	LA
Matches	4	25	29	59
Runs scored	26	43	800	344
Batting average	8.66	10.75	24.24	14.33
100s/50s	0/0	0/0	0/5	0/1
Top score	17	20	82	61
Balls bowled	152	511	3,605	2,488
Wickets	2	24	70	70
Bowling average	68.00	29.83	24.51	27.51
5 wickets in innings	0	0	2	1
10 wickets in match	0	0	1	0
Best bowling	1/33	3/31	9/70	6/28
Catches/stumpings	1/–	4/–	7/–	10/–
Medal record
Men's cricket
Representing Sri Lanka
Asian Games
Bronze medal – third place	2026 Aichi–Nagoya	Team
- Source: ESPNcricinfo, 17 July 2026

Binura Fernando (born 12 July 1995) is a professional Sri Lankan cricketer who plays for the Sri Lanka national team in limited over internationals.

== Early and domestic career ==
He was part of Sri Lanka's squad for the 2014 ICC Under-19 Cricket World Cup. In August 2018, he was named in Dambulla's squad the 2018 SLC T20 League. In October 2020, he was drafted by the Jaffna Stallions for the inaugural edition of the Lanka Premier League. In August 2021, he was named in the SLC Reds team for the 2021 SLC Invitational T20 League tournament. In November 2021, he was selected to play for the Kandy Warriors following the players' draft for the 2021 Lanka Premier League. In July 2022, he was signed by the Jaffna Kings for the third edition of the Lanka Premier League.

== International career ==
He was named in Sri Lanka's Twenty20 International (T20I) squad for their series against Pakistan in July 2015. He made his T20I debut on 30 July 2015. He took his first international wicket by bowling Shahid Afridi.

In May 2021, he was named in Sri Lanka's One Day International (ODI) squad for their series against Bangladesh. He made his ODI debut for Sri Lanka on 28 May 2021, against Bangladesh. In September 2021, Fernando was named as one of four reserve players in Sri Lanka's squad for the 2021 ICC Men's T20 World Cup.

== Playing Style ==
He is known for his ability to generate awkward bounce from a height of 6'7", and swing the ball.
