= Avishka Fernando =

Sri Lankan cricketer (born 1998)

Personal information
- Full name: Weerahandige Inol Avishka Fernando
- Born: 5 April 1998 (age 28); Wadduwa, Sri Lanka
- Batting: Right-handed
- Bowling: Right-arm medium-fast
- Role: Batsman

International information
- National side: Sri Lanka (2016–Present)
- ODI debut (cap 175): 31 August 2016 v Australia
- Last ODI: 12 February 2025 v Australia
- T20I debut (cap 79): 19 March 2019 v South Africa
- Last T20I: 2 January 2025 v New Zealand

Domestic team information
- Years: Team
- 2018–present: Colts Cricket Club
- 2019–present: Chittagong Vikings
- 2019, 2024: Chattogram Challengers
- 2020–2022; 2024–present: Jaffna Kings
- 2023: Dambulla Aura
- 2025–present: Sharjah Warriorz

Career statistics
| Competition | ODI | T20I | FC | LA |
|---|---|---|---|---|
| Matches | 51 | 37 | 39 | 119 |
| Runs scored | 1,589 | 363 | 2,183 | 4,286 |
| Batting average | 31.78 | 11.00 | 37.00 | 38.26 |
| 100s/50s | 4/9 | 0/0 | 5/9 | 13/19 |
| Top score | 127 | 37 | 223 | 139 |
| Catches/stumpings | 20/– | 8/– | 32/– | 48/– |
- Source: ESPNCricinfo, 4 April 2025

Weerahandige Inol Avishka Fernando (born 5 April 1998), commonly as Avishka Fernando, is a professional Sri Lankan cricketer, who currently plays limited over internationals for Sri Lanka national team. He plays for Colts Cricket Club in domestic cricket, and he made his international debut for the Sri Lanka cricket team in August 2016. He had his education in St. Sebastian's College, Moratuwa.

== Youth and domestic career ==
Avishka Fernando has the record for scoring the most runs in Youth ODI history for Sri Lanka (1379 runs) He too has the record for scoring the most centuries for Sri Lanka in Youth ODI history(4).

He was also the part of the Sri Lankan team which won the ACC Emerging teams asia cup 2017 by defeating Pakistan by 5 wickets.

He made his Twenty20 debut for Colts Cricket Club in the 2017–18 SLC Twenty20 Tournament on 24 February 2018.

In April 2018, he was named in Kandy's squad for the 2018 Super Provincial One Day Tournament. In August 2018, he was named in Colombo's squad the 2018 SLC T20 League. In March 2019, he was named in Colombo's squad for the 2019 Super Provincial One Day Tournament. In November 2019, he was selected to play for the Chattogram Challengers in the 2019–20 Bangladesh Premier League.

He hit 95 from 96 balls in Sri Lanka's victory over England in the quarter-final of the 2016 Under-19 World Cup, and later in the year would hit two consecutive hundreds against the same opposition, this time in a bilateral series in England. Sri Lanka U-19s whitewashed England U-19s for the first time in England as well.

== T20 & List-A career ==
=== Lanka Premier league ===
In October 2020, he was drafted by the Jaffna Stallions for the inaugural edition of the Lanka Premier League.

In the first match of Jaffna Stallions with Galle Gladiators, Avishka scored match winning 92* of 63 while chasing 175 hitting 5 4s and 7 6s guiding 8 wicket win for the team and as a result won player of the match award.

On 9th match, Avishka scored another match winning half century against same opposition. He scored 84 runs from 59 balls hitting seven boundaries and five sixes. Courtesy of his knock, Jaffna Stallions easily chased down 170 target and won the match by 5 wickets. Avishka won player of the match award for his performance. He was the 4th highest run scorer in that season, scoring 275 runs in 8 innings with the average of 39.28 including 2 50s.

=== SLC Twenty ===
On 18 March 2021, semi final of 2020-21 SLC Twenty-20 Tournament, Avishka scored match winning 65 runs from 48 balls against Colombo Cricket Club. He hit three boundaries and four sixes in his innings. Finally Sinhalese Sports Club won the match by 32 runs.

In March 2021, he was part of the Sinhalese Sports Club team that won the 2020–21 SLC Twenty20 Tournament, the first time they had won the tournament since 2005. On 1 April 2021, Major Clubs Limited Over tournament, Avishka scored match winning century. He scored 132 runs hitting 13 boundaries and 5 sixes from 106 balls. He put a strong partnership with Charith Asalanka who scored a century too. Finally Sinhalese Sports Club chased down the target of 278 runs. Sinhalese Sports Club won the match by 8 wickets and 68 balls remaining.

In August 2021, he was named as the vice-captain of the SLC Reds team for the 2021 SLC Invitational T20 League tournament. On 16 August 2021, SLC Invitational T20 League, Avishka scored unbeaten 82 runs from 58 balls and guided SLC team to 10 wicket victory. He put strong opening partnership with Dinesh Chandimal. He hit four boundaries and six sixes in his innings.

In November 2021, he was selected to play for the Jaffna Kings following the players' draft for the 2021 Lanka Premier League. On 8 December 2021, against Kandy Warriors Avishka scored his 12th half century in T20 cricket, his 3rd half century in Lanka Premiere League, first one in this edition. Match was interrupted with the rain and limited to 14 overs per side. He scored 53 runs from 23 balls hitting seven sixes. During that innings he hit five consecutive sixes in one single over against Tillakaratne Sampath. He also put 105 run partnership with Jaffna Kings captain Thisara Perera, who also scored a half century. Finally Jaffna Kings won the match by 14 runs.

On 21 December 2021, against Dambulla Giants, Avishka scored his first T20 century scoring 100 runs. He is the first person to score century in this LPL season and first Sri Lankan to do so, second cricketer overall. Avishka shared 122 runs for the first wicket with Rahmanullah Gurbaz. Courtesy of 64 ball century Jaffna Kings won the match and Avishka won player of the match award.

His good form continued in the final of Lanka Premiere League on 23 December 2021. He scored quick 63 runs from 41 balls hitting 8 fours and 2 sixes and his innings help to put 201 runs on the board against Galle Gladiators. Finally Jaffna Kings won the match by 23 runs and became champions. Avishka won player of the match and Player of the tournament awards for his performance throughout the series.

He ended the series as the second highest run scorer in the series scoring 312 runs in 10 innings with average of 34.66 including two half centuries and one century.

During 3rd edition of LPL on 7 December 2022, against Dambulla Aura Avishka scored his 14th T20 half century. Fifth half century in LPL. He scored 51 runs from 49 balls hitting four boundaries and one six. Finally Jaffna Kings won the match by 9 wickets.

On 11 December 2022, against Dambulla Aura Avishka scored his 15th T20 half century. Sixth half century in LPL. He scored 54 runs from 30 balls hitting six boundaries and two sixes. Finally Jaffna kings won the match by 51 runs.

On 23 December 2022, Finals against Colombo Stars, Avishka Fernando scored his 16th T20 half century. 7th half century in LPL and third one in this edition. He scored 50 runs from 43 balls hitting four boundaries and one six. His knock helped to chase down the target and won LPL trophy for the third time. Due to his knock Avishka Fernando won player of the match award.

On 13 July 2023, during ACC Emerging Teams Asia Cup, against Bangladesh A team, Avishka Fernando scored his 9th List A century. He scored 133 runs from 124 deliveries hitting 13 boundaries and three sixes. Finally Sri Lanka A team won the match by 48 runs. Due to his performance, Avishka won player of the match award.

=== Major Clubs Limited Over ===
On 17 December 2023 against NCC, Avishka scored 100 off 79 balls with 7 4s and 6 6s, being his 10th List A century and as a result SSC won the match by 14 runs.

On 14 January 2024 against Colts Cricket Club, he scored 125* off 138 balls, his 11th List A century, guiding the team for the victory.

== International career ==
As an 18-year-old, he has been picked in Sri Lankan ODI squad for their home series against Australia. He earned his first call-up to the national ODI team without having played any T20 or List A or first-class cricket. He made his One Day International debut for Sri Lanka against Australia on 31 August 2016 at Dambulla. He was dismissed for a duck after facing two balls from Mitchell Starc.

In December 2018, he was named in Sri Lanka team for the 2018 ACC Emerging Teams Asia Cup. He made his Twenty20 International debut for Sri Lanka against South Africa on 19 March 2019.

In April 2019, he was named in Sri Lanka's squad for the 2019 Cricket World Cup. He played as the opening partner for skipper Dimuth Karunaratne in ODI series against Scotland prior to the World Cup. In the second ODI, he scored his maiden ODI fifty. Sri Lanka won the match by 35 runs in DLS method.

In his first World Cup appearance, he scored 49 runs against England. His stroke play against England pacer Jofra Archer with 24 off 15 balls was described by former Sri Lankan batsman Kumar Sangakkara as, "He's got timing, this boy!" on TV commentary. Sri Lanka won the match by 20 runs to continue fourth consecutive World Cup win over England. On 1 July 2019, in the match against the West Indies, he scored his first century in ODIs, becoming the 27th Sri Lankan to score a century. Sri Lanka won the match by 20 runs and Fernando won his first man of the match award. Following the World Cup, the International Cricket Council (ICC) named Fernando as the rising star of the squad.

During the second ODI against Bangladesh, he scored a match-winning knock 82 off 75 balls to win the match by 7 wickets. With that match, Sri Lanka won the series 2-0 which was recorded as their first win after 44 months on home soil. Fernando won man of the match award for his batting performance. He was named in Sri Lanka's squad for tour of Pakistan in September 2019. He scored only 4 runs in the two matches against Pakistan where Sri Lanka lost the series 2–0.

On 25 February 2020 against West Indies, Fernando scored his second ODI century. He along with Kusal Mendis put a 239-run partnership for the third wicket. This is the highest third wicket partnership for Sri Lanka in ODIs. Fernando scored 127 runs and Mendis scored 119 runs to post an imposing total of 345, which is recorded as the highest ODI total without hitting a six. West Indies collapse in the chase and Sri Lanka won the match by 161 runs. This is the biggest win in terms of runs against Windies by Sri Lanka in ODIs as well. With this win, Sri Lanka won the series 2–0 to give them an unassailable lead in the series. Fernando won the man of the match award for match-winning batting performance.

On 23 July 2021 against India, he scored his 5th ODI half century and guided victory for Sri Lanka. This was his second consecutive half century in the series and he put century partnership with Bhanuka Rajapaksa. He won player of the match award for his performance. On 2 September 2021 in the first ODI against South Africa, he scored his third ODI century and helped Sri Lanka to post a total of 301 in 50 overs. Finally, Sri Lanka won the match by 14 runs and Avishka was adjudged as the man of the match. Eventually, Sri Lanka won the ODI series 2–1. Later the same month, Fernando was named in Sri Lanka's squad for the 2021 ICC Men's T20 World Cup.

On 7 October 2021, 1st T20 match against Oman, Avishka scored a half century. He scored unbeaten 83 runs and put strong partnership with captain Dasun Shanaka, who smashed 51 off 24. The pair put 112 off the final 56 balls. Finally, Sri Lanka won the match by 19 runs. Their first warm-up match in Abu Dhabi against Bangladesh, Sri Lanka won by four wickets with an over to spare. Avishka top scorer with bat scoring unbeaten 62 runs from 42 balls while chasing 147 runs. His fine form continued in the next warm up match. Second match against Papua New Guinea Avishka scored another half century. He scored 61 runs from 37 balls hitting two boundaries and four sixes. He put a strong partnership with Pathum Nissanka. Finally Sri Lanka won the match by 39 runs.

On 9 February 2024, against Afghanistan, Avishka scored his 6th ODI half century. In that process he scored his 1000 ODI runs. He scored 88 from 88 balls and put 182 opening partnership with Pathum Nissanka. In the third ODI, he scored 91 runs and made 173-run opening partnership with Nissanka, and Sri Lanka eventually won the match and series 3–0.
