= Chaturanga de Silva =

Sri Lankan cricketer (born 1990)

Personal information
- Full name: Pinanduwage Chathuranaga de silva
- Born: 17 January 1990 (age 36); Galle, Sri Lanka
- Height: 5 ft 6 in (168 cm)
- Batting: Left-handed
- Bowling: Slow left-arm orthodox
- Role: All-rounder
- Relatives: Wanindu Hasaranga, (brother)

International information
- National side: Sri Lanka (2014–2017)
- ODI debut (cap 159): 25 February 2014 v Pakistan
- Last ODI: 1 February 2017 v South Africa
- ODI shirt no.: 50
- T20I debut (cap 73): 29 October 2017 v Pakistan
- Last T20I: 22 December 2017 v India

Domestic team information
- Years: Team
- Chilaw Marians Cricket Club
- Moors Sports Club
- Jaffna Stallions
- Fortune Barishal
- Durdanto Dhaka

Career statistics
Competition	ODI	T20I	FC	LA
Matches	7	2	101	182
Runs scored	94	22	5,660	3,467
Batting average	15.66	11.00	40.42	24.94
100s/50s	0/0	0/0	10/38	4/17
Top score	44	21	154	118*
Balls bowled	316	12	12,295	7,037
Wickets	5	0	253	214
Bowling average	51.20	–	26.69	23.93
5 wickets in innings	0	–	14	6
10 wickets in match	0	–	1	0
Best bowling	2/29	–	7/62	6/35
Catches/stumpings	4/–	1/–	61/–	59/–
Medal record
Representing Sri Lanka
Men's Cricket
Asian Games
Gold medal – first place	2014 Incheon	Team
- Source: ESPNcricinfo, 22 March 2025

Pinnaduwage Chaturanga de Silva (born 17 January 1990), or Chaturanga de Silva, is a Sri Lankan professional cricketer who represented his country at international level in limited overs cricket. He is primarily a left-handed batsman but bowls handy slow left-arm orthodox. He continues to play domestic and franchise cricket around the world. Chathuranga de Silva was educated at St. Aloysius College, Galle, where he started his cricket career. He is the elder brother of Sri Lankan All-rounder Wanindu Hasaranga de Silva.

== Personal life ==
His younger brother Wanindu Hasaranga is also a limited overs cricketer, who debuted on 2 July 2017 against Zimbabwe.

== Domestic career ==
In March 2018, he was named in Galle's squad for the 2017–18 Super Four Provincial Tournament. The following month, he was also named in Galle's squad for the 2018 Super Provincial One Day Tournament.

In August 2018, he was named in Colombo's squad the 2018 SLC T20 League. In February 2019, Sri Lanka Cricket named him as the Player of the Tournament of the 2017–18 SLC Twenty20 Tournament. In March 2019, he was named in Kandy's squad for the 2019 Super Provincial One Day Tournament. In October 2020, he was drafted by the Jaffna Stallions for the inaugural edition of the Lanka Premier League. In August 2021, he was named in the SLC Greys team for the 2021 SLC Invitational T20 League tournament. In November 2021, he was selected to play for the Jaffna Kings following the players' draft for the 2021 Lanka Premier League. In July 2022, he was signed by the Dambulla Giants for the third edition of the Lanka Premier League.

== International career ==
De Silva was first selected in the Sri Lankan squad for the series against South Africa. He made his ODI debut for Sri Lanka against Pakistan in the Asia Cup on 25 February 2014. In the match, he took four wickets in a winning course. Then in the next match against Bangladesh, he scored 44 runs.

He was named in Sri Lanka's Twenty20 International (T20I) squad for their series against Pakistan in July 2015, but did not play any match. In October 2017, he was named in Sri Lanka's T20I squad for their series against Pakistan. He made his T20I debut for Sri Lanka against Pakistan on 29 October 2017.
