= Nuwan Thushara =

Sri Lankan cricketer (born 1994)

Personal information
- Full name: Ilandari Dewage Nuwan Thushara
- Born: 6 August 1994 (age 32); Thalawa, Sri Lanka
- Batting: Right handed
- Bowling: Right arm medium-fast
- Role: Bowler

International information
- National side: Sri Lanka (2022–present)
- T20I debut (cap 92): 13 February 2022 v Australia
- Last T20I: 26 September 2025 v India

Domestic team information
- Years: Team
- 2020–2022: Galle Gladiators
- 2023: Jaffna Kings
- 2023: Quetta Gladiators
- 2024: MI Cape Town
- 2024: Fortune Barishal
- 2024: Mumbai Indians
- 2024: Dambulla Sixers
- 2025–present: Royal Challengers Bengaluru
- 2025/26: Gulf Giants
- 2026: Kandy Royals

Career statistics
Competition	T20I	FC	LA	T20
Matches	28	5	40	111
Runs scored	9	2	10	40
Batting average	4.50	0.66	2.50	4.00
100s/50s	0/0	0/0	0/0	0/0
Top score	6	1*	4*	7*
Balls bowled	569	312	1,253	2,151
Wickets	36	2	46	151
Bowling average	20.94	118.50	22.69	19.06
5 wickets in innings	1	0	0	2
10 wickets in match	0	0	0	0
Best bowling	5/20	2/37	4/35	5/13
Catches/stumpings	2/–	1/–	5/–	13/–
Medal record
Men's cricket
Representing Sri Lanka
Asian Games
Bronze medal – third place	2026 Aichi–Nagoya	Team
- Source: Cricinfo, 28 September 2025

Ilandari Dewage Nuwan Thushara (born 6 August 1994) is a professional Sri Lankan cricketer currently plays T20Is for the national team. A fast bowler with a slinging action, similar to that of Lasith Malinga, Thushara made his international debut for the Sri Lanka cricket team in February 2022 against Australia. He is a past pupil of Thalawa Kanitu Vidyalaya, Alpitiya.

== Domestic and franchise career ==
He made his first-class debut for Sinhalese Sports Club in the 2015–16 Premier League Tournament on 26 December 2015. He made his List A debut for Colombo Cricket Club in the 2017–18 Premier Limited Overs Tournament on 10 March 2018. In October 2020, he was drafted by the Galle Gladiators for the inaugural edition of the Lanka Premier League. In August 2021, he was named in the SLC Greens team for the 2021 SLC Invitational T20 League tournament. In November 2021, he was selected to play for the Galle Gladiators following the players' draft for the 2021 Lanka Premier League.

In July 2022, he was signed by the Galle Gladiators for the third edition of the Lanka Premier League.

Nuwan was acquired by IPL franchise Mumbai Indians in IPL 2024 auction for 4.8 crores INR.

== International career ==
In January 2022, he was named in Sri Lanka's One Day International (ODI) squad for their series against Zimbabwe. Later the month, he was named in Sri Lanka's Twenty20 International (T20I) squad for their away series against Australia. He made his T20I debut on 13 February 2022, for Sri Lanka against Australia. In June 2022, he was named in Sri Lanka's One Day International (ODI) squad for their home series against Australia.

In February 2024, he was named in Sri Lanka's T20I squad for their tour to Bangladesh. On 9 March 2024, during the third T20I, he took his first hat-trick in T20Is and became the fifth Sri Lankan bowler to do so. He also picked up his maiden five-wicket haul in T20Is.

In May 2024, he was named in Sri Lanka’s squad for the 2024 ICC Men's T20 World Cup tournament.
