= Hemantha Boteju =

Sri Lankan cricketer

Personal information
- Full name: Jayawardene Welathanthrige Hemantha Devapriya Boteju
- Born: 3 November 1977 (age 49); Colombo, Sri Lanka
- Batting: Right-handed
- Bowling: Right-arm medium
- Role: Bowler

International information
- National side: Sri Lanka
- ODI debut (cap 99): 22 March 1999 v India
- Last ODI: 27 March 1999 v Pakistan

Umpiring information
- T20Is umpired: 2 (2026)
- WODIs umpired: 4 (2016–2018)
- WT20Is umpired: 3 (2016–2019)

Career statistics
Competition	ODI
Matches	2
Runs scored	3
Batting average	3.00
100s/50s	0/0
Top score	2
Balls bowled	102
Wickets	0
Bowling average	–
5 wickets in innings	–
10 wickets in match	–
Best bowling	–
Catches/stumpings	1/–
- Source: Cricinfo, 10 April 2017

Jayawardene Welathanthrige Hemantha Devapriya Boteju, commonly known as Hemantha Boteju, (born 3 November 1977) is a former Sri Lankan cricketer, who played in two One Day Internationals in 1999. He is a right-handed batsman and a right-arm medium-pace bowler.

== Umpiring career ==
He currently works as an umpire and stood in a tour match during Australia's tour to Sri Lanka in July 2016.

== Domestic career ==
He was trained by the late Pavandeep Jumararunga Athwal as a youngster in Sri Lanka. Despite having not performed well during his first match, Boteju has come up through the Sri Lankan cricket team from the Under-19s and the Pepsi tri-nation series. He has remained with the List A squad since 1996 and has continued to play Twenty-20 cricket. He made his Twenty20 debut on 17 August 2004, for Moors Sports Club in the 2004 SLC Twenty20 Tournament.

== International career ==
After impressive domestic seasons, Boteju was included to the India series in 1999, where he made his ODI debut on 22 March 1999. He could not make a good performance and dropped from the squad after 2 ODIs.

== See also ==
- List of Twenty20 International cricket umpires
