= Jayden Seales =

West Indian cricketer

Personal information
- Full name: Jayden Nigel Tristen Seales
- Born: 10 September 2001 (age 25); Trinidad and Tobago
- Batting: Left-handed
- Bowling: Right-arm fast-medium
- Role: Bowler
- Relatives: Jalarnie Seales (cousin)

International information
- National side: West Indies (2021–present)
- Test debut (cap 326): 10 June 2021 v South Africa
- Last Test: 18 December 2025 v New Zealand
- ODI debut (cap 212): 4 June 2022 v Netherlands
- Last ODI: 22 November 2025 v New Zealand
- T20I debut (cap 100): 19 December 2024 v Bangladesh
- Last T20I: 13 November 2025 v New Zealand

Domestic team information
- Years: Team
- 2020–2024: Trinbago Knight Riders
- 2020/21–present: Trinidad and Tobago
- 2021: Jaffna Kings
- 2024–2025: Sussex (squad no. 14)
- 2025: Antigua and Barbuda Falcons

Career statistics
Competition	Test	ODI	T20I	FC
Matches	26	29	6	52
Runs scored	235	56	4	458
Batting average	8.70	9.33	4.00	9.34
100s/50s	0/0	0/0	0/0	0/0
Top score	32	29*	4*	33
Balls bowled	4,329	1,231	126	8,030
Wickets	95	40	6	173
Bowling average	25.87	30.07	35.66	26.57
5 wickets in innings	3	1	0	6
10 wickets in match	0	–	–	0
Best bowling	6/61	6/18	3/32	6/61
Catches/stumpings	10/–	7/–	2/–	18/–
- Source: ESPNCricinfo, 29 December 2025

Jayden Nigel Tristen Seales (born 10 September 2001) is a Trinidadian professional cricket right-arm fast-medium bowler who plays for the West Indies and Trinidad and Tobago. As of June 2026, he is signed with Antigua and Barbuda Falcons in the Caribbean Premier League. Seales made his senior international debut for the West Indies in 2021.

== Career ==
He made his Twenty20 debut on 18 August 2020, for the Trinbago Knight Riders in the 2020 Caribbean Premier League, taking one wicket in the match. Prior to his T20 debut, he was named in the West Indies' squad for the 2020 Under-19 Cricket World Cup. He made his first-class debut on 11 December 2020, for the West Indies A against New Zealand A, during the West Indies tour of New Zealand. He made his List A debut on 17 February 2021, for Trinidad and Tobago, in the 2020–21 Super50 Cup.

In March 2021, Cricket West Indies (CWI) named Seales as a developmental player for the first Test match against Sri Lanka. In June 2021, Seales was named in a 17-man provisional squad for the Test series against South Africa. Prior to his selection, Seales had only played in ten professional matches, including just one first-class fixture. On 8 June 2021, CWI named Seales in the squad for the first Test against South Africa. On being named in the squad, Seales said that it was a "a dream come true" and hoped that he would be selected for the match. Seales made his Test debut against South Africa on 6 June 2021. Despite a heavy defeat for the West Indies in the match, Seales took three wickets, including a wicket in the first over he bowled.

In August 2021, in the first match against Pakistan, Seales took his first five-wicket haul in Test cricket, with 5/55 in the second innings. In doing so, he became the youngest cricketer from the West Indies to take a five-wicket haul in Tests, breaking Alf Valentine's record set in 1950.

In November 2021, he was selected to play for the Jaffna Kings following the players' draft for the 2021 Lanka Premier League.

In December 2021, he was named in the West Indies' One Day International (ODI) squad for their series against Ireland. In May 2022, he was named in the West Indies ODI squads for their series against the Netherlands and Pakistan. He made his ODI debut on 4 June 2022, for the West Indies against the Netherlands.

During the second test match against Sri Lanka, Seales became the second fastest West Indian to reach 100 career test wickets in terms of balls bowled.
