= Raveendra Wimalasiri =

Sri Lankan cricketer and umpire

Personal information
- Full name: Raja Raveendra Wimalasiri
- Born: 19 August 1969 (age 57); Colombo, Sri Lanka
- Role: Umpire

Umpiring information
- Tests umpired: 1 (2023)
- ODIs umpired: 46 (2013–2026)
- T20Is umpired: 53 (2013–2026)
- WODIs umpired: 15 (2018–2023)
- WT20Is umpired: 13 (2015–2022)

Career statistics
Competition	FC	LA
Matches	86	26
Runs scored	3,331	326
Batting average	26.22	14.81
100s/50s	2/21	0/1
Top score	103*	74*
Balls bowled	1,973	41
Wickets	37	1
Bowling average	31.29	41.00
5 wickets in innings	0	0
10 wickets in match	0	–
Best bowling	3/22	1/23
Catches/stumpings	66/–	9/–
- Source: Cricinfo, 24 June 2023

Raja Raveendra Wimalasiri (Sinhala: රාජා රවීන්ද්‍ර විමලසිරි; born 19 August 1969) is a Sri Lankan cricket umpire and former cricketer. He stood in his first One Day International, between Sri Lanka and South Africa, on 23 July 2013 and his first Twenty20 International on 2 August 2013, also between the same teams.

In October 2019, he was appointed as one of the twelve umpires to officiate matches in the 2019 ICC T20 World Cup Qualifier tournament in the United Arab Emirates. In January 2020, he was named as one of the sixteen umpires for the 2020 Under-19 Cricket World Cup tournament in South Africa.

== See also ==
- List of Test cricket umpires
- List of One Day International cricket umpires
- List of Twenty20 International cricket umpires
