= Lyndon Hannibal =

Sri Lankan cricketer and umpire (born 1965)

Personal information
- Full name: Lyndon Edward Hannibal
- Born: 20 November 1965 (age 60); Colombo, Sri Lanka
- Role: Umpire

Umpiring information
- ODIs umpired: 21 (2018–2024)
- T20Is umpired: 24 (2018–2024)
- WODIs umpired: 13 (2008–2024)
- WT20Is umpired: 4 (2013–2018)

Career statistics
| Competition | FC | LA |
|---|---|---|
| Matches | 34 | 2 |
| Runs scored | 406 | – |
| Batting average | 11.94 | – |
| 100s/50s | 0/1 | –/– |
| Top score | 82 | – |
| Balls bowled | 3,749 | – |
| Wickets | 95 | 5 |
| Bowling average | 22.08 | 14.00 |
| 5 wickets in innings | 2 | 0 |
| 10 wickets in match | 1 | – |
| Best bowling | 8/38 | 3/32 |
| Catches/stumpings | 19/– | 0/– |
- Source: Cricinfo, 17 February 2026

Lyndon Hannibal (born 20 November 1965) is a Sri Lankan international cricket umpire and a former first class cricketer.

== Umpiring career ==
He stood as an umpire in the tour match between Sri Lanka Board President's XI vs Indian national cricket team in August 2015. He made his Twenty20 International (T20I) umpiring debut in a match between Bangladesh and India in the 2018 Nidahas Trophy, on 8 March 2018. His One Day International (ODI) umpiring debut was in a match between Sri Lanka and South Africa, on 8 August 2018. He was one of the twelve umpires to officiate matches in the 2019 ICC T20 World Cup Qualifier tournament in the United Arab Emirates. In 2021, he officiated in a Test series for the first time, as third umpire in the series between Sri Lanka and England.

=== 2024 Dambulla controversy ===
Hannibal officiated the 2023–24 Afghan tour of Sri Lanka. During the third T20I match, on the fourth delivery of the twentieth over in Sri Lanka's innings Hannibal standing at the square leg, did not call an above-waist-high no-ball by bowler Wafadar Momand to batsman Kamindu Mendis. Sri Lanka needed eleven runs from the last three deliveries at that stage. During the post-match press, Sri Lankan captain Wanindu Hasaranga complained about the decision. Hasaranga received a 50 percent fine and a two-match suspension subsequently.

== See also ==
- List of One Day International cricket umpires
- List of Twenty20 International cricket umpires
