= Prageeth Rambukwella =

Sri Lankan cricket umpire (born 1976)

Personal information
- Full name: Rambukkana Maggonage Prageeth Jayashantha Rambukwella
- Born: 22 January 1976 (age 50); Moratuwa, Sri Lanka
- Batting: Right-handed

Umpiring information
- Tests umpired: 1 (2025)
- ODIs umpired: 7 (2022–2025)
- T20Is umpired: 24 (2019–2025)
- WODIs umpired: 10 (2008–2022)
- WT20Is umpired: 7 (2011–2024)

Career statistics
Competition	FC	LA
Matches	7	9
Runs scored	107	120
Batting average	10.70	15.00
100s/50s	0/0	0/0
Top score	26	37
Catches/stumpings	20/2	11/2
- Source: ESPNcricinfo, 1 July 2025

Prageeth Rambukwella (born 22 January 1976) is a Sri Lankan umpire and former cricketer.

Rambukwella played seven first-class and nine List A matches from 1995 to 2002. He is a member of the International Panel of ICC Umpires. He stood in a tour match between Sri Lanka and Pakistan in June 2015.

He stood in his first Twenty20 International (T20I) on 1 September 2019, between Sri Lanka and New Zealand and his first One Day International (ODI), between Sri Lanka and Zimbabwe, on 21 January 2022. Prageeth was educated at Nalanda College, Colombo.

== See also ==
- List of Test cricket umpires
- List of One Day International cricket umpires
- List of Twenty20 International cricket umpires
