= List of Sri Lanka Twenty20 International cricket records =

A Twenty20 International (T20I) is a form of cricket, played between two of the international members of the International Cricket Council (ICC), in which each team faces a maximum of twenty overs. The matches have top-class status and are the highest T20 standard. The game is played under the rules of Twenty20 cricket. The first Twenty20 International match between two men's sides was played on 17 February 2005, involving Australia and New Zealand. Wisden Cricketers' Almanack reported that "neither side took the game especially seriously", and it was noted by Cricinfo that but for a large score for Ricky Ponting, "the concept would have shuddered". However, Ponting himself said "if it does become an international game then I'm sure the novelty won't be there all the time". This is a list of Sri Lanka Cricket team's Twenty20 International records. It is based on the List of Twenty20 International records, but concentrates solely on records dealing with the Sri Lankan cricket team. Sri Lanka played the first ever T20I in 2006.

== Key ==
The top five records are listed for each category, except for the team wins, losses, draws and ties, all round records and the partnership records. Tied records for fifth place are also included. Explanations of the general symbols and cricketing terms used in the list are given below. Specific details are provided in each category where appropriate. All records include matches played for Sri Lanka only, and are correct as of August 2020.

Key
Symbol	Meaning
†	Player or umpire is currently active in T20I cricket
‡	Even took place during a World Cup
*	Player remained not out or partnership remained unbroken
	Twenty20 International cricket record
Date	Starting date of the match
Innings	Number of innings played
Matches	Number of matches played
Opposition	The team Sri Lanka was playing against
Period	The time period when the player was active in ODI cricket
Player	The player involved in the record
Venue	Twenty20 International cricket ground where the match was played

== Team records ==
=== Overall record ===
	Matches	Won	Lost	Tied	NR	Win %
2006-2026	228	102	118	6	2	46.01%
2016-2026	161	60	95	5	1	37.27%
2006-2015	67	42	23	1	1	64.39%
	Last Updated: 16 February 2026					

=== Team wins, losses, draws and ties ===
As of February 2026, Sri Lanka has played 232 T20I matches resulting in 102 victories, 122 defeats, 6 ties and 2 no results for an overall winning percentage of 45.21.

Opponent	Matches	Won	Lost	Tied	No Result	% Won	First	Last
Full Members
Afghanistan	9	6	3	0	0	66.66	2016	2025
Australia	27	11	15	1	0	40.74	2007	2026
Bangladesh	22	13	9	0	0	59.09	2007	2025
England	18	4	14	0	0	22.22	2006	2026
India	33	9	21	2	1	28.12	2009	2025
Ireland	4	4	0	0	0	100.00	2009	2026
New Zealand	29	9	17	2	1	39.28	2006	2026
Pakistan	30	12	18	0	0	40.00	2007	2026
South Africa	18	5	12	1	0	27.77	2012	2024
West Indies	21	11	10	0	0	52.38	2009	2026
Zimbabwe	12	8	4	0	0	66.66	2008	2026
Associate Members
Canada	1	1	0	0	0	100.00	2008	2008
Hong Kong	1	1	0	0	0	100.00	2025	2025
Kenya	1	1	0	0	0	100.00	2007	2007
Namibia	2	1	1	0	0	50.00	2021	2022
Netherlands	4	4	0	0	0	100.00	2014	2024
Oman	1	1	0	0	0	100.00	2026	2026
United Arab Emirates	2	2	0	0	0	100.00	2016	2022
Total	235	103	124	6	2	45.06	2006	2026
Statistics are correct as of Sri Lanka v West Indies: at Sabina Park, Kingston, Jamaica; 14 June 2026.

=== First bilateral T20I series wins ===
Opponent	Year of first Home win	Year of first Away win
Afghanistan	2024	—N/a
Australia	2011	2010
Bangladesh	2013	2014
England	—N/a	2006
India	2021	—N/a
Ireland	—N/a	
New Zealand	2014	—N/a
Pakistan	—N/a	2019
South Africa	2018	2017
West Indies	2024	—N/a
Zimbabwe	2024	2025
Last Updated: 27 September 2025

=== First T20I match wins ===
Opponent	Home		Away / Neutral	
Opponent	Venue	Year	Venue	Year
Afghanistan	Rangiri Dambulla International Stadium, Dambulla, Sri Lanka	2024	Eden Gardens, Kolkata, India	2016
Australia	Pallekele International Cricket Stadium, Kandy, Sri Lanka	2011	Trent Bridge, Nottingham, England	2009
Bangladesh	Pallekele International Cricket Stadium, Kandy, Sri Lanka	2013	New Wanderers Stadium, Johannesburg, South Africa	2007
Canada	YTP		Maple Leaf North-West Ground, King City, Canada	2008
England	Pallekele International Cricket Stadium, Kandy, Sri Lanka	2012	Rose Bowl, Southampton, England	2006
Hong Kong	YTP		Dubai International Cricket Stadium, Dubai, UAE	2025
India	R. Premadasa Stadium, Colombo, Sri Lanka	2018	Vidarbha Cricket Association Stadium, Nagpur, India	2009
Ireland	R. Premadasa Stadium, Colombo, Sri Lanka	2026	Lord's, London, England	2009
Kenya	YTP		New Wanderers Stadium, Johannesburg, South Africa	2007
Namibia	YTP		Dubai International Cricket Stadium, Dubai, UAE	2021
Netherlands	YTP		Zahur Ahmed Chowdhury Stadium, Chittagong, Bangladesh	2014
New Zealand	Pallekele International Cricket Stadium, Kandy, Sri Lanka	2013	Westpac Stadium, Wellington, New Zealand	2006
Oman	Pallekele International Cricket Stadium, Kandy, Sri Lanka	2026	YTP	
Pakistan	Mahinda Rajapaksa International Stadium, Hambantota, Sri Lanka	2012	Maple Leaf North-West Ground, King City, Canada	2008
South Africa	Mahinda Rajapaksa International Stadium, Hambantota, Sri Lanka	2013	Zohur Ahmed Chowdhury Stadium, Chittagong, Bangladesh	2014
United Arab Emirates	YTP		Sher-e-Bangla National Cricket Stadium, Mirpur, Bangladesh	2016
West Indies	Pallekele International Cricket Stadium, Kandy, Sri Lanka	2012	Trent Bridge, Nottingham, England	2009
Zimbabwe	Mahinda Rajapaksa International Stadium, Hambantota, Sri Lanka	2012	Maple Leaf North-West Ground, King City, Canada	2008
Last Updated: 12 February 2026

=== Team scoring records ===
==== Most runs in an innings ====
The highest innings total scored in T20Is has been scored twice. The first occasion came in the match between Afghanistan and Ireland when Afghanistan scored 278/3 in the 2nd T20I of the Ireland series in India in February 2019. The Czech Republic national cricket team against Turkey during the 2019 Continental Cup scored 278/4 to equal the record. The highest score for Sri Lanka is 260/3 scored against Kenya during the 2007 World Twenty20.

Rank	Score	Opposition	Venue	Date
1	260/6	Kenya	New Wanderers Stadium, Johannesburg, South Africa	14 September 2007 ‡
2	225/5	Oman	Pallekele International Cricket Stadium, Pallekele, Sri Lanka	12 February 2026 ‡
3	218/5	New Zealand	Saxton Oval, Nelson, New Zealand	2 January 2025
4	215/5	India	Vidarbha Cricket Association Stadium, Nagpur, India	9 December 2009
4	215/3	West Indies	Pallekele International Cricket Stadium, Kandy, Sri Lanka	9 November 2015
Last Updated: 17 February 2026

==== Fewest runs in an innings ====
The lowest innings total scored was by Isle of Man against Spain when they were dismissed for 10 during the Isle of Man's 2023 tour of Spain. The lowest score in T20I history for Sri Lanka is 45 scored against India in the 2026 Asian Games.

Rank	Score	Opposition	Venue	Date
1	45/10	India	Kōrogi Athletic Park, Nisshin, Japan	1 October 2026
2	77/10	South Africa	Nassau International Cricket Stadium, New York, United States	3 June 2024 ‡
3	80/10	Zimbabwe	Harare Sports Club, Harare, Zimbabwe	6 September 2025
4	82/10	India	Dr. Y.S. Rajasekhara Reddy ACA-VDCA Cricket Stadium, Visakhapatnam, India	14 February 2016
5	87/10	Australia	Kensington Oval, Bridgetown, Barbados	9 May 2010 ‡
5	87/10	India	Barabati Stadium, Cuttack, India	20 December 2017
Last Updated: 2 October 2026

==== Most runs conceded an innings ====
The first match of the Australia's tour of Sri Lanka in 2016 saw Sri Lanka concede their highest innings total of 263/3.

Rank	Score	Opposition	Venue	Date
1	263/3	Australia	Pallekele International Cricket Stadium, Kandy, Sri Lanka	6 September 2016
2	260/5	India	Holkar Stadium, Indore, India	22 December 2017
3	233/2	Australia	Adelaide Oval, Adelaide, Australia	27 October 2019
4	228/5	India	Saurashtra Cricket Association Stadium, Rajkot, India	7 January 2023
5	215/5	Bangladesh	Ranasinghe Premadasa Stadium, Colombo, Sri Lanka	10 March 2018
Last Updated: 17 February 2026

==== Fewest runs conceded in an innings ====
The lowest score conceded by Sri Lanka for a full inning is 39 when they dismissed the Netherlands during the 2014 ICC World Twenty20 at Zohur Ahmed Chowdhury Stadium, Chittagong, Bangladesh.

Rank	Score	Opposition	Venue	Date
1	39/10	Netherlands	Zohur Ahmed Chowdhury Stadium, Chittagong, Bangladesh	24 March 2014 ‡
2	44/10	Netherlands	Sharjah Cricket Stadium, Sharjah, UAE	22 October 2021 ‡
3	60/10	New Zealand	Zohur Ahmed Chowdhury Stadium, Chittagong, Bangladesh	31 March 2014 ‡
4	81/10	New Zealand	Central Broward Regional Park, Lauderhill, USA	23 May 2010
4	81/8	India	Ranasinghe Premadasa Stadium, Colombo, Sri Lanka	29 July 2021
Last Updated: 17 February 2026

==== Most runs aggregate in a match ====
The highest match aggregate scored in T20Is came in the match between India and West Indies in the first T20I of the August 2016 series at Central Broward Regional Park, Lauderhill when India scored 244/4 in response to West Indies score of 245/6 to lose the match by 1 run. The first match of the Australia's tour of Sri Lanka in 2016 saw a total of 441 runs being scored, the most involving Sri Lanka.

Rank	Aggregate	Scores	Venue	Date
1	441/12	Australia (263/3) v Sri Lanka (178/9)	Pallekele International Cricket Stadium, Kandy, Sri Lanka	6 September 2016
2	432/14	India (260/5) v Sri Lanka (172)	Holkar Stadium, Indore, India	22 December 2017
3	429/11	Sri Lanka (214/6) v Bangladesh (215/5)	Ranasinghe Premadasa Stadium, Colombo, Sri Lanka	10 March 2018
4	429/12	Sri Lanka (218/5) v New Zealand (211/7)	Saxton Oval, Saxton, New Zealand	2 January 2025
5	419/14	Pakistan (212/8) v Sri Lanka (207/6)	Pallekele International Cricket Stadium, Kandy, Sri Lanka	28 February 2026 ‡
Last Updated: 28 February 2026

==== Fewest runs aggregate in a match ====
The lowest match aggregate in T20Is is 57 when Turkey were dismissed for 28 by Luxembourg in the second T20I of the 2019 Continental Cup in Romania in August 2019. The lowest match aggregate in T20I history for Sri Lanka is 79 scored during the 2014 ICC World Twenty20 against Netherlands.

Rank	Aggregate	Scores	Venue	Date
1	79/11	Netherlands (39) v Sri Lanka (40/1)	Zohur Ahmed Chowdhury Stadium, Chittagong, Bangladesh	24 March 2014 ‡
2	89/12	Netherlands (44) v Sri Lanka (45/2)	Sharjah Cricket Stadium, UAE	22 October 2021 ‡
3	124/9	South Africa (78/4) v Sri Lanka (46/5)	Mahinda Rajapaksa International Stadium, Hambantota, Sri Lanka	22 September 2012 ‡
4	157/14	Sri Lanka (77) v South Africa (80/4)	Nassau County International Cricket Stadium, New York, USA	3 June 2025 ‡
5	163/13	New Zealand (81) v Sri Lanka (82/3)	Central Broward Regional Park, Lauderhill, USA	23 May 2010
5	163/11	India (81/8) v Sri Lanka (82/3)	Ranasinghe Premadasa Stadium, Colombo, Sri Lanka	29 July 2021
Last Updated: 17 February 2026

=== Result records ===
A T20I match is won when one side has scored more runs than the runs scored by the opposing side during their innings. If both sides have completed both their allocated innings and the side that fielded last has the higher aggregate of runs, it is known as a win by runs. This indicates the number of runs that they had scored more than the opposing side. If the side batting last wins the match, it is known as a win by wickets, indicating the number of wickets that were still to fall.

==== Greatest win margins (by runs) ====
The greatest winning margin by runs in T20Is was Czech Republic's victory over Turkey by 257 runs in the sixth match of the 2019 Continental Cup. The largest victory recorded by Sri Lanka was during the 2007 ICC World Twenty20 by 172 runs against Kenya.

Rank	Margin	Opposition	Venue	Date
1	172 Runs	Kenya	New Wanderers Stadium, Johannesburg, South Africa	14 September 2007 ‡
2	105 Runs	Oman	Pallekele International Cricket Stadium, Pallekele, Sri Lanka	12 February 2026 ‡
3	83 Runs	Netherlands	Daren Sammy Cricket Ground, Gros Islet, Saint Lucia	16 June 2024 ‡
4	82 Runs	Zimbabwe	Mahinda Rajapaksa International Stadium, Hambantota, Sri Lanka	18 September 2012 ‡
5	79 Runs	United Arab Emirates	Kardinia Park, Geelong, Australia	18 October 2022 ‡
Last Updated: 28 February 2026

==== Greatest win margins (by balls remaining) ====
The greatest winning margin by balls remaining in T20Is was Austria's victory over Turkey by 104 balls remaining in the ninth match of the 2019 Continental Cup. The largest victory recorded by Sri Lanka is during the 2014 ICC World Twenty20 against the Netherlands when they won by 9 wickets with 90 balls remaining.

Rank	Balls remaining	Margin	Opposition	Venue	Date
1	90	9 wickets	Netherlands	Zohur Ahmed Chowdhury Stadium, Chittagong, Bangladesh	24 March 2014 ‡
2	77	8 wickets	Netherlands	Sharjah Cricket Stadium, Sharjah, UAE	22 October 2021 ‡
3	55		Zimbabwe	Ranasinghe Premadasa Stadium, Colombo, Sri Lanka	18 January 2024
4	39	7 wickets	Namibia	Sheikh Zayed Cricket Stadium, Abu Dhabi, UAE	18 October 2021 ‡
5	33	7 wickets	India	Ranasinghe Premadasa Stadium, Colombo, Sri Lanka	29 July 2021
Last Updated: 18 October 2024

==== Greatest win margins (by wickets) ====
A total of 22 matches have ended with chasing team winning by 10 wickets with New Zealand winning by such margins a record three times. Sri Lanka have won by 9 wickets on four occasions.

Rank	Margin	Opposition	Venue	Date
1	9 wickets	England	Bristol County Ground, Bristol, England	25 June 2011
1	9 wickets	West Indies	Pallekele International Cricket Stadium, Kandy, Sri Lanka	29 September 2012 ‡
1	9 wickets	Netherlands	Zohur Ahmed Chowdhury Stadium, Chittagong, Bangladesh	24 March 2014 ‡
1	9 wickets	Ireland	Bellerive Oval, Hobart, Australia	23 October 2022 ‡
1	9 wickets	Zimbabwe	R. Premadasa Stadium, Colombo, Sri Lanka	19 January 2024
1	9 wickets	West Indies	Rangiri Dambulla International Stadium, Dambulla, Sri Lanka	18 October 2024
Last updated: 18 October 2024

==== Highest successful run chases ====
Australia holds the record for the highest successful run chase which they achieved when they scored 245/5 in response to New Zealand's 243/6. The highest successful chase for Sri Lanka is 194/4 against Bangladesh during the Sri Lanka's tour of Bangladesh in 2018.

Rank	Score	Target	Opposition	Venue	Date
1	194/4	194	Bangladesh	Sher-e-Bangla National Cricket Stadium, Mirpur, Bangladesh	15 February 2018
2	193/2	192	Zimbabwe	Harare Sports Club, Harare, Zimbabwe	7 September 2025
3	184/8	184	Bangladesh	Sharjah Cricket Stadium, Dubai, UAE	3 September 2022
3	184/2	182	Australia	Pallekele International Cricket Stadium, Kandy, Sri Lanka	16 February 2026 ‡
4	179/6	176	Afghanistan	Sharjah Cricket Stadium, Dubai, UAE	2 September 2022
Last Updated: 28 February 2026

==== Narrowest win margins (by runs) ====
The narrowest run margin victory is by 1 run which has been achieved in 15 T20Is. The narrowest win margin for Sri Lanka is 2 runs achieved three times.

Rank	Margin	Opposition	Venue	Date
1	2 Runs	England	Rose Bowl, Southampton, England	15 June 2006
1	2 Runs	Bangladesh	Zohur Ahmed Chowdhury Stadium, Chittagong, Bangladesh	12 February 2014
1	2 Runs	Australia	Melbourne Cricket Ground, Melbourne, Australia	28 January 2013
4	3 Runs	Bangladesh	Sylhet International Cricket Stadium, Sylhet, Bangladesh	4 March 2024
5	4 Runs	Afghanistan	Rangiri Dambulla International Stadium, Dambulla, Sri Lanka	17 February 2024
Last Updated: 17 February 2026

==== Narrowest win margins (by balls remaining) ====
The narrowest winning margin by balls remaining in T20Is is by winning of the last ball which has been achieved 26 times. Sri Lanka has achieve victory of the last ball on four occasions.

Rank	Balls remaining	Margin	Opposition	Venue	Date
1	0	5 wickets	India	Darren Sammy National Cricket Stadium, Gros Islet, Saint Lucia	11 May 2010 ‡
1	0	3 wickets	Bangladesh	Zohur Ahmed Chowdhury Stadium, Chittagong, Bangladesh	14 February 2014
1	0	5 wickets	Australia	Melbourne Cricket Ground, Melbourne, Australia	17 February 2017
1	0	2 wickets	Australia	Kardinia Park, Geelong, Australia	19 February 2017
1	0	3 wickets	Zimbabwe	R. Premadasa Stadium, Colombo, Sri Lanka	14 January 2024
Last Updated: 17 February 2026

==== Narrowest win margins (by wickets) ====
The narrowest margin of victory by wickets is 1 wicket which has settled four such T20Is. The narrowest victory by wickets for Sri Lanka is two wickets.

Rank	Margin	Opposition	Venue	Date
1	2 wickets	Australia	Kardinia Park, Geelong, Australia	19 February 2017
1	2 wickets	Bangladesh	Dubai International Cricket Stadium, Dubai, UAE	3 September 2022 ‡
3	3 wickets	Bangladesh	Zohur Ahmed Chowdhury Stadium, Chittagong, Bangladesh	14 February 2014
3	3 wickets	South Africa	New Wanderers Stadium, Johannesburg, South Africa	22 January 2017
3	3 wickets	South Africa	R. Premadasa Stadium, Colombo, Sri Lanka	14 August 2018
3	3 wickets	Zimbabwe	R. Premadasa Stadium, Colombo, Sri Lanka	14 January 2024
Last Updated: 17 February 2026

==== Greatest loss margins (by runs) ====
Sri Lanka's biggest defeat by runs was against Australia in the Sri Lanka's tour of Australia in 2019 at Adelaide Oval, Adelaide, Australia.

Rank	Margin	Opposition	Venue	Date
1	134 runs	Australia	Adelaide Oval, Adelaide, Australia	27 October 2019
2	93 runs	India	Barabati Stadium, Cuttack, India	20 December 2017
3	91 runs	India	Niranjan Shah Stadium, Rajkot, India	7 January 2023
4	89 runs	England	Rose Bowl, Southampton, England	26 June 2021
5	88 runs	India	Holkar Stadium, Indore, India	22 December 2017
Last Updated: 17 February 2026

==== Greatest loss margins (by balls remaining) ====
The largest defeat suffered by Sri Lanka was against New Zealand in New Zealand during the 2016 T20I Series when they lost by 9 wickets with 60 balls remaining.

Rank	Balls remaining	Margin	Opposition	Venue	Date
1	60	9 wickets	New Zealand	Eden Park, Auckland, New Zealand	10 January 2016
2	59	8 wickets	Afghanistan	Dubai International Cricket Stadium, Dubai, UAE	27 August 2022
3	58	10 wickets	Australia	Sahara Park Newlands, Cape Town, South Africa	20 September 2007 ‡
4	42	9 wickets	Australia	The Gabba, Brisbane, Australia	30 October 2019
5	41	4 wickets	West Indies	Coolidge Cricket Ground, Saint George, Antigua	3 March 2021
Last Updated:17 February 2026

==== Greatest loss margins (by wickets) ====
Sri Lanka have lost a T20I match by a margin of 10 wickets on one occasion.

Rank	Margins	Opposition	Most recent venue	Date
1	10 wickets	Australia	Sahara Park Newlands, Cape Town, South Africa	20 September 2007 ‡
1	10 wickets	South Africa	R. Premadasa Stadium, Colombo, Sri Lanka	14 September 2021
1	10 wickets	Australia	R. Premadasa Stadium, Colombo, Sri Lanka	7 June 2022
3	9 wickets	New Zealand	Eden Park, Auckland, New Zealand	10 January 2016
3	9 wickets	India	Dr. Y.S. Rajasekhara Reddy ACA-VDCA Cricket Stadium, Visakhapatnam, India	14 February 2016
3	9 wickets	Australia	The Gabba, Brisbane, Australia	30 October 2019
3	9 wickets	South Africa	R. Premadasa Stadium, Colombo, Sri Lanka	12 September 2021
3	9 wickets	New Zealand	University Oval, Dunedin, New Zealand	5 April 2023
Last Updated: 17 February 2026

==== Narrowest loss margins (by runs) ====
The narrowest loss of Sri Lanka in terms of runs is by 3 runs suffered twice.

Rank	Margin	Opposition	Venue	Date
1	2 runs	India	Wankhede Stadium, Mumbai, India	3 January 2023
4	3 runs	New Zealand	Ranasinghe Premadasa Stadium, Colombo, Sri Lanka	2 September 2009
4	3 runs	New Zealand	Bay Oval, Tauranga, New Zealand	7 January 2016
4	3 runs	Afghanistan	Rangiri Dambulla International Stadium, Dambulla, Sri Lanka	21 February 2024
6	5 runs	New Zealand	Rangiri Dambulla International Stadium, Dambulla, Sri Lanka	10 November 2024
6	5 runs	Pakistan	Pallekele International Cricket Stadium, Kandy, Sri Lanka	28 February 2026
Last Updated: 28 February 2026

==== Narrowest loss margins (by balls remaining) ====
Sri Lanka has suffered loss with one ball remaining four times.

Rank	Balls remaining	Margin	Opposition	Venue	Date
1	1	3 wickets	Pakistan	Maple Leaf North-West Ground, King City, Canada	11 October 2008
1	1	2 wickets	New Zealand	Providence Stadium, Providence, Guyana	30 April 2010 ‡
1	1	2 wickets	Pakistan	Sheikh Zayed Cricket Stadium, Abu Dhabi, UAE	27 October 2017
1	1	2 wickets	Bangladesh	Ranasinghe Premadasa Stadium, Colombo, Sri Lanka	16 March 2018
1	1	4 wickets	South Africa	Sharjah Cricket Stadium, Sharjah, UAE	30 October 2021 ‡
1	1	4 wickets	New Zealand	John Davies Oval, Queenstown, New Zealand	8 April 2023
Last Updated: 17 February 2026

==== Narrowest loss margins (by wickets) ====
Sri Lanka has suffered defeat by 1 wicket once.

Rank	Margin	Opposition	Venue	Date
1	1 wicket	Pakistan	Ranasinghe Premadasa Stadium, Colombo, Sri Lanka	1 August 2015
2	2 wickets	New Zealand	Providence Stadium, Providence, Guyana	30 April 2010 ‡
2	2 wickets	Pakistan	Sheikh Zayed Cricket Stadium, Abu Dhabi, UAE	27 October 2017
2	2 wickets	Bangladesh	Ranasinghe Premadasa Stadium, Colombo, Sri Lanka	16 March 2018
5	3 wickets	Pakistan	Maple Leaf North-West Ground, King City, Canada	11 October 2008
5	3 wickets	India	Ranasinghe Premadasa Stadium, Colombo, Sri Lanka	10 February 2009
5	3 wickets	Pakistan	Dubai International Cricket Stadium, Dubai, UAE	11 December 2013
5	3 wickets	West Indies	Coolidge Cricket Ground, Saint George, Antigua	7 March 2021
5	3 wickets	Australia	Ranasinghe Premadasa Stadium, Colombo, Sri Lanka	8 June 2022
Last Updated: 17 February 2026

==== Tied matches ====
A tie can occur when the scores of both teams are equal at the conclusion of play, provided that the side batting last has completed their innings. There have been several ties in T20Is history with Sri Lanka involved in six such games.

Opposition	Venue	Date
New Zealand	Pallekele International Cricket Stadium, Kandy, Sri Lanka	27 September 2012 ‡
South Africa	Sahara Park Newlands, Cape Town, South Africa	19 March 2019
Australia	Sydney Cricket Ground, Sydney, Australia	13 February 2022
New Zealand	Eden Park, Auckland, New Zealand	2 April 2023
India	Pallekele International Cricket Stadium, Kandy, Sri Lanka	30 July 2024
India	Dubai International Cricket Stadium, Dubai, UAE	6 September 2025
Last updated: 17 February 2026

== Batting records ==
=== Most career runs ===
A run is the basic means of scoring in cricket. A run is scored when the batsman hits the ball with his bat and with his partner runs the length of 22 yards (20 m) of the pitch. India's Babar Azam has scored the most runs in T20Is with 4,596. Second is Jos Buttler of England with 4,384 ahead of Rohit Sharma from India in third with 4,231. Kusal Mendis is the leading Sri Lankan batsmen on this list.

Rank	Runs	Player	Matches	Innings	Average	100	50	Period
1	2,791	Kusal Mendis†	112	112	26.58	0	21	2016–2026
2	2,784	Pathum Nissanka†	97	96	30.59	2	19	2021–2026
3	2,335	Kusal Perera†	95	93	26.23	1	16	2013–2026
4	2,075	Dasun Shanaka †	140	126	20.54	0	9	2015–2026
5	1,889	Tillakaratne Dilshan	80	79	28.19	1	13	2006–2016
Last Updated: 14 October 2026

=== Fastest runs getter ===
Runs	Batsman	Match	Innings	Record Date	Reference
1,000	Kusal Perera†	34	34	26 January 2013	
2,000	Pathum Nissanka†	69	68	13 September 2025	
Last Updated: 17 February 2026

=== Most runs in each batting position ===
Batting position	Batsman	Innings	Runs	Average	Career Span	Ref
Opener	Pathum Nissanka †	95	2,745	30.50	2021–2026	
Number 3	Kusal Perera†	39	1,156	31.24	2013–2025	
Number 4	Kumar Sangakkara	25	675	35.52	2006–2014	
Number 5	Angelo Mathews	30	757	34.40	2010–2024	
Number 6	Dasun Shanaka†	64	1,085	20.09	2016–2026	
Number 7	Wanindu Hasaranga†	46	443	11.97	2019–2026	
Number 8	Chamika Karunaratne†	25	222	15.85	2021–2025	
Number 9	Nuwan Kulasekara	12	92	15.33	2008–2017	
Number 10	Lasith Malinga	20	58	4.46	2007–2020	
Number 11	Vikum Sanjaya	5	20	6.66	2017–2017	
Last Updated: 13 September 2026

=== Highest individual score ===
The third T20I of the 2018 Zimbabwe Tri-Nation Series saw Aaron Finch score the highest Individual score. Nissanka holds the highest such score for a Sri Lankan batsmen.

Rank	Runs	Player	Opposition	Venue	Date
1	107	Pathum Nissanka	India	Dubai International Cricket Stadium, Dubai, UAE	26 September 2025
2	104*	Tillakaratne Dilshan	Australia	Pallekele International Cricket Stadium, Kandy, Sri Lanka	6 August 2011
3	101	Kusal Perera	New Zealand	Saxton Oval, Nelson, New Zealand	2 January 2025
4	100*	Pathum Nissanka	Australia	Pallekele International Cricket Stadium, Kandy, Sri Lanka	16 February 2026 ‡
4	100	Mahela Jayawardene	Zimbabwe	Providence Stadium, Providence, Guyana	3 May 2010 ‡
5	98*	Mahela Jayawardene	West Indies	Kensington Oval, Bridgetown, Barbados	7 May 2010 ‡
5	98*	Pathum Nissanka	Zimbabwe	Rawalpindi Cricket Stadium, Rawalpindi, Pakistan	25 November 2025
Last Updated: 17 February 2026

=== Highest individual score in each batting position ===
Batting position	Batsman	Score	Opposition	Ground	Date	Ref
Opener	Pathum Nissanka	107	India	Dubai International Cricket Stadium, Dubai, UAE	26 September 2025	
Number 3	Kusal Perera	101	New Zealand	Saxton Oval, Nelson Bangladesh	2 January 2025	
Number 4	Mahela Jayawardene	78	Ireland	Lord's, London, England	14 June 2009 †	
Number 5	Asela Gunaratne	84*	Australia	Kardinia Park, Geelong, Australia	19 February 2017	
Number 6	Dasun Shanaka	74*	India	Himachal Pradesh Cricket Association Stadium, Dharamshala, India	27 February 2022	
Number 7	Dasun Shanaka	76*	Pakistan	Pallekele International Cricket Stadium, Kandy, Sri Lanka	28 February 2026	
Number 8	Isuru Udana	84*	South Africa	Centurion Park, Centurion, South Africa	22 March 2019	
Number 9	Lasith Malinga	27	New Zealand	Eden Park, Auckland, New Zealand	26 December 2006	
Number 10	Dilhara Fernando	21	New Zealand	Eden Park, Auckland, New Zealand	26 December 2006	
Number 11	Maheesh Theekshana	11*	Namibia	Kardinia Park, Geelong, Australia	16 October 2022	
Last Updated: 28 February 2026

=== Highest individual score – progression of record ===
Runs	Player	Opponent	Venue	Season
41	Sanath Jayasuriya	England	Rose Bowl, Southampton, England	15 June 2006
51*	Sanath Jayasuriya	New Zealand	Westpac Stadium, Wellington, New Zealand	22 December 2006
88	Sanath Jayasuriya	Kenya	New Wanderers Stadium, Johannesburg, South Africa	14 September 2007 ‡
96*	Tillakaratne Dilshan	West Indies	The Oval, London, England	19 June 2009 ‡
100	Mahela Jayawardene	Zimbabwe	Providence Stadium, Providence, Guyana	3 May 2010 ‡
104*	Tillakaratne Dilshan	Australia	Pallekele International Cricket Stadium, Kandy, Sri Lanka	6 August 2011
107	Pathum Nissanka	India	Dubai International Cricket Stadium, Dubai, UAE	26 September 2025
Last Updated: 17 February 2026

=== Highest career average ===
A batsman's batting average is the total number of runs they have scored divided by the number of times they have been dismissed.

Rank	Average	Player	Innings	Not out	Runs	Period
1	31.76	Mahela Jayawardene	55	8	1,493	2006–2014
2	31.40	Kumar Sangakkara	53	9	1,382	2006–2014
3	30.59	Pathum Nissanka†	96	5	2,784	2021–2026
4	28.19	Tillakaratne Dilshan	79	12	1,889	2006–2016
5	27.76	Angelo Mathews	73	22	1,416	2009–2024
Qualification: 15 innings. Last Updated: 13 October 2026

=== Highest Average at each batting position ===
Batting position	Batsman	Innings	Runs	Average	Career Span	Ref
Opener	Mahela Jayawardene	23	812	40.60	2010–2013	
Number 3	Kusal Perera†	38	1,152	32.00	2013–2025	
Number 4	Kumar Sangakkara	25	675	35.52	2006–2014	
Number 5	Angelo Mathews	30	757	34.40	2010–2024	
Number 6	Angelo Mathews	19	331	27.58	2009–2024	
Number 7	Thisara Perera	26	420	24.70	2010–2021	
Number 8	Isuru Udana	10	155	31.00	2009–2021	
Number 9	Nuwan Kulasekara	12	92	15.33	2008–2017	
Number 10	Dushmantha Chameera†	10	26	5.20	2016–2024	
Number 11	Nuwan Pradeep	5	10	10.00	2016-2019	
Last Updated: 17 February 2026

=== Most half-centuries ===
A half-century is a score of between 50 and 99 runs. Statistically, once a batsman's score reaches 100, it is no longer considered a half-century but a century.

Virat Kohli of India has scored the most half-centuries in T20Is with 38. He is followed by Pakistan's Babar Azam on 36 & India's Rohit Sharma with 32, Pakistan's Mohammad Rizwan on 29. Kusal Mendis has the most half-centuries among Sri Lankan batsmen.

Rank	Half centuries	Player	Innings	Runs	Period
1	21	Kusal Mendis†	112	2,791	2016–2026
2	19	Pathum Nissanka†	96	2,784	2021–2026
3	16	Kusal Perera†	93	2,335	2013–2026
4	13	Tillakaratne Dilshan	79	1,889	2006–2016
5	9	Mahela Jayawardene	55	1,493	2006–2014
5	9	Dasun Shanaka†	126	2,075	2015–2026
Last Updated: 14 October 2026

=== Fastest half-century ===
Dasun Shanaka, the aggressive lower order batter, scored the top 3 fastest T20I half–centuries for Sri Lanka: 19-ball fifties against Oman and West Indies, and a 20-ball fifty against India.

Rank	balls	Player	Opposition	Venue	Date
1	19	Dasun Shanaka	West Indies	Sabina Park, Kingston, Jamaica	14 June 2026
1	19	Dasun Shanaka	Oman	Pallekele International Cricket Stadium, Kandy, Sri Lanka	12 February 2026 ‡
3	20	Dasun Shanaka	India	Maharashtra Cricket Association Stadium, Pune, India	5 January 2023
4	21	Kumar Sangakkara	India	Vidarbha Cricket Association Ground, Nagpur, India	9 December 2009
4	21	Mahela Jayawardene	Kenya	Wanderers Stadium, Johannesburg, South Africa	14 September 2007 ‡
Last Updated: 15 June 2026

=== Most centuries ===
A century is a score of 100 or more runs in a single innings.

Rohit Sharma & Glen Maxwell has scored the most centuries in T20Is with 5. Nissanka with 2 centuries, hold the Sri Lankan record.

Rank	Centuries	Player	Innings	Runs	Period
1	2	Pathum Nissanka †	96	2,784	2021–2026
2	1	Mahela Jayawardene	55	1,493	2006–2014
2	1	Kusal Perera †	93	2,335	2013–2026
2	1	Tillakaratne Dilshan	79	1,889	2006–2016
Last Updated: 13 October 2026

=== Most Sixes ===
Rank	Sixes	Player	Innings	Runs	Period
1	118	Dasun Shanaka†	126	2,075	2015–2026
2	106	Kusal Mendis†	112	2,791	2016–2026
3	83	Pathum Nissanka†	96	2,784	2021–2026
4	72	Kusal Perera†	93	2,335	2013–2026
5	69	Charith Asalanka†	77	1,513	2021–2026
Last Updated: 14 October 2026

=== Most Fours ===
Rank	Fours	Player	Innings	Runs	Period
1	282	Pathum Nissanka †	96	2,784	2021–2026
2	250	Kusal Mendis †	112	2,791	2016–2026
3	227	Kusal Perera †	93	2,335	2012–2026
4	223	Tillakaratne Dilshan	79	1,889	2006–2016
5	173	Mahela Jayawardene	55	1,493	2006–2014
Last Updated: 14 October 2026

=== Highest strike rates ===
Suryakumar Yadav of India holds the record for highest strike rate, with minimum 250 balls faced qualification, with 179.56. Thisara Perera is the Sri Lankan with the highest strike rate.

Rank	Strike rate	Player	Runs	Balls Faced	Period
1	146.63	Thisara Perera	1,047	714	2010–2021
2	133.18	Mahela Jayawardene	1,493	1,121	2006–2014
3	132.7	Kusal Perera †	2,313	1,743	2013–2026
4	132.78	Bhanuka Rajapaksha †	733	552	2019–2025
5	131.27	Kamindu Mendis †	617	470	2018–2026
Qualification= 250 balls faced. Last Updated: 17 February 2026

=== Highest strike rates in an inning ===
Dwayne Smith of West Indies strike rate of 414.28 during his 29 off 7 balls against Bangladesh during 2007 ICC World Twenty20 is the world record for highest strike rate in an innings. Dasun Shanaka with his innings of 34 off 9 balls against Pakistan in the same tournament holds the top position for a Sri Lanka player in this list.

Rank	Strike rate	Player	Runs	Balls Faced	Opposition	Venue	Date
1	377.77	Dasun Shanaka	34	9	Pakistan	Rangiri Dambulla International Stadium, Dambulla, Sri Lanka	11 January 2026
2	353.85	Jehan Mubarak	46*	13	Kenya	New Wanderers Stadium, Johannesburg, South Africa	14 September 2007 ‡
3	284.62	Angelo Mathews	37*	13	West Indies	Pallekele International Cricket Stadium, Kandy, Sri Lanka	9 November 2015
4	277.77	Kusal Mendis	25	9	New Zealand	Eden Park, Auckland, New Zealand	2 April 2023
5	272.72	Dasun Shanaka	30*	11	Bangladesh	Sylhet International Cricket Stadium, Sylhet, Bangladesh	18 February 2018
Last Updated: 28 February 2026

=== Most runs in a calendar year ===
Mohammad Rizwan of Pakistan holds the record for most runs scored in a calendar year with 1,326 runs scored in 2021. Pathum Nissanka scored 713 runs in 2022, the most for a Sri Lanka batsmen in a year.

Rank	Runs	Player	Matches	Innings	Year
1	713	Pathum Nissanka	24	24	2022
2	628	Kusal Mendis	22	22	2024
3	625	Pathum Nissanka	18	18	2025
4	622	Pathum Nissanka	19	19	2024
5	521	Kusal Mendis	20	20	2022
Last Updated: 17 February 2026

=== Most runs in a series ===
The 2014 ICC World Twenty20 in Bangladesh saw Virat Kohli set the record for the most runs scored in a single series scoring 319 runs. He is followed by Tillakaratne Dilshan with 317 runs scored in the 2009 ICC World Twenty20.

Rank	Runs	Player	Matches	Innings	Series
1	317	Tillakaratne Dilshan	7	7	2009 ICC World Twenty20
2	302	Mahela Jayawardene	6	6	2010 ICC World Twenty20
3	261	Pathum Nissanka	6	6	2025 Asia Cup
4	243	Mahela Jayawardene	7	7	2012 ICC World Twenty20
5	231	Charith Asalanka †	6	6	2021 ICC Men's T20 World Cup
Last Updated: 17 February 2026

=== Most ducks ===
A duck refers to a batsman being dismissed without scoring a run. Dasun Shanaka of Sri Lanka, holds the world record for the most T20I ducks in career.

Rank	Ducks	Player	Matches	Innings	Period
1	16	Dasun Shanaka†	127	114	2015–2026
2	10	Tillakaratne Dilshan	80	79	2006–2016
3	8	Lasith Malinga	84	33	2006–2020
3	8	Wanindu Hasaranga†	78	66	2019–2026
3	8	Thisara Perera	80	70	2010–2021
3	8	Maheesh Theekshana†	79	35	2021–2026
Last Updated: 17 February 2026

== Bowling records ==
=== Most career wickets ===
A bowler takes the wicket of a batsman when the form of dismissal is bowled, caught, leg before wicket, stumped or hit wicket. If the batsman is dismissed by run out, obstructing the field, handling the ball, hitting the ball twice or timed out the bowler does not receive credit.

Rashid Khan of Afghanistan, is the highest wicket-taker in T20Is. Wanindu Hasaranga, former of Sri Lanka, is the highest wicket-taker in T20Is for Sri Lanka.

Rank	Wickets	Player	Matches	Innings	Average	SR	Period
1	163	Wanindu Hasaranga†	101	99	16.23	13.70	2019–2026
2	107	Lasith Malinga	84	83	20.79	16.80	2006–2020
3	100	Dushmantha Chameera†	83	83	24.77	18.00	2015–2026
4	86	Maheesh Theekshana†	88	88	27.38	23.00	2021–2026
5	66	Nuwan Kulasekara	58	58	23.18	18.60	2008–2017
5	66	Ajantha Mendis	39	39	14.42	13.40	2008–2014
7	46	Dasun Shanaka†	138	79	26.63	19.10	2015–2026
8	45	Angelo Mathews	90	72	30.86	25.90	2009–2024
8	45	Thisara Perera	80	63	35.08	22.70	2010–2021
10	40	Matheesha Pathirana†	28	27	18.3	13.00	2022–2026
Last Updated: 9 October 2026

=== Fastest to multiples of 50 wickets ===
Runs	Batsman	Match	Record Date	Reference
50	Ajantha Mendis	26	04 October 2012	
100	Wanindu Hasaranga†	63	19 February 2024	
Last updated: 18 October 2024

=== Best figures in an innings ===
Bowling figures refers to the number of the wickets a bowler has taken and the number of runs conceded. India's Deepak Chahar holds the world record for best figures in an innings when he took 6/7 against Bangladesh in November 2019 at Nagpur. Ajantha Mendis holds the Sri Lankan record for best bowling figures.

Rank	Figures	Player	Opposition	Venue	Date
1	6/8	Ajantha Mendis	Zimbabwe	Mahinda Rajapaksa International Stadium, Hambantota, Sri Lanka	18 September 2012 ‡
2	6/16	Ajantha Mendis	Australia	Pallekele International Cricket Stadium, Kandy, Sri Lanka	8 August 2011
3	5/3	Rangana Herath	New Zealand	Zohur Ahmed Chowdhury Stadium, Chittagong, Bangladesh	31 March 2014 ‡
4	5/6	Lasith Malinga	New Zealand	Pallekele International Cricket Stadium, Kandy, Sri Lanka	6 September 2019
5	5/20	Nuwan Thushara	Bangladesh	Sylhet International Cricket Stadium, Sylhet, Bangladesh	9 March 2024
Last Updated: 18 October 2024

=== Best figures in an innings – progression of record ===
Figures	Player	Opposition	Venue	Date
2/32	Sanath Jayasuriya	England	Rose Bowl, Southampton, England	15 June 2006
3/21	Sanath Jayasuriya	New Zealand	Westpac Stadium, Wellington, New Zealand	22 December 2006
3/19	Dilhara Fernando	New Zealand	Eden Park, Auckland, New Zealand	26 December 2006
4/15	Ajantha Mendis	Zimbabwe	Maple Leaf North-West Ground, King City, Canada	10 October 2008
6/16	Ajantha Mendis	Australia	Pallekele International Cricket Stadium, Kandy, Sri Lanka	8 August 2011
6/8	Ajantha Mendis	Zimbabwe	Mahinda Rajapaksa International Stadium, Hambantota, Sri Lanka	18 September 2012 ‡
Last Updated: 18 October 2020

=== Best career average ===
A bowler's bowling average is the total number of runs they have conceded divided by the number of wickets they have taken. Nepalan's Sandeep Lamichhane holds the record for the best career average in T20Is with 12.56. Ajantha Mendis, Sri Lankan cricketer, is second behind Sandeep with an overall career average of 14.42 runs per wicket.

Rank	Average	Player	Wickets	Runs	Balls	Period
1	14.42	Ajantha Mendis	66	952	885	2008-2014
2	15.36	Wanindu Hasaranga †	133	2,044	1,758	2019-2025
3	20.79	Lasith Malinga	107	2,225	1,799	2006-2020
4	21.78	Dasun Shanaka †	33	719	522	2015-2024
5	22.87	Lahiru Kumara †	33	755	544	2019-2023
Qualification: 500 balls. Last Updated: 13 September 2025

=== Best career economy rate ===
A bowler's economy rate is the total number of runs they have conceded divided by the number of overs they have bowled. New Zealand's Daniel Vettori, holds the T20I record for the best career economy rate with 5.70. Mendis, with a rate of 6.45 runs per over conceded over his 39-match T20I career, is the highest Sri Lankan on the list.

Rank	Economy rate	Player	Wickets	Runs	Balls	Period
1	6.45	Ajantha Mendis	66	952	885	2008–2014
2	6.92	Maheesh Theekshana †	60	1,578	1,368	2021–2025
3	6.98	Wanindu Hasaranga †	131	2,019	1,734	2019–2025
4	7.12	Angelo Mathews †	45	1,389	1,169	2009–2024
5	7.42	Lasith Malinga	107	2,225	1,799	2006–2020
Qualification: 500 balls. Last Updated: 10 July 2025

=== Best career strike rate ===
A bowler's strike rate is the total number of balls they have bowled divided by the number of wickets they have taken. The top bowler with the best T20I career strike rate is Rashid Khan of Afghanistan with strike rate of 12.3 balls per wicket. Ajantha Mendis is the Sri Lankan bowler with the lowest strike rate.

Rank	Strike rate	Player	Wickets	Runs	Balls	Period
1	13.23	Wanindu Hasaranga †	131	2,019	1,734	2019–2025
2	13.40	Ajantha Mendis	66	952	885	2008–2014
3	16.05	Dasun Shanaka †	34	741	546	2015–2025
4	16.48	Lahiru Kumara †	33	755	544	2019–2023
5	16.81	Lasith Malinga	107	2,225	1,799	2006–2020
Qualification: 500 balls. Last Updated: 10 July 2025

=== Most four-wickets (& over) hauls in an innings ===
Afghanistan's Rashid Khan has taken the most four-wickets (or over) among all the bowlers. Mendis has taken the most such hauls among Sri Lankan bowlers.

Rank	Four-wicket hauls	Player	Matches	Balls	Wickets	Period
1	5	Ajantha Mendis	39	885	66	2008–2014
1	5	Wanindu Hasaranga †	92	2,040	151	2019–2026
3	3	Nuwan Thushara †	30	599	36	2022–2026
3	3	Lasith Malinga	84	1,799	107	2006–2020
3	3	Dushmantha Chameera †	74	1,608	88	2015–2026
5	2	Matheesha Pathirana †	22	410	33	2022–2026
5	2	Nuwan Kulasekara	58	1,231	66	2008–2017
Last Updated: 16 February 2026

=== Best economy rates in an inning ===
The best economy rate in an inning, when a minimum of 12 balls are delivered by the bowler, is Sri Lankan player Nuwan Kulasekara economy of 0.00 during his spell of 0 runs for 1 wicket in 2 overs against Netherlands at Zohur Ahmed Chowdhury Stadium in the 2014 ICC World Twenty20.

Rank	Economy	Player	Overs	Runs	Wickets	Opposition	Venue	Date
1	0.00	Nuwan Kulasekara	2	0	1	Netherlands	Zohur Ahmed Chowdhury Stadium, Chittagong, Bangladesh	24 March 2014 ‡
2	0.86	Rangana Herath	3.3	3	5	New Zealand	Zohur Ahmed Chowdhury Stadium, Chittagong, Bangladesh	31 March 2014 ‡
3	1.00	Sachithra Senanayake	3	3	2	New Zealand	Zohur Ahmed Chowdhury Stadium, Chittagong, Bangladesh	31 March 2014 ‡
4	1.33	Nuwan Kulasekara	3	4	3	New Zealand	Central Broward Regional Park, Lauderhill, USA	23 May 2010
4	1.33	Angelo Mathews †	3	4	0	New Zealand	Pallekele International Cricket Stadium, Kandy, Sri Lanka	30 October 2012 ‡
Qualification: 12 balls bowled. Last Updated: 18 October 2024

=== Best strike rates in an inning ===
The best strike rate in an inning, when a minimum of 4 wickets are taken by the player, is by Steve Tikolo of Kenya during his spell of 4/2 in 1.2 overs against Scotland during the 2013 ICC World Twenty20 Qualifier at ICC Academy, Dubai, UAE. Ajantha Mendis during both six-wicket spells in an inning also recorded the best strike rate for a Sri Lankan bowler.

Rank	Strike rate	Player	Wickets	Runs	Balls	Opposition	Venue	Date
1	4.00	Ajantha Mendis	6	16	24	Australia	Pallekele International Cricket Stadium, Kandy, Sri Lanka	8 August 2011
1	4.00	Ajantha Mendis	6	8	24	Zimbabwe	Mahinda Rajapaksa International Stadium, Hambantota, Sri Lanka	18 September 2012 ‡
3	4.2	Rangana Herath	5	3	21	New Zealand	Zohur Ahmed Chowdhury Stadium, Chittagong, Bangladesh	31 March 2014 ‡
4	4.8	Lasith Malinga	5	31	24	England	Pallekele International Cricket Stadium, Kandy, Sri Lanka	1 October 2012 ‡
4	4.8	Lasith Malinga	5	6	24	New Zealand	Pallekele International Cricket Stadium, Kandy, Sri Lanka	6 September 2019
4	4.8	Nuwan Thushara †	5	20	24	Bangladesh	Sylhet International Cricket Stadium, Sylhet, Bangladesh	9 March 2024
Last Updated: 18 October 2024

=== Worst figures in an innings ===
The worst figures in a T20I came in the Sri Lanka's tour of Australia when Kasun Rajitha of Sri Lanka had figures of 0/75 off his four overs at Adelaide Oval, Adelaide.

Rank	Figures	Player	Overs	Opposition	Venue	Date
1	0/75	Kasun Rajitha †	4	Australia	Adelaide Oval, Adelaide, Australia	27 October 2019
2	0/64	Sanath Jayasuriya	4	Pakistan	New Wanderers Stadium, Johannesburg, South Africa	17 September 2007 ‡
3	0/54	Lasith Malinga	4	West Indies	Ranasinghe Premadasa Stadium, Colombo, Sri Lanka	7 October 2012 ‡
4	0/53	Akila Dananjaya	4	West Indies	Coolidge Cricket Ground, Saint George, Antigua	7 March 2021
5	0/52	Ajantha Mendis	4	England	Zohur Ahmed Chowdhury Stadium, Chittagong, Bangladesh	27 March 2014 ‡
Last Updated: 18 October 2024

=== Most runs conceded in a match ===
Kasun Rajitha also holds the dubious distinction of most runs conceded in a T20I during the aforementioned match.

Rank	Figures	Player	Overs	Opposition	Venue	Date
1	0/75	Kasun Rajitha †	4	Australia	Adelaide Oval, Adelaide, Australia	27 October 2019
2	0/64	Sanath Jayasuriya	4	Pakistan	New Wanderers Stadium, Johannesburg, South Africa	17 September 2007 ‡
3	2/62	Akila Dananjaya †	4	West Indies	Coolidge Cricket Ground, Saint George, Antigua	3 March 2021
4	2/61	Nuwan Pradeep	4	India	Holkar Stadium, Indore, India	22 December 2017
5	1/58	Thisara Perera	4	Australia	Pallekele International Cricket Stadium, Kandy, Sri Lanka	6 September 2016
Last updated:18 October 2024

=== Most wickets in a calendar year ===
Sri Lanka's Wanindu Hasaranga holds the record for most wickets taken in a year when he took 36 wickets in 2021, 34 wickets in 2022 & 23 wickets in 2024. Dushmantha Chameera with 22 wickets in 2021 and Maheesh Theekshana in 2022 jointly hold the Sri Lankan record for most wickets in a year.

Rank	Wickets	Player	Matches	Year
1	38	Wanindu Hasaranga	20	2024
2	36	Wanindu Hasaranga	20	2021
3	34	Wanindu Hasaranga	19	2022
4	30	Matheesha Pathirana	18	2024
5	24	Maheesh Theekshana	21	2024
Last Updated: 30 December 2024

=== Most wickets in a series ===
2019 ICC World Twenty20 Qualifier at UAE saw records set for the most wickets taken by a bowler in a T20I series when Oman's pacer Bilal Khan tool 18 wickets during the series. Hasaranga in the 2021 ICC World Twenty20 took 16 wickets, the most for a Sri Lankan bowler in a series.

Rank	Wickets	Player	Matches	Series
1	16	Wanindu Hasaranga	8	2021 ICC Men's T20 World Cup
2	15	Ajantha Mendis	6	2012 ICC World Twenty20
2	15	Wanindu Hasaranga	8	2022 ICC Men's T20 World Cup
3	12	Ajantha Mendis	7	2009 ICC World Twenty20
3	12	Lasith Malinga †	7	2009 ICC World Twenty20
4	11	Ajantha Mendis	3	2008 Quadrangular Twenty20 Series in Canada
Last Updated: 18 October 2024

=== Hat-trick ===
In cricket, a hat-trick occurs when a bowler takes three wickets with consecutive deliveries. The deliveries may be interrupted by an over bowled by another bowler from the other end of the pitch or the other team's innings, but must be three consecutive deliveries by the individual bowler in the same match. Only wickets attributed to the bowler count towards a hat-trick; run outs do not count. In T20Is history there have been just 13 hat-tricks, the first achieved by Brett Lee for Australia against Bangladesh in 2007 ICC World Twenty20.

S. No	Bowler	Against	Wickets	Venue	Date	Ref.
1	Thisara Perera	India	Hardik Pandya (c Sachithra Senanayake); Suresh Raina (c Dushmantha Chameera); Yuvraj Singh (c Danushka Gunathilaka)	(India) JSCA International Stadium Complex, Ranchi	12 February 2016	
2	Lasith Malinga	Bangladesh	Mushfiqur Rahim (b); Mashrafe Mortaza (b); Mehedi Hasan (lbw)	(Sri Lanka) R. Premadasa Stadium, Colombo	6 April 2017	
3	Lasith Malinga	New Zealand	Colin Munro (b); Hamish Rutherford (lbw); Colin de Grandhomme (b); Ross Taylor (lbw)	(Sri Lanka) Pallekele International Cricket Stadium, Kandy	6 September 2019	
4	Akila Dananjaya	West Indies	Evin Lewis (c Danushka Gunathilaka); Chris Gayle (lbw); Nicholas Pooran (c †Niroshan Dickwella)	(Antigua and Barbuda) Coolidge Cricket Ground, Antigua	3 March 2021	
5	Wanindu Hasaranga	South Africa	Aiden Markram (b); Temba Bavuma (c Pathum Nissanka); Dwaine Pretorius (c Bhanuka Rajapaksa)	(United Arab Emirates) Sharjah Cricket Stadium, Sharjah	30 October 2021 ‡	
6	Nuwan Thushara	Bangladesh	Najmul Hossain Shanto (b); Towhid Hridoy (b); Mahmudullah (lbw)	(Bangladesh) Sylhet International Cricket Stadium	9 March 2024	
Last Updated: 18 October 2024

== Wicket-keeping records ==
The wicket-keeper is a specialist fielder who stands behind the stumps being guarded by the batsman on strike and is the only member of the fielding side allowed to wear gloves and leg pads.

=== Most career dismissals ===
A wicket-keeper can be credited with the dismissal of a batsman in two ways, caught or stumped. A fair catch is taken when the ball is caught fully within the field of play without it bouncing after the ball has touched the striker's bat or glove holding the bat, Laws 5.6.2.2 and 5.6.2.3 state that the hand or the glove holding the bat shall be regarded as the ball striking or touching the bat while a stumping occurs when the wicket-keeper puts down the wicket while the batsman is out of his ground and not attempting a run. Kumar Sangakkara is the highest ranked Sri Lankan wicket keeper in the all-time list of taking most dismissals in T20Is as a designated wicket-keeper, which is headed by India's MS Dhoni and West Indian Denesh Ramdin.

Rank	Dismissals	Player	Matches	Innings	Period
1	54	Kusal Mendis †	103	73	2016-2026
2	45	Kumar Sangakkara	56	56	2006-2014
3	24	Dinesh Chandimal†	68	32	2012-2022
4	16	Kusal Perera†	65	31	2015-2021
5	12	Niroshan Dickwella †	28	20	2016-2021
Last updated: 16 February 2026

=== Most career catches ===
Sangakkara has taken the most catches in T20Is as a designated wicket-keeper with Dhoni and Ramdin leading the all-time list.

Rank	Catches	Player	Matches	Innings	Period
1	34	Kusal Mendis †	103	73	2016-2026
2	25	Kumar Sangakkara	56	56	2006-2014
3	15	Dinesh Chandimal †	61	25	2012-2021
4	11	Niroshan Dickwella †	28	20	2016-2021
5	10	Kusal Perera †	60	31	2015-2021
Last Updated: 16 February 2026

=== Most career stumpings ===
Sangakkara has made the most stumpings in T20Is as a designated wicket-keeper among Sri Lankan wicket-keepers with Dhoni and Kamran Akmal of Pakistan heading this all-time list.

Rank	Stumpings	Player	Matches	Innings	Period
1	20	Kumar Sangakkara	56	56	2006-2014
1	20	Kusal Mendis †	103	73	2016-2026
2	6	Kusal Perera †	60	31	2015-2021
3	5	Dinesh Chandimal †	61	25	2012-2021
4	2	Tillakaratne Dilshan	80	5	2008-2009
4	2	Sadeera Samarawickrama †	9	4	2017-2021
Last Updated: 16 February 2026

=== Most dismissals in an innings ===
Four wicket-keepers on four occasions have taken five dismissals in a single innings in a T20I.

The feat of taking 4 dismissals in an innings has been achieved by 19 wicket-keepers on 26 occasions with Dinesh Chandimal being the only Sri Lankan wicket-keeper.

Rank	Dismissals	Player	Opposition	Venue	Date
1	4	Dinesh Chandimal †	South Africa	New Wanderers Stadium, Johannesburg, South Africa	22 January 2017
2	3	Kumar Sangakkara	Ireland	Lord's, London, England	14 June 2009
2	3	Kumar Sangakkara	Australia	WACA Ground, Perth, Australia	31 October 2010
2	3	Kumar Sangakkara	Pakistan	Dubai International Cricket Stadium, Dubai, UAE	13 December 2013
2	3	Kusal Perera †	Bangladesh	Ranasinghe Premadasa Stadium, Colombo, Sri Lanka	16 March 2018
2	3	Dinesh Chandimal †	South Africa	Ranasinghe Premadasa Stadium, Colombo, Sri Lanka	14 August 2018
2	3	Kusal Mendis †	New Zealand	Rangiri Dambulla International Stadium, Dambulla, Sri Lanka	9 November 2024
2	3	Kusal Mendis †	New Zealand	Bay Oval, Mount Maunganui, New Zealand	28 December 2024
Last Updated: 28 December 2024

=== Most dismissals in a series ===
Netherlands wicket-keeper Scott Edwards holds the T20Is record for the most dismissals taken by a wicket-keeper in a series. He made 13 dismissals during the 2019 ICC World Twenty20 Qualifier. Sri Lankan record is held by Sangakkara when he made 9 dismissals during the 2009 ICC World Twenty20.

Rank	Dismissals	Player	Matches	Innings	Series
1	9	Kumar Sangakkara	7	7	2009 ICC World Twenty20
2	7	Kumar Sangakkara	7	7	2012 ICC World Twenty20
3	6	Tillakaratne Dilshan	4	4	2008 Quadrangular Twenty20 Series in Canada
3	6	Kusal Mendis	8	8	2022 ICC Men's T20 World Cup
4	5	Dinesh Chandimal †	3	3	Sri Lanka in South Africa in 2016-17
5	4	Kumar Sangakkara	5	5	2007 ICC World Twenty20
5	4	Dinesh Chandimal †	4	3	2016 Asia Cup
5	4	Minod Bhanuka	3	3	India in Sri Lanka in 2021
5	4	Kusal Perera	8	8	ICC Men's T20 World Cup
5	4	Kusal Mendis †	3	3	West Indian in Sri Lanka in 2024
5	4	Kusal Mendis †	3	3	New Zealand in Sri Lanka in 2024
5	4	Kusal Mendis †	3	3	Sri Lanka in New Zealand in 2025
Last Updated: 2 January 2025

== Fielding records ==
=== Most career catches ===
Caught is one of the nine methods a batsman can be dismissed in cricket. (Note: In 2017, The Laws of Cricket were amended, reducing the methods of dismissals from ten to nine, with handled the ball now covered as part of obstructing the field.) The majority of catches are caught in the slips, located behind the batsman, next to the wicket-keeper, on the off side of the field. Most slip fielders are top order batsmen.

South Africa's David Miller holds the record for the most catches in T20Is by a non-wicket-keeper with 62, followed by New Zealand's Martin Guptill with 58 and Shoaib Malik of Pakistan on 50. Thisara Perera is the leading catcher for Sri Lanka.

Rank	Catches	Player	Matches	Period
1	49	Dasun Shanaka †	127	2015-2026
2	37	Wanindu Hasaranga†	95	2019-2024
3	29	Thisara Perera	80	2010-2021
4	26	Tillakaratne Dilshan	75	2006-2016
4	26	Angelo Mathews	85	2009-2024
5	21	Danushka Gunathilaka†	45	2016-2022
5	21	Lasith Malinga	84	2006-2020
Last Updated: 16 February 2026

==== Most catches in an innings ====
The feat of taking 4 catches in an innings has been achieved by 14 fielders on 14 occasions with Chandimal being the only Sri Lankan fielder.

Rank	Dismissals	Player	Opposition	Venue	Date
1	4	Dinesh Chandimal †	Bangladesh	Zohur Ahmed Chowdhury Stadium, Chittagong, Bangladesh	14 February 2014
2	3	Chamara Kapugedera	Australia	Adelaide Oval, Adelaide, Australia	22 February 2017
2	3	Danushka Gunathilaka†	Pakistan	Gaddafi Stadium, Lahore, Pakistan	5 October 2019
2	3	Danushka Gunathilaka†	England	The Rose Bowl, Southampton, England	26 June 2021
2	3	Pathum Nissanka †	India	Dubai International Cricket Stadium, Dubai, UAE	6 September 2022
2	3	Charith Asalanka †	Bangladesh	Sylhet International Cricket Stadium, Sylhet, Bangladesh	4 March 2024
4	2	23 Sri Lankan fielders on 46 occasions took 2 catches in an inning.			
Last Updated: 18 October 2024

==== Most catches in a series ====
The 2019 ICC Men's T20 World Cup Qualifier, which saw Netherlands retain their title, saw the record set for the most catches taken by a non-wicket-keeper in a T20I series. Jersey's Ben Stevens and Namibia's JJ Smit took 10 catches in the series. Thisara Perera with 6 catches in the 2018 Nidahas Trophy is the leading Sri Lankan fielder on this list.

Rank	Catches	Player	Matches	Innings	Series
1	9	Dasun Shanaka	8	8	2022 ICC Men's T20 World Cup
2	6	Thisara Perera	4	4	2018 Nidahas Trophy
3	5	Pathum Nissanka	6	6	2022 Asia Cup
3	5	Dasun Shanaka	5	5	2025 Pakistan T20I Tri-Nation Series
5	4	19 separate incidents			
Last Updated: 13 January 2026

== Other records ==
=== Most career matches ===
India's Rohit Sharma holds the record for the most T20I matches played with 148, followed by Shoaib Malik of Pakistan with 124 and Martin Guptil of New Zealand with 122 games. Dasun is the most experienced Sri Lankan player having represented the team on 121 occasions.

Rank	Matches	Player	Runs	Wkts	Period
1	127	Dasun Shanaka†	1,797	43	2015-2026
2	103	Kusal Mendis†	2,593	–	2016-2026
3	95	Wanindu Hasaranga†	807	154	2019-2026
4	94	Kusal Perera†	2,313	–	2013-2026
5	90	Angelo Mathews	1,416	45	2009-2024
Last Updated: 16 February 2026

=== Most consecutive career matches ===
Afghanistan's Mohammad Shahzad and Asghar Afghan hold the record for the most consecutive T20I matches played with 58. Angelo Mathews holds the Sri Lankan record.

Rank	Matches	Player	Period
1	55	Angelo Mathews	2009-2015
2	48	Dasun Shanaka	2020-2023
3	37	Chamika Karunaratne	2021-2022
4	31	Dushmantha Chameera	2020-2022
5	28	Thisara Perera	2011-2014
Last updated: 8 April 2023

=== Most matches as captain ===
MS Dhoni, who led the Indian cricket team from 2007 to 2016, holds the record for the most matches played as captain in T20Is with 72. Dasun Shanaka has led Sri Lanka in 46 matches, the most for any player from his country.

Rank	Matches	Player	Won	Lost	Tied	NR	Win %	Period
1	61	Dasun Shanaka	28	31	2	0	45.9	2019-2026
2	26	Dinesh Chandimal	13	13	0	0	50.00	2013-2018
3	24	Lasith Malinga	7	15	1	1	32.61	2014-2020
4	22	Kumar Sangakkara	13	9	0	0	59.09	2009-2012
5	19	Mahela Jayawardene	12	6	1	0	65.79	2006-2012
Last Updated: 16 February 2026

==== Most man of the match awards ====
Rank	M.O.M. Awards	Player	Matches	Period
1	8	Kusal Mendis†	103	2016–2026
2	8	Kusal Perera†	94	2013–2026
2	8	Wanindu Hasaranga†	95	2019–2026
4	6	Sanath Jayasuriya	31	2006–2011
4	6	Mahela Jayawardene	55	2006–2014
4	6	Charith Asalanka†	55	2021–2025
4	6	Tillakaratne Dilshan	80	2006–2016
4	6	Angelo Mathews	90	2009–2024
Last updated: 16 February 20265

==== Most man of the series awards ====
Rank	M.O.S. Awards	Player	Matches	Period
1	5	Wanindu Hasaranga†	76	2019–2024
2	2	Kusal Mendis†	75	2016–2024
2	2	Tillakaratne Dilshan	80	2006—2016
Last updated: 22 September 2024

=== Youngest players on Debut ===
The youngest player to play in a T20I match is Marian Gherasim at the age of 14 years and 16 days. Making his debut for Romania against the Bulgaria on 16 October 2020 in the first T20I of the 2020 Balkan Cup thus becoming the youngest to play in a men's T20I match.

Rank	Age	Player	Opposition	Venue	Date
1	18 years and 359 days	Akila Dananjaya	New Zealand	Pallekele International Cricket Stadium, Kandy, Sri Lanka	27 September 2012
2	19 years and 111 days	Chamara Kapugedera	England	Rose Bowl, Southampton, England	15 June 2006
3	19 years and 252 days	Matheesha Pathirana	Afghanistan	Dubai International Cricket Stadium, Dubai, Dubai	27 August 2022
4	20 years and 18 days	Binura Fernando	Pakistan	R. Premadasa Stadium, Colombo, Sri Lanka	30 July 2015
5	20 years and 27 days	Kamindu Mendis	England	R. Premadasa Stadium, Colombo, Sri Lanka	27 October 2018
Last Updated: 12 September 2022

=== Oldest Players on Debut ===
The Turkish batsmen Osman Göker is the oldest player to make their debut a T20I match. Playing in the 2019 Continental Cup against Romania at Moara Vlasiei Cricket Ground, Moara Vlăsiei he was aged 59 years and 181 days.

Rank	Age	Player	Opposition	Venue	Date
1	36 years and 350 days	Sanath Jayasuriya	England	Rose Bowl, Southampton, England	15 June 2006
2	36 years and 30 days	Marvan Atapattu	New Zealand	Westpac Stadium, Wellington, New Zealand	22 December 2006
3	35 years and 161 days	Indika de Saram	India	Ranasinghe Premadasa Stadium, Colombo, Sri Lanka	10 February 2009
4	34 years and 343 days	Jeevantha Kulatunga	Zimbabwe	Maple Leaf North-West Ground, King City, Canada	10 October 2008
5	34 years and 249 days	Muttiah Muralitharan	New Zealand	Basin Reserve, Wellington, New Zealand	22 December 2006
Last Updated: 9 August 2020

=== Oldest Players ===
The Turkish batsmen Osman Göker is the oldest player to appear in a T20I match during the same above mentioned match.

Rank	Age	Player	Opposition	Venue	Date
1	41 years and 360 days	Sanath Jayasuriya	England	Bristol County Ground, Bristol, England	25 June 2011
2	39 years and 331 days	Tillakaratne Dilshan	Australia	Ranasinghe Premadasa Stadium, Colombo, Sri Lanka	9 September 2016
3	38 years and 197 days	Muttiah Muralitharan	Australia	WACA Ground, Perth, Australia	31 October 2010
4	38 years and 9 days	Rangana Herath	South Africa	Arun Jaitley Stadium, Delhi, India	28 March 2016
5	36 years and 314 days	Mahela Jayawardene	India	Sher-e-Bangla National Cricket Stadium, Mirpur, Bangladesh	6 April 2014
Last Updated: 9 August 2020

== Partnership records ==
In cricket, two batsmen are always present at the crease batting together in a partnership. This partnership will continue until one of them is dismissed, retires or the innings comes to a close.

=== Highest partnerships by wicket ===
A wicket partnership describes the number of runs scored before each wicket falls. The first wicket partnership is between the opening batsmen and continues until the first wicket falls. The second wicket partnership then commences between the not out batsman and the number three batsman. This partnership continues until the second wicket falls. The third wicket partnership then commences between the not out batsman and the new batsman. This continues down to the tenth wicket partnership. When the tenth wicket has fallen, there is no batsman left to partner so the innings is closed.

Wicket	Runs	First batsman	Second batsman	Opposition	Venue	Date
1st Wicket	124	Sanath Jayasuriya	Tillakaratne Dilshan	West Indies	Trent Bridge, Nottingham, England	10 June 2009 ‡
2nd Wicket	166	Kumar Sangakkara	Mahela Jayawardene	West Indies	Kensington Oval, Bridgetown, Barbados	7 May 2010 ‡
3rd Wicket	117*	Kusal Perera	Kamil Mishara	Zimbabwe	Harare Sports Club, Harare, Zimbabwe	7 September 2025
4th Wicket	123	Pathum Nissanka	Wanindu Hasaranga	Ireland	Sheikh Zayed Cricket Stadium, Abu Dhabi, UAE	20 October 2021 ‡
5th Wicket	118	Charith Asalanka	Angelo Mathews	Zimbabwe	R.Premadasa Stadium, Colombo, Sri Lanka	16 January 2024
6th Wicket	97	Kusal Perera	Thisara Perera	Bangladesh	Ranasinghe Premadasa Stadium, Colombo, Sri Lanka	16 March 2018
7th Wicket	69*	Dasun Shanaka	Chamika Karunaratne	Australia	Pallekele, Kandy, Sri Lanka	11 June 2022
8th Wicket	46	Akila Dananjaya	Isuru Udana	South Africa	Centurion Park, Centurion, South Africa	22 March 2019
9th Wicket	44	Dilhara Fernando	Lasith Malinga	New Zealand	Eden Park, Auckland, New Zealand	26 December 2006
10th Wicket	30	Chamika Karunaratne	Dilshan Madushanka	Afghanistan	Dubai International Cricket Stadium, Dubai, Dubai	27 August 2022
Last Updated: 07 September 2025

=== Highest partnerships by runs ===
The highest T20I partnership by runs for any wicket is held by the Afghan pairing of Hazratullah Zazai and Usman Ghani who put together an opening wicket partnership of 236 runs during the Ireland v Afghanistan series in India in 2019

Wicket	Runs	First batsman	Second batsman	Opposition	Venue	Date
2nd Wicket	166	Mahela Jayawardene	Kumar Sangakkara	West Indies	Kensington Oval, Bridgetown, Barbados	7 May 2010
2nd Wicket	145	Mahela Jayawardene	Tillakaratne Dilshan	England	Zohur Ahmed Chowdhury Stadium, Chittagong, Bangladesh	27 March 2014
2nd Wicket	127	Pathum Nissanka	Kusal Perera	India	Dubai International Cricket Stadium, Dubai, UAE	27 September 2025
1st Wicket	124	Sanath Jayasuriya	Tillakaratne Dilshan	West Indies	Trent Bridge, Nottingham, England	10 June 2009
4th Wicket	123	Pathum Nissanka	Wanindu Hasaranga	Ireland	Sheikh Zayed Cricket Stadium, Abu Dhabi, UAE	20 October 2021 ‡
Last Updated: 27 September 2025

=== Highest overall partnership runs by a pair ===
Rank	Runs	Innings	Players	Highest	Average	100/50	T20I career span
1	2,118	63	Pathum Nissanka & Kusal Mendis †	121	34.16	1/16	2022–2026
2	822	22	Mahela Jayawardene & Kumar Sangakkara	166	41.1	2/3	2007–2014
3	766	31	Tillakaratne Dilshan & Mahela Jayawardene	145	26.41	1/3	2007–2014
4	633	21	Kusal Mendis & Kusal Perera †	106*	31.65	1/3	2018–2025
5	606	22	Tillakaratne Dilshan & Kusal Perera	100	27.54	1/2	2013–2016
An asterisk (*) signifies an unbroken partnership (i.e. neither of the batsmen was dismissed before either the end of the allotted overs or the required score being reached). Last updated: 16 February 2026

== Umpiring records ==
=== Most matches umpired ===
An umpire in cricket is a person who officiates the match according to the Laws of Cricket. Two umpires adjudicate the match on the field, whilst a third umpire has access to video replays, and a fourth umpire looks after the match balls and other duties. The records below are only for on-field umpires.

Ahsan Raza of Pakistan holds the record for the most T20I matches umpired with 64. The most experienced Sri Lankan umpire is Ruchira Palliyaguruge with 40 matches officiated so far.

Rank	Matches	Umpire	Period
1	40	Ruchira Palliyaguruge †	2011-2022
2	36	Kumar Dharmasena	2009-2022
3	33	Raveendra Wimalasiri †	2013-2022
4	29	Ranmore Martinesz	2010-2018
5	14	Lyndon Hannibal †	2018-2022
Last Updated: 9 September 2022

== See also ==
- List of Twenty20 International records
- List of Test cricket records
- List of Cricket World Cup records
- List of One Day International cricket records
