= Khushal =

Khushal is a given name in Persian, Pashto and Hindi meaning "happy".

== Places ==
- Khushal, Gilan, a village in Iran
- Khushal, Mazandaran, a village in Iran
- Khushal Sar, a lake in Jammu and Kashmir, India
- Khushal Khan Mena, suburb in Kabul, Afghanistan

== People ==
- Khushal Khan Gunsamundra, 17th-century musician at the Mughal court
- Khushal Singh (disambiguation)
  - Khushal Singh Singhpuria, Nawab of Singhpuria Misl, Punjab 1753–1795
  - Khushal Singh Jamadar, Chamberlain of Sikh Empire
  - Khushal Singh, thakur of Awa, Rajasthan and active during the 1857 Erinpura revolt
- Khushal Bopche (born 1951), Indian politician
- Khushal Singh Adhikari, Indian politician

== See also ==
- Kushal (disambiguation)
- Khushali (disambiguation)
