= Khushali =

Khushali (also spelled Khushhali, Khushiali), a word originating in Persian (خوشحالی xošhâli), where it means 'happiness, prosperity', can refer to:

== Isma'ili religious festivals ==
- Saligrah Khushiali, birthday of Aga Khan IV
- Imamat Day, assumption of the Isma'ili imamate by Aga Khan IV

== People ==
=== Real ===
- Khushalii Kumar (born 1988), Indian actress
- Khushali Vyas, a contestant on Ace of Space 2, an Indian reality television show

=== Fictitious ===
- A character in Kesar, an Indian television series

== Ethnic groups ==
- Khushali, a sub-tribe of the Torikhel clan in Pakistan

== Organisations ==
- Khushhali Microfinance Bank, Pakistan

== See also ==
- Khushal (disambiguation)
