= Kusal =

Kusal may refer to

- Kusal Goonewardena, Australian physical therapist and health lecturer
- Kusal Mendis, Sri Lankan cricketer
- Kusal Perera, Sri Lankan cricketer
- Francišak Kušal, Belarusian army officer and politician
- Kusaal language, Gur (Niger–Congo) language spoken in Ghana
- Kusal (film), Sri Lankan film

== See also ==
- Kushal (disambiguation)
