= Kusala =

Kusala may refer to:

- Khutughtu Khan Kusala, the Emperor of China and the 13th Great Khan of the Mongol Empire
- Kusala (leafhopper), a genus of insects in the tribe Erythroneurini
- Kusala, a Buddhist term usually translated as 'wholesome' or 'skillful'

== See also ==
- Kushal (disambiguation)
