= 2018 Nidahas Trophy =

International cricket tournament

- Dates: 6 – 18 March 2018
- Administrator: Sri Lanka Cricket (SLC)
- Cricket format: T20 International
- Tournament format(s): Round-robin and Knockout
- Host: Sri Lanka
- Champions: India (2nd title)
- Runners-up: Bangladesh
- Participants: 3
- Matches: 7
- Player of the series: (India) Washington Sundar
- Most runs: (Sri Lanka) Kusal Perera (204)
- Most wickets: (India) Washington Sundar (8) (India) Yuzvendra Chahal (8)

The 2018 Nidahas Trophy was a T20 cricket tournament that was held in Sri Lanka in March 2018. It was a tri-nation series between Bangladesh, India and Sri Lanka. Each team played each other twice, with two teams progressing to the final. The tournament was played to celebrate Sri Lanka's 70th year of independence; the title derives from the Sinhalese නිදහස් nidahas, meaning "freedom." Sri Lanka Cricket confirmed that the matches would be played as Twenty20 International fixtures. The fixtures and venue were announced in November 2017, with all the matches played at the R. Premadasa Stadium in Colombo. This was the first occasion that Discovery Networks Asia Pacific channel DSport acquired media rights to broadcast live cricket matches involving the Indian cricket team.

India progressed to the final after they beat Bangladesh by 17 runs in the fifth T20I match. Bangladesh joined India in the final, after they beat Sri Lanka by 2 wickets in the final group game. In the final, India beat Bangladesh by four wickets to win the tournament.

== Squads ==
Bangladesh	India	Sri Lanka
Shakib Al Hasan (c); Mahmudullah (vc); Taskin Ahmed; Litton Das; Ariful Haque; Mehidy Hasan; Nurul Hasan; Abu Hider; Rubel Hossain; Tamim Iqbal; Nazmul Islam; Abu Jayed; Imrul Kayes; Mushfiqur Rahim (wk); Mustafizur Rahman; Sabbir Rahman; Soumya Sarkar	Rohit Sharma (c); Shikhar Dhawan (vc); Yuzvendra Chahal; Deepak Hooda; Dinesh Karthik (wk); Manish Pandey; Rishabh Pant (wk); Axar Patel; KL Rahul; Suresh Raina; Vijay Shankar; Mohammed Siraj; Washington Sundar; Shardul Thakur; Jaydev Unadkat	Dinesh Chandimal (c); Suranga Lakmal (vc); Amila Aponso; Dushmantha Chameera; Akila Dananjaya; Dhananjaya de Silva; Danushka Gunathilaka; Jeevan Mendis; Kusal Mendis; Kusal Perera; Thisara Perera; Nuwan Pradeep; Dasun Shanaka; Upul Tharanga; Isuru Udana

Initially, Shakib Al Hasan was ruled out of Bangladesh's squad before the start of the tournament due to injury. He was replaced by Litton Das with Mahmudullah named as captain. However, Shakib rejoined the Bangladesh squad ahead of the sixth T20I match.

Sri Lanka's captain Dinesh Chandimal was given a two-match ban for a slow over-rate following the match against Bangladesh on 10 March 2018. Thisara Perera was named as Sri Lanka's captain in Chandimal's absence.

== Points table ==
Pos	Team	Pld	W	L	T	NR	Pts	NRR
1	India	4	3	1	0	0	6	0.377
2	Bangladesh	4	2	2	0	0	4	−0.293
3	Sri Lanka	4	1	3	0	0	2	−0.085

Source: ESPNcricinfo

== Group stage ==
=== 1st match ===
6 March 2018
19:00 (N)
Scorecard

India; 174/5 (20 overs)	v	Sri Lanka; 175/5 (18.3 overs)
Shikhar Dhawan 90 (49); Dushmantha Chameera 2/33 (4 overs)		Kusal Perera 66 (37); Washington Sundar 2/28 (4 overs)

Sri Lanka won by 5 wickets
R. Premadasa Stadium, Colombo
Umpires: Ranmore Martinesz (SL) and Raveendra Wimalasiri (SL)
Player of the match: Kusal Perera (SL)

- Sri Lanka won the toss and elected to field.
- Vijay Shankar (Ind) made his T20I debut.
- This was Sri Lanka's first win at home against India in T20Is.

=== 2nd match ===
8 March 2018
19:00 (N)
Scorecard

Bangladesh; 139/8 (20 overs)	v	India; 140/4 (18.4 overs)
Litton Das 34 (30); Jaydev Unadkat 3/38 (4 overs)		Shikhar Dhawan 55 (43); Rubel Hossain 2/24 (3.4 overs)

India won by 6 wickets
R. Premadasa Stadium, Colombo
Umpires: Lyndon Hannibal (SL) and Ranmore Martinesz (SL)
Player of the match: Vijay Shankar (Ind)

- India won the toss and elected to field.

=== 3rd match ===
10 March 2018
19:00 (N)
Scorecard

Sri Lanka; 214/6 (20 overs)	v	Bangladesh; 215/5 (19.4 overs)
Kusal Perera 74 (48); Mustafizur Rahman 3/48 (4 overs)		Mushfiqur Rahim 72* (35); Nuwan Pradeep 2/37 (4 overs)

Bangladesh won by 5 wickets
R. Premadasa Stadium, Colombo
Umpires: Ranmore Martinesz (SL) and Raveendra Wimalasiri (SL)
Player of the match: Mushfiqur Rahim (Ban)

- Bangladesh won the toss and elected to field.
- This was Bangladesh's highest score in T20Is.
- This was Sri Lanka's 50th loss in T20Is, becoming the first team to record 50 defeats in T20Is.
- This was Bangladesh's highest successful chase in T20Is and was the fourth highest successful run chase in T20Is.

=== 4th match ===
12 March 2018
19:00 (N)
Scorecard

Sri Lanka; 152/9 (19 overs)	v	India; 153/4 (17.3 overs)
Kusal Mendis 55 (38); Shardul Thakur 4/27 (4 overs)		Manish Pandey 42* (31); Akila Dananjaya 2/19 (4 overs)

India won by 6 wickets
R. Premadasa Stadium, Colombo
Umpires: Lyndon Hannibal (SL) and Ranmore Martinesz (SL)
Player of the match: Shardul Thakur (Ind)

- India won the toss and elected to field.
- Rain reduced the match to 19 overs per side.
- KL Rahul became the first batsman for India to be dismissed hit wicket in T20Is.

=== 5th match ===
14 March 2018
19:00 (N)
Scorecard

India; 176/3 (20 overs)	v	Bangladesh; 159/6 (20 overs)
Rohit Sharma 89 (61); Rubel Hossain 2/27 (4 overs)		Mushfiqur Rahim 72* (55); Washington Sundar 3/22 (4 overs)

India won by 17 runs
R. Premadasa Stadium, Colombo
Umpires: Ranmore Martinesz (SL) and Raveendra Wimalasiri (SL)
Player of the match: Rohit Sharma (Ind)

- Bangladesh won the toss and elected to field.

=== 6th match ===
16 March 2018
19:00 (N)
Scorecard

Sri Lanka; 159/7 (20 overs)	v	Bangladesh; 160/8 (19.5 overs)
Kusal Perera 61 (40); Mustafizur Rahman 2/39 (4 overs)		Tamim Iqbal 50 (42); Akila Dananjaya 2/37 (4 overs)

Bangladesh won by 2 wickets
R. Premadasa Stadium, Colombo
Umpires: Ruchira Palliyaguruge (SL) and Raveendra Wimalasiri (SL)
Player of the match: Mahmudullah (Ban)

- Bangladesh won the toss and elected to field.
- Mushfiqur Rahim (Ban) scored his 1,000th run in T20Is.
- Kusal Perera became the fastest Sri Lankan and the fifth batsman for Sri Lanka to reach 1,000 runs in T20Is (34 innings). He also became the first player to score five T20I fifties against the same opposition.
- Kusal Perera and Thisara Perera set the highest sixth-wicket partnership for Sri Lanka in T20Is (97).

== Final ==
18 March 2018
19:00 (N)
Scorecard

Bangladesh; 166/8 (20 overs)	v	India; 168/6 (20 overs)
Sabbir Rahman 77 (50); Yuzvendra Chahal 3/18 (4 overs)		Rohit Sharma 56 (42); Rubel Hossain 2/35 (4 overs)

India won by 4 wickets
R. Premadasa Stadium, Colombo
Umpires: Ruchira Palliyaguruge (SL) and Raveendra Wimalasiri (SL)
Player of the match: Dinesh Karthik (Ind)

- India won the toss and elected to field.
- Rohit Sharma (Ind) became the tenth batsman to score 7,000 runs in T20s.
- India made the highest successful run-chase for any team in a T20I final.

== Controversy ==
During the sixth T20I match between Sri Lanka and Bangladesh, Shakib Al Hasan accused the umpires for not signalling a no-ball delivery when Isuru Udana bowled two bouncer deliveries to Mustafizur Rahman in the last over of the match, when Bangladesh needed 12 runs off six balls to win. Mahmudullah, who was on the non-striker's end when Mustafizur Rahman was batting, demanded that a no-ball be signalled by the on-field umpires. Shakib later threatened to leave the field and recalled the batsmen from the field as a result of the umpiring errors. Reserve Bangladeshi cricketer Nurul Hasan was also suspected to have breached the code of conduct for arguing with Sri Lankan captain Thisara Perera. It was also revealed that Shakib exchanged insults with Sri Lankan commentator Russell Arnold. The International Cricket Council (ICC) later imposed a 25 percent fine on match fees and issued a demerit point to both Shakib and Nurul Hasan for breaching the code of ethics. After the sixth T20I between Sri Lanka and Bangladesh concluded, the door to the Bangladeshi dressing room was shattered. It was later revealed that Shakib Al Hasan accidentally broke the glass door by pulling it backwards rather than pulling from the forward position.
