= Ramith Rambukwella =

Sri Lankan cricketer

Personal information
- Full name: Ramith Laksen Bandara Rambukwella
- Born: 8 September 1991 (age 35); Kandy, Sri Lanka
- Batting: Left-handed
- Bowling: Right-arm offbreak
- Role: Opening batsman
- Relatives: Keheliya Rambukwella (father)

International information
- National side: Sri Lanka (2013–2016)
- T20I debut (cap 50): 21 November 2013 v New Zealand
- Last T20I: 5 July 2016 v England

Domestic team information
- Years: Team
- 2011–present: Sinhalese Sports Club
- Tamil Union CAC

Career statistics
Competition	T20I	FC	LA
Matches	2	35	38
Runs scored	19	1,028	496
Batting average	19.00	21.87	19.07
100s/50s	0/0	0/6	0/0
Top score	19	91*	49*
Balls bowled	39	4,123	1,356
Wickets	1	81	34
Bowling average	46.00	29.23	31.17
5 wickets in innings	0	2	0
10 wickets in match	0	0	0
Best bowling	1/19	8/102	4/30
Catches/stumpings	0/–	37/–	13/–
Medal record
Representing Sri Lanka
Men's Cricket
Asian Games
Gold medal – first place	2014 Incheon	Team
- Source: Cricinfo, 10 March 2018

Ramith Rambukwella (born 8 September 1991) is a former Sri Lankan first-class cricketer who played for Tamil Union Cricket and Athletic Club and Twenty20 Internationals for Sri Lanka national side. Ramith has been named as a suspect in the allegations of misappropriating approximately Rs. 8 million from Ministry funds to pay salaries and maintain staff, despite these individuals not rendering any official services.

His father Keheliya Rambukwella was a minister and was a member of parliament in Sri Lankan government and has been remanded in 2025 over the same allegation.

== Domestic career ==
In April 2018, he was named in Galle's squad for the 2018 Super Provincial One Day Tournament. In August 2018, he was named in Dambulla's squad the 2018 SLC T20 League.

== International career ==
He made his Twenty20 International (T20I) debut against New Zealand on 21 November 2013 as the 50th T20I cap for Sri Lanka.

Rambukwella, who was in UK with the Sri Lanka A team in July 2016, was called up to Sri Lanka's squad for the T20I against England on 5 July 2016.

== Personal life ==
Rambukwella is married to his longtime partner Natali, where the wedding was celebrated on 3 May 2017 in Galle Face Hotel.

== Arrest and misbehavior ==
In May 2025, Rambukwella was remanded until June 3 by the Colombo Magistrate’s Court following his arrest. The case stems from allegations that during his tenure as Minister of Mass Media, Health, and Environment in 2021–2023, Keheliya Rambukwella appointed several close associates to his personal staff and unlawfully obtained allowances on their behalf. Investigations by the Commission to Investigate Allegations of Bribery or Corruption (CIABOC) revealed that these actions caused a financial loss exceeding Rs. 8 million to the state.

On 18 July 2013, Rambukwella was fined with 50% of his tour fee of the West Indies after causing mild panic on a flight by attempting to open the cabin door at 35,000 feet. He was drunk at that time, where he had mistaken the cabin door for the lavatory, and suggested he had been half-asleep, which is what prompted the error.

In September 2013, he was arrested following a car accident in Colombo, which struck a wall. He was arrested again in March 2018, for involving in drunk driving and assault.
