= Khushal Singh =

Khushal Singh may refer to:

- Khushal Singh Singhpuria, the second chief of Singhpuria Misl from 1753 to 1795
- Khushal Singh Jamadar, a military officer and Chamberlain of the Sikh Empire
- Khushal Singh, thakur of Awa, Rajasthan and active during the 1857 Erinpura revolt

== See also ==
- Khushal (disambiguation)
- Khushal Singh Adhikari, Indian politician
