= New Zealand cricket team in Sri Lanka in 2013–14 =

	Sri Lanka	New Zealand
- Dates: 10 November 2013 – 21 November 2013
Captains	Angelo Mathews	Kyle Mills

One Day International series
- Results: 3-match series drawn 1–1
Most runs	Tillakaratne Dilshan (189)	Tom Latham (99)
Most wickets	Nuwan Kulasekara (5)	Kyle Mills (5)
- Player of the series: Tillakaratne Dilshan (SL)

Twenty20 International series
- Results: Sri Lanka won the 2-match series 1–0
Most runs	Tillakaratne Dilshan (59)	Luke Ronchi (34)
Most wickets	Rob Nicol (1)	Thisara Perera (1)
- Player of the series: Kusal Perera (SL)

The New Zealand cricket team competed against Sri Lanka in a tour consisting of three ODIs and two Twenty20s. It ran from 10 to 21 November 2013.

Regular New Zealand captain Brendon McCullum and former captain Ross Taylor ruled themselves out of the tour to focus on the home Test series against West Indies and India. Kyle Mills was named as the stand-in captain.

== Squads ==
Sri Lanka	New Zealand
Angelo Mathews (c)	Kyle Mills (c)
Tillakaratne Dilshan	Neil Broom
Mahela Jayawardene	Anton Devcich
Nuwan Kulasekara	Andrew Ellis
Lasith Malinga	Mitchell McClenaghan
Kusal Perera	Adam Milne
Ashan Priyanjan	James Neesham
Sachithra Senanayake	Luke Ronchi
Dinesh Chandimal	Corey Anderson
Rangana Herath	Ian Butler
Dimuth Karunaratne	Grant Elliott
Suranga Lakmal	Tom Latham
Ajantha Mendis	Nathan McCullum
Thisara Perera	Colin Munro
Kumar Sangakkara	Rob Nicol
Lahiru Thirimanne	Hamish Rutherford

== ODI Series ==
All times are Indian Standard Time (IST)

=== 1st ODI ===
10 November 2013
14:30
Scorecard

Sri Lanka; 288/8 (50 overs)	v	New Zealand; 13/1 (4.2 overs)
Tillakaratne Dilshan 81 (114); Kyle Mills 3/49 (9 overs)		Tom Latham 4* (16); Lasith Malinga 1/8 (2.2 overs)

No result
Mahinda Rajapaksa International Stadium, Hambantota
Umpires: Bruce Oxenford and Ruchira Palliyaguru

- New Zealand won the toss & elected to field
- Match abandoned due to rain

=== 2nd ODI ===
12 November 2013
14:30
Scorecard

Sri Lanka; 138/1 (23 overs)	v	New Zealand; 203/6 (23 overs)
Kumar Sangakkara 71* (59); Kyle Mills 1/16 (5 overs)		Tom Latham 86 (68); Nuwan Kulasekara 4/34 (5 overs)

New Zealand won by 4 wickets
Mahinda Rajapaksa International Stadium, Hambantota
Umpires: Bruce Oxenford (Aus) and Ruchira Palliyaguru (SL)
Player of the match: Tom Latham

- Sri Lanka won the toss & elected to bat

=== 3rd ODI ===
16 November 2013
09:45
Scorecard

Sri Lanka; 211/8 (33 overs)	v	New Zealand; 126/6 (25 overs)
Tillakaratne Dilshan 53 (50); Nathan McCullum 2/13 (4 overs)		James Neesham 42* (46); Rangana Herath 3/25 (6 overs)

Sri Lanka won by 36 runs (D/L)
Rangiri Dambulla International Stadium, Dambulla
Umpires: Bruce Oxenford (Aus) and Ruchira Palliyaguru (SL)
Player of the match: Sachithra Senanayake

- New Zealand won the toss and elected to field

=== Statistics ===
==== Batting ====
Highest runs

Name	Match	Runs	Average	Highest runs
(Sri Lanka) Tillakaratne Dilshan	3	189	94.50	81
(Sri Lanka) Kumar Sangakkara	3	150	75.00	79
(New Zealand) Tom Latham	3	99	49.50	86
(Sri Lanka) Angelo Mathews	3	74	74.00	74*
(New Zealand) Luke Ronchi	3	72	36.00	49

==== Bowling ====
Highest wicket taker

Name	Match	Wickets	Economy	Best bowling
(Sri Lanka) Nuwan Kulasekara	3	5	5.18	4/34
(New Zealand) Kyle Mills	3	5	5.00	3/49
(Sri Lanka) Sachithra Senanayake	3	4	5.00	2/14
(New Zealand) Mitchell McClenaghan	2	4	7.20	2/34
(Sri Lanka) Rangana Herath	3	3	7.55	3/25

== T20 Series ==
=== 1st T20 ===
19 November 2013
19.00
Scorecard

Sri Lanka	v	New Zealand

Match abandoned without a ball bowled
Pallekele International Cricket Stadium, Kandy
Umpires: Ruchira Palliyaguru (SL) and Raveendra Wimalasiri (SL)

=== 2nd T20 ===
21 November 2013
19.00
Boxscore

Sri Lanka; 143/2 (17.5 overs)	v	New Zealand; 142/7 (20 overs)
Tillakaratne Dilshan 59* (49); Rob Nicol 1/18 (2 overs)		Luke Ronchi 34* (25); Thisara Perera 1/13 (2 overs)

Sri Lanka won by 8 wickets
Pallekele International Cricket Stadium, Kandy
Umpires: Ruchira Palliyaguru (SL) and Raveendra Wimalasiri (SL)
Player of the match: Kusal Perera (SL)

- Sri Lanka won the toss and elected to field.
- T20I debut: Ramith Rambukwella (Sri Lanka)

=== Statistics ===
==== Batting ====
Highest runs

Name	Match	Runs	Average	Highest runs
(Sri Lanka) Tillakaratne Dilshan	1	59	-	59*
(Sri Lanka) Kusal Perera	1	57	57.00	57
(New Zealand) Luke Ronchi	1	34	-	34*
(New Zealand) Anton Devcich	1	30	30.00	30
(New Zealand) Nathan McCullum	1	26	26.00	26

==== Bowling ====
Highest wicket taker

Name	Match	Wickets	Economy	Best bowling
(Sri Lanka) Thisara Perera	1	1	6.50	1/13
(Sri Lanka) Angelo Mathews	1	1	8.50	1/17
(New Zealand) Rob Nicol	1	1	9.00	1/18
(Sri Lanka) Ramith Rambukwella	1	1	4.75	1/19
(Sri Lanka) Rangana Herath	1	1	6.66	1/20
