= Hasaranga =

Hasaranga is a Sri Lankan Sinhalese given name. Notable people with the given name include:

- Buddika Hasaranga (born 1985), Sri Lankan cricketer
- Wanindu Hasaranga (born 1997), Sri Lankan cricketer
