= Sri Lankan cricket team in Australia in 2019–20 =

International cricket tour

	Australia	Sri Lanka
- Dates: 24 October – 1 November 2019
Captains	Aaron Finch	Lasith Malinga

Twenty20 International series
- Results: Australia won the 3-match series 3–0
Most runs	David Warner (217)	Kusal Perera (100)
Most wickets	Pat Cummins (6)	Lasith Malinga (2)
- Player of the series: David Warner (Aus)

The Sri Lanka cricket team toured Australia in October and November 2019 to play three Twenty20 International (T20I) matches. In May 2019, Cricket Australia confirmed the fixtures for the tour with matches being held in Adelaide, Brisbane and Melbourne. Aaron Finch was the captain of the Australian team, while bowler Lasith Malinga captained Sri Lanka.

In the opening match played at Adelaide, Australia recorded their biggest victory in a T20I match, winning by 134 runs off the back of a century by David Warner. They scored 233 runs for the loss of two wickets, before restricting Sri Lanka to 9/99 in their twenty overs. The following game in Brisbane, Australia won by nine wickets, winning the series with a game to spare. Australia won the final match by seven wickets to win the series 3–0. Australian batsman, David Warner ended up with the top run-scorer for the series with 217, and Pat Cummins was the leading wicket-taker with six dismissals.

== Squads ==
T20Is
Australia	Sri Lanka
Aaron Finch (c); Alex Carey (vc, wk); Pat Cummins (vc); Sean Abbott; Ashton Agar; Glenn Maxwell; Ben McDermott; Kane Richardson; D'Arcy Short; Steve Smith; Billy Stanlake; Mitchell Starc; Ashton Turner; ~~Andrew Tye~~; David Warner; Adam Zampa	Lasith Malinga (c); Niroshan Dickwella (wk); Avishka Fernando; Oshada Fernando; Danushka Gunathilaka; Wanindu Hasaranga; Shehan Jayasuriya; Lahiru Kumara; Kusal Mendis; Kusal Perera; Nuwan Pradeep; Bhanuka Rajapaksa; Kasun Rajitha; Dasun Shanaka; Lakshan Sandakan; Isuru Udana

Ahead of the series, Andrew Tye was ruled out of Australia's squad with an elbow injury, with Sean Abbott named as his replacement. After the second game, Glenn Maxwell took an indefinite break from cricket to deal with a mental health issue and D'Arcy Short was named as his replacement.

== Tour match ==
=== 20 over match: Prime Minister's XI vs Sri Lanka ===
24 October 2019
19:10 (N)
Scorecard

Sri Lanka; 8/131 (20 overs)	v	(Australia) Prime Minister's XI; 9/132 (19.5 overs)
Oshada Fernando 38 (25); Dan Christian 2/16 (3 overs)		Harry Nielsen 79 (50); Kasun Rajitha 3/21 (3.5 overs)

Prime Minister's XI won by 1 wicket
Manuka Oval, Canberra
Umpires: Geoff Joshua (Aus) and Troy Penman (Aus)
Player of the match: Harry Nielsen (Prime Minister's XI)

- Sri Lanka won the toss and elected to bat.

== T20I series ==
=== 1st T20I ===
27 October 2019
14:00
Scorecard

Australia; 2/233 (20 overs)	v	Sri Lanka; 9/99 (20 overs)
David Warner 100* (56); Dasun Shanaka 1/10 (1 over)		Dasun Shanaka 17 (18); Adam Zampa 3/14 (4 overs)

Australia won by 134 runs
Adelaide Oval, Adelaide
Umpires: Gerard Abood (Aus) and Paul Wilson (Aus)
Player of the match: David Warner (Aus)

- Sri Lanka won the toss and elected to field.
- Kasun Rajitha's (SL) bowling figures (4-0-75-0) were the most expensive bowling figures in T20Is.
- David Warner (Aus) scored his first century in T20Is.
- In terms of runs, this was Australia's largest victory, and Sri Lanka's biggest defeat in T20Is.

=== 2nd T20I ===
30 October 2019
18:10 (N)
Scorecard

Sri Lanka; 117 (19 overs)	v	Australia; 1/118 (13 overs)
Kusal Perera 27 (19); Adam Zampa 2/20 (4 overs)		David Warner 60* (41); Lasith Malinga 1/23 (3 overs)

Australia won by 9 wickets
The Gabba, Brisbane
Umpires: Gerard Abood (Aus) and Paul Wilson (Aus)
Player of the match: David Warner (Aus)

- Sri Lanka won the toss and elected to bat.

=== 3rd T20I ===
1 November 2019
19:10 (N)
Scorecard

Sri Lanka; 6/142 (20 overs)	v	Australia; 3/145 (17.4 overs)
Kusal Perera 57 (45); Pat Cummins 2/23 (4 overs)		David Warner 57* (50); Nuwan Pradeep 1/20 (3.4 overs)

Australia won by 7 wickets
Melbourne Cricket Ground, Melbourne
Umpires: Shawn Craig (Aus) and Paul Wilson (Aus)
Player of the match: David Warner (Aus)

- Australia won the toss and elected to field.
- David Warner became the first batsman for Australia to score 2,000 runs in T20Is.

== Statistics ==
=== Most runs ===
Rank	Runs	Player	Innings	Average	High Score	Strike Rate	100	50
1	217	(Australia) David Warner	3	217.00+	100*	147.61	1	2
2	101	(Australia) Aaron Finch	3	33.66	64	162.90	0	1
3	100	(Sri Lanka) Kusal Perera	3	33.33	57	125.00	0	1
4	66	(Australia) Steven Smith	2	66.00	53*	146.66	0	1
5	62	(Australia) Glen Maxwell	1	62.00	62	221.42	0	1
Last Updated: 1 December 2019

=== Most wickets ===
Rank	Wickets	Player	Innings	Best	Average	Economy
1	6	(Australia) Pat Cummins	3	2/23	13.16	6.58
2	5	(Australia) Adam Zampa	2	3/14	12.80	5.33
3	4	(Australia) Mitchell Starc	2	2/18	12.50	6.25
4	3	(Australia) Ashton Agar	3	2/27	21.33	5.33
5	2	(Australia) Billy Stanlake	1	2/23	11.50	5.75
5	2	(Australia) Kane Richardson	3	2/25	31.50	5.72
5	2	(Sri Lanka) Lasith Malinga	3	1/22	41.00	7.45
Last Updated: 1 December 2019

Sri Lankan cricket team in India in 2019-20
