= Kusal Perera =

Sri Lankan cricketer (born 1990)

Personal information
- Full name: Mathurage Don Kusal Janith Perera
- Born: 17 August 1990 (age 36); Kalubowila, Sri Lanka
- Height: 5 ft 6 in (1.68 m)
- Batting: Left-handed
- Bowling: Right-arm medium
- Role: Wicket-keeper-batter

International information
- National side: Sri Lanka (2013–present)
- Test debut (cap 130): 28 August 2015 v India
- Last Test: 22 January 2021 v England
- ODI debut (cap 155): 13 January 2013 v Australia
- Last ODI: 9 November 2023 v New Zealand
- T20I debut (cap 48): 26 January 2013 v Australia
- Last T20I: 28 September 2025 v India

Domestic team information
- Years: Team
- Wayamba cricket team
- 2013: Rajasthan Royals (squad no. 8)
- Ruhuna cricket team
- 2019–20: Cumilla Warriors (squad no. 155)
- 2020; 2026: Kandy Royals (squad no. 155)
- 2021: Colombo Stars
- 2022: Galle Gladiators
- 2023–2024: Dambulla Sixers
- 2024–2025; 2026–present: MI Emirates
- 2025: Lahore Qalandars
- 2026: Hyderabad Kingsmen (squad no. 153)
- 2026: Antigua & Barbuda Falcons
- 2026: Janakpur Bolts
- 2026/27–present: Kandahar Warriors

Career statistics
Competition	Test	ODI	T20I	FC
Matches	22	116	88	83
Runs scored	1,177	3,237	2,276	5,203
Batting average	30.97	30.53	27.42	40.33
100s/50s	2/7	6/17	1/16	13/23
Top score	153*	135	101	336
Catches/stumpings	19/8	48/3	25/6	103/23
Medal record
Men's Cricket
Representing Sri Lanka
ICC T20 World Cup
Winner	2014 Bangladesh
South Asian Games
Silver medal – second place	2010 Dhaka	Team
- Source: ESPNcricinfo, 28 September 2025

Mathurage Don Kusal Janith Perera (commonly known as Kusal Perera or Kusal Janith Perera; Sinhala: කුසල් පෙරේරා) (born 17 August 1990), also referred to by his common initials KJP, is a professional Sri Lankan cricketer who currently plays limited overs cricket and is a former ODI cricket captain. He was a key member of the 2014 ICC World Twenty20 winning team.

He scored 153 not out against South Africa in the first Test at Durban in 2019 to snatch the victory from the hands of South Africa by adding 78 runs for the last wicket with Vishwa Fernando in the match in the 4th innings of the Test match. That innings was named as the second-best Test innings of the decade by Wisden in 2019 and he also won the best test performance from ESPNcricinfo for 2019.

In May 2021, he was named as the captain of the Sri Lankan team, ahead of their One Day International (ODI) series against Bangladesh.

== Personal life ==
Perera married his longtime partner Kelani on 3 March 2020 at the Water's Edge hotel, Battaramulla. Having represented the Sri Lanka Police cricket team that won joint champion status in the 2023 Sri Lanka Cricket first-class competition, Perera was appointed to the police service in the rank of chief inspector of police (CIP).

== Early cricket ==
Educated at Kottawa Dharmapala Maha Vidyalaya, and Royal College Colombo, he has represented the latter in the prestigious Royal–Thomian annual cricket encounter. Even though Kusal was a right-handed batsman at the younger age of 11 to 13 years, he later switched his stance to become a left-handed batsman. This switch has been influenced by the batting stance of the Sri Lankan legend, Sanath Jayasuriya - his childhood idol and hero.

== Domestic and T20 career ==
He made his Indian Premier League (IPL) debut playing for Rajasthan Royals in the 2013 IPL season.

Prior to the start of the 2018 IPL season, he was approached by the Sunrisers Hyderabad team to replace their former captain David Warner who was banned for ball-tampering scandal against South Africa. However, he turned down the offer as he was devoted to play in the domestic league matches in Sri Lanka during the period and wanted to make a Test return into the Sri Lankan cricket team for the then upcoming series against West Indies in June 2018. Later, Alex Hales was called up to replace Warner for the 2018 IPL season following the refusal of Kusal Perera.

He is known as a quick scorer, and can hit the ball very hard which has a same batting style of former Sri Lanka legend Sanath Jayasuriya. In a first class match he scored 330 off 270 balls, which is a domestic record.

In March 2018, he was named as the vice-captain of Dambulla's squad for the 2017–18 Super Four Provincial Tournament. The following month, he was also named as the captain of Dambulla's squad for the 2018 Super Provincial One Day Tournament.

In August 2018, he was named as the vice-captain of Kandy's squad the 2018 SLC T20 League. In November 2019, he was selected to play for the Cumilla Warriors in the 2019–20 Bangladesh Premier League. In October 2020, he was drafted by the Kandy Tuskers for the inaugural edition of the Lanka Premier League.

On 23 May 2025, Qualifier 2 at PSL Kusal Perera scored 61 runs in 35 balls hitting seven boundaries and two sixe

During finals of Pakistan Super League Kusal Perera scored match winning half century. He scored unbeaten 62 runs from 31 balls hitting five boundaries and four sixes. Finally due to his knock, Lahore Qalandars won the match by 6 wickets and Pakistan Super League title. Due to his performance, Kusal Perera won player of the match award.

== International career ==
=== Debut years ===
Perera was a part of a 15-man squad that toured Australia in January 2013. He made his One day international debut against Australia in the 2nd ODI on 13 January 2013, replacing the injured Dinesh Chandimal, where he came to bat on number 4 and scored an unbeaten 14 from 16 balls before Sri Lanka won by 8 wickets.

Perera made his T20I debut in the first T20I against Australia in January 2013 and scored 33 from 22 balls before getting caught behind off Australian all rounder, Glenn Maxwell. In this match he hit some aggressive shots and many compared him with Sanath Jayasuriya.

After the retirement of Kumar Sangakkara, his position remained vacant for a new player and Kusal was brought into the team. He made his Test debut for Sri Lanka against India on 28 August 2015. His arrival to the test team was not good at all, when he dropped Indian skipper Virat Kohli, but he went on to take 2 catches and 1 stumping in that innings. He showed his batting talents right on the first innings of the match, where he was the top scorer for Sri Lanka with 56 runs in first innings. In second innings as well, he scored 70 runs to be the 2nd Sri Lankan batsman to score 2 successive half centuries on Test debut after Dinesh Chandimal. But eventually Sri Lanka lost the match and also the series against India.

=== Aggressive opening success ===
On 31 March 2013, T20I match during Bangladesh tour of Sri Lanka, Kusal Perera scored his maiden T20I half century. He scored 64 from 44 balls hitting five boundaries and four sixes. Sri Lanka won the match by 17 runs and Kusal Perera won man of the match award for his performance. On 21 November 2013, New Zealand tour of Sri Lanka, Kusal Perera scored his second T20I half century. While chasing the target of 142 runs, Perera scored 57 runs from 37 balls hitting six boundaries and two sixes. Finally Sri Lanka won the match by 8 wickets and Perera won the man of the match award for his performance.

On 13 December 2013 he scored 84 runs from 59 balls against Pakistan and Sri Lanka and went on to score a massive total of 211. Sri Lanka won the match by 24 runs and Perera earned the Man of the Match for the performance. Perera hit his maiden ODI ton against Bangladesh on 22 February 2014. He scored 106 from 124 balls before getting bowled By Rubel Hossain. He won the Man of the Match award.

On 12 February 2014, against Bangladesh, Perera scored his fourth T20I half century. He scored 64 runs from 44 balls hitting seven boundaries and one six. Finally Sri Lanka won the match by 2 runs and Perera won man of the match award for his performance. On 22 March 2014 against South Africa in 2014 ICC World Twenty20 pool match, Perera scored 61 runs from just 40 balls. Sri Lanka won the match by 5 runs and Perera won the Man of The Match award. He scored 125 runs in the tournament at an average of 20.83 and an impressive strike rate of 145.48. He had some quick runs in the next matches, but failed to effect larger to the team. However, Sri Lanka won their first T20I title by defeating India in the final.

Perera was not qualified for the squad for 2015 ICC Cricket World Cup tournament due to poor performance against India and England. After the tournament starts, Dimuth Karunaratne was injured and Perera was called to the World Cup squad. He played his first World Cup match against Scotland on 11 March 2015, where he scored quick 24 runs. He was replaced to this match due to injury for Dinesh Chandimal against Australia. He opened the batting for Sri Lanka on quarter finals of the World Cup, where he failed again to score runs, only scored 3 runs. Sri Lanka eventually lost the match and quit from the World Cup as well.

After the retirement of two cricket legends Kumar Sangakkara and Mahela Jayawardena from ODIs, Kusal was brought to the squad as the permanent opening batsman with Tillakaratne Dilshan during ODI series against Pakistan. He just lost the first match for quick 26 runs in Dambulla. In the second match at Pallekele, Kusal smashed Pakistani pace bowlers to all the parts of the ground and scored the joint second fastest ODI fifty by 17 balls with his legendary master Sanath Jayasuriya 17-ball fifty in 1997. The shots of Kusal was described by the international commentators as the dawn of a new Little Sana, with just the same aggressive batting by Sanath in the past. The strike rate of Kusal's innings was 272 and it is now the highest strike rate in an innings of 50 or more runs by a Sri Lanka batsman in ODIs, which he also surpassed his master Jayasuriya's strike rate of 271.42 in 1996 against same opposition.

Sri Lanka scored 92 in 9 overs in the match until Kusal departs to 25-ball 68 runs, where Sri Lanka chased down 287 runs and won the match by 2 wickets at the end. This win gave the highest ever ODI run chase in Pallekele and second highest run chase in Sri Lankan soil. During the 2nd ODI match against West Indies, Kusal got out to 99 runs, just one short to his third century. He is the fourth Sri Lankan player to get out in 99 in ODIs, the other three are Kaluwitharana single time, Jayasuriya in two times, and Dilshan single time. He is the 29th of all cricketers to dismissed in 99.

=== Injury concerns ===
Kusal was included to the original squad for 2017 ICC Champions Trophy and played first two pool games as well. However, during the match against India, Kusal suffered by a hamstring injury and he retired hurt after scoring 47 runs. He was immediately ruled out of the Champions Trophy and Dhananjaya de Silva was replaced Kusal in the tournament.

His injuries continuously rose when he entered to the playing eleven. Perera was ruled out of the Bangladesh Tri-series after a side strain occurred during his 49 runs against Zimbabwe on 21 January 2018. Before that, he also scored 80 runs against Zimbabwe, where Sri Lanka lost the match after his wicket. Kusal was injured several times in his career, where he missed many bilateral tournaments in 2016–17 seasons.

=== False doping charge ===
Perera initially tested positive for a banned substance and was recalled from the New Zealand tour in December 2015. His urine sample was provided for a random test by the International Cricket Council during the home series against Pakistan in May 2015. He said that he took some medicine for a leech bite. After the A sample became positive, Kusal himself with the help of the Sri Lanka Cricket Board asked for the testing of the B sample, which was tested at Qatar. On 25 December 2015, the results of the B sample came back and it revealed that Kusal was positive for the banned substance. Meanwhile, Sports Minister Dayasiri Jayasekara informed that there is a conspiracy behind this scandal is to withdraw Kusal from 2016 ICC World Twenty20 tournament due to his effectiveness in the format. If the B sample was positive, he was likely to face a four-year ban.

On 11 May 2016, he was cleared of the charges. The integrity of the laboratory that tested the sample was brought into question, with the ICC hiring an independent expert to find that the lab's outcome was not sustainable. Perera had spent some of his own money on fighting the charges, including travelling to the UK to undergo further tests to clear his name. After being cleared, Perera said "I don't think there has been much damage done to my reputation", after the media, fans and Sri Lankan Cricket Board stood by him. On 6 July, ICC has agreed to support Sri Lanka Cricket and Kusal Perera's claim for costs and damages from the World Anti-Doping Agency (WADA).

=== Ups and downs (2015−2019) ===
After being cleared from suspicion of doping, Kusal replaced injured seamer Dhammika Prasad in Sri Lanka Test squad for the rest of the England tour. He played for the third test at Lord's and scored 42 runs in the first innings. Sri Lanka finally was able to draw the match. Perera scored his maiden Test century on 29 October 2016, against Zimbabwe in the first Test against the, at Harare. The score consisted wide range of thrashing shot, which was compared to Jayasuriya by Zimbabweans who witnessed this for the first time in their soil. Perera devastated the Zimbabwean bowling attack for 15 fours and two sixes, including taking debutant Carl Mumba for five fours in an over after the teabreak.

After poor performances in South African test tour, Perera was dropped from the ODI and T20I squad. He was renamed to the squad in late March 2017 for Bangladesh limited over series, however could not play in ODI series due to hamstring injury. However, he passed fitness test for T20I series and played his comeback match on 4 April 2017. He marked his comeback by strong note with match winning 77 runs off 55 balls, where Sri Lanka won the match by 6 wickets. Perera adjudged man of the match for his performance.

During the first T20I against India in 2018 Nidahas Trophy, he smashed a match-winning 66 runs to chase down India's total of 174. Sri Lanka won the match and Kusal was awarded with man of the match. On 16 March 2018 against Bangladesh in the Tri-series, Kusal recorded his tenth T20I fifty by equaling second most number of T20I fifties by a Sri Lankan. The match was a semi-final encounter between the two sides, where the winner should meet India in the Nidahas Trophy final. Sri Lanka batted first and lost first five wickets for just 41 runs. The team was at the brink of defeating in huge margin against new rivals, Bangladesh. However, Kusal together with stand-in captain Thisara Perera recorded a 97-run partnership for the sixth wicket, which was recorded as the second highest 6th wicket run stand in T20I history and the highest 6th wicket partnership for Sri Lanka in T20Is. The considerable role and rebuilding of team from 41/5 to 159/7 highlighted as one of the great counterattacking efforts T20Is.

During the same match, he broke Kumar Sangakkara's record to become the fastest Sri Lankan to reach 1000 T20I runs (34 innings). Kusal Perera also became the first player to score 5 T20I fifties against a same opposition (Bangladesh) after registering the most number of T20I fifties by any player in T20I history.

In May 2018, he was one of 33 cricketers to be awarded a national contract by Sri Lanka Cricket ahead of the 2018–19 season.

=== Injury in 2018 ===
During the third Test against the West Indies, at Kensington Oval, Perera hurt himself while attempting a catch at the long-on boundary and he intercepted a slog, but finally he lost control with the momentum from his leap taking him beyond the boundary. Then he overbalanced and crashed into the advertising boards, which made him landing awkwardly on his front. He was immediately rushed to hospital for a scan. On next day, team manager Gurusinha spokes that, Kusal has cleared from serious injuries.

On fifth day of the match, Perera came into bat for the sixth wicket, where Sri Lanka still required more than 60 runs to win the match and level the series. Wickets fell in close intervals, but Kusal along with Dilruwan Perera survived the awkward bounce and chest high pitched deliveries and added unbeaten 63 runs for the sixth wicket. Kusal had several bandages around the chest region and showed some pain during the match. However, Sri Lanka won the match and leveled the series 1-1.

During the England tour in October, Perera suffered a quad strain after the second ODI and omitted from the squad. He was replaced by Kusal Mendis in both ODIs and T20Is.

=== Leading batting lineup (2019−2024) ===
On 3 January 2019 against New Zealand, Perera scored his fourth ODI century. The century was recorded as the first century scored by a Sri Lankan after more than a year. Despite his century, Sri Lanka lost the match by 45 runs.

Due to excellent ODI form against New Zealand in 2019, Perera was recalled for the Test series against Australia. During second Test at Canberra, Perera forced to retire hurt after sustaining a nasty blow to the side of the helmet off a Jhye Richardson bouncer. The incidence occurred in the 53rd over, where the ball hitting him flush on the side of the helmet, next to his right ear. Both the side protector and the rear inserts that protect the neck came off the helmet. Even though after immediate medical attention, he continued to bat four more Richardson deliveries, he appeared to be feeling the effects of the blow. With that he decided to retired hurt in that innings and never came to the crease. In the second innings he got out for golden duck off Mitchell Starc.

On 16 February 2019, Perera scored his second test century by giving a thrilling win against South Africa. He scored a fifty in the first innings and in the second innings, South Africa posted 304 runs to win the match. Sri Lanka started the match positively, but wickets at regular intervals eyeing a comfortable win for Proteas. With Dhananjaya de Silva, Perera had a 96-run partnership and Sri Lanka came close to the winning mark. However, after de Silva's wicket and three more quick wickets, the match again shifted to South Africa. Finally, Vishwa Fernando came to the crease as last batsman, where Perera started to accelerate the innings. He scored unbeaten 153 runs and secure a thrilling one wicket win. The 78-run partnership between Perera and Fernando was recorded as the highest last-wicket stand in a successful chase in test cricket history. It was Sri Lanka's second one wicket win in Tests. Kusal Perera's score of 153* recorded as the highest by a Sri Lanka batsman in a successful chase and one of top-10 individual scores in successful chases. Kusal Perera's innings is considered as one of the greatest chases in the history of the game. He won the man of the match award for match winning batting performance. Sri Lanka won the second test with 8 wickets and sealed the series 2–0. Due to top class batting in the first match, Perera adjudged player of the series award and finished as the highest run scorer of the series.

In April 2019, he was named in Sri Lanka's squad for the 2019 Cricket World Cup. During second World cup match he scored valuable 78 runs against Afghanistan. Sri Lankan batting line up fell to the Afghan spinners and only scored 201 in their 50 overs. However, with excellent bowling by Nuwan Pradeep and Lasith Malinga, Sri Lanka won the match by 34 runs in DLS method. He finished the tournament as the leading run-scorer for Sri Lanka, with 273 runs in seven matches.

On 26 July 2019, Bangladesh tour of Sri Lanka, in 1st ODI match Kusal Perera scored his 5th ODI century. It was Lasith Malinga's last ODI match. He scored 111 runs including 17 boundaries and one six. Sri Lanka won the match by 91 runs and won man of the match award for his performance. On 1 November 2019, 3rd T20I match of Sri Lanka tour of Australia, Kusal Perera scored fighting half century. His 11th T20I half century, he scored 57 runs from 45 balls hitting four boundaries and one six and half century helped to a decent target to Sri Lanka team but Sri Lanka lost the match by 7 wickets and also lose the series. He was the highest run scorer in the series for Sri Lankan scoring 100 runs in three matches with average of 33.33.

On 4 March 2020 during first T20I against West Indies, Perera scored his 12th T20I fifty. Sri Lanka's first five wickets fell apart for 45 runs in the chase. However, Perera along with Wanindu Hasaranga had a partnership of 87 off 57 balls where Sri Lanka back in the chase. However Perera dismissed for 66 off 38 and Hasaranga for 44 off 34, West Indies finally won the match by 25 runs. On 29 December, during Sri Lanka tour of South Africa on 1st test match, in second innings, Kusal Perera scored 1000 test runs and he scored his 5th test half century. Despite a fighting knock from him, Sri Lanka lost the match by an innings and 45 runs.

=== ODI captaincy (2021) ===
In May 2021, Perera was appointed as the new ODI captain of Sri Lanka. During this new appointments, former ODI captain Dimuth Karunaratne and senior players like Angelo Mathews and Dinesh Chandimal were omitted from the squad and Kusal Mendis was appointed as the ODI vice captain. During the press conference, Perera explained that the team should play fearless cricket to win matches.

His first tour as a captain came through 3-match ODI series against Bangladesh. In the first two ODIs, Perera scored thirties and Sri Lanka lost both matches. With that defeat, Bangladesh made their first ever series win against Sri Lanka in any format. However, in third ODI on 28 May 2021, Perera scored his sixth ODI century and guided team to a commanding total of 286. Finally Sri Lanka won the match by 97 runs and made their first points in the ODI Super League points table.

=== Post captaincy (2021−Present) ===
First ODI match against England, Kusal Perera scored 3000 ODI runs. During that process, he scored his 15th ODI half century and put 99 run stand with Wanidu Hasaranga. After the loss of both T20Is and ODIs, he was released from the captaincy and Dasun Shanaka was appointed as the limited overs captain for Indian series at home. In September 2021, Perera was named in Sri Lanka's squad for the 2021 ICC Men's T20 World Cup.

During world cup match against Netherlands, Perera took two catches and scored unbeaten 33 runs from 24 balls. He hit six boundaries and brought 8 wicket victory for Sri Lanka. In the T20I World cup match against Australia, Perera scored 35 runs in losing cause. During his innings he hit 50 sixes in T20I, becoming first Sri Lankan to do so.

On 2 April 2023, Perera came to the T20 squad after 15 months after recovering from his injuries. He scored his 13th T20I half century against New Zealand. He scored unbeaten 53 runs from 45 balls. Finally Sri Lanka won the match in the super over. He is the highest run scorer in this series for Sri Lanka scoring 121 runs including one half century with the average of 60.50.

In September 2023, he was selected in Sri Lanka's squad for the 2023 Cricket World Cup.

On 17 October 2024 against West Indies in the third T20I, Perera made a match winning knock of an unbeaten 55 runs: his fifteenth fifty in T20Is, where he guided Sri Lanka to the victory and clinched the series 2–1. This is the first bilateral T20I series win over West Indies as well.

On 2 January 2025, third T20I match against New Zealand, Kusal Perera scored his maiden T20I century eventually becoming third Sri Lankan batsman after Mahela Jayawardene and Tillakaratne Dilshan. He scored 101 runs in 46 balls and the fastest ever by a Sri Lankan. In the same match he scored 2000 T20I runs becoming first Sri Lankan male cricketer to achieve that feat. Finally, Sri Lanka won the match by 7 runs and Perera won the player of the match award.

In February 2026, Perera was named Sri Lanka's squad for the 2026 ICC Men's T20 World Cup, in the tournament he played 2 matches, against Australia where he scored 1 run of 3 balls & against Zimbabwe 22 runs of 14 with 4 fours, Averaging 11.5 with the bat at a Strike Rate of 135.29 and taking 2 catches, because of his poor form throughout the World Cup he was eventually informed by Sri Lanka Cricket that he was not in consideration for any formats for the national team.
