= Kushal =

Kushal may refer to:

- Kushal, Iran, a village in Iran
- Kushal, an Indian given name, a variant of Kaushal; for list of people with the name, see
- A phonetic transliteration of the Belarusian surname Kušal

== See also ==
- Khushal (disambiguation)
- Kusal (disambiguation)
