= Khushal Khan Mena =

Neighborhood of Kabul, Afghanistan

Khushal Khan Mena خوشحال خان مېنه
- Neighborhood of Kabul
- Country: Afghanistan
- Province: Kabul

Khushal Khan Mena (Pashto: خوشحال خان مېنه) is located in the western suburbs of Kabul, Afghanistan, adjacent to Kabul University. It is an old area that is mostly populated by ethnic Pashtuns.

== Terminology ==
The neighborhood is named after a renowned Pashto poet and warrior, Khushal Khan Khattak. Although the official name is Khushal Khan Khattak Mena, it is usually called Khushal Khan by the residents.
