= Isle of Man cricket team in Spain in 2022–23 =

International cricket tour

	Spain	Isle of Man
- Dates: 24 – 26 February 2023
Captains	Christian Munoz-Mills	Matthew Ansell (Note: Carl Hartmann captained Isle of Man in the fifth and sixth T20Is.)

Twenty20 International series
- Results: Spain won the 6-match series 5–0
Most runs	Mohammad Ihsan (237)	Adam McAuley (89)
Most wickets	Mohammad Kamran (10)	Joseph Burrows (6)

The Isle of Man men's cricket team toured Spain in February 2023 to play a six-match Twenty20 International (T20I) series against Spain. The venue for the series was the La Manga Club Ground in Atamaria, within Spain's Murcia region. Spain won the series 5–0 with one match washed out by rain. A number of records were broken in the final match of the series, in which Isle of Man were bowled a for just 10 runs and Spain completed their chase in just two legitimate deliveries.

== Squads ==
Spain	Isle of Man
Christian Munoz-Mills (c); Awais Ahmed (wk); Adam Algar (wk); ~~Yasir Ali~~; Lorne Burns; ~~Hamza Dar~~; ~~Prince Dhiman~~; Daniel Doyle-Calle; Ameer Hamzah; Mohammad Ihsan (wk); Mohammad Kamran; Robiul Khan; Atif Mehmood; Ravi Panchal; Charlie Rumistrzewicz; Shafat Ali Syed; Mohammad Yasin	Matthew Ansell (c); Edward Beard; George Burrows; Joseph Burrows; Jacob Butler; Kieran Cawte; Fraser Clarke; Carl Hartmann (wk); Dollin Jansen; Nathan Knights; Chris Langford; Adam McAuley; Edward Walker; Luke Ward; Christian Webster

== T20I series ==
=== 1st T20I ===
24 February 2023
10:00
Scorecard

Spain; 177/3 (20 overs)	v	Isle of Man; 96 (17.2 overs)
Mohammad Ihsan 102* (59); Joseph Burrows 3/41 (4 overs)		Adam McAuley 30 (33); Daniel Doyle-Calle 2/13 (2 overs)

Spain won by 81 runs
La Manga Club (Bottom Ground), Cartagena
Umpires: Gordon Ashford (Esp) and Darrin Clark (Esp)
Player of the match: Mohammad Ihsan (Esp)

- Spain won the toss and elected to bat.
- Ameer Hamzah, Shafat Ali Syed (Esp) and Fraser Clarke (IoM) all made their T20I debuts.
- Mohammad Ihsan (Esp) scored his first century in T20Is.

=== 2nd T20I ===
24 February 2023
14:15
Scorecard

Spain; 151/3 (16.4 overs)	v	Isle of Man
Daniel Doyle-Calle 39* (19); Jacob Butler 2/29 (3 overs)

No result
La Manga Club (Bottom Ground), Cartagena
Umpires: Gordon Ashford (Esp) and Mark Chappell (Esp)

- Spain won the toss and elected to bat.
- No further play was possible due to rain.
- Edward Walker (IoM) made his T20I debut.

=== 3rd T20I ===
25 February 2023
10:00
Scorecard

Isle of Man; 66 (15.1 overs)	v	Spain; 70/2 (7.1 overs)
Adam McAuley 29 (31); Charlie Rumistrzewicz 4/24 (4 overs)		Mohammad Ihsan 28 (14); Joseph Burrows 2/28 (3.1 overs)

Spain won by 8 wickets
La Manga Club (Bottom Ground), Cartagena
Umpires: Mark Chappell (Esp) and Darrin Clark (Esp)
Player of the match: Charlie Rumistrzewicz (Esp)

- Isle of Man won the toss and elected to bat.
- Christian Webster (IoM) made his T20I debut.

=== 4th T20I ===
25 February 2023
14:15
Scorecard

Isle of Man; 116/8 (20 overs)	v	Spain; 120/4 (15.1 overs)
Edward Beard 33 (32); Mohammad Kamran 5/9 (4 overs)		Christian Munoz-Mills 30* (22); Fraser Clarke 2/14 (3 overs)

Spain won by 6 wickets
La Manga Club (Bottom Ground), Cartagena
Umpires: Mark Chappell (Esp) and Darrin Clark (Esp)
Player of the match: Mohammad Kamran (Esp)

- Isle of Man won the toss and elected to bat.
- Robiul Khan (Esp) made his T20I debut.
- Mohammad Kamran (Esp) took his first five-wicket haul in T20Is.

=== 5th T20I ===
26 February 2023
09:30
Scorecard

Isle of Man; 132/8 (20 overs)	v	Spain; 135/3 (12.3 overs)
Christian Webster 41 (20); Shafat Ali Syed 5/31 (4 overs)		Shafat Ali Syed 51 (23); Jacob Butler 2/24 (3.3 overs)

Spain won by 7 wickets
La Manga Club (Bottom Ground), Cartagena
Umpires: Mark Chappell (Esp) and Darrin Clark (Esp)
Player of the match: Shafat Ali Syed (Esp)

- Spain won the toss and elected to field.
- Shafat Ali Syed (Esp) took his first five-wicket haul in T20Is.

=== 6th T20I ===
26 February 2023
13:45
Scorecard

Isle of Man; 10 (8.4 overs)	v	Spain; 13/0 (0.2 overs)
Joseph Burrows 4 (7); Mohammad Kamran 4/4 (4 overs)		Awais Ahmed 12* (3)

Spain won by 10 wickets
La Manga Club (Bottom Ground), Cartagena
Umpires: Mark Chappell (Esp) and Darrin Clark (Esp)
Player of the match: Atif Mehmood (Esp)

- Spain won the toss and elected to field.
- Luke Ward (IoM) made his T20I debut.
- Mohammad Kamran became the first bowler for Spain to take a hat-trick in T20Is.
- Isle of Man's total (10) was the record lowest total in both T20Is and Twenty20 matches.
- Spain recorded the largest victory in terms of balls remaining (118) in a T20I.
