= Sri Lankan cricket team in Bangladesh in 2013–14 =

| | Bangladesh | Sri Lanka |
- Dates: 27 January 2014 – 22 February 2014
| Captains | Mushfiqur Rahim (Test and ODI); Mashrafe Mortaza (T20I) | Angelo Mathews (Test and ODI); Dinesh Chandimal (T20I) |

Test series
- Result: Sri Lanka won the 2-match series 1–0
| Most runs | Shamsur Rahman (193) | Kumar Sangakkara (499) |
| Most wickets | Shakib Al Hasan (9) | Dilruwan Perera (10) |
- Player of the series: Kumar Sangakkara (SL)

One Day International series
- Results: Sri Lanka won the 3-match series 3–0
| Most runs | Mushfiqur Rahim (136) | Kumar Sangakkara (136) |
| Most wickets | Rubel Hossain (7) | Sachithra Senanayake (5) |
- Player of the series: Sachithra Senanayake (SL)

Twenty20 International series
- Results: Sri Lanka won the 2-match series 2–0
| Most runs | Anamul Haque (82) | Kusal Perera (85) |
| Most wickets | Mashrafe Mortaza (4) | Lasith Malinga (4) |
- Player of the series: Nuwan Kulasekara (SL)

The Sri Lanka cricket team toured Bangladesh from 27 January to 22 February 2014, to play two Test matches, two International Twenty20s and three match One Day Internationals against the Bangladesh national team. In the drawn second Test, Kumar Sangakkara scored a triple century (319).

== Squads ==
| Tests | | ODIs | | T20Is | |
| Sri Lanka | Bangladesh | Sri Lanka | Bangladesh | Sri Lanka | Bangladesh |
|---|---|---|---|---|---|
| Angelo Mathews (Captain); Dinesh Chandimal; Shaminda Eranga; Nuwan Pradeep; Vishwa Fernando; Rangana Herath; Mahela Jayawardene; Prasanna Jayawardene; Dimuth Karunaratne; Suranga Lakmal; Ajantha Mendis; Dilruwan Perera; Kumar Sangakkara; Kaushal Silva; Kithuruwan Vithanage | Mushfiqur Rahim (Captain); Tamim Iqbal; Abdur Razzak; Al-Amin Hossain; Imrul Kayes; Mahmudullah; Marshall Ayub; Mominul Haque; Nasir Hossain; Robiul Islam; Rubel Hossain; Shamsur Rahman; Shakib Al Hasan; Sohag Gazi | Angelo Mathews (Captain); Dinesh Chandimal; Tillakaratne Dilshan; Nuwan Kulasekara; Suranga Lakmal; Lasith Malinga; Ajantha Mendis; Angelo Perera; Kusal Perera; Thisara Perera; Seekkuge Prasanna; Ashan Priyanjan; Kumar Sangakkara; Sachithra Senanayake; Kithuruwan Vithanage | Mushfiqur Rahim (Captain); Tamim Iqbal; Al-Amin Hossain; Anamul Haque; Arafat Sunny; Mahmudullah; Mashrafe Mortaza; Mominul Haque; Naeem Islam; Nasir Hossain; Rubel Hossain; Shafiul Islam; Shamsur Rahman; Shakib Al Hasan; Sohag Gazi | Dinesh Chandimal (Captain); Lasith Malinga; Tillakaratne Dilshan; Rangana Herath; Nuwan Kulasekara; Suranga Lakmal; Angelo Mathews; Ajantha Mendis; Angelo Perera; Kusal Perera; Thisara Perera; Seekkuge Prasanna; Kumar Sangakkara; Sachithra Senanayake; Mahela Jayawardene | Mashrafe Mortaza (Captain); Al-Amin Hossain; Anamul Haque; Arafat Sunny; Farhad Reza; Mahmudullah; Mithun Ali; Mominul Haque; Nasir Hossain; Rubel Hossain; Sabbir Rahman; Shamsur Rahman; Shakib Al Hasan; Sohag Gazi; Tamim Iqbal |

±Late Addition

== Test series ==
=== 1st Test ===
27–31 January 2014
Scorecard

| Bangladesh | v | Sri Lanka |
| 232 (63.5 overs); Mushfiqur Rahim 61 (122); Shaminda Eranga 4/49 (17.4 overs) | | 730/6d (187.5 overs); Mahela Jayawardene 203* (272); Shakib Al Hasan 3/159 (43 overs) |
| 250 (51.5 overs); Mominul Haque 50 (57); Dilruwan Perera 5/109 (19.5 overs) |

Sri Lanka won by an innings and 248 runs
Shere Bangla National Stadium, Mirpur
Umpires: Nigel Llong (Eng) and Paul Reiffel (Aus)
Player of the match: Mahela Jayawardene (SL)

- Sri Lanka won the toss and chose to field.
- Shamsur Rahman (Ban) made his test debut.

=== 2nd Test ===
4–8 February 2014
Scorecard

| Sri Lanka | v | Bangladesh |
| 587 (156.4 overs); Kumar Sangakkara 319 (482); Shakib Al Hasan 5/148 (34 overs) | | 426 (119.5 overs); Imrul Kayes 115 (218); Ajantha Mendis 6/99 (29.5 overs) |
| 305/4d (75.5 overs); Kumar Sangakkara 105 (144); Mahmudullah 2/46 (18 overs) | | 271/3 (84.4 overs); Mominul Haque 100* (167); Dilruwan Perera 2/55 (28 overs) |

Match Drawn
Zahur Ahmed Chowdhury Stadium, Chittagong
Umpires: Nigel Llong (ENG) and Paul Reiffel (AUS)
Player of the match: Kumar Sangakkara (SL)

- Sri Lanka won the toss and elected to bat
- Sri Lanka win test series 1-0

== T20I series ==
=== 1st T20I ===
12 February 2014
17:00 (D/N)
Scorecard

| Sri Lanka; 168/7 (20 overs) | v | Bangladesh; 166/7 (20 overs) |
| Kusal Perera 64 (44); Arafat Sunny 2/17 (3 overs) | | Anamul Haque 58 (45); Nuwan Kulasekara 2/29 (4 overs) |

Sri Lanka won by 2 runs
Zahur Ahmed Chowdhury Stadium, Chittagong
Umpires: Anisur Rahman (BAN) and Sharfuddoula (BAN)
Player of the match: Kusal Perera (SL)

- Bangladesh won the toss and elected to field
- Arafat Sunny (BAN) and Mithun Ali (BAN) made debut

=== 2nd T20I ===
14 February 2014
17:00 (D/N)
Scorecard

| Bangladesh; 120 (19.5 overs) | v | Sri Lanka; 123/7 (20 overs) |
| Sabbir Rahman 26 (36); Lasith Malinga 3/20 (3.5 overs) | | Kumar Sangakkara 37 (38); Mashrafe Mortaza 2/29 (4 overs) |

Sri Lanka won by 3 wickets
Zahur Ahmed Chowdhury Stadium, Chittagong
Umpires: Anisur Rahman (BAN) and Sharfuddoula (BAN)
Player of the match: Thisara Perera (SL)

- Bangladesh won the toss and chose to bat
- Sabbir Rahman (BAN) made T20I debut

== ODI series ==
=== 1st ODI ===
17 February 2014
13:00 (D/N)
Scorecard

| Sri Lanka; 180 (40 overs) | v | Bangladesh; 167 (39.2 overs) |
| Thisara Perera 80* (57); Arafat Sunny 2/31 (6 overs) | | Shamsur Rahman 62 (49); Angelo Mathews 3/21 (7.2 overs) |

Sri Lanka won by 13 runs
Shere Bangla National Stadium, Mirpur
Umpires: Sharfuddoula (BAN) and Rod Tucker (AUS)
Player of the match: Thisara Perera (SL)

- Bangladesh won the toss and chose to field
- Al-Amin Hossain (BAN) and Arafat Sunny (BAN) made ODI debut

=== 2nd ODI ===
20 February 2014
13:00 (D/N)
Scorecard

| Sri Lanka; 289/6 (50 overs) | v | Bangladesh; 228 (43 overs) |
| Kumar Sangakkara 128 (115); Rubel Hossain 3/76 (10 overs) | | Mushfiqur Rahim 79 (83); Sachithra Senanayake 2/33 (8 overs) |

Sri Lanka won by 61 runs
Shere Bangla National Stadium, Mirpur
Umpires: Anisur Rahman (BAN) and Rod Tucker (AUS)
Player of the match: Kumar Sangakkara (SL)

- Sri Lanka won the toss and chose to bat

=== 3rd ODI ===
22 February 2014
13:00 (D/N)
Scorecard

| Bangladesh; 240/8 (50 overs) | v | Sri Lanka; 246/4 (47.3 overs) |
| Mominul Haque 60 (60); Dhammika Prasad 3/49 (10 overs) | | Kusal Perera 106 (124); Mahmudullah 2/38 (10 overs) |

Sri Lanka won by 6 wickets
Shere Bangla National Stadium, Mirpur
Umpires: Sharfuddoula (BAN) and Rod Tucker (AUS)
Player of the match: Kusal Perera (SL)

- Sri Lanka won the toss and chose to field

== Statistics ==
=== Tests and ODIs ===
Sri Lanka

- Kaushal Silva made his 1st Test century in the first innings of the 1st Test.
- Mahela Jayawardene made his 33rd Test century and his 7th Test double-century in the first innings of the 1st Test.
- Kithuruwan Vithanage made his 1st Test century in the first innings of the 1st Test.
- Kumar Sangakkara made his 34th Test century and his 1st Test triple-century in the first innings of the 2nd Test.
- Kumar Sangakkara passed 11,000 Test runs in the first innings of the 2nd Test.
- Kumar Sangakkara made his 35th Test century in the second innings of the 2nd Test.
- Dinesh Chandimal made his 3rd Test century in the second innings of the 2nd Test.
- Kumar Sangakkara made his 17th ODI century in the 2nd ODI.
- Kusal Perera made his 1st ODI century in the 3rd ODI.

Bangladesh

- Shamsur Rahman made his 1st Test century in the first innings of the 2nd Test.
- Imrul Kayes made his 1st Test century in the first innings of the 2nd Test.
- Mominul Haque made his 3rd Test century in the second innings of the 2nd Test.
