= Bangladeshi cricket team in Sri Lanka in 2012–13 =

	Sri Lanka	Bangladesh
- Dates: 3 March 2013 – 31 March 2013

Test series
- Result: Sri Lanka won the 2-match series 1–0
Most runs	Kumar Sangakkara (441)	Mushfiqur Rahim (247)
Most wickets	Rangana Herath (14)	Sohag Gazi (7)
- Player of the series: Kumar Sangakkara (Sri Lanka)

One Day International series
- Results: 3-match series drawn 1–1
Most runs	Tillakaratne Dilshan (248)	Tamim Iqbal (112)
Most wickets	Angelo Mathews (4); Lasith Malinga (4)	Abdur Razzak (5)
- Player of the series: Tillakaratne Dilshan (SL)

Twenty20 International series
- Results: Sri Lanka won the 1-match series 1–0
Most runs	Kushal Janith Perera (64)	Mohammad Ashraful (43)
Most wickets	Angelo Mathews (2); Thisara Perera (2)	Rubel Hossain (1); Sohag Gazi (1); Abdur Razzak (1); Mahmudullah (1)

The Bangladesh cricket team toured Sri Lanka from 3 to 31 March 2013. The tour consisted of two Tests, three One Day Internationals (ODIs) and a Twenty20 International (T20I).

== Test series ==
=== 1st Test ===
8–12 March
Scorecard

Sri Lanka	v	Bangladesh
570/4d (135 overs); Lahiru Thirimanne 155* (256); Sohag Gazi 3/164 (50 overs)		638 (196 overs); Mushfiqur Rahim 200 (328); Tillakaratne Dilshan 2/75 (26 overs)
335/4d (83 overs); Tillakaratne Dilshan 126 (190); Mahmudullah 3/70 (20 overs)		70/1 (22 overs); Jahurul Islam 41 (73); Shaminda Eranga 1/10 (3 overs)

Match drawn
Galle International Stadium, Galle
Umpires: Richard Illingworth (England) and Nigel Llong (England)
Player of the match: Mushfiqur Rahim (Bangladesh)

- Sri Lanka won the toss and elected to bat
- Kithuruwan Vithanage made his Test debut for Sri Lanka; Mominul Haque and Anamul Haque made their Test debuts for Bangladesh

=== 2nd Test ===
16–19 March
Scorecard

Bangladesh	v	Sri Lanka
240 (83.3 overs); Mominul Haque 64 (98); Rangana Herath 5/68 (28.3 overs)		346 (111.3 overs); Kumar Sangakkara 139 (289); Sohag Gazi 3/111 (39 overs)
265 (100.4 overs); Tamim Iqbal 59 (107); Rangana Herath 7/89 (36 overs)		160/3 (41.4 overs); Tillakaratne Dilshan 57 (73); Robiul Islam 2/42 (11 overs)

Sri Lanka won by 7 wickets
R. Premadasa Stadium, Colombo
Umpires: Richard Illingworth (England) and Nigel Llong (England)
Player of the match: Rangana Herath (Sri Lanka)

- Sri Lanka won the toss and elected to field.

== ODI series ==
=== 1st ODI ===
23 March
14:30 (D/N)
Scorecard

Bangladesh; 259/8 (50 overs)	v	Sri Lanka; 238/2 (35.4 overs)
Tamim Iqbal 112 (136); Angelo Mathews 2/36 (9 overs)		Tillakaratne Dilshan 113 (108); Rubel Hossain 1/44 (5 overs)

Sri Lanka won by 8 wickets (D/L method)
Mahinda Rajapaksa International Stadium, Hambantota
Umpires: Nigel Llong (Eng) and Ruchira Palliyaguruge (SL)
Player of the match: Tillakaratne Dilshan (SL)

- Sri Lanka won the toss and elected to field.
- Ziaur Rahman (Bangladesh) made his ODI debut.
- Sri Lanka's innings was reduced to 41 overs with a target of 238 due to a floodlight failure.

=== 2nd ODI ===
25 March
14:30 (D/N)
Scorecard

Sri Lanka; 33/0 (5.0 overs)	v	Bangladesh
Kusal Perera 18* (21)

No result
Mahinda Rajapaksa International Stadium, Hambantota
Umpires: Nigel Llong (Eng) and Tyron Wijewardene (SL)

- Bangladesh won the toss and elected to field.
- The match was abandoned after five overs of the first innings due to rain.

=== 3rd ODI ===
28 March
14:30 (D/N)
Scorecard

Sri Lanka; 302/9 (50 overs)	v	Bangladesh; 184/7 (26 overs)
Tillakaratne Dilshan 125 (128); Abdur Razzak 5/62 (10 overs)		Anamul Haque 40 (46); Sachithra Senanayake 2/26 (6 overs)

Bangladesh won by 3 wickets (D/L)
Pallekele International Cricket Stadium, Pallekele
Umpires: Nigel Llong (Eng) and Ruchira Palliyaguruge (SL)
Player of the match: Tillakaratne Dilshan

- Sri Lanka won the toss and elected to bat.
- Bangladesh's innings was reduced to 27 overs with a target of 183 due to rain.

== T20I series ==
=== Only T20I ===
31 March
18:30 (D/N)
Scorecard

Sri Lanka; 198/5 (20 overs)	v	Bangladesh; 181/7 (20 overs)
Kusal Janith Perera 64 (44); Mahmudullah 1/28 (4 overs)		Mohammad Ashraful 43 (27); Thisara Perera 2/25 (2 overs)

Sri Lanka won by 17 runs
Pallekele International Cricket Stadium, Pallekele
Umpires: Ranmore Martinesz (SL) and Ruchira Palliyaguruge (SL)
Player of the match: Kushal Janith Perera (SL)

- Bangladesh won the toss and elected to field.
- Shamsur Rahman (Bangladesh) and Angelo Perera (Sri Lanka) made their T20I debuts.
