= Saligrah Khushiali =

Islamic festival

Saligrah Khushiali or Salgirah Khushiali is a celebration of the birthday of present (Hazar) Imam (currently Aga Khan V) on October 12 held by Nizari Ismaili Shiʿi Muslims.

The first word of the term comes from Persian: سال (sâl 'year') and Persian: گره (gereh 'knot'); 'thus salgirah refers to an anniversary added on to a string kept for the purpose'. Borrowed from Persian into Urdu and Hindi, the word means 'anniversary'. The second word comes from Persian: خوشحالی (xošhâli 'happiness').
