= Khushal, Gilan =

Khushal خوشل
- Village
- Location within Iran
- Coordinates: 37°09′40″N 49°51′49″E
- Country: Iran
- Province: Gilan
- County: Siahkal
- Bakhsh: Central
- Rural District: Malfejan

Population (2006)
  - Total: 160
- Time zone: UTC+3:30 (IRST)

Khushal (Persian: خوشل, also romanized as Khūshal) is a village in Malfejan Rural District, in the Central District of Siahkal County, Gilan Province, Iran. As of the 2016 census, its population was 143, in 48 families. Down from 160 people in 2006.
