= 2018–19 Premier League Tournament =

Cricket tournament

- Dates: 30 November 2018 – 10 February 2019
- Administrator: Sri Lanka Cricket
- Cricket format: First-class cricket
- Tournament format: Round-robin then knockout
- Host: Sri Lanka
- Champions: Colombo Cricket Club (6th title)
- Participants: 14
- Most runs: Oshada Fernando (1,181)
- Most wickets: Malinda Pushpakumara (63)

The 2018–19 Premier League Tournament was the 31st season of first-class cricket in Sri Lanka's Premier Trophy. The tournament started on 30 November 2018 and concluded on 10 February 2019. Fourteen teams took part in Tier A of the competition, split into two groups of seven. Bloomfield Cricket and Athletic Club finished in last place in the previous tournament, and were relegated to Tier B for this season. Negombo Cricket Club replaced them for this years' competition after they won the 2017–18 Premier League Tournament Tier B title. Chilaw Marians Cricket Club were the defending champions.

In January 2019, during the round six match between Colombo Cricket Club and Saracens Sports Club, Colombo's Malinda Pushpakumara took all ten wickets in the second innings of the match. Pushpakumara became the second Sri Lankan bowler to take all ten wickets in an innings. It was also the first ten-wicket haul in an innings in first-class cricket since 2009, and the best figures since 1995.

Following the conclusion of the group stage, Chilaw Marians Cricket Club, Colombo Cricket Club, Colts Cricket Club, Nondescripts Cricket Club, Saracens Sports Club, Sinhalese Sports Club, Sri Lanka Army Sports Club and Tamil Union Cricket and Athletic Club had all progressed to the Super Eight section of the tournament. Meanwhile, Badureliya Sports Club, Burgher Recreation Club, Moors Sports Club, Negombo Cricket Club, Ragama Cricket Club and Sri Lanka Ports Authority Cricket Club were all moved to the Plate League phase, with the bottom team being relegated for the next season.

In the penultimate round of the Super Eight fixtures, Nondescripts captain Angelo Perera scored a double-century in each innings. This had only been done once before in first-class cricket, by Arthur Fagg for Kent against Essex in the 1938 County Championship in England.

Colombo Cricket Club won the tournament, after finishing top of the Super Eight table, ahead of Saracens Sports Club. In the Plate League, Sri Lanka Ports Authority Cricket Club lost their final match, against Burgher Recreation Club, therefore being relegated to Tier B.

== Teams ==
The following teams competed:

Group A

- Chilaw Marians Cricket Club
- Moors Sports Club
- Nondescripts Cricket Club
- Ragama Cricket Club
- Sri Lanka Army Sports Club
- Sri Lanka Ports Authority Cricket Club
- Tamil Union Cricket and Athletic Club

Group B

- Badureliya Sports Club
- Burgher Recreation Club
- Colombo Cricket Club
- Colts Cricket Club
- Negombo Cricket Club
- Saracens Sports Club
- Sinhalese Sports Club

== Points table ==
Group A

Team	Pld	W	L	D	T	Pts
Nondescripts Cricket Club	6	2	0	4	0	78.96
Chilaw Marians Cricket Club	6	2	0	4	0	70.18
Tamil Union Cricket and Athletic Club	6	0	0	6	0	65.23
Sri Lanka Army Sports Club	6	1	0	5	0	50.67
Ragama Cricket Club	6	0	0	6	0	40.45
Sri Lanka Ports Authority Cricket Club	6	2	0	4	0	32.18
Moors Sports Club	6	3	0	3	0	30.92

Team qualified for the Super Eight

Group B

Team	Pld	W	L	D	T	Pts
Colombo Cricket Club	6	3	1	2	0	85.92
Sinhalese Sports Club	6	3	0	3	0	82.44
Saracens Sports Club	6	1	1	4	0	51.68
Colts Cricket Club	6	0	1	5	0	48.94
Badureliya Sports Club	6	0	0	6	0	38.07
Burgher Recreation Club	6	0	2	4	0	32.73
Negombo Cricket Club	6	0	2	4	0	30.63

Team qualified for the Super Eight

Super Eight

Team	Pld	W	L	D	T	Pts
Colombo Cricket Club	7	4	2	1	0	88.32
Saracens Sports Club	7	1	1	5	0	75.20
Chilaw Marians Cricket Club	7	2	0	5	0	74.52
Colts Cricket Club	7	2	1	4	0	74.45
Sinhalese Sports Club	7	2	2	3	0	72.87
Tamil Union Cricket and Athletic Club	7	1	0	6	0	70.38
Nondescripts Cricket Club	7	0	3	4	0	61.31
Sri Lanka Army Sports Club	7	0	3	4	0	28.61

Champions

Plate League

Team	Pld	W	L	D	T	Pts
Burgher Recreation Club	5	1	0	4	0	53.11
Ragama Cricket Club	5	0	0	5	0	45.24
Badureliya Sports Club	5	0	0	5	0	44.47
Moors Sports Club	5	0	0	5	0	35.92
Negombo Cricket Club	5	0	0	5	0	35.83
Sri Lanka Ports Authority Cricket Club	5	0	1	4	0	26.62

Relegated to Tier B

== Group stage ==
=== Group A ===
==== Round 1 ====
30 November–2 December 2018
Scorecard

Chilaw Marians Cricket Club	v	Tamil Union Cricket and Athletic Club
215 (56.5 overs); Harsha Cooray 68 (126); Ramith Rambukwella 5/54 (20 overs)		390 (106.4 overs); Sachithra Serasinghe 112 (206); Nimesh Vimukthi 4/61 (21.4 overs)
251/8 (74 overs); Harsha Cooray 39 (37); Ramith Rambukwella 3/58 (19 overs)

Match drawn
FTZ Sports Complex, Katunayake
Umpires: Krishantha Rodrigo and Prageeth Rambukwella

- Chilaw Marians Cricket Club won the toss and elected to bat.
- Kamindu Mendis (Tamil Union Cricket and Athletic Club) made his first-class debut.

30 November–2 December 2018
Scorecard

Moors Sports Club	v	Sri Lanka Ports Authority Cricket Club
320 (91.5 overs); Chamara Silva 87 (92); Chaminda Bandara 4/82 (22.5 overs)		156 (67.3 overs); Adeesha Nanayakkara 30 (44); Tharindu Kaushal 4/40 (19.3 overs)
		165/4 (68) (f/o); Yohan de Silva 59 (143); Malith de Silva 2/52 (16 overs)

Match drawn
R Premadasa Stadium, Colombo
Umpires: Kamal Indrajith and Deepal Gunawardene

- Sri Lanka Ports Authority Cricket Club won the toss and elected to field.

30 November–2 December 2018
Scorecard

Nondescripts Cricket Club	v	Ragama Cricket Club
272 (73.3 overs); Angelo Perera 123 (154); Ishan Jayaratne 4/73 (23 overs)		377 (114 overs); Ishan Jayaratne 99 (144); Sachintha Peiris 4/96 (32 overs)
137/6 (37 overs); Hasitha Boyagoda 51 (98); Amila Aponso 4/48 (15 overs)

Match drawn
Nondescripts Cricket Club Ground, Colombo
Umpires: Kapil Kottahachchi and Pradeep Udawatta

- Nondescripts Cricket Club won the toss and elected to bat.
- Hasitha Boyagoda (Nondescripts Cricket Club) made his first-class debut.

==== Round 2 ====
7–9 December 2018
Scorecard

Sri Lanka Army Sports Club	v	Sri Lanka Ports Authority Cricket Club
462/9d (127.2 overs); Dushan Vimukthi 178 (339); Chaminda Bandara 4/112 (30 overs)		133 (53 overs); Primosh Perera 28 (60); Dushan Vimukthi 4/18 (15 overs)
		279/4 (84 overs) (f/o); Primosh Perera 93 (1911); Dushan Vimukthi 3/59 (26 overs)

Match drawn
Army Ground, Panagoda
Umpires: Kapil Kottahachchi and Prageeth Rambukwella

- Sri Lanka Ports Authority Cricket Club won the toss and elected to field.
- Buddika Madushanka (Sri Lanka Army Sports Club) made his first-class debut.

7–9 December 2018
Scorecard

Nondescripts Cricket Club	v	Tamil Union Cricket and Athletic Club
296 (83.2 overs); Angelo Perera 124 (171); Sachithra Serasinghe 3/64 (25 overs)		184 (68.5 overs); Lahiru Milantha 35 (67); Sachintha Peiris 5/74 (20.5 overs)
221/3d (54 overs); Upul Tharanga 59* (62); Sachithra Serasinghe 1/34 (8 overs)		219/4 (47 overs); Lahiru Milantha 76 (81); Saranga Rajaguru 2/64 (10 overs)

Match drawn
P Sara Oval, Colombo
Umpires: Rohitha Kottahachchi and Keerthi Bandara

- Nondescripts Cricket Club won the toss and elected to bat.
- Sadish Pathiranage (Tamil Union Cricket and Athletic Club) made his first-class debut.

7–9 December 2018
Scorecard

Chilaw Marians Cricket Club	v	Ragama Cricket Club
281 (60.2 overs); Oshada Fernando 100 (123); Amila Aponso 5/86 (23 overs)		246 (79.1 overs); Saminda Fernando 40 (82); Nimesh Vimukthi 6/79 (34 overs)
377 (86.3 overs); Thikshila de Silva 85 (104); Amila Aponso 8/148 (39 overs)		172/4 (39 overs); Sanjaya Chathuranga 99 (115); Nimesh Vimukthi 2/44 (14 overs)

Match drawn
FTZ Sports Complex, Katunayake
Umpires: Gamini Dissanayake and Pradeep Udawatta

- Chilaw Marians Cricket Club won the toss and elected to bat.

==== Round 3 ====
14–16 December 2018
Scorecard

Moors Sports Club	v	Ragama Cricket Club
337 (84.2 overs); Charitha Kumarasinghe 103 (111); Amila Aponso 3/117 (35 overs)		497/9d (125.1 overs); Ishan Jayaratne 123 (150); Malith de Silva 4/171 (35 overs)
269/5 (52 overs); Irosh Samarasooriya 87 (119); Amila Aponso 2/59 (13 overs)

Match drawn
Moors Sports Club Ground, Colombo
Umpires: Hemantha Boteju and Keerthi Bandara

- Ragama Cricket Club won the toss and elected to field.
- Kalhara Senarathne (Ragama Cricket Club) made his first-class debut.

14–16 December 2018
Scorecard

Sri Lanka Army Sports Club	v	Tamil Union Cricket and Athletic Club
386 (128 overs); Sanjika Ridma 64 (97); Lahiru Milantha 4/33 (23 overs)		481/4d (115.5 overs); Tharanga Paranavitana 124* (196); Lakshan Madushanka 2/112 (22 overs)
66/3 (22 overs); Dilshan de Soysa 23* (46); Bobby Fernando 3/17 (5 overs)

Match drawn
P Sara Oval, Colombo
Umpires: Pradeep Udawatta and Chaminda Hathurusingha

- Tamil Union Cricket and Athletic Club won the toss and elected to field.

14–16 December 2018
Scorecard

Nondescripts Cricket Club	v	Chilaw Marians Cricket Club
321 (86.4 overs); Pathum Nissanka 74 (129); Sagar Paresh 4/74 (27 overs)		193 (62.5 overs); Harsha Cooray 48 (66); Dilesh Gunaratne 5/52 (17.5 overs)
241/5d (42 overs); Lahiru Udara 85 (86); HRC Dilshan 2/48 (8 overs)		315/9 (68 overs); Nimesh Vimukthi 79* (109); Chaturanga de Silva 5/95 (26 overs)

Match drawn
Nondescripts Cricket Club Ground, Colombo
Umpires: Ravindra Kottahachchi and Nilan De Silva

- Chilaw Marians Cricket Club won the toss and elected to field.
- Sagar Udeshi (Chilaw Marians Cricket Club) made his first-class debut.

==== Round 4 ====
20–22 December 2018
Scorecard

Nondescripts Cricket Club	v	Sri Lanka Army Sports Club
500/5d (96.2 overs); Pathum Nissanka 206* (247); Malka Madusanka 2/116 (24 overs)		385 (142 overs); Lakshan Edirisinghe 84 (182); Chaturanga de Silva 4/50 (28 overs)
229/4 (33 overs); Lahiru Udara 99 (81); Yasoda Mendis 2/74 (10 overs)

Match drawn
Nondescripts Cricket Club Ground, Colombo
Umpires: Kamal Indrajith and Hemantha Boteju

- Nondescripts Cricket Club won the toss and elected to bat.

21–23 December 2018
Scorecard

Sri Lanka Ports Authority Cricket Club	v	Ragama Cricket Club
427/9d (138 overs); Ramesh Nimantha 120 (237); Nishan Peiris 4/137 (38 overs)		291 (78.5 overs); Dineth Thimodya 104 (139); Chanaka Komasaru 4/90 (29 overs)
202/5d (48.5 overs); Ramesh Nimantha 60 (116); Nishan Peiris 3/83 (19.5 overs)		11/1 (1.4 overs); Dineth Thimodya 6 (7); Imesh Udayanga 1/6 (0.4 overs)

Match drawn
Moors Sports Club Ground, Colombo
Umpires: Rohitha Kottahachchi and Prageeth Rambukwella

- Sri Lanka Ports Authority Cricket Club won the toss and elected to bat.

21–23 December 2018
Scorecard

Chilaw Marians Cricket Club	v	Moors Sports Club
428 (98.2 overs); Oshada Fernando 147 (162); Tharindu Kaushal 5/118 (35.2 overs)		207 (76.2 overs); Pabasara Waduge 72 (126); Sagar Paresh 6/87 (36.2 overs)
		126 (43 overs) (f/o); Ramesh Mendis 54 (69); Nimesh Vimukthi 6/46 (17 overs)

Chilaw Marians Cricket Club won by an innings and 95 runs
FTZ Sports Complex, Katunayake
Umpires: Deepal Gunawardene and Pradeep Udawatta

- Chilaw Marians Cricket Club won the toss and elected to bat.
- PJ Rakesh (Chilaw Marians Cricket Club) made his first-class debut.

==== Round 5 ====
28–30 December 2018
Scorecard

Sri Lanka Ports Authority Cricket Club	v	Tamil Union Cricket and Athletic Club
245 (82 overs); Ruvindu Gunasekera 66 (94); Jeevan Mendis 9/53 (29 overs)		416 (105.5 overs); Jeevan Mendis 106 (141); Imesh Udayanga 6/147 (39 overs)
296/8 (76 overs); Adeesha Nanayakkara 137 (169); Jeevan Mendis 3/106 (23 overs)

Match drawn
P Sara Oval, Colombo
Umpires: Gamini Dissanayake and Kapil Kottahachchi

- Sri Lanka Ports Authority Cricket Club won the toss and elected to bat.
- Jeevan Mendis (Tamil Union Cricket and Athletic Club) took the best bowling figures in 2018 in a first-class cricket match.

28–30 December 2018
Scorecard

Nondescripts Cricket Club	v	Moors Sports Club
330 (65.5 overs); Pathum Nissanka 163 (182); Tharindu Kaushal 4/72 (14.5 overs)		81 (24.3 overs); Irosh Samarasooriya 26 (44); Chaturanga de Silva 6/32 (9.3 overs)
367/7d (59 overs); Hasitha Boyagoda 101 (146); Ramesh Mendis 4/92 (14 overs)		73 (21.1 overs); Irosh Samarasooriya 22 (53); Sachintha Peiris 6/45 (11 overs)

Nondescripts Cricket Club won by 543 runs
Moors Sports Club Ground, Colombo
Umpires: Palitha de Alwis and Ruchira Palliyaguruge

- Nondescripts Cricket Club won the toss and elected to bat.
- Irshad Umar (Moors Sports Club) made his first class debut.

28–30 December 2018
Scorecard

Sri Lanka Army Sports Club	v	Chilaw Marians Cricket Club
357 (124.4 overs); Sanjika Ridma 119 (213); Thikshila de Silva 3/95 (29 overs)		482/9d (130 overs); Oshada Fernando 140 (219); Lakshan Madushanka 3/98 (20 overs)

Match drawn
Army Ground, Panagoda
Umpires: Rohitha Kottahachchi and Asanga Jayasooriya

- Sri Lanka Army Sports Club won the toss and elected to bat.
- Thulina Dilshan and Agith Rajapaksha (Sri Lanka Army Sports Club) both made their first-class debuts.

==== Round 6 ====
4–6 January 2019
Scorecard

Moors Sports Club	v	Sri Lanka Army Sports Club
110 (44.4 overs); Adeesha Thilanchana 35 (62); Dushan Vimukthi 5/35 (19 overs)		221 (80.1 overs); Dushan Vimukthi 35 (92); Keshan Wijerathne 3/40 (14 overs)
280 (67.3 overs); Irosh Samarasooriya 109 (206); Danusika Bandara 5/87 (24.3 overs)		171/5 (52.3 overs); Dilshan de Soysa 41* (83); Ramesh Mendis 3/47 (14.3 overs)

Sri Lanka Army Sports Club won by 5 wickets
Moors Sports Club Ground, Colombo
Umpires: Pradeep Udawatta and Nilan De Silva

- Moors Sports Club won the toss and elected to bat.
- Lahiru Attanayake (Moors Sports Club) made his first-class debut.

4–6 January 2019
Scorecard

Sri Lanka Ports Authority Cricket Club	v	Chilaw Marians Cricket Club
233 (68.5 overs); Yohan de Silva 64 (118); Sagar Paresh 6/70 (24.5 overs)		203 (60.2 overs); Risith Upamal 54 (80); Anuk de Alwis 4/53 (16 overs)
179 (67.1 overs); Adeesha Nanayakkara 64 (98); Nimesh Vimukthi 3/68 (19 overs)		210/9 (61.1 overs); Irosh Fernando 65* (118); Chanaka Komasaru 5/74 (25 overs)

Chilaw Marians Cricket Club won by 1 wicket
FTZ Sports Complex, Katunayake
Umpires: Kapil Kottahachchi and Ranganath Prasanna

- Sri Lanka Ports Authority Cricket Club won the toss and elected to bat.

4–6 January 2019
Scorecard

Ragama Cricket Club	v	Tamil Union Cricket and Athletic Club
433 (118.2 overs); Supeshala Jayathilake 100 (188); Jeevan Mendis 4/125 (39.2 overs)		544/8d (131.2 overs); Tharanga Paranavitana 184 (331); Chathura Peiris 4/82 (23 overs)
55/2 (15 overs); Dineth Thimodya 22 (28); Dinuk Wikramanayaka 1/9 (2 overs)

Match drawn
Nondescripts Cricket Club Ground, Colombo
Umpires: Nilantha Semasinghe and Lyndon Hannibal

- Tamil Union Cricket and Athletic Club won the toss and elected to field.

==== Round 7 ====
11–13 January 2019
Scorecard

Moors Sports Club	v	Tamil Union Cricket and Athletic Club
326 (95.3 overs); Ramesh Mendis 76 (163); Jeevan Mendis 5/121 (39 overs)		361 (95.5 overs); Sachithra Serasinghe 160 (191); Ramesh Mendis 5/124 (34.5 overs)
329/6 (63 overs); Chamara Silva 105 (85); Shehan Madushanka 2/26 (7 overs)

Match drawn
Moors Sports Club Ground, Colombo
Umpires: Kamal Indrajith and Gamini Dissanayake

- Moors Sports Club won the toss and elected to bat.
- Avindu Theekshana and Asitha Gihan (Tamil Union Cricket and Athletic Club) both made their first-class debuts.

11–13 January 2019
Scorecard

Nondescripts Cricket Club	v	Sri Lanka Ports Authority Cricket Club
218 (59.1 overs); Malinga Amarasinghe 54 (94); Chaminda Bandara 3/55 (10.1 overs)		230 (74.5 overs); Primosh Perera 76 (154); Chaturanga de Silva 4/99 (29 overs)
365/5d (72 overs); Chaturanga de Silva 100 (109); Chanaka Komasaru 2/94 (20 overs)		95 (23.5 overs); Imesh Udayanga 22 (30); Sachintha Peiris 5/49 (11.5 overs)

Nondescripts Cricket Club won by 258 runs
Nondescripts Cricket Club Ground, Colombo
Umpires: Asanga Jayasooriya and Deepal Gunawardene

- Nondescripts Cricket Club won the toss and elected to bat.
- Samitha Ranga (Nondescripts Cricket Club) made his first-class debut.

11–13 January 2019
Scorecard

Sri Lanka Army Sports Club	v	Ragama Cricket Club
284 (109.2 overs); Dushan Vimukthi 62 (156); Sanjika Ridma 62 (156); Amila Aponso 4/75 (31.2 overs)		226 (88.3 overs); Supeshala Jayathilake 57 (74); Janith Silva 4/44 (21.3 overs)
281/7 (66 overs); Himasha Liyanage 88 (145); Shehan Fernando 2/21 (4 overs)

Match drawn
Army Ground, Panagoda
Umpires: Raveendra Wimalasiri and Susantha Dissanayake

- Sri Lanka Army Sports Club won the toss and elected to bat.

=== Group B ===
==== Round 1 ====
30 November–2 December 2018
Scorecard

Sinhalese Sports Club	v	Colombo Cricket Club
229 (63 overs); Kaushal Silva 41 (66); Lakshan Sandakan 6/58 (20 overs)		225 (83 overs); Lasith Abeyratne 92 (145); Tharindu Ratnayake 7/75 (33 overs)
245 (53.1 overs); Shammu Ashan 65 (73); Ashan Priyanjan 4/67 (16 overs)		137 (40.5 overs); Sonal Dinusha 59 (109); Tharindu Ratnayake 7/50 (15.5 overs)

Sinhalese Sports Club won by 112 runs
Sinhalese Sports Club Ground, Colombo
Umpires: Gamini Dissanayake and Raveendra Wimalasiri

- Sinhalese Sports Club won the toss and elected to bat.
- Sonal Dinusha (Colombo Cricket Club) made his first-class debut.

30 November–2 December 2018
Scorecard

Badureliya Sports Club	v	Burgher Recreation Club
258 (84 overs); Subramanian Anand 65 (90); Mohamed Shiraz 5/44 (23 overs)		449/6d (109.3 overs); Pravinath Wijesooriya 123* (92); Sachith Pathirana 3/143 (35 overs)
164/9 (73 overs); Nadeera Nawela 76 (153); Tillakaratne Sampath 3/39 (19 overs)

Match drawn
Surrey Village, Maggona
Umpires: Ravindra Kottahachchi and Asanga Jayasooriya

- Burgher Recreation Club won the toss and elected to field.

30 November–2 December 2018
Scorecard

Saracens Sports Club	v	Colts Cricket Club
316 (108.2 overs); Ashen Bandara 106 (291); Kavishka Anjula 3/68 (18 overs)		224 (72 overs); Sadeera Samarawickrama 64 (121); Chamikara Edirisinghe 3/44 (17 overs)
145/7d (48 overs); Nipun Karunanayake 57 (119); Nisala Tharaka 3/25 (14 overs)		56/3 (11 overs); Nisala Tharaka 25* (25); Mohomed Dilshad 2/6 (2 overs)

Match drawn
Colts Cricket Club Ground, Colombo
Umpires: Hemantha Boteju and Keerthi Bandara

- Colts Cricket Club won the toss and elected to field.
- Jehan Daniel (Colts Cricket Club) made his first-class debut.

==== Round 2 ====
7–9 December 2018
Scorecard

Saracens Sports Club	v	Sinhalese Sports Club
293 (88.1 overs); Gamindu Kanishka 95 (155); Tharindu Ratnayake 3/57 (18.1 overs)		419/8d (125.2 overs); Kaushal Silva 127 (203); Chamikara Edirisinghe 4/119 (44.2 overs)
169/6 (52.4 overs); Ashen Bandara 48 (53); Tharindu Ratnayake 2/46 (12.4 overs)

Match drawn
Sinhalese Sports Club Ground, Colombo
Umpires: Deepal Gunawardene and Nilan De Silva

- Sinhalese Sports Club won the toss and elected to field.
- Pasindu Sooriyabandara (Sinhalese Sports Club) made his first-class debut.

7–9 December 2018
Scorecard

Burgher Recreation Club	v	Negombo Cricket Club
221 (72.4 overs); Hashen Ramanayake 66 (124); Shehan Jayasuriya 4/56 (17.4 overs)		258 (86.4 overs); Lasith Croospulle 79 (97); Mohamed Shiraz 6/86 (21.4 overs)
276d (53.5 overs); Deshan Dias 119 (130); Sahan Adeesha 2/63 (12 overs)		142/2 (37 overs); Lasith Croospulle 85 (107); Hashen Ramanayake 2/33 (9 overs)

Match drawn
Burgher Recreation Club Ground, Colombo
Umpires: Hemantha Boteju and Asanga Jayasooriya

- Burgher Recreation Club won the toss and elected to bat.

7–9 December 2018
Scorecard

Colts Cricket Club	v	Colombo Cricket Club
225 (87.3 overs); Vishad Randika 68 (143); Malinda Pushpakumara 6/86 (34 overs)		367 (87 overs); Ashan Priyanjan 161* (212); Kavishka Anjula 3/28 (6 overs)
123 (43 overs); Sangeeth Cooray 37 (98); Malinda Pushpakumara 5/53 (16 overs)

Colombo Cricket Club won by an innings and 19 runs
Colts Cricket Club Ground, Colombo
Umpires: Ravindra Kottahachchi and Ranganath Prasanna

- Colts Cricket Club won the toss and elected to bat.
- Maheesh Theekshana and Dhananjaya Lakshan (Colts Cricket Club) both made their first-class debuts.

==== Round 3 ====
14–16 December 2018
Scorecard

Colts Cricket Club	v	Sinhalese Sports Club
365 (108.1 overs); Sangeeth Cooray 119 (226); Sachithra Senanayake 7/88 (28.1 overs)		285 (81.2 overs); Chamara Kapugedera 69 (109); Maheesh Theekshana 5/76 (20 overs)
300/8 (68 overs); Vishad Randika 104* (110); Sachithra Senanayake 3/55 (15 overs)

Match drawn
Sinhalese Sports Club Ground, Colombo
Umpires: Asanga Jayasooriya and Prageeth Rambukwella

- Sinhalese Sports Club won the toss and elected to field.
- Nipun Dananjaya (Sinhalese Sports Club) and Rohan Sanjaya (Colts Cricket Club) both made their first-class debuts.

14–16 December 2018
Scorecard

Colombo Cricket Club	v	Negombo Cricket Club
383 (100.3 overs); Minod Bhanuka 88 (145); Roshen Fernando 4/66 (22 overs)		316 (153 overs); Ashen Silva 109 (266); Malinda Pushpakumara 5/90 (60 overs)
66/1 (10 overs); Sonal Dinusha 29 (36); Dilan Jayalath 1/6 (1 over)

Match drawn
Colombo Cricket Club Ground, Colombo
Umpires: Kapil Kottahachchi and Deepal Gunawardene

- Negombo won the toss and elected to field.

16–18 December 2018
Scorecard

Saracens Sports Club	v	Badureliya Sports Club
428/9d (147.1 overs); Milinda Siriwardana 175 (253); Buddika Sanjeewa 3/97 (34 overs)		186 (79.2 overs); Subramanian Anand 58 (110); Gamindu Kanishka 4/16 (10.2 overs)
		215/5 (48) (f/o); Sachith Pathirana 77* (34); Chamikara Edirisinghe 4/84 (21 overs)

Match drawn
Surrey Village, Maggona
Umpires: Rohitha Kottahachchi and Vidura Prasad

- Saracens Sports Club won the toss and elected to bat.

==== Round 4 ====
21–23 December 2018
Scorecard

Badureliya Sports Club	v	Sinhalese Sports Club
372 (95.5 overs); Subramanian Anand 127 (141); Sachithra Senanayake 5/94 (26 overs)		429 (101.4 overs); Akash Senaratne 90 (117); Sachith Pathirana 4/146 (37.4 overs)
222/4 (49 overs); Salinda Ushan 79 (117); Shammu Ashan 1/10 (3 overs)

Match drawn
Sinhalese Sports Club Ground, Colombo
Umpires: Ranmore Martinesz and S B Semasinghe

- Sinhalese Sports Club won the toss and elected to field.

21–23 December 2018
Scorecard

Burgher Recreation Club	v	Saracens Sports Club
453/8d (104.4 overs); Rumesh Buddika 119 (139); Chamikara Edirisinghe 2/71 (23 overs)		440/9 (154 overs); Milinda Siriwardana 102 (191); Mohamed Shiraz 4/145 (37)

Match drawn
Burgher Recreation Club Ground, Colombo
Umpires: Gamini Dissanayake and Raveendra Wimalasiri

- Saracens Sports Club won the toss and elected to field.

21–23 December 2018
Scorecard

Colts Cricket Club	v	Negombo Cricket Club
243 (69.4 overs); Avishka Fernando 101 (144); Upul Indrasiri 4/85 (27.4 overs)		230 (76.1 overs); Dilasri Lokubandara 57 (99); Rohan Sanjaya 5/80 (24 overs)
275/6d (72 overs); Sangeeth Cooray 112* (223); Shehan Jayasuriya 3/78 (26 overs)		168/7 (29 overs); Shehan Jayasuriya 45 (22); Nisala Tharaka 3/35 (9 overs)

Match drawn
Colts Cricket Club Ground, Colombo
Umpires: Ravindra Kottahachchi and Dilshan de Silva

- Negombo Cricket Club won the toss and elected to field.

==== Round 5 ====
28–30 December 2018
Scorecard

Negombo Cricket Club	v	Sinhalese Sports Club
212 (62.3 overs); Sanitha de Mel 43 (72); Vimukthi Perera 3/33 (11 overs)		446/9d (113.2 overs); Kaushal Silva 210 (313); Nilanka Sandakan 4/126 (29 overs)
188 (44.1 overs); Lasith Croospulle 87 (65); Akash Senaratne 3/68 (14 overs)

Sinhalese Sports Club won by an innings and 46 runs
Sinhalese Sports Club Ground, Colombo
Umpires: Suranga Perera and Lyndon Hannibal

- Negombo Cricket Club won the toss and elected to bat.

28–30 December 2018
Scorecard

Burgher Recreation Club	v	Colombo Cricket Club
105 (43.4 overs); Hashen Ramanayake 24 (16); Vishwa Fernando 4/52 (9.4 overs)		498/7d (119 overs); Minod Bhanuka 180 (289); Hashen Ramanayake 2/47 (15 overs)
275 (79.2 overs); Rumesh Buddika 83 (149); Malinda Pushpakumara 5/82 (24 overs)

Colombo Cricket Club won by an innings and 118 runs
Colombo Cricket Club Ground, Colombo
Umpires: Ravindra Kottahachchi and Nilan De Silva

- Colombo Cricket Club won the toss and elected to field.

28–30 December 2018
Scorecard

Colts Cricket Club	v	Badureliya Sports Club
419/9d (150 overs); Priyamal Perera 206* (481); Buddika Sanjeewa 5/86 (40 overs)		420/9d (120 overs); Lahiru Samarakoon 71* (86); Nisala Tharaka 4/90 (26 overs)

Match drawn
Colts Cricket Club Ground, Colombo
Umpires: Maurice Zilva and Pradeep Udawatta

- Badureliya Sports Club won the toss and elected to field.

==== Round 6 ====
4–6 January 2019
Scorecard

Sinhalese Sports Club	v	Burgher Recreation Club
289 (66.4 overs); Shammu Ashan 125 (168); Duvindu Tillakaratne 5/65 (19.4 overs)		267 (79 overs); Rumesh Buddika 105* (137); Tharindu Ratnayake 5/83 (31 overs)
198 (50.1 overs); Kaushal Silva 79 (144); Duvindu Tillakaratne 5/56 (20.1 overs)		186 (50.4 overs); Rumesh Buddika 76 (106); Sachithra Senanayake 5/81 (23 overs)

Sinhalese Sports Club won by 34 runs
Burgher Recreation Club Ground, Colombo
Umpires: Asanga Jayasooriya and Raveendra Wimalasiri

- Sinhalese Sports Club won the toss and elected to bat.

4–6 January 2019
Scorecard

Colombo Cricket Club	v	Saracens Sports Club
238 (62 overs); Madawa Warnapura 63 (94); Chamikara Edirisinghe 9/87 (26 overs)		169 (64.4 overs); Chamikara Edirisinghe 53 (121); Malinda Pushpakumara 6/73 (29 overs)
279/5d (72.3 overs); Ron Chandraguptha 93 (196); Ranitha Liyanarachchi 2/39 (11 overs)		113 (36.4 overs); Ashen Bandara 22 (47); Malinda Pushpakumara 10/37 (18.4 overs)

Colombo Cricket Club won by 235 runs
Colombo Cricket Club Ground, Colombo
Umpires: Gamini Dissanayake and Prageeth Rambukwella

- Colombo Cricket Club won the toss and elected to bat.

6–8 January 2019
Scorecard

Negombo Cricket Club	v	Badureliya Sports Club
328 (122.3 overs); Prasansana Jayamanne 108 (311); Buddika Sanjeewa 5/74 (37.3 overs)		333 (123.3 overs); Salinda Ushan 113 (240); Upul Indrasiri 6/120 (45.3 overs)
170/2 (20 overs); Dilasri Lokubandara 63* (50); Sachith Pathirana 1/57 (6 overs)

Match drawn
Surrey Village, Maggona
Umpires: Rohitha Kottahachchi and Vidura Prasad

- Negombo Cricket Club won the toss and elected to bat.

==== Round 7 ====
11–13 January 2019
Scorecard

Colts Cricket Club	v	Burgher Recreation Club
391 (128.5 overs); Priyamal Perera 200* (388); Tillakaratne Sampath 6/86 (32 overs)		354 (80 overs); Raminda Wijesooriya 104 (118); Akila Dananjaya 4/104 (30 overs)
194/5 (57.3 overs); Sangeeth Cooray 95 (179); Rumesh Buddika 2/41 (9.3 overs)

Match drawn
Burgher Recreation Club Ground, Colombo
Umpires: Kapil Kottahachchi and Ruchira Palliyaguruge

- Burgher Recreation Club won the toss and elected to field.
- Nishan Madushka and Praveen Jayawickrama (Colts Cricket Club) both made their first-class debuts.

11–13 January 2019
Scorecard

Negombo Cricket Club	v	Saracens Sports Club
216 (65 overs); Shehan Jayasuriya 62 (94); Chamikara Edirisinghe 4/51 (21 overs)		302 (134 overs); Nipun Karunanayake 74 (237); Upul Indrasiri 5/76 (40 overs)
138 (55.4 overs); Ashen Silva 35 (89); Hareen Buddila 5/39 (20 overs)		58/2 (6.4 overs); Gamindu Kanishka 22 (14); Roshen Fernando 1/28 (3.4 overs)

Saracens Sports Club won by 8 wickets
Surrey Village, Maggona
Umpires: Ravindra Kottahachchi and Vidura Prasad

- Negombo Cricket Club won the toss and elected to bat.

11–13 January 2019
Scorecard

Colombo Cricket Club	v	Badureliya Sports Club
378 (101 overs); Wanindu Hasaranga 82 (84); Sachith Pathirana 4/154 (44 overs)		248 (61.1 overs); Pramud Hettiwatte 59 (41); Wanindu Hasaranga 5/78 (15.1 overs)
357/9d (83 overs); Lasith Abeyratne 73* (91); Tatenda Taibu 3/24 (8 overs)		63/5 (17 overs); Denuwan Rajakaruna 17 (32); Ron Chandraguptha 2/1 (1 over)

Match drawn
Tyronne Fernando Stadium, Moratuwa
Umpires: Krishantha Rodrigo and Hemantha Boteju

- Colombo Cricket Club won the toss and elected to bat.

== Plate League ==
18–20 January 2019
Scorecard

Negombo Cricket Club	v	Ragama Cricket Club
474/9d (130.2 overs); Lasith Croospulle 157 (205); Sanjaya Chathuranga 4/38 (9.2 overs)		397/8 (138 overs); Sanjaya Chathuranga 112* (202); Roshen Fernando 4/69 (30 overs)

Match drawn
FTZ Sports Complex, Katunayake
Umpires: Chaminda Hathurusingha and Dilshan de Silva

- Ragama Cricket Club won the toss and elected to field.
- Santhush Gunathilake (Ragama Cricket Club) made his first-class debut.

18–20 January 2019
Scorecard

Badureliya Sports Club	v	Sri Lanka Ports Authority Cricket Club
473/9d (117.3 overs); Denuwan Rajakaruna 117 (155); Imesh Udayanga 5/125 (26 overs)		348 (95.3 overs); Adeesha Nanayakkara 101 (147); Alankara Asanka Silva 6/83 (35.3 overs)
284/7 (51 overs); Salinda Ushan 91 (101); Chanaka Komasaru 3/81 (19 overs)

Match drawn
Colts Cricket Club Ground, Colombo
Umpires: Ranganath Prasanna and Eric Kannangara

- Sri Lanka Ports Authority Cricket Club won the toss and elected to field.

18–20 January 2019
Scorecard

Moors Sports Club	v	Burgher Recreation Club
321 (75.5 overs); Chamara Silva 81 (69); Duvindu Tillakaratne 3/41 (18.5 overs)		430 (93.4 overs); Bhanuka Rajapaksa 108 (99); Tharindu Kaushal 6/127 (27 overs)
288/8d (80 overs); Irosh Samarasooriya 87 (169); Mohamed Shiraz 3/63 (18 overs)		61/4 (11 overs); Rumesh Buddika 25 (18); Ramesh Mendis 2/21 (5 overs)

Match drawn
Bloomfield Cricket and Athletic Club Ground, Colombo
Umpires: Suranga Perera and Vidura Prasad

- Burgher Recreation Club won the toss and elected to field.

25–27 January 2019
Scorecard

Burgher Recreation Club	v	Ragama Cricket Club
291 (65.5 overs); Tillakaratne Sampath 105 (116); Kalhara Senarathne 4/63 (15.5 overs)		430/9d (141.2 overs); Sameera de Zoysa 215 (393); Tillakaratne Sampath 4/104 (44 overs)
230/8 (63.4 overs); Bhanuka Rajapaksa 84 (110); Amila Aponso 6/50 (18.4 overs)

Match drawn
Bloomfield Cricket and Athletic Club Ground, Colombo
Umpires: Kamal Indrajith and Prageeth Rambukwella

- Ragama Cricket Club won the toss and elected to field.

25–27 January 2019
Scorecard

Negombo Cricket Club	v	Sri Lanka Ports Authority Cricket Club
365 (102.1 overs); Prasansana Jayamanne 137* (296); Chanaka Komasaru 4/75 (40.1 overs)		280 (89.3 overs); Primosh Perera 70 (108); Upul Indrasiri 6/68 (29 overs)
200/2d (39.2 overs); Ashen Silva 60* (90); Hashan Vimarshana 1/45 (9 overs)		120/2 (29 overs); Primosh Perera 58* (75); Sahan Arachchige 1/7 (2 overs)

Match drawn
Moors Sports Club Ground, Colombo
Umpires: Maurice Zilva and Asanga Jayasooriya

- Negombo Cricket Club won the toss and elected to bat.

25–27 January 2019
Scorecard

Badureliya Sports Club	v	Moors Sports Club
383 (107.2 overs); Alankara Asanka Silva 144* (340); Shiran Fernando 4/88 (24.2 overs)		259 (75.5 overs); Ramesh Mendis 86 (134); Sachith Pathirana 5/116 (31.5 overs)
258/3 (80.4 overs); Alankara Asanka Silva 151 (269); Ramesh Mendis 1/56 (20 overs)

Match drawn
Burgher Recreation Club Ground, Colombo
Umpires: Gamini Dissanayake and Upul Wewage

- Moors Sports Club won the toss and elected to field.
- Alwis Nanayakkara (Moors Sports Club) made his first-class debut.

1–3 February 2019
Scorecard

Badureliya Sports Club	v	Ragama Cricket Club
277 (78.5 overs); Pathum Madusanka 76 (169); Nishan Peiris 6/88 (22.5 overs)		389 (97.3 overs); Sameera de Zoysa 150 (230); Alankara Asanka Silva 6/84 (34 overs)
295 (58.4 overs); Lahiru Samarakoon 101 (71); Nishan Peiris 8/94 (20.4 overs)		78/0 (17 overs); Shehan Fernando 53* (41)

Match drawn
Bloomfield Cricket and Athletic Club Ground, Colombo
Umpires: Nilantha Semasinghe and Susantha Dissanayake

- Badureliya Sports Club won the toss and elected to bat.

1–3 February 2019
Scorecard

Sri Lanka Ports Authority Cricket Club	v	Burgher Recreation Club
237 (79.3 overs); Yohan de Silva 137 (238); Maduka Liyanapathiranage 3/49 (25 overs)		629 (92.3 overs); Bhanuka Rajapaksa 268 (173); Chanaka Komasaru 4/124 (22 overs)
145 (28.3 overs); Imesh Udayanga 52 (53); Vikum Sanjaya 4/44 (7 overs)

Burgher Recreation Club won by 247 runs
Moors Sports Club Ground, Colombo
Umpires: Rohitha Kottahachchi and Ranjith Vishwakula

- Burgher Recreation Club won the toss and elected to field.
- Nimantha Gunasiri (Burgher Recreation Club) made his first-class debut.

1–3 February 2019
Scorecard

Negombo Cricket Club	v	Moors Sports Club
242 (91.4 overs); Prasansana Jayamanne 108 (249); Ramesh Mendis 4/52 (18 overs)		292 (95.4 overs); Anuk Fernando 100 (148); Upul Indrasiri 4/105 (39.4 overs)
180/5d (67.3 overs); Prasansana Jayamanne 90 (202); Shiran Fernando 2/21 (10 overs)		72/2 (9 overs); Ramesh Mendis 36* (15); Nilanka Sandakan 1/20 (2 overs)

Match drawn
Burgher Recreation Club Ground, Colombo
Umpires: Kapil Kottahachchi and Nilan De Silva

- Negombo Cricket Club won the toss and elected to bat.

== Super Eight ==
17–20 January 2019
Scorecard

Sri Lanka Army Sports Club	v	Colombo Cricket Club
295 (105.3 overs); Lakshan Edirisinghe 61 (101); Malinda Pushpakumara 6/107 (39.3 overs)		464 (123.5 overs); Ashan Priyanjan 180 (289); Dushan Vimukthi 6/135 (40 overs)
306 (91.2 overs); Himasha Liyanage 72 (113); Wanindu Hasaranga 3/40 (16.2 overs)		143/4 (24.3 overs); Wanindu Hasaranga 60* (31); Nuwan Liyanapathirana 2/28 (7 overs)

Colombo Cricket Club won by 6 wickets
P Sara Oval, Colombo
Umpires: Rohitha Kottahachchi and Asanga Jayasooriya

- Colombo Cricket Club won the toss and elected to field.

17–20 January 2019
Scorecard

Nondescripts Cricket Club	v	Colts Cricket Club
251 (56.1 overs); Lahiru Udara 85 (94); Akila Dananjaya 5/72 (19.1 overs)		298 (111.2 overs); Jehan Daniel 67 (130); Sachintha Peiris 8/47 (32 overs)
402/9d (108 overs); Malinga Amarasinghe 107* (168); Sangeeth Cooray 4/111 (40 overs)		356/6 (94.1 overs); Sangeeth Cooray 88 (183); Nimesha Gunasinghe 4/57 (12 overs)

Colts Cricket Club won by 4 wickets
Colombo Cricket Club Ground, Colombo
Umpires: Gamini Dissanayake and Raveendra Wimalasiri

- Nondescripts Cricket Club won the toss and elected to bat.

17–20 January 2019
Scorecard

Saracens Sports Club	v	Chilaw Marians Cricket Club
524 (165.1 overs); Promod Maduwantha 217 (367); Nimesh Vimukthi 4/92 (31 overs)		312 (87.5 overs); Yashodha Lanka 109 (146); Hareen Buddila 5/90 (23.5 overs)
		329 (98 overs) (f/o); Oshada Fernando 105 (127); Chamikara Edirisinghe 3/115 (40 overs)

Match drawn
Sinhalese Sports Club Ground, Colombo
Umpires: Nilantha Semasinghe and Nilan De Silva

- Chilaw Marians Cricket Club won the toss and elected to field.

17–20 January 2019
Scorecard

Sinhalese Sports Club	v	Tamil Union Cricket and Athletic Club
321 (86.1 overs); Kaushal Silva 65 (105); Ramith Rambukwella 5/89 (24 overs)		536 (133.3 overs); Sachithra Serasinghe 204 (261); Akash Senaratne 4/73 (15.3 overs)
304 (88.2 overs); Sandun Weerakkody 68 (71); Sachithra Serasinghe 5/48 (25 overs)		90/2 (11.3 overs); Lahiru Milantha 43 (22); Dhammika Prasad 1/23 (3 overs)

Tamil Union Cricket and Athletic Club won by 8 wickets
Nondescripts Cricket Club Ground, Colombo
Umpires: Kapil Kottahachchi and Ruchira Palliyaguruge

- Tamil Union Cricket and Athletic Club won the toss and elected to field.
- Selvarajh Mathushan (Tamil Union Cricket and Athletic Club) made his first-class debut.

24–27 January 2019
Scorecard

Chilaw Marians Cricket Club	v	Colts Cricket Club
560 (133 overs); Harsha Cooray 162* (320); Sangeeth Cooray 4/105 (27 overs)		308 (88.2 overs); Priyamal Perera 107 (195); Sagar Paresh 5/84 (35 overs)
423/5d (81.2 overs); Oshada Fernando 234 (209); Nalin Priyadarshana 2/114 (20 overs)		269/5 (52 overs); Sangeeth Cooray 121* (171); Sagar Paresh 3/94 (20 overs)

Match drawn
Nondescripts Cricket Club Ground, Colombo
Umpires: Hemantha Boteju and Rohitha Kottahachchi

- Chilaw Marians Cricket Club won the toss and elected to bat.

24–27 January 2019
Scorecard

Tamil Union Cricket and Athletic Club	v	Colombo Cricket Club
405 (127.5 overs); Tharanga Paranavitana 215* (372); Lahiru Madushanka 3/54 (19.5 overs)		324 (89.2 overs); Wanindu Hasaranga 106 (136); Rangana Herath 5/71 (30 overs)
268 (84 overs); Ramith Rambukwella 63 (60); Lahiru Gamage 3/61 (17 overs)		196/6 (44 overs); Ron Chandraguptha 53 (45); Damitha Silva 4/31 (7 overs)

Match drawn
FTZ Sports Complex, Katunayake
Umpires: Ravindra Kottahachchi and Susantha Dissanayake

- Colombo Cricket Club won the toss and elected to field.

24–27 January 2019
Scorecard

Sinhalese Sports Club	v	Sri Lanka Army Sports Club
582/9d (141.5 overs); Kaushal Silva 273 (345); Dushan Vimukthi 5/155 (36 overs)		321 (86.5 overs); Dushan Vimukthi 133 (222); Tharindu Ratnayake 5/97 (32.5 overs)
77/1 (13.2 overs); Sandun Weerakkody 49* (42); Viraj Pushpakumara 1/24 (6 overs)		335 (99.2 overs) (f/o); Lakshitha Madushan 110 (178); Tharindu Ratnayake 4/108 (27.2 overs)

Sinhalese won by 9 wickets
Colombo Cricket Club Ground, Colombo
Umpires: Deepal Gunawardene and Keerthi Bandara

- Sri Lanka Army Sports Club won the toss and elected to field.

24–27 January 2019
Scorecard

Nondescripts Cricket Club	v	Saracens Sports Club
253 (87.3 overs); Mahela Udawatte 101 (206); Chamikara Edirisinghe 4/82 (25 overs)		457 (142.3 overs); Promod Maduwantha 116 (305); Lasith Embuldeniya 6/96 (32.3 overs)
427/9d (78 overs); Lahiru Udara 127 (144); Chamikara Edirisinghe 4/103 (23 overs)		224/4 (46 overs); Ashen Bandara 94* (79); Lasith Embuldeniya 3/66 (16 overs)

Saracens won by 6 wickets
Colts Cricket Club Ground, Colombo
Umpires: Ranganath Prasanna and Ruchira Palliyaguruge

- Saracens Sports Club won the toss and elected to field.
- Manuran de Silva (Nondescripts Cricket Club) made his first-class debut.

31 January–3 February 2019
Scorecard

Chilaw Marians Cricket Club	v	Colombo Cricket Club
186 (48.2 overs); Oshada Fernando 52 (69); Lahiru Madushanka 6/51 (12.2 overs)		206 (60.3 overs); Lahiru Madushanka 51* (92); Sagar Paresh 5/38 (24 overs)
290 (83.2 overs); Yashodha Lanka 89 (95); Ashan Priyanjan 2/36 (13 overs)		256 (68.4 overs); Wanindu Hasaranga 77 (100); Sagar Paresh 6/110 (33.4 overs)

Chilaw Marians Cricket Club won by 14 runs
Colts Cricket Club Ground, Colombo
Umpires: Lyndon Hannibal and Pradeep Udawatta

- Colombo Cricket Club won the toss and elected to field.
- Yuran Nimasha (Colombo Cricket Club) made his first-class debut.

31 January–3 February 2019
Scorecard

Colts Cricket Club	v	Tamil Union Cricket and Athletic Club
615 (154.2 overs); Avishka Fernando 223 (212); Jeevan Mendis 4/192 (49.2 overs)		315 (84.1 overs); Jeevan Mendis 105 (132); Praveen Jayawickrama 3/35 (8.1 overs)
251/8d (51 overs); Sangeeth Cooray 90* (133); Kamindu Mendis 3/48 (10 overs)		331/8 (64 overs); Manoj Sarathchandra 103 (145); Nalin Priyadarshana 4/95 (18 overs)

Match drawn
Sinhalese Sports Club Ground, Colombo
Umpires: Asanga Jayasooriya and Deepal Gunawardene

- Tamil Union Cricket and Athletic Club won the toss and elected to field.

31 January–3 February 2019
Scorecard

Sri Lanka Army Sports Club	v	Saracens Sports Club
350 (98.5 overs); Himasha Liyanage 116 (162); Sachithra Perera 3/42 (16 overs)		516 (155.1 overs); Gamindu Kanishka 141 (245); Dushan Vimukthi 4/137 (53.1 overs)
456/9 (102.1 overs); Dushan Vimukthi 128 (206); Chamikara Edirisinghe 4/176 (41 overs)

Match drawn
FTZ Sports Complex, Katunayake
Umpires: Hemantha Boteju and Prageeth Rambukwella

- Sri Lanka Army Sports Club won the toss and elected to bat.

31 January–3 February 2019
Scorecard

Nondescripts Cricket Club	v	Sinhalese Sports Club
444 (103.3 overs); Angelo Perera 201 (203); Dhammika Prasad 3/86 (19 overs)		480 (129 overs); Sandun Weerakkody 189 (224); Lasith Embuldeniya 4/86 (34 overs)
579/6 (112 overs); Angelo Perera 231 (268); Chathupama Gunasinghe 2/42 (12 overs)

Match drawn
P Sara Oval, Colombo
Umpires: Gamini Dissanayake and Ravindra Kottahachchi

- Sinhalese Sports Club won the toss and elected to field.
- Angelo Perera (Nondescripts Cricket Club) became only the second batsman to score a double century in each innings of a first-class match.

7–10 February 2019
Scorecard

Nondescripts Cricket Club	v	Colombo Cricket Club
411 (104.3 overs); Mahela Udawatte 162 (262); Wanindu Hasaranga 4/63 (14.3 overs)		427 (98.3 overs); Ron Chandraguptha 118 (199); Chaturanga de Silva 5/104 (28 overs)
305 (73.4 overs); Chaturanga de Silva 114 (87); Wanindu Hasaranga 6/80 (26.4 overs)		290/5 (57.3 overs); Minod Bhanuka 85 (101); Saranga Rajaguru 4/58 (12 overs)

Colombo Cricket Club won by 5 wickets
Colts Cricket Club Ground, Colombo
Umpires: Hemantha Boteju and Deepal Gunawardene

- Colombo Cricket Club won the toss and elected to field.
- Pathum Nissanka (Nondescripts Cricket Club) scored his 1,000th run in the tournament.

7–10 February 2019
Scorecard

Sinhalese Sports Club	v	Chilaw Marians Cricket Club
374 (101 overs); Sachithra Senanayake 89 (121); Sagar Paresh 4/138 (44 overs)		274 (73.3 overs); Thikshila de Silva 72 (70); Sachithra Senanayake 6/73 (26 overs)
265/9d (69 overs); Kavindu Kulasekara 71 (127); Sagar Paresh 5/107 (28 overs)		368/7 (98 overs); Nimesh Vimukthi 120 (171); Sachithra Senanayake 3/100 (31 overs)

Chilaw Marians Cricket Club won by 3 wickets
P Sara Oval, Colombo
Umpires: Prageeth Rambukwella and Ruchira Palliyaguruge

- Sinhalese Sports Club won the toss and elected to bat.
- Dilshan Sanjeewa (Chilaw Marians Cricket Club) made his first-class debut.

7–10 February 2019
Scorecard

Tamil Union Cricket and Athletic Club	v	Saracens Sports Club
330 (101.4 overs); Manoj Sarathchandra 68 (120); Saliya Saman 3/40 (22 overs)		574/9d (166.4 overs); Promod Maduwantha 212 (483); Ramith Rambukwella 4/96 (27.4 overs)
345/3 (83.2 overs); Tharanga Paranavitana 175 (225); Gamindu Kanishka 2/47 (14.2 overs)

Match drawn
Nondescripts Cricket Club Ground, Colombo
Umpires: Ravindra Kottahachchi and Lyndon Hannibal

- Tamil Union Cricket and Athletic Club won the toss and elected to bat.
- Dananjana de Silva (Tamil Union Cricket and Athletic Club) made his first-class debut.

7–10 February 2019
Scorecard

Colts Cricket Club	v	Sri Lanka Army Sports Club
574/9d (148.1 overs); Dhananjaya Lakshan 141 (213); Asela Gunaratne 2/40 (15 overs)		168 (48.5 overs); Himasha Liyanage 46 (60); Nalin Priyadarshana 4/32 (10.5 overs)
41/0 (9 overs); Priyamal Perera 29* (30)		446 (108 overs) (f/o); Dilshan de Soysa 139 (219); Nisala Tharaka 3/74 (21 overs)

Colts Cricket Club won by 10 wickets
FTZ Sports Complex, Katunayake
Umpires: Raveendra Wimalasiri and Pradeep Udawatta

- Colts Cricket Club won the toss and elected to bat.
- Nipun Ransika (Colts Cricket Club) made his first-class debut.

== See also ==
- 2018–19 Premier League Tournament Tier B
