= Bangladesh A cricket team in Sri Lanka in 2019–20 =

International cricket tour

	Sri Lanka A	Bangladesh A
- Dates: 29 September – 12 October 2019
Captains	Ashan Priyanjan	Mominul Haque (FC); Mohammad Mithun (LA)

FC series
- Result: 2-match series drawn 0–0
Most runs	Kamindu Mendis (298)	Shadman Islam (130)
Most wickets	Mohamed Shiraz (5); Asitha Fernando (5)	Mehedi Hasan (12)

LA series
- Result: Bangladesh A won the 3-match series 2–1
Most runs	Kamindu Mendis (139)	Saif Hassan (154)
Most wickets	Shiran Fernando (7)	Ebadot Hossain (4); Abu Hider (4)

The Bangladesh A cricket team toured Sri Lanka to play 2 Unofficial Tests and 3 Unofficial ODIs against Sri Lanka A cricket team in September and October 2019.

== Squads ==
First class		List A	
Sri Lanka A	Bangladesh A	Sri Lanka A	Bangladesh A
Ashan Priyanjan (c); Pathum Nissanka; Sangeeth Cooray; Lahiru Udara; Kamindu Mendis; Priyamal Perera; Ashen Bandara; Manoj Sarathchandra; Charith Asalanka; Ramesh Mendis; Nishan Peiris; Malinda Pushpakumara; Prabath Jayasuriya; Vishwa Fernando; Chamika Karunaratne; Asitha Fernando; Mohamed Shiraz; Shiran Fernando; Jeffrey Vandersay	Mominul Haque (c); Shadman Islam; Jahurul Islam; Mohammad Mithun; Nurul Hasan; Anamul Haque; Soumya Sarkar; Abu Jayed; Ebadot Hossain; Sunzamul Islam; Rishad Hossain; Salauddin Sakil; Mehedi Hasan Rana; Nazmul Hossain Shanto; Saif Hassan; Mehedi Hasan	Ashan Priyanjan (c); Pathum Nissanka; Sandun Weerakkody; Lahiru Udara; Kamindu Mendis; Priyamal Perera; Ashen Bandara; Ramesh Mendis; Amila Aponso; Jeffrey Vandersay; Vishwa Fernando; Chamika Karunaratne; Asitha Fernando; Ishan Jayaratne; Shiran Fernando; Shammu Ashan; Asela Gunaratne	Mohammad Mithun (c); Shadman Islam; Jahurul Islam; Mominul Haque; Nurul Hasan; Anamul Haque; Soumya Sarkar; Abu Jayed; Ebadot Hossain; Sunzamul Islam; Rishad Hossain; Salauddin Sakil; Mehedi Hasan Rana; Nazmul Hossain Shanto; Saif Hassan; Mehedi Hasan; Ariful Haque; Afif Hossain; Mohammad Naim; Abu Hider

== First class series ==
=== 1st Unofficial Test ===
29 September–1 October 2019
Scorecard

Bangladesh A	v	Sri Lanka A
360 (120.1 overs); Mohammad Mithun 92 (120); Ramesh Mendis 3/57 (23 overs)		450 (121.1 overs); Kamindu Mendis 169 (282); Mehedi Hasan 5/150 (46.1 overs)
1/0 (1 over); Jahurul Islam 1* (2)

Match drawn
Mahinda Rajapaksa International Cricket Stadium, Hambantota
Umpires: Deepal Gunawardene (SL) and Rohitha Kottahachchi (SL)

- Bangladesh A won the toss and elected to bat.
- The match was rescheduled from 23 September due to rain and was reduced to three day match.

=== 2nd Unofficial Test ===
4–7 October 2019
Scorecard

Sri Lanka A	v	Bangladesh A
268 (90.2 overs); Pathum Nissanka 85 (186); Mehedi Hasan 7/84 (37 overs)		330 (83.1 overs); Mominul Haque 117 (190); Mohamed Shiraz 5/63 (21.1 overs)
357/2 (107 overs); Pathum Nissanka 192 (307); Rishad Hossain 1/78 (23 overs)

Match drawn
Mahinda Rajapaksa International Cricket Stadium, Hambantota
Umpires: Hemantha Boteju (SL) and Ravindra Kottahachchi (SL)

- Sri Lanka A won the toss and elected to bat.

== List A series ==
=== 1st Unofficial ODI ===
9 October 2019
09:45
Scorecard

Bangladesh A 116 (33.3 overs)	v	Sri Lanka A 120/3 (25.5 overs)
Saif Hassan 32 (47); Ashan Priyanjan 4/10 (4.3 overs)		Ashan Priyanjan 50* (62); Abu Hider 1/14 (6 overs)

Sri Lanka A won by 7 wickets
R. Premadasa Stadium, Colombo
Umpires: Keerthi Bandara (SL) and Gamini Dissanayake (SL)

- Bangladesh A won the toss and elected to bat.

=== 2nd Unofficial ODI ===
10 October 2019
09:45
Scorecard

Sri Lanka A 226/9 (50 overs)	v	Bangladesh A 227/9 (50 overs)
Kamindu Mendis 61 (67); Abu Hider 2/42 (10 overs)		Mohammad Naim 68 (59); Ramesh Mendis 3/40 (9 overs)

Bangladesh A won by 1 wicket
R. Premadasa Stadium, Colombo
Umpires: Kapila Kottahachchi (SL) and Nilan De Silva (SL)
Player of the match: Mohammad Naim (Bangladesh A)

- Bangladesh A won the toss and elected to field.

=== 3rd Unofficial ODI ===
12 October 2019
09:45
Scorecard

Bangladesh A 322/9 (50 overs)	v	Sri Lanka A 130/6 (24.4 overs)
Saif Hassan 117 (110); Shiran Fernando 4/50 (10 overs)		Kamindu Mendis 55 (65); Saif Hassan 2/25 (6 overs)

Bangladesh A won by 98 runs (DLS method)
R. Premadasa Stadium, Colombo
Umpires: Deepal Gunawardene (SL) and Pradeep Udawatta (SL)
Player of the match: Saif Hassan (Bangladesh A)

- Sri Lanka A won the toss and elected to field.
- Sri Lanka A were set a revised target of 229 runs from 24.4 overs.
