= Sri Lanka A cricket team in Bangladesh in 2018 =

International cricket matches

| | Bangladesh A | Sri Lanka A |
- Dates: 26 June – 22 July 2018 (Note: While four days of play were scheduled for the 3rd Unofficial Test, the match reached a result in three days.)
| Captains | Mosaddek Hossain (FC) (Note: Mohammad Mithun and Lahiru Thirimanne captained Bangladesh A and Sri Lanka A for the third First Class match respectively.); Mohammad Mithun (LA) | Dimuth Karunaratne (FC); Thisara Perera (LA) |

FC series
- Result: Sri Lanka A won the 3-match series 1–0
| Most runs | Sabbir Rahman (165) | Lahiru Thirimanne (347) |
| Most wickets | Khaled Ahmed (5) | Malinda Pushpakumara (9) |
- Player of the series: Lahiru Thirimanne (Sri Lanka A)

LA series
- Result: 3-match series drawn 1–1
| Most runs | Ariful Haque (74) | Thisara Perera (177) |
| Most wickets | Khaled Ahmed (7) | Malinda Pushpakumara (4) |
- Player of the series: Thisara Perera (Sri Lanka A)

The visiting Sri Lanka A cricket team played 3 first-class matches and 3 List A matches against the Bangladesh A cricket team in June and July 2018.

Sri Lanka A won the first-class series 1–0. The List-A series was drawn 1-1.

== Squads ==
| First class | | List A | |
| Bangladesh A | Sri Lanka A | Bangladesh A | Sri Lanka A |
|---|---|---|---|
| Mosaddek Hossain (c); Shadman Islam; Soumya Sarkar; Mizanur Rahman; Afif Hossain; Sabbir Rahman; Shoriful Islam; Mohammad Saifuddin; Nayeem Hasan; Rishad Ahmed; Saif Hassan; Zakir Hasan; Tushar Imran; Nazmul Islam; Abu Hider Rony; Anamul Haque; Mohammad Mithun; Ebadat Hossain; Khaled Ahmed; Mustafizur Rahman | Dimuth Karunaratne (c); Sadeera Samarawickrama; Lahiru Thirimanne; Ashan Priyanjan; Charith Asalanka; Shammu Ashan; Manoj Sarathchandra; Prabath Jayasuriya; Lakshan Sandakan; Nishan Peiris; Shehan Madushanka; Nisala Tharaka; Dilesh Gunaratne; Lahiru Milantha; Vishwa Fernando; Chaturanga de Silva; Lasith Ambuldeniya | Shadman Islam (c); Soumya Sarkar; Afif Hossain; Sabbir Rahman; Mohammad Saifuddin; Saif Hassan; Tushar Imran; Nazmul Islam; Abu Hider Rony; Mosaddek Hossain; Nayeem Hasan; Mizanur Rahman; Shoriful Islam; Rishad Hossain; Zakir Hasan; Mohammad Mithun; Khaled Ahmed; Al-Amin Hossain; Fazle Rabbi; Ariful Haque; Sohag Gazi | Thisara Perera (c); Dasun Shanaka; Upul Tharanga; Lahiru Thirimanne; Shehan Jayasuriya; Ashan Priyanjan; Sadeera Samarawickrama; Charith Asalanka; Shammu Ashan; Minod Bhanuka; Malinda Pushpakumara; Nishan Peiris; Shehan Madushanka; Asitha Fernando; Isuru Udana |

== First class series ==
=== 1st Unofficial Test ===
26–29 June 2018
Scorecard

| Sri Lanka A | v | Bangladesh A |
| 449/8d (131.1 overs); Lahiru Thirimanne 168 (339); Khaled Ahmed 4/92 (27 overs) | | 414 (135 overs); Sabbir Rahman 165 (287); Lakshan Sandakan 5/108 (36 overs) |
| 262/2 (57 overs); Dimuth Karunaratne 161 (165); Nazmul Islam 1/37 (10 overs) |

Match drawn
Zohur Ahmed Chowdhury Stadium, Chittagong
Umpires: Anisur Rahman (Ban) and Mahfuzur Rahman (Ban)
Player of the match: Lahiru Thirimanne (Sri Lanka A)

- Sri Lanka A won the toss and elected to bat.

=== 2nd Unofficial Test ===
3–6 July 2018
Scorecard

| Sri Lanka A | v | Bangladesh A |
| 281/5d (80 overs); Lahiru Thirimanne 100* (186); Nayeem Hasan 2/105 (27 overs) | | 59/1 (16 overs); Soumya Sarkar 30* (53); Dilesh Gunaratne 1/31 (6 overs) |

Match drawn
Zohur Ahmed Chowdhury Stadium, Chittagong
Umpires: Anisur Rahman (Ban) and Gazi Sohel (Ban)
Player of the match: Lahiru Thirimanne (Sri Lanka A)

- Sri Lanka A won the toss and elected to bat.
- No play were possible on day 1 and day 2 and only 15 overs of play was possible on day 3 due to rain.

=== 3rd Unofficial Test ===
10–13 July 2018
Scorecard

| Bangladesh A | v | Sri Lanka A |
| 167 (62.3 overs); Zakir Hasan 42 (66); Prabath Jayasuriya 3/12 (7.3 overs) | | 312 (81.1 overs); Shehan Jayasuriya 142 (155); Sunzamul Islam 4/104 (28.1 overs) |
| 107 (45.3 overs); Soumya Sarkar 28 (60); Malinda Pushpakumara 6/46 (19.3 overs) |

Sri Lanka A won by innings and 38 runs
Sylhet International Cricket Stadium, Sylhet
Umpires: Tanvir Ahmed (Ban) and Masudur Rahman (Ban)
Player of the match: Shehan Jayasuriya (Sri Lanka A)

- Bangladesh A won the toss and elected to bat.

== List A series ==
=== 1st Unofficial ODI ===
17 July 2018
09:00
Scorecard

| Bangladesh A 280/7 (50 overs) | v | Sri Lanka A 278 (50 overs) |
| Mizanur Rahman 67 (107); Dasun Shanaka 1/24 (5 overs) | | Dasun Shanaka 78 (78); Khaled Ahmed 4/72 (10 overs) |

Bangladesh A won by 2 runs
Sylhet International Cricket Stadium, Sylhet
Umpires: Morshed Ali Khan (Ban) and Masudur Rahman (Ban)
Player of the match: Ariful Haque (Bangladesh A)

- Sri Lanka A won the toss and elected to field.

=== 2nd Unofficial ODI ===
19 July 2018
09:00
Scorecard

| Sri Lanka A 275 (49.4 overs) | v | Bangladesh A 208 (44.3 overs) |
| Thisara Perera 111 (88); Nayeem Hasan 3/42 (10 overs) | | Al-Amin 46 (65); Malinda Pushpakumara 3/32 (9.3 overs) |

Sri Lanka A won by 67 runs
Sylhet International Cricket Stadium, Sylhet
Umpires: Morshed Ali Khan (Ban) and Masudur Rahman (Ban)
Player of the match: Thisara Perera (Sri Lanka A)

- Sri Lanka A won the toss and elected to bat.

=== 3rd Unofficial ODI ===
22 July 2018
09:00
Scorecard

| Sri Lanka A 240/9 (45 overs) | v | Bangladesh A 12/0 (3.4 overs) |
| Sadeera Samarawickrama 75 (83); Sunzamul Islam 4/24 (7 overs) | | Saif Hassan 10* (13) |

No result
Sylhet International Cricket Stadium, Sylhet
Umpires: Tanvir Ahmed (Ban) and Morshed Ali Khan (Ban)

- Sri Lanka A won the toss and elected to bat.
- Match was reduced to 45 overs due to rain.
