= Sri Lankan cricket team in South Africa in 2018–19 =

International cricket tour

	South Africa	Sri Lanka
- Dates: 13 February – 24 March 2019
Captains	Faf du Plessis (Note: JP Duminy was named captain for the 2nd and 3rd T20Is.)	Dimuth Karunaratne (Tests); Lasith Malinga (ODIs & T20Is)

Test series
- Result: Sri Lanka won the 2-match series 2–0
Most runs	Quinton de Kock (222)	Kusal Perera (224)
Most wickets	Kagiso Rabada (8)	Vishwa Fernando (12)
- Player of the series: Kusal Perera (SL)

One Day International series
- Results: South Africa won the 5-match series 5–0
Most runs	Quinton de Kock (353)	Kusal Mendis (202)
Most wickets	Imran Tahir (9)	Dhananjaya de Silva (5)
- Player of the series: Quinton de Kock (SA)

Twenty20 International series
- Results: South Africa won the 3-match series 3–0
Most runs	Reeza Hendricks (139)	Isuru Udana (132)
Most wickets	Andile Phehlukwayo (7)	Lasith Malinga (3)
- Player of the series: Reeza Hendricks (SA)

The Sri Lanka cricket team toured South Africa in February and March 2019 to play two Tests, five One Day Internationals (ODIs) and three Twenty20 International (T20I) matches. The ODI fixtures were part of both teams' preparation for the 2019 Cricket World Cup.

In February 2019, Sri Lanka named Dimuth Karunaratne as the captain of their Test side, after Dinesh Chandimal was dropped due to poor form. Chandimal was also omitted from Sri Lanka's ODI squad for the tour. Sri Lanka won the Test series by 2–0, marking their first Test series win in South Africa. It was also the first time that an Asian team had won a Test series in South Africa.

South Africa won the ODI series 5–0. It was the fourth time in less than two years that Sri Lanka had been whitewashed in a five-match ODI series. For the T20I series, Faf du Plessis was named as South Africa's captain for the first match, and JP Duminy for the remaining two fixtures. South Africa also completed a whitewash in the T20I series, winning 3–0.

== Squads ==
Tests		ODIs		T20Is	
South Africa	Sri Lanka	South Africa	Sri Lanka	South Africa	Sri Lanka
Faf du Plessis (c); Hashim Amla; Temba Bavuma; Theunis de Bruyn; Quinton de Kock (wk); Dean Elgar; Zubayr Hamza; Keshav Maharaj; Aiden Markram; Wiaan Mulder; Duanne Olivier; Vernon Philander; Kagiso Rabada; Dale Steyn	Dimuth Karunaratne (c); Niroshan Dickwella (vc, wk); Lasith Embuldeniya; Oshada Fernando; Vishwa Fernando; Chamika Karunaratne; Suranga Lakmal; Kusal Mendis; Angelo Perera; Kusal Perera; Kasun Rajitha; Lakshan Sandakan; Mohamed Shiraz; Kaushal Silva; Dhananjaya de Silva; Milinda Siriwardana; Lahiru Thirimanne	Faf du Plessis (c); ~~Hashim Amla~~; Quinton de Kock (wk); JP Duminy; Reeza Hendricks; Aiden Markram; David Miller; Wiaan Mulder; Lungi Ngidi; Anrich Nortje; Andile Phehlukwayo; Dwaine Pretorius; Kagiso Rabada; Tabraiz Shamsi; Dale Steyn; Imran Tahir; Rassie van der Dussen	Lasith Malinga (c); Niroshan Dickwella (vc, wk); Akila Dananjaya; Avishka Fernando; Oshada Fernando; Vishwa Fernando; Kamindu Mendis; Kusal Mendis; Angelo Perera; Kusal Perera; Priyamal Perera; Thisara Perera; Kasun Rajitha; Lakshan Sandakan; Dhananjaya de Silva; Upul Tharanga; Isuru Udana	Faf du Plessis (c); JP Duminy (c); Junior Dala; Quinton de Kock (wk); Reeza Hendricks; Aiden Markram; David Miller; Chris Morris; ~~Lungi Ngidi~~; ~~Anrich Nortje~~; Andile Phehlukwayo; Dwaine Pretorius; Sinethemba Qeshile (wk); Kagiso Rabada; Tabraiz Shamsi; Lutho Sipamla; Dale Steyn; Imran Tahir; Rassie van der Dussen	Lasith Malinga (c); Niroshan Dickwella (vc, wk); Akila Dananjaya; Asitha Fernando; Avishka Fernando; Suranga Lakmal; Kamindu Mendis; Kusal Mendis; Angelo Perera; Priyamal Perera; Thisara Perera; Sadeera Samarawickrama; Lakshan Sandakan; Dhananjaya de Silva; Isuru Udana; Jeffrey Vandersay

Ahead of the last two ODIs, Aiden Markram, Hashim Amla and JP Duminy were added to South Africa's squad, with Reeza Hendricks and Wiaan Mulder being dropped. However, the day after Amla was added to South Africa's ODI squad, he took compassionate leave, missing the last two matches, with Hendricks recalled. Kusal Perera was ruled out of Sri Lanka's ODI squad for the final two ODIs, after suffering a hamstring injury in the third ODI. Lungi Ngidi and Anrich Nortje were ruled out of South Africa's T20I squad for the final two T20Is due to injury. Junior Dala was added to South Africa's squad for the third T20I.

== Test series ==
=== 1st Test ===
13–17 February 2019 (Note: While five days of play were scheduled for each Test, the first Test reached a result in four days, and the second Test reached a result in three days.)
Scorecard

South Africa	v	Sri Lanka
235 (59.4 overs); Quinton de Kock 80 (94); Vishwa Fernando 4/62 (17 overs)		191 (59.2 overs); Kusal Perera 51 (63); Dale Steyn 4/48 (20 overs)
259 (79.1 overs); Faf du Plessis 90 (182); Lasith Embuldeniya 5/66 (26 overs)		304/9 (85.3 overs); Kusal Perera 153* (200); Keshav Maharaj 3/71 (20 overs)

Sri Lanka won by 1 wicket
Kingsmead Cricket Ground, Durban
Umpires: Aleem Dar (Pak) and Richard Kettleborough (Eng)
Player of the match: Kusal Perera (SL)

- Sri Lanka won the toss and elected to field.
- Lasith Embuldeniya and Oshada Fernando (SL) both made their Test debuts.
- Dimuth Karunaratne captained Sri Lanka for the first time in Tests, and he also scored his 4,000th run in Test cricket.
- Lasith Embuldeniya became the fourth bowler for Sri Lanka to take a five-wicket haul on debut in Tests.
- Kusal Perera's 153 not out was the highest score by a batsman for Sri Lanka in a successful run chase in Tests.
- Kusal Perera and Vishwa Fernando (SL) made the highest tenth-wicket partnership in a successful run chase in Tests (78 runs).

=== 2nd Test ===
21–25 February 2019
Scorecard

South Africa	v	Sri Lanka
222 (61.2 overs); Quinton de Kock 86 (87); Vishwa Fernando 3/62 (18.2 overs)		154 (37.4 overs); Niroshan Dickwella 42 (36); Kagiso Rabada 4/38 (12.4 overs)
128 (44.3 overs); Faf du Plessis 50* (70); Suranga Lakmal 4/39 (16.3 overs)		197/2 (45.4 overs); Kusal Mendis 84* (110); Duanne Olivier 1/46 (12 overs)

Sri Lanka won by 8 wickets
St. George's Park, Port Elizabeth
Umpires: Aleem Dar (Pak) and Ian Gould (Eng)
Player of the match: Kusal Mendis (SL)

- South Africa won the toss and elected to bat.
- Wiaan Mulder (SA) made his Test debut.

== Tour match ==
=== 50-over match: Cricket South Africa Invitation XI vs Sri Lanka ===
28 February 2019
10:00
Scorecard

Cricket South Africa Invitation XI; 304 (48 overs)	v	Sri Lanka; 307/4 (41 overs)
Raynard van Tonder 164 (156); Lasith Malinga 5/35 (7 overs)		Avishka Fernando 72 (46); Okuhle Cele 2/37 (6 overs)

Sri Lanka won by 6 wickets
Willowmoore Park, Benoni
Umpires: Bongani Jele (SA) and Allahudien Paleker (SA)

- Cricket South Africa Invitation XI won the toss and elected to bat.

== ODI series ==
=== 1st ODI ===
3 March 2019
10:00
Scorecard

Sri Lanka; 231 (47 overs)	v	South Africa; 232/2 (38.5 overs)
Kusal Mendis 60 (73); Imran Tahir 3/26 (10 overs)		Faf du Plessis 112* (114); Vishwa Fernando 1/43 (5 overs)

South Africa won by 8 wickets
Wanderers Stadium, Johannesburg
Umpires: Bongani Jele (SA) and Richard Kettleborough (Eng)
Player of the match: Faf du Plessis (SA)

- South Africa won the toss and elected to field.
- Anrich Nortje (SA) and Oshada Fernando (SL) both made their ODI debuts.

=== 2nd ODI ===
6 March 2019
13:00 (D/N)
Scorecard

South Africa; 251 (45.1 overs)	v	Sri Lanka; 138 (32.2 overs)
Quinton de Kock 94 (70); Thisara Perera 3/26 (7 overs)		Oshada Fernando 31 (45); Kagiso Rabada 3/43 (9 overs)

South Africa won by 113 runs
Centurion Park, Centurion
Umpires: Aleem Dar (Pak) and Shaun George (SA)
Player of the match: Quinton de Kock (SA)

- Sri Lanka won the toss and elected to field.
- Thisara Perera (SL) played in his 150th ODI.
- Faf du Plessis (SA) scored his 5,000th run in ODIs.
- Kagiso Rabada (SA) took his 100th wicket in ODIs.

=== 3rd ODI ===
10 March 2019
10:00
Scorecard

South Africa; 331/5 (50 overs)	v	Sri Lanka; 121/5 (24 overs)
Quinton de Kock 121 (108); Isuru Udana 2/50 (8 overs)		Kusal Mendis 41 (31); Imran Tahir 2/19 (5 overs)

South Africa won by 71 runs (DLS method)
Kingsmead Cricket Ground, Durban
Umpires: Adrian Holdstock (SA) and Richard Kettleborough (Eng)
Player of the match: Quinton de Kock (SA)

- Sri Lanka won the toss and elected to field.
- Sri Lanka were set a revised target of 193 runs from 24 overs due to rain.
- Kamindu Mendis (SL) made his ODI debut.

=== 4th ODI ===
13 March 2019
13:00 (D/N)
Scorecard

Sri Lanka; 189 (39.2 overs)	v	South Africa; 190/4 (32.5 overs)
Isuru Udana 78 (57); Anrich Nortje 3/57 (8 overs)		Quinton de Kock 51 (57); Dhananjaya de Silva 3/41 (10 overs)

South Africa won by 6 wickets
St. George's Park, Port Elizabeth
Umpires: Aleem Dar (Pak) and Shaun George (SA)
Player of the match: Isuru Udana (SL)

- South Africa won the toss and elected to field.
- Priyamal Perera (SL) made his ODI debut.
- Isuru Udana and Kasun Rajitha made the highest partnership for the tenth wicket for Sri Lanka in ODIs (58 runs).

=== 5th ODI ===
16 March 2019
13:00 (D/N)
Scorecard

Sri Lanka; 225 (49.3 overs)	v	South Africa; 135/2 (28 overs)
Kusal Mendis 56 (84); Kagiso Rabada 3/50 (10 overs)		Aiden Markram 67* (75); Thisara Perera 1/20 (5 overs)

South Africa won by 41 runs (DLS method)
Newlands Cricket Ground, Cape Town
Umpires: Shaun George (SA) and Richard Kettleborough (Eng)
Player of the match: Aiden Markram (SA)

- Sri Lanka won the toss and elected to bat.
- A floodlight failure during South Africa's innings prevented any further play.

== T20I series ==
=== 1st T20I ===
19 March 2019
18:00 (N)
Scorecard

Sri Lanka; 134/7 (20 overs)	v	South Africa; 134/8 (20 overs)
Kamindu Mendis 41 (29); Andile Phehlukwayo 3/25 (4 overs)		David Miller 41 (23); Lasith Malinga 2/11 (4 overs)

Match tied
(South Africa won the Super Over)
Newlands Cricket Ground, Cape Town
Umpires: Adrian Holdstock (SA) and Bongani Jele (SA)
Player of the match: David Miller (SA)

- South Africa won the toss and elected to field.
- Avishka Fernando (SL) made his T20I debut.
- Imran Tahir (SA) played in his last T20I.

=== 2nd T20I ===
22 March 2019
18:00 (N)
Scorecard

South Africa; 180/3 (20 overs)	v	Sri Lanka; 164/9 (20 overs)
Reeza Hendricks 65 (46); Lasith Malinga 1/26 (4 overs)		Isuru Udana 84* (48); Chris Morris 3/32 (4 overs)

South Africa won by 16 runs
Centurion Park, Centurion
Umpires: Shaun George (SA) and Bongani Jele (SA)
Player of the match: Rassie van der Dussen (SA)

- Sri Lanka won the toss and elected to field.
- Aiden Markram and Sinethemba Qeshile (SA) both made their T20I debuts.

=== 3rd T20I ===
24 March 2019
14:30
Scorecard

South Africa; 198/2 (20 overs)	v	Sri Lanka; 137 (15.4 overs)
Dwaine Pretorius 77* (42); Jeffrey Vandersay 1/35 (3 overs)		Niroshan Dickwella 38 (22); Andile Phehlukwayo 4/24 (3 overs)

South Africa won by 45 runs (DLS method)
Wanderers Stadium, Johannesburg
Umpires: Adrian Holdstock (SA) and Allahudien Paleker (SA)
Player of the match: Dwaine Pretorius (SA)

- Sri Lanka won the toss and elected to field.
- Sri Lanka were set a revised target of 183 runs from 17 overs due to rain.
