= Angelo Perera =

Sri Lankan cricketer

Personal information
- Full name: Angelo Kanishka Perera
- Born: 23 February 1990 (age 36); Moratuwa, Sri Lanka
- Height: 5 ft 8 in (1.73 m)
- Batting: Right-handed
- Bowling: Slow left-arm orthodox
- Role: All-rounder

International information
- National side: Sri Lanka (2013–2019)
- ODI debut (cap 156): 26 July 2013 v South Africa
- Last ODI: 2 October 2019 v Pakistan
- T20I debut (cap 50): 31 March 2013 v Bangladesh
- Last T20I: 9 October 2019 v Pakistan

Domestic team information
- Years: Team
- Colts
- Nondescripts
- Southern Express
- 2020: Dambulla Viiking
- 2021: Kandy Warriors
- 2022: Sylhet Sunrisers
- 2023-present: Seattle Orcas

Career statistics
Competition	ODI	T20I
Matches	6	6
Runs scored	52	59
Batting average	13.00	11.80
100s/50s	0/0	0/0
Top score	31	16
Balls bowled	36	6
Wickets	0	0
Bowling average	–	–
5 wickets in innings	–	–
10 wickets in match	–	–
Best bowling	–	–
Catches/stumpings	1/–	1/–
Medal record
Men's Cricket
Representing Sri Lanka
South Asian Games
Silver medal – second place	2010 Dhaka	Team
- Source: Cricinfo, 5 January 2022

Angelo Kanishka Perera (born 23 February 1990), or Angelo Perera, is a former professional cricketer, who played limited over cricket for Sri Lanka. He is a right-handed batsman and left-arm slow bowler who plays for Nondescripts Cricket Club. He was born in Moratuwa and attended to St Peter's College, Colombo. In 2019, he became only the second batsman after Arthur Fagg to score double centuries in both innings of any first class match. Perera retired from international cricket in January 2022, having last playing for the national team in 2019.

== Early career ==
Perera made his cricketing debut in a Bangladesh Under-19s tour of Sri Lanka in 2007, and later played in a series against Sri Lanka. He played in two warm-up matches and two competition matches in the 2007-08 Under-19s World Cup, scoring 9 runs in two innings.

He played for Sri Lanka Schools in an Inter-Provincial Twenty20 Tournament in 2007–08, and again the following season. Perera made two further Under-19 Test appearances and four One-Day International appearances in a return tour for Sri Lanka against Bangladesh in 2009. Perera made his debut List A appearance against Badureliya Sports Club in 2009–10, taking three wickets in a comfortable victory for the team.

Perera made his first-class debut against Badureliya Sports Club in 2009–10. Within Nondescripts Cricket Club, Perera scored brilliant 244 runs against Sri Lanka Air Force Sports Club gave his team by an innings and 39 runs. The 405 partnership by him and Jehan Mubarak in the match was the highest partnership for the fourth wicket in a first-class match on Sri Lankan soil. Perera blasted 30 fours and six sixes in his knock that required only 204 balls and it was also his highest first-class score

== Domestic career ==
In March 2018, he was named in Colombo's squad for the 2017–18 Super Four Provincial Tournament. The following month, he was also named in Colombo's squad for the 2018 Super Provincial One Day Tournament. In August 2018, he was named in Galle's squad the 2018 SLC T20 League.

In February 2019, in the penultimate round of the Super Eight fixtures in the 2018–19 Premier League Tournament, Perera scored a double-century in each innings. This had only been done once before in first-class cricket, by Arthur Fagg for Kent against Essex in the 1938 County Championship in England. In March 2019, he was named in Colombo's squad for the 2019 Super Provincial One Day Tournament. In December 2019, he was the leading run-scorer in the 2019–20 Invitation Limited Over Tournament, with 384 runs in nine matches.

In October 2020, he was drafted by the Dambulla Hawks for the inaugural edition of the Lanka Premier League. In August 2021, he was named as the vice-captain of the SLC Blues team for the 2021 SLC Invitational T20 League tournament. In November 2021, he was selected to play for the Kandy Warriors following the players' draft for the 2021 Lanka Premier League.

== International career ==
Perera made his T20I debut against Bangladesh in 2013. In the same year, he made his ODI debut against South Africa at Pallekele International Cricket Stadium. After ups and downs, Perera called for the ODI squad against Australia, where he played in the fourth ODI at Dambulla.

He was the winning captain of the Sri Lankan team during the 2nd edition of the 2017 Emerging Cup held in Bangladesh. This was the first time Sri Lanka went onto win this tournament by defeating Pakistan in the finals.

In February 2019, he was named in Sri Lanka's Test squad for their series against South Africa, but he did not play.

== Personal life ==
Angelo Perera married Ravindi Samarasekera on 5 May 2018 at the age of 28. The marriage took place at St. Mary's Church.
