= Salinda =

Salinda is a given name. Notable people with the name include:

- Salinda Dissanayake (1958–2019), Sri Lankan politician
- Salinda Ushan (born 1997), Sri Lankan cricketer
