= Shehan =

Shehan (Sinhala: ෂෙහාන්, ශෙහාන්) is a Sinhalese name that may refer to the following notable people:

Given name

- Shehan Ambepitiya (born 1990), Sri Lankan sprinter
- Shehan Fernando (born 1993), Sri Lankan cricketer
- Shehan Hettiarachchi (born 1994), Sri Lankan cricketer
- Shehan Hirudika (born 1990), Sri Lankan cricketer
- Shehan Jayasuriya (born 1991), Sri Lankan cricketer
- Shehan Karunatilaka (born 1975), Sri Lankan writer
- Shehan Madushanka (born 1995), Sri Lankan cricketer
- Shehan Pathirana (born 1992), Sri Lankan rugby union player
- Shehan Sandaruwan (born 1996), Sri Lankan cricketer
- Shehan de Silva (born 1992), Sri Lankan cricketer

Surname

- Lawrence Shehan (1898–1984), American prelate of the Roman Catholic Church
- Malindu Shehan (born 1994), Sri Lankan cricketer
- Rukshan Shehan (born 1995), Sri Lankan cricketer
- Steve Shehan (born 1957), French-American percussionist and music composer

== See also ==
- Sheehan
