= Lakshana (disambiguation) =

Lakshana may refer to:

- Lakshana, a Hindu philosophy
- Lakshana (actress), Indian actress
- Lakshana (TV series), Indian television drama

== See also ==
- Lakshan, a male given name
