= Jayamanne =

Jayamanne is a surname. Notable people with the surname include:

- Andrew Jayamanne (1943–2014), Sri Lankan cinematographer
- B. A. W. Jayamanne (1908–1965), Sri Lankan playwright
- Eddie Jayamanne (1915–1981), Sri Lankan comedian
- Prasansana Jayamanne (born 1994), Sri Lankan cricketer
