= Irshad Umar =

Sri Lankan cricketer (born 1995)

Personal information
- Full name: Mohamed Irshad Umar
- Born: 14 June 1995 (age 31)
- Batting: Right-handed
- Bowling: Legbreak
- Source: Cricinfo, 3 April 2017

Irshad Umar (born 14 June 1995) is a Sri Lankan cricketer. He made his List A debut for Nuwara Eliya District in the 2016–17 Districts One Day Tournament on 21 March 2017. He made his first-class debut for Moors Sports Club in the 2018–19 Premier League Tournament in Sri Lanka on 28 December 2018.
