= Chamikara Edirisinghe =

Sri Lankan cricketer (born 1991)

Personal information
- Born: 4 April 1991 (age 35); Dambadeniya, Sri Lanka
- Batting: Left-handed
- Bowling: Left-arm Orthodox
- Source: ESPNcricinfo, 7 January 2017

Chamikara Edirisinghe (born 4 April 1991) is a Sri Lankan cricketer. He made his first-class debut for Kurunegala Youth Cricket Club in the 2011–12 Premier Trophy on 20 January 2012. On 4 January 2019, bowling for Saracens Sports Club against Colombo Cricket Club in the 2018–19 Premier League Tournament, Edirisinghe took 9 wickets for 87 runs in the first innings of the match. He was the leading wicket-taker for Saracens Sports Club in the tournament, with 52 dismissals in ten matches. He signed with Chorley Cricket Club to play cricket in England in the 2019 season.

In March 2019, he was named in Galle's squad for the 2019 Super Provincial One Day Tournament. In October 2020, he was drafted by the Kandy Tuskers for the inaugural edition of the Lanka Premier League. In November 2021, he was selected to play for the Dambulla Giants following the players' draft for the 2021 Lanka Premier League.
