= Sameera de Zoysa =

Sri Lankan cricketer (born 1987)

Personal information
- Full name: Rannulu Sameera Sadarange Saman de Zoysa
- Born: 31 January 1987 (age 39); Kurunegala, Sri Lanka
- Batting: Left-handed
- Role: Wicket-keeper batsman

Domestic team information
- Years: Team
- 2004–2006: Kurunegala Youth Cricket Club
- 2006–present: Ragama Cricket Club (squad no. 44)
- Source: ESPNcricinfo, 22 April 2016

Rannulu Sameera Sadarange Saman de Zoysa (born 31 January 1987) is a Sri Lankan first-class cricketer who plays for Ragama Cricket Club. de Zoysa was part of the Sri Lanka national under-19 cricket team in the 2006 Under-19 Cricket World Cup in Sri Lanka as a wicket-keeper-batsman. He was the leading run-scorer for Ragama Cricket Club in the 2018–19 Premier League Tournament, with 515 runs in eight matches.
