= 2019 Super Provincial One Day Tournament =

Cricket tournament

- Dates: 4 – 11 April 2019
- Administrator(s): Sri Lanka Cricket
- Cricket format: List A cricket
- Tournament format(s): Round-robin and final
- Host(s): Sri Lanka
- Champions: Colombo; Galle
- Participants: 4
- Player of the series: Dhananjaya de Silva
- Most runs: Angelo Mathews (227)
- Most wickets: Lasith Malinga (8)

The 2019 Super Provincial One Day Tournament was a List A cricket tournament that was played in Sri Lanka between 4 and 11 April 2019. Four teams took part in the competition: Colombo, Dambulla, Galle and Kandy, with Galle being the defending champions.

Initially, Sri Lanka Cricket (SLC) said that players would only be considered for the 2019 Cricket World Cup if they played in this tournament. Lasith Malinga was originally expected to play in the tournament and miss out on some part of the 2019 Indian Premier League (IPL). The SLC then changed its stance, granting permission for Malinga to miss the tournament and play in the IPL. However, days before the start of the tournament, Malinga was listed as playing in a press release issued by Sri Lanka Cricket. Malinga played for Galle in the opening fixture of the tournament, the day after appearing for the Mumbai Indians in the IPL. In the match against Kandy, he took seven wickets for 49 runs, his best figures in List A cricket.

Following the conclusion of the round-robin matches, Galle and Colombo had progressed to the tournament final. Dambulla won the third place play-off match, after they beat Kandy by 94 runs. The final finished as a no result, after rain stopped play during the innings break, therefore Colombo and Galle shared the title. Angelo Mathews was named the best batsman of the tournament, Lasith Malinga the best bowler and Dhananjaya de Silva was named the player of the tournament.

== Squads ==
The following teams and squads were named to compete in the tournament:

Colombo	Galle	Kandy	Dambulla
Dinesh Chandimal (c); Upul Tharanga (vc); Avishka Fernando; Angelo Perera; Ashan Priyanjan; Kamindu Mendis; Seekkuge Prasanna; Akila Dananjaya; Suranga Lakmal; Asitha Fernando; Chamika Karunaratne; Chamara Silva; Mohammed Shiraz; Shehan Jayasuriya	Lasith Malinga (c); Lahiru Thirimanne (vc); Kusal Mendis; Sandun Weerakkody; Mahela Udawatte; Minod Bhanuka; Dhananjaya De Silva; Milinda Siriwardena; Nishan Peiris; Chamikara Edirisinghe; Dushmantha Chameera; Lahiru Madushanka; Sammu Ashan; Shehan Madushanka; Wanindu Hasaranga	Dimuth Karunarathne (c); Thisara Perera (vc); Sadeera Samarawickrama; Pathum Nissanka; Priyamal Perera; Roshen Silva; Asela Gunaratne; Jeffrey Vandersay; Malinda Pushpakumara; Kasun Rajitha; Nuwan Pradeep; Chathuranga De Silva; Sachithra Senanayake; Dilesh Gunaratne; Manoj Sarathchandra	Angelo Mathews (c); Niroshan Dickwella (vc); Danushka Gunathilake; Oshada Fernando; Bhanuka Rajapaksa; Jeewan Mendis; Dasun Shanaka; Lakshan Sandakan; Prabath Jayasuriya; Isuru Udana; Ishan Jayaratne; Sachithra Serasinghe; Vishwa Fernando; Ashen Bandara; Ramesh Mendis

== Points table ==
Teams	Pld	W	L	NR	Pts	NRR
Galle	3	2	0	1	12	+2.320
Colombo	3	2	0	1	11	+0.955
Kandy	3	1	2	0	5	–0.581
Dambulla	3	0	3	0	0	–1.793

Teams qualified for the final

== Fixtures ==
=== Round-robin ===
4 April 2019
Scorecard

Colombo; 238/9 (50 overs)	v	Dambulla; 156 (36.3 overs)
Chamika Karunaratne 57 (53); Jeevan Mendis 4/36 (10 overs)		Bhanuka Rajapaksa 38 (45); Suranga Lakmal 3/29 (8 overs)

Colombo won by 82 runs
Rangiri Dambulla International Stadium, Dambulla
Umpires: Deepal Gunawardene and Ruchira Palliyaguruge

- Dambulla won the toss and elected to field.

4 April 2019
Scorecard

Galle; 255/9 (50 overs)	v	Kandy; 99 (18.5 overs)
Kusal Mendis 65 (87); Kasun Rajitha 3/44 (9 overs)		Dimuth Karunaratne 35* (48); Lasith Malinga 7/49 (9.5 overs)

Galle won by 156 runs
Pallekele International Cricket Stadium, Pallekele
Umpires: Ranmore Martinesz and Raveendra Wimalasiri

- Kandy won the toss and elected to field.

6 April 2019
Scorecard

Galle; 345/8 (50 overs)	v	Dambulla; 269 (46.5 overs)
Dhananjaya de Silva 89 (76); Ishan Jayaratne 3/43 (8 overs)		Angelo Mathews 78 (64); Dhananjaya de Silva 3/57 (9 overs)

Galle won by 76 runs
Rangiri Dambulla International Stadium, Dambulla
Umpires: Lyndon Hannibal and Ruchira Palliyaguruge

- Dambulla won the toss and elected to field.

6 April 2019
Scorecard

Colombo; 289/6 (50 overs)	v	Kandy; 205/5 (39 overs)
Shehan Jayasuriya 115 (133); Kasun Rajitha 2/74 (9 overs)		Sangeeth Cooray 82 (100); Seekkuge Prasanna 2/55 (9 overs)

Colombo won by 3 runs (D/L method)
Pallekele International Cricket Stadium, Pallekele
Umpires: Ranmore Martinesz and Raveendra Wimalasiri

- Colombo won the toss and elected to bat.

8 April 2019
Scorecard

Dambulla; 198 (44.5 overs)	v	Kandy; 199/3 (31.3 overs)
Angelo Mathews 47 (67); Thisara Perera 4/25 (7 overs)		Dimuth Karunaratne 86 (74); Ramith Rambukwella 1/31 (5 overs)

Kandy won by 7 wickets
Rangiri Dambulla International Stadium, Dambulla
Umpires: Prageeth Rambukwella and Ruchira Palliyaguruge

- Dambulla won the toss and elected to bat.

8 April 2019
Scorecard

Galle; 258/9 (50 overs)	v	Colombo; 55/0 (7.1 overs)
Wanindu Hasaranga 56 (60); Akila Dananjaya 5/53 (10 overs)		Avishka Fernando 27* (24)

No result
Pallekele International Cricket Stadium, Pallekele
Umpires: Raveendra Wimalasiri and Pradeep Udawatta

- Galle won the toss and elected to bat.
- Rain during Colombo's innings prevented any further play.

=== Finals ===
3rd place play-off
10 April 2019
Scorecard

Dambulla; 325/5 (50 overs)	v	Kandy; 231 (42.2 overs)
Angelo Mathews 101 (106); Thisara Perera 2/54 (10 overs)		Sadeera Samarawickrama 70 (66); Isuru Udana 2/21 (5 overs)

Dambulla won by 94 runs
Rangiri Dambulla International Stadium, Dambulla
Umpires: Raveendra Wimalasiri and Lyndon Hannibal

- Kandy won the toss and elected to field.

Final
11 April 2019
Scorecard

Galle; 337/7 (50 overs)	v	Colombo
Lahiru Thirimanne 115 (128); Seekkuge Prasanna 1/41 (4 overs)

No result
Rangiri Dambulla International Stadium, Dambulla
Umpires: Lyndon Hannibal and Ruchira Palliyaguruge

- Galle won the toss and elected to bat.
- Rain during the innings break prevented any further play, with the title being shared.
