= Sagar Udeshi =

Indian cricketer (born 1986)

Personal information
- Full name: Sagar Paresh Udeshi
- Born: 14 October 1986 (age 40); Mumbai, Maharashtra, India
- Source: ESPNcricinfo, 19 September 2018

Sagar Paresh Udeshi (born 14 October 1986) is an Indian cricketer. He made his first-class debut for Chilaw Marians Cricket Club in the 2018–19 Premier League Tournament in Sri Lanka on 14 December 2018. He was the leading wicket-taker for Chilaw Marians Cricket Club in the tournament, with 57 dismissals in eight matches.

He made his List A debut for Puducherry in the 2018–19 Vijay Hazare Trophy on 19 September 2018. He made his Twenty20 debut on 8 November 2019, for Puducherry in the 2019–20 Syed Mushtaq Ali Trophy.
