= Lakshan =

Lakshan (Devanagari: लक्षण lakṣaṇa) is a South Asian masculine given name. Some of the meanings of the Sanskrit word lakṣaṇa are "mark, sign", "aim, goal", "lucky mark". A related feminine given name is Lakshanya.

== Athletes ==
- Lakshan Jayasinghe (born 1995), Sri Lankan cricketer
- Lakshan Madushanka (born 1990), Sri Lankan cricketer
- Lakshan Rodrigo (born 1987), Sri Lankan cricketer
- Lakshan Sandakan (born 1991), Sri Lankan cricketer
- Lakshan Somaweera (born 1996), Sri Lankan cricketer

== Fictional characters ==
- Lakṣaṇa, a character from the Rajatarangini chronicle
