= Oshada Fernando =

Sri Lankan cricketer (born 1992)

Personal information
- Full name: Bodiyabaduge Oshada Piyumal Fernando
- Born: 15 April 1992 (age 34); Colombo, Sri Lanka
- Height: 5 ft 11 in (180 cm)
- Batting: Right-handed
- Bowling: Right-arm leg break
- Role: Top-order batter

International information
- National side: Sri Lanka (2019-present)
- Test debut (cap 150): 13 February 2019 v South Africa
- Last Test: 29 January 2025 v Australia
- ODI debut (cap 189): 3 March 2019 v South Africa
- Last ODI: 4 July 2021 v England
- T20I debut (cap 84): 9 October 2019 v Pakistan
- Last T20I: 26 June 2021 v England

Career statistics
| Competition | Test | ODI | T20I | FC |
|---|---|---|---|---|
| Matches | 22 | 8 | 7 | 141 |
| Runs scored | 1104 | 148 | 128 | 9493 |
| Batting average | 31.54 | 18.50 | 25.60 | 42.00 |
| 100s/50s | 1/7 | 0/0 | 0/1 | 24/49 |
| Top score | 102 | 49 | 78* | 234 |
| Catches/stumpings | 14/– | 1/– | 0/– | 90/0 |
- Source: Cricinfo, 11 March 2025

Bodiyabaduge Oshada Piyumal Fernando, commonly as Oshada Fernando (born 15 April 1992), is a professional Sri Lankan cricketer who plays all formats of the game. He plays for Chilaw Marians Cricket Club in domestic cricket, and he made his international debut for the Sri Lanka cricket team in February 2019. He has his education at Sri Sumangala College, Panadura and St. Sebastian's College, Moratuwa.

== Domestic career ==
He made his first-class debut for Colts Cricket Club in the 2010–11 Premier Trophy on 1 April 2011.

In March 2018, he was named in Galle's squad for the 2017–18 Super Four Provincial Tournament. In August 2018, he was named in Galle's squad the 2018–19 SLC Twenty20 Tournament. He was the leading run-scorer in the 2018–19 Premier League Tournament, with 1,181 runs in nine matches, including six centuries.

In March 2019, he was named in Dambulla's squad for the 2019 Super Provincial One Day Tournament. In October 2020, he was drafted by the Dambulla Viiking for the inaugural edition of the Lanka Premier League. In August 2021, he was named in the SLC Reds team for the 2021 SLC Invitational T20 League tournament.

== International career ==
In February 2019, he was named in Sri Lanka's Test squad for their series against South Africa. He made his Test debut for Sri Lanka against South Africa on 13 February 2019. During the second match at Port Elizabeth, Fernando scored his maiden test fifty. Along with Kusal Mendis, they put an unbeaten match winning partnership of 163 runs off 213 balls to win the match by 8 wickets. He hit 75 not out in 106 balls and Mendis scored 84 off 110 balls. With that win, Sri Lanka won the series 2-0. It was the first Test series win by Sri Lanka in South Africa.

Later the same month, he was named in Sri Lanka's One Day International (ODI) squad, also for the series against South Africa. He made his ODI debut for Sri Lanka against South Africa on 3 March 2019. In September 2019, he was named in Sri Lanka's Twenty20 International (T20I) squad for their series against Pakistan. He made his T20I debut for Sri Lanka, against Pakistan, on 9 October 2019. In the match he scored match winning unbeaten 78 runs, where Sri Lanka won the match by 13 runs and whitewashed Pakistan 3-0. Fernando's score of 78 was the highest score by a batsman for Sri Lanka on debut, and the first fifty scored by a Sri Lankan on debut in a T20I match. In December 2019, also against Pakistan, Fernando scored his first century in Test cricket.

In June 2022, he was named in the Sri Lanka A squad for their matches against Australia A during Australia's tour of Sri Lanka. During the Test match series against Australia, Fernando became a COVID-19 substitute in both matches. In the first match he replaced Angelo Mathews, and in the second match he replaced Pathum Nissanka.
