= Selvarajh Mathushan =

Sri Lankan cricketer (born 1996)

Selvarasa Mathushan
Personal information
- Born: 8 October 1996 (age 30)
- Source: Cricinfo, 20 January 2019

Selvarasa Mathushan (born 10 August 1996) is a Sri Lankan cricketer. He made his first-class debut for Tamil Union Cricket and Athletic Club in the 2018–19 Premier League Tournament on 17 January 2019.
