= Buddika Madushanka =

Sri Lankan cricketer (born 1992)

Personal information
- Full name: Algewattha Buddhika Madushanka
- Born: 3 October 1992 (age 34); Mahamodara, Sri Lanka
- Batting: Right-handed
- Bowling: Right-arm medium-fast
- Source: ESPNcricinfo, 9 December 2018

Buddika Madushanka (born 3 October 1992) is a Sri Lankan cricketer. He made his Twenty20 debut for Sri Lanka Army Sports Club in the 2017–18 SLC Twenty20 Tournament on 24 February 2018. He made his List A debut for Sri Lanka Army Sports Club in the 2017–18 Premier Limited Overs Tournament on 12 March 2018. He made his first-class debut for Sri Lanka Army Sports Club in the 2018–19 Premier League Tournament on 7 December 2016.
