= Dushan Vimukthi =

Sri Lankan cricketer (born 1991)

Personal information
- Full name: Kirahandige Dushan Vimukthi Wimalasekera
- Born: 9 December 1991 (age 34); Panadura, Sri Lanka
- Source: ESPNcricinfo, 10 December 2016

Kirahandige Dushan Vimukthi Wimalasekera (born 9 December 1991) is a Sri Lankan cricketer. He made his first-class debut for Sri Lanka Air Force Sports Club in the 2013–14 Premier Trophy on 17 January 2014. He was the leading run-scorer for Sri Lanka Army Sports Club in the 2018–19 Premier League Tournament, with 889 runs in ten matches. He was also the team's leading wicket-taker in the tournament, with 39 dismissals.
