= Kosala Kuruppuarachchi =

Sri Lankan cricketer (born 1964)

Personal information
- Full name: Ajith Kosala Kuruppuarachchi
- Born: 1 November 1964 (age 62); Colombo, Sri Lanka
- Batting: Right-handed
- Bowling: Left-arm fast-medium

International information
- National side: Sri Lanka (1986–1987)
- Test debut (cap 35): 14 March 1986 v Pakistan
- Last Test: 16 April 1987 v New Zealand

Career statistics
Competition	Test	First-class
Matches	2	29
Runs scored	–	70
Batting average	–	5.83
100s/50s	–	0/0
Top score	–	20*
Balls bowled	272	3,310
Wickets	8	60
Bowling average	18.62	26.69
5 wickets in innings	1	2
10 wickets in match	0	0
Best bowling	5/44	5/44
Catches/stumpings	0/–	5/–
- Source: Cricinfo, 24 May 2023

Ajith Kosala Kuruppuarachchi (born 1 November 1964) is a Sri Lankan Australian former cricketer who played in two Test matches from 1986 to 1987. He was born at Colombo in 1964.

On his debut on 14 March 1986, he took five wickets in the first innings against Pakistan in Colombo, including a wicket with his third delivery. With that, Sri Lanka beat Pakistan in a Test for the first time, where Kuruppuarachchi took a major part in both bat and ball.

== Sources ==
- Hook, R. (1987) "Sri Lanka Profiles", Australian Cricket 1987-88 Guide, ed. Mengel, N.
