= Amila Aponso =

Sri Lankan cricketer (born 1993)

Personal information
- Full name: Malmeege Amila Aponso
- Born: 23 June 1993 (age 33); Colombo, Sri Lanka
- Nickname: Amiya
- Batting: Right-handed
- Bowling: Slow left-arm orthodox
- Role: Bowler

International information
- National side: Sri Lanka (2016–2018)
- ODI debut (cap 173): 21 August 2016 v Australia
- Last ODI: 20 October 2018 v England
- ODI shirt no.: 32
- T20I debut (cap 76): 18 February 2018 v Bangladesh
- Last T20I: 27 October 2018 v England

Domestic team information
- Years: Team
- 2015–present: Ragama Cricket Club
- 2016: Sri Lanka Emerging Team
- 2020: Colombo Kings
- 2024-present: Washington Freedom

Career statistics
Competition	ODI	T20I	FC	LA
Matches	9	3	43	39
Runs scored	10	0	506	106
Batting average	3.33	0.00	12.04	8.15
100s/50s	0/0	0/0	0/2	0/0
Top score	4	0	68	36
Balls bowled	423	60	7,097	1,862
Wickets	10	4	193	56
Bowling average	37.70	19.75	21.22	22.07
5 wickets in innings	0	0	10	0
10 wickets in match	0	0	2	0
Best bowling	4/18	2/29	7/71	4/18
Catches/stumpings	0/–	0/–	19/–	8/–
- Source: Cricinfo, 29 October 2018

Malmeege Amila Aponso, or Amila Aponso (born 23 June 1993) is a professional Sri Lankan cricketer, who played for the Sri Lanka cricket team. He played first-class cricket for Ragama Cricket Club. He is a past pupil of St. Sebastian's College, Moratuwa. In June 2021, Aponso moved to the United States to play in the Minor League Cricket tournament. In 2024, he was picked to play for Washington Freedom in the MLC, and went on to win the tournament that year.

== Domestic career ==
In April 2018, he was named in Dambulla's squad for the 2018 Super Provincial One Day Tournament. In August 2018, he was named in Dambulla's squad the 2018 SLC T20 League.

He was the leading wicket-taker for Ragama Cricket Club in the 2018–19 Premier League Tournament, with 47 dismissals in nine matches. In October 2020, he was drafted by the Colombo Kings for the inaugural edition of the Lanka Premier League.

== International career ==
Aponso took 31 first-class wickets at an average of 20.9 in the 2015 season, and was rewarded with a place in the Sri Lanka A squad to New Zealand, later that year. After series of good performances in domestic arena in 2015 and 2016, he had to wait until Sri Lanka's main spinner Rangana Herath retired from limited-overs cricket.

In August 2016 he was added to Sri Lanka's squad for their One Day International (ODI) series against Australia. He made his ODI debut for Sri Lanka against Australia on 21 August 2016. He took his first international wicket by dismissing Aaron Finch. Sri Lanka lost the match by 3 wickets, but commentators praised the bowling performances of Aponso.

He was part of the Sri Lankan team that won the ACC Emerging Teams Asia Cup 2017 by defeating Pakistan in the final. He was the top wicket-taker for Sri Lanka in that tournament with 12 dismissals.

In February 2018, he was named in Sri Lanka's Twenty20 International (T20I) squad for their series against Bangladesh. He made his T20I debut for Sri Lanka against Bangladesh on 18 February 2018. He took his first T20I wicket by dismissing Tamim Iqbal.

In May 2018, he was one of 33 cricketers to be awarded a national contract by Sri Lanka Cricket ahead of the 2018–19 season. In November 2019, he was named in Sri Lanka's squad for the 2019 ACC Emerging Teams Asia Cup in Bangladesh.
