= Supeshala Jayathilake =

Sri Lankan cricketer (born 1995)

Personal information
- Born: 3 April 1995 (age 31)
- Source: Cricinfo, 14 March 2018

Supeshala Jayathilake (born 3 April 1995) is a Sri Lankan cricketer. He made his first-class debut for Sri Lanka Navy Sports Club in the 2012–13 Premier Trophy on 1 March 2013.
