= Hareen Buddila =

Sri Lankan cricketer (born 1999)

Personal information
- Full name: Paththiniwasam Hareen Buddila Weerasingha
- Born: 6 February 1999 (age 27); Ambalangoda, Sri Lanka
- Source: Cricinfo, 24 February 2018

Hareen Buddila (born 6 February 1999) is a Sri Lankan cricketer. He made his first-class debut for Galle Cricket Club in Tier B of the 2017–18 Premier League Tournament on 16 February 2018. He made his Twenty20 debut for Galle Cricket Club in the 2017–18 SLC Twenty20 Tournament on 24 February 2018. He made his List A debut for Galle Cricket Club in the 2017–18 Premier Limited Overs Tournament on 14 March 2018.
