= Prasansana Jayamanne =

Sri Lankan cricketer (born 1994)

Personal information
- Full name: Jayamanne Mohottige Don Bernard Madushan Prasansana Jayamanne
- Born: 17 September 1994 (age 32); Negombo, Sri Lanka
- Source: Cricinfo, 24 February 2018

Prasansana Jayamanne (born 17 September 1994) is a Sri Lankan cricketer. He made his Twenty20 debut for Negombo Cricket Club in the 2017–18 SLC Twenty20 Tournament on 24 February 2018. He made his List A debut for Negombo Cricket Club in the 2017–18 Premier Limited Overs Tournament on 10 March 2018. He was the leading run-scorer for Negombo Cricket Club in the 2018–19 Premier League Tournament, with 648 runs in seven matches.
