= List of Sri Lanka cricketers who have taken five-wicket hauls on Test debut =

In cricket, a five-wicket haul (also known as a "five–for" or "fifer") refers to a bowler taking five or more wickets in a single innings. A five-wicket haul on debut is regarded by critics as a notable achievement. As of November 2026, 181 cricketers have taken a five-wicket haul on Test match debut, of which six are from Sri Lanka: Kosala Kuruppuarachchi, Upul Chandana, Akila Dananjaya, Lasith Embuldeniya, Praveen Jayawickrama, Prabath Jayasuriya and Nishan Peiris. Kuruppuarachchi and Chandana achieved the feat against Pakistan; Dananjaya and Jayawickrama achieved the feat against Bangladesh; Embuldeniya achieved his feat against South Africa, Jayasuriya against Australia, and Peiris against New Zealand.

Chandana is the only Sri Lankan to get a five-wicket haul in a losing cause, during the 1998–99 Asian Test Championship at Bangabandhu National Stadium, Dhaka. Jayawickrama and Jayasuriya both went on to take fifers in the second innings.

== Key ==
- Date – Starting date of the Test match
- Overs – Number of overs bowled in that innings
- Runs – Runs conceded
- Wkts – Number of wickets taken
- Batsmen – The batsmen whose wickets were taken in the five-wicket haul.
- Econ – Bowling economy rate (average runs per over)
- Inn – The innings of the match in which the five-wicket haul was taken.
- Result – The result for the India team in that match.
- ♠ – The bowler was selected "Man of the match".
- * – 10 wickets or more taken in the match.

== Five-wicket hauls ==
No.	Bowler	Date	Ground	Against	Inn	Overs	Runs	Wkts	Econ	Batsmen	Result
1	Kosala Kuruppuarachchi	14 March 1986	Colombo Cricket Club Ground, Colombo	Pakistan	1	14.5	44	5	2.96	Mudassar Nazar; Mohsin Khan; Saleem Malik; Wasim Akram; Zulqarnain	Won
2	Upul Chandana	12 March 1999	Bangabandhu National Stadium, Dhaka	Pakistan	2	47.5	179	6	3.74	Ijaz Ahmed; Yousuf Youhana; Shahid Afridi; Wasim Akram; Arshad Khan; Shoaib Akhtar	Lost
3	Akila Dananjaya	10 February 2018	Sher-e-Bangla National Cricket Stadium, Dhaka	Bangladesh	4	5	24	5	4.80	Liton Das; Mahmudullah; Sabbir Rahman; Mehidy Hasan; Abdur Razzak	Won
4	Lasith Embuldeniya	15 February 2019	Kingsmead Cricket Ground, Durban	South Africa	3	26	66	5	2.53	Dean Elgar; Temba Bavuma; Quinton de Kock; Vernon Philander; Kagiso Rabada	Won
5	Praveen Jayawickrama*♠	29 April 2021	Pallekele International Cricket Stadium, Kandy	Bangladesh	3	32	92	6	2.87	Saif Hassan; Tamim Iqbal; Mushfiqur Rahim; Liton Das; Mehidy Hasan; Taskin Ahmed	Won
6	Prabath Jayasuriya*♠	8 July 2022	Galle International Stadium, Galle	Australia	1	36	118	6	3.27	Marnus Labuschagne; Travis Head; Cameron Green; Alex Carey; Mitchell Starc; Nathan Lyon	Won
7	Nishan Peiris	26 September 2024	Galle International Stadium, Galle	New Zealand	3	33.4	170	6	5.04	Tom Latham; Kane Williamson; Rachin Ravindra; Tom Blundell; Glenn Phillips; Mitchell Santner	Won
