= Gamindu Kanishka =

Sri Lankan cricketer (born 1987)

Personal information
- Full name: Gamindu Kanishka Amarasinghe
- Born: 27 January 1987 (age 39); Ratnapura, Sri Lanka
- Source: ESPNcricinfo, 29 January 2017

Gamindu Kanishka (born 27 January 1987) is a Sri Lankan cricketer. He made his first-class debut for Saracens Sports Club in the 2007–08 Premier Trophy on 18 January 2008.
