= Subramanian Anand =

Indian cricketer (born 1986)

Subramanian Anand (born 14 January 1986) is an Indian cricketer. He is a right-handed batsman and leg-break bowler who played for Badureliya Sports Club in Sri Lanka. Anand made his cricketing debut for Badureliya Sports Club in a List A match against Saracens Sports Club, picking up four wickets on debut. Anand's first-class debut came in October 2009, against Nondescripts Cricket Club, in an innings defeat which saw him score 24 runs in the first innings and a duck in the second.

He started playing for Puducherry cricket team in India from the 2019-20 domestic cricket season. He made his Twenty20 debut on 9 November 2019, for Meghalaya in the 2019–20 Syed Mushtaq Ali Trophy.

He was born in Chennai.
