= Salinda Ushan =

Sri Lankan cricketer (born 1997)

Personal information
- Full name: Maddumage Salinda Ushan Pereira
- Born: 2 January 1997 (age 29); Dehiwala, Sri Lanka
- Batting: Left-handed
- Bowling: Right-arm offbreak
- Source: ESPNcricinfo, 6 January 2017

Salinda Ushan (born 2 January 1997) is a Sri Lankan cricketer. He made his first-class debut for Colts Cricket Club in the 2016–17 Premier League Tournament on 6 January 2017. Prior to his debut, he was named in Sri Lanka's squad for the 2016 Under-19 Cricket World Cup.

He made his List A debut for Kegalle District in the 2016–17 Districts One Day Tournament on 23 March 2017. He made his Twenty20 debut for Badureliya Sports Club in the 2017–18 SLC Twenty20 Tournament on 24 February 2018. He was the leading run-scorer for Badureliya Sports Club in the 2018–19 Premier League Tournament, with 574 runs in nine matches.
