= Manuran de Silva =

Sri Lankan cricketer (born 1992)

Personal information
- Full name: Wedikkara Shehan Manuran de Silva
- Born: 30 October 1992 (age 34)
- Source: Cricinfo, 31 May 2021

Manuran de Silva (born 30 October 1992) is a Sri Lankan cricketer. He made his first-class debut for Nondescripts Cricket Club in the 2018–19 Premier League Tournament on 24 January 2019.
