= Southern Express =

- Founded: 2009
- Headquarters: 2531 Schieffelin Rd, Apex, NC
- Locale: Southeastern United States
- Service area: North Carolina
- Service type: Bus Charter; Airport Shuttle; Motorcoach Tours; Contract Operations
- Chief executive: R. Vance Hoover

Southern Express is an American transportation company dealing with charter bus services and related passenger transportation services. Based in the Raleigh/Durham area of North Carolina, the company was founded in 2009 by Bruce Bechard and Vance Hoover.

== Cities served ==
Main cities and towns served are:

- Raleigh, North Carolina
- Durham, North Carolina
- Chapel Hill, North Carolina
- Research Triangle Park, North Carolina
- Apex, North Carolina
- Cary, North Carolina
- Fayetteville, North Carolina
- Greensboro, North Carolina
- Rocky Mount, North Carolina
- Wake Forest, North Carolina
- Wilson, North Carolina

== Airports served ==
Main airports served are:

- Raleigh-Durham International Airport
- Fayetteville Regional Airport
- Albert J. Ellis Airport
- Piedmont Triad International Airport
- Charlotte/Douglas International Airport
