= Priyamal Perera =

Sri Lankan cricketer

Personal information
- Born: 2 May 1995 (age 31); Ragama, Sri Lanka
- Batting: Right-handed
- Role: Batsman

International information
- National side: Sri Lanka
- ODI debut (cap 191): 13 March 2019 v South Africa
- Last ODI: 16 March 2019 v South Africa

Career statistics
Competition	ODI	FC	LA	T20
Matches	2	42	29	28
Runs scored	33	2,768	552	407
Batting average	16.50	45.37	30.66	22.61
100s/50s	0/0	4/17	1/2	0/1
Top score	33	206*	102*	63
Balls bowled	–	426	114	6
Wickets	–	10	1	1
Bowling average	–	23.70	94.00	9.00
5 wickets in innings	–	0	0	0
10 wickets in match	–	0	0	0
Best bowling	–	2/14	1/10	1/9
Catches/stumpings	1/–	34/–	10/–	10/–
- Source: ESPNcricinfo, 16 March 2019

Priyamal Perera (born 2 May 1995) is a professional Sri Lankan cricketer. He was part of Sri Lanka's squad for the 2014 ICC Under-19 Cricket World Cup and made his international debut for the Sri Lanka cricket team in March 2019.

== Domestic career ==
In March 2018, he was named in Kandy's squad for the 2017–18 Super Four Provincial Tournament. The following month, he was also named in Kandy's squad for the 2018 Super Provincial One Day Tournament. In August 2018, he was named in Colombo's squad the 2018 SLC T20 League. He was the leading run-scorer for Colts Cricket Club in the 2018–19 Premier League Tournament, with 1,001 runs in ten matches.

In March 2019, he was named in Kandy's squad for the 2019 Super Provincial One Day Tournament. In October 2020, he was drafted by the Kandy Tuskers for the inaugural edition of the Lanka Premier League.

== International career ==
In February 2019, he was named in Sri Lanka's One Day International (ODI) squad for their series against South Africa. He made his ODI debut for Sri Lanka against South Africa on 13 March 2019.
