= Dilesh Gunaratne =

Sri Lankan cricketer (born 1989)

Dilesh Gunaratne (born 2 April 1989) is a Sri Lankan cricketer who plays for Colombo Cricket Club. He has made more than 50 first-class appearances since 2011. He Completed his studies at Mahanama College.

Gunaratne made his List A debut in the 2009–10 season, against Sinhalese Sports Club. From the tailend, he scored a duck. Gunaratne took figures of 0-41 from 6.3 overs of bowling.

In August 2018, he was named in Dambulla's squad the 2018 SLC T20 League. In March 2019, he was named in Kandy's squad for the 2019 Super Provincial One Day Tournament.
