= Malinda Pushpakumara =

Sri Lankan cricketer (born 1987)

Personal information
- Full name: Pawuluge Malinda Pushpakumara
- Born: 24 March 1987 (age 39); Colombo, Sri Lanka
- Height: 5 ft 7 in (170 cm)
- Batting: Right-handed
- Bowling: Slow left-arm orthodox
- Role: Bowler

International information
- National side: Sri Lanka (2017–2018)
- Test debut (cap 141): 3 August 2017 v India
- Last Test: 23 November 2018 v England
- ODI debut (cap 184): 31 August 2017 v India
- Last ODI: 3 September 2017 v India

Domestic team information
- Years: Team
- 2008–2010: Moors Sports Club
- 2012–2015: Saracens Sports Club
- 2015–present: Chilaw Marians Cricket Club
- 2020: Dambulla Viiking
- 2022: Chattogram Challengers

Career statistics
Competition	Test	ODI	FC	LA
Matches	4	2	150	104
Runs scored	102	11	2,289	440
Batting average	17.00	5.50	13.78	10.00
100s/50s	0/0	0/0	0/4	0/0
Top score	42*	8	80*	29
Balls bowled	860	114	33,201	4,927
Wickets	14	1	863	175
Bowling average	37.14	105.00	20.09	18.71
5 wickets in innings	0	0	72	5
10 wickets in match	0	0	24	0
Best bowling	3/28	1/40	10/37	5/24
Catches/stumpings	2/–	2/–	140/–	36/–
- Source: Cricinfo, 28 December 2022

Pawuluge Malinda Pushpakumara, commonly as Malinda Pushpakumara (born 24 March 1987) is a professional Sri Lankan cricketer who has played for the national team in Tests and ODIs. He plays for Colombo Cricket Club in first-class cricket. In January 2019, he took all ten wickets in an innings in a first-class cricket match.

== Domestic career ==
He took the most wickets in the 2016–17 Premier League Tournament, with a total of 77 dismissals from 9 matches and 18 innings.

In November 2017, he was named the best bowler in domestic cricket for the 2016–17 season at Sri Lanka Cricket's annual awards.

He also took the most wickets in the 2017–18 Premier League Tournament, with a total of 70 dismissals from 10 matches and 20 innings. In March 2018, he was named in Galle's squad for the 2017–18 Super Four Provincial Tournament. The following month, he was also named in Galle's squad for the 2018 Super Provincial One Day Tournament. He was the leading wicket-taker for the tournament, with fifteen dismissals in six matches.

In August 2018, he was named in Kandy's squad for the 2018 SLC T20 League.

In January 2019, during the round six match between Colombo Cricket Club and Saracens Sports Club in the 2018–19 Premier League Tournament, Pushpakumara took all ten wickets in the second innings of the match. It was the first ten-wicket haul in an innings in first-class cricket since 2009, and the best figures since 1995. In the same match, he also took his 700th first-class wicket and became the second Sri Lankan bowler to take all ten wickets in an innings. He finished the tournament as the leading wicket-taker, with 63 dismissals in nine matches, which included seven five-wicket hauls.

In March 2019, he was named in Kandy's squad for the 2019 Super Provincial One Day Tournament. In January 2020, he was the leading wicket-taker in the 2019–20 SLC Twenty20 Tournament, with eighteen dismissals in nine matches. In October 2020, he was drafted by the Dambulla Viiking for the inaugural edition of the Lanka Premier League.

In July 2022, he was signed by the Kandy Falcons for the third edition of the Lanka Premier League.

== International career ==
In February 2017, he was named in Sri Lanka's Test squad for their series against Bangladesh, although he did not play.

In July 2017, he was named in Sri Lanka's Test squad for their series against India. He made his Test debut for Sri Lanka against India on 3 August 2017. He had to bowl 20 overs for the maiden wicket, when he stumped Ajinkya Rahane. However, his bowling figures of the match was 2 for 156 runs, where India recorded 619 for the first innings. Pushpakumara played as the night-watchman in the second innings, where he scored 16 runs. However, Sri Lanka lost the match by an innings and 53 runs at the end.

The following month, he was named in Sri Lanka's One Day International (ODI) squad for their series against India. He made his ODI debut on 31 August 2017 against India. He gave away 65 runs without taking a wicket and only scored 3 runs.

In May 2018, he was one of 33 cricketers to be awarded a national contract by Sri Lanka Cricket ahead of the 2018–19 season.
