= 1938 County Championship =

English cricket tournament

- Cricket format: First-class cricket
- Tournament format: League system
- Champions: Yorkshire (20th title)

The 1938 County Championship was the 45th officially organised running of the County Championship. Yorkshire County Cricket Club won their 20th championship title.

The points system for the Championship was altered as follows -

- 12 pts for a win
- 6 pts for a tie
- 4 pts for a first innings lead in a match either drawn or lost
- 8 pts for a win in a match under one day rules

== Table ==
County Championship table
Team	Pld	W	L	D	1st Inns Loss	1st Inns Draw	Pts	Average
Yorkshire	28	20	2	6	0	4	256	9.14
Middlesex	22	15	5	2	0	1	184	8.36
Surrey	25	12	6	7	2	5	172	6.88
Lancashire	28	14	6	8	0	6	192	6.85
Derbyshire	25	11	8	6	3	4	160	6.40
Essex	26	12	11	3	3	2	164	6.30
Somerset	25	10	9	6	1	5	144	5.76
Sussex	29	11	9	9	3	3	156	5.37
Kent	27	8	14	5	2	4	120	4.44
Gloucestershire	28	8	13	7	2	4	122*	4.35
Worcestershire	30	9	11	10	2	3	128	4.26
Nottinghamshire	25	7	10	8	2	3	106*	4.24
Warwickshire	22	7	7	8	0	2	92	4.18
Hampshire	30	9	16	5	4	0	124	4.13
Leicestershire	22	4	9	9	1	7	80	3.63
Glamorgan	22	5	9	8	1	3	76	3.45
Northamptonshire	24	0	17	7	3	1	16	0.66

- includes 2 pts for a tie on first innings of a lost match
