= Akila Dananjaya =

Sri Lankan cricketer (born 1993)

Personal information
- Full name: Mahamarakkala Kurukulasooriya Patabendige Akila Dananjaya Perera
- Born: 4 October 1993 (age 33); Panadura, Sri Lanka
- Height: 5 ft 7 in (1.70 m)
- Batting: Left-handed
- Bowling: Right-arm off break Right-arm leg break
- Role: Bowling All-rounder

International information
- National side: Sri Lanka (2012–present)
- Test debut (cap 145): 8 February 2018 v Bangladesh
- Last Test: 14 August 2019 v New Zealand
- ODI debut (cap 154): 12 November 2012 v New Zealand
- Last ODI: 4 August 2024 v Sri Lanka
- T20I debut (cap 47): 27 September 2012 v New Zealand
- Last T20I: 4 March 2024 v Bangladesh

Domestic team information
- Years: Team
- 2012: Wayamba United
- 2013/14-present: Colts Cricket Club
- 2017/18: Khulna Titans
- 2018: Mumbai Indians
- 2020/21: Galle Gladiators
- 2026: Dambulla Sixers

Career statistics
Competition	Test	ODI	T20I	FC
Matches	6	42	33	83
Runs scored	135	323	65	1,459
Batting average	16.87	12.42	8.12	19.45
100s/50s	0/0	0/1	0/0	0/5
Top score	43*	50*	11*	92
Balls bowled	1,385	2,115	701	14,427
Wickets	33	59	30	343
Bowling average	24.81	30.66	32.16	28.22
5 wickets in innings	4	2	0	24
10 wickets in match	0	0	0	5
Best bowling	6/115	6/29	3/36	9/56
Catches/stumpings	1/–	14/-	7/-	30/–
- Source: ESPNcricinfo, 21 March 2025

Mahamarakkala Kurukulasooriya Patabendige Akila Dananjaya Perera (Sinhala: අකිල ධනංජය; born 4 October 1993), popularly known as Akila Dananjaya, is a professional Sri Lankan cricketer, who played all forms of the game for the national team. In March 2021, he became the first bowler to take hat-trick and be hit for the maximum of six sixes in an over in the same match, by Kieron Pollard against West Indies .

In December 2018, he was suspended from bowling in international matches after his bowling action was deemed to be illegal, which was later corrected to play in March 2019. However, in September 2019, the International Cricket Council (ICC) suspended Dananjaya from bowling in international matches for twelve months after his bowling action was once again deemed to be illegal, a penalty received for failing a biomechanics assessment twice within a two-year period. He was cleared to bowl in international cricket again on 8 January 2021.

== Personal life ==
The son of a carpenter from Moratuwa, Dananjaya studied at Moratuwa Maha Vidyalaya Panadura Mahanama Navodya Vidyalaya, Panadura. He married his longtime partner Nethalie Tekshini on 22 August 2017 just two days before his recall to the ODI team for second ODI against India. The wedding was celebrated at Ramadia Ran Mal Holiday Resort, Moratuwa and two spinners Rangana Herath and Ajantha Mendis signed as witnesses.

== Domestic career ==
He was selected to play for Wayamba United in the inaugural Sri Lanka Premier League. In only his second match for the franchise, he took 3–18 against Nagenahira Nagas, consistently disturbing the batsmen with his flight, googly and other variations.

In the 2013 IPL auctions, Dananjaya was sold to the Chennai Super Kings for his base price of $20,000. In January 2018, he was bought by the Mumbai Indians in the 2018 IPL auction.

In March 2018, he was named in Galle's squad for the 2017–18 Super Four Provincial Tournament. In August 2018, he was named in Colombo's squad the 2018 SLC T20 League. In March 2019, he was named in Colombo's squad for the 2019 Super Provincial One Day Tournament. In October 2020, he was drafted by the Galle Gladiators for the inaugural edition of the Lanka Premier League. In August 2021, he was named in the SLC Reds team for the 2021 SLC Invitational T20 League tournament.

== International career ==
=== Early beginning ===
Officially a left-hand batsman and an off-break bowler, he is said to have seven variations, including the leg-break, googly, carrom ball, doosra and his stock off-spinner that had impressed national team captain Mahela Jayawardene so much in the nets as to make Jayawardene request him to be fast-tracked into the national squad. Dhananjaya had at that point played no first-class, List A, T20 or even U-19 cricket. This in turn led to controversy as his selection was questioned by the media on the basis of a net performance.

This in turn led to a place in the final squad for the 2012 ICC World Twenty20. He made his debut international appearance at the age of 18 against New Zealand at Pallekele in a pool match of World Twenty20.

He was hit on the face by a full-blooded drive from New Zealand opener Rob Nicol, with the ball going through his hands to strike the left side of his face. X-rays and MRI scans revealed that he had suffered a fracture on his left cheek bone as a result of the blow and did not play in the pool match against West Indies.

=== Recall after 5 years ===
Dananjaya was recalled in to the ODI squad after five years for the Zimbabwe tour in 2017. In the first match of the series, he took his maiden ODI wicket by dismissing Craig Ervine. He took his maiden ODI five-wicket haul on 24 August 2017 against India at Pallekele Cricket Stadium. His fifer took in the space of 13 deliveries, which is the best for a Sri Lankan in ODIs as well. He bewildered the Indian batsmen. However, India won the match by 3 wickets at the end and Dananjaya's bowling figures of 6 for 54 stands as the best bowling figures by a Sri Lankan in a losing cause. Despite the loss, he awarded man of the match for impressive bowling performance.

On 13 October 2017 against Pakistan, Dananjaya scored his maiden ODI fifty. His score of an unbeaten 50 off 72 balls did not help Sri Lanka to win the match, but helped to reach 200 mark in total.

=== As strike bowler ===
In 2018, Dhananjaya was named to Sri Lanka's Test squad for the tour of Bangladesh. He made his Test debut on 8 February 2018 against Bangladesh in the second Test at Sher-e-Bangla Cricket Stadium. He took his first test wicket of Mahmudullah in the Bangladesh's first innings and claimed two more wickets to restrict Bangladesh to 110 by finishing with decent figures of 3/20. In the second innings, Dananjaya took his maiden Test five-wicket haul by taking 5 for 24 runs, becoming only the 3rd Sri Lankan to take a fifer on his test debut and the first instance for Sri Lanka since 1999. With 8 wickets for 44 runs in the match, Dananjaya's bowling figures recorded as the best bowling figures by a Sri Lankan in debut match and only the 2nd Sri Lankan to grab 8 wickets on debut, beating Ajantha Mendis' figures of 8/144. Dananjaya's record breaking figures of 8/44 on his Test debut is regarded as one of the most economical cheapest bowling figures by a bowler on test debut and also recorded the best bowling average by a bowler on his test debut (for a bowler with minimum of 8 wickets) with an average of 5.50 breaking the previous record held by Albert Trott.

In May 2018, he was one of 33 cricketers to be awarded a national contract by Sri Lanka Cricket ahead of the 2018–19 season.

Dananjaya played the second test against South Africa on 20 July 2018. During the match, he had a 74-run partnership with Rangana Herath. Dananjaya scored unbeaten 43 in that first innings and helped Sri Lanka swell their first-innings total to 338. In bowling, Dananjaya picked up his second five-wicket haul in his third Test. In the second innings, he took two wickets and finally Sri Lanka won the match by 199 runs and sealed the series 2–0.

In the fifth ODI against South Africa, Dananjaya took career-best figures of 6 for 29, where South Africa were bowled out for just 121 runs. South Africa dismissed inside 25 overs for their lowest total in, and against, Sri Lanka as well. He mixed the deliveries at will with wrong'un and googlies, where Proteas batsmen had no answers. Dananjaya's figures of 6–29 is the best bowling figures against South Africa by a Sri Lankan. Sri Lanka won the match by 178 runs and Dananjaya was adjudged man of the match for his match winning bowling performance. Despite all those results, South Africa won the series 3–2. He was also selected for ODI bowling nominees in ICC Cricket Awards 2019 for his bowling in this match. On Match 3 2021, Akila Dananjaya became only player to take hat-trick and then be smashed for six sixes in the same match, in his third over against Kieron Pollard.

=== Suspect bowling action ===
In November 2018, during the first Test against England at Galle, Dananjaya is reported with suspect bowling action. He was then requested to undergo testing on his action within 14 days. However, the ICC informed that he can bowl until the results of the bowling tests are out. Dananjaya played the second Test of the series and took a five wicket haul, despite Sri Lanka lost the match and the series. He missed the third Test due to biomechanical testing in Brisbane, Australia. In December 2018, he was suspended from bowling in international matches due to his action being deemed illegal. Although he was allowed to bowl in domestic cricket with cameras placed all around to capture his action governed by Sri Lanka Cricket.

On 1 February 2019, he went Chennai to reassess his bowling action. The reassessment took place at the Center for Sports Science (CSS) of the Sri Ramachandra Institute of Higher Education and Research in Chennai. On 18 February 2019, he was cleared by the ICC to play international cricket. He was included to the South African ODI series after clearance.

=== International comeback ===
Akila made his comeback return to national team during the tour of Caribbean in March 2021, after a gap of 2 years since reassessing his bowling action. In the first T20I between the two sides at Antigua, Akila Dananjaya took a hat-trick in his second over of the spell which was also his maiden hat-trick at international level by dismissing Evin Lewis, Chris Gayle and Nicholas Pooran in consecutive deliveries. It was the first time that a bowler took a hat-trick against West Indies in a T20I. He became the third Sri Lankan bowler to take a hat-trick in T20I after Thisara Perera and Lasith Malinga as well as the first Sri Lankan spinner to do so. However, he also conceded 36 runs in the very next over after claiming the hat-trick. Kieron Pollard hammered Akila for 6 successive sixes, become just the second batsman in T20I history to hit 6 sixes in an over of a T20I, after Yuvraj Singh. Pollard also became the third overall cricketer to hit 36 runs in an over of an international match after Herschelle Gibbs and Yuvraj Singh. Akila eventually conceded the joint-most expensive bowling figures in an over of a T20I match (36 runs) with Stuart Broad.

In September 2021, Dananjaya was named as one of four reserve players in Sri Lanka's squad for the 2021 ICC Men's T20 World Cup. He was included in the ODI and T20I squads against Zimbabwe in 2024, but did not play in the series. However he played the third ODI against Afghanistan in February 2024 and took two wickets in a winning cause for Sri Lanka. In the meantime, he was included in the T20I squad for the Afghanistan series as well and played in the third T20I.
