= Sandun Weerakkody =

Sri Lankan cricketer (born 1993)

Personal information
- Full name: Dharshanapriya Sandun Weerakkody
- Born: 3 September 1993 (age 33); Colombo, Sri Lanka
- Batting: Left-handed
- Role: Wicket-keeper

International information
- National side: Sri Lanka (2017–present)
- ODI debut (cap 177): 28 January 2017 v South Africa
- Last ODI: 10 February 2017 v South Africa
- ODI shirt no.: 52

Domestic team information
- Years: Team
- 2012-2014: Sri Lanka U-19s
- 2021: Dambulla Giants

Career statistics
| Competition | ODI | First-class |
|---|---|---|
| Matches | 3 | 76 |
| Runs scored | 73 | 4743 |
| Batting average | 24.33 | 37.94 |
| 100s/50s | 0/1 | 11/19 |
| Top score | 58 | 189 |
| Catches/stumpings | 2/– | 129/16 |
- Source: Cricinfo, 3 March 2017

Dharshanapriya Sandun Weerakkody (born 3 September 1993) is a professional Sri Lankan cricketer, who plays One Day Internationals for Sri Lanka. Weerakkody is a past pupil of Dharmaraja College, Kandy. A left-handed batsman and a wicketkeeper, he plays first-class cricket for Nondescripts Cricket Club.

== Domestic career ==
In August 2018, he was named in Kandy's squad the 2018 SLC T20 League. In March 2019, he was named in Galle's squad for the 2019 Super Provincial One Day Tournament.

On 19 December 2019, Weerakkody scored the fastest List A century by a Sri Lankan batsman, scoring 101 not out from 39 balls for Sinhalese Sports Club against Burgher Recreation Club in the 2019–20 Invitation Limited Over Tournament. In August 2021, he was named in the SLC Reds team for the 2021 SLC Invitational T20 League tournament. However, prior to the first match, he failed a fitness test.

On 20 January 2023, during National Super League, Sandun scored 11th First Class Century against Colombo team. He scored 144 runs in 154 deliveries hitting 18 boundaries and four sixes. Finally Kandy team won the match.

== International career ==
In January 2017 he was named in Sri Lanka's One Day International (ODI) squad for their series against South Africa. He made his ODI debut for Sri Lanka against South Africa on 28 January 2017, scoring five runs. His first ODI fifty came in the second match of his career, but Sri Lanka lost the match by 40 runs.

In December 2018, he was named in Sri Lanka team for the 2018 ACC Emerging Teams Asia Cup.
