= Ashen Bandara =

Sri Lankan cricketer (born 1998)

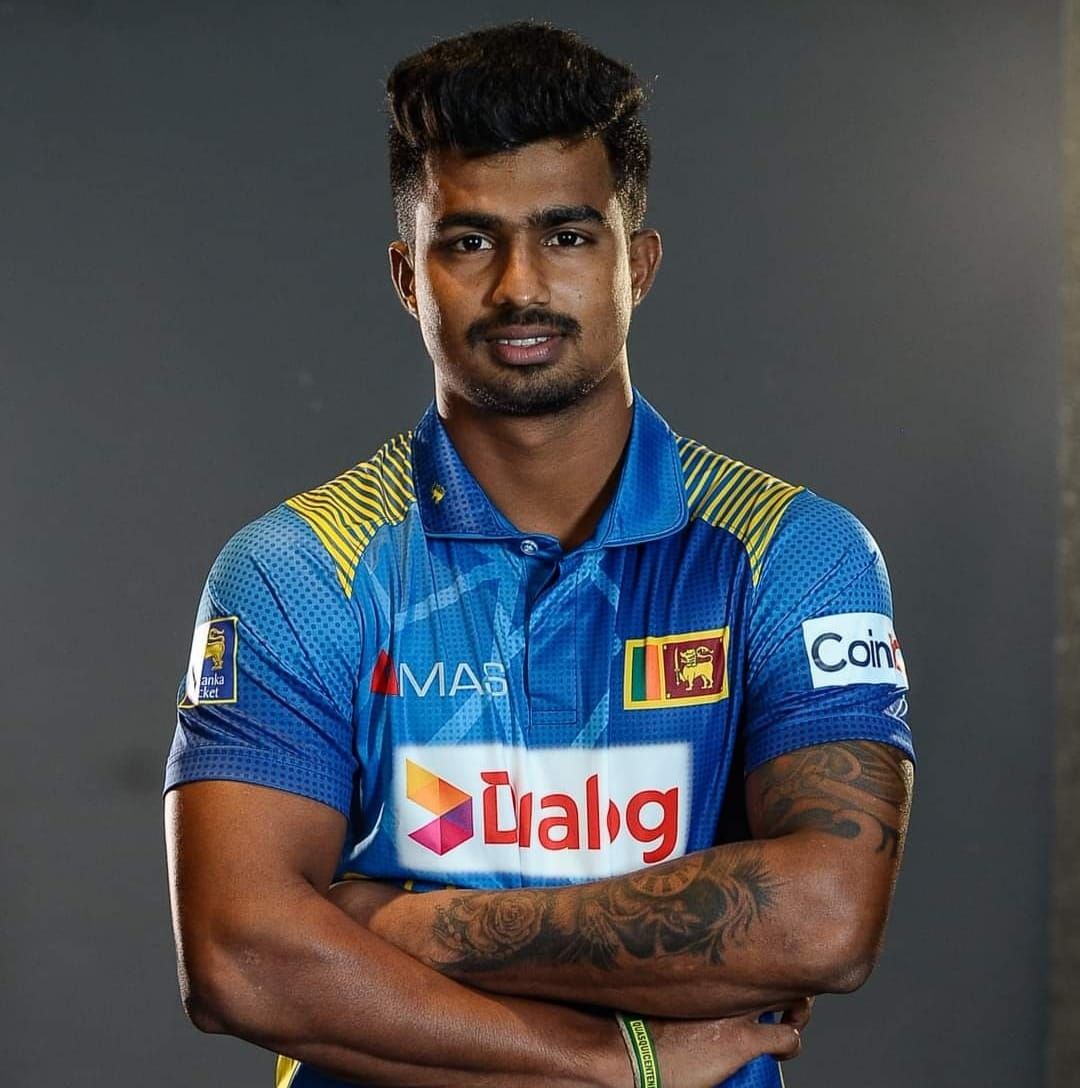

Personal information
- Full name: Koralegedera Nadeeja Ashen Bandara
- Born: 23 November 1998 (age 27); Galle, Sri Lanka
- Batting: Right-handed
- Bowling: Right-arm leg break
- Role: Batting All-rounder

International information
- National side: Sri Lanka (2021-present)
- ODI debut (cap 193): 10 March 2021 v West Indies
- Last ODI: 15 January 2023 v India
- T20I debut (cap 85): 3 March 2021 v West Indies
- Last T20I: 23 October 2022 v Ireland

Domestic team information
- Years: Team
- 2018–present: Galle
- 2020: Dambulla Viiking
- 2021: Jaffna Kings
- 2022: Kandy Falcons

Career statistics
Competition	ODI	T20I	FC
Matches	6	6	27
Runs scored	141	84	1,281
Batting average	35.25	28.00	38.81
100s/50s	0/2	0/0	1/8
Top score	55*	44*	106
Balls bowled	6	6	418
Wickets	0	0	6
Bowling average	–	–	47.83
5 wickets in innings	–	–	0
10 wickets in match	–	–	0
Best bowling	–	–	2/4
Catches/stumpings	3/–	2/–	24/–
Medal record
Men's Cricket
Representing Sri Lanka
Asian Games
Bronze medal – third place	2026 Aichi–Nagoya	Team
South Asian Games
Silver medal – second place	2019 Kathmandu/Pokhara	Team
- Source: Cricinfo, 19 January 2023

Koralegedera Nadeeja Ashen Bandara (born 23 November 1998), known as Ashen Bandara, is a professional Sri Lankan cricketer who plays limited over internationals for Sri Lanka. He made his international debut for the Sri Lanka cricket team in March 2021. His fielding is exceptional and many times he has served as the substitute fielder for Sri Lanka cricket team.

== Domestic career ==
Ashen Bandara started his cricket career at his school St. Aloysius' College, Galle. He made his Twenty20 debut for Galle Cricket Club in the 2015–16 Premier T20 Tournament on 6 January 2016.

In December 2017, he was named in Sri Lanka's squad for the 2018 Under-19 Cricket World Cup. He made his first-class debut for Saracens Sports Club in the 2017–18 Premier League Tournament on 15 February 2018. He made his List A debut for Saracens Sports Club in the 2017–18 Premier Limited Overs Tournament on 14 March 2018.

In March 2018, he was named in Galle's squad for the 2017–18 Super Four Provincial Tournament. The following month, he was also named in Galle's squad for the 2018 Super Provincial One Day Tournament. In August 2018, he was named in Colombo's squad the 2018 SLC T20 League. In March 2019, he was named in Dambulla's squad for the 2019 Super Provincial One Day Tournament.

In January 2020, he scored a century for Saracens Sports Club in the 2019–20 SLC Twenty20 Tournament. In October 2020, he was drafted by the Dambulla Viiking for the inaugural edition of the Lanka Premier League. In August 2021, he was named in the SLC Blues team for the 2021 SLC Invitational T20 League tournament. In November 2021, he was selected to play for the Jaffna Kings following the players' draft for the 2021 Lanka Premier League. In July 2022, he was signed by the Kandy Falcons for the third edition of the Lanka Premier League.

Having represented the Sri Lanka Police cricket team that won joint champion status in the 2023 Sri Lanka Cricket first-class competition, Bandara was appointed to the police service in the rank of inspector of police (IP).

== International career ==
In November 2019, he was named in Sri Lanka's squad for the 2019 ACC Emerging Teams Asia Cup in Bangladesh. Later the same month, he was named in Sri Lanka's squad for the men's cricket tournament at the 2019 South Asian Games. The Sri Lanka team won the silver medal, after they lost to Bangladesh by seven wickets in the final.

In February 2021, Bandara was named in Sri Lanka's limited overs squad for their series against the West Indies. He made his Twenty20 International (T20I) debut for Sri Lanka on 3 March 2021, against the West Indies. He made his One Day International (ODI) debut for Sri Lanka on 10 March 2021, also against the West Indies. On ODI debut, he scored his maiden ODI half century. In his third ODI match, he scored his second ODI half century, and with Wanidu Hasaranga, made an unbeaten 123-run partnership for the seventh-wicket.

On 1 October 2021, he was added to Sri Lanka's squad for the 2021 ICC Men's T20 World Cup. In April 2022, Sri Lanka Cricket (SLC) named him in the Sri Lanka Emerging Team's squad for their tour to England. In June 2022, he was named in the Sri Lanka A squad for their matches against Australia A during Australia's tour of Sri Lanka.
