= Lakshan Madushanka =

Sri Lankan cricketer (born 1990)

Personal information
- Born: 9 December 1990 (age 35)
- Source: ESPNcricinfo, 16 December 2018

Lakshan Madushanka (born 10 December 1990) is a Sri Lankan cricketer. He made his first-class debut for Sri Lanka Army Sports Club in the 2013–14 Premier Trophy on 7 February 2014.
