= Lasith Embuldeniya =

Sri Lankan cricketer (born 1996)

Personal information
- Born: 26 October 1996 (age 30); Colombo, Sri Lanka
- Batting: Left-handed
- Bowling: Slow left-arm orthodox
- Role: Bowler

International information
- National side: Sri Lanka (2019–2022)
- Test debut (cap 149): 13 February 2019 v South Africa
- Last Test: 29 June 2022 v Australia

Career statistics
Competition	Test	FC	LA	T20
Matches	17	87	45	13
Runs scored	191	1,170	145	8
Batting average	7.34	12.18	8.52	8.00
100s/50s	0/0	0/1	0/0	0/0
Top score	40	54	18*	4*
Balls bowled	4,845	20,415	1,961	182
Wickets	71	385	60	16
Bowling average	36.77	29.20	23.16	11.93
5 wickets in innings	5	26	1	0
10 wickets in match	1	7	0	0
Best bowling	7/137	9/86	5/43	3/5
Catches/stumpings	2/–	26/–	8/–	3/–
- Source: Cricinfo, 29 June 2022

Lasith Embuldeniya (Sinhala: ලසිත් ඇඹුල්දෙණිය, [lasit æᵐbuldeɳijə] (Note: [ᵐb] is a Prenasalized consonant.); born 26 October 1996) is a professional Sri Lankan cricketer who plays Test match cricket for Sri Lanka. He made his international debut for the Sri Lanka cricket team in February 2019, and plays for Nondescripts Cricket Club in domestic cricket.

== Domestic career ==
He made his first-class debut for Nondescripts Cricket Club in the 2016–17 Premier League Tournament on 28 January 2017. He made his List A debut for Matara District in the 2016–17 Districts One Day Tournament on 17 March 2017.

In March 2018, he was named in Colombo's squad for the 2017–18 Super Four Provincial Tournament. The following month, he was also named in Colombo's squad for the 2018 Super Provincial One Day Tournament. In August 2018, he was named in Colombo's squad the 2018 SLC T20 League.

He made his Twenty20 debut on 4 January 2020, for Nondescripts Cricket Club in the 2019–20 SLC Twenty20 Tournament. In March 2020, in round seven of the 2019–20 Premier League Tournament, Embuldeniya took nine wickets for 86 runs in the second innings of the match against Saracens Sports Club.

In October 2020, he was drafted by the Kandy Tuskers for the inaugural edition of the Lanka Premier League. In August 2021, he was named in the SLC Greens team for the 2021 SLC Invitational T20 League tournament. However, prior to the first match, he failed a fitness test.

== International career ==
In December 2018, he was named in Sri Lanka team for the 2018 ACC Emerging Teams Asia Cup. In February 2019, he was named in Sri Lanka's Test squad for their series against South Africa. He made his Test debut for Sri Lanka against South Africa on 13 February 2019. In the match, Embuldeniya became the fourth bowler and first left arm spinner for Sri Lanka to take a five-wicket haul on Test debut, finishing with figures of 5 for 66. In the second Test match of the series, Embuldeniya dislocated a finger during the first day, and was ruled out for six weeks.

On 20 January 2020, during the first Test against Zimbabwe, Embuldeniya took his second five wicket haul. He was the only specialist spinner of the team and took 5 for 114 runs to restrict Zimbabwe for 358. During the second innings, Embuldeniya took two wickets, with Sri Lanka winning by ten wickets. After poor performances in both the Bangladesh series and the first Test against Australia, Embuldeniya was dropped from the squad.
