= Manoj Sarathchandra =

Sri Lankan cricketer (born 1993)

Personal information
- Full name: Dinayadura Manoj Sarathchandra
- Born: 6 February 1993 (age 33); Kandy, Sri Lanka

Domestic team information
- Years: Team
- Tamil Union Cricket Club
- Sebastinites (squad no. Sinhalese Sports Club)
- Source: Cricinfo, 29 January 2016

Manoj Sarathchandra (born 6 February 1993) is a Sri Lankan cricketer who plays for Sinhalese Sports Club. In March 2019, he was named in Kandy's squad for the 2019 Super Provincial One Day Tournament.
