= 2025 National Super League 4-Day Tournament =

Cricket tournament in Sri Lanka

- Dates: 13 March – 30 April 2025
- Administrator: Sri Lanka Cricket
- Cricket format: First-class
- Tournament format(s): Round-robin and final
- Host: Sri Lanka
- Champions: Galle District (2nd title)
- Runners-up: Kandy District
- Participants: 5
- Matches: 11
- Player of the series: Dinesh Chandimal (Galle)
- Most runs: Ravindu Rasantha (563)
- Most wickets: Akila Dananjaya (37)

The 2025 National Super League 4-Day Tournament was the fourth edition of the National Super League 4-Day Tournament, a first-class cricket competition that played in Sri Lanka. The tournament started on 13 March 2025, and the final match ended on 30 April 2025. Five district cricket teams took part in the competition, organised by the Sri Lanka Cricket (SLC). In March 2025, the SLC confirmed the fixtures for the tournament.

Galle District defend their title.

== Points table ==
Pos	Team	Pld	W	L	D	Pts	Qualification
1	Dambulla District	4	2	1	1	45.978	Advanced to the final
2	Galle District	4	1	0	3	45.666	Advanced to the final
3	Kandy District	4	0	1	3	38.103	
4	Colombo District	4	1	1	2	24.926	
5	Jaffna District	4	0	1	3	12.481	

Source: ESPNcricinfo

== League stage ==
13–16 March 2025
Scorecard

Galle District	v	Kandy District
602/9d (168 overs); Nipun Dhananjaya 137 (275); Chamindu Wickramasinghe 3/90 (22 overs)		350 (88 overs); Kamil Mishara 158* (255); Milan Rathnayake 4/65 (16 overs)
269/5 (79 overs); Pasindu Sooriyabandara 102* (203); Sahan Arachchige 2/35 (12 overs)

Match drawn
Mahinda Rajapaksa International Cricket Stadium, Sooriyawewa, Hambantota
Umpires: Hemantha Boteju and Shantha Fonseka

- Galle District won the toss and elected to bat.
- Points: Galle District 10.673, Kandy District 2.275

13–16 March 2025
Scorecard

Colombo District	v	Jaffna District
386 (95 overs); Avishka Fernando 144 (164); Jeffrey Vandersay 6/86 (30 overs)		246 (90.5 overs); Anjala Bandara 88 (218); Nishan Peiris 5/59 (30.5 overs)
313/6d (58 overs); Dhananjaya Lakshan 75 (87); Murvin Abinash 2/63 (14 overs)		366 (111.5 overs); Ravindu Rasantha 107 (182); Muditha Lakshan 4/84 (29 overs)

Colombo District won by 87 runs
Galle International Stadium, Galle
Umpires: Ravindra Kottahachchi and Asanka Nanayakkara

- Colombo District won the toss and elected to bat.
- Points: Colombo District 17.748, Jaffna District 4.13

20–23 March 2025
Scorecard

Kandy District	v	Colombo District
460 (111.2 overs); Kamil Mishara 172 (217); Kasun Rajitha 3/80 (23 overs)		106 (43 overs); Navod Paranavithana 22 (30); Shiran Fernando 4/49 (14 overs)
244/3d (56.4 overs); Nuwanidu Fernando 100* (111); Lahiru Madushanka 1/19 (7 overs)		313/7 (120 overs); Avishka Fernando 74 (141); Sahan Nanayakkara 3/76 (36 overs)

Match drawn
Mahinda Rajapaksa International Cricket Stadium, Sooriyawewa, Hambantota
Umpires: Ravindra Kottahachchi and Chamara de Soysa

- Kandy District won the toss and elected to bat.
- Points: Kandy District 11.31, Colombo District 2.348

20–23 March 2025
Scorecard

Galle District	v	Dambulla District
267 (74 overs); Oshada Fernando 100 (163); Akila Dananjaya 7/83 (27 overs)		261 (74.2 overs); Dhananjaya de Silva 106 (155); Milan Rathnayake 4/38 (15.2 overs)
244 (64.4 overs); Ramesh Mendis 56 (106); Akila Dananjaya 5/80 (24.4 overs)		105 (28 overs); Akila Dananjaya 28 (35); Dunith Wellalage 6/26 (9 overs)

Galle District won by 145 runs
Galle International Stadium, Galle
Umpires: Ruchira Palliyaguruge and Prageeth Rambukwella

- Galle won the toss and elected to bat.
- Points: Galle District 17.278, Dambulla District 4.915

27–30 March 2025
Scorecard

Colombo District	v	Dambulla District
300 (76.2 overs); Kusal Mendis 119 (123); Dulaj Samuditha 3/70 (16.2 overs)		400 (96.1 overs); Pavan Rathnayake 163 (255); Dhananjaya Lakshan 4/9 (10 overs)
232 (64.5 overs); Kusal Mendis 92 (130); Akila Dananjaya 7/104 (29 overs)		133/2 (23.3 overs); Lasith Croospulle 47 (33); Dhananjaya Lakshan 1/27 (5 overs)

Dambulla District won by 8 wickets
Rangiri Dambulla International Stadium, Dambulla
Umpires: Shantha Fonseka and Lyndon Hannibal

- Colombo District won the toss and elected to bat.
- Points: Dambulla District 18.333, Colombo District 2.53

27–30 March 2025
Scorecard

Jaffna District	v	Kandy District
201 (68.1 overs); Ravindu Rasantha 97 (198); Chamindu Wickramasinghe 5/54 (11.1 overs)		332 (85.1 overs); Janishka Perera 97 (137); Tharindu Rathnayake 5/99 (27 overs)
491/9d (113.4 overs); Ravindu Rasantha 206* (351); Shiran Fernando 3/89 (21 overs)		197/4 (58.1 overs); Sahan Arachchige 52* (113); Kavishka Anjula 1/15 (4 overs)

Match drawn
R Premadasa Stadium, Colombo
Umpires: Chandrika Amarasinghe and Raveendra Wimalasiri

- Kandy District won the toss and elected to field.
- Points: Kandy District 9.223, Jaffna District 4.903

3–6 April 2025
Scorecard

Jaffna District	v	Galle District
305 (69.1 overs); Thanuka Dabare 81 (80); Dilum Sudeera 5/60 (20 overs)		371 (98 overs); Ramesh Mendis 124 (203); Sithum Disanayaka 3/57 (20.5 overs)
354/5 (71 overs); Angelo Mathews 103 (167); Nisala Tharaka 2/34 (10 overs)

Match drawn
Mahinda Rajapaksa International Cricket Stadium, Sooriyawewa, Hambantota
Umpires: Lyndon Hannibal and Prageeth Rambukwella

- Galle District won the toss and elected to field.
- Points: Jaffna District 0.648, Galle District 9.42

3–6 April 2025
Scorecard

Kandy District	v	Dambulla District
453 (97 overs); Pathum Nissanka 203 (260); Akila Dananjaya 5/140 (36 overs)		340 (84.4 overs); Dhananjaya de Silva 108 (152); Ashian Daniel 4/109 (24 overs)
278/9d (70.5 overs); Pawantha Weerasinghe 101 (173); Akila Dananjaya 5/87 (24 overs)		392/6 (64.5 overs); Nishan Madushka 126 (153); Sahan Nanayakkara 3/115 (22 overs)

Dambulla District won by 4 wickets
R Premadasa Stadium, Colombo
Umpires: Hemantha Boteju and Rohitha Kottahachchi

- Dambulla District won the toss and elected to field.
- Points: Dambulla District 14.73, Kandy District 5.295

20–23 April 2025
Scorecard

Galle District	v	Colombo District
435 (136.2 overs); Dinesh Chandimal 132 (195); Dhananjaya Lakshan 5/99 (29.2 overs)		422 (123.3 overs); Charith Asalanka 151 (206); Dunith Wellalage 4/81 (29 overs)
118/3 (36 overs); Nipun Dhananjaya 73* (113); Prabath Jayasuriya 2/61 (18 overs)

Match drawn
Rangiri Dambulla International Stadium, Dambulla
Umpires: Asanka Nanayakkara and Ruchira Palliyaguruge

- Colombo won the toss and elected to field.
- Points: Galle District 8.295, Colombo District 2.3

20–23 April 2025
Scorecard

Dambulla District	v	Jaffna District
418 (107 overs); Ravindu Rasantha 120 (229); Dulaj Samuditha 3/88 (22 overs)		470/8 (163 overs); Vishad Randika 122 (331); Nimesh Vimukthi 2/111 (42 overs)

Match drawn
Pallekele International Cricket Stadium, Pallekele
Umpires: Chandrika Amarasinghe and Ravindra Kottahachchi

- Points: Jaffna District 2.8, Dambulla District 8

== Final ==
27–30 April 2025
Scorecard

Galle District	v	Dambulla District
370 (96.2 overs); Oshada Fernando 120 (188); Mohamed Shiraz 4/92 (25.2 overs)		313 (84.2 overs); Vishad Randika 124 (186); Nimsara Atharagalla 5/101 (18 overs)
246/5 (83 overs); Dinesh Chandimal 64 (138); Mohamed Shiraz 2/35 (19 overs)

Match drawn (Galle District won on 1st innings)
Sinhalese Sports Club Ground, Colombo
Umpires: Chamara de Soysa and Raveendra Wimalasiri
Player of the match: Dinesh Chandimal (Galle)

- Dambulla District won the toss and elected to field.
