= 2024 National Super League 4-Day Tournament =

Cricket tournament

- Dates: 18 January – 3 May 2024
- Administrator: Sri Lanka Cricket
- Cricket format: First-class
- Tournament format(s): Double round-robin and final
- Host: Sri Lanka
- Champions: Galle District (1st title)
- Runners-up: Kandy District
- Participants: 5
- Matches: 21
- Most runs: Oshada Fernando (885)
- Most wickets: Nishan Peiris (35)

The 2024 National Super League 4-Day Tournament was the third edition of the National Super League 4-Day Tournament, a first-class cricket competition that was played in Sri Lanka. The tournament started on 18 January 2024 and the final match ended on 3 May 2024. Five district cricket teams took part in the competition, organized by the Sri Lanka Cricket (SLC). In January 2024, the SLC confirmed the fixtures for the tournament.

== Points table ==
Pos	Team	Pld	W	L	D	NR	Pts
1	Galle District	7	3	0	4	0	94.465
2	Kandy District	8	3	3	2	0	92.585
3	Dambulla District	7	0	1	6	0	58.25
4	Colombo District	7	1	2	4	0	52.45
5	Jaffna District	7	1	2	4	0	50.07
Source: ESPNcricinfo

== League stage ==
18–21 January 2024
Scorecard

Kandy District	v	Galle District
365 (93.4 overs); Lahiru Udara 100 (128); Udith Madushan 5/46 (17.4 overs)		205 (65.5 overs); Dinesh Chandimal 69 (132); Chamika Gunasekara 3/31 (9 overs)
190/5d (43 overs); Lahiru Udara 72 (72); Ramesh Mendis 3/74 (16 overs)		201/7 (53 overs); Oshada Fernando 75 (82); Ashian Daniel 5/59 (20.1 overs)

Match drawn
Mahinda Rajapaksa International Cricket Stadium, Sooriyawewa, Hambantota
Umpires: Ravindra Kottahachchi and Pradeep Udawatta

- Galle District won the toss and elected to field.
- Points: Kandy District 13.325, Galle District 4.28

18–21 January 2024
Scorecard

Colombo District	v	Jaffna District
348 (121.1 overs); Nuwanidu Fernando 105 (259); Lahiru Madushanka 3/39 (20 overs)		359 (113.1 overs); Nishan Madushka 60 (76); Isitha Wijesundara 3/49 (17 overs)
142/5 (34.3 overs); Himasha Liyanage 51* (60); Ravindu Fernando 3/67 (14 overs)

Match drawn
Sinhalese Sports Club Ground, Colombo
Umpires: Sanjeewa Fernando and Chamara De Zoysa

- Colombo District won the toss and elected to bat.
- Points: Jaffna District 12.045, Colombo District 3.95

25–28 January 2024
Scorecard

Dambulla District	v	Colombo District
530 (153 overs); Angelo Mathews 146 (275); Isitha Wijesundara 3/69 (23 overs)		445 (120.1 overs); Dimuth Karunaratne 161 (261); Akila Dananjaya 3/159 (44.1 overs)
210/8 (61 overs); Sonal Dinusha 100* (160); Kasun Rajitha 3/29 (9 overs)

Match drawn
R Premadasa Stadium, Colombo
Umpires: Chandrika Amarasinghe and Keerthi Bandara

- Dambulla District won the toss and elected to bat.
- Points: Dambulla District 12.55, Colombo District 4.7

25–28 January 2024
Scorecard

Jaffna District	v	Kandy District
346 (104.2 overs); Dhananjaya de Silva 113 (189); Chamika Karunaratne 3/51 (12.2 overs)		187 (67.1 overs); Ahan Wickramasinghe 51 (78); Jeffrey Vandersay 4/51 (16.1 overs)
234 (68 overs); Nipun Karunanayake 60 (75); Chamika Gunasekara 3/43 (11 overs)		229 (53.2 overs); Ahan Wickramasinghe 116* (86); Shashika Dulshan 6/99 (23 overs)

Jaffna District won by 164 runs
Mahinda Rajapaksa International Cricket Stadium, Sooriyawewa, Hambantota
Umpires: Gamini Dissanayake and Shantha Fonseka

- Kandy District won the toss and elected to field.
- Points: Jaffna District 17.9, Kandy District 5.08

1–4 February 2024
Scorecard

Galle District	v	Dambulla District
519/7d (120 overs); Pasindu Sooriyabandara 148 (207); Chamindu Wijesinghe 3/70 (21 overs)		269 (99.4 overs); Pavan Rathnayake 63 (112); Nishan Peiris 5/72 (32.4 overs)
		253/7 (80.3 overs) (f/o); Sonal Dinusha 67 (105); Nishan Peiris 3/74 (23.3 overs)

Match drawn
Mahinda Rajapaksa International Cricket Stadium, Sooriyawewa, Hambantota
Umpires: Ravindra Kottahachchi and Rajith Massalage

- Galle District won the toss and elected to bat.
- Points: Galle District 12.55, Dambulla District 3.66

1–3 February 2024
Scorecard

Colombo District	v	Kandy District
377 (103.4 overs); Pathum Kumara 101 (156); Wanuja Sahan 3/88 (26.4 overs)		320/9d (74.1 overs); Pathum Nissanka 151 (186); Nuwanidu Fernando 3/26 (6 overs)
102 (30.2 overs); Lakshitha Manasinghe 29 (46); Wanuja Sahan 4/45 (12 overs)		160/3 (32.1 overs); Kasun Vidura 76* (103); Nisala Tharaka 1/25 (4 overs)

Kandy District won by 7 wickets
R Premadasa Stadium, Colombo
Umpires: Asanga Jayasooriya and Chamara De Zoysa

- Colombo District won the toss and elected to bat.
- Points: Kandy District 17.4, Colombo District 4.195

8–11 February 2024
Scorecard

Galle District	v	Jaffna District
265/9d (89.5 overs); Oshada Fernando 58 (92); Santhush Gunathilake 3/21 (14 overs)		185 (76.4 overs); Nishan Madushka 49 (103); Nimesh Vimukthi 4/41 (22 overs)
361/4d (83.1 overs); Sangeeth Cooray 193 (271); Santhush Gunathilake 2/53 (13.1 overs)		206 (65 overs); Dhananjaya de Silva 86 (115); Nimesh Vimukthi 4/57 (23 overs)

Galle District won by 235 runs
Mahinda Rajapaksa International Cricket Stadium, Sooriyawewa, Hambantota
Umpires: Nilan De Silva and Ranmore Martinesz

- Galle District won the toss and elected to bat.
- Points: Galle District 18.13, Jaffna District 3.905

8–11 February 2024
Scorecard

Dambulla District	v	Kandy District
311 (83 overs); Sonal Dinusha 82 (109); Wanuja Sahan 6/70 (24 overs)		369 (94.4 overs); Sithara Gimhan 94 (107); Murvin Abinash 3/77 (24.4 overs)
388 (102.3 overs); Kamindu Mendis 172 (276); Wanuja Sahan 4/82 (27.3 overs)		209/9 (77.4 overs); Kasun Vidura 63 (131); Dushan Hemantha 2/35 (17 overs)

Match drawn
Rangiri Dambulla International Stadium
Umpires: Chandrika Amarasinghe and Vidura Prasad

- Dambulla District won the toss and elected to bat.
- Points: Kandy District 13.89, Dambulla District 6.345

16–18 February 2024
Scorecard

Colombo District	v	Galle District
145 (41.3 overs); Nipun Dhananjaya 63 (94); Udith Madushan 4/45 (11 overs)		255 (86.5 overs); Vishad Randika 96 (201); Nisala Tharaka 6/67 (20.5 overs)
197 (73.2 overs); Ashen Bandara 48 (102); Nishan Peiris 6/47 (23 overs)		89/6 (27 overs); Dhananjaya Lakshan 29* (24); Nalin Priyadarshana 4/41 (13 overs)

Galle District won by 4 wickets
Mahinda Rajapaksa International Cricket Stadium, Sooriyawewa, Hambantota
Umpires: Gamini Dissanayake and Pradeep Udawatta

- Colombo District won the toss and elected to bat.
- Points: Galle District 16.72, Colombo District 4.11

16–19 February 2024
Scorecard

Dambulla District	v	Jaffna District
619/8d (180.1 overs); Pavan Rathnayake 240 (401); Janith Liyanage 2/65 (21 overs)		366 (95.1 overs); Ron Chandraguptha 110 (171); Dushan Hemantha 4/113 (26.1 overs)
220/5 (49 overs); Risira Weerasuriya 94 (131); Shashika Dulshan 2/93 (22 overs)

Match drawn
R Premadasa Stadium, Colombo
Umpires: Hemantha Boteju and Shantha Fonseka

- Dambulla District won the toss and elected to bat.
- Points: Dambulla District 12.6, Jaffna District 3.78

14–16 March 2024
Scorecard

Kandy District	v	Galle District
210 (63.5 overs); Wanuja Sahan 56 (64); Nimesh Vimukthi 3/21 (6.5 overs)		248 (78.4 overs); Vishad Randika 80 (168); Wanuja Sahan 3/55 (16.4 overs)
144 (47.2 overs); Kamil Mishara 38 (87); Nishan Peiris 3/18 (5 overs)		107/0 (17.2 overs); Oshada Fernando 51* (51); Nimsara Atharagalla 0/14 (2 overs)

Galle District won by 10 wickets
Mahinda Rajapaksa International Cricket Stadium, Sooriyawewa, Hambantota
Umpires: Vidura Prasad and Prageeth Rambukwella

- Kandy District won the toss and elected to bat.
- Points: Galle District 16.775, Kandy District 3.27

14–17 March 2024
Scorecard

Jaffna District	v	Colombo District
491 (143.5 overs); Ron Chandraguptha 128 (267); Ashen Bandara 2/22 (6.5 overs)		592/8d (156 overs); Nuwanidu Fernando 180 (288); Santhush Gunathilake 2/66 (27 overs)
146/2 (32 overs); Hasitha Boyagoda 50* (85); Nalin Priyadarshana 1/23 (5 overs)

Match drawn
R Premadasa Stadium, Colombo
Umpires: Gamini Dissanayake and Rajith Massalage

- Jaffna District won the toss and elected to bat.
- Points: Colombo District 11.8, Jaffna District 3.93

21–24 March 2024
Scorecard

Dambulla District	v	Colombo District
240 (66.5 overs); Chamindu Wijesinghe 51 (82); Nisala Tharaka 4/77 (18.5 overs)		210 (53.2 overs); Krishan Sanjula 49 (76); Mohamed Shiraz 3/65 (18 overs)
299/9d (93.2 overs); Minod Bhanuka 83 (121); Nisala Tharaka 3/48 (19 overs)		159/4 (31 overs); Krishan Sanjula 58 (66); Mohamed Shiraz 1/15 (6 overs)

Match drawn
Mahinda Rajapaksa International Cricket Stadium, Sooriyawewa, Hambantota
Umpires: Lyndon Hannibal and Ravindra Kottahachchi

- Colombo District won the toss and elected to field.
- Points: Dambulla District 12.795, Colombo District 4.695

21–24 March 2024
Scorecard

Jaffna District	v	Kandy District
261 (69 overs); Janith Liyanage 83 (137); Nimsara Atharagalla 3/40 (9 overs)		369 (88.4 overs); Ahan Wickramasinghe 149 (178); Lahiru Madushanka 4/61 (18.4 overs)
291 (96.1 overs); Nipun Karunanayake 94 (195); Ashian Daniel 3/44 (19 overs)		185/5 (35.3 overs); Chamika Karunaratne 51* (44); Lahiru Madushanka 3/38 (7 overs)

Kandy District won by 5 wickets
R Premadasa Stadium, Colombo
Umpires: Keerthi Bandara and Hemantha Boteju

- Jaffna District won the toss and elected to bat.
- Points: Kandy District 17.77, Jaffna District 5.01

28–31 March 2024
Scorecard

Galle District	v	Dambulla District
425 (131.3 overs); Vishad Randika 171* (281); Dushan Hemantha 3/103 (26.3 overs)		280 (88.4 overs); Sonal Dinusha 66 (95); Milan Rathnayake 4/51 (18.4 overs)
339/8d (80.4 overs); Pasindu Sooriyabandara 94 (108); Mohamed Shiraz 2/40 (13 overs)		189/4 (46 overs); Pavan Rathnayake 71* (75); Suminda Lakshan 2/60 (14 overs)

Match drawn
Galle International Stadium, Galle
Umpires: Chandrika Amarasinghe and Nilan De Silva

- Dambulla District won the toss and elected to field.
- Points: Galle District 13.795, Dambulla District 5.045

28–30 March 2024
Scorecard

Colombo District	v	Kandy District
500 (127.2 overs); Dasun Shanaka 110 (138); Sithum Disanayaka 3/95 (23 overs)		199 (54.3 overs); Ahan Wickramasinghe 78 (107); Nuwanidu Fernando 4/58 (14 overs)
		280 (66.2 overs) (f/o); Niroshan Dickwella 104 (95); Nisala Tharaka 3/21 (7.2 overs)

Colombo District won by 21 runs
R Premadasa Stadium, Colombo
Umpires: Ruchira Palliyaguruge and Pradeep Udawatta

- Kandy District won the toss and elected to field.

4–7 April 2024
Scorecard

Galle District	v	Jaffna District
711/9d (172 overs); Pasindu Sooriyabandara 242 (346); Janith Liyanage 2/86 (20 overs)		480 (134 overs); Lahiru Madushanka 83 (171); Sangeeth Cooray 4/71 (33 overs)
143/1 (32.1 overs); Oshada Fernando 52* (94); Kalhara Senarathne 1/35 (11.1 overs)

Match drawn
R Premadasa Stadium, Colombo
Umpires: Sanjeewa Fernando and Raveendra Wimalasiri

- Jaffna District won the toss and elected to field.
- Points: Galle District 12.215, Jaffna District 3.5

4–7 April 2024
Scorecard

Kandy District	v	Dambulla District
276 (72.4 overs); Ahan Wickramasinghe 64 (90); Lakshan Gamage 3/19 (7 overs)		207 (58.5 overs); Risira Weerasuriya 42 (78); Sithum Disanayaka 3/43 (15 overs)
315 (93 overs); Raveen Yasas 83 (153); Sonal Dinusha 4/50 (21 overs)		244 (69.2 overs); Sanoj Darshika 53 (108); Wanuja Sahan 4/47 (14.2 overs)

Kandy District won by 140 runs
Rangiri Dambulla International Stadium, Dambulla
Umpires: Asanga Jayasooriya and Chamara De Zoysa

- Kandy District won the toss and elected to bat.
- Points: Kandy District 17.955, Dambulla District 5.255

23–26 April 2024
Scorecard

Galle District	v	Colombo District

Rangiri Dambulla International Stadium, Dambulla

23–26 April 2024
Scorecard

Dambulla District	v	Jaffna District

Pallekele International Cricket Stadium, Pallekele

== Final ==
30 April–3 May 2024
Scorecard

Kandy District	v	Galle District
316 (99 Overs); Sithara Gimhan 90 (184); Asanka Manoj 3/46 (20)		304 (86.4 Overs); Ramesh Mendis 111 (157); Sithum Disanayaka 3/50 (16.4)
163 (71 Overs)		178/3 (27.4 Overs)

Galle District won by 7 wickets
Pallekele International Cricket Stadium, Pallekele
Umpires: Prageeth Rambukwella and Raveendra Wimalasiri
Player of the match: Ramesh Mendis (Galle)

- Galle District won the toss and elected to field first.
