= 2023 Lanka Premier League =

Fourth edition of Lanka Premier League

- Dates: 30 July – 20 August 2023
- Administrator: Sri Lanka Cricket
- Cricket format: Twenty20
- Tournament format(s): Double round-robin and playoffs
- Host: Sri Lanka
- Champions: B-Love Kandy (1st title)
- Runners-up: Dambulla Aura
- Participants: 5
- Matches: 24
- Player of the series: Wanindu Hasaranga (B-Love Kandy)
- Most runs: Wanindu Hasaranga (B-Love Kandy) (279)
- Most wickets: Wanindu Hasaranga (B-Love Kandy) (19)
- Official website: Lanka Premier League

The 2023 Lanka Premier League, also known as Skyfair.news LPL T20, for sponsorship reasons, was the fourth edition of the Lanka Premier League (LPL), a Twenty20 franchise cricket tournament in Sri Lanka. It began on 30 July and the final was held on 20 August 2023. The tournament was played by five teams at three international venues. The league was organized by the Sri Lanka Cricket. Jaffna Kings were the defending champions. This was the first Lanka Premier League season to feature an auction as the previous editions used to have the draft to choose players.

Due to change of ownership various teams changed names. Kandy Falcons became B-Love Kandy, Galle Gladiators changed to Galle Titans, and Colombo Stars were renamed as Colombo Strikers.

On 20 August 2023, B-Love Kandy defeated Dambulla Aura by 5 wickets in the final, to win their maiden LPL title.

The total attendance in the 24 games was 200,000, the average attendance per game was 8,333.

== Competition format ==
Each team can include a maximum of six international players in their squad. The five teams will play each other twice in the round-robin stage. Among them, the top four teams will advance to the playoffs.

== Teams ==
Team	City	Debut	Owner	Captain	Coach
Colombo Strikers	Colombo, Western Province	2023	Sagar Khanna	Niroshan Dickwella	Simon Helmot
Dambulla Aura	Dambulla, Central Province	2022	Viranjith Thambugala	Kusal Mendis	Avishka Gunawardene
Galle Titans	Galle, Southern Province	2023	Nayana Wasalathilaka	Dasun Shanaka	Chamara Kapugedara
Jaffna Kings	Jaffna, Northern Province	2021	Subaskaran Allirajah	Thisara Perera	Thilina Kandamby
B-Love Kandy	Kandy, Central Province	2023	Omar Khan	Wanindu Hasaranga	Mushtaq Ahmed

== Squads ==
The players' auction was held on 14 June 2023. Prior to the auction, some big-name players signed contracts with the five teams. These players include Babar Azam, Fakhar Zaman, Shakib Al Hasan and David Miller.

Colombo Strikers	Dambulla Aura	Galle Titans	Jaffna Kings	B-Love Kandy
Niroshan Dickwella (c); Babar Azam; Naseem Shah; Chamika Karunarathne; Pathum Nissanka; Lakshan Sandakan; Nipun Dhananjaya; Movin Subasingha; Lahiru Udara; Eshan Malinga; Shashika Dulshan; Nuwanidu Fernando; Iftikhar Ahmed; Matheesha Pathirana; Jeffrey Vandersay; Angelo Perera; Dhananjaya Lakshan; Kavishka Anjula; Ramesh Mendis; Mohammad Nawaz; Ahan Wickramasinghe; Imam Ul Haq; Shoriful Islam	Kusal Mendis (c); Avishka Fernando; Dhananjaya de Silva; Kusal Perera; Hayden Kerr; Sadeera Samarawickrama; Binura Fernando; Noor Ahmad; Sachitha Jayathilake; Janith Liyanage; Dushan Hemantha; Pramod Madushan; Shahnawaz Dahani; Lakshan Edirisinghe; Jehan Daniel; Wanuja Sahan; Kavidu Pathirana; Ravindu Fernando; Alex Ross; Traveen Mathew; Manelker de Silva; Praveen Jayawickrama; Ben McDermott	Dasun Shanaka (c); Shakib Al Hasan; Tabraiz Shamsi; Bhanuka Rajapaksha; Seekuge Prasanna; Lahiru Kumara; Lasith Croospulle; Sohan de Livera; Ashan Priyanjan; Mohammad Mithun; Minod Bhanuka; Pasindu Sooriyabandara; Shevon Daniel; Mohamed Shiraz; Lahiru Samarakoon; Kasun Rajitha; Akila Dananjaya; Chad Bowes; Tim Seifert; Sonal Dinusha; Avishka Perera; Anuk Fernando; Vishwa Fernando; Milan Rathnayake; Liton Das; Richard Ngarava	Thisara Perera (c); David Miller; Maheesh Theekshana; Rahmanullah Gurbaz; Charith Asalanka; Dunith Wellalage; Shoaib Malik; Pathum Kumara; Vijayakanth Viyaskanth; Theesan Vithushan; Asanka Manoj; Nishan Madushka; Asitha Fernando; Nuwan Thushara; Dilshan Madushanka; Hardus Viljoen; Ashan Randika; Ratnarajah Thenurathan; Chris Lynn; Asela Gunaratne; Nandre Burger; Towhid Hridoy	Wanidu Hasaranga (c); Mujeeb Ur Rahman; Fakhar Zaman; Angelo Mathews; Isuru Udana; Dinesh Chandimal; Mohammad Hasnain; Dushmantha Chameera; Sahan Arachchige; Ashen Bandara; Asif Ali; Navod Paranavithana; Sarfaraz Ahmed; Kamindu Mendis; Nuwan Pradeep; Chaturanga de Silva; Lahiru Madushanka; Aamer Jamal; Malsha Tharupathi; Thanuka Dabare; Lasith Abeyratne; Avishka Tharindu

== Player auction ==
The auction was held on 14 June 2023, where the five franchises were allowed to spend a maximum of US$500,000 each. The auction was held at Shangri-La Colombo and the likes of Wasim Akram and Angelo Mathews were available during the player auction. Popular Indian cricket commentator Charu Sharma was invited as the chief auctioneer for the auction.

Each team was allowed to have a squad of 20-24 players, inclusive of a mandatory six overseas players and 14-19 domestic players. Any money not spent from the pre-signing kitty cannot be carried over to the auction. The teams also had a right-to-match option for their players, and the money for that had to come from within the auction kitty.

Bidding took place between two teams at any given time, with a third team allowed to join the bidding only once one of the first two teams had withdrawn from the process. An "accelerated" auction process occurred after the first 70 names were presented for bidding. This process saw franchises nominate 15-20 players, including unsold players, who will go under the hammer.

Players were categorised into two groups, capped and uncapped. Each capped player will be able to register themselves under base prices ranging from $10,000 to $50,000 in $10,000 increments. Uncapped players will be classed with a base price of $20,000 - those having played a minimum of 50 first-class matches; $10,000 - a minimum of 25 first-class matches, or a minimum of 18 matches in the LPL or any other equivalent T20 franchise league; and $5000 - those who do not meet any of the criteria mentioned above.

Dilshan Madushanka became the auction's most expensive player to be picked when Jaffna Kings bought him for a record price of $92,000. New Zealand's Chad Bowes became the auction's most expensive overseas player to be picked at $58,000 and it raised eyebrows given Bowes is yet to establish and prove himself at international level.

It was reported that some prominent overseas players including the likes of Rassie van der Dussen were not picked by any of the franchise owners due to the said players being signed up by rival franchise T20 leagues such as Global T20 Canada which are also set to clash with LPL during the same time period.

== Venues ==
R. Premadasa Stadium in Colombo and Pallekele International Cricket Stadium in Kandy were selected as the venues.

Colombo	Kandy
R. Premadasa Stadium	Pallekele International Cricket Stadium
Capacity: 35,000	Capacity: 35,000
2023 Lanka Premier League is located in Sri Lanka

== Standings ==
Pos	Team	Pld	W	L	NR	Pts	NRR
1	Dambulla Aura (R)	8	6	2	0	12	0.793
2	Galle Titans (3rd)	8	4	4	0	8	0.353
3	B-Love Kandy (C)	8	4	4	0	8	0.185
4	Jaffna Kings (4th)	8	3	5	0	6	−0.179
5	Colombo Strikers	8	3	5	0	6	−1.215

Source: ESPN Cricinfo
- The top four teams qualified for the playoffs
- Advance to Qualifier 1
- Advance to Eliminator

== Fixtures ==
Match 1
30 July 2023
19:30 (N)
Scorecard

Jaffna Kings; 173/5 (20 overs)	v	Colombo Strikers; 152 (19.4 overs)
Towhid Hridoy 54 (39); Matheesha Pathirana 1/32 (4 overs)		Niroshan Dickwella 58 (34); Hardus Viljoen 3/31 (4 overs)

Jaffna Kings won by 21 runs
R. Premadasa Stadium, Colombo
Umpires: Gazi Sohel (Ban) and Raveendra Wimalasiri (SL)
Player of the match: Vijayakanth Viyaskanth (Jaffna Kings)

- Colombo Strikers won the toss and elected to field.

Match 2
31 July 2023
15:00 (D/N)
Scorecard

Galle Titans; 180/5 (20 overs)	v	Dambulla Aura; 180/7 (20 overs)
Bhanuka Rajapaksa 48 (34); Shahnawaz Dahani 2/37 (4 overs)		Dhananjaya de Silva 43 (31); Dasun Shanaka 3/27 (4 overs)

Match tied
(Galle Titans won the Super Over)
R. Premadasa Stadium, Colombo
Umpires: Chamara de Soysa (SL) and Lyndon Hannibal (SL)
Player of the match: Dasun Shanaka (Galle Titans)

- Dambulla Aura won the toss and elected to field.
- Super Over: Dambulla Aura 9/1, Galle Titans 11/0

Match 3
31 July 2023
19:30 (N)
Scorecard

Colombo Strikers; 157/6 (20 overs)	v	B-Love Kandy; 130/8 (20 overs)
Babar Azam 59 (52); Isuru Udana 3/39 (4 overs)		Angelo Mathews 25 (22); Matheesha Pathirana 3/24 (4 overs)

Colombo Strikers won by 27 runs
R. Premadasa Stadium, Colombo
Umpires: Chandrika Amarasinghe (SL) and Gazi Sohel (Ban)
Player of the match: Babar Azam (Colombo Strikers)

- Colombo Strikers won the toss and elected to bat.

Match 4
1 August 2023
15:30 (D/N)
Scorecard

Jaffna Kings; 129/7 (20 overs)	v	Dambulla Aura; 132/2 (16.2 overs)
Charith Asalanka 56 (52); Binura Fernando 2/27 (4 overs)		Avishka Fernando 52 (32); Vijayakanth Viyaskanth 1/24 (4 overs)

Dambulla Aura won by 8 wickets
R. Premadasa Stadium, Colombo
Umpires: Ravindra Kottahachchi (SL) and Raveendra Wimalasiri (SL)
Player of the match: Avishka Fernando (Dambulla Aura)

- Jaffna Kings won the toss and elected to bat.

Match 5
1 August 2023
19:30 (D/N)
Scorecard

Galle Titans; 180/5 (20 overs)	v	B-Love Kandy; 97 (17.1 overs)
Tim Seifert 74 (39); Mohammad Hasnain 1/26 (4 overs)		Ashen Bandara 27 (19); Kasun Rajitha 2/8 (2 overs)

Galle Titans won by 83 runs
R. Premadasa Stadium, Colombo
Umpires: Chamara de Soysa (SL) and Gazi Sohel (Ban)
Player of the match: Tim Seifert (Galle Titans)

- Galle Titans won the toss and elected to bat.

Match 6
4 August 2023
15:00 (D/N)
Scorecard

Dambulla Aura; 156/6 (20 overs)	v	B-Love Kandy; 160/3 (18.3 overs)
Dhananjaya de Silva 61 (39); Mujeeb Ur Rahman 2/17 (4 overs)		Dinesh Chandimal 48 (29); Dhananjaya de Silva 1/16 (3 overs)

B-Love Kandy won by 7 wickets
Pallekele International Cricket Stadium, Pallekele
Umpires: Prageeth Rambukwella (SL) and Gazi Sohel (Ban)
Player of the match: Mujeeb Ur Rahman (B-Love Kandy)

- Dambulla Aura won the toss and elected to bat.

Match 7
4 August 2023
19:30 (D/N)
Scorecard

Galle Titans; 117/9 (20 overs)	v	Jaffna Kings; 120/2 (12.4 overs)
Dasun Shanaka 30 (24); Dunith Wellalage 4/10 (4 overs)		Rahmanullah Gurbaz 54 (39); Shakib Al Hasan 2/31 (4 overs)

Jaffna Kings won by 8 wickets
Pallekele International Cricket Stadium, Pallekele
Umpires: Kumar Dharmasena (SL) and Raveendra Wimalasiri (SL)
Player of the match: Dunith Wellalage (Jaffna Kings)

- Galle Titans won the toss and elected to bat.

Match 8
5 August 2023
15:00
Scorecard

Dambulla Aura; 192/6 (20 overs)	v	Colombo Strikers; 182/4 (20 overs)
Kusal Mendis 87 (46); Matheesha Pathirana 3/31 (4 overs)		Nuwanidu Fernando 56* (39); Noor Ahmad 2/34 (4 overs)

Dambulla Aura won by 10 runs
Pallekele International Cricket Stadium, Pallekele
Umpires: Ravindra Kottahachchi (SL) and Gazi Sohel (Ban)
Player of the match: Kusal Mendis (Dambulla Aura)

- Colombo Strikers won the toss and elected to field.

Match 9
5 August 2023
19:30
Scorecard

Jaffna Kings; 117/9 (20 overs)	v	B-Love Kandy; 118/2 (13 overs)
Dunith Wellalage 38* (27); Wanindu Hasaranga 3/9 (4 overs)		Wanindu Hasaranga 52* (22); Nandre Burger 1/17 (2 overs)

B-Love Kandy won by 8 wickets
Pallekele International Cricket Stadium, Pallekele
Umpires: Kumar Dharmasena (SL) and Ruchira Palliyaguruge (SL)
Player of the match: Wanindu Hasaranga (B-Love Kandy)

- B-Love Kandy won the toss and elected to field.

Match 10
7 August 2023
15:00
Scorecard

Galle Titans; 188/3 (20 overs)	v	Colombo Strikers; 189/3 (19.5 overs)
Tim Seifert 54* (35); Lakshan Sandakan 1/29 (4 overs)		Babar Azam 104 (59); Tabraiz Shamsi 2/27 (4 overs)

Colombo Strikers won by 7 wickets
Pallekele International Cricket Stadium, Pallekele
Umpires: Kumar Dharmasena (SL) and Prageeth Rambukwella (SL)
Player of the match: Babar Azam (Colombo Strikers)

- Colombo Strikers won the toss and elected to field.

Match 11
7 August 2023
19:30
Scorecard

Dambulla Aura; 134/8 (20 overs)	v	Jaffna Kings; 125/7 (20 overs)
Kusal Perera 41 (36); Shoaib Malik 2/13 (4 overs)		Shoaib Malik 74* (53); Hasan Ali 3/20 (4 overs)

Dambulla Aura won by 9 runs
Pallekele International Cricket Stadium, Pallekele
Umpires: Chamara de Soysa (SL) and Ruchira Palliyaguruge (SL)
Player of the match: Hasan Ali (Dambulla Aura)

- Jaffna Kings won the toss and elected to field.

Match 12
8 August 2023
15:00
Scorecard

B-Love Kandy; 203/5 (20 overs)	v	Galle Titans; 114 (16.4 overs)
Wanindu Hasaranga 64 (27); Lahiru Samarakoon 2/31 (4 overs)		Lahiru Samarakoon 36 (25); Wanindu Hasaranga 4/17 (3.4 overs)

B-Love Kandy won by 89 runs
Pallekele International Cricket Stadium, Pallekele
Umpires: Kumar Dharmasena (SL) and Ravindra Kottahachchi (SL)
Player of the match: Wanindu Hasaranga (B-Love Kandy)

- Galle Titans won the toss and elected to field.

Match 13
8 August 2023
19:30
Scorecard

Colombo Strikers; 146/8 (20 overs)	v	Jaffna Kings; 150/4 (14.3 overs)
Pathum Nissanka 36 (25); Dunith Wellalage 2/9 (3 overs)		Nishan Madushka 46 (32); Naseem Shah 2/22 (3.3 overs)

Jaffna Kings won by 6 wickets
Pallekele International Cricket Stadium, Pallekele
Umpires: Chandrika Amarasinghe (SL) and Lyndon Hannibal (SL)
Player of the match: Dunith Wellalage (Jaffna Kings)

- Colombo Strikers won the toss and elected to bat.

Match 14
11 August 2023
19:30
Scorecard

Galle Titans; 133/9 (20 overs)	v	Dambulla Aura; 134/3 (17.4 overs)
Dasun Shanaka 36 (26); Dushan Hemantha 2/31 (4 overs)		Avishka Fernando 70* (49); Lahiru Kumara 2/31 (4 overs)

Dambulla Aura won by 7 wickets
R. Premadasa Stadium, Colombo
Umpires: Chandrika Amarasinghe (SL) and Prageeth Rambukwella (SL)
Player of the match: Avishka Fernando (Dambulla Aura)

- Dambulla Aura won the toss and elected to field.

Match 15
12 August 2023
15:00
Scorecard

B-Love Kandy; 178/8 (20 overs)	v	Jaffna Kings; 170/6 (20 overs)
Mohammad Haris 81 (51); Nuwan Thushara 3/31 (4 overs)		Shoaib Malik 55* (37); Angelo Mathews 3/10 (3 overs)

B-Love Kandy won by 8 runs
R. Premadasa Stadium, Colombo
Umpires: Chamara de Soysa (SL) and Ruchira Palliyaguruge (SL)
Player of the match: Mohammad Haris (B-Love Kandy)

- B-Love Kandy won the toss and elected to field.

Match 16
12 August 2023
19:30
Scorecard

Dambulla Aura; 166/5 (20 overs)	v	Colombo Strikers; 116 (19.4 overs)
Ben McDermott 69* (46); Matheesha Pathirana 2/36 (4 overs)		Nuwanidu Fernando 21 (20); Hasan Ali 3/16 (4 overs)

Dambulla Aura won by 50 runs
R. Premadasa Stadium, Colombo
Umpires: Lyndon Hannibal (SL) and Ranmore Martinesz (SL)
Player of the match: Ben McDermott (Dambulla Aura)

- Dambulla Aura won the toss and elected to bat.

Match 17
13 August 2023
15:00
Scorecard

Jaffna Kings; 89 (20 overs)	v	Galle Titans; 90/3 (13.3 overs)
Dunith Wellalage 22 (31); Kasun Rajitha 4/20 (4 overs)		Tim Seifert 55 (42); Shoaib Malik 1/2 (0.3 overs)

Galle Titans won by 7 wickets
R. Premadasa Stadium, Colombo
Umpires: Ravindra Kottahachchi (SL) and Raveendra Wimalasiri (SL)
Player of the match: Kasun Rajitha (Galle Titans)

- Jaffna Kings won the toss and elected to bat.

Match 18
13 August 2023
19:30
Scorecard

Colombo Strikers; 169/9 (20 overs)	v	B-Love Kandy; 160/8 (20 overs)
Pathum Nissanka 51 (38); Wanindu Hasaranga 2/21 (4 overs)		Wanindu Hasaranga 40 (21); Matheesha Pathirana 2/32 (4 overs)

Colombo Strikers won by 9 runs
R. Premadasa Stadium, Colombo
Umpires: Ranmore Martinesz (SL) and Ruchira Palliyaguruge (SL)
Player of the match: Pathum Nissanka (Colombo Strikers)

- Colombo Strikers won the toss and elected to bat.

Match 19
14 August 2023
19:30
Scorecard

Dambulla Aura; 162/7 (20 overs)	v	B-Love Kandy; 142 (19.4 overs)
Avishka Fernando 41 (27); Nuwan Pradeep 3/35 (4 overs)		Dinesh Chandimal 50 (46); Dhananjaya de Silva 4/6 (2 overs)

Dambulla Aura won by 20 runs
R. Premadasa Stadium, Colombo
Umpires: Aleem Dar (Pak) and Ruchira Palliyaguruge (SL)
Player of the match: Dhananjaya de Silva (Dambulla Aura)

- B-Love Kandy won the toss and elected to field.

Match 20
15 August 2023
19:30
Scorecard

Colombo Strikers; 74 (15.4 overs)	v	Galle Titans; 75/2 (8.3 overs)
Nuwanidu Fernando 14 (11); Tabraiz Shamsi 4/20 (4 overs)		Lasith Croospulle 42* (25); Jeffrey Vandersay 1/18 (3 overs)

Galle Titans won by 8 wickets
R. Premadasa Stadium, Colombo
Umpires: Aleem Dar (Pak) and Lyndon Hannibal (SL)
Player of the match: Tabraiz Shamsi (Galle Titans)

- Galle Titans won the toss and elected to field.

== Playoffs ==
Qualifier 1 / Eliminator
17 August 2023 — Colombo
1	Dambulla Aura	147/4 (19.4 overs)
2	Galle Titans	146 (20 overs)
17 August 2023 — Colombo
3	B-Love Kandy	188/8 (20 overs)
4	Jaffna Kings	127 (17.2 overs)

Qualifier 2
19 August 2023 — Colombo
Q1L	Galle Titans	123/8 (20 overs)
EW	B-Love Kandy	157/7 (20 overs)

Final
20 August 2023 — Colombo
Q1W	Dambulla Aura	147/4 (20 overs)
Q2W	B-Love Kandy	151/5 (19.5 overs)

Qualifier 1
17 August 2023
15:00 (D/N)
Scorecard

Galle Titans; 146 (20 overs)	v	Dambulla Aura; 147/4 (19.4 overs)
Lasith Croospulle 80 (61); Hayden Kerr 3/18 (3 overs)		Kusal Perera 53 (39); Dasun Shanaka 1/1 (0.4 overs)

Dambulla Aura won by 6 wickets
R. Premadasa Stadium, Colombo
Umpires: Chandrika Amarasinghe (SL) and Ruchira Palliyaguruge (SL)
Player of the match: Kusal Mendis (Dambulla Aura)

- Dambulla Aura won the toss and elected to field.

Eliminator
17 August 2023
19:30 (N)
Scorecard

B-Love Kandy; 188/8 (20 overs)	v	Jaffna Kings; 127 (17.2 overs)
Mohammad Haris 79 (49); Nuwan Thushara 4/40 (4 overs)		Shoaib Malik 31 (23); Wanindu Hasaranga 6/9 (3.2 overs)

B-Love Kandy won by 61 runs
R. Premadasa Stadium, Colombo
Umpires: Aleem Dar (Pak) and Prageeth Rambukwella (SL)
Player of the match: Wanindu Hasaranga (B-Love Kandy)

- Jaffna Kings won the toss and elected to field.

Qualifier 2
19 August 2023
19:30 (N)
Scorecard

B-Love Kandy; 157/7 (20 overs)	v	Galle Titans; 123/8 (20 overs)
Wanindu Hasaranga 48 (30); Lahiru Kumara 2/21 (4 overs)		Sonal Dinusha 28 (32); Mohammad Hasnain 2/8 (3 overs)

B-Love Kandy won by 34 runs
R. Premadasa Stadium, Colombo
Umpires: Aleem Dar (Pak) and Raveendra Wimalasiri (SL)
Player of the match: Wanindu Hasaranga (B-Love Kandy)

- B-Love Kandy won the toss and elected to bat.

=== Final ===
Final
20 August 2023
19:30 (N)
Scorecard

Dambulla Aura; 147/4 (20 overs)	v	B-Love Kandy; 151/5 (19.5 overs)
Dhananjaya de Silva 40 (29); Chaturanga de Silva 2/25 (4 overs)		Kamindu Mendis 44 (37); Noor Ahmad 3/27 (4 overs)

B-Love Kandy won by 5 wickets
R. Premadasa Stadium, Colombo
Umpires: Aleem Dar (Pak) and Kumar Dharmasena (SL)
Player of the match: Angelo Mathews (B-Love Kandy)

- Dambulla Aura won the toss and elected to bat.

== Statistics ==
=== Most runs ===
Player	Team	Matches	Runs.	High score
Wanindu Hasaranga	B-Love Kandy	10	279	64
Babar Azam	Colombo Strikers	8	261	104
Dinesh Chandimal	B-Love Kandy	10	259	50
Avishka Fernando	Dambulla Aura	10	244	70
Sadeera Samarawickrama	Dambulla Aura	10	234	59

- Source: ESPNcricinfo

=== Most wickets ===
Player	Team	Matches	Wickets	Best bowling
Wanindu Hasaranga	B-Love Kandy	10	19	6/9
Nuwan Pradeep	B-Love Kandy	7	14	3/21
Noor Ahmad	Dambulla Aura	8	12	3/27
Matheesha Pathirana	Colombo Strikers	8	12	3/24
Tabraiz Shamsi	Galle Titans	9	12	4/20

- Source: ESPNCricinfo
