= National Super League 4-Day Tournament =

Cricket tournament

- Countries: Sri Lanka
- Administrator: Sri Lanka Cricket
- Format: First-class cricket
- First edition: 2022
- Latest edition: 2026
- Next edition: 2027
- Tournament format: Double round-robin and final
- Number of teams: 5
- Current champion: Galle District (2nd title)
- Most successful: Galle District (2 titles)
- Most runs: Ahan Wickramasinghe (1004)
- Most wickets: Shashika Dulshan (39)
- 2026 National Super League 4-Day Tournament

The National Super League 4-Day Tournament is a domestic first-class cricket competition, which is held annually in Sri Lanka. Five cricket teams representing five districts of the country take part in the tournament. The league is organized by the Sri Lanka Cricket (SLC) beginning in the 2022 season. In January 2022, the SLC launched the tournament. The squads for the competition are announced based on the performances in the Major League Tournament, with 26 clubs clustered under five teams. The tournament serves as the criteria to select players for Sri Lanka's Test squad. The tournament runs alongside the National Super League Limited Over Tournament.

== Teams ==
Team	Clubs	Titles	Runners-up
Colombo District	Saracens Sports Club; Singhalese Sports Club; Negombo Cricket Club; Sebastianites Cricket and Athletic Club; Sri Lanka Police Sports Club	0	0
Dambulla District	Colombo Cricket Club; Burgher Recreation Club; Sri Lanka Navy Sports Club; Badureliya Sports Club; Kurunegala Youth Cricket Club; Nugegoda Sports and Welfare Club	1	1
Galle District	Colts Cricket Club; Sri Lanka Army Sports Club; Panadura Sports Club; Galle Cricket Club; Moors Sports Club	2	1
Jaffna District	Tamil Union Cricket and Athletic Club; Ragama Cricket Club; Lankan Cricket Club; Kalutara Town Club; Bloomfield Cricket and Athletic Club	0	1
Kandy District	Nondescripts Cricket Club; Chilaw Marians Cricket Club; Ace Capital Cricket Club; Sri Lanka Air Force Sports Club; Kandy Customs Sports Club	1	1

== Tournament seasons and results ==
Season	Winner	Runner-up	Leading run-scorer	Leading wicket-taker	Ref
2021–22	Kandy District	Jaffna District	Kamindu Mendis (886)	Prabath Jayasuriya (23)	
2022–23	Dambulla District	Galle District	Minod Bhanuka (456)	Shashika Dulshan (22)	
2023–24	Galle District	Kandy District	Oshada Fernando (885)	Nishan Peiris (35)	
2024–25	Galle District	Dambulla District	Ravindu Rasantha (563)	Akila Dananjaya (37)	
2026	Dambulla District	Colombo District			
