= New Zealand cricket team in Sri Lanka in 2024–25 =

International cricket tour

	Sri Lanka	New Zealand
- Dates: 18 September – 19 November 2024
Captains	Dhananjaya de Silva (Tests); Charith Asalanka (ODIs & T20Is)	Tim Southee (Tests); Mitchell Santner (ODIs & T20Is)

Test series
- Result: Sri Lanka won the 2-match series 2–0
Most runs	Kamindu Mendis (309)	Rachin Ravindra (153)
Most wickets	Prabath Jayasuriya (18)	William O'Rourke (8); Ajaz Patel (8)
- Player of the series: Prabath Jayasuriya (SL)

One Day International series
- Results: Sri Lanka won the 3-match series 2–0
Most runs	Kusal Mendis (217)	Will Young (130)
Most wickets	Maheesh Theekshana (5)	Michael Bracewell (5)
- Player of the series: Kusal Mendis (SL)

Twenty20 International series
- Results: 2-match series drawn 1–1
Most runs	Pathum Nissanka (71)	Will Young (49)
Most wickets	Wanindu Hasaranga (6)	Glenn Phillips (4); Zak Foulkes (4)
- Player of the series: Wanindu Hasaranga (SL)

The New Zealand cricket team toured Sri Lanka in September and toured again in November 2024 to play the Sri Lanka cricket team. The tour consisted of two Test, three One Day International (ODI) and three Twenty20 International (T20I) matches. The Test series formed part of the 2023–2025 ICC World Test Championship. In November 2023, Sri Lanka Cricket (SLC) announced its international calendar for 2024 and confirmed the bilateral series. New Zealand last toured Sri Lanka in 2019.

On 23 August 2024, SLC announced that, the first Test would be played across six days, with a rest day set for 21 September, due to the Presidential Election.

Sri Lanka's first-innings total of 602 for 5 in the second Test was their first 500-plus total against New Zealand in the format. With that accomplishment they also became the first team in Test cricket with 600-plus totals against nine opponents.

== Squads ==
Sri Lanka			New Zealand		
Tests	ODIs	T20Is	Tests	ODIs	T20Is
Dhananjaya de Silva (c); Dinesh Chandimal (wk); Asitha Fernando; Oshada Fernando; ~~Vishwa Fernando~~; Prabath Jayasuriya; Dimuth Karunaratne; Lahiru Kumara; Angelo Mathews; Kamindu Mendis; Kusal Mendis (wk); Ramesh Mendis; Pathum Nissanka; Nishan Peiris; Milan Rathnayake; Sadeera Samarawickrama (wk); Jeffrey Vandersay	Charith Asalanka (c); Asitha Fernando (Note: In squad for first and second ODI only.); Avishka Fernando; Nuwanidu Fernando (Note: In squad for third ODI only.); ~~Wanindu Hasaranga~~; Dushan Hemantha; Janith Liyanage; Dilshan Madushanka; Nishan Madushka; Eshan Malinga; Kamindu Mendis; Kusal Mendis (wk); Pathum Nissanka; Kusal Perera (wk); Sadeera Samarawickrama (wk); Mohamed Shiraz; Maheesh Theekshana; Lahiru Udara (wk); Jeffrey Vandersay; Dunith Wellalage; Chamindu Wickramasinghe	Charith Asalanka (c); Dinesh Chandimal (wk); Asitha Fernando; Avishka Fernando; Binura Fernando; Wanindu Hasaranga; Kamindu Mendis; Kusal Mendis (wk); Pathum Nissanka; Matheesha Pathirana; Kusal Perera (wk); Bhanuka Rajapaksa; Maheesh Theekshana; Nuwan Thushara; Jeffrey Vandersay; Dunith Wellalage; Chamindu Wickramasinghe	Tim Southee (c); Tom Latham (vc, wk); Tom Blundell (wk); Michael Bracewell; Devon Conway (wk); Matt Henry; Daryl Mitchell; William O'Rourke; Ajaz Patel; Glenn Phillips; Rachin Ravindra; Mitchell Santner; Ben Sears; Kane Williamson; Will Young	Mitchell Santner (c); Michael Bracewell; Mark Chapman; Josh Clarkson; Jacob Duffy; ~~Lockie Ferguson~~; Zak Foulkes; Dean Foxcroft; Mitchell Hay (wk); Adam Milne; Henry Nicholls; Glenn Phillips; Tim Robinson; Nathan Smith; Ish Sodhi; Will Young	Mitchell Santner (c); Michael Bracewell; Mark Chapman; Josh Clarkson; Jacob Duffy; Lockie Ferguson; Zak Foulkes; Dean Foxcroft; Mitchell Hay (wk); Henry Nicholls; Glenn Phillips; Tim Robinson; Nathan Smith; Ish Sodhi; Will Young

Ahead of the second Test, Sri Lanka drafted in Nishan Peiris as a replacement for Vishwa Fernando, who had a leg injury.

On 11 November, Lockie Ferguson was ruled out of the ODI series with a calf injury, and Adam Milne named as his replacement.

On 12 November, Wanindu Hasaranga was ruled out of the ODI series with a left hamstring injury, and Dushan Hemantha added to the squad. On 18 November, Sri Lanka added Nuwanidu Fernando, Lahiru Udara, and Eshan Malinga into the squad for the final ODI, giving rest to Kusal Mendis, Pathum Nissanka, Kamindu Mendis, and Asitha Fernando.

== Test series ==
=== 1st Test ===
18–23 September 2024
Scorecard

Sri Lanka	v	New Zealand
305 (91.5 overs); Kamindu Mendis 114 (173); William O'Rourke 5/55 (18.5 overs)		340 (90.5 overs); Tom Latham 70 (111); Prabath Jayasuriya 4/136 (40 overs)
309 (94.2 overs); Dimuth Karunaratne 83 (127); Ajaz Patel 6/90 (30 overs)		211 (71.4 overs); Rachin Ravindra 92 (168); Prabath Jayasuriya 5/68 (30.4 overs)

Sri Lanka won by 63 runs
Galle International Stadium, Galle
Umpires: Michael Gough (Eng) and Ahsan Raza (Pak)
Player of the match: Prabath Jayasuriya (SL)

- Sri Lanka won the toss and elected to bat.
- Rest day on 21 September for the Presidential Election in Sri Lanka.
- World Test Championship points: Sri Lanka 12, New Zealand 0.

=== 2nd Test ===
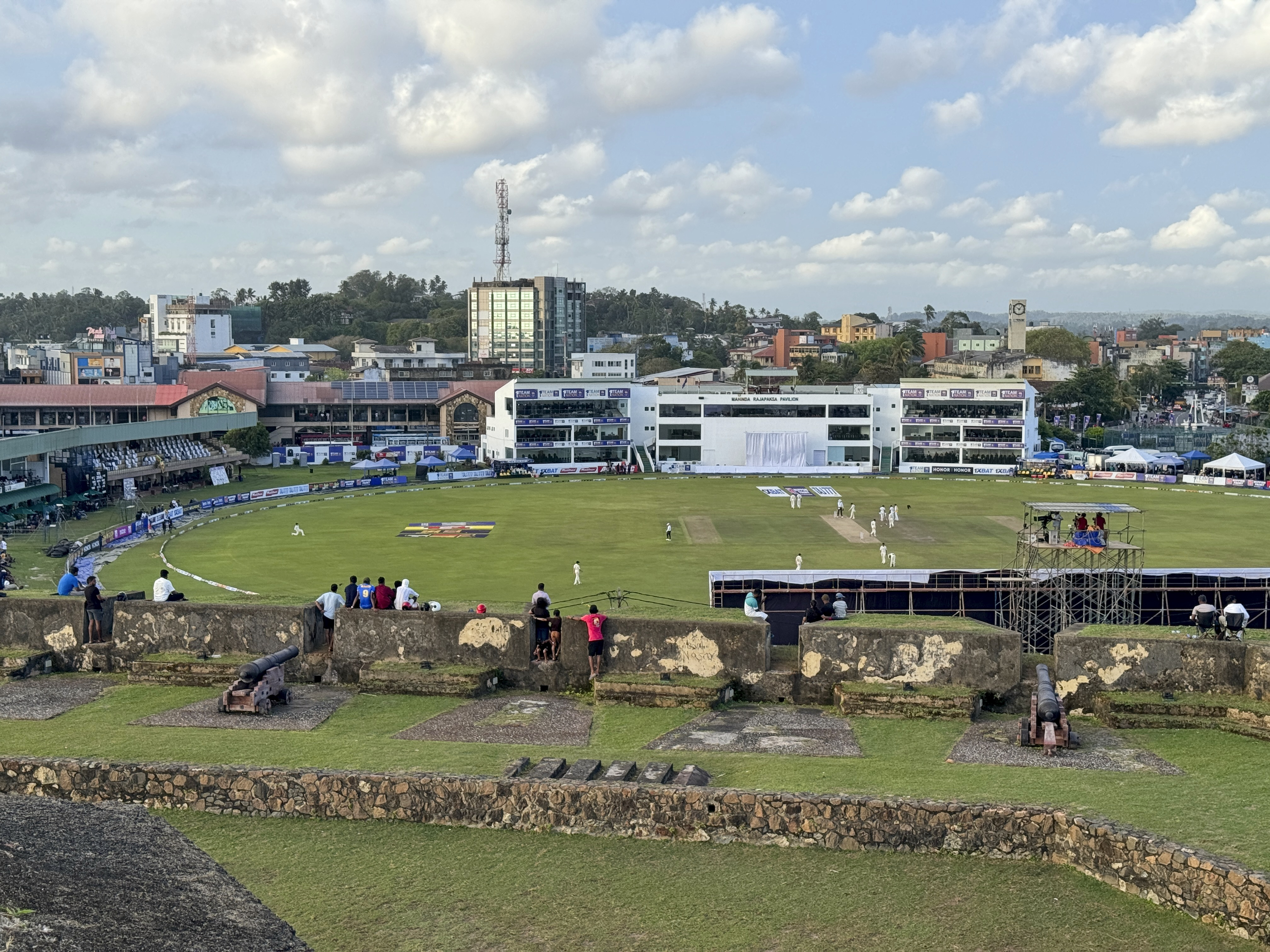
The first day's play of the 2nd Test match

26–29 September 2024
Scorecard

Sri Lanka	v	New Zealand
602/5d (163.4 overs); Kamindu Mendis 182* (250); Glenn Phillips 3/141 (38 overs)		88 (39.5 overs); Mitchell Santner 29 (51); Prabath Jayasuriya 6/42 (18 overs)
		360 (81.4 overs) (f/o); Glenn Phillips 78 (99); Nishan Peiris 6/170 (33.4 overs)

Sri Lanka won by an innings and 154 runs
Galle International Stadium, Galle
Umpires: Michael Gough (Eng) and Nitin Menon (Ind)
Player of the match: Kamindu Mendis (SL)

- Sri Lanka won the toss and elected to bat.
- Nishan Peiris (SL) made his Test debut.
- Kamindu Mendis (SL) scored his 1,000th run in Tests, and became the joint-third fastest to reach there in terms of number of innings (13).
- Nishan Peiris (SL) took his first five-wicket haul in Tests.
- World Test Championship points: Sri Lanka 12, New Zealand 0.

== T20I series ==
=== 1st T20I ===
9 November 2024
19:00 (N)
Scorecard

New Zealand; 135 (19.3 overs)	v	Sri Lanka; 140/6 (19 overs)
Zak Foulkes 27* (16); Dunith Wellalage 3/20 (3.3 overs)		Charith Asalanka 35* (28); Zak Foulkes 3/20 (3 overs)

Sri Lanka won by 4 wickets
Rangiri Dambulla International Stadium, Dambulla
Umpires: Lyndon Hannibal (SL) and Raveendra Wimalasiri (SL)
Player of the match: Charith Asalanka (SL)

- New Zealand won the toss and elected to bat.
- Mitchell Hay (NZ) made his T20I debut.
- Kusal Perera became the highest run-getter in T20Is for Sri Lanka surpassing Tillakaratne Dilshan.

=== 2nd T20I ===
10 November 2024
19:00 (N)
Scorecard

New Zealand; 108 (19.3 overs)	v	Sri Lanka; 103 (19.5 overs)
Will Young 30 (32); Wanindu Hasaranga 4/17 (4 overs)		Pathum Nissanka 52 (51); Glenn Phillips 3/6 (1.5 overs)

New Zealand won by 5 runs
Rangiri Dambulla International Stadium, Dambulla
Umpires: Ruchira Palliyaguruge (SL) and Prageeth Rambukwella (SL)
Player of the match: Lockie Ferguson (NZ)

- Sri Lanka won the toss and elected to field.
- Lockie Ferguson (NZ) took a hat-trick.
- Mitchell Hay (NZ) broke the record for the most dismissals (6) by a wicket-keeper in a T20I innings.

== ODI series ==
=== 1st ODI ===
13 November 2024
14:30 (D/N)
Scorecard

Sri Lanka; 324/5 (49.2 overs)	v	New Zealand; 175/9 (27 overs)
Kusal Mendis 143 (128); Jacob Duffy 3/41 (8.2 overs)		Will Young 48 (46); Dilshan Madushanka 3/39 (4 overs)

Sri Lanka won by 45 runs (DLS method)
Rangiri Dambulla International Stadium, Dambulla
Umpires: Rod Tucker (AUS) and Raveendra Wimalasiri (SL)
Player of the match: Kusal Mendis (SL)

- Sri Lanka won the toss and elected to bat.
- Rain interrupted Sri Lanka's innings at 49.2 overs.
- New Zealand were set a revised target of 221 from 27 overs due to rain.
- Mitchell Hay, Tim Robinson and Nathan Smith (NZ) all made their ODI debuts.

=== 2nd ODI ===
17 November 2024
14:30 (D/N)
Scorecard

New Zealand; 209 (45.1 overs)	v	Sri Lanka; 210/7 (46 overs)
Mark Chapman 76 (81); Maheesh Theekshana 3/31 (9.1 overs)		Kusal Mendis 74* (102); Michael Bracewell 4/36 (10 overs)

Sri Lanka won by 3 wickets (DLS method)
Pallekele International Cricket Stadium, Kandy
Umpires: Prageeth Rambukwella (SL) and Langton Rusere (Zim)
Player of the match: Kusal Mendis (SL)

- Sri Lanka won the toss and elected to field.
- The match was reduced to 47 overs per side due to rain.
- It was Sri Lanka's first ODI series win against New Zealand since 2012.

=== 3rd ODI ===
19 November 2024
14:30 (D/N)
Scorecard

New Zealand; 112/1 (21 overs)	v	Sri Lanka
Will Young 56* (68); Mohamed Shiraz 1/23 (5 overs)

No result
Pallekele International Cricket Stadium, Kandy
Umpires: Ruchira Palliyaguruge (SL) and Rod Tucker (Aus)

- New Zealand won the toss and elected to bat.
- No further play was possible due to rain.
- Chamindu Wickramasinghe (SL) and Zak Foulkes (NZ) both made their ODI debuts.
- Sri Lanka records its longest winning streak in ODIs in bilateral series played at home by winning six consecutive series.
