= Kandy District cricket team =

Provincial cricket team in Sri Lanka

Kandy District
- League: National Super League

Personnel
- Captain: Pathum Nissanka

Team information
- City: Kandy
- Founded: 2017
- Home ground: Pallekele International Cricket Stadium

History
- First-class debut: Dambulla District in 2018 at Chilaw Marians Cricket Club Ground
- NSL 4-Day wins: 1
- NSL Limited Over wins: 0

The Kandy District cricket team plays first-class and List A cricket in the Sri Lankan inter-provincial competitions. Though it is a district cricket team, it has no geographical base, rather 5 of the 26 clubs are clustered under this team. The team takes part in the National Super League 4-Day Tournament and the National Super League Limited Over Tournament. Pathum Nissanka is the current captain of the team for the 2024 season.

== Background ==
The team is made up of the top performers of the Major League Tournament and the Premier Limited Overs Tournament. Previously, the team used to take part in the inter-provincial tournaments till 2019. The team was formed in March 2017, when the Sri Lanka Cricket launched the Super Four Provincial Tournament for both longer version and limited overs cricket and announced Kandy District as one of the teams.

The inaugural List A match played by Kandy District was held on 15 March 2017 during the 2016–17 Districts One Day Tournament. The team competed in a first-class match for the first time on 30 March 2018, against Dambulla District in the 2017–18 Super Four Provincial Tournament. The first Twenty20 match was played by the team on 21 August 2018, against Dambulla in the 2018 SLC T20 League.

In January 2022, the SLC announced the addition of National Super League for both four-day and one-day cricket to its domestic structure, marking the return of Kandy in domestic cricket. Kandy District were crowned as the champions of the inaugural season of NSL 4-Day after the final match against Jaffna District was drawn and Kandy District won on first innings total.

== Formation ==
The team is formed of the following clubs:

- Nondescripts Cricket Club
- Chilaw Marians Cricket Club
- Ace Capital Cricket Club
- Sri Lanka Air Force Sports Club
- Kandy Customs Sports Club

== Current squad ==
The following squad was announced for the 2024 National Super League 4-Day Tournament.

Player name	Club
Pathum Nissanka (c)	Nondescripts Cricket Club
Sahan Arachchige (vc)	Nondescripts Cricket Club
Sithum Disanayaka	Ace Capital
Nimasra Attaragalla	Ace Capital
Sithara Gimhan	Ace Capital
Pawantha Weerasinghe	Ace Capital
Gihan Rathnayake	Ace Capital
Sakuna Liyanage	Ace Capital
Wanuja Sahan	Ace Capital
Roshan Jayatissa	Ace Capital
Kasun Adhikari	Chilaw Marians
Lasith Lakshan	Chilaw Marians
Nipun Premaratna	Chilaw Marians
Raveen Yasas	Chilaw Marians
Sahan Kosala	Kandy Customs
Lahiru Udara	Nondescripts Cricket Club
Ahan Wickramasinghe	Nondescripts Cricket Club
Kamil Mishara	Nondescripts Cricket Club
Kaveen Bandara	Nondescripts Cricket Club
Niroshan Dickwella	Nondescripts Cricket Club
Chamika Karunaratne	Nondescripts Cricket Club
Chamika Gunasekara	Nondescripts Cricket Club
Lahiru Kumara	Nondescripts Cricket Club
Ashian Daniel	Nondescripts Cricket Club
Lasith Embuldeniya	Nondescripts Cricket Club
Nipun Ransika	Nondescripts Cricket Club

== Seasons ==
=== Super Four Provincial Tournament ===
Season	League standings							Ref
Season	P	W	L	D	A	Pts	Pos	Ref
2017–18	3	0	0	3	0	22.55	3rd	

=== National Super League 4-Day ===
Season	League standings							Notes	Ref
Season	P	W	L	D	A	Pts	Pos	Notes	Ref
2021–22	4	0	1	3	0	56.51	2nd	Champions	
2022–23	4	1	2	0	1	27.775	4th		
2024	8	3	3	2	0	92.585	2nd		

=== National Super League Limited Over Tournament ===
Season	League standings							Notes	Ref
Season	P	W	L	T	A	Pts	Pos	Notes	Ref
2021–22	8	6	1	0	1	30	1st		
2022–23	8	2	5	0	1	11	4th		
2023–24	4	2	2	0	0	6	2nd		

== Honours ==
- National Super League 4-Day Tournament:
  - Winners (1): 2021–22
