= Australian cricket team in Sri Lanka in 2022 =

International cricket tour

| | Sri Lanka | Australia |
- Dates: 7 June – 12 July 2022
| Captains | Dimuth Karunaratne (Tests); Dasun Shanaka (ODIs & T20Is) | Pat Cummins (Tests); Aaron Finch (ODIs & T20Is) |

Test series
- Result: 2-match series drawn 1–1
| Most runs | Dinesh Chandimal (219) | Steve Smith (151) |
| Most wickets | Prabath Jayasuriya (12) | Nathan Lyon (11) |
- Player of the series: Dinesh Chandimal (SL)

One Day International series
- Results: Sri Lanka won the 5-match series 3–2
| Most runs | Kusal Mendis (249) | Glenn Maxwell (160) |
| Most wickets | Dunith Wellalage (9) | Pat Cummins (8) |
- Player of the series: Kusal Mendis (SL)

Twenty20 International series
- Results: Australia won the 3-match series 2–1
| Most runs | Charith Asalanka (103) | David Warner (130) |
| Most wickets | Wanindu Hasaranga (5) | Josh Hazlewood (6) |
- Player of the series: Aaron Finch (Aus)

The Australian cricket team toured Sri Lanka in June and July 2022 to play two Tests, five One Day Internationals (ODIs) and three Twenty20 International (T20Is) matches. The Test series formed part of the 2021–2023 ICC World Test Championship. Both cricket boards confirmed the fixtures for the tour in March 2022.

Australia won the opening T20I match by ten wickets, with Aaron Finch and David Warner making an unbeaten 134-run partnership. Australia won the second T20I by three wickets to win the series with a match to play. Sri Lanka won the third T20I by four wickets, after an unbeaten half century from their captain Dasun Shanaka, with Australia winning the series 2–1.

In the ODI series, Australia won the opening match by two wickets, with Glenn Maxwell making an unbeaten 80 from 51 balls. Sri Lanka won the second ODI by 26 runs, following a batting collapse by Australia, to level the series. Sri Lanka won the third ODI by six wickets, after Australia had scored 291/6, with Pathum Nissanka scoring his first century in the format. It was Sri Lanka's highest successful run chase at the R. Premadasa Stadium, and their highest successful run chase against Australia in ODI cricket. Sri Lanka won the fourth match by four runs to win their first ODI bilateral series at home against Australia since 1992. Australia won the fifth and final ODI by four wickets, with Sri Lanka winning the series 3–2.

In the second innings of the first Test, Sri Lanka were bowled out inside one session, being dismissed for 113 runs in 22.5 overs. Needing only five runs for victory, David Warner hit the winning runs from four balls, with Australia winning the Test by ten wickets before the lunch break on the third day. Sri Lanka won the second Test by an innings and 39 runs to draw the series 1–1. It was the first time that Sri Lanka had beaten Australia by an innings in a Test match. Dinesh Chandimal scored his first double century in a Test match with 206 not out, and Prabath Jayasuriya took the best bowling figures for a Sri Lanka player on debut, with 12 for 177.

== Squads ==
| Tests | | ODIs | | T20Is | |
| Sri Lanka | Australia | Sri Lanka | Australia | Sri Lanka | Australia |
|---|---|---|---|---|---|
| Dimuth Karunaratne (c); Dinesh Chandimal (wk); Dhananjaya de Silva; Niroshan Dickwella (wk); Lasith Embuldeniya; Asitha Fernando; Oshada Fernando; Vishwa Fernando; Prabath Jayasuriya; Praveen Jayawickrama; Chamika Karunaratne; Dilshan Madushanka; Lakshitha Manasinghe; Angelo Mathews; Kusal Mendis; Pathum Nissanka; Kamindu Mendis; Ramesh Mendis; Kasun Rajitha; Maheesh Theekshana; Jeffrey Vandersay; Dunith Wellalage | Pat Cummins (c); Steve Smith (vc); Ashton Agar; Scott Boland; Alex Carey; Cameron Green; Josh Hazlewood; Travis Head; Jon Holland; Josh Inglis; Usman Khawaja; Marnus Labuschagne; Nathan Lyon; Mitchell Marsh; Glenn Maxwell; Mitchell Starc; Mitchell Swepson; David Warner | Dasun Shanaka (c); Charith Asalanka; Dushmantha Chameera; Dinesh Chandimal; Dhananjaya de Silva; Niroshan Dickwella; Asitha Fernando; Danushka Gunathilaka; Wanindu Hasaranga; Praveen Jayawickrama; Chamika Karunaratne; Pramod Madushan; Lahiru Madushanka; Kusal Mendis; Ramesh Mendis; Pathum Nissanka; Bhanuka Rajapaksa; Maheesh Theekshana; Nuwan Thushara; Jeffrey Vandersay; Dunith Wellalage | Aaron Finch (c); Ashton Agar; Alex Carey; Pat Cummins; Cameron Green; Josh Hazlewood; Travis Head; Josh Inglis; Matthew Kuhnemann; Marnus Labuschagne; Mitchell Marsh; Glenn Maxwell; Jhye Richardson; Kane Richardson; Steve Smith; ~~Mitchell Starc~~; Marcus Stoinis; Mitchell Swepson; David Warner | Dasun Shanaka (c); Charith Asalanka; Dushmantha Chameera; Asitha Fernando; Nuwanidu Fernando; Danushka Gunathilaka; Wanindu Hasaranga; Praveen Jayawickrama; Chamika Karunaratne; Pramod Madushan; Lahiru Madushanka; Kusal Mendis; Ramesh Mendis; Pathum Nissanka; Matheesha Pathirana; Bhanuka Rajapaksa; Kasun Rajitha; Lakshan Sandakan; Maheesh Theekshana; Nuwan Thushara | Aaron Finch (c); ~~Sean Abbott~~; Ashton Agar; Josh Hazlewood; Josh Inglis; Mitchell Marsh; Glenn Maxwell; Jhye Richardson; Kane Richardson; Steve Smith; Mitchell Starc; Marcus Stoinis; Mitchell Swepson; David Warner; Matthew Wade |

Sri Lanka also named Jeffrey Vandersay and Niroshan Dickwella as reserves for the T20I series. Kasun Rajitha and Matheesha Pathirana were both ruled out of Sri Lanka's squad for the final T20I match, with Asitha Fernando and Pramod Madushan named as their replacements. Wanindu Hasaranga was ruled out of Sri Lanka's ODI squad for the second match after suffering a groin injury. Sri Lanka also named Dunith Wellalage and Lakshitha Rasanjana as reserves in their Test squad. Praveen Jayawickrama was ruled out of Sri Lanka's squad for the second Test after he tested positive for COVID-19. On the day before the second Test, Dhananjaya de Silva, Asitha Fernando and Jeffrey Vandersay were also ruled out of the match after testing positive for COVID-19. Sri Lanka added Prabath Jayasuriya, Lakshitha Manasinghe, Maheesh Theekshana and Dunith Wellalage to their squad for the second Test.

Australia's Sean Abbott was ruled out of their T20I squad after breaking a finger in the nets. Mitchell Starc suffered a hand injury during the first T20I match, which ruled him out of the white-ball matches. Jhye Richardson was added to Australia's ODI squad as cover for Starc. Mitchell Marsh was ruled out of Australia's squad for the final T20I match with a calf strain, with Kane Richardson added to their ODI squad as cover. Marcus Stoinis suffered a side strain during the first ODI match, and was ruled out of the rest of the series. As a result, Matthew Kuhnemann and Travis Head were added to Australia's ODI squad. However, Travis Head was ruled out of the fifth and final ODI match due to a hamstring injury. As a result of Head's injury, Glenn Maxwell was added to Australia's Test squad. Ashton Agar was ruled out of Australia's squad for the second Test with Jon Holland named as his replacement.

== Tour matches ==
For the tour to Sri Lanka, Cricket Australia also named a squad for the Australia A team, with two one-day matches and two first-class matches being played.

8 June 2022
9:45
Scorecard

| Sri Lanka A 297/7 (50 overs) | v | Australia A 298/3 (47.4 overs) |
| Dhananjaya de Silva 68 (70); Todd Murphy 2/53 (10 overs) | | Cameron Green 119* (111); Dunith Wellalage 2/55 (8 overs) |

Australia A won by 7 wickets
Singhalese Sports Club Cricket Ground, Colombo
Umpires: Hemantha Boteju (SL) and Ranmore Martinesz (SL)

- Australia A won the toss and elected to field.
- Dilshan Madushanka (Sri Lanka A) made his List A debut.

10 June 2022
9:45
Scorecard

| Australia A 312 (48.4 overs) | v | Sri Lanka A 315/6 (48.5 overs) |
| Travis Head 110 (86); Pramod Madushan 4/50 (8.4 overs) | | Niroshan Dickwella 83 (73); Matthew Kuhnemann 3/43 (10 overs) |

Sri Lanka A won by 4 wickets
Singhalese Sports Club Cricket Ground, Colombo
Umpires: Ravindra Kottahachchi (SL) and Ranmore Martinesz (SL)

- Australia A won the toss and elected to bat.

14–17 June 2022
Scorecard

| Australia A | v | Sri Lanka A |
| 379 (88.1 overs); Josh Philippe 94 (102); Dilshan Madushanka 4/62 (14.1 overs) | | 274 (79.1 overs); Nuwanidu Fernando 86 (140); Todd Murphy 4/67 (23 overs) |
| 212/5d (46 overs); Josh Philippe 69 (70); Lakshitha Manasinghe 2/83 (17 overs) | | 249 (72 overs); Sadeera Samarawickrama 105 (146); Tanveer Sangha 4/56 (13 overs) |

Australia A won by 68 runs
Mahinda Rajapaksa International Cricket Stadium, Hambantota
Umpires: Susantha Dissanayake (SL) and Deepal Gunawardene (SL)

- Australia A won the toss and elected to bat.
- Travis Head and Matthew Kuhnemann (Australia A) were replaced by Jimmy Peirson and Tanveer Sangha respectively on day 2.

21–24 June 2022
Scorecard

| Sri Lanka A | v | Australia A |
| 330/9d (90 overs); Nipun Dananjaya 92 (130); Scott Boland 4/38 (16 overs) | | 254 (74.3 overs); Jimmy Peirson 67* (112); Lakshitha Manasinghe 5/82 (25 overs) |
| 290 (87 overs); Nipun Dananjaya 77 (130); Scott Boland 3/51 (19 overs) | | 370/5 (95 overs); Jimmy Peirson 128* (189); Lakshitha Manasinghe 3/116 (32 overs) |

Australia A won by 5 wickets
Mahinda Rajapaksa International Cricket Stadium, Hambantota
Umpires: Keerthi Bandara (SL) and Pradeep Udawatta (SL)

- Sri Lanka A won the toss and elected to bat.

== T20I series ==
=== 1st T20I ===
7 June 2022
19:00 (N)
Scorecard

| Sri Lanka; 128 (19.3 overs) | v | Australia; 134/0 (14 overs) |
| Charith Asalanka 38 (34); Josh Hazlewood 4/16 (4 overs) | | David Warner 70* (44) |

Australia won by 10 wickets
R. Premadasa Stadium, Colombo
Umpires: Kumar Dharmasena (SL) and Lyndon Hannibal (SL)
Player of the match: Josh Hazlewood (Aus)

- Australia won the toss and elected to field.

=== 2nd T20I ===
8 June 2022
19:00 (N)
Scorecard

| Sri Lanka; 124/9 (20 overs) | v | Australia; 126/7 (17.5 overs) |
| Charith Asalanka 39 (33); Kane Richardson 4/30 (4 overs) | | Matthew Wade 26* (26); Wanindu Hasaranga 4/33 (4 overs) |

Australia won by 3 wickets
R. Premadasa Stadium, Colombo
Umpires: Kumar Dharmasena (SL) and Prageeth Rambukwella (SL)
Player of the match: Matthew Wade (Aus)

- Australia won the toss and elected to field.

=== 3rd T20I ===
11 June 2022
19:00 (N)
Scorecard

| Australia; 176/5 (20 overs) | v | Sri Lanka; 177/6 (19.5 overs) |
| David Warner 39 (33); Maheesh Theekshana 2/25 (4 overs) | | Dasun Shanaka 54* (25); Marcus Stoinis 2/8 (2 overs) |

Sri Lanka won by 4 wickets
Pallekele International Cricket Stadium, Kandy
Umpires: Kumar Dharmasena (SL) and Raveendra Wimalasiri (SL)
Player of the match: Dasun Shanaka (SL)

- Australia won the toss and elected to bat.

== ODI series ==
=== 1st ODI ===
14 June 2022
14:30 (D/N)
Scorecard

| Sri Lanka; 300/7 (50 overs) | v | Australia; 282/8 (42.3 overs) |
| Kusal Mendis 86* (87); Marnus Labuschagne 2/19 (3 overs) | | Glenn Maxwell 80* (51); Wanindu Hasaranga 4/58 (9 overs) |

Australia won by 2 wickets (DLS method)
Pallekele International Cricket Stadium, Kandy
Umpires: Kumar Dharmasena (SL) and Ruchira Palliyaguruge (SL)
Player of the match: Glenn Maxwell (Aus)

- Sri Lanka won the toss and elected to bat.
- Australia were set a revised target of 282 runs from 44 overs due to rain.
- Dunith Wellalage (SL) made his ODI debut.

=== 2nd ODI ===
16 June 2022
14:30 (D/N)
Scorecard

| Sri Lanka; 220/9 (47.4 overs) | v | Australia; 189 (37.1 overs) |
| Kusal Mendis 36 (41); Pat Cummins 4/35 (8.4 overs) | | David Warner 37 (51); Chamika Karunaratne 3/47 (7 overs) |

Sri Lanka won by 26 runs (DLS method)
Pallekele International Cricket Stadium, Kandy
Umpires: Kumar Dharmasena (SL) and Raveendra Wimalasiri (SL)
Player of the match: Chamika Karunaratne (SL)

- Australia won the toss and elected to field.
- Australia were set a revised target of 216 runs from 43 overs due to rain.
- Matthew Kuhnemann (Aus) made his ODI debut.

=== 3rd ODI ===
19 June 2022
14:30 (D/N)
Scorecard

| Australia; 291/6 (50 overs) | v | Sri Lanka; 292/4 (48.3 overs) |
| Travis Head 70* (65); Jeffrey Vandersay 3/49 (10 overs) | | Pathum Nissanka 137 (147); Jhye Richardson 2/39 (9 overs) |

Sri Lanka won by 6 wickets
R. Premadasa Stadium, Colombo
Umpires: Kumar Dharmasena (SL) and Lyndon Hannibal (SL)
Player of the match: Pathum Nissanka (SL)

- Australia won the toss and elected to bat.
- Pathum Nissanka (SL) scored his first century in ODIs.

=== 4th ODI ===
21 June 2022
14:30 (D/N)
Scorecard

| Sri Lanka; 258 (49 overs) | v | Australia; 254 (50 overs) |
| Charith Asalanka 110 (106); Mitchell Marsh 2/29 (7 overs) | | David Warner 99 (112); Chamika Karunaratne 2/19 (5 overs) |

Sri Lanka won by 4 runs
R. Premadasa Stadium, Colombo
Umpires: Ruchira Palliyaguruge (SL) and Prageeth Rambukwella (SL)
Player of the match: Charith Asalanka (SL)

- Australia won the toss and elected to field.
- Charith Asalanka (SL) scored his first century in ODIs.

=== 5th ODI ===
24 June 2022
14:30 (D/N)
Scorecard

| Sri Lanka; 160 (43.1 overs) | v | Australia; 164/6 (39.3 overs) |
| Chamika Karunaratne 75 (75); Pat Cummins 2/22 (6.1 overs) | | Alex Carey 45* (65); Dunith Wellalage 3/42 (10 overs) |

Australia won by 4 wickets
R. Premadasa Stadium, Colombo
Umpires: Kumar Dharmasena (SL) and Ruchira Palliyaguruge (SL)
Player of the match: Chamika Karunaratne (SL)

- Sri Lanka won the toss and elected to bat.
- Pramod Madushan (SL) and Josh Inglis (Aus) both made their ODI debuts.

== Test series ==
=== 1st Test ===
29 June – 3 July 2022 (Note: While five days of play were scheduled for each Test, the first Test reached a result in three days, and the second Test reached a result in four days.)
Scorecard

| Sri Lanka | v | Australia |
| 212 (59 overs); Niroshan Dickwella 58 (59); Nathan Lyon 5/90 (25 overs) | | 321 (70.5 overs); Cameron Green 77 (109); Ramesh Mendis 4/111 (32 overs) |
| 113 (22.5 overs); Dimuth Karunaratne 23 (20); Travis Head 4/10 (2.5 overs) | | 10/0 (0.4 overs); David Warner 10* (4) |

Australia won by 10 wickets
Galle International Stadium, Galle
Umpires: Kumar Dharmasena (SL) and Nitin Menon (Ind)
Player of the match: Cameron Green (Aus)

- Sri Lanka won the toss and elected to bat.
- No play was possible before lunch on day 2 due to rain.
- Jeffrey Vandersay (SL) made his Test debut.
- Nathan Lyon (Aus) equalled Shane Warne's record of the most five-wicket hauls by a visiting spin bowler in Asia, with nine.
- Oshada Fernando replaced Angelo Mathews as a COVID-19 substitute for Sri Lanka.
- World Test Championship points: Australia 12, Sri Lanka 0.

=== 2nd Test ===
8–12 July 2022
Scorecard

| Australia | v | Sri Lanka |
| 364 (110 overs); Steve Smith 145* (272); Prabath Jayasuriya 6/118 (36 overs) | | 554 (181 overs); Dinesh Chandimal 206* (326); Mitchell Starc 4/89 (29 overs) |
| 151 (41 overs); Marnus Labuschagne 32 (59); Prabath Jayasuriya 6/59 (16 overs) |

Sri Lanka won by an innings and 39 runs
Galle International Stadium, Galle
Umpires: Kumar Dharmasena (SL) and Michael Gough (Eng)
Player of the match: Prabath Jayasuriya (SL)

- Australia won the toss and elected to bat.
- Prabath Jayasuriya, Kamindu Mendis and Maheesh Theekshana (SL) all made their Test debuts.
- Prabath Jayasuriya (SL) became the second bowler for Sri Lanka to take two five-wicket hauls on Test debut.
- Oshada Fernando replaced Pathum Nissanka as a COVID-19 substitute for Sri Lanka.
- Dinesh Chandimal (SL) scored his first double century in Tests.
- World Test Championship points: Sri Lanka 12, Australia 0.

== In popular culture ==
The second season of the Australian docu-series - The Test was produced, following the Australian national cricket team in the aftermath of the resignation of Tim Paine as Test captain. The fourth episode of Season 2 featured Australia playing the two tests against Sri Lanka.
