= Nishan Peiris =

Sri Lankan cricketer

Personal information
- Full name: Kurukulasooriya Nishan Peiris
- Born: 11 August 1997 (age 29); Negombo, Sri Lanka
- Batting: Right-handed
- Bowling: Right-arm off-break
- Role: Bowler

International information
- National side: Sri Lanka (2024–present)
- Test debut (cap 167): 26 September 2024 v New Zealand
- Last Test: 6 February 2025 v Australia

Domestic team information
- Years: Team
- 2016–2017: Badureliya Sports Club
- 2017–2018: Colombo Cricket Club
- 2018–2019: Ragama Cricket Club
- 2021–2026: Negombo Cricket Club
- 2019–2021: Galle Cricket Club
- 2026-Present: Euxton Cricket Club

Career statistics
Competition	Test	FC	LA	T20
Matches	3	52	61	39
Runs scored	9	389	369	88
Batting average	3.00	8.64	12.30	6.76
100s/50s	0/0	0/0	0/0	0/0
Top score	5	46	34*	17
Balls bowled	789	9,742	2,821	664
Wickets	12	202	86	43
Bowling average	43.33	27.55	22.52	16.65
5 wickets in innings	1	14	2	0
10 wickets in match	0	1	0	0
Best bowling	6/170	8/94	5/16	4/3
Catches/stumpings	0/–	20/–	14/–	14/–
- Source: Cricinfo, 29 March 2025

Kurukulasooriya Nishan Peiris (born 11 August 1997) is a professional Sri Lankan cricketer who currently plays Test cricket for the national team. He is a right-arm off-break bowler and plays for the Colombo Cricket Club in domestic cricket.

== Domestic career ==
He made his first-class debut for Badureliya Sports Club in the 2015–16 Premier League Tournament on 19 February 2016. He made his Twenty20 debut for Ragama Cricket Club in the 2017–18 SLC Twenty20 Tournament on 24 February 2018. He made his List A debut for Ragama Cricket Club in the 2017–18 Premier Limited Overs Tournament on 11 March 2018.

In March 2018, he was named in Galle's squad for the 2017–18 Super Four Provincial Tournament. The following month, he was also named in Galle's squad for the 2018 Super Provincial One Day Tournament. In August 2018, he was named in Galle's squad the 2018 SLC T20 League. He was the leading wicket-taker in the 2018–19 Premier Limited Overs Tournament, with 20 dismissals in six matches.

In March 2019, he was named in Galle's squad for the 2019 Super Provincial One Day Tournament. Peiris continued to make strides at domestic circuit and he had a stellar 2024 National Super League 4-Day Tournament, where he capped off the tournament on a high note by emerging as the leading wicket-taker of the tournament with 35 scalps averaging 14.68 in across 6 matches representing Galle.

== International career ==
In August 2018, Sri Lanka Cricket named him in a preliminary squad of 31 players for the 2018 Asia Cup. In November 2018, he was added to Sri Lanka's squad as a replacement for Akila Dananjaya ahead of the third Test against England. In December 2018, he was named in Sri Lanka team for the 2018 ACC Emerging Teams Asia Cup. In March 2024, he was named in Sri Lankan test squad for their test series against Bangladesh as the selection think-tank decided to add an extra spinner for the series and as a result, Peiris made the cut replacing seamer Milan Rathnayake.

In September 2024, Peiris was drafted as a replacement for Vishwa Fernando, as the latter had confronted a leg injury prior to the start of the second test match against New Zealand. Peiris made test debut against New Zealand in the second test, replacing Ramesh Mendis. In the first innings, he got 3 wickets and helped Prabath Jayasuriya to dismantle New Zealand for 88 runs. In the second innings, he took his maiden five wicket haul and ended with 6 for 170 runs, where Sri Lanka won the match by an innings and 154 runs and series 2–0. He became only the fourth Sri Lankan to take a six-wicket haul in an innings on test debut and with a match bag of nine wickets, he was only behind Prabath Jayasuriya and Praveen Jayawickrama for having taken most number of wickets by a Sri Lankan bowler on test debut.

In January 2025, he was named in Sri Lanka's test squad for their two-match test series against Australia. During Australia' first innings, under scorching sun, he alongside his spin compatriots Prabath Jayasuriya and Jeffrey Vandersay bowled a marathon spell of overs combining a record total of 139 overs and out of which Peiris bowled a total of 41 overs. He conceded 189 runs during the marathon spell of 41 overs with a slightly expensive economy rate of 4.61 and during the process he also set the record for having registered the worst bowling figures by a Sri Lankan bowler in an innings of a test match as he ended up wicketless throughout his quota of overs despite having leaked 189 runs.
