= Wanuja Sahan =

Sri Lankan cricketer

Personal information
- Born: 17 June 2003 (age 23); Colombo
- Batting: Left-handed
- Bowling: Slow left-arm orthodox
- Role: bowler

Domestic team information
- Years: Team
- 2022: Nondescripts Cricket Club
- 2022–present: Ace Capital Cricket Club
- 2023: Dambulla Aura
- 2024: Jaffna Kings
- 2026: Colombo Kaps

Career statistics
Competition	List A	Twenty20	FC
Matches	51	37	51
Runs scored	711	210	1649
Batting average	22.21	10.00	24.25
100s/50s	0/3	0/0	2/8
Top score	62	36	153
Balls bowled	2522	745	10200
Wickets	78	38	242
Bowling average	21.41	21.81	23.37
5 wickets in innings	0	0	17
10 wickets in match	0	0	4
Best bowling	6/33	4/9	7/59
Catches/stumpings	28/–	14/–	36/–
Medal record
Men's cricket
Representing Sri Lanka
Asian Games
Bronze medal – third place	2026 Aichi–Nagoya	Team
- Source: Cricinfo, 3 October 2026

Wanuja Sahan Kumara (born 17 June 2003) is a Sri Lankan cricketer who has played for Sri Lanka national under-19 cricket team at youth level and also plays for Sri Lanka national cricket team at international level. He made his international debut in October 2026 while representing Sri Lanka at the 2026 Asian Games in Aichi-Nagoya, Japan.

== Biography ==
Wanuja began playing the sport of cricket at the age of eight. During his childhood, he played softball cricket with his two brothers. He learnt the basics of cricket while pursuing his primary education at the Sri Chandrasekara Maha Vidyalaya under the guidance of Ajith Pethangoda. During his formative years, he developed his bowling action as a chinaman bowler. His school coach Asanka Indrajith convinced Wanuja to remodel his bowling action and based on the advice from his coach, Wanuja switched to bowling left-arm spin.

Wanuja moved to St. Peter's College, Colombo in 2016 to further his cricketing ambitions. In August 2022, he captained St. Peter's College in their annual school cricket encounter against St. Joseph's College, Colombo. Under his captaincy, his school regained the Rev. Fr. Peter Pillai Memorial Trophy by defeating the St. Joseph's College during the 48th annual Limited Overs Cricket Encounter. He scored a century during the 48th annual Limited Overs Cricket Encounter ending up on a winning course for his alma mater.

== Career ==
Wanuja initially joined Nondescripts Cricket Club in 2021 and he made his T20 debut for Nondescripts Cricket Club against Nugegoda Sports Welfare Club on 23 May 2022 during the Major Clubs T20 Tournament. He was set to make his first-class debut for NCC. However, his former coach Malinda Warnapura (former Sri Lankan test captain) encouraged him to join the Ace Capital Cricket Club and Wanuja obliged his coach's suggestion. He made his first-class debut on 23 September 2022 for his new club Ace Capital Cricket Club against Sri Lanka Army Sports Club during the 2022 Major League Tournament. He endured a productive debut first-class season, taking a tally of 31 wickets at an average of 13.80.

In January 2022, he was named in Sri Lanka's squad for the 2022 ICC Under-19 Cricket World Cup which was held in the West Indies. Dunith Wellalage's emergence as a front line spinner eventually sidelined Wanuja from majority of the matches during the 2022 ICC Under-19 Cricket World Cup. As a result, he appeared in only 2 matches during the Under-19 World Cup campaign in 2022, where he only managed to pick up two scalps and score only seven runs.

He made his List A debut for Kandy against Galle on 1 April 2023 during the 2022/23 National Super League Limited Over Tournament. In December 2025, he scored his maiden century in first-class cricket for Ace Capital Cricket Club, while batting at number 7 position against Nondescripts Cricket Club at the Major League Tournament. In the same match against Nondescripts Cricket Club, he also picked up 9 wickets for the match.

In September 2026, Wanuja was included in the Sri Lankan national squad in the cricket tournament for the 2026 Asian Games and he subsequently made his debut appearance at the Asian Games representing Sri Lanka. He made his T20I debut as well as international debut on 1 October 2026, during the semi-final match of the men's cricket competition at the 2026 Asian Games against India. In the semi-final of the Asian Games men's cricket tournament, Sri Lanka was bowled out for their lowest ever total in T20I cricket after managing to score only 45 runs during the run chase of 170. Sri Lanka was knocked out of the Asian Games men's cricket tournament after succumbing to one of their heaviest defeats in T20I cricket losing by a margin of 124 runs. He was part of the Sri Lankan squad which competed at the bronze medal match against Bangladesh during the 2026 Asian Games. On 3 October 2026, Sri Lanka eventually clinched the bronze medal by beating Bangladesh by 63 runs and Wanuja also claimed his first Asian Games medal.
