= Murvin Abinash =

Sri Lankan cricketer

Personal information
- Born: 18 June 2000 (age 26); Jaffna, Sri Lanka
- Batting: Left-handed
- Bowling: Right arm offbreak
- Role: bowler

Domestic team information
- Years: Team
- 2023-2024: Burgher Recreation Club
- 2024: Jaffna Kings
- Source: Cricinfo, 1 December 2024

Murvin Abinash (born 18 June 2000) is a Sri Lankan cricketer.

== Career ==
He made his first-class debut playing for Burgher Recreation Club against Colombo Cricket Club on 25 August 2023 during the Major League Tournament.

He made his List A debut playing for Burgher Recreation Club against Bloomfield Cricket and Athletic Club on 13 December 2023 during the Major Clubs Limited Over Tournament.

In February 2024, he was named in Dambulla squad for the 2024 National Super League Limited Over Tournament. In May 2024, he was bought by Jaffna Kings in the LPL auction ahead of the 2024 Lanka Premier League.

He made his T20 debut playing for Burgher Recreation Club against Tamil Union Cricket and Athletic Club on 24 June 2024 during the 2024 Major Clubs T20 Tournament. He was named in Dambulla squad for the 2024 National Super League 4-Day Tournament.
