= Lakshitha Manasinghe =

Sri Lankan cricketer (born 1999)

Personal information
- Full name: Manasinghe Arachchige Lakshitha Rasanjana Manasinghe
- Born: 21 November 1999 (age 26); Colombo, Sri Lanka
- Batting: Left-handed
- Bowling: Right-arm off-break
- Role: All-rounder
- Source: Cricinfo, 5 July 2022

Lakshitha Manasinghe (born 21 November 1999) is a Sri Lankan cricketer. He made his List A debut on 14 December 2019, for Negombo Cricket Club in the 2019–20 Invitation Limited Over Tournament. He made his Twenty20 debut on 4 January 2020, for Negombo Cricket Club in the 2019–20 SLC Twenty20 Tournament. In March 2021, he was part of the Sinhalese Sports Club team that won the 2020–21 SLC Twenty20 Tournament, the first time they had won the tournament since 2005.

In June 2022, he was named in the Sri Lanka A squad for their matches against Australia A during Australia's tour of Sri Lanka. The following month, he was added to Sri Lanka's Test squad for the second match against Australia, and for the second Test against Pakistan. Also in July 2022, he was signed by the Colombo Stars for the third edition of the Lanka Premier League.

Lakshitha who was educated at Nalanda College, Colombo captained the college first XI cricket team in 2019.
