= Nipun Dhananjaya =

Sri Lankan cricketer

Personal information
- Full name: Kenaththage Nipun Dhananjaya Perera
- Born: 28 September 2000 (age 26); Chilaw, Sri Lanka
- Batting: Left-handed
- Bowling: Right-arm off-break
- Role: Batsman

Domestic team information
- Years: Team
- 2018–present: SSC
- 2021–2022: Jaffna Kings
- 2023–2024: Colombo Strikers
- 2023–present: Colombo

Career statistics
Competition	FC	LA	T20
Matches	43	47	24
Runs scored	2612	1514	446
Batting average	43.53	40.91	22.30
100s/50s	6/14	3/10	0/1
Top score	201	127*	80*
Balls bowled	775	399	36
Wickets	9	16	2
Bowling average	47.88	17.31	14.00
5 wickets in innings	0	0	0
10 wickets in match	0	0	0
Best bowling	2/13	4/29	2/9
Catches/stumpings	43/–	18/–	8/–
- Source: ESPNcricinfo, 2 February 2023

Nipun Dhananjaya (born 28 September 2000) is a Sri Lankan cricketer. He made his first-class debut for Sinhalese Sports Club in the 2018–19 Premier League Tournament on 14 December 2018. Prior to his first-class debut, he was named in Sri Lanka's squad for the 2018 Under-19 Cricket World Cup. He made his Twenty20 debut for Sinhalese Sports Club in the 2018–19 SLC Twenty20 Tournament on 19 February 2019. In January 2020, he was named as the captain of Sri Lanka's squad for the 2020 Under-19 Cricket World Cup.

In March 2021, he was part of the Sinhalese Sports Club team that won the 2020–21 SLC Twenty20 Tournament, the first time they had won the tournament since 2005. He made his List A debut on 24 March 2021, for Sinhalese Sports Club in the 2020–21 Major Clubs Limited Over Tournament. In August 2021, he was named in the SLC Reds team for the 2021 SLC Invitational T20 League tournament.

In April 2022, Sri Lanka Cricket (SLC) named him as the four-day captain of the Sri Lanka Emerging Team for their tour to England. In June 2022, he was named in the Sri Lanka A squad for their matches against Australia A during Australia's tour of Sri Lanka. In July 2022, he was signed by the Jaffna Kings for the third edition of the Lanka Premier League.
