= Raveen Yasas =

Sri Lankan cricketer (born 1999)

Personal information
- Full name: Urala Raveen Yasas
- Born: 10 January 1999 (age 27); Mahamodara, Sri Lanka

Domestic team information
- Years: Team
- 2016: Chilaw Marians Cricket Club
- Source: ESPNcricinfo, 22 January 2017

Raveen Yasas (born 10 January 1999) is a Sri Lankan cricketer. He made his first-class debut for Chilaw Marians Cricket Club in the 2016–17 Premier League Tournament on 20 January 2017. He made his List A debut for Puttalam District in the 2016–17 Districts One Day Tournament on 22 March 2017. He made his Twenty20 debut on 4 March 2021, for Chilaw Marians Cricket Club in the 2020–21 SLC Twenty20 Tournament.
