= Pasindu Sooriyabandara =

Sri Lankan cricketer (born 1999)

Personal information
- Full name: Don Pasindu Sanjula Sooriyabandara
- Born: 19 October 1999 (age 27); Colombo, Sri Lanka
- Batting: Right-handed
- Role: Middle-order Batsman

International information
- National side: Sri Lanka (2026–present)
- Test debut (cap 173): 18 August 2026 v India
- Last Test: 19 August 2026 v India

Domestic team information
- Years: Team
- 2018–2020: SSC
- 2021–Present: Moors
- 2023–Present: Galle
- 2024–Present: Galle Marvels

Career statistics
Competition	FC	LA	T20
Matches	52	61	22
Runs scored	3,870	1,555	335
Batting average	56.08	31.73	30.45
100s/50s	11/19	0/12	0/1
Top score	242	98	58
Balls bowled	201	192	–
Wickets	4	5	–
Bowling average	35.25	27.40	–
5 wickets in innings	0	0	–
10 wickets in match	0	0	–
Best bowling	2/29	2/27	–
Catches/stumpings	53/0	20/0	10/0
- Source: ESPNcricinfo, 13 August 2024

Pasindu Sooriyabandara (Sinhala: පසිඳු සූරියබණ්ඩාර, [pasiⁿd̪u su:rijəbaɳɖa:rə] (Note: [ⁿd̪] is a Prenasalized consonant.), born 19 October 1999) is a Sri Lankan cricketer. He made his first-class debut for Sinhalese Sports Club in the 2018–19 Premier League Tournament on 7 December 2016. He made his Twenty20 debut on 4 January 2020, for Sinhalese Sports Club in the 2019–20 SLC Twenty20 Tournament. He made his List A debut on 28 March 2021, for Moors Sports Club in the 2020–21 Major Clubs Limited Over Tournament.

In August 2026, Sooriyabandara was selected in Sri Lanka's test squad against India. He debuted as a concussion substitute in the 2nd innings in Galle. He justified his selection by scoring win fifties in the 2nd test in the series against India, held at Sinhalese Sports Club Grounds.
