= Nimsara Atharagalla =

Sri Lankan cricketer (born 1999)

Nimasara Atharagalla
Personal information
- Born: 7 May 1999 (age 27); Kandy, Sri Lanka
- Source: Cricinfo, 16 February 2019

Nimasara Atharagalla (born 7 May 1999) is a Sri Lankan cricketer. He made his Twenty20 debut for Chilaw Marians Cricket Club in the 2018–19 SLC Twenty20 Tournament on 16 February 2019. He made his List A debut on 24 March 2021, for Kurunegala Youth Cricket Club in the 2020–21 Major Clubs Limited Over Tournament.
