= Vishad Randika =

Sri Lankan cricketer (born 1997)

Personal information
- Full name: Ponnadura Vishad Randika De Silva
- Born: 2 September 1997 (age 29); Panadura, Sri Lanka
- Source: Cricinfo, 7 January 2017

Vishad Randika (born 2 September 1997) is a Sri Lankan cricketer. He made his first-class debut for Colts Cricket Club in the 2016–17 Premier League Tournament on 6 January 2017. Prior to his debut, he was named in Sri Lanka's squad for the 2016 Under-19 Cricket World Cup. He made his List A debut for Kegalle District in the 2016–17 Districts One Day Tournament on 23 March 2017. He made his Twenty20 debut for Colts Cricket Club in the 2018–19 SLC Twenty20 Tournament on 15 February 2019.
