= Ravindu Rasantha =

Sri Lankan cricketer (born 2001)

Personal information
- Born: 8 April 2001 (age 25)
- Source: Cricinfo, 17 June 2021

Ravindu Rasantha (born 8 April 2001) is a Sri Lankan cricketer. In January 2020, Rasantha was named in Sri Lanka's squad for the 2020 Under-19 Cricket World Cup. On 27 January 2020, in Sri Lanka's plate quarter-final against Nigeria, Rasantha scored 102 not out. Following the conclusion of the tournament, Rasantha was named in the U19 World Cup Team of the Tournament, the only Sri Lankan cricketer to be named in the team.

Rasantha made his List A debut on 24 March 2021, for Tamil Union Cricket and Athletic Club in the 2020–21 Major Clubs Limited Over Tournament. He made his Twenty20 debut on 23 May 2022, for Colts Cricket Club in the Major Clubs T20 Tournament.

== See also ==
- List of Under-19 Cricket World Cup centuries
