= Chamindu Wickramasinghe =

Sri Lankan cricketer (born 2002)

Personal information
- Born: 6 September 2002 (age 24); Kandy, Sri Lanka
- Batting: Left-handed
- Bowling: Right-arm fast-medium
- Role: Batting all-rounder

International information
- National side: Sri Lanka (2024–present)
- ODI debut (cap 215): 19 November 2024 v New Zealand
- Last ODI: 5 January 2025 v New Zealand
- T20I debut (cap 108): 30 July 2024 v India
- Last T20I: 13 October 2024 v West Indies

Domestic team information
- Years: Team
- 2021–present: Singhalese Sports Club
- 2024: Dambulla Sixers

Career statistics
Competition	T20I	FC	LA	T20
Matches	2	8	17	25
Runs scored	8	268	378	282
Batting average	–	29.77	31.5	25.63
100s/50s	0/0	1/0	0/1	0/2
Top score	4*	106	83*	62*
Balls bowled	36	336	144	226
Wickets	1	5	5	12
Bowling average	44.00	48.8	32.0	31.5
5 wickets in innings	0	0	0	0
10 wickets in match	0	0	0	0
Best bowling	1/17	2/34	2/31	2/1
Catches/stumpings	1/–	9/–	10/–	7/–
- Source: Cricinfo, 17 October 2024

Chamindu Wickramasinghe (Sinhala: චමිඳු වික්‍රමසිංහ, [tʃamiⁿd̪u ʋikrəməsiŋɦə] (Note: [ⁿd̪] is a Prenasalized consonant.); born 6 September 2002) is a professional Sri Lankan cricketer who plays Twenty20 Internationals for the national team and all formats for Sinhalese Sports Club and Dambulla Sixers in domestic cricket. He plays as an all-rounder.

== Early life ==
Wickramasinghe became a cricketer due to the influence of his grandfather, a former football player. He began his career as a school cricketer, representing St. Anthony's College, Kandy. Some of the milestones of his career as a school cricketer include a century on his First XI debut and scoring the fastest century in the inter-school limited-overs tournament. Later, he played under-19 cricket for Sri Lanka.

== Domestic career ==
He made his Twenty20 debut on 4 March 2021, for Sinhalese Sports Club in the 2020–21 SLC Twenty20 Tournament. He made his List A debut for Team Colombo against Team Galle, on 5 July 2022 in the 2022–23 Major Clubs Limited Over Tournament. He made his first-class debut for Sinhalese Sports Club against Nugegoda Sports and Welfare Club, on 25 August 2023 in the Major League Tournament.

== Franchise Cricket ==
In LPL 2024, Chamindu played his first franchise tournament with Dambulla Sixers. He scored 181 runs in 6 inning with a couple of half centuries and picked up 7 wickets in 8 innings.

== International career ==
In July 2024, he earned maiden call-up for Sri Lanka national team for the T20I series against India.

== Honours ==
=== Individual ===
- LPL Emerging Player of the Season: 2024
