= Shantha Fonseka =

Sri Lankan cricketer and umpire (born 1975)

Personal information
- Born: 28 September 1975 (age 51)
- Role: Umpire

Umpiring information
- WODIs umpired: 1 (2023)
- Source: Cricinfo, 6 March 2019

Shantha Fonseka (born 28 September 1975) is a Sri Lankan former cricketer who played in three first-class and six List A matches between 1996 and 2001. He is now an umpire, and has stood in matches in the 2018–19 Premier Limited Overs Tournament.
