= Sithum Disanayaka =

Sri Lankan cricketer (born 2000)

Personal information
- Born: 8 March 2000 (age 26)
- Source: Cricinfo, 14 December 2019

Sithum Disanayaka (born 8 March 2000) is a Sri Lankan cricketer. He made his List A debut on 14 December 2019, for Panadura Sports Club in the 2019–20 Invitation Limited Over Tournament.
