= Shashika Dulshan =

Sri Lankan cricketer (born 2000)

Personal information
- Born: 4 May 2000 (age 26)
- Batting: Left-handed
- Bowling: Left-arm orthodox
- Source: Cricinfo, 13 July 2020

Shashika Dulshan (born 4 May 2000) is a Sri Lankan cricketer. He made his first-class debut for Lankan Cricket Club in Tier B of the 2018–19 Premier League Tournament on 15 May 2019. He made his Twenty20 debut on 12 March 2021, for Ragama Cricket Club in the 2020–21 SLC Twenty20 Tournament. He made his List A debut on 26 March 2021, for Ragama Cricket Club in the 2020–21 Major Clubs Limited Over Tournament. In November 2021, he was selected to play for the Kandy Warriors following the players' draft for the 2021 Lanka Premier League.
