= Kamindu Mendis =

Sri Lankan cricketer (born 1998)

Personal information
- Full name: Pasqual Handi Kamindu Dilanka Mendis
- Born: 30 September 1998 (age 28); Galle, Sri Lanka
- Batting: Left-handed
- Bowling: Slow left-arm orthodox; Right-arm off break
- Role: All-rounder

International information
- National side: Sri Lanka (2018–present)
- Test debut (cap 160): 8 July 2022 v Australia
- Last Test: 23 August 2026 v India
- ODI debut (cap 190): 10 March 2019 v South Africa
- Last ODI: 6 June 2026 v West Indies
- T20I debut (cap 77): 27 October 2018 v England
- Last T20I: 14 June 2026 v West Indies

Domestic team information
- Years: Team
- 2015/16: Galle Cricket Club
- 2018/19: Tamil Union Cricket and Athletic Club
- 2019/20–2021/22: Chilaw Marians Cricket Club
- 2020–2024: Kandy Falcons
- 2022–2023/24: Colombo Cricket Club
- 2025–present: Sunrisers Hyderabad
- 2025/26: MI Emirates
- 2026: Colombo Kaps
- 2026/27–present: Nangarhar Cosmic

Career statistics
Competition	Test	ODI	T20I	FC
Matches	18	29	46	65
Runs scored	1,556	539	766	5,476
Batting average	53.65	25.66	20.70	58.25
100s/50s	5/7	0/3	0/4	19/27
Top score	182*	64	65*	200*
Balls bowled	180	300	174	1,685
Wickets	3	6	5	31
Bowling average	52.66	54.33	47.60	37.64
5 wickets in innings	0	0	0	0
10 wickets in match	0	0	0	0
Best bowling	3/32	3/19	1/14	4/43
Catches/stumpings	16/–	11/–	16/–	65/–
Medal record
Men's Cricket
Representing Sri Lanka
South Asian Games
Silver medal – second place	2019 Kathmandu/Pokhara	Team
- Source: Cricinfo, 27 August 2026

Pasqual Handi Kamindu Dilanka Mendis (Sinhala: පැස්කුවල් හන්දි කමිඳු දිලංක මෙන්ඩිස්, [ˈkamiⁿd̪u Menɖis] (Note: [ⁿd̪] is a Prenasalized consonant.); born 30 September 1998), popularly known as Kamindu Mendis, is a professional Sri Lankan cricketer who plays for the national team in all three formats and for Colombo Cricket Club in domestic cricket. He is an ambidextrous bowler who can bowl both right and left-arm deliveries. He made his international debut for the Sri Lanka cricket team in October 2018.

== Early and domestic career ==
Mendis started bowling with both arms at the age of 13 while playing cricket for Richmond College, Galle. He made his List A debut alongside Charith Asalanka on 30 November 2015 in the AIA Premier Limited Over Tournament.

The following month, he was named in Sri Lanka's squad for the 2016 Under-19 Cricket World Cup. He was named as the Under-19 captain in December 2016 and captained the Sri Lankan squad for the 2018 Under-19 Cricket World Cup.

He was named in Colombo's squad for the 2017–18 Super Four Provincial Tournament and the 2018 Super Provincial One Day Tournament, before being named in the squad the 2018 SLC T20 League. He made his Twenty20 debut for Colombo on 21 August 2018.

He made his first-class debut for Tamil Union Cricket and Athletic Club in the 2018–19 Premier League Tournament on 30 November 2018. In March 2019, he was named in Colombo's squad for the 2019 Super Provincial One Day Tournament. In December 2019, he was the leading wicket-taker in the 2019–20 Invitation Limited Over Tournament, with nineteen dismissals in eight matches.

=== Lanka Premier League (LPL) ===
In October 2020, he was drafted by the Kandy Tuskers for the inaugural edition of the Lanka Premier League. In August 2021, he was named as the vice-captain of the SLC Greens team for the 2021 SLC Invitational T20 League tournament. In November 2021, he was selected to play for the Kandy Warriors following the players' draft for the 2021 Lanka Premier League. In July 2022, he was signed by the Kandy Falcons for the third edition of the Lanka Premier League.

In May 2026, he was signed by the Colombo Kaps as the "Local Star Player" for the 2026 Lanka Premier League. During the tournament, he captained the Kaps due to Kusal Mendis' absence and finished as the highest run-getter for the Colombo Kaps with 280 runs.

=== Indian Premier League (IPL) ===
Mendis was acquired by Sunrisers Hyderabad (SRH) for ₹75 lakh in the 2025 IPL mega auctions. In his debut match against Kolkata Knight Riders, he became the first player in IPL history to switch his bowling arm in a single over, dismissing Angkrish Raghuvanshi with his left-arm orthodox spin before switching to right-arm off-spin. Additionally, he was awarded the "Catch of the Season" for an unbelievable, full-stretch diving catch at the boundary to dismiss Dewald Brevis against Chennai Super Kings.

He was retained by the SRH for the 2026 Indian Premier League at his 2025 purchase price of ₹75 lakh.

=== International League T20 (ILT20) ===
Kamindu joined MI Emirates for the International League T20 2025/26 season as a pre-signed player.

== International career ==
In August 2018, Sri Lanka Cricket named him in a preliminary squad of 31 players for the 2018 Asia Cup.

In October 2018, he was named in Sri Lanka's Twenty20 International (T20I) squad for the one-off match against England. He made his T20I debut for Sri Lanka against England on 27 October 2018. He scored 24 runs in the match.

In December 2018, he was named in Sri Lanka team for the 2018 ACC Emerging Teams Asia Cup. In February 2019, he was named in Sri Lanka's One Day International (ODI) squad for their series against South Africa. He made his ODI debut for Sri Lanka against South Africa on 10 March 2019. In November 2019, he was named as the vice-captain of Sri Lanka's squad for the 2019 ACC Emerging Teams Asia Cup in Bangladesh. Later the same month, he was named as the vice-captain of Sri Lanka's squad for the men's cricket tournament at the 2019 South Asian Games. The Sri Lanka team won the silver medal, after they lost to Bangladesh by seven wickets in the final.

In September 2021, Mendis was named in Sri Lanka's squad for the 2021 ICC Men's T20 World Cup. In January 2022, he was named in Sri Lanka's ODI squad for their series against Zimbabwe.

In May 2024, he was named in Sri Lanka's squad for the 2024 ICC Men's T20 World Cup tournament.

=== Test match cricket ===
In May 2022, he was named in Sri Lanka's Test squad for their series against Bangladesh. The following month, he was named in the Sri Lanka A squad for their matches against Australia A during Australia's tour of Sri Lanka. Later the same month, he was named in Sri Lanka's Test squad, also for their home series against Australia. He made his Test debut on 8 July 2022, for Sri Lanka against Australia. In the match, he scored his maiden Test fifty and made a match-winning partnership of 133-runs with centurion Dinesh Chandimal. Sri Lanka won the match by an innings and 39 runs, their first innings victory in Test cricket against Australia. In 2024 in the 3rd T20I against Afghanistan, Mendis scored an unbeaten fighting knock of 65 runs in a losing cause.

Against Bangladesh in March 2024, Mendis scored 102 in the first innings and made a 202-run sixth-wicket stand with the skipper Dhananjaya de Silva, who also scored a century. Both of them were dismissed for 102, where Sri Lanka posted 280 runs in the first innings. In the second innings, Mendis scored another century and made another century stand with de Silva, who also made a century. This was only the third instance, where two players from the same team made twin hundreds in a Test match. Mendis scored 164 which included 16 fours and 6 sixes, where Sri Lanka posted. Finally, Sri Lanka won the match by 328 runs. With twin hundreds, Mendis also became the first batter with two hundreds in a Test while batting at No. 7 or lower. His total of 266 runs is the second-most by any batter while batting at No. 7 or lower in a Test match only behind Don Bradman's 270 runs against England in the 1937 Melbourne Test.

In the second test, he made an unbeaten 92 runs in the first innings, where he was able to equal the world record for the most runs in the first four innings of the career with 419 along with Pakistani Javed Miandad. Sri Lanka piled 531 runs on the board, which is the highest total in a Test innings without a single century. Eventually, Sri Lanka won the match by 192-runs and completed series 2–0, where Mendis adjudged the player of the series for impressive 367 runs and 3 wickets.

In the England series, Mendis scored his third century and made a 117-run stand with Dinesh Chandimal. Despite his knock, Sri Lanka lost the match by 5 wickets. His batting average of 92.16 after the Test, is recorded as the second-highest in Test history among players with more than 500 runs. In the second Test match, Mendis scored 74 runs and briefly lifted his Test average back above 100 - with his sixth fifty-plus score in only eight Test innings. However, Sri Lanka lost the match by 190 runs and also the series. In the third Test, he again scored a fifty and helped to score a total of 263 for Sri Lanka. With an impressive fast bowling display from Sri Lankan pacers and a century by Pathum Nissanka, Sri Lanka won the match by 8 wickets and ended the series on a high note. Mendis was again adjudged as the player of the series along with England batter Joe Root for scoring 267 runs with 53.40 average and strike rate of 63.

In the first test against New Zealand in Galle, Mendis scored his fourth century and made a 72-run partnership with Angelo Mathews and then 103 runs with Kusal Mendis. Sri Lanka made 305 runs in the first innings. In the second test, he notched up an unbeaten 182 and became the fastest Asian and 3rd fastest overall joint with Sir Don Bradman to reach 1000 test runs in just 13 innings only behind Herbert Sutcliffe and Everton Weekes. Nine times in his 13 innings he crossed 50, five times crossed 100, and twice went past 150. On the course, he became the fastest batter of the 21st century to 1000 runs as well. Mendis also became the first player with a fifty-plus score in each of his first eight Test matches as well as his average of 91.27 is the second-highest among players with 1000-plus runs, behind only Bradman's 99.94. Sri Lanka eventually won the match by an innings and 154 runs and Mendis was adjudged as the man of the match.

== International centuries ==
=== Key ===
- † – Player of the match

=== Test centuries ===
Test centuries scored by Kamindu Mendis
No.	Runs	Opponent	Pos.	Inn.	Venue	H/A/N	Date	Result	Ref
1	102	Bangladesh	7	1	Sylhet International Cricket Stadium, Sylhet	Away	22 March 2024	Won	
2	164	Bangladesh	8	3	Sylhet International Cricket Stadium, Sylhet	Away	22 March 2024	Won	
3	113	England	7	3	Old Trafford Cricket Ground, Manchester	Away	21 August 2024	Lost	
4	114	New Zealand	5	1	Galle International Stadium, Galle	Home	18 September 2024	Won	
5	182* †	New Zealand	5	1	Galle International Stadium, Galle	Home	26 September 2024	Won	

=== ODI centuries ===
One Day International centuries scored by Kamindu Mendis
No.	Score	Against	Pos.	Inn.	SR	Venue	H/A/N	Date	Result	Ref
1	131	Pakistan	2	1	102.34	Gaddafi Stadium, Lahore	Away	31 October 2026	Lost	

== Achievements ==
- First batter with two hundreds in a Test while batting at No. 7 or lower.
- First batter to score fifty or more in eight consecutive Test matches since making his debut.
- Third joint fastest batter to score 1,000 Test runs by innings (13).
- The first player to switch his bowling arm during an over in Indian Premier League.

== Awards ==
- ICC Men's Player of the Month: March 2024, September 2024
- ICC Men's Emerging Cricketer of the Year: 2024
- ICC Men's Test Team of the Year: 2024
- Sri Lanka Cricket Cricketer of the Year: 2024
