= Jeffrey Vandersay =

Sri Lankan cricketer

Personal information
- Full name: Jeffrey Dexter Francis Vandersay
- Born: 5 February 1990 (age 36); Wattala, Sri Lanka
- Height: 5 ft 7 in (1.70 m)
- Batting: Right-handed
- Bowling: Right arm leg-break
- Role: Bowler

International information
- National side: Sri Lanka (2015–present)
- Test debut (cap 158): 29 June 2022 v Australia
- Last Test: 29 January 2025 v Australia
- ODI debut (cap 168): 28 December 2015 v New Zealand
- Last ODI: 19 November 2024 v New Zealand
- T20I debut (cap 56): 30 July 2015 v Pakistan
- Last T20I: 27 February 2022 v India

Domestic team information
- Years: Team
- 2012–?: Moors SC
- 2010–?: Seeduwa Raddoluwa CC
- SSC

Career statistics
Competition	Test	ODI	T20I	FC
Matches	2	28	14	79
Runs scored	71	112	20	1,170
Batting average	17.8	11.20	20.00	15.39
100s/50s	0/1	0/0	0/0	0/4
Top score	53	25	8*	69
Balls bowled	60	1,185	296	12,491
Wickets	5	40	7	297
Bowling average	50.0	26.62	56.42	27.79
5 wickets in innings	0	1	0	19
10 wickets in match	0	0	0	1
Best bowling	2/68	6/33	2/26	7/77
Catches/stumpings	1/–	5/–	1/–	35/–
- Source: Cricinfo, 7 April 2025

Jeffrey Dexter Francis Vandersay (born 5 February 1990) is a professional Sri Lankan cricketer who currently plays limited overs cricket for the national team. He is an alumnus of Wesley College, Colombo. He has endured a stop-start international career due to various reasons including poor form, lack of consistent selection, disciplinary issues and lack of consistency with the ball.

== Domestic career ==
In March 2018, he was named in Dambulla's squad for the 2017–18 Super Four Provincial Tournament. The following month, he was also named in Dambulla's squad for the 2018 Super Provincial One Day Tournament.

In August 2018, he was named in Galle's squad the 2018 SLC T20 League. In March 2019, he was named in Kandy's squad for the 2019 Super Provincial One Day Tournament. In October 2020, he was drafted by the Colombo Kings for the inaugural edition of the Lanka Premier League.

In March 2021, he was part of the Sinhalese Sports Club team that won the 2020–21 SLC Twenty20 Tournament, the first time they had won the tournament since 2005. In July 2022, he was signed by the Colombo Stars for the third edition of the Lanka Premier League.

== International career ==
He played in the tour match between SLCB President's XI and Pakistanis in June 2015. He made his Twenty20 International debut for Sri Lanka against Pakistan on 30 July 2015. He was unable to take a wicket and finished with figures of 25 runs from 4 overs.

Vandersay made his One Day International (ODI) debut for Sri Lanka against New Zealand on 28 December 2015 as the 168th ODI player for Sri Lanka. He scored 7 runs not out in his first ODI innings, but in bowling, he was severely hit by Martin Guptill and in the end Vandersey conceded 34 runs in 2 overs. Sri Lanka lost the match by 10 wickets. However, his first ODI wicket came during the 3rd ODI at Saxton Oval, when he dismissed Tom Latham for 42 runs. He took his first Twenty20 International wicket by dismissing Corey Anderson in the first Twenty20 International against New Zealand at Bay Oval. Vandersay was originally included in the 2016 ICC World Twenty20 Sri Lanka squad, but due to poor performances in New Zealand and Pakistan tours, he was dropped from the world cup squad. He was later re-added to the squad after Lasith Malinga was ruled out with an injury.

In January 2017, he was added to Sri Lanka's ODI squad for their series against South Africa. In November 2017, he was added to Sri Lanka's Test squad, replacing Rangana Herath, ahead of the third Test against India, but he did not play. In May 2018, he was named in Sri Lanka's Test squad for their series against the West Indies. He did not play in any matches, and ahead of the third and final Test of the series, he was sent home due to conduct issues.

In May 2018, he was one of 33 cricketers to be awarded a national contract by Sri Lanka Cricket ahead of the 2018–19 season. In December 2018, he was named in Sri Lanka team for the 2018 ACC Emerging Teams Asia Cup. On 23 June 2018, Vandersay was sent home by Sri Lanka Cricket (SLC) after a breach of his player contract regarding disciplinary issues. He was in the Caribbean at that time, but did not play any matches. During the press release, SLC reported an "incident" following which this decision. The following month, he was handed a one-year suspended sentence and a 20% fine of his annual contract.

In April 2019, he was named in Sri Lanka's squad for the 2019 Cricket World Cup. In February 2022, he was named in Sri Lanka's Test squad for their series against India. In June 2022, he was named in the Sri Lanka A squad for their matches against Australia A during Australia's tour of Sri Lanka. Later the same month, he was named in Sri Lanka's Test squad, also for their home series against Australia. He made his Test debut on 29 June 2022, for Sri Lanka against Australia. However he was dropped from the squad after testing positive for COVID-19.

In August 2024, he had a serendipitous return to Sri Lankan ODI side after a long hiatus and he was named in Sri Lankan squad in the last minute as an injury replacement ahead of the final two ODI matches against India after the main first-choice spinner Wanindu Hasaranga was ruled out of the rest of the ODI matches due to hamstring injury. On his comeback return to Sri Lankan side, he made early inroads by deploying sublime wicket-to-wicket lines to trouble the Indian batting order on a slow surface favoring spinning conditions during the second ODI of the series and he eventually claimed his maiden five-wicket haul in ODI cricket with a match-winning spell of 6 for 33 runs in his full quota of ten overs to dismantle India for 208 runs inside 43 overs and his bowling heroics also propelled Sri Lanka to win by a margin of 32 runs to claim an unassailable 1–0 lead over India with a match to spare. He claimed the important wickets of Rohit Sharma, Shubman Gill, Virat Kohli, Shivam Dube, Shreyas Iyer and KL Rahul during his way to complete a six-wicket haul in an effort to defend 240 runs and he also received a player of the match award. He ended up the three-match ODI series as the leading wicket-taker among the two teams with a tally of eight wickets and his bowling exploits eventually helped Sri Lanka to win the ODI series 2-0 while it also marked first bilateral ODI-series win in 27 years for Sri Lanka against India since 1997.

In January 2025, he was named in Sri Lanka's test squad for their two-match test series against Australia. He also made a comeback return to test cricket after an hiatus almost three years when he was included in the first test match against Australia on 29 January 2025. During Australia' first innings, under scorching sun, he alongside his spin compatriots Prabath Jayasuriya and Nishan Peiris bowled a marathon spell of overs combining a record total of 139 overs and out of which Vandersay bowled a total of 38 overs. He conceded 182 runs during the marathon spell of 38 overs with a slightly expensive economy rate of 4.79 and picked up three wickets which included priced scalps of Marnus Labuschagne, Steve Smith and Beau Webster. He scored his maiden half-century in test cricket when he smashed a quickfire swashbuckling 53 runs off 47 deliveries during Sri Lanka's follow-on reply to Australia's grand first innings scorecard of 654/6, with an impressive strike rate of 112.77 and the innings included a flurry of boundaries including seven fours and two sixes. He also eventually top-scored for Sri Lanka in the second innings especially when Sri Lanka was asked to follow-on by Australia. He also became the first Sri Lankan batter batting at number nine or lower to score a half-century in an innings of a test match against Australia.
