= Dunith Wellalage =

Sri Lankan cricketer (born 2003)

Personal information
- Full name: Dunith Nethmika Wellalage
- Born: 9 January 2003 (age 23); Colombo, Sri Lanka
- Nickname: Wella
- Batting: Left-handed
- Bowling: Left-arm orthodox
- Role: Bowling All-Rounder

International information
- National side: Sri Lanka (2022–present)
- Only Test (cap 162): 24 July 2022 v Pakistan
- ODI debut (cap 204): 14 June 2022 v Australia
- Last ODI: 22 January 2026 v England
- T20I debut (cap 109): 15 October 2024 v West Indies
- Last T20I: 20 September 2025 v Bangladesh

Domestic team information
- Years: Team
- 2018/19–2020: Lankan Cricket Club
- 2022–present: Colts Cricket Club
- 2022–2023; 2026: Jaffna Kings
- 2023/24: Fortune Barishal
- 2024: Colombo Strikers
- 2024: Barbados Royals
- 2025: Paarl Royals
- 2026: Lahore Qalandars (squad no. 9)

Career statistics
Competition	Test	ODI	T20I	FC
Matches	1	31	6	31
Runs scored	29	386	12	958
Batting average	14.50	20.31	12.00	25.89
100s/50s	0/0	0/1	0/0	0/4
Top score	18	67*	11*	78*
Balls bowled	78	1,319	141	4,780
Wickets	0	39	7	98
Bowling average	–	29.10	25.14	27.06
5 wickets in innings	0	2	0	6
10 wickets in match	0	0	–	0
Best bowling	–	5/27	3/9	8/152
Catches/stumpings	2/0	10/0	3/0	17/0
- Source: ESPNcricinfo, 28 September 2025

Dunith Nethmika Wellalage (born 9 January 2003) is a professional Sri Lankan cricketer currently plays limited overs cricket for the national side. He made his international debut for the Sri Lanka cricket team in June 2022 to a series against Australia. He was educated at St. Sebastian's College, Moratuwa and St. Joseph's College, Colombo 10.

== Domestic and franchise career ==
Wellalage made his List A debut on 14 December 2019, for Lankan Cricket Club in the 2019–20 Invitation Limited Over Tournament. In July 2022, he was signed by the Jaffna Kings for the third edition of the Lanka Premier League. He was also signed by Fortune Barishal in the tenth edition of Bangladesh Premier League.

In May 2026, he was signed by the Jaffna Kings as the "Local Star Player" for the Lanka Premier League season 6.

== International career ==
In January 2022, he was named as the captain of Sri Lanka's team for the 2022 ICC Under-19 Cricket World Cup in the West Indies. In Sri Lanka's opening fixture of the tournament, he took a five-wicket haul, and was named the player of the match. In Sri Lanka's next match of the tournament, he took another five-wicket haul, and was again named the player of the match. In Sri Lanka's Super League playoff semi-final match against South Africa, Wellalage scored 113 runs, with Sri Lanka winning the match by 65 runs. He became the first captain of the Sri Lankan team to score a century in the Under-19 Cricket World Cup. He finished the Under-19 World Cup as the leading wicket-taker, with seventeen dismissals.

In April 2022, Sri Lanka Cricket (SLC) named him in the Sri Lanka Emerging Team's squad for their tour to England. On 25 May 2022, during the tour of England, he made his Twenty20 debut, against Surrey. The following month, he was named in the Sri Lanka A squad for their matches against Australia A during Australia's tour of Sri Lanka. Later the same month, he was named in Sri Lanka's One Day International (ODI) squad, also for their series against Australia. He made his ODI debut on 14 June 2022, for Sri Lanka against Australia. The following month, he was added to Sri Lanka's Test squad for the second match against Australia.

In July 2022, he was again named in Sri Lanka's Test squad, this time for their home series against Pakistan. He made his Test debut on 24 July 2022, for Sri Lanka against Pakistan.

In March 2023, he was named in both One Day International and Twenty20 International squad for the series against New Zealand. In May 2024, he was named in Sri Lanka’s squad for the 2024 ICC Men's T20 World Cup tournament.

On August 2, 2024 first ODI match against India Dunith scored his maiden ODI half century. He scored unbeaten 67 runs from 65 balls hitting seven boundaries and two sixes. He also took two crucial wickets of Rohit Sharma and Shubman Gill while bowling. Finally the match ended as a tie. Due to his performance he won player of the match award. In the third ODI against India, Wellalage took his second five wicket haul and destroyed Indian top order. His fifer was also nominated at the ESPNcricinfo Awards 2024: Men's ODI bowling. Eventually Sri Lanka won the match by 110 runs and the series 2-0. This is the first ODI bilateral series win against India in 27 years. He won the player of the series award for 108 runs and 7 wickets in the series.

He made his T20I debut on 15 October 2024 against West Indies. In the match he took 3 for 9 runs where Sri Lanka won the match by 73 runs comfortably. The success continued during the New Zealand tour, where he took match winning 3 for 20 in the first T20I. Finally Sri Lanka won the match by 4 wickets. However, he was dropped from the team for the New Zealand tour in late 2024.

On 18 September 2025 during the 2025 Asia Cup, his father Suranga Wellalage died of a heart attack at the age of 54. Suranga was also a former cricketer and a coach. Dunith returned Sri Lanka for the funeral works with team manager Mahinda Halangoda and travelled back to UAE next day for the remainder of Asia cup.
