= Ahan Wickramasinghe =

Sri Lankan cricketer (born 2001)

Personal information
- Full name: Wickramasinghe Arachchige Ahan Sachintha
- Born: 2 September 2001 (age 25); Colombo, Sri Lanka

Domestic team information
- Years: Team
- 2021/22: Nondescripts Cricket Club
- Source: Cricinfo, 3 November 2021

Ahan Wickramasinghe (born 2 September 2001) is a Sri Lankan cricketer. He made his List A debut on 3 November 2021, for Nondescripts Cricket Club in the 2021–22 Major Clubs Limited Over Tournament. Prior to his List A debut, he was named in Sri Lanka's squad for the 2020 Under-19 Cricket World Cup. He made his Twenty20 debut on 23 May 2022, for Nondescripts Cricket Club in the Major Clubs T20 Tournament.
