= Prabath Jayasuriya =

Sri Lankan cricketer (born 1991)

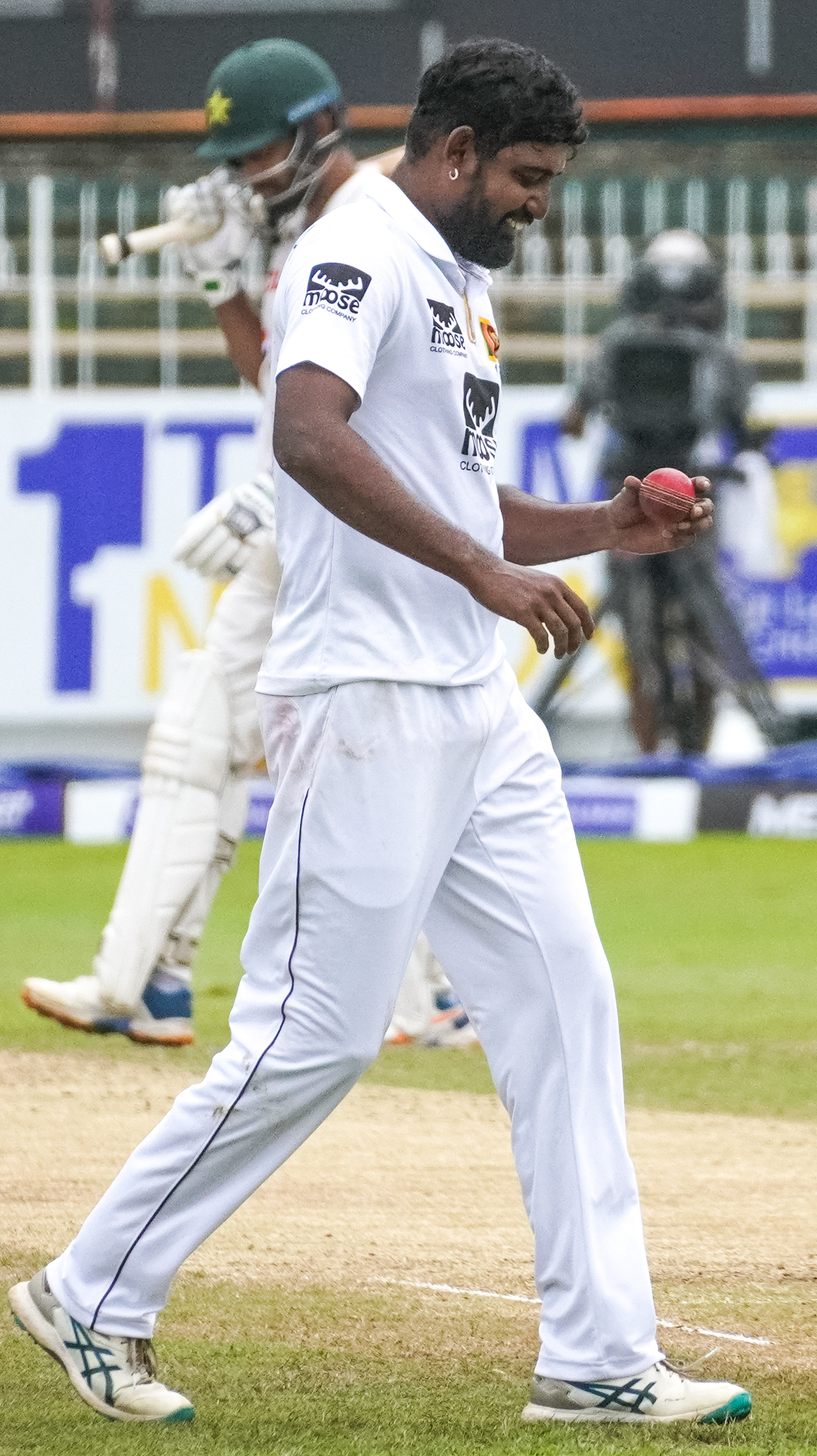
- Jayasuriya in 2023

Personal information
- Full name: Neketh Gedara Roshan Prabath Jayasuriya
- Born: 5 November 1991 (age 35); Matale, Sri Lanka
- Batting: Right-handed
- Bowling: Left-arm orthodox
- Role: Bowler

International information
- National side: Sri Lanka (2018–present)
- Test debut (cap 159): 8 July 2022 v Australia
- Last Test: 25 June 2025 v Bangladesh
- ODI debut (cap 187): 1 August 2018 v South Africa
- Last ODI: 5 August 2018 v South Africa

Career statistics
Competition	Test	ODI	FC	LA
Matches	22	2	114	79
Runs scored	255	10	1,466	210
Batting average	7.96	10.00	12.11	9.54
100s/50s	0/0	0/0	0/4	0/0
Top score	28*	10*	81	23
Balls bowled	7,163	96	23,944	3,824
Wickets	122	0	473	129
Bowling average	31.37	–	28.05	19.76
5 wickets in innings	12	–	37	4
10 wickets in match	3	–	9	0
Best bowling	7/52	–	7/26	7/17
Catches/stumpings	4/–	0/–	34/–	19/–
- Source: Cricinfo, 29 June 2025

Neketh Gedara Roshan Prabath Jayasuriya, commonly known as Prabath Jayasuriya (born 5 November 1991), is a professional Sri Lankan cricketer who plays for the national team in Tests and ODIs. In domestic matches, he plays for Colts Cricket Club and Jaffna Stallions. He bowls left arm orthodox spin and a lower order batsman who can bat a bit.

Jayasuriya is quickest Sri Lankan bowler to reach both 50 and 100 Test wickets in Sri Lanka.

== Education ==
Jayasuriya is a past pupil of Christ Church College, Matale and Lumbini College, Colombo.

== Domestic career ==
He went onto represent Christ Church College U-13 and U-15 teams as well as Matale District XI U-15 team at the 2006 SLC Inter District Tournament. He was later chosen by the Matale Cricket Club to play in the 2007 Sara Division 1 Tournament.

He made his List A debut on 6 December 2011 for Colombo Cricket Club against Sri Lanka Army during the 2011/12 Premier Limited Over Tournament. He made his first-class debut playing for Colombo Cricket Club against Kurunegala Youth Cricket Club on 10 February 2012 during the 2011/12 Premier League Tournament Tier B. He made his T20 debut playing for Colombo Cricket Club against the Lankan Cricket Club on 26 March 2012 during the 2011/12 CSN Premier Clubs T20 Tournament.

In March 2018, he was named in Kandy's squad for the 2017–18 Super Four Provincial Tournament. The following month, he was also named in Kandy's squad for the 2018 Super Provincial One Day Tournament.

In August 2018, he was named in Galle's squad the 2018 SLC T20 League. In March 2019, he was named in Dambulla's squad for the 2019 Super Provincial One Day Tournament. In October 2020, he was drafted by the Jaffna Stallions for the inaugural edition of the Lanka Premier League.

In March 2021, he was part of the Sinhalese Sports Club team that won the 2020–21 SLC Twenty20 Tournament, the first time they had won the tournament since 2005. In August 2021, he was named in the SLC Greys team for the 2021 SLC Invitational T20 League tournament.

== International career ==
In July 2018, he was named in Sri Lanka's One Day International (ODI) squad for their series against South Africa. He made his ODI debut for Sri Lanka against South Africa on 1 August 2018.

He was on the verge of making his test debut during the home test series against Bangladesh way back in April 2021 as an injury replacement to Lasith Embuldeniya but he was not included in the squad for failing skinfold fitness tests and Praveen Jayawickrama who had just 10 first-class games experience under his belt got the nod over the experienced premiere spinner at domestic level. The reason for his exclusion was initially reported by media that Jayasiriya had failed to complete the mandatory two kilometre fitness run inside eight minutes which was in force during the tenure of Mickey Arthur as head coach but the reports were rubbished by SLC as it clarified that Jayasuriya was snubbed based on his skinfold tests. Following Jayawickrama's incredible start to test cricket with twin fifers on debut against Bangladesh, the hopes of Jayasuriya making a case for himself at test level started to wane and Jayasuriya fell under the radar. Despite being a consistent performer at first-class level, Jayasuriya was made to wait for too longer.

In July 2022, he was added to Sri Lanka's Test squad for the second match against Australia. He was included to the final test at the last minute under most dramatic circumstances as Jayawickrama was diagnosed with COVID-19 after testing positive while lead spinner Lasith Embuldeniya was dropped by selectors due to poor run of form. With the lack of backup frontline spinners, captain Dimuth Karunaratne brought Prabath Jayasuriya in the lineup to face Australia in the decisive test having played alongside him for the same club. He made his Test debut on 8 July 2022, for Sri Lanka against Australia. On his debut, he took a five-wicket haul, with figures of 6/118. In the second innings of the match, he took another five-wicket haul, to finish with the best bowling figures for a Sri Lanka player on debut and fourth best overall, with 12 for 177. He also became the second bowler for Sri Lanka to take two five-wicket hauls on Test debut after Praveen Jayawickrama. He was adjudged man of the match award for his match winning bowling performance. He also ended up as the leading wicket taker of the series with 12 scalps despite missing the first test.

In July 2022, he was called to the Test squad as the premium spinner for the series against Pakistan. During the first test of the series against Pakistan, he picked up his third career five-wicket haul in an innings of a test match to become only the third bowler to grab five wicket hauls in his first three test innings since debut after Tom Richardson and Clarrie Grimmett. With record 21 scalps after just two test appearances, he is only behind Narendra Hirwani and Alec Bedser in picking up most test wickets after their first two test matches. He also became the third Sri Lankan bowler after Muttiah Muralitharan and Rangana Herath to secure three consecutive five wicket hauls in consecutive innings in test cricket.

During the second test of the series against Pakistan, he picked up his fourth career five-wicket haul in an innings of a test match to become the seventh bowler overall to take fifers in first three test match appearances and also to become the fifth bowler to claim four five-wicket hauls in first three test appearances from debut. He was awarded player of the series for his impressive performances with the ball which helped Sri Lanka to level the two match test series 1–1 against Pakistan and he also ended up as the top wicket taker of the series with 17 scalps. He made giant leaps in test cricket after a prolific start to his test career by picking up 29 wickets in his first three test matches and he is only behind Hirwani and Charles Turner for taking most number of wickets after their first three test matches.

During the New Zealand tour in March 2023, he took only 4 wickets for 224 runs in two matches, where Sri Lanka lost the series 2-0. However, against Ireland in the home test series in April 2023, Jayasuriya took his second ten-wicket haul with 7–52 in first innings and 3–56 in the second innings. Sri Lanka finally won the match by an innings and 280 runs and Jayasuriya won the man of the match award. In the second match of the series, he took another five-wicket haul of 5 for 174 runs, his sixth five-for in the format. After a strong batting performance by Sri Lanka, Ireland suffered another defeat by an innings and 10 runs, where Jayasuriya won the player of the series award for taking 17 wickets in the series. In the process, he also became the fastest spinner to 50 Test wickets in just seven matches. Against Pakistan in July 2023, he took only 9 wickets and Sri Lanka lost the series 2-0.

On 3 February 2024, against Afghanistan, Jayasuriya took his 7th Test five-wicket haul with 5-107 in the second innings. Sri Lanka eventually won the one-off test series by 10 wickets and Jayasuriya won the man of the match award for his 8 dismissals in the match.

In the first Test against New Zealand, Jayasuriya delivered a match-winning five-wicket haul in the second, where Sri Lanka won the match by 63 runs. This was his eighth five-wicket haul, and seventh in Galle. With the match figures of 4/136 in first innings and 5/68 in the second innings, he won the man of the match award. In the first innings of the second Test, Jayasuriya took his ninth five-wicket haul and finished with 6 for 42, where New Zealand bundled out for 88, their lowest all-out total against Sri Lanka. In the second innings, he took 3 more wickets, where Sri Lanka won the match by an innings and 154 runs and series 2–0, where Jayasuriya won the player of the series award.

== Awards ==
- ICC Men's Player of the Month: July 2022
- Sri Lanka Cricket Best Men's Test Bowler of the Year: 2025
