= Milan Rathnayake =

Sri Lankan cricketer

Personal information
- Full name: Rathnayake Mudiyanselage Milan Priyanath Rathnayake
- Born: 1 August 1996 (age 30); Kurunegala, Sri Lanka
- Nickname: Milan
- Height: 6 ft 0 in (1.83 m)
- Batting: Left-handed
- Bowling: Right-arm medium-fast
- Role: Bowling All-rounder

International information
- National side: Sri Lanka (2024–present)
- Test debut (cap 166): 21 August 2024 v England
- Last Test: 26 September 2024 v New Zealand
- ODI debut (cap 217): 2 July 2025 v Bangladesh
- Last ODI: 5 July 2025 v Bangladesh

Domestic team information
- Years: Team
- 2016–2019: Sri Lanka Air Force Sports Club
- 2020–present: Moors Sports Club

Career statistics
Competition	Test	FC	LA	T20
Matches	4	52	46	22
Runs scored	151	1,013	112	52
Batting average	30.20	18.41	5.09	10.40
100s/50s	0/1	0/3	0/0	0/0
Top score	72	72	24*	16
Balls bowled	475	5,747	1,589	375
Wickets	10	117	48	24
Bowling average	32.80	29.58	27.77	17.87
5 wickets in innings	0	1	0	1
10 wickets in match	0	0	0	0
Best bowling	3/56	5/36	4/31	6/12
Catches/stumpings	3/–	32/–	11/–	8/–
- Source: Cricinfo, 2 July 2025

Rathnayake Mudiyanselage Milan Priyanath Rathnayake (born 1 August 1996) is a Sri Lankan professional cricket right-arm medium-fast bowler and left-handed batter who plays for the Sri Lanka national team and Moors Sports Club. He made his international debut in 2024.

== Career ==
Rathnayake made his List A debut for Tincomalee District in the 2016–17 Districts One Day Tournament on 19 March 2017. He made his Twenty20 debut for Sri Lanka Air Force Sports Club in the 2017–18 SLC Twenty20 Tournament on 24 February 2018.

In February 2023, Rathnayake was selected for Sri Lanka's Test squad for their series against New Zealand. In April 2023, he was again named in Test squad for the series against Ireland.

In August 2024, he was named in Sri Lanka's Test squad for their test tour to play three match test series against England. He made his test debut on 21 August 2024 against England at Old Trafford and walked out to bat at number nine position for Sri Lanka on his debut and he came out to bat at a crucial time when Sri Lanka were under all sorts of trouble at 113 for the loss of 7 wickets. On the first day of the test match on his debut, he scored a half-century and was dismissed after scoring a valiant 72 after facing 135 deliveries, as he engaged in a lower order resistance and fightback, batting way down the order to rescue Sri Lanka from a precarious position to a somewhat respectable competitive total of 236 runs on the board in the first innings. He also eventually ended up as the second best batter for Sri Lanka besides the skipper Dhananjaya de Silva during Sri Lanka's first innings scorecard of 236 and he also broke India's Balwinder Sandhu's test record for the best individual test batting performance by a number nine batsman on test debut in an innings.
