= 2022 SLC National Super League =

Cricket tournament

2022 SLC National Super
- Dates: 24 January – 19 February 2022
- Administrator: Sri Lanka Cricket
- Cricket format: Limited overs
- Tournament format: Round-robin then knockout
- Host: Sri Lanka
- Champions: Team Jaffna
- Participants: 5
- Matches: 21

The National Super League Limited Over Tournament is a limited overs cricket tournament which was held in Sri Lanka from 24 January to 19 February 2022. The first phase of the 50-over competition was played in two venues: SSC and P. Sara Oval. The second phase of the round-robin stage was played in Pallekelle and Dambulla, where the final was played on 19 February.

== Squads ==
The following teams and squads were named for the tournament.

Team Dambulla	Team Colombo	Team Jaffna	Team Galle	Team Kandy
Ashan Priyanjan (c); Wanindu Hasaranga; Bhanuka Rajapaksa; Minod Bhanuka; Vishwa Fernando; Pavan Rathnayake; Gayan Maneeshan; Ron Chandraguptha; Sonal Dinusha; Lasith Abeyratne; Lahiru Samarakoon; Nuwan Thushara; Anuk Fernando; Lakshan Sandakan; Duvindu Tillakaratne; Sameera Sadamal; Dushan Hemantha; Amshi de Silva	Dasun Shanaka (c); Dimuth Karunaratne; Danushka Gunathilaka; Avishka Fernando; Krishan Sanjula; Ashen Bandara; Charith Asalanka; Shammu Ashan; Kusal Mendis; Lahiru Madushanka; Kalana Perera; Himesh Ramanayake; Mohomed Dilshad; Prabath Jayasuriya; Tharindu Ratnayake; Kavindu Nadeeshan; Nipun Dananjaya; Nuwanidu Fernando; Roshen Silva; Sachitha Jayathilake	Dhananjaya de Silva (c); Sadeera Samarawickrama; Nishan Madushka; Lahiru Thirimanne; Navod Paranavithana; Janith Liyanage; Santhush Gunathilake; Ishan Jayaratne; Ravindu Fernando; Suranga Lakmal; Nuwan Pradeep; Shiran Fernando; Binura Fernando; Jeffrey Vandersay; Dilum Sudeera; Saminda Fernando; Pramod Madushan; Nipun Malinga; Kasun Madushanka; Vijayakanth Viyaskanth	Angelo Mathews (c); Ashan Randika; Dinesh Chandimal; Himasha Liyanage; Muditha Lakshan; Asela Gunaratne; Vishad Randika; Dhananjaya Lakshan; Ramesh Mendis; Mohamed Shiraz; Kavishka Anjula; Jehan Daniel; Maheesh Theekshana; Praveen Jayawickrama; Nimesh Vimukthi; Mohammed Shamaaz; Priyamal Perera; Suminda Lakshan; Akila Dananjaya; Heshan Hettiarchchi	Kamindu Mendis (c); Kamil Mishara; Pathum Nissanka; Lasith Croospulle; Oshada Fernando; Niroshan Dickwella; Sahan Arachchige; Chaturanga de Silva; Chamika Karunaratne; Lahiru Kumara; Chamika Gunasekara; Dushmantha Chameera; Asitha Fernando; Ashian Daniel; Angelo Perera; Pulina Tharanga; Ashian Daniel; Lahiru Udara; Vishva Chathuranga; Thikshila de Silva; Lasanda Rukmal; Nipun Ransika; Sachindu Colombage

== Points table ==
Pos	Team	Pld	W	L	NR	Pts	NRR
1	Team Kandy (R)	8	6	1	1	30	1.455
2	Team Jaffna (C)	8	5	3	0	22	0.501
3	Team Galle	8	4	4	0	17	−0.563
4	Team Colombo	8	3	5	0	14	0.366
5	Team Dambulla	8	1	6	1	7	−1.827

Source: Cricinfo
(C) Champions; (R) Runners-up

Advanced to the Final

== Fixtures and results ==
The SLC confirmed the fixtures for the tournament on 23 January 2022.

=== Round-robin ===
Match 1
24 January 2022
9:45
Scorecard

Team Colombo; 213/10 (47.3 overs)	v	Team Galle; 215/7 (42.4 overs)
Krishan Sanjula 46 (81); Maheesh Theekshana 3/42 (9 overs)		Priyamal Perera 98* (112); Prabath Jayasuriya 2/40 (10 overs)

Team Galle won by 3 wickets
Singhalese Sports Club Cricket Ground, Colombo
Umpires: Gamini Dissanayake and Chandrika Amarasinghe

- Team Colombo won the toss and elected to bat.

Match 2
24 January 2022
9:45
Scorecard

Team Jaffna; 255/10 (47.1 overs)	v	Team Dambulla; 79 (25.5 overs)
Dhananjaya de Silva 69(64); Vishwa Fernando 3/41 (8 overs)		Ashan Priyanjan 32 (42); Dhananjaya de Silva 3/5 (4 overs)

Team Jaffna won by 176 runs
Paikiasothy Saravanamuttu Stadium, Colombo
Umpires: Ranmore Martinesz and Ravindra Kottahachchi

- Team Dambulla won the toss and elected to field.

Match 3
26 January 2022
9:45
Scorecard

Team Jaffna; 246/8 (50 overs)	v	Team Kandy; 247/4 (39.4 overs)
Lahiru Thirimanne 56 (74); Nipun Ransika 3/41 (8 overs)		Niroshan Dickwella 69 (45); Shiran Fernando 2/33 (7 overs)

Team Kandy won by 6 wickets
Singhalese Sports Club Cricket Ground, Colombo
Umpires: Gamini Dissanayake and Asanga Jayasooriya

- Team Kandy won the toss elected to field.

Match 4
26 January 2022
9:45
Scorecard

Team Dambulla; 143/10 (40 overs)	v	Team Colombo; 144/3 (20.4 overs)
Lasith Abeyratne 41 (53); Prabath Jayasuriya 3/35 (10 overs)		Kusal Mendis 67 (44); Nuwan Thushara 1/19 (2.4 overs)

Team Colombo won by 7 wickets
Paikiasothy Saravanamuttu Stadium, Colombo
Umpires: Keerthi Bandara and Ranmore Martinesz

- Team Dambulla won the toss and elected to bat.

Match 5
28 January 2022
9:45
Scorecard

Team Dambulla; 165 (49.3 overs)	v	Team Galle; 166/7 (34.2 overs)
Pavan Rathnayake 44 (75); Heshan Hettiarchchi 3/31 (10 overs)		Ashan Randika 49 (38); Lahiru Samarakoon 3/37 (7 overs)

Team Galle won by 3 wickets
Singhalese Sports Club Cricket Ground, Colombo
Umpires: Asanga Jayasooriya and Rohitha Kottahachchi

- Team Galle won the toss and elected to field.

Match 6
28 January 2022
9:45
Scorecard

Team Kandy; 271 (50 overs)	v	Team Colombo; 274/4 (48.1 overs)
Sahan Arachchige 86 (85); Lahiru Madushanka 4/54 (9 overs)		Nipun Dananjaya 70 (79); Lasith Embuldeniya 2/48 (10 overs)

Colombo won by 6 wickets
Paikiasothy Saravanamuttu Stadium, Colombo
Umpires: Gamini Dissanayake and Rohitha Kottahachchi

- Team Kandy won the toss and elected to bat.

Match 7
30 January 2022
9:45
Scorecard

Team Kandy; 318/9 (50 overs)	v	Team Dambulla; 163 (42.1 overs)
Oshada Fernando 138 (141); Lahiru Samarakoon 4/87 (10 overs)		Ashan Priyanjan 50 (79); Pulina Tharanga 3/39 (9.1 overs)

Team Kandy won by 155 runs
Singhalese Sports Club Cricket Ground, Colombo
Umpires: Gamini Dissanayake and Rohitha Kottahachchi

- Team Dambulla won the toss and elected to field.

Match 8
30 January 2022
9:45
Scorecard

Team Jaffna; 263 (49.5)	v	Team Galle; 175 (36.2 overs)
Santhush Gunathilake 57 (110); Dhananjaya Lakshan 3/37 (7 overs)		Jehan Daniel 36 (48); Dhananjaya de Silva 4/27 (6.2 overs)

Team Jaffna won by 88 runs
Paikiasothy Saravanamuttu Stadium, Colombo
Umpires: Ranmore Martinesz and Keerthi Bandara

- Team Galle won the toss and elected to field.

Match 9
1 February 2022
9:45
Scorecard

Team Colombo; 247/8 (50 overs)	v	Team Jaffna; 248/4 (46.4 overs)
Ashen Bandara 75 (110); Nimanda Madushanka 4/39 (8 overs)		Sadeera Samarawickrama 91* (95); Tharindu Rathnayake 2/56 (10 overs)

Team Jaffna won by 6 wickets
Singhalese Sports Club Cricket Ground, Colombo
Umpires: Asanga Jayasooriya and Keerthi Bandara

- Team Colombo won the toss and elected to bat.

Match 10
1 February 2022
9:45
Scorecard

Team Kandy; 269 (47.3 overs)	v	Team Galle; 173 (42.2 overs)
Lahiru Udara 63 (84); Akila Dananjaya 5/61 (10 overs)		Pabasara Waduge 50 (88); Pulina Tharanga 6/29 (7.2 overs)

Team Kandy won by 96 runs
Paikiasothy Saravanamuttu Stadium, Colombo
Umpires: Ranmore Martinesz and Ravindra Kottahachchi

- Team Galle won the toss and elected to field.

Match 11
4 February 2022
9:45
Scorecard

Team Jaffna; 266/8 (50 overs)	v	Team Dambulla; 215/9 (50 overs)
Dhananjaya de Silva 101 (120); Lahiru Samarakoon 4/61 (10 overs)		Sameera Sadamal 46 (54); Nuwan Pradeep 3/40 (7 overs)

Team Jaffna won by 51 runs
Pallekele International Cricket Stadium, Kandy
Umpires: Pradeep Udawatta and Raveendra Wimalasiri
Player of the match: Team Dambulla won the toss and elected to field.

- Team Dambulla won the toss and elected to field.

Match 12
4 February 2022
9:45
Scorecard

Team Galle; 225 (49.1 overs)	v	Team Colombo; 181 (45.5 overs)
Kavishka Anjula 75 (73); Lahiru Madushanka 2/18 (9.1 overs)		Lahiru Madushanka 43 (56); Chalana de Silva 3/27 (8.5 overs)

Team Galle won by 44 runs
Rangiri Dambulla International Stadium, Dambulla
Umpires: Lyndon Hannibal and Deepal Gunawardene

- Team Galle won the toss and elected to bat.

Match 13
7 February 2022
9:45
Scorecard

Team Colombo; 317/6 (50 overs)	v	Team Dambulla; 210 (48.3 overs)
Sithara Gimhan 110 (104); Dushan Hemantha 3/56 (7 overs)		Lasith Abeyratne 57 (77); Kalana Pereira 3/30 (9 overs)

Team Colombo won by 107 runs
Pallekele International Cricket Stadium, Kandy
Umpires: Hemantha Boteju and Raveendra Wimalasiri

- Team Dambulla won the toss and elected to field.

Match 14
7 February 2022
9:45
Scorecard

Team Jaffna; 109 (30.2 overs)	v	Team Kandy; 110/5 (27 overs)
Sadeera Samarawickrama 31 (30); Ashian Daniel 5/27 (6.2 overs)		Niroshan Dickwella 45 (34); Nuwan Pradeep 2/19 (7 overs)

Team Kandy won by 5 wickets
Rangiri Dambulla International Stadium, Dambulla
Umpires: Vidura Prasad and Lyndon Hannibal

- Team Kandy won the toss and elected to field.

Match 15
10 February 2022
9:45
Scorecard

Team Colombo; 271 (49.3 overs)	v	Team Kandy; 272/4 (48.5 overs)
Nuwanidu Fernando 112 (133); Asitha Fernando 3/41 (9.3 overs)		Oshada Fernando 85* (94); Lahiru Madushanka 2/34 (8 overs)

Kandy won by 6 wickets
Pallekele International Cricket Stadium, Kandy
Umpires: Pradeep Udawatta and Raveendra Wimalasiri

- Team Colombo won the toss and elected to bat.

Match 16
10 February 2022
9:45
Scorecard

Team Galle; 125 (33.4 overs)	v	Team Dambulla; 126/5 (24.5 overs)
Himasha Liyanage 29 (49); Duvindu Tillakaratne 4/21 (10 overs)		Dushan Hemantha 28 (34); Dhananjaya Lakshan 1/16 (2 overs)

Team Dambulla won by 5 wickets
Rangiri Dambulla International Stadium, Dambulla
Umpires: Lyndon Hannibal and Deepal Gunawardene

- Team Dambulla won the toss and elected to field.

Match 17
13 February 2022
9:45
Scorecard

Team Jaffna; 272/5 (50 overs)	v	Team Galle; 197/2 (21.3 overs)
Dhananjaya de Silva 109* (106); Akila Dhananjaya 2/51 (10 overs)		Pabasara Waduge 92 (70); Dhananjaya de Silva 1/42 (5 overs)

Team Galle won by 8 wickets
Pallekele International Cricket Stadium, Kandy
Umpires: Hemantha Boteju and Rohitha Kottahachchi

- Team Galle won the toss and elected to field.

Match 18
13 February 2022
9:45
Scorecard

Team Dambulla	v	Team Kandy

Abandoned
Rangiri Dambulla International Stadium, Dambulla
Umpires: Lyndon Hannibal and Asanga Jayasooriya

Match 19
16 February 2022
9:45
Scorecard

Team Jaffna; 272/5 (46 overs)	v	Team Galle; 191/2 (21.3/25 overs)
Dhananjaya De Silva 109(106); Akila Dananjaya 2/51(10 overs)		Pabasara Waduge 92(70); Dhananjaya De Silva 1/42 (8 overs)

Team Galle Won by 8 wickets (D/L method)
Pallekele International Cricket Stadium, Kandy
Umpires: Asanga Jayasooriya and Ravindra Kottahachchi

Match 20
16 February 2022
9:45
Scorecard

Team Colombo; 195/8 (50 overs)	v	Team Jaffna; 198/6 (46.5 overs)
Roshen Silva 64* (77); Nuwan Pradeep (2/22 7 overs)		Dhananjaya de Silva 79* (93); Tharindu Ratnayake 2/44 (10 overs)

Team Jaffna won by 4 wickets
Rangiri Dambulla International Stadium, Dambulla
Umpires: Prageeth Rambukwella and Kumar Dharmasena

- Team Jaffna won the toss and elected to field.

=== Final ===
Match 21
19 February 2022
14:30 (D/N)
Scorecard

Team Jaffna; 258 (48.3 overs)	v	Team Kandy; 221 (45.5 overs)
Dunith Wellalage 74 (87); Asitha Fernando 5/44 (9.3 overs)		Kamindu Mendis 46 (73); Pramod Madushan 4/59 (10 overs)

Team Jaffna won by 37 runs
Pallekele International Cricket Stadium, Kandy
Umpires: Kumar Dharmasena and Raveendra Wimalasiri

- Team Kandy won the toss and elected to field.

== See also ==
- National Super League Limited Over Tournament
- 2024 National Super League Limited Over Tournament
