= 2019–20 Premier League Tournament =

Cricket tournament

- Dates: 31 January – 27 August 2020
- Administrator: Sri Lanka Cricket
- Cricket format: First-class cricket
- Tournament format: Round-robin then knockout
- Host: Sri Lanka
- Champions: Colombo Cricket Club (7th title)
- Participants: 14
- Matches: 67
- Most runs: Lahiru Udara (1,039)
- Most wickets: Duvindu Tillakaratne (61)

The 2019–20 Premier League Tournament was the 32nd season of first-class cricket in Sri Lanka's Premier Trophy. The tournament started on 31 January 2020 and was originally scheduled to conclude on 12 April 2020. Fourteen teams took part in the competition, split into two groups of seven. Sri Lanka Ports Authority Cricket Club were relegated at the end of the previous tournament, with Lankan Cricket Club replacing them in this tournament after they gained promotion from Tier B. Colombo Cricket Club were the defending champions.

On 16 March 2020, following the conclusion of the group stage fixtures, Sri Lanka Cricket postponed the rest of the tournament due to the COVID-19 pandemic. In July 2020, Sri Lanka Cricket announced that the tournament would resume on 14 July 2020, to allow for the completion of the Plate League and Super Eight rounds. However, the resumption was further delayed by the tournament committee, pending approval of the amended tournament rules and structure. After a further delay due to the 2020 Sri Lankan parliamentary elections, the tournament restarted on 10 August 2020.

Moors Sports Club won the Plate League, and Colombo Cricket Club retained their title, with an unassailable lead ahead of the final round of Super Eight matches. In the final round of matches, Dinesh Chandimal scored 354 not out, batting for Sri Lanka Army Sports Club. It was the highest first-class score in a domestic match in Sri Lanka, beating the previous record of 351 runs scored by Kithuruwan Vithanage.

== Teams ==
The following teams competed:

Group A

- Burgher Recreation Club
- Colombo Cricket Club
- Colts Cricket Club
- Moors Sports Club
- Negombo Cricket Club
- Sinhalese Sports Club
- Sri Lanka Army Sports Club

Group B

- Badureliya Sports Club
- Chilaw Marians Cricket Club
- Lankan Cricket Club
- Nondescripts Cricket Club
- Ragama Cricket Club
- Saracens Sports Club
- Tamil Union Cricket and Athletic Club

== Points table ==
Group A

Team	Pld	W	L	D	T	Pts
Colombo Cricket Club	6	4	0	2	0	97.50
Colts Cricket Club	6	2	2	2	0	69.75
Sri Lanka Army Sports Club	6	2	2	2	0	61.14
Burgher Recreation Club	6	1	3	2	0	55.25
Negombo Cricket Club	6	1	1	4	0	49.25
Sinhalese Sports Club	6	1	0	5	0	47.59
Moors Sports Club	6	0	3	3	0	35.44

Team qualified for the Super Eight

Group B

Team	Pld	W	L	D	T	Pts
Chilaw Marians Cricket Club	6	3	2	1	0	65.71
Nondescripts Cricket Club	6	1	0	5	0	62.12
Saracens Sports Club	6	1	2	3	0	60.50
Ragama Cricket Club	6	2	1	3	0	56.46
Tamil Union Cricket and Athletic Club	6	1	1	4	0	44.53
Badureliya Sports Club	6	1	1	4	0	38.77
Lankan Cricket Club	6	0	2	4	0	27.98

Team qualified for the Super Eight

Super Eight

Team	Pld	W	L	D	T	Pts
Colombo Cricket Club	7	4	0	3	0	95.19
Nondescripts Cricket Club	7	2	0	5	0	83.10
Chilaw Marians Cricket Club	7	2	1	4	0	81.85
Ragama Cricket Club	7	2	2	3	0	68.91
Colts Cricket Club	7	1	3	3	0	58.60
Sri Lanka Army Sports Club	7	1	2	4	0	51.78
Saracens Sports Club	7	1	2	4	0	47.83
Burgher Recreation Club	7	0	3	4	0	45.85

Champions

Plate League

Team	Pld	W	L	D	T	Pts
Moors Sports Club	5	2	0	3	0	67.89
Negombo Cricket Club	5	1	0	4	0	59.00
Tamil Union Cricket and Athletic Club	5	1	1	3	0	41.46
Sinhalese Sports Club	5	0	0	5	0	38.42
Lankan Cricket Club	5	0	2	3	0	34.59
Badureliya Sports Club	5	0	1	4	0	27.58

Relegated to Tier B

== Group stage ==
=== Group A ===
==== Round 1 ====
31 January–2 February 2020
Scorecard

Colombo Cricket Club	v	Sinhalese Sports Club
548 (119 overs); Lasith Abeyratne 153 (191); Akash Senaratne 4/120 (28 overs)		260 (68.1 overs); Kavindu Kulasekara 84 (138); Usman Ishak 4/67 (11.1 overs)
133/1d (28 overs); Ron Chandraguptha 70* (87); Jeffrey Vandersay 1/23 (5 overs)		178/9 (56 overs); Dasun Shanaka 52 (76); Wanindu Hasaranga 6/76 (23 overs)

Match drawn
Colombo Cricket Club Ground, Colombo
Umpires: Vidura Prasad and Ruchira Palliyaguruge

- Colombo Cricket Club won the toss and elected to bat.
- MPM Weerasinghe (Colombo Cricket Club) and Sohan de Livera (Sinhalese Sports Club) both made their first-class debuts.

31 January–2 February 2020
Scorecard

Sri Lanka Army Sports Club	v	Burgher Recreation Club
435 (125.4 overs); Lakshan Edirisinghe 99 (206); Duvindu Tillakaratne 4/80 (24.4 overs)		88 (25.5 overs); Bhanuka Rajapaksa 19* (44); Dushan Vimukthi 5/20 (7.5 overs)
		172 (48.1 overs) (f/o); Sagar Mangalorkar 50 (69); Dushan Vimukthi 4/49 (16.1 overs)

Sri Lanka Army Sports Club won by an innings and 175 runs
Sri Lanka Army Ordnance Corps International Cricket Stadium, Horana
Umpires: Ravindra Kottahachchi and Asanga Jayasooriya

- Burgher Recreation Club won the toss and elected to field.
- Mahesh Kumara, Sanjeew Coomaraswamy, Heshan Hettiarchchi and Hansha Pramodya (Sri Lanka Army Sports Club) all made their first-class debuts.

31 January–2 February 2020
Scorecard

Moors Sports Club	v	Negombo Cricket Club
652/8d (109.1 overs); Ramesh Mendis 300* (270); Roshen Fernando 3/101 (19 overs)		306 (69.3 overs); Roscoe Thattil 77 (76); Ramesh Mendis 4/74 (14.3 overs)
		317/5 (86 overs) (f/o); Ashen Silva 102 (203); Praveen Jayawickrama 2/67 (20 overs)

Match drawn
Moors Sports Club Ground, Colombo
Umpires: Rohitha Kottahachchi and Nilan De Silva

- Negombo Cricket Club won the toss and elected to field.
- Ramesh Mendis (Moors Sports Club) scored his maiden double century in first-class cricket, and went on to convert it into his maiden triple century in first-class cricket.

==== Round 2 ====
7–9 February 2020
Scorecard

Sri Lanka Army Sports Club	v	Colts Cricket Club
270 (89.3 overs); Asela Gunaratne 87 (162); Dilruwan Perera 5/58 (27.3 overs)		336 (100.1 overs); Vishad Randika 132 (249); Malka Madusanka 3/83 (32 overs)
268 (68.4 overs); Dinesh Chandimal 89 (119); Dilruwan Perera 3/62 (15.4 overs)

Match drawn
Colts Cricket Club Ground, Colombo
Umpires: Hemantha Boteju and Ruchira Palliyaguruge

- Sri Lanka Army Sports Club won the toss and elected to bat.
- Nipun Malinga (Colts Cricket Club) made his first-class debut.

7–9 February 2020
Scorecard

Negombo Cricket Club	v	Sinhalese Sports Club
428 (111.3 overs); Dilshan Munaweera 120 (153); Tharindu Ratnayake 4/125 (29.3 overs)		409 (107.2 overs); Dasun Shanaka 130 (177); Upul Indrasiri 5/110 (36.2 overs)
126/3 (34 overs); Dilshan Munaweera 49 (23); Tharindu Ratnayake 2/46 (12 overs)

Match drawn
Sinhalese Sports Club Ground, Colombo
Umpires: Gamini Dissanayake and Prageeth Rambukwella

- Sinhalese Sports Club won the toss and elected to field.

7–9 February 2020
Scorecard

Colombo Cricket Club	v	Burgher Recreation Club
416 (77.1 overs); Minod Bhanuka 108 (105); Duvindu Tillakaratne 6/102 (18 overs)		277 (65.2 overs); Bhanuka Rajapaksa 85 (60); Malinda Pushpakumara 4/63 (23 overs)
267/6d (52 overs); MPM Weerasinghe 82 (120); Duvindu Tillakaratne 4/93 (15 overs)		261 (67.5 overs); Bhanuka Rajapaksa 93 (70); Ashan Priyanjan 5/42 (13 overs)

Colombo Cricket Club won by 145 runs
Burgher Recreation Club Ground, Colombo
Umpires: Deepal Gunawardene and Lyndon Hannibal

- Colombo Cricket Club won the toss and elected to bat.

==== Round 3 ====
14–16 February 2020
Scorecard

Sri Lanka Army Sports Club	v	Negombo Cricket Club
155 (42.1 overs); Himasha Liyanage 56 (82); Upul Indrasiri 3/73 (20 overs)		484/9d (112.3 overs); Saad Nasim 139 (130); Malka Madusanka 3/126 (23 overs)
398 (97.5 overs); Dinesh Chandimal 163* (200); Roshen Fernando 3/60 (20 overs)		74/2 (7.3 overs); Saad Nasim 40* (21); Janith Silva 1/28 (4 overs)

Negombo Cricket Club won by 8 wickets
Moors Sports Club Ground, Colombo
Umpires: Rohitha Kottahachchi and Pradeep Udawatta

- Sri Lanka Army Sports Club won the toss and elected to bat.
- Pathum Dilshan (Sri Lanka Army Sports Club) made his first-class debut.

14–16 February 2020
Scorecard

Moors Sports Club	v	Burgher Recreation Club
353 (77.3 overs); Sachithra Serasinghe 94 (119); Duvindu Tillakaratne 3/103 (27 overs)		238 (64.5 overs); Raminda Wijesooriya 61 (71); Sachithra Serasinghe 5/80 (19.5 overs)
137 (31.1 overs); Pabasara Waduge 74 (64); Tharindu Kaushal 4/30 (10 overs)		253/8 (61 overs); Bhanuka Rajapaksa 69 (45); Ayana Siriwardhana 3/72 (12 overs)

Burgher Recreation Club won by 2 wickets
Burgher Recreation Club Ground, Colombo
Umpires: Gamini Dissanayake and Keerthi Bandara

- Moors Sports Club won the toss and elected to bat.

14–16 February 2020
Scorecard

Sinhalese Sports Club	v	Colts Cricket Club
301 (76 overs); Sandun Weerakkody 55 (50); Prabath Jayasuriya 5/89 (27 overs)		183 (58.1 overs); Heshan Dhanushka 66 (146); Sachithra Senanayake 5/52 (28 overs)
175 (56.5 overs); Sachithra Senanayake 33 (75); Dilruwan Perera 4/45 (21 overs)		205 (73.2 overs); Vishad Randika 69 (157); Sachithra Senanayake 5/59 (26 overs)

Sinhalese Sports Club won by 88 runs
Colts Cricket Club Ground, Colombo
Umpires: Ravindra Kottahachchi and Lyndon Hannibal

- Sinhalese Sports Club won the toss and elected to bat.
- Heshan Dhanushka (Colts Cricket Club) made his first-class debut.

==== Round 4 ====
21–23 February 2020
Scorecard

Colombo Cricket Club	v	Negombo Cricket Club
142 (43 overs); Lasith Abeyratne 59 (97); Roshen Fernando 3/22 (11 overs)		141 (35.5 overs); Pasindu Lakshanka 43 (57); Ashan Priyanjan 6/24 (11 overs)
369 (79.2 overs); Ashan Priyanjan 84 (97); Lakshitha Manasinghe 5/126 (21 overs)		282 (63.2 overs); Dilshan Munaweera 77 (80); Ashan Priyanjan 5/101 (21 overs)

Colombo Cricket Club won by 88 runs
Burgher Recreation Club Ground, Colombo
Umpires: Hemantha Boteju and Keerthi Bandara

- Colombo Cricket Club won the toss and elected to bat.
- Kavindu Nadeeshan (Colombo Cricket Club) made his first-class debut.

21–23 February 2020
Scorecard

Colts Cricket Club	v	Moors Sports Club
214 (71.3 overs); Heshan Dhanushka 49 (147); Chathura Randunu 5/42 (22.3 overs)		264 (97.4 overs); Dinuka Dilshan 118 (297); Dilruwan Perera 4/76 (36.4 overs)
254/7d (59 overs); Sadeera Samarawickrama 52 (42); Sachithra Serasinghe 2/23 (7 overs)		116 (44.2 overs); Anuk Fernando 33* (86); Dilruwan Perera 5/31 (22 overs)

Colts Cricket Club won by 88 runs
Moors Sports Club Ground, Colombo
Umpires: Rohitha Kottahachchi and Deepal Gunawardene

- Colts Cricket Club won the toss and elected to bat.
- Dinuka Dilshan (Moors Sports Club) made his first-class debut.

22–24 February 2020
Scorecard

Sinhalese Sports Club	v	Burgher Recreation Club
305 (91.1 overs); Nuwanidu Fernando 109 (182); Duvindu Tillakaratne 3/87 (32 overs)		456/8d (113 overs); Deshan Dias 152* (230); Akash Senaratne 3/100 (23 overs)
153/9 (44 overs); Sandun Weerakkody 56 (45); Duvindu Tillakaratne 5/48 (19 overs)

Match drawn
Sri Lanka Army Ordnance Corps International Cricket Stadium, Horana
Umpires: Pradeep Udawatta and Nilan De Silva

- Sinhalese Sports Club won the toss and elected to bat.
- Kalana Perera (Sinhalese Sports Club) and Malindu Shehan (Burgher Recreation Club) both made their first-class debuts.

==== Round 5 ====
28 February–1 March 2020
Scorecard

Colts Cricket Club	v	Burgher Recreation Club
366 (86.1 overs); Priyamal Perera 99 (120); Duvindu Tillakaratne 8/147 (36 overs)		168 (42.1 overs); Tharindu Kaushal 38 (52); Nalin Priyadarshana 4/67 (14 overs)
17/4 (4 overs); Jehan Daniel 7 (5); Duvindu Tillakaratne 2/6 (2 overs)		214 (45.3 overs) (f/o); Bhanuka Rajapaksa 87 (49); Prabath Jayasuriya 6/65 (22.3 overs)

Colts Cricket Club won by 6 wickets
Burgher Recreation Club Ground, Colombo
Umpires: Hemantha Boteju and Kapila Kottahachchi

- Colts Cricket Club won the toss and elected to bat.

28 February–1 March 2020
Scorecard

Sinhalese Sports Club	v	Sri Lanka Army Sports Club
229 (71 overs); Shammu Ashan 77* (115); Janith Silva 4/46 (14 overs)		274 (80 overs); Himasha Liyanage 90* (166); Sachithra Senanayake 5/56 (29 overs)
226 (62.4 overs); Sammu Ashan 44 (58); Dushan Vimukthi 5/59 (22.4 overs)		125/8 (54 overs); Asela Gunaratne 26 (67); Sachithra Senanayake 4/38 (21 overs)

Match drawn
Colts Cricket Club Ground, Colombo
Umpires: Maurice Dela Zilva and Deepal Gunawardene

- Sri Lanka Army Sports Club won the toss and elected to field.
- Thilan Prashan (Sinhalese Sports Club) and Kavindu Kularathne (Sri Lanka Army Sports Club) both made their first-class debuts.

28 February–1 March 2020
Scorecard

Colombo Cricket Club	v	Moors Sports Club
547 (133.4 overs); Paven Rathnayake 164* (261); Chathura Randunu 3/188 (47 overs)		405 (106.5 overs); Ramesh Mendis 85 (110); Malinda Pushpakumara 5/139 (38 overs)
68/4 (10.5 overs); Malindu Maduranga 43 (34); Kavishka Anjula 2/20 (5 overs)

Match drawn
Colombo Cricket Club Ground, Colombo
Umpires: Susantha Dissanayake and Keerthi Bandara

- Colombo Cricket Club won the toss and elected to bat.

==== Round 6 ====
6–8 March 2020
Scorecard

Burgher Recreation Club	v	Negombo Cricket Club
328 (105.4 overs); Shanuka Dulaj 68 (126); Upul Indrasiri 7/120 (42 overs)		279 (56.1 overs); Angelo Jayasinghe 109 (119); Lasith Lakshan 4/21 (5 overs)
289 (64.2 overs); Lasith Lakshan 133 (189); Lakshitha Manasinghe 8/57 (16.2 overs)		171/3 (39 overs); Angelo Jayasinghe 53* (86); Mohamed Shiraz 1/16 (3 overs)

Match drawn
Moors Sports Club Ground, Colombo
Umpires: Kamal Indrajith and Saman Mohan de Silva

- Burgher Recreation Club won the toss and elected to bat.
- Hashan Sandeepa (Burgher Recreation Club) made his first-class debut.

6–8 March 2020
Scorecard

Colts Cricket Club	v	Colombo Cricket Club
205 (53.2 overs); Santhush Gunathilake 67 (87); Sonal Dinusha 6/55 (14.2 overs)		244 (59.2 overs); Minod Bhanuka 99 (131); Dilruwan Perera 5/95 (25 overs)
239 (65.4 overs); Vishad Randika 73 (94); Sonal Dinusha 5/100 (22 overs)		203/7 (58.1 overs); Lasith Abeyratne 45 (64); Dilruwan Perera 4/80 (26.1 overs)

Colombo Cricket Club won by 3 wickets
Colombo Cricket Club Ground, Colombo
Umpires: Chamara de Soysa and Deepal Gunawardene

- Colts Cricket Club won the toss and elected to bat.

6–8 March 2020
Scorecard

Sri Lanka Army Sports Club	v	Moors Sports Club
374 (96.3 overs); Lakshan Edirisinghe 86 (112); Dhanushka Ranasinghe 8/76 (23.3 overs)		128 (43.1 overs); Nipun Karunanayake 31 (60); Yasoda Mendis 7/18 (15.1 overs)
30/2 (6.5 overs); Ashan Randika 23 (19); Dhanushka Ranasinghe 2/21 (3.5 overs)		275 (67.1 overs) (f/o); Mohammed Shamaaz 62 (83); Asela Gunaratne 5/63 (21 overs)

Sri Lanka Army Sports Club won by 8 wickets
Army Ground, Panagoda
Umpires: Susantha Dissanayake and Sanjeewa Fernando

- Moors Sports Club won the toss and elected to field.
- Dhanushka Ranasinghe and Mohammed Shamaaz (Moors Sports Club) both made their first-class debuts.

==== Round 7 ====
13–15 March 2020
Scorecard

Sinhalese Sports Club	v	Moors Sports Club
284 (62.1 overs); Charith Asalanka 60 (98); Praveen Jayawickrama 3/47 (12.1 overs)		231 (57.3 overs); Pabasara Waduge 132 (164); Akash Senaratne 4/15 (6.3 overs)
335/9d (66 overs); Sammu Ashan 144 (141); Praveen Jayawickrama 4/89 (23 overs)		333/9 (79 overs); Sachithra Serasinghe 104 (135); Tharindu Ratnayake 3/83 (28 overs)

Match drawn
Moors Sports Club Ground, Colombo

- Sinhalese Sports Club won the toss and elected to bat.
- Imthiyas Slasa (Moors Sports Club) made his first-class debut.

13–15 March 2020
Scorecard

Sri Lanka Army Sports Club	v	Colombo Cricket Club
233 (69.2 overs); Lakshan Edirisinghe 69 (116); Malinda Pushpakumara 6/85 (30.2 overs)		410 (110.2 overs); Kavindu Nadeeshan 122 (284); Dushan Vimukthi 5/123 (41 overs)
169 (57.1 overs); Asela Gunaratne 70 (143); Lahiru Gamage 7/47 (16.1 overs)

Colombo Cricket Club won by an innings and 8 runs
Army Ground, Panagoda
Umpires: Ravindra Kottahachchi and Kapila Kottahachchi

- Sri Lanka Army Sports Club won the toss and elected to bat.
- Gihan Koralage and Iresh Chamara (Sri Lanka Army Sports Club) both made their first-class debuts.

13–15 March 2020
Scorecard

Negombo Cricket Club	v	Colts Cricket Club
294 (82.1 overs); Madawa Warnapura 73 (182); Nisala Tharaka 3/56 (14 overs)		399 (108.4 overs); Santhush Gunathilake 130 (208); Dilshan Munaweera 3/48 (14 overs)
238/8d (41.3 overs); Saad Nasim 79 (67); Dilshan Madushanka 6/33 (7.3 overs)		81/6 (28 overs); Santhush Gunathilake 37 (61); Roshen Fernando 2/11 (5 overs)

Match drawn
Colts Cricket Club Ground, Colombo
Umpires: Kamal Indrajith and Susantha Dissanayake

- Colts Cricket Club won the toss and elected to field.
- Dilshan Madushanka (Colts Cricket Club) made his first-class debut.

=== Group B ===
==== Round 1 ====
31 January–2 February 2020
Scorecard

Saracens Sports Club	v	Tamil Union Cricket and Athletic Club
296/9d (84.5 overs); Gamindu Kanishka 129* (181); Jeevan Mendis 4/85 (26.5 overs)		250 (93.2 overs); Jeevan Mendis 83 (160); Mohomed Dilshad 3/34 (13 overs)
206/7 (74.4 overs); Promod Maduwantha 54* (157); Maduka Liyanapathiranage 3/51 (31.4 overs)

Match drawn
P Sara Oval, Colombo
Umpires: Hemantha Boteju and Maurice Dela Zilva

- Tamil Union Cricket and Athletic Club won the toss and elected to field.
- Kamesh Nirmal and Dhakshitha Fernando (Tamil Union Cricket and Athletic Club) both made their first-class debuts.

1–3 February 2020
Scorecard

Nondescripts Cricket Club	v	Ragama Cricket Club
552 (107 overs); Lahiru Udara 290* (303); Amila Aponso 5/152 (37 overs)		461 (130.5 overs); Roshen Silva 139 (230); Chaturanga de Silva 6/144 (42.5 overs)
121/3 (15.5 overs); Pathum Nissanka 56* (47); Ishan Jayaratne 2/12 (3.5 overs)

Match drawn
Nondescripts Cricket Club Ground, Colombo
Umpires: Gamini Dissanayake and Pradeep Udawatta

- Ragama Cricket Club won the toss and elected to field.
- Chamika Gunasekara and Sachindu Colombage (Nondescripts Cricket Club) both made their first-class debuts.

3–5 February 2020
Scorecard

Lankan Cricket Club	v	Badureliya Sports Club
429 (127 overs); Risith Upamal 111* (161); Lahiru Samarakoon 4/107 (34 overs)		648/8d (138.4 overs); Lahiru Milantha 252 (314); Udith Madushan 2/114 (23.3 overs)

Match drawn
Surrey Village Ground, Maggona
Umpires: Kapila Kottahachchi and Deepal Gunawardene

- Badureliya Sports Club won the toss and elected to field.

==== Round 2 ====
7–9 February 2020
Scorecard

Tamil Union Cricket and Athletic Club	v	Chilaw Marians Cricket Club
162 (63.2 overs); Tharanga Paranavitana 45 (81); Asitha Fernando 5/50 (21 overs)		346 (87.1 overs); Kamindu Mendis 73 (144); Suranga Lakmal 5/79 (23.1 overs)
298 (76.2 overs); Manoj Sarathchandra 158 (160); Asitha Fernando 4/92 (25 overs)		116/1 (17 overs); Sumit Ghadigaonkar 55* (49); Maduka Liyanapathiranage 1/38 (5 overs)

Chilaw Marians Cricket Club won by 9 wickets
P Sara Oval, Colombo
Umpires: Ravindra Kottahachchi and Keerthi Bandara

- Tamil Union Cricket and Athletic Club won the toss and elected to bat.
- Sumit Ghadigaonkar (Chilaw Marians Cricket Club) made his first-class debut.

7–9 February 2020
Scorecard

Nondescripts Cricket Club	v	Lankan Cricket Club
511/9d (107.2 overs); Pathum Nissanka 129 (204); Chanaka Ruwansiri 3/57 (14.2 overs)		394 (133.2 overs); Geeth Kumara 70 (130); Chaturanga de Silva 4/82 (28 overs)
147/0 (23 overs); Mahela Udawatte 74* (66)

Match drawn
Nondescripts Cricket Club Ground, Colombo
Umpires: Kapila Kottahachchi and Nilan De Silva

- Nondescripts Cricket Club won the toss and elected to bat.

8–10 February 2020
Scorecard

Badureliya Sports Club	v	Ragama Cricket Club
505/9d (146.5 overs); Bravish Shetty 157 (256); Shiran Fernando 5/97 (26 overs)		366/9 (105 overs); Lahiru Thirimanne 187* (309); Tillakaratne Sampath 3/55 (30 overs)

Match drawn
Surrey Village Ground, Maggona
Umpires: Rohitha Kottahachchi and Asanga Jayasooriya

- Ragama Cricket Club won the toss and elected to field.

==== Round 3 ====
14–16 February 2020
Scorecard

Ragama Cricket Club	v	Saracens Sports Club
119 (53 overs); Lahiru Thirimanne 28 (78); Kasun Rajitha 8/31 (13 overs)		373 (120.1 overs); Navindu Vithanage 83 (197); Kalhara Senarathne 6/127 (37)
144 (47.2 overs); Lahiru Thirimanne 45 (109); Chamikara Edirisinghe 8/32 (17.2 overs)

Saracens Sports Club won by an innings and 110 runs
Surrey Village Ground, Maggona
Umpires: Kapila Kottahachchi and Deepal Gunawardene

- Saracens Sports Club won the toss and elected to field.

14–16 February 2020
Scorecard

Nondescripts Cricket Club	v	Chilaw Marians Cricket Club
312 (79 overs); Sahan Arachchige 128 (218); Asitha Fernando 5/46 (19 overs)		304 (88.1 overs); Shehan Jayasuriya 120 (167); Dilesh Gunaratne 5/52 (16 overs)
314/8 (78.1 overs); Mahela Udawatte 117* (153); Nimesh Vimukthi 4/86 (23.1 overs)

Match drawn
FTZ Sports Complex, Katunayake
Umpires: Hemantha Boteju and Prageeth Rambukwella

- Nondescripts Cricket Club won the toss and elected to bat.

16–18 February 2020
Scorecard

Lankan Cricket Club	v	Tamil Union Cricket and Athletic Club
271 (93.2 overs); Geeth Kumara 69 (144); Suranga Lakmal 4/50 (19 overs)		269 (92.5 overs); Tharanga Paranavitana 92 (216); Geeth Kumara 4/30 (10.5 overs)
224/4 (64 overs); Geeth Kumara 70* (148); Jeevan Mendis 2/63 (19 overs)

Match drawn
Colombo Cricket Club Ground, Colombo
Umpires: Nilan De Silva and Ruchira Palliyaguruge

- Tamil Union Cricket and Athletic Club won the toss and elected to field.

==== Round 4 ====
21–23 February 2020
Scorecard

Lankan Cricket Club	v	Saracens Sports Club
229 (73 overs); Malinga Amarasinghe 76 (85); Chamikara Edirisinghe 4/61 (20 overs)		427 (112 overs); Saliya Saman 96* (151); Geeth Kumara 3/58 (16 overs)
233/3 (70 overs); Chanaka Ruwansiri 72* (116); Promod Maduwantha 2/61 (18 overs)

Match drawn
Surrey Village Ground, Maggona
Umpires: Ravindra Kottahachchi and Asanga Jayasooriya

- Saracens Sports Club won the toss and elected to field.

21–23 February 2020
Scorecard

Chilaw Marians Cricket Club	v	Badureliya Sports Club
206 (51.5 overs); Thikshila de Silva 119* (131); Lahiru Samarakoon 5/86 (20.5 overs)		326 (91.5 overs); Lahiru Milantha 104 (176); Asitha Fernando 7/139 (29.5 overs)
185 (60 overs); Rumesh Buddika 67 (159); Lahiru Samarakoon 5/71 (22 overs)		68/3 (15.1 overs); Tillakaratne Sampath 31 (41); Thikshila de Silva 1/8 (2 overs)

Badureliya Sports Club won by 7 wickets
FTZ Sports Complex, Katunayake
Umpires: Gamini Dissanayake and Kapila Kottahachchi

- Chilaw Marians Cricket Club won the toss and elected to bat.

21–23 February 2020
Scorecard

Tamil Union Cricket and Athletic Club	v	Ragama Cricket Club
421 (101.2 overs); Manoj Sarathchandra 113 (156); Amila Aponso 3/103 (28 overs)		527 (145.2 overs); Nishan Madushka 169 (198); Pramod Madushan 3/108 (30 overs)
60/1 (11 overs); Manoj Sarathchandra 41* (36); Lahiru Thirimanne 1/13 (3 overs)

Match drawn
Nondescripts Cricket Club Ground, Colombo
Umpires: Raveendra Wimalasiri and Prageeth Rambukwella

- Tamil Union Cricket and Athletic Club won the toss and elected to bat.

==== Round 5 ====
28 February–1 March 2020
Scorecard

Badureliya Sports Club	v	Saracens Sports Club
365 (94.4 overs); Shahid Yousuf 142 (204); Gamindu Kanishka 4/54 (12.1 overs)		496/6d (153.1 overs); Promod Maduwantha 127 (300); Buddika Sanjeewa 2/100 (31 overs)

Match drawn
Surrey Village Ground, Maggona
Umpires: Kapila Kottahachchi and Pradeep Udawatta

- Saracens Sports Club won the toss and elected to field.

28 February–1 March 2020
Scorecard

Ragama Cricket Club	v	Chilaw Marians Cricket Club
204 (62.2 overs); Lahiru Thirimanne 97 (177); Nimesh Vimukthi 6/62 (25.2 overs)		268 (60.5 overs); Lasith Croospulle 99 (138); Amila Aponso 5/98 (27 overs)
352/6d (70 overs); Saminda Fernando 99 (172); Nimesh Vimukthi 2/98 (23 overs)		205 (60.2 overs); Yash Kothari 51 (91); Nishan Peiris 5/70 (23 overs)

Ragama Cricket Club won by 83 runs
Moors Sports Club Ground, Colombo
Umpires: Krishantha Rodrigo and Asanga Jayasooriya

- Chilaw Marians Cricket Club won the toss and elected to field.

28 February–1 March 2020
Scorecard

Nondescripts Cricket Club	v	Tamil Union Cricket and Athletic Club
339 (69.2 overs); Pathum Nissanka 94 (124); Pramod Madushan 4/67 (14.2 overs)		446 (124.5 overs); Manoj Sarathchandra 163* (240); Lasith Embuldeniya 3/106 (32.5 overs)
402/8 (71 overs); Pathum Nissanka 135 (172); Jeevan Mendis 2/81 (9 overs)

Match drawn
Nondescripts Cricket Club Ground, Colombo
Umpires: Ravindra Kottahachchi and Nilan De Silva

- Nondescripts Cricket Club won the toss and elected to bat.
- Harri Aravinthan (Tamil Union Cricket and Athletic Club) made his first-class debut.

==== Round 6 ====
6–8 March 2020
Scorecard

Saracens Sports Club	v	Chilaw Marians Cricket Club
176 (83 overs); Saliya Saman 35 (77); Nimesh Vimukthi 4/39 (25 overs)		281 (70.5 overs); Oshada Fernando 69 (91); Mohomed Dilshad 4/63 (14.5 overs)
123 (37.3 overs); Harsha Rajapaksha 25 (49); Chathuranga Kumara 4/52 (16 overs)		19/0 (6.4 overs); Yash Kothari 10* (27)

Chilaw Marians Cricket Club won by 10 wickets
Galle International Stadium, Galle
Umpires: Hemantha Boteju and Kapila Kottahachchi

- Saracens Sports Club won the toss and elected to bat.
- Pathum Madusanka (Saracens Sports Club) made his first-class debut.

6–8 March 2020
Scorecard

Nondescripts Cricket Club	v	Badureliya Sports Club
187/2 (55.2 overs); Pathum Nissanka 101* (156); Tillakaratne Sampath 2/69 (21 overs)

Match drawn
Surrey Village Ground, Maggona
Umpires: Ranganath Prasanna and Nilan De Silva

- Badureliya Sports Club won the toss and elected to field.
- Kasun Caldera (Nondescripts Cricket Club) made his first-class debut.
- The match was stopped after the umpires declared that the pitch was unsafe, with no further play possible.

6–8 March 2020
Scorecard

Lankan Cricket Club	v	Ragama Cricket Club
205 (77 overs); Primosh Perera 57 (122); Shashika Dulshan 5/26 (16 overs)		417/6d (99 overs); Roshen Silva 165 (247); Udith Madushan 3/103 (25 overs)
226 (72.4 overs); Chanaka Ruwansiri 43 (59); Amila Aponso 4/59 (21.4 overs)		16/0 (2.4 overs); Saminda Fernando 9* (12)

Ragama Cricket Club won by 10 wickets
Nondescripts Cricket Club Ground, Colombo
Umpires: Maurice Dela Zilva and Vidura Prasad

- Lankan Cricket Club won the toss and elected to bat.

==== Round 7 ====
14–16 March 2020
Scorecard

Nondescripts Cricket Club	v	Saracens Sports Club
421 (105.1 overs); Angelo Perera 148 (161); Saliya Saman 4/81 (28.1 overs)		150 (41.1 overs); Ashen Bandara 45 (78); Chaturanga de Silva 4/51 (15.1 overs)
		187 (45.4 overs) (f/o); Milinda Siriwardana 62 (55); Lasith Embuldeniya 9/86 (20.4 overs)

Nondescripts Cricket Club won by an innings and 84 runs
Surrey Village Ground, Maggona
Umpires: Saman Mohan de Silva and Pradeep Udawatta

- Saracens Sports Club won the toss and elected to field.

14–16 March 2020
Scorecard

Lankan Cricket Club	v	Chilaw Marians Cricket Club
126 (43.1 overs); Kasun Abeyrathne 43 (66); Sagar Udeshi 6/58 (18 overs)		432/8d (68 overs); Sumit Ghadigaonkar 149 (172); Nadeera Balasooriya 3/69 (15 overs)
156 (34.3 overs); Primosh Perera 51 (78); Sagar Udeshi 6/42 (14.3 overs)

Chilaw Marians Cricket Club won by an innings and 150 runs
Colombo Cricket Club Ground, Colombo
Umpires: Shantha Fonseka and Deepal Gunawardene

- Lankan Cricket Club won the toss and elected to bat.
- Nadeera Balasooriya and Umesh Lakshan (Lankan Cricket Club) both made their first-class debuts.

14–16 March 2020
Scorecard

Badureliya Sports Club	v	Tamil Union Cricket and Athletic Club
286 (84.5 overs); Lahiru Milantha 155* (237); Dhananjaya de Silva 6/74 (26.5 overs)		282 (70.3 overs); Dhananjaya de Silva 110 (165); Tillakaratne Sampath 5/84 (25 overs)
107 (37.4 overs); Damith Perera 39 (81); Suranga Lakmal 4/30 (12 overs)		114/3 (33.1 overs); Tharanga Paranavitana 36* (99); Buddika Sanjeewa 1/14 (5 overs)

Tamil Union Cricket and Athletic Club won by 7 wickets
Rangiri Dambulla International Stadium, Dambulla
Umpires: Ravindra Kottahachchi and Niroshana Amarasinghe

- Badureliya Sports Club won the toss and elected to bat.

== Plate League ==
10–12 August 2020
Scorecard

Lankan Cricket Club	v	Negombo Cricket Club
270 (68.2 overs); Chanaka Ruwansiri 124 (137); Lakshitha Manasinghe 5/85 (16.2 overs)		238 (69.2 overs); Madawa Warnapura 64 (112); Dunith Wellalage 3/66 (18 overs)
111 (50.3 overs); Risith Upamal 36 (77); Upul Indrasiri 5/34 (19 overs)		147/5 (36.5 overs); Roscoe Thattil 38* (64); Dunith Wellalage 3/60 (15 overs)

Negombo Cricket Club won by 5 wickets
Tyronne Fernando Stadium, Moratuwa
Umpires: Rohitha Kottahachchi and Pradeep Udawatta

- Negombo Cricket Club won the toss and elected to field.
- Methsith Jayamanna (Lankan Cricket Club) made his first-class debut.

10–12 August 2020
Scorecard

Sinhalese Sports Club	v	Tamil Union Cricket and Athletic Club
254 (77.5 overs); Sachithra Senanayake 81 (93); Suranga Lakmal 4/36 (17 overs)		349 (102.4 overs); Ranmith Jayasena 82 (170); Jeffrey Vandersay 4/91 (19 overs)
271/5 (63 overs); Charith Asalanka 94 (160); Maduka Liyanapathiranage 2/51 (18 overs)

Match drawn
Nondescripts Cricket Club Ground, Colombo
Umpires: Ranmore Martinesz and Nilan De Silva

- Tamil Union Cricket and Athletic Club won the toss and elected to field.

10–12 August 2020
Scorecard

Moors Sports Club	v	Badureliya Sports Club
340 (100.2 overs); Ayana Siriwardhana 83 (94); Lahiru Samarakoon 5/86 (26.2 overs)		149 (45.5 overs); Salinda Ushan 67 (139); Kavishka Anjula 5/39 (10.5 overs)
305/6d (69.1 overs); Sachithra Serasinghe 60 (92); Lahiru Samarakoon 2/33 (11 overs)		120/9 (40 overs); Dushan Hemantha 43 (41); Kavishka Anjula 6/35 (11 overs)

Match drawn
Colts Cricket Club Ground, Colombo
Umpires: Sisira Kumara and Gamini Dissanayake

- Badureliya Sports Club won the toss and elected to field.
- Dunith Jayatunga (Badureliya Sports Club) made his first-class debut.

16–18 August 2020
Scorecard

Badureliya Sports Club	v	Negombo Cricket Club
267 (84.5 overs); Dunith Jayatunga 57 (129); Upul Indrasiri 5/65 (30 overs)		381 (105.2 overs); Dilshan Munaweera 91 (144); Dushan Hemantha 4/82 (21.2 overs)
276 (69.1 overs); Dushan Hemantha 115 (112); Upul Indrasiri 5/85 (25 overs)

Match drawn
Nondescripts Cricket Club Ground, Colombo
Umpires: Ravindra Kottahachchi and Vidura Prasad

- Badureliya Sports Club won the toss and elected to bat.

16–18 August 2020
Scorecard

Sinhalese Sports Club	v	Lankan Cricket Club
332 (76.2 overs); Dasun Shanaka 112 (144); Chanaka Ruwansiri 3/53 (14 overs)		375 (119.4 overs); Chanaka Ruwansiri 165 (201); Jeffrey Vandersay 5/117 (26.4 overs)
226/4 (48 overs); Sandun Weerakkody 67 (55); Geeth Kumara 3/49 (14 overs)

Match drawn
Colts Cricket Club Ground, Colombo
Umpires: Maurice Dela Zilva and Pradeep Udawatta

- Lankan Cricket Club won the toss and elected to field.
- Kevin Perera (Lankan Cricket Club) made his first-class debut.

16–18 August 2020
Scorecard

Moors Sports Club	v	Tamil Union Cricket and Athletic Club
206 (71.2 overs); Nipun Karunanayake 44 (100); Dhananjaya de Silva 7/59 (21.2 overs)		178 (52 overs); Dhananjaya de Silva 95* (104); Praveen Jayawickrama 5/53 (19 overs)
171 (46.1 overs); Pabasara Waduge 44 (43); Dhananjaya de Silva 5/50 (15.1 overs)		155 (36.3 overs); Suranga Lakmal 40 (20); Praveen Jayawickrama 6/91 (17.3 overs)

Moors Sports Club won by 44 runs
Tyronne Fernando Stadium, Moratuwa
Umpires: Hemantha Boteju and Susantha Dissanayake

- Moors Sports Club won the toss and elected to bat.

22–24 August 2020
Scorecard

Tamil Union Cricket and Athletic Club	v	Negombo Cricket Club
184 (49.1 overs); Devind Pathmanathan 40 (48); Roshen Fernando 5/31 (13 overs)		371 (105 overs); Ashen Silva 90 (186); Maduka Liyanapathiranage 6/54 (26 overs)
387/9d (96 overs); Yohan Mendis 116 (211); Lakshitha Manasinghe 5/135 (27 overs)

Match drawn
Colts Cricket Club Ground, Colombo
Umpires: Gamini Dissanayake and Kapila Kottahachchi

- Negombo Cricket Club won the toss and elected to field.
- Danushka Sandaruwan (Negombo Cricket Club) made his first-class debut.

22–24 August 2020
Scorecard

Sinhalese Sports Club	v	Badureliya Sports Club
583 (115.1 overs); Dasun Shanaka 128 (167); Alankara Asanka Silva 3/97 (28.1 overs)		280 (78.5 overs); Damith Perera 113 (145); Tharindu Ratnayake 4/73 (21 overs)
		258/4 (64 overs) (f/o); Damith Perera 112* (174); Tharindu Ratnayake 3/72 (18 overs)

Match drawn
Tyronne Fernando Stadium, Moratuwa
Umpires: Maurice Dela Zilva and Rohitha Kottahachchi

- Sinhalese Sports Club won the toss and elected to bat.
- Kosala Ravindu (Badureliya Sports Club) made his first-class debut.

22–24 August 2020
Scorecard

Moors Sports Club	v	Lankan Cricket Club
599/9d (122.4 overs); Sachithra Serasinghe 151 (194); Dunith Wellalage 4/143 (25.4 overs)		320 (82 overs); Malinga Amarasinghe 117 (156); Praveen Jayawickrama 5/83 (24 overs)
		176 (55.3 overs) (f/o); Risith Upamal 36 (51); Ayana Siriwardhana 2/7 (5 overs)

Moors Sports Club won by an innings and 103 runs
Nondescripts Cricket Club Ground, Colombo
Umpires: Susantha Dissanayake and Nilan De Silva

- Moors Sports Club won the toss and elected to bat.
- Arul Prakash (Moors Sports Club) made his first-class debut.

== Super Eight ==
10–12 August 2020
Scorecard

Colombo Cricket Club	v	Ragama Cricket Club
499/7d (117 overs); Kusal Mendis 139 (225); Binura Fernando 4/72 (21 overs)		132 (41.2 overs); Janith Liyanage 43* (62); Malinda Pushpakumara 4/35 (14.2 overs)
		242 (58.3 overs) (f/o); Janith Liyanage 50* (64); Malinda Pushpakumara 4/55 (17.3 overs)

Colombo Cricket Club won by an innings and 125 runs
Chilaw Marians Cricket Club Ground, Katunayake
Umpires: Deepal Gunawardene and Prageeth Rambukwella

- Ragama Cricket Club won the toss and elected to field.

10–12 August 2020
Scorecard

Colts Cricket Club	v	Saracens Sports Club
408/6d (128.2 overs); Angelo Mathews 173* (262); Kasun Rajitha 3/85 (25 overs)		182 (81.2 overs); Gamindu Kanishka 45 (73); Nisala Tharaka 3/34 (14 overs)
		106/3 (40 overs) (f/o); Navindu Vithanage 34 (115); Akila Dananjaya 2/19 (6 overs)

Match drawn
P Sara Oval, Colombo
Umpires: Ravindra Kottahachchi and Lyndon Hannibal

- Saracens Sports Club won the toss and elected to field.

10–12 August 2020
Scorecard

Sri Lanka Army Sports Club	v	Nondescripts Cricket Club
269 (84.1 overs); Janith Silva 54 (112); Dilesh Gunaratne 5/42 (18.1 overs)		417/7d (88 overs); Upul Tharanga 121 (166); Seekkuge Prasanna 3/91 (20 overs)
255/3 (60 overs); Dinesh Chandimal 129 (154); Dilesh Gunaratne 2/13 (6 overs)

Match drawn
Sinhalese Sports Club Ground, Colombo
Umpires: Hemantha Boteju and Raveendra Wimalasiri

- Nondescripts Cricket Club won the toss and elected to field.
- Chathuranga Silva (Sri Lanka Army Sports Club) made his first-class debut.

10–12 August 2020
Scorecard

Chilaw Marians Cricket Club	v	Burgher Recreation Club
195 (47.2 overs); Oshada Fernando 42 (54); Bhanuka Rajapaksa 3/26 (10 overs)		87 (34.2 overs); Deshan Dias 24 (38); Asitha Fernando 4/42 (14 overs)
385/8d (89.2 overs); Kamindu Mendis 150* (243); Bhanuka Rajapaksa 3/60 (18.2 overs)		231/8 (80 overs); Dilshan de Soysa 105* (157); Kamindu Mendis 4/43 (13 overs)

Match drawn
Colombo Cricket Club Ground, Colombo
Umpires: Kumar Dharmasena and Asanga Jayasooriya

- Burgher Recreation Club won the toss and elected to field.

15–17 August 2020
Scorecard

Colombo Cricket Club	v	Saracens Sports Club
142 (40.4 overs); Minod Bhanuka 92 (122); Kasun Rajitha 5/63 (14 overs)		183 (49.3 overs); Milinda Siriwardana 89 (88); Lahiru Gamage 5/29 (11 overs)
351/7d (81 overs); Lasith Abeyratne 101* (170); Kasun Rajitha 4/104 (21 overs)		283/6 (81 overs); Milinda Siriwardana 151 (180); Vishwa Fernando 3/38 (13 overs)

Match drawn
Sinhalese Sports Club Ground, Colombo
Umpires: Ranmore Martinesz and Gamini Dissanayake

- Saracens Sports Club won the toss and elected to field.

15–17 August 2020
Scorecard

Ragama Cricket Club	v	Colts Cricket Club
258 (63 overs); Saminda Fernando 73 (93); Akila Dananjaya 4/24 (7 overs)		163 (57.3 overs); Santhush Gunathilake 33 (80); Shashika Dulshan 6/45 (13.3 overs)
220 (65.2 overs); Roshen Silva 67 (111); Prabath Jayasuriya 5/69 (23.2 overs)		212 (55.5 overs); Sadeera Samarawickrama 69 (128); Kalhara Senarathne 3/28 (5.5 overs)

Ragama Cricket Club won by 103 runs
Colombo Cricket Club Ground, Colombo
Umpires: Rohitha Kottahachchi and Asanga Jayasooriya

- Ragama Cricket Club won the toss and elected to bat.

15–17 August 2020
Scorecard

Chilaw Marians Cricket Club	v	Sri Lanka Army Sports Club
269 (82.3 overs); Shehan Jayasuriya 95 (147); Asela Gunaratne 3/37 (16 overs)		216 (70 overs); Dinesh Chandimal 62 (99); Asitha Fernando 4/71 (22 overs)
241 (63 overs); Kasun Vidura 73* (106); Seekkuge Prasanna 6/101 (24 overs)		249 (36.3 overs); Ashan Randika 133 (84); Nimesh Vimukthi 4/23 (5.3 overs)

Chilaw Marians Cricket Club won by 45 runs
P Sara Oval, Colombo
Umpires: Deepal Gunawardene and Nilan De Silva

- Chilaw Marians Cricket Club won the toss and elected to bat.

15–17 August 2020
Scorecard

Burgher Recreation Club	v	Nondescripts Cricket Club
316 (86.3 overs); Bhanuka Rajapaksa 115 (82); Ashian Daniel 4/98 (32.3 overs)		275 (65.2 overs); Chamika Karunaratne 93 (97); Duvindu Tillakaratne 6/63 (22 overs)
240 (58.5 overs); Bhanuka Rajapaksa 110* (98); Lahiru Kumara 4/76 (15.5 overs)		227/9 (44 overs); Lahiru Udara 93 (64); Duvindu Tillakaratne 7/55 (18 overs)

Match drawn
Chilaw Marians Cricket Club Ground, Katunayake
Umpires: Keerthi Bandara and Ruchira Palliyaguruge

- Nondescripts Cricket Club won the toss and elected to field.
- Ashian Daniel (Nondescripts Cricket Club) made his first-class debut.

20–22 August 2020
Scorecard

Nondescripts Cricket Club	v	Colombo Cricket Club
467 (125.3 overs); Chaturanga de Silva 159 (229); Malinda Pushpakumara 6/80 (25.3 overs)		480/6 (123 overs); Kusal Mendis 200* (300); Dushmantha Chameera 2/81 (21 overs)

Match drawn
P Sara Oval, Colombo
Umpires: Kumar Dharmasena and Pradeep Udawatta

- Nondescripts Cricket Club won the toss and elected to bat.

20–22 August 2020
Scorecard

Colts Cricket Club	v	Chilaw Marians Cricket Club
302 (72 overs); Santhush Gunathilake 74 (114); Asitha Fernando 5/87 (21 overs)		399/9d (101 overs); Rumesh Buddika 145 (185); Dilruwan Perera 3/84 (30 overs)
227/5 (75 overs); Santhush Gunathilake 82 (174); Nimesh Vimukthi 2/59 (28 overs)

Match drawn
Sinhalese Sports Club Ground, Colombo
Umpires: Ranmore Martinesz and Raveendra Wimalasiri

- Chilaw Marians Cricket Club won the toss and elected to field.

20–22 August 2020
Scorecard

Ragama Cricket Club	v	Sri Lanka Army Sports Club
501/9d (144.3 overs); Janith Liyanage 107* (227); Yasoda Mendis 3/74 (30 overs)		189 (59.1 overs); Heshan Hettiarchchi 54 (50); Shashika Dulshan 4/44 (14 overs)
126/8d (30.2 overs); Saminda Fernando 32 (35); Dushan Vimukthi 5/38 (14.2 overs)		66/2 (16 overs); Asela Gunaratne 22* (23); Amila Aponso 1/12 (4 overs)

Match drawn
Colombo Cricket Club Ground, Colombo
Umpires: Lyndon Hannibal and Prageeth Rambukwella

- Ragama Cricket Club won the toss and elected to bat.

20–22 August 2020
Scorecard

Burgher Recreation Club	v	Saracens Sports Club
392 (110.1 overs); Raminda Wijesooriya 109 (163); Ranitha Liyanarachchi 4/66 (15.1 overs)		262 (88 overs); Promod Maduwantha 47 (132); Mohamed Shiraz 4/74 (21 overs)
124 (27.1 overs); Hashen Ramanayake 35 (35); Mohomed Dilshad 7/42 (12 overs)		75/3 (21 overs); Ashen Bandara 36 (44); Bhanuka Rajapaksa 1/11 (3 overs)

Match drawn
Chilaw Marians Cricket Club Ground, Katunayake
Umpires: Hemantha Boteju and Ruchira Palliyaguruge

- Saracens Sports Club won the toss and elected to field.

25–27 August 2020
Scorecard

Colombo Cricket Club	v	Chilaw Marians Cricket Club
287 (59.5 overs); Lasith Abeyratne 68 (92); Nimesh Vimukthi 5/59 (18 overs)		458/9d (87 overs); Shehan Jayasuriya 108 (95); Malinda Pushpakumara 4/106 (23 overs)
494/8d (97 overs); Ashan Priyanjan 170 (172); Thikshila de Silva 2/44 (9 overs)		52/2 (9 overs); Lasith Croospulle 42 (30); Lasith Abeyratne 2/23 (5 overs)

Match drawn
Sinhalese Sports Club Ground, Colombo
Umpires: Asanga Jayasooriya and Lyndon Hannibal

- Colombo Cricket Club won the toss and elected to bat.

25–27 August 2020
Scorecard

Nondescripts Cricket Club	v	Colts Cricket Club
458 (88.2 overs); Angelo Perera 107 (111); Prabath Jayasuriya 4/117 (18.2 overs)		222 (51 overs); Angelo Mathews 52 (69); Chaturanga de Silva 5/56 (17 overs)
		157 (48.2 overs) (f/o); Angelo Mathews 30* (34); Chaturanga de Silva 4/81 (21.2 overs)

Nondescripts won by an innings and 79 runs
Colombo Cricket Club Ground, Colombo
Umpires: Ravindra Kottahachchi and Ruchira Palliyaguruge

- Nondescripts Cricket Club won the toss and elected to bat.
- Dilruwan Perera (Colts Cricket Club) took his 800th first-class wicket.

25–27 August 2020
Scorecard

Sri Lanka Army Sports Club	v	Saracens Sports Club
642/8d (156.2 overs); Dinesh Chandimal 354* (391); Mohomed Dilshad 2/86 (23 overs)		259 (69.5 overs); Gamindu Kanishka 95 (137); Seekkuge Prasanna 5/72 (23.5 overs)
		76/5 (35 overs) (f/o); Sithara Gimhan 31 (51); Seekkuge Prasanna 3/29 (16 overs)

Match drawn
Chilaw Marians Cricket Club Ground, Katunayake
Umpires: Prageeth Rambukwella and Keerthi Bandara

- Sri Lanka Army Sports Club won the toss and elected to bat.
- Praveen Sandamal (Saracens Sports Club) and Shihan de Silva (Sri Lanka Army Sports Club) both made their first-class debuts.
- Dinesh Chandimal (Sri Lanka Army Sports Club) scored his maiden triple century in first-class cricket.

25–27 August 2020
Scorecard

Ragama Cricket Club	v	Burgher Recreation Club
491 (134.1 overs); Udara Jayasundera 158 (298); Hashen Ramanayake 3/80 (25 overs)		406 (110.4 overs); Shanuka Dulaj 143 (173); Shashika Dulshan 4/127 (31 overs)
23/0 (5 overs); Lahiru Thirimanne 12* (17)

Match drawn
P Sara Oval, Colombo
Umpires: Raveendra Wimalasiri and Deepal Gunawardene

- Ragama Cricket Club won the toss and elected to bat.

== See also ==
- 2019–20 Premier League Tournament Tier B
