= Dinuka =

Dinuka is a given name. Notable people with the name include:

- Dinuka Dilshan (born 2000), Sri Lankan cricketer
- Dinuka Hettiarachchi (born 1976), Sri Lankan cricketer
- Dinuka Karunaratne (born 1987), Sri Lankan badminton player
