= Santhush =

Santhush is a given name. Notable people with the name include:

- Santhush Gunathilake (born 1999), Sri Lankan cricketer
- Santhush Weeraman (born 1977), member of Sri Lankan pop duo Bathiya and Santhush
