= Kavindu Kularathne =

Sri Lankan cricketer (born 1997)

Personal information
- Born: 28 October 1997 (age 29)
- Source: Cricinfo, 1 March 2020

Kavindu Kularathne (born 28 October 1997) is a Sri Lankan cricketer. He made his first-class debut on 28 February 2020, for Sri Lanka Army Sports Club in the 2019–20 Premier League Tournament.
