= 2021 SLC Invitational T20 League =

Cricket tournament

- Dates: 12 – 24 August 2021
- Administrator: Sri Lanka Cricket
- Cricket format: Twenty20
- Tournament format: Round-robin then knockout
- Host: Sri Lanka
- Champions: SLC Greys (1st title)
- Participants: 4
- Matches: 13
- Player of the series: Dasun Shanaka
- Most runs: Dasun Shanaka (258)
- Most wickets: Himesh Ramanayake (7); Nuwan Pradeep (7); Pulina Tharanga (7); Seekkuge Prasanna (7)

The 2021 SLC Invitational T20 League or Dialog Invitational T20 League (for sponsors) was a Twenty20 cricket tournament that took place in Sri Lanka from 12 to 24 August 2021. All the matches were played at the Pallekele International Cricket Stadium, in Kandy, and were used as preparation for South Africa's tour of Sri Lanka and the 2021 ICC Men's T20 World Cup. Four teams took part, with the top two sides playing each other in the final.

Both of the matches scheduled to take place on the opening day of the tournament were rescheduled to the following day due to rain. Following a COVID-19 case in the team hotel, the matches scheduled for 20 August 2021 were moved back by one day. In the final group match, SLC Reds beat SLC Greens by six wickets to join SLC Greys in the final of the tournament. In the final, SLC Greys beat SLC Reds by 42 runs to win the tournament. Minod Bhanuka was named the player of the match in the final and Dasun Shanaka was named the player of the series.

== Squads ==
The following teams and squads were named for the tournament. Prior to the first match, several changes to the squads were made. Himasha Liyanage and Kamil Mishara both moved to SLC Greys, and Prabath Jayasuriya moved to SLC Reds. Sandun Weerakkody, Jehan Daniel, Sangeeth Cooray, Koshan Dhanushka, Lahiru Gamage, Ashan Randika and Lasith Embuldeniya all failed a fitness test. Finally, Sachindu Colombage, Nimesh Vimukthi and Mohamed Shiraz all tested positive for COVID-19 and were ruled out of the tournament.

SLC Blues	SLC Greens	SLC Reds	SLC Greys
Dhananjaya de Silva (c); Angelo Perera (vc); Sadeera Samarawickrama; Nishan Madushka; ~~Ashan Randika~~; Pavan Rathnayake; Ashen Bandara; Sahan Arachchige; Lahiru Samarakoon; Dhananjaya Lakshan; Suranga Lakmal; Kalana Perera; Dilshan Madushanka; Shiran Fernando; Praveen Jayawickrama; Maheesh Theekshana; ~~Sachindu Colombage~~	Ashan Priyanjan (c); Kamindu Mendis (vc); Lahiru Udara; Mahela Udawatte; Krishan Sanjula; Pathum Nissanka; Saminda Fernando; Shammu Ashan; Ramesh Mendis; Suminda Lakshan; Ishan Jayaratne; Lahiru Kumara; Vishwa Fernando; Nuwan Thushara; ~~Lahiru Gamage~~; ~~Lasith Embuldeniya~~; Lakshan Sandakan	Dinesh Chandimal (c); Avishka Fernando (vc); Nipun Dananjaya; ~~Sandun Weerakkody~~; Oshada Fernando; Muditha Lakshan; Asela Gunaratne; Lasith Abeyratne; Seekkuge Prasanna; Chamika Karunaratne; ~~Jehan Daniel~~; Santhush Gunathilake; Binura Fernando; ~~Mohamed Shiraz~~; Asitha Fernando; Himesh Ramanayake; ~~Nimesh Vimukthi~~; Akila Dananjaya; Prabath Jayasuriya	Dasun Shanaka (c); Charith Asalanka (vc); Minod Bhanuka; Lasith Croospulle; ~~Sangeeth Cooray~~; Bhanuka Rajapaksa; Nuwanidu Fernando; Chaturanga de Silva; Lahiru Madushanka; Milinda Siriwardana; ~~Koshan Dhanushka~~; Udith Madushan; Nuwan Pradeep; Chamika Gunasekara; Matheesha Pathirana; Pulina Tharanga; Ashian Daniel; Himasha Liyanage; Kamil Mishara

== Fixtures ==
=== Round-robin ===
12–13 August 2021
14:30
Scorecard

SLC Greys; 167/7 (20 overs)	v	SLC Greens; 166/6 (20 overs)
Dasun Shanaka 84 (41); Ashan Priyanjan 1/18 (2 overs)		Kamindu Mendis 74 (48); Pulina Tharanga 3/22 (4 overs)

SLC Greys won by 1 run
Pallekele International Cricket Stadium, Kandy
Umpires: Asanga Jayasooriya and Keerthi Bandara

- SLC Greys won the toss and elected to bat.
- No play was possible on the first day due to rain, with the match rescheduled for the following day.

12–13 August 2021
19:00 (N)
Scorecard

SLC Blues; 148/8 (20 overs)	v	SLC Reds; 92 (17 overs)
Ashen Bandara 45* (25); Akila Dananjaya 3/27 (4 overs)		Nipun Dananjaya 14 (14); Angelo Perera 2/6 (2 overs)

SLC Blues won by 56 runs
Pallekele International Cricket Stadium, Kandy
Umpires: Deepal Gunawardene and Rohitha Kottahachchi

- SLC Blues won the toss and elected to bat.
- No play was possible on the first day due to rain, with the match rescheduled for the following day.

14 August 2021
14:30
Scorecard

SLC Greys; 154/8 (20 overs)	v	SLC Reds; 119/9 (20 overs)
Dasun Shanaka 48 (38); Seekkuge Prasanna 2/9 (4 overs)		Oshada Fernando 52 (49); Ashian Daniel 2/18 (4 overs)

SLC Greys won by 35 runs
Pallekele International Cricket Stadium, Kandy
Umpires: Deepal Gunawardene and Hemantha Boteju

- SLC Greys won the toss and elected to bat.

14 August 2021
19:00 (N)
Scorecard

SLC Greens; 180/2 (20 overs)	v	SLC Blues; 181/5 (19.3 overs)
Pathum Nissanka 76* (54); Maheesh Theekshana 2/12 (4 overs)		Sadeera Samarawickrama 47 (38); Ishan Jayaratne 1/16 (3 overs)

SLC Blues won by 5 wickets
Pallekele International Cricket Stadium, Kandy
Umpires: Keerthi Bandara and Ravindra Kottahachchi

- SLC Greens won the toss and elected to bat.

16 August 2021
14:30
Scorecard

SLC Greens; 143/7 (20 overs)	v	SLC Reds; 144/0 (17.3 overs)
Kamindu Mendis 66 (42); Chamika Karunaratne 3/26 (4 overs)		Avishka Fernando 82* (58)

SLC Reds won by 10 wickets
Pallekele International Cricket Stadium, Kandy
Umpires: Asanga Jayasooriya and Rohitha Kottahachchi

- SLC Greens won the toss and elected to bat.

16 August 2021
19:00 (N)
Scorecard

SLC Greys; 167/4 (20 overs)	v	SLC Blues; 151/7 (20 overs)
Lahiru Madushanka 74* (39); Dilshan Madushanka 1/16 (2 overs)		Sadeera Samarawickrama 58 (42); Nuwan Pradeep 2/22 (4 overs)

SLC Greys won by 16 runs
Pallekele International Cricket Stadium, Kandy
Umpires: Hemantha Boteju and Ravindra Kottahachchi

- SLC Greys won the toss and elected to bat.

18 August 2021
14:30
Scorecard

SLC Blues; 146/7 (20 overs)	v	SLC Reds; 148/4 (19 overs)
Dhananjaya Lakshan 55 (47); Himesh Ramanayake 4/31 (4 overs)		Dinesh Chandimal 59 (44); Dilshan Madushanka 1/14 (2 overs)

SLC Reds won by 6 wickets
Pallekele International Cricket Stadium, Kandy
Umpires: Keerthi Bandara and Rohitha Kottahachchi

- SLC Reds won the toss and elected to field.

18 August 2021
19:00 (N)
Scorecard

SLC Greys; 137/3 (10 overs)	v	SLC Greens; 69/3 (5.3 overs)
Dasun Shanaka 55* (22); Vishwa Fernando 2/25 (2 overs)		Lahiru Udara 33 (10); Chaturanga de Silva 2/21 (2 overs)

SLC Greys won by 4 runs (DLS method)
Pallekele International Cricket Stadium, Kandy
Umpires: Asanga Jayasooriya and Deepal Gunawardene

- SLC Greens won the toss and elected to field.
- SLC Greens were set a revised target of 74 runs from 5.3 overs due to rain.

21 August 2021
14:30
Scorecard

SLC Blues; 48/1 (7 overs)	v	SLC Greens
Dhananjaya Lakshan 31 (28); Ramesh Mendis 1/8 (2 overs)

No result
Pallekele International Cricket Stadium, Kandy
Umpires: Hemantha Boteju and Keerthi Bandara

- SLC Greens won the toss and elected to field.
- Rain prevented any further play.

21 August 2021
19:00 (N)
Scorecard

SLC Greys	v	SLC Reds

Match abandoned
Pallekele International Cricket Stadium, Kandy
Umpires: Deepal Gunawardene and Ravindra Kottahachchi

- No toss.
- No play was possible due to rain.

22 August 2021
14:30
Scorecard

SLC Greys; 156/4 (20 overs)	v	SLC Blues; 33/1 (3.5 overs)
Charith Asalanka 57 (44); Kalana Perera 2/29 (4 overs)		Sadeera Samarawickrama 20* (13)

No result
Pallekele International Cricket Stadium, Kandy
Umpires: Hemantha Boteju and Rohitha Kottahachchi

- SLC Blues won the toss and elected to field.
- Rain prevented any further play.
- Matheesha Pathirana (SLC Greys) made his T20 debut.

22 August 2021
19:00 (N)
Scorecard

SLC Greens; 114/7 (15 overs)	v	SLC Reds; 118/4 (14.3 overs)
Saminda Fernando 37 (36); Himesh Ramanayake 1/13 (2 overs)		Dinesh Chandimal 40 (32); Lakshan Sandakan 2/14 (3 overs)

SLC Reds won by 6 wickets
Pallekele International Cricket Stadium, Kandy
Umpires: Asanga Jayasooriya and Ravindra Kottahachchi

- SLC Reds won the toss and elected to field.
- The match was reduced to 15 overs per side due to rain.

=== Final ===
24 August 2021
19:00 (N)
Scorecard

SLC Greys; 201/4 (20 overs)	v	SLC Reds; 159 (19.4 overs)
Minod Bhanuka 74 (51); Akila Dananjaya 2/24 (4 overs)		Oshada Fernando 46 (27); Nuwan Pradeep 2/17 (3.4 overs)

SLC Greys won by 42 runs
Pallekele International Cricket Stadium, Kandy
Umpires: Asanga Jayasooriya and Deepal Gunawardene
Player of the match: Minod Bhanuka (SLC Greys)

- SLC Greys won the toss and elected to bat.
