= Gihan Koralage =

Sri Lankan cricketer (born 1997)

Personal information
- Born: 3 July 1997 (age 29)
- Source: Cricinfo, 4 January 2020

Gihan Koralage (born 3 July 1997) is a Sri Lankan cricketer. He made his List A debut on 28 December 2019, for Sri Lanka Army Sports Club in the 2019–20 Invitation Limited Over Tournament in Sri Lanka. He made his Twenty20 debut on 4 January 2020, for Sri Lanka Army Sports Club in the 2019–20 SLC Twenty20 Tournament. He made his first-class debut on 13 March 2020, for Sri Lanka Army Sports Club in the 2019–20 Premier League Tournament.
