= Hansa de Silva =

Sri Lankan cricketer (born 1997)

Personal information
- Full name: Hansa Pramod de Silva
- Born: 12 October 1997 (age 29)
- Source: Cricinfo, 6 January 2020

Hansa Pramod de Silva (born 29 October 1997) is a Sri Lankan cricketer. He made his Twenty20 debut on 6 January 2020, for Sri Lanka Army Sports Club in the 2019–20 SLC Twenty20 Tournament. He made his first-class debut on 31 January 2020, for Sri Lanka Army Sports Club in the 2019–20 Premier League Tournament.
