= Sandeepa =

Sandeepa is a given name and surname. Notable people with the name include:

- Sandeepa Dhar (born 1989), Indian actress
- Hashan Sandeepa (born 1998), Sri Lankan cricketer
