= Pathum Dilshan =

Sri Lankan cricketer (born 1991)

Personal information
- Born: 20 June 1991 (age 35)
- Source: Cricinfo, 16 February 2020

Pathum Dilshan (born 20 June 1991) is a Sri Lankan cricketer. He made his first-class debut on 14 February 2020, for Sri Lanka Army Sports Club in the 2019–20 Premier League Tournament.
