= Shihan de Silva =

Sri Lankan cricketer (born 1998)

Personal information
- Born: 12 June 1998 (age 28)
- Source: Cricinfo, 14 December 2019

Nallahandi Shihan Hansaka de Silva Wijeratne (born 12 June 1998), known as Shihan de Silva, is a Sri Lankan cricketer. He made his List A debut on 14 December 2019, for Sri Lanka Army Sports Club in the 2019–20 Invitation Limited Over Tournament. He made his Twenty20 debut on 12 January 2020, for Sri Lanka Army Sports Club in the 2019–20 SLC Twenty20 Tournament. He made his first-class debut for Sri Lanka Army Sports Club in the 2019–20 Premier League Tournament on 25 August 2020.
