= Iresh =

Iresh (Bengali: ইরেশ) is an Asian masculine given name that may refer to the following notable people:

- Iresh Chamara (born 1994), Sri Lankan cricketer
- Iresh Saxena (born 1984), Indian cricketer
- Iresh Zaker (born 1976), Bangladeshi advertising executive, television and film actor and a musician
