= Vijayakanth Viyaskanth =

Sri Lankan cricketer (born 2001)

Personal information
- Born: 5 December 2001 (age 24); Jaffna, Sri Lanka
- Batting: Right-handed
- Bowling: Right arm leg break
- Role: Bowler

International information
- National side: Sri Lanka (2023–present)
- T20I debut (cap 107): 4 October 2023 v Afghanistan
- Last T20I: 22 November 2025 v Pakistan
- T20I shirt no.: 55

Domestic team information
- Years: Team
- 2020–2024: Jaffna Kings (squad no. 26)
- 2023: Chattogram Challengers
- 2023: MI Emirates
- 2024: Sunrisers Hyderabad
- 2025: Abu Dhabi Knight Riders
- 2026: Galle Gallants

Career statistics
Competition	T20I	FC	LA	T20
Matches	2	14	16	60
Runs scored	13	248	92	153
Batting average	–	14.58	10.22	11.76
100s/50s	0/0	0/1	0/0	0/0
Top score	13*	59	34	25*
Balls bowled	48	1,397	816	1,198
Wickets	1	39	28	67
Bowling average	56.00	19.76	22.28	21.40
5 wickets in innings	0	1	0	0
10 wickets in match	–	0	–	–
Best bowling	1/28	5/81	4/21	4/22
Catches/stumpings	0/–	4/–	6/–	17/–
Medal record
Men's cricket
Representing Sri Lanka
Asian Games
Bronze medal – third place	2026 Aichi–Nagoya	Team
- Source: Cricinfo, 25 December 2025

Vijayakanth Viyaskanth (Tamil: விஜயகாந்த் வியாஸ்காந்த்; born 5 December 2001) is a Sri Lankan cricketer. He is a right-handed batsman and a right-arm leg break bowler. He is a talented leg spinner, who plays for the Galle Gallants in the Lanka Premier League. He has also played for Sunrisers Hyderabad in the Indian Premier League and Jaffna Kings in Lanka Premier League.

== Domestic career ==
He made his Twenty20 debut on 4 December 2020, for the Jaffna Stallions in the 2020 Lanka Premier League. In November 2021, he was selected to play for the Jaffna Kings following the players' draft for the 2021 Lanka Premier League.

He made his List A debut on 30 January 2022, for the Team Jaffna in the 2021–22 SLC National Super League. In July 2022, he was signed by the Jaffna Kings for the third edition of the Lanka Premier League. He was one of the leading wicket takers in the tournament, taking 13 wickets.

In December 2022, he was picked by the Chattogram Challengers for the 2022–23 Bangladesh Premier League. He made his first-class debut for Tamil Union Cricket and Athletic Club on 22 September 2023, against Nondescripts in the 2023–24 Major League Tournament.

Before his first-class debut, in August 2023, he was picked by MI Emirates to play for them in the 2024 International League T20. He picked up 8 wickets in the tournament and was the most economical bowler for his team, going at 5.43 runs per over. In April 2024, he was signed by Sunrisers Hyderabad as a replacement for Wanindu Hasaranga, to play for them in the 2024 Indian Premier League.

== International career ==
In September 2023, he was named in Sri Lanka's squad for the 2023 Asian Games. He made his Twenty20 International (T20I) debut for Sri Lanka on 4 October 2023, against Afghanistan. He played in the IPL for the first time as a bowler for Sunrisers Hyderabad in 2024.

In May 2024, he was named as a reserve player in Sri Lanka's squad for the 2024 ICC Men's T20 World Cup tournament.
