= Kosala Ravindu =

Sri Lankan cricketer (born 2000)

Personal information
- Born: 2 July 2000 (age 26)
- Batting: Right-handed
- Bowling: Right-arm offbreak
- Source: Cricinfo, 4 January 2020

Kosala Ravindu (born 2 July 2000) is a Sri Lankan cricketer. He made his Twenty20 debut on 4 January 2020, for Badureliya Sports Club in the 2019–20 SLC Twenty20 Tournament. He made his first-class debut for Badureliya Sports Club in the 2019–20 Premier League Tournament on 22 August 2020. He made his List A debut on 26 March 2021, for Panadura Sports Club in the 2020–21 Major Clubs Limited Over Tournament.
