= Heshan Dhanushka =

Sri Lankan cricketer (born 1998)

Personal information
- Born: 30 May 1998 (age 28)
- Source: Cricinfo, 4 March 2021

Heshan Dhanushka (born 30 May 1998) is a Sri Lankan cricketer. He made his List As debut on 14 December 2019, for Colts Cricket Club in the 2019–20 Invitation Limited Over Tournament. He made his first-class debut on 14 February 2020, for Colts Cricket Club in the 2019–20 Premier League Tournament. He made his Twenty20 debut on 4 March 2021, for Colts Cricket Club in the 2020–21 SLC Twenty20 Tournament.
