= Dinesh Chandimal =

Sri Lankan Cricketer (born 1989)

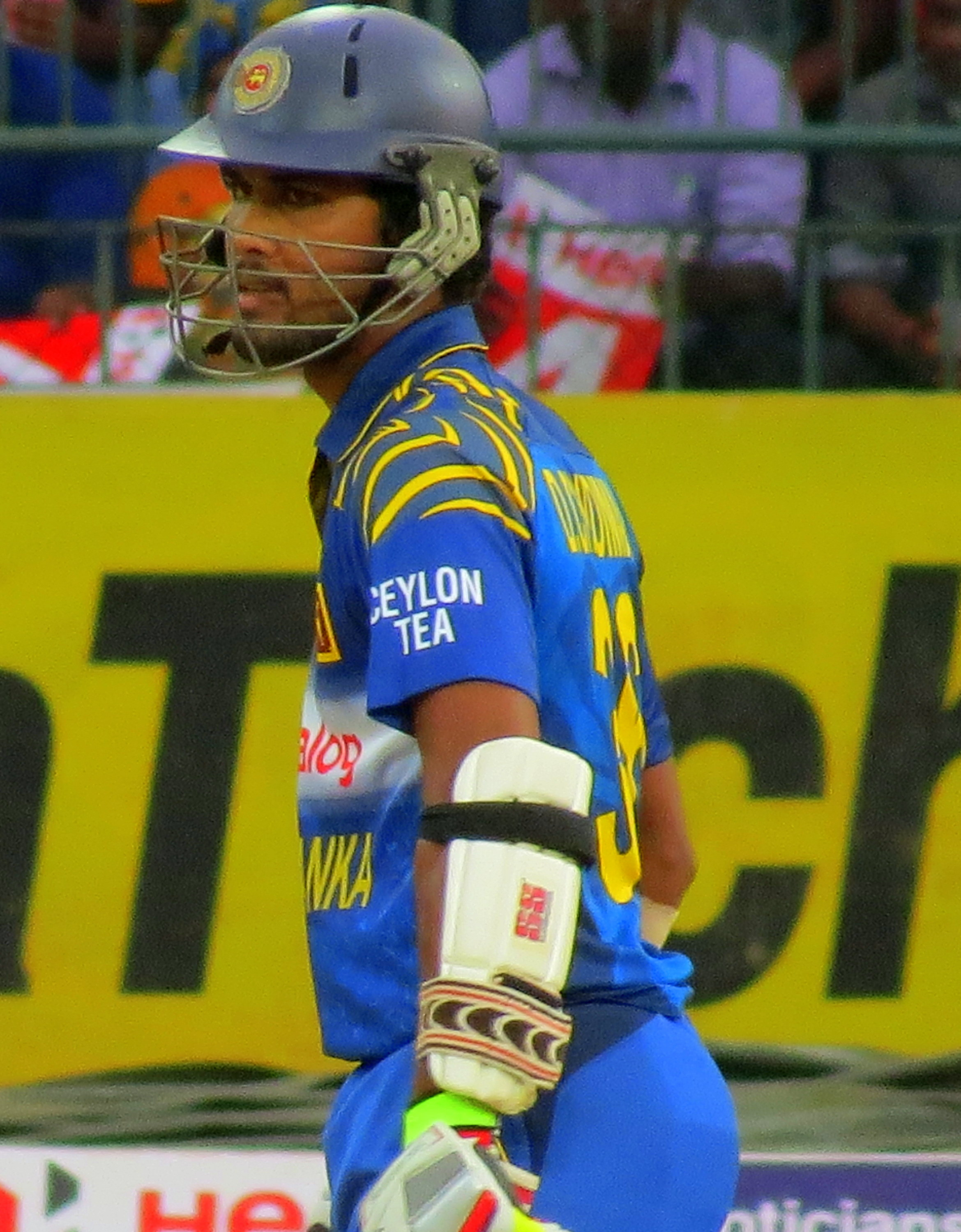

Personal information
- Full name: Lokuge Dinesh Chandimal
- Born: 18 November 1989 (age 37); Balapitiya, Sri Lanka
- Height: 5 ft 9 in (175 cm)
- Batting: Right-handed
- Bowling: Right-arm off-break
- Role: Wicket-keeper-batter

International information
- National side: Sri Lanka (2010–present)
- Test debut (cap 122): 26 December 2011 v South Africa
- Last Test: 17 November 2026 v Pakistan
- ODI debut (cap 144): 1 June 2010 v Zimbabwe
- Last ODI: 30 November 2022 v Afghanistan
- ODI shirt no.: 56 (previously 36, 17)
- T20I debut (cap 33): 30 April 2010 v New Zealand
- Last T20I: 16 July 2025 v Bangladesh
- T20I shirt no.: 56 (previously 36, 17)

Domestic team information
- Years: Team
- 2019–present: Sri Lanka Army
- 2009–2019: Nondescripts Cricket Club
- 2012: Ruhuna
- 2017: Chittagong Vikings
- 2020–2022: Colombo Stars
- 2022: Sylhet Sunrisers
- 2023–2024: Kandy Falcons
- 2026: Dambulla Sixers

Career statistics
| Competition | Test | ODI | T20I | FC |
|---|---|---|---|---|
| Matches | 95 | 157 | 69 | 193 |
| Runs scored | 6,542 | 3,854 | 1,066 | 13,849 |
| Batting average | 42.48 | 31.85 | 19.38 | 47.92 |
| 100s/50s | 16/36 | 4/24 | 0/6 | 38/69 |
| Top score | 206* | 111 | 66* | 354* |
| Catches/stumpings | 96/10 | 62/8 | 37/6 | 203/24 |
Medal record
Representing Sri Lanka
Men's Cricket
ICC T20 World Cup
| Winner | 2014 Bangladesh |
| Runner-up | 2012 Sri Lanka |
ACC Asia Cup
| Winner | 2014 Bangladesh |
| Winner | 2022 United Arab Emirates |
Asian Games
| Gold medal – first place | 2014 Incheon | Team |
South Asian Games
| Silver medal – second place | 2010 Dhaka | Team |
- Source: ESPNcricinfo, 20 November 2026
- Military career
- Allegiance: Sri Lanka
- Branch: Sri Lanka Army
- Service years: 2019–present
- Rank: Major
- Unit: Sri Lanka Army Ordnance Corps

Lokuge Dinesh Chandimal (Sinhala: ලොකුගේ දිනේෂ් චන්දිමාල්; born 18 November 1989) is a professional Sri Lankan cricketer and a former captain of the Sri Lanka national cricket team. A handy right-handed middle order batter who sometimes plays as the wicket-keeper, Chandimal lead Sri Lanka in the group stages of the 2014 ICC World Twenty20 in which Sri Lanka ended up as the champions.

On 26 September 2019, he joined the Sri Lankan Army as a volunteer commissioned officer and was eligible to play for Sri Lanka Army Sports Club. In August 2020, while playing for the Sri Lanka Army Sports Club, Chandimal made the highest score in domestic first-class cricket in Sri Lanka, with an unbeaten 354 runs against Saracens CC.

== Early years and domestic cricket ==
Chandimal started his cricketing career as a teenager at his first school Dharmasoka College, Ambalangoda. Later he moved to Ananda College, Colombo captaining the under-17 team. In 2008, he was appointed captain of the school's first eleven, which he led in 13 outright wins in a season, re-writing history in Sri Lankan school cricket. He was the first schoolboy cricketer to exceed 1,000 runs with an aggregate of 1,580, and won the Schoolboy Cricketer of the Year Award in 2009. After leaving school, he joined the Nondescripts Cricket Club.

Chandimal has the record for the most dismissals as wicketkeeper for Sri Lanka in Youth ODI history with 51 dismissals and also the only Sri Lankan wicketkeeper to involve in 50+ dismissals in Youth ODI history.

In First class career, he scored 64, 04, and 109 in his first three innings for Sri Lanka Cricket Development XI. He is an aggressive batsman who scored two centuries for his country's U-19s, which he vice-captained, and played for the Sri Lanka Cricket XI and Schools Invitation XI for List A and Twenty20 cricket. During the 2012 Indian Premier League (IPL) auction, he was bought for $50,000 by the Rajasthan Royals. Later, he signed a contract with Chittagong Vikings to play in the upcoming Bangladesh Premier League for the Chittagong Vikings.

In March 2018, he was named as the captain of the Colombo squad for the 2017–18 Super Four Provincial Tournament. The following month, he was also named as Colombo's captain for the 2018 Super Provincial One Day Tournament. In August 2018, he was named as Colombo's captain for the 2018 SLC T20 League.

On 19 February 2019, Chandimal scored a century in the 2018–19 SLC Twenty20 Tournament, a day after he was dropped from Sri Lanka's One Day International (ODI) squad for their series against South Africa.

In March 2019, he was named as Colombo's captain for the 2019 Super Provincial One Day Tournament. In August 2020, in the final round of matches in the 2019–20 Premier League Tournament, Chandimal scored 354 not out, batting for Sri Lanka Army Sports Club. It was the highest first-class score in a domestic match in Sri Lanka, beating the previous record of 351 runs scored by Kithuruwan Vithanage.

In October 2020, he was drafted by the Colombo Kings for the inaugural edition of the Lanka Premier League. In August 2021, he was named as the captain of the SLC Reds team for the 2021 SLC Invitational T20 League tournament. In July 2022, he was signed by the Colombo Stars for the third edition of the Lanka Premier League.

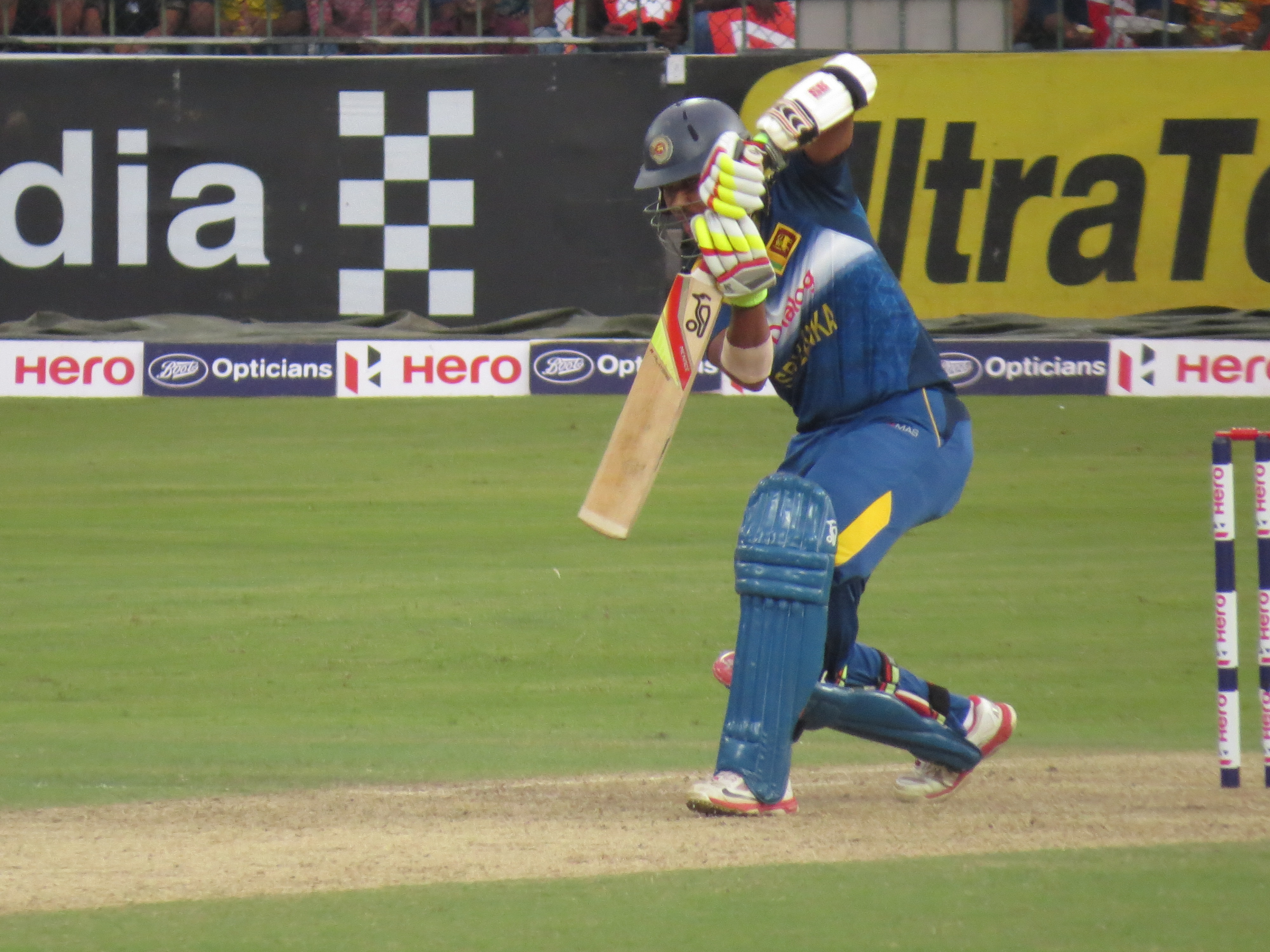
Chandimal batting against England in 2014

== International career ==
=== Early years ===
He made his international debut during the 2010 ICC World Twenty20 in the West Indies, playing in Sri Lanka's group games against New Zealand and Zimbabwe in the initial group stage and then playing against Australia in the "Super Eight" final series.

After also playing against New Zealand in a Twenty20 International match in Florida, Chandimal was selected for an ODI tri-series in Zimbabwe, where the two teams also played India. He made his debut against Zimbabwe, scoring an unbeaten 10 as his team cruised to a nine-wicket win and then registered his maiden international century by scoring 111 runs off 118 balls against India, an innings that helped his team both win the match (by six wickets) and knock India out of the tournament. He also became the youngest Sri Lankan to score an ODI century.

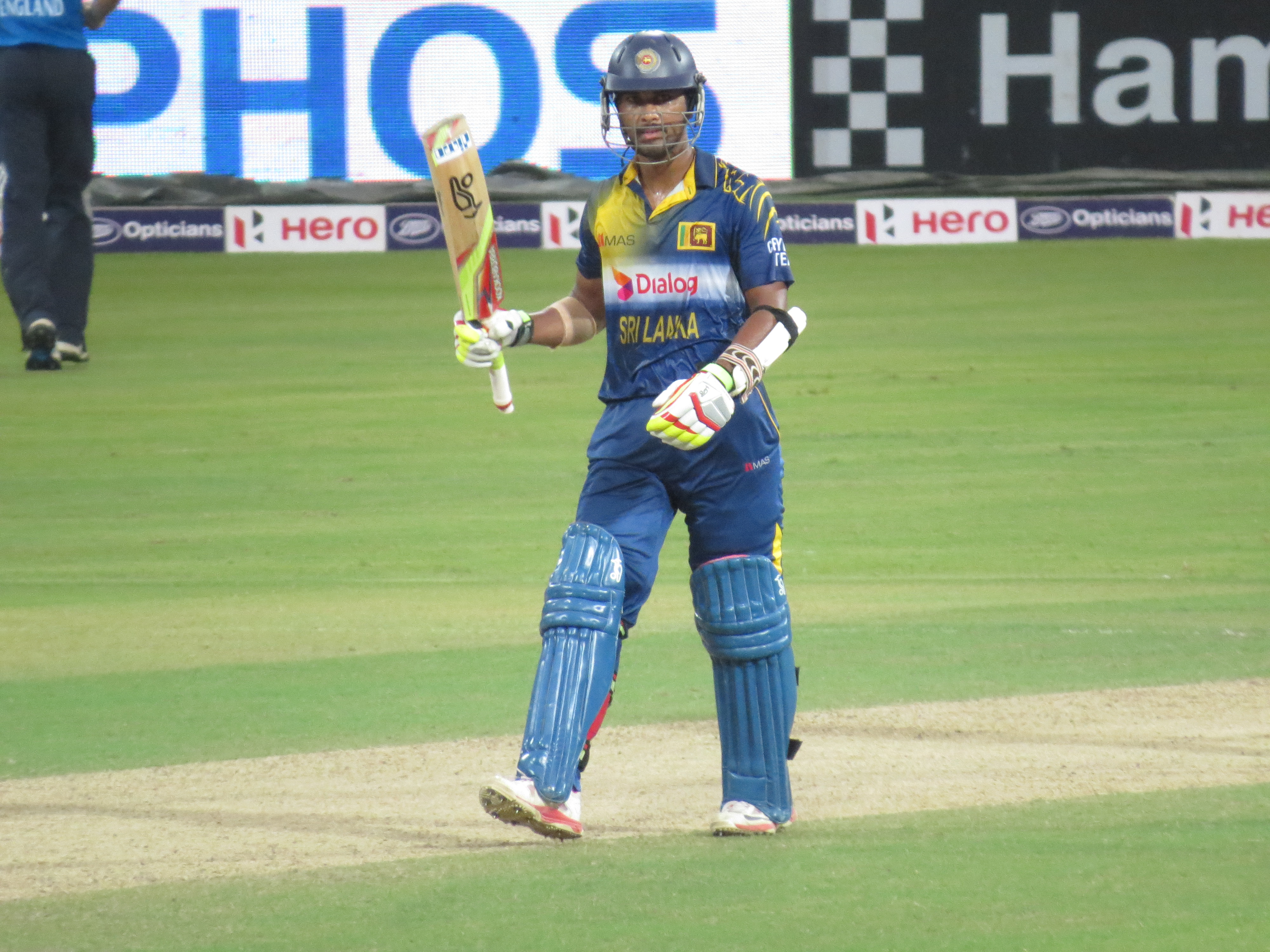

Chandimal made his Test debut for Sri Lanka in December 2011, in the second Test of the series against South Africa in Durban. He made half-centuries (58 and 54) in each of Sri Lanka's innings becoming the first Sri Lankan batsman to score half centuries in both innings on Test debut. This incidentally led Sri Lanka to their first Test win in South Africa.

Chandimal was a key member of 2012 ICC World Twenty20 runner-up team and 2014 ICC World Twenty20 winning team. He led Sri Lanka in first group stage of the 2014 ICC World Twenty20, until was suspended for slow over rate and subsequently lost the place in the team for the remainder of the tournament. Chandimal holds the joint record for taking the most catches in a single T20I as a fielder (4) along with Darren Sammy, Ajinkya Rahane, Peter Borren, Corey Anderson and Babar Hayat. He too has taken the most catches for Sri Lanka in a single T20I.

During 2015 ICC Cricket World Cup, against Australia in Sydney, Chandimal scored 50 off 22 balls, this was the fastest fifty by a Sri Lankan batsman in Cricket world cup history, before Angelo Mathews scored a 20-ball fifty, where Sri Lanka had a massive 377 target to chase. During the innings, he was retired hurt, and eventually Sri Lanka lost the match by 64 runs.

Chandimal was included to the test series with India as the permanent wicket-keeper and showed an excellent talent in the test level as well. In the first innings, he scored 59 runs but eventually Sri Lanka were all out for 183. In the second innings after India's huge 375 runs, Sri Lanka were all out for 367 runs courtesy of Chandimal's brilliant knock of unbeaten 162 runs. He was the star for the Sri Lankan innings with 16 fours and 4 sixes. Sri Lanka had a 175 lead and India were just ended with 112 runs and Sri Lanka won the match by 63 runs. Due to Chandimal's batting performance in the right time, he was adjudged as man of the match.

=== Failure and comeback ===
His third ODI century came after five years of delay, against Ireland on 16 June 2016.

Chandimal had an impressive run scoring throughout the England series in 2016 and then in Australia series at home. He scored five consecutive ODI half centuries, which equals most consecutive ODI fifties by a Sri Lankan with Jayasuriya, Sangakkara and Dilshan. He missed the Sri Lankan record, when he was declared LBW by Adam Zampa on 48, just short of 2 runs for Chandimal's sixth consecutive fifty. Chandimal finished the England series with scores of 52, 62, 63 and 53 and in first ODI against Australia, he scored his fifth consecutive fifty with unbeaten 80.

Chandimal was not initially selected for the limited over series against India, but after the injury to Danushka Gunathilaka, Chandimal was brought into the ODI team. He played in the third ODI as the opener with Niroshan Dickwella and scored 37 runs, when he hit by a bouncer and injured his right thumb. After the conclusion of Sri Lanka's innings, media reported that he has a hairline fracture and ruled out of the Indian tour.

=== Captaincy ===
On 17 July 2013, Chandimal became the youngest ODI captain for Sri Lanka, when he was appointed as the ODI captain for first two matches against South Africa in Colombo. In 2013, he was also appointed captain of the Sri Lanka Twenty20 International team and also vice-captain of the country's one day international team. During the 2014 ICC World Twenty20, he stepped down from the captaincy after injury and suspension due to slow over rate and later Lasith Malinga appointed as the captain. Malinga was able to lead the team for their first ever Twenty20 champion title and this strengthen Malinga as the permanent captain of the Twenty20 team.

He led the ODI team and T20I team in many occasions, where the permanent captains Angelo Mathews and Lasith Malinga were injured in many occasions. However, after many poor performances in bilateral series and in 2017 ICC Champions Trophy, Chandimal was dropped from limited over squads. During Zimbabwe tour, he was again dropped from the ODI squad as well. However, after terrible loss to Zimbabwe at home for the first time, the captaincy of Mathews was questioned and criticized by many critics. The result was, Mathews stepped down from the role in all formats on 11 July 2017. With that, Chandimal was named permanent captain of the Test team for Sri Lanka.

His first test captaincy came during the one-off Test against Zimbabwe in July 2017. In the match, Chandimal scored 55 in the first innings, which is recorded as the highest test score by a debut captain in a first innings for Sri Lanka as well. Sri Lanka won the match by 4 wickets at the end, by chasing massive total of 388 runs. This chase was recorded as the best chase by Sri Lanka in Tests and best successful chase in Asia. However prior to India tour, Chandimal was contracted pneumonia and ruled out of the first test. Rangana Herath was appointed as the stand-in captain in the first match. However, with two more injuries during the match, Sri Lanka lost the match by 304 runs. Sri Lanka lost all three games, with the heaviest defeats recorded at home.

During the first Test against Pakistan on 28 September at Abu Dhabi, Chandimal scored his maiden Test century as captain, which lasted unbeaten for nine hours. He scored 155 runs the match and guided the team to 400 runs for the first innings. With the magical spin from maestro Rangana Herath and Dilruwan Perera, Sri Lanka finally won the match by 21 runs, despite a low score in the second innings.

On 6 October 2017, against Pakistan, Sri Lanka played their first day-night Test match. Chandimal scored 62 in the first innings, but dismissed for naught in the second innings. However, Sri Lanka won the match by 68 runs and won the series 2–0. With that, Chandimal had the distinction of being first captain in Sri Lanka's first day-night Test, and went to win the match. During the second Test against India at Nagpur, Sri Lanka experiences their heaviest defeat in test cricket. Skipper Chandimal was the only stand out performer in the match with two fifties in the match. In the third Test, Chandimal scored his tenth test century, becoming the fastest Sri Lankan to reach ten test centuries with 80 innings, bettering previous record of 84 innings by Thilan Samaraweera. He along with Angelo Mathews had a 181-run partnership in the match. For the partnership, they have faced 476 balls, which ranked as the longest partnership for any pair at the Kotla, longest partnership between a visiting pair in India in the last five years, and the second-longest stand for Sri Lanka against India.

In 2018, Mathews was appointed as the permanent limited over captain after the debate over few weeks. However, in the first match against Zimbabwe in Bangladesh Tri-series, Mathews was sidelined with a right hamstring injury and removed from the squad for three weeks. With that, Chandimal was appointed as the captain. Under his captaincy, Sri Lanka won the tri-series beating Bangladesh in the final. On 7 February 2018, Chandimal was appointed as the captain for T20I team for Sri Lanka for Bangladesh tour, due to injury of permanent limited over captain Angelo Mathews. Under his captaincy, Sri Lanka chased a record breaking total of 193 in the first match and won the match by 6 wickets.

In May 2018, he was one of 33 cricketers to be awarded a national contract by Sri Lanka Cricket ahead of the 2018–19 season.

=== After suspension (2018-2021) ===
Chandimal was included to the one-off Twenty20 International against South Africa on 14 August 2018. He played as the wicket-keeper in the match as well. South Africa bowled out for 99 runs, which is their lowest score in T20Is. However, Sri Lanka lost 7 wickets in the easy chase, where Chandimal protected his end until the end. He was there at the end and held firm through sustained pressure from the South African pack to see Sri Lanka home with an unbeaten 36 runs.

He was appointed limited overs captain after Matthews was sacked after 2018 Asia Cup. Due to poor performances throughout New Zealand and Australia tours, Chandimal was dropped from the Test squad for South Africa tour. Dimuth Karunaratne was named as the stand-in captain for the tour, while Chandimal was released to play domestic cricket and regain his form with the bat. In December 2019, Chandimal was recalled for the Pakistan test series.

On 8 March 2021, Sri Lanka tour of West Indies, during 3rd T20I match Chandimal scored his fifth T20I half century. He scored unbeaten 54* runs and put an unbeaten stand of 85 from 63, Sri Lanka's highest in T20Is for the fifth wicket, with Ashen Bandara. They had dragged the Sri Lanka team to 46 for 4 to 131 for 4. After the series, he was dropped from the squad for Bangladesh and India tours, citing poor performances. Later he asked SLC and its technical committee for clarity about his future in the national team. However, after the impressive performances in the SLC Invitational T20 League, he was included into squad for the South African series in September 2021. He played the third game of the series, which became his 150th ODI and Sri Lanka later won the match and the series. Later the same month, Chandimal was named in Sri Lanka's squad for the 2021 ICC Men's T20 World Cup.

=== Dominating Test arena (2022-present) ===
On 26 May 2022 during the second test match against Bangladesh, Chandimal scored his twelfth Test century, where he made 199-run partnership for the sixth wicket with fellow centurion Angelo Mathews, the highest between the pair in Tests. With two centuries, Sri Lanka piled a mammoth first innings total of 506 and finally won the series 2–0. In the Australian Test series in July 2022, Sri Lanka suffered a huge defeat, where the match ended in three days. Chandimal scored 0 and 13 in the match. However, on 9 July 2022, he scored a brilliant unbeaten 205 runs in the second Test and Sri Lanka posted a total of 554 courtesy of Chandimal's double hundred. With that, he became the first Sri Lankan to score a double century against Australia. Finally Sri Lanka won the match by an innings and 39 runs, marking Sri Lanka's first-ever innings victory in Test cricket against Australia. The series finally ended in draw 1-1 and shared the Warne-Murali Trophy.

Chandimal was a part of the team in 6 test matches in 2022, batted 10 innings and scored 719 runs averaging 102.71 including the double century against Australia. However he was not in the part of squad in the tour of India in 2022. The second test match against New Zealand at Wellington, Chandimal scored a half century and made 126 run partnership for 5th wicket with Dhananjaya De Silva, but finally New Zealand won by an innings and 58 runs. He later scored a fifty against Pakistan and Sri Lanka won the match by 246 runs. Due to his performances Chandimal selected to Wisden World Test Championship XI: WTC 2021- 2023.

On 3 February 2024 against Afghanistan, Chandimal scored his 15th test century, where he made 232 for the fourth wicket along with Angelo Mathews, who also made his 16th test century. With the two centuries, Sri Lanka piled a total of 439 and eventually won the one-off test series by 10 wickets.

Chandimal was promoted to the number 3 position in the batting order with New Zealand tour of Sri Lanka in September 2024. In the second Test against New Zealand, Chandimal scored his 16th century and his fourth 50-plus score in eight Test innings while batting at No. 3, where Sri Lanka posted mammoth 602 runs in the first innings. Eventually, Sri Lanka won the match by an innings and 154 runs and rises to the third in the World Test Championship table.

== Ball tampering controversy in 2018 ==
During the second Test against West Indies at St. Lucia on 17 June 2018, Chandimal was found to be guilty of making ball tampering incidence. After video evidence indicated that on the second day's play, Chandimal was taking sweets out from his left pocket, putting them in his mouth, before applying saliva to the ball within the space of a few seconds. Two on-field umpires Ian Gould, Aleem Dar, television umpire Richard Kettleborough and match referee Javagal Srinath observed the incidence carefully and charged him with one Test ban and two demerit points.

At the end of match, the hearing with match referee Javagal Srinath, his team management and other match officials took place with Chandimal and he wasn't able to recall what it was in mouth when he polish the ball with saliva. As a result, match referee handed Chandimal the maximum punishment available under the ICC Code of Conduct, which was two suspension points and a fine of 100% of his match fee.

However, before finishing the match, Chandimal pleaded not guilty to the ball-tampering incident and this caused trouble at the start of Day 3 of a test match. This was started in the morning when two umpires asked to change the ball used the previous day with a new ball. Sri Lankan players did not accept that and refused to go into the field for the match. The incident got worse when coach Chandika Hathurusinghe and manager Asanka Gurusinha were also involved in the moment with the match referee and umpires. Over the next two hours, several animated discussions took place between management and cricket officials, largely due to the fact that the incident has informed the next morning. If the incidence was announced on the last night, the situation might be different, as said by the players.

With that, Srinath took a decision and asked Sri Lanka to take the field before 11:30 am (the scheduled start had been 9:30), or forfeit the game. Players finally agreed to play the match "under protest". The Match referee awarded West Indies five penalty runs in the match after the incident.

On 11 July 2018, ICC concluded its hearing on the trio, who had pleaded guilty to a level three spirit of cricket offence. His hearing took place before the start of the first Test against South Africa, with him found guilty. He received a two-match ban, with Suranga Lakmal captaining the team in his place. On 16 July 2018, independent Judicial Commissioner handed down a further eight suspension points with maximum possible punishment for their spirit of cricket offence and suspended for four ODIs as well.

== International centuries ==
Chandimal has made 20 international centuries- 16 in Test cricket, and 4 in One Day International (ODI) format.

=== Key ===
- * – Remained not out
- ‡ – Captain of Sri Lanka in that match
- † – Man of the match

=== Test centuries ===
Test centuries scored by Dinesh Chandimal
| No. | Score | Against | Pos. | Inn. | Test | Venue | H/A/N | Date | Result | Ref |
|---|---|---|---|---|---|---|---|---|---|---|
| 1 | 116* | Bangladesh | 6 | 1 | 1/2 | Galle International Stadium, Galle | Home | 13 March 2013 | Drawn | |
| 2 | 102 | Bangladesh | 6 | 2 | 2/2 | R. Premadasa Stadium, Colombo | Home | 16 March 2013 | Won | |
| 3 | 100* | Bangladesh | 5 | 3 | 2/2 | Zohur Ahmed Chowdhury Stadium, Chattogram | Away | 4 February 2014 | Drawn | |
| 4 | 162* † | India | 6 | 3 | 1/3 | Galle International Stadium, Galle | Home | 12 August 2015 | Won | |
| 5 | 151 | West Indies | 4 | 1 | 1/2 | Galle International Stadium, Galle | Home | 14 October 2015 | Won | |
| 6 | 126 | England | 6 | 3 | 2/3 | Riverside Ground, Chester-le-Street | Away | 27 May 2016 | Lost | |
| 7 | 132 | Australia | 6 | 1 | 3/3 | Singhalese Sports Club Cricket Ground, Colombo | Home | 13 August 2016 | Won | |
| 8 | 138 | Bangladesh | 4 | 1 | 2/2 | R. Premadasa Stadium, Colombo | Home | 15 March 2017 | Lost | |
| 9 | 155* ‡ | Pakistan | 5 | 1 | 1/2 | Sheikh Zayed Cricket Stadium, Abu Dhabi | Neutral | 28 September 2017 | Won | |
| 10 | 164 ‡ | India | 5 | 1 | 3/3 | Feroz Shah Kotla Ground, Delhi | Away | 2 December 2017 | Drawn | |
| 11 | 119^ ‡ | West Indies | 5 | 1 | 2/3 | Daren Sammy Cricket Ground, Gros Islet | Away | 14 June 2018 | Drawn | |
| 12 | 124 | Bangladesh | 7 | 2 | 2/2 | Sher-e-Bangla National Cricket Stadium, Mirpur | Away | 23 May 2022 | Won | |
| 13 | 206* | Australia | 5 | 2 | 2/2 | Galle International Stadium, Galle | Home | 8 July 2022 | Won | |
| 14 | 102* | Ireland | 5 | 1 | 1/2 | Galle International Stadium, Galle | Home | 16 April 2023 | Won | |
| 15 | 107 | Afghanistan | 5 | 2 | 1/1 | Singhalese Sports Club Cricket Ground, Colombo | Home | 2 February 2024 | Won | |
| 16 | 116 | New Zealand | 3 | 1 | 2/2 | Galle International Stadium, Galle | Home | 26 September 2024 | Won | |

=== One Day International Centuries ===
ODI Centuries Scored by Dinesh Chandimal
| No. | Score | Against | Pos. | Inn. | S/R | Venue | H/A/N | Date | Result | Ref |
|---|---|---|---|---|---|---|---|---|---|---|
| 1 | 111 † | India | 3 | 2 | 94.06 | Harare Sports Club, Harare | N | 5 June 2010 | Won | |
| 2 | 105*† | England | 3 | 2 | 83.33 | Lord's, London | A | 3 July 2011 | Won | |
| 3 | 100*† | Ireland | 4 | 1 | 93.45 | Malahide Cricket Club Ground, Dublin | A | 16 June 2016 | Won | |
| 4 | 102 | Australia | 4 | 1 | 78.46 | Rangiri Dambulla International Stadium, Dambulla | H | 28 August 2016 | Lost | |

== Personal life ==
On 26 December 2004, Dinesh was just a 14-year-old boy when his family home was destroyed by the Indian Ocean Tsunami tragedy. He still frequents Balapitiya, to memorialize the tragic incident which devastated his family.

Chandimal's younger brother Kamesh Nirmal is also a cricketer. During second round of the Inter School Under-17 Division I tournament in 2017, Kamesh scored a match winning century against St. Xavier's College, Marawila and Ananda won the match by 129 runs. Following his brother's foot steps Kamesh scored a brilliant century in the 89th Battle of the Maroons.

Chandimal married his longtime partner Ishika Jayasekara on 1 May 2015 in Colombo. In October 2020, he was commissioned as a Major in the Sri Lanka Army Volunteer Force attached the Sri Lanka Army Ordnance Corps.
