= Mahesh Kumara =

Sri Lankan cricketer (born 1999)

Personal information
- Full name: Liyanagedara Pauluge Pathum Mahesh Kumara
- Born: 23 April 1999 (age 27); Ragama, Sri Lanka
- Batting: Right-handed
- Role: Wicket-keeper

Domestic team information
- Years: Team
- 2019/20–present: Sri Lanka Army Sports Club
- 2022/23: Galle
- Source: Cricinfo, 14 December 2019

Mahesh Kumara (born 23 April 1999) is a Sri Lankan cricketer. He made his List A debut on 14 December 2019, for Sri Lanka Army Sports Club in the 2019–20 Invitation Limited Over Tournament. He made his Twenty20 debut on 8 January 2020, for Sri Lanka Army Sports Club in the 2019–20 SLC Twenty20 Tournament. He made his first-class debut on 31 January 2020, for Sri Lanka Army Sports Club in the 2019–20 Premier League Tournament.
