= Kasun Caldera =

Sri Lankan cricketer (born 1992)

Personal information
- Born: 3 November 1992 (age 34)
- Source: Cricinfo, 8 March 2020

Kasun Caldera (born 3 November 1992) is a Sri Lankan cricketer. He made his List A debut for Nondescripts Cricket Club in the 2018–19 Premier Limited Overs Tournament on 10 March 2019. He made his first-class debut on 6 March 2020, for Nondescripts Cricket Club in the 2019–20 Premier League Tournament.
