= Harri Aravinthan =

English cricketer (born 2000)

Harriharan Aravinthan
Personal information
- Born: 22 February 2000 (age 26); London, England
- Nickname: Harri
- Batting: Right-handed
- Bowling: Right-arm fast-medium
- Source: Cricinfo, 1 March 2020

Harri Aravinthan (born 22 February 2000) is an English cricketer. He made his first-class debut on 28 February 2020, for Tamil Union Cricket and Athletic Club in the 2019–20 Premier League Tournament in Sri Lanka. Prior to his first-class debut, he has also played for Surrey 2nd XI in England.
