= Umesh Lakshan =

Sri Lankan cricketer (born 1999)

Personal information
- Born: 11 October 1999 (age 27)
- Source: Cricinfo, 8 January 2020

Umesh Lakshan (born 11 October 1999) is a Sri Lankan cricketer. He made his Twenty20 debut on 8 January 2020, for Lankan Cricket Club in the 2019–20 SLC Twenty20 Tournament. He made his first-class debut on 14 March 2020, for Lankan Cricket Club in the 2019–20 Premier League Tournament.
