= Iresh Chamara =

Sri Lankan cricketer (born 1994)

Personal information
- Born: 4 March 1994 (age 32)
- Source: Cricinfo, 13 March 2020

Iresh Chamara (born 4 March 1994) is a Sri Lankan cricketer. He made his first-class debut on 13 March 2020, for Sri Lanka Army Sports Club in the 2019–20 Premier League Tournament. He made his Twenty20 debut on 14 March 2021, for Nugegoda Sports and Welfare Club in the 2020–21 SLC Twenty20 Tournament.
