= Imthiyas Slaza =

Sri Lankan cricketer (born 2000)

Personal information
- Born: 7 September 2000 (age 26)
- Source: Cricinfo, 13 March 2020

Imthiyas Slaza (born 7 September 2000) is a Sri Lankan cricketer. He made his first-class debut on 13 March 2020, for Moors Sports Club in the 2019–20 Premier League Tournament.
