= Heshan Hettiarachchi =

Sri Lankan cricketer (born 1998)

Personal information
- Born: 30 October 1998 (age 28)

Heshan Hettiarachchi (born 30 October 1998) is a Sri Lankan cricketer.He was an alumnus of Mahanama College. He made his Twenty20 debut for Colombo Cricket Club in the 2018–19 SLC Twenty20 Tournament on 15 February 2019. He made his List A debut on 14 December 2019, for Sri Lanka Army Sports Club in the 2019–20 Invitation Limited Over Tournament. He made his first-class debut on 31 January 2020, for Sri Lanka Army Sports Club in the 2019–20 Premier League Tournament.
