= Janith Silva =

Sri Lankan cricketer (born 1990)

Personal information
- Full name: Arumadura Janith Chaturanga Silva
- Born: 16 November 1990 (age 35); Mahamodara, Sri Lanka
- Source: ESPNcricinfo, 4 December 2016

Janith Silva (born 16 November 1990) is a Sri Lankan cricketer. He made his first-class debut for Sri Lanka Army Sports Club in the 2010–11 Premier Trophy on 22 April 2011. In August 2018, he was named in Kandy's squad the 2018 SLC T20 League.
