= Kalana Perera =

Sri Lankan cricketer

Personal information
- Full name: Kopiyawattege Kalana Vichithra Perera
- Born: 28 July 2000 (age 26); Panadura, Sri Lanka
- Batting: Left-handed
- Bowling: Left-arm medium-fast
- Role: Bowler
Medal record
Representing Sri Lanka
Men's cricket
South Asian Games
Silver medal – second place	2019 Kathmandu/Pokhara	Team
- Source: Cricinfo, 28 June 2020

Kopiyawattege Kalana Vichithra Perera (born 28 July 2000) is a Sri Lankan cricketer. In November 2019, he was named in Sri Lanka's squad for the 2019 ACC Emerging Teams Asia Cup in Bangladesh. He made his List A debut for Sri Lanka, against Oman, in the Emerging Teams Cup on 14 November 2019. Prior to his List A debut, he was named in Sri Lanka's squad for the 2018 Under-19 Cricket World Cup. Later the same month, he was named in Sri Lanka's squad for the men's cricket tournament at the 2019 South Asian Games. The Sri Lanka team won the silver medal, after they lost to Bangladesh by seven wickets in the final.

He made his Twenty20 debut on 4 January 2020, for Sinhalese Sports Club in the 2019–20 SLC Twenty20 Tournament. He made his first-class debut on 22 February 2020, for Sinhalese Sports Club in the 2019–20 Premier League Tournament, scoring a century in the first innings. In October 2020, he was drafted by the Colombo Kings for the inaugural edition of the Lanka Premier League. In March 2021, he was part of the Sinhalese Sports Club team that won the 2020–21 SLC Twenty20 Tournament, the first time they had won the tournament since 2005.

In August 2021, he was named in the SLC Blues team for the 2021 SLC Invitational T20 League tournament. In November 2021, he was selected to play for the Dambulla Giants following the players' draft for the 2021 Lanka Premier League. In July 2022, he was signed by the Dambulla Giants for the third edition of the Lanka Premier League.
