= Hashan Sandeepa =

Sri Lankan cricketer (born 1998)

Personal information
- Born: 2 November 1998 (age 28)
- Source: Cricinfo, 8 March 2020

Hashan Sandeepa (born 2 November 1998) is a Sri Lankan cricketer. He made his Twenty20 debut on 15 January 2020, for Burgher Recreation Club in the 2019–20 SLC Twenty20 Tournament. He made his first-class debut on 6 March 2020, for Burgher Recreation Club in the 2019–20 Premier League Tournament.
