= Dinuka Dilshan =

Sri Lankan cricketer (born 2000)

Personal information
- Born: 24 May 2000 (age 26)
- Source: Cricinfo, 21 February 2020

Dinuka Dilshan (born 24 May 2000) is a Sri Lankan cricketer. He made his first-class debut on 21 February 2020, for Moors Sports Club in the 2019–20 Premier League Tournament, scoring a century in the first innings. He made his Twenty20 debut on 9 March 2021, for Moors Sports Club in the 2020–21 SLC Twenty20 Tournament. He made his List A debut on 7 April 2021, for Moors Sports Club in the 2020–21 Major Clubs Limited Over Tournament.
