= Kamesh Nirmal =

Sri Lankan cricketer (born 2000)

Personal information
- Full name: Lokuge Kamesh Nirmal
- Born: 14 February 2000 (age 26); Balapitiya, Sri Lanka
- Source: Cricinfo, 15 December 2019

Kamesh Nirmal (born 14 February 2000) is a Sri Lankan cricketer. He made his List A debut on 15 December 2019, for Tamil Union Cricket and Athletic Club in the 2019–20 Invitation Limited Over Tournament. He made his Twenty20 debut on 4 January 2020, for Tamil Union Cricket and Athletic Club in the 2019–20 SLC Twenty20 Tournament. He made his first-class debut on 31 January 2020, for Tamil Union Cricket and Athletic Club in the 2019–20 Premier League Tournament.
