= Lakshan Edirisinghe =

Sri Lankan cricketer (born 1993)

Personal information
- Full name: Lakshan Eranda Kumara Edirisinghe
- Born: 31 January 1993 (age 33); Anuradhapura, Sri Lanka
- Nickname: Ediri
- Batting: Left-handed
- Bowling: Right-arm off break
- Role: Top-order batter, occasional off-spinner

Domestic team information
- Years: Team
- 2012–2023: Sri Lanka Army Sports Club
- 2023–present: Galle Cricket Club
- 2025–present: Wellington Cricket Club
- Source: Cricinfo, 11 June 2025

Lakshan Eranda Kumara Edirisinghe (born 31 January 1993) is a Sri Lankan first-class cricketer who plays as a left-handed top-order batter and right-arm off-spin bowler. He currently represents Galle Cricket Club in domestic cricket, having previously played for Sri Lanka Army Sports Club. He was selected by Dambulla Aura for the 2023 Lanka Premier League and plays league cricket in England for Wellington Cricket Club.

== Early life and education ==
Edirisinghe was born in Anuradhapura and studied and played school cricket at Anuradhapura Central College. His cricketing talent earned him a place at Zahira College, Colombo to pursue higher-level school cricket opportunities.

== Domestic career ==
Edirisinghe made his first-class debut for Sri Lanka Army Sports Club in the 2012–13 Premier League Tournament on 15 February 2013. He played for Army SC for over a decade before joining Galle Cricket Club in 2023. During the 2022–23 season, he scored 1,105 runs in first-class cricket at an average of 46.04, including five centuries.

== Playing style ==
Edirisinghe is known for his composed left-handed batting and effectiveness against spin. He contributes as an occasional off-spin bowler and is valued for his top-order stability.

== Franchise and overseas career ==
In 2023, Edirisinghe was drafted by Dambulla Aura in the Lanka Premier League. In 2025, he signed with Wellington Cricket Club in Somerset, England, as their overseas professional.

== Career statistics ==
As of April 2025:

- First-class: 75 matches, 3,702 runs (HS 134), average 33.05; 18 wickets, best 4/51
- List A: 51 matches, 1,409 runs (HS 78), average 32.76; 9 wickets, best 2/1
