= Risith Upamal =

Sri Lankan cricketer (born 1996)

Personal information
- Born: 1 November 1996 (age 30); Colombo, Sri Lanka
- Source: Cricinfo, 5 April 2017

Risith Upamal (born 1 November 1996) is a Sri Lankan cricketer. He made his List A debut for Polonnaruwa District in the 2016–17 Districts One Day Tournament on 18 March 2017.
