= Nipun Malinga =

Sri Lankan cricketer (born 2000)

Personal information
- Full name: Lamahewage Nipun Malinga
- Born: 27 February 2000 (age 26); Galle, Sri Lanka
- Batting: Left-handed
- Bowling: Right arm fast-medium
- Role: All-rounder

Domestic team information
- Years: Team
- Galle Gladiators
- Source: Cricinfo, 14 December 2019

Lamahewage Nipun Malinga (born 27 February 2000) is a Sri Lankan cricketer. He made his List A debut on 14 December 2019, for Colts Cricket Club in the 2019–20 Invitation Limited Over Tournament. Prior to his List A debut, he was named in Sri Lanka's squad for the 2018 Under-19 Cricket World Cup. He made his first-class debut on 7 February 2020, for Colts Cricket Club in the 2019–20 Premier League Tournament. He made his Twenty20 debut on 6 March 2021, for Colts Cricket Club in the 2020–21 SLC Twenty20 Tournament.

In April 2022, Sri Lanka Cricket (SLC) named him in the Sri Lanka Emerging Team's squad for their tour to England. In July 2022, he was signed by the Galle Gladiators for the third edition of the Lanka Premier League.
