= Ashian Daniel =

Sri Lankan cricketer

Personal information
- Born: 20 February 2001 (age 25); Moratuwa
- Batting: Right-handed
- Bowling: Right-arm off-break
- Source: Cricinfo, 13 January 2022

Ashian Daniel (born 20 February 2001) is a Sri Lankan cricketer. He made his first-class debut for Nondescripts Cricket Club in the 2019–20 Premier League Tournament on 15 August 2020. Prior to his debut, he was named in Sri Lanka's squad for the 2020 Under-19 Cricket World Cup. He made his Twenty20 debut on 4 March 2021, for Nondescripts Cricket Club in the 2020–21 SLC Twenty20 Tournament. He made his List A debut on 24 March 2021, for Nondescripts Cricket Club in the 2020–21 Major Clubs Limited Over Tournament.

In August 2021, he was named in the SLC Greys team for the 2021 SLC Invitational T20 League tournament. In November 2021, he was selected to play for the Galle Gladiators following the players' draft for the 2021 Lanka Premier League.

In January 2022, he was named as one of six reserve players in Sri Lanka's One Day International (ODI) squad for their series against Zimbabwe. In February 2022, he was named in Sri Lanka's Twenty20 International (T20I) squad for their series against India. In April 2022, Sri Lanka Cricket (SLC) named him in the Sri Lanka Emerging Team's squad for their tour to England. In June 2022, he was named in the Sri Lanka A squad for their matches against Australia A during Australia's tour of Sri Lanka. In July 2022, he was signed by the Kandy Falcons for the third edition of the Lanka Premier League.
