= Mohammed Shamaaz =

Sri Lankan cricketer (born 2001)

Personal information
- Full name: Mohammed Shamaaz Nawfer
- Born: 2 February 2001 (age 25); Colombo
- Batting: Right-handed
- Role: Wicket-keeper
- Source: Cricinfo, 6 March 2020

Mohammed Shamaaz Nawfer (born 2 February 2001) is a Sri Lankan cricketer. He made his first-class debut on 6 March 2020, for Moors Sports Club in the 2019–20 Premier League Tournament. Prior to his first-class debut, he was named in Sri Lanka's squad for the 2020 Under-19 Cricket World Cup. He made his Twenty20 debut on 5 March 2021, for Moors Sports Club in the 2020–21 SLC Twenty20 Tournament. He made his List A debut on 24 March 2021, for Moors Sports Club in the 2020–21 Major Clubs Limited Over Tournament. In November 2021, he was selected to play for the Galle Gladiators following the players' draft for the 2021 Lanka Premier League.
