= Saminda Fernando =

Sri Lankan cricketer (born 1996)

Personal information
- Full name: Galwarige Saminda Maduranga Fernando
- Born: 8 June 1996 (age 30); Moratuwa, Sri Lanka
- Batting: Right-handed
- Role: Wicketkeeper
- Source: ESPNcricinfo, 16 February 2017

Saminda Fernando (born 8 June 1996) is a Sri Lankan cricketer. He made his first-class debut for Ragama Cricket Club in the 2016–17 Premier League Tournament on 14 February 2017. He made his List A debut for Ragama Cricket Club in the 2017–18 Premier Limited Overs Tournament on 14 March 2018. He made his Twenty20 debut for Ragama Cricket Club in the 2018–19 SLC Twenty20 Tournament on 18 February 2019. In August 2021, he was named in the SLC Greens team for the 2021 SLC Invitational T20 League tournament.
