= Himasha Liyanage =

Sri Lankan cricketer (born 1996)

Personal information
- Full name: Himasha Shehan Liyanage
- Born: 15 September 1996 (age 30); Colombo, Sri Lanka
- Batting: Left-handed
- Bowling: Right-arm off-break
- Role: Batsman

Domestic team information
- Years: Team
- 2016–present: Sri Lanka Army Sports Club
- Source: ESPNcricinfo, 2 December 2016

Himasha Liyanage (born 15 September 1996) is a Sri Lankan cricketer. He made his first-class debut for Sri Lanka Army Sports Club in the 2016–17 Premier League Tournament on 2 December 2016. He made his List A debut for Badulla District in the 2016–17 Districts One Day Tournament on 22 March 2017. He made his Twenty20 debut for Sri Lanka Army Sports Club in the 2017–18 SLC Twenty20 Tournament on 24 February 2018. In August 2021, he was named in the SLC Blues team for the 2021 SLC Invitational T20 League tournament.
