= Minod Bhanuka =

Sri Lankan cricketer (born 1995)

Personal information
- Full name: Minod Bhanuka Ranasinghe
- Born: 29 April 1995 (age 31); Wennapuwa, Sri Lanka
- Batting: Left-handed
- Role: Wicket-keeper-batsman

International information
- National side: Sri Lanka (2019-2021)
- Only Test (cap 152): 3 January 2021 v South Africa
- ODI debut (cap 192): 2 October 2019 v Pakistan
- Last ODI: 4 September 2021 v South Africa
- T20I debut (cap 82): 5 October 2019 v Pakistan
- Last T20I: 29 July 2021 v India

Domestic team information
- Years: Team
- 2017: Sinhalese Sports Club
- 2018-present: Colombo Cricket Club
- 2020: Jaffna Stallions
- 2021: Kandy Warriors

Career statistics
Competition	Test	ODI	T20I	FC
Matches	1	6	5	61
Runs scored	6	140	64	4,067
Batting average	3.00	23.33	16.00	44.20
100s/50s	0/0	0/0	0/0	12/14
Top score	5	36	36	342
Catches/stumpings	0/0	5/1	6/0	145/43
- Source: Cricinfo, 26 July 2022

Minod Bhanuka Ranasinghe (born 29 April 1995) is a professional Sri Lankan cricketer who plays all formats of the game. He made his international debut for the Sri Lanka cricket team in October 2019. He was part of Sri Lanka's squad for the 2014 ICC Under-19 Cricket World Cup. He is an old boy of Maliyadeva College, Kurunegala.

== Domestic career ==
In a 2015–16 Premier League Tournament match in January 2016, he scored 342 runs for Sinhalese Sports Club against Badureliya Sports Club at Surrey Village Cricket Ground, Maggona.

In March 2018, he was named in Kandy's squad for the 2017–18 Super Four Provincial Tournament. The following month, he was also named in Kandy's squad for the 2018 Super Provincial One Day Tournament.

In August 2018, he was named in Dambulla's squad the 2018 SLC T20 League. In March 2019, he was named in Galle's squad for the 2019 Super Provincial One Day Tournament. In October 2020, he was drafted by the Jaffna Stallions for the inaugural edition of the Lanka Premier League. In August 2021, he was named in the SLC Greys team for the 2021 SLC Invitational T20 League tournament. SLC Greys won the tournament, with Bhanuka being named the player of the match in the final.

In July 2022, he was signed by the Kandy Falcons for the third edition of the Lanka Premier League.

== International career ==
He was part of Sri Lanka's squad for the 2014 ICC Under-19 Cricket World Cup. In October 2017, he was named in Sri Lanka's Twenty20 International (T20I) squad for their series against Pakistan in the UAE, but he did not play. In September 2019, he was named in Sri Lanka's squads for the series against Pakistan in Pakistan. He made his One Day International (ODI) debut for Sri Lanka, against Pakistan, on 2 October 2019. He made his Twenty20 International (T20I) debut for Sri Lanka, also against Pakistan, on 5 October 2019.

In November 2019, he was named in Sri Lanka's squad for the 2019 ACC Emerging Teams Asia Cup in Bangladesh. In December 2020, Gunathilake was named in Sri Lanka's Test squad for their series against South Africa. He made his Test debut for Sri Lanka, against South Africa, on 3 January 2021.

In September 2021, he was added to Sri Lanka's squad for the 2021 ICC Men's T20 World Cup. In June 2022, he was named in the Sri Lanka A squad for their matches against Australia A during Australia's tour of Sri Lanka.
