= Lahiru Samarakoon =

Sri Lankan cricketer

Personal information
- Full name: Samarakoon Mudiyanselage Lahiru Dharshana Samarakoon
- Born: 3 March 1997 (age 29); Kandy, Sri Lanka
- Batting: Left-handed
- Bowling: Right-arm fast-medium
- Role: All-rounder

International information
- National side: Sri Lanka
- Only T20I (cap 105): 4 October 2023 v Afghanistan

Domestic team information
- Years: Team
- 2015: Galle
- 2024: Durdanto Dhaka
- 2025: Durbar Rajshahi
- Source: ESPNcricinfo, 23 December 2015

Lahiru Samarakoon (born 3 March 1997) is a Sri Lankan cricketer who plays for Galle Cricket Club. He made his List A debut on 2 December 2015 in the AIA Premier Limited Over Tournament. In December 2015 he was named in Sri Lanka's squad for the 2016 Under-19 Cricket World Cup. He made his first-class debut for Tamil Union Cricket and Athletic Club in the 2016–17 Premier League Tournament on 28 December 2016. He made his Twenty20 debut for Bloomfield Cricket and Athletic Club in the 2017–18 SLC Twenty20 Tournament on 24 February 2018.

In March 2018, he was named in Kandy's squad for the 2017–18 Super Four Provincial Tournament. In May 2018, it was reported that he would join Camberley Cricket Club in England for the 2018 season. He made his debut on 26 May 2018, taking 2/34 from his 10 overs, as well as completing a catch in the field.

His inaugural season in English club cricket finished with a figures of 33 wickets at 15.36 and 301 runs at 30.10, as Camberley finished fourth in the Surrey Championship First Division. In October 2020, he was drafted by the Kandy Tuskers for the inaugural edition of the Lanka Premier League. In August 2021, he was named in the SLC Blues team for the 2021 SLC Invitational T20 League tournament.
