= Ashan Randika =

Sri Lankan cricketer (born 1993)

Personal information
- Full name: Denagamage Ashan Randika
- Born: 15 November 1993 (age 32); Galle, Sri Lanka
- Batting: Left-handed
- Bowling: Right-arm medium
- Role: Batter
- Source: ESPNcricinfo, 16 February 2017

Ashan Randika (born 15 November 1993) is a Sri Lankan cricketer. He made his first-class debut for Sri Lanka Army Sports Club in the 2016–17 Premier League Tournament on 14 February 2017. He made his List A debut for Badulla District in the 2016–17 Districts One Day Tournament on 22 March 2017.

He made his Twenty20 debut for Sri Lanka Army Sports Club in the 2017–18 SLC Twenty20 Tournament on 24 February 2018. In February 2019, in the semi-finals of the 2018–19 SLC Twenty20 Tournament, Randika scored a century for Sri Lanka Army, despite being on the losing side against Moors Sports Club. In August 2021, he was named in the SLC Blues team for the 2021 SLC Invitational T20 League tournament. However, prior to the first match, he failed a fitness test.

In November 2021, he was selected to play for the Jaffna Kings following the players' draft for the 2021 Lanka Premier League. In July 2022, he was signed by the Jaffna Kings for the third edition of the Lanka Premier League.
