= Pabasara Waduge =

Sri Lankan cricketer (born 1993)

Personal information
- Full name: Dulan Pabasara Waduge Diminguwa
- Born: 10 July 1993 (age 33); Galle, Sri Lanka
- Source: ESPNcricinfo, 21 January 2017

Pabasara Waduge (born 10 July 1993) is a Sri Lankan cricketer. He made his first-class debut for Badureliya Sports Club in the 2012–13 Premier Trophy on 1 February 2013.

In March 2018, he was named in Galle's squad for the 2017–18 Super Four Provincial Tournament. In June 2022, he was named in the Sri Lanka A squad for their matches against Australia A during Australia's tour of Sri Lanka.
