= Santhush Gunathilake =

Sri Lankan cricketer (born 1999)

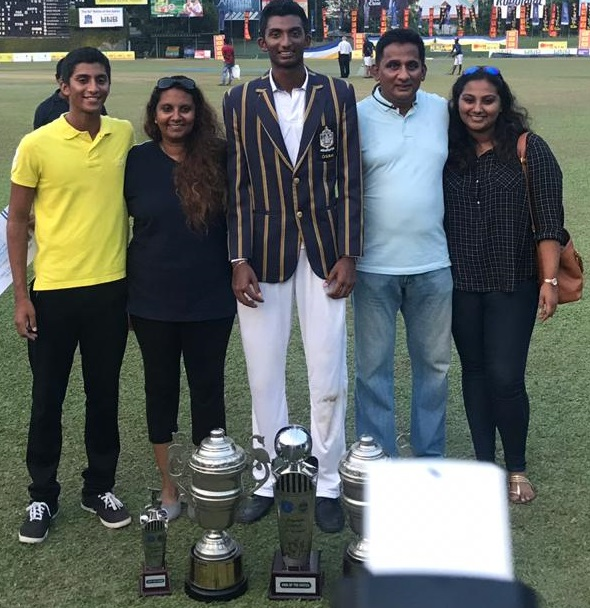

Personal information
- Full name: Santhush Nikhila Stephan Gunathilake
- Born: 14 September 1999 (age 27); Colombo, Sri Lanka
- Source: Cricinfo, 14 December 2020

Santhush Gunathilake (born 14 September 1999) is a Sri Lankan cricketer. He made his first-class debut for Ragama Cricket Club in the 2018–19 Premier League Tournament on 17 January 2019. Prior to his first-class debut, he was named in Sri Lanka's squad for the 2018 Under-19 Cricket World Cup. He made his List A debut on 15 December 2019, for Colts Cricket Club in the 2019–20 Invitation Limited Over Tournament.

In December 2020, Gunathilake was named in Sri Lanka's Test squad for their series against South Africa. He made his Twenty20 debut on 4 March 2021, for Colts Cricket Club in the 2020–21 SLC Twenty20 Tournament. In August 2021, he was named in the SLC Reds team for the 2021 SLC Invitational T20 League tournament. In April 2022, Sri Lanka Cricket (SLC) named him in the Sri Lanka Emerging Team's squad for their tour to England. In June 2022, he was named in the Sri Lanka A squad for their matches against Australia A during Australia's tour of Sri Lanka.
