= Rohitha Kottahachchi =

Sri Lankan cricketer (born 1971)

Personal information
- Born: 9 August 1971 (age 55); Kalutara, Sri Lanka

Umpiring information
- WODIs umpired: 7 (2008–2018)
- WT20Is umpired: 8 (2010–2018)
- Source: Cricinfo, 9 October 2015

Rohitha Kottahachchi (born 9 August 1971) is a Sri Lankan former first class cricketer. He is now an umpire, and stood in a tour match between Sri Lanka Board President's XI and West Indians in October 2015.
