= Sri Lanka Army Sports Club (cricket) =

Sri Lanka Army
- One Day name: Sri Lanka Army Sports Club

Personnel
- Captain: (Sri Lanka) Thisara Perera

Team information
- Home ground: Army Ground, Panagoda

History
- Premier Trophy wins: none
- Premier Limited Overs Tournament wins: none
- Twenty20 Tournament wins: none

Sri Lanka Army Sports Club is a first-class cricket team in Sri Lanka. It has competed in the Premier Trophy since 2006–07.

== History ==
As of late January 2016, Sri Lanka Army Sports Club had played 93 first-class matches, for 38 wins, 21 losses and 34 draws, and 68 List A matches, for 35 wins, 28 losses and 5 unfinished.

== Current squad ==
Players with international caps are listed in bold. Updated as on 2 August 2022.

Name	Age	Batting style	Bowling style	Notes
Batsmen
Lakshan Edirisinghe	32	Left-handed	Right-arm off-break	
Himasha Liyanage	29	Left-handed	Right-arm off-break	
Ashan Randika	31	Left-handed		
Thulina Dilshan	28	Right-handed	Right-arm leg-break	
**Thisara Perera**	36	Right-handed	Right-arm medium-fast	**List A and Twenty20 Captain**
Shehan Fernando	25	Left-handed		
All-rounders
**Asela Gunaratne**	39	Right-handed	Right-arm medium	**First-class Captain**
Suminda Lakshan	28	Right-handed	Right-arm leg-break	
Janith Silva	34	Right-handed	Right-arm medium-fast	
Wicket-keepers
Mahesh Kumara	26	Right-handed		
**Dinesh Chandimal**	35	Right-handed		
Spin Bowlers
**Seekkuge Prasanna**	40	Right-handed	Right-arm leg-break	
Gayan Bandara	35	Left-handed	Slow left-arm orthodox	
Pace Bowlers
Yashoda Mendis	33	Left-handed	Right-arm medium	
Heshan Hettiarachchi	26	Right-handed	Right-arm medium-fast	
Lakshan Gamage	24	Left-handed	Right-arm medium	
Asanka Manoj	28	Right-handed	Right-arm medium	
Rashmika Siriwardhana	27	Right-handed	Right-arm medium-fast	
