= 2017–18 Premier League Tournament =

Cricket tournament

- Dates: 8 December 2017 – 18 February 2018
- Administrator(s): Sri Lanka Cricket
- Cricket format: First-class cricket
- Tournament format(s): Round-robin then knockout
- Host(s): Sri Lanka
- Champions: Chilaw Marians Cricket Club (2nd title)
- Participants: 14
- Player of the series: Sachithra Serasinghe
- Most runs: Sachithra Serasinghe (901)
- Most wickets: Malinda Pushpakumara (70)

The 2017–18 Premier League Tournament was the 30th season of first-class cricket in Sri Lanka's Premier Trophy, with the matches played across three days each in the group stage. Chilaw Marians Cricket Club won the tournament, after finishing unbeaten in the Super Eight section of the competition.

The tournament started on 8 December 2017 and concluded on 18 February 2018, with fourteen teams competing, split into two groups of seven. The top four teams in each group progressed to the Super Eight part of the tournament, with those matches played across four days. The teams that did not qualify for the Super Eight round competed in the Plate Championships.

Galle Cricket Club finished with the fewest points in the previous tournament and were replaced by Sri Lanka Ports Authority Cricket Club for this edition of the competition, following their promotion from Tier B. Sinhalese Sports Club were the defending champions.

In December 2017, the match between Chilaw Marians Cricket Club and Burgher Recreation Club finished as a tie. In January 2018, the Plate League match between Bloomfield Cricket and Athletic Club and Sri Lanka Army Sports Club also finished as a tie. Chilaw Marians Cricket Club won the tournament, after remaining unbeaten throughout the competition. Bloomfield Cricket and Athletic Club finished bottom of the Plate Group and were relegated to Tier B.

Following the conclusion of the Premier League Tournament, the 2017–18 Super Four Provincial Tournament took place, featuring four teams based on the Centers of Excellence in Sri Lanka. In February 2019, Sri Lanka Cricket named Kaushal Silva as the tournament's Best Batsman, Chanaka Komasaru as the Best Bowler and Sachithra Serasinghe as the Player of the Tournament.

== Teams ==
The following teams competed:

Group A

- Bloomfield Cricket and Athletic Club
- Colombo Cricket Club
- Colts Cricket Club
- Moors Sports Club
- Ragama Cricket Club
- Saracens Sports Club
- Sinhalese Sports Club

Group B

- Badureliya Sports Club
- Burgher Recreation Club
- Chilaw Marians Cricket Club
- Nondescripts Cricket Club
- Sri Lanka Army Sports Club
- Sri Lanka Ports Authority Cricket Club
- Tamil Union Cricket and Athletic Club

== Points table ==
Group A

Team	Pld	W	L	D	T	Pts
Sinhalese Sports Club	6	1	0	5	0	71.17
Ragama Cricket Club	6	0	0	6	0	66.94
Colts Cricket Club	6	2	1	2	0	66.78
Saracens Sports Club	6	0	2	4	0	50.04
Colombo Cricket Club	6	1	0	5	0	46.77
Moors Sports Club	6	0	0	6	0	33.43
Bloomfield Cricket and Athletic Club	6	0	1	5	0	32.83

Team qualified for the Super Eight

Group B

Team	Pld	W	L	D	T	Pts
Chilaw Marians Cricket Club	6	5	0	0	1	101.45
Burgher Recreation Club	6	1	1	3	1	69.73
Nondescripts Cricket Club	6	3	3	0	0	63.34
Sri Lanka Ports Authority Cricket Club	6	2	3	1	0	58.52
Tamil Union Cricket and Athletic Club	6	1	2	3	0	57.78
Sri Lanka Army Sports Club	6	1	2	3	0	36.39
Badureliya Sports Club	6	1	3	2	0	35.58

Team qualified for the Super Eight

Super Eight

Team	Pld	W	L	D	T	Pts
Chilaw Marians Cricket Club	7	6	0	0	1	118.94
Sinhalese Sports Club	7	4	1	2	0	93.28
Sri Lanka Ports Authority Cricket Club	7	4	3	0	0	82.15
Burgher Recreation Club	7	3	3	0	1	74.07
Nondescripts Cricket Club	7	3	4	0	0	72.14
Colts Cricket Club	7	2	3	2	0	60.44
Ragama Cricket Club	7	1	3	3	0	53.63
Saracens Sports Club	7	0	6	1	0	31.91

Champions

Plate League

Team	Pld	W	L	D	T	Pts
Moors Sports Club	5	1	0	4	0	52.31
Badureliya Sports Club	5	1	0	4	0	48.34
Tamil Union Cricket and Athletic Club	5	0	0	5	0	46.48
Colombo Cricket Club	5	0	1	4	0	44.97
Sri Lanka Army Sports Club	5	1	2	1	1	40.87
Bloomfield Cricket and Athletic Club	5	0	0	4	1	36.86

Relegated to Tier B

== Group stage ==
=== Group A ===
==== Round 1 ====
8–10 December 2017
Scorecard

Ragama Cricket Club	v	Sinhalese Sports Club
187 (66.4 overs); Udara Jayasundera 71 (104); Jeffrey Vandersay 5/63 (19.4 overs)		307/6d (76 overs); Dasun Shanaka 114* (150); Amila Aponso 4/129 (33 overs)
156/5 (52 overs); Lahiru Milantha 61 (105); Charith Asalanka 3/26 (9 overs)

Match drawn
Welagedara Stadium, Kurunegala
Umpires: Chaminda Hathurusingha and Rohitha Kottahachchi

- Ragama Cricket Club won the toss and elected to bat.

8–10 December 2017
Scorecard

Colts Cricket Club	v	Bloomfield Cricket and Athletic Club
400 (148.5 overs); Hashan Dumindu 168* (306); Malith de Silva 5/105 (48 overs)		151 (54.3 overs); Nisal Francisco 33 (71); Prabath Jayasuriya 7/26 (18.3 overs)
		194 (56.5 overs) (f/o); Ramesh Mendis 52 (47); Prabath Jayasuriya 4/56 (22 overs)

Colts Cricket Club won by an innings and 55 runs
Colts Cricket Club Ground, Colombo
Umpires: Gamini Dissanayake and Deepal Gunawardene

- Bloomfield Cricket and Athletic Club won the toss and elected to field.
- Kavishka Anjula (Colts Cricket Club), Chandimanthu Rodrigo and Nipun Haggalla (Bloomfield Cricket and Athletic Club) all made their first-class debuts.

8–10 December 2017
Scorecard

Saracens Sports Club	v	Moors Sports Club
432 (102.3 overs); Andy Solomons 152 (169); Tharindu Ratnayake 5/156 (39.3 overs)		375 (103.2 overs); Primosh Perera 142 (184); Roshan Jayatissa 4/53 (16.2 overs)
208/7 (57 overs); Navindu Vithanage 70* (124); Shiran Fernando 2/21 (9 overs)

Match drawn
Moors Sports Club Ground, Colombo
Umpires: Hemantha Boteju and Asanga Jayasooriya

- Saracens Sports Club won the toss and elected to bat.

==== Round 2 ====
15–17 December 2017
Scorecard

Sinhalese Sports Club	v	Saracens Sports Club
444/4d (94 overs); Milinda Siriwardana 137* (178); Chathura Randunu 1/71 (12 overs)		238 (61 overs); Harsha Cooray 90* (146); Dhammika Prasad 4/66 (15 overs)
55/3 (6.4 overs); Shammu Ashan 31* (19); Saliya Saman 2/33 (3.4 overs)		258 (71.3 overs) (f/o); Promod Maduwantha 63 (113); Jeffrey Vandersay 4/72 (19 overs)

Sinhalese Sports Club won by 7 wickets
Sinhalese Sports Club Ground, Colombo
Umpires: Nilan De Silva and Deepal Gunawardene

- Saracens Sports Club won the toss and elected to field.

15–17 December 2017
Scorecard

Ragama Cricket Club	v	Colts Cricket Club
401/9d (106.1 overs); Sameera de Zoysa 86 (125); Nisala Tharaka 5/110 (24 overs)		190 (60.3 overs); Avishka Fernando 30 (35); Amila Aponso 4/47 (21.3 overs)
		73/2 (14 overs) (f/o); Priyamal Perera 37* (31); Janith Liyanage 1/7 (3 overs)

Match drawn
Colts Cricket Club Ground, Colombo
Umpires: Keerthi Bandara and Kapil Kottahachchi

- Ragama Cricket Club won the toss and elected to bat.

15–17 December 2017
Scorecard

Moors Sports Club	v	Colombo Cricket Club
444/4d (118.5 overs); Primosh Perera 121 (246); Lakshan Sandakan 2/100 (37 overs)		388 (101.4 overs); Kusal Mendis 177 (278); Tharindu Ratnayake 5/118 (33 overs)
26/1 (8 overs); Denuwan Rajakaruna 17 (16); Lahiru Gamage 1/6 (4 overs)

Match drawn
Colombo Cricket Club Ground, Colombo
Umpires: Susantha Dissanayake and Prageeth Rambukwella

- Colombo Cricket Club won the toss and elected to field.
- Kaveen Bandara and Manelker De Silva (Colombo Cricket Club) both made their first-class debuts.

==== Round 3 ====
22–24 December 2017
Scorecard

Bloomfield Cricket and Athletic Club	v	Sinhalese Sports Club
263 (83.4 overs); Lahiru Jayakody 86 (167); Sachithra Senanayake 7/82 (31.4 overs)		464/3d (96 overs); Kaushal Silva 202* (289); Nipun Karunanayake 2/59 (10 overs)
277/4 (74 overs); Nipun Karunanayake 122 (186); Sachithra Senanayake 2/79 (21 overs)

Match drawn
Bloomfield Cricket and Athletic Club Ground, Colombo
Umpires: Lyndon Hannibal and R P Massalage

- Sinhalese Sports Club won the toss and elected to field.

22–24 December 2017
Scorecard

Ragama Cricket Club	v	Saracens Sports Club
266 (77.4 overs); Janith Liyanage 130 (228); Mohomed Dilshad 5/75 (23 overs)		221 (63.4 overs); Harsha Cooray 52 (83); Sahan Nanayakkare 5/51 (13.4 overs)
211/8d (63.1 overs); Udara Jayasundera 97 (156); Roshan Jayatissa 3/64 (27 overs)		222/5 (30 overs); Ruvindu Gunasekera 70 (57); Janith Liyanage 1/28 (4 overs)

Match drawn
Thurstan College Ground, Colombo
Umpires: Mohan de Silva and Maurice Zilva

- Saracens Sports Club won the toss and elected to field.

22–24 December 2017
Scorecard

Colts Cricket Club	v	Colombo Cricket Club
89 (31.5 overs); Priyamal Perera 26 (32); Manelker De Silva 3/13 (5 overs)		385/9d (96.4 overs); Wanindu Hasaranga 120 (126); Kavishka Anjula 5/60 (16 overs)
138 (55 overs); Pasindu Lakshanka 45 (109); Wanindu Hasaranga 8/26 (11 overs)

Colombo Cricket Club won by an innings and 158 runs
Colombo Cricket Club Ground, Colombo
Umpires: Kitsiri Jayaweera and Ranjith Vishwakula

- Colombo Cricket Club won the toss and elected to field.

==== Round 4 ====
28–30 December 2017
Scorecard

Colombo Cricket Club	v	Sinhalese Sports Club
314 (80.5 overs); Ashan Priyanjan 84 (105); Akthab Cader 3/45 (10.5 overs)		459/8d (115 overs); Dimuth Karunaratne 141 (222); Sachith Pathirana 5/131 (28 overs)
233/5 (55 overs); Lasith Abeyratne 90 (78); Sachithra Senanayake 4/67 (23 overs)

Match drawn
Sinhalese Sports Club Ground, Colombo
Umpires: Hemantha Boteju and Palitha de Alwis

- Colombo Cricket Club won the toss and elected to bat.

28–30 December 2017
Scorecard

Moors Sports Club	v	Bloomfield Cricket and Athletic Club
163 (43.2 overs); Shanuka Dulaj 39 (59); Lahiru Samarakoon 4/56 (11.2 overs)		213 (68.3 overs); Nisal Francisco 61 (145); Sajeewa Weerakoon 6/58 (19.3 overs)
372/9d (80 overs); Chamara Silva 134 (142); Lahiru Samarakoon 4/72 (15 overs)		282/7 (73 overs); Ramesh Mendis 59* (105); Sajeewa Weerakoon 2/85 (20 overs)

Match drawn
Bloomfield Cricket and Athletic Club Ground, Colombo
Umpires: Sanjeewa Fernando and Vidura Prasad

- Bloomfield Cricket and Athletic Club won the toss and elected to field.

==== Round 5 ====
2–4 January 2018
Scorecard

Colts Cricket Club	v	Sinhalese Sports Club
267 (82.3 overs); Sangeeth Cooray 53 (116); Akash Senaratne 4/76 (25 overs)		200 (59.1 overs); Chamara Kapugedera 61 (88); Prabath Jayasuriya 4/63 (20.1 overs)
203 (79.5 overs); Priyamal Perera 87 (171); Sachithra Senanayake 4/50 (23.5 overs)		100/2 (34 overs); Dimuth Karunaratne 55* (108); Prabath Jayasuriya 2/44 (16 overs)

Match drawn
Colts Cricket Club Ground, Colombo
Umpires: Thilak Fernando and Asanga Jayasooriya

- Sinhalese Sports Club won the toss and elected to field.

5–7 January 2018
Scorecard

Colombo Cricket Club	v	Ragama Cricket Club
273 (62.1 overs); Lasith Abeyratne 96 (118); Nishan Peiris 3/55 (12 overs)		345 (101.2 overs); Lahiru Thirimanne 166 (258); Lahiru Madushanka 4/73 (21 overs)
237 (63 overs); Lahiru Madushanka 57 (131); Sahan Nanayakkare 6/102 (28 overs)		76/3 (23 overs); Udara Jayasundera 38 (58); Sachith Pathirana 2/27 (10 overs)

Match drawn
Colombo Cricket Club Ground, Colombo
Umpires: Rohitha Kottahachchi and R P Massalage

- Ragama Cricket Club won the toss and elected to field.

6–8 January 2018
Scorecard

Saracens Sports Club	v	Bloomfield Cricket and Athletic Club
320 (92.4 overs); Promod Maduwantha 86 (193); Lahiru Samarakoon 4/59 (17.4 overs)		293 (87 overs); Nipun Karunanayake 69 (106); Roshan Jayatissa 4/92 (29 overs)
182 (70.1 overs); Promod Maduwantha 59 (129); Malith de Silva 5/61 (29.1 overs)		73/1 (16 overs); Nipun Karunanayake 53* (59); Saliya Saman 1/18 (6 overs)

Match drawn
Bloomfield Cricket and Athletic Club Ground, Colombo
Umpires: Dilshan de Silva and Ravindra Kottahachchi

- Saracens Sports Club won the toss and elected to bat.

7–9 January 2018
Scorecard

Colts Cricket Club	v	Moors Sports Club
463 (115.2 overs); Sangeeth Cooray 200 (302); Nilanka Sandakan 8/184 (48 overs)		289 (85.5 overs); Chamara Silva 98 (92); Prabath Jayasuriya 5/117 (38 overs)
269/3 (53 overs); Pasindu Lakshanka 100* (147); Nilanka Sandakan 3/128 (18 overs)

Match drawn
Moors Sports Club Ground, Colombo
Umpires: Asanga Jayasooriya and Ranjith Vishwakula

- Colts Cricket Club won the toss and elected to bat.
- Charitha Kumarasinghe (Moors Sports Club) made his first-class debut.

==== Round 6 ====
12–14 January 2018
Scorecard

Colts Cricket Club	v	Saracens Sports Club
246 (79.3 overs); Priyamal Perera 92 (169); Roshan Jayatissa 5/51 (16.3 overs)		152 (55 overs); Promod Maduwantha 38 (150); Kavishka Anjula 4/38 (11 overs)
277 (85.5 overs); Dilruwan Perera 52 (80); Chathura Randunu 5/107 (27.5 overs)		145 (44.1 overs); Thanuka Dabare 52 (70); Dilruwan Perera 5/46 (17 overs)

Colts Cricket Club won by 226 runs
Colts Cricket Club Ground, Colombo
Umpires: Ranganath Prasanna and Raveendra Wimalasiri

- Colts Cricket Club won the toss and elected to bat.
- Thanuka Dabare (Saracens Sports Club) made his first-class debut.

12–14 January 2018
Scorecard

Ragama Cricket Club	v	Moors Sports Club
380 (83 overs); Lahiru Milantha 112 (139); Tharindu Ratnayake 3/93 (22 overs)		241 (60 overs); Chamara Silva 121 (135); Amila Aponso 6/79 (24 overs)
317/5d (70 overs); Lahiru Milantha 150* (159); Nilanka Sandakan 3/103 (22)		132/7 (36 overs); Pabasara Waduge 69 (103); Sahan Nanayakkare 3/42 (8 overs)

Match drawn
Moors Sports Club Ground, Colombo
Umpires: Nilan De Silva and Kapil Kottahachchi

- Ragama Cricket Club won the toss and elected to bat.

12–14 January 2018
Scorecard

Colombo Cricket Club	v	Bloomfield Cricket and Athletic Club
445 (90.3 overs); Sachith Pathirana 168 (118); Malith de Silva 5/116 (27.3 overs)		334 (100.3 overs); Pramud Hettiwatte 78 (103); Sachith Pathirana 4/91 (22.3 overs)
310/8 (58.2 overs); Kaveen Bandara 85 (104); Lahiru Samarakoon 4/75 (13.2 overs)

Match drawn
Bloomfield Cricket and Athletic Club Ground, Colombo
Umpires: Gamini Dissanayake and Pradeep Udawatta

- Bloomfield Cricket and Athletic Club won the toss and elected to field.

==== Round 7 ====
19–21 January 2018
Scorecard

Sinhalese Sports Club	v	Moors Sports Club
199 (52.1 overs); Dasun Shanaka 75 (93); Tharindu Ratnayake 5/71 (20.1 overs)		160 (48 overs); Chamara Silva 32 (24); Sachithra Senanayake 4/40 (16 overs)
563 (112.1 overs); Kaushal Silva 142 (175); Tharindu Ratnayake 4/184 (40.1 overs)		164/5 (41 overs); Pabasara Waduge 64 (108); Sachithra Senanayake 2/27 (8 overs)

Match drawn
Sinhalese Sports Club Ground, Colombo
Umpires: Keerthi Bandara and Raveendra Wimalasiri

- Sinhalese Sports Club won the toss and elected to bat.

19–21 January 2018
Scorecard

Ragama Cricket Club	v	Bloomfield Cricket and Athletic Club
320 (93.2 overs); Lahiru Thirimanne 62 (100); Kasun Rajitha 4/81 (24.2 overs)		273 (63.5 overs); Lahiru Samarakoon 53* (42); Nishan Peiris 4/97 (21 overs)
327/7 (109 overs); Roshen Silva 106* (178); Malith de Silva 3/74 (32 overs)

Match drawn
Bloomfield Cricket and Athletic Club Ground, Colombo
Umpires: Nilan De Silva and Rohitha Kottahachchi

- Ragama Cricket Club won the toss and elected to bat.

19–21 January 2018
Scorecard

Saracens Sports Club	v	Colombo Cricket Club
496 (127.2 overs); Harsha Cooray 140 (207); Sachith Pathirana 4/95 (37.2 overs)		372 (128.3 overs); Ashan Priyanjan 101 (127); Roshan Jayatissa 4/100 (32 overs)

Match drawn
Colombo Cricket Club Ground, Colombo
Umpires: Gamini Dissanayake and Prageeth Rambukwella

- Colombo Cricket Club won the toss and elected to field.

=== Group B ===
==== Round 1 ====
8–10 December 2017
Scorecard

Chilaw Marians Cricket Club	v	Nondescripts Cricket Club
206 (53 overs); Kasun Vidura 50 (103); Lasith Ambuldeniya 5/66 (19 overs)		128 (39.5 overs); Mahela Udawatte 46 (74); Sachithra Serasinghe 3/21 (9 overs)
132 (20.2 overs); Thikshila de Silva 37 (30); Lasith Ambuldeniya 5/57 (10.2 overs)		116 (28 overs); Sandun Weerakkody 32 (31); Malinda Pushpakumara 5/25 (10 overs)

Chilaw Marians Cricket Club won by 94 runs
FTZ Sports Complex, Katunayake
Umpires: Lyndon Hannibal and Pradeep Udawatta

- Chilaw Marians Cricket Club won the toss and elected to bat.
- Dasun Senevirathna (Chilaw Marians Cricket Club) and Malinga Amarasinghe (Nondescripts Cricket Club) both made their first-class debuts.

8–10 December 2017
Scorecard

Tamil Union Cricket and Athletic Club	v	Badureliya Sports Club
332 (93.1 overs); Manoj Sarathchandra 119* (167); Alankara Asanka Silva 5/106 (37 overs)		196 (64.1 overs); Pathum Nissanka 100 (167); Ramith Rambukwella 6/40 (19 overs)
182/5d (48.4 overs); Dineth Thimodya 68 (122); Dilesh Gunaratne 2/55 (10.4 overs)		167/6 (52 overs); Dilhan Cooray 55 (83); Ramith Rambukwella 2/62 (22 overs)

Match drawn
Surrey Village, Maggona
Umpires: Sanjeewa Fernando and Ravindra Kottahachchi

- Badureliya Sports Club won the toss and elected to field.
- Thilanga Udeshana (Tamil Union Cricket and Athletic Club) made his first-class debut.

8–10 December 2017
Scorecard

Burgher Recreation Club	v	Sri Lanka Ports Authority Cricket Club
187 (65.5 overs); Vikum Sanjaya 51 (34); Chanaka Komasaru 3/40 (15 overs)		192 (65.3 overs); Yohan de Silva 103 (201); Chamikara Edirisinghe 3/40 (13 overs)
126 (48.3 overs); Lasith Lakshan 48 (92); Maduka Liyanapathiranage 4/18 (8 overs)		86 (38.5 overs); Yashodha Lanka 24 (48); Tillakaratne Sampath 3/18 (8.5 overs)

Burgher Recreation Club won by 35 runs
Burgher Recreation Club Ground, Colombo
Umpires: Kumar Dharmasena and Upul Wewage

- Himesh Ramanayake (Burgher Recreation Club) made his first-class debut.

==== Round 2 ====
15–17 December 2017
Scorecard

Chilaw Marians Cricket Club	v	Burgher Recreation Club
293 (87.2 overs); Sachithra Serasinghe 63 (102); Suraj Randiv 6/90 (26 overs)		316 (81.1 overs); Rumesh Buddika 123 (149); Malinda Pushpakumara 5/102 (32 overs)
117 (43.4 overs); Sachithra Serasinghe 53 (87); Himesh Ramanayake 5/34 (12.4 overs)		94 (43.1 overs); Harsha Vithana 35* (102); Malinda Pushpakumara 5/51 (22 overs)

Match tied
FTZ Sports Complex, Katunayake
Umpires: Rohitha Kottahachchi and Suranga Perera

- Chilaw Marians Cricket Club won the toss and elected to bat.

15–17 December 2017
Scorecard

Tamil Union Cricket and Athletic Club	v	Nondescripts Cricket Club
117 (38.3 overs); Manoj Sarathchandra 33 (58); Chamika Karunaratne 2/19 (7 overs)		234 (75 overs); Lahiru Udara 45 (78); Pramod Madushan 5/69 (21 overs)
221 (67.1 overs); Dineth Thimodya 71 (135); Lasith Ambuldeniya 5/55 (17.1 overs)		105/0 (10.5 overs); Sandun Weerakkody 52* (32)

Nondescripts Cricket Club won by 10 wickets
Nondescripts Cricket Club Ground, Colombo
Umpires: Thilak Fernando and Chaminda Hathurusingha

- Nondescripts Cricket Club won the toss and elected to field.
- Ravindu Kodituwakku (Tamil Union Cricket and Athletic Club) made his first-class debut.

15–17 December 2017
Scorecard

Sri Lanka Army Sports Club	v	Sri Lanka Ports Authority Cricket Club
224 (98 overs); Leo Fransisco 57 (78); Chanaka Komasaru 3/28 (20 overs)		272 (85.3 overs); Yohan de Silva 76 (180); Nuwan Liyanapathirana 3/72 (18 overs)
143/5 (43 overs); Kasun de Silva 46* (70); Ranesh Perera 1/10 (3 overs)

Match drawn
Army Ground, Panagoda
Umpires: Lyndon Hannibal and Ranganath Prasanna

- Sri Lanka Ports Authority Cricket Club won the toss and elected to field.
- Tharindu Dharsana and Malka Madusanka (Sri Lanka Army Sports Club) both made their first-class debuts.

==== Round 3 ====
22–24 December 2017
Scorecard

Burgher Recreation Club	v	Nondescripts Cricket Club
244 (77.4 overs); Deshan Dias 105 (180); Lasith Ambuldeniya 6/59 (21.4 overs)		322 (64.1 overs); Angelo Perera 104 (94); Suraj Randiv 3/83 (15.1 overs)
180 (56.2 overs); Lisula Lakshan 80 (162); Lasith Ambuldeniya 4/70 (21 overs)		103/5 (23.1 overs); Mahela Udawatte 50 (63); Tillakaratne Sampath 2/39 (9 overs)

Nondescripts Cricket Club won by 5 wickets
Nondescripts Cricket Club Ground, Colombo

- Nondescripts Cricket Club won the toss and elected to field.

22–24 December 2017
Scorecard

Sri Lanka Army Sports Club	v	Tamil Union Cricket and Athletic Club
331 (111.2 overs); Lakshitha Madushan 87 (176); Damitha Silva 5/82 (31.2 overs)		435/9d (114.5 overs); Manoj Sarathchandra 119* (183); Nuwan Liyanapathirana 3/75 (21.5 overs)
170/5 (45 overs); Navod Ilukwatta 69 (98); Jeevan Mendis 2/41 (16 overs)

Match drawn
Army Ground, Panagoda
Umpires: Krishantha Rodrigo and Raveendra Wimalasiri

==== Round 4 ====
28–30 December 2017
Scorecard

Chilaw Marians Cricket Club	v	Sri Lanka Army Sports Club
545 (118.3 overs); Oshada Fernando 196 (279); Janith Silva 5/114 (29 overs)		160 (49 overs); Sanjika Ridma 35* (86); Malinda Pushpakumara 6/56 (17 overs)
		188 (62.1 overs) (f/o); Dilshan de Soysa 62 (147); Thikshila de Silva 3/19 (5 overs)

Chilaw Marians Cricket Club won by an innings and 197 runs
FTZ Sports Complex, Katunayake
Umpires: Gamini Dissanayake

- Chilaw Marians Cricket Club won the toss and elected to bat.

28–30 December 2017
Scorecard

Tamil Union Cricket and Athletic Club	v	Burgher Recreation Club
314 (104 overs); Tharanga Paranavitana 123 (276); Vikum Sanjaya 3/63 (18 overs)		332 (106.5 overs); Suraj Randiv 152* (277); Pramod Madushan 5/85 (26.5 overs)
234/5 (53 overs); Jeevan Mendis 100* (101); Tillakaratne Sampath 2/68 (14 overs)

Match drawn
P Sara Oval, Colombo
Umpires: Prageeth Rambukwella and Ranganath Prasanna

- Burgher Recreation Club won the toss and elected to field.

28–30 December 2017
Scorecard

Sri Lanka Ports Authority Cricket Club	v	Badureliya Sports Club
359 (100.3 overs); Maduka Liyanapathiranage 115* (209); Alankara Asanka Silva 7/79 (32 overs)		105 (56 overs); Sammika Ruwan 20 (76); Chanaka Komasaru 6/34 (22 overs)
		115 (58.5 overs) (f/o); Sanjaya Chathuranga 31 (52); Chanaka Komasaru 6/39 (26.5 overs)

Sri Lanka Ports Authority Cricket Club won by an innings and 139 runs
Surrey Village, Maggona
Umpires: Nilantha Bopage and Rohitha Kottahachchi

- Sri Lanka Ports Authority Cricket Club won the toss and elected to bat.
- Ramesh Nimantha (Sri Lanka Ports Authority Cricket Club) made his first-class debut.

==== Round 5 ====
2–4 January 2018
Scorecard

Chilaw Marians Cricket Club	v	Badureliya Sports Club
371 (85.2 overs); Sachithra Serasinghe 103 (138); Alankara Asanka Silva 5/74 (22.2 overs)		162 (47.3 overs); Pathum Nissanka 42 (85); Malinda Pushpakumara 5/40 (18 overs)
267/3d (58 overs); Oshada Fernando 103* (146); Duvindu Tillakaratne 1/59 (20 overs)		156 (52.1 overs); Pathum Nissanka 50 (80); Asitha Fernando 3/22 (10 overs)

Chilaw Marians Cricket Club won by 320 runs
FTZ Sports Complex, Katunayake
Umpires: Saman Mohan de Silva and Sisira Kumara Perera

- Chilaw Marians Cricket Club won the toss and elected to bat.

5–7 January 2018
Scorecard

Nondescripts Cricket Club	v	Sri Lanka Army Sports Club
224 (59.2 overs); Angelo Perera 80 (99); Nuwan Liyanapathirana 3/40 (15 overs)		369 (106.1 overs); Dilshan de Soysa 97* (208); Lasith Ambuldeniya 3/105 (36 overs)
235 (71 overs); Mahela Udawatte 52 (102); Dushan Vimukthi 9/108 (31 overs)		94/4 (19.4 overs); Janaka Sampath 50* (42); Lasith Ambuldeniya 2/36 (8.4 overs)

Sri Lanka Army Sports Club won by 6 wickets
Army Ground, Panagoda
Umpires: Keerthi Bandara and Vidura Prasad

- Nondescripts Cricket Club won the toss and elected to bat.

5–7 January 2018
Scorecard

Tamil Union Cricket and Athletic Club	v	Sri Lanka Ports Authority Cricket Club
120 (44.5 overs); Jeevan Mendis 32 (70); Akalanka Ganegama 5/35 (16 overs)		233 (54.2 overs); Gihan Rupasinghe 89 (81); Dinuk Wikramanayaka 6/42 (15 overs)
384/6d (95 overs); Manoj Sarathchandra 102* (166); Maduka Liyanapathiranage 3/86 (25 overs)		145 (48 overs); Prashan Wickramasinghe 53 (104); Dinuk Wikramanayaka 4/22 (13 overs)

Tamil Union Cricket and Athletic Club won by 126 runs
FTZ Sports Complex, Katunayake
Umpires: Deepal Gunawardene and Nilantha Semasinghe

- Sri Lanka Ports Authority Cricket Club won the toss and elected to field.

6–8 January 2018
Scorecard

Burgher Recreation Club	v	Badureliya Sports Club
134 (34.4 overs); Tillakaratne Sampath 30 (34); Alankara Asanka Silva 5/45 (13 overs)		133 (57.2 overs); Pathum Nissanka 41 (65); Chamikara Edirisinghe 5/20 (18 overs)
346 (96.2 overs); Shashin Dilranga 97 (190); Dilesh Gunaratne 3/69 (21 overs)		313/9 (74 overs); Shiran Ratnayake 100* (156); Himesh Ramanayake 3/45 (12 overs)

Match drawn
Burgher Recreation Club Ground, Colombo
Umpires: Nilantha Bopage and Chaminda Hathurusingha

- Burgher Recreation Club won the toss and elected to bat.
- Nadras Prasad (Badureliya Sports Club) and Raminda Wijesooriya (Burgher Recreation Club) both made their first-class debuts.

==== Round 6 ====
12–14 January 2018
Scorecard

Tamil Union Cricket and Athletic Club	v	Chilaw Marians Cricket Club
305 (81.2 overs); Dhananjaya de Silva 72 (76); Asitha Fernando 4/51 (17.2 overs)		296 (67.1 overs); Oshada Fernando 65 (77); Rangana Herath 3/62 (19 overs)
197 (58.1 overs); Manoj Sarathchandra 63 (119); Malinda Pushpakumara 4/86 (19.1 overs)		207/4 (31.4 overs); Oshada Fernando 88* (92); Rangana Herath 2/51 (6 overs)

Chilaw Marians Cricket Club won by 6 wickets
P Sara Oval, Colombo
Umpires: Keerthi Bandara and Prageeth Rambukwella

- Tamil Union Cricket and Athletic Club won the toss and elected to bat.
- Yohan Mendis (Tamil Union Cricket and Athletic Club) made his first-class debut.

12–14 January 2018
Scorecard

Nondescripts Cricket Club	v	Sri Lanka Ports Authority Cricket Club
220 (55.1 overs); Mahela Udawatte 54 (72); Maduka Liyanapathiranage 5/52 (13.1 overs)		121 (40.5 overs); Akalanka Ganegama 24* (24); Lasith Ambuldeniya 2/28 (9.5 overs)
120 (30.5 overs); Sachintha Peiris 27* (24); Chanaka Komasaru 7/49 (15.5 overs)		220/6 (76.1 overs); Ishan Rangana 51 (145); Lahiru Kumara 2/35 (12 overs)

Sri Lanka Ports Authority Cricket Club won by 4 wickets
FTZ Sports Complex, Katunayake
Umpires: Susantha Dissanayake and Rohitha Kottahachchi

- Nondescripts Cricket Club won the toss and elected to bat.

12–14 January 2018
Scorecard

Sri Lanka Army Sports Club	v	Badureliya Sports Club
152 (51 overs); Ashan Randika 30 (37); Nadras Prasad 5/41 (12 overs)		248 (82 overs); Sanjaya Chathuranga 69* (116); Malka Madusanka 5/41 (13 overs)
221 (65 overs); Dushan Vimukthi 46 (107); Alankara Asanka Silva 4/91 (31 overs)		126/4 (39.2 overs); Pathum Nissanka 60* (129); Malka Madusanka 2/37 (14 overs)

Badureliya Sports Club won by 6 wickets
Surrey Village, Maggona
Umpires: Hemantha Boteju and Deepal Gunawardene

- Sri Lanka Army Sports Club won the toss and elected to bat.

==== Round 7 ====
19–21 January 2018
Scorecard

Chilaw Marians Cricket Club	v	Sri Lanka Ports Authority Cricket Club
427 (117.4 overs); Ashen Silva 168* (355); Chanaka Komasaru 6/139 (51.4 overs)		135 (32.2 overs); Gayan Maneeshan 49 (78); Asitha Fernando 5/34 (9.2 overs)
		108 (25.3 overs) (f/o); Nisal Randika 23 (32); Malinda Pushpakumara 4/33 (11 overs)

Chilaw Marians Cricket Club won by an innings and 184 runs
Colts Cricket Club Ground, Colombo
Umpires: Asanga Jayasooriya and Krishantha Rodrigo

- Chilaw Marians Cricket Club won the toss and elected to bat.
- Irosh Fernando (Chilaw Marians Cricket Club) made his first-class debut.

19–21 January 2018
Scorecard

Badureliya Sports Club	v	Nondescripts Cricket Club
194 (72.4 overs); Salinda Ushan 34 (95); Chaturanga de Silva 3/28 (17 overs)		313 (89.1 overs); Angelo Perera 89 (183); Alankara Asanka Silva 3/43 (16.1 overs)
160 (54.4 overs); Subramanian Anand 62 (104); Chaturanga de Silva 4/44 (16.4 overs)		45/0 (4.4 overs); Lahiru Udara 39* (21)

Nondescripts Cricket Club won by 10 wickets
Nondescripts Cricket Club Ground, Colombo
Umpires: Ravindra Kottahachchi and Pradeep Udawatta

19–21 January 2018
Scorecard

Sri Lanka Army Sports Club	v	Burgher Recreation Club
232 (65.3 overs); Dilshan de Soysa 50 (148); Tillakaratne Sampath 4/40 (14.3 overs)		345 (84.4 overs); Rumesh Buddika 114 (136); Dushan Vimukthi 5/68 (23.4 overs)
454/9 (115 overs); Lakshitha Madushan 151* (202); Himesh Ramanayake 3/56 (15 overs)

Match drawn
Burgher Recreation Club Ground, Colombo
Umpires: Hemantha Boteju and Lyndon Hannibal

== Plate League ==
26–28 January 2018
Scorecard

Colombo Cricket Club	v	Badureliya Sports Club
480/5d (110 overs); Madawa Warnapura 138* (233); Alankara Asanka Silva 2/85 (28 overs)		449 (155.2 overs); Salinda Ushan 154 (374); Ashan Priyanjan 5/87 (28 overs)
41/0 (4 overs); Malindu Maduranga 27* (16)

Match drawn
Bloomfield Cricket and Athletic Club Ground, Colombo
Umpires: Susantha Dissanayake and Kapil Kottahachchi

- Colombo Cricket Club won the toss and elected to bat.

26–28 January 2018
Scorecard

Moors Sports Club	v	Tamil Union Cricket and Athletic Club
260 (67.4 overs); Shanuka Dulaj 82 (111); Pramod Madushan 4/53 (12.4 overs)		243 (65.5 overs); Binura Fernando 56 (102); Tharindu Ratnayake 5/85 (22.5 overs)
325 (93.5 overs); Irosh Samarasooriya 113 (186); Pramod Madushan 4/98 (23.5 overs)		185/6 (35 overs); Sithara Gimhan 81 (76); Tharindu Ratnayake 3/67 (13 overs)

Match drawn
Burgher Recreation Club Ground, Colombo
Umpires: Hemantha Boteju and Krishantha Rodrigo

- Tamil Union Cricket and Athletic Club won the toss and elected to field.
- Umesh Kasun (Moors Sports Club) made his first-class debut.

26–28 January 2018
Scorecard

Bloomfield Cricket and Athletic Club	v	Sri Lanka Army Sports Club
163 (38.3 overs); Adeesha Nanayakkara 35 (54); Dushan Vimukthi 6/77 (16.3 overs)		171 (52.2 overs); Ajantha Mendis 37 (53); Malith de Silva 5/69 (21.2 overs)
206 (60 overs); Nipun Karunanayake 91 (124); Dushan Vimukthi 4/50 (15 overs)		198 (68 overs); Lakshitha Madushan 58 (144); Malith de Silva 4/61 (28 overs)

Match tied
Moors Sports Club Ground, Colombo
Umpires: Keerthi Bandara and Vidura Prasad

- Sri Lanka Army Sports Club won the toss and elected to field.

1–3 February 2018
Scorecard

Colombo Cricket Club	v	Sri Lanka Army Sports Club
333 (79.4 overs); Lasith Abeyratne 109 (142); Dushan Vimukthi 5/66 (17 overs)		265 (76 overs); Dilshan de Soysa 62 (141); Sachith Pathirana 7/76 (24 overs)
120 (32.3 overs); Wanindu Hasaranga 35 (31); Seekkuge Prasanna 5/45 (12 overs)		189/8 (44.1 overs); Seekkuge Prasanna 63 (29); Sachith Pathirana 4/110 (15 overs)

Sri Lanka Army won by 2 wickets
Burgher Recreation Club Ground, Colombo
Umpires: Nilan De Silva and Asanga Jayasooriya

- Sri Lanka Army won the toss and elected to field.

1–3 February 2018
Scorecard

Moors Sports Club	v	Badureliya Sports Club
214 (49.1 overs); Tilaksha Sumanasiri 53 (58); Alankara Asanka Silva 4/51 (15.1 overs)		338 (113.5 overs); Salinda Ushan 97 (209); Nilanka Sandakan 4/79 (29 overs)
386/5d (80 overs); Chamara Silva 121* (108); Alankara Asanka Silva 2/125 (29 overs)		121/4 (29 overs); Pathum Nissanka 67* (88); Sajeewa Weerakoon 3/31 (13 overs)

Match drawn
Bloomfield Cricket and Athletic Club Ground, Colombo
Umpires: Sanjeewa Fernando and Ranganath Prasanna

- Moors Sports Club won the toss and elected to bat.

1–3 February 2018
Scorecard

Bloomfield Cricket and Athletic Club	v	Tamil Union Cricket and Athletic Club
323 (81.5 overs); Ramesh Mendis 137* (149); Jeevan Mendis 6/100 (26 overs)		336 (106.4 overs); Binura Fernando 82 (141); Malith de Silva 5/56 (24.4 overs)
301/8 (72 overs); Nisal Francisco 120 (186); Jeevan Mendis 4/123 (21 overs)

Match drawn
Moors Sports Club Ground, Colombo
Umpires: Gamini Dissanayake and Kapil Kottahachchi

- Bloomfield Cricket and Athletic Club won the toss and elected to bat.

7–9 February 2018
Scorecard

Tamil Union Cricket and Athletic Club	v	Colombo Cricket Club
197 (65.1 overs); Tharanga Paranavitana 69 (130); Dinuka Hettiarachchi 6/64 (25 overs)		442 (100.1 overs); Lasith Abeyratne 115 (102); Ramith Rambukwella 3/135 (35 overs)
251/5 (83.1 overs); Sithara Gimhan 69 (143); Dinuka Hettiarachchi 5/108 (35 overs)

Match drawn
Colts Cricket Club Ground, Colombo
Umpires: Kapil Kottahachchi and Maurice Zilva

- Tamil Union Cricket and Athletic Club won the toss and elected to bat.

7–9 February 2018
Scorecard

Moors Sports Club	v	Sri Lanka Army Sports Club
90 (29.2 overs); Primosh Perera 39 (78); Yasoda Mendis 4/32 (8 overs)		211 (55.4 overs); Leo Fransisco 58 (55); Chanuk Dilshan 5/75 (21 overs)
314 (83.5 overs); Chamara Silva 93 (87); Malka Madusanka 4/82 (22.5 overs)		172 (46.2 overs); Seekkuge Prasanna 51 (37); Kosala Kulasekara 4/47 (11.2 overs)

Moors Sports Club won by 21 runs
Burgher Recreation Club Ground, Colombo
Umpires: Dilshan de Silva and Rohitha Kottahachchi

- Moors Sports Club won the toss and elected to bat.
- Chanuk Dilshan (Moors Sports Club) made his first-class debut.

7–9 February 2018
Scorecard

Bloomfield Cricket and Athletic Club	v	Badureliya Sports Club
173 (51 overs); Nisal Francisco 35 (82); Savith Priyan 4/69 (15 overs)		423/9d (156 overs); Nadeera Nawela 124 (303); Malith de Silva 4/77 (39 overs)
295/4 (68 overs); Anuk Fernando 102* (131); Alankara Asanka Silva 2/91 (28 overs)

Match drawn
Moors Sports Club Ground, Colombo
Umpires: Ravindra Kottahachchi and Krishantha Rodrigo

- Bloomfield Cricket and Athletic Club won the toss and elected to bat.

== Super Eight ==
25–28 January 2018
Scorecard

Sri Lanka Ports Authority Cricket Club	v	Sinhalese Sports Club
165 (44.2 overs); Gihan Rupasinghe 36 (49); Dasun Shanaka 3/26 (7 overs)		413 (110.4 overs); Kaushal Silva 120 (159); Chanaka Komasaru 4/119 (45.4 overs)
166 (40.1 overs); Yashodha Lanka 67 (95); Sachithra Senanayake 3/11 (7.1 overs)

Sinhalese Sports Club won by an innings and 82 runs
P Sara Oval, Colombo
Umpires: Deepal Gunawardene and Prageeth Rambukwella

- Sri Lanka Ports Authority Cricket Club won the toss and elected to bat.

25–28 January 2018
Scorecard

Nondescripts Cricket Club	v	Ragama Cricket Club
247 (76.1 overs); Chaturanga de Silva 90 (129); Ishan Jayaratne 4/46 (15 overs)		337 (108.3 overs); Janith Liyanage 69 (178); Chamika Karunaratne 4/80 (21 overs)
215 (57.1 overs); Chamika Karunaratne 51 (63); Nishan Peiris 5/56 (17.1 overs)		129/5 (40.1 overs); Janith Liyanage 44* (79); Tharindu Kaushal 3/33 (10 overs)

Ragama Cricket Club won by 5 wickets
Colts Cricket Club Ground, Colombo
Umpires: Nilan De Silva and Raveendra Wimalasiri

- Nondescripts Cricket Club won the toss and elected to bat.

25–28 January 2018
Scorecard

Burgher Recreation Club	v	Colts Cricket Club
310 (90.2 overs); Shashin Dilranga 124 (193); Nisala Tharaka 6/71 (19.2 overs)		231 (97.1 overs); Priyamal Perera 88 (200); Neranjana Wanniarachchi 4/38 (15 overs)
122 (38.4 overs); Lasith Lakshan 64 (79); Prabath Jayasuriya 4/15 (11.4 overs)		203/7 (62.3 overs); Sangeeth Cooray 39 (49); Suraj Randiv 5/72 (26 overs)

Colts Cricket Club won by 3 wickets
FTZ Sports Complex, Katunayake
Umpires: Rohitha Kottahachchi and Pradeep Udawatta

- Colts Cricket Club won the toss and elected to field.

25–28 January 2018
Scorecard

Chilaw Marians Cricket Club	v	Saracens Sports Club
401 (109.2 overs); Oshada Fernando 112 (180); Saliya Saman 5/76 (32 overs)		236 (65.5 overs); Gamindu Kanishka 43 (100); Asitha Fernando 5/47 (12.5 overs)
259/8d (56.3 overs); Sachithra Serasinghe 87 (120); Chathura Randunu 4/68 (11 overs)		180 (56.3 overs); Harsha Cooray 62 (74); Malinda Pushpakumara 6/73 (23 overs)

Chilaw Marians Cricket Club won by 244 runs
Sinhalese Sports Club Ground, Colombo
Umpires: Gamini Dissanayake and Ravindra Kottahachchi

- Saracens Sports Club won the toss and elected to field.

31 January–3 February 2018
Scorecard

Sinhalese Sports Club	v	Nondescripts Cricket Club
347 (93.1 overs); Milinda Siriwardana 70 (108); Lasith Ambuldeniya 5/81 (26 overs)		298 (82.2 overs); Angelo Perera 107 (168); Dhammika Prasad 4/37 (11.5 overs)
300 (85.1 overs); Minod Bhanuka 110 (157); Lasith Ambuldeniya 5/89 (28.1 overs)		155 (45.5 overs); Tharindu Kaushal 37 (72); Sachithra Senanayake 6/65 (22.5 overs)

Sinhalese Sports Club won by 194 runs
Colombo Cricket Club Ground, Colombo
Umpires: Deepal Gunawardene and Ruchira Palliyaguruge

- Nondescripts Cricket Club won the toss and elected to field.

31 January–3 February 2018
Scorecard

Ragama Cricket Club	v	Sri Lanka Ports Authority Cricket Club
269 (98 overs); Lahiru Thirimanne 52 (108); Chanaka Komasaru 5/66 (23 overs)		485/9d (154.3 overs); Gayan Maneeshan 139* (260); Amila Aponso 3/82 (43 overs)
174 (72.4 overs); Chathura Peiris 45 (106); Maduka Liyanapathiranage 5/85 (33 overs)

Sri Lanka Ports Authority Cricket Club won by an innings and 42 runs
FTZ Sports Complex, Katunayake
Umpires: Keerthi Bandara and Raveendra Wimalasiri

- Sri Lanka Ports Authority Cricket Club won the toss and elected to field.

31 January–3 February 2018
Scorecard

Colts Cricket Club	v	Chilaw Marians Cricket Club
169 (58 overs); Pasindu Lakshanka 37 (66); Malinda Pushpakumara 5/40 (18 overs)		162 (37.5 overs); Shehan Jayasuriya 50 (28); Prabath Jayasuriya 6/48 (12.5 overs)
225 (76 overs); Hashan Dumindu 57 (118); Isuru Udana 2/18 (9 overs)		234/6 (48.4 overs); Shehan Jayasuriya 95 (108); Mohamed Ali 2/34 (8 overs)

Chilaw Marians Cricket Club won by 4 wickets
Sinhalese Sports Club Ground, Colombo
Umpires: Ravindra Kottahachchi and Pradeep Udawatta

- Chilaw Marians Cricket Club won the toss and elected to field.

31 January–3 February 2018
Scorecard

Burgher Recreation Club	v	Saracens Sports Club
168 (57.3 overs); Vikum Sanjaya 34 (45); Ranitha Liyanarachchi 3/35 (12 overs)		173 (49.5 overs); Gamindu Kanishka 51 (85); Suraj Randiv 4/26 (10.5 overs)
294 (81.5 overs); Deshan Dias 72 (130); Sachithra Perera 6/87 (25 overs)		206 (64.4 overs); Minhaj Jalill 90* (145); Chamikara Edirisinghe 5/69 (22 overs)

Burgher Recreation Club won by 83 runs
Colts Cricket Club Ground, Colombo
Umpires: Hemantha Boteju and Lyndon Hannibal

- Saracens Sports Club won the toss and elected to field.

6–9 February 2018
Scorecard

Burgher Recreation Club	v	Sinhalese Sports Club
200 (63.4 overs); Harsha Vithana 77 (128); Akash Senaratne 5/52 (23 overs)		199 (62.4 overs); Kaushal Silva 42 (55); Hashen Ramanayake 6/18 (7.4 overs)
183 (76.2 overs); Hashen Ramanayake 36 (155); Akash Senaratne 4/36 (26 overs)		187/2 (39.5 overs); Kaushal Silva 85* (106); Rumesh Buddika 1/0 (1 over)

Sinhalese Sports Club won by 8 wickets
Galle International Stadium, Galle
Umpires: Gamini Dissanayake and Asanga Jayasooriya

- Burgher Recreation Club won the toss and elected to bat.

6–9 February 2018
Scorecard

Ragama Cricket Club	v	Chilaw Marians Cricket Club
57 (29.2 overs); Akshu Fernando 20 (26); Shehan Jayasuriya 7/22 (15 overs)		211 (52.3 overs); Shehan Jayasuriya 80 (90); Nishan Peiris 4/79 (19.3 overs)
148 (40.4 overs); Lahiru Thirimanne 39 (37); Sachithra Serasinghe 4/33 (9 overs)

Chilaw Marians Cricket Club won by an innings and 6 runs
P Sara Oval, Colombo
Umpires: Nilan De Silva and Lyndon Hannibal

- Ragama Cricket Club won the toss and elected to bat.

6–9 February 2018
Scorecard

Colts Cricket Club	v	Sri Lanka Ports Authority Cricket Club
92 (26.3 overs); Sahan Arachchige 19 (14); Chanaka Komasaru 5/38 (11.3 overs)		410/9d (113.5 overs); Nick Compton 98 (188); Prabath Jayasuriya 3/115 (33.5 overs)
184 (72.3 overs); Vishad Randika 67 (177); Chanaka Komasaru 5/80 (31 overs)

Sri Lanka Ports Authority Cricket Club won by an innings and 134 runs
Sinhalese Sports Club Ground, Colombo
Umpires: Ruchira Palliyaguruge and Prageeth Rambukwella

- Sri Lanka Ports Authority Cricket Club won the toss and elected to field.

6–9 February 2018
Scorecard

Nondescripts Cricket Club	v	Saracens Sports Club
284 (83 overs); Tharindu Kaushal 131 (205); Mohomed Dilshad 3/38 (12 overs)		132 (43.5 overs); Ranitha Liyanarachchi 37* (50); Chamika Karunaratne 4/38 (10.5 overs)
287/9d (61 overs); Chaturanga de Silva 79 (85); Roshan Jayatissa 4/58 (17 overs)		126 (40.3 overs); Navindu Vithanage 31 (70); Sachintha Peiris 6/49 (19 overs)

Nondescripts Cricket Club won by 313 runs
FTZ Sports Complex, Katunayake
Umpires: Hemantha Boteju and Ranmore Martinesz

- Nondescripts Cricket Club won the toss and elected to bat.
- Chanaka Devinda (Saracens Sports Club) made his first-class debut.

15–18 February 2018
Scorecard

Chilaw Marians Cricket Club	v	Sinhalese Sports Club
372 (103.5 overs); Shehan Jayasuriya 146 (159); Akthab Cader 4/79 (17 overs)		232 (66.2 overs); Shammu Ashan 72 (88); Shehan Jayasuriya 4/48 (15 overs)
399 (105.3 overs); Risith Upamal 88* (185); Akash Senaratne 4/72 (19.3 overs)		275 (72.2 overs); Shammu Ashan 83 (134); Shehan Jayasuriya 4/65 (21 overs)

Chilaw Marians Cricket Club won by 264 runs
Colombo Cricket Club Ground, Colombo
Umpires: Hemantha Boteju and Prageeth Rambukwella

- Sinhalese Sports Club won the toss and elected to field.
- Sheshan Fernando (Chilaw Marians Cricket Club) made his first-class debut.

15–18 February 2018
Scorecard

Ragama Cricket Club	v	Burgher Recreation Club
129 (47.5 overs); Akshu Fernando 41 (50); Himesh Ramanayake 5/29 (10.5 overs)		149 (57.4 overs); Hashen Ramanayake 38 (90); Ishan Jayaratne 4/54 (15.4 overs)
138 (41.3 overs); Lahiru Milantha 37 (39); Suraj Randiv 5/8 (7.3 overs)		119/2 (19.5 overs); Tillakaratne Sampath 50* (43); Nishan Peiris 1/27 (6 overs)

Burgher Recreation Club won by 8 wickets
FTZ Sports Complex, Katunayake
Umpires: Susantha Dissanayake and Lyndon Hannibal

- Ragama Cricket Club won the toss and elected to bat.

15–18 February 2018
Scorecard

Colts Cricket Club	v	Nondescripts Cricket Club
127 (35.1 overs); Nisala Tharaka 25 (62); Lasith Ambuldeniya 5/33 (12.1 overs)		618/9d (121.4 overs); Lahiru Udara 157 (229); Prabath Jayasuriya 4/224 (44.4 overs)
348 (111.4 overs); Sahan Arachchige 116 (234); Sachintha Peiris 5/65 (28 overs)

Nondescripts Cricket Club won by an innings and 143 runs
Galle International Stadium, Galle
Umpires: Deepal Gunawardene and Raveendra Wimalasiri

- Colts Cricket Club won the toss and elected to bat.

15–18 February 2018
Scorecard

Saracens Sports Club	v	Sri Lanka Ports Authority Cricket Club
311 (111 overs); Ashen Bandara 87* (175); Charith Jayampathi 3/43 (13 overs)		220 (58.2 overs); Nick Compton 103 (140); Mohomed Dilshad 4/51 (11 overs)
118 (39.2 overs); Ranitha Liyanarachchi 34 (33); Charith Jayampathi 5/33 (10.2 overs)		213/4 (55.3 overs); Nick Compton 95 (116); Mohomed Dilshad 1/48 (17 overs)

Sri Lanka Ports Authority Cricket Club won by 6 wickets
Sinhalese Sports Club Ground, Colombo
Umpires: Ranmore Martinesz and Pradeep Udawatta

- Sri Lanka Ports Authority Cricket Club won the toss and elected to field.
- Ashen Bandara (Saracens Sports Club) made his first-class debut.

== See also ==
- 2017–18 Premier League Tournament Tier B
- List of tied first-class cricket matches
