= 2018 SLC T20 League =

Cricket tournament

- Dates: 21 August – 2 September 2018
- Administrator: Sri Lanka Cricket
- Cricket format: Twenty20
- Tournament format(s): Round-robin and Final
- Champions: Team Colombo
- Participants: 4
- Matches: 13
- Most runs: Upul Tharanga (CMB) (414)
- Most wickets: Kasun Rajitha (GLL) (13)

The 2018 SLC T20 League was a domestic Twenty20 cricket tournament that was held in Sri Lanka, between 21 August and 2 September 2018. Four teams took part in the tournament: Colombo, Dambulla, Galle and Kandy. The Rangiri Dambulla International Stadium, Pallekele International Cricket Stadium and the R. Premadasa Stadium hosted all the matches.

The third match, between Colombo and Kandy, finished as a tie, therefore going to a Super Over to determine the winner. However, the match was still tied after the Super Over, with both teams scoring five runs each. Colombo were declared the eventual winners, as they had scored the most boundaries.

Colombo were the first team to qualify for the final, after remaining unbeaten in their first four matches. They were joined in the final by Dambulla, who finished second in the group stage. Colombo won the final by 7 wickets, with Upul Tharanga scoring an unbeaten century.

== Squads ==
The following teams and squads were named to compete in the tournament:

Team Colombo	Team Dambulla	Team Galle	Team Kandy
Dinesh Chandimal (c); Upul Tharanga (vc); Mahela Udawatte; Akila Dananjaya; Shehan Jayasuriya; Chathuranga De Silva; Shammu Ashan; Sachithra Serasinghe; Avishka Fernando; Priyamal Perera; Jeewan Mendis; Kamindu Mendis; Lasith Abeyrathne; Nuwan Pradeep; Asitha Fernando; Vishva Chathuranga; Lasith Embuldeniya; Lahiru Madushanka; Ashen Bandara; Rashmika Dilshan; Nimsara Attanagalle	Thisara Perera (c); Dilruwan Perera (vc); Danushka Gunathilaka; Sadeera Samarawickrama; Ashan Priyanjan; Lakshan Sandakan; Amila Aponso; Wanindu Hasaranga; Ramith Rambukwella; Isuru Udana; Vikum Sanjaya; Minod Bhanuka; Ruvindu Gunasekara; Ramesh Mendis; Binura Fernando; Kevin Koththigoda; Shehan Madushanka; Dilesh Gunarathne; Irosh Samarasuriya; Nuwanidu Fernando; Nipun Karunanayake	Suranga Lakmal (c); Dimuth Karunarathne (vc); Kusal Mendis; Niroshan Dickwella; Lahiru Kumara; Dushmantha Chameera; Jefferey Vandersay; Dhananjaya De Silva; Asela Gunarathne; Angelo Perera; Lahiru Milantha; Prabath Jayasuriya; Nishan Peiris; Kasun Rajitha; Vimukthi Perera; Nishan Madushka; Jehan Daniel; Mohommad Dilshad; Sahan Arachchige; Oshada Fernando; Kasun Madushanka	Angelo Mathews (c); Kusal Perera (vc); Dasun Shanaka; Lahiru Thirimanne; Lasith Malinga; Charith Asalanka; Malinda Pushpakumara; Sandun Weerakkody; Lahiru Gamage; Thikshila De Silva; Vishwa Fernando; Sachith Pathirana; Nipun Ransika; Bhanuka Rajapaksha; Janith Silva; Nisala Tharaka; Chamika Karunarathne; Kavishka Anjula; Praveen Jayawickrama; Dhananjaya Lakshan; Janaka Sampath

== Points table ==
Teams	Pld	W	L	NR	Pts	NRR
Team Colombo	6	4	2	0	8	+0.906
Team Dambulla	6	4	2	0	8	+0.645
Team Kandy	6	2	4	0	4	–0.048
Team Galle	6	2	4	0	4	–1.561

- Top two teams advanced to the final

== Fixtures ==
=== Group stage ===
21 August 2018
14:00
Scorecard

Colombo; 197/5 (20 overs)	v	Galle; 107 (19.2 overs)
Upul Tharanga 124* (67); Kasun Rajitha 2/38 (4 overs)		Angelo Perera 54 (35); Akila Dananjaya 3/13 (3.2 overs)

Colombo won by 90 runs
R. Premadasa Stadium, Colombo
Umpires: Lyndon Hannibal and Kumar Dharmasena

- Colombo won the toss and elected to bat.
- Kamindu Mendis (Colombo) and Jehan Daniel (Galle) both made their T20 debuts.

21 August 2018
19:00 (D/N)
Scorecard

Dambulla; 202/5 (20 overs)	v	Kandy; 184/8 (20 overs)
Ashan Priyanjan 108 (52); Malinda Pushpakumara 2/33 (4 overs)		Thikshila de Silva 63 (38); Shehan Madushanka 2/9 (1 over)

Dambulla won by 18 runs
R. Premadasa Stadium, Colombo
Umpires: Raveendra Wimalasiri and Ruchira Palliyaguruge

- Dambulla won the toss and elected to bat.
- Hasitha Boyagoda (Dambulla) and Dhananjaya Lakshan (Kandy) both made their T20 debuts.

22 August 2018
14:00
Scorecard

Colombo; 188/5 (20 overs)	v	Kandy; 188/7 (20 overs)
Shehan Jayasuriya 63 (36); Charith Asalanka 2/34 (4 overs)		Lahiru Thirimanne 50 (36); Shehan Jayasuriya 3/22 (4 overs)

Match tied
(Colombo won the Super Over)
R. Premadasa Stadium, Colombo
Umpires: Lyndon Hannibal and Ranmore Martinesz

- Colombo won the toss and elected to bat.
- Nipun Ransika (Kandy) made his T20 debut.

22 August 2018
19:00 (D/N)
Scorecard

Dambulla; 179/6 (20 overs)	v	Galle; 84 (17.5 overs)
Ashan Priyanjan 57 (41); Dhananjaya de Silva 2/11 (2 overs)		Dimuth Karunaratne 17 (22); Danushka Gunathilaka 4/21 (4 overs)

Dambulla won by 95 runs
R. Premadasa Stadium, Colombo
Umpires: Kumar Dharmasena and Raveendra Wimalasiri

- Dambulla won the toss and elected to bat

25 August 2018
14:00
Scorecard

Galle; 193/5 (20 overs)	v	Kandy; 186/8 (20 overs)
Dimuth Karunaratne 80 (49); Malinda Pushpakumara 2/38 (4 overs)		Bhanuka Rajapaksa 63 (33); Nishan Peiris 2/24 (4 overs)

Galle won by 7 runs
Rangiri Dambulla International Stadium, Colombo
Umpires: Gamini Dissanayake and Keerthi Bandara

- Galle won the toss and elected to bat.
- Nishan Madushka (Galle) made his T20 debut.

25 August 2018
19:00 (D/N)
Scorecard

Dambulla; 123 (18.5 overs)	v	Colombo; 124/7 (19 overs)
Ramith Rambukwella 33 (22); Akila Dananjaya 3/28 (4 overs)		Upul Tharanga 35 (21); Wanindu Hasaranga 3/20 (4 overs)

Colombo won by 3 wickets
Rangiri Dambulla International Stadium, Colombo
Umpires: Kapil Kottahachchi and Asanga Jayasooriya

- Dambulla won the toss and elected to bat.

26 August 2018
14:00
Scorecard

Galle; 131/8 (20 overs)	v	Colombo; 134/3 (16 overs)
Dhananjaya de Silva 44 (30); Akila Dananjaya 3/28 (4 overs)		Upul Tharanga 81 (41); Kasun Rajitha 2/36 (4 overs)

Colombo won by 7 wickets
Rangiri Dambulla International Stadium, Colombo
Umpires: Nilan De Silva and Rohitha Kottahachchi

- Galle won the toss and elected to bat.

26 August 2018
19:00 (D/N)
Scorecard

Dambulla; 217/7 (20 overs)	v	Kandy; 211/7 (20 overs)
Danushka Gunathilaka 87 (54); Lahiru Gamage 2/42 (4 overs)		Dasun Shanaka 81 (46); Dilruwan Perera 2/20 (2 overs)

Dambulla won by 6 runs
Rangiri Dambulla International Stadium, Colombo
Umpires: Ravindra Kottahachchi and Gamini Dissanayake

- Kandy won the toss and elected to field.

29 August 2018
14:00
Scorecard

Galle; 163/8 (20 overs)	v	Dambulla; 125/9 (20 overs)
Kusal Mendis 58 (32); Amila Aponso 3/22 (4 overs)		Danushka Gunathilaka 73 (58); Kasun Rajitha 4/28 (4 overs)

Galle won by 38 runs
Pallekele International Cricket Stadium, Colombo
Umpires: Prageeth Rambukwella and Hemantha Boteju

- Galle won the toss and elected to bat.

29 August 2018
19:00 (D/N)
Scorecard

Colombo; 165/7 (20 overs)	v	Kandy; 168/3 (17.3 overs)
Avishka Fernando 54 (35); Malinda Pushpakumara 2/25 (4 overs)		Kusal Perera 84 (45); Shehan Jayasuriya 2/27 (4 overs)

Kandy won by 7 wickets
Pallekele International Cricket Stadium, Colombo
Umpires: Pradeep Udawatta and Deepal Gunawardene

- Colombo won the toss and elected to bat.

30 August 2018
14:00
Scorecard

Galle; 196/5 (20 overs)	v	Kandy; 199/5 (19.2 overs)
Angelo Perera 47 (36); Charith Asalanka 4/14 (3 overs)		Dasun Shanaka 105* (52); Dhananjaya de Silva 2/9 (2 overs)

Kandy won by 5 wickets
Pallekele International Cricket Stadium, Colombo
Umpires: Prageeth Rambukwella and Pradeep Udawatta

- Galle won the toss and elected to bat.

30 August 2018
19:00 (D/N)
Scorecard

Dambulla; 140/6 (20 overs)	v	Colombo; 135/8 (20 overs)
Isuru Udana 41* (25); Jeevan Mendis 3/23 (4 overs)		Priyamal Perera 46 (47); Amila Aponso 3/13 (4 overs)

Dambulla won by 5 runs
Pallekele International Cricket Stadium, Colombo
Umpires: Hemantha Boteju and Deepal Gunawardene

- Dambulla won the toss and elected to bat.

== Final ==
2 September 2018
19:00 (D/N)
Scorecard

Dambulla; 163/8 (20 overs)	v	Colombo; 167/3 (18.2 overs)
Ramith Rambukwella 57 (40); Jeevan Mendis 2/27 (4 overs)		Upul Tharanga 104* (55); Isuru Udana 1/26 (2.2 overs)

Colombo won by 7 wickets
R. Premadasa Stadium, Colombo
Umpires: Ranmore Martinesz and Ruchira Palliyaguruge

- Dambulla won the toss and elected to bat.
