= 2017–18 Super Four Provincial Tournament =

Cricket tournament

- Dates: 30 March – 24 April 2018
- Administrator(s): Sri Lanka Cricket
- Cricket format: First-class cricket
- Tournament format(s): Round-robin
- Host(s): Sri Lanka
- Champions: Galle (1st title)
- Participants: 4
- Matches: 6
- Most runs: Roshen Silva (535)
- Most wickets: Nisala Tharaka (11)

The 2017–18 Super Four Provincial Tournament was a first-class cricket tournament, that was played in Sri Lanka during March and April 2018. It took place following the conclusion of the 2017–18 Premier League Tournament and featured four teams based on the Centers of Excellence in Sri Lanka. It was the first time this type of tournament has been played in Sri Lanka since 2013. Galle won the tournament, finishing ahead of Dambulla, despite Dambulla winning a game, with Galle drawing all their fixtures.

Sri Lanka Cricket (SLC) announced the fixtures on 21 March 2018, with the second round of matches played as day/night games. The day/night matches were used as preparation for the day/night Test match, which was played during Sri Lanka's tour of the West Indies in June 2018. Following the conclusion of the tournament, a limited overs tournament took place with the same teams.

== Points table ==
Teams	Pld	W	L	D	A	Pts
Galle	3	0	0	3	0	38.03
Dambulla	3	1	0	2	0	35.55
Kandy	3	0	0	3	0	22.55
Colombo	3	0	1	2	0	9.82

== Squads ==
The following teams and squads were named to compete in the tournament:

Colombo	Galle	Kandy	Dambulla
Dinesh Chandimal (c); Dhananjaya de Silva (vc); Kaushal Silva; Shehan Jayasuriya; Lahiru Thirimanne; Primosh Perera; Chamara Silva; Angelo Perera; Lasith Abeyratne; Lahiru Udara; Wanindu Hasaranga; Thisara Perera; Lasith Ambuldeniya; Dilruwan Perera; Lakshan Sandakan; Dushmantha Chameera; Vishwa Fernando; Kavishka Anjula; Kamindu Mendis; Nipun Malinga	Suranga Lakmal (c); Dasun Shanaka (vc); Lahiru Milantha; Rumesh Buddika; Pabasara Waduge; Shammu Ashan; Oshada Fernando; Roshen Silva; Chaturanga de Silva; Janith Liyanage; Lakshitha Madushan; Sadeera Samarawickrama; Akila Dananjaya; Madawa Warnapura; Mohomed Dilshad; Upul Tharanga; Malinda Pushpakumara; Nisala Tharaka; Nishan Peiris; Dananjaya Lakshan; Ashen Bandara	Angelo Mathews (c); Niroshan Dickwella (vc); Pathum Nissanka; Priyamal Perera; Danushka Gunathilaka; Prabath Jayasuriya; Asela Gunaratne; Tharanga Paranavitana; Minod Bhanuka; Chamara Kapugedera; Chamika Karunaratne; Jeevan Mendis; Lahiru Kumara; Ramesh Mendis; Mahela Udawatte; Sachith Pathirana; Kasun Rajitha; Lahiru Samarakoon; Jehan Daniel; Hasitha Boyagoda	Dimuth Karunaratne (c); Kusal Perera (vc); Nipun Karunanayake; Milinda Siriwardana; Kusal Mendis; Tharindu Ratnayake; Sachithra Serasinghe; Lahiru Gamage; Lahiru Madushanka; Sangeeth Cooray; Ashan Priyanjan; Rangana Herath; Ishan Jayaratne; Chanaka Komasaru; Asitha Fernando; Jeffrey Vandersay; Sachithra Senanayake; Shehan Madushanka; Himesh Ramanayake; Rashmika Dilshan; Nishan Madushka

== Fixtures ==
=== Round 1 ===
30 March–2 April 2018
Scorecard

Dambulla	v	Kandy
480 (109.4 overs); Ashan Priyanjan 156 (239); Kasun Rajitha 3/89 (22 overs)		364 (104.2 overs); Niroshan Dickwella 112 (154); Lahiru Gamage 5/71 (26 overs)
256 (65.5 overs); Milinda Siriwardana 71 (118); Kasun Rajitha 3/49 (14 overs)		221/2 (56.2 overs); Mahela Udawatte 103* (137); Ishan Jayaratne 1/9 (4 overs)

Match drawn
FTZ Sports Complex, Katunayake
Umpires: Ruchira Palliyaguruge and Asanga Jayasooriya

- Dambulla won the toss and elected to bat.

30 March–2 April 2018
Scorecard

Galle	v	Colombo
476 (141 overs); Roshen Silva 231* (392); Dilruwan Perera 3/106 (34 overs)		333 (95.5 overs); Lahiru Thirimanne 125* (258); Akila Dananjaya 3/61 (22 overs)
177/3 (56 overs); Sadeera Samarawickrama 77 (139); Vishwa Fernando 2/24 (9 overs)

Match drawn
Mahinda Rajapaksa International Cricket Stadium, Hambantota
Umpires: Deepal Gunawardene and Ranmore Martinesz

- Galle won the toss and elected to bat.

=== Round 2 ===
8–11 April 2018 (D/N)
Scorecard

Dambulla	v	Galle
244 (73.3 overs); Kusal Mendis 89 (163); Chaturanga de Silva 3/31 (10 overs)		255 (65.1 overs); Chaturanga de Silva 54 (45); Lahiru Gamage 5/78 (20.1 overs)
327/7d (89 overs); Sachithra Serasinghe 112 (208); Nisala Tharaka 5/65 (15 overs)		66/2 (27 overs); Lahiru Milantha 25 (43); Lahiru Madushanka 2/13 (7 overs)

Match drawn
Rangiri Dambulla International Stadium, Dambulla
Umpires: Lyndon Hannibal and Raveendra Wimalasiri

- Dambulla won the toss and elected to bat.
- Only three overs of play were possible on day 2 due to rain.

8–11 April 2018 (D/N)
Scorecard

Kandy	v	Colombo
270 (77.1 overs); Priyamal Perera 79 (146); Wanindu Hasaranga 4/40 (9.1 overs)		138/9d (43 overs); Kaushal Silva 26 (58); Isuru Udana 4/35 (14 overs)
65/3 (16 overs); Mahela Udawatte 41 (50); Pramod Madushan 1/1 (2 overs); Shehan Jayasuriya 1/1 (2 overs)

Match drawn
Mahinda Rajapaksa International Cricket Stadium, Hambantota
Umpires: Ruchira Palliyaguruge and Rohitha Kottahachchi

- Colombo won the toss and elected to field.
- No play was possible on day 2 and only four overs were bowled on day 4 due to rain.

=== Round 3 ===
21–24 April 2018
Scorecard

Colombo	v	Dambulla
210 (64.2 overs); Lasith Abeyratne 85 (107); Lahiru Madushanka 5/43 (13.2 overs)		359 (84.2 overs); Manoj Sarathchandra 103 (181); Dilesh Gunaratne 4/68 (16.2 overs)
351 (80.1 overs); Shehan Jayasuriya 77 (76); Jeffrey Vandersay 4/101 (24 overs)		205/5 (48 overs); Kusal Mendis 62 (117); Thikshila de Silva 3/53 (14 overs)

Dambulla won by 5 wickets
Rangiri Dambulla International Stadium, Dambulla
Umpires: Ranmore Martinesz and Pradeep Udawatta

- Colombo won the toss and elected to bat.

21–24 April 2018
Scorecard

Galle	v	Kandy
425 (120.3 overs); Roshen Silva 168 (295); Prabath Jayasuriya 4/116 (39.3 overs)		185 (41.2 overs); Niroshan Dickwella 39 (42); Nishan Peiris 6/67 (16.2 overs)
306/9d (73.5 overs); Upul Tharanga 103 (111); Chamika Karunaratne 5/63 (15.5 overs)		363/3 (81 overs); Pathum Nissanka 188* (226); Nisala Tharaka 1/37 (11 overs)

Match drawn
Mahinda Rajapaksa International Cricket Stadium, Hambantota
Umpires: Gamini Dissanayake and Deepal Gunawardene

- Galle won the toss and elected to bat.
