= 2018 Super Provincial One Day Tournament =

Cricket tournament

- Dates: 2 May – 10 June 2018
- Administrator(s): Sri Lanka Cricket
- Cricket format: List A cricket
- Tournament format(s): Round-robin and final
- Host(s): Sri Lanka
- Champions: Galle (1st title)
- Participants: 4
- Matches: 13
- Player of the series: Shehan Jayasuriya
- Most runs: Upul Tharanga (396)
- Most wickets: Malinda Pushpakumara (15)

The 2018 Super Provincial One Day Tournament was a List A cricket tournament that was played in Sri Lanka between 2 May and 10 June 2018, following the conclusion of the 2017–18 Super Four Provincial Tournament. Four teams took part in the competition: Colombo, Dambulla, Galle and Kandy. Galle and Colombo qualified for the final, after they finished first and second respectively in the group stage.

The final was originally scheduled to take place on 20 May 2018, but Sri Lanka Cricket issued a statement via Twitter to say that it was postponed indefinitely due to bad weather. The final was eventually played on 10 June 2018, at the Premadasa Stadium, Colombo, after nearly a delay of one month. Galle won the tournament, after beating Colombo by 75 runs in the rescheduled final.

== Squads ==
The following teams and squads were named to compete in the tournament:

Colombo	Galle	Kandy	Dambulla
Dinesh Chandimal (c); Thisara Perera (vc); Dhananjaya De Silva; Shehan Jayasuriya; Lahiru Thirimanne; Angelo Perera; Dilhan Cooray; Chamara Silva; Dilshan Munaweera; Lasith Abeyratne; Samith Dushantha; Nisal Francisco; Wanindu Hasaranga; Thikshila De Silva; Kavishka Anjula; Lakshan Sandakan; Sachintha Peiris; Lasith Embuldeniya; Vikum Sanjaya; Vishwa Fernando; Dushmantha Chameera; Nipun Malinga; Kamindu Mendis	Upul Tharanga (c); Dasun Shanaka (vc); Bhanuka Rajapaksa; Sadeera Samarawickrama; Lahiru Milantha; Janith Liyanage; Chaturanga de Silva; Ramith Rambukwella; Madawa Warnapura; Andy Solomons; Deshan Dias; Irosh Samarasooriya; Shehan Fernando; Shammu Ashan; Seekkuge Prasanna; Chathura Randunu; Malinda Pushpakumara; Nishan Peiris; Suranga Lakmal; Nisala Tharaka; Mohomed Dilshad; Dhananjaya Lakshan; Ashen Bandara	Angelo Mathews (c); Niroshan Dickwella (vc); Danushka Gunathilaka; Asela Gunaratne; Chamara Kapugedara; Minod Bhanuka; Mahela Udawatte; Avishka Fernando; Tharanga Paranavitana; Priyamal Perera; Pathum Nissanka; Jeewan Mendis; Sachith Pathirana; Adeesha Nanayakkara; Ramesh Mendis; Pramod Madushan; Charith Asalanka; Isuru Udana; Nipuna Kariyawasam; Kasun Rajitha; Lahiru Kumara; Prabath Jayasuriya; Hasitha Boyagoda; Jehan Daniel	Kusal Perera (c); Milinda Siriwardana (vc); Lasith Malinga; Kusal Mendis; Dimuth Karunaratne; Amila Aponso; Sachithra Serasinghe; Sachithra Senanayake; Ashan Priyanjan; Lahiru Gamage; Nipun Karunanayake; Sangeeth Cooray; Tillakaratne Sampath; Lahiru Madushanka; Asitha Fernando; Jeffrey Vandersay; Shehan Madushanka; Ruvindu Gunasekera; Kosala Kulasekara; Sahan Nanayakkara; Mahesh Priyadarshana; D A Rathnayake; Nishan Madushka; Rashmika Dilshan

== Points table ==
Teams	Pld	W	L	NR	Pts	NRR
Galle	6	4	1	1	19	+0.764
Colombo	6	3	2	1	15	–0.295
Dambulla	6	2	3	1	12	+1.021
Kandy	6	1	4	1	6	–1.453

- Top two teams advanced to the final

== Fixtures ==
=== Round Robin ===
2 May 2018
09:45
Scorecard

Dambulla; 270/6 (40 overs)	v	Colombo; 262/6 (39 overs)
Kusal Perera 60 (40); Dilruwan Perera 2/39 (7 overs)		Lahiru Thirimanne 107 (99); Asitha Fernando 2/47 (8 overs)

Colombo won by 4 runs (D/L method)
R Premadasa Stadium, Colombo
Umpires: Rohitha Kottahachchi and Ranmore Martinesz

- Colombo has won the toss and elected to field.
- Colombo were set a revised target of 259 runs from 39 overs.
- Nishan Madushka (Dambulla) made his List A debut.

2 May 2018
09:45
Scorecard

Galle; 250 (35.4 overs)	v	Kandy; 217/2 (30 overs)
Shammu Ashan 72 (73); Isuru Udana 5/59 (7.4 overs)		Mahela Udawatte 116 (96); Chaturanga de Silva 1/14 (3 overs)

Kandy won by 28 runs (D/L method)
P Sara Oval, Colombo
Umpires: Ruchira Palliyaguruge and Ravindra Kottahachchi

- Kandy won the toss and elected to field.
- Kandy were set a revised target of 190 runs from 30 overs.
- Jehan Daniel (Kandy) made his List A debut.

5 May 2018
09:45
Scorecard

Colombo; 299 (49.2 overs)	v	Kandy; 241 (43.4 overs)
Shehan Jayasuriya 110 (100); Jeevan Mendis 4/38 (7.2 overs)		Mahela Udawatte 71 (74); Lakshan Sandakan 4/59 (10 overs)

Colombo won by 58 runs
R Premadasa Stadium, Colombo
Umpires: Asanga Jayasooriya and Raveendra Wimalasiri

- Colombo won the toss and elected to bat.

5 May 2018
09:45
Scorecard

Dambulla; 257/8 (50 overs)	v	Galle; 250/8 (46 overs)
Ashan Priyanjan 101 (120); Dasun Shanaka 3/42 (8 overs)		Upul Tharanga 86 (79); Lakshan Sandakan 4/59 (10 overs)

Galle won by 11 runs (D/L method)
Colombo Cricket Club Ground, Colombo
Umpires: Deepal Gunawardene and Ravindra Kottahachchi

- Galle won the toss and elected to field.
- Galle were set a revised target of 240 runs from 46 overs.

8 May 2018
09:45
Scorecard

Galle; 347/7 (50 overs)	v	Colombo; 200 (42.4 overs)
Sadeera Samarawickrama 130 (118); Lakshan Sandakan 3/66 (10 overs)		Shehan Jayasuriya 70 (65); Malinda Pushpakumara 4/24 (10 overs)

Galle won by 147 runs
R Premadasa Stadium, Colombo
Umpires: Gamini Dissanayake and Lyndon Hannibal

- Galle won the toss and elected to bat.

8 May 2018
09:45
Scorecard

Kandy; 127 (29.1 overs)	v	Dambulla; 130/5 (18.5 overs)
Chamara Kapugedera 40 (52); Jeffrey Vandersay 4/7 (4.1 overs)		Kusal Perera 41 (24); Sachith Pathirana 3/21 (2.5 overs)

Dambulla won by 5 wickets
P Sara Oval, Colombo
Umpires: Raveendra Wimalasiri and Rohitha Kottahachchi

- Dambulla won the toss and elected to field.

11 May 2018
09:45
Scorecard

Colombo; 162 (39.4 overs)	v	Dambulla; 166/4 (36.3 overs)
Lasith Abeyratne 49 (80); Ashan Priyanjan 3/11 (4.4 overs)		Sandun Weerakkody 96 (83); Sachintha Peiris 2/31 (7.3 overs)

Dambulla won by 6 wickets
Colombo Cricket Club Ground, Colombo
Umpires: Pradeep Udawatta and Ranmore Martinesz

- Colombo won the toss and elected to bat.
- Rashmika Dilshan (Dambulla) made his List A debut.

11 May 2018
09:45
Scorecard

Kandy; 272/9 (50 overs)	v	Galle; 276/7 (47.4 overs)
Minod Bhanuka 82 (83); Malinda Pushpakumara 4/41 (10 overs)		Upul Tharanga 127 (121); Sachith Pathirana 2/41 (7.4 overs)

Galle won by 3 wickets
P Sara Oval, Colombo
Umpires: Raveendra Wimalasiri and Ruchira Palliyaguruge

- Kandy won the toss and elected to bat.
- Dhananjaya Lakshan (Galle) made his List A debut.

14 May 2018
09:45
Scorecard

Colombo; 309/8 (50 overs)	v	Kandy; 217 (48.3 overs)
Lahiru Thirimanne 90* (69); Sachith Pathirana 3/41 (5 overs)		Danushka Gunathilaka 59 (76); Wanindu Hasaranga 4/43 (10 overs)

Colombo won by 92 runs
P Sara Oval, Colombo
Umpires: Prageeth Rambukwella and Kapil Kottahachchi

- Kandy won the toss and elected to field.

14 May 2018
09:45
Scorecard

Dambulla; 287/9 (47 overs)	v	Galle; 218/3 (37.3 overs)
Sachithra Senanayake 65 (60); Malinda Pushpakumara 3/27 (10 overs)		Upul Tharanga 57 (26); Sachithra Serasinghe 2/23 (5 overs)

Galle won by 15 runs (D/L method)
R Premadasa Stadium, Colombo
Umpires: Nilan De Silva and Asanga Jayasooriya

- Galle won the toss and elected to field.
- Galle were set a revised target of 204 runs from 37.3 overs.

17 May 2018
09:45
Scorecard

Galle; 155/2 (30 overs)	v	Colombo
Sadeera Samarawickrama 72* (94); Shehan Jayasuriya 1/22 (5 overs)

No result
R Premadasa Stadium, Colombo
Umpires: Keerthi Bandara and Deepal Gunawardene

- Galle won the toss and elected to bat.
- Rain during Galle's innings prevented any further play.

17 May 2018
09:45
Scorecard

Dambulla; 257/7 (49 overs)	v	Kandy; 17/0 (1.1 overs)
Ashan Priyanjan 73 (77); Charith Asalanka 2/32 (7 overs)		Danushka Gunathilaka 13* (5)

No result
P Sara Oval, Colombo
Umpires: Hemantha Boteju and Gamini Dissanayake

- Kandy won the toss and elected to field.
- Rain during Kandy's innings prevented any further play.
- Hasitha Boyagoda (Kandy) made his List A debut.

== Final ==
10 June 2018
09:30
Scorecard

Galle; 320/7 (50 overs)	v	Colombo; 245 (44.2 overs)
Upul Tharanga 124 (122); Lakshan Sandakan 4/66 (10 overs)		Shehan Jayasuriya 51 (40); Malinda Pushpakumara 3/31 (8.2 overs)

Galle won by 75 runs
Premadasa Stadium, Colombo
Umpires: Ruchira Palliyaguruge and Raveendra Wimalasiri
Player of the match: Upul Tharanga (Galle)

- Galle won the toss and elected to bat.
