= Irosh =

Irosh is a given name. Notable people with the name include:

- Irosh Fernando (born 1999), Sri Lankan cricketer
- Irosh Samarasooriya (born 1991), Sri Lankan cricketer
