= List of Bloomfield Cricket and Athletic Club cricketers =

List of first-class cricketers by club

This is an incomplete list in alphabetical order of cricketers who have played for Bloomfield Cricket and Athletic Club in top-class (Note: Top-class matches are first-class, List A, and Twenty20.) matches since the club initially achieved List A status in 1988.

== Key ==
- † preceding a player's name means that the original article is now a redirect to this list.

== J ==
- Sanath Jayasuriya

== K ==
- Nipun Karunanayake

== R ==
- Kasun Rajitha
