= Anurudda =

Anurudda is both a given name and a surname. Notable people with the name include:

- Anurudda Polonowita (born 1938), Ceylonese cricketer
- Anurudda Rajapakse (born 1985), Sri Lankan cricketer
- Roshan Anurudda (born 1995), Sri Lankan cricketer
