= Sheshan Fernando =

Sri Lankan cricketer (born 1999)

Personal information
- Born: 13 November 1999 (age 26)
- Source: Cricinfo, 15 December 2019

Sheshan Fernando (born 13 November 1999) is a Sri Lankan cricketer. He made his first-class debut on 15 February 2018, for Chilaw Marians Cricket Club in the 2017–18 Premier League Tournament. He made his List A debut on 15 December 2019, for Negombo Cricket Club in the 2019–20 Invitation Limited Over Tournament. He made his Twenty20 debut on 4 January 2020, for Negombo Cricket Club in the 2019–20 SLC Twenty20 Tournament.
