= Shashin =

Shashin is both a given name and a surname. Notable people with the name include:

- Shashin Dilranga (born 1994), Sri Lankan cricketer
- Valentin Shashin (1916–1977), Soviet engineer
