= Himesh =

Himesh is a given name. Notable people with the name include:

- Himesh Patel (born 1990), British actor and singer
- Himesh Ramanayake (born 1997), Sri Lankan cricketer
- Himesh Reshammiya (born 1973), Indian actor, filmmaker, and music producer
