= Sachithra Serasinghe =

Sri Lankan cricketer (born 1987)

Personal information
- Full name: Serasinghe Pathiranage Sachithra Chaturanga
- Born: 13 April 1987 (age 39); Colombo, Sri Lanka
- Batting: Right-handed
- Bowling: Right-arm offbreak
- Role: Allrounder

Domestic team information
- Years: Team
- Chilaw Marians Cricket Club
- Tamil Union Cricket and Athletic Club
- Colts Cricket Club
- FC debut: 8 December 2006 Colts Cricket Club v Sebastianites Cricket and Athletic Club
- LA debut: 3 December 2006 Colts Cricket Club v Badureliya Sports Club

Career statistics
Competition	FC	LA	T20
Matches	55	53	9
Runs scored	3115	1253	134
Batting average	45.80	31.32	16.75
100s/50s	8/14	1/8	0/0
Top score	154	104	37
Balls bowled	5323	1803	180
Wickets	99	42	15
Bowling average	29.13	27.85	13.66
5 wickets in innings	2	1	1
10 wickets in match	0	0	0
Best bowling	5/75	5/28	5/22
Catches/stumpings	31/0	18/0	4/0
- Source: CricInfo, 9 July 2012

Serasinghe Pathiranage Sachithra Chaturanga (born 13 April 1987) is a Sri Lankan cricketer who plays for the Tamil Union Cricket and Athletic Club. Sachithra has scored eight centuries and taken nearly 100 wickets for the Tamil Union club, Sri Lankan A team and the Sri Lankan Board XI.

== Early and domestic career ==
Sachithra was educated at Nalanda College Colombo and played cricket for Nalanda College first XI team from 2003 to 2004.

In March 2018, he was named in Dambulla's squad for the 2017–18 Super Four Provincial Tournament. The following month, he was also named in Dambulla's squad for the 2018 Super Provincial One Day Tournament. In August 2018, he was named in Colombo's squad the 2018 SLC T20 League.

He was the leading run-scorer for Tamil Union Cricket and Athletic Club in the 2018–19 Premier League Tournament, with 1,001 runs in ten matches. In February 2019, Sri Lanka Cricket named him as the Player of the Tournament in the 2017–18 Premier League Tournament. In March 2019, he was named in Dambulla's squad for the 2019 Super Provincial One Day Tournament.
