= Thilanga =

Thilanga is a given name. Notable people with the name include:

- Thilanga Udeshana (born 1998), Sri Lankan cricketer
- Thilanga Sumathipala (born 1964), Sri Lankan politician
