= Chanaka Komasaru =

Sri Lankan cricketer (born 1983)

Personal information
- Born: 10 September 1983 (age 43); Matara, Sri Lanka
- Batting: Left-handed
- Bowling: Slow left arm Orthodox
- Source: Cricinfo, 13 March 2017

Chanaka Komasaru (born 10 September 1983) is a Sri Lankan cricketer. He has played more than 100 first-class matches in Sri Lanka since the 2000–01 season. He made his Twenty20 debut on 17 August 2004, for Colts Cricket Club in the 2004 SLC Twenty20 Tournament.

In March 2018, he was named in Dambulla's squad for the 2017–18 Super Four Provincial Tournament. He was the leading wicket-taker for Sri Lanka Ports Authority Cricket Club in the 2018–19 Premier League Tournament, with 37 dismissals in nine matches. In February 2019, Sri Lanka Cricket named him as the Best Bowler in the 2017–18 Premier League Tournament.
