= Nadras Prasad =

Indian cricketer (born 1985)

Personal information
- Born: 31 July 1985 (age 41)
- Source: ESPNcricinfo, 14 January 2018

Nadras Prasad (born 31 July 1985) is an Indian cricketer. He made his first-class debut for Badureliya Sports Club in the 2017–18 Premier League Tournament on 6 January 2018.
