= Tharindu Dharsana =

Sri Lankan cricketer (born 1988)

Personal information
- Born: 16 November 1988 (age 37)
- Source: Cricinfo, 17 December 2017

Tharindu Dharsana (born 16 November 1988) is a Sri Lankan cricketer. He made his first-class debut for Sri Lanka Army Sports Club in the 2017–18 Premier League Tournament on 15 December 2017.
