= Malka Madusanka =

Sri Lankan cricketer (born 1995)

Personal information
- Born: 19 October 1995 (age 31)
- Source: Cricinfo, 14 January 2018

Malka Madusanka (born 19 October 1995) is a Sri Lankan cricketer. He made his first-class debut for Sri Lanka Army Sports Club in the 2017–18 Premier League Tournament on 15 December 2017.
