= Nilantha Bopage =

Sri Lankan cricketer (born 1972)

Personal information
- Born: 1 January 1972 (age 54)
- Source: Cricinfo, 28 December 2017

Nilantha Bopage (born 1 January 1972) is a Sri Lankan former cricketer. He played in 77 first-class and 22 List A matches for various domestic sides in Sri Lanka between 1989 and 2003. He is now an umpire and has stood in matches in the 2017–18 Premier League Tournament.
