= Umesh Kasun =

Sri Lankan cricketer (born 1996)

Personal information
- Full name: Umesh Kasun Ramchand
- Born: 2 December 1996 (age 29); Colombo, Sri Lanka
- Batting: Right-handed
- Bowling: Right arm offbreak
- Role: Batting allrounder
- Source: Cricinfo, 3 April 2017

Umesh Kasun (born 2 December 1996) is a Sri Lankan cricketer. He made his List A debut for Nuwara Eliya District in the 2016–17 Districts One Day Tournament on 21 March 2017. He made his first-class debut for Moors Sports Club in the 2017–18 Premier League Tournament on 26 January 2018.
