= Rumesh Buddika =

Sri Lankan cricketer

Personal information
- Full name: Rumesh Buddika Muthukumarana
- Born: 14 November 1990 (age 35); Matara, Southern Province, Sri Lanka
- Batting: Left-handed
- Bowling: Right-arm off-break

Domestic team information
- Years: Team
- 2016/17: BRC
- 2015/16: Galle Cricket Club
- 2018/2020: Chilaw Marians Cricket Club

Career statistics
Competition	FC	LA
Matches	91	66
Runs scored	6005	1442
Batting average	42.89	24.86
100s/50s	16/27	1/8
Top score	239*	125
Balls bowled	1688	780
Wickets	25	18
Bowling average	43.56	32.22
5 wickets in innings	–	–
10 wickets in match	–	–
Best bowling	3/50	3/32
Catches/stumpings	70/–	21/–
- Source: Cricinfo, 18 December 2020

Rumesh Buddika Muthukumarana (born 14 November 1990) is a Sri Lankan cricketer. He is a left-handed batsman and right-arm off-break bowler who currently plays for Chilaw Marians Cricket Club. He was born in Matara District and had his education at Mahinda College, Galle, where he started his cricket career.

== Cricket career ==
He represented Sri Lanka in the 2010 ICC Under-19 Cricket World Cup, which was held in New Zealand. Buddika, who played in the 2008 Under-23 tournament for Chilaw Marians, joined Ragama Cricket Club in 2009, with whom he reached the semi-finals of the same competition with their representative Under-23 team. Buddika made his List A debut in the Premier Limited Overs Tournament in 2009–10, against Colts. He later represented Tamil Union cricket club for a few seasons, before moving to Galle Cricket Club in the 2015/ 2016 season.

Rumesh has scored over 6000 first class runs including 16 hundreds. His career best performance is 239 not out for Tamil Union against Moors in 2014. He currently averages over 40 in first class cricket and is one of the most consistent performers in Sri Lankan club cricket. Rumesh Buddika also holds the Galle Cricket Club's record for the highest individual score by a batsman in first class cricket.

In March 2018, he was named in Galle's squad for the 2017–18 Super Four Provincial Tournament. He was the leading run-scorer for Burgher Recreation Club in the 2018–19 Premier League Tournament, with 781 runs in nine matches. He is also a former captain of the Sri Lankan Development Emerging Team.

== Records and trivia ==
- In an Under 19 one day cricket match held between Sri Lanka and South Africa at Wanderers Stadium, Johannesburg in 2009, Rumesh Buddika outscored the entire opposition in their home conditions by 4 runs. He scored 139 runs in that game while the entire South African team managed to score only 135 runs.
