= Sri Lankan cricket team in India in 2015–16 =

International cricket tour

	India	Sri Lanka
- Dates: 9 February 2016 – 14 February 2016
Captains	MS Dhoni	Dinesh Chandimal

Twenty20 International series
- Results: India won the 3-match series 2–1
Most runs	Shikhar Dhawan (106)	Dinesh Chandimal (74)
Most wickets	Ravichandran Ashwin (9)	Dushmantha Chameera (5)
- Player of the series: Ravichandran Ashwin (Ind)

The Sri Lankan cricket team toured India from 9 to 14 February 2016 to play three Twenty20 International matches. On 24 May 2015, the Board of Control for Cricket in India (BCCI) announced the venues for the series. They were played in Pune, Ranchi and Visakhapatnam. Initially Delhi was scheduled to host the second match, but the match was later moved to Ranchi. India won the series 2–1.

== Squads ==
T20Is
India	Sri Lanka
MS Dhoni (c) (wk); Ravichandran Ashwin; Jasprit Bumrah; Shikhar Dhawan; Ravindra Jadeja; Bhuvneshwar Kumar; Pawan Negi; Ashish Nehra; Manish Pandey; Hardik Pandya; Ajinkya Rahane; Suresh Raina; Rohit Sharma; Harbhajan Singh; Yuvraj Singh	Dinesh Chandimal (c) (wk); Dushmantha Chameera; Niroshan Dickwella (wk); Tillakaratne Dilshan; Binura Fernando; Dilhara Fernando; Asela Gunaratne; Danushka Gunathilaka; Chamara Kapugedera; Thisara Perera; Seekuge Prasanna; Kasun Rajitha; Sachithra Senanayake; Dasun Shanaka; Milinda Siriwardana; Jeffrey Vandersay; Shaminda Eranga

Niroshan Dickwella was added to Sri Lanka's squad as cover for Tillakaratne Dilshan, who was ruled out of the first match due to an injury. Shaminda Eranga replaced Binura Fernando due to a hamstring injury.

== T20I series ==
=== 1st T20I ===
9 February
19:30 (D/N)
Scorecard

India; 101 (18.5 overs)	v	Sri Lanka; 105/5 (18 overs)
Ravichandran Ashwin 31* (24); Dasun Shanaka 3/16 (3 overs)		Dinesh Chandimal 35 (35); Ravichandran Ashwin 2/13 (3 overs)

Sri Lanka won by 5 wickets
Maharashtra Cricket Association Stadium, Pune
Umpires: Vineet Kulkarni (Ind) and C. K. Nandan (Ind)
Player of the match: Kasun Rajitha (SL)

- Sri Lanka won the toss and elected to field.
- Niroshan Dickwella and Kasun Rajitha (SL) both made their T20I debuts.
- Suresh Raina (Ind) played in his 50th T20I match.

=== 2nd T20I ===
12 February
19:30 (D/N)
Scorecard

India; 196/6 (20 overs)	v	Sri Lanka; 127/9 (20 overs)
Shikhar Dhawan 51 (25); Thisara Perera 3/33 (3 overs)		Chamara Kapugedera 32 (27); Ravichandran Ashwin 3/14 (4 overs)

India won by 69 runs
JSCA International Stadium Complex, Ranchi
Umpires: Anil Chaudhary (Ind) and Vineet Kulkarni (Ind)
Player of the match: Shikhar Dhawan (Ind)

- Sri Lanka won the toss and elected to field.
- This was the first T20I match at this venue.
- Thisara Perera became the first Sri Lankan player and fourth overall to take a hat-trick in a T20I.

=== 3rd T20I ===
14 February
19:30 (D/N)
Scorecard

Sri Lanka; 82 (18 overs)	v	India; 84/1 (13.5 overs)
Dasun Shanaka 19 (24); Ravichandran Ashwin 4/8 (4 overs)		Shikhar Dhawan 46* (46); Dushmantha Chameera 1/14 (2 overs)

India won by 9 wickets
Dr. Y.S. Rajasekhara Reddy ACA-VDCA Cricket Stadium, Visakhapatnam
Umpires: Anil Chaudhary (Ind) and C. K. Nandan (Ind)
Player of the match: Ravichandran Ashwin (Ind)

- India won the toss and elected to field.
- Asela Gunaratne (SL) made his T20I debut
- Ravichandran Ashwin (Ind) took the best figures for an Indian player in T20Is.
- India retained their number one ranking in the ICC T20I Championship.
