= Kavin Bandara =

Sri Lankan cricketer (born 1997)

Personal information
- Full name: Walgampaha Mudiyanselage Kavin Bandara
- Born: 20 August 1997 (age 29); Colombo, Sri Lanka
- Batting: Left-handed
- Bowling: Right-arm medium fast

Domestic team information
- Years: Team
- 2017–present: Colombo CC
- 2022–present: Nondescripts
- 2022: Colombo Strikers
- 2022–present: Kandy

Career statistics
Competition	FC	LA	T20
Matches	37	55	18
Runs scored	1,892	1,137	265
Batting average	35.69	24.19	33.12
100s/50s	1/16	0/5	0/2
Top score	110*	85	82
Catches/stumpings	13/–	14/–	10/–
- Source: Cricinfo, 27 April 2025

Walgampaha Mudiyanselage Kavin Bandara (born 20 August 1997) is a Sri Lankan cricketer. He made his first-class debut for Colombo Cricket Club in the 2017–18 Premier League Tournament on 15 December 2017. Prior to his first-class debut, he was named in Sri Lanka's squad for the 2016 Under-19 Cricket World Cup.

He made his List A debut for Colombo Cricket Club in the 2017–18 Premier Limited Overs Tournament on 12 March 2018. He made his Twenty20 debut on 23 May 2022, for Nondescripts Cricket Club in the Major Clubs T20 Tournament.
