= Tillakaratne Sampath =

Sri Lankan cricketer (born 1982)

Personal information
- Full name: Tillakaratne Mudiyanselage Nishan Sampath
- Born: 23 June 1982 (age 44); Jaffna, Sri Lanka
- Batting: Right-handed
- Bowling: Right arm off spin
- Role: All-rounder
- Relatives: Tillakaratne Dilshan (brother)

Tillakaratne Mudiyanselage Nishan Sampath (born June 23, 1982, in Jaffna, Sri Lanka) (born Tuwan Mohammad Nishan Sampath) is a Sri Lankan first class cricketer and brother of Sri Lankan national cricket team player Tillakaratne Dilshan. He studied at the Kalutara Vidyalaya. He made his Twenty20 debut on 17 August 2004, for Bloomfield Cricket and Athletic Club against Police Sports Club in the 2004 SLC Twenty20 Tournament. His brother also played for the same team in Sampath's debut game. In April 2018, he was named in Dambulla's squad for the 2018 Super Provincial One Day Tournament.

In November 2021, he was selected to play for the Colombo Stars following the players' draft for the 2021 Lanka Premier League.
