= Himesh Ramanayake =

Sri Lankan cricketer (born 1997)

Personal information
- Full name: Himesh Hewage Ramanayake
- Born: 5 October 1997 (age 29); Manchester, England
- Batting: Right-handed
- Bowling: Right-arm medium-fast
- Role: All-rounder
- Source: Cricinfo, 9 December 2017

Himesh Ramanayake (born 5 October 1997) is a Sri Lankan cricketer. He made his first-class debut for Burgher Recreation Club in the 2017–18 Premier League Tournament on 8 December 2017. He made his Twenty20 debut for Burgher Recreation Club in the 2017–18 SLC Twenty20 Tournament on 25 February 2018. He made his List A debut for Burgher Recreation Club in the 2017–18 Premier Limited Overs Tournament on 10 March 2018.

In March 2018, he was named in Dambulla's squad for the 2017–18 Super Four Provincial Tournament. In October 2020, he was drafted by the Colombo Kings for the inaugural edition of the Lanka Premier League.

In March 2021, he was part of the Sinhalese Sports Club team that won the 2020–21 SLC Twenty20 Tournament, the first time they had won the tournament since 2005. In August 2021, he was named in the SLC Reds team for the 2021 SLC Invitational T20 League tournament.
