= Sangeeth Cooray =

Sri Lankan cricketer (born 1995)

Personal information
- Born: 15 March 1995 (age 31); Colombo, Sri Lanka
- Source: ESPNcricinfo, 15 December 2016

Sangeeth Cooray (born 15 March 1995) is a Sri Lankan cricketer. He made his first-class debut for Saracens Sports Club in the 2015–16 Premier League Tournament on 4 December 2015.

His exploits for Colts, in both first-class and List A, have culminated with Sri Lankan Board, Emerging Players, and Sri Lanka ‘A’ inclusion in recent years.

In June 2019, he struck scores of 88 and 61 for the latter against their Indian counterparts. He was then involved with the Emerging Players Tri-Series the following month. In March 2020, he also showed his all-round prowess, bagging the wicket of Keaton Jennings during England’s tour of Sri Lanka.

In March 2018, he was named in Dambulla's squad for the 2017–18 Super Four Provincial Tournament. The following month, he was also named in Dambulla's squad for the 2018 Super Provincial One Day Tournament. In August 2021, he was named in the SLC Greys team for the 2021 SLC Invitational T20 League tournament.

In the 2022 Major Clubs 20-Over Tournament, he scored 381 runs, including innings of 145, 100 and 64 and was named Best Batsman. He was also named Best Batsman at the 2025 Sri Lanka Cricket Awards for the Major Clubs 50-Over Tournament.

In the Nepal Premier League, Cooray represented Janakpur Bolts and received the award for Most Boundaries in a 2025 NPL qualifier match.
