= Roshan Anurudda =

Sri Lankan cricketer (born 1995)

Personal information
- Born: 15 January 1995 (age 31); Ragama, Sri Lanka
- Source: ESPNcricinfo, 15 February 2017

Roshan Anurudda (born 15 January 1995) is a Sri Lankan cricketer. He made his first-class debut for Colombo Cricket Club in the 2014–15 Premier Trophy on 5 March 2015. He along with Lasith Abeyratne, he holds the record for the 7th-wicket partnership in any forms of T20 cricket, with 107 runs not out.
