= Lakshitha Madushan =

Sri Lankan cricketer (born 1992)

Personal information
- Full name: Alankaragedara Viraj Lakshitha Madushan
- Born: 11 June 1992 (age 34); Kandy, Sri Lanka
- Batting: Right-handed
- Bowling: Legbreak
- Source: ESPNcricinfo, 23 December 2016

Alankaragedara Viraj Lakshitha Madushan (born 11 June 1992) is a Sri Lankan cricketer. He made his first-class debut for Sri Lanka Army Sports Club in the 2012–13 Premier Trophy on 1 February 2013.

In March 2018, he was named in Galle's squad for the 2017–18 Super Four Provincial Tournament.
