= Sachintha Peiris =

Sri Lankan cricketer (born 1995)

Personal information
- Full name: Sachintha Navin Peiris
- Born: 16 November 1995 (age 30); Kurunegala, Sri Lanka
- Batting: Right handed
- Bowling: Right arm offbreak
- Source: Cricinfo, 15 February 2017

Sachintha Peiris (born 16 November 1995) is a Sri Lankan cricketer. He made his first-class debut for Nondescripts Cricket Club in the 2015–16 Premier League Tournament on 25 February 2016. He made his List A debut for Nondescripts Cricket Club in the 2017–18 Premier Limited Overs Tournament on 10 March 2018.

In April 2018, he was named in Colombo's squad for the 2018 Super Provincial One Day Tournament. He was the leading wicket-taker for Nondescripts Cricket Club in the 2018–19 Premier League Tournament, with 37 dismissals in ten matches.
