= Deshan Dias =

Sri Lankan cricketer (born 1992)

Personal information
- Born: 12 March 1992 (age 34); Moratuwa, Sri Lanka
- Source: Cricinfo, 10 December 2016

Deshan Dias (born 12 March 1992) is a Sri Lankan cricketer. He made his first-class debut for Lankan Cricket Club in the 2011–12 Premier Trophy on 5 February 2012.

In April 2018, he was named in Galle's squad for the 2018 Super Provincial One Day Tournament.

In April 2026, Dias was confirmed as the Overseas Professional for GMCL side, Mottram Cricket Club. After a strong 1st season at Mottram, it was confirmed Dias would return for their GMCL Championship campaign in 2027.
