= Pasindu Lakshanka =

Sri Lankan cricketer (born 1996)

Personal information
- Born: 21 July 1996 (age 29); Galle, Sri Lanka
- Batting: Right-handed
- Bowling: Right-arm offbreak
- Role: Wicket-keeper batsman
- Source: Cricinfo, 18 March 2017

Pasindu Lakshanka (born 21 July 1996) is a Sri Lankan cricketer. He made his first-class debut for Sri Lanka Air Force Sports Club in the 2014–15 Premier Trophy on 16 January 2015.
