= Primosh Perera =

Sri Lankan cricketer (born 1989)

Personal information
- Born: 17 May 1989 (age 37); Colombo, Sri Lanka
- Batting: Left-handed
- Bowling: Legbreak
- Role: Batting allrounder
- Source: Cricinfo, 28 January 2016

Primosh Perera (born 17 May 1989) is a Sri Lankan first-class cricketer who plays for Bloomfield Cricket and Athletic Club. In March 2018, he was named in Colombo's squad for the 2017–18 Super Four Provincial Tournament.
