= Jehan Daniel =

Sri Lankan cricketer (born 1999)

Personal information
- Full name: Jehan Kieth Zeon Daniel (Note: His middle names are recorded as Kieth Zeon on Cricinfo and Keeth Ceon on CricketArchive)
- Born: 12 April 1999 (age 27); Colombo, Sri Lanka
- Batting: Right-handed
- Bowling: Right-arm medium fast

Domestic team information
- Years: Team
- 2018/19-Present: Colts Cricket Club

Career statistics
Competition	FC	LA
Matches	23	37
Runs scored	584	538
Batting average	22.46	17.93
100s/50s	0/4	0/3
Top score	67	79
Balls bowled	786	444
Wickets	21	9
Bowling average	29.61	47.33
5 wickets in innings	0	0
10 wickets in match	0	0
Best bowling	3/33	3/43
Catches/stumpings	15/–	14/–
Medal record
Representing Sri Lanka
Men's Cricket
South Asian Games
Silver medal – second place	2019 Kathmandu/Pokhara	Team
- Source: Cricinfo, 12 March 2024

Jehan Kieth Zeon Daniel (born 12 April 1999) is a Sri Lankan cricketer who plays for Colts Cricket Club in domestic cricket. He also represented the national Under-19 team in the 2016 U19 World Cup.

In December 2017, he was named as the vice captain of Sri Lanka's squad for the 2018 Under-19 Cricket World Cup. In March 2018, he was named in Kandy's squad for the 2017–18 Super Four Provincial Tournament. The following month, he was also named in Kandy's squad for the 2018 Super Provincial One Day Tournament. He made his List A debut for Kandy in the 2018 Super Provincial One Day Tournament on 2 May 2018.

In August 2018, he was named in Galle's squad the 2018 SLC T20 League. He made his Twenty20 debut for Galle on 21 August 2018. In the same month, Sri Lanka Cricket named him in a preliminary squad of 31 players for the 2018 Asia Cup.

He made his first-class debut for Colts Cricket Club in the 2018–19 Premier League Tournament on 30 November 2018.

In December 2018, he was named in Sri Lanka team for the 2018 ACC Emerging Teams Asia Cup. In November 2019, he was named in Sri Lanka's squad for the 2019 ACC Emerging Teams Asia Cup in Bangladesh. Later the same month, he was named in Sri Lanka's squad for the cricket tournament at the 2019 South Asian Games. The Sri Lanka team won the silver medal, after they lost to Bangladesh by seven wickets in the final. In August 2021, he was named in the SLC Reds team for the 2021 SLC Invitational T20 League tournament. However, prior to the first match, he failed a fitness test.

In November 2021, he was selected to play for the Colombo Stars following the players' draft for the 2021 Lanka Premier League.
