= Kasun Vidura =

Sri Lankan cricketer (born 1993)

Personal information
- Full name: Appuhamilage Kasun Vidura Adikari
- Born: 6 October 1993 (age 33); Ragama, Sri Lanka
- Source: Cricinfo, 13 March 2017

Appuhamilage Kasun Vidura Adikari (born 6 October 1993) is a Sri Lankan cricketer. He made his first-class debut for Chilaw Marians Cricket Club in the 2012–13 Premier Trophy on 1 March 2013.

== See also ==
- List of Chilaw Marians Cricket Club players
