= Akthab Cader =

Sri Lankan cricketer (born 1995)

Personal information
- Full name: Mohomed Akthab Ardil Hamza Abdul Cader
- Born: 3 January 1995 (age 31); Colombo, Sri Lanka
- Batting: Right-handed
- Bowling: Left-arm
- Role: Bowler

Domestic team information
- Years: Team
- 2014–15: Baduraliya
- 2016–present: SSC
- Source: Cricinfo, 15 March 2017

Akthab Cader (born 3 January 1995) is a Sri Lankan cricketer. He made his first-class debut for Badureliya Sports Club in the 2015–16 Premier League Tournament on 18 December 2015. He made his List A debut on 14 December 2019, for Bloomfield Cricket and Athletic Club in the 2019–20 Invitation Limited Over Tournament. He made his Twenty20 debut on 23 May 2022, for Sebastianites Cricket and Athletic Club in the Major Clubs T20 Tournament.
