= Irosh Fernando =

Sri Lankan cricketer (born 1999)

Personal information
- Born: 27 May 1999 (age 27)
- Source: Cricinfo, 21 January 2018

Irosh Fernando (born 27 May 1999) is a Sri Lankan cricketer. He made his first-class debut for Chilaw Marians Cricket Club in the 2017–18 Premier League Tournament on 19 January 2018. He made his Twenty20 debut for Chilaw Marians Cricket Club in the 2018–19 SLC Twenty20 Tournament on 15 February 2019. He made his List A debut for Chilaw Marians Cricket Club in the 2018–19 Premier Limited Overs Tournament on 4 March 2019.
