= Shehan Jayasuriya =

Sri Lankan-born cricketer (born 1991)

Personal information
- Full name: Gampalage Shehan Naveendra De Fonseka Gunawarna Jayasuriya
- Born: September 12, 1991 (age 35); Colombo, Sri Lanka
- Height: 1.78 m (5 ft 10 in)
- Batting: Left-handed
- Bowling: Right-arm off break
- Role: Batting all-rounder

International information
- National sides: Sri Lanka (2015–2020); United States (2026–present)
- ODI debut (cap 167/52): November 1, 2015; Sri Lanka v West Indies
- Last ODI: May 16, 2026; United States v Nepal
- ODI shirt no.: 31
- T20I debut (cap 57): August 1, 2015; Sri Lanka v Pakistan
- Last T20I: March 6, 2020; Sri Lanka v West Indies

Domestic team information
- Years: Team
- 2009–2021: Police SC
- 2013: Kandurata Maroons
- 2013: Chittagong Kings
- 2015: Sylhet Super Stars
- 2016–2021: Chilaw Marians
- 2020: Galle Gladiators
- 2021–present: Kingsmen X
- 2023–present: Seattle Orcas
- 2025–present: Panadura SC
- 2025–present: Biratnagar Kings

Career statistics
Competition	ODI	T20I	FC	LA
Matches	12	18	89	140
Runs scored	195	241	6,072	4,432
Batting average	21.66	15.06	43.06	36.93
100s/50s	0/1	0/0	14/33	9/28
Top score	96	40	237	161
Balls bowled	312	137	9,431	5,006
Wickets	3	3	200	116
Bowling average	92.33	71.00	26.57	32.61
5 wickets in innings	0	0	9	2
10 wickets in match	0	0	1	0
Best bowling	1/15	1/11	7/22	5/35
Catches/stumpings	1/–	4/–	60/–	42/–
Medal record
Men's cricket
Representing Sri Lanka
Asian Games
Gold medal – first place	2014 Incheon	Team
- Source: ESPNcricinfo, May 16, 2026

Gampalage Shehan Naveendra De Fonseka Gunawarna Jayasuriya, or commonly Shehan Jayasuriya (Sinhala: ශෙහාන් ජයසූරිය; born September 12, 1991), is a Sri Lankan-born international cricketer who plays for the United States national cricket team as a batting all-rounder. He is a quick-scoring left-handed batsman and a right-arm off-break bowler.

Shehan previously represented the Sri Lanka national cricket team between 2015 and 2020 and was a member of the Sri Lankan team that won the gold medal at the 2014 Asian Games.

== Early and personal life ==
Shehan was born in Colombo, and attended Prince of Wales' College, Moratuwa.

He married Sri Lankan actress Kaveesha Kavindi on September 23, 2020, in New York, US. She is the daughter of Sri Lankan former actress Dilani Abeywardana.

== Domestic career ==
Shehan made his first-class cricket debut in October 2009 for Police Sports Club against Moratuwa Sports Club. His highest first-class score is 237, which he made off 218 balls for Chilaw Marians in their 378-run victory over Bloomfield in 2016–17. In 2017–18, against Ragama, he opened both batting and bowling and dominated the match, taking 7 for 22 and 3 for 66 and scoring 80 in an innings victory; no other batsman in the match reached 40.

In March 2018, he was named in Colombo's squad for the 2017–18 Super Four Provincial Tournament. The following month, he was also named in Colombo's squad for the 2018 Super Provincial One Day Tournament. He was the leading run-scorer for Colombo in the tournament, with 326 runs in seven matches, and was named as the player of the series.

In August 2018, he was named in Colombo's squad the 2018 SLC T20 League. In February 2019, Sri Lanka Cricket named him as the Player of the Tournament for the 2017–18 Premier Limited Overs Tournament. In March 2019, he was named in Colombo's squad for the 2019 Super Provincial One Day Tournament.

In January 2020, in the opening round of matches in the 2019–20 SLC Twenty20 Tournament, he scored a century for Chilaw Marians Cricket Club. He finished the tournament as the leading run-scorer in the competition, with 385 runs in eight matches.

In October 2020, he was drafted by the Galle Gladiators for the inaugural edition of the Lanka Premier League.

In June 2021, he was selected to take part in the Minor League Cricket tournament with the Silicon Valley Strikers following the players' draft.

In July 2023, he joined the Seattle Orcas for the inaugural season of Major League Cricket and played for them from 2023 to 2024.

== International career ==
=== Sri Lanka (2015–2020) ===
As an all-rounder, Shehan made his Twenty20 International debut for (T20I) Sri Lanka against Pakistan on August 1, 2015. He scored 40 runs off 32 balls including 3 fours and 2 sixes on his debut and took his first international wicket by bowling Shahid Afridi out. However, the match ended with a defeat for Sri Lanka. He made his One Day International (ODI) debut for Sri Lanka against the West Indies on November 1, 2015; he got out for no runs, being bowled by Sunil Narine.

In August 2019, he was named in a twenty-two man squad for Sri Lanka's Test series against New Zealand. However, he was not named in the final fifteen-man squad for the first Test. He was included to the T20I series against New Zealand in September 2019. He played in first two T20I with modest results. In the last over of second T20I, he had a collision with Kusal Mendis at the boundary line. In September 2019, he successfully got the spot in Sri Lanka's T20I squad for the series against Pakistan.

During the second ODI against Pakistan on September 30, 2019; he scored his maiden ODI half century. He got out for 96 runs in the match. However, along with Dasun Shanaka, they put up a record sixth-wicket stand of 177. This is the highest partnership against Pakistan in ODIs. However, Sri Lanka lost the match by 67 runs.

He announced his retirement from Sri Lankan cricket on January 8, 2021, as he decided to relocate to the United States with his family.

=== United States (2026–present) ===
In January 2026, Shehan was named in the United States' 15-member squad for the 2026 T20 World Cup.

== Note ==
- Shehan Jayasuriya is not related in any way to former Sri Lankan cricket captain, Sanath Jayasuriya.
