= Nuwan Liyanapathirana =

Sri Lankan cricketer (born 1987)

Personal information
- Born: 22 May 1987 (age 39); Matale, Sri Lanka
- Source: ESPNcricinfo, 7 January 2017

Nuwan Liyanapathirana (born 22 May 1987) is a Sri Lankan cricketer. He made his first-class debut for Sri Lanka Army Sports Club in the 2008–09 Premier Trophy on 16 January 2009.
