= Dilhan Cooray =

Sri Lankan cricketer (born 1987)

Personal information
- Born: 10 March 1987 (age 39); Colombo, Sri Lanka
- Source: ESPNcricinfo, 9 December 2016

Dilhan Cooray (born 10 March 1987) is a Sri Lankan cricketer. He made his first-class debut for Badureliya Sports Club in the 2006–07 Premier Trophy on 12 January 2007. In April 2018, he was named in Colombo's squad for the 2018 Super Provincial One Day Tournament.

On 28 March 2021, in the 2020–21 Major Clubs Limited Over Tournament match between Sri Lanka Army Sports Club and Bloomfield Cricket and Athletic Club, Army Sports Club's captain Thisara Perera hit six sixes in one over off Cooray's bowling.
