= Navindu Vithanage =

Sri Lankan cricketer (born 1998)

- thumb

Personal information
- Full name: Kehelkahaduwa Vithanage Navindu Nirmal
- Born: 18 June 1998 (age 28); Galle, Sri Lanka

Domestic team information
- Years: Team
- 2015: Galle Cricket Club (squad no. 2016)
- Saracens Sports club
- Source: Cricinfo, 15 March 2017

Navindu Vithanage (born 18 June 1998) is a Sri Lankan cricketer. He made his first-class debut for Galle Cricket Club in the 2015–16 Premier League Tournament on 11 December 2015.
