= Rashmika Dilshan =

Sri Lankan cricketer (born 1998)

Personal information
- Born: 10 October 1998 (age 28)
- Source: Cricinfo, 11 May 2018

Rashmika Dilshan (born 10 October 1998) is a Sri Lankan cricketer. In April 2018, he was named in Dambulla's squad for the 2018 Super Provincial One Day Tournament. He made his List A debut for Dambulla in the 2018 Super Provincial One Day Tournament on 11 May 2018. Prior to his List A debut, he was named in Sri Lanka's squad for the 2018 Under-19 Cricket World Cup.

In August 2018, he was named in Colombo's squad the 2018 SLC T20 League.
