= Nisala Tharaka =

Sri Lankan cricketer

Personal information
- Full name: Kottawa Gamage Nisala Tharaka Gamage
- Born: 20 April 1991 (age 35); Galle, Sri Lanka
- Height: 5 ft 7 in (1.70 m)
- Batting: Right-handed
- Bowling: Right-arm medium fast
- Role: Bowler

Domestic team information
- Years: Team
- 2011: Antonians Sports Club
- 2011: Ragama Cricket Club
- 2011/12: Lankan Cricket Club
- 2012/13: Sri Lanka Ports Authority Cricket Club
- 2013/14–2015/16: Tamil Union Cricket and Athletic Club
- 2017–2020: Colts Cricket Club
- 2020/21: Negombo Cricket Club
- 2021: Police Sports Club
- 2022–2025: Sinhalese Sports Club
- Source: ESPNcricinfo, 16 January 2017

Nisala Tharaka (born 20 April 1991) is a Sri Lankan cricketer. He made his first-class debut for Ragama Cricket Club in the 2010–11 Premier Trophy on 6 May 2011.

In March 2018, he was named in Galle's squad for the 2017–18 Super Four Provincial Tournament. He was the leading wicket-taker for the tournament, with eleven dismissals in three matches. The following month, he was also named in Galle's squad for the 2018 Super Provincial One Day Tournament. In August 2018, he was named in Kandy's squad the 2018 SLC T20 League.

He was the leading wicket-taker for Colts Cricket Club in the 2018–19 Premier League Tournament, with 22 dismissals in nine matches. In March 2022, he was signed by Killyclooney Cricket Club to play domestic cricket in Ireland. In June 2022, he was named in the Sri Lanka A squad for their matches against Australia A during Australia's tour of Sri Lanka.

In October 2025, he signed for Cumbria Cricket League side Keswick Cricket Club.

== International career ==
Nisala made his debut call-up for the national side when he was included in an 18-player squad for the Sri Lankan tour of England in 2024.
