= Mohamed Dilshad =

Sri Lankan cricketer (born 1992)

Personal information
- Full name: Mohamed Nihar Mohamed Dilshad
- Born: 30 April 1992 (age 34); Kandy, Sri Lanka
- Bowling: Left Arm Fast Medium
- Role: Bowler
- Source: Cricinfo, 23 December 2017

Mohamed Dilshad (born 30 April 1992) is a Sri Lankan cricketer. He made his first-class debut for Panadura Sports Club in the 2012–13 Premier League Tournament on 22 February 2013.

In March 2018, he was named in Galle's squad for the 2017–18 Super Four Provincial Tournament. The following month, he was also named in Galle's squad for the 2018 Super Provincial One Day Tournament.

In August 2018, he was named in Galle's squad the 2018 SLC T20 League. In January 2020, in the opening round of matches in the 2019–20 SLC Twenty20 Tournament, he took a five-wicket haul for Saracens Sports Club.
