= Kavishka Anjula =

Sri Lankan cricketer (born 1997)

Personal information
- Born: 23 September 1997 (age 29)
Medal record
Men's Cricket
Representing Sri Lanka
South Asian Games
Silver medal – second place	2019 Kathmandu/Pokhara	Team
- Source: Cricinfo, 9 December 2017

Kavishka Anjula (born 23 September 1997) is a Sri Lankan cricketer. He made his first-class debut for Colts Cricket Club in the 2017–18 Premier League Tournament on 8 December 2017. He made his Twenty20 debut for Colts Cricket Club in the 2017–18 SLC Twenty20 Tournament on 24 February 2018. He made his List A debut for Colts Cricket Club in the 2017–18 Premier Limited Overs Tournament on 10 March 2018.

In March 2018, he was named in Colombo's squad for the 2017–18 Super Four Provincial Tournament. In November 2019, he was named in Sri Lanka's squad for the men's cricket tournament at the 2019 South Asian Games. The Sri Lanka team won the silver medal, after they lost to Bangladesh by seven wickets in the final.

In October 2020, he was drafted by the Kandy Tuskers for the inaugural edition of the Lanka Premier League.
