= Hasitha Boyagoda =

Sri Lankan cricketer (born 1998)

Personal information
- Born: 21 December 1998 (age 27)
- Batting: Right-handed
- Bowling: Right-arm off-spin
- Role: Opening batsman
Medal record
Men's Cricket
Representing Sri Lanka
South Asian Games
Silver medal – second place	2019 Kathmandu/Pokhara	Team
- Source: Cricinfo, 17 May 2018

Hasitha Boyagoda (born 21 December 1998) is a Sri Lankan cricketer. In April 2018, he was named in Kandy's squad for the 2018 Super Provincial One Day Tournament. He made his List A debut for Kandy in the 2018 Super Provincial One Day Tournament on 17 May 2018.

Prior to his List A debut, he was named in Sri Lanka's squad for the 2018 Under-19 Cricket World Cup. In the Under-19 World Cup, he scored 191 runs against Kenya, the highest total in an U19 match. Following the tournament, the International Cricket Council (ICC) named him as the rising star of the squad.

He made his Twenty20 debut for Dambulla on 21 August 2018 in the 2018 SLC T20 League tournament. He made his first-class debut for Nondescripts Cricket Club in the 2018–19 Premier League Tournament on 30 November 2018. The following month, he was named in Sri Lanka team for the 2018 ACC Emerging Teams Asia Cup.

On 21 April 2019, Boyagoda was having breakfast in the Shangri-La Hotel in Colombo, when a bomb exploded in the building. He escaped with only minor injuries. In November 2019, he was named in Sri Lanka's squad for the 2019 ACC Emerging Teams Asia Cup in Bangladesh. Later the same month, he was named in Sri Lanka's squad for the men's cricket tournament at the 2019 South Asian Games. The Sri Lanka team won the silver medal, after they lost to Bangladesh by seven wickets in the final.
