= Lasith Abeyratne =

Sri Lankan cricketer (born 1993)

Personal information
- Born: 23 May 1993 (age 32); Colombo, Sri Lanka
- Batting: Right-handed
- Bowling: Right-arm off-break
- Role: Wicket-keeper
- Source: ESPNcricinfo, 22 April 2016

Lasith Abeyratne (born 23 May 1993) is a Sri Lankan first-class cricketer. He is a right-handed wicket-keeper batsman.

Lasith Abeyratne along with Roshan Anurudda holds the record 7th wicket partnership in any forms of T20 cricket, with 107 not out.

In March 2018, he was named in Colombo's squad for the 2017–18 Super Four Provincial Tournament. The following month, he was also named in Colombo's squad for the 2018 Super Provincial One Day Tournament.

In August 2018, he was named in Colombo's squad the 2018 SLC T20 League. In August 2021, he was named in the SLC Reds team for the 2021 SLC Invitational T20 League tournament. In July 2022, he was signed by the Kandy Falcons for the third edition of the Lanka Premier League.
