= Shashin Dilranga =

Sri Lankan cricketer (born 1994)

Personal information
- Full name: Weerasinghe Mudiyanselage Shashin Dilranga
- Born: 28 November 1994 (age 31); Colombo, Sri Lanka
- Source: ESPNcricinfo, 8 January 2017

Shashin Dilranga (born 28 November 1994) is a Sri Lankan cricketer. He made his first-class debut for Burgher Recreation Club in the 2016–17 Premier League Tournament on 6 January 2017. He made his Twenty20 debut for Burgher Recreation Club in the 2017–18 SLC Twenty20 Tournament on 24 February 2018. He made his List A debut for Burgher Recreation Club in the 2017–18 Premier Limited Overs Tournament on 10 March 2018.
