= Janaka Sampath =

Sri Lankan cricketer (born 1987)

Personal information
- Full name: Janaka Sampath Perera
- Born: 25 December 1987 (age 38)
- Source: Cricinfo, 7 January 2018

Janaka Sampath Perera (born 25 December 1987) is a Sri Lankan cricketer. He made his first-class debut for Badureliya Sports Club in the 2008–09 Premier Trophy on 30 January 2009. In August 2018, he was named in Kandy's squad the 2018 SLC T20 League.
