= Shammu Ashan =

Sri Lankan cricketer (born 1998)

Personal information
- Born: 9 January 1998 (age 28); Colombo, Sri Lanka
- Batting: Right handed
- Bowling: Right arm offbreak bowler
- Role: Top-order batsman

Career statistics
Competition	FC	LA	T20
Matches	54	87	52
Runs scored	2,777	2,077	574
Batting average	38.04	32.45	17.39
100s/50s	4/18	3/12	0/1
Top score	144	112*	53
Balls bowled	1,924	1,454	264
Wickets	33	30	10
Bowling average	35.51	39.26	27.10
5 wickets in innings	0	0	0
10 wickets in match	0	0	0
Best bowling	2/9	4/63	4/21
Catches/stumpings	32/–	27/–	13/–
Medal record
Men's cricket
Representing Sri Lanka
ACC Emerging Asia Cup
Winner	2018 Pakistan-SriLanka
South Asian Games
Silver medal – second place	2019 Nepal
- Source: Cricinfo, 28 March 2025

Shammu Ashan (born 9 January 1998) is a Sri Lankan cricketer. He made his List A debut for Sri Lanka A against West Indies A on 27 October 2016. Prior to his List A debut he was part of Sri Lanka's squad for the 2016 Under-19 Cricket World Cup.

He made his both his first-class debut for Sinhalese Sports Club in the 2016–17 Premier League Tournament on 28 December 2016. He made his Twenty20 debut for Sinhalese Sports Club in the 2017–18 SLC Twenty20 Tournament on 24 February 2018.

In March 2018, he was named in Galle's squad for the 2017–18 Super Four Provincial Tournament. The following month, he was also named in Galle's squad for the 2018 Super Provincial One Day Tournament. In August 2018, he was named in Colombo's squad the 2018 SLC T20 League. In the same month, Sri Lanka Cricket named him in a preliminary squad of 31 players for the 2018 Asia Cup.

In December 2018, he was named in the Sri Lanka team for the 2018 ACC Emerging Teams Asia Cup. In March 2019, he was named in Galle's squad for the 2019 Super Provincial One Day Tournament. In November 2019, he was named in both Sri Lanka's squad for the 2019 ACC Emerging Teams Asia Cup in Bangladesh, and for the men's cricket tournament at the 2019 South Asian Games. The Sri Lanka team won the silver medal at the latter event, losing to Bangladesh by seven wickets in the final.

In March 2021, he was part of the Sinhalese Sports Club team that won the 2020–21 SLC Twenty20 Tournament, the first time they had won the tournament since 2005. In August 2021, he was named in the SLC Greens team for the 2021 SLC Invitational T20 League tournament. In July 2022, he was signed by the Galle Gladiators for the third edition of the Lanka Premier League.
