= Gamini Dissanayake (umpire) =

Sri Lankan cricket umprie (born 1964)

Personal information
- Born: 8 April 1964 (age 62)
- Role: Umpire

Umpiring information
- WODIs umpired: 4 (1999–2023)
- WT20Is umpired: 4 (2010–2018)
- Source: Cricinfo, 21 March 2018

Gamini Dissanayake (born 8 April 1964) is a Sri Lankan cricket umpire. In 2010, he was one of the umpires in a tour match during India's tour of Sri Lanka and for one of the matches during a Twenty20 quadrangular series, also in Sri Lanka. In 2013, he was one of three Sri Lankan umpires caught in a sting operation, resulting him being downgraded from the top umpire's panel for one year.

He has umpired in domestic matches in cricket tournaments in Sri Lanka, such as the 2017–18 SLC Twenty20 Tournament and the 2017–18 Premier League Tournament. In March 2018, he was one of the two onfield umpires for the quarterfinal match between Chilaw Marians Cricket Club and Burgher Recreation Club in the 2017–18 Premier Limited Overs Tournament.
