= Kasun Rajitha =

Sri Lankan cricketer (born 1993)

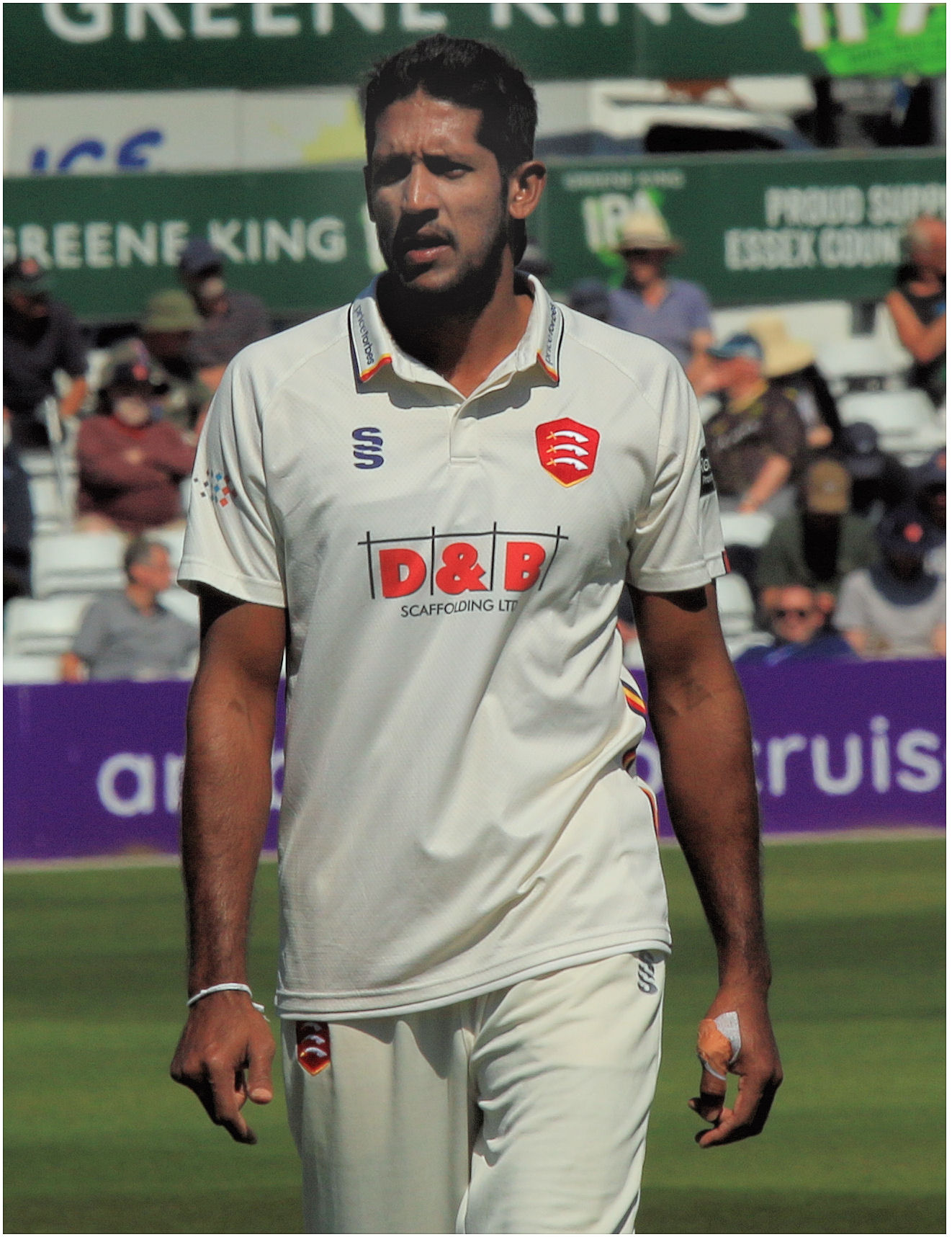
- Rajitha playing for Essex in 2025

Personal information
- Full name: Chandrasekara Arachchilage Kasun Rajitha
- Born: 1 June 1993 (age 33); Matara, Sri Lanka
- Height: 1.94 m (6 ft 4 in)
- Batting: Right-handed
- Bowling: Right arm medium-fast
- Role: Bowler

International information
- National side: Sri Lanka (2016–present)
- Test debut (cap 146): 14 June 2018 v West Indies
- Last Test: 22 March 2024 v Bangladesh
- ODI debut (cap 188): 1 August 2018 v South Africa
- Last ODI: 6 November 2023 v Bangladesh
- ODI shirt no.: 65
- T20I debut (cap 62): 9 February 2016 v India
- Last T20I: 8 April 2023 v New Zealand
- T20I shirt no.: 65

Domestic team information
- Years: Team
- 2017–present: Badureliya Sports Club
- 2023: Khulna Tigers
- 2025: Essex

Career statistics
Competition	Test	ODI	T20I	FC
Matches	18	34	18	80
Runs scored	133	117	31	662
Batting average	7.00	9.75	9.75	9.73
100s/50s	0/0	0/0	0/0	0/1
Top score	22	33	9*	52
Balls bowled	2,996	1,527	396	11,465
Wickets	55	43	17	225
Bowling average	29.58	36.11	36.17	32.27
5 wickets in innings	2	0	0	12
10 wickets in match	0	0	0	1
Best bowling	5/56	4/50	3/29	8/31
Catches/stumpings	8/–	5/–	1/–	25/–
- Source: Cricinfo, 26 May 2025

Chandrasekara Arachchilage Kasun Rajitha (born 1 June 1993) is a professional Sri Lankan cricketer, who plays all formats of the game at the international level for Sri Lanka. He is an old boy of St. Servatius' College, Matara.

== Personal life ==
Rajitha's mother is a former director of education and father a retired Grama Niladhari. His brother and sister are both graduates. Kasun is married to his longtime partner Chamaththi.

== Early and domestic career ==
He played in the tour match between Sri Lanka Board President's XI vs Indian national cricket team in August 2015.

In March 2018, he was named in Kandy's squad for the 2017–18 Super Four Provincial Tournament. He was the leading wicket-taker for Kandy during the tournament, with ten dismissals in two matches. The following month, he was also named in Kandy's squad for the 2018 Super Provincial One Day Tournament.

In August 2018, he was named in Galle's squad the 2018 SLC T20 League. He was the leading wicket-taker in the tournament, finishing with thirteen dismissals in six matches. In March 2019, he was named in Kandy's squad for the 2019 Super Provincial One Day Tournament. In October 2020, he was drafted by the Dambulla Viiking for the inaugural edition of the Lanka Premier League.

In April 2025, he signed for Essex County Cricket Club to play five games of their County Championship campaign.

== International career ==
He made his Twenty20 International (T20I) debut for Sri Lanka against India on 9 February 2016. He took the wickets of two Indian top order batsmen in his very first over. At the end, with the help of other seamers, India were all out for 101 and Sri Lanka won the match comfortably to lead the 3 match series 1–0. For his bowling performance of 3 for 29 runs, Rajitha won man of the match. With this victory, Sri Lanka regained the number one spot in the T20I rankings.

In May 2018, he was named in Sri Lanka's Test squad for their series against the West Indies. He made his Test debut for Sri Lanka against the West Indies on 14 June 2018. He took his first Test wicket by dismissing Kraigg Brathwaite.

In July 2018, he was named in Sri Lanka's One Day International (ODI) squad for their series against South Africa. He made his ODI debut for Sri Lanka against South Africa on 1 August 2018. He took his first ODI wicket by dismissing Quinton de Kock.

In March 2019, during the fourth ODI against South Africa, Rajitha and Isuru Udana made the highest partnership for the tenth wicket for Sri Lanka in an ODI match, with 58 runs. However, Rajitha did not score any runs in the partnership, finishing the innings not out without scoring.

In June 2019, he was added to Sri Lanka's squad for the 2019 Cricket World Cup, for the team's last two matches of the tournament. He replaced Nuwan Pradeep, who had contracted chickenpox. On 27 October 2019, in the first T20I match against Australia, Rajitha conceded 75 runs from his four overs, and were the most expensive bowling figures in a T20I match.

In May 2022, in the second match against Bangladesh, Rajitha took his first five-wicket haul in Test cricket, with 5/64.
