= Nipun Karunanayake =

Sri Lankan cricketer (born 1991)

Personal information
- Born: 11 January 1991 (age 35); Ragama, Sri Lanka
- Source: Cricinfo, 3 February 2016

Nipun Karunanayake (born 11 January 1991) is a Sri Lankan first-class cricketer who plays for Bloomfield Cricket and Athletic Club. Nipun was educated at Nalanda College, Colombo and captained the first XI team in 2009.

In March 2018, he was named in Dambulla's squad for the 2017–18 Super Four Provincial Tournament. The following month, he was also named in Dambulla's squad for the 2018 Super Provincial One Day Tournament.

In August 2018, he was named in Dambulla's squad the 2018 SLC T20 League.
