= Irosh Samarasooriya =

Sri Lankan cricketer (born 1991)

Personal information
- Full name: Irosh Sohan Sithija Samarasooriya
- Born: 3 March 1991 (age 35); Galle, Sri Lanka
- Batting: Right-handed
- Bowling: Right-arm medium-fast

Domestic team information
- Years: Team
- 2011–2016: Moors Sports Club
- 2012–2013: Galle Cricket Club
- 2017–present: North West Warriors

Career statistics
Competition	FC	LA	T20
Matches	53	31	12
Runs scored	2,472	394	41
Batting average	30.51	17.13	4.10
100s/50s	5/13	0/1	0/0
Top score	147	77	16
Balls bowled	1,786	474	42
Wickets	25	7	2
Bowling average	52.04	69.71	24.50
5 wickets in innings	0	0	0
10 wickets in match	0	0	0
Best bowling	4/58	2/51	1/7
Catches/stumpings	34/–	12/–	2/–
- Source: ESPNcricinfo, 22 July 2017

Irosh Sohan Sithija Samarasooriya (born 3 March 1991) is a Sri Lankan cricketer. He made his first-class debut for Moors Sports Club in the 2010–11 Premier Trophy on 18 February 2011. In 2017, he played for North West Warriors in the 2017 Inter-Provincial Cup.

In April 2018, Samarasooriya was named in Galle's squad for the 2018 Super Provincial One Day Tournament. In August 2018, he was named in Dambulla's squad the 2018 SLC T20 League. On 12 January 2020, he scored an unbeaten 108 from 59 balls for Nugegoda Sports and Welfare Club in the 2019–20 SLC Twenty20 Tournament.
