= Thikshila de Silva =

Sri Lankan cricketer (born 1993)

Personal information
- Full name: Sammu Nirwantha Thikshila de Silva
- Born: 16 December 1993 (age 32); Galle, Sri Lanka
- Batting: Left-handed
- Bowling: Right-arm fast-medium
- Role: All-rounder

International information
- National side: Sri Lanka (2017-present)
- T20I debut (cap 68): 20 January 2017 v South Africa
- Last T20I: 25 January 2017 v South Africa
- T20I shirt no.: 27

Domestic team information
- Years: Team
- 2015–present: Chilaw Marians Cricket Club
- 2020: Colombo Kings

Career statistics
Competition	T20I	FC	LA	T20
Matches	3	52	54	59
Runs scored	3	1,983	1,184	953
Batting average	1.50	24.78	25.19	18.68
100s/50s	0/0	1/11	1/6	0/5
Top score	3	119*	106*	72
Balls bowled	6	3,650	1,576	626
Wickets	0	63	49	38
Bowling average	–	37.42	25.61	22.15
5 wickets in innings	–	0	1	1
10 wickets in match	–	0	0	0
Best bowling	–	4/42	5/42	5/30
Catches/stumpings	0/–	33/–	14/–	17/–
- Source: ESPNcricinfo, 17 August 2022

Sammu Nirwantha Thikshila de Silva, or commonly as Thikshila de Silva (born 16 December 1993) is a professional Sri Lankan cricketer. He is a past student of Devapathiraja College, Ragama, and Mahinda College, Galle.

== Domestic career ==
He made his first-class debut for Chilaw Marians Cricket Club in the 2014–15 Premier Trophy on 20 February 2015.

In April 2018, he was named in Colombo's squad for the 2018 Super Provincial One Day Tournament. In August 2018, he was named in Kandy's squad the 2018 SLC T20 League. In October 2020, he was drafted by the Colombo Kings for the inaugural edition of the Lanka Premier League.

== International career ==
In January 2017 he was named in Sri Lanka's Twenty20 International (T20I) squad for their series against South Africa. He made his T20I debut for Sri Lanka against South Africa on 20 January 2017. Later the same month he was named in Sri Lanka's One Day International (ODI) squad, also for their series against South Africa. But the day before the opening ODI, he was dismissed from the team.
