= Pradeep Udawatta =

Sri Lankan cricketer (born 1971)

Personal information
- Born: 12 June 1971 (age 55); Kalubowila, Sri Lanka

Umpiring information
- WODIs umpired: 4 (2008–2019)
- WT20Is umpired: 4 (2015–2018)
- Source: ESPNcricinfo, 9 November 2016

Pradeep Udawatta (born 12 June 1971) is a Sri Lankan former first-class cricketer. He made his Twenty20 debut on 17 August 2004, for Sri Lanka Police Sports Club in the 2004 SLC Twenty20 Tournament. He is now an umpire and stood in matches between Sri Lanka women and England women in November 2016.
