= Chilaw Marians Cricket Club =

Sri Lankan cricket team

Personnel
- Captain: (Sri Lanka) Pulina Tharanga
- Coach: (Sri Lanka) Sarath Jayawardena

Team information
- Colours: Cream/pink
- Founded: 1975
- Home ground: FTZ Sports Complex
- Capacity: 1,000

History
- First-class debut: in 2000
- Premier League Tournament wins: 2
- Premier Limited Overs Tournament wins: 0
- Twenty20 Tournament wins: 1 (2004)
- Official website: www.chilawmarians.com

Chilaw Marians Cricket Club are a first-class cricket team based in Chilaw, Sri Lanka. They play their home games at FTZ Sports Complex. The club has won the Premier League one day Tournament in 2005. More successful in limited overs cricket, Chilaw reached the final of the International 20:20 Club Championship in 2005.

== History ==
Chilaw Marians Cricket Club was founded in 1975 under the guidance of Rev. Brother Edwin Ambross who at the time was the Principal of St. Mary’s College, Chilaw, together with a group of cricket loving enthusiasts, namely Shanthi Seneviratne, Edward Gamini, Dinesh Fernando, Rohan Fernandopulle and Bertram Navaratne. Starting at the lowest divisions of club cricket in the 1980s, Chilaw Marians CC progressed through the ranks to reach BCCSL Division III.

In the mid-1990s under the leadership of Irwin Fernando and Godfrey Dabrera, the committee formulated plans to take the club to the next level of club cricket – BCCSL Division II. In 1998 Chilaw Marians was able to secure their first title, becoming BCCSL Under 23 Division II Champions. Encouraged by this achievement, the club set its sights on the pinnacle of 1st class cricket in Sri Lanka – Division I. In 2000 Chilaw Marians won the Premier Division I Qualifying Championship and were promoted to the highest level of club cricket in Sri Lanka.

== Current squad ==
Players with international caps are listed in bold. Updated as of 23 July 2022

Name	Age	Batting style	Bowling style	Notes
Batsmen
Kasun Vidura	32	Left-handed	Slow left-arm orthodox	
Dilshan Sanjeewa	27	Left-handed	Right-arm leg spin	
Anuj Jotin	36	Right-handed	Right-arm medium-fast	(India) Overseas player
Harindu Jayasekera	22	Left-handed	Right-arm off spin	
All-rounders
Pulina Tharanga	32	Right-handed	Right-arm leg spin	Captain
Raveen Yasas	26	Left-handed	Slow left-arm orthodox	
**Thikshila de Silva**	31	Left-handed	Right-arm medium	
Gaurav Jathar	34	Right-handed	Slow left-arm orthodox	(India) Overseas player
Kavindu Dilhara	24	Right-handed	Right-arm medium	
Chamod Sandaru	24	Right-handed	Right-arm off spin	
Kemira Wijenayake	24	Right-handed	Right-arm off spin	
Wicket-keeper
Irosh Fernando	26	Left-handed		Vice-captain
Spin Bowlers
Avindu Theekshana	27	Left-handed	Slow left-arm unorthodox	
Sheshan Silva	26	Right-handed	Right-arm off spin	
Pace Bowlers
Charuka Tharindu	24	Right-handed	Right-arm fast-medium	
Charith Jayampathi	34	Left-handed	Left-arm medium-fast	

== See also ==
- List of Chilaw Marians Cricket Club players
