= 2016–17 Premier League Tournament =

Cricket tournament

- Dates: 29 November 2016 – 17 February 2017
- Administrator: Sri Lanka Cricket
- Cricket format: First-class cricket
- Tournament format: Round-robin then knockout
- Host: Sri Lanka
- Champions: Sinhalese Sports Club (32nd title)
- Participants: 14
- Most runs: Sadeera Samarawickrama (1,016)
- Most wickets: Malinda Pushpakumara (77)

The 2016–17 Premier League Tournament was the 29th season of first-class cricket in Sri Lanka's Premier Trophy. Fourteen teams competed, split into two groups of seven. Burgher Recreation Club replaced Sri Lanka Ports Authority Cricket Club, who were relegated at the end of the previous year's tournament, after finishing bottom of the Plate League. Sinhalese Sports Club won the competition.

== Teams ==
The following teams competed:

Group A

- Badureliya Sports Club
- Bloomfield Cricket and Athletic Club
- Chilaw Marians Cricket Club
- Galle Cricket Club
- Nondescripts Cricket Club
- Sinhalese Sports Club
- Tamil Union Cricket and Athletic Club

Group B

- Burgher Recreation Club
- Colombo Cricket Club
- Colts Cricket Club
- Moors Sports Club
- Ragama Cricket Club
- Saracens Sports Club
- Sri Lanka Army Sports Club

== Fixtures ==
=== Group A ===
2–4 December 2016
Scorecard

| Chilaw Marians Cricket Club | v | Badureliya Sports Club |
| 235 (79.3 overs); Mahela Udawatte 69 (109); Alankara Asanka Silva 5/102 (28.3 overs) | | 113 (44 overs); Shehan Fernando 25 (29); Malinda Pushpakumara 6/41 (22 overs) |
| 262/7d (59.2 overs); Mahela Udawatte 73 (106); Alankara Asanka Silva 4/104 (24.2 overs) | | 93 (25.1 overs); Pramud Hettiwatte 30 (32); Maduka Liyanapathiranage 6/36 (10.1 overs) |

Chilaw Marians Cricket Club won by 291 runs
FTZ Sports Complex, Katunayake
Umpires: Nilan de Silva and Ruchira Palliyaguruge

- Chilaw Marians Cricket Club won the toss and elected to bat.
- Pramud Hettiwatte (Badureliya Sports Club) made his first-class debut.

2–4 December 2016
Scorecard

| Sinhalese Sports Club | v | Tamil Union Cricket and Athletic Club |
| 503 (127.4 overs); Dimuth Karunaratne 149 (225); Pulina Tharanga 2/67 (14 overs) | | 460 (121.5 overs); Kithuruwan Vithanage 125 (184); Jeffrey Vandersay 5/110 (32 overs) |
| 51/1 (13.4 overs); Kaushal Silva 27* (39); Dinuk Wikramanayaka 1/18 (3.4 overs) |

Match drawn
P Sara Oval, Colombo
Umpires: Deepal Gunawardene and Saman Jayamahamudali

- Tamil Union Cricket and Athletic Club won the toss and elected to field.
- Disnaka Manoj (Tamil Union Cricket and Athletic Club) made his first-class debut.

3–5 December 2016
Scorecard

| Nondescripts Cricket Club | v | Bloomfield Cricket and Athletic Club |
| 443/9d (84 overs); Niroshan Dickwella 183 (155); Malith de Silva 5/83 (23 overs) | | 200 (64.4 overs); Aloka Amarasiri 87* (108); Tharindu Kaushal 3/73 (20.4 overs) |
| 104/1 (9.3 overs); Sandun Weerakkody 64* (28); Imran Khan 1/32 (3.3 overs) | | 346 (99.1 overs) (f/o); Nipun Karunanayake 124 (190); Tharindu Kaushal 5/132 (35.1 overs) |

Nondescripts Cricket Club won by 9 wickets
Nondescripts Cricket Club Ground, Colombo
Umpires: Gamini Dissanayake and Ranganath Prasanna

- Bloomfield Cricket and Athletic Club won the toss and elected to field.
- Malith de Silva, Thiran Dhanapala, Lahiru Fernando, Nisal Francisco, Lahiru Jayakody and Sacha De Alwis (Bloomfield Cricket and Athletic Club) all made their first-class debuts.

8–10 December 2016
Scorecard

| Galle Cricket Club | v | Tamil Union Cricket and Athletic Club |
| 352 (111.3 overs); Dilhan Cooray 86 (170); Jeevan Mendis 4/87 (28 overs) | | 338 (109.5 overs); Sithara Gimhan 127 (228); Roshan Jayatissa 5/101 (36 overs) |
| 189/5 (49 overs); Nilushan Nonis 43 (94); Dinuk Wikramanayaka 2/27 (9 overs) |

Match drawn
Galle International Stadium, Galle
Umpires: Asanga Jayasooriya and Rohitha Kottahachchi

- Galle Cricket Club won the toss and elected to bat.

9–11 December 2016
Scorecard

| Nondescripts Cricket Club | v | Chilaw Marians Cricket Club |
| 385 (88.1 overs); Sandun Weerakkody 113 (122); Malinda Pushpakumara 4/74 (21 overs) | | 285 (68.3 overs); Mahela Udawatte 89 (118); Tharindu Kaushal 6/78 (24 overs) |
| 199 (50.4 overs); Chaturanga de Silva 47 (53); Maduka Liyanapathiranage 4/54 (11 overs) | | 193/9 (56 overs); Arosh Janoda 40 (33); Tharindu Kaushal 5/53 (18 overs) |

Match drawn
Nondescripts Cricket Club Ground, Colombo
Umpires: Hemantha Boteju and Ruchira Palliyaguruge

- Nondescripts Cricket Club won the toss and elected to bat.

9–11 December 2016
Scorecard

| Badureliya Sports Club | v | Bloomfield Cricket and Athletic Club |
| 156 (51 overs); Vishva Wijeratne 47 (96); Malith de Silva 5/41 (21 overs) | | 233 (68.1 overs); Nipun Karunanayake 108 (163); Alankara Asanka Silva 4/50 (22.1 overs) |
| 337/7d (71.5 overs); Shehan Fernando 86 (85); Malith de Silva 4/112 (27 overs) | | 248/6 (67.3 overs); Nisal Francisco 88 (137); Alankara Asanka Silva 4/91 (30 overs) |

Match drawn
Bloomfield Cricket and Athletic Club Ground, Colombo
Umpires: Deepal Gunawardene and Prageeth Rambukwella

- Bloomfield Cricket and Athletic Club won the toss and elected to field.
- Lakkana Jayasekera, Duvindu Tillakaratne (Badureliya Sports Club); Tharindu Karunaratne and Taneesha Weerakoon (Bloomfield Cricket and Athletic Club) all made their first-class debuts.

15–17 December 2016
Scorecard

| Tamil Union Cricket and Athletic Club | v | Chilaw Marians Cricket Club |
| 450 (101.5 overs); Jeevan Mendis 115 (157); Malinda Pushpakumara 5/134 (26.5 overs) | | 219 (42.1 overs); Thikshila de Silva 59 (28); Jeevan Mendis 4/79 (16 overs) |
| 69/4 (15.3 overs); Pulina Tharanga 28* (19); Malinda Pushpakumara 3/24 (8 overs) | | 297 (84.2 overs) (f/o); Shehan Jayasuriya 67 (60); Jeevan Mendis 4/56 (23.2 overs) |

Tamil Union Cricket and Athletic Club won by 6 wickets
FTZ Sports Complex, Katunayake
Umpires: Jayantha de Silva and Gamini Dissanayake

- Tamil Union Cricket and Athletic Club won the toss and elected to bat.
- Tharuka Raveen (Tamil Union Cricket and Athletic Club) made his first-class debut.

15–17 December 2016
Scorecard

| Nondescripts Cricket Club | v | Sinhalese Sports Club |
| 393 (107.3 overs); Chaturanga de Silva 95 (126); Kasun Madushanka 4/82 (23.3 overs) | | 219 (60 overs); Danushka Gunathilaka 112* (151); Chaturanga de Silva 6/72 (22 overs) |
| 232/4d (44 overs); Niroshan Dickwella 79 (104); Danushka Gunathilaka 3/75 (14 overs) | | 172/4 (46.1 overs); Danushka Gunathilaka 54 (78); Anuk Fernando 1/15 (2.1 overs) |

Match drawn
Sinhalese Sports Club Ground, Colombo
Umpires: Rohitha Kottahachchi and Maurice Zilva

- Sinhalese Sports Club won the toss and elected to field.
- Dilan Jayalath (Sinhalese Sports Club) made his first-class debut.

19–21 December 2016
Scorecard

| Tamil Union Cricket and Athletic Club | v | Badureliya Sports Club |
| 252 (63.3 overs); Charith Jayampathi 50 (53); Saliya Saman 4/51 (16 overs) | | 129 (52.5 overs); Nadeera Nawela 60 (115); Ramith Rambukwella 5/47 (18 overs) |
| 239/9d (58.3 overs); Sithara Gimhan 86 (113); Alankara Asanka Silva 7/87 (20.3 overs) | | 324 (84.3 overs); Nimanda Madushanka 126 (158); Jeevan Mendis 4/90 (32 overs) |

Tamil Union Cricket and Athletic Club won by 38 runs
P Sara Oval, Colombo
Umpires: Jayantha de Silva and Raveendra Wimalasiri

- Tamil Union Cricket and Athletic Club won the toss and elected to bat.

21–23 December 2016
Scorecard

| Chilaw Marians Cricket Club | v | Galle Cricket Club |
| 552/8d (113.3 overs); Shehan Jayasuriya 168 (177); Sajeewa Weerakoon 3/161 (32 overs) | | 157 (60.2 overs); Nilushan Nonis 47 (91); Malinda Pushpakumara 5/70 (23 overs) |
| | | 164 (60.3 overs) (f/o); Shalika Karunanayake 64 (139); Malinda Pushpakumara 6/78 (27.3 overs) |

Chilaw Marians Cricket Club won by an innings and 231 runs
FTZ Sports Complex, Katunayake
Umpires: Chaminda Hathurusingha and Rohitha Kottahachchi

- Chilaw Marians Cricket Club won the toss and elected to bat.

21–23 December 2016
Scorecard

| Sinhalese Sports Club | v | Bloomfield Cricket and Athletic Club |
| 490 (113.2 overs); Sachithra Senanayake 120 (107); Malith de Silva 4/151 (40 overs) | | 201 (75.3 overs); Nisal Francisco 58 (93); Jeffrey Vandersay 5/53 (26.3 overs) |
| | | 296/9 (81 overs) (f/o); Lahiru Jayakody 118* (210); Kasun Madushanka 4/49 (15 overs) |

Match drawn
Sinhalese Sports Club Ground, Colombo
Umpires: S. Dissanayake and Kapil Kottahachchi

- Bloomfield Cricket and Athletic Club won the toss and elected to field.
- Mohomad Akram (Bloomfield Cricket and Athletic Club) made his first-class debut.

28–30 December 2016
Scorecard

| Tamil Union Cricket and Athletic Club | v | Bloomfield Cricket and Athletic Club |
| 314 (87.3 overs); Tharanga Paranavitana 60 (139); Shashrika Pussegolla 5/102 (31.3 overs) | | 115 (37.2 overs); Nisal Francisco 45 (70); Ramith Rambukwella 4/38 (13 overs) |
| 120/6d (21 overs); Chamika Karunaratne 38 (17); Malith de Silva 4/26 (4 overs) | | 172/4 (63 overs); Nipun Karunanayake 62 (82); Chamika Karunaratne 1/4 (4 overs) |

Match drawn
Bloomfield Cricket and Athletic Club Ground, Colombo
Umpires: Ravindra Kottahachchi and Ranmore Martinesz

- Tamil Union Cricket and Athletic Club won the toss and elected to bat.
- Lahiru Samarakoon (Tamil Union Cricket and Athletic Club) made his first-class debut.

28–30 December 2016
Scorecard

| Nondescripts Cricket Club | v | Galle Cricket Club |
| 370 (83.5 overs); Angelo Perera 139* (158); Shalika Karunanayake 4/74 (22.5 overs) | | 170 (61.1 overs); Damitha Hunukumbura 66 (131); Chaturanga de Silva 6/67 (25 overs) |
| 330 (75.5 overs); Chaturanga de Silva 86 (94); Roshan Jayatissa 5/153 (31 overs) |

Match drawn
Nondescripts Cricket Club Ground, Colombo
Umpires: Lyndon Hannibal and Raveendra Wimalasiri

- Galle Cricket Club won the toss and elected to field.
- Vishva Chathuranga (Galle Cricket Club) and Roshen Fernando (Nondescripts Cricket Club) both made their first-class debuts.

28–30 December 2016
Scorecard

| Sinhalese Sports Club | v | Badureliya Sports Club |
| 347 (92.5 overs); Shammu Ashan 95 (143); Alankara Asanka Silva 6/126 (35.5 overs) | | 143 (38.5 overs); Shiran Ratnayake 51 (73); Jeffrey Vandersay 6/44 (12 overs) |
| 39/0 (5.2 overs); Ramesh Mendis 20* (17) | | 237 (50.2 overs) (f/o); Saliya Saman 129 (119); Sachithra Senanayake 4/76 (20.2 overs) |

Sinhalese Sports Club won by 10 wickets
Sinhalese Sports Club Ground, Colombo
Umpires: Kitsiri Jayaweera and Pradeep Udawatta

- Sinhalese Sports Club won the toss and elected to bat.
- Shiran Ratnayake, Savith Priyan (Badureliya Sports Club) and Shammu Ashan (Sinhalese Sports Club) all made their first-class debuts.

2–4 January 2017
Scorecard

| Bloomfield Cricket and Athletic Club | v | Galle Cricket Club |
| 273 (100.3 overs); Adeesha Nanayakkara 78 (120); Roshan Jayatissa 4/64 (24.3 overs) | | 185 (54.2 overs); Damitha Hunukumbura 54 (129); Malith de Silva 5/60 (25 overs) |
| 343/7d (69.2 overs); Nipun Karunanayake 183 (165); Chalana de Silva 3/100 (24.2 overs) | | 220/7 (55 overs); Damitha Hunukumbura 56* (108); Malith de Silva 3/37 (17 overs) |

Match drawn
Bloomfield Cricket and Athletic Club Ground, Colombo
Umpires: Ravindra Kottahachchi and Maurice Zilva

- Bloomfield Cricket and Athletic Club won the toss and elected to bat.

6–8 January 2017
Scorecard

| Nondescripts Cricket Club | v | Tamil Union Cricket and Athletic Club |
| 268 (65 overs); Angelo Perera 59 (121); Ramith Rambukwella 3/72 (15 overs) | | 446 (124.5 overs); Jeevan Mendis 151* (260); Anuk Fernando 4/81 (23.5 overs) |
| 349/6 (67 overs); Chaturanga de Silva 84 (74); Jeevan Mendis 3/74 (19 overs) |

Match drawn
P Sara Oval, Colombo
Umpires: Deepal Gunawardene and Ruchira Palliyaguruge

- Nondescripts Cricket Club won the toss and elected to bat.
- Dineth Thimodya (Tamil Union Cricket and Athletic Club) made his first-class debut.

6–8 January 2017
Scorecard

| Galle Cricket Club | v | Badureliya Sports Club |
| 218 (78.2 overs); Nilushan Nonis 62 (123); Alankara Asanka Silva 3/44 (20.2 overs) | | 316 (114.3 overs); Alankara Asanka Silva 85 (222); Sajeewa Weerakoon 5/96 (43) |
| 233 (63.5 overs); Shalika Karunanayake 81 (110); Dilesh Gunaratne 3/42 (17 overs) | | 139/3 (17.5 overs); Saliya Saman 54 (39); Sajeewa Weerakoon 2/61 (8 overs) |

Badureliya Sports Club won by 7 wickets
Surrey Village, Maggona
Umpires: Keerthi Bandara and Gamini Dissanayake

- Badureliya Sports Club won the toss and elected to field.
- Ruwan Herath (Galle Cricket Club) made his first-class debut.

6–8 January 2017
Scorecard

| Chilaw Marians Cricket Club | v | Sinhalese Sports Club |
| 193 (54.1 overs); Ashen Silva 61 (134); Jeffrey Vandersay 5/61 (16 overs) | | 179 (65.3 overs); Ramesh Mendis 53* (164); Malinda Pushpakumara 7/52 (24.3 overs) |
| 309 (71.1 overs); Thikshila de Silva 92 (92); Jeffrey Vandersay 5/94 (22 overs) | | 289 (78.2 overs); Jeffrey Vandersay 69 (112); Maduka Liyanapathiranage 3/76 (19 overs) |

Chilaw Marians Cricket Club won by 34 runs
Sinhalese Sports Club Ground, Colombo
Umpires: Eric Kannangara and Ranmore Martinesz

- Chilaw Marians Cricket Club won the toss and elected to bat.

11–13 January 2017
Scorecard

| Nondescripts Cricket Club | v | Badureliya Sports Club |
| 185 (44.4 overs); Pawan Wickramasinghe 42 (62); Duvindu Tillakaratne 6/78 (16 overs) | | 330 (85.5 overs); Nadeera Nawela 86 (130); Tharindu Kaushal 5/86 (24.5 overs) |
| 239 (55.4 overs); Pawan Wickramasinghe 41 (70); Duvindu Tillakaratne 5/81 (21 overs) | | 96/3 (15.3 overs); Nadeera Nawela 51* (39); Chaturanga de Silva 2/37 (8 overs) |

Badureliya Sports Club won by 7 wickets
Surrey Village, Maggona
Umpires: Lyndon Hannibal and Prageeth Rambukwella

- Badureliya Sports Club won the toss and elected to field
- Ramindu de Silva and Ravindu Tillakaratne (Nondescripts Cricket Club) both made their first-class debuts.

13–15 January 2017
Scorecard

| Galle Cricket Club | v | Sinhalese Sports Club |
| 128 (59.1 overs); Dilhan Cooray 50 (131); Tharindu Ratnayake 4/25 (18.1 overs) | | 379 (92.5 overs); Minod Bhanuka 148 (174); Ruwan Herath 3/44 (14 overs) |
| 312 (70.4 overs); Minhaj Jalill 144 (173); Tharindu Ratnayake 3/104 (25 overs) | | 66/5 (14.1 overs); Kavindu Kulasekara 23* (35); Roshan Jayatissa 3/28 (6 overs) |

Sinhalese Sports Club won by 5 wickets
Galle International Stadium, Galle
Umpires: Hemantha Boteju and Deepal Gunawardene

- Galle Cricket Club won the toss and elected to bat.
- Pawan Dias and Nalin Perera (Galle Cricket Club) both made their first-class debuts.

13–15 January 2017
Scorecard

| Bloomfield Cricket and Athletic Club | v | Chilaw Marians Cricket Club |
| 291 (60.5 overs); Arosh Janoda 80 (55); Lahiru Fernando 6/93 (17.5 overs) | | 136 (53.2 overs); Adeesha Nanayakkara 32 (60); Malinda Pushpakumara 5/78 (26.2 overs) |
| 437/6d (81.1 overs); Shehan Jayasuriya 237 (218); Shashrika Pussegolla 3/139 (24 overs) | | 214 (54.4 overs); Lahiru Jayakody 70 (85); Maduka Liyanapathiranage 5/86 (23.4 overs) |

Chilaw Marians Cricket Club won by 378 runs
Bloomfield Cricket and Athletic Club Ground, Colombo
Umpires: Rohitha Kottahachchi and Pradeep Udawatta

- Chilaw Marians Cricket Club won the toss and elected to bat.

=== Group B ===
29 November–1 December 2016
Scorecard

| Colts Cricket Club | v | Moors Sports Club |
| 367 (101.2 overs); Dilruwan Perera 80 (95); Kosala Kulasekara 5/77 (19 overs) | | 158 (30.2 overs); Tharindu Mendis 35 (69); Prabath Jayasuriya 4/40 (11 overs) |
| | | 132 (32.1 overs) (f/o); Sachithra Perera 52 (55); Dilruwan Perera 4/25 (8.1 overs) |

Colts Cricket Club won by an innings and 77 runs
Colts Cricket Club Ground, Colombo
Umpires: Hemantha Boteju and Lyndon Hannibal

- Moors Sports Club won the toss and elected to field.
- Mohamed Shiraz (Colts Cricket Club) and Umeshka Morais (Moors Sports Club) both made their first-class debuts.

2–4 December 2016
Scorecard

| Colombo Cricket Club | v | Saracens Sports Club |
| 195 (52.2 overs); Sachith Pathirana 59 (56); Kasun Rajitha 6/59 (16.2 overs) | | 173 (52 overs); Irosh Samarasooriya 69 (115); Lahiru Gamage 3/38 (13 overs) |
| 208 (46.3 overs); Wanidu Hasaranga 64 (86); Chathura Randunu 5/66 (17 overs) | | 121 (37.2 overs); Harsha Cooray 31 (53); Ashan Priyanjan 3/22 (5 overs) |

Colombo Cricket Club won by 109 runs
Colombo Cricket Club Ground, Colombo
Umpires: Rohitha Kottahachchi and Prageeth Rambukwella

- Saracens Sports Club won the toss and elected to field.

2–4 December 2016
Scorecard

| Sri Lanka Army Sports Club | v | Burgher Recreation Club |
| 316 (98.1 overs); Asela Gunaratne 158 (221); Vikum Sanjaya 6/73 (21.1 overs) | | 219 (67.4 overs); Rumesh Buddika 92 (156); Viraj Pushpakumara 4/57 (12.4 overs) |
| 202/9d (64.2 overs); Asela Gunaratne 69 (101); Dinuka Hettiarachchi 4/63 (21.2 overs) | | 192/6 (36 overs); Rumesh Buddika 44 (23); Janith Silva 2/14 (6 overs) |

Match drawn
Army Ground, Panagoda
Umpires: Keerthi Bandara and Pradeep Udawatta

- Burgher Recreation Club won the toss and elected to field.
- Isura Lakshan (Burgher Recreation Club); Kasun de Silva and Himasha Liyanage (Sri Lanka Army Sports Club) all made their first-class debuts.

9–11 December 2016
Scorecard

| Colombo Cricket Club | v | Sri Lanka Army Sports Club |
| 218 (56.3 overs); Sachith Pathirana 54 (46); Asela Gunaratne 3/27 (14 overs) | | 216 (82.1 overs); Dushan Vimukthi 78 (183); Lakshan Sandakan 4/71 (22 overs) |
| 309/7d (74 overs); Ron Chandraguptha 116 (163); Viraj Pushpakumara 3/85 (18 overs) | | 227/7 (60 overs); Asela Gunaratne 93* (160); Sachith Pathirana 5/78 (24 overs) |

Match drawn
Colombo Cricket Club Ground, Colombo
Umpires: Lyndon Hannibal and S. H. Sarathkumara

- Colombo Cricket Club won the toss and elected to bat.

9–11 December 2016
Scorecard

| Saracens Sports Club | v | Burgher Recreation Club |
| 302 (79.5 overs); Umesh Karunaratne 84 (138); Dinuka Hettiarachchi 5/96 (24.5 overs) | | 197 (74.3 overs); Deshan Dias 32 (97); Kasun Rajitha 5/72 (22.3 overs) |
| 212 (62.4 overs); Irosh Samarasooriya 110 (176); Hashen Ramanayake 3/35 (10.4 overs) | | 183/3 (32 overs); Tillakaratne Sampath 100* (97); Suraj Randiv 2/57 (11 overs) |

Match drawn
Burgher Recreation Club Ground, Colombo
Umpires: Nilan De Silva and Saman Jayamahamudali

- Saracens Sports Club won the toss and elected to bat.
- Neranjana Wanniarachchi (Burgher Recreation Club) made his first-class debut.

9–11 December 2016
Scorecard

| Moors Sports Club | v | Ragama Cricket Club |
| 217 (55.2 overs); Primosh Perera 64 (93); Amila Aponso 4/40 (15.2 overs) | | 361 (86.2 overs); Udara Jayasundera 112 (145); Sachithra Perera 5/119 (26 overs) |
| 181 (57.3 overs); Ruvindu Gunasekera 57 (79); Sahan Nanayakkare 6/55 (18.3 overs) | | 40/0 (5.5 overs); Lahiru Milantha 31* (17) |

Ragama Cricket Club won by 10 wickets
Moors Sports Club Ground, Colombo
Umpires: Kapil Kottahachchi and Raveendra Wimalasiri

- Moors Sports Club won the toss and elected to bat.

14–16 December 2016
Scorecard

| Saracens Sports Club | v | Ragama Cricket Club |
| 401 (98.3 overs); Sangeeth Cooray 189 (248); Amila Aponso 4/100 (25 overs) | | 448 (151 overs); Udara Jayasundera 109 (180); Suraj Randiv 4/119 (50 overs) |
| 5/0 (2 overs); Irosh Samarasooriya 5* (9) |

Match drawn
Surrey Village, Maggona
Umpires: Dilshan de Silva and Chaminda Hathurusingha

- Saracens Sports Club won the toss and elected to bat.

15–17 December 2016
Scorecard

| Moors Sports Club | v | Sri Lanka Army Sports Club |
| 376 (97.5 overs); Shanuka Dulaj 181* (222); Asela Gunaratne 3/50 (17 overs) | | 242 (79 overs); Manjula de Zoysa 90 (159); Nilanka Sandakan 5/69 (29 overs) |
| 219/8d (51.4 overs); Primosh Perera 65 (113); Viraj Pushpakumara 3/48 (9 overs) | | 169/3 (29 overs); Dushan Vimukthi 54* (53); Nilanka Sandakan 2/40 (8 overs) |

Match drawn
Burgher Recreation Club Ground, Colombo
Umpires: Rohitha Kottahachchi and Pradeep Udawatta

- Moors Sports Club won the toss and elected to bat.
- Nilanka Sandakan (Moors Sports Club) made his first-class debut.

15–17 December 2016
Scorecard

| Colts Cricket Club | v | Colombo Cricket Club |
| 276 (81.4 overs); Hashan Dumindu 105 (194); Sachith Pathirana 3/37 (16 overs) | | 384 (79.4 overs); Wanidu Hasaranga 116* (118); Akila Dananjaya 4/119 (26 overs) |
| 316/6 (85 overs); Hashan Dumindu 69 (148); Sachith Pathirana 4/86 (27 overs) |

Match drawn
Colts Cricket Club Ground, Colombo
Umpires: Keerthi Bandara and Eric Kannangara

- Colombo Cricket Club won the toss and elected to field.

21–23 December 2016
Scorecard

| Burgher Recreation Club | v | Moors Sports Club |
| 293 (76.4 overs); Lasith Lakshan 63 (118); Thilan Thushara 3/54 (15 overs) | | 226 (61.3 overs); Ruvindu Gunasekera 50 (68); Tillakaratne Sampath 4/57 (18.3 overs) |
| 280 (64.2 overs); Tillakaratne Sampath 92 (143); Ruvindu Gunasekera 4/34 (7.2 overs) | | 325/8 (55 overs); Primosh Perera 104 (144); Hashen Ramanayake 5/88 (14 overs) |

Match drawn
Moors Sports Club Ground, Colombo
Umpires: Dilshan de Silva and Eric Kannangara

- Burgher Recreation Club won the toss and elected to bat.

21–23 December 2016
Scorecard

| Sri Lanka Army Sports Club | v | Ragama Cricket Club |
| 276 (97.1 overs); Leo Fransisco 103 (237); Amila Aponso 7/71 (32 overs) | | 304 (78.5 overs); Roshen Silva 109 (169); Nalin Priyadarshana 5/52 (16.5 overs) |
| 234 (82.4 overs); Lakshitha Madushan 73 (143); Amila Aponso 4/65 (27.4 overs) | | 40/2 (9 overs); Lahiru Milantha 20* (21); Dushan Vimukthi 2/9 (4 overs) |

Match drawn
Army Ground, Panagoda
Umpires: Gamini Dissanayake and Maurice Zilva

- Dilshan de Soysa (Sri Lanka Army Sports Club) made his first-class debut.

21–23 December 2016
Scorecard

| Colts Cricket Club | v | Saracens Sports Club |
| 374 (106.1 overs); Angelo Jayasinghe 109 (212); Chathura Randunu 6/94 (37 overs) | | 351 (103.2 overs); Sangeeth Cooray 57 (88); Prabath Jayasuriya 4/67 (22 overs) |
| 170/5 (53 overs); Hashan Dumindu 65* (138); Chathura Randunu 3/62 (21 overs) |

Match drawn
Colts Cricket Club Ground, Colombo
Umpires: Krishantha Rodrigo

- Saracens Sports Club won the toss and elected to field.
- Keshan Wijerathne (Colts Cricket Club) made his first-class debut.

28–30 December 2016
Scorecard

| Saracens Sports Club | v | Moors Sports Club |
| 292 (80 overs); Irosh Samarasooriya 85 (143); Sachithra Perera 3/59 (18 overs) | | 256 (78.5 overs); Thilan Thushara 60 (69); Chathura Randunu 3/45 (17 overs) |
| 296 (69.2 overs); Irosh Samarasooriya 60 (109); Sachithra Perera 7/92 (19.2 overs) |

Match drawn
Moors Sports Club Ground, Colombo
Umpires: Saman Mohan de Silva and Gamini Dissanayake

- Saracens Sports Club won the toss and elected to bat.
- Promod Maduwantha (Moors Sports Club) made his first-class debut.

28–30 December 2016
Scorecard

| Ragama Cricket Club | v | Colombo Cricket Club |
| 406/9d (135.2 overs); Sameera de Zoysa 94 (156); Lahiru Gamage 5/103 (36.2 overs) | | 232/4 (36 overs); Dilshan Munaweera 93 (91); Amila Aponso 3/47 (13 overs) |

Match drawn
Surrey Village, Maggona
Umpires: Hemantha Boteju and Dilshan de Silva

- Colombo Cricket Club won the toss and elected to field.
- Udith Madushan (Ragama Cricket Club) made his first-class debut.

28–30 December 2016
Scorecard

| Colts Cricket Club | v | Burgher Recreation Club |
| 360 (116.3 overs); Sadeera Samarawickrama 119 (180); Dinuka Hettiarachchi 6/115 (41 overs) | | 249 (83.3 overs); Hashen Ramanayake 61 (116); Prabath Jayasuriya 6/74 (38.3 overs) |
| 150/3 (45 overs); Sadeera Samarawickrama 60* (132); Lasith Lakshan 1/1 (1 over) |

Match drawn
Burgher Recreation Club Ground, Colombo
Umpires: Keerthi Bandara and Kapil Kottahachchi

- Burgher Recreation Club won the toss and elected to field.

6–8 January 2017
Scorecard

| Sri Lanka Army Sports Club | v | Colts Cricket Club |
| 297 (72.4 overs); Seekkuge Prasanna 58 (51); Charith Sudaraka 5/98 (21 overs) | | 112 (35.3 overs); Vishad Randika 36 (74); Nuwan Liyanapathirana 3/34 (12 overs) |
| 288/5d (73.2 overs); Leo Fransisco 116* (206); Charith Sudaraka 2/61 (12.2 overs) | | 445/9 (80 overs); Sadeera Samarawickrama 130 (98); Nuwan Liyanapathirana 3/115 (20 overs) |

Match drawn
Colts Cricket Club Ground, Colombo
Umpires: Kapil Kottahachchi and S. H. Sarathkumara

- Colts Cricket Club won the toss and elected to field.
- Vishad Randika, Salinda Ushan and Charith Sudaraka (Colts Cricket Club) all made their first-class debuts.

6–8 January 2017
Scorecard

| Colombo Cricket Club | v | Moors Sports Club |
| 560 (116.4 overs); Lasith Abeyratne 156* (204); Thilan Thushara 3/82 (19 overs) | | 275 (64.4 overs); Nilanka Sandakan 70* (104); Dilshan Munaweera 3/26 (8 overs) |
| 137 (26.4 overs); Ron Chandraguptha 43 (52); Nilanka Sandakan 6/72 (11.4 overs) | | 141/6 (41 overs); Ruvindu Gunasekera 53 (101); Lakshan Sandakan 2/33 (10 overs) |

Match drawn
Moors Sports Club Ground, Colombo
Umpires: Asanga Jayasooriya and Raveendra Wimalasiri

- Colombo Cricket Club won the toss and elected to bat.

6–8 January 2017
Scorecard

| Burgher Recreation Club | v | Ragama Cricket Club |
| 194 (60.1 overs); Lasith Lakshan 46 (74); Amila Aponso 5/34 (15.1 overs) | | 254 (84.3 overs); Roshen Silva 91 (159); Tillakaratne Sampath 5/98 (32.3 overs) |
| 152 (51 overs); Harsha Vithana 47* (79); Sahan Nanayakkare 3/35 (13 overs) | | 93/2 (19.3 overs); Udara Jayasundera 56* (43); Dinuka Hettiarachchi 2/31 (6 overs) |

Ragama Cricket Club won by 8 wickets
Burgher Recreation Club Ground, Colombo
Umpires: W. C. C. Rodrigo and Ranganath Prasanna

- Burgher Recreation Club won the toss and elected to bat.
- Shashin Dilranga (Burgher Recreation Club) made his first-class debut.

13–15 January 2017
Scorecard

| Colts Cricket Club | v | Ragama Cricket Club |
| 366 (113.4 overs); Sadeera Samarawickrama 96 (120); Amila Aponso 7/85 (38.4 overs) | | 366 (115.4 overs); Udara Jayasundera 144 (275); Nisala Tharaka 5/70 (22 overs) |
| 170/2 (34.3 overs); Sadeera Samarawickrama 112* (103); Chathura Peiris 2/54 (9.3 overs) |

Match drawn
Nondescripts Cricket Club Ground, Colombo
Umpires: Nilan De Silva and Kapil Kottahachchi

- Colts Cricket Club won the toss and elected to bat.

13–15 January 2017
Scorecard

| Colombo Cricket Club | v | Burgher Recreation Club |
| 326 (72.1 overs); Dilshan Munaweera 191 (179); Dinuka Hettiarachchi 6/137 (28 overs) | | 465 (118.4 overs); Tillakaratne Sampath 123 (167); Shaluka Silva 3/86 (26 overs) |
| 222/7 (61 overs); Ron Chandraguptha 102* (144); Hashen Ramanayake 2/22 (4 overs) |

Match drawn
Colombo Cricket Club Ground, Colombo
Umpires: Keerthi Bandara and Raveendra Wimalasiri

- Colombo Cricket Club won the toss and elected to bat.

13–15 January 2017
Scorecard

| Saracens Sports Club | v | Sri Lanka Army Sports Club |
| 358 (87.2 overs); Milinda Siriwardana 121 (198); Viraj Pushpakumara 3/72 (18.2 overs) | | 361 (116.2 overs); Lakshitha Madushan 152 (302); Suraj Randiv 6/85 (37.2 overs) |
| 179/5d (23 overs); Sangeeth Cooray 78* (65); Dushan Vimukthi 3/72 (8 overs) | | 146/5 (44 overs); Dushan Vimukthi 55 (84); Suraj Randiv 3/60 (20 overs) |

Match drawn
Moors Sports Club Ground, Colombo
Umpires: Asanga Jayasooriya and S. H. Sarathkumara

- Saracens Sports Club won the toss and elected to bat.

=== Plate League ===
20–22 January 2017
Scorecard

| Badureliya Sports Club | v | Moors Sports Club |
| 300 (88.1 overs); Sahan Wijeratne 102 (203); Nilanka Sandakan 5/52 (23.1 overs) | | 214 (68.5 overs); Pabasara Waduge 71 (152); Dilesh Gunaratne 4/54 (16 overs) |
| 259/8d (81.1 overs); Sahan Wijeratne 100* (224); Promod Maduwantha 4/53 (23.1 overs) | | 76/4 (71 overs); Rajitha Wickramarachchi 29 (32); Duvindu Tillakaratne 4/40 (8 overs) |

Match drawn
Burgher Recreation Club Ground, Colombo
Umpires: Keerthi Bandara and Dilshan de Silva

- Moors Sports Club won the toss and elected to field.
- Ruwan Chathuranga (Moors Sports Club) made his first-class debut.

20–22 January 2017
Scorecard

| Bloomfield Cricket and Athletic Club | v | Burgher Recreation Club |
| 317 (99.2 overs); Nipun Karunanayake 98 (187); Dinuka Hettiarachchi 6/103 (35.2 overs) | | 391/9 (117 overs); Chanaka Wijesinghe 130* (246); Malith de Silva 5/91 (44 overs) |

Match drawn
Army Ground, Panagoda
Umpires: Eric Kannangara and Ranganath Prasanna

- Bloomfield Cricket and Athletic Club won the toss and elected to bat.

20–22 January 2017
Scorecard

| Galle Cricket Club | v | Saracens Sports Club |
| 301 (86.3 overs); Damitha Hunukumbura 97 (160); Kasun Rajitha 5/57 (19.3 overs) | | 315 (82.4 overs); Milinda Siriwardana 115 (145); Sajeewa Weerakoon 4/121 (29 overs) |
| 259/5d (54 overs); Nilushan Nonis 108* (147); Chathura Randunu 2/64 (15 overs) | | 84/2 (15 overs); Denuwan Rajakaruna 40 (26); Roshan Jayatissa 1/7 (3.1 overs) |

Match drawn
Bloomfield Cricket and Athletic Club Ground, Colombo
Umpires: Nilantha Semasinghe and Ranjith Vishwakula

- Galle Cricket Club won the toss and elected to bat.

27–29 January 2017
Scorecard

| Badureliya Sports Club | v | Saracens Sports Club |
| 302 (91.4 overs); Pathum Madusanka 110* (276); Kasun Rajitha 3/78 (25.4 overs) | | 321/6 (87 overs); Gamindu Kanishka 130 (213); Dilesh Gunaratne 3/48 (21 overs) |

Match drawn
Burgher Recreation Club Ground, Colombo
Umpires: Saman Mohan de Silva and Vidura Prasad

- Saracens Sports Club won the toss and elected to field.
- No play was possible on day 1 due to rain.

27–29 January 2017
Scorecard

| Bloomfield Cricket and Athletic Club | v | Moors Sports Club |
| 152 (49.3 overs); Thiran Dhanapala 30 (50); Promod Maduwantha 3/5 (3 overs) | | 371 (89.4 overs); Pabasara Waduge 72 (104); Malith de Silva 6/148 (34.4 overs) |
| 201/4 (47 overs); Lahiru Jayakody 60 (65); Promod Maduwantha 2/63 (13 overs) |

Match drawn
Surrey Village, Maggona
Umpires: Nilan De Silva and Krishantha Rodrigo

- Bloomfield Cricket and Athletic Club won the toss and elected to bat.
- Ubethilke Anuruddha (Bloomfield Cricket and Athletic Club) made his first-class debut.

27–29 January 2017
Scorecard

| Galle Cricket Club | v | Burgher Recreation Club |
| 407 (126.5 overs); Yashodha Lanka 167 (221); Dinuka Hettiarachchi 7/158 (55.5 overs) | | 447/6 (123 overs); Rumesh Buddika 116 (137); Chathupama Gunasinghe 2/88 (18 overs) |

Match drawn
Bloomfield Cricket and Athletic Club Ground, Colombo
Umpires: Chaminda Hathurusingha and Eric Kannangara

- Galle Cricket Club won the toss and elected to bat.

5–7 February 2017
Scorecard

| Burgher Recreation Club | v | Badureliya Sports Club |
| 358 (93.3 overs); Rumesh Buddika 133 (157); Dilesh Gunaratne 4/78 (25.3 overs) | | 346 (121 overs); Pathum Madusanka 78* (208); Tillakaratne Sampath 5/81 (33 overs) |
| 278/7 (55 overs); Tillakaratne Sampath 68 (62); Duvindu Tillakaratne 4/111 (17 overs) |

Match drawn
Army Ground, Panagoda
Umpires: Palitha de Alwis and Suranga Perera

- Burgher Recreation Club won the toss and elected to bat.

5–7 February 2017
Scorecard

| Bloomfield Cricket and Athletic Club | v | Saracens Sports Club |
| 207 (56 overs); Sacha De Alwis 35 (53); Suraj Randiv 5/65 (18 overs) | | 351 (86.2 overs); Harsha Cooray 95 (168); Malith de Silva 6/120 (38 overs) |
| 380 (107.1 overs); Adeesha Nanayakkara 78 (113); Kasun Rajitha 5/152 (31.1 overs) | | 49/4 (10 overs); Kaushalya Gajasinghe 18* (16); Malith de Silva 3/29 (4 overs) |

Match drawn
Colts Cricket Club Ground, Colombo
Umpires: Asanga Jayasooriya and Maurice Zilva

- Saracens Sports Club won the toss and elected to field.

5–7 February 2017
Scorecard

| Moors Sports Club | v | Galle Cricket Club |
| 175 (68.2 overs); Pabasara Waduge 83 (199); Roshan Jayatissa 3/40 (18 overs) | | 310/9d (91 overs); Minhaj Jalill 77 (161); Sahan Adeesha 3/28 (11 overs) |
| 238/5 (99 overs); Ruvindu Gunasekera 55 (125); Chathupama Gunasinghe 1/33 (13 overs) |

Match drawn
Burgher Recreation Club Ground, Colombo
Umpires: Dilshan de Silva and Susantha Dissanayake

- Moors Sports Club won the toss and elected to bat.

=== Super Eight ===
20–23 January 2017
Scorecard

| Chilaw Marians Cricket Club | v | Sri Lanka Army Sports Club |
| 190 (61.2 overs); Mahela Udawatte 52 (65); Danusika Bandara 5/36 (12 overs) | | 183 (74.2 overs); Dilshan de Soysa 47 (121); Sachithra Serasinghe 4/29 (13 overs) |
| 148 (36.4 overs); Shehan Jayasuriya 38 (36); Nalin Priyadarshana 5/68 (13 overs) | | 140 (61 overs); Janith Silva 37 (70); Malinda Pushpakumara 5/59 (24 overs) |

Chilaw Marians Cricket Club won by 15 runs
P Sara Oval, Colombo
Umpires: Ravindra Kottahachchi and Raveendra Wimalasiri

- Chilaw Marians Cricket Club won the toss and elected to bat.
- Raveen Yasas (Chilaw Marians Cricket Club) made his first-class debut.

20–23 January 2017
Scorecard

| Nondescripts Cricket Club | v | Ragama Cricket Club |
| 265 (62 overs); Chaturanga de Silva 83 (85); Chathura Peiris 4/60 (13 overs) | | 127 (47.3 overs); Sameera de Zoysa 57 (83); Chaturanga de Silva 4/21 (10.3 overs) |
| 213 (53.5 overs); Chaturanga de Silva 78 (109); Tilaksha Sumanasiri 3/28 (10 overs) | | 352/9 (136.3 overs); Janith Liyanage 87 (267); Chaturanga de Silva 3/84 (39 overs) |

Ragama Cricket Club won by 1 wicket
Colombo Cricket Club Ground, Colombo
Umpires: Lyndon Hannibal and Maurice Zilva

- Ragama Cricket Club won the toss and elected to field.

20–23 January 2017
Scorecard

| Sinhalese Sports Club | v | Colts Cricket Club |
| 293 (85 overs); Dimuth Karunaratne 125 (220); Dilruwan Perera 4/75 (27 overs) | | 100 (31 overs); Sadeera Samarawickrama 22 (18); Sachithra Senanayake 4/31 (12 overs) |
| 193 (57.3 overs); Kavindu Kulasekara 54 (102); Dilruwan Perera 4/56 (18 overs) | | 177 (27.5 overs); Ishan Jayaratne 85 (40); Sachithra Senanayake 4/53 (10 overs) |

Sinhalese Sports Club won by 209 runs
FTZ Sports Complex, Katunayake
Umpires: Nilan De Silva and Ranmore Martinesz

- Sinhalese Sports Club won the toss and elected to bat.

20–23 January 2017
Scorecard

| Tamil Union Cricket and Athletic Club | v | Colombo Cricket Club |
| 377 (87.3 overs); Kithuruwan Vithanage 130 (161); Lahiru Madushanka 4/77 (16.3 overs) | | 497 (112.1 overs); Lahiru Madushanka 164 (209); Chamika Karunaratne 4/128 (30 overs) |
| 149 (46.1 overs); Ramith Rambukwella 33 (47); Lahiru Gamage 5/51 (18 overs) | | 30/0 (2.3 overs); Wanidu Hasaranga 22* (10) |

Colombo Cricket Club won by 10 wickets
Colts Cricket Club Ground, Colombo
Umpires: Deepal Gunawardene and Pradeep Udawatta

- Colombo Cricket Club won the toss and elected to field.
- Raveen Sayer (Colombo Cricket Club) made his first-class debut.

28–31 January 2017
Scorecard

| Colts Cricket Club | v | Chilaw Marians Cricket Club |
| 150 (46.5 overs); Sadeera Samarawickrama 29 (31); Arosh Janoda 7/38 (12.5 overs) | | 196 (49.5 overs); Thikshila de Silva 44 (69); Akila Dananjaya 3/11 (9 overs) |
| 39 (13.4 overs); Sadeera Samarawickrama 16 (15); Malinda Pushpakumara 4/3 (3.4 overs) |

Chilaw Marians Cricket Club won by an innings and 7 runs
Colombo Cricket Club Ground, Colombo
Umpires: Hemantha Boteju and Prageeth Rambukwella

- Chilaw Marians Cricket Club won the toss and elected to field.

28–31 January 2017
Scorecard

| Sri Lanka Army Sports Club | v | Sinhalese Sports Club |
| 228 (67.3 overs); Dilshan de Soysa 74 (166); Sachithra Senanayake 4/43 (18.3 overs) | | 323 (81.5 overs); Dasun Shanaka 92 (92); Seekkuge Prasanna 3/84 (22 overs) |
| 106 (37.3 overs); Seekkuge Prasanna 38 (44); Vimukthi Perera 4/16 (11.3 overs) | | 12/0 (1 over); Kaushal Silva 12* (6) |

Sinhalese Sports Club won by 10 wickets
Colts Cricket Club Ground, Colombo
Umpires: Ravindra Kottahachchi and Ranmore Martinesz

- Sinhalese Sports Club won the toss and elected to field.
- MNS Fernando and KYN Mendis (Sri Lanka Army Sports Club) both made their first-class debuts.

28–31 January 2017
Scorecard

| Tamil Union Cricket and Athletic Club | v | Ragama Cricket Club |
| 318 (101.5 overs); Dineth Thimodya 113 (216); Amila Aponso 3/43 (16.5 overs) | | 506/7d (183 overs); Lahiru Milantha 144 (314); Chamika Karunaratne 4/120 (46 overs) |
| 146/6 (40 overs); Dineth Thimodya 51 (78); Akshu Fernando 3/82 (17 overs) |

Match drawn
R Premadasa Stadium, Colombo
Umpires: Gamini Dissanayake and Deepal Gunawardene

- Ragama Cricket Club won the toss and elected to field.

28–31 January 2017
Scorecard

| Nondescripts Cricket Club | v | Colombo Cricket Club |
| 200 (49 overs); Anuk Fernando 43 (36); Lahiru Gamage 4/52 (15 overs) | | 293 (78.2 overs); Ron Chandraguptha 108 (213); Tharindu Kaushal 4/71 (12.2 overs) |
| 332 (85.3 overs); Angelo Perera 108 (186); Usman Ishak 3/47 (9.3 overs) | | 240/7 (81.2 overs); Madawa Warnapura 54 (147); Lasith Ambuldeniya 5/85 (31 overs) |

Colombo Cricket Club won by 3 wickets
P Sara Oval, Colombo
Umpires: Pradeep Udawatta and Raveendra Wimalasiri

- Colombo Cricket Club won the toss and elected to field.
- Usman Ishak, Malindu Maduranga (Colombo Cricket Club), Lasith Ambuldeniya and Hashan Upendra (Nondescripts Cricket Club) all made their first-class debuts.

5–8 February 2017
Scorecard

| Ragama Cricket Club | v | Sinhalese Sports Club |
| 220 (68.3 overs); Akshu Fernando 94 (161); Vimukthi Perera 5/33 (15 overs) | | 389 (122.5 overs); Kaushal Silva 74 (112); Chathura Peiris 2/84 (20.1 overs) |
| 201 (56.1 overs); Lahiru Milantha 63 (116); Sachithra Senanayake 3/46 (24 overs) | | 35/2 (4.4 overs); Dimuth Karunaratne 17 (11); Amila Aponso 2/14 (2.4 overs) |

Sinhalese Sports Club won by 8 wickets
R Premadasa Stadium, Colombo
Umpires: Seekkuge Sarathkumara and Ranganath Prasanna

- Ragama Cricket Club won the toss and elected to bat.

5–8 February 2017
Scorecard

| Tamil Union Cricket and Athletic Club | v | Sri Lanka Army Sports Club |
| 174 (43 overs); Chamika Karunaratne 61 (49); Yasoda Mendis 4/55 (12 overs) | | 383 (107.1 overs); Leo Fransisco 77 (163); Jeevan Mendis 5/97 (32.1 overs) |
| 179 (52.2 overs); Manoj Sarathchandra 52 (104); Nalin Priyadarshana 3/34 (13 overs) |

Sri Lanka Army Sports Club won by an innings and 30 runs
Sinhalese Sports Club Ground, Colombo
Umpires: Chaminda Hathurusingha and Prageeth Rambukwella

- Navod Ilukwatta (Sri Lanka Army Sports Club) made his first-class debut.

5–8 February 2017
Scorecard

| Colts Cricket Club | v | Nondescripts Cricket Club |
| 192 (54 overs); Priyamal Perera 43 (75); Lasith Ambuldeniya 6/63 (24 overs) | | 307 (80.3 overs); Angelo Perera 71 (108); Dilruwan Perera 6/82 (29 overs) |
| 222 (69.5 overs); Sadeera Samarawickrama 64 (105); Jehan Mubarak 4/29 (12.5 overs) | | 111/4 (23.1 overs); Lahiru Udara 45 (36); Akila Dananjaya 2/37 (7.1 overs) |

Nondescripts Cricket Club won by 6 wickets
P Sara Oval, Colombo
Umpires: Keerthi Bandara and Kapil Kottahachchi

- Colts Cricket Club won the toss and elected to bat.
- Yasas Alwis (Nondescripts Cricket Club) made his first-class debut.

5–8 February 2017
Scorecard

| Chilaw Marians Cricket Club | v | Colombo Cricket Club |
| 213 (55 overs); Maduka Liyanapathiranage 40 (77); Lahiru Gamage 4/65 (18 overs) | | 190 (53.5 overs); Madawa Warnapura 71 (144); Arosh Janoda 3/19 (8 overs) |
| 461/9d (124.2 overs); Sachithra Serasinghe 207 (293); Ashan Priyanjan 3/57 (16.2 overs) | | 118 (27.1 overs); Raveen Sayer 26 (31); Malinda Pushpakumara 7/58 (13.1 overs) |

Chilaw Marians Cricket Club won by 366 runs
Surrey Village, Maggona
Umpires: Gamini Dissanayake

- Colombo Cricket Club won the toss and elected to field.

14–17 February 2017
Scorecard

| Chilaw Marians Cricket Club | v | Ragama Cricket Club |
| 168 (41.4 overs); Mahela Udawatte 41 (36); Nilanka Premaratne 5/41 (11 overs) | | 276 (85 overs); Saminda Fernando 93 (165); Arosh Janoda 5/45 (22 overs) |
| 295 (96.5 overs); Sachithra Serasinghe 56 (108); Sahan Nanayakkare 7/92 (29.5 overs) | | 191/3 (52.5 overs); Lahiru Milantha 62 (147); Maduka Liyanapathiranage 2/61 (22 overs) |

Ragama Cricket Club won by 7 wickets
Colts Cricket Club Ground, Colombo
Umpires: Saman Mohan de Silva and Ruchira Palliyaguruge

- Ragama Cricket Club won the toss and elected to field.
- Saminda Fernando (Ragama Cricket Club) made his first-class debut.

14–17 February 2017
Scorecard

| Sinhalese Sports Club | v | Colombo Cricket Club |
| 147 (47 overs); Kaushal Silva 47 (86); Wanidu Hasaranga 5/15 (8 overs) | | 101 (25.2 overs); Roshan Anurudda 27 (58); Sachithra Senanayake 4/15 (7.2 overs) |
| 155 (40.4 overs); Kaushal Silva 43 (69); Ashan Priyanjan 4/14 (4.4 overs) | | 117 (33.4 overs); Lahiru Madushanka 35* (54); Sachithra Senanayake 4/30 (14 overs) |

Sinhalese Sports Club won by 84 runs
R Premadasa Stadium, Colombo
Umpires: Keerthi Bandara and Ranmore Martinesz

- Sinhalese Sports Club won the toss and elected to bat.
- Dilshan Abeysinghe and Krishan Sanjula (Sinhalese Sports Club) both made their first-class debuts.

14–17 February 2017
Scorecard

| Colts Cricket Club | v | Tamil Union Cricket and Athletic Club |
| 218 (52.2 overs); Sadeera Samarawickrama 52 (56); Dulanjana Mendis 5/71 (18.2 overs) | | 168 (45.2 overs); Sithara Gimhan 43 (102); Ishan Jayaratne 5/40 (14 overs) |
| 411 (117.3 overs); Sadeera Samarawickrama 93 (99); Pramod Madushan 5/112 (26 overs) | | 279 (62 overs); Sithara Gimhan 85 (130); Akila Dananjaya 5/103 (21 overs) |

Colts Cricket Club won by 182 runs
Surrey Village, Maggona
Umpires: Gamini Dissanayake and Ranjith Vishwakula

- Colts Cricket Club won the toss and elected to bat.

14–17 February 2017
Scorecard

| Nondescripts Cricket Club | v | Sri Lanka Army Sports Club |
| 268 (68.2 overs); Thimira Jayasinghe 53 (72); Yasoda Mendis 4/65 (16 overs) | | 227 (70.3 overs); Lakshitha Madushan 54 (93); Sachintha Peiris 4/43 (20.3 overs) |
| 266 (65.4 overs); Angelo Perera 106 (134); Danusika Bandara 3/44 (9.4 overs) | | 131 (34 overs); Lakshitha Madushan 39 (55); Lasith Ambuldeniya 4/42 (10 overs) |

Nondescripts Cricket Club won by 176 runs
FTZ Sports Complex, Katunayake
Umpires: Krishantha Rodrigo and Upul Wewage

- Sri Lanka Army Sports Club won the toss and elected to field.
- Ashan Randika (Sri Lanka Army Sports Club) made his first-class debut.

== See also ==
- 2016–17 Premier League Tournament Tier B
