= List of Burgher Recreation Club cricketers =

List of first-class cricketers by club

This is an incomplete list in alphabetical order of cricketers who have played for Burgher Recreation Club in top-class (Note: Top-class matches are first-class, List A, and Twenty20.) matches since the club initially achieved first-class status in 1989.

== Key ==
- † preceding a player's name means that the original article is now a redirect to this list.

== A ==
- Ishara Amerasinghe

== D ==
- Lanka de Silva
- Deshan Dias
- † Chameera Dissanayake
- Shanuka Dulaj

== F ==
- Nisal Francisco

== H ==
- B. R. Heyn

== I ==
- † Akeel Inham

== J ==
- Chinthaka Jayasinghe

== K ==
- Tharindu Kaushal
- Kevin Koththigoda

== L ==
- Lasith Lakshan
- Lisula Lakshan

== N ==
- Shehan Nissanka

== P ==
- Jayantha Paranathala
- Nuwan Pradeep

== R ==
- Bhanuka Rajapaksa
- Hashen Ramanayake
- Anura Ranasinghe

== S ==
- Malindu Shehan
- Mohamed Shiraz
- Mohammed Shiraz
- Sohaibullah
- Andy Solomons

== T ==
- Duvindu Tillakaratne

== W ==
- Sajeewa Weerakoon
- Raminda Wijesooriya
