= Tillakaratne =

Tillakaratne is a given name and surname. Notable people with the name include:

== Given name ==
- Tillakaratne Dilshan (born 1976), Sri Lankan cricketer
- Tillakaratne Sampath (born 1982), Sri Lankan cricketer

== Surname ==
- Duvindu Tillakaratne (born 1996), Sri Lankan cricketer
- Hashan Tillakaratne (born 1967), Sri Lankan cricketer
- Heshan Tillakaratne (born 1976), Sri Lankan cricketer
- Nilantha Tillakaratne (born 1977), Sri Lankan cricketer
- Ravindu Tillakaratne (born 1996), Sri Lankan cricketer
- Samith Tillakaratne (born 1978), Sri Lankan cricketer
