= Lahiru =

Lahiru is a masculine given name of Sinhalese origin. Notable people with the given name include:

- Lahiru Fernando (born 1994), Sri Lankan cricketer
- Lahiru Gamage (born 1988), Sri Lankan cricketer
- Lahiru Jayakody (born 1994), Sri Lankan cricketer
- Lahiru Jayaratne (born 1991), Sri Lankan cricketer
- Lahiru Kumara (born 1997), Sri Lankan cricketer
- Lahiru Madushanka (born 1992), Sri Lankan cricketer
- Lahiru Milantha (born 1994), Sri Lankan cricketer
- Lahiru Perera (born 1984), Sri Lankan singer, musician and music producer
- Lahiru Samarakoon (born 1997), Sri Lankan cricketer
- Lahiru Sandaruwan (born 1991), Sri Lankan cricketer
- Lahiru Sri Lakmal (born 1989), Sri Lankan cricketer
- Lahiru Thirimanne (born 1989), Sri Lankan cricketer
- Lahiru Udara (born 1993), Sri Lankan cricketer
- Lahiru Weragala (born 1989), Sri Lankan cricketer
