= Burgher Recreation Club =

Cricket and hockey club based in Colombo, Sri Lanka

- One Day name: Burgher Recreation Club

Personnel
- Captain: Hashen Ramanayake
- Coach: Reza Tahir

Team information
- Colours: Maroon
- Founded: 1896
- Home ground: Havelock Park

History
- Premier Trophy wins: 1
- Premier Limited Overs Tournament wins: nil
- Inter-Provincial Twenty20 wins: nil
- Official website: www.brcclub.net

Burgher Recreation Club is a first-class cricket and hockey club based in Colombo, Sri Lanka.

== History ==
The club was founded on 26 December 1896 as the Bambalapitya Recreation Club, with membership restricted to the Burgher community. The first president was A. W. Raffel, the honorary secretary O. H. Poppenback and the club captain V. O. Wright. The club won its first cricket match on 9 November 1901.

In 1902 the club moved from Bambalapitiya to Havelock Park. On 31 May 1915 the club changed its name to the Burgher Recreation Club. In 1925 the club was adjudged cricket champions. In 1947 B. R. Heyn was appointed the captain of the Sri Lanka national cricket team. In the 1950s the club opened its membership to the wider community. The club won its first P. Saravanamuttu Trophy in the 1955–56 season.

The club competed at first-class level in the Premier Trophy from 1988 to 1989 to 2012–13, but lost its first-class status when the number of teams in the competition was reduced from 20 to 14 after the 2012–13 season. It is eligible for promotion back to first-class status, depending on its results in non-first-class competitions.

== Honours ==
- 1955–56 – P Saravanamuttu Trophy

== Current squad ==
These players featured in matches for Burgher Recreation Club in 2019/20.

The names of players with international caps are listed in bold

No	Name	Nat	Age	Batting style	Bowling style
Batsmen
7	Raminda Wijesooriya	(Sri Lanka)	27	Left-handed	–
9	Lasith Lakshan	(Sri Lanka)	29	Right-handed	Right-arm off-break
54	**Bhanuka Rajapaksa**	(Sri Lanka)	34	Left-handed	Right-arm medium-fast
–	Nisal Francisco	(Sri Lanka)	28	Left-handed	Right-arm leg-break
–	Shanuka Dulaj	(Sri Lanka)	30	Left-handed	Right-arm leg-break
–	Shehan Nissanka	(Sri Lanka)	32	Left-handed	Right-arm leg-break
All-rounders
40	Hashen Ramanayake (Captain)	(Sri Lanka)	30	Right-handed	Right-arm medium-fast
Wicket-keepers
14	Deshan Dias	(Sri Lanka)	33	Left-handed	–
–	Lisula Lakshan	(Sri Lanka)	30	Right-handed	–
Bowlers
36	Kevin Koththigoda	(Sri Lanka)	27	Left-handed	Right-arm leg-break
–	Sohaibullah	(Pakistan)	29	Left-handed	Left-arm medium-fast
–	Malindu Shehan	(Sri Lanka)	31	Right-handed	Right-arm medium-fast
34	**Tharindu Kaushal**	(Sri Lanka)	32	Right-handed	Right-arm off-break
–	Chameera	(Sri Lanka)	30	Right-handed	Slow left-arm orthodox
–	Duvindu Tillakaratne	(Sri Lanka)	29	Right-handed	Slow left-arm orthodox
–	Mohamed Shiraz	(Sri Lanka)	30	Right-handed	Right-arm medium-fast

== Notable players ==
- Ishara Amerasinghe
- Chinthaka Jayasinghe
- Lanka de Silva
- B. R. Heyn
- Jayantha Paranathala
- Nuwan Pradeep
- Anura Ranasinghe
- Andy Solomons
- Sajeewa Weerakoon
- Mohammed Shiraz
