= Ruwan =

Ruwan (Sinhala: රුවන්) is a Sri Lankan name that may refer to

- Ruwan Chathuranga (born 1989), Sri Lankan cricketer
- Ruwan Herath (born 1984), Sri Lankan cricketer
- Ruwan Kalpage (born 1970), Sri Lankan cricketer
- Ruwan Ranatunga (born 1971), Sri Lankan politician
- Ruwan Wijewardene (born 1975), Sri Lankan politician
- Jeewaka Ruwan Kulatunga, Sri Lankan Army major general
- Chaminda Ruwan (born 1979), Sri Lankan born cricketer
- Dilip Ruwan (born 1991), Sri Lankan sprinter
- Sammika Ruwan (born 1985), Sri Lankan cricketer
