= 2019 Clifford Cup =

Tournament details
- Tournament format(s): Knockout
- Date: 15 March 2019 – 24 March 2019

Tournament statistics
- Teams: 7
- Matches played: 6
- Top point scorer(s): Rizah Mubarak

Final
- Venue: Colombo Racecourse
- Champions: Havelock Sports Club (14th title)
- Runners-up: Air Force SC

The 84th Clifford Cup tournament was held between the 15 and 24 March 2019. The 2019 Clifford Cup took place after the conclusion of the regular season, with teams seeded based on their performance in the 2018-19 Dialog Rugby League season. The eventual winner was Havelock Sports Club, who last won the cup in 1981, thirty seven years ago.

Kandy SC, the defending cup holders, who finished in first place at the end of the domestic season two points ahead of Havelock Sports Club, dramatically withdrew from competition three days before the opening round. Kandy SC had requested the governing body, Sri Lanka Rugby to permit them to play all their matches at Nittawela Rugby Stadium. Sri Lanka Rugby however insisted that their games be held at the Pallekele International Cricket Stadium, stating that the other participating teams had all agreed that the matches be played on neutral grounds, resulting in Kandy SC resolving not to participate in the tournament.

The opening quarter-final match at the Colombo Racecourse ground pitted fourth placed Ceylonese Rugby & Football Club against the seventh placed Police SC. The two teams having beaten each other during the regular season. Police SC dominated the first half, scoring two tries and two penalties going into halftime with a 20-5 lead. In the second half CR &FC rallied scoring consecutive tries before Police SC replied with a second half try and a subsequent penalty to secure a 28 - 15 victory and a semi-final berth. The next scheduled match was declared a walkover with eighth seeded Air Force SC (who had only managed one win in the domestic season) securing a spot in the semi-finals following the withdrawal of the top seeded team in the competition, Kandy SC (the previous cup winner and the undefeated Dialog league champion). The fourth placed Colombo Hockey and Football Club then faced Army SC at the Colombo Racecourse. CH & FC scored an early try in the third minute of play and scored a second before Army SC responded with a try of their own. Both teams scored a try each before half time, with CH & FC going into the half time break with a 17 - 12 lead. After the break Army SC dominated play scoring a try to level the scores, with CH & FC responding some after with a try to regain the lead. Army SC scoring a subsequent try to level the score before breaking away for another try and a penalty to win 32-22. In the remaining quarter final match the second seed, Havelock SC, played their quarter final match against Navy SC, at Havelock Park. Havelock SC dominated the game scoring seven tries to three and advanced to the semi-finals.

Sri Lanka Rugby appointed Remi Julien, a French rugby referee, to officiate in the semi-finals and the final.

In the first semi-final encounter played at the Colombo racecourse Havelock SC defeated Army SC 60 points to 29 points, running in eight tries to four. Havelock SC produced a dominant display in the first half, scoring 31 points to Army SC's three. After the break Havelock SC went onto to score another 29 points whilst Army picked up 26 points. The other semi-final match between Police SC and Air Force SC, at the Colombo Racecourse on the following day, was a closer affair, with Police SC leading 16 - 14 at half time (two tries apiece). In the second half Air Force SC went on to score another two tries whilst Police could only manage the one. The victory took Air Force SC through to the finals for the first time since 1986.

The final was held at Colombo Racecourse on Sunday 24 March. Scrum half, Mithun Hapugoda, opened the scoring for Havelock SC with a try in the fourth minute of the game, which was converted by Rizah Mubarak. Air Force were awarded a penalty try in the tenth minute, whilst Zayan Sabar and Chamara Dabare crossed the line for Havelock SC in the thirteenth and eighteen minute mark, both of which were subsequently converted by Mubarak. The score line at half time was 21 - 14. After the break Air Force SC’s Ishara Madhushan scored a try in the 39th minute, which was converted by Charitha Senevirathne. Havelock SC went onto to convert three penalties, with Lasindu Karunathilaka scoring a try in the dying minutes of the game, which was converted by Mubarak, securing the victory for Havelock SC, 40 -21. The cup win was the first for Havelock SC in 37 years, when they won the triple crown – Sevens, Clifford Cup and the President’s trophy.

== Bracket ==
Quarter-finals
15 March 2019 - 16:15; Colombo Racecourse
CR & FC	15
Police SC	28
16 March 2019 - 16:15; Pallekele International Cricket Stadium
Kandy SC	-
Air Force SC	-
16 March 2019 - 16:15; Colombo Racecourse
Colombo Hockey and Football Club	22
Army SC	32
17 March 2019 - 16:15; Havelock Park
Havelock SC	48
Navy SC	19

Semi-finals
21 March 2019 - 16:00; Pallekele International Cricket Stadium
Police SC	23
Air Force SC	32
19 March 2019 - 16:00; Colombo Racecourse
Havelock SC	60
Army SC	29

Final
24 March 2019 - 16:15; Colombo Racecourse
Havelock Sports Club	40
Air Force SC	21

== Matches ==
=== Quarter-finals ===
16 March 2019
16:00

CR & FC	15 - 28	Police SC
Try: Reeza Raffaideen (1), Omalka Gunarathane (1), Supun Warnakulasooriya (1)	report	Try: Sachith Silva (1), Suranga Kasun (1), Vihanga Piwathu (1); Con: Janith Chandimal (2); Pen: Janith Chandimal (3)

Colombo Racecourse

16 March 2019
16:00

Kandy SC	forfeit by Kandy SC	Air Force SC
	report

Pallekele International Cricket Stadium

16 March 2019
16:00

Colombo Hockey and Football Club	22 - 32	Army SC
Try: Sathya Ranatunga (1), Dilshan Chathura (1), Anuradha Herath (1), Sajith Saranga (1); Con: Samuel Maduwantha (4)	report	Try: Ashan Bandara (2), Dhanushka Thalawatta (1), Sameera Bulathsinghala (1), Madura Bandara (1); Con: Isuru Medagedera (3), Gayan Salinda (1); Pen: Gayan Salinda (1)

Colombo Racecourse

17 March 2019
16:00

Havelock SC	48 - 19	Navy SC
Try: Mithun Hapugoda (2), Chamara Dabare (2), Umesha Madhushanka (1), Niroshan Fernando (1), Theekshana Dassanayake (1); Con: Rizah Mubarak (5); Pen: Rizah Mubarak (1)	report	Try: Kasun De Silva (1), Chathura Senevirathna (1), Ravin De Silva (1); Con: Thilina Weerasinghe (1), Chathura Senevirathna (1)

Havelock Park

=== Semi-finals ===
19 March 2019
16:00

Police SC	23 - 32	Air Force SC
	report

Colombo Racecourse

21 March 2019
16:00

Havelock Sports Club	60 - 29	Army SC
Try: Chamara Dabare (3), Mithun Hapugoda (1), Rizah Mubarak (1), Dinuk Amarasinghe (1), Keshan Kavindu (1), Theekshana Dassanayake (1)	report	Try: Ashan Bandara (2), N. Maduranga (1); Pen: Isuru Medagedara (1)

Colombo Racecourse

=== Final ===
24 March 2019
15:30

Havelock Sports Club	40 - 21	Air Force SC
Try: Lasindu Karunathilaka (1); Mithun Hapugoda (1); Zyan Sabar (1); Chamara Dabare (1); Con: Rizah Mubarak (4); Pen: Rizah Mubarak (4)	report	Try: Ishara Madhushan (1); Thilina Bandara (1); Con: Charitha Senevirathne (2); Pen: 1

Colombo Racecourse
Referee: Remi Julien (France)
Dinka Peiris, Sarath Madugalle
