= Sandakan (surname) =

Sandakan is a surname. Notable people with the surname include:

- Lakshan Sandakan (born 1991), Sri Lankan cricketer
- Nilanka Sandakan (born 1996), Sri Lankan cricketer
