= Jayalath =

Jayalath is both a given name and a surname. Notable people with the name include:

- Jayalath Jayawardena (1953–2013), Sri Lankan medical doctor
- Jayalath Manoratne (1948–2020), Sri Lankan actor
- Jayalath Weerakkody, Sri Lankan air officer
- Dilan Jayalath (born 1997), Sri Lankan cricketer
- Dileepa Jayalath (born 1997), Sri Lankan cricketer
- Florida Jayalath (1936–2007), Sri Lankan actress
- Karunasena Jayalath (1928–1994), Sri Lankan newspaper editor
