= Listh Saumedhe =

Sri Lankan cricketer (born 1981)

Listh Saumedhe (born Don Marasinghe Arachchilage Listh Saumedhe on 11 June 1981) was a Sri Lankan cricketer. He was a left-handed batsman and a left-arm medium-fast bowler who played for Bloomfield Cricket and Athletic Club. He was born in Colombo.

Saumedhe made a single first-class appearance for the side, during the 2000–01 season, against Tamil Union Cricket and Athletic Club. From the opening order, he scored 9 runs in the first innings in which he batted, and 11 not out in the second innings.

Saumedhe bowled five overs in the match, taking two wickets.
