= Wanniarachchi =

Wanniarachchi is a surname. Notable people with the surname include:

- Dharmadasa Wanniarachchi (1921-2007), Sri Lankan politician
- Manju Wanniarachchi (born 1979), Sri Lankan amateur boxer
- Neranjana Wanniarachchi (born 1998), Sri Lankan cricketer
- Pavithra Wanniarachchi, Sri Lankan politician
- Thisuri Wanniarachchi, Sri Lankan author
