= Sachithra =

Sachithra is a given name. Notable people with the name include:

- Sachithra Perera (born 1992), Sri Lankan cricketer
- Sachithra Senanayake (born 1985), Sri Lankan cricketer
- Sachithra Serasinghe (born 1987), Sri Lankan cricketer
