= Ubethilke Anuruddha =

Sri Lankan cricketer (born 1990)

Personal information
- Full name: Ubethilke Arachchige Thiwanka Anuruddha
- Born: 21 January 1990 (age 36); Colombo, Sri Lanka
- Source: ESPNcricinfo, 29 January 2017

Ubethilke Anuruddha (born 21 January 1990) is a Sri Lankan cricketer. He made his first-class debut for Bloomfield Cricket and Athletic Club in the 2016–17 Premier League Tournament on 27 January 2017. He made his List A debut for Anuradhaura District in the 2016–17 Districts One Day Tournament on 15 March 2017.
