= Raveen =

Raveen is a Sinhalese given name. Notable people with the name include:

- Raveen Sayer (born 1996), Sri Lankan cricketer
- Raveen Yasas (born 1999), Sri Lankan cricketer
- Tharuka Raveen (born 1997), Sri Lankan cricketer

== See also ==
- Raveena
