= Dinuk =

Dinuk is a Sinhalese given name. Notable people with the name include:

- Dinuk Wijeratne (born 1978), Sri Lankan-born Canadian conductor, composer, and pianist
- Dinuk Wikramanayaka (born 1994), Sri Lankan cricketer
