= Navod =

Navod is a Sinhalese masculine given name that may refer to the following notable Sri Lankan cricketers:

- Navod Ilukwatta (born 1991)
- Navod Madushanka Weeratunga (born 1996)
- Navod Paranavithana (born 2002)
