= Nalin Perera =

Nalin Perera may refer to:

- Nalin Perera (judge)
- Nalin Perera (singer)
- Nalin Perera (cricketer)
