= Mohomad Akram =

Sri Lankan cricketer (born 1997)

Personal information
- Full name: Mohammed Nawfer Mohammed Akram
- Born: 12 June 1997 (age 29); Colombo, Sri Lanka
- Source: ESPNcricinfo, 23 December 2016

Mohammed Nawfer Mohammed Akram (born 12 June 1997) is a Sri Lankan cricketer. He made his first-class debut for Bloomfield Cricket and Athletic Club in the 2016–17 Premier League Tournament on 21 December 2016. He made his List A debut for Anuradhaura District in the 2016–17 Districts One Day Tournament on 22 March 2017.
