= Shelley Wickramasinghe =

Sri Lankan cricketer

Shelton Donald Mendis Wickramasinghe
Personal information
- Born: November 1925; Balapitiya, Sri Lanka
- Died: 10 August 2011; Colombo, Sri Lanka

Domestic team information
- Years: Team
- Bloomfield Cricket and Athletic Club

Shelley Wickramasinghe (1926–10 August 2011) was a Sri Lankan cricketer.

He started his cricket career at Kalutara Vidyalaya and then move to St. Peter's College, Colombo. From 1972 to 2000, he represented Bloomfield Cricket and Athletic Club and served as its president three times.

Wickramasinghe also contributed to cricket administration serving as president of the Mercantile Cricket Association and chairman of the National Sports Council. In the mid-eighties he was also vice-president of Sri Lanka Cricket.

Wickramasinghe died aged 85 on 10 August 2011.
