= Malith de Silva (cricketer, born 1995) =

Sri Lankan cricketer (born 1995)

Personal information
- Full name: Kaludewa Malith Mahela de Silva
- Born: 12 April 1995 (age 31); Galle, Sri Lanka
- Source: ESPNcricinfo, 3 December 2016

Malith de Silva (born 12 April 1995) is a Sri Lankan cricketer. He made his first-class debut for Bloomfield Cricket and Athletic Club in the 2016–17 Premier League Tournament on 3 December 2016. He made his List A debut for Anuradhaura District in the 2016–17 Districts One Day Tournament on 15 March 2017. He made his Twenty20 debut on 6 January 2016, for Galle Cricket Club in the AIA Premier T20 Tournament.
