= Raveena =

Raveena is a given name. Notable people with the name include:

- Raveena Ravi (born 1993), Indian voice actress
- Raveena Tandon (born 1974), Indian actress, model, and producer
- Raveena Aurora (born 1993), American singer-songwriter mononymously known as Raveena
- Raveena Daha (born 2003), Indian actress and dancer
- Raveena Desraj Shrestha (born 1970), former CEO of Mega Bank Nepal

== See also ==
- Raveen
- Simply Baatein with Raveena, Indian television chat show
