= Dilshan de Soysa =

Sri Lankan cricketer (born 1995)

Personal information
- Born: 9 January 1995 (age 31); Balapitiya, Sri Lanka
- Source: ESPNcricinfo, 23 December 2016

Dilshan de Soysa (born 9 January 1995) is a Sri Lankan cricketer. He made his first-class debut for Sri Lanka Army Sports Club in the 2016–17 Premier League Tournament on 21 December 2016. He made his List A debut for Badulla District in the 2016–17 Districts One Day Tournament on 29 March 2017. He made his Twenty20 debut for Sri Lanka Army Sports Club in the 2017–18 SLC Twenty20 Tournament on 1 March 2018.
