= Sri Lankan cricket team in New Zealand in 2014–15 =

International cricket tour

Sri Lankan cricket team in New Zealand in 2014-15
	New Zealand	Sri Lanka
- Dates: 26 December 2014 – 29 January 2015
Captains	Brendon McCullum (1st to 6th ODIs); Kane Williamson (7th ODI)	Angelo Mathews (1st to 4th ODIs); Lahiru Thirimanne (5th to 7th ODIs)

Test series
- Result: New Zealand won the 2-match series 2–0
Most runs	Kane Williamson (396)	Kumar Sangakkara (215)
Most wickets	Trent Boult (11)	Nuwan Pradeep (7)

One Day International series
- Results: New Zealand won the 7-match series 4–2
Most runs	Kane Williamson (295)	Tillakaratne Dilshan (397)
Most wickets	Mitchell McClenaghan (10)	Nuwan Kulasekara (8)
- Player of the series: Kane Williamson (NZ)

The Sri Lankan national cricket team toured New Zealand from 26 December 2014 to 29 January 2015 for a tour consisting of two Test matches and seven One Day Internationals. New Zealand won the Test series 2–0 and the ODI series 4–2.

Following the tour the Sri Lankan team stayed in the region to participate in the 2015 ICC Cricket World Cup. The Test match played at Hagley Oval, Christchurch was the first major event to take place in the city since the 2011 Christchurch earthquake.

After the fourth ODI, Sri Lanka skipper Angelo Mathews was injured and captaincy shifted to vice captain Lahiru Thirimanne for the remaining three ODIs. New Zealand skipper Brendon McCullum also did not play the last ODI, where Kane Williamson was the skipper.

== Squads ==
Tests		ODIs	
New Zealand	Sri Lanka	New Zealand	Sri Lanka
Brendon McCullum (C); Trent Boult; Doug Bracewell; Dean Brownlie; Mark Craig; Tom Latham; James Neesham; Hamish Rutherford; Tim Southee; Ross Taylor; Neil Wagner; BJ Watling (WK); Kane Williamson	Angelo Mathews (C); Dushmantha Chameera; Dinesh Chandimal; Niroshan Dickwella (WK); Shaminda Eranga; Rangana Herath; Prasanna Jayawardene (WK); Dimuth Karunaratne; Tharindu Kaushal; Suranga Lakmal; Dilruwan Perera; Nuwan Pradeep; Dhammika Prasad; Kumar Sangakkara; Kaushal Silva; Lahiru Thirimanne	Brendon McCullum (C); Corey Anderson; Trent Boult; Grant Elliott; Martin Guptill; Matt Henry; Tom Latham; Mitchell McClenaghan; Nathan McCullum; Kyle Mills; Adam Milne; Tim Southee; Ross Taylor; Luke Ronchi (WK); Daniel Vettori; Kane Williamson	Angelo Mathews (C); Dushmantha Chameera; Dinesh Chandimal (WK); Tillakaratne Dilshan; Shaminda Eranga; Rangana Herath; Mahela Jayawardene; Dimuth Karunaratne; Nuwan Kulasekara; Suranga Lakmal; Lasith Malinga; Jeevan Mendis; Thisara Perera; Dhammika Prasad; Kumar Sangakkara; Sachithra Senanayake; Lahiru Thirimanne (VC)

== Tour match ==
=== New Zealand XI v Sri Lankans ===
21–22 December 2014

Sri Lankans	v	New Zealand XI
173/9d (59 overs); Lahiru Thirimanne 50 (113); Ben McCord 3/30 (15 overs)		125 (39.5 overs); Jono Hickey 57 (92); Dushmantha Chameera 3/13 (4 overs)
261/8d (62.2 overs); Niroshan Dickwella 63 (70); Jamie Gibson 2/36 (10 overs)

Match Drawn
Queenstown Events Centre, Queenstown
Umpires: Tim Parlane (NZ) and Phil Jones (NZ)

- Sri Lankans won the toss and elected to bat

== Test series ==
=== 1st Test ===
26–30 December 2014
Scorecard

New Zealand	v	Sri Lanka
441 (85.5 overs); Brendon McCullum 195 (134); Angelo Mathews 3/39 (12 overs)		138 (42.4 overs); Angelo Mathews 50 (85); Trent Boult 3/25 (11 overs)
107/2 (30.4 overs); Ross Taylor 39* (63); Shaminda Eranga 1/20 (7 overs)		407 (154 overs)f/o Dimuth Karunaratne 152 (363); Tim Southee 4/91 (37 overs)

New Zealand won by 8 wickets
Hagley Oval, Christchurch
Umpires: Richard Illingworth (Eng) and Bruce Oxenford (Aus)
Player of the match: Brendon McCullum (NZ)

- Sri Lanka won the toss and elected to field.
- Tharindu Kaushal (SL) made his Test debut.
- Brendon McCullum scored the fastest Test century by a New Zealand batsman.

=== 2nd Test ===
3–7 January 2015
Scorecard

New Zealand	v	Sri Lanka
221 (55.1 overs); Kane Williamson 69 (115); Nuwan Pradeep 4/63 (16 overs)		356 (102.1 overs); Kumar Sangakkara 203 (306); Jimmy Neesham 3/42 (11 overs)
524/5d (172 overs); Kane Williamson 242* (483); Nuwan Pradeep 3/117 (37 overs)		196 (72.4 overs); Lahiru Thirimanne 62* (144); Mark Craig 4/53 (18 overs)

New Zealand won by 193 runs
Basin Reserve, Wellington
Umpires: Steve Davis (Aus) and Richard Illingworth (Eng)
Player of the match: Kane Williamson (NZ)

- Sri Lanka won the toss and elected to field.
- Kumar Sangakkara (SL) became the fifth batsman to score 12,000 runs in Test cricket.
- BJ Watling and Kane Williamson broke the record for the highest 6th wicket partnership in Test history with their unbeaten 365-run stand.

== ODI series ==
=== 1st ODI ===
11 January 2015
Scorecard

Sri Lanka; 218/9 (50 overs)	v	New Zealand; 219/7 (23 overs)
Mahela Jayawardene 104 (77); Mitchell McClenaghan 4/76 (10 overs)		Corey Anderson 101 (34); Tillakaratne Dilshan 2/28 (7 overs)

New Zealand won by 3 wickets
Hagley Oval, Christchurch
Umpires: Chris Gaffaney (NZ) and Nigel Llong (Eng)
Player of the match: Corey Anderson (NZ)

- Sri Lanka won the toss and elected to bat.

=== 2nd ODI ===
15 January 2015 (D/N)
Scorecard

New Zealand; 248 (50 overs)	v	Sri Lanka; 252/4 (47.4 overs)
Brendon McCullum 117 (99); Rangana Herath 2/36 (10 overs)		Tillakaratne Dilshan 116 (127); Matt Henry 2/34 (9.4 overs)

Sri Lanka won by 6 wickets
Seddon Park, Hamilton
Umpires: Chris Gaffaney (NZ) and Ian Gould (Eng)
Player of the match: Tillakaratne Dilshan (SL)

- New Zealand won the toss and elected to bat.

=== 3rd ODI ===
17 January 2015
Scorecard

New Zealand; 145/3 (28.5 overs)	v	Sri Lanka
Martin Guptill 66* (78); Angelo Mathews 3/21 (6.5 overs)

No result
Eden Park, Auckland
Umpires: Billy Bowden (NZ) and Nigel Llong (Eng)

- Sri Lanka won the toss and elected to field.
- Rain affected play three times, with the match being abandoned after 28.5 overs of the New Zealand innings.

=== 4th ODI ===
20 January 2015
Scorecard

Sri Lanka; 276 (49.3 overs)	v	New Zealand; 280/6 (48.1 overs)
Mahela Jayawardene 94 (82); Tim Southee 3/59 (10 overs)		Kane Williamson 103 (107); Angelo Mathews 1/16 (4 overs)

New Zealand won by 4 wickets
Saxton Oval, Nelson
Umpires: Ian Gould (Eng) and Derek Walker (NZ)
Player of the match: Kane Williamson (NZ)

- Sri Lanka won the toss and elected to bat.

=== 5th ODI ===
23 January 2015
Scorecard

New Zealand; 360/5 (50 overs)	v	Sri Lanka; 252 (43.5 overs)
Luke Ronchi 170* (99); Lahiru Thirimanne 2/36 (7 overs)		Tillakaratne Dilshan 116 (156); Trent Boult 4/44 (10 overs)

New Zealand won by 108 runs
University Oval, Dunedin
Umpires: Nigel Llong (Eng) and Chris Gaffaney (NZ)
Player of the match: Luke Ronchi and Grant Elliott (NZ)

- Sri Lanka won the toss and elected to field.
- Luke Ronchi scored his maiden ODI century and the highest ODI score by a New Zealand wicket-keeper.
- Luke Ronchi and Grant Elliott put on the highest 6th wicket partnership (267*) in ODIs.
- The Man of the Match adjudicators could not split Ronchi and Elliott as the best player therefore they decided on joint Man of the Match winners.

=== 6th ODI ===
25 January 2015
11:00 AM
Scorecard

New Zealand; 315/8 (50 overs)	v	Sri Lanka; 195 (40.3 overs)
Kane Williamson 97 (95); Dhammika Prasad 2/59(10 overs)		Kumar Sangakkara 81 (66); Corey Anderson 4/52 (10 overs)

New Zealand won by 120 runs
University Oval, Dunedin
Umpires: Michael Gough (Eng) and Derek Walker (NZ)
Player of the match: Corey Anderson (NZ)

- New Zealand won the toss and elected to bat.
- Only the 2nd instance for New Zealand and 2nd instance against Sri Lanka of two batsmen scoring 90s in the same innings.
- Daniel Vettori became the most capped New Zealand ODI cricketer.
- Kumar Sangakkara went past Ricky Ponting into 2nd position as Batsmen with most 50+ scores in ODI.

=== 7th ODI ===
29 January 2015
Scorecard

Sri Lanka; 287/6 (50 overs)	v	New Zealand; 253 (45.2 overs)
Kumar Sangakkara 113* (105); Corey Anderson 3/59 (9 overs)		Kane Williamson 54 (83); Shaminda Eranga 2/31 (8 overs)

Sri Lanka won by 34 runs
Westpac Stadium, Wellington
Umpires: Chris Gaffaney (NZ) and Rod Tucker (Aus)
Player of the match: Kumar Sangakkara (SL)

- Sri Lanka won the toss and elected to bat.
- Dushmantha Chameera (SL) made his ODI debut.
- Kumar Sangakkara (SL) set a new world record for the most dismissals (473) by a wicketkeeper in ODI games.
