= Disnaka Manoj =

Sri Lankan cricketer (born 1997)

Personal information
- Full name: Koonakkara Gedera Disnaka Manoj Ariyaratne
- Born: 13 January 1997 (age 29)
- Source: ESPNcricinfo, 2 December 2016

Disnaka Manoj (born 13 January 1997) is a Sri Lankan cricketer. He made his first-class debut for Tamil Union Cricket and Athletic Club in the 2016–17 Premier League Tournament on 2 December 2016. He made his List A debut for Jaffna District in the 2016–17 Districts One Day Tournament on 25 March 2017. He made his Twenty20 debut for Tamil Union Cricket and Athletic Club in the 2017–18 SLC Twenty20 Tournament on 27 February 2018.
