= Ramindu de Silva =

Sri Lankan cricketer (born 1996)

Personal information
- Full name: Deva Ramindu Nikeshala de Silva
- Born: 16 July 1996 (age 30); Galle, Sri Lanka
- Source: ESPNcricinfo, 12 January 2017

Ramindu de Silva (born 16 July 1996) is a Sri Lankan cricketer. He made his first-class debut for Nondescripts Cricket Club in the 2016–17 Premier League Tournament on 11 January 2017.
