= Samith Tillakaratne =

Sri Lankan cricketer (born 1978)

Samitha Tillakaratne (born 20 November 1978) was a Sri Lankan cricketer. He was a right-handed batsman and wicket-keeper who played for Tamil Union Cricket and Athletic Club. He was born in Galle.

Tillakaratne made a single first-class appearance for the side, during the 2000–01 season, against Bloomfield Cricket and Athletic Club. From the opening order, he scored 7 runs in the first innings in which he batted, and 9 runs in the second.

In addition to his club career, Tillakaratne was the captain of St. Aloysius College 1st XI cricket team during the 1997/98 season.

In the 1998 season, St. Aloysius College played 13 matches, with Samitha Tillekeratne leading the team as a 4th-year player. Tillekeratne served as their middle-order batsman and also fulfilled the role of wicketkeeper for the side.
