= Thiran Dhanapala =

Sri Lankan cricketer (born 1996)

Personal information
- Full name: Thiran Ruvintha Dhanapala
- Born: 17 September 1996 (age 30); Colombo, Sri Lanka
- Source: ESPNcricinfo, 3 December 2016

Thiran Dhanapala (born 17 September 1996) is a Sri Lankan cricketer. He made his first-class debut for Bloomfield Cricket and Athletic Club in the 2016–17 Premier League Tournament on 3 December 2016. He made his List A debut for Anuradhaura District in the 2016–17 Districts One Day Tournament on 21 March 2017. He made his Twenty20 debut for Bloomfield Cricket and Athletic Club in the 2017–18 SLC Twenty20 Tournament on 1 March 2018.
