= Shiran Ratnayake =

Sri Lankan cricketer (born 1995)

Personal information
- Born: 21 March 1999 (age 27); Ragama, Sri Lanka
- Source: ESPNcricinfo, 29 December 2016

Shiran Ratnayake (born 21 March 1999) is a Sri Lankan cricketer. He made his first-class debut for Badureliya Sports Club in the 2016–17 Premier League Tournament on 28 December 2016. He made his List A debut for Ampara District in the 2016–17 Districts One Day Tournament on 25 March 2017.
