= Indian cricket team in Sri Lanka in 2024 =

International cricket tour

	Sri Lanka	India
- Dates: 27 July – 7 August 2024
Captains	Charith Asalanka	Rohit Sharma (ODIs); Suryakumar Yadav (T20Is)

One Day International series
- Results: Sri Lanka won the 3-match series 2–0
Most runs	Avishka Fernando (137)	Rohit Sharma (157)
Most wickets	Jeffrey Vandersay (8)	Washington Sundar (5)
- Player of the series: Dunith Wellalage (SL)

Twenty20 International series
- Results: India won the 3-match series 3–0
Most runs	Pathum Nissanka (137)	Suryakumar Yadav (92)
Most wickets	Matheesha Pathirana (5)	Ravi Bishnoi (6)
- Player of the series: Suryakumar Yadav (Ind)

The Indian cricket team toured Sri Lanka in July and August 2024 to play the Sri Lanka cricket team. The tour consisted of three Twenty20 International (T20I) and three One Day International (ODI) matches. In November 2023, Sri Lanka Cricket (SLC) announced its international calendar for 2024 and confirmed the bilateral series. India last toured Sri Lanka in 2021. In July 2024, Sri Lanka Cricket confirmed the fixtures for the tour.

This was Gautam Gambhir's first assignment as head coach and Suryakumar Yadav's first series as full-time T20I captain of India. India won the T20I series whitewashing Sri Lanka by 3-0. However, Sri Lanka won the ODI series defeating India by 2-0. It was their first bilateral ODI-series win in 27 years against India since 1997.

== Squads ==
Sri Lanka		India	
ODIs	T20Is	ODIs	T20Is
Charith Asalanka (c); Akila Dananjaya; Asitha Fernando; Avishka Fernando; Wanindu Hasaranga; Chamika Karunaratne; Janith Liyanage; Nishan Madushka; ~~Dilshan Madushanka~~; Eshan Malinga; Kamindu Mendis; Kusal Mendis (wk); Pathum Nissanka; ~~Matheesha Pathirana~~; Sadeera Samarawickrama; Mohamed Shiraz; Maheesh Theekshana; Jeffrey Vandersay; Dunith Wellalage	Charith Asalanka (c); ~~Dushmantha Chameera~~; Dinesh Chandimal (wk); Asitha Fernando; Avishka Fernando; ~~Binura Fernando~~; Wanindu Hasaranga; Dilshan Madushanka; Kamindu Mendis; Kusal Mendis (wk); Ramesh Mendis; Pathum Nissanka; Matheesha Pathirana; Kusal Perera (wk); Dasun Shanaka; Maheesh Theekshana; ~~Nuwan Thushara~~; Dunith Wellalage; Chamindu Wickramasinghe	Rohit Sharma (c); Shubman Gill (vc); Khaleel Ahmed; Shivam Dube; Shreyas Iyer; Virat Kohli; Rishabh Pant (wk); Riyan Parag; Axar Patel; KL Rahul (wk); Harshit Rana; Arshdeep Singh; Mohammed Siraj; Washington Sundar; Kuldeep Yadav	Suryakumar Yadav (c); Shubman Gill (vc); Khaleel Ahmed; Ravi Bishnoi; Shivam Dube; Yashasvi Jaiswal; Hardik Pandya; Rishabh Pant (wk); Riyan Parag; Axar Patel; Sanju Samson (wk); Arshdeep Singh; Rinku Singh; Mohammed Siraj; Washington Sundar

On 24 July 2024, Dushmantha Chameera was ruled out of the series due to bronchitis, Asitha Fernando was named as his replacement. On 25 July 2024, Nuwan Thushara was ruled out of the T20I series with a broken finger in his left hand, Dilshan Madushanka was named as his replacement. On 26 July, Binura Fernando was hospitalized due to a chest infection, Ramesh Mendis was added to the squad as a stand-by player. On 1 August 2024, both Matheesha Pathirana and Dilshan Madushanka were ruled out due to injuries and were replaced by Mohamed Shiraz and Eshan Malinga. Kusal Perera, Pramod Madushan and Jeffrey Vandersay were added to the squad as stand-by players. On 3 August 2024, Wanindu Hasaranga was ruled out of the rest of the ODI matches due to hamstring injury and was replaced by Jeffrey Vandersay.

== T20I series ==
=== 1st T20I ===
27 July 2024
19:00 (N)
Scorecard

India; 213/7 (20 overs)	v	Sri Lanka; 170 (19.2 overs)
Suryakumar Yadav 58 (26); Matheesha Pathirana 4/40 (4 overs)		Pathum Nissanka 79 (48); Riyan Parag 3/5 (1.2 overs)

India won by 43 runs
Pallekele International Cricket Stadium, Kandy
Umpires: Ruchira Palliyaguruge (SL) and Raveendra Wimalasiri (SL)
Player of the match: Suryakumar Yadav (Ind)

- Sri Lanka won the toss and elected to field.

=== 2nd T20I ===
28 July 2024
19:00 (N)
Scorecard

Sri Lanka; 161/9 (20 overs)	v	India; 81/3 (6.3 overs)
Kusal Perera 53 (34); Ravi Bishnoi 3/26 (4 overs)		Yashasvi Jaiswal 30 (15); Maheesh Theekshana 1/16 (2 overs)

India won by 7 wickets (DLS method)
Pallekele International Cricket Stadium, Kandy
Umpires: Ruchira Palliyaguruge (SL) and Prageeth Rambukwella (SL)
Player of the match: Ravi Bishnoi (Ind)

- India won the toss and elected to field.
- India were set a revised target of 78 runs from 8 overs due to rain.

=== 3rd T20I ===
30 July 2024
19:00 (N)
Scorecard

India; 137/9 (20 overs)	v	Sri Lanka; 137/8 (20 overs)
Shubman Gill 39 (37); Maheesh Theekshana 3/28 (4 overs)		Kusal Perera 46 (34); Rinku Singh 2/3 (1 over)

Match tied (India won the Super Over)
Pallekele International Cricket Stadium, Kandy
Umpires: Ruchira Palliyaguruge (SL) and Raveendra Wimalasiri (SL)
Player of the match: Washington Sundar (Ind)

- Sri Lanka won the toss and elected to field.
- Chamindu Wickramasinghe (SL) made his T20I debut.
- Super Over: Sri Lanka 2/2, India 4/0

== ODI series ==
=== 1st ODI ===
2 August 2024
14:30 (D/N)
Scorecard

Sri Lanka; 230/8 (50 overs)	v	India; 230 (47.5 overs)
Dunith Wellalage 67* (65); Axar Patel 2/33 (10 overs)		Rohit Sharma 58 (47); Charith Asalanka 3/30 (8.5 overs)

Match tied
R. Premadasa Stadium, Colombo
Umpires: Joel Wilson (WI) and Raveendra Wimalasiri (SL)
Player of the match: Dunith Wellalage (SL)

- Sri Lanka won the toss and elected to bat.
- Mohamed Shiraz (SL) made his ODI debut.

=== 2nd ODI ===
4 August 2024
14:30 (D/N)
Scorecard

Sri Lanka; 240/9 (50 overs)	v	India; 208 (42.2 overs)
Kamindu Mendis 40(44) Avishka Fernando 40(62); Washington Sundar 3/30 (10 overs)		Rohit Sharma 64 (44); Jeffrey Vandersay 6/33 (10 overs)

Sri Lanka won by 32 runs
R. Premadasa Stadium, Colombo
Umpires: Paul Reiffel (Aus) and Raveendra Wimalasiri (SL)
Player of the match: Jeffrey Vandersay (SL)

- Sri Lanka won the toss and elected to bat.
- Jeffrey Vandersay (SL) took his first five-wicket haul in ODIs.

=== 3rd ODI ===
7 August 2024
14:30 (D/N)
Scorecard

Sri Lanka; 248/7 (50 overs)	v	India; 138 (26.1 overs)
Avishka Fernando 96 (102); Riyan Parag 3/54 (9 overs)		Rohit Sharma 35 (20); Dunith Wellalage 5/27 (5.1 overs)

Sri Lanka won by 110 runs
R. Premadasa Stadium, Colombo
Umpires: Ruchira Palliyaguruge (SL) and Joel Wilson (WI)
Player of the match: Avishka Fernando (SL)

- Sri Lanka won the toss and elected to bat.
- Riyan Parag (Ind) made his ODI debut.
