= Dineth Thimodya =

Sri Lankan cricketer (born 1996)

Personal information
- Full name: Dineth Thimodya Hewathantri
- Born: 20 August 1996 (age 30)
- Source: ESPNcricinfo, 8 January 2017

Dineth Thimodya (born 20 August 1996) is a Sri Lankan cricketer. He made his first-class debut for Tamil Union Cricket and Athletic Club in the 2016–17 Premier League Tournament on 6 January 2017.
