= Lakkana Jayasekera =

Sri Lankan cricketer (born 1996)

Personal information
- Born: 26 March 1996 (age 30); Colombo, Sri Lanka
- Batting: Right-handed
- Bowling: Right-arm offbreak
- Source: Cricinfo, 9 December 2016

Lakkana Jayasekera (born 26 March 1996) is a Sri Lankan cricketer. He made his first-class debut for Badureliya Sports Club in the 2016–17 Premier League Tournament on 9 December 2016. He made his List A debut for Ampara District in the 2016–17 Districts One Day Tournament on 18 March 2017.
