= Hashan Upendra =

Sri Lankan cricketer (born 1997)

Personal information
- Born: 14 April 1997 (age 29); Colombo, Sri Lanka
- Source: ESPNcricinfo, 31 January 2017

Hashan Upendra (born 14 April 1997) is a Sri Lankan cricketer. He made his first-class debut for Nondescripts Cricket Club in the 2016–17 Premier League Tournament on 28 January 2017. He made his List A debut for Matara District in the 2016–17 Districts One Day Tournament on 17 March 2017. He made his Twenty20 debut for Badureliya Sports Club in the 2017–18 SLC Twenty20 Tournament on 24 February 2018.
