= Chameera =

Chameera is both a given name and a surname. Notable people with the name include:

- Chameera Dissanayake (born 1995), Sri Lankan cricketer
- Chameera Sajith Kumara (born1989), Sri Lankan footballer
- Chalana Chameera, Sri Lankan footballer
- Dushmantha Chameera (born 1992), Sri Lankan cricketer
