= Yasas Alwis =

Sri Lankan cricketer (born 1992)

Personal information
- Born: 9 September 1992 (age 34); Colombo, Sri Lanka
- Source: ESPNcricinfo, 7 February 2017

Yasas Alwis (born 9 September 1992) is a Sri Lankan cricketer. He made his first-class debut for Nondescripts Cricket Club in the 2016–17 Premier League Tournament on 5 February 2017.
