= Neranjana Wanniarachchi =

Sri Lankan cricketer (born 1998)

Personal information
- Born: 9 June 1998 (age 28); Colombo, Sri Lanka
- Source: ESPNcricinfo, 10 December 2016

Neranjana Wanniarachchi (born 9 June 1998) is a Sri Lankan cricketer. He made his first-class debut for Burgher Recreation Club in the 2016–17 Premier League Tournament on 9 December 2016.
