= Shashrika Pussegolla =

Sri Lankan cricketer (born 1987)

Personal information
- Born: 14 July 1987 (age 39); Colombo, Sri Lanka
- Source: ESPNcricinfo, 29 December 2016

Shashrika Pussegolla (born 14 July 1987) is a Sri Lankan cricketer. He made his first-class debut for Saracens Sports Club in the 2008–09 Premier Trophy on 14 November 2008.
