= Imran Khan (Sri Lankan cricketer) =

Sri Lankan cricketer

Personal information
- Born: 10 May 1992 (age 34); Colombo, Sri Lanka
- Batting: Left-handed
- Bowling: Right-arm fast-medium
- Role: Bowler

Domestic team information
- Years: Team
- 2012: Saracens SC
- 2012: Ruhuna Royals
- 2012–2015: Bloomfield C&AC

Career statistics
Competition	FC	LA	T20
Matches	17	11	3
Runs scored	110	24	2
Batting average	10.00	12.00	–
100s/50s	0/0	0/0	0/0
Top score	25*	9*	2*
Balls bowled	2,058	326	44
Wickets	39	11	3
Bowling average	39.12	24.90	18.33
5 wickets in innings	1	0	0
10 wickets in match	0	0	0
Best bowling	5/67	3/29	2/33
Catches/stumpings	9/–	4/–	1/–
- Source: CricketArchive, 8 July 2015

Imran Khan (born 10 May 1992) is a Sri Lankan cricketer who has played domestically for the Saracens Sports Club and the Bloomfield Cricket and Athletic Club, as well as in the Sri Lanka Premier League for the Ruhuna Royals.

Born in Colombo, Imran attended Royal College, Colombo, and played for the school's cricket team in the annual Royal–Thomian match in both 2010 and 2011. A right-arm fast bowler, he made his first-class debut during the 2011–12 season, appearing for Saracens in a single match against Sri Lanka Army SC. He opened the bowling with Amila Mendis on debut, taking two wickets as Saracens lost by an innings and 90 runs. Imran was subsequently selected in a single Premier League match for the Ruhuna Royals in August 2012, replacing Tharanga Lakshitha in the side.

For the 2012–13 season, Imran switched to Bloomfield, making his list-A debut in the Premier Limited Overs Tournament in December 2012. He went on to play three list-A matches and seven first-class matches during the season. In his seven Premier Trophy matches, he took 21 wickets, finishing behind Suraj Randiv (50), Upul Indrasiri (29), and Chatura Randunu (25) for Bloomfield. His best bowling figures, 5/67, came against the Panadura Sports Club in the opening match of the tournament. Imran again played regularly for Bloomfield during the 2013–14 season, in both formats of the game, but is yet to record any further five-wicket hauls. His appearances during the 2014–15 were less sporadic – only three first-class games and a single twenty20.
