= Saracens Sports Club =

Saracens SC
- One Day name: Saracens SC

Personnel
- Captain: (Sri Lanka) Milinda Siriwardana
- Coach: (Sri Lanka) Ayesh De Silva

History
- Premier Trophy wins: 1
- Premier Limited Overs Tournament wins: none
- Twenty20 Tournament wins: none

The Saracens Sports Club (Saracens SC) is a Sri Lankan first-class cricket team that competes in the Premier Trophy.

== Honours ==
- Premier Trophy (1)

2008–09 (Tier B)

== Current squad ==
Players with international caps are listed in bold

No	Name	Nat	Age	Batting style	Bowling style
Batsmen
57	**Milinda Siriwardana**	(Sri Lanka)	39	Left-handed	Leftt-arm Slow left-arm orthodox
14	**Ruvindu Gunasekera**	(Canada)	34	Left-handed	Right-arm leg-break
15	Ashen Bandara	(Sri Lanka)	26	Right-handed	Right-arm leg-break
27	Gamindu Kanishka	(Sri Lanka)	38	Right-handed	Right-arm medium
–	Mishen Silva	(Sri Lanka)	27	Right-handed	Right-arm medium-fast
–	Minhaj Jaleel	(Sri Lanka)	30	Right-handed	Right-arm off-break
–	Atif Ali	(Pakistan)	41	Right-handed	Right-arm off-break
All-rounders
–	Rizwan Haider	(Pakistan)	40	Left-handed	Left-arm medium-fast
29	Andy Solomons	(Sri Lanka)	38	Right-handed	Right-arm fast-medium
78	Saliya Saman	(Sri Lanka)	39	Right-handed	Right-arm medium-fast
Wicket-keepers
2	Thanuka Dabare	(Sri Lanka)	27	Left-handed	–
10	Harsha Cooray (Captain)	(Sri Lanka)	41	Right-handed	Right-arm off-break
18	Navindu Vithanage	(Sri Lanka)	27	Right-handed	–
–	Promod Maduwantha	(Sri Lanka)	28	Left-handed	–
Bowlers
1	Sachithra Perera	(Sri Lanka)	33	Right-handed	Right-arm leg-break
7	Chathura Randunu	(Sri Lanka)	41	Left-handed	Slow left-arm orthodox
98	Roshan Jayatissa	(Sri Lanka)	36	Right-handed	Right-arm off-break
–	Chanaka Devinda	(Sri Lanka)	28	Right-handed	Slow left-arm orthodox
–	Ranitha Liyanarachchi	(Sri Lanka)	31	Left-handed	Right-arm fast-medium
–	Mohomed Dilshad	(Sri Lanka)	33	Left-handed	Left-arm fast-medium
