= Promod Maduwantha =

Sri Lankan cricketer (born 1997)

Personal information
- Born: 31 May 1997 (age 29); Colombo, Sri Lanka
- Batting: Left-handed
- Bowling: Right-arm offbreak
- Source: ESPNcricinfo, 30 December 2016

Promod Maduwantha (born 31 May 1997) is a Sri Lankan cricketer. He made his first-class debut for Moors Sports Club in the 2016–17 Premier League Tournament on 28 December 2016. He made his List A debut for Nuwara Eliya District in the 2016–17 Districts One Day Tournament on 15 March 2017. He was the leading run-scorer for Saracens Sports Club in the 2018–19 Premier League Tournament, with 729 runs in eight matches. He made his Twenty20 debut on 12 January 2020, for Saracens Sports Club in the 2019–20 SLC Twenty20 Tournament.
