= Chathura Randunu =

Sri Lankan cricketer (born 1984)

Personal information
- Born: 1 April 1984 (age 42); Colombo, Sri Lanka
- Source: Cricinfo, 29 January 2016

Chathura Randunu (born 1 April 1984) is a Sri Lankan first-class cricketer who plays for Bloomfield Cricket and Athletic Club.He was an alumnus of Mahanama College.

In April 2018, he was named in Galle's squad for the 2018 Super Provincial One Day Tournament.
