= Tharindu Kaushal =

Sri Lankan cricketer

Tharindu Kaushal තරිදු කෞශාල්
Personal information
- Full name: Paskuwal Handi Tharindu Kaushal
- Born: 5 March 1993 (age 33); Rathgama, Sri Lanka
- Nickname: Kaushee
- Height: 5 ft 8 in (1.73 m)
- Batting: Right-handed
- Bowling: Right-arm off break
- Role: Bowler

International information
- National side: Sri Lanka (2014–2016)
- Test debut (cap 128): 26 December 2015 v New Zealand
- Last Test: 14 October 2016 v West Indies
- Only ODI (cap 163): 18 March 2015 v South Africa

Domestic team information
- Years: Team
- 2013–: Nondescripts Cricket Club

Career statistics
Competition	Test	ODI	FC	LA
Matches	7	1	37	32
Runs scored	106	0	804	111
Batting average	10.60	0.00	21.72	9.25
100s/50s	0/0	0/0	0/5	0/0
Top score	18	0	80	28
Balls bowled	1,652	36	7,661	1,450
Wickets	25	0	221	54
Bowling average	44.20	–	22.11	18.57
5 wickets in innings	2	0	24	2
10 wickets in match	0	0	5	0
Best bowling	5/42	–	8/131	5/27
Catches/stumpings	3/–	0/–	17/–	5/–
- Source: ESPNcricinfo, 18 October 2015

Paskuwal Handi Tharindu Kaushal (Sinhala: තරිදු කෞශාල්; born 5 March 1993) is a professional Sri Lankan cricketer who plays for ODIs and Tests in international level. He is a right-arm off break bowler who also bats right-handed. He is a past student of Devapathiraja College, Rathgama.

== Domestic career ==
He domestically plays for Nondescripts Cricket Club in domestic arena. He made his List A debut for the club in December 2012 against Colts Cricket Club. In October 2020, he was drafted by the Colombo Kings for the inaugural edition of the Lanka Premier League. In July 2022, he was signed by the Galle Gladiators for the third edition of the Lanka Premier League.

== International career ==
He made his Test match debut for Sri Lanka against New Zealand on 26 December 2014.

Kaushal made his One Day International debut for Sri Lanka against South Africa on 18 March 2015 in the quarter-finals of the 2015 Cricket World Cup. He got a chance as a replacement for the injured Rangana Herath.

Kaushal replaced injured Dilruwan Perera for the second test against Pakistan. He was a real headache for the Pakistani batsmen from the very first over and finally he took his first 5-wicket haul by taking 5 for 42 runs.

Kaushal's second five wicket haul came against India at Galle on 13 August 2015. Sri Lanka was in desperate trouble in the match, where their spearhead Rangana Herath along with Kaushal destroyed the India's second innings to just 112 runs. Herath took 7 wickets and Kaushal took rest of the 3 wickets. Sri Lanka finally won the match by 63 runs.

== Bowling action ==
Kaushal's bowling action has often been compared to that of legendary Sri Lankan spinner Muttiah Muralitharan. Like Muralitharan, Kaushal is considered a wrist spinner rather than a conventional off-spinner.

Following the Test series against India in 2015, his bowling action was reported for a suspected illegal action. The International Cricket Council (ICC) required him to undergo biomechanical testing in Chennai to determine whether his deliveries complied with the permitted 15-degree limit for elbow extension.

After the assessment, Sri Lanka's chairman of selectors Kapila Wijegunawardene stated that Kaushal's off-spin delivery was found to be legal. However, his doosra exceeded the ICC's 15-degree limit for elbow extension. As a result, Kaushal was permitted to continue bowling his off-spin but was banned from using the doosra in international cricket.
