= Viraj Pushpakumara =

Sri Lankan cricketer (born 1987)

Personal information
- Full name: Godahenage Viraj Pushpakumara
- Born: 18 May 1987 (age 39); Balapitiya, Sri Lanka
- Source: ESPNcricinfo, 3 December 2016

Viraj Pushpakumara (born 18 May 1987) is a Sri Lankan cricketer. He made his first-class debut for Colts Cricket Club in the 2010–11 Premier Trophy on 18 February 2011.
