= Lisula Lakshan =

Sri Lankan cricketer (born 1995)

Personal information
- Born: 13 September 1995 (age 31); Colombo, Sri Lanka
- Batting: Right-handed
- Role: Occasional wicketkeeper
- Source: Cricinfo, 4 April 2017

Lisula Lakshan (born 13 September 1995) is a Sri Lankan cricketer. He made his first-class debut for Burgher Recreation Club in the 2016–17 Premier League Tournament on 2 December 2016 and his List A debut for Batticaloa District in the 2016–17 Districts One Day Tournament on 15 March 2017. He made his Twenty20 debut for Burgher Recreation Club in the 2017–18 SLC Twenty20 Tournament on 25 February 2018.
