= Lahiru Fernando =

Sri Lankan cricketer (born 1994)

Personal information
- Full name: Mandadige Lahiru Sanjaya Madushan Parakrama Fernando
- Born: 11 January 1994 (age 32); Panadura, Sri Lanka
- Source: ESPNcricinfo, 3 December 2016

Lahiru Fernando (born 11 January 1994) is a Sri Lankan cricketer. He made his first-class debut for Bloomfield Cricket and Athletic Club in the 2016–17 Premier League Tournament on 3 December 2016. He made his List A debut for Anuradhaura District in the 2016–17 Districts One Day Tournament on 22 March 2017. He made his Twenty20 debut for Bloomfield Cricket and Athletic Club in the 2017–18 SLC Twenty20 Tournament on 24 February 2018.
