= Ruwan Chathuranga =

Sri Lankan cricketer (born 1989)

Personal information
- Full name: Jayasinghe Liyanarathnage Ruwan Chathuranga Vidyasekera
- Born: 13 May 1989 (age 37); Colombo, Sri Lanka
- Batting: Right-handed
- Bowling: Right-arm medium fast
- Source: ESPNcricinfo, 22 January 2017

Ruwan Chathuranga (born 13 May 1989) is a Sri Lankan cricketer. He made his first-class debut for Moors Sports Club in the 2016–17 Premier League Tournament on 20 January 2017. He made his List A debut for Nuwara Eliya District in the 2016–17 Districts One Day Tournament on 19 March 2017.
