= Pawan Wickramasinghe =

Sri Lankan cricketer (born 1994)

Personal information
- Born: 1 February 1994 (age 32); Colombo, Sri Lanka
- Source: ESPNcricinfo, 11 January 2017

Pawan Wickramasinghe (born 1 February 1994) is a Sri Lankan cricketer. He made his first-class debut for Nondescripts Cricket Club in the 2013–14 Premier Trophy on 31 January 2014.
