= Leo Fransisco =

Sri Lankan cricketer (born 1994)

Personal information
- Full name: Leo Kane Fransisco
- Born: 31 October 1994 (age 32); Kurunegala, Sri Lanka
- Source: Cricinfo, 22 December 2016

Leo Fransisco (born 31 October 1994) is a Sri Lankan cricketer. He made his first-class debut for Sri Lanka Army Sports Club in the 2013–14 Premier Trophy on 31 January 2014.
