= Colts Cricket Club Ground =

Cricket stadium in Sri Lanka

Ground information
- Location: Colombo, Sri Lanka
- Coordinates: 6°53′11″N 79°52′04″E
- Establishment: 1873
- Capacity: 10,000
- Owner: Colts Cricket Club
- Operator: Colts Cricket Club
- Tenants: Colts Cricket Club
- End names
- Havelock Park End; Pavilion End

International information
- Only women's Test: 17-21 April 1998: Sri Lanka v Pakistan
- First WODI: 10 November 2005: Sri Lanka v England
- Last WODI: 26 April 2011: Ireland v Netherlands
- First WT20I: 24 April 2011: Ireland v Pakistan
- Last WT20I: 22 September 2018: Sri Lanka v India

Team information
Colts Cricket Club	(1873–present)
- As of 3 September 2020; Source: Colombo Colts Cricket Club

Colts Cricket Club Ground is a cricket ground on Park Road in Havelock Town, Colombo, Sri Lanka, in the south-east corner of Havelock Park. It has been the home of Colts Cricket Club since 1971.

The ground is a regular venue for first-class and List A cricket matches and has also hosted many women's cricket matches. It has also hosted some Youth Tests and ODIs. As of late December 2016 it had hosted 188 first-class matches.
