= Nilanka Sandakan =

Sri Lankan cricketer (born 1996)

Personal information
- Full name: Nilanka Sandakan Pathirana
- Born: 9 June 1996 (age 30); Colombo, Sri Lanka
- Batting: Right-handed
- Bowling: Slow left-arm Orthodox
- Role: Allrounder
- Source: ESPNcricinfo, 15 December 2016

Nilanka Sandakan (born 9 June 1996) is a Sri Lankan cricketer. He made his first-class debut for Moors Sports Club in the 2016–17 Premier League Tournament on 15 December 2016. He made his List A debut for Nuwara Eliya District in the 2016–17 Districts One Day Tournament on 15 March 2017. He made his Twenty20 debut for Moors Sports Club in the 2017–18 SLC Twenty20 Tournament on 24 February 2018.
