= Harsha Cooray =

Sri Lankan cricketer (born 1983)

Personal information
- Full name: Nawalage Harsha Gihan Cooray
- Born: 23 November 1983 (age 42); Colombo, Sri Lanka
- Batting: Right-handed
- Bowling: Right-arm off break
- Source: ESPNcricinfo, 4 December 2016

Harsha Cooray (born 23 November 1983) is a Sri Lankan cricketer. He made his first-class debut for Saracens Sports Club in the 2005–06 Premier Trophy on 16 December 2005.

== See also ==
- List of Chilaw Marians Cricket Club players
