= Sithara Gimhan =

Sri Lankan cricketer (born 1996)

Sithara Gimhan.
Personal information
- Born: 1 February 1996 (age 30); Galle, Sri Lanka. Wife Name. = Dinushi Gamage
- Source: ESPNcricinfo, 10 December 2016

Sithara Gimhan (born 1 February 1996) is a Sri Lankan cricketer. He made his first-class debut for Tamil Union Cricket and Athletic Club in the 2015–16 Premier League Tournament on 2 January 2016. He made his List A debut for Jaffna District in the 2016–17 Districts One Day Tournament on 15 March 2017.
