= Minhaj Jalill =

Sri Lankan cricketer (born 1995)

Personal information
- Full name: Mohamed Minhaj Jalill
- Born: 9 January 1995 (age 31); Colombo, Sri Lanka
- Source: ESPNcricinfo, 16 January 2017

Minhaj Jalill (born 9 January 1995) is a Sri Lankan cricketer. He made his first-class debut for Tamil Union Cricket and Athletic Club in the 2014–15 Premier Trophy on 19 March 2015. He made his Twenty20 debut for Saracens Sports Club in the 2017–18 SLC Twenty20 Tournament on 24 February 2018.
