= Raminda Wijesooriya =

Sri Lankan cricketer (born 1998)

Personal information
- Full name: Wijesooriya Arachchige Raminda Pravinath
- Born: 18 March 1998 (age 28); Matara, Southern Province, Sri Lanka
- Source: CricInfo, 13 January 2019

Wijesooriya Arachchige Raminda Pravinath (born 18 March 1998), known as Raminda Wijesooriya, is a Sri Lankan cricketer. He made his Twenty20 debut for Burgher Recreation Club in the 2017–18 SLC Twenty20 Tournament on 24 February 2018. He made his List A debut for Burgher Recreation Club in the 2017–18 Premier Limited Overs Tournament on 10 March 2018. He made his first-class debut for Burgher Recreation Club in the 2017–18 Premier League Tournament on 11 January 2019.
