= Adeesha Nanayakkara =

Sri Lankan cricketer (born 1991)

Personal information
- Born: 2 May 1991 (age 35); Colombo, Sri Lanka
- Source: ESPNcricinfo, 3 January 2017

Adeesha Nanayakkara (born 2 May 1991) is a Sri Lankan cricketer. He made his first-class debut for Bloomfield Cricket and Athletic Club in the 2013–14 Premier Trophy on 17 January 2014. Adeesha was educated at Nalanda College, Colombo.

In April 2018, he was named in Kandy's squad for the 2018 Super Provincial One Day Tournament. He was the leading run-scorer for Sri Lanka Ports Authority Cricket Club in the 2018–19 Premier League Tournament, with 650 runs in nine matches.
