= Pramud Hettiwatte =

Sri Lankan cricketer (born 1995)

Personal information
- Born: 12 May 1995 (age 31); Colombo, Sri Lanka
- Source: ESPNcricinfo, 2 December 2016

Pramud Hettiwatte (born 15 May 1995) is a Sri Lankan cricketer. He made his first-class debut for Badureliya Sports Club in the 2016–17 Premier League Tournament on 2 December 2016.

Pramud was educated at Nalanda College, Colombo.
