= Akshu Fernando =

Sri Lankan cricketer (1991–2025)

Merennage Akshu Prihan Fernando (11 March 1991 – 30 December 2025) was a Sri Lankan cricketer. He was a right-handed batsman and right-arm off-break bowler who played for Panadura Sports Club. He was born in Panadura.

== Career ==
Fernando made his cricketing debut in the 2008 Under-23 Tournament for Panadura, and also played in the 2009 competition.

Fernando's List A debut came in the 2009–10 Premier Limited Overs Tournament competition, against Sri Lanka Air Force, scoring 5 runs. He featured in 39 first-class cricket matches representing Panadura and Ragama CC.

== Accident ==
On 28 December 2018, Akshu Fernando was critically injured and was admitted to the hospital after being hit by a train following training session with his teammates at Mount Lavinia. The incident happened when he attempted to cross the railway track from the opposite direction after the first train passed by on the parallel track.

== Death ==
Fernando died on 30 December 2025 at the age of 34.

== See also ==
- List of Chilaw Marians Cricket Club players
