= Nilushan Nonis =

Sri Lankan cricketer (born 1987)

Personal information
- Full name: Paththini Kuttige Jude Ruwantha Nilushan Nonis
- Born: 3 September 1987 (age 39); Colombo, Sri Lanka
- Batting: Right-handed
- Bowling: Right-arm fast-medium/off break
- Source: ESPNcricinfo, 10 December 2016

Nilushan Nonis (born 3 September 1987) is a Sri Lankan cricketer. He made his List A debut for Ragama Cricket Club in the 2007–08 Premier Limited Overs Tournament on 9 December 2007. He made his first-class debut for Ragama Cricket Club in the 2007–08 Premier Trophy on 17 January 2008.
