= Tharuka Raveen =

Sri Lankan cricketer (born 1997)

Personal information
- Born: 7 April 1997 (age 29); Colombo, Sri Lanka
- Source: ESPNcricinfo, 15 December 2016

Tharuka Raveen (born 7 April 1997) is a Sri Lankan cricketer. He made his first-class debut for Tamil Union Cricket and Athletic Club in the 2016–17 Premier League Tournament on 15 December 2016.
