= Ravindu Tillakaratne =

Sri Lankan cricketer (born 1996)

Personal information
- Full name: Ravindu Sachin Tillakaratne
- Born: 9 September 1996 (age 30); Colombo, Sri Lanka
- Batting: Left-handed
- Bowling: Slow left-arm wrist-spin
- Role: All-rounder
- Relatives: Hashan Tillakaratne (father); Duvindu Tillakaratne (twin brother)
- Source: ESPNcricinfo, 12 January 2017

Ravindu Tillakaratne (born 9 September 1996) is a Sri Lankan cricketer. He made his first-class debut for Nondescripts Cricket Club in the 2016–17 Premier League Tournament on 11 January 2017. He made his Twenty20 debut for Kalutara Town Club in the 2017–18 SLC Twenty20 Tournament on 1 March 2018. He made his List A debut for Kalutara Town Club in the 2017–18 Premier Limited Overs Tournament on 12 March 2018.

He is the son of Test cricketer and former Test captain for Sri Lanka Hashan Tillakaratne, and the twin brother of Duvindu Tillakaratne.
