= Lahiru Weragala =

Sri Lankan cricketer (born 1989)

Lahiru Weragala (born 12 March 1989) is a Sri Lankan cricketer. He is a right-handed batsman and slow left-arm bowler who plays for Chilaw Marians. He was born in Colombo.

Weragala, who has two Youth Test appearances from a 2007 Indian tour of Sri Lanka, and who has appeared regularly for the Chilaw Marians Under-23 team since September 2007, made his List A debut during the 2009–10 season, against Sri Lanka Army.
