= Jayantha Paranathala =

Sri Lankan cricketer (1950–2023)

Personal information
- Full name: Dissanayake Mudiyanselage Mahasen Jayantha Paranathala
- Born: 24 November 1950; Pannipitiya, Ceylon
- Died: 26 September 2023 (aged 72)
- Nickname: Para
- Batting: Left-handed
- Role: Bowler
- Relatives: Indumathie Paranathala (Spouse) Tharindu Paranathala (Son) Aroshini Paranathala (Daughter)

Domestic team information
- Years: Team
- 1977-1990: Burgher Recreation Club

Career statistics
Competition	First-class
Matches	6
Runs scored	224
Batting average	32.00
100s/50s	00/1
Top score	85
Balls bowled
Wickets	6
Bowling average	21.16
5 wickets in innings	00
10 wickets in match	0
Best bowling	3/12
Catches/stumpings

Jayantha Paranathala (24 November 1950 – 26 September 2023) was a Sri Lankan cricketer and Deputy Inspector General of Police. He was also a vice president of Sri Lanka Cricket and a national cricket selector.

== Cricket career ==
Paranathala started playing cricket at Isipathana College, Colombo. As a schoolboy in 1977, he was selected to play against England B at Galle.

== Post-playing career ==
Paranathala had a long career in the Sri Lanka Police and retired with the rank of Deputy Inspector General of Police.

Paranathala served Sri Lanka Cricket in various capacities including Sri Lanka team manager, national selector, Sri Lanka Cricket Vice President, Chairman of the Umpires' Committee, Secretary of the National Development Committee.

From 1988, he was the President of cricket club Burgher Recreation Club. In September 2018, he was one of 49 former Sri Lankan cricketers honoured by Sri Lanka Cricket for their services before Sri Lanka became a full member of the International Cricket Council (ICC).

== Death ==
Jayantha Paranathala died on 26 September 2023, at the age of 72.
