= Navod Ilukwatta =

Sri Lankan cricketer (born 1991)

Personal information
- Born: 21 December 1991 (age 34); Colombo, Sri Lanka
- Source: ESPNcricinfo, 7 February 2017

Navod Ilukwatta (born 21 December 1991) is a Sri Lankan cricketer. He made his first-class debut for Sri Lanka Army Sports Club in the 2016–17 Premier League Tournament on 5 February 2017.
