= Ron Chandraguptha =

Sri Lankan cricketer (born 1995)

Personal information
- Full name: Ron Kashyapa Chandraguptha
- Born: 22 February 1995 (age 31); Peradeniya, Sri Lanka
- Batting: Left-handed
- Bowling: Left arm Wrist spin
- Role: Opening batsman

Domestic team information
- Years: Team
- Tamil Union Cricket and Athletic Club
- Source: ESPNcricinfo, 11 December 2016

Ron Chandraguptha (Peradeniya, Sri Lanka, born 22 February 1995) is a Sri Lankan cricketer. He made his first-class debut for Tamil Union Cricket and Athletic Club in the 2014–15 Premier Trophy on 30 January 2015. He was part of the Sri Lankan team which won the ACC Emerging Teams Asia Cup 2017. He made his Twenty20 debut on 8 January 2020, for Colombo Cricket Club in the 2019–20 SLC Twenty20 Tournament.
