= Rathgama =

Rathgama Rajgama
- Location in Sri Lanka
- Coordinates: 6°5′30″N 80°8′30″E
- Country: Sri Lanka
- Province: Southern Province
- District: Galle
- Divisional Secretariat: Rathgama

Area
  - Land: 1.252 km^{2} (0.483 sq mi)

Population (2024)
  - Total: 1,512
- Time zone: UTC+5:30 (Sri Lanka Standard Time)
- Postal Code: 80260

Rathgama (Sinhala: රත්ගම) is a small coastal town situated in Galle District, Southern Province of Sri Lanka. It is located about 120 km (75 mi) south of Colombo and 15 km (9.3 mi) north of Galle.

== Etymology ==
The village is also known 'Rajgama', which means kings village. The village was gifted by Parākramabāhu II to Minister Devapathiraja for his loyalty in the 12th century during the Dambadenyia period.

== Transport ==
=== Road ===
Located on the A2 highway (Colombo-Galle-Hambantota-Wellawaya) a part of the Colombo-Galle road.

=== Rail ===
Rathgama railway station is the 46th station on the Coastal Line and is located 105 km (65 mi) from Colombo fort railway station.

== Education ==
- Devapathiraja College
- Sir Ernest de Silva Vidyalaya
- Sirisumana Vidyalaya

== Landmarks ==
- Rathgama beach, known as a quieter, less developed alternative to Hikkaduwa. The most recognised surf break is Owakanda Surf Point, a left handed reef break.
- Rathgama Lake, a brackish lagoon separated from the sea by a narrow strip of land. The lagoon and the surrounding mangroves form a unique ecosystem with bird species including herons, kingfishers and cormorants.

== See also ==
- List of towns in Southern Province, Sri Lanka
