= Nalin Perera (cricketer) =

Sri Lankan cricketer (born 1994)

Personal information
- Full name: Amarathunga Arachchilage Nalin Perera
- Born: 21 January 1994 (age 32); Colombo, Sri Lanka
- Source: ESPNcricinfo, 16 January 2017

Nalin Perera (born 21 January 1994) is a Sri Lankan cricketer. He made his first-class debut for Galle Cricket Club in the 2016–17 Premier League Tournament on 13 January 2017. He made his List A debut for Galle District in the 2016–17 Districts One Day Tournament on 22 March 2017.
