= Dilan Jayalath =

Sri Lankan cricketer (born 1997)

Personal information
- Born: 27 January 1997 (age 29); Wariyapola, Sri Lanka
- Source: ESPNcricinfo, 15 December 2016

Dilan Jayalath (born 27 January 1997) is a Sri Lankan cricketer. He made his first-class debut for Sinhalese Sports Club in the 2016–17 Premier League Tournament on 15 December 2016. He made his Twenty20 debut for Sinhalese Sports Club in the 2017–18 SLC Twenty20 Tournament on 1 March 2018. He made his List A debut for Sinhalese Sports Club in the 2017–18 Premier Limited Overs Tournament on 12 March 2018.
