= Sahan Nanayakkare =

Sri Lankan cricketer (born 1995)

Personal information
- Born: 19 August 1995 (age 31); Colombo, Sri Lanka
- Source: ESPNcricinfo, 11 December 2016

Sahan Nanayakkare (born 19 August 1995) is a Sri Lankan cricketer. He made his first-class debut for Ragama Cricket Club in the 2014–15 Premier Trophy on 13 March 2015.
