= Nisal Francisco =

Sri Lankan cricketer (born 1997)

Personal information
- Born: 1 July 1997 (age 29); Colombo, Sri Lanka
- Batting: Left-handed
- Bowling: Legbreak
- Source: ESPNcricinfo, 3 December 2016

Nisal Francisco (born 1 July 1997) is a Sri Lankan cricketer. He made his first-class debut for Bloomfield Cricket and Athletic Club in the 2016–17 Premier League Tournament on 3 December 2016. He made his List A debut for Anuradhaura District in the 2016–17 Districts One Day Tournament on 15 March 2017.

In April 2018, he was named in Colombo's squad for the 2018 Super Provincial One Day Tournament. He made his Twenty20 debut on 4 January 2020, for Burgher Recreation Club in the 2019–20 SLC Twenty20 Tournament.
