= Ruwan Herath =

Sri Lankan cricketer (born 1984)

Personal information
- Full name: Herath Mudiyanselage Chaminda Ruwan Kumara Herath
- Born: 5 August 1984 (age 42); Kurunegala, Sri Lanka
- Source: ESPNcricinfo, 8 January 2017

Ruwan Herath (born 5 August 1984) is a Sri Lankan cricketer. He made his first-class debut for Galle Cricket Club in the 2016–17 Premier League Tournament on 6 January 2017. He made his List A debut for Galle District in the 2016–17 Districts One Day Tournament on 26 March 2017.
