= Devapathiraja College =

- දේවපතිරාජ විද්‍යාලය

Location
- Rathgama, Galle; Galle, Southern, 80260; Sri Lanka
- Coordinates: 6.1030079°N 80.1486151°E

Information
- Type: National
- Motto: "විජ්ජා උපපතතං සෙට්ඨා"; Vidya Upapaththan setta
- Established: 1920
- Founder: Sir Ernest de Silva
- School district: Galle
- Principal: Mr. Sam De Silva
- Grades: Classes 6 – 13
- Gender: Boys and Girls
- Age range: 12 to 19
- Enrollment: 2200
- Affiliation: Buddhist

Devapathiraja College is a Sri Lankan educational establishment situated in the coastal town of Rathgama. It is the first free Buddhist English school in the Galle district under the Southern province. It was founded in 1920 by Philanthropist Sir Albert Ernest de Silva. It was severely damaged by a tsunami on December 26, 2004 and was relocated to the country further inland, 1.5 km away from the coastline. The institution underwent major renovations and formally reopened on May 5, 2008.

There are currently 2007 students (1051 males and 956 females) in Devapathiraja College.
