= Mohamed Shiraz =

Sri Lankan cricketer (born 1995)

Personal information
- Full name: Katupulle Gedara Mohamed Shiraz Sahab
- Born: 13 February 1995 (age 31); Kandy, Sri Lanka
- Batting: Right-handed
- Bowling: Right-arm medium fast
- Role: Bowler

International information
- National side: Sri Lanka
- ODI debut (cap 213): 2 August 2024 v India
- Last ODI: 19 November 2024 v New Zealand

Domestic team information
- Years: Team
- 2016–2023: Colts Cricket Club
- 2024–present: Burgher Recreation Club

Career statistics
Competition	ODI	FC	LA	T20
Matches	2	54	54	23
Runs scored	1	397	113	34
Batting average	–	10.44	8.07	11.33
100s/50s	0/0	0/1	0/0	0/0
Top score	1*	65	27*	10
Balls bowled	54	7151	2061	378
Wickets	1	145	85	23
Bowling average	48.00	29.91	29.91	19.00
5 wickets in innings	0	8	3	0
10 wickets in match	0	0	0	0
Best bowling	1/23	6/86	6/21	3/10
Catches/stumpings	0/–	20/–	13/–	6/–
- Source: ESPNcricinfo, 5 February 2025

Katupulle Gedara Mohamed Shiraz Sahab (born 13 February 1995), better known as Mohamed Shiraz is a professional Sri Lankan cricketer. He played his first international match against SL vs IND 1st ODI, which took place in August 2024. He made his first-class debut for Colts Cricket Club in the 2016–17 Premier League Tournament on 29 November 2016. He made his List A debut for Kegalle District in the 2016–17 Districts One Day Tournament on 19 March 2017.

In February 2019, he was named in Sri Lanka's Test squad for their series against South Africa, but he did not play. In March 2019, he was named in Colombo's squad for the 2019 Super Provincial One Day Tournament. In October 2020, he was drafted by the Galle Gladiators for the inaugural edition of the Lanka Premier League. In August 2021, he was named in the SLC Reds team for the 2021 SLC Invitational T20 League tournament. However, prior to the first match, he tested positive for COVID-19, ruling him out of the tournament.

In June 2022, he was named in the Sri Lanka A squad for their matches against Australia A during Australia's tour of Sri Lanka.
