= Roshan Jayatissa =

Sri Lankan cricketer (born 1989)

Personal information
- Full name: Doolwela Kandegedara Roshan Chanaka Jayatissa
- Born: 5 June 1989 (age 37); Kandy, Sri Lanka
- Batting: Right-handed
- Bowling: Right-arm off break
- Source: ESPNcricinfo, 19 July 2020

Doolwala Kandiyagedera Roshan Chanaka Jayatissa (born 5 June 1989) is a Sri Lankan cricketer. He is a right-handed batsman and right-arm off-break bowler who plays for Sri Lanka Army Sports Club. He was born in Kandy.

Jayatissa made his first-class debut for the side during the 2009-10 Premier Championship, against Chilaw Marians. From the lower order, he scored 4 not out in a drawn match.
