= Dinuk Wikramanayaka =

Sri Lankan cricketer (born 1994)

Personal information
- Full name: Dinuk Melantha Wickramanayaka
- Born: 15 May 1994 (age 32); Kandy, Sri Lanka
- Source: ESPNcricinfo, 4 December 2016

Dinuk Wikramanayaka (born 15 May 1994) is a Sri Lankan cricketer. He made his first-class debut for Panadura Sports Club in the 2013–14 Premier Trophy on 17 January 2014.
