= Duvindu Tillakaratne =

Sri Lankan cricketer

Duvindu Sachin Tillakaratne
Personal information
- Full name: Duvindu Sachin Tillakaratne
- Born: 9 September 1996 (age 30); Colombo, Sri Lanka
- Batting: Right-handed
- Bowling: Left-arm spin
- Role: All-rounder
- Relatives: Hashan Tillakaratne (father); Ravindu Tillakaratne (twin brother)
Medal record
Representing Sri Lanka
Men's Cricket
South Asian Games
Silver medal – second place	2019 Kathmandu/Pokhara	Team
- Source: Cricinfo, 9 December 2016

Duvindu Tillakaratne (born 9 September 1996) is a Sri Lankan cricketer. He is the son of Sri Lankan Test cricketer Hashan Tillakaratne, and the twin brother of Ravindu Tillakaratne.

He made his first-class debut for Badureliya Sports Club in the 2016–17 Premier League Tournament on 9 December 2016. He made his List A debut for Ampara District in the 2016–17 Districts One Day Tournament on 15 March 2017.

He was the leading wicket-taker for Burgher Recreation Club in the 2018–19 Premier League Tournament, with 34 dismissals in nine matches. In November 2019, he was named in Sri Lanka's squad for the men's cricket tournament at the 2019 South Asian Games. The Sri Lanka team won the silver medal, after they lost to Bangladesh by seven wickets in the final. He was the leading wicket-taker in the 2019–20 Premier League Tournament, with 61 dismissals in nine matches.

In October 2020, he was drafted by the Galle Gladiators for the inaugural edition of the Lanka Premier League.

He was the leading wicket-taker in the 2022–23 Major Clubs Limited Over Tournament with 36 wickets in 12 matches.

He is a recipient of the "Trinity Lion", which he earned by surpassing the 100 wicket mark in his final season for Trinity College, Kandy.

Playing for Chilaw Marians CC in the 2024/25 Major club 3-day tournament, he took 39 wickets in 8 matches while achieving the best bowling average and strike rate of the tournament.
