= Sajeewa Weerakoon =

Sri Lankan cricketer

Personal information
- Full name: Sajeewa Weerakoon
- Born: 17 February 1978 (age 48); Galle, Sri Lanka
- Height: 6 ft 0 in (1.83 m)
- Batting: Left-handed
- Bowling: Slow left-arm orthodox
- Role: Bowler

International information
- National side: Sri Lanka
- ODI debut (cap 151): 13 June 2012 v Pakistan
- Last ODI: 16 June 2012 v Pakistan

Domestic team information
- Years: Team
- Burgher Recreation Club
- Colts
- Galle Cricket Club
- Tamil Union

Career statistics
Competition	ODI	FC	LA	T20
Matches	2	161	134	29
Runs scored	–	2,002	437	97
Batting average	–	14.94	12.85	10.77
100s/50s	–	0/4	0/1	0/0
Top score	–	90	53*	28
Balls bowled	60	31,716	5,951	543
Wickets	1	693	176	36
Bowling average	49.00	20.46	21.16	14.22
5 wickets in innings	0	43	2	0
10 wickets in match	0	12	0	0
Best bowling	1/49	7/40	5/24	3/14
Catches/stumpings	0/–	97/–	50/–	8/–
- Source: Cricinfo, 29 December 2012

Sajeewa Weerakoon (born 17 February 1978), is a former Sri Lankan One Day International cricketer. He is a slow left-arm orthodox bowler.

== Domestic career ==
He has played for Burgher Recreation Club and Galle Cricket Club in domestic cricket. He made his Twenty20 debut on 17 August 2004, for Burgher Recreation Club in the 2004 SLC Twenty20 Tournament.

After consistently performing for Sri Lanka A he was included in the national squad to tour India in 2005. Although he didn't play a Test it was recognition for a wonderful season which included 60 wickets for Sri Lanka A in just seven First-class matches. Before his selection in the Sri Lankan squad he had won the best bowler award twice in domestic cricket, topping 50 wickets on both occasions in the Premier league. A left-arm orthodox spin bowler, Weerakoon has taken over 800 wickets in first-class cricket.

Sajeewa played as club professional for Wood Lane CC of the North Staffs & South Cheshire Premier League in 2007 when he finished as joint leading wicket taker in the League.

== International career ==
Though he has good record in domestic arena, he could not prove his worthiness to international team. He made his ODI debut against Pakistan in 2012 at Colombo.
