= Havelock Park =

Stadium in Colombo, Sri Lanka

- හැව්ලොක් පාර්ක් ஹேவ்லாக் பூங்கா
- Location within Colombo Municipality
- Location: Havelock Town, Colombo, Sri Lanka
- Coordinates: 6°53′14″N 79°52′00″E
- Capacity: 5,000
- Type: Sporting complex
- Events: Sporting Events, Concert
- Surface: Grass

Construction
- Opened: 1901

Tenants
- Havelock SC (Rugby); Colts Cricket Club (Cricket); Burgher Recreation Club

Havelock Park (Sinhala: හැව්ලොක් පාර්ක්, Tamil: ஹேவ்லாக் பூங்கா) is a multi-purpose stadium in Havelock Town, Colombo, Sri Lanka. It is one of the oldest grounds in the country. The sporting complex is located in Havelock Town and is bordered by Havelock Road, Park Road and Isipathana Mawatha.

== Early history ==
Havelock Park was established in 1901 to honour Sir Arthur Elibank Havelock (1844–1908), who was the 17th British Governor of Ceylon (1890–1895), by the Colombo Municipal Council (CMC). Havelock Park was originally 1.82 ha (4.5 acres) in area but in 1905 the CMC purchased an additional 2.41 ha (6.0 acres) for Rs 30,000. By 1907 Galle Face Green, Victoria Park (now known as Viharamahadevi Park) and the Havelock Town Park were adjudged as being the major "green lungs" of Colombo.

== Sports ==
During the early decades of the 19th century, Havelock Park became the home of several sporting clubs, although one, the Havelock Golf Club, shifted to Buller's Road (Bauddhaloka Mawatha) where the Bandaranaike Memorial International Conference Hall now stands. At the northern end of Havelock Park is the public area named after the national hero, Captain Duenuge Edward Henry Pedris (1888–1915), who was executed by British officials for alleged incitement of racial riots in 1915, which were later proven false.

Adjacent to Pedris Park, is one of Sri Lanka's oldest rugby clubs, the Havelock Sports Club, which was established in 1915. On 12 September 1907 the first international rugby union match played in Ceylon was held at Havelock Park between the New Zealand All Blacks and an All Ceylon team. The grounds were renovated in July 2012 to celebrate the club's 97th anniversary.

The Burgher Recreation Club (BRC) is also located on Havelock Park. The club originally known as the Bambalapitiya Sports Club was established in 1896 and in 1901 changed to Burgher Recreation Club when the club house was relocated to Havelock Park.

In the south-east corner is Colts Cricket Club Ground, the home of Colts Cricket Club since 1971. The ground is a regular venue for first-class matches and also hosted many women's cricket matches. The Colts Cricket Club is a first-class cricket team that has won the Sri Lanka domestic league six times, the latest being the 2011–12 season.

A children's playground was constructed in the south-west corner of the park in 1959.

== Concert ==
Romanian singer Inna performed at Havelock Park on 13 September 2015 in Sun FM concert SUNFEST 2015.

Jamaican singer Sean Paul performed at Havelock park on 28 November 2015 in Sun FM concert SUNFEST 2015.

American singer Jason Derulo performed at Havlock park on 8 April 2016
