= Lasith Lakshan =

Sri Lankan cricketer (born 1996)

Personal information
- Born: 1 February 1996 (age 30); Matara, Sri Lanka
- Source: ESPNcricinfo, 21 December 2016

Lasith Lakshan (born 1 February 1996) is a Sri Lankan cricketer. He made his first-class debut for Sri Lanka Ports Authority Cricket Club in the 2015–16 Premier League Tournament on 4 December 2015. He was signed by Accrington Cricket Club to play for the team during the 2021 summer in England.
