= Hashen Ramanayake =

Sri Lankan cricketer (born 1995)

Personal information
- Born: 18 April 1995 (age 31); Colombo, Sri Lanka
- Batting: Right-handed
- Source: ESPNcricinfo

Hashen Ramanayake (born 18 April 1995) is a Sri Lankan first-class cricketer. He was part of Sri Lanka's squad for the 2014 ICC Under-19 Cricket World Cup.

During the 2015 English cricket season, Ramanayake played for Highgate Cricket Club in the Middlesex County Cricket League. He had a prolific season with both bat and ball, helping Highgate achieve promotion to MCCL Division 2.
