= Sachithra Perera =

Sri Lankan cricketer (born 1992)

Personal information
- Born: 31 March 1992 (age 34); Colombo, Sri Lanka
- Batting: Right-handed
- Bowling: Legbreak
- Source: ESPNcricinfo, 2 December 2016

Sachithra Perera (born 31 March 1992) is a Sri Lankan cricketer. He made his first-class debut for Lankan Cricket Club against Ragama Cricket Club in the 2011–12 Premier Trophy on 20 January 2012.
