= Shanuka Dulaj =

Sri Lankan cricketer (born 1995)

Personal information
- Full name: Shanuka Dulaj Withanawasam
- Born: 4 March 1995 (age 31); Colombo, Sri Lanka
- Source: ESPNcricinfo, 15 December 2016

Shanuka Dulaj (born 4 March 1995) is a Sri Lankan cricketer. He made his first-class debut for Moors Sports Club in the 2014–15 Premier Trophy on 23 January 2015.
