= Bloomfield Cricket and Athletic Club =

Sri Lankan cricket team

Personnel
- Captain: (Sri Lanka) Nipun Karunanayake
- Coach: (Sri Lanka) Taranga Dhammika

Team information
- Colours: Emerald Green
- Founded: 1892
- Home ground: BCAC Ground

History
- Premier Trophy wins: 8
- Premier Limited Overs Tournament wins: 5
- Twenty20 Tournament wins: none

Bloomfield Cricket and Athletic Club is a first-class cricket team based in Colombo, Sri Lanka. It is one of Sri Lanka's oldest cricket clubs founded in 1892 and competes in the Premier Trophy, which it has won eight times. Its ground, the Bloomfield Cricket and Athletic Club Ground, is in the Cinnamon Gardens district of Colombo, on Reid Avenue, opposite Royal College.

== History ==
The club was founded in 1892. It played its first first-class match in December 1994. At the start of February 2025, it has played 283 first-class matches, with 94 wins, 40 losses, 148 draws and one tie.

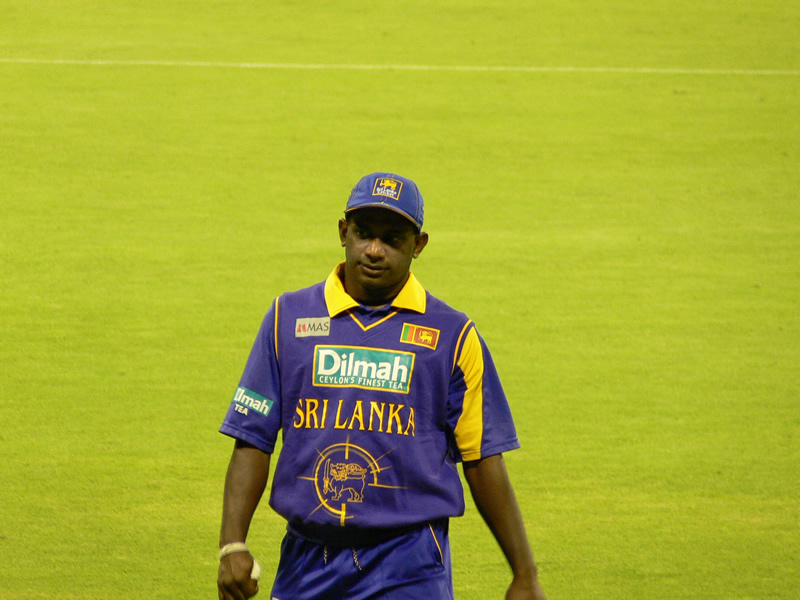
Sanath Jayasuriya began playing for BC&AC in the 1994/95 season

== Current squad ==
The club's players who have played for the Sri Lanka national cricket team are listed in bold.

No	Name	Nat	Age	Batting style	Bowling style
Batsmen
1	Lahiru Jayakody	(Sri Lanka)	31	Right-handed	Right-arm medium-fast
6	Nipun Karunanayake (Captain)	(Sri Lanka)	34	Left-handed	Right-arm leg-break
7	Adeesha Nanayakkara	(Sri Lanka)	34	Right-handed	Right-arm medium-fast
–	Chandimanthu Rodrigo	(Sri Lanka)	35	Right-handed	Right-arm off-break
–	Kasun Ekanayake	(Sri Lanka)	28	Right-handed	–
–	Sachin Jayawardena	(Sri Lanka)	31	Right-handed	Slow left-arm orthodox
–	Nisal Francisco	(Sri Lanka)	28	Left-handed	Right-arm leg-break
All-rounders
5	Ramesh Mendis	(Sri Lanka)	30	Right-handed	Right-arm off-break
11	Anuk Fernando	(Sri Lanka)	30	Left-handed	Left-arm medium-fast
17	Pramud Hettiwatte	(Sri Lanka)	30	Left-handed	Slow left-arm orthodox
Wicket-keepers
2	Nipun Haggalla	(Sri Lanka)	28	Right-handed	–
–	Thiran Dhanapala	(Sri Lanka)	29	Right-handed	–
Bowlers
10	Imran Khan	(Sri Lanka)	33	Left-handed	Right-arm fast-medium
36	Lahiru Fernando	(Sri Lanka)	31	Right-handed	Right-arm leg-break
65	**Kasun Rajitha**	(Sri Lanka)	32	Right-handed	Right-arm medium-fast
73	Lahiru Samarakoon	(Sri Lanka)	28	Left-handed	Left-arm fast-medium
–	Malith de Silva	(Sri Lanka)	30	Right-handed	Slow left-arm orthodox
–	Koshan Dhanushka	(Sri Lanka)	32	Right-handed	Right-arm off-break

== Honours ==
- P Saravanamuttu Trophy (3)

1963–64 1994–95 1996–97

- Robert Senanayake Trophy (2)

1980–81 1981–82

- Lakspray Trophy (1)

1982–83

- Premier Trophy (2)

1998–99 2003–04

- Bristol Trophy Under 25 (2)

1983 1984

== Club Presidents ==
- Shelley Wickramasinghe (1972–73)
- Shelley Wickramasinghe (1976–77)
- Shelley Wickramasinghe (1979 to 2000)
