= Nuwan =

Nuwan (Sinhala: නුවන්) is a Sinhalese masculine given name. It may refer to the following notable Sri Lankan cricketers:

- Nuwan Chamara (born 1983)
- Nuwan Ekanayake (born 1980)
- Nuwan Indika (born 1985)
- Nuwan Jayawardene (born 1978)
- Nuwan Karunaratne (born 1994)
- Nuwan Kavinda (born 1992)
- Nuwan Kulasekara (born 1982)
- Nuwan Liyanapathirana (born 1987)
- Nuwan Pradeep (born 1986)
- Nuwan Priyadarshana (born 1993)
- Nuwan Priyankara (born 1976)
- Nuwan Sameera (born 1985)
- Nuwan Sampath (born 1996)
- Nuwan Sanjeewa (born 1978)
- Nuwan Thushara (born 1994)
- Nuwan Zoysa (born 1978)
