= Niaz =

Niaz, NIAZ, Niyas or Neyaz may refer to:

== Given name ==
=== Niaz ===
- Niaz Ahmed, multiple people
- Niaz Ahmad Akhtar (born 1960), Pakistani academic
- Niaz Alam, British-Bangladeshi investment consultant and journalist
- Niaz Ali, Pakistani footballer
- Niaz Ahmad Chaudhry (born 1949), Pakistani scientist
- Niaz Mohammad Chowdhury (born 1952), Bangladeshi singer
- Niaz Diasamidze (born 1973), Georgian musician
- Niaz Fatehpuri (1884–1966), Pakistani Urdu poet
- Niaz Gul (died 2021), Pakistani footballer
- Niaz Ahmed Jhakkar (1954–2026), Pakistani politician
- Niaz Khan (born 1970), British-Pakistani former terrorist
- Niaz Khan (cricketer) (born 2001), Pakistani cricketer
- Niaz Khan (field hockey) (1917–2001), Pakistani field hockey player
- Niaz Ahmed Khan (born 1964), Bangladeshi academic
- Niaz Ali Khan (1880–1976), Pakistani civil engineer, agriculturalist, and philanthropist
- Niaz Hussain Khan, Pakistani politician
- Niaz Mohammad Khan (1907–1972), Chief Commissioner of the Pakistan Boy Scouts Association
- Niaz Morshed (Dhaka cricketer) (born 1983), Bangladeshi cricketer
- Niaz Amir Muqam, Pakistani politician
- Niaz Murshed (born 1966), Bangladeshi chess player
- Niaz Morshed (Dhaka cricketer) (born 1983), Bangladeshi cricketer
- Niaz Naik (1926–2009), Pakistani diplomat
- Niaz Ali Naji (born 1946), Pakistani footballer
- Niaz Zaman (born 1941), Bangladeshi academic

=== Niyas ===
- Niyas Backer, Indian actor
- Niyasdeen Ramathullah (born 1993), Sri Lankan cricketer

== Places ==
- Arbab Niaz Stadium, a Test cricket ground in Peshawar, North West Frontier Province, Pakistan
- Niaz Stadium, a cricket ground in Hyderabad, Pakistan
- Niaz, Ardabil, a village in Ardabil Province, Iran
- Niaz Sui, a village in Ardabil Province, Iran
- Niaz, East Azerbaijan, a village in East Azerbaijan Province, Iran
- Niaz, Kurdistan, a village in Kurdistan Province, Iran
- Niazabad, Lorestan, a village in Lorestan Province, Iran
- Niaz, West Azerbaijan, a village in West Azerbaijan Province, Iran
- Qalʽeh-ye Niaz, a village in Badghis Province in north western Afghanistan
