= 2017–18 SLC Twenty20 Tournament =

Cricket tournament

- Dates: 24 February 2018 – 8 March 2018
- Administrator: Sri Lanka Cricket
- Cricket format: Twenty20
- Tournament format: Round-robin then knockout
- Champions: Nondescripts Cricket Club
- Player of the series: Chaturanga de Silva
- Most runs: Ruvindu Gunasekera (272)
- Most wickets: Lasith Malinga (17); Chaturanga de Silva (17)

The 2017–18 SLC Twenty20 Tournament was a Twenty20 cricket tournament that was held in Sri Lanka. It was played between domestic teams in Sri Lanka, with the tournament starting on 24 February 2018 and concluding on 8 March 2018. The matches were used as preparation for the 2018 Nidahas Trophy.

Following the conclusion of the group stage, Colombo Cricket Club, Tamil Union Cricket and Athletic Club, Sri Lanka Army Sports Club and Nondescripts Cricket Club progressed to the quarterfinals. Nondescripts Cricket Club won the tournament, after they beat Colombo Cricket Club by six runs in the final.

In February 2019, Sri Lanka Cricket named Ruvindu Gunasekara as the tournament's Best Batsman, Lasith Malinga as the Best Bowler and Chaturanga de Silva as the Player of the Tournament.

== Fixtures ==
=== Group stage ===
==== Group A ====
24 February 2018
Scorecard

Saracens Sports Club; 148 (20 overs)	v	Colombo Cricket Club; 149/4 (18.4 overs)
Ruvindu Gunasekera 56 (43); Sachith Pathirana 2/25 (4 overs)		Dilshan Munaweera 75* (63); Andy Solomons 2/22 (4 overs)

Colombo Cricket Club won by 6 wickets
Bloomfield Cricket and Athletic Club Ground, Colombo
Umpires: Ranganath Prasanna and Kamal Indrajith

- Colombo Cricket Club won the toss and elected to field.
- Minhaj Jalill, Mishen Silva (Saracens Sports Club) and Manelker De Silva (Colombo Cricket Club) all made their T20 debuts.

24 February 2018
Scorecard

Sri Lanka Army Sports Club; 218 (19.5 overs)	v	Negombo Cricket Club; 116 (16.3 overs)
Ashan Randika 72 (36); Sehan Weerasinghe 4/33 (4 overs)		Prasansana Jayamanna 27 (19); Janith Silva 4/22 (4 overs)

Sri Lanka Army Sports Club won by 102 runs
Navy Ground, Welisara
Umpires: Kapil Kottahachchi and Palitha de Alwis

- Negombo Cricket Club won the toss and elected to field.
- Ashan Randika, Himasha Liyanage, Kasun de Silva (Sri Lanka Army Sports Club), Charles Fernando, Lasith Croospulle, Prasansana Jayamanna, Sachin Dalpethado, Sehan Weerasinghe, Dilasri Lokubandara, Umega Chaturanga and Roshen Fernando (Negombo Cricket Club) all made their T20 debuts.

24 February 2018
Scorecard

Panadura Sports Club; 74 (16.1 overs)	v	Bloomfield Cricket and Athletic Club; 78/0 (8.2 overs)
Kashif Naved 14 (21); Lahiru Samarakoon 2/5 (1.1 overs)		Nipun Karunanayake 47* (27)

Bloomfield Cricket and Athletic Club won by 10 wickets
Navy Ground, Welisara
Umpires: Hemantha Boteju and Rohitha Kottahachchi

- Panadura Sports Club won the toss and elected to bat.
- Nipun Haggalla, Lahiru Jayakody, Lahiru Samarakoon, Lahiru Fernando (Bloomfield Cricket and Athletic Club), Vishva Chathuranga, Dimantha Fernando, Pubudu Hasanka, Ashen Kavinda, Suresh Peiris, Tharindu Maduranga and Nishan Perera (Panadura Sports Club) all made their T20 debuts.

25 February 2018
Scorecard

Colombo Cricket Club; 200 (20 overs)	v	Bloomfield Cricket and Athletic Club; 177/9 (20 overs)
Dilshan Munaweera 43 (29); Imran Khan 4/35 (4 overs)		Adeesha Nanayakkara 48 (40); Lakshan Sandakan 4/18 (4 overs)

Colombo Cricket Club won by 23 runs
Colts Cricket Club Ground, Colombo
Umpires: Pradeep Udawatta and Ranjith Vishwakula

- Bloomfield Cricket and Athletic Club won the toss and elected to field.

25 February 2018
Scorecard

Negombo Cricket Club; 143 (19.5 overs)	v	Saracens Sports Club; 148/2 (18.2 overs)
Lasith Croospulle 34 (22); Chathura Randunu 3/21 (4 overs)		Andy Solomons 60 (41); Umega Chaturanga 1/24 (3.2 overs)

Saracens Sports Club won by 8 wickets
Navy Ground, Welisara
Umpires: Raveendra Wimalasiri and Deepal Gunawardene

- Negombo Cricket Club won the toss and elected to bat.
- Avishka Fernando (Negombo Cricket Club) made his T20 debut.

25 February 2018
Scorecard

Sri Lanka Army Sports Club; 211/8 (20 overs)	v	Panadura Sports Club; 94/5 (13 overs)
Kasun de Silva 70 (47); Vinodh Perera 4/37 (4 overs)		Vinodh Perera 47* (35); Dushan Vimukthi 2/14 (3 overs)

Sri Lanka Army Sports Club won by 43 runs (D/L method)
Colts Cricket Club Ground, Colombo
Umpires: Pradeep Udawatta and Ranjith Vishwakula

- Panadura Sports Club won the toss and elected to field.
- Buddika Madushanka (Sri Lanka Army Sports Club), Krishan Dinidu, Praneeth Wijesena, Sakuranga Fonseka and Dulanjana Seneviratne (Panadura Sports Club) all made their T20 debuts.

27 February 2018
Scorecard

Colombo Cricket Club; 142/7 (20 overs)	v	Sri Lanka Army Sports Club; 142/9 (20 overs)
Kusal Mendis 64 (52); Seekkuge Prasanna 4/25 (4 overs)		Lakshan Edirisinghe 63* (48); Nuwan Thushara 3/25 (4 overs)

Match tied
Nondescripts Cricket Club Ground, Colombo
Umpires: Kitsiri Jayaweera and Saman Mohan de Silva

- Sri Lanka Army won the toss and elected to field.

27 February 2018
Scorecard

Bloomfield Cricket and Athletic Club; 187/7 (20 overs)	v	Saracens Sports Club; 74/1 (8 overs)
Lahiru Jayakody 81 (39); Ruvindu Gunasekera 3/28 (4 overs)		Thanuka Dabare 42* (24); Ramesh Mendis 1/39 (4 overs)

Saracens Sports Club won by 7 runs (D/L method)
Nondescripts Cricket Club Ground, Colombo
Umpires: Saman Mohan de Silva and Kitsiri Jayaweera

- Bloomfield Cricket and Athletic Club won the toss and elected to bat.

27 February 2018
Scorecard

Negombo Cricket Club; 145/8 (20 overs)	v	Panadura Sports Club; 115 (18.3 overs)
Sandun Dias 32 (27); Tharindu Maduranga 3/22 (4 overs)		Vishva Chathuranga 47 (26); Lasith Croospulle 3/20 (4 overs)

Negombo Cricket Club won by 30 runs
FTZ Sports Complex, Katunayake
Umpires: Eric Kannangara and Nilantha Bopage

- Negombo Cricket Club won the toss and elected to bat.
- Chanuka Bandara (Panadura Sports Club), Sewvinda Silva and Praween Dilanka (Negombo Cricket Club) all made their T20 debuts.

1 March 2018
Scorecard

Negombo Cricket Club; 125/6 (20 overs)	v	Bloomfield Cricket and Athletic Club; 117/9 (20 overs)
Dilasri Lokubandara 44 (36); Ramesh Mendis 2/17 (4 overs)		Ramesh Mendis 44 (42); Roshen Fernando 3/20 (4 overs)

Negambo Cricket Club won by 8 runs
Colombo Cricket Club Ground, Colombo
Umpires: Susantha Dissanayake and Krishantha Rodrigo

- Negambo Cricket Club won the toss and elected to bat.
- Thiran Dhanapala (Bloomfield Cricket and Athletic Club), HUD Fernando and Dinan Fernando (Negombo Cricket Club) all made their T20 debuts.

1 March 2018
Scorecard

Panadura Sports Club; 74/9 (20 overs)	v	Colombo Cricket Club; 75/3 (9.3 overs)
Shashrika Pussegolla 30 (37); Ashan Priyanjan 2/12 (4 overs)		Ashan Priyanjan 51* (29); Tharindu Fernando 2/33 (4 overs)

Colombo Cricket Club won by 7 wickets
FTZ Sports Complex, Katunayake
Umpires: Dilshan de Silva and Rohitha Kottahachchi

- Colombo Cricket Club won the toss and elected to field.
- Malindu Maduranga (Colombo Cricket Club) made his T20 debut.

1 March 2018
Scorecard

Sri Lanka Army Sports Club; 145/8 (20 overs)	v	Saracens Sports Club; 145/5 (20 overs)
Lakshan Edirisinghe 50* (37); Ruvindu Gunasekera 3/20 (4 overs)		Ruvindu Gunasekera 57 (50); Ajantha Mendis 2/16 (3 overs)

Match tied
Colombo Cricket Club Ground, Colombo
Umpires: Krishantha Rodrigo and Susantha Dissanayake

- Sri Lanka Army won the toss and elected to bat.
- Dilshan de Soysa (Sri Lanka Army Sports Club) made his T20 debut.

2 March 2018
Scorecard

Negombo Cricket Club; 101/8 (18 overs)	v	Colombo Cricket Club; 105/6 (16.5 overs)
Sandun Dias 28 (28); Lakshan Sandakan 3/11 (4 overs)		Madawa Warnapura 35* (33); Umega Chaturanga 3/18 (4 overs)

Colombo Cricket Club won by 4 wickets
Burgher Recreation Club Ground, Colombo
Umpires: Raveendra Wimalasiri and Dilshan de Silva

- Colombo Cricket Club won the toss and elected to field.
- Sandaruwan Rodrigo (Negombo Cricket Club) made his T20 debut.

2 March 2018
Scorecard

Bloomfield Cricket and Athletic Club; 144/8 (20 overs)	v	Sri Lanka Army Sports Club; 145/8 (19.4 overs)
Ramesh Mendis 31 (27); Janith Silva 4/30 (4 overs)		Ajantha Mendis 27* (15); Ramesh Mendis 3/16 (3.4 overs)

Sri Lanka Army Sports Club won by 2 wickets
Colts Cricket Club Ground, Colombo
Umpires: Asanga Jayasooriya and Chaminda Hathurusingha

- Bloomfield Cricket and Athletic Club won the toss and elected to bat.
- Kasun Ekanayake (Bloomfield Cricket and Athletic Club) made his T20 debut.

2 March 2018
Scorecard

Saracens Sports Club; 160/8 (20 overs)	v	Panadura Sports Club; 107/8 (16.3 overs)
Ruvindu Gunasekera 81* (64); Ryan Kern 2/16 (2 overs)		Praneeth Wijesena 34 (21); Ruvindu Gunasekera 2/28 (4 overs)

Saracens Sports Club won by 34 runs (D/L method)
Colts Cricket Club Ground, Colombo
Umpires: Chaminda Hathurusingha and Asanga Jayasooriya

- Saracens Sports Club won the toss and elected to bat.
- Ryan Kern, Sameendra Madushan and Ashan Abeykoon (Panadura Sports Club) all made their T20 debuts.

==== Group B ====
24 February 2018
Scorecard

Colts Cricket Club; 198/3 (20 overs)	v	Sri Lanka Air Force Sports Club; 141 (19.4 overs)
Avishka Fernando 74 (39); Roscoe Thattil 2/27 (4 overs)		Shohan Rangika 21 (12); Prabath Jayasuriya 4/17 (4 overs)

Colts Cricket Club won by 57 runs
Army Ground, Panagoda
Umpires: Sisira Kumara Perera and Keerthi Bandara

- Sri Lanka Air Force Sports Club won the toss and elected to field.
- Avishka Fernando, Kavishka Anjula (Colts Cricket Club), Hashan Harshana James, Udayawansha Parakrama, Danushka Bandara, Dilip Tharaka, Sachika Udara, Milan Rathnayake, Buddika Sandaruwan and Sanjaya Ranaweera (Sri Lanka Air Force Sports Club) all made their T20 debuts.

24 February 2018
Scorecard

Galle Cricket Club; 144 (19.4 overs)	v	Sri Lanka Ports Authority Cricket Club; 145/6 (17.5 overs)
Harsha Rajapaksha 48 (26); Ranesh Perera 5/20 (4 overs)		Yohan de Silva 50 (45); Chathura Lakshan 2/21 (4 overs)

Sri Lanka Ports Authority Cricket Club won by 4 wickets
Army Ground, Panagoda
Umpires: Sisira Kumara Perera and Keerthi Bandara

- Galle Cricket Club won the toss and elected to bat.
- Ravindu Sembukuttige, Sahan Peiris, Raveen Sayer, Chathura Lakshan and Hareen Buddila (Galle Cricket Club) all made their T20 debuts.

24 February 2018
Scorecard

Lankan Cricket Club; 135/7 (20 overs)	v	Tamil Union Cricket and Athletic Club; 138/3 (15.3 overs)
Dinushka Malan 35 (28); Jeevan Mendis 2/23 (4 overs)		Dhananjaya de Silva 42 (26); Navin Kavikara 2/25 (3 overs)

Tamil Union Cricket and Athletic Club won by 7 wickets
Bloomfield Cricket and Athletic Club Ground, Colombo
Umpires: Ranganath Prasanna and Kamal Indrajith

- Lankan Cricket Club won the toss and elected to bat.
- Lakshan Rodrigo, Sajana de Silva, Dinushka Malan, Rajitha Ranaweera and Poorna Charuka (Lankan Cricket Club) all made their T20 debuts.

25 February 2018
Scorecard

Colts Cricket Club; 197/5 (20 overs)	v	Galle Cricket Club; 60 (12.4 overs)
Sahan Arachchige 66* (29); Rajith Priyan 2/38 (4 overs)		Chanaka Wijesinghe 18 (14); Prabath Jayasuriya 4/8 (4 overs)

Colts Cricket Club won by 137 runs
Police Park Ground, Colombo
Umpires: Ravindra Kottahachchi and Maurice Zilva

- Galle Cricket Club won the toss and elected to field.
- Dilshan Kanchana and Nilanka Rukshitha (Galle Cricket Club) both made their T20 debuts.

25 February 2018
Scorecard

Sri Lanka Ports Authority Cricket Club; 172/9 (20 overs)	v	Lankan Cricket Club; 16/1 (2 overs)
Gayan Maneeshan 31* (33); Navin Kavikara 3/34 (4 overs)		Maduranga Zoysa 12* (5); Akalanka Ganegama 1/3 (1 over)

No result
Police Park Ground, Colombo
Umpires: Ravindra Kottahachchi and Maurice Zilva

- Sri Lanka Ports Authority Cricket Club won the toss and elected to bat.
- Sajith Dissanayaka (Lankan Cricket Club) made his T20 debut.

25 February 2018
Scorecard

Sri Lanka Air Force Sports Club; 129 (19.5 overs)	v	Tamil Union Cricket and Athletic Club; 133/8 (20 overs)
Sachika Udara 26 (27); Pramod Madushan 4/27 (3.5 overs)		Binura Fernando 36 (24); Milan Rathnayake 3/24 (4 overs)

Tamil Union Cricket and Athletic Club won by 2 wickets
Navy Ground, Welisara
Umpires: Deepal Gunawardene and Raveendra Wimalasiri

- Sri Lanka Air Force Sports Club won the toss and elected to bat.
- DT Liyanage and Nimesha Mendis (Sri Lanka Air Force Sports Club) both made their T20 debuts.

27 February 2018
Scorecard

Sri Lanka Ports Authority Cricket Club; 147 (19.1 overs)	v	Colts Cricket Club; 150/4 (18.5 overs)
Yohan de Silva 53 (42); Kavishka Anjula 2/14 (2.1 overs)		Kusal Perera 64 (38); Ranesh Perera 2/20 (4 overs)

Colts Cricket Club won by 6 wickets
Colombo Cricket Club Ground, Colombo
Umpires: Asanga Jayasooriya and Thilak Fernando

- Colts Cricket Club won the toss and elected to field.

27 February 2018
Scorecard

Galle Cricket Club; 138/5 (20 overs)	v	Tamil Union Cricket and Athletic Club; 138/9 (20 overs)
Dilshan Kanchana 50 (48); Pramod Madushan 2/27 (4 overs)		Dhananjaya de Silva 55 (38); Rajith Priyan 4/18 (4 overs)

Match tied
FTZ Sports Complex, Katunayake
Umpires: Nilantha Bopage and Eric Kannangara

- Tamil Union Cricket and Athletic Club won the toss and elected to field.
- Disnaka Manoj (Tamil Union Cricket and Athletic Club) made his T20 debut.

27 February 2018
Scorecard

Lankan Cricket Club; 145 (18.3 overs)	v	Sri Lanka Air Force Sports Club; 61/9 (9 overs)
Maduranga Zoysa 38 (24); Milan Rathnayake 3/21 (3 overs)		Udayawansha Parakrama 36* (28); Rajeewa Weerasinghe 1/2 (1 over)

Sri Lanka Air Force Sports Club won by 5 runs (D/L method)
Colombo Cricket Club Ground, Colombo
Umpires: Asanga Jayasooriya and Thilak Fernando

- Lankan Cricket Club won the toss and elected to bat.

1 March 2018
Scorecard

Lankan Cricket Club; 83/9 (16 overs)	v	Colts Cricket Club; 84/1 (10.3 overs)
Dinushka Malan 30 (29); Nisala Tharaka 3/22 (4 overs)		Avishka Fernando 49* (35); Rajeewa Weerasinghe 1/20 (2 overs)

Colts Cricket Club won by 9 wickets
Burgher Recreation Club Ground, Colombo
Umpires: Upul Wewage and Hemantha Boteju

- Colts Cricket Club won the toss and elected to field.
- Methsith Jayamanna (Lankan Cricket Club) made his T20 debut.

1 March 2018
Scorecard

Galle Cricket Club; 64 (15.4 overs)	v	Sri Lanka Air Force Sports Club; 65/5 (13.4 overs)
Harsha Rajapaksha 18 (16); Buddika Sandaruwan 4/9 (3.4 overs)		Roscoe Thattil 25* (34); Raveen Sayer 4/13 (4 overs)

Sri Lanka Air Force Sports Club won by 5 wickets
Burgher Recreation Club Ground, Colombo
Umpires: Upul Wewage and Hemantha Boteju

- Galle Cricket Club won the toss and elected to bat.

1 March 2018
Scorecard

Tamil Union Cricket and Athletic Club; 187/5 (20 overs)	v	Sri Lanka Ports Authority Cricket Club; 72 (13.5 overs)
Ravindu Kodituwakku 79* (57); Nalin Priyadarshana 3/20 (4 overs)		Ranesh Perera 15 (20); Dulanjana Mendis 4/19 (4 overs)

Tamil Union Cricket and Athletic Club won by 115 runs
FTZ Sports Complex, Katunayake
Umpires: Rohitha Kottahachchi and Dilshan de Silva

- Tamil Union Cricket and Athletic Club won the toss and elected to bat.
- Ravindu Kodituwakku (Tamil Union Cricket and Athletic Club) and Nalin Priyadarshana (Sri Lanka Ports Authority Cricket Club) both made their T20 debuts.

2 March 2018
Scorecard

Tamil Union Cricket and Athletic Club; 77 (11.3 overs)	v	Colts Cricket Club; 78/4 (10.3 overs)
Binura Fernando 22 (23); Nisala Tharaka 3/8 (2 overs)		Sahan Arachchige 32 (24); Binura Fernando 2/19 (3 overs)

Colts Cricket Club won by 6 wickets
Nondescripts Cricket Club Ground, Colombo
Umpires: Gamini Dissanayake and Kitsiri Jayaweera

- Tamil Union Cricket and Athletic Club won the toss and elected to bat.

2 March 2018
Scorecard

Galle Cricket Club; 148/7 (20 overs)	v	Lankan Cricket Club; 133 (19.1 overs)
Harsha Rajapaksha 43 (22); Nelum Kumara 3/13 (4 overs)		Lakshan Rodrigo 40 (19); Gayan Sirisoma 2/17 (4 overs)

Galle Cricket Club won by 15 runs
Nondescripts Cricket Club Ground, Colombo
Umpires: Gamini Dissanayake and Kitsiri Jayaweera

- Galle Cricket Club won the toss and elected to bat.
- Thanura Gunasekera (Lankan Cricket Club) made his T20 debut.

2 March 2018
Scorecard

Sri Lanka Ports Authority Cricket Club; 99 (18.5 overs)	v	Sri Lanka Air Force Sports Club; 100/7 (16.4 overs)
Gayan Maneeshan 35* (40); Dilip Tharaka 2/10 (4 overs)		Roscoe Thattil 43* (32); Gayan Maneeshan 2/1 (1 over)

Sri Lanka Air Force Sports Club won by 3 wickets
Burgher Recreation Club Ground, Colombo
Umpires: Raveendra Wimalasiri and Dilshan de Silva

- Sri Lanka Ports Authority Cricket Club won the toss and elected to bat.
- Chathura Milan (Sri Lanka Ports Authority Cricket Club), Kasun Abeyrathne, Milan Ratnayake and Madushanka Premaratne (Sri Lanka Air Force Sports Club) all made their T20 debuts.

==== Group C ====
24 February 2018
Scorecard

Nondescripts Cricket Club; 120/9 (20 overs)	v	Kalutara Town Club; 104 (18.4 overs)
Angelo Perera 46 (42); Eranga Rathnayake 5/20 (4 overs)		Sameera Sadamal 29 (23); Chaturanga de Silva 3/24 (3 overs)

Nondescripts Cricket Club won by 16 runs
Burgher Recreation Club Ground, Colombo
Umpires: Hemantha Boteju and Rohitha Kottahachchi

- Kalutara Town Club won the toss and elected to field.
- Lahiru Kumara (Nondescripts Cricket Club), Sameera Sadamal, M Nimesh, Devind Pathmanathan, Pasindu Madushan and Vihanga Kalhara (Kalutara Town Club) all made their T20 debuts.

24 February 2018
Scorecard

Burgher Recreation Club; 182/6 (20 overs)	v	Ragama Cricket Club; 186/6 (19.1 overs)
Rumesh Buddika 57 (46); Ishan Jayaratne 2/29 (4 overs)		Lahiru Milantha 47 (24); Tillakaratne Sampath 3/22 (4 overs)

Ragama Cricket Club won by 4 wickets
Colts Cricket Club Ground, Colombo
Umpires: Pradeep Udawatta and Sanjeewa Fernando

- Ragama Cricket Club won the toss and elected to field.
- Nishan Peiris, Kushan Weerakkody (Ragama Cricket Club), Pravinath Wijesooriya and Shashin Dilranga (Burgher Recreation Club) all made their T20 debuts.

24 February 2018
Scorecard

Sri Lanka Police Sports Club; 121 (19.4 overs)	v	Chilaw Marians Cricket Club; 125/3 (14.4 overs)
Srimantha Wijeratne 22 (24); Shehan Jayasuriya 3/24 (4 overs)		Damodaran Rohit 56* (42); Dhanuka Pathirana 1/25 (2 overs)

Chilaw Marians Cricket Club won by 7 wickets
Burgher Recreation Club Ground, Colombo
Umpires: Hemantha Boteju and Rohitha Kottahachchi

- Police Sports Club won the toss and elected to bat.
- Asitha Fernando (Chilaw Marians Cricket Club), Nishantha Kumara, Tharindu Dilshan, Hasitha Lakmal de Silva, Sachitha Jayathilake and Nimesh Vimukthi (Sri Lanka Police Sports Club) all made their T20 debuts.

25 February 2018
Scorecard

Nondescripts Cricket Club; 206/6 (20 overs)	v	Sri Lanka Police Sports Club; 167/7 (20 overs)
Niroshan Dickwella 60 (37); Buddika Sanjeewa 2/45 (4 overs)		Mahesh Priyadarshana 61 (46); Lasith Malinga 3/31 (4 overs)

Nondescripts Cricket Club won by 39 runs
Bloomfield Cricket and Athletic Club Ground, Colombo
Umpires: Gamini Dissanayake and Mohan de Silva

- Nondescripts Cricket Club won the toss and elected to bat.
- Hasitha Nirmal (Sri Lanka Police Sports Club) made his T20 debut.

25 February 2018
Scorecard

Kalutara Town Club; 54 (19.4 overs)	v	Ragama Cricket Club; 58/3 (10.1 overs)
Pasindu Madushan 13 (27); Nishan Peiris 4/3 (4 overs)		Shehan Fernando 22 (28); Lakshan Jayasinghe 1/6 (1 over)

Ragama Cricket Club won by 7 wickets
Burgher Recreation Club Ground, Colombo
Umpires: Nilan De Silva and Prageeth Rambukwella

- Ragama Cricket Club won the toss and elected to field.
- Nipuna Gamage (Kalutara Town Club) made his T20 debut.

25 February 2018
Scorecard

Chilaw Marians Cricket Club; 144 (19.5 overs)	v	Burgher Recreation Club
Dasun Senevirathna 25 (15); Tillakaratne Sampath 4/19 (3.5 overs)

No result
Bloomfield Cricket and Athletic Club Ground, Colombo
Umpires: Mohan de Silva and Gamini Dissanayake

- Chilaw Marians Cricket Club won the toss and elected to bat.
- Dasun Senevirathna (Chilaw Marians Cricket Club), Himesh Ramanayake and Lisula Lakshan (Burgher Recreation Club) all made their T20 debuts.

27 February 2018
Scorecard

Chilaw Marians Cricket Club; 146/8 (20 overs)	v	Ragama Cricket Club; 131/8 (20 overs)
Damodaran Rohit 42 (39); Kushan Weerakkody 4/31 (4 overs)		Shehan Fernando 33 (25); Isuru Udana 2/13 (3 overs)

Chilaw Marians Cricket Club won by 15 runs
Colts Cricket Club Ground, Colombo
Umpires: R P Massalage and Lyndon Hannibal

- Ragama Cricket Club won the toss and elected to field.

27 February 2018
Scorecard

Sri Lanka Police Sports Club; 161/9 (16 overs)	v	Kalutara Town Club; 119/6 (16 overs)
Samith Dushantha 44 (24); Eranga Rathnayake 2/28 (3 overs)		Matheesha Perera 23 (24); Nimesh Vimukthi 3/14 (4 overs)

Police Sports Club won by 42 runs
Burgher Recreation Club Ground, Colombo
Umpires: Jayantha de Silva and Kamal Indrajith

- Police Sports Club won the toss and elected to bat.
- Shanaka Sampath and Geeth Perera (Kalutara Town Club) both made their T20 debuts.

27 February 2018
Scorecard

Burgher Recreation Club; 143/9 (20 overs)	v	Nondescripts Cricket Club; 93/1 (10.3 overs)
Tillakaratne Sampath 44 (44); Lasith Malinga 3/24 (4 overs)		Niroshan Dickwella 38* (28); Himesh Ramanayake 1/4 (1 over)

Nondescripts Cricket Club won by 28 runs (D/L method)
Colts Cricket Club Ground, Colombo
Umpires: R P Massalage and Lyndon Hannibal

- Burgher Recreation Club won the toss and elected to bat.

1 March 2018
Scorecard

Sri Lanka Police Sports Club; 125/9 (20 overs)	v	Burgher Recreation Club; 126/5 (18 overs)
Manjula Jayawardene 32* (26); Tillakaratne Sampath 3/32 (4 overs)		Lisula Lakshan 57 (52); Geeth Silva 1/18 (2 overs)

Burgher Recreation Club won by 5 wickets
Nondescripts Cricket Club Ground, Colombo
Umpires: Nilan De Silva and Ranganath Prasanna

- Police Sports Club won the toss and elected to bat.
- Nimantha Gunasiri (Burgher Recreation Club) made his T20 debut.

1 March 2018
Scorecard

Kalutara Town Club; 140/6 (20 overs)	v	Chilaw Marians Cricket Club; 143/4 (13.2 overs)
Nilushan Nonis 58* (58); Thikshila de Silva 2/25 (4 overs)		Thikshila de Silva 72 (31); Nipuna Kariyawasam 2/18 (3 overs)

Chilaw Marians Cricket Club won by 6 wickets
Bloomfield Cricket and Athletic Club Ground, Colombo
Umpires: Pradeep Udawatta and Prageeth Rambukwella

- Chilaw Marians Cricket Club won the toss and elected to field.
- Charith Rajapakshe (Chilaw Marians Cricket Club) made his T20 debut.

1 March 2018
Scorecard

Ragama Cricket Club; 165/8 (20 overs)	v	Nondescripts Cricket Club; 107 (14.2 overs)
Shehan Fernando 47 (31); Chaturanga de Silva 4/27 (4 overs)		Niroshan Dickwella 27 (18); Janith Liyanage 2/20 (3 overs)

Ragama Cricket Club won by 58 runs
Bloomfield Cricket and Athletic Club Ground, Colombo
Umpires: Pradeep Udawatta and Prageeth Rambukwella

- Ragama Cricket Club won the toss and elected to bat.
- Aravinda Akurugoda (Ragama Cricket Club) made his T20 debut.

2 March 2018
Scorecard

Nondescripts Cricket Club; 123/7 (13 overs)	v	Chilaw Marians Cricket Club; 54 (9.4 overs)
Angelo Perera 39 (24); Malinda Pushpakumara 2/9 (2 overs)		Malinda Pushpakumara 24* (18); Chaturanga de Silva 3/20 (2.4 overs)

Nondescripts Cricket Club won by 69 runs
Colombo Cricket Club Ground, Colombo
Umpires: Prageeth Rambukwella and Maurice Zilva

- Chilaw Marians Cricket Club won the toss and elected to field.

2 March 2018
Scorecard

Kalutara Town Club; 100/9 (20 overs)	v	Burgher Recreation Club; 101/4 (15.4 overs)
Devind Pathmanathan 39 (41); Tillakaratne Sampath 3/13 (4 overs)		Lasith Lakshan 22 (19); Nipuna Kariyawasam 3/24 (4 overs)

Burgher Recreation Club won by 6 wickets
FTZ Sports Complex, Katunayake
Umpires: Nilantha Bopage and Ranjith Vishwakula

- Burgher Recreation Club won the toss and elected to field.
- Chameera Dissanayake (Burgher Recreation Club), Rusiru Jayasiri, Chrishen Aponsu, Tharindu Madushanka and Ravindu Tillakaratne (Kalutara Town Club) all made their T20 debuts.

2 March 2018
Scorecard

Sri Lanka Police Sports Club; 133 (19.5 overs)	v	Ragama Cricket Club; 137/6 (18.1 overs)
Srimantha Wijeratne 48 (38); Janith Liyanage 3/17 (4 overs)		Lahiru Thirimanne 45* (39); Mahesh Priyadarshana 2/24 (4 overs)

Ragama Cricket Club won by 4 wickets
Colombo Cricket Club Ground, Colombo
Umpires: Maurice Zilva and Prageeth Rambukwella

- Police Sports Club won the toss and elected to bat.
- Chamod Piumal (Police Sports Club) made his T20 debut.

==== Group D ====
24 February 2018
Scorecard

Badureliya Sports Club; 163/6 (20 overs)	v	Sri Lanka Navy Sports Club; 100 (14.5 overs)
Sanjaya Chathuranga 52* (43); Nuwan Sampath 2/26 (4 overs)		Nuwan Sampath 32* (31); Sanjaya Chathuranga 2/17 (2.5 overs)

Badureliya Sports Club won by 63 runs
Air Force Ground, Katunayake
Umpires: Susantha Dissanayake and Vidura Prasad

- Sri Lanka Navy Sports Club won the toss and elected to field.
- Pathum Nissanka, Hashan Upendra, Salinda Ushan, Sanjaya Chathuranga, Nimanda Madushanka, Savith Priyan (Badureliya Sports Club), Mohammed Alfar, Buddika Hasaranga, Tharushan Iddamalgoda, Thushara Madushanka, Ishan Abeysekara, Nuwan Sampath, Shathik Nimalsha and Amila Madusanka (Sri Lanka Navy Sports Club) all made their T20 debuts.

24 February 2018
Scorecard

Sinhalese Sports Club; 137 (19.1 overs)	v	Moors Sports Club; 138/7 (19.5 overs)
Dimuth Karunaratne 48 (35); Adeesha Thilanchana 3/17 (3 overs)		Adeesha Thilanchana 45 (35); Sachithra Senanayake 3/10 (4 overs)

Moors Sports Club won by 3 wickets
Colts Cricket Club Ground, Colombo
Umpires: Pradeep Udawatta and Sanjeewa Fernando

- Moors Sports Club won the toss and elected to field.
- Shammu Ashan (Sinhalese Sports Club) and Nilanka Sandakan (Moors Sports Club) both made their T20 debuts.

25 February 2018
Scorecard

Badureliya Sports Club; 111 (19.1 overs)	v	Sinhalese Sports Club; 71/7 (13 overs)
Sanjaya Chathuranga 27 (21); Akash Senaratne 3/11 (4 overs)		Dimuth Karunaratne 21 (29); Dilesh Gunaratne 2/12 (4 overs)

Badureliya Sports Club won by 10 runs (D/L method)
Burgher Recreation Club Ground, Colombo
Umpires: Nilan De Silva and Prageeth Rambukwella

- Badureliya Sports Club won the toss and elected to bat.
- Akash Senaratne (Sinhalese Sports Club), Ramindu Nikeshala and Sachin Fernando (Badureliya Sports Club) all made their T20 debuts.

25 February 2018
Scorecard

Kurunegala Youth Cricket Club; 127 (19.4 overs)	v	Moors Sports Club; 128/7 (18.3 overs)
Charith Mendis 26 (16); Nilanka Sandakan 2/19 (4 overs)		Charitha Kumarasinghe 36 (22); Kalhan Sineth 3/25 (4 overs)

Moors Sports Club won by 3 wickets
Army Ground, Panagoda
Umpires: Asanga Jayasooriya and Keerthi Bandara

- Kurunegala Youth Cricket Club won the toss and elected to bat.
- Dhanushka Dharmasiri, Charith Mendis, Keshan Wanniarchchi, Ruwantha Ekanayake, Malith Premathilake, Sarinda Dassanayake, Kalhan Sineth, Chandima Vijayabandara and Manelka Dharmadasa (Kurunegala Youth Cricket Club) all made their T20 debuts.

27 February 2018
Scorecard

Kurunegala Youth Cricket Club; 125/9 (20 overs)	v	Badureliya Sports Club; 129/4 (19.3 overs)
Ruwantha Ekanayake 41 (32); Dilesh Gunaratne 3/12 (4 overs)		Dilhan Cooray 53* (49); Malith Cooray 2/18 (4 overs)

Badureliya Sports Club won by 6 wickets
Panadura Esplanade, Panadura
Umpires: Vidura Prasad and Nilantha Semasinghe

- Badureliya Sports Club won the toss and elected to field.
- Damith Perera and Prabhash Keppitipola (Kurunegala Youth Cricket Club) both made their T20 debuts.

27 February 2018
Scorecard

Sinhalese Sports Club; 203/5 (20 overs)	v	Sri Lanka Navy Sports Club; 96 (18.3 overs)
Thisara Perera 84 (30); Shathik Nimalsha 3/25 (4 overs)		Supun Leelaratne 35 (29); Akash Senaratne 4/22 (4 overs)

Sinhalese Sports Club won by 107 runs
Burgher Recreation Club Ground, Colombo
Umpires: Nilantha Semasinghe and Vidura Prasad

- Sinhalese Sports Club won the toss and elected to bat.
- Kusal Edussooriya and Supun Leelaratne (Sri Lanka Navy Sports Club) both made their T20 debuts.

1 March 2018
Scorecard

Kurunegala Youth Cricket Club; 72 (16.4 overs)	v	Sinhalese Sports Club; 73/4 (12.2 overs)
Ruwantha Ekanayake 26 (24); Jeffrey Vandersay 3/12 (4 overs)		Dimuth Karunaratne 19 (17); Kalhan Sineth 1/12 (3 overs)

Sinhalese Sports Club won by 6 wickets
Police Park Ground, Colombo

- Sinhalese Sports Club won the toss and elected to field.
- Dilan Jayalath and Charith Asalanka (Sinhalese Sports Club) both made their T20 debuts.

1 March 2018
Scorecard

Sri Lanka Navy Sports Club; 85 (17.1 overs)	v	Moors Sports Club; 89/2 (13.5 overs)
Ishan Abeysekara 27 (14); Supeshala Jayathilake 4/8 (2.1 overs)		Irosh Samarasooriya 29* (31); Nuwan Sampath 2/25 (4 overs)

Moors Sports Club won by 8 wickets
Nondescripts Cricket Club Ground, Colombo
Umpires: Nilan De Silva and Ranganath Prasanna

- Sri Lanka Navy Sports Club won the toss and elected to bat.
- Chenutha Wickramasinghe (Sri Lanka Navy Sports Club) made his T20 debut.

2 March 2018
Scorecard

Moors Sports Club; 155/8 (17 overs)	v	Badureliya Sports Club; 114/7 (17 overs)
Chamara Silva 45 (30); Alankara Asanka Silva 3/22 (3 overs)		Sanjaya Chathuranga 60* (45); Adeesha Thilanchana 3/17 (3 overs)

Moors Sports Club won by 41 runs
Bloomfield Cricket and Athletic Club Ground, Colombo
Umpires: Pradeep Udawatta and Krishantha Rodrigo

- Moors Sports Club won the toss and elected to bat.
- Chanuk Dilshan (Moors Sports Club) and Mahela Vijelath (Badureliya Sports Club) made their T20 debuts.

2 March 2018
Scorecard

Sri Lanka Navy Sports Club; 142/9 (20 overs)	v	Kurunegala Youth Cricket Club; 133/9 (20 overs)
Dushan Hemantha 40 (31); Dhanushka Dharmasiri 3/22 (3 overs)		Dhanushka Dharmasiri 27 (27); Amila Madusanka 2/20 (4 overs)

Sri Lanka Navy Sports Club won by 9 runs
Bloomfield Cricket and Athletic Club Ground, Colombo
Umpires: Krishantha Rodrigo and Pradeep Udawatta

- Sri Lanka Navy Sports Club won the toss and elected to bat.
- Asiri de Silva, Buddika Madushan (Sri Lanka Navy Sports Club) and Tharinda Wijesinghe (Kurunegala Youth Cricket Club) all made their T20 debuts.

=== Knockout stage ===
==== Quarterfinals ====
1st Quarterfinal
4 March 2018
Scorecard

Badureliya Sports Club; 107/9 (20 overs)	v	Colombo Cricket Club; 108/2 (12.3 overs)
Sanjaya Chathuranga 21 (29); Lahiru Madushanka 4/15 (4 overs)		Dilshan Munaweera 70* (51); Sanjaya Chathuranga 1/10 (1.3 overs)

Colombo Cricket Club won by 8 wickets
FTZ Sports Complex, Katunayake
Umpires: Rohitha Kottahachchi and Pradeep Udawatta

- Colombo Cricket Club won the toss and elected to field.

2nd Quarterfinal
4 March 2018
Scorecard

Nondescripts Cricket Club; 165/6 (20 overs)	v	Colts Cricket Club; 159/8 (20 overs)
Chaturanga de Silva 46* (26); Dilruwan Perera 2/23 (4 overs)		Sadeera Samarawickrama 35 (22); Lasith Malinga 3/14 (4 overs)

Nondescripts Cricket Club won by 6 runs
FTZ Sports Complex, Katunayake
Umpires: Pradeep Udawatta and Rohitha Kottahachchi

- Colts Cricket Club won the toss and elected to field.

3rd Quarterfinal
4 March 2018
Scorecard

Ragama Cricket Club; 149/6 (20 overs)	v	Tamil Union Cricket and Athletic Club; 150/1 (14.4 overs)
Janith Liyanage 34 (29); Binura Fernando 2/21 (4 overs)		Ramith Rambukwella 68* (40)

Tamil Union Cricket and Athletic Club won by 9 wickets
Colombo Cricket Club Ground, Colombo
Umpires: Ravindra Kottahachchi and Hemantha Boteju

- Ragama Cricket Club won the toss and elected to bat.

4th Quarterfinal
4 March 2018
Scorecard

Sri Lanka Army Sports Club; 129 (18.4 overs)	v	Moors Sports Club; 95 (18.4 overs)
Leo Fransisco 31 (24); Tharindu Ratnayake 3/21 (4 overs)		Kosala Kulasekara 40 (38); Janith Silva 3/3 (2.4 overs)

Sri Lanka Army Sports Club won by 34 runs
Colombo Cricket Club Ground, Colombo
Umpires: Hemantha Boteju and Ravindra Kottahachchi

- Sri Lanka Army Sports Club won the toss and elected to bat.

==== Finals ====
1st Semi-final
6 March 2018
Scorecard

Colombo Cricket Club; 173/6 (20 overs)	v	Tamil Union Cricket and Athletic Club; 131 (18.2 overs)
Wanindu Hasaranga 74 (41); Binura Fernando 2/15 (4 overs)		Manoj Sarathchandra 35 (21); Sachith Pathirana 4/17 (4 overs)

Colombo Cricket Club won by 42 runs
P Sara Oval, Colombo
Umpires: Nilan De Silva and Prageeth Rambukwella

- Tamil Union Cricket and Athletic Club won the toss and elected to field.

2nd Semi-final
6 March 2018
Scorecard

Sri Lanka Army Sports Club; 102 (17.1 overs)	v	Nondescripts Cricket Club; 108/4 (14.2 overs)
Himasha Liyanage 23 (25); Lasith Malinga 3/14 (3.1 overs)		Lahiru Udara 27 (27); Navantha Rathnayake 1/9 (1 over)

Nondescripts Cricket Club won by 6 wickets
P Sara Oval, Colombo
Umpires: Prageeth Rambukwella and Nilan De Silva

- Sri Lanka Army won the toss and elected to bat.

Final
8 March 2018
Scorecard

Nondescripts Cricket Club; 183/7 (20 overs)	v	Colombo Cricket Club; 177 (19.3 overs)
Bhanuka Rajapaksa 79 (51); Nuwan Thushara 4/32 (4 overs)		Sachith Pathirana 47 (26); Chamika Karunaratne 4/28 (3.3 overs)

Nondescripts Cricket Club won by 6 runs
P Sara Oval, Colombo
Umpires: Pradeep Udawatta and Rohitha Kottahachchi

- Colombo Cricket Club won the toss and elected to field.
