= Nimesh =

Nimesh is both a given name and a surname. Notable people with the name include:

- Nimesh Bandara (born 1997), Sri Lankan cricketer
- Nimesh Kampani (born 1946), Indian investment banker
- Nimesh Kariyawasam (born 1994), Sri Lankan cricketer
- Nimesh Patel (born 1986), American comedian
- Nimesh Perera (born 1977), Sri Lankan cricketer
- Nimesh Perera (cricketer, born 1982), Sri Lankan cricketer
- Nimesh Vimukthi (born 1997), Sri Lankan cricketer
- Madhawa Nimesh (born 1996), Sri Lankan cricketer
- Thilan Nimesh (born 1997), Sri Lankan cricketer
