= 2016–17 Districts One Day Tournament =

Cricket tournament

- Dates: 15 March – 2 April 2017
- Administrator: Sri Lanka Cricket
- Cricket format: List A cricket
- Tournament format: Round-robin then knockout
- Host: Sri Lanka
- Champions: Colombo District (1st title)
- Participants: 24
- Matches: 55

The 2016–17 Districts One Day Tournament was a List A cricket competition that took place in Sri Lanka. It replaced the scheduled Premier Limited Overs Tournament, after a legal challenge from Negombo Cricket Club, after they were removed from Tier B of the 2016–17 Premier League Tournament. The challenge stopped the Premier Limited Overs Tournament from taking place, but Sri Lanka Cricket (SLC) organised this tournament to replace it.

The tournament started on 15 March 2017, with 24 teams split into eight groups of three, with the matches given List A status. The final was played between Kegalle District and Colombo District at the P Sara Oval, Colombo, with Colombo District winning by 72 runs.

== Group stage ==
The following fixtures took place in the group stage of the tournament. For some fixtures, the complete scorecards are unknown, but local sources state that the matches did take place.

=== Central Group ===
15 March 2017
Scorecard

Kandy District; 266/8 (50 overs)	v	Nuwara Eliya District; 198/9 (45 overs)
Sachithra Senanayake 62 (61); Promod Maduwantha 3/41 (10 overs)		Primosh Perera 69 (82); Sachithra Senanayake 3/24 (10 overs)

Kandy District won by 57 runs (D/L method)
Sinhalese Sports Club Ground, Colombo
Umpires: Hemantha Boteju and Kapila Kottahachchi

- Kandy District won the toss and elected to bat.
- Nilanka Sandakan and Promod Maduwantha (Nuwara Eliya District) both made their List A debuts.

18 March 2017
Scorecard

Matale District; 122 (37.1 overs)	v	Kandy District; 123/1 (21.1 overs)
Buddika Hasaranga 53 (76); Jeffrey Vandersay 3/31 (10 overs)		Minod Bhanuka 70* (65); Ishan Abeysekara 1/25 (3 overs)

Kandy District won by 9 wickets
Navy Ground, Welisara
Umpires: SH Sarathkumara and Upul Wewage

- Kandy District won the toss and elected to field.
- Amith Eranda, Madura Madushanka, Kusal Edussooriya, Sameera Sadamal, Dinushka Malan, Ashan Ranasinghe and Ishan Abeysekara (Matale District) all made their List A debuts.

19 March 2017
Scorecard

Nuwara Eliya District; 314/9 (50 overs)	v	Matale District; 287/8 (50 overs)
Ruvindu Gunasekera 107 (121); Amith Eranda 4/56 (8 overs)		Madura Madushanka 107* (135); Sachithra Perera 4/40 (10 overs)

Nuwara Eliya District won by 27 runs
Navy Ground, Welisara
Umpires: Gamini Dissanayake and Rohitha Kottahachchi

- Nuwara Eliya District won the toss and elected to bat.
- Ruwan Chathuranga (Nuwara Eliya District) made his List A debut.

21 March 2017
Scorecard

Kandy District; 209 (43 overs)	v	Nuwara Eliya District; 113 (38 overs)
Dimuth Karunaratne 110* (140); Ruvindu Gunasekera 4/37 (8 overs)		Promod Maduwantha 36 (73); Kasun Madushanka 6/32 (9 overs)

Kandy District won by 96 runs
Moors Sports Club Ground, Colombo
Umpires: Deepal Gunawardene and Pradeep Udawatta

- Kandy District won the toss and elected to bat.
- Umesh Kasun and Irshad Umar (Nuwara Eliya District) both made their List A debuts.

24 March 2017
Scorecard

Nuwara Eliya District; 184 (43 overs)	v	Matale District; 185/5 (36.5 overs)
Primosh Perera 35 (51); Kalhara Peiris 5/25 (7 overs)		Kusal Edusuriya 90* (95); Ruvindu Gunasekera 3/44 (8 overs)

Matale District won by 5 wickets
Moors Sports Club Ground, Colombo
Umpires: Vidura Prasad and Upul Wewage

- Nuwara Eliya District won the toss and elected to bat.
- Shathik Nimalsha and Kalhara Peiris (Matale District) both made their List A debuts.

25 March 2017
Scorecard

Kandy District; 284/9 (50 overs)	v	Matale District; 190 (42.1 overs)
Kavindu Kulasekara 59 (83); Kalhara Peiris 2/40 (8 overs)		Kusal Edusuriya 57 (60); Jeffrey Vandersay 3/36 (9.1 overs)

Kandy District won by 94 runs
Navy Ground, Welisara
Umpires: Lyndon Hannibal and Ravindra Kottahachchi

- Kandy District won the toss and elected to bat.
- Akash Senaratne (Kandy District) made his List A debut.

=== Eastern Group ===
15 March 2017
Scorecard

Batticaloa District; 241 (49 overs)	v	Ampara District; 202 (47.4 overs)
Chanaka Wijesinghe 48 (61); Saliya Saman 3/35 (10 overs)		Nadeera Nawela 46 (89); Tillakaratne Sampath 3/45 (9.4 overs)

Batticaloa District won by 39 runs
Burgher Recreation Club Ground, Colombo
Umpires: Dilshan de Silva and Krishantha Rodrigo

- Ampara District won the toss and elected to field.
- Milan Abeysekera, Nimanda Madushanka, Duvindu Tillakaratne (Ampara District) and Lisula Lakshan (Batticaloa District) all made their List A debuts.

18 March 2017
Scorecard

Tincomalee District; 197 (45.5 overs)	v	Ampara District; 204/6 (36.5 overs)
Achira Eranga 49 (82); Alankara Asanka Silva 3/33 (10 overs)		Shehan Fernando 85 (73); Shohan Rangika 4/28 (8.5 overs)

Ampara District won by 4 wickets (D/L method)
Army Ground, Panagoda
Umpires: Ravindra Kottahachchi and Saman Mohan de Silva

- Tincomalee District won the toss and elected to bat.
- Lakkana Jayasekera, Mahela Vijelath (Ampara District), Dimuth Warapitiya, Udayawansha Parakrama, Suminda Lakshan and Sanjaya Ranaweera (Tincomalee District) all made their List A debuts.

19 March 2017
Scorecard

Batticaloa District; 178 (47.4 overs)	v	Tincomalee District; 184/9 (41.3 overs)
Harsha Vithana 59* (114); Buddika Sandaruwan 3/32 (10 overs)		Roscoe Thattil 43 (95); Dinuka Hettiarachchi 3/39 (10 overs)

Tincomalee District won by 1 wicket
Burgher Recreation Club Ground, Colombo
Umpires: SH Sarathkumara and Lyndon Hannibal

- Batticaloa District won the toss and elected to bat.
- Udara Ranasinghe and Milan Rathnayake (Tincomalee District) both made their List A debuts.

22 March 2017
Scorecard

Batticaloa District; 290 (50 overs)	v	Ampara District; 207 (36.4 overs)
Tillakaratne Sampath 126 (98); Alankara Asanka Silva 3/38 (10 overs)		Saliya Saman 65 (52); Andy Solomons 2/16 (4 overs)

Batticaloa District won by 83 runs
Burgher Recreation Club Ground, Colombo
Umpires: Asanga Jayasooriya and Kitsiri Jayaweera

- Ampara District won the toss and elected to field.

25 March 2017
Scorecard

Ampara District; 219 (48.3 overs)	v	Tincomalee District; 221/8 (49.1 overs)
Vishva Wijeratne 59 (81); Roscoe Thattil 3/28 (6 overs)		Lahiru Sri Lakmal 95* (121); Savith Priyan 2/31 (10 overs)

Tincomalee District won by 2 wickets
Burgher Recreation Club Ground, Colombo
Umpires: Asanga Jayasooriya and Nilantha Semasinghe

- Ampara District won the toss and elected to bat.
- Nuwan Karunaratne, Shiran Ratnayake and Savith Priyan (Ampara District) all made their List A debuts.

26 March 2017
Scorecard

Batticaloa District; 196 (47.4 overs)	v	Tincomalee District; 202/7 (47.3 overs)
Bhanuka Rajapaksa 65 (86); Buddika Sandaruwan 4/32 (8.4 overs)		Dimuth Warapitiya 52 (83); Dinuka Hettiarachchi 4/28 (7.3 overs)

Tincomalee District won by 3 wickets
Burgher Recreation Club Ground, Colombo
Umpires: Chaminda Hathurusingha and Kitsiri Jayaweera

- Tincomalee District won the toss and elected to field.

=== Northern Group ===
15 March 2017
Scorecard

Jaffna District; 266/8 (38 overs)	v	Kilinochchi District; 176/4 (27 overs)
Dinuk Wikramanayaka 66 (53); Irosh Samarasooriya 2/51 (8 overs)		Milinda Siriwardana 80* (48); Jeevan Mendis 2/16 (5 overs)

Kilinochchi District won by 2 runs (D/L method)
Moors Sports Club Ground, Colombo
Umpires: Raveendra Wimalasiri and Maurice Zilva

- Kilinochchi District won the toss and elected to field.
- Sithara Gimhan, Pramod Madushan (Jaffna District) and Shehan Madushanka (Kilinochchi District) all made their List A debuts.

18 March 2017
Scorecard

Jaffna District; 318/8 (50 overs)	v	Vauniya District; 156 (33.2 overs)
Tharanga Paranavitana 101 (95); Manjula Jayawardhana 5/40 (5 overs)		Samith Dushantha 68 (67); Jeevan Mendis 5/41 (9.2 overs)

Jaffna District won by 162 runs
Colts Cricket Club Ground, Colombo
Umpires: Krishantha Rodrigo and Eric Kannangara

- Vauniya District won the toss and elected to field.
- Akila Lakshan, Tharindu Dilshan, Palitha Kumara, Kamal Pushpakumara, Gayantha Wijethilake and Kalyana Rathnapriya (Vauniya District) all made their List A debuts.

19 March 2017
Scorecard

Vauniya District; 173 (40.4 overs)	v	Kilinochchi District; 174/1 (34.4 overs)
Samith Dushantha 45 (48); Kasun Rajitha 3/44 (10 overs)		Harsha Cooray 108* (96); Suwanji Madanayake 1/23 (7 overs)

Kilinochchi District won by 9 wickets
Panadura Esplanade, Panadura
Umpires: Chaminda Hathurusingha and Prageeth Rambukwella

- Kilinochchi District won the toss and elected to field.
- Chanaka Devinda (Kilinochchi District), Sasindu Perera and Sanath Ranjan (Vauniya District) all made their List A debuts.

22 March 2017
Scorecard

Kilinochchi District; 157 (43 overs)	v	Jaffna District; 158/3 (27.1 overs)
Sangeeth Cooray 81 (123); Ramith Rambukwella 3/18 (10 overs)		Tharanga Paranavitana 79 (81); Geeth Kumara 1/8 (1 over)

Jaffna District won by 7 wickets
P Sara Oval, Colombo
Umpires: Ranmore Martinesz and Raveendra Wimalasiri

- Kilinochchi District won the toss and elected to bat.
- Ishara Prashan (Jaffna District) and T Gunaratne (Kilinochchi District) both made their List A debuts.

25 March 2017
Scorecard

Vauniya District; 136 (27.3 overs)	v	Jaffna District; 137/6 (20.2 overs)
Kamal Pushpakumara 29 (29); Ishara Prashan 4/29 (7.3 overs)		Ramith Rambukwella 36* (25); Asela Aluthge 4/57 (8 overs)

Jaffna District won by 4 wickets
Surrey Village, Maggona
Umpires: Krishantha Rodrigo and Seekkuge Sarathkumara

- Jaffna District won the toss and elected to field.
- Disnaka Manoj (Jaffna District) and L Jayasinghe (Vauniya District) both made their List A debuts.

27 March 2017
Scorecard

Vauniya District; 283/9 (50 overs)	v	Kilinochchi District; 279 (50 overs)
Akila Lakshan 79 (87); Suraj Randiv 2/35 (10 overs)		Harsha Cooray 126 (132); Manjula Jayawardene 3/42 (9.1 overs)

Vauniya District won by 4 runs
Burgher Recreation Club Ground, Colombo
Umpires: Saman Mohan de Silva and Susantha Dissanayake

- Vauniya District won the toss and elected to bat.
- Avishka Fernando, Harshika Fernando and Ruvith Karunaratne (Kilinochchi District) all made their List A debuts.

=== North Central Group ===
15 March 2017
Scorecard

Mannar District; 278/9 (50 overs)	v	Anuradhaura District; 208 (44 overs)
Roshen Silva 102* (123); Adeesha Nanayakkara 4/59 (10 overs)		Sachin Jayawardena 50* (72); Amila Aponso 3/28 (10 overs)

Mannar District won by 70 runs
Colts Cricket Club Ground, Colombo
Umpires: Deepal Gunawardene and Pradeep Udawatta

- Ubethilke Anuruddha, Malith de Silva, Nisal Francisco, Akeel Inham, Lahiru Jayakody and Vinodh Perera (Anuradhaura District) all made their List A debuts.

18 March 2017
Scorecard

Polonnaruwa District; 218/9 (50 overs)	v	Mannar District; 219/1 (36.2 overs)
Nipuna Gamage 54 (47); Chathura Peiris 2/23 (5 overs)		Lahiru Thirimanne 103* (108); Yohan de Silva 1/47 (10 overs)

Mannar District won by 9 wickets
Surrey Village, Maggona
Umpires: Palitha de Alwis and Kapil Kottahachchi

- Polonnaruwa District won the toss and elected to bat.
- Nipuna Gamage, Vihanga Kalhara, Dananja Madushanka, Tharindu Sriwardene, Risith Upamal and Sanka Wijegunaratne (Polonnaruwa District) all made their List A debuts.

21 March 2017
Scorecard

Anuradhaura District; 266 (50 overs)	v	Polonnaruwa District; 235 (50 overs)
Lahiru Jayakody 62 (48); Yohan de Silva 3/37 (10 overs)		Tharindu Sriwardene 64 (73); Malith de Silva 4/31 (10 overs)

Anuradhaura District won by 31 runs
Bloomfield Cricket and Athletic Club Ground, Colombo
Umpires: Dilshan de Silva and Ranjith Vishwakula

- Anuradhaura District won the toss and elected to bat.
- Thiran Dhanapala (Anuradhaura District), Chrishen Aponsu, Suresh Peiris, Geeth Perera and Chamod Silva (Polonnaruwa District) all made their List A debuts.

22 March 2017
Scorecard

Anuradhaura District; 170 (43.2 overs)	v	Mannar District; 171/2 (36.1 overs)
Adeesha Nanayakkara 54 (60); Udith Madushan 3/32 (7.2 overs)		Udara Jayasundera 94 (110); Taneesha Weerakoon 1/36 (8 overs)

Mannar District won by 8 wickets
Nondescripts Cricket Club Ground, Colombo
Umpires: Thilak Fernando and Rohitha Kottahachchi

- Mannar District won the toss and elected to field.
- Mohomad Akram, Lahiru Fernando, Sandun Rathnatunga, Chandimanthu Rodrigo, Taneesha Weerakoon (Anuradhaura District) and Udith Madushan (Mannar District) all made their List A debuts.

25 March 2017
Scorecard

Polonnaruwa District; 199 (50 overs)	v	Mannar District; 203/6 (39 overs)
Nipuna Gamage 47 (68); Udara Jayasundera 2/22 (5 overs)		Sameera de Zoysa 58 (65); Vihanga Kalhara 2/14 (5 overs)

Mannar District won by 4 wickets
Colts Cricket Club Ground, Colombo
Umpires: Gamini Dissanayake and Susantha Dissanayake

- Polonnaruwa District won the toss and elected to bat.
- Kushan Weerakkody (Mannar District) and Hasitha Nirmal (Polonnaruwa District) both made their List A debuts.

26 March 2017
Scorecard

Anuradhaura District; 249 (49.5 overs)	v	Polonnaruwa District; 110 (34.4 overs)
Adeesha Nanayakkara 51 (57); Yohan de Silva 3/24 (6 overs)		Yohan de Silva 29* (52); Nipun Karunanayake 3/19 (5.4 overs)

Anuradhaura District won by 139 runs
Navy Ground, Welisara
Umpires: Thilak Fernando and Nilantha Semasinghe

- Anuradhaura District won the toss and elected to bat.

=== North Western Group ===
15 March 2017
Scorecard

Puttalam District; 263 (49.2 overs)	v	Kegalle District; 266/2 (38 overs)
Shehan Jayasuriya 64 (62); Ishan Jayaratne 4/49 (10 overs)		Kusal Perera 161* (181); Isuru Udana 1/28 (5 overs)

Kegalle District won by 8 wickets
FTZ Sports Complex, Katunayake
Umpires: Gamini Dissanayake and Ravindra Kottahachchi

- Puttalam District won the toss and elected to bat.
- Madushan Ravichandrakumar (Kegalle District) made his List A debut.

18 March 2017
Scorecard

Puttalam District; 335 (47.2 overs)	v	Kurunegala District; 156 (33.2 overs)
Sachithra Serasinghe 91 (97); Darshana Mahawatte 3/39 (7 overs)		Ruwantha Ekanayake 64 (65); Malinda Pushpakumara 4/68 (8 overs)

Puttalam District won by 179 runs
FTZ Sports Complex, Katunayake
Umpires: Vidura Prasad and Keerthi Bandara

- Puttalam District won the toss and elected to bat.
- Dhanushka Dharmasiri, Malith Premathilake, Hashan Prabath, Ruwantha Ekanayake, Thilina Herath and Chaminda Pathirana (Kurunegala District) all made their List A debuts.

19 March 2017
Scorecard

Kurunegala District; 169 (34.4 overs)	v	Kegalle District; 173/2 (20.3 overs)
Dhanushka Dharmasiri 29 (16); Akila Dananjaya 3/12 (3.4 overs)		Kusal Perera 105 (61); Niyasdeen Ramathullah 1/22 (3 overs)

Kegalle District won by 8 wickets
Colts Cricket Club Ground, Colombo
Umpires: Deepal Gunawardene and WCC Rodrigo

- Kurunegala District won the toss and elected to bat.
- Mohamed Shiraz (Kegalle District), Damith Perera, Kalpa Bandaranayake and Niyasdeen Ramathullah (Kurunegala District) all made their List A debuts.

22 March 2017
Scorecard

Puttalam District; 252/8 (50 overs)	v	Kegalle District; 256/7 (43.2 overs)
Thikshila de Silva 59 (72); Ishan Jayaratne 3/46 (10 overs)		Sadeera Samarawickrama 74 (64); Asitha Fernando 2/25 (6 overs)

Kegalle District won by 3 wickets
Colts Cricket Club Ground, Colombo
Umpires: Dilshan de Silva and Ranganath Prasanna

- Puttalam District won the toss and elected to bat.
- Raveen Yasas (Puttalam District) made his List A debut.

23 March 2017
Scorecard

Kurunegala District; 178 (40.4 overs)	v	Kegalle District; 179/5 (37.3 overs)
Dhanushka Dharmasiri 34 (29); Prabath Jayasuriya 3/19 (9 overs)		Angelo Jayasinghe 53* (88); Ruwantha Ekanayake 2/34 (10 overs)

Kegalle District won by 5 wickets
Colts Cricket Club Ground, Colombo
Umpires: Pradeep Udawatta and Maurice Zilva

- Kegalle District won the toss and elected to field.
- Vishad Randika, Pasindu Isira, Salinda Ushan (Kegalle District) and Gayan Tharaka (Kurunegala District) all made their List A debuts.

25 March 2017
Scorecard

Kurunegala District; 180 (31.5 overs)	v	Puttalam District; 184/3 (36.3 overs)
Dhanushka Dharmasiri 57 (49); Rajitha Dilshan 3/16 (5 overs)		Raveen Yasas 71 (119); Gayan Tharaka 1/14 (2 overs)

Puttalam District won by 7 wickets
FTZ Sports Complex, Katunayake
Umpires: Chaminda Hathurusingha and Eric Kannangara

- Kurunegala District won the toss and elected to bat.
- Rajitha Dilshan, Romesh Krishantha and Dilshan Sanjeewa (Puttalam District) all made their List A debuts.

=== Southern Group ===
15 March 2017
Scorecard

Matara District	v	Galle District

Nondescripts Cricket Club Ground, Colombo

17 March 2017
Scorecard

Matara District; 385/9 (50 overs)	v	Hambantota District; 142 (38.1 overs)
Anuk Fernando 89* (43); Milroy Silva 4/61 (10 overs)		Pathum Nissanka 66 (79); Lahiru Kumara 3/16 (7 overs)

Matara District won by 243 runs
Bloomfield Cricket and Athletic Club Ground, Colombo
Umpires: Mohan de Silva and Upul Wewage

- Matara District won the toss and elected to bat.
- Asiri Bandara, Senal de Silva, Ashan Fernando, Shehan Hettiarachchi, Dulanga Lakmal, Pathum Nissanka, Milroy Silva, Ruchira Tharindra (Hambantota District), Lasith Ambuldeniya and Hashan Upendra (Matara District) all made their List A debuts.

19 March 2017
Scorecard

Galle District	v	Hambantota District

Surrey Village, Maggona

22 March 2017
Scorecard

Galle District; 130 (27.2 overs)	v	Matara District; 136/1 (17.3 overs)
Minhaj Jalill 32 (30); Shanmuganathan Shanugeeth 3/29 (6 overs)		Lahiru Udara 54* (56); Chalana de Silva 1/36 (6 overs)

Matara District won by 9 wickets
Army Ground, Panagoda
Umpires: Nilan De Silva and Ranjith Vishwakula

- Galle District won the toss and elected to bat.
- Nalin Perera (Galle District), Aravinda Akurugoda, Malinga Amarasinghe, Nimesh Bandara and Shanmuganathan Shanugeeth (Matara District) all made their List A debuts.

24 March 2017
Scorecard

Hambantota District; 84 (26.1 overs)	v	Matara District; 85/4 (15.4 overs)
Senal de Silva 30 (37); Malinga Amarasinghe 3/17 (6 overs)		Sandun Weerakkody 21 (13); Dimuthu Naveendra 2/30 (4 overs)

Matara District won by 6 wickets
Colombo Cricket Club Ground, Colombo
Umpires: Prageeth Rambukwella and Ranjith Vishwakula

- Hambantota District won the toss and elected to bat.
- Damidu Ashan, Buddika Janith, Dimuthu Naveendra and Rumesh Silva (Hambantota District) all made their List A debuts.

26 March 2017
Scorecard

Galle District; 354/5 (50 overs)	v	Hambantota District; 136 (32.1 overs)
Dilhan Cooray 139 (133); Shehan Hettiarachchi 2/43 (7 overs)		Dulip Gayan 34 (55); Shalika Karunanayake 3/28 (5 overs)

Galle District won by 218 runs
Surrey Village, Maggona
Umpires: Suranga Perera and Prageeth Rambukwella

- Galle District won the toss and elected to bat.
- Ruwan Herath, Thilan Nimesh, Eranga Rathnayake (Galle District), Sumeth Chandima, Lahiru Fernando and Dulip Gayan (Hambantota District) all made their List A debuts.

=== Uva Group ===
15 March 2017
Scorecard

Badulla District	v	Ratnapura District

Panadura Esplanade, Panadura

18 March 2017
Scorecard

Badulla District	v	Monaragala District

Panadura Esplanade, Panadura

19 March 2017
Scorecard

Ratnapura District	v	Monaragala District

Nondescripts Cricket Club Ground, Colombo

22 March 2017
Scorecard

Badulla District; 237 (49.2 overs)	v	Ratnapura District; 202 (46.4 overs)
Himasha Liyanage 60 (60); Shasheen Fernando 4/40 (10 overs)		Sajith Dissanayaka 46 (50); Seekkuge Prasanna 3/42 (9.4 overs)

Badulla District won by 35 run
Sinhalese Sports Club Ground, Colombo
Umpires: Saman Mohan de Silva and Sagara Kumara

- Badulla District won the toss and elected to bat.
- BAM Fernando, Himasha Liyanage, Ashan Randika (Badulla District), Sanjula Abeywickreme and Sajith Dissanayaka (Ratnapura District) all made their List A debuts.

25 March 2017
Scorecard

Monaragala District	v	Badulla District

Panadura Esplanade, Panadura

26 March 2017
Scorecard

Ratnapura District; 151 (36.5 overs)	v	Monaragala District; 157/6 (33.2 overs)
Maduranga Zoysa 38 (52); Chamikara Edirisinghe 4/42 (10 overs)		Harsha Rajapaksha 51 (63); Iwanka Sanjula 2/21 (4 overs)

Monaragala District won by 4 wickets
FTZ Sports Complex, Katunayake
Umpires: Nilan De Silva and Ranganath Prasanna

- Ratnapura District won the toss and elected to bat.
- Chalanaka Weerasinghe (Monaragala District) and Iwanka Sanjula (Ratnapura District) both made their List A debuts.

=== Western Group ===
15 March 2017
Scorecard

Colombo District	v	Kalutara District

Panadura Esplanade, Panadura

18 March 2017
Scorecard

Colombo District	v	Gampha District

Colombo Cricket Club Ground, Colombo

19 March 2017
Scorecard

Kalutara District	v	Gampha District

FTZ Sports Complex, Katunayake

22 March 2017
Scorecard

Kalutara District; 167 (36.5 overs)	v	Colombo District; 171/3 (33.1 overs)
Lasith Fernando 35 (40); Wanidu Hasaranga 5/22 (8.5 overs)		Ron Chandraguptha 70* (96); Gayan Sirisoma 3/58 (10 overs)

Colombo District won by 7 wickets
Colombo Cricket Club Ground, Colombo
Umpires: Kapil Kottahachchi and Maurice Zilva

- Colombo District won the toss and elected to field.
- Ranitha Liyanarachchi, Malindu Maduranga, Raveen Sayer (Colombo District), Sanjaya Chathuranga, Aruna Dharmasena, Madhawa Nimesh, Mohamed Shilmi and Mishen Silva (Kalutara District) all made their List A debuts.

25 March 2017
Scorecard

Gampha District	v	Colombo District

Colombo Cricket Club Ground, Colombo

26 March 2017
Scorecard

Gampha District	v	Kalutara District

Panadura Esplanade, Panadura

== Quarter finals ==
29 March 2017
Scorecard

Kegalle District; 148 (40.3 overs)	v	Badulla District; 73 (20.3 overs)
Hashan Dumindu 46 (75); Seekkuge Prasanna 3/29 (9.3 overs)		Himasha Liyanage 26 (27); Prabath Jayasuriya 4/8 (6.3 overs)

Kegalle District won by 75 runs
FTZ Sports Complex, Katunayake
Umpires: Prageeth Rambukwella and Pradeep Udawatta

- Kegalle District won the toss and elected to bat.
- Dilshan de Soysa (Badulla District) made his List A debut.

29 March 2017
Scorecard

Colombo District; 209 (46.2 overs)	v	Matara District; 106/5 (20 overs)
Madawa Warnapura 86 (123); Lahiru Kumara 4/21 (8.2 overs)		Sandun Weerakkody 51 (41); Vishwa Fernando 2/18 (5 overs)

Colombo District won by 10 runs (D/L method)
Colts Cricket Club Ground, Colombo
Umpires: Nilan De Silva and Deepal Gunawardene

- Matara District won the toss and elected to field.
- Thimira Jayasinghe (Matara District) made his List A debut.

29 March 2017
Scorecard

Kandy District; 273/7 (50 overs)	v	Jaffna District; 166 (27.4 overs)
Chamara Kapugedera 100* (111); Jeevan Mendis 3/47 (10 overs)		Ramith Rambukwella 47 (35); Kasun Madushanka 3/45 (7 overs)

Kandy District won by 107 runs
Colombo Cricket Club Ground, Colombo
Umpires: Gamini Dissanayake and Ravindra Kottahachchi

- Kandy District won the toss and elected to bat.

29 March 2017
Scorecard

Mannar District; 272/9 (50 overs)	v	Tincomalee District; 71 (18.4 overs)
Lahiru Thirimanne 74 (85); Shohan Rangika 3/55 (10 overs)		Suminda Lakshan 19 (15); Udara Jayasundera 4/15 (3.2 overs)

Mannar District won by 201 runs
Army Ground, Panagoda
Umpires: Asanga Jayasooriya and Rohitha Kottahachchi

- Tincomalee District won the toss and elected to field.

== Semi finals ==
31 March 2017
Scorecard

Kandy District; 96 (29 overs)	v	Kegalle District; 98/3 (20 overs)
Sachithra Senanayake 29 (38); Prabath Jayasuriya 3/17 (9 overs)		Hashan Dumindu 50* (56); Sachithra Senanayake 1/7 (5 overs)

Kegalle District won by 7 wickets
P Sara Oval, Colombo
Umpires: Deepal Gunawardene and Lyndon Hannibal

- Kandy District won the toss and elected to bat.

31 March 2017
Scorecard

Mannar District; 130 (37.1 overs)	v	Colombo District; 136/3 (27 overs)
Akshu Fernando 31 (60); Vishwa Fernando 3/23 (7.1 overs)		Malindu Maduranga 55 (43); Udith Madushan 2/32 (7 overs)

Colombo District won by 7 wickets
Nondescripts Cricket Club Ground, Colombo
Umpires: Prageeth Rambukwella and Raveendra Wimalasiri

- Mannar District won the toss and elected to bat.
- Shaluka Silva (Colombo District) made his List A debut.

== Final ==
2 April 2017
Scorecard

Colombo District; 295/6 (50 overs)	v	Kegalle District; 223 (47.4 overs)
Ashan Priyanjan 47 (39); Akila Dananjaya 3/75 (10 overs)		Angelo Jayasinghe 67 (87); Lakshan Sandakan 5/39 (10 overs)

Colombo District won by 72 runs
P Sara Oval, Colombo
Umpires: Ranmore Martinesz and Raveendra Wimalasiri

- Kegalle District won the toss and elected to field.
