= Ranasinghe =

Ranasinghe (Sinhala: රණසිංහ, romanized: Raṇasiṁha) is both a Sinhalese given name and a surname. Notable people with the name include:

== Given name ==
- Ranasinghe Premadasa (1924–1993), 3rd President of Sri Lanka from 1989 to 1993

== Surname ==
- Ajantha Ranasinghe (1940–2016), Sri Lankan journalist, lyricist, poet, and novelist
- Anne Ranasinghe (1925–2016), Sri Lankan English-language poet
- Anura Ranasinghe (1956–1998), Sri Lankan cricketer
- Arthur Ranasinghe (1898–1976), Sri Lankan civil servant and statesman
- Ashan Ranasinghe (born 1992), Sri Lankan cricketer
- Dhanushka Ranasinghe (born 1992), Sri Lankan cricketer
- Douglas Ranasinghe (born 1945), Sri Lankan actor
- Hemal Ranasinghe (born 1984), Sri Lankan actor
- Kavindu Ranasinghe (born 2001), Sri Lankan cricketer
- Keerthi Ranasinghe (born 1962), Sri Lankan cricketer
- Laddie Ranasinghe (1913–1983), Sri Lankan actor
- Lionel Ranasinghe (born 1962), Sri Lankan assassin of Vijaya Kumaratunga
- Nalinda Ranasinghe (born 1989), Sri Lankan cricketer
- Oliver Ranasinghe, former Commander of the Sri Lankan Air Force
- Oshadi Ranasinghe (born 1986), Sri Lankan cricketer
- Parinda Ranasinghe, Sri Lankan former judge and 38th Chief Justice of the Supreme Court
- Parinda Ranasinghe Jr., Sri Lankan lawyer and 49th Attorney General
- Piyadasa Ranasinghe (1946–1989), Sri Lankan political activist
- Roshan Ranasinghe (born 1975), Sri Lankan politician
- Sakvithi Ranasinghe, Sri Lankan English teacher
- Samantha Ranasinghe, Sri Lankan politician
- Sirimevan Ranasinghe, Sri Lankan admiral and former Commander of the Sri Lanka Navy
- Sumeda Ranasinghe (born 1991), Sri Lankan javelin thrower
- Sunethra Ranasinghe, Sri Lankan politician
- Thiwanka Ranasinghe (born 1992), Sri Lankan boxer
- Tissa Ranasinghe (1925–2019), Sri Lankan sculptor
- Tony Ranasinghe (1937–2015), Sri Lankan actor
- Udara Ranasinghe (born 1992), Sri Lankan cricketer
