= Lakmal =

Lakmal is a Sinhalese name. Notable people with the name include:

== Surname ==
- Chaturanga Lakmal (born 1988), Sri Lankan weightlifter
- Dulanga Lakmal (born 1991), Sri Lankan cricketer
- Lahiru Sri Lakmal (born 1989), Sri Lankan cricketer
- Suranga Lakmal (born 1987), Sri Lankan cricketer

== Forename ==
- Hasitha Lakmal de Silva (born 1991), Sri Lankan cricketer
- Sampath Lakmal de Silva (1988–2006), Sri Lankan journalist
- Lakmal Fernando (born 1980), Sri Lankan cricketer
- Lakmal Kasturiarachchige (born 1986), Sri Lanka born Austrian cricketer
- Lakmal Perera (born 1986), Ghanaian cricketer
