= Kalhara =

Kalhara (Sinhala: කල්හාර) is a Sri Lankan name that may refer to the following notable people:

Given name

- Kalhara Peiris, Sri Lankan cricketer
- Kalhara Senarathne (born 2000), Sri Lankan cricketer

Surname

- Kasun Kalhara (born 1981), Sri Lankan singer and musician
- Vihanga Kalhara (born 1993), Sri Lankan cricketer
