= Charith =

Charith is a given name. Notable people with the name include:

- Charith Asalanka (born 1997), Sri Lankan cricketer
- Charith Jayampathi (born 1991), Sri Lankan cricketer
- Charith Keerthisinghe (born 1985), Sri Lankan cricketer
- Charith Mendis (born 1995), Sri Lankan cricketer
- Charith Rajapakshe (born 1993), Sri Lankan cricketer
- Charith Senanayake (born 1962), Sri Lankan cricketer
- Charith Sudaraka (born 1995), Sri Lankan cricketer
- Charith Sylvester (born 1982), Sri Lankan cricketer
- Charith Tissera (born 1979), Sri Lankan cricketer
