= Maduranga =

Maduranga is both a given name and a surname. Notable people with the name include:

- Maduranga Zoysa (born 1984), Sri Lankan cricketer
- Kusal Maduranga (born 1993), Sri Lankan actor
- Malindu Maduranga (born 1997), Sri Lankan cricketer
- Tharindu Maduranga (born 1985), Sri Lankan cricketer
