= Kavinda =

Kavinda is a Sinhalese name that may refer to the following notable people:

Given name

- Kavinda Jayawardena, Sri Lankan politician
- Kavinda de Thissera, Sri Lankan cricketer

Surname

- Ashen Kavinda, Sri Lankan cricketer
- Nuwan Kavinda, Sri Lankan cricketer
