= Prashan =

Prashan is both a given name and a surname. Notable people with the name include:

- Prashan Wickramasinghe (born 1992), Sri Lankan cricketer
- Ishara Prashan (born 1996), Sri Lankan cricketer
- Thilan Prashan (born 1998), Sri Lankan cricketer
