= Gayantha =

Gayantha is a given name. Notable people with the name include:

- Gayantha Karunatileka (born 1962), Sri Lankan politician
- Gayantha Wijethilake (born 1982), Sri Lankan cricketer
