= Nalinda =

Nalinda is a given name. Notable people with the name include:

- Nalinda Jayatissa (born 1977), Sri Lankan politician
- Nalinda Ranasinghe (born 1989), Sri Lankan cricketer
