= Ramindu =

Ramindu is a given name. Notable people with the name include:

- Ramindu de Silva (born 1996), Sri Lankan cricketer
- Ramindu Nikeshala (born 1996), Sri Lankan cricketer
