= Sanjaya Ranaweera =

Sanjaya Ranaweera can refer to:

- Sanjaya Ranaweera (cricketer, born 1981), a Sri Lankan cricketer
- Sanjaya Ranaweera (cricketer, born 1986), a Sri Lankan cricketer
