= Nuwan Indika =

Nuwan Indika may refer to:

- Nuwan Indika (cricketer), a Sri Lankan cricketer
- Nuwan Indika (athlete), a Sri Lankan para sprinter and long jumper
