= Dimuthu =

Dimuthu is a given name. Notable people with the name include:

- Dimuthu Bandara Abayakoon (born 1971), Sri Lankan politician
- Dimuthu Naveendra (born 1988), Sri Lankan cricketer
