= Niyazov (surname) =

Niyazov or Niazov (f. Niyazova or Niazova, Russian: Ниязов, Tajik: Ниёзов, romanized: Niyozov, Turkmen: Nyýazow, Niýazowa) is a Russianized Central Asian (Kazakh, Uzbek, Bukhari Jewish, Tajiki, and Turkmen) family name. The meanings of the surname are in Persian or Bukhari. "Niyaz"/Niaz means: 1. Gift, 2. Wish, 3. compassion. The suffix "ov" means 's (Niaz's).

Notable people with the surname include:

- Atamyrat Nyýazow (1912–1942), Soviet Red Army soldier, father of Saparmyrat
- Abdul-Vahed Niyazov (b. 1969), Russian businessman
- Edige Niyazov (1940–2009), Kazakhstani artist
- Marat Nyýazow (1933–2009), Soviet and Turkmen sport shooter
- Muza Nyýazowa (b. 1938), wife of Saparmyrat
- Saparmyrat Nyýazow (1940–2006), Turkmen politician, president
- Tahmina Niyazova (b. 1989), Tajiki female singer
