= Rajitha (name) =

Rajitha is a given name and surname. Notable people with the name include:

== Given name ==
- Rajitha Amunugama (born 1969), former Sri Lankan cricketer
- Rajitha Dilshan (fl. 2017), Sri Lankan cricketer
- Rajitha Hiran (born 1981), Sri Lankan actor
- Rajitha Senaratne (born 29 May 1950), Sri Lankan dentist and politician
- Rajitha Ranaweera (born 1992), Sri Lankan cricketer.
- Rajitha Wickramarachchi (born 1987), Sri Lankan cricketer.

== Surname ==
- Kasun Rajitha (born 1993), Sri Lankan cricketer
