= Wijegunaratne =

Wijegunaratne is a surname. Notable people with the surname include:

- Ravindra Wijegunaratne (born 1962), Sri Lankan admiral
- Sanka Wijegunaratne (born 1983), Sri Lankan cricketer
