= Ravindu =

Ravindu is a Sri Lankan male given name.

Notable people with this name include:

- Ravindu Shah, Kenyan cricketer
- Ravindu Kodituwakku, Sri Lankan cricketer
- Ravindu Laksiri, Sri Lankan squash player
- Ravindu Sembukuttige, Sri Lankan cricketer
- Ravindu Tillakaratne, Sri Lankan cricketer
