= Sathyendra =

Sathyendra is both a given name and a surname. Notable people with the name include:

- Sathyendra Coomaraswamy (1919–1988), Sri Lankan cricketer
- S. Sathyendra, Indian actor
