= Harshika =

Harshika is a given name. Notable people with the name include:

- Harshika Fernando, Sri Lankan cricketer
- Harshika Poonacha, Indian actress
