= Gunathilake =

Gunathilake is a surname. Notable people with the surname include:

- Angeline Gunathilake (1939–2019), Sri Lankan singer
- Berty Gunathilake (1924–2022), Sri Lankan actor
- Kolitha Gunathilake, Sri Lankan fighter pilot
- Malith Gunathilake (born 1987), Sri Lankan cricketer
- Nandana Gunathilake (1962–2026), Sri Lankan politician, MP (2000–2010)
- Rookantha Goonatillake (born 1959), Sri Lankan singer
- Sanath Gunathilake (born 1955), Sri Lankan actor
- Santhush Gunathilake (born 1999), Sri Lankan cricketer
