= Dinidu =

Dinidu is both a given name and a surname. Notable people with the name include:

- Dinidu Marage (born 1981), Italian cricketer of Sri Lankan origin
- Krishan Dinidu (born 1990), Sri Lankan cricketer
