= Premathilake =

Premathilake is a surname. Notable people with the surname include:

- Malith Premathilake (born 1997), Sri Lankan cricketer
- Meemana Premathilake (1918–1965), Sri Lankan poet
