= Sandun Rathnatunga =

Sri Lankan cricketer (born 1990)

Personal information
- Born: 21 December 1990 (age 35); Gampaha, Sri Lanka
- Source: Cricinfo, 6 April 2017

Sandun Rathnatunga (born 21 December 1990) is a Sri Lankan cricketer. He made his List A debut for Anuradhaura District in the 2016–17 Districts One Day Tournament on 22 March 2017.
