= Sumeth Chandima =

Sri Lankan cricketer (born 1989)

Personal information
- Born: 18 August 1989 (age 37); Panadura, Sri Lanka
- Source: Cricinfo, 8 April 2017

Sumeth Chandima (born 18 August 1989) is a Sri Lankan cricketer. He made his List A debut for Hambantota District in the 2016–17 Districts One Day Tournament on 26 March 2017.
