= Sachith Dias =

Sri Lankan cricketer (born 1984)

Personal information
- Full name: Devamunige Sachith Arosha Dias
- Born: 17 November 1984 (age 41)
- Source: Cricinfo, 31 October 2017

Sachith Dias (born 17 November 1984) is a Sri Lankan cricketer. He played four first-class matches between 2013 and 2014. He made his first-class debut for Chilaw Marians Cricket Club in the 2012–13 Premier Trophy on 23 February 2013.

== See also ==
- List of Chilaw Marians Cricket Club players
