= Sajith Dissanayaka =

Sri Lankan cricketer (born 1989)

Personal information
- Born: 24 July 1989 (age 37); Panadura, Sri Lanka
- Source: Cricinfo, 9 April 2017

Sajith Dissanayaka (born 24 July 1989) is a Sri Lankan cricketer. He made his List A debut for Ratnapura District in the 2016–17 Districts One Day Tournament on 22 March 2017. He made his Twenty20 debut for Lankan Cricket Club in the 2017–18 SLC Twenty20 Tournament on 25 February 2018.

In September 2026, Dissanayaka was found guilty of assault and sentenced to one year and three months in prison. Part of the attack included pouring petrol over his female victim and threatening to set the house alight.
