= Malinga Surappulige =

Sri Lankan cricketer (born 1983)

Personal information
- Full name: Surappulige Dilan Chamikara Malinga
- Born: 8 August 1983 (age 43)
- Source: Cricinfo, 4 December 2017

Malinga Surappulige (born 8 August 1983) is a Sri Lankan cricketer. He played 63 first-class and 50 List A matches for multiple domestic sides in Sri Lanka between 2001 and 2013. He made his Twenty20 debut on 17 August 2004, for Panadura Sports Club in the 2004 SLC Twenty20 Tournament. His last first-class match was for Chilaw Marians Cricket Club in the 2012–13 Premier Trophy on 8 March 2013.

== See also ==
- List of Chilaw Marians Cricket Club players
