= Sagara Kumara =

Sri Lankan cricketer (born 1977)

Personal information
- Born: 24 January 1977 (age 49); Matara, Sri Lanka
- Source: Cricinfo, 9 April 2017

Sagara Kumara (born 24 January 1977) is a Sri Lankan cricketer. He played in 61 first-class matches between 1996 and 2007. He made his Twenty20 debut on 17 August 2004, for Tamil Union Cricket and Athletic Club in the 2004 SLC Twenty20 Tournament. He is now an umpire and stood in matches in the 2016–17 Districts One Day Tournament.
