= Manjula Priyantha =

Sri Lankan cricketer (born 1980)

Personal information
- Full name: Panawannage Manjula Priyantha
- Born: 15 October 1980 (age 46)
- Source: Cricinfo, 18 December 2017

Manjula Priyantha (born 15 October 1980) is a Sri Lankan cricketer. He played thirteen first-class and nineteen List A matches for multiple domestic sides in Sri Lanka between 2000 and 2009. His last first-class match was for Seeduwa Raddoluwa Cricket Club in the 2009–10 Premier Trophy on 18 December 2009.

== See also ==
- List of Chilaw Marians Cricket Club players
