= Dinesh Daminda =

Sri Lankan cricketer (born 1983)

Personal information
- Full name: Thawalampolage Dinesh Daminda Darshanapriya
- Born: 23 October 1983 (age 43)
- Source: Cricinfo, 31 October 2017

Dinesh Daminda (born 23 October 1983) is a Sri Lankan cricketer. He has played 47 first-class and 30 List A matches for several domestic sides in Sri Lanka since 2004. He made his Twenty20 debut on 17 August 2004, for Ragama Cricket Club in the 2004 SLC Twenty20 Tournament. His last first-class match was for Chilaw Marians Cricket Club in the 2012–13 Premier Trophy on 30 March 2013.

== See also ==
- List of Chilaw Marians Cricket Club players
