= Sanahasa Fernando =

Sri Lankan cricketer (born 1978)

Personal information
- Full name: Kiriwellage Nuwan Sanahasa Fernando
- Born: 27 June 1978 (age 48)
- Source: Cricinfo, 7 November 2017

Sanahasa Fernando (born 27 June 1978) is a Sri Lankan cricketer. He played 41 first-class and 33 List A matches for multiple domestic sides in Sri Lanka between 2001 and 2008. His last first-class match was for Lankan Cricket Club in the 2007–08 Premier Trophy on 22 February 2008.

== See also ==
- List of Chilaw Marians Cricket Club players
