= Palitha Kumara =

Sri Lankan cricketer (born 1981)

Personal information
- Born: 20 June 1981 (age 45); Wariyapola, Sri Lanka
- Source: Cricinfo, 5 April 2017

Palitha Kumara (born 20 June 1981) is a Sri Lankan cricketer. He made his List A debut for Vauniya District in the 2016–17 Districts One Day Tournament on 18 March 2017.
