= Savith Priyan =

Sri Lankan cricketer (born 1990)

Personal information
- Full name: Savith Priyan Weerasinghe
- Born: 14 November 1990 (age 35); Kalutara, Sri Lanka
- Source: ESPNcricinfo, 29 December 2016

Savith Priyan (born 14 November 1990) is a Sri Lankan cricketer. He made his first-class debut for Badureliya Sports Club in the 2016–17 Premier League Tournament on 28 December 2016. He made his List A debut for Ampara District in the 2016–17 Districts One Day Tournament on 25 March 2017. He made his Twenty20 debut for Badureliya Sports Club in the 2017–18 SLC Twenty20 Tournament on 24 February 2018.
