= Shehan Hettiarachchi =

Sri Lankan cricketer (born 1994)

Personal information
- Born: 15 January 1994 (age 32); Colombo, Sri Lanka
- Source: Cricinfo, 7 April 2017

Shehan Hettiarachchi (born 15 January 1994) is a Sri Lankan cricketer. He made his List A debut for Hambantota District in the 2016–17 Districts One Day Tournament on 17 March 2017.
