= Taneesha Weerakoon =

Sri Lankan cricketer (born 1996)

Personal information
- Born: 15 October 1996 (age 30); Colombo, Sri Lanka
- Source: ESPNcricinfo, 9 December 2016

Taneesha Weerakoon (born 15 October 1996) is a Sri Lankan cricketer. He made his first-class debut for Bloomfield Cricket and Athletic Club in the 2016–17 Premier League Tournament on 9 December 2016. He made his List A debut for Anuradhaura District in the 2016–17 Districts One Day Tournament on 22 March 2017.
