= Rukshan Shehan =

Sri Lankan cricketer (born 1995)

Personal information
- Full name: Mihidukulasooriya Anthony Rukshan Shehan Fernando
- Born: 15 May 1995 (age 31)
- Source: Cricinfo, 7 November 2017

Rukshan Shehan (born 15 May 1995) is a Sri Lankan cricketer. He made his first-class debut for Chilaw Marians Cricket Club in the 2012–13 Premier Trophy on 30 March 2013.

== See also ==
- List of Chilaw Marians Cricket Club players
