= Sanjaya Chathuranga =

Sri Lankan cricketer (born 1992)

Personal information
- Born: 22 May 1992 (age 34); Colombo, Sri Lanka
- Source: Cricinfo, 9 April 2017

Sanjaya Chathuranga (born 22 May 1992) is a Sri Lankan cricketer. He made his List A debut for Kalutara District in the 2016–17 Districts One Day Tournament on 22 March 2017. He made his Twenty20 debut for Badureliya Sports Club in the 2017–18 SLC Twenty20 Tournament on 24 February 2018.
