= Gajan Pathmanathan =

Sri Lankan cricketer

Personal information
- Full name: Gajanand Pathmanathan
- Born: 23 January 1954; Colombo, Western Province, Ceylon
- Died: 29 August 2012 (aged 58); Bethesda, Maryland, United States
- Batting: Right-handed
- Bowling: Leg break
- Relatives: Satyendra Coomaraswamy (Uncle); Devind Pathmanathan (nephew)

Domestic team information
- Years: Team
- 1975–1978: Oxford University
- 1983: Cambridge University

Career statistics
Competition	First-class	List A
Matches	44	14
Runs scored	1,553	99
Batting average	20.98	7.07
100s/50s	0/10	0/1
Top score	82	58
Balls bowled	30	0
Wickets	0	–
Bowling average	–	–
5 wickets in innings	–	–
10 wickets in match	–	–
Best bowling	–	–
Catches/stumpings	35/–	6/–
- Source: Cricinfo, 5 September 2019

Gajanand Pathmanathan (23 January 1954 – 29 August 2012) was a Sri Lankan first-class cricketer, active in Sri Lankan cricket prior to their elevation to Test status in 1982. He studied at the universities of Oxford and Cambridge, playing first-class cricket for both and becoming one of the few people to gain a blue for both. He worked for the World Bank from 1984 until his death in 2012.

== Early life, cricket and Oxford ==
Pathmanathan was born at Colombo, where he was educated at Royal College. He made his debut in List A one-day cricket for the Sri Lanka Board President's XI against the touring Marylebone Cricket Club at Colombo in February 1973. He followed this up by touring India with the Sri Lanka national cricket team the following month, during which he made his debut in first-class cricket against the Kerala Chief Minister's XI at Thiruvananthapuram, with Pathmanathan also featuring against Tamil Nadu. The following year he toured Pakistan with Sri Lanka, making one List A and five first-class appearances.

After leaving Royal College, he travelled to England to study agricultural and forest sciences at University College, Oxford. While studying at Oxford, he played first-class cricket for Oxford University from 1975 to 1978, making 28 appearances. Pathmanathan scored 1,099 runs in these 28 appearances, at an average of 22.42 and a high score of 82, one of eight half centuries he made for Oxford. In addition to playing first-class cricket for Oxford, he also made ten appearances for the Combined Universities cricket team in the Benson & Hedges Cup between 1975 and 1978. Returning to Sri Lanka after graduating, Pathmanathan played for the Sri Lanka Board President's XI against the touring West Indians in February 1979. He studied for his master's degree in the United States at Harvard University.

== Postgraduate studies and career ==
Sri Lanka gained Test status in 1982, but Pathmanathan did not pursue a career in cricket, with Pathmanathan returning to England in 1982 to study for a postgraduate degree at Darwin College, Cambridge. While studying at Cambridge, he played first-class cricket for Cambridge University in 1983, making seven appearances and scoring 263 runs, which included two half centuries. His time at Cambridge also coincided with his second spell playing for the Combined Services, with Pathmanathan making two List A appearances in the 1983 Benson & Hedges Cup. He generally struggled in one-day cricket, scoring 74 runs across twelve innings, with a high score of 58. He is one of the few people to gain a blue for both Oxford and Cambridge.

Pathmanathan did not complete his postgraduate studies at Cambridge as he was headhunted by the World Bank Group, joining in 1984 as a young professional. His first six years with the bank involved a variety of postings across Africa and Asia, before working primarily in India and Kenya between 1990 and 2002. From 2007 he was based in Washington, D.C. as the manager of the South Asia Sustainable Development Unit. He died following a short battle with pancreatic cancer in August 2012 at Bethesda, Maryland. He was survived by his wife and two daughters. His nephew, Devind Pathmanathan, and uncle, Satyendra Coomaraswamy, both played first-class cricket.
