= Jayan Jayawardene =

Sri Lankan cricketer (born 1983)

Personal information
- Full name: Jayan Hadlee Crishman Jayawardene
- Born: 24 December 1983 (age 42)
- Source: Cricinfo, 20 November 2017

Jayan Jayawardene (born 24 December 1983) is a Sri Lankan cricketer. He made his first-class debut for Chilaw Marians Cricket Club in the 2006–07 Premier Trophy on 8 December 2006.

== See also ==
- List of Chilaw Marians Cricket Club players
