= Shanmuganathan Shanugeeth =

Sri Lankan cricketer (born 1998)

Personal information
- Born: 28 February 1998 (age 28); Kandy, Sri Lanka
- Source: Cricinfo, 8 April 2017

Shanmuganathan Shanugeeth (born 28 February 1998) is a Sri Lankan cricketer. He made his List A debut for Matara District in the 2016–17 Districts One Day Tournament on 22 March 2017.
