= Rumesh Silva =

Sri Lankan cricketer (born 1987)

Personal information
- Born: 8 May 1987 (age 39); Kaluthara, Sri Lanka
- Source: Cricinfo, 8 April 2017

Rumesh Silva (born 8 May 1987) is a Sri Lankan cricketer. He made his List A debut for Hambantota District in the 2016–17 Districts One Day Tournament on 24 March 2017.
