= Sathik Nimalsha =

Sri Lankan cricketer (born 1996)

Personal information
- Full name: Palandage Sathik Nimalsha
- Born: 19 December 1996 (age 29); Ragama, Sri Lanka
- Batting: Right-handed
- Bowling: Right-arm fast medium
- Source: Cricinfo, 3 April 2017

Sathik Nimalsha (born 19 December 1996) is a Sri Lankan cricketer. He made his List A debut for Matale District in the 2016–17 Districts One Day Tournament on 24 March 2017. He made his Twenty20 debut for Sri Lanka Navy Sports Club in the 2017–18 SLC Twenty20 Tournament on 24 February 2018.
