= Milan Abeysekera =

Sri Lankan cricketer (born 1993)

Personal information
- Born: 30 November 1993 (age 32); Colombo, Sri Lanka
- Batting: Left-handed
- Role: Wicketkeeper batsman
- Source: Cricinfo, 4 April 2017

Milan Abeysekera (born 30 November 1993) is a Sri Lankan cricketer. He made his List A debut for Ampara District in the 2016–17 Districts One Day Tournament on 15 March 2017.
