= Milroy Silva =

Sri Lankan cricketer (born 1982)

Personal information
- Born: 12 October 1982 (age 44); Kalutara, Sri Lanka
- Source: Cricinfo, 7 April 2017

Milroy Silva (born 12 October 1982) is a Sri Lankan cricketer. He made his List A debut for Hambantota District in the 2016–17 Districts One Day Tournament on 17 March 2017.
