= Devind Pathmanathan =

Sri Lankan cricketer (born 1995)

Personal information
- Full name: Devind Wijendra Pathmanathan
- Born: 17 February 1995 (age 31); Colombo, Sri Lanka
- Source: Cricinfo, 24 February 2018

Devind Pathmanathan (born 17 February 1995) is a Sri Lankan cricketer. He made his Twenty20 debut for Kalutara Town Club in the 2017–18 SLC Twenty20 Tournament on 24 February 2018. His uncle, Gajan Pathmanathan, was a first-class cricketer.
