= Kalpa Bandaranayake =

Sri Lankan cricketer (born 1996)

Personal information
- Born: 26 April 1996 (age 30); Kurunegala, Sri Lanka
- Source: Cricinfo, 7 April 2017

Kalpa Bandaranayake (born 26 April 1996) is a Sri Lankan cricketer. He made his List A debut for Kurunegala District in the 2016–17 Districts One Day Tournament on 19 March 2017.
