= Pasindu Isira =

Sri Lankan cricketer

Personal information
- Full name: Pasindu Isira
- Source: Cricinfo, 7 April 2017

Pasindu Isira is a Sri Lankan cricketer. He made his List A debut for Kegalle District in the 2016–17 Districts One Day Tournament on 23 March 2017.
