= Sanath de Silva =

Sri Lankan cricketer (born 1989)

Personal information
- Full name: Santhiyagu Hewage Sanath Sameera de Silva
- Born: 5 February 1989 (age 37)
- Source: Cricinfo, 31 October 2017

Sanath de Silva (born 5 February 1989) is a Sri Lankan cricketer. He has played ten first-class and two List A matches for Chilaw Marians Cricket Club between 2011 and 2013. He made his first-class debut for Chilaw Marians Cricket Club in the 2011–12 Premier Trophy on 27 January 2012.

== See also ==
- List of Chilaw Marians Cricket Club players
