= Samantha Fernando =

Sri Lankan cricketer (born 1985)

Samantha Fernando (born Lankaaluge Samantha Fernando on 25 March 1985) is a Sri Lankan cricketer. He is a left-handed batsman and right-arm medium-pace bowler who played for Chilaw Marians Cricket Club. He was born in Chilaw.

Fernando made a single first-class appearance for the side, during the 2003–04 season, against Tamil Union. From the lower order, he scored 22 runs in the only innings in which he batted. Fernando bowled three overs during the match, conceding 11 runs. He also played in five List A matches in 2012, also for Chilaw Marians Cricket Club.

== See also ==
- List of Chilaw Marians Cricket Club players
