= Lassana Perera =

Sri Lankan cricketer (born 1984)

Personal information
- Born: 26 January 1984 (age 42); Panadura, Sri Lanka
- Source: Cricinfo, 17 March 2017

Lassana Perera (born 26 January 1984) is a Sri Lankan cricketer. He made his first-class debut for Chilaw Marians Cricket Club in the 2006–07 Premier Trophy on 10 November 2006.

== See also ==
- List of Chilaw Marians Cricket Club players
