= Iwanka Sanjula =

Sri Lankan cricketer (born 1997)

Personal information
- Full name: Pandigamage Ivanka Sanjula Gamage
- Born: 16 February 1997 (age 29); Galle, Sri Lanka
- Source: Cricinfo, 9 April 2017

Pandigamage Ivanka Sanjula Gamage (born 16 February 1997) is a Sri Lankan cricketer. He made his List A debut for Ratnapura District in the 2016–17 Districts One Day Tournament on 26 March 2017.
