= Niksy Ahmed =

Sri Lankan cricketer (born 1994)

Personal information
- Full name: Niswan Niksy Ahmed
- Born: 21 February 1994 (age 32); Ampara, Sri Lanka
- Source: Cricinfo, 27 October 2017

Niksy Ahmed (born 21 February 1994) is a Sri Lankan cricketer. He made his first-class debut for Chilaw Marians Cricket Club in the 2014–15 Premier Trophy on 13 February 2015. He also played three List A matches for Chilaw Marians Cricket Club in 2014.

== See also ==
- List of Chilaw Marians Cricket Club players
