= Kasun de Silva =

Sri Lankan cricketer (born 1990)

Personal information
- Born: 3 July 1990 (age 36); Galle, Sri Lanka
- Source: ESPNcricinfo, 2 December 2016

Kasun de Silva (born 3 July 1990) is a Sri Lankan cricketer. He made his first-class debut for Sri Lanka Army Sports Club in the 2016–17 Premier League Tournament on 2 December 2016. He made his Twenty20 debut for Sri Lanka Army Sports Club in the 2017–18 SLC Twenty20 Tournament on 24 February 2018. He made his List A debut for Sri Lanka Army Sports Club in the 2018–19 Premier Limited Overs Tournament on 6 March 2019.
