= Ryan Kern =

Sri Lankan cricketer (born 1989)

Personal information
- Full name: R S G Kern
- Born: 26 May 1989 (age 37); Colombo Sri Lanka
- Role: Allrounder

Domestic team information
- Years: Team
- 2006 to 2010: SSC
- 2010 to 2011: Airforce Sports Club
- Source: Cricinfo, 20 February 2008

Ryan Kern (born 26 May 1989) is a Sri Lankan cricketer. He made his List A debut on 2 December 2008 against Ragama CC and his first class debut on 18 February 2011 against Singha CC. His Twenty20 debut for Panadura Sports Club in the 2017–18 SLC Twenty20 Tournament on 1 March 2018.
