= Thushendra de Zoysa =

Sri Lankan cricketer (born 1978)

Personal information
- Full name: Demuni Thushendra de Zoysa
- Born: 29 November 1978 (age 47); Colombo, Sri Lanka
- Nickname: Thush
- Batting: Left Arm
- Bowling: Right Arm
- Source: Cricinfo, 31 October 2017

Thushendra de Zoysa (born 29 November 1978) is a Sri Lankan cricketer. He has played 18 first-class and 15 List A matches for several domestic sides in Sri Lanka since 2001/02. His last first-class match was for Burgher Recreation Club in the 2006–07 Premier Trophy on 23 February 2007.

== See also ==
- List of Chilaw Marians Cricket Club players
