= Dimuth Warapitiya =

Sri Lankan cricketer (born 1992)

Personal information
- Born: 1 April 1992 (age 34); Kandy, Sri Lanka
- Batting: Left-handed
- Bowling: Right arm Offbreak
- Source: Cricinfo, 4 April 2017

Dimuth Warapitiya (born 1 April 1992) is a Sri Lankan cricketer. He made his List A debut for Tincomalee District in the 2016–17 Districts One Day Tournament on 18 March 2017.
