= Mahela Vijelath =

Sri Lankan cricketer (born 1981)

Personal information
- Born: 5 September 1981 (age 45)
- Batting: Left-handed
- Bowling: Right-arm offbreak
- Source: Cricinfo, 1 June 2020

Mahela Vijelath (born 5 September 1981) is a Sri Lankan cricketer. He made his List A debut for Ampara District in the 2016–17 Districts One Day Tournament on 18 March 2017. He made his Twenty20 debut for Badureliya Sports Club in the 2017–18 SLC Twenty20 Tournament on 2 March 2018.
