= C. Coomaraswamy =

Ceylon Tamil civil servant and diplomat

Senator C. Coomaraswamy CCS
- செ. குமாரசுவாமி

Member of the Senate of Ceylon

Ceylonese High Commissioner to India
- In office 1950–1955
- Preceded by: A. Mahadeva
- Succeeded by: Edwin Wijeratne

Personal details
- Born: 25 August 1887
- Education: Jaffna Hindu College; Royal College, Colombo
- Profession: Civil servant
- Ethnicity: Ceylon Tamil

Chellappah Coomaraswamy CBE (Tamil: செல்லப்பா குமாரசுவாமி; born 25 August 1887) was a Ceylon Tamil civil servant, diplomat and member of the Senate of Ceylon.

== Early life and family ==
Coomaraswamy was born on 25 August 1887. He was the son of Chellappah from Aiyanarkoviladi. Coomaraswamy was educated at Jaffna Hindu College and Royal College, Colombo.

Coomaraswamy married Mankayatkarasi, daughter of Mudaliyar Sabapathy and Manicka Ammaiyar from Nallur. They had three sons (Rajendra, Mahendra and Satyendra) and one daughter (Sundareswari).

== Career ==
Coomaraswamy joined the Government Clerical Service after finishing his education. He was appointed to the civil service in 1910. He was Police Magistrate in Puttalam in 1913, District Judge and Registrar General. He served as District Judge in Jaffna in 1933 before becoming Government Agent for the Northern Province.

== Later life ==
After retirement Coomaraswamy was nominated to the Senate of Ceylon in 1947. He served as the Ceylonese High Commissioner in New Delhi between 1950 and 1955.
