= Nuwan Sameera =

Sri Lankan cricketer (born 1985)

Nuwan Sameera (born Kohumulla Arachchige Nuwan Sameera on 13 February 1985) is a Sri Lankan cricketer. He is a right-handed batsman and right-arm medium-pace bowler who plays for Saracens Sports Club. He was born in Panadura.

Sameera made his List A debut for the side against Bloomfield Cricket and Athletic Club in the 2009-10 Premier Limited Overs Tournament. Though he did not bat in the match, he bowled 4 overs, conceding 28 runs.
