= Nuwan Sampath =

Sri Lankan cricketer (born 1996)

Personal information
- Born: 22 June 1996 (age 30)
- Source: Cricinfo, 24 February 2018

Nuwan Sampath (born 22 June 1996) is a Sri Lankan cricketer. He made his Twenty20 debut for Sri Lanka Navy Sports Club in the 2017–18 SLC Twenty20 Tournament on 24 February 2018. He made his List A debut for Sri Lanka Navy Sports Club in the 2017–18 Premier Limited Overs Tournament on 11 March 2018.
