= Nuwan Sanjeewa =

Sri Lankan cricketer (born 1978)

Nuwan Sanjeewa (born Athukoralage Nuwan Sanjeewa on 1 June 1978) was a Sri Lankan cricketer. He was a right-handed batsman and right-arm bowler who played for Sri Lanka Air Force Sports Club. He was born in Colombo.

Sanjeewa made a single first-class appearance for the side, during the 2000–01 season, against Moors Sports Club. He scored 9 runs in the first innings from the middle order, and, when switched to the opening order in the second innings, scored 20 runs.
