= Niaz, Ardabil =

Niaz
- Location in Iran
- Coordinates: 38°23′57″N 47°23′31″E
- Country: Iran
- Province: Ardabil Province
- Time zone: UTC+3:30 (IRST)
  - Summer (DST): UTC+4:30 (IRDT)

Niaz is a village in the Ardabil Province of Iran.
