= Madhawa Nimesh =

Sri Lankan cricketer (born 1996)

Personal information
- Born: 5 February 1996 (age 30)
- Source: Cricinfo, 13 July 2020

Madhawa Nimesh (born 5 February 1996) is a Sri Lankan cricketer. He made his first-class debut for Panadura Sports Club in Tier B of the 2016–17 Premier League Tournament on 2 December 2016. He made his List A debut for Kalutara District in the 2016–17 Districts One Day Tournament on 22 March 2017.
