= Sanjaya Ranaweera (cricketer, born 1981) =

Sri Lankan cricketer (born 1981)

Personal information
- Full name: Rajapakse Rajakaruna Wasala Mudiyanselage Sanjaya Bandra Ranaweera
- Born: 13 May 1981 (age 45); Anuradhapura
- Batting: Left-handed
- Bowling: Left-arm medium fast
- Source: Cricinfo, 15 July 2020

Sanjaya Ranaweera (born 13 May 1981) is a Sri Lankan cricketer. He made his List A debut for Tincomalee District in the 2016–17 Districts One Day Tournament on 18 March 2017.
