= Sasindu Perera =

Sri Lankan cricketer (born 1993)

Personal information
- Born: 25 March 1993 (age 33); Panadura, Sri Lanka
- Source: Cricinfo, 4 April 2017

Sasindu Perera (born 25 March 1993) is a Sri Lankan cricketer. He made his first-class and List A debuts in the 1999/00 season.
