= Niazabad, Lorestan =

Niazabad نيازاباد
- Village
- Location within Iran
- Coordinates: 33°51′21″N 48°10′40″E
- Country: Iran
- Province: Lorestan
- County: Selseleh
- Bakhsh: Central
- Rural District: Doab

Population (2006)
  - Total: 128
- Time zone: UTC+3:30 (IRST)
  - Summer (DST): UTC+4:30 (IRDT)

Niazabad (Persian: نيازاباد, also Romanized as Nīāzābād and Neyāzābād; also known as Nīāz) is a village in Doab Rural District, in the Central District of Selseleh County, Lorestan Province, Iran. At the 2006 census, its population was 128, in 29 families.
