= Sathyendra Coomaraswamy =

Sri Lankan cricketer (1919–1988)

Satyendra Coomaraswamy

Personal information
- Born: 4 December 1919; Jaffna, Ceylon
- Died: 15 January 1988 (aged 68); Colombo, Sri Lanka
- Batting: Right-handed
- Bowling: Right-arm medium-pace
- Relatives: Chinnappah Coomaraswamy (father); Indrajit Coomaraswamy (nephew); Gajan Pathmanathan (nephew)

Career statistics
Competition	First-class
Matches	14
Runs scored	385
Batting average	15.40
100s/50s	0/1
Top score	57
Balls bowled	1408
Wickets	10
Bowling average	67.50
5 wickets in innings	0
10 wickets in match	0
Best bowling	4/81
Catches/stumpings	7/–
- Source: CricketArchive, 29 September 2017

Satyendra "Sathi" Coomaraswamy (1919 – 15 January 1988) was a Sri Lankan first-class cricketer in the 1940s and 1950s. He represented Ceylon in the days before it became Sri Lanka and attained Test status.

Coomaraswamy was born to Chinnappah Coomaraswamy, a civil servant and later Senator and his wife Mankayatkarasi. He was educated at Royal College, Colombo, where he played in the Royal-Thomian encounter. A middle-order batsman and leg-spinner, he played for the Tamil Union Club and made his début for Ceylon in the one-day match against the 1948 Australians, dismissing Neil Harvey and Ron Hamence with consecutive balls and finishing with four wickets.

Playing against John Goddard's West Indians in 1948-49, he scored 6 and 35 in Ceylon's first match and 57 and 41 not out in the second, but his single wicket in the West Indians' two innings cost 164 runs. In 1949-50 he toured Pakistan with the Ceylon team, captaining the team in one match. In 1950 and 1951 he led Ceylon in two matches against the Commonwealth XI. In 1950 he led Tamil Union to the club championship.

Coomaraswamy won Ceylon's championship at the 100 yard sprint. He was an honorary member of MCC. The Satyendra Coomaraswamy Memorial Prize is awarded at Royal College in his memory for a cricket, tennis and athletic coloursman qualifying to be a university science entrant.
