= Sakvithi Ranasinghe =

Sri Lankan fraudster

- Born: Abhaya Ranasinghe Arachchilage Chandana Weerakumara; 24 December 1972 (age 53); Battaramulla, Colombo, Sri Lanka
- Spouse(s): Subashini de Silva (m.1998); Kumari Anuradhani (m.2004)
- Parent: H.T.D Chandra Latha (mother)
- Website: https://sakvithiranasinghe.lk

Abhaya Ranasinghe Arachchilage Chandana Weerakumara; (Sinhala: සක්විති රණසිංහ), known as Sakvithi Ranasighe is a Sri Lankan English teacher who was convicted in multiple criminal cases relating to financial fraud and operating an illegal financial institution.

== Early life ==
Weerakumara was the youngest of the 5 children of single mother H.T.D Chandra Latha. He took his primary education at D. S. Senanayake College Colombo 7. Being the only child who was successful in education, Weerakumara started conducting English Language tuition in Rathmalana under the alias "Sakvithi Ranasighe". Within a short period of time, he became a famous English tutor in the island with the use of aggressive advertising campaigns and paid television programs. He used the controversial slogan "Mama iganweematama Upannemi" meaning "I was born to teach".

== Financial Scams ==
As a result of the fame and financial success gained from his teaching, in the year 2003, Sakvithi Ranasighe started a company called "S. R. Property Sharing Investment (Private) Limited" which claimed of giving attractive dividends for its depositors. Subsequently, Ranasinghe started another company called "Sakvithi Constructions" which was supposedly engaged in buying and selling of properties. Later, it was revealed that he was engaged in selling lands by making counterfeit land deeds. Based on numerous complains from the victims, on September 26, 2008, Sakvithi scam was busted by Central Bank following further investigations. On the same month, the Police has announced that Sakvithi Ranasinghe has fled the country to Chennai, India. Later, it was estimated that total of Rs.1,060 million belonging to 2,135 depositors was missing along with him.

== Arrest ==
In August 2010, Ranasinghe and his wife were arrested by Mirihana Police when he was disguised in Nawagamuwa. Criminal Investigation Department of Sri Lanka was carrying out the investigation and he was remanded by a Court ruling of Nugegoda Magistrate. Further investigations revealed that most of the money he swindled were spent while gambling in casinos such as MGM, Bellagio and Baylies regularly with his associates.

== Sentence ==
While trial for fraud is being carried out, on 30 January 2013 Ranasinghe pleaded guilty to bigamy. According to the case filed by the Sri Lanka Attorney General, Ranasinghe had married his first wife Subashini de Silva on 9 March 1998. At the same time he had married for the second time, Anuruddhika Kumari, and had two children by her. He was sentenced for two years rigorous imprisonment by the Colombo High Court.

In September 2022, Sakvithi Ranasinghe, who pleaded guilty to financial fraud, was sentenced to 22 years rigorous imprisonment suspended for 5 years by the Colombo High Court. The accused who pleaded guilty to 11 charges was sentenced two years for each charge. The Magistrate also imposed a fine of Rs. 275,000 on the accused. Meanwhile, the wife of Sakvithi Ranasinghe, who pleaded guilty to one charge was also sentenced to two years imprisonment suspended for five years and subjected to a fine of Rs. 25,000.

In December 2023 - Convicted financial fraudster Sakvithi Ranasinghe and his wife were fined Rs. 1.8 million each by the Colombo High Court, after the duo pleaded guilty to charges of financial fraud.The Colombo High Court Judge further ordered that they be sentenced to 24 months of rigorous imprisonment, in the event that they fail to pay the relevant fine

In May 2025 - Sakvithi Ranasinghe and his wife were sentenced each to one year of rigorous imprisonment, suspended for 10 years, and imposed a fine of Rs. 25,000 per individual for operating an illegal financial institution and collecting public deposits totaling over Rs. 164.1 million. It was revealed in court that nearly 60% of the defrauded amount—about Rs. 98 million—has already been repaid to depositors in Rs. 5 million monthly instalments since July 2023, under an agreement between the plaintiff and defence counsel.
