= Thilan Nimesh =

Sri Lankan cricketer (born 1997)

Personal information
- Born: 29 November 1997 (age 28); Colombo, Sri Lanka
- Source: Cricinfo, 8 April 2017

Thilan Nimesh (born 29 November 1997) is a Sri Lankan cricketer. He made his List A debut for Galle District in the 2016–17 Districts One Day Tournament on 26 March 2017. Prior to his List A debut, he was part of Sri Lanka's squad for the 2016 Under-19 Cricket World Cup.
