= Malindu Maduranga =

Sri Lankan cricketer (born 1997)

Personal information
- Born: 11 October 1997 (age 29); Colombo, Sri Lanka
- Batting: Right-handed
- Role: Wicket-keeper
- Source: ESPNcricinfo, 31 January 2017

Malindu Maduranga (born 11 October 1997) is a Sri Lankan cricketer. He studied at Mahanama College. He made his first-class debut for Colombo Cricket Club in the 2016–17 Premier League Tournament on 28 January 2017. He made his List A debut for Colombo District in the 2016–17 Districts One Day Tournament on 22 March 2017. He made his Twenty20 debut for Colombo Cricket Club in the 2017–18 SLC Twenty20 Tournament on 1 March 2018. In November 2021, he was selected to play for the Colombo Stars following the players' draft for the 2021 Lanka Premier League.
