= Vihanga Kalhara =

Sri Lankan cricketer (born 1993)

Personal information
- Born: 21 April 1993 (age 33); Matara, Sri Lanka
- Source: Cricinfo, 5 April 2017

Vihanga Kalhara (born 21 April 1993) is a Sri Lankan cricketer. He made his List A debut for Polonnaruwa District in the 2016–17 Districts One Day Tournament on 18 March 2017. He made his Twenty20 debut for Kalutara Town Club in the 2017–18 SLC Twenty20 Tournament on 24 February 2018.
