= Sanka Wijegunaratne =

Sri Lankan cricketer (born 1983)

Personal information
- Born: 21 September 1983 (age 43); Kalutara, Sri Lanka
- Source: Cricinfo, 5 April 2017

Sanka Wijegunaratne (born 21 September 1983) is a Sri Lankan cricketer. He made his List A debut for Polonnaruwa District in the 2016–17 Districts One Day Tournament on 18 March 2017.
