= Rajitha Dilshan =

Sri Lankan cricketer

Personal information
- Full name: Rajitha Dilshan
- Source: Cricinfo, 7 April 2017

Rajitha Dilshan is a Sri Lankan cricketer. He made his List A debut for Puttalam District in the 2016–17 Districts One Day Tournament on 25 March 2017.
