= Niaz, West Azerbaijan =

Niaz نياز
- Village
- Location within Iran
- Coordinates: 39°09′00″N 44°36′36″E
- Country: Iran
- Province: West Azerbaijan
- County: Chaldoran
- Bakhsh: Central
- Rural District: Baba Jik

Population (2006)
  - Total: 53
- Time zone: UTC+3:30 (IRST)
  - Summer (DST): UTC+4:30 (IRDT)

Niaz (Persian: نياز, also Romanized as Nīāz) is a village in Baba Jik Rural District, in the Central District of Chaldoran County, West Azerbaijan Province, Iran. At the 2006 census, its population was 53, in 11 families.
