= Ravindu Kodituwakku =

Sri Lankan cricketer (born 1997)

Personal information
- Born: 13 October 1997 (age 29)
- Source: Cricinfo, 17 December 2017

Ravindu Kodituwakku (born 13 October 1997) is a Sri Lankan cricketer. He made his first-class debut for Tamil Union Cricket and Athletic Club in the 2017–18 Premier League Tournament on 15 December 2017. Prior to his first-class debut, he scored 119 runs from 129 balls in an under-19 match for S. Thomas' College, Mount Lavinia in February 2017.

He made his Twenty20 debut for Tamil Union Cricket and Athletic Club in the 2017–18 SLC Twenty20 Tournament on 1 March 2018. He made his List A debut for Tamil Union Cricket and Athletic Club in the 2017–18 Premier Limited Overs Tournament on 12 March 2018.
