= Sahan Wijesiri =

Sri Lankan cricketer (born 1988)

Sahan Wijesiri (full name Mudiyanselage Sahan Manjitha Wijesiri; born 9 January 1988) is a Sri Lankan cricketer. He is a right-handed batsman and wicket-keeper who plays for Lankan Cricket Club. He was born in Colombo.

Wijesiri, who has played with the Under-23s team since 2006, made his first-class debut for Lankan CC in November 2008. He is a lower-middle order batsman.
