= Malith Gunathilake =

Sri Lankan cricketer (born 1987)

Personal information
- Full name: Dushan Malith Gunathilake
- Born: 29 March 1987 (age 39)
- Source: Cricinfo, 10 November 2017

Malith Gunathilake (born 29 March 1987) is a Sri Lankan cricketer. He played 22 first-class and 13 List A matches for multiple domestic sides in Sri Lanka between 2008 and 2013. His last first-class match was for Colombo Cricket Club in the 2012–13 Premier Trophy on 30 March 2013.

== See also ==
- List of Chilaw Marians Cricket Club players
