= Nimesh Bandara =

Sri Lankan cricketer (born 1997)

Personal information
- Born: 27 December 1997 (age 28); Colombo, Sri Lanka
- Source: Cricinfo, 8 April 2017

Nimesh Bandara (born 27 December 1997) is a Sri Lankan cricketer. He made his List A debut for Matara District in the 2016–17 Districts One Day Tournament on 22 March 2017.
