= Krishan Dinidu =

Sri Lankan cricketer (born 1990)

Krishan Dinidu (full name Rankoth Gedara Krishan Dinidu Dananjaya; born 3 June 1990) is a Sri Lankan cricketer. He is a right-handed batsman and right-arm medium-fast bowler who plays for Panadura Sports Club. He was born in Panadura.

Having represented the Under-23 team since the 2005 season, he made his List A debut during the 2009–10 season, against Sri Lanka Air Force Sports Club. From the upper-middle order, he scored 19 not out.

He made his Twenty20 debut for Panadura Sports Club in the 2017–18 SLC Twenty20 Tournament on 24 February 2018.
