= Dulanga Lakmal =

Sri Lankan cricketer (born 1991)

Personal information
- Born: 1 August 1991 (age 35); Colombo, Sri Lanka
- Source: Cricinfo, 7 April 2017

Dulanga Lakmal (born 1 August 1991) is a Sri Lankan cricketer. He made his List A debut for Hambantota District in the 2016–17 Districts One Day Tournament on 17 March 2017.
