= Niaz Morshed (Dhaka cricketer) =

Bangladeshi cricketer (born 1983)

Neaz Morshed
Personal information
- Full name: Neaz Morshed Nahid
- Born: 28 February 1983 (age 43)
- Batting: Right-handed
- Bowling: Right-arm medium fast

Domestic team information
- Years: Team
- 2004/05–2008/09: Dhaka Division
- 2005/06: Chittagong Division
- FC debut: 24 February 2005 Dhaka Division v Khulna Division
- Last FC: 10 October 2008 Dhaka Division v Chittagong Division
- LA debut: 15 February 2005 Dhaka Division v Barisal Division
- Last LA: 19 January 2009 Dhaka Division v Barisal Division

Career statistics
Competition	First-class	List A
Matches	4	11
Runs scored	4	13
Batting average	1.00	6.50
100s/50s	0/0	0/0
Top score	4	7*
Balls bowled	438	576
Wickets	7	12
Bowling average	25.57	27.75
5 wickets in innings	0	0
10 wickets in match	0	0
Best bowling	3/23	4/24
Catches/stumpings	0/–	1/–
- Source: CricketArchive, 10 December 2016

Neaz Morshed Nahid is a first-class and List A cricketer from Bangladesh. A right-arm fast-medium bowler, he is sometimes referred to on scoresheets by his nickname Nahid and played for Dhaka Division in 2004/05. He took 3 for 23 against Rajshahi Division in one of his two first-class games and 4 for 24 against Khulna Division in a limited overs match. He also went toe-to-toe against Virat Kohli in the ICC Cricket World Cup 2011.
