= Harshika Fernando =

Sri Lankan cricketer

Personal information
- Full name: Harshika Fernando
- Source: Cricinfo, 5 April 2017

Harshika Fernando is a Sri Lankan cricketer. He made his List A debut for Kilinochchi District in the 2016–17 Districts One Day Tournament on 27 March 2017.
