= Niaz, Kurdistan =

Niaz نياز
- Village
- Location within Iran
- Coordinates: 35°24′52″N 47°31′02″E
- Country: Iran
- Province: Kurdistan
- County: Dehgolan
- Bakhsh: Central
- Rural District: Yeylan-e Shomali

Population (2006)
  - Total: 381
- Time zone: UTC+3:30 (IRST)
  - Summer (DST): UTC+4:30 (IRDT)

Niaz (Persian: نياز, also Romanized as Nīāz, Neyāz, and Nīyāz) is a village in Yeylan-e Shomali Rural District, in the Central District of Dehgolan County, Kurdistan Province, Iran. At the 2006 census, its population was 381, in 86 families. The village is populated by Kurds.
