= Ramindu Nikeshala =

Sri Lankan cricketer (born 1996)

Personal information
- Born: 16 July 1996 (age 30)
- Source: Cricinfo, 25 February 2018

Ramindu Nikeshala (born 16 July 1996) is a Sri Lankan cricketer. He made his Twenty20 debut for Badureliya Sports Club in the 2017–18 SLC Twenty20 Tournament on 25 February 2018.
