= Ishara Prashan =

Sri Lankan cricketer (born 1996)

Personal information
- Born: 2 January 1996 (age 30); Hambantota, Sri Lanka
- Source: Cricinfo, 14 March 2017

Ishara Prashan (born 2 January 1996) is a Sri Lankan cricketer. He made his first-class debut for Tamil Union Cricket and Athletic Club in the 2015–16 Premier League Tournament on 8 January 2016. He made his List A debut for Jaffna District in the 2016–17 Districts One Day Tournament on 22 March 2017.
