= Niyasdeen Ramathullah =

Sri Lankan cricketer (born 1993)

Personal information
- Born: 22 October 1993 (age 33); Kandy, Sri Lanka
- Source: Cricinfo, 7 April 2017

Niyasdeen Ramathullah (born 22 October 1993) is a Sri Lankan cricketer. He made his List A debut for Kurunegala District in the 2016–17 Districts One Day Tournament on 19 March 2017.
