= Ranesh Perera =

Sri Lankan cricketer (born 1985)

Personal information
- Born: 11 October 1985 (age 41); Colombo, Sri Lanka
- Source: Cricinfo, 17 March 2017

Ranesh Perera (born 11 October 1985) is a Sri Lankan cricketer. He made his Twenty20 debut on 17 August 2004, for Colts Cricket Club in the 2004 SLC Twenty20 Tournament. He made his first-class debut for Ragama Cricket Club in the 2005–06 Premier Trophy on 16 December 2005.
