= Malith Premathilake =

Sri Lankan cricketer (born 1997)

Personal information
- Born: 21 February 1997 (age 29); Kandy, Sri Lanka
- Source: Cricinfo, 7 April 2017

Malith Premathilake (born 21 February 1997) is a Sri Lankan cricketer. He made his List A debut for Kurunegala District in the 2016–17 Districts One Day Tournament on 18 March 2017. He made his Twenty20 debut for Kurunegala Youth Cricket Club in the 2017–18 SLC Twenty20 Tournament on 25 February 2018.
