= Udara Ranasinghe =

Sri Lankan cricketer (born 1992)

Personal information
- Born: 27 April 1992 (age 34)
- Batting: Right-handed
- Bowling: Right arm offbreak
- Role: Allrounder
- Source: Cricinfo, 14 March 2018

Udara Ranasinghe (born 27 April 1992) is a Sri Lankan cricketer. He made his List A debut for Tincomalee District in the 2016–17 Districts One Day Tournament on 19 March 2017.
