= Tharindu Maduranga =

Sri Lankan cricketer (born 1985)

Personal information
- Born: 9 June 1985 (age 41)
- Source: Cricinfo, 19 February 2019

Tharindu Maduranga (born 9 June 1985) is a Sri Lankan cricketer. He made his Twenty20 debut for Panadura Sports Club in the 2017–18 SLC Twenty20 Tournament on 24 February 2018. He made his List A debut for Panadura Sports Club in the 2017–18 Premier Limited Overs Tournament on 10 March 2018.
