= Lakmal Fernando =

Sri Lankan cricketer (born 1980)

Personal information
- Full name: Lakmal Laleendra Fernando
- Born: 5 December 1980 (age 45); Colombo
- Source: Cricinfo, 7 November 2017

Lakmal Fernando (born 5 December 1980) is a Sri Lankan cricketer. He played seventeen first-class and twelve List A matches for multiple domestic sides in Sri Lanka between 2000 and 2004. His last first-class match was for Moors Sports Club in the 2003–04 Premier Trophy on 13 February 2004.

== See also ==
- List of Chilaw Marians Cricket Club players
