= Kushan Weerakkody =

Sri Lankan cricketer (born 1994)

Personal information
- Full name: Kushan Weerakkody
- Born: 4 January 1994 (age 32)
- Source: Cricinfo, 6 April 2017

Kushan Weerakkody (born 4 January 1994) is a Sri Lankan cricketer. He made his List A debut for Mannar District in the 2016–17 Districts One Day Tournament on 25 March 2017.
