= Nuwan Karunaratne =

Sri Lankan cricketer (born 1994)

Personal information
- Born: 1 February 1994 (age 32); Anuradhapura, Sri Lanka
- Source: Cricinfo, 19 March 2017

Nuwan Karunaratne (born 1 February 1994) is a Sri Lankan cricketer. He made his first-class debut for Ragama Cricket Club in the 2014–15 Premier Trophy on 16 January 2015. He made his List A debut for Ampara District in the 2016–17 Districts One Day Tournament on 25 March 2017.
