= Charith Sylvester =

Sri Lankan cricketer (born 1982)

Charith Sylvester Fernando (born 30 December 1982) in Badulla is a Sri Lankan first class cricketer. Debuting in 2001, Sylvester is a left-handed wicket-keeper batsman. He made his Twenty20 debut on 17 August 2004, for Sinhalese Sports Club in the 2004 SLC Twenty20 Tournament.

== See also ==
- List of Chilaw Marians Cricket Club players
