= Nuwan Priyankara =

Sri Lankan cricketer (born 1976)

Personal information
- Full name: Amarasinghe Mudalige Nuwan Priyankara
- Born: 10 December 1976 (age 49)
- Source: Cricinfo, 18 December 2017

Nuwan Priyankara (born 10 December 1976) is a Sri Lankan cricketer. He played four first-class matches for Chilaw Marians Cricket Club in 2001.

== See also ==
- List of Chilaw Marians Cricket Club players
