= Kalhara Peiris =

Sri Lankan cricketer

Personal information
- Full name: Kalhara Peiris
- Source: Cricinfo, 3 April 2017

Kalhara Peiris is a Sri Lankan cricketer. He made his List A debut for Matale District against Nuwara Eliya District in the 2016–17 Districts One Day Tournament on 24 March 2017.
