= Dimuthu Naveendra =

Sri Lankan cricketer (born 1988)

Personal information
- Full name: Thelge Dimuthu Naveendra Peiris
- Born: 23 July 1988 (age 38); Panadura, Sri Lanka
- Source: Cricinfo, 8 April 2017

Dimuthu Naveendra (born 23 July 1988) is a Sri Lankan cricketer. He made his List A debut for Hambantota District in the 2016–17 Districts One Day Tournament on 24 March 2017.
