= Gayantha Wijethilake =

Sri Lankan cricketer (born 1982)

Personal information
- Born: 18 April 1982 (age 44); Bandaragama, Sri Lanka
- Source: Cricinfo, 4 April 2017

Gayantha Wijethilake (born 18 April 1982) is a Sri Lankan cricketer. He made his List A debut for Vauniya District in the 2016–17 Districts One Day Tournament on 18 March 2017.
