= Nelum Kumara =

Sri Lankan cricketer (born 1979)

Personal information
- Born: 12 March 1979 (age 47)
- Source: Cricinfo, 14 March 2018

Nelum Kumara (born 12 March 1979) is a Sri Lankan cricketer. He made his first-class debut for Lankan Cricket Club in the 2005–06 Premier Trophy on 14 January 2006.
