= Qalʽeh-ye Niaz =

Qalʽeh-ye Niaz قلعه نیاز
- Location in Afghanistan
- Coordinates: 35°1′N 64°0′E
- Country: Afghanistan
- Province: Badghis Province
- Time zone: + 4.30

Qalʽeh-ye Niaz (Persian: قلعه نیاز) is a village in Badghis Province in north western Afghanistan.
