= Navantha Rathnayake =

Sri Lankan cricketer (born 1979)

Personal information
- Born: 9 February 1979 (age 47)
- Source: Cricinfo, 14 March 2018

Navantha Rathnayake (born 9 February 1979) is a Sri Lankan cricketer. He made his first-class debut for Sri Lanka Army Sports Club in the 2006–07 Premier Trophy on 17 November 2006.
