= Nalinda Ranasinghe =

Sri Lankan cricketer (born 1989)

Nalinda Ranasinghe (born 20 July 1989) is a Sri Lankan cricketer. He is a right-handed batsman and right-arm medium-fast bowler who plays for Singha Sports Club. He was born in Galle.

Ranasinghe made his List A debut during the 2009-10 Premier Limited Overs tournament against Lankan Cricket Club. He scored 26 runs on his debut, the second highest score on the Singha team.
