= List of Chilaw Marians Cricket Club players =

List of first-class cricketers by club

This is an incomplete list in alphabetical order of cricketers who have played for Chilaw Marians Cricket Club in top-class (Note: Top-class matches are first-class, List A, and Twenty20.) matches since the club initially achieved first-class status in 2001.

== Key ==
- † preceding a player's name means that the original article is now a redirect to this list.

== A ==
- Lasith Abeyratne (2010–11) : L. Abeyratne
- A. M. C. D. Abeysinghe (2018–19)
- Vidura Adikari (2012–13 to 2022–23) : A. K. V. Adikari
- Niksy Ahmed (2014–15) : N. N. Ahmed
- Ali Khan (2012–13) : Ali Khan
- Geeth Alwis (2013–14) : W. G. R. K. Alwis
- A. Anand (2022)
- Anuj Jotin (2022 to 2022–23)
- Chandana Aravinda (2004–05 to 2006–07) : S. D. C. Aravinda
- N. H. Atharagalla (2018–19 to 2021–22)
- Amal Athulathmudali (2007–08 to 2011–12) : D. N. A. Athulathmudali

== B ==
- M. A. T. S. Bandara (2012–13)
- Scott Borthwick (2014–15) : S. G. Borthwick
- M. L. R. Buddika (2019–20 to 2021–22)

== C ==
- Manoj Chanaka (2003–04 to 2006–07) : P. U. M. Chanaka
- Harsha Cooray (2006–07 to 2018–19) : N. H. G. Cooray
- D. L. S. Croospulle (2019–20 to 2021–22)

== D ==
- Rohit Damodaran (2013–14 to 2017–18) : R. Damodaran
- Dinesh Daminda (2012–13) : T. D. D. Darshanapriya
- W. R. K. S. Darshika (2019–20)
- Gayan de Silva (2014–15) : K. T. G. T. de Silva
- Sanath de Silva (2012–13) : S. H. S. S. de Silva
- Thikshila de Silva (2014–15 to 2022–23) : S. N. T. de Silva
- Chalana de Silva (2014–15 to 2017–18) : W. C. de Silva
- Thushendra De Zoysa (2001–02 to 2002–03) : D. T. de Zoysa
- Ranil Dhammika (2003–04 to 2004–05) : D. G. R. Dhammika
- Sachith Dias (2012–13) : D. S. A. Dias
- M. R. P. U. Dias (2017–18 to 2018–19)
- G. K. Dilhara (2022 to 2022–23)

== E ==
- Shaminda Eranga (2006–07 to 2011–12) : R. M. S. Eranga

== F ==
- A. H. A. Fernando (2022 to 2022–23)
- Asitha Fernando (2016–17 to 2020) : A. M. Fernando
- B. O. P. Fernando (2017–18 to 2020)
- Charith Sylvester (2001 to 2012–13) : C. S. Fernando
- Upul Fernando (2012–13 to 2014–15) : E. F. M. U. Fernando
- F. V. Fernando (2015–16)
- Dinusha Fernando (2012–13) : K. A. D. M. Fernando
- Hasantha Fernando (2002–03 to 2007–08) : K. H. R. K. Fernando
- Sanahasa Fernando (2004–05) : K. N. S. Fernando
- Lakmal Fernando (2001–02) : L. L. Fernando
- Samantha Fernando (2003–04 to 2012–13) : L. S. Fernando
- Akshu Fernando (2015–16) : M. A. P. Fernando
- Rukshan Shehan (2013–14 to 2017–18) : M. A. R. S. Fernando
- Damian Fernando (2002–03) : M. G. D. C. Fernando
- Sanjaya Fernando (2012–13) : M. S. D. Fernando
- N. N. Fernando (2020–21)
- P. S. U. Fernando (2017–18)
- Shasheen Fernando (2014–15 to 2015–16) : P. S. W. Fernando
- W. K. I. Fernando (2017–18 to 2022–23)
- W. R. D. Fernando (2018–19)
- N. A. Francisco (2018–19)

== G ==
- Malintha Gajanayake (2003–04 to 2005–06) : M. K. Gajanayake
- Chaminda Gamage (2014–15 to 2018–19) : C. Gamage
- Lahiru Gamage (2013–14 to 2015–16) : P. L. S. Gamage
- B. H. I. T. Gaminda (2022–23)
- Akalanka Ganegama (2015–16) : W. C. A. Ganegama
- S. C. Ghadigaonkar (2019–20)
- R. V. Gomez (2017–18 to 2018–19)
- S. M. Gugale (2022–23)
- Janaka Gunaratne (2001 to 2011–12) : L. J. P. Gunaratne
- Malith Gunathilake (2008–09 to 2011–12) : D. M. Gunathilake
- Amila Gunawardene (2001 to 2002–03) : A. Gunawardene
- D. M. N. D. Gunawardene (2017–18)
- Kanchana Gunawardene (2013–14 to 2014–15) : K. D. Gunawardene

== H ==
- Thanura Halambage (2015–16) : T. D. Halambage
- H. M. C. U. Herath (2012–13)
- Dinuka Hettiarachchi (2005–06 to 2015–16) : D. Hettiarachchi

== I ==
- Imraz Raffi (2011–12 to 2014–15) : M. R. M. Imraz
- Nuwan Indika (2003–04) : P. K. N. Indika
- Upul Indrasiri (2013–14) : S. A. D. U. Indrasiri

== J ==
- M. R. Jaleel (2013–14)
- Arosh Janoda (2009–10 to 2016–17) : J. G. A. Janoda
- Ansley Jansze (2007–08 to 2012–13) : A. P. Jansze
- G. A. Jathar (2022 to 2022–23)
- W. M. C. Jayampathi (2022)
- H. Jayasekera (2022)
- Angelo Jayasinghe (2012–13) : A. J. A. D. Jayasinghe
- Chinthaka Jayasinghe (2003–04) : C. U. Jayasinghe
- Asela Jayasinghe (2012–13) : K. A. S. Jayasinghe
- H. Jayasundera (2014–15)
- Akila Jayasundera (2012–13) : J. M. A. B. Jayasundera
- Praneth Jayasundera (2001 to 2007–08) : J. M. P. C. Jayasundera
- Shehan Jayasuriya (2016–17 to 2020) : G. S. N. F. Jayasuriya
- Prabath Jayasuriya (2012–13) : N. G. R. P. Jayasuriya
- D. K. R. C. Jayatissa (2018–19)
- Jayan Jayawardene (2006–07) : J. H. C. Jayawardene
- Saliya Saman (2013–14 to 2015–16) : P. A. S. S. Jeewantha

== K ==
- K. R. M. D. Kaluarachchi (2006–07)
- Ravindra Karunaratne (2009–10) : M. L. R. Karunaratne
- Umesh Karunaratne (2011–12 to 2013–14) : T. M. U. S. Karunaratne
- Navin Kavikara (2012–13) : N. M. Kavikara (List A only)
- Nuwan Kavinda (2012–13) : G. T. H. N. Kavinda
- Charith Keerthisinghe (2006–07) : D. C. B. Keerthisinghe
- Chanaka Komasaru (2014–15) : N. C. Komasaru
- Y. B. Kothari (2019–20)
- L. R. Krishantha (2012–13 to 2020–21)
- Geeth Kumara (2010–11 to 2013–14) : H. G. Kumara
- S. A. C. Kumara (2018–19 to 2020–21)

== L ==
- W. W. W. L. Lakshan (2022–23)
- Tharanga Lakshitha (2003–04) : A. B. T. Lakshitha
- A. K. K. Y. Lanka (2018–19)
- Maduka Liyanapathiranage (2009–10 to 2016–17) : M. A. Liyanapathiranage

== M ==
- Malinga Surappulige (2012–13) : S. D. C. Malinga
- Dinidu Marage (2001–02 to 2002–03) : D. A. Marage
- Nisham Mazahir (2012–13) : M. N. Mazahir
- A. Melayil (2019–20)
- P. H. K. D. Mendis (2019–20 to 2021–22)
- S. T. Mendis (2020–21)
- Ishan Mutaliph (2001–02 to 2005–06) : T. M. I. Mutaliph

== N ==
- K. D. Nandey (2018–19)
- A. Z. Nazar (2021–22)
- Suresh Niroshan (2004–05 to 2011–12) : W. A. S. Niroshan
- Dhammika Niroshana (2003–04) : H. D. Niroshana
- K. Nuwantha (2022 to 2022–23)

== P ==
- Ruchira Palliyaguruge (2001–02 to 2003–04) : R. S. A. Palliyaguruge
- J. S. Pande (2021–22)
- J. Pandey (2021–22)
- Sachith Pathirana (2012–13) : S. S. Pathirana
- B. H. V. C. Peiris (2021–22 to 2022–23)
- Chinthaka Perera (2002–03 to 2011–12) : G. A. C. R. Perera
- Dammika Perera (2001 to 2005–06) : L. D. I. Perera
- Isuru Perera (2005–06 to 2006–07) : M. A. I. M. Perera
- Dilruwan Perera (2004–05) : M. D. K. Perera
- Nimesh Perera (2003–04 to 2009–10) : M. M. D. N. Perera
- Nimesh Perera (cricketer, born 1982) (2001 to 2018–19) : N. A. N. N. Perera
- R. M. N. T. Perera (2012–13)
- Arosha Perera (2001 to 2005–06) : W. A. D. A. Perera
- Lassana Perera (2006–07) : W. L. R. Perera
- K. T. G. D. Prasad (2022)
- H. S. M. Prasanna (2022)
- S. N. N. K. Premaratne (2022–23)
- L. H. M. P. Premasinghe (2012–13)
- Nuwan Priyankara (2001) : A. M. N. Priyankara
- Manjula Priyantha (2006–07) : P. M. Priyantha
- Damith Priyadharshana (2012–13) : R. M. D. P. Punchibandara
- R. Punchihewa (2022–23)
- Malinda Pushpakumara (2009–10 to 2017–18) : P. M. Pushpakumara
- Shashrika Pussegolla (2013–14 to 2014–15) : P. G. C. S. Pussegolla

== R ==
- K. A. S. N. Rajaguru (2015–16)
- Bhanuka Rajapaksa (2015–16) : P. B. B. Rajapaksa
- R. A. C. M. Rajapaksa (2014–15 to 2015–16)
- K. C. B. D. Rajapakshe (2017–18)
- K. J. Rakesh (2018–19)
- Gayan Wijekoon (2003–04 to 2011–12) : W. M. G. Ramyakumara
- S. K. C. Randunu (2018–19)
- R. M. N. Ratnayake (2013–14)
- Rizwan Akbar (2012–13)
- Indika Ruwanpura (2001) : T. M. I. Ruwanpura

== S ==
- J. T. Samaratunga (2001–02)
- W. B. H. Samarawickrame (2013–14)
- J. M. C. Sandaru (2022 to 2022–23)
- D. Sanjeewa (2018–19 to 2022–23)
- L. P. M. Sathyapala (2001 to 2002–03)
- W. D. S. J. Senanayake (2007–08)
- D. A. Seneviratne (2017–18 to 2022–23)
- Sachithra Serasinghe (2016–17 to 2017–18) : S. C. Serasinghe
- M. A. R. Shehan (2012–13)
- K. R. P. Silva (2008–09)
- M. N. V. Silva (2018–19 to 2020)
- S. D. Silva (2020–21 to 2022–23)
- S. H. M. Silva (2007–08 to 2008–09)
- W. A. A. M. Silva (2015–16 to 2017–18)
- K. A. D. J. Siriwardene (2001–02 to 2002–03)
- Milinda Siriwardene (2007–08 to 2011–12) : T. A. M. Siriwardene
- Sohail Ahmed (2012–13)

== T ==
- D. H. A. P. Tharanga (2017–18 to 2022–23)
- H. C. Tharindu (2020–21 to 2022–23)
- P. A. Theekshana (2020–21 to 2022–23)
- S. T. Tittagalla (2001 to 2006–07)

== U ==
- Isuru Udana (2016–17 to 2017–18) : I. Udana
- Mahela Udawatte (2005–06 to 2016–17) : M. L. Udawatte
- S. P. Udeshi (2018–19 to 2019–20)

== W ==
- W. H. T. Wanniarchchi (2012–13)
- Malinda Warnapura (2015–16) : B. S. M. Warnapura
- M. Weerasinghe (2003–04)
- G. R. L. Weerasuriya (2020–21)
- Lahiru Weragala (2009–10 to 2011–12) : L. A. Weragala
- P. P. Wickramasinghe (2001–02 to 2002–03)
- K. G. K. W. Wickremasinghe (2021–22 to 2022)
- K. N. Wijenayake (2022)
- Sahan Wijeratne (2003–04 to 2014–15) : M. S. R. Wijeratne
- W. M. S. N. Wijesekera (2001)
- Sahan Wijesiri (2012–13) : M. S. M. Wijesiri
- Omesh Wijesiriwardene (2002–03 to 2004–05) : O. L. A. Wijesiriwardene

== Y ==
- Raveen Yasas (2016–17 to 2022–23) : U. R. Yasas
