= Lahiru Sri Lakmal =

Sri Lankan cricketer (born 1989)

Personal information
- Full name: Madduma Wellalage Lahiru Sri Lakmal
- Born: 5 May 1989 (age 37); Colombo, Sri Lanka
- Batting: Right-handed
- Bowling: Slow left-arm Orthodox
- Role: Allrounder
- Source: Cricinfo, 4 April 2017

Lahiru Sri Lakmal (born 5 May 1989) is a Sri Lankan cricketer. He made his first-class debut for Bloomfield Cricket and Athletic Club in the 2009–10 Premier Trophy on 27 November 2009.
