= Nuwan Kavinda =

Sri Lankan cricketer (born 1992)

Personal information
- Full name: Gardiwasam Thuiya Hennadige Nuwan Darshana Kavinda
- Born: 22 July 1992 (age 34)
- Source: Cricinfo, 4 December 2017

Nuwan Kavinda (born 22 July 1992) is a Sri Lankan cricketer. He made his first-class debut for Saracens Sports Club in the 2011–12 Premier Trophy on 20 January 2012.

== See also ==
- List of Chilaw Marians Cricket Club players
