= Nuwan Indika (cricketer) =

Sri Lankan cricketer (born 1985)

Personal information
- Full name: Paliwatthe Kankanamage Nuwan Indika
- Born: 13 November 1985 (age 40)
- Source: Cricinfo, 20 November 2017

Nuwan Indika (born 13 November 1985) is a Sri Lankan cricketer. He made his first-class debut for Chilaw Marians Cricket Club in the 2003–04 Premier Trophy on 16 January 2004.

== See also ==
- List of Chilaw Marians Cricket Club players
