= 2015–16 AIA Premier T20 Tournament =

Sri Lankan Twenty20 cricket tournament

- Dates: 22 December 2015 – 24 January 2016
- Administrator: Sri Lanka Cricket
- Cricket format: Twenty20
- Tournament format: Round-robin then knockout
- Champions: Sri Lanka Army

The 2015–16 AIA Premier T20 Tournament was a Twenty20 cricket tournament that was held in Sri Lanka. It was played between domestic teams in Sri Lanka, with the tournament starting on 22 December 2015 and concluding on 24 January 2016.

Following the conclusion of the group stage, Nondescripts Cricket Club, Tamil Union Cricket and Athletic Club, Sri Lanka Army Sports Club and Sinhalese Sports Club progressed to the semi-finals. Sri Lanka Army won the tournament, after they beat Tamil Union Cricket and Athletic Club by five wickets in the final.

== Fixtures ==
=== Group stage ===
==== Group A ====
22 December 2015
Scorecard

Badureliya Sports Club; 149/9 (20 overs)	v	Chilaw Marians Cricket Club; 104 (17 overs)
Nadeera Nawela 38 (28); Saliya Saman 3/19 (4 overs)		Lahiru Gamage 25 (16); Sahan Wijeratne 5/21 (4 overs)

Badureliya Sports Club won by 45 runs
R. Premadasa Stadium, Colombo
Umpires: S. H. Sarathkumara and Rohitha Kottahachchi

- Badureliya Sports Club, elected to bat first
- Shanaka Shaninda and Sachin Peiris (Badureliya Sports Club) made their T20 debuts.

22 December 2015
Scorecard

Colombo Cricket Club; 164/8 (20 overs)	v	Tamil Union Cricket and Athletic Club; 148 (16.2 overs)
Hasitha Wickramasinghe 34 (29); Dhananjaya de Silva 2/10 (2 overs)		Ramith Rambukwella 70 (30); Thilan Thushara 3/8 (3.2 overs)

Colombo Cricket Club won by 16 runs
P. Sara Oval, Colombo
Umpires: Ravindra Kottahachchi and Nilan De Silva

- Colombo Cricket Club, elected to bat first
- Imal Liyanage and Chamika Karunaratne (Tamil Union); Nisham Mazahir and Akila Jayasundera (Colombo Cricket Club) made their T20 debuts.

22 December 2015
Scorecard

Colts Cricket Club; 122/9 (20 overs)	v	Sri Lanka Ports Authority Cricket Club; 125/2 (17.1 overs)
Akila Dananjaya 22 (27); Chaminda Bandara 3/24 (4 overs)		Harsha Rajapaksha 66 (62); Chathupama Gunasinghe 1/22 (3 overs)

Sri Lanka Ports Authority won by 8 wickets
P. Sara Oval, Colombo
Umpires: Ravindra Kottahachchi and Asanga Jayasooriya

- Colts Cricket Club, elected to bat first
- Aruna Dharmasena, Pasindu Lakshanka, Sahan Arachchige, Charith Sudaraka, (Colts Cricket Club); Kanishka Perera, Harsha Rajapaksha and A. K. V. Tyrone (Sri Lanka Ports Authority Cricket Club) made their T20 debuts.

5 January 2016
Scorecard

Sri Lanka Army Sports Club; 133/8 (20 overs)	v	Badureliya Sports Club; 129/8 (20 overs)
Seekkuge Prasanna 33 (17); Dulanjana Mendis 3/30 (4 overs)		Nadeera Nawela 66 (62); Janith Silva 3/22 (4 overs)

Sri Lanka Army won by 4 runs
R. Premadasa Stadium, Colombo
Umpires: S. H. Sarathkumara and Raveendra Wimalasiri

- Sri Lanka Army Sports Club, elected to bat first
- Pathum Dilshan (Sri Lanka Army Sports Club); Yashan Samarasinghe (Badureliya Sports Club) made their T20 debuts.

5 January 2016
Scorecard

Colombo Cricket Club; 148/9 (20 overs)	v	Sri Lanka Ports Authority Cricket Club; 149/7 (16.5 overs)
Sachith Pathirana 48 (25); Madushanka Ekanayake 3/21 (4 overs)		Prashan Wickramasinghe 39 (32); Lakshan Sandakan 4/35 (4 overs)

Sri Lanka Ports Authority Cricket Club won by 3 wickets
P. Sara Oval, Colombo
Umpires: Asanga Jayasooriya and Nilan De Silva

- Colombo Cricket Club, elected to bat first

5 January 2016
Scorecard

Chilaw Marians Cricket Club; 153/8 (20 overs)	v	Colts Cricket Club; 154/7 (19.4 overs)
Thikshila de Silva 48 (16); Prabath Jayasuriya 2/12 (4 overs)		Hashan Dumindu 44 (45); Lahiru Gamage 3/24 (4 overs)

Colts Cricket Club won by 3 wickets
R. Premadasa Stadium, Colombo
Umpires: Deepal Gunawardene and Raveendra Wimalasiri

- Chilaw Marians Cricket Club, elected to bat first
- Fabian Fernando and Thanura Halambage (Chilaw Marians Cricket Club); Nipuna Kariyawasam (Colts Cricket Club) made their T20 debuts.

6 January 2016
Scorecard

Sri Lanka Army Sports Club; 205/8 (20 overs)	v	Colombo Cricket Club; 78 (15.5 overs)
Shalika Karunanayake 87* (39); Thilan Thushara 2/27 (4 overs)		Nisham Mazahir 21 (25); Chatura Damith 3/22 (4 overs)

Sri Lanka Army Sports Club won by 127 runs
P. Sara Oval, Colombo
Umpires: Nilan De Silva and Ruchira Palliyaguruge

- Colombo Cricket Club, elected to field first

6 January 2016
Scorecard

Badureliya Sports Club; 170/6 (20 overs)	v	Sri Lanka Ports Authority Cricket Club; 168/9 (20 overs)
Geshan Wimaladharma 73 (42); Anuk de Alwis 2/25 (3 overs)		Gihan Rupasinghe 49 (36); Sachin Peiris 4/22 (4 overs)

Badureliya Sports Club won by 2 runs
Nondescripts Cricket Club Ground, Colombo
Umpires: SH Sarathkumara and Ravindra Kottahachchi

- Badureliya Sports Club, elected to bat first
- Sachin Hewawasam (Bandureliya Sports Club) made his T20 debut.

6 January 2016
Scorecard

Tamil Union Cricket and Athletic Club; 204/9 (20 overs)	v	Colts Cricket Club; 126/4 (13.4 overs)
Dhananjaya de Silva 62 (34); Dilruwan Perera 4/30 (4 overs)		Sadeera Samarawickrama 46 (32); Jeevan Mendis 2/24 (3.4 overs)

Tamil Union won by 7 runs (D/L method)
Nondescripts Cricket Club Ground, Colombo
Umpires: Ranmore Martinesz and Ravindra Kottahachchi

- Colts Cricket Club, elected to field first
- Sanka Ramesh (Colts Cricket Club); and Sithara Gimhan and Ishara Prashan (Tamil Union) made their T20 debuts

12 January 2016
Scorecard

Chilaw Marians Cricket Club; 228/9 (20 overs)	v	Colombo Cricket Club; 205/6 (20 overs)
Saliya Saman 75 (33); Andy Solomons 3/40 (4 overs)		Lasith Abeyratne 56 (33); Maduka Liyanapathiranage 2/31 (3 overs)

Chilaw won by 23 runs
Colts Cricket Club Ground, Colombo
Umpires: Kapil Kottahachchi and Lyndon Hannibal

- Colombo Cricket Club, elected to field first

12 January 2016
Scorecard

Badureliya Sports Club; 131/9 (20 overs)	v	Tamil Union Cricket and Athletic Club; 132/1 (10 overs)
Hasantha Fernando 38 (29); Pramod Madushan 3/17 (4 overs)		Dhananjaya de Silva 81 (34); Mithun Jayawickrama 1/32 (3 overs)

Tamil Union won by 9 wickets
Nondescripts Cricket Club Ground, Colombo
Umpires: Gamini Dissanayake and Asanga Jayasooriya

- Tamil Union, elected to field first
- Pramod Madushan (Tamil Union Cricket and Athletic Club); and Sahan Adeesha (Badureliya Sports Club) made their T20 debuts

12 January 2016
Scorecard

Sri Lanka Army; 159/7 (20 overs)	v	Colts Cricket Club; 162/3 (16 overs)
Asela Gunaratne 52 (36); Akila Dananjaya 2/26 (4 overs)		Shehan Fernando 75 (39); Asela Gunaratne 1/18 (3 overs)

Colts Cricket Club won by 9 wickets
Nondescripts Cricket Club Ground, Colombo
Umpires: Pradeep Udawatta and Asanga Jayasooriya

- Sri Lanka Army, elected to bat first

13 January 2016
Scorecard

Badureliya Sports Club; 153 (19.1 overs)	v	Colombo Cricket Club; 154/4 (13.3 overs)
Sachin Hewawasam 58 (38); Thilan Thushara 3/21 (4 overs)		Chathuranga Kumara 65* (31); Sahan Adeesha 2/44 (3 overs)

Colombo Cricket Club won by 6 wickets
Nondescripts Cricket Club Ground, Colombo
Umpires: Lyndon Hannibal and Ruchira Palliyaguruge

- Badureliya Sports Club, elected to bat first
- Usman Ishak (Colombo Cricket Club) made his T20 debut

12 January 2016
Scorecard

Chilaw Marians Cricket Club; 134 (19.5 overs)	v	Sri Lanka Army; 95 (18 overs)
Ashen Silva 58 (36); Seekkuge Prasanna 3/32 (3.5 overs)		Asela Gunaratne 22 (29); Dinuka Hettiarachchi 4/20 (3 overs)

Chilaw won by 39 runs
R. Premadasa Stadium, Colombo
Umpires: Raveendra Wimalasiri and Nilan De Silva

- Sri Lanka Army, elected to field first

13 January 2016
Scorecard

Sri Lanka Ports Authority Cricket Club; 176/6 (20 overs)	v	Tamil Union Cricket and Athletic Club; 182/3 (18.4 overs)
Yohan Chanuka 41 (31); Ramith Rambukwella 2/29 (4 overs)		Dhananjaya de Silva 77* (52); Gihan Rupasinghe 2/30 (3.4 overs)

Tamil Union won by 7 wickets
Nondescripts Cricket Club Ground, Colombo
Umpires: Kapil Kottahachchi and Lyndon Hannibal

- Sri Lanka Army, elected to field first
- Yohan Chanuka (Sri Lanka Ports Authority Cricket Club) made his T20 debut

20 January 2016
Scorecard

Colts Cricket Club; 163/9 (20 overs)	v	Badureliya Sports Club; 147/8 (20 overs)
Priyamal Perera 43 (36); Shanaka Shaninda 3/27 (4 overs)		Hasantha Fernando 52* (34); Mohamed Ali 2/14 (4 overs)

Colts won by 16 runs
Nondescripts Cricket Club Ground, Colombo
Umpires: Gamini Dissanayake and Prageeth Rambukwella

- Badureliya Sports Club, elected to field first
- Mohamed Ali (Colt Cricket Club) made his T20 debut

20 January 2016
Scorecard

Sri Lanka Ports Authority Cricket Club; 150/8 (20 overs)	v	Sri Lanka Army; 153/4 (16.2 overs)
Gayan Maneeshan 35 (32); Ajantha Mendis 2/26 (4 overs)		Manjula de Zoysa 42 (39); Shanuka Dissanayake 1/22 (4 overs)

Sri Lanka Army Sports won by 6 wickets
P. Sara Oval, Colombo
Umpires: Ranmore Martinesz and Ravindra Kottahachchi

- Sri Lanka Ports Authority Cricket Club, elected to bat first

20 January 2016
Scorecard

Chilaw Marians Cricket Club; 209/8 (20 overs)	v	Tamil Union Cricket and Athletic Club; 211/8 (19.4 overs)
Saliya Saman 78 (49); Suranga Lakmal 5/34 (4 overs)		Pulina Tharanga 49* (30); Charith Rajapaksa 3/34 (4 overs)

Tamil Union won by 2 wickets
Nondescripts Cricket Club Ground, Colombo
Umpires: Gamini Dissanayake and Pradeep Udawatta

- Tamil Union Cricket and Athletic Club, elected to field first

21 January 2016
Scorecard

Colts Cricket Club; 226/5 (20 overs)	v	Colombo Cricket Club; 223/6 (20 overs)
Hashan Dumindu 60 (32); Thilan Thushara 2/36 (4 overs)		Roshan Anurudda 67* (32); Prabath Jayasuriya 2/32 (4 overs)

Colts won by 3 runs
Nondescripts Cricket Club Ground, Colombo
Umpires: Gamini Dissanayake and Nilan De Silva

- Colombo Cricket Club, elected to field first

21 January 2016
Scorecard

Sri Lanka Ports Authority Cricket Club; 151/8 (20 overs)	v	Chilaw Marians Cricket Club; 152/6 (18 overs)
Yohan de Silva 48* (28); Akalanka Ganegama 2/16 (4 overs)		Ashen Silva 52 (37); Ashan Priyanjan 3/26 (4 overs)

Chilaw won by 4 wickets
Colts Cricket Club Ground, Colombo
Umpires: Ravindra Kottahachchi and Asanga Jayasooriya

- Chilaw Marians Cricket Club, elected to field first

21 January 2016
Scorecard

Tamil Union Cricket and Athletic Club; 165/7 (20 overs)	v	Sri Lanka Army; 166/9 (19.2 overs)
Pulina Tharanga 59* (42); Ajantha Mendis 4/22 (3 overs)		Shalika Karunanayake 51 (38); Shaminda Eranga 4/31 (4 overs)

Sri Lanka Army won by 1 wicket
Nondescripts Cricket Club Ground, Colombo
Umpires: Gamini Dissanayake and Deepal Gunawardene

- Sri Lanka Army, elected to field first

==== Group B ====
22 December 2015
Scorecard

Sinhalese Sports Club; 157/7 (20 overs)	v	Moors Sports Club; 104 (17 overs)
Ramesh Mendis 48 (38); Chaturanga de Silva 2/26 (4 overs)		Dilhara Lokuhettige 67 (41); Dilhara Fernando 4/19 (4 overs)

Sinhalese Sports Club won by 31 runs
Nondescripts Cricket Club Ground, Colombo
Umpires: Ranmore Martinesz and Ravindra Kottahachchi

- Sinhalese Sports Club, elected to bat first
- Kavinda de Thissera, Vishva Wijeratne, Ramesh Mendis, Harith Maduwantha, Tharindu Ratnayake, Lakshan Jayasinghe and Arul Prakash (Sinhalese Sports Club) made their T20 debuts.

5 January 2016
Scorecard

Moors Sports Club; 142/9 (20 overs)	v	Nondescripts Cricket Club; 143/4 (19.1 overs)
Dilhara Lokuhettige 33 (18); Anuk Fernando 3/30 (4 overs)		Angelo Perera 50* (45); Sachithra Serasinghe 1/15 (2.1 overs)

Nondescripts won by 6 wickets
Colts Cricket Club Ground, Colombo
Umpires: Ranmore Martinesz and Ravindra Kottahachchi

- Nondescripts Cricket Club, elected to field first
- Kasun Chamara (Moors Sports Club); Anuk Fernando, Milan Abeysekera and Pramud Hettiwatte (Nondescripts Cricket Club) made their T20 debuts.

5 January 2016
Scorecard

Ragama Cricket Club; 161/7 (20 overs)	v	Bloomfield Cricket and Athletic Club; 150 (19.2 overs)
Udara Jayasundera 39 (26); Lahiru Madushanka 3/32 (4 overs)		Primosh Perera 64 (42); Udara Jayasundera 4/16 (2.2 overs)

Ragama won by 11 runs
Colts Cricket Club Ground, Colombo
Umpires: Ranmore Martinesz and Prageeth Rambukwella

- Nondescripts Cricket Club, elected to field first
- Aloka Amarasiri, Deshan Dias (Bloomfield Cricket and Athletic Club); Tilaksha Sumanasiri, Koshan Dhanushka, Kasun Mahela, Sahan Nanayakkare (Ragama Cricket Club) made their T20 debuts.

5 January 2016
Scorecard

Sinhalese Sports Club; 220/7 (20 overs)	v	Galle Cricket Club; 154/7 (20 overs)
Dasun Shanaka 131* (48); Suraj Randiv 3/21 (4 overs)		Primosh Perera 64 (42); Ramesh Mendis 2/21 (4 overs)

Sinhalese won by 66 runs
P. Sara Oval, Colombo
Umpires: Pradeep Udawatta and Nilan De Silva

- Galle Cricket Club, elected to field first
- Dineth Thimodya, Dulash Udayanga, Navindu Vithanage, Dishan Vithanage, (Galle Cricket Club); Kavindu Kulasekara, Nuwan Thushara (Sinhalese Sports Club) made their T20 debuts.

6 January 2016
Scorecard

Saracens Sports Club; 125/5 (20 overs)	v	Nondescripts Cricket Club; 129/2 (14.5 overs)
Umesh Karunaratne 43 (44); Chamikara Edirisinghe 2/13 (4 overs)		Niroshan Dickwella 79* (46); Chanaka Ruwansiri 2/40 (4 overs)

Nondescripts won by 8 wickets
R. Premadasa Stadium, Colombo
Umpires: Rohitha Kottahachchi and Raveendra Wimalasiri

- Saracens Sports Club, elected to bat first
- Thanuka Dabare (Saracens Sports Club); Sachintha Peiris (Nondescripts Cricket Club) made their T20 debuts.

6 January 2016
Scorecard

Ragama Cricket Club; 150 (19.2 overs)	v	Galle Cricket Club; 129/2 (14.5 overs)
Udara Jayasundera 56 (39); Suraj Randiv 4/25 (4 overs)		Rumesh Buddika 22 (14); Amila Aponso 3/14 (3 overs)

Ragama won by 2 runs (D/L method)
R. Premadasa Stadium, Colombo
Umpires: Rohitha Kottahachchi and Deepal Gunawardene

- Ragama Cricket Club, elected to bat first
- Galle Cricket Club set a revised target of 71 runs from 9 overs.
- Nuwan Karunaratne (Ragama Cricket Club); Malith de Silva, Ashen Bandara, Lahiru Sandaruwan and Chamod Piumal (Galle Cricket Club) made their T20 debuts.

6 January 2016
Scorecard

Bloomfield Cricket and Athletic Club; 119/9 (20 overs)	v	Sinhalese Sports Club; 44/6 (10.4 overs)
Dilhan Cooray 37 (43); Kasun Madushanka 3/19 (4 overs)		Kavindu Kulasekara 12 (15); Dilshan Munaweera 2/7 (2.4 overs)

Bloomfield won by 31 runs (D/L method)
P. Sara Oval, Colombo
Umpires: Prageeth Rambukwella and Ruchira Palliyaguruge

- Bloomfield Cricket and Athletic Club, elected to bat first
- Sinhalese Sports Club set a revised target of 76 runs from 10.4 overs.
- Sachin Jayawardena (Bloomfield Cricket and Athletic Club) made his T20 debut.

12 January 2016
Scorecard

Galle Cricket Club; 147/5 (20 overs)	v	Nondescripts Cricket Club; 150/4 (18.2 overs)
Rumesh Buddika 68 (49); Anuk Fernando 3/23 (4 overs)		Upul Tharanga 34 (24); Tillakaratne Sampath 2/44 (2 overs)

Nondescripts won by 6 wickets
P. Sara Oval, Colombo
Umpires: S. H. Sarathkumara and Ravindra Kottahachchi

- Nondescripts Cricket Club, elected to field first
- Ramindu Nikeshala (Galle Cricket Club); and Nimesha Gunasinghe (Nondescripts Crickets Club) made their T20 debuts.

12 January 2016
Scorecard

Ragama Cricket Club; 147/5 (20 overs)	v	Moors Sports Club; 147/6 (18.2 overs)
Lahiru Milantha 68 (49); Chaturanga de Silva 2/17 (4 overs)		Dilhara Lokuhettige 48 (36); Tilaksha Sumanasiri 2/32 (4 overs)

Moors won by 4 wickets
P. Sara Oval, Colombo
Umpires: S. H. Sarathkumara and Ravindra Kottahachchi

- Ragama Cricket Club, elected to bat first
- Ranmore Martinesz (Galle Cricket Club); and Ravindra Kottahachchi (Nondescripts Crickets Club) made their T20 debuts.

12 January 2016
Scorecard

Sinhalese Sports Club; 251/6 (20 overs)	v	Saracens Sports Club; 128 (16.2 overs)
Dasun Shanaka 123 (46); Chaturanga de Silva 2/17 (4 overs)		Harsha Cooray 47 (30); Lakshan Jayasinghe 2/19 (2.2 overs)

Sinhalese won by 123 runs
P. Sara Oval, Colombo
Umpires: Kapil Kottahachchi and Ravindra Kottahachchi

- Sinhalese Sports Club, elected to bat first
- Dilshan Ranasinghe (Saracens Sports Club) made his T20 debut.

13 January 2016
Scorecard

Bloomfield Cricket and Athletic Club; 142/9 (20 overs)	v	Saracens Sports Club; 95 (15.4 overs)
Deshan Dias 51 (48); Alankara Asanka Silva 4/19 (4 overs)		Alankara Asanka Silva 26 (23); Chathura Randunu 3/23 (3.4 overs)

Bloomfield won by 47 runs
Colts Cricket Club Ground, Colombo
Umpires: Gamini Dissanayake and Asanga Jayasooriya

- Saracens Sports Club, elected to field first
- Akeel Inham (Bloomfield Cricket and Athletic Club) made his T20 debut.

13 January 2016
Scorecard

Moors Sports Club; 177/3 (20 overs)	v	Galle Cricket Club; 161/8 (20 overs)
Mahela Udawatte 94 (67); Chamod Piumal 1/20 (3 overs)		Suraj Randiv 47 (35); Dilhara Lokuhettige 2/23 (4 overs)

Moors won by 16 runs
Colts Cricket Club Ground, Colombo
Umpires: Asanga Jayasooriya and Pradeep Udawatta

- Moors Sports Club, elected to bat first

13 January 2016
Scorecard

Ragama Cricket Club; 185/6 (20 overs)	v	Sinhalese Sports Club; 186/8 (20 overs)
Tilaksha Sumanasiri 66 (44); Thisara Perera 3/28 (3 overs)		Thisara Perera 47 (18); Udara Jayasundera 3/26 (3 overs)

Sinhalese won by 2 wickets
R. Premadasa Stadium, Colombo
Umpires: Raveendra Wimalasiri and Deepal Gunawardene

- Ragama Cricket Club, elected to bat first
- Thissa Sanjeewa (Ragama Cricket Club) made his T20 debut.

19 January 2016
Scorecard

Nondescripts Cricket Club; 140/9 (20 overs)	v	Bloomfield Cricket and Athletic Club; 143/3 (19 overs)
Upul Tharanga 62 (48); Vishwa Fernando 2/17 (2 overs)		Primosh Perera 49 (27); Jehan Mubarak 2/27 (4 overs)

Bloomfield won by 7 wickets
P. Sara Oval, Colombo
Umpires: Gamini Dissanayake and Kapil Kottahachchi

- Bloomfield Cricket and Athletic Club, elected to field first

19 January 2016
Scorecard

Saracens Sports Club; 114/9 (20 overs)	v	Ragama Cricket Club; 112 (19.2 overs)
Alankara Asanka Silva 23 (29); Chathura Peiris 3/28 (4 overs)		Sameera de Zoysa 56* (37); Alankara Asanka Silva 4/13 (4 overs)

Saracens won by 2 runs
P. Sara Oval, Colombo
Umpires: Lyndon Hannibal and Kapil Kottahachchi

- Saracens Sports Club, elected to bat first

19 January 2016
Scorecard

Saracens Sports Club; 180/6 (20 overs)	v	Moors Sports Club; 111 (16.2 overs)
Geeth Kumara 76 (46); Sachithra Serasinghe 2/16 (4 overs)		Yashodha Lanka 22 (15); Sachithra Perera 3/11 (2 overs)

Saracens won by 69 runs
Colts Cricket Club Ground, Colombo
Umpires: Lyndon Hannibal and S. H. Sarathkumara

- Moors Sports Club, elected to field first

20 January 2016
Scorecard

Galle Cricket Club; 147/5 (20 overs)	v	Bloomfield Cricket and Athletic Club; 151/7 (19.2 overs)
Chamara Silva 61 (43); Chathura Randunu 2/23 (4 overs)		Primosh Perera 52 (38); Malith de Silva 3/19 (4 overs)

Bloomfield won by 3 wickets
Colts Cricket Club Ground, Colombo
Umpires: Lyndon Hannibal and Deepal Gunawardene

- Galle Cricket Club, elected to bat first

20 January 2016
Scorecard

Nondescripts Cricket Club; 158/7 (20 overs)	v	Sinhalese Sports Club; 159/7 (19.5 overs)
Upul Tharanga 40 (32); Dilhara Fernando 4/38 (4 overs)		Kavindu Kulasekara 33 (31); Tharindu Kaushal 3/23 (3 overs)

Sinhalese won by 3 wickets
P. Sara Oval, Colombo
Umpires: Ranmore Martinesz and Rohitha Kottahachchi

- Nondescripts Cricket Club, elected to bat first

21 January 2016
Scorecard

Saracens Sports Club; 139/6 (20 overs)	v	Galle Cricket Club; 120/7 (20 overs)
Chanaka Ruwansiri 47* (28); Tillakaratne Sampath 2/26 (4 overs)		Malith de Silva 37 (24); Akila Isanka 3/12 (4 overs)

Saracens won by 19 runs
P. Sara Oval, Colombo
Umpires: Kapil Kottahachchi and Rohitha Kottahachchi

- Galle Cricket Club, elected to field first
- Binuka Waduge (Galle Cricket Club) made his T20 debut.

21 January 2016
Scorecard

Bloomfield Cricket and Athletic Club; 101 (18.1 overs)	v	Moors Sports Club; 104/1 (14.1 overs)
Chanaka Ruwansiri 47* (28); Tillakaratne Sampath 2/26 (4 overs)		Mahela Udawatte 54* (42); Nipun Karunanayake 1/2 (1 overs)

Moors won by 9 wickets
P. Sara Oval, Colombo
Umpires: Kapil Kottahachchi and Lyndon Hannibal

- Bloomfield Cricket and Athletic Club, elected to bat first
- Tharusha Rathnayake (Moors Sports Club) made his T20 debut.

21 January 2016
Scorecard

Ragama Cricket Club; 116/9 (18.1 overs)	v	Nondescripts Cricket Club; 118/6 (10.3 overs)
Heshan Wanniarchchi 58 (50); Sachintha Peiris 3/15 (4 overs)		Sandun Weerakkody 43 (16); Thissa Sanjeewa 3/40 (3 overs)

Nondescripts won by 4 wickets
Colts Cricket Club Ground, Colombo
Umpires: Asanga Jayasooriya and Pradeep Udawatta

- Ragama Cricket Club, elected to bat first

=== Knockout stage ===
==== Semifinals ====
1st Semifinal
23 January 2016
Scorecard

Nondescripts Cricket Club; 178/9 (20 overs)	v	Tamil Union Cricket and Athletic Club; 182/7 (18.5 overs)
Dinesh Chandimal 63 (36); Suranga Lakmal 2/23 (4 overs)		Tillakaratne Dilshan 95* (35); Isuru Udana 3/53 (3.5 overs)

Tamil Union won by 3 wickets
R.Premadasa Stadium, Colombo
Umpires: Ranmore Martinesz and Ravindra Kottahachchi

- Tamil Union Cricket and Athletic Club, elected to field first

2nd Semifinal
23 January 2016
Scorecard

Sinhalese Sports Club; 144 (20 overs)	v	Sri Lanka Army; 145/5 (17.4 overs)
Thisara Perera 22 (16); Ajantha Mendis 2/24 (4 overs)		Shalika Karunanayake 43 (35); Dilhara Fernando 2/32 (3 overs)

Sri Lanka Army won by 5 wickets
R.Premadasa Stadium, Colombo
Umpires: Deepal Gunawardene and Lyndon Hannibal

- Sri Lanka Army, elected to field first

==== Final ====
24 January 2016
Scorecard

Tamil Union Cricket and Athletic Club; 164/9 (20 overs)	v	Sri Lanka Army; 170/5 (17 overs)
Tillakaratne Dilshan 85 (57); Janaka Sampath 4/24 (4 overs)		Asela Gunaratne 65* (43); Shaminda Eranga 2/19 (3 overs)

Sri Lanka Army won by 5 wickets
R. Premadasa Stadium, Colombo
Umpires: Ranmore Martinesz and Rohitha Kottahachchi

- Sri Lanka Army, elected to field first.
