= 2015–16 Premier League Tournament =

Cricket tournament

- Dates: 4 December 2015 – 6 March 2016
- Administrator: Sri Lanka Cricket
- Cricket format: First-class cricket
- Tournament format: Round-robin then knockout
- Host: Sri Lanka
- Champions: Tamil Union Cricket and Athletic Club (3rd title)
- Participants: 14
- Most runs: Tharanga Paranavitana (953)
- Most wickets: Lakshan Sandakan (52)

The 2015–16 Premier League Tournament was the 28th season of first-class cricket in Sri Lanka's Premier Trophy. It was held between 4 December 2015 and 6 March 2016, with fourteen teams competing. Tamil Union Cricket and Athletic Club won the competition, their first championship since the 1950–51 season.

== Teams ==
The following teams competed:

Group A

- Chilaw Marians Cricket Club
- Colombo Cricket Club
- Moors Sports Club
- Ragama Cricket Club
- Saracens Sports Club
- Sri Lanka Ports Authority Cricket Club
- Tamil Union Cricket and Athletic Club

Group B

- Badureliya Sports Club
- Bloomfield Cricket and Athletic Club
- Colts Cricket Club
- Galle Cricket Club
- Nondescripts Cricket Club
- Sinhalese Sports Club
- Sri Lanka Army Sports Club

== Fixtures ==
=== Group A ===
4–6 December 2015
Scorecard

Saracens Sports Club	v	Sri Lanka Ports Authority Cricket Club
44/1 (15.1 overs); Sangeeth Cooray 29* (37); Omesh Wijesiriwardene 1/14 (5 overs)

Match drawn
De Zoysa Stadium, Moratuwa
Umpires: Ravindra Kottahachchi and Seekkuge Sarathkumara

- Saracens Sports Club won the toss and elected to bat.
- Sangeeth Cooray (Saracens Sports Club) and Lasith Lakshan (Sri Lanka Ports Authority Cricket Club) both made their first-class debuts.

4–6 December 2015
Scorecard

Ragama Cricket Club	v	Moors Sports Club
250 (72 overs); Lahiru Milantha 144 (162); Malinda Pushpakumara 5/87 (28)		116/5 (29 overs); Sachithra Serasinghe 37* (62); Amila Aponso 3/31 (12 overs)

Match drawn
Moors Sports Club Ground, Colombo
Umpires: Nilan De Silva and Pradeep Udawatta

- Moors Sports Club won the toss and elected to field.
- Shehan Sandaruwan (Ragama Cricket Club) made his first-class debut.

4–6 December 2015
Scorecard

Colombo Cricket Club	v	Tamil Union Cricket and Athletic Club
117 (38.5 overs); Lahiru Udara 34 (56); Nisala Tharaka 7/50 (12.5 overs)		57/0 (18 overs); Pabasara Waduge 31* (62)

Match drawn
Colombo Cricket Club Ground, Colombo
Umpires: Chaminda Hathurusingha and Rohitha Kottahachchi

- Tamil Union Cricket and Athletic Club won the toss and elected to field.
- Nalin Priyadarshana (Colombo Cricket Club) made his first-class debut.

11–13 December 2015
Scorecard

Colombo Cricket Club	v	Ragama Cricket Club
171 (52.5 overs); Nisham Mazahir 53 (74); Amila Aponso 4/33 (17 overs)		121 (37.1 overs); Chanaka Wijesinghe 50 (95); Sachith Pathirana 5/35 (15 overs)
260 (76.2 overs); Sachith Pathirana 80 (52); Amila Aponso 6/65 (28.2 overs)		231 (90.3 overs); Sameera de Zoysa 77 (152); Lakshan Sandakan 4/64 (20 overs)

Colombo Cricket Club won by 79 runs
Surrey Village Cricket Ground, Maggona
Umpires: Palitha de Alwis and Nilan De Silva

- Ragama Cricket Club won the toss and elected to field.

11–13 December 2015
Scorecard

Sri Lanka Ports Authority Cricket Club	v	Chilaw Marians Cricket Club
230 (78.2 overs); Yohan de Silva 70 (164); Maduka Liyanapathiranage 4/35 (23 overs)		255/5 (83 overs); Kasun Vidura 71 (192); Shanuka Dissanayake 1/4 (3.3 overs)

Match drawn
FTZ Sports Complex, Katunayake
Umpires: Pradeep Udawatta and Ranjith Vishwakula

- Chilaw Marians Cricket Club won the toss and elected to field.

11–13 December 2015
Scorecard

Moors Sports Club	v	Saracens Sports Club

Match abandoned
Moors Sports Club Ground, Colombo
Umpires: Asanga Jayasooriya and Seekkuge Sarathkumara

- No toss.
- No play was possible.

18–20 December 2015
Scorecard

Sri Lanka Ports Authority Cricket Club	v	Ragama Cricket Club
144/9d (31 overs); Gihan Rupasinghe 71* (63); Chathura Peiris 3/27 (8 overs)		26/0 (7 overs); Lahiru Milantha 16* (22)

Match drawn
Army Ground, Mattegoda
Umpires: Asanga Jayasooriya and Eric Kannangara

- Ragama Cricket Club won the toss and elected to field.
- Tilaksha Sumanasiri (Ragama Cricket Club) made his first-class debut.

18–20 December 2015
Scorecard

Moors Sports Club	v	Tamil Union Cricket and Athletic Club
203 (64.5 overs); Chaturanga de Silva 66 (120); Dhananjaya de Silva 4/56 (19 overs)		255 (82.4 overs); Tharanga Paranavitana 67 (171); Malinda Pushpakumara 4/76 (23.4 overs)

Match drawn
P Sara Oval, Colombo
Umpires: Nilan De Silva and Raveendra Wimalasiri

- Tamil Union Cricket and Athletic Club won the toss and elected to field.
- Chamika Karunaratne (Tamil Union Cricket and Athletic Club) made his first-class debut.

18–20 December 2015
Scorecard

Chilaw Marians Cricket Club	v	Colombo Cricket Club
193 (87.3 overs); Akshu Fernando 61 (150); Lakshan Sandakan 5/67 (27 overs)		265/9d (67.5 overs); Andy Solomons 72 (66); Lahiru Gamage 4/65 (20 overs)
134/6 (45 overs); Malinda Warnapura 38 (60); Lakshan Sandakan 3/59 (18 overs)

Match drawn
FTZ Sports Complex, Katunayake
Umpires: Chaminda Hathurusingha and Prageeth Rambukwella

- Chilaw Marians Cricket Club won the toss and elected to bat.

26–28 December 2015
Scorecard

Sri Lanka Ports Authority Cricket Club	v	Tamil Union Cricket and Athletic Club
183 (56.1 overs); Gayan Maneeshan 48 (102); Dhananjaya de Silva 3/8 (5.1 overs)		227 (64.5 overs); Charith Jayampathi 43 (42); Chanaka Komasaru 4/36 (15 overs)
102 (35.3 overs); Harsha Rajapaksha 30 (63); Dhananjaya de Silva 6/33 (13.3 overs)		60/1 (7.4 overs); Dhananjaya de Silva 38* (16); Chanaka Komasaru 1/30 (3 overs)

Tamil Union Cricket and Athletic Club won by 9 wickets
Colts Cricket Club Ground, Colombo
Umpires: Rohitha Kottahachchi and Prageeth Rambukwella

- Tamil Union Cricket and Athletic Club and elected to field.
- Harsha Rajapaksha (Sri Lanka Ports Authority Cricket Club) made his first-class debut.

26–28 December 2015
Scorecard

Moors Sports Club	v	Chilaw Marians Cricket Club
201 (68.3 overs); Mahela Udawatte 66 (160); Lahiru Gamage 3/41 (14 overs)		137 (57.2 overs); Saliya Saman 38 (71); Sachithra Serasinghe 5/17 (9.2 overs)
195 (66.4 overs); Sachithra Serasinghe 40 (72); Dinuka Hettiarachchi 7/101 (33 overs)		167 (40.4 overs); Saliya Saman 87 (98); Kaushalya Gajasinghe 4/47 (6 overs)

Moors Sports Club won by 92 runs
Moors Sports Club Ground, Colombo
Umpires: Gamini Dissanayake and Lyndon Hannibal

- Chilaw Marians Cricket Club and elected to field.

26–28 December 2015
Scorecard

Colombo Cricket Club	v	Saracens Sports Club
263 (55.2 overs); Andy Solomons 96 (57); Umesh Karunaratne 4/56 (16 overs)		164 (62.3 overs); Harsha Cooray 66 (139); Lakshan Sandakan 4/22 (15.3 overs)
109 (34.3 overs); Sachith Pathirana 60 (45); Akila Isanka 5/51 (14 overs)		192/6 (67 overs); Harsha Cooray 73* (169); Lakshan Sandakan 3/44 (21 overs)

Match drawn
Tyronne Fernando Stadium, Moratuwa
Umpires: Kapil Kottahachchi and Pradeep Udawatta

- Colombo Cricket Club and elected to bat.
- Sompal Kami (Saracens Sports Club) made his first-class debut.

2–4 January 2016
Scorecard

Colombo Cricket Club	v	Sri Lanka Ports Authority Cricket Club
92 (30 overs); Sachith Pathirana 25 (23); Chanaka Komasaru 6/29 (12 overs)		128 (26.4 overs); Gihan Rupasinghe 83 (49); Sachith Pathirana 5/32 (9 overs)
126 (32.1 overs); Andy Solomons 40 (45); Chanaka Komasaru 4/33 (12 overs)		93/1 (14.2 overs); Ashan Priyanjan 50 (34); Akila Jayasundera 1/28 (3.2 overs)

Sri Lanka Ports Authority Cricket Club won by 9 wickets
Colombo Cricket Club Ground, Colombo
Umpires: Lyndon Hannibal and Raveendra Wimalasiri

- Colombo Cricket Club won the toss and elected to bat.

2–4 January 2016
Scorecard

Tamil Union Cricket and Athletic Club	v	Ragama Cricket Club
426 (95.5 overs); Dhananjaya de Silva 91 (137); Sanjaya Fernando 4/74 (19 overs)		559 (140.1 overs); Lahiru Milantha 191 (240); Ramith Rambukwella 3/102 (34 overs)
134/1 (34 overs); Pabasara Waduge 63* (96); Sanjaya Fernando 1/48 (12 overs)

Match drawn
P Sara Oval, Colombo
Umpires: Deepal Gunawardene and Ruchira Palliyaguruge

- Tamil Union Cricket and Athletic Club won the toss and elected to bat.
- Sithara Gimhan (Tamil Union Cricket and Athletic Club) made his first-class debut.

2–4 January 2016
Scorecard

Saracens Sports Club	v	Chilaw Marians Cricket Club
405/9d (131.2 overs); Alankara Asanka Silva 102* (176); Lahiru Gamage 5/149 (37.3 overs)		400 (129.4 overs); Akalanka Ganegama 133 (233); Umesh Karunaratne 4/101 (40 overs)

Match drawn
FTZ Sports Complex, Katunayake
Umpires: Asanga Jayasooriya and Prageeth Rambukwella

- Saracens Sports Club won the toss and elected to bat.

8–10 January 2016
Scorecard

Moors Sports Club	v	Sri Lanka Ports Authority Cricket Club
392 (109.1 overs); Mahela Udawatte 212 (302); Chaminda Bandara 4/124 (25 overs)		306 (91 overs); Gihan Rupasinghe 72 (62); Kaushalya Gajasinghe 3/74 (18 overs)
137/2 (46 overs); Irosh Samarasooriya 52* (114); Aravinda Premaratne 1/22 (8 overs)

Match drawn
Colombo Cricket Club Ground, Colombo
Umpires: Rohitha Kottahachchi and Seekkuge Sarathkumara

- Sri Lanka Ports Authority Cricket Club won the toss and elected to field.

8–10 January 2016
Scorecard

Saracens Sports Club	v	Tamil Union Cricket and Athletic Club
237 (60.2 overs); Umesh Karunaratne 73 (121); Pramod Madushan 3/48 (11.2 overs)		305 (92 overs); Tharanga Paranavitana 91 (164); Alankara Asanka Silva 4/47 (14 overs)
113 (39.4 overs); Mohammed Aslam 35 (72); Jeevan Mendis 4/36 (13 overs)		46/3 (10.3 overs); Pabasara Waduge 18 (27); Akila Isanka 2/22 (4 overs)

Tamil Union Cricket and Athletic Club won by 7 wickets
Army Ground, Mattegoda
Umpires: Ranmore Martinesz and Raveendra Wimalasiri

- Saracens Sports Club won the toss and elected to bat.
- Ishara Prashan (Tamil Union Cricket and Athletic Club) made his first-class debut.

8–10 January 2016
Scorecard

Ragama Cricket Club	v	Chilaw Marians Cricket Club
257 (86.2 overs); Eranga Rathnayake 103* (191); Maduka Liyanapathiranage 4/68 (23 overs)		344 (113 overs); Nimesh Perera 85* (70); Amila Aponso 7/130 (53 overs)
156/3 (72 overs); Udara Jayasundera 58 (218); Dinuka Hettiarachchi 3/63 (26 overs)

Match drawn
FTZ Sports Complex, Katunayake
Umpires: Nilan De Silva and Lyndon Hannibal

- Ragama Cricket Club won the toss and elected to bat.
- Thanura Halambage (Chilaw Marians Cricket Club) made his first-class debut.

14–15 January 2016
Scorecard

Ragama Cricket Club	v	Saracens Sports Club
333 (106.1 overs); Roshen Silva 145 (216); Umesh Karunaratne 3/92 (34 overs)		76 (22 overs); Mohammed Aslam 27 (37); Sanjaya Fernando 3/26 (6 overs)
		98 (28.1 overs) (f/o); Mohammed Aslam 48 (73); Amila Aponso 4/23 (9 overs)

Ragama Cricket Club won by an innings and 159 runs
Surrey Village, Maggona
Umpires: Saman Mohan de Silva and Nilan De Silva

- Saracens Sports Club won the toss and elected to field.

15–16 January 2016
Scorecard

Moors Sports Club	v	Colombo Cricket Club
201 (57.2 overs); Denuwan Rajakaruna 59 (122); Andy Solomons 4/29 (10 overs)		79 (22.2 overs); Kusal Mendis 40 (46); Malinda Pushpakumara 8/41 (11.2 overs)
268 (56.4 overs); Mahela Udawatte 120 (136); Sachith Pathirana 4/85 (19 overs)		155 (37.3 overs); Nisham Mazahir 40 (49); Malinda Pushpakumara 5/78 (19 overs)

Moors Sports Club won by 235 runs
Colombo Cricket Club Ground, Colombo
Umpires: Gamini Dissanayake and Asanga Jayasooriya

- Moors Sports Club won the toss and elected to bat.
- Dulanjana Seneviratne (Colombo Cricket Club) made his first-class debut.

15–17 January 2016
Scorecard

Tamil Union Cricket and Athletic Club	v	Chilaw Marians Cricket Club
419 (126.1 overs); Dhananjaya de Silva 150 (212); Maduka Liyanapathiranage 9/142 (39.1 overs)		148 (40.5 overs); Maduka Liyanapathiranage 50 (59); Jeevan Mendis 3/23 (8 overs)
399/6 (84 overs); Tharanga Paranavitana 150* (200); Dinuka Hettiarachchi 2/122 (27 overs)

Match drawn
P Sara Oval, Colombo
Umpires: Rohitha Kottahachchi and Prageeth Rambukwella

- Tamil Union Cricket and Athletic Club won the toss and elected to bat.

=== Group B ===
4–6 December 2015
Scorecard

Nondescripts Cricket Club	v	Sinhalese Sports Club
7/0 (2.4 overs); Upul Tharanga 5* (8)

Match drawn
Nondescripts Cricket Club Ground, Colombo
Umpires: Asanga Jayasooriya and Kapil Kottahachchi

- Sinhalese Sports Club won the toss and elected to bat.
- Nimesha Gunasinghe (Nondescripts Cricket Club) and Harith Maduwantha (Sinhalese Sports Club) both made their first-class debuts.

4–6 December 2015
Scorecard

Sri Lanka Army Sports Club	v	Badureliya Sports Club
287/6 (77 overs); Asela Gunaratne 124* (180); Imesh Udayanga 3/81 (24 overs)

Match drawn
Army Ground, Panagoda
Umpires: Saman Mohan de Silva and Ruchira Palliyaguruge

- Sri Lanka Army Sports Club won the toss and elected to bat.
- Sahan Adeesha and Pathum Madusanka (Badureliya Sports Club) both made their first-class debuts.

4–6 December 2015
Scorecard

Colts Cricket Club	v	Bloomfield Cricket and Athletic Club
24/2 (6 overs); Shehan Fernando 15 (15); Imran Khan 2/19 (3 overs)

Match drawn
Bloomfield Cricket and Athletic Club Ground, Colombo
Umpires: Gamini Dissanayake and Deepal Gunawardene

- Bloomfield Cricket and Athletic Club won the toss and elected to field.

11–13 December 2015
Scorecard

Galle Cricket Club	v	Nondescripts Cricket Club
298 (101.4 overs); Rumesh Buddika 137 (227); Tharindu Kaushal 6/104 (30.4 overs)		136 (39.4 overs); Sandun Weerakkody 46 (55); Gayan Sirisoma 7/51 (14.4 overs)
204/8d (69 overs); Nisal Randika 37 (108); Anuk Fernando 4/46 (13 overs)		131/5 (46 overs); Angelo Perera 35* (68); Suraj Randiv 3/41 (21 overs)

Match drawn
Galle International Stadium, Galle
Umpires: Chaminda Hathurusingha and Raveendra Wimalasiri

- Galle Cricket Club won the toss and elected to bat.
- Dulash Udayanga, Navindu Vithanage and Deshan Withanage (Galle Cricket Club) all made their first-class debuts.

11–13 December 2015
Scorecard

Sinhalese Sports Club	v	Bloomfield Cricket and Athletic Club
341/9d (86.1 overs); Minod Bhanuka 127 (189); Lahiru Madushanka 4/69 (20.1 overs)		248/5 (83 overs); Nipun Karunanayake 71 (142); Dilhara Fernando 2/58 (11 overs)

Match drawn
Sinhalese Sports Club Ground, Colombo
Umpires: Saman Mohan de Silva and Ruchira Palliyaguruge

- Bloomfield Cricket and Athletic Club won the toss and elected to field.
- Malinga de Silva (Bloomfield Cricket and Athletic Club) and Kavinda de Thissera (Sinhalese Sports Club) both made their first-class debuts.

11–13 December 2015
Scorecard

Sri Lanka Army Sports Club	v	Colts Cricket Club
119 (48.2 overs); Janith Silva 42 (52); Prabath Jayasuriya 4/27 (12.2 overs)		123 (44.2 overs); Sadeera Samarawickrama 36 (71); Danusika Bandara 5/46 (15.2 overs)
57/2 (15 overs); Lakshan Edirisinghe 27 (36); Chathupama Gunasinghe 1/14 (3 overs)

Match drawn
Army Ground, Panagoda
Umpires: Deepal Gunawardene and Eric Kannangara

- Sri Lanka Army Sports Club won the toss and elected to bat.

18–20 December 2015
Scorecard

Badureliya Sports Club	v	Bloomfield Cricket and Athletic Club
221 (61.4 overs); Sahan Wijeratne 66 (100); Upul Indrasiri 5/57 (22 overs)		296 (80.5 overs); Deshan Dias 143* (208); Dulanjana Mendis 5/88 (25 overs)
86/7 (28 overs); Imesh Udayanga 31 (65); Upul Indrasiri 4/28 (13 overs)

Match drawn
Surrey Village, Maggona
Umpires: Kapil Kottahachchi and Ravindra Kottahachchi

- Bloomfield Cricket and Athletic Club won the toss and elected to field.
- Akthab Cader and Praveen Fernando (Badureliya Sports Club) both made their first-class debuts.

18–20 December 2015
Scorecard

Galle Cricket Club	v	Sri Lanka Army Sports Club
406/5d (117 overs); Nisal Randika 135* (292); Seekkuge Prasanna 2/89 (32 overs)		201 (61.1 overs); Manjula de Zoysa 73 (172); Suraj Randiv 8/111 (28.1 overs)
232/5 (40 overs); Seekkuge Prasanna 76* (31); Tillakaratne Sampath 2/39 (7 overs)

Match drawn
Galle International Stadium, Galle
Umpires: Pradeep Udawatta and Ranjith Vishwakula

- Galle Cricket Club won the toss and elected to bat.

18–20 December 2015
Scorecard

Nondescripts Cricket Club	v	Colts Cricket Club

Match abandoned
Nondescripts Cricket Club Ground, Colombo
Umpires: Gamini Dissanayake and Vidura Prasad

- No toss.
- No play was possible.

26–28 December 2015
Scorecard

Nondescripts Cricket Club	v	Badureliya Sports Club
499/7d (99.1 overs); Niroshan Dickwella 137 (156); Imesh Udayanga 3/90 (23 overs)		247 (80.5 overs); Imesh Udayanga 107 (230); Tharindu Kaushal 5/87 (32 overs)
		149 (54 overs) (f/o); Nadeera Nawela 81 (127); Tharindu Kaushal 4/41 (15 overs)

Nondescripts Cricket Club won by an innings and 103 runs
Nondescripts Cricket Club Ground, Colombo
Umpires: Deepal Gunawardene and Raveendra Wimalasiri

- Nondescripts Cricket Club won the toss and elected to bat.

26–28 December 2015
Scorecard

Galle Cricket Club	v	Bloomfield Cricket and Athletic Club
401/8d (125 overs); Nisal Randika 106* (227); Chathura Randunu 2/65 (19 overs)		270 (74 overs); Madawa Warnapura 87 (205); Suraj Randiv 5/113 (28 overs)
135/6 (38.3 overs); Rumesh Buddika 29 (64); Vishwa Fernando 3/25 (11 overs)

Match drawn
Bloomfield Cricket and Athletic Club Ground, Colombo
Umpires: Asanga Jayasooriya and Ruchira Palliyaguruge

- Galle Cricket Club won the toss and elected to bat.

26–28 December 2015
Scorecard

Sri Lanka Army Sports Club	v	Sinhalese Sports Club
270 (107.2 overs); Sanjika Ridma 89 (240); Tharindu Ratnayake 4/86 (30 overs)		133 (33.1 overs); Kasun Madushanka 37 (24); Nuwan Liyanapathirana 5/30 (10 overs)
203/6d (41 overs); Asela Gunaratne 52 (55); Kasun Madushanka 4/56 (15 overs)		149/5 (54 overs); Dimuth Karunaratne 52 (105); Seekkuge Prasanna 2/68 (20 overs)

Match drawn
Sinhalese Sports Club Ground, Colombo
Umpires: Ravindra Kottahachchi and Seekkuge Sarathkumara

- Sinhalese Sports Club won the toss and elected to field.
- Tharindu Ratnayake, Nuwan Thushara (Sinhalese Sports Club) and Thuduwage Kumara (Sri Lanka Army Sports Club) all made their first-class debuts.

2–4 January 2016
Scorecard

Sri Lanka Army Sports Club	v	Nondescripts Cricket Club
190 (56.5 overs); Asela Gunaratne 67* (119); Chamikara Edirisinghe 7/57 (19.5 overs)		228 (90.2 overs); Anuk Fernando 79 (149); Nuwan Liyanapathirana 2/35 (14 overs)
92 (33.3 overs); Sanjika Ridma 37* (79); Chamikara Edirisinghe 6/48 (16.3 overs)		59/1 (6.3 overs); Upul Tharanga 31* (20); Sanjika Ridma 1/4 (1 overs)

Nondescripts Cricket Club won by 9 wickets
Army Ground, Panagoda
Umpires: Ravindra Kottahachchi and Pradeep Udawatta

- Nondescripts Cricket Club won the toss and elected to field.
- Aravinda Akurugoda (Nondescripts Cricket Club) made his first-class debut.

2–4 January 2016
Scorecard

Colts Cricket Club	v	Badureliya Sports Club
344 (89 overs); Hashan Dumindu 86 (155); Dulanjana Mendis 3/76 (35 overs)		134 (45.5 overs); Nadeera Nawela 46 (92); Prabath Jayasuriya 5/25 (12.5 overs)
		164 (41.1 overs) (f/o); Roscoe Thattil 57 (55); Prabath Jayasuriya 5/58 (15 overs)

Colts Cricket Club won by an innings and 46 runs
Surrey Village, Maggona
Umpires: Nilan De Silva and Rohitha Kottahachchi

- Colts Cricket Club won the toss and elected to bat.
- Sahan Arachchige (Colts Cricket Club) made his first-class debut.

2–4 January 2016
Scorecard

Galle Cricket Club	v	Sinhalese Sports Club
376 (80.4 overs); Chamara Silva 108 (110); Dasun Shanaka 6/69 (22 overs)		399 (100 overs); Dasun Shanaka 108 (133); Tillakaratne Sampath 4/74 (19 overs)
201 (64 overs); Chamara Silva 51 (79); Tharindu Ratnayake 4/65 (25 overs)

Match drawn
Sinhalese Sports Club Ground, Colombo
Umpires: Gamini Dissanayake and Kapil Kottahachchi

- Sinhalese Sports Club won the toss and elected to field.

8–10 January 2016
Scorecard

Nondescripts Cricket Club	v	Bloomfield Cricket and Athletic Club
365 (105.3 overs); Niroshan Dickwella 94 (108); Vishwa Fernando 4/83 (28 overs)		235 (71.1 overs); Dilhan Cooray 63 (111); Chamikara Edirisinghe 4/43 (18.1 overs)
283/4 (57 overs); Niroshan Dickwella 117 (107); Nipun Karunanayake 2/41 (9 overs)

Match drawn
Bloomfield Cricket and Athletic Club Ground, Colombo
Umpires: Deepal Gunawardene and Kapil Kottahachchi

- Bloomfield Cricket and Athletic Club won the toss and elected to field.

8–10 January 2016
Scorecard

Badureliya Sports Club	v	Sinhalese Sports Club
254 (82 overs); Hasantha Fernando 62 (119); Binura Fernando 4/22 (10 overs)		584/2d (106.3 overs); Minod Bhanuka 342 (320); Sahan Adeesha 1/83 (18 overs)
209 (51.4 overs); Nadeera Nawela 58 (60); Tharindu Ratnayake 4/67 (18 overs)

Sinhalese Sports Club won by an innings and 121 runs
Surrey Village, Maggona
Umpires: Gamini Dissanayake and Chaminda Hathurusingha

- Badureliya Sports Club won the toss and elected to bat.
- Sachin Hewawasam (Badureliya Sports Club) made his first-class debut.

8–10 January 2016
Scorecard

Galle Cricket Club	v	Colts Cricket Club
376 (95.2 overs); Chamara Silva 136 (185); Ishan Jayaratne 5/41 (18 overs)		444 (126.5 overs); Angelo Jayasinghe 141 (304); Gayan Sirisoma 6/127 (53.5 overs)
127/5 (30 overs); Tillakaratne Sampath 70 (71); Prabath Jayasuriya 4/35 (11 overs)

Match drawn
Colts Cricket Club Ground, Colombo
Umpires: Kumar Dharmasena and Ravindra Kottahachchi

- Colts Cricket Club won the toss and elected to field.
- Lahiru Sandaruwan (Galle Cricket Club) made his first-class debut.

15–17 January 2016
Scorecard

Colts Cricket Club	v	Sinhalese Sports Club
225 (58.1 overs); Priyamal Perera 83 (117); Dilhara Fernando 4/45 (10 overs)		214 (66 overs); Dimuth Karunaratne 92 (131); Prabath Jayasuriya 4/72 (20 overs)
387 (101.1 overs); Hashan Dumindu 96 (246); Dasun Shanaka 3/81 (21 overs)		219/3 (42 overs); Dimuth Karunaratne 101* (127); Akila Dananjaya 2/71 (14 overs)

Match drawn
Sinhalese Sports Club Ground, Colombo
Umpires: Lyndon Hannibal and Seekkuge Sarathkumara

- Sinhalese Sports Club won the toss and elected to field.

15–17 January 2016
Scorecard

Sri Lanka Army Sports Club	v	Bloomfield Cricket and Athletic Club
212 (64.1 overs); Asela Gunaratne 81 (159); Upul Indrasiri 5/72 (20 overs)		194 (61.3 overs); Dilhan Cooray 77 (153); Dushan Vimukthi 4/26 (16 overs)
150 (47 overs); Manjula de Zoysa 36 (62); Upul Indrasiri 4/35 (18 overs)		169/2 (45.2 overs); Madawa Warnapura 67* (134); Dushan Vimukthi 1/12 (8 overs)

Bloomfield Cricket and Athletic Club won by 8 wickets
Bloomfield Cricket and Athletic Club Ground, Colombo
Umpires: Kapil Kottahachchi and Ravindra Kottahachchi

- Sri Lanka Army Sports Club won the toss and elected to bat.
- Iran Indika (Sri Lanka Army Sports Club) made his first-class debut.

15–17 January 2016
Scorecard

Badureliya Sports Club	v	Galle Cricket Club
160 (55.2 overs); Nadeera Nawela 60 (120); Gayan Sirisoma 4/37 (20.2 overs)		494/7d (88.5 overs); Rumesh Buddika 193 (177); Sahan Adeesha 3/62 (18 overs)
233 (61.5 overs); Hasantha Fernando 65 (66); Gayan Sirisoma 6/90 (26.5 overs)

Galle Cricket Club won by an innings and 101 runs
Galle International Stadium, Galle
Umpires: Deepal Gunawardene and Pradeep Udawatta

- Badureliya Sports Club won the toss and elected to bat.
- Yashan Samarasinghe (Badureliya Sports Club) made his first-class debut.

=== Plate Championship ===
19–21 February 2016
Scorecard

Badureliya Sports Club	v	Sri Lanka Ports Authority Cricket Club
197 (74.1 overs); Sachin Hewawasam 64 (217); Chaminda Bandara 5/63 (18 overs)		211 (51.5 overs); Gihan Rupasinghe 48 (28); Kasun Rajitha 5/86 (18.5 overs)
267/7d (50.2 overs); Hasantha Fernando 88 (87); Chaminda Bandara 4/109 (19 overs)		143/5 (52.3 overs); Ranesh Perera 50* (128); Imesh Udayanga 2/26 (14 overs)

Match drawn
Army Ground, Panagoda
Umpires: Jayantha de Silva and Eric Kannangara

- Sri Lanka Ports Authority Cricket Club won the toss and elected to field.
- Nishan Peiris and Akash Senaratne (Badureliya Sports Club) both made their first-class debuts.

19–21 February 2016
Scorecard

Chilaw Marians Cricket Club	v	Sri Lanka Army Sports Club
306 (98 overs); Ashen Silva 71 (161); Seekkuge Prasanna 4/62 (18 overs)		286 (106.3 overs); Leo Fransisco 89 (189); Dinuka Hettiarachchi 7/110 (44 overs)
125/2 (39 overs); Kasun Vidura 56* (116); Dushan Vimukthi 1/14 (7 overs)

Match drawn
Colombo Cricket Club Ground, Colombo
Umpires: Kapil Kottahachchi and Ranjith Vishwakula

- Sri Lanka Army Sports Club won the toss and elected to field.

19–21 February 2016
Scorecard

Saracens Sports Club	v	Bloomfield Cricket and Athletic Club
492/9d (148.2 overs); Gamindu Kanishka 217 (378); Upul Indrasiri 5/153 (47.2 overs)		228 (60 overs); Primosh Perera 82 (78); Buddika Sanjeewa 4/86 (20 overs)
127/1 (48 overs); Ishan Nilaksha 60* (150); Chathura Randunu 1/40 (12 overs)

Match drawn
FTZ Sports Complex, Katunayake
Umpires: Saman Mohan de Silva and Chaminda Hathurusingha

- Saracens Sports Club won the toss and elected to bat.

26–28 February 2016
Scorecard

Sri Lanka Army Sports Club	v	Saracens Sports Club
272 (79.3 overs); Janith Silva 68* (115); Buddika Sanjeewa 4/92 (25 overs)		113 (56.5 overs); Mohammed Aslam 32 (103); Ravindra Palleguruge 5/14 (9.5 overs)
253 (110 overs); Gamindu Kanishka 45 (90); Dushan Vimukthi 3/37 (24 overs)		95/3 (16.3 overs); Asela Gunaratne 37* (31); Sachithra Perera 1/5 (2 overs)

Sri Lanka Army Sports Club won by 7 wickets
Bloomfield Cricket and Athletic Club Ground, Colombo
Umpires: Lyndon Hannibal and Chaminda Hathurusingha

- Sri Lanka Army Sports Club won the toss and elected to bat.

26–28 February 2016
Scorecard

Chilaw Marians Cricket Club	v	Badureliya Sports Club
242 (46.1 overs); Saliya Saman 82 (91); Kasun Rajitha 7/86 (16 overs)		385 (121.2 overs); Nadeera Nawela 119 (229); Maduka Liyanapathiranage 5/113 (34.2 overs)
290 (82.4 overs); Ashen Silva 96 (203); Kasun Rajitha 5/94 (23 overs)		81/3 (10 overs); Imran Butt 40 (24); Maduka Liyanapathiranage 1/2 (1 over)

Match drawn
FTZ Sports Complex, Katunayake
Umpires: Asanga Jayasooriya and Upul Wewage

- Badureliya Sports Club won the toss and elected to field.

26–28 February 2016
Scorecard

Bloomfield Cricket and Athletic Club	v	Sri Lanka Ports Authority Cricket Club
477/9d (112.4 overs); Lahiru Madushanka 130 (184); Chaminda Bandara 3/118 (22.4 overs)		214 (50.5 overs); Wanidu Hasaranga 87 (104); Upul Indrasiri 5/70 (20.5 overs)
		251/9 (87 overs); Prashan Wickramasinghe 96 (224); Chathura Randunu 5/70 (25 overs)

Match drawn
Army Ground, Panagoda
Umpires: Deepal Gunawardene and Ranganath Prasanna

- Bloomfield Cricket and Athletic Club won the toss and elected to bat.
- Aloka Amarasiri (Bloomfield Cricket and Athletic Club) and Wanidu Hasaranga (Sri Lanka Ports Authority Cricket Club) both made their first-class debuts.

4–6 March 2016
Scorecard

Chilaw Marians Cricket Club	v	Bloomfield Cricket and Athletic Club
346 (69 overs); Nimesh Perera 115 (65); Upul Indrasiri 4/75 (16 overs)		447 (129 overs); Madawa Warnapura 100 (198); Dinuka Hettiarachchi 6/133 (43 overs)
221/9 (48 overs); Ashen Silva 80* (141); Upul Indrasiri 5/70 (18 overs)

Match drawn
FTZ Sports Complex, Katunayake
Umpires: Eric Kannangara and Ranjith Vishwakula

- Chilaw Marians Cricket Club won the toss and elected to bat.
- Nuwan Chamara (Bloomfield Cricket and Athletic Club) made his first-class debut.

4–6 March 2016
Scorecard

Sri Lanka Army Sports Club	v	Sri Lanka Ports Authority Cricket Club
202 (66.3 overs); Sulan Jayawardene 62 (167); Chaminda Bandara 9/68 (18.3 overs)		131 (37 overs); Wanidu Hasaranga 29* (39); Seekkuge Prasanna 7/55 (17 overs)
496 (120.5 overs); Asela Gunaratne 160 (171); Chanaka Komasaru 3/103 (21.5 overs)		207/4 (26 overs); Ashan Priyanjan 70 (47); Ajantha Mendis 2/67 (10 overs)

Match drawn
Colombo Cricket Club Ground, Colombo
Umpires: Kamal Indrajith and Kapil Kottahachchi

- Sri Lanka Ports Authority Cricket Club won the toss and elected to field.
- Andawaththa Tyronne (Sri Lanka Ports Authority Cricket Club) made his first-class debut.

4–6 March 2016
Scorecard

Saracens Sports Club	v	Badureliya Sports Club
374 (85.4 overs); Gamindu Kanishka 102 (166); Kasun Rajitha 4/116 (23 overs)		304 (96.4 overs); Hasantha Fernando 70 (87); Sachithra Perera 6/99 (29.4 overs)
382 (71.4 overs); Gamindu Kanishka 178 (191); Lassana Perera 4/21 (6.2 overs)		21/1 (7 overs); Imran Butt 18* (24); Geeth Kumara 1/12 (2 overs)

Match drawn
Army Ground, Panagoda
Umpires: Chaminda Hathurusingha and Nilantha Semasinghe

- Badureliya Sports Club won the toss and elected to field.

=== Super Eight ===
11–14 February 2016
Scorecard

Tamil Union Cricket and Athletic Club	v	Sinhalese Sports Club
238 (77.3 overs); Dhananjaya de Silva 66 (97); Tharindu Ratnayake 6/89 (23 overs)		167 (57.2 overs); Kaushal Silva 50 (106); Ramith Rambukwella 4/34 (11 overs)
538/7d (106.2 overs); Tharanga Paranavitana 132 (231); Kasun Madushanka 2/94 (18 overs)		295 (76.2 overs); Dimuth Karunaratne 95 (182); Dhananjaya de Silva 4/67 (22 overs)

Tamil Union Cricket and Athletic Club won by 314 runs
Moors Sports Club Ground, Colombo
Umpires: Lyndon Hannibal and Rohitha Kottahachchi

- Sinhalese Sports Club won the toss and elected to field.

11–14 February 2016
Scorecard

Moors Sports Club	v	Nondescripts Cricket Club
228 (75.2 overs); Kaushalya Gajasinghe 67* (161); Chaminda Vidanapathirana 3/47 (14 overs)		255 (69.3 overs); Sandun Weerakkody 70 (68); Chaturanga de Silva 3/36 (12.3 overs)
261 (82.2 overs); Sachithra Serasinghe 102 (209); Chamikara Edirisinghe 5/64 (24 overs)		211 (77.3 overs); Upul Tharanga 84 (188); Chaturanga de Silva 3/37 (13.3 overs)

Moors Sports Club won by 23 runs
Colts Cricket Club Ground, Colombo
Umpires: Deepal Gunawardene and Ravindra Kottahachchi

- Nondescripts Cricket Club won the toss and elected to field.

11–14 February 2016
Scorecard

Colts Cricket Club	v	Colombo Cricket Club
529 (103.1 overs); Dilruwan Perera 137* (114); Sachith Pathirana 4/162 (30 overs)		221 (55.4 overs); Sachith Pathirana 56 (53); Prabath Jayasuriya 5/64 (16 overs)
		155 (37.3 overs) (f/o); Kusal Mendis 34 (46); Prabath Jayasuriya 7/56 (15.3 overs)

Colts Cricket Club won by an innings and 153 runs
P Sara Oval, Colombo
Umpires: Asanga Jayasooriya and Pradeep Udawatta

- Colombo Cricket Club won the toss and elected to field.

11–14 February 2016
Scorecard

Ragama Cricket Club	v	Galle Cricket Club
344 (100 overs); Lahiru Thirimanne 153 (192); Charitha Buddhika 5/57 (19 overs)		209 (51 overs); Tillakaratne Sampath 68 (66); Amila Aponso 5/37 (15 overs)
252 (69.2 overs); Sameera de Zoysa 82 (109); Gayan Sirisoma 4/40 (18 overs)		388/5 (114.4 overs); Chamara Silva 158* (168); Udara Jayasundera 1/51 (9 overs)

Galle Cricket Club won by 5 wickets
Sinhalese Sports Club Ground, Colombo
Umpires: Kapil Kottahachchi and Prageeth Rambukwella

- Galle Cricket Club won the toss and elected to field.
- Thissa Sanjeewa (Ragama Cricket Club) made his first-class debut.

18–21 February 2016
Scorecard

Tamil Union Cricket and Athletic Club	v	Nondescripts Cricket Club
369 (95.3 overs); Jeevan Mendis 132 (193); Chamikara Edirisinghe 3/55 (7.3 overs)		282 (64.3 overs); Upul Tharanga 111 (139); Shaminda Eranga 5/63 (16 overs)
275/6d (77 overs); Tharanga Paranavitana 75 (147); Tharindu Kaushal 3/89 (25 overs)		193 (59 overs); Pawan Wickramasinghe 46 (106); Shaminda Eranga 4/36 (13 overs)

Tamil Union Cricket and Athletic Club won by 169 runs
R Premadasa Stadium, Colombo
Umpires: Rohitha Kottahachchi and Prageeth Rambukwella

- Nondescripts Cricket Club won the toss and elected to field.

18–21 February 2016
Scorecard

Sinhalese Sports Club	v	Moors Sports Club
544/8d (131.3 overs); Kaushal Silva 211 (313); Chaturanga de Silva 2/61 (12.3 overs)		302 (73.2 overs); Denuwan Rajakaruna 81 (67); Danushka Gunathilaka 3/61 (22.2 overs)
360 (78.2 overs); Mahela Udawatte 96 (104); Tharindu Ratnayake 4/127 (27.2 overs)		119/2 (20.1 overs); Dimuth Karunaratne 43* (56); Sachithra Serasinghe 2/51 (10 overs)

Sinhalese Sports Club won by 8 wickets
Bloomfield Cricket and Athletic Club Ground, Colombo
Umpires: Lyndon Hannibal and Seekkuge Sarathkumara

- Sinhalese Sports Club won the toss and elected to bat.

18–21 February 2016
Scorecard

Galle Cricket Club	v	Colombo Cricket Club
344 (73.5 overs); Harsha Vithana 91 (115); Dilesh Gunaratne 4/68 (15 overs)		202 (43.3 overs); Lasith Abeyratne 59 (88); Suraj Randiv 5/70 (16.3 overs)
202 (53.2 overs); Nisal Randika 58 (57); Lakshan Sandakan 3/26 (14.2 overs)		150 (37.4 overs); Lasith Abeyratne 60* (72); Suraj Randiv 4/62 (14.4 overs)

Galle Cricket Club won by 194 runs
Colts Cricket Club Ground, Colombo
Umpires: Asanga Jayasooriya and Ravindra Kottahachchi

- Galle Cricket Club won the toss and elected to bat.

18–21 February 2016
Scorecard

Ragama Cricket Club	v	Colts Cricket Club
264 (76.1 overs); Lahiru Milantha 61 (104); Mohamed Ali 4/60 (14 overs)		276 (66.4 overs); Sadeera Samarawickrama 103 (182); Chathura Peiris 5/69 (16 overs)
358/8d (94 overs); Lahiru Milantha 141 (213); Dilruwan Perera 3/97 (31 overs)		254 (60.5 overs); Priyamal Perera 96 (166); Nilanka Premaratne 3/48 (9 overs)

Ragama Cricket Club won by 92 runs
Sinhalese Sports Club Ground, Colombo
Umpires: Deepal Gunawardene and Pradeep Udawatta

- Colts Cricket Club won the toss and elected to field.

25–28 February 2016
Scorecard

Colts Cricket Club	v	Tamil Union Cricket and Athletic Club
218 (65.4 overs); Pasindu Lakshanka 52 (88); Jeevan Mendis 5/63 (19.4 overs)		255 (70.5 overs); Manoj Sarathchandra 72* (81); Mohamed Ali 3/21 (6 overs)
338 (89.2 overs); Hashan Dumindu 112* (237); Dhananjaya de Silva 3/47 (17 overs)		304/5 (64.5 overs); Dhananjaya de Silva 113 (155); Dilruwan Perera 3/90 (26 overs)

Tamil Union Cricket and Athletic Club won by 5 wickets
Moors Sports Club Ground, Colombo
Umpires: Ravindra Kottahachchi and Seekkuge Sarathkumara

- Colts Cricket Club won the toss and elected to bat.

25–28 February 2016
Scorecard

Galle Cricket Club	v	Moors Sports Club
300 (103.3 overs); Harsha Vithana 84 (154); Sanitha de Mel 3/53 (21 overs)		579/9d (157.4 overs); Mahela Udawatte 205 (333); Gayan Sirisoma 3/163 (43 overs)
234/5 (77 overs); Nisal Randika 61 (95); Vimukthi Perera 3/49 (13 overs)

Match drawn
R Premadasa Stadium, Colombo
Umpires: Kapil Kottahachchi and Raveendra Wimalasiri

- Galle Cricket Club won the toss and elected to bat.

25–28 February 2016
Scorecard

Sinhalese Sports Club	v	Colombo Cricket Club
595/6d (133 overs); Kaushal Silva 225 (318); Akila Jayasundera 3/112 (22 overs)		430 (87.4 overs); Woshantha Silva 80* (100); Kasun Madushanka 5/82 (18 overs)
237/4d (34.4 overs); Dimuth Karunaratne 70* (59); Lakshan Sandakan 4/70 (12 overs)		350 (76.5 overs); Ron Chandraguptha 140 (148); Tharindu Ratnayake 5/106 (22 overs)

Sinhalese Sports Club won by 52 runs
Colts Cricket Club Ground, Colombo
Umpires: Nilan De Silva and Rohitha Kottahachchi

- Sinhalese Sports Club won the toss and elected to bat.
- Danush Peiris (Colombo Cricket Club) and Tiran Wijesooriya (Sinhalese Sports Club) both made their first-class debuts.

25–28 February 2016
Scorecard

Nondescripts Cricket Club	v	Ragama Cricket Club
417 (97.1 overs); Sandun Weerakkody 130 (128); Sahan Nanayakkare 6/80 (25.1 overs)		647 (191.2 overs); Roshen Silva 225* (361); Sachintha Peiris 3/97 (40 overs)
312/3 (44 overs); Upul Tharanga 139 (113); Tilaksha Sumanasiri 1/34 (5 overs)

Match drawn
P Sara Oval, Colombo
Umpires: Gamini Dissanayake and Pradeep Udawatta

- Nondescripts Cricket Club won the toss and elected to bat.
- Sachintha Peiris (Nondescripts Cricket Club) made his first-class debut.

3–6 March 2016
Scorecard

Ragama Cricket Club	v	Sinhalese Sports Club
665 (170.3 overs); Udara Jayasundera 318 (448); Kasun Madushanka 2/143 (27.3 overs)		362 (106.3 overs); Danushka Gunathilaka 97 (160); Amila Aponso 4/68 (28 overs)
238 (61.3 overs); Lahiru Milantha 96 (132); Thilina Kandamby 3/24 (9 overs)		26/1 (3 overs); Kaushal Silva 13* (11); Nuwan Karunaratne 1/19 (2 overs)

Match drawn
R Premadasa Stadium, Colombo
Umpires: Lyndon Hannibal and Rohitha Kottahachchi

- Sinhalese Sports Club won the toss and elected to field.

3–6 March 2016
Scorecard

Galle Cricket Club	v	Tamil Union Cricket and Athletic Club
343 (87.3 overs); Tillakaratne Sampath 80 (103); Jeevan Mendis 4/74 (21 overs)		191 (51.1 overs); Jeevan Mendis 82 (79); Suraj Randiv 6/70 (21 overs)
126 (38.3 overs); Charitha Buddhika 28 (33); Suranga Lakmal 4/20 (6.3 overs)		279/4 (54.2 overs); Dhananjaya de Silva 124 (131); Gayan Sirisoma 2/74 (12 overs)

Tamil Union Cricket and Athletic Club won by 6 wickets
Colts Cricket Club Ground, Colombo
Umpires: Nilan De Silva and Asanga Jayasooriya

- Galle Cricket Club won the toss and elected to bat.

3–6 March 2016
Scorecard

Colts Cricket Club	v	Moors Sports Club
266 (57 overs); Sadeera Samarawickrama 117 (136); Vimukthi Perera 5/52 (14 overs)		597 (167 overs); Shanuka Dulaj 128 (187); Mohamed Ali 6/98 (28 overs)
300 (72.4 overs); Priyamal Perera 95 (119); Chaturanga de Silva 7/70 (21.4 overs)

Moors Sports Club won by an innings and 31 runs
Nondescripts Cricket Club Ground, Colombo
Umpires: Pradeep Udawatta and Raveendra Wimalasiri

- Colts Cricket Club won the toss and elected to bat.

3–6 March 2016
Scorecard

Nondescripts Cricket Club	v	Colombo Cricket Club
510 (119.5 overs); Jehan Mubarak 197 (308); Lakshan Sandakan 5/146 (49.5 overs)		312 (67.3 overs); Kusal Mendis 78 (98); Anuk Fernando 3/20 (6.3 overs)
309/6d (50.3 overs); Jehan Mubarak 81 (62); Sachith Pathirana 3/115 (16.3 overs)		191 (42.1 overs); Ron Chandraguptha 53 (66); Tharindu Kaushal 6/87 (14.1 overs)

Nondescripts Cricket Club won by 316 runs
Moors Sports Club Ground, Colombo
Umpires: Gamini Dissanayake and Ravindra Kottahachchi

- Nondescripts Cricket Club won the toss and elected to bat.
- Shaluka Silva (Colombo Cricket Club) made his first-class debut.
