= 2016 Super T20 Provincial team squads =

This is a list of the squads participated for the 2016 Super T20 Provincial Tournament.

== Colombo Commandos ==
Colombo Commandos current squad
Players
Coaches

Nat.	Name	Age	Pos.	Bat st.	Bowl st.
(Sri Lanka)	Milinda Siriwardene (c)	30	All-rounder	LHB	LO
(Sri Lanka)	Dhananjaya de Silva	24	Batsman	RHB	LOS
(Sri Lanka)	Niroshan Dickwella	22	Wicket-keeper Batsman	LHB
(Sri Lanka)	Shaminda Eranga	29	Bowler	RHB	RMF
(Sri Lanka)	Vishwa Fernando	24	All-rounder	RHB	LMF
(Sri Lanka)	Upul Indrasiri	33	Bowler	LHB	LO
(Sri Lanka)	Shehan Jayasuriya	24	All-rounder	LHB	ROS
(Sri Lanka)	Shehen Jayawardene	32	All-rounder	RHB	RFM
(Sri Lanka)	Lahiru Madushanka	23	All-rounder	RHB	RFM
(Sri Lanka)	Ramesh Mendis	20	All-rounder	RHB	ROS
(Sri Lanka)	Nadeera Nawela	31	Batsman	RHB	RFM
(Sri Lanka)	Rashmika Opatha	18	All-rounder	RHB	ROS
(Sri Lanka)	Kasun Rajitha	22	All-rounder	RHB	RMF
(Sri Lanka)	Ramith Rambukwella	24	Opening batsman	LHB	ROS
(Sri Lanka)	Lasanda Rukmal	25	All-rounder	RHB	RMF
(Sri Lanka)	Sadeera Samarawickrama	20	Wicket-keeper	RHB
(Sri Lanka)	Dasun Shanaka	24	All-rounder	RHB	RMF

== Galle Guardians ==
Galle Guardians current squad
Players
Coaches

Nat.	Name	Age	Pos.	Bat st.	Bowl st.
(Sri Lanka)	Dinesh Chandimal (Captain)	26	Wicket-keeper batsman	RHB
(Sri Lanka)	Amila Aponso	22	Batsman	RHB	LO
(Sri Lanka)	Tilaksha Sumanasiri	21	Batsman	RHB	ROS
(Sri Lanka)	Dushmantha Chameera	24	Bolwer	RHB	RF
(Sri Lanka)	Dilhara Lokuhettige	35	All-rounder	RHB	RMF
(Sri Lanka)	Hashan Dumindu	20	Bowler	RHB	ROS
(Sri Lanka)	Udara Jayasundera	25	All-rounder	LHB	LB
(Sri Lanka)	Prabath Jayasuriya	24	All-rounder	RHB	LO
(Sri Lanka)	Suraj Randiv	30	All-rounder	RHB	ROS
(Sri Lanka)	Shalika Karunanayake	28	All-rounder	RHB	RMF
(Sri Lanka)	Ajantha Mendis	30	Bowler	RHB	ROS
(Sri Lanka)	Lahiru Milantha	21	Wicket-keeper	LHB
(Sri Lanka)	Dilshan Munaweera	26	Opening batsman	RHB	ROS
(Sri Lanka)	Primosh Perera	26	Bastman	LHB	LB
(Sri Lanka)	Isuru Udana	27	Bowler	RHB	RMF
(Sri Lanka)	Jeffrey Vandersay	25	Bowler	RHB	LB
(Sri Lanka)	Kithuruwan Vithanage	24	All-rounder	LHB	LB

== Hambantota Troopers ==
Hambantota Troopers current squad
Players
Coaches

Nat.	Name	Age	Pos.	Bat st.	Bowl st.
(Sri Lanka)	Tillakaratne Dilshan (Captain)	39	All-rounder	RHB	ROS
(Sri Lanka)	Binura Fernando	20	Bowler	RHB	RMF
(Sri Lanka)	Lahiru Gamage	27	Bowler	RHB	RMF
(Sri Lanka)	Angelo Jayasinghe	22	Batsman	RHB	RLB
(Sri Lanka)	Dimuth Karunaratne	27	Opening batsman	LHB	RMF
(Sri Lanka)	Jehan Mubarak	35	All-rounder	LHB	ROS
(Sri Lanka)	Sachith Pathirana	26	All-rounder	LHB	LO
(Sri Lanka)	Dilruwan Perera	33	All-rounder	RHB	ROS
(Sri Lanka)	Seekkuge Prasanna	30	All-rounder	RHB	RLB
(Sri Lanka)	Ashan Priyanjan	26	All-rounder	RHB	ROS
(Sri Lanka)	Malinda Pushpakumara	28	Batsman	RHB	LO
(Sri Lanka)	Denuwan Rajakaruna	25		RHB
(Sri Lanka)	Lakshina Rodrigo	18	Wicket-keeper	RHB
(Sri Lanka)	Lakshan Sandakan	24	Bowler	RHB	LWS
(Sri Lanka)	Alankara Asanka Silva	30	All-rounder	RHB	ROS
(Sri Lanka)	Andy Solomons	28		RHB	RFM
(Sri Lanka)	Thilan Thushara	34	Bowler	LHB	LFM
(Sri Lanka)	Sandun Weerakkody	22	Wicket-keeper Batsman	LHB

== Kandy Crusaders ==
Kandy Crusaders current squad
Players
Coaches

Nat.	Name	Age	Pos.	Bat st.	Bowl st.
(Sri Lanka)	Lahiru Thirimanne (c)	26	Batsman	LHB	LMF
(Sri Lanka)	Lasith Ambuldeniya		Bowler	LHB	LO
(Sri Lanka)	Minod Bhanuka	20	Opening Batsman	LHB
(Sri Lanka)	Akila Dananjaya	22	Bowler	LHB	ROB
(Sri Lanka)	Dilhara Fernando	36	Bowler	RHB	RF
(Sri Lanka)	Anuk Fernando	20	All-rounder	LHB	RMF
(Sri Lanka)	Danushka Gunathilaka	24	All-rounder	LHB	RMF
(Sri Lanka)	Saliya Saman	30	All-rounder	RHB	RMF
(Sri Lanka)	Suranga Lakmal	28	Bowler	RHB	RMF
(Sri Lanka)	Jeevan Mendis	33	All-rounder	LHB	LB
(Sri Lanka)	Angelo Perera	25	All-rounder	RHB	LO
(Sri Lanka)	Thisara Perera	26	All-rounder	LHB	RMF
(Sri Lanka)	Chathura Randunu	31	All-rounder	LHB	LO
(Sri Lanka)	Manoj Sarathchandra	22	Wicket-keeper	RHB
(Sri Lanka)	Sachithra Senanayake	30	All-rounder	RHB	ROB

== Kurunegala Warriors ==
Kurunegala Warriors current squad
Players
Coaches

Nat.	Name	Age	Pos.	Bat st.	Bowl st.
(Sri Lanka)	Mahela Udawatte (c)	29	Batsman	LHB	ROB
(Sri Lanka)	Lasith Abeyratne	22	Wicket-keeper	LHB
(Sri Lanka)	Rumesh Buddika	25	Batsman	LHB	ROB
(Sri Lanka)	Chaturanga de Silva	26	Batsman	LHB	LO
(Sri Lanka)	Nuwan Pradeep	29	Bowler	RHB	RMF
(Sri Lanka)	Oshada Fernando	23	All-rounder	RHB	LB
(Sri Lanka)	Shehan Fernando	22	All-rounder	RHB	ROB
(Sri Lanka)	Asela Gunaratne	30	All-rounder	RHB	RMF
(Sri Lanka)	Imran Khan	23	Bowler	LHB	RMF
(Sri Lanka)	Ishan Jayaratne	26	All-rounder	RHB	RMF
(Sri Lanka)	Chamara Kapugedera	28	All-rounder	RHB	RMF
(Sri Lanka)	Tharindu Kaushal	22	Bowler	RHB	ROB
(Sri Lanka)	Maduka Liyanapathiranage	24	All-rounder	RHB	ROB
(Sri Lanka)	Kasun Madushanka	24	Bowler	RHB	RMF
(Sri Lanka)	Kusal Mendis	20	Batsman	RHB
(Sri Lanka)	Upul Tharanga	30	Batsman	LHB
