= Hewawasam =

Hewawasam is a surname. Notable people with the surname include:

- Janitha Hewawasam (born 1983), Sri Lankan cricketer
- Sachin Hewawasam (born 1994), Sri Lankan cricketer
