= Sandaruwan =

Sandaruwan is both a given name and a surname. Notable people with the name include:

- Sandaruwan Rodrigo (born 1997), Sri Lankan cricketer
- Amila Sandaruwan (born 1984), Sri Lankan cricketer
- Buddika Sandaruwan (born 1989), Sri Lankan cricketer
- Danushka Sandaruwan (born 1993), Sri Lankan cricketer
- Lahiru Sandaruwan (born 1991), Sri Lankan cricketer
- Ravija Sandaruwan (born 1992), Sri Lankan cricketer
- Shehan Sandaruwan (born 1996), Sri Lankan cricketer
