= Wijesooriya =

Wijesooriya is a surname. Notable people with the surname include:

- Raminda Wijesooriya (born 1998), Sri Lankan cricketer
- Tiran Wijesooriya (born 1994), Sri Lankan cricketer
