= Cricket at the 2010 South Asian Games =

- Dates: 31 January – 7 February 2010
- Administrator: South Asia Olympic Council
- Cricket format: T20 (Under-21s)
- Tournament format(s): Round-robin & playoffs
- Host: Bangladesh
- Champions: Bangladesh (1st title)
- Participants: 5
- Matches: 12
- Most runs: (Sri Lanka) Ashan Priyanjan (211)
- Most wickets: (Bangladesh) Subashis Roy (Pakistan) Kamran Hussain (10)

Cricket was included for the first time at the 2010 South Asian Games, hosted by Dhaka, Bangladesh. A men's 20-over tournament was played from 31 January to 7 February 2010.

The tournament was contested by five of the eight members of the South Asian Sports Council, with squads restricted to players aged 21 or under. Two venues were used – the Shahid Kamruzzaman Stadium in Rajshahi and the Sher-e-Bangla National Stadium in Dhaka. Bangladesh, captained by Mithun Ali, defeated Sri Lanka in the final to claim the gold medal, while Pakistan defeated Nepal in a play-off for the bronze medal. The leading run-scorer at the tournament was Sri Lanka's Ashan Priyanjan (211 runs), while Bangladesh's Subashis Roy and Pakistan's Kamran Hussain were the joint leading wicket-takers, with 10 wickets each.

== Eligibility ==
The teams for the South Asian Games had to consist of players who were under the age of 21 as of January 28, 2010.

== Venues ==
Rajshahi	Dhaka
Shaheed Qamaruzzaman Stadium	Sher-e-Bangla National Cricket Stadium
Capacity: 15,000	Capacity: 26,000
	Sher-e-Bangla National Cricket Stadium

Venues of 2010 South Asian Games

== Squads ==
Five countries sent teams to the tournament – Bangladesh, the Maldives, Nepal, Pakistan, and Sri Lanka. Of those, Bangladesh, Pakistan and Sri Lanka were full members of the International Cricket Council (ICC), while Nepal was an associate member and the Maldives were an affiliate. In March 2009, it was reported that Afghanistan, Bhutan, and India would also send teams, but this did not eventuate.

Bangladesh	Maldives	Nepal	Pakistan	Sri Lanka
Mithun Ali (c); Anamul Haque; Ariful Haque; Asif Ahmed; Emon Ahmed; Nasir Hossain; Nazmul Islam; Rony Talukdar; Jubair Rahman; Sabbir Rahman; Subashis Roy; Sunzamul Islam; Tanveer Haider	Ahmed Hassan (c); Ahmed Ameel; Akram Mohamed; Hassan Ibrahim; Hassan Rasheed; Husham Ibrahim; Ismail Shayyal; Jilwaz Rasheed; Maskoor Ibrahim; Mihusan Hamid; Mohamed Azzum; Muhavith Ganee	Gyanendra Malla (c); Pradeep Airee; Prithu Baskota; Binod Bhandari; Amrit Bhattarai; Naresh Budayair; Akash Gupta; Bhuvan Karki; Subash Khakurel; Anil Mandal; Sunny Pun; Chandra Sawad; Rupesh Shrivastava	Umar Amin (c); Adil Amin; Ahsan Jamil; Ali Asad; Ali Waqas; Gulraiz Sadaf; Hasan Dar; Junaid Khan; Kamran Hussain; Mohammad Rameez; Nayyer Abbas; Rameez Alam; Shoaib Khaliq; Taimur Ali	Ashan Priyanjan (c); Dinesh Chandimal; Ishan Jayaratne; Navin Kavikara; Nisham Mazahir; Dilshan Munaweera; Sachith Pathirana; Angelo Perera; Kusal Perera; Thisara Perera; Lahiru Thirimanne; Imesh Udayanga

== Group stage ==
=== Points table ===
Qualified for the final.
Qualified for the bronze medal play-off.

Team	Pld	W	L	T	Pts	NRR
Bangladesh	4	3	1	0	6	+3.338
Sri Lanka	4	3	1	0	6	+2.772
Pakistan	4	3	1	0	6	+1.490
Nepal	4	1	3	0	2	–2.057
Maldives	4	0	4	0	0	–7.154

=== Fixtures ===
31 January
Scorecard

Nepal; 80/7 (20 overs)	v	Bangladesh; 83/2 (9.3 overs)

Bangladesh won by 8 wickets
Shahid Kamruzzaman Stadium, Rajshahi

1 February
Scorecard

Sri Lanka; 166/8 (20 overs)	v	Nepal; 102/3 (20 overs)

Sri Lanka won by 64 runs
Shahid Kamruzzaman Stadium, Rajshahi

1 February
Scorecard

Maldives; 88/7 (20 overs)	v	Pakistan; 89/0 (9.4 overs)

Pakistan won by 10 wickets
Sher-e-Bangla National Stadium, Dhaka

2 February
Scorecard

Sri Lanka; 165/6 (20 overs)	v	Bangladesh; 147 (19.5 overs)

Sri Lanka won by 18 runs
Shahid Kamruzzaman Stadium, Rajshahi

3 February
Scorecard

Pakistan; 173/2 (20 overs)	v	Nepal; 82/8 (20 overs)

Pakistan won by 91 runs
Sher-e-Bangla National Stadium, Dhaka

4 February
Scorecard

Maldives; 26 (15.5 overs)	v	Bangladesh; 30/2 (2.2 overs)

Bangladesh won by 8 wickets
Sher-e-Bangla National Stadium, Dhaka

4 February
Scorecard

Sri Lanka; 99 (18.4 overs)	v	Pakistan; 100/4 (18.5 overs)

Pakistan won by 6 wickets
Sher-e-Bangla National Stadium, Dhaka

5 February
Scorecard

Sri Lanka; 220/3 (20 overs)	v	Maldives; 73/5 (20 overs)

Sri Lanka won by 147 runs
Sher-e-Bangla National Stadium, Dhaka

5 February
Scorecard

Bangladesh; 156/6 (20 overs)	v	Pakistan; 104 (17.3 overs)

Bangladesh won by 52 runs
Sher-e-Bangla National Stadium, Dhaka

6 February
Scorecard

Maldives; 55 (16.4 overs)	v	Nepal; 58/0 (7 overs)

Nepal won by 10 wickets
Sher-e-Bangla National Stadium, Dhaka

== Finals ==
=== Bronze medal play-off ===
7 February
Scorecard

Nepal; 147/6 (20 overs)	v	Pakistan; 148/8 (19.3 overs)
Pradeep Airee 52* (45); Kamran Hussain 2/21 (4 overs)		Rameez Alam 33* (28); Chandra Sawad 3/19 (3 overs)

Pakistan won by 2 wickets
Sher-e-Bangla National Stadium, Dhaka

- Nepal won the toss and elected to bat.

=== Final ===
7 February
Scorecard

Bangladesh; 157/7 (20 overs)	v	Sri Lanka; 151 (19.5 overs)
Anamul Haque 43 (38); Sachith Pathirana 2/22 (4 overs)		Lahiru Thirimanne 39 (34); Sabbir Rahman 4/31 (3.5 overs)

Bangladesh won by 6 runs
Sher-e-Bangla National Stadium, Dhaka

- Bangladesh won the toss and elected to bat.

== Statistics ==
=== Most runs ===
The top five run-scorers are included in this table, ranked by runs scored and then by batting average.

Player	Team	Runs	Inns	Avg	Highest	100s	50s
Ashan Priyanjan	Sri Lanka	211	5	52.75	92*	0	1
Mithun Ali	Bangladesh	127	5	25.40	41	0	0
Umar Amin	Pakistan	116	5	29.00	53	0	1
Dilshan Munaweera	Sri Lanka	110	5	22.00	63	0	1
Ali Asad	Pakistan	105	4	35.00	45*	0	0

Source: ESPNcricinfo

=== Most wickets ===
The top five wicket-takers are listed in this table, ranked by wickets taken and then by bowling average.

Player	Team	Overs	Wkts	Ave	SR	Econ	BBI
Subashis Roy	Bangladesh	19.0	10	10.10	11.4	5.31	4/6
Kamran Hussain	Pakistan	19.0	10	11.30	11.4	5.94	3/25
Sabbir Rahman	Bangladesh	6.4	7	5.42	5.7	5.70	4/31
Sunzamul Islam	Bangladesh	18.0	7	14.57	15.4	5.66	3/22
Thisara Perera	Sri Lanka	18.0	7	16.28	15.4	6.33	2/26

Source: ESPNcricinfo

== Final standing ==
Rank	Team	Pld	W	L	T	NR
1st place, gold medalist(s)	Bangladesh	5	4	1	0	0
2nd place, silver medalist(s)	Sri Lanka	5	3	2	0	0
3rd place, bronze medalist(s)	Pakistan	5	4	1	0	0
4	Nepal	5	1	4	0	0
5	Maldives	4	0	4	0	0
