= Denuwan =

Denuwan is a masculine given name. Notable people with the name include:

- Denuwan Fernando (born 1989), Sri Lankan cricketer
- Denuwan Rajakaruna (born 1990), Sri Lankan cricketer
