= Kulasekara =

Kulasekara is a Sinhalese surname that may refer to the following notable people:

- Kavindu Kulasekara (born 1995), Sri Lankan cricketer
- Kosala Kulasekara (born 1985), Sri Lankan cricketer
- Kulasekara Pandyan, King of the Pandyan dynasty
- Maravarman Kulasekara Pandyan I, King of the Pandyan dynasty
- Nuwan Kulasekara (born 1982), Sri Lankan cricketer
