= Chamod =

Chamod is a given name. Notable people with the name include:

- Chamod Battage, Sri Lankan cricketer
- Chamod Piumal (born 1995), Sri Lankan cricketer
- Chamod Silva (born 1995), Sri Lankan cricketer
- Chamod Wickramasuriya (born 1999), Sri Lankan cricketer
