= New Zealand cricket team in Sri Lanka in 2009 =

	New Zealand	Sri Lanka
- Dates: 18 August 2009 – 19 September 2009
Captains	Daniel Vettori	Kumar Sangakkara

Test series
- Result: Sri Lanka won the 2-match series 2–0
Most runs	Daniel Vettori (272)	Thilan Samaraweera (347)
Most wickets	Daniel Vettori (10)	Muttiah Muralitharan (13)
- Player of the series: Thilan Samaraweera (SL)

Twenty20 International series
- Results: New Zealand won the 2-match series 2–0
Most runs	Ross Taylor (76)	Kumar Sangakkara (82)
Most wickets	Jacob Oram (4)	Lasith Malinga (3)
- Player of the series: Jesse Ryder (NZ)

The New Zealand cricket team toured Sri Lanka for a 2-match Test series and 2 Twenty20 Internationals from 7 August 2009 to 16 September 2009. In addition, New Zealand, Sri Lanka, and India played in a tri-series during this time. Subsequently, Sri Lanka won the series 2–0.

== Test series ==
=== 1st Test ===
18 – 22 August
(scorecard)

Sri Lanka	v	New Zealand
452 (117.4 overs); Thilan Samaraweera 159 (277); Chris Martin 4/77 [23]		299 (116 overs); Tim McIntosh 69 (226); Muttiah Muralitharan 4/73 [42]
259/4d (49 overs); Tillakaratne Dilshan 123* (208); Iain O'Brien 1/45 [8]		210 (71.5 overs); Daniel Vettori 67 (122); Muttiah Muralitharan 3/88 [27]

Sri Lanka won by 202 runs
Paikiasothy Saravanamuttu Stadium, Colombo, Sri Lanka
Umpires: Daryl Harper (AUS) & Nigel Llong (ENG)
Player of the match: Tillakaratne Dilshan

- New Zealand won the toss and chose to field.

=== 2nd Test ===
26 – 30 August
(scorecard)

Sri Lanka	v	New Zealand
416 (130.3 overs); Thilan Samaraweera 143 (240); Jeetan Patel 4/78 (20 overs)		234 (77.4 overs); Ross Taylor 81 (155); Rangana Herath 3/70 (34 overs)
311/5d (85.2 overs); Kumar Sangakkara 109 (175); Daniel Vettori 2/62 (24 overs)		397 (123.5 overs); Daniel Vettori 140 (189); Rangana Herath 5/139 (48 overs)

Sri Lanka won by 96 runs
Sinhalese Sports Club Ground, Colombo, Sri Lanka
Umpires: Daryl Harper (AUS) & Nigel Llong (ENG)
Player of the match: Mahela Jayawardene

- Sri Lanka won the toss and chose to bat first

== Twenty20 Series ==
=== 1st T20 ===
2 September 2009
19:00 (D/N)
Scorecard

New Zealand; 141/8 (20 overs)	v	Sri Lanka; 138/9 (20 overs)
Ross Taylor 60 (45); Lasith Malinga 2/21 (4 overs)		Tillakaratne Dilshan 57 (28); Jacob Oram 3/33 (4 overs)

New Zealand won by 3 runs
R. Premadasa Stadium, Colombo
Umpires: Asoka de Silva (SRI) and Kumar Dharmasena (SRI)
Player of the match: Daniel Vettori (NZL)

- New Zealand won the toss and elected to bat.
- Gihan Rupasinghe (SL) made his T20I debut.
- Jacob Oram took the second ever hat-trick in a T20I match.

=== 2nd T20 ===
4 September 2009
19:00 (D/N)
Scorecard

New Zealand; 170/4 (20 overs)	v	Sri Lanka; 148/8 (20 overs)
Jesse Ryder 52 (37); Sanath Jayasuriya 2/22 (4 overs)		Kumar Sangakkara 69 (50); Shane Bond 3/18 (4 overs)

New Zealand won by 22 runs
R. Premadasa Stadium, Colombo
Umpires: Gamini Silva (SRI) and Tyron Wijewardene (SRI)
Player of the match: Jesse Ryder (NZL)

- New Zealand won the toss and elected to bat.

== Tour Matches ==
=== First Class:Sri Lanka Cricket Development XI v New Zealanders ===
7 – 9 August
(scorecard)

Sri Lanka Cricket Development XI	v	New Zealanders
159 (60.4 overs); Dinesh Chandimal 64 (131); Daryl Tuffey 3/41 (10.4 overs)		493 (124.3 overs); Daniel Vettori 106 (132); Jeewan Mendis 4/91 (25 overs)
257/6 (75 overs); Nadeera Nawela 64* (131); Jacob Oram 3/32 (12 overs)

Match Drawn
Colts Cricket Club Ground, Colombo, Sri Lanka
Umpires: Gamini Dissanayake and Sena Nandiweera (both SRI)

=== First Class:Sri Lanka Cricket XI v New Zealanders ===
12 – 14 August
(scorecard)

New Zealanders (New Zealand)	v	Sri Lanka Cricket XI
297 (93.3 overs); Ross Taylor 75 (151); Seekkuge Prasanna 3/66 (28 overs)		330 (86.3 overs); Dinesh Chandimal 109 (234); Jeetan Patel 3/81 (25 overs)
240/6 (70 overs); Ross Taylor 58 (77); Dammika Prasad 2/28 (7 overs)

Match Drawn
Nondescripts Cricket Club Ground, Colombo, Sri Lanka
Umpires: Sagara Gallage & Rohitha Kottahachchi (both SRI)

=== List A:Sri Lanka A v New Zealanders ===
6 September 2009
(scorecard)

Sri Lanka A 234 (47.5 overs)	v	New Zealanders; 173 (41.5 overs)
Lahiru Thirimanne 51 (72); Daryl Tuffey 5/35 (9.5 overs)		Jacob Oram 39 (56); Muthumudalige Pushpakumara 3/36 (10 overs)

Sri Lanka A won by 61 runs
Sinhalese Sports Club Ground, Colombo, Sri Lanka
Umpires: Dushantha Ekanayake & Prageeth Rambukwella (both SRI)

=== List A:Sri Lankan XI v New Zealanders ===
16 September 2009

Sri Lankan XI (Sri Lanka)	v	New Zealanders

This match is not yet confirmed
TBC

== Media coverage ==
Television

- Arab Digital Distribution (live) – Middle East
- Ten Sports (live) – India, Sri Lanka and Pakistan

== See also ==
Tri-Series in Sri Lanka in 2009-10
