= Adeesha =

Adeesha is a Sinhalese given name. In some cases, due to the fact that the family name is traditionally written at the back, given names may be found at the end of the name. Notable people with the name include:

- Adeesha Nanayakkara (born 1991), Sri Lankan cricketer
- Adeesha Thilanchana (born 1995), Sri Lankan cricketer
- Sahan Adeesha (born 1994), Sri Lankan cricketer
