= Randika =

Randika is both a given name and a surname. Notable people with the name include:

- Randika Galhenage (born 1978), Sri Lankan cricketer
- Ashan Randika (born 1993), Sri Lankan cricketer
- Nisal Randika (born 1982), Sri Lankan cricketer
- Vishad Randika (born 1997), Sri Lankan cricketer
