= Halambage =

Halambage is both a given name and a surname. Notable people with the name include:

- Halambage Premasiri (1962–2016), Sri Lankan first-class cricketer
- Vishen Halambage (born 2005), Sri Lankan cricketer
- Thanura Halambage (born 1993), Sri Lankan cricketer
