= Emon Ahmed =

Bangladeshi cricketer

Domestic team information
- Years: Team
- 2008/09–2010/11: Dhaka Division

Career statistics
Competition	FC	LA	T20
Matches	9	1	1
Runs scored	48	11	9
Batting average	9.60	11.00	–
100s/50s	0/0	0/0	0/0
Top score	11*	11	9*
Balls bowled	1,123	36	12
Wickets	14	0	0
Bowling average	43.42	–	–
5 wickets in innings	0	–	–
10 wickets in match	0	–	–
Best bowling	2/18	–	–
Catches/stumpings	3/–	0/–	0/–
Medal record
Representing Bangladesh
Men's Cricket
South Asian Games
Gold medal – first place	2010 Dhaka	Team
- Source: CricketArchive, 8 January 2022

Emon Ahmed (date of birth unknown) is a Bangladeshi cricketer. He made his debut in October 2008 for Dhaka Division. He played nine first-class matches from the 2008/09 season to the 2010/11 season, as well as a single Twenty20 match in the 2009/10 season and a List A match for Mohammedan Sporting Club in 2016.
