= Nuwan Chamara =

Sri Lankan cricketer (born 1983)

Personal information
- Born: 29 April 1983 (age 43); Colombo, Sri Lanka
- Source: Cricinfo, 17 March 2017

Nuwan Chamara (born 29 April 1983) is a Sri Lankan cricketer. He made his first-class debut for Bloomfield Cricket and Athletic Club in the 2015–16 Premier League Tournament on 4 March 2016.
