= Ahsan Jamil =

Pakistani cricketer

Personal information
- Full name: Mirza Ahsan Jamil Baig
- Born: 6 October 1992 (age 34); Karachi, Pakistan
- Batting: Right-handed
- Bowling: Slow left-arm wrist-spin

Domestic team information
- Years: Team
- 2007: Pakistan Customs
- 2008: Karachi Zebras
- 2015: Karachi Dolphins
- 2016: Habib Bank
Medal record
Men's Cricket
Representing Pakistan
South Asian Games
Bronze medal – third place	2010 Dhaka	Team
- Source: CricketArchive, 17 February 2016

Mirza Ahsan Jamil Baig (born 6 October 1992) is a Pakistani cricketer who has played for several teams in Pakistani domestic cricket. He is a slow left-arm wrist-spin bowler.

Ahsan made his first-class cricket at the age of 15, playing for Pakistan Customs in the 2007–08 season of the Quaid-i-Azam Trophy. Later in the season, he also appeared for the Karachi Zebras in the ABN-AMRO Cup, a limited-overs competition. Ahsan was subsequently selected in the Pakistani under-19s squad for the 2008 Under-19 World Cup (as its youngest member), although he did not play a game at the tournament. Two years later, he represented the Pakistan under-21s in the cricket tournament at the 2010 South Asian Games in Bangladesh, winning a bronze medal. In May 2015, Ahsan returned to the highest level of Pakistani domestic cricket for the first time since 2008, playing a single match for the Karachi Dolphins in the 2015 Haier Super 8 T20 Cup. For the 2015–16 season, he joined Habib Bank Limited's one-day team.
