= Shaluka Silva =

Sri Lankan cricketer (born 1995)

Personal information
- Full name: Ethige Shaluka Deemantha Silva
- Born: 10 May 1995 (age 31); Colombo, Sri Lanka
- Source: ESPNcricinfo, 16 January 2017

Shaluka Silva (born 10 May 1995) is a Sri Lankan cricketer. He made his first-class debut for Colombo Cricket Club in the 2015–16 Premier League Tournament on 3 March 2016. He made his List A debut for Colombo District in the 2016–17 Districts One Day Tournament on 31 March 2017. He made his Twenty20 debut for Bloomfield Cricket and Athletic Club in the 2018–19 SLC Twenty20 Tournament on 18 February 2019.
