= Deshan Withanage =

Sri Lankan cricketer (born 1997)

Personal information
- Full name: Ahangama Withanage Deshan Sandaruwan
- Born: 21 February 1997 (age 29); Matara, Sri Lanka
- Source: Cricinfo, 15 March 2017

Deshan Withanage (born 21 February 1997) is a Sri Lankan cricketer. He made his first-class debut for Galle Cricket Club in the 2015–16 Premier League Tournament on 11 December 2015.
