= Hasan Dar =

Pakistani cricketer

Personal information
- Full name: Hasan Ahmed Dar
- Born: 18 July 1989 (age 37); Lahore, Pakistan
- Batting: Right-handed
- Bowling: Right-arm medium-fast

Domestic team information
- Years: Team
- 2009–2013: Lahore Ravi
- 2009–2011: Lahore Shalimar
- 2010–2011: Lahore Eagles
- 2012–2015: Lahore Lions
Medal record
Men's Cricket
Representing Pakistan
South Asian Games
Bronze medal – third place	2010 Dhaka	Team
- Source: CricketArchive, 17 February 2016

Hasan Ahmed Dar (born 18 July 1989) is a Pakistani cricketer who has played for several Lahore-based teams in Pakistani domestic cricket. He is a right-arm pace bowler and is the son of field hockey player Tauqeer Dar

Hasan made his first-class debut in February 2009, playing for Lahore Ravi in the 2008–09 Quaid-i-Azam Trophy. He switched to Lahore Shalimar the following season, and took 16 wickets from five games for the team, including 7/53 against Habib Bank. Hasan also played two limited-overs games for the Lahore Eagles later in the season. In January 2010, he represented the Pakistan under-21s in the cricket tournament at the 2010 South Asian Games, winning a bronze medal. Hasan took 5/43 against Abbottabad in the 2010–11 Quaid-i-Azam Trophy, and 6/67 against Hyderabad the following season. He returned to Lahore Ravi for the 2013–14 season, and when that team was abolished switched to the Lahore Lions for the 2014–15 season.
