= Thuduwage Kumara =

Sri Lankan cricketer (born 1990)

Personal information
- Born: 4 October 1990 (age 36); Meegahathanna, Sri Lanka
- Source: Cricinfo, 15 March 2017

Thuduwage Kumara (born 4 October 1990) is a Sri Lankan cricketer. He made his first-class debut for Sri Lanka Army Sports Club in the 2015–16 Premier League Tournament on 26 December 2015.
