= Shoaib Khaliq =

Pakistani cricketer

Mohammad Shoaib Khaliq
Personal information
- Full name: Mohammad Shoaib Khaliq
- Born: April 20, 1991 (age 35); Islamabad, Punjab, Pakistan
- Batting: Left-handed
- Bowling: Right arm bowler

Domestic team information
- Years: Team
- 2010/11-2018/19: Islamabad
- 2014/15: Pakistan Under-21s

Career statistics
| Competition | FC |
|---|---|
| Matches | 7 |
| Runs scored | 75 |
| Batting average | 5.76 |
| 100s/50s | 0/0 |
| Top score | 21 |
| Catches/stumpings | 3/0 |
Medal record
Men's Cricket
Representing Pakistan
South Asian Games
| Bronze medal – third place | 2010 Dhaka | Team |
- Source: Cricinfo, 5 December 2025

Mohammad Shoaib Khaliq (born 20 April 1991) is a Pakistani cricketer who has played for Islamabad in Pakistani domestic cricket. He is a left-handed opening batsman.

In January 2010, Shoaib represented the Pakistan under-21s in the cricket tournament at the 2010 South Asian Games, winning a bronze medal. His previous highest level of competition had been for the Islamabad under-19s. Shoaib eventually made his first-class debut for the Islamabad senior team in October 2010, against Pakistan International Airlines in the 2010–11 Quaid-i-Azam Trophy. He has played only irregularly for the team since his debut.
