= Fabian Fernando =

Sri Lankan cricketer (born 1995)

Personal information
- Full name: Fabian Vivian Fernando
- Born: 10 June 1995 (age 31); Colombo, Sri Lanka
- Batting: Right-handed
- Bowling: Right-arm medium
- Source: ESPNcricinfo, 30 July 2020

Fabian Fernando (born 10 June 1995) is a Sri Lankan cricketer. He made his Twenty20 debut for Chilaw Marians Cricket Club in the 2015-16 AIA Premier T20 Tournament on 5 January 2016. He made his first-class debut for Lankan Cricket Club in Tier B of the 2016–17 Premier League Tournament on 6 January 2017.
