= Iran Indika =

Sri Lankan cricketer (born 1989)

Personal information
- Born: 30 June 1989 (age 37); Nagoda, Sri Lanka
- Source: Cricinfo, 17 March 2017

Iran Indika (born 30 June 1989) is a Sri Lankan cricketer. He made his first-class debut for Sri Lanka Army Sports Club in the 2015–16 Premier League Tournament on 15 January 2016.
