= Malinga de Silva =

Sri Lankan cricketer (born 1995)

Personal information
- Full name: Uralakalasi Nayana Malinga de Silva
- Born: 2 August 1995 (age 31); Colombo, Sri Lanka
- Source: Cricinfo, 15 March 2017

Uralakalasi Nayana Malinga de Silva (born 2 August 1995) is a Sri Lankan cricketer. He made his first-class debut for Bloomfield Cricket and Athletic Club in the 2015–16 Premier League Tournament on 11 December 2015. He made his List A debut for Sri Lanka Ports Authority Cricket Club in the 2017–18 Premier Limited Overs Tournament on 18 March 2018.
