= Sri Lankan cricket team in New Zealand in 2015–16 =

International cricket tour

	New Zealand	Sri Lanka
- Dates: 10 December 2015 – 10 January 2016
Captains	Brendon McCullum (Tests and 1st and 2nd ODIs); Kane Williamson (3rd, 4th and 5th ODIs and T20Is)	Angelo Mathews (Tests and ODIs); Dinesh Chandimal (T20Is)

Test series
- Result: New Zealand won the 2-match series 2–0
Most runs	Kane Williamson (268)	Dinesh Chandimal (192)
Most wickets	Tim Southee (13)	Dushmantha Chameera (12)

One Day International series
- Results: New Zealand won the 5-match series 3–1
Most runs	Martin Guptill (331)	Milinda Siriwardana (117)
Most wickets	Matt Henry (13)	Nuwan Kulasekara (4)

Twenty20 International series
- Results: New Zealand won the 2-match series 2–0
Most runs	Martin Guptill (121)	Angelo Mathews (85)
Most wickets	Grant Elliott (5)	Nuwan Kulasekara (2)

The Sri Lanka cricket team toured New Zealand in December 2015 and January 2016 to play two Test matches, five One Day Internationals (ODIs) and two Twenty20 Internationals (T20Is).

New Zealand won the Test series 2–0, the ODI series 3–1 and the T20I series 2–0. With the T20I defeat, Sri Lanka lost their number one spot in the T20I rankings after 16 months.

== Squads ==
Tests		ODIs		T20Is	
New Zealand	Sri Lanka	New Zealand	Sri Lanka	New Zealand	Sri Lanka
Brendon McCullum (c); Ross Taylor (vc); Trent Boult; Doug Bracewell; Mark Craig; Martin Guptill; Tom Latham; Tim Southee; BJ Watling (wk); Kane Williamson; Mitchell Santner; Neil Wagner	Angelo Mathews (c); Dushmantha Chameera; Dinesh Chandimal (wk); Rangana Herath; Udara Jayasundera; Dimuth Karunaratne; Suranga Lakmal; Kusal Mendis (wk); Dilruwan Perera; ~~Kusal Perera~~; Nuwan Pradeep; ~~Dhammika Prasad~~; Milinda Siriwardana; Jeffrey Vandersay; Kithuruwan Vithanage; Vishwa Fernando; Kaushal Silva (wk)	Brendon McCullum (c); Trent Boult; Doug Bracewell; Martin Guptill; Tom Latham; Matt Henry; Mitchell McClenaghan; Adam Milne; Henry Nicholls; Luke Ronchi (wk); Mitchell Santner; Ish Sodhi; Tim Southee; Ross Taylor; Kane Williamson; George Worker	Angelo Mathews (c); Dushmantha Chameera; Dinesh Chandimal (wk); Tillakaratne Dilshan; Danushka Gunathilaka; Chamara Kapugedera; Suranga Lakmal; ~~Lasith Malinga~~; Ajantha Mendis; ~~Kusal Perera~~; Thisara Perera; Nuwan Pradeep; ~~Dhammika Prasad~~; Sachithra Senanayake; Milinda Siriwardana; Lahiru Thirimanne; Jeffrey Vandersay; Nuwan Kulasekara	Kane Williamson (c); Corey Anderson; Trent Boult; Grant Elliott; Martin Guptill; Matt Henry; Mitchell McClenaghan; Adam Milne; Colin Munro; Luke Ronchi (wk); Mitchell Santner; Ish Sodhi; ~~Tim Southee~~; Ross Taylor	~~Lasith Malinga (c)~~; Dinesh Chandimal (c) (wk); Dushmantha Chameera; Tillakaratne Dilshan; Shehan Jayasuriya; Chamara Kapugedera; Nuwan Kulasekara; Angelo Mathews; ~~Kusal Perera (wk)~~; Thisara Perera; Sachithra Senanayake; Milinda Siriwardana; Isuru Udana; Jeffrey Vandersay; Kithuruwan Vithanage; Danushka Gunathilaka; Suranga Lakmal

Vishwa Fernando was added to Sri Lanka's Test squad as a replacement for Dhammika Prasad after Prasad sustained a back injury in a tour match. Nuwan Kulasekara was named as Prasad's replacement in the ODI squad. Kaushal Silva was added to Sri Lanka's Test squad for Kusal Perera after Kusal tested positive for a banned substance due to suspect in doping violation by the International Cricket Council (ICC). Lasith Malinga was originally named as the T20I captain for Sri Lanka, but suffered a knee injury and was replaced by Dinesh Chandimal. Danushka Gunathilaka and Suranga Lakmal were also added to Sri Lanka's T20I squad. Trent Boult returned for the final ODI in place of Matt Henry while George Worker was dropped. Tim Southee was ruled out of the T20I series because of a foot injury and was replaced by Matt Henry.

== Tour match ==
=== Three Day: New Zealand Cricket Board President's XI vs Sri Lankans ===
3–5 December
Scorecard

Sri Lankans	v	New Zealand Cricket Board President's XI
193 (75.2 overs); Dimuth Karunaratne 93 (177); Tim Johnston 4/43 (16 overs)		399/8d (84.3 overs); Ben Smith 81 (108); Dushmantha Chameera 4/57 (10.3 overs)
226/6 (71 overs); Udara Jayasundera 63 (153); James Baker 2/21 (12 overs)

Match drawn
Queenstown Events Centre, Queenstown
Umpires: Phil Jones (NZ) and Derek Walker (NZ)

- New Zealand Board President's XI won the toss and elected to field.

== Test series ==
=== 1st Test ===
10–14 December
Scorecard

New Zealand	v	Sri Lanka
431 (96.1 overs); Martin Guptill 156 (234); Nuwan Pradeep 4/112 (23.1 overs)		294 (117.1 overs); Dimuth Karunaratne 84 (198); Tim Southee 3/71 (27 overs)
267/3d (65.4 overs); Tom Latham 109* (180); Rangana Herath 2/62 (11.4 overs)		282 (95.2 overs); Dinesh Chandimal 58 (132); Tim Southee 3/52 (21 overs)

New Zealand won by 122 runs
University Oval, Dunedin
Umpires: Richard Kettleborough (Eng) and Nigel Llong (Eng)
Player of the match: Martin Guptill (NZ)

- Sri Lanka won the toss and elected to field.
- Rain stopped play at 17:05 on Day 4 and no play was possible for the rest of the day.
- Udara Jayasundera (SL) made his Test debut.
- New Zealand wicket-keeper BJ Watling took his 100th Test dismissal when Kusal Mendis was caught by him in the 1st innings.

=== 2nd Test ===
18–22 December
Scorecard

Sri Lanka	v	New Zealand
292 (80.1 overs); Angelo Mathews 77 (125); Tim Southee 3/63 (21 overs)		237 (79.4 overs); Martin Guptill 50 (77); Dushmantha Chameera 5/47 (13 overs)
133 (36.3 overs); Kusal Mendis 46 (90); Tim Southee 4/26 (12.3 overs)		189/5 (54.3 overs); Kane Williamson 108* (164); Dushmantha Chameera 4/68 (17 overs)

New Zealand won by 5 wickets
Seddon Park, Hamilton
Umpires: Nigel Llong (Eng) and Paul Reiffel (Aus)
Player of the match: Kane Williamson (NZ)

- New Zealand won the toss and elected to field.
- Rain stopped play at 16:29 on Day 1 and no play was possible for the rest of the day.
- Brendon McCullum (NZ) played in his 99th consecutive Test since his debut, beating the previous record of 98 set by AB de Villiers (SA).
- This was the 13th consecutive home Test for New Zealand without defeat, equalling their previous longest undefeated streak at home (March 1987 to March 1991).
- Kane Williamson broke the record for the most Test runs in a calendar year by a New Zealand player (1172 runs).

== ODI series ==
=== 1st ODI ===
26 December
11:00
Scorecard

Sri Lanka; 188 (47 overs)	v	New Zealand; 191/3 (21 overs)
Milinda Siriwardana 66 (82); Matt Henry 4/49 (10 overs)		Martin Guptill 79 (56); Milinda Siriwardana 2/45 (5 overs)

New Zealand won by 7 wickets
Hagley Oval, Christchurch
Umpires: Michael Gough (Eng) and Phil Jones (NZ)
Player of the match: Matt Henry (NZ)

- Sri Lanka won the toss and elected to bat.
- Henry Nicholls (NZ) made his ODI debut.

=== 2nd ODI ===
28 December
11:00
Scorecard

Sri Lanka; 117 (27.4 overs)	v	New Zealand; 118/0 (8.2 overs)
Nuwan Kulasekara 19 (24); Matt Henry 4/33 (9.4 overs)		Martin Guptill 93* (30)

New Zealand won by 10 wickets
Hagley Oval, Christchurch
Umpires: Richard Illingworth (Eng) and Derek Walker (NZ)
Player of the match: Martin Guptill (NZ)

- Sri Lanka won the toss and elected to bat.
- Jeffrey Vandersay (SL) made his ODI debut.
- Martin Guptill's fifty off 17 balls is the fastest ODI fifty by a New Zealand cricketer and equal second fastest of all time (with Sanath Jayasuriya and Kusal Perera).
- New Zealand had the second highest run rate (14.16) in ODI history.
- New Zealand's winning margin by balls remaining (250) was the third highest for a 10-wicket win in ODIs.

=== 3rd ODI ===
31 December
11:00
Scorecard

New Zealand; 276/8 (50 overs)	v	Sri Lanka; 277/2 (46.2 overs)
Kane Williamson 59 (73); Dushmantha Chameera 2/38 (10 overs)		Tillakaratne Dilshan 91 (92); Mitchell McClenaghan 1/39 (9 overs)

Sri Lanka won by 8 wickets
Saxton Oval, Nelson
Umpires: Billy Bowden (NZ) and Michael Gough (Eng)
Player of the match: Danushka Gunathilaka (SL)

- New Zealand won the toss and elected to bat.
- Tillakaratne Dilshan broke the record for the most ODI runs in a calendar year by a Sri Lankan opener (1207 runs).

=== 4th ODI ===
2 January
11:00
Scorecard

New Zealand; 75/3 (9 overs)	v	Sri Lanka
Martin Guptil 27 (14); Nuwan Kulasekara 1/4 (1 over)

No result
Saxton Oval, Nelson
Umpires: Billy Bowden (NZ) and Richard Illingworth (Eng)

- Sri Lanka won the toss and elected to field.
- The start of the match was delayed by rain and the game reduced to 24 overs per side.
  Rain stopped play at 16:23 and no play was possible for the rest of the game.

=== 5th ODI ===
5 January
11:00
Scorecard

New Zealand; 294/5 (50 overs)	v	Sri Lanka; 258 (47.1 overs)
Martin Guptill 102 (109); Nuwan Kulasekara 3/53 (10 overs)		Angelo Mathews 95 (116); Matt Henry 5/40 (10 overs)

New Zealand won by 36 runs
Bay Oval, Mount Maunganui
Umpires: Billy Bowden (NZ) and Michael Gough (Eng)
Player of the match: Matt Henry (NZ)

- Sri Lanka won the toss and elected to field.
- Matt Henry took his 2nd ODI five-wicket haul.
- Tillakaratne Dilshan played his 300th ODI innings. He is the 4th Sri Lankan and 12th overall to play more than 300 innings.
- Angelo Mathews became the 10th Sri Lankan to score 4000 runs in ODIs.

== T20I series ==
=== 1st T20I ===
7 January
15:00
Scorecard

New Zealand; 182/4 (20 overs)	v	Sri Lanka; 179/9 (20 overs)
Martin Guptill 58 (34); Nuwan Kulasekara 2/26 (4 overs)		Danushka Gunathilaka 46 (29); Trent Boult 3/21 (4 overs)

New Zealand won by 3 runs
Bay Oval, Mount Maunganui
Umpires: Phil Jones (NZ) and Derek Walker (NZ)
Player of the match: Trent Boult (NZ)

- Sri Lanka won the toss and elected to field.
- Danushka Gunathilaka (SL) made his T20I debut.

=== 2nd T20I ===
10 January
15:00
Scorecard

Sri Lanka; 142/8 (20 overs)	v	New Zealand; 147/1 (10 overs)
Angelo Mathews 81* (49); Grant Elliott 4/22 (4 overs)		Martin Guptill 63 (25); Thisara Perera 1/26 (2 overs)

New Zealand won by 9 wickets
Eden Park, Auckland
Umpires: Billy Bowden (NZ) and Phil Jones (NZ)
Player of the match: Colin Munro (NZ)

- New Zealand won the toss and elected to field.
- Martin Guptill became the second New Zealander and fourth overall to reach 1,500 Twenty20 International runs.
- Colin Munro scored the second fastest fifty of all time and the fastest by a New Zealander (14 balls).
- Sri Lanka lost their number one spot in Twenty20 International team rankings after 16 months.
