= Sachin Peiris =

Sri Lankan cricketer (born 1992)

Personal information
- Full name: Thatila Pitige Minoj Sachin Peiris
- Born: 7 October 1992 (age 34); Colombo, Sri Lanka
- Batting: Right-handed
- Bowling: Right-arm medium-fast
- Source: ESPNcricinfo, 26 July 2020

Sachin Peiris (born 7 October 1992) is a Sri Lankan cricketer. He made his first-class debut for Saracens Sports Club in the 2010–11 Premier Trophy on 25 March 2011. He made his List A debut for Badureliya Sports Club in the 2012–13 Premier Limited Overs Tournament on 15 December 2012. He made his Twenty20 debut for Badureliya Sports Club in the 2015-16 AIA Premier T20 Tournament on 22 December 2015.
