= Koshan Dhanushka =

Sri Lankan cricketer (born 1993)

Personal information
- Full name: Hangili Gurunhelage Koshan Danuska Jayawickrema
- Born: 4 March 1993 (age 33)
- Source: Cricinfo, 30 March 2021

Koshan Danuska (born 4 March 1993) is a Sri Lankan cricketer. He made his Twenty20 debut on 5 January 2016, for Ragama Cricket Club in the 2015–16 AIA Premier T20 Tournament. In August 2021, he was named in the SLC Greys team for the 2021 SLC Invitational T20 League tournament. However, prior to the first match, he failed a fitness test.
