= Nimesh Perera (cricketer, born 1982) =

Sri Lankan cricketer (born 1982)

Personal information
- Born: 9 January 1982 (age 44); Colombo, Sri Lanka
- Batting: Right-handed
- Bowling: Right-arm medium
- Source: Cricinfo, 14 March 2017

Nimesh Perera (born 9 January 1982) is a Sri Lankan cricketer. He made his first-class debut in 2001 and has played in 100 matches. He made his Twenty20 debut on 17 August 2004, for Tamil Union Cricket and Athletic Club in the 2004 SLC Twenty20 Tournament.

== See also ==
- List of Chilaw Marians Cricket Club players
