= Thissa Sanjeewa =

Sri Lankan cricketer (born 1992)

Personal information
- Full name: Manathunga Arachchige Thissa Sanjeewa Bandara
- Born: 1 May 1992 (age 34); Nawagaththegama, Sri Lanka
- Source: Cricinfo, 18 March 2017

Thissa Sanjeewa (born 1 May 1992) is a Sri Lankan cricketer. He made his first-class debut for Ragama Cricket Club in the 2015–16 Premier League Tournament on 11 February 2016.
