= Shehan Sandaruwan =

Sri Lankan cricketer (born 1996)

Personal information
- Born: 4 August 1996 (age 30); Ragama, Sri Lanka
- Source: Cricinfo, 13 March 2017

Shehan Sandaruwan (born 4 August 1996) is a Sri Lankan cricketer. He made his first-class debut for Ragama Cricket Club in the 2015–16 Premier League Tournament on 4 December 2015. He made his Twenty20 debut for Ragama Cricket Club in the 2018–19 SLC Twenty20 Tournament on 18 February 2019. He made his List A debut on 9 April 2021, for Ragama Cricket Club in the 2020–21 Major Clubs Limited Over Tournament.
