= Ishan Nilaksha =

Sri Lankan cricketer (born 1994)

Personal information
- Full name: Dombagaha Pathirage Ishan Nilaksha Peiris
- Born: 9 May 1994 (age 32); Colombo, Sri Lanka
- Source: Cricinfo, 17 March 2017

Ishan Nilaksha (born 9 May 1994) is a Sri Lankan cricketer. He made his first-class debut for Saracens Sports Club in the 2013–14 Premier Trophy on 8 April 2014.
