= Ravindra Palleguruge =

Sri Lankan cricketer (born 1985)

Personal information
- Born: 6 April 1985 (age 41); Galle, Sri Lanka
- Batting: Right-handed
- Bowling: Slow left-arm Orthodox
- Role: Bowler
- Source: Cricinfo, 17 March 2017

Ravindra Palleguruge (born 6 April 1985) is a Sri Lankan cricketer. He made his first-class debut for Singha Sports Club in the 2005–06 Premier Trophy on 14 January 2006.
