= Harsha Rajapaksha =

Sri Lankan cricketer (born 1995)

Personal information
- Born: 8 April 1995 (age 31); Matara, Sri Lanka
- Batting: Left-handed
- Bowling: Slow left arm orthodox
- Source: Cricinfo, 13 March 2017

Harsha Rajapaksha (born 8 April 1995) is a Sri Lankan cricketer. He made his first-class debut for Sri Lanka Ports Authority Cricket Club in the 2015–16 Premier League Tournament on 26 December 2015.
