= Mohamed Ali (Sri Lankan cricketer) =

Sri Lankan cricketer (born 1993)

Personal information
- Full name: Mohamed Ali Waheed
- Born: 2 July 1993 (age 33); Lahore, Pakistan
- Source: Cricinfo, 18 March 2017

Mohamed Ali Waheed (born 2 July 1993) is a Sri Lankan cricketer. He made his first-class debut for Chilaw Marians Cricket Club in the 2012–13 Premier Trophy on 8 February 2013.

== See also ==
- List of Chilaw Marians Cricket Club players
