= Kaushalya Gajasinghe =

Sri Lankan cricketer (born 1991)

Personal information
- Born: 19 November 1991 (age 34); Galle, Sri Lanka
- Source: ESPNcricinfo, 7 February 2017

Kaushalya Gajasinghe (born 19 November 1991) is a Sri Lankan cricketer. He made his first-class debut for Lankan Cricket Club in the 2011–12 Premier Trophy on 10 February 2012.
