= Woshantha Silva =

Sri Lankan cricketer (born 1994)

Personal information
- Born: 16 November 1994 (age 31); Colombo, Sri Lanka
- Source: Cricinfo, 18 March 2017

Woshantha Silva (born 16 November 1994) is a Sri Lankan cricketer. He made his first-class debut for Colombo Cricket Club in the 2014–15 Premier Trophy on 26 March 2015.
