= Harith Maduwantha =

Sri Lankan cricketer (born 1994)

Personal information
- Born: 7 October 1994 (age 32); Colombo, Sri Lanka
- Source: Cricinfo, 15 March 2017

Harith Maduwantha (born 7 October 1994) is a Sri Lankan cricketer. He made his first-class debut for Sinhalese Sports Club in the 2015–16 Premier League Tournament on 4 December 2015.
