= Kavinda de Thissera =

Sri Lankan cricketer (born 1995)

Kavinda de Tissera
Personal information
- Born: 17 January 1995 (age 31); Colombo, Sri Lanka
- Batting: Right handed
- Bowling: Right arm Medium
- Role: Batsman
- Source: Cricinfo, 15 March 2017

Kavinda de Tissera (born 17 January 1995) is a Sri Lankan cricketer. He made his first-class debut for Sinhalese Sports Club in the 2015–16 Premier League Tournament on 11 December 2015. His period of captaincy heading St Peter's under 17 squad was most notable for his reputation for being one of the team's batting anchor.
