= Sanjaya Fernando =

Sri Lankan cricketer (born 1988)

Personal information
- Full name: Moratuwage Sanjaya Devapriya Fernando
- Born: 25 December 1988 (age 37); Colombo, Sri Lanka
- Source: Cricinfo, 17 August 2017

Moratuwage Sanjaya Devapriya Fernando (born 25 December 1988) is a Sri Lankan cricketer. He made his first-class debut for Moratuwa Sports Club in the 2008–09 Premier Trophy on 14 November 2008.

== See also ==
- List of Chilaw Marians Cricket Club players
