= Tiran Wijesooriya =

Sri Lankan cricketer (born 1994)

Personal information
- Born: 13 July 1994 (age 32); Colombo, Sri Lanka
- Source: Cricinfo, 18 March 2017

Tiran Wijesooriya (born 13 July 1994) is a Sri Lankan cricketer. He made his first-class debut for Sinhalese Sports Club in the 2015–16 Premier League Tournament on 25 February 2016.
