= Rameez Alam =

Pakistani cricketer (born 1988)

Personal information
- Full name: Rameez Alam
- Born: 7 December 1988 (age 37); Sahiwal, Punjab, Pakistan
- Batting: Right-handed
- Bowling: Right-arm off break
- Role: Wicket-keeper-batter

Domestic team information
- Years: Team
- Multan Tigers
- Baluchistan Bears
- State Bank of Pakistan
- Baluchistan
- Multan

Career statistics
Competition	First-class	List A	Twenty20
Matches	81	31	13
Runs scored	3,895	873	276
Batting average	30.91	33.57	30.66
100s/50s	7/19	0/6	0/1
Top score	222*	86	52*
Balls bowled	6	–	–
Wickets	0	–	–
Bowling average	–	–	–
5 wickets in innings	0	–	–
10 wickets in match	0	–	–
Best bowling	–	–	–
Catches/stumpings	64/0	14/0	1/0
- Source: Cricinfo, 1 May 2026

Rameez Alam (born 7 December 1988) is a Pakistani former cricketer. He was born in Sahiwal, Punjab, and has played domestic cricket in Pakistan for Multan, Baluchistan, State Bank of Pakistan, Baluchistan Bears and Multan Tigers.

Alam made his first-class debut for Karachi Whites against Multan in the 2007–08 Quaid-e-Azam Trophy. He later established himself as a middle-order batsman and wicket-keeper in Pakistan's domestic circuit and represented State Bank of Pakistan, Baluchistan and Multan in first-class cricket.

His breakthrough first-class innings came in the 2009–10 Quaid-e-Azam Trophy, when he scored his maiden double-century for Karachi Blues against Hyderabad. Batting through the innings, he made an unbeaten 222 from 362 balls, with 18 fours and a six, while sharing a major stand with Naved Yasin, who scored 154, as Karachi Blues declared on 538 for 6 and went on to complete a massive victory.

In List A cricket, Alam's highest score was 86 for Baluchistan Bears against Khyber Pakhtunkhwa Panthers in April 2010. In a low-scoring match at the National Stadium, Karachi, his innings was the decisive contribution in Baluchistan Bears' total of 187, which proved enough for a four-run win.

Late in his career, playing for Southern Punjab in the 2022–23 Cricket Associations Championship, Alam made one of his most important innings. After being forced to follow on against Khyber Pakhtunkhwa, he and Abdul Rehman Muzammil added an unbroken 243 for the fourth wicket, with Alam finishing unbeaten on 116 as Southern Punjab turned the match around.

Overall, Alam has played in 81 first-class matches, scoring 3,895 runs at a batting average of 30.91, with seven centuries and 19 half-centuries. In 31 List A matches, he has scored 873 runs at 33.57, with six fifties, while in 13 Twenty20 matches he has scored 276 runs, with a highest score of 52 not out.
