= Janitha Hewawasam =

Sri Lankan cricketer (born 1983)

Janitha Hewawasam (born 26 January 1983) is a Sri Lankan former first-class cricketer, active 1999–2001, who played for Panadura Sports Club. Born in Colombo, he played as a right-handed batsman and a right arm medium pace bowler. Hewawasam made a single first-class appearance for Panadura in 1999–2000 and a single List A appearance the following season. He represented Sri Lanka at the 2000 Under-17 Asia Cup competition, and, later in the same season, played in the domestic Under-23 tournament, at which Panadura finished runners-up to Sebastianites Cricket and Athletic Club.
