= Prashan Wickramasinghe =

Sri Lankan cricketer (born 1992)

Personal information
- Born: 20 July 1992 (age 34); Colombo, Sri Lanka
- Source: Cricinfo, 17 March 2017

Prashan Wickramasinghe (born 20 July 1992) is a Sri Lankan cricketer. He made his first-class debut for Sri Lanka Ports Authority Cricket Club in the 2011–12 Premier Trophy on 20 January 2012.
