= Maduka Liyanapathiranage =

Sri Lankan cricketer (born 1992)

Personal information
- Full name: Maduka Ayeshmantha Liyanapathiranage
- Born: 4 January 1992 (age 34); Colombo, Sri Lanka
- Role: All-rounder
- Source: ESPNcricinfo, 4 December 2016

Maduka Liyanapathiranage (born 4 January 1992) is a Sri Lankan cricketer. He made his first-class debut for Colombo Cricket Club in the 2011–12 Premier Trophy on 17 February 2012. In January 2016, playing for Chilaw Marians Cricket Club, he took nine wickets in an innings against Tamil Union Cricket and Athletic Club in the 2015–16 Premier League Tournament.

== See also ==
- List of Chilaw Marians Cricket Club players
