= Ashen Silva =

Sri Lankan cricketer (born 1990)

Personal information
- Full name: Weerakkodi Arachchige Ashen Mayura Silva
- Born: 12 July 1990 (age 36); Colombo, Sri Lanka
- Source: Cricinfo, 7 August 2015

Ashen Silva (born 12 July 1990) is a Sri Lankan cricketer. He has played in more than 80 first-class matches since 2011.
