= Tilaksha Sumanasiri =

Sri Lankan cricketer (born 1995)

Personal information
- Born: 20 January 1995 (age 31); Colombo, Sri Lanka
- Source: Cricinfo, 28 January 2016

Tilaksha Sumanasiri (born 20 January 1995) is a Sri Lankan cricketer who plays for Ragama Cricket Club. He made his first-class debut for Ragama Cricket Club in the 2015–16 Premier League Tournament on 18 December 2015.
