= Sachin Hewawasam =

Sri Lankan cricketer (born 1994)

Personal information
- Born: 15 June 1994 (age 32); Colombo, Sri Lanka
- Source: Cricinfo, 16 March 2017

Sachin Hewawasam (born 15 June 1994) is a Sri Lankan cricketer. He made his first-class debut for Badureliya Sports Club in the 2015–16 Premier League Tournament on 8 January 2016.
