= Kavindu Kulasekara =

Sri Lankan cricketer (born 1995)

Personal information
- Born: 20 August 1995 (age 31); Colombo, Sri Lanka
- Batting: Right-handed

Career statistics
Competition	FC	LA	T20
Matches	63	34	11
Runs scored	2,661	594	213
Batting average	33.68	25.82	21.30
100s/50s	1/18	0/4	0/1
Top score	104*	75	60
Balls bowled	216	0	0
Wickets	2	0	0
Bowling average	61.00	–	–
5 wickets in innings	0	0	0
10 wickets in match	0	0	0
Best bowling	1/10	–	–
Catches/stumpings	71/–	19/–	9/2
- Source: ESPNcricinfo, 1 April 2025

Kavindu Kulasekara (born 20 August 1995) is a Sri Lankan first-class cricketer. He was part of Sri Lanka's squad for the 2014 ICC Under-19 Cricket World Cup. He has also represented Moors Sports Club and Sinhalese Sports Club.
