= Sahan Adeesha =

Sri Lankan cricketer (born 1994)

Personal information
- Full name: Weladage Sahan Adeesha Appuhami
- Born: 24 November 1994 (age 31); Puttalam, Sri Lanka
- Source: ESPNcricinfo, 6 February 2017

Weladage Sahan Adeesha Appuhami (born 24 November 1994, mainly known as Sahan Adeesha ) is a Sri Lankan cricketer. He made his first-class debut for Badureliya Sports Club in the 2015–16 Premier League Tournament on 4 December 2015.
