= Gihan Rupasinghe =

Sri Lankan cricketer

Gihan Rupasinghe ගිහාන් රූපසිංහ
Personal information
- Full name: Rupasinghe Jayawardene Mudiyanselage Gihan Madushanka Rupasinghe
- Born: 5 March 1986 (age 40); Watupitiwala, Sri Lanka
- Batting: Left-handed
- Bowling: Right arm leg-break

International information
- National side: Sri Lanka (2009–present)
- T20I debut (cap 30): 2 September 2009 v New Zealand
- Last T20I: 4 September 2009 v New Zealand

Domestic team information
- Years: Team
- Tamil Union Cricket and Athletic Club
- Basnahira South

Career statistics
Competition	T20I
Matches	2
Runs scored	33
Batting average	16.50
100s/50s	0/0
Top score	18
Balls bowled	–
Wickets	–
Bowling average	–
5 wickets in innings	–
10 wickets in match	–
Best bowling	–
Catches/stumpings	1/–
- Source: Cricinfo, 5 September 2009

Rupasinghe Jayawardene Mudiyanselage Gihan Madushanka Rupasinghe (born March 5, 1986, in Watupitiwala) is a professional Sri Lankan T20I cricketer.

== International career ==
Rupasinghe is the 30th Twenty20 International cap for Sri Lanka. He made his T20I debut on 2 September 2009, against New Zealand.

== School and domestic career ==
He was educated at Nalanda College Colombo. Rupasinghe was OBSERVER-BATA Schoolboy Cricketer in 2006 and also became the best all-rounder in 2006. He captained Nalanda College's first XI team in 2006. Rupasinghe played for Sri Lanka School's under-17 team, at the Asian Schools Cricket Tournament, held in Sri Lanka in 2002; and toured with the Sri Lanka under-19 cricket team to Pakistan in 2005. He was included to the 2004 Under-19 Cricket World Cup Squad as well.

In November 2021, he was selected to play for the Colombo Stars following the players' draft for the 2021 Lanka Premier League.
