= Nisham Mazahir =

Sri Lankan cricketer

Personal information
- Full name: Mohammed Nisham Mazahir
- Born: 24 March 1989 (age 37); Colombo, Sri Lanka
- Batting: Left-handed
- Bowling: Right-arm medium

Domestic team information
- Years: Team
- 2007–2009: Moors Sports Club
- 2009: Ragama Cricket Club
- 2013: Chilaw Marians Cricket Club
- 2015–2016: Colombo Cricket Club
Medal record
Men's Cricket
Representing Sri Lanka
South Asian Games
Silver medal – second place	2010 Dhaka	Team
- Source: CricketArchive, 17 February 2016

Mohammed Nisham Mazahir (born 24 March 1989) is a Sri Lankan cricketer who has played for several teams in Sri Lankan domestic cricket. He is a left-handed top-order batsman.

Mazahir was born in Colombo and attended St. Thomas' College, Mount Lavinia. A former Sri Lanka under-19s player, he made his List A debut in December 2007, playing for the Moors Sports Club against the Colts Cricket Club. His first-class debut came the following year, for the same team. Mazahir switched to Ragama Cricket Club for the 2009–10 season, and in his fourth game for his new club, against Sinhalese Sports Club, scored a maiden first-class hundred, 104 from 141 balls. In January 2010, he represented the Sri Lankan under-21s in the cricket tournament at the 2010 South Asian Games, winning a silver medal. Mazahir switched to Chilaw Marians for the 2012–13 season, and to Colombo Cricket Club for the 2015–16 season.
