= Umesh Karunaratne =

Sri Lankan cricketer (born 1989)

Personal information
- Born: 19 January 1989 (age 37); Sri Jayawardenepura, Sri Lanka
- Source: ESPNcricinfo, 28 September 2016

Umesh Karunaratne (born 19 January 1989) is a Sri Lankan first-class cricketer. He was part of Sri Lanka's squad for the 2008 Under-19 Cricket World Cup.

== See also ==
- List of Chilaw Marians Cricket Club players
