= Thanura Halambage =

Sri Lankan cricketer (born 1993)

Personal information
- Born: 27 December 1993 (age 32); Galle, Sri Lanka
- Source: Cricinfo, 14 March 2017

Thanura Halambage (born 27 December 1993) is a Sri Lankan cricketer. He made his first-class debut for Chilaw Marians Cricket Club in the 2015–16 Premier League Tournament on 8 January 2016.

== See also ==
- List of Chilaw Marians Cricket Club players
