= Nisal Randika =

Sri Lankan cricketer (born 1982)

Personal information
- Full name: Kankana Gamage Don Nisal Randika
- Born: 30 July 1982 (age 44); Colombo, Sri Lanka
- Source: Cricinfo, 15 March 2017

Nisal Randika (born 30 July 1982) is a Sri Lankan cricketer. He made his first-class debut in the 2001–02 season and has played more than 100 matches. He made his Twenty20 debut on 17 August 2004, for Colombo Cricket Club in the 2004 SLC Twenty20 Tournament.
