= Shalika Karunanayake =

Sri Lankan cricketer (born 1987)

Personal information
- Born: 14 February 1987 (age 39); Kurunegala, Sri Lanka
- Batting: Right-handed
- Bowling: Right-arm medium fast
- Role: Allrounder
- Source: Cricinfo, 28 January 2016

Shalika Karunanayake (born 14 February 1987) is a Sri Lankan first-class cricketer who plays for Sri Lanka Army Sports Club.
