= Upul Indrasiri =

Sri Lankan cricketer (born 1982)

Personal information
- Born: 2 November 1982 (age 44); Colombo, Sri Lanka
- Source: Cricinfo, 28 January 2016

Upul Indrasiri (born 2 November 1982) is a Sri Lankan first-class cricketer who has played for Bloomfield Cricket and Athletic Club. He made his Twenty20 debut on 17 August 2004, for Ragama Cricket Club in the 2004 SLC Twenty20 Tournament. He was the leading wicket-taker for Negombo Cricket Club in the 2018–19 Premier League Tournament, with 38 dismissals in nine matches.
