= Lahiru Sandaruwan =

Sri Lankan cricketer (born 1991)

Personal information
- Full name: Hettiarchchi Lahiru Sandaruwan
- Born: 14 October 1991 (age 35); Colombo, Sri Lanka
- Source: Cricinfo, 16 March 2017

Lahiru Sandaruwan (born 14 October 1991) is a Sri Lankan cricketer. He made his first-class debut for Galle Cricket Club in the 2015–16 Premier League Tournament on 8 January 2016.
