= Chamod Piumal =

Sri Lankan cricketer (born 1995)

Personal information
- Full name: Pemaththu Hewage Chamod Piumal
- Born: 5 November 1995 (age 31)
- Source: Cricinfo, 2 March 2018

Chamod Piumal (born 5 November 1995) is a Sri Lankan cricketer. He made his first-class debut for Sri Lanka Police Sports Club in Tier B of the 2017–18 Premier League Tournament on 28 December 2017. He made his Twenty20 debut for Sri Lanka Police Sports Club in the 2017–18 SLC Twenty20 Tournament on 1 March 2018. He made his List A debut for Sri Lanka Police Sports Club in the 2017–18 Premier Limited Overs Tournament on 12 March 2018.
