= Manjula de Zoysa =

Sri Lankan cricketer (born 1983)

Personal information
- Born: 11 July 1983 (age 43); Beruwala, Sri Lanka
- Source: ESPNcricinfo, 16 December 2016

Manjula de Zoysa (born 11 July 1983) is a Sri Lankan cricketer. He made his first-class debut for Singha Sports Club in the 2003–04 Premier Trophy on 28 February 2004.
