= Andy Solomons =

Sri Lankan cricketer (born 1987)

Personal information
- Born: 18 September 1987 (age 39); Colombo, Sri Lanka
- Source: Cricinfo, 29 January 2016

Andy Solomons (born 18 September 1987) is a Sri Lankan former first-class cricketer who plays for Colombo Cricket Club. In April 2018, he was named in Galle's squad for the 2018 Super Provincial One Day Tournament.
