= Denuwan Rajakaruna =

Sri Lankan cricketer (born 1990)

Personal information
- Born: 30 September 1990 (age 36); Galle, Sri Lanka
- Source: Cricinfo, 28 January 2016

Denuwan Rajakaruna (born 30 September 1990) is a Sri Lankan first-class cricketer who plays for Moors Sports Club.
