= Udara Jayasundera =

Sri Lankan cricketer (born 1991)

Personal information
- Full name: Madurawelage Don Aladuna John Udara Supeksha Jayasundera
- Born: 3 January 1991 (age 35); Minuwangoda, Sri Lanka
- Batting: Left-handed
- Bowling: Leg break
- Role: Batsman

International information
- National side: Sri Lanka
- Test debut (cap 133): 10 December 2015 v New Zealand
- Last Test: 18 December 2015 v New Zealand

Domestic team information
- Years: Team
- Ragama Cricket Club
- Sri Lanka Navy Sports Club

Career statistics
Competition	Test	FC	LA	T20
Matches	2	98	61	55
Runs scored	30	6,814	1,663	914
Batting average	7.50	41.04	29.17	19.44
100s/50s	0/0	17/36	2/10	0/3
Top score	26	318	148	81*
Balls bowled	42	1,677	1,023	383
Wickets	0	27	39	27
Bowling average	–	50.81	21.97	16.55
5 wickets in innings	–	0	1	0
10 wickets in match	–	0	0	0
Best bowling	–	3/30	6/37	4/16
Catches/stumpings	2/–	58/–	19/–	12/–
- Source: Cricinfo, 28 July 2022

Madurawelage Don Udara Supeksha Jayasundera (born 3 January 1991), more commonly known as Udara Jayasundera, is a Sri Lankan Test cricketer. He is a left-handed batsman and an occasional legbreak bowler. He is a past student of Ananda College, Colombo.

== Career ==
Jayasundera played for Sri Lanka Board President's XI in a tour match against West Indians in October 2015, top scoring with 142 runs.

He made his Test debut on 10 December 2015 against New Zealand. He had a poor debut in the match, where he was only able to score a single run in the first innings and 3 runs in the second innings. Sri Lanka lost the match by 122 runs at the end.

In November 2021, he was selected to play for the Kandy Warriors following the players' draft for the 2021 Lanka Premier League.
