= Kasun Madushanka =

Sri Lankan cricketer (born 1991)

Personal information
- Full name: Hewa Uluwaduge Kasun Madushanka
- Born: 16 July 1991 (age 35); Matara, Sri Lanka
- Source: ESPNcricinfo, 21 October 2016

Kasun Madushanka (born 16 July 1991) is a Sri Lankan first-class cricketer. He was selected for Sri Lanka's Test squad for their tour of Zimbabwe in October 2016, but was not picked in the team for any match. In August 2018, he was named in Galle's squad for the 2018 SLC T20 League.
