= Nadeera Nawela =

Sri Lankan cricketer (born 1984)

Personal information
- Born: 4 October 1984 (age 42); Matugama, Sri Lanka
- Batting: Right-handed
- Bowling: Right-arm fast medium
- Role: Batsman
- Source: Cricinfo, 28 January 2016

Nadeera Nawela (born 4 October 1984) is a Sri Lankan first-class cricketer who plays for Bloomfield Sports Club.
