= 2021–22 Major Clubs Limited Over Tournament =

Cricket tournament

- Dates: 27 October – 30 November 2021
- Administrator: Sri Lanka Cricket
- Cricket format: List A cricket
- Tournament format: Round-robin then knockout
- Host: Sri Lanka
- Champions: Tamil Union Cricket and Athletic Club
- Participants: 26
- Most runs: Chanaka Ruwansiri (320)
- Most wickets: Jeffrey Vandersay (24)

The 2021–22 Major Clubs Limited Over Tournament was a List A cricket competition that took place in Sri Lanka. It ran from 27 October to 30 November 2021, with twenty-six teams taking part. Eight overseas cricketers played in the tournament. Nondescripts Cricket Club were the defending champions, having won the previous year's tournament.

The tournament was heavily impacted by rain, with 85 of the 156 matches in the group stage being washed out. Nondescripts Cricket Club, Ragama Cricket Club, Sri Lanka Army Sports Club and Tamil Union Cricket and Athletic Club all qualified for the semi-finals. Both the semi-final matches were impacted by further rain, with each match going into their respective reserve days. Tamil Union Cricket and Athletic Club beat Sri Lanka Army Sports Club by 47 runs to advance to the final. The rain-affected semi-final match between Ragama Cricket Club and Nondescripts Cricket Club finished in a no result, with Ragama Cricket Club progressing to the final due to their better finish in the group stage. Tamil Union Cricket and Athletic Club won the tournament, beating Ragama Cricket Club by 36 runs in the final.

== Group stage ==
=== Group A ===
27 October 2021
Scorecard

Sri Lanka Air Force Sports Club; 140/8 (50 overs)	v	Sri Lanka Army Sports Club; 141/3 (21 overs)
Asantha Singappuli 41* (84); Gayan Chandrabose 2/23 (10 overs)		Thisara Perera 60* (29); Lasanda Rukmal 2/32 (6 overs)

Sri Lanka Army Sports Club won by 7 wickets
Sri Lanka Army Ordnance Corps International Cricket Stadium, Horana
Umpires: R P Massalage and Rohitha Kottahachchi

- Sri Lanka Army Sports Club won the toss and elected to field.
- Gayan Chandrabose (Sri Lanka Army Sports Club) and Kemira Wijenayake (Sri Lanka Air Force Sports Club) both made their List A debuts.

27 October 2021
Scorecard

Colombo Cricket Club; 230/7 (47 overs)	v	Burgher Recreation Club; 154 (38.2 overs)
Sonal Dinusha 93* (119); Malindu Shehan 2/26 (7 overs)		Shasheen Fernando 35 (59); BGS Mendis 2/16 (6.2 overs)

Colombo Cricket Club won by 76 runs
Colombo Cricket Club Ground, Colombo
Umpires: Damith Sanjeewa and Sanjeewa Fernando

- Burgher Recreation Club won the toss and elected to field.
- Amshi de Silva (Colombo Cricket Club) made his List A debut.

27 October 2021
Scorecard

Moors Sports Club	v	Lankan Cricket Club

Match abandoned
Moors Sports Club Ground, Colombo
Umpires: Asanga Jayasooriya and Ranganath Prasanna

- No toss.

27 October 2021
Scorecard

Sri Lanka Navy Sports Club; 160 (42.4 overs)	v	Kalutara Town Club; 164/8 (41.2 overs)
Madura Madushanka 37* (62); Senal de Silva 5/41 (9.4 overs)		Inshaka Siriwardena 31* (51); Anuk Fernando 3/38 (9 overs)

Kalutara Town Club won by 2 wickets
Navy Ground, Welisara
Umpires: Nilan De Silva and Shantha Fonseka

- Kalutara Town Club won the toss and elected to field.
- Asanka Manoj, Dineth Munasinghe, Kavish Kumara, Rohitha Rajapaksa (Kalutara Town Club) and Sasindu Nanayakkara (Sri Lanka Navy Sports Club) all made their List A debuts.

27 October 2021
Scorecard

Kurunegala Youth Cricket Club	v	Kandy Customs Cricket Club

Match abandoned
Welagedara Stadium, Kurunegala
Umpires: Nilantha Semasinghe and Upul Wewage

- No toss.

28 October 2021
Scorecard

Nugegoda Sports and Welfare Club; 180/9 (42.4 overs)	v	Negombo Cricket Club
Ishan Rangana 57 (76); Madawa Warnapura 4/38 (10 overs)

No result
FTZ Sports Complex, Katunayake
Umpires: Chaturan Sanjeewa and Ranjith Vishwakula

- Nugegoda Sports and Welfare Club won the toss and elected to bat.
- Mineth Premaratne and Naveen Fernando (Nugegoda Sports and Welfare Club) both made their List A debuts.

29 October 2021
Scorecard

Colombo Cricket Club; 154/9 (23 overs)	v	Negombo Cricket Club; 45/2 (10 overs)
Pavan Rathnayake 43* (40); Madawa Warnapura 3/25 (5 overs)		Dilshan Munaweera 24 (23); BGS Mendis 2/18 (3 overs)

No result
FTZ Sports Complex, Katunayake
Umpires: Chamara de Soysa and Shantha Fonseka

- Colombo Cricket Club won the toss and elected to bat.
- The match was reduced to 23 overs per side due to rain.

29 October 2021
Scorecard

Nugegoda Sports and Welfare Club; 103 (21.1 overs)	v	Kurunegala Youth Cricket Club; 104/1 (22.4 overs)
Lahiru Jayakody 34 (33); Naveen Gunawardene 5/28 (6 overs)		Dhanushka Dharmasiri 59* (61); Raveen Sayer 1/27 (5.4 overs)

Kurunegala Youth Cricket Club won by 9 wickets
De Soysa Stadium, Moratuwa
Umpires: Chaturan Sanjeewa and Sanjeewa Fernando

- Nugegoda Sports and Welfare Club won the toss and elected to bat.
- The match was reduced to 26 overs per side due to rain.
- Hansa de Silva (Nugegoda Sports and Welfare Club) and Vibhavith Ehelepola (Kurunegala Youth Cricket Club) both made their List A debuts.

30 October 2021
Scorecard

Burgher Recreation Club	v	Sri Lanka Navy Sports Club

Match abandoned
Burgher Recreation Club Ground, Colombo
Umpires: Niroshana Amarasinghe and Ranjith Vishwakula

- No toss.

30 October 2021
Scorecard

Nondescripts Cricket Club; 139 (48.3 overs)	v	Sri Lanka Air Force Sports Club; 90/7 (28 overs)
Johanne de Silva 55* (125); Dulanjana Mendis 3/25 (10 overs)		Dilhan Cooray 16 (26); Chaturanga de Silva 3/30 (8 overs)

Nondescripts Cricket Club won by 20 runs (DLS method)
Air Force Ground, Katunayake
Umpires: Chaminda Hathurusingha and Asanga Jayasooriya

- Nondescripts Cricket Club won the toss and elected to bat.
- Sri Lanka Air Force Sports Club were set a revised target of 111 runs from 28 overs due to rain.

30 October 2021
Scorecard

Kalutara Town Club	v	Sri Lanka Army Sports Club

Match abandoned
Surrey Village Cricket Ground, Maggona
Umpires: Saman Mohan de Silva and Vidura Prasad

- No toss.

31 October 2021
Scorecard

Sri Lanka Navy Sports Club; 200 (49.5 overs)	v	Negombo Cricket Club; 185/7 (48 overs)
Buddika Madushan 45 (56); Pasindu Ushettige 3/41 (7 overs)		Angelo Jayasinghe 72 (124); Dilanka Auwardt 3/26 (10 overs)

Sri Lanka Navy Sports Club won by 2 runs (DLS method)
Navy Ground, Welisara
Umpires: R P Massalage and Ranmore Martinesz

- Negombo Cricket Club won the toss and elected to field.
- Negombo Cricket Club were set a revised target of 188 runs from 48 overs.

31 October 2021
Scorecard

Sri Lanka Air Force Sports Club; 167/9 (50 overs)	v	Kalutara Town Club; 95/7 (34.2 overs)
Dilhan Cooray 36 (84); Mahesh Priyadarshana 3/25 (10 overs)		Dineth Munasinghe 30* (53); Dulanjana Mendis 3/24 (9.2 overs)

Sri Lanka Air Force Sports Club won by 39 runs (DLS method)
Air Force Ground, Katunayake
Umpires: Ranganath Prasanna and Sisira Kumara

- Sri Lanka Air Force Sports Club won the toss and elected to bat.
- Kalutara Town Club were set a revised target of 135 runs from 34.2 overs due to rain.
- Ashan Sirisena and Ashen Mendis (Kalutara Town Club) both made their List A debuts.

31 October 2021
Scorecard

Kurunegala Youth Cricket Club	v	Colombo Cricket Club

Match abandoned
Welagedara Stadium, Kurunegala
Umpires: Kamal Indrajith and Shantha Fonseka

- No toss.

31 October 2021
Scorecard

Burgher Recreation Club; 153/9 (50 overs)	v	Sri Lanka Army Sports Club; 156/5 (27.3 overs)
Shasheen Fernando 35 (77); Asela Gunaratne 4/28 (10 overs)		Himasha Liyanage 44 (44); Malindu Shehan 2/30 (4 overs)

Sri Lanka Army Sports Club won by 5 wickets
Sri Lanka Army Ordnance Corps International Cricket Stadium, Horana
Umpires: Krishantha Rodrigo and Ravindra Kottahachchi

- Burgher Recreation Club won the toss and elected to bat.

31 October 2021
Scorecard

Kandy Customs Cricket Club; 139 (39.1 overs)	v	Moors Sports Club; 140/3 (30.1 overs)
Hasitha Nirmal 53 (74); Ayana Siriwardhana 3/20 (7.1 overs)		Pabasara Waduge 71 (73); AKT Rukshan 1/10 (3 overs)

Moors Sports Club won by 7 wickets
Moors Sports Club Ground, Colombo
Umpires: Hemantha Boteju and Prageeth Rambukwella

- Moors Sports Club won the toss and elected to field.
- AKT Rukshan, Vishwa Deemantha (Kandy Customs Cricket Club) and Sohan de Livera (Moors Sports Club) all made their List A debuts.

1 November 2021
Scorecard

Nondescripts Cricket Club	v	Lankan Cricket Club

Match abandoned
Nondescripts Cricket Club Ground, Colombo
Umpires: Lyndon Hannibal and Pradeep Udawatta

- No toss.

1 November 2021
Scorecard

Nugegoda Sports and Welfare Club	v	Moors Sports Club

Match abandoned
Moors Sports Club Ground, Colombo
Umpires: Damith Sanjeewa and Kapila Kottahachchi

- No toss.

3 November 2021
Scorecard

Kandy Customs Cricket Club; 113 (25.5 overs)	v	Lankan Cricket Club; 116/3 (19.4 overs)
Minhaj Jalill 28 (28); Kasun Madushanka 2/13 (4.5 overs)		Lahiru Dilshan 61* (62); Hasitha Nirmal 1/8 (2 overs)

Lankan Cricket Club won by 7 wickets
Thurstan College Ground, Colombo
Umpires: Hemantha Boteju and Saman Mohan de Silva

- Lankan Cricket Club won the toss and elected to field.
- Vinuda Liyanage (Lankan Cricket Club) made his List A debut.

3 November 2021
Scorecard

Kurunegala Youth Cricket Club; 161/9 (35 overs)	v	Sri Lanka Navy Sports Club; 97 (27.5 overs)
Dulaj Ranatunga 39 (40); Aravinda Akurugoda 4/33 (7 overs)		Madura Madushanka 41 (45); Dinushka Malan 2/5 (4 overs)

Kurunegala Youth Cricket Club won by 74 runs (DLS method)
Navy Ground, Welisara
Umpires: Ravindra Kottahachchi and Thilak Fernando

- Sri Lanka Navy Sports Club won the toss and elected to field.
- Sri Lanka Navy Sports Club were set a revised target of 172 runs from 35 overs due to rain.
- Nipuna Madusanka and Sahan Kosala (Sri Lanka Navy Sports Club) both made their List A debuts.

3 November 2021
Scorecard

Burgher Recreation Club; 186/9 (48 overs)	v	Sri Lanka Air Force Sports Club; 140 (38.3 overs)
Yuran Nimasha 38 (30); Movin Subasingha 3/32 (8 overs)		Udayawansha Parakrama 30 (36); Chameera Dissanayake 4/18 (8.3 overs)

Burgher Recreation Club won by 47 runs (DLS method)
Burgher Recreation Club Ground, Colombo
Umpires: R P Massalage and Vidura Prasad

- Burgher Recreation Club won the toss and elected to bat.
- Sri Lanka Air Force Sports Club were set a revised target of 188 runs from 48 overs due to rain.
- Yuran Nimasha (Burgher Recreation Club) made his List A debut.

3 November 2021
Scorecard

Sri Lanka Army Sports Club; 158/9 (39 overs)	v	Negombo Cricket Club; 167/3 (35.3 overs)
Asela Gunaratne 44 (45); Nishan Peiris 3/17 (8 overs)		Angelo Jayasinghe 43* (69); Thulina Dilshan 2/39 (8 overs)

Negombo Cricket Club won by 7 wickets (DLS method)
FTZ Sports Complex, Katunayake
Umpires: Kamal Indrajith and Suranga Perera

- Sri Lanka Army Sports Club won the toss and elected to bat.
- Negombo Cricket Club were set a revised target of 167 runs from 39 overs due to rain.

3 November 2021
Scorecard

Kalutara Town Club; 79 (28 overs)	v	Nondescripts Cricket Club; 83/4 (14 overs)
Asantha Basnayake 24 (70); Chaturanga de Silva 5/15 (7 overs)		Chaturanga de Silva 25* (15); Asanka Manoj 3/23 (4 overs)

Nondescripts Cricket Club won by 6 wickets (DLS method)
Nondescripts Cricket Club Ground, Colombo
Umpires: Chaminda Hathurusingha and Ranmore Martinesz

- Kalutara Town Club won the toss and elected to bat.
- Nondescripts Cricket Club were set a revised target of 78 runs from 40 overs due to rain.
- Ahan Wickramasinghe and Mayura Ranasinghe (Nondescripts Cricket Club) both made their List A debuts.

4 November 2021
Scorecard

Colombo Cricket Club	v	Moors Sports Club

Match abandoned
Colombo Cricket Club Ground, Colombo
Umpires: Kapila Kottahachchi and Ranjith Vishwakula

- No toss.

6 November 2021
Scorecard

Kalutara Town Club	v	Burgher Recreation Club

Match abandoned
Burgher Recreation Club Ground, Colombo
Umpires: Dammika Rajapakse and Hemantha Boteju

- No toss.

6 November 2021
Scorecard

Moors Sports Club; 85/1 (16.2 overs)	v	Sri Lanka Navy Sports Club
Pabasara Waduge 37* (43); Anuk Fernando 1/20 (4 overs)

No result
Navy Ground, Welisara
Umpires: Chamara De Zoysa and Chandrika Amarasinghe

- Sri Lanka Navy Sports Club won the toss and elected to field.

6 November 2021
Scorecard

Negombo Cricket Club; 137/8 (42 overs)	v	Sri Lanka Air Force Sports Club; 126 (38.5 overs)
Madawa Warnapura 35 (58); Dulanjana Mendis 2/19 (8 overs)		Sameen Kandanearachchi 23 (35); Upul Indrasiri 3/28 (9 overs)

Negombo Cricket Club won by 11 runs
Air Force Ground, Katunayake
Umpires: Lyndon Hannibal and Ranjith Vishwakula

- Negombo Cricket Club won the toss and elected to bat.

6 November 2021
Scorecard

Kurunegala Youth Cricket Club; 77 (27.4 overs)	v	Sri Lanka Army Sports Club; 78/3 (10.4 overs)
Sameera Sadamal 31 (58); Thulina Dilshan 2/7 (3 overs)		Asela Gunaratne 25* (21); Lahiru Jayaratne 3/32 (5.4 overs)

Sri Lanka Army Sports Club won by 7 wickets
Sri Lanka Army Ordnance Corps International Cricket Stadium, Horana
Umpires: Pradeep Udawatta and Saman Mohan de Silva

- Sri Lanka Army Sports Club won the toss and elected to field.
- Shehada Zoysa (Sri Lanka Army Sports Club) made his List A debut.

7 November 2021
Scorecard

Colombo Cricket Club	v	Lankan Cricket Club

Match abandoned
Colombo Cricket Club Ground, Colombo
Umpires: Eric Kannangara and Ranmore Martinesz

- No toss.

7 November 2021
Scorecard

Burgher Recreation Club	v	Nondescripts Cricket Club

Match abandoned
Burgher Recreation Club Ground, Colombo
Umpires: Gamini Dissanayake and Sanjeewa Fernando

- No toss.

7 November 2021
Scorecard

Moors Sports Club	v	Sri Lanka Army Sports Club

Match abandoned
Moors Sports Club Ground, Colombo
Umpires: Lyndon Hannibal and Upul Wewage

- No toss.

8 November 2021
Scorecard

Negombo Cricket Club	v	Kalutara Town Club

Match abandoned
FTZ Sports Complex, Katunayake
Umpires: Chandrika Amarasinghe and Upul Wewage

- No toss.

8 November 2021
Scorecard

Kurunegala Youth Cricket Club	v	Sri Lanka Air Force Sports Club

Match abandoned
Welagedara Stadium, Kurunegala
Umpires: Chaminda Hathurusingha and Prageeth Rambukwella

- No toss.

8 November 2021
Scorecard

Lankan Cricket Club	v	Nugegoda Sports and Welfare Club

Match abandoned
Surrey Village Cricket Ground, Maggona
Umpires: Krishantha Rodrigo and Rohitha Kottahachchi

- No toss.

8 November 2021
Scorecard

Nondescripts Cricket Club	v	Kandy Customs Cricket Club

Match abandoned
Nondescripts Cricket Club Ground, Colombo
Umpires: Nilantha Semasinghe and Sanjeewa Fernando

- No toss.

10 November 2021
Scorecard

Sri Lanka Air Force Sports Club	v	Moors Sports Club

Match abandoned
Air Force Ground, Katunayake
Umpires: Nilantha Semasinghe and Ranmore Martinesz

- No toss.

10 November 2021
Scorecard

Kalutara Town Club; 97 (36.1 overs)	v	Kurunegala Youth Cricket Club; 98/4 (23 overs)
Senal de Silva 26 (47); Dinushka Malan 4/16 (8 overs)		Sameera Sadamal 36 (54); Inshaka Siriwardena 2/14 (6 overs)

Kurunegala Youth Cricket Club won by 6 wickets
Surrey Village Cricket Ground, Maggona
Umpires: Chaturan Sanjeewa and Ranganath Prasanna

- Kurunegala Youth Cricket Club won the toss and elected to field.
- Asitha Wanninayake, Pawan Pathiraja (Kurunegala Youth Cricket Club) and Prabath Sachin (Kalutara Town Club) all made their List A debuts.

12 November 2021
Scorecard

Kurunegala Youth Cricket Club	v	Burgher Recreation Club

Match abandoned
Welagedara Stadium, Kurunegala
Umpires: Kamal Indrajith and Upul Wewage

- No toss.

13 November 2021
Scorecard

Lankan Cricket Club; 128 (44.5 overs)	v	Sri Lanka Army Sports Club; 130/3 (24.4 overs)
Lahiru Dilshan 32 (66); Seekkuge Prasanna 3/22 (9 overs)		Himasha Liyanage 55* (62); Kasun Madushanka 2/30 (5 overs)

Sri Lanka Army Sports Club won by 7 wickets
Sri Lanka Army Ordnance Corps International Cricket Stadium, Horana
Umpires: Rohitha Kottahachchi and Susantha Dissanayake

- Sri Lanka Army Sports Club won the toss and elected to field.

13 November 2021
Scorecard

Sri Lanka Navy Sports Club; 197 (50 overs)	v	Kandy Customs Cricket Club; 173 (48.3 overs)
Thushara Samarakoon 50 (83); Ravindra Karunaratne 4/30 (9 overs)		Chanaka Wijesinghe 58 (91); Pasindu Madushan 4/28 (9.3 overs)

Sri Lanka Navy Sports Club won by 24 runs
Navy Ground, Welisara
Umpires: Chaminda Hathurusingha and Nilan De Silva

- Sri Lanka Navy Sports Club won the toss and elected to bat.

13 November 2021
Scorecard

Nondescripts Cricket Club; 195 (43.1 overs)	v	Negombo Cricket Club; 195 (42.3 overs)
Hasitha Boyagoda 43 (56); Pasindu Ushettige 5/39 (9 overs)		Mohammad Mohsin 33 (32); Yugeesha Dishan 3/32 (9 overs)

Match tied
FTZ Sports Complex, Katunayake
Umpires: Matheesha Pathirana and Sanjeewa Fernando

- Negombo Cricket Club won the toss and elected to field.

14 November 2021
Scorecard

Burgher Recreation Club	v	Moors Sports Club

Match abandoned
Burgher Recreation Club Ground, Colombo
Umpires: Dammika Rajapakse and Nilan De Silva

- No toss.

14 November 2021
Scorecard

Kandy Customs Cricket Club	v	Sri Lanka Army Sports Club

Match abandoned
Moors Sports Club Ground, Colombo
Umpires: Damith Sanjeewa and R P Massalage

- No toss.

14 November 2021
Scorecard

Lankan Cricket Club	v	Sri Lanka Air Force Sports Club

Match abandoned
Air Force Ground, Katunayake
Umpires: Nilantha Semasinghe and Rohitha Kottahachchi

- No toss.

15 November 2021
Scorecard

Nugegoda Sports and Welfare Club	v	Sri Lanka Navy Sports Club

Match abandoned
De Soysa Stadium, Moratuwa
Umpires: Gamini Dissanayake and Ranjith Vishwakula

- No toss.

15 November 2021
Scorecard

Colombo Cricket Club	v	Nondescripts Cricket Club

Match abandoned
Colombo Cricket Club Ground, Colombo
Umpires: Pradeep Udawatta and Shantha Fonseka

- No toss.

17 November 2021
Scorecard

Nugegoda Sports and Welfare Club; 188/6 (50 overs)	v	Sri Lanka Army Sports Club; 109/4 (22.1 overs)
Nimesha Gunasinghe 69* (105); Shehada Zoysa 2/31 (10 overs)		Ashan Randika 49 (46); Navin Kavikara 3/19 (5.1 overs)

Sri Lanka Army Sports Club won by 16 runs (DLS method)
Sri Lanka Army Ordnance Corps International Cricket Stadium, Horana
Umpires: Deepal Gunawardene and R P Massalage

- Sri Lanka Army Sports Club won the toss and elected to field.
- Sri Lanka Army Sports Club were set a revised target of 94 runs from 22.1 overs due to rain.
- Sasika Dilshan (Sri Lanka Army Sports Club) made his List A debut.

17 November 2021
Scorecard

Kurunegala Youth Cricket Club	v	Nondescripts Cricket Club

Match abandoned
Welagedara Stadium, Kurunegala
Umpires: Gamini Dissanayake and Upul Wewage

- No toss.

17 November 2021
Scorecard

Sri Lanka Air Force Sports Club	v	Kandy Customs Cricket Club

Match abandoned
Air Force Ground, Katunayake
Umpires: Asanga Jayasooriya and CP Richards

- No toss.

17 November 2021
Scorecard

Colombo Cricket Club; 58/3 (9.1 overs)	v	Sri Lanka Navy Sports Club
Ashan Priyanjan 30 (29); Dhammika Prasad 1/10 (2 overs)

No result
Navy Ground, Welisara
Umpires: Eric Kannangara and Thilak Fernando

- Sri Lanka Navy Sports Club won the toss and elected to field.
- Ravin Tharindu (Sri Lanka Navy Sports Club) made his List A debut.

18 November 2021
Scorecard

Colombo Cricket Club	v	Nugegoda Sports and Welfare Club

Match abandoned
Colombo Cricket Club Ground, Colombo
Umpires: Deepal Gunawardene and Ravindra Kottahachchi

- No toss.

18 November 2021
Scorecard

Burgher Recreation Club	v	Negombo Cricket Club

Match abandoned
Burgher Recreation Club Ground, Colombo
Umpires: Hemantha Boteju and Kamal Indrajith

- No toss.

18 November 2021
Scorecard

Kandy Customs Cricket Club	v	Kalutara Town Club

Match abandoned
Panadura Esplanade, Panadura
Umpires: Asanga Jayasooriya and Dilshan de Silva

- No toss.

19 November 2021
Scorecard

Kandy Customs Cricket Club	v	Colombo Cricket Club

Match abandoned
Colombo Cricket Club Ground, Colombo
Umpires: Gamini Dissanayake and Krishantha Rodrigo

- No toss.

19 November 2021
Scorecard

Moors Sports Club; 160 (33.3 overs)	v	Kurunegala Youth Cricket Club; 70/7 (20.5 overs)
Dushan Vimukthi 45 (51); Sameera Sadamal 4/29 (7 overs)		Dinushka Malan 18* (33); Chanuka Dilshan 2/16 (5 overs)

Moors Sports Club won by 53 runs (DLS method)
FTZ Sports Complex, Katunayake
Umpires: Gamini Gunasekera and Thilak Fernando

- Kurunegala Youth Cricket Club won the toss and elected to field.
- Kurunegala Youth Cricket Club were set a revised target of 124 runs from 20.5 overs due to rain.

20 November 2021
Scorecard

Nondescripts Cricket Club; 256/8 (50 overs)	v	Sri Lanka Navy Sports Club; 88 (32.4 overs)
Sahan Arachchige 62 (44); Buddika Madushan 2/21 (6 overs)		Anuk Fernando 26 (57); Ashian Daniel 5/20 (6 overs)

Nondescripts Cricket Club won by 168 runs
Nondescripts Cricket Club Ground, Colombo
Umpires: Deepal Gunawardene and Namal Kumara

- Nondescripts Cricket Club won the toss and elected to bat.

20 November 2021
Scorecard

Nugegoda Sports and Welfare Club	v	Sri Lanka Air Force Sports Club

Match abandoned
De Soysa Stadium, Moratuwa
Umpires: Chandrika Amarasinghe and Nilan De Silva

- No toss.

20 November 2021
Scorecard

Burgher Recreation Club	v	Lankan Cricket Club

Match abandoned
Burgher Recreation Club Ground, Colombo
Umpires: Gamini Gunasekera and Vidura Prasad

- No toss.

20 November 2021
Scorecard

Colombo Cricket Club	v	Sri Lanka Army Sports Club

Match abandoned
Colombo Cricket Club Ground, Colombo
Umpires: Ravindra Kottahachchi and Shantha Fonseka

- No toss.

21 November 2021
Scorecard

Nondescripts Cricket Club	v	Moors Sports Club

Match abandoned
Nondescripts Cricket Club Ground, Colombo
Umpires: Kapila Kottahachchi and Susantha Dissanayake

- No toss.

21 November 2021
Scorecard

Kalutara Town Club; 88 (26.4 overs)	v	Nugegoda Sports and Welfare Club; 89/5 (18.5 overs)
Asantha Basnayake 18 (49); Raveen Sayer 2/11 (4.4 overs)		Nimesha Gunasinghe 28 (24); Inshaka Siriwardena 2/34 (9 overs)

Nugegoda Sports and Welfare Club won by 5 wickets
Surrey Village Cricket Ground, Maggona
Umpires: Ravindra Kottahachchi and Thilak Fernando

- Kalutara Town Club won the toss and elected to bat.

21 November 2021
Scorecard

Burgher Recreation Club; 101 (30.4 overs)	v	Kandy Customs Cricket Club; 103/9 (36.1 overs)
Dan Mousley 21 (25); Ravindra Karunaratne 3/19 (6 overs)		Minhaj Jalill 21 (42); Dushan Hemantha 6/28 (10 overs)

Kandy Customs Cricket Club won by 1 wicket
Burgher Recreation Club Ground, Colombo
Umpires: Chaturan Sanjeewa and Pradeep Udawatta

- Burgher Recreation Club won the toss and elected to bat.
- Moditha Ranatunga (Burgher Recreation Club) and Sajitha De Silva (Kandy Customs Cricket Club) both made their List A debuts.

21 November 2021
Scorecard

Colombo Cricket Club; 187 (50 overs)	v	Sri Lanka Air Force Sports Club; 146 (46.1 overs)
Lasith Abeyratne 47 (66); Aravinda Premaratne 5/38 (10 overs)		Kemira Wijenayake 50 (116); Sonal Dinusha 3/17 (8 overs)

Colombo Cricket Club won by 41 runs
Air Force Ground, Katunayake
Umpires: Gamini Dissanayake and Nilan De Silva

- Colombo Cricket Club won the toss and elected to bat.
- Chalana Sankalpa, Yasaruwan Herath (Colombo Cricket Club) and Madushanka Premaratne (Sri Lanka Air Force Sports Club) all made their List A debuts.

21 November 2021
Scorecard

Sri Lanka Navy Sports Club; 139 (39.5 overs)	v	Sri Lanka Army Sports Club; 140/3 (31 overs)
Madura Madushanka 23 (38); Shehada Zoysa 5/37 (10 overs)		Asela Gunaratne 59* (72); Pasindu Madushan 2/28 (10 overs)

Sri Lanka Army Sports Club won by 7 wickets
Sri Lanka Army Ordnance Corps International Cricket Stadium, Horana
Umpires: Saman Mohan de Silva and Vidura Prasad

- Sri Lanka Navy Sports Club won the toss and elected to bat.
- Suhanga Wijewardana (Sri Lanka Navy Sports Club) made his List A debut.

21 November 2021
Scorecard

Lankan Cricket Club	v	Negombo Cricket Club

Match abandoned
Army Ground, Panagoda
Umpires: Asanga Jayasooriya and Dammika Rajapakse

- No toss.

22 November 2021
Scorecard

Lankan Cricket Club; 216 (44.5 overs)	v	Kalutara Town Club; 122 (35.2 overs)
Lahiru Dilshan 73 (83); Mahesh Priyadarshana 5/42 (8.5 overs)		Romesh Nallaperuma 32 (43); Rajeewa Weerasinghe 3/14 (3.2 overs)

Lankan Cricket Club won by 94 runs
Army Ground, Panagoda
Umpires: Chaturan Sanjeewa and Ranjith Vishwakula

- Kalutara Town Club won the toss and elected to field.
- Thevindu Senaratne and Yasitha Umayanga (Kalutara Town Club) both made their List A debuts.

22 November 2021
Scorecard

Kandy Customs Cricket Club; 175 (48.2 overs)	v	Nugegoda Sports and Welfare Club; 74 (30.2 overs)
Rashmika Madushanka 28 (60); Sahan Nanayakkara 2/19 (10 overs)		Pathum Madusanka 20 (89); Umega Chaturanga 4/12 (7.2 overs)

Kandy Customs Cricket Club won by 101 runs
De Soysa Stadium, Moratuwa
Umpires: Kapila Kottahachchi and Saman Mohan de Silva

- Nugegoda Sports and Welfare Club won the toss and elected to field.
- Rashmika Madushanka (Nugegoda Sports and Welfare Club) made his List A debut.

23 November 2021
Scorecard

Nondescripts Cricket Club; 142 (42.1 overs)	v	Nugegoda Sports and Welfare Club; 63/7 (24 overs)
Ashian Daniel 22* (52); Ranitha Liyanarachchi 3/14 (7 overs)		Raveen Sayer 27 (40); Yugeesha Dishan 2/14 (7 overs)

Nondescripts Cricket Club won by 50 runs (DLS method)
Nondescripts Cricket Club Ground, Colombo
Umpires: Asanga Jayasooriya and Thilak Fernando

- Nondescripts Cricket Club won the toss and elected to bat.
- Nugegoda Sports and Welfare Club were set a revised target of 114 runs from 24 overs due to rain.

23 November 2021
Scorecard

Sri Lanka Navy Sports Club; 195 (48.5 overs)	v	Lankan Cricket Club; 197/7 (40.2 overs)
Madura Madushanka 53 (91); Geeth Kumara 3/16 (4.5 overs)		Risith Upamal 53* (70); Madura Madushanka 2/33 (7 overs)

Lankan Cricket Club won by 3 wickets
Navy Ground, Welisara
Umpires: Gamini Dissanayake and Namal Kumara

- Lankan Cricket Club won the toss and elected to field.

23 November 2021
Scorecard

Kalutara Town Club; 161 (44.3 overs)	v	Moors Sports Club; 151/2 (25.5 overs)
Senal de Silva 76* (81); Chanuka Dilshan 4/27 (10 overs)		Kavindu Kulasekara 64* (63); Themal Bandara 2/35 (9 overs)

Moors Sports Club won by 8 wickets (DLS method)
Sri Lanka Army Ordnance Corps International Cricket Stadium, Horana
Umpires: Ranjith Vishwakula and Vidura Prasad

- Moors Sports Club won the toss and elected to field.
- Moors Sports Club were set a revised target of 148 runs from 25.5 overs due to rain.
- Themal Bandara (Kalutara Town Club) made his List A debut.

23 November 2021
Scorecard

Negombo Cricket Club; 235 (49.5 overs)	v	Kandy Customs Cricket Club; 154 (41.1 overs)
Dilshan Munaweera 59 (65); Methushan Thilina 2/34 (10 overs)		Chanaka Wijesinghe 75 (90); Upul Indrasiri 3/16 (9 overs)

Negombo Cricket Club won by 81 runs
FTZ Sports Complex, Katunayake
Umpires: Dilshan de Silva and Nilan De Silva

- Negombo Cricket Club won the toss and elected to bat.
- Jeewaka Shashen (Negombo Cricket Club) made his List A debut.

24 November 2021
Scorecard

Nondescripts Cricket Club	v	Sri Lanka Army Sports Club

Match abandoned
Nondescripts Cricket Club Ground, Colombo
Umpires: Kapila Kottahachchi and Shantha Fonseka

- No toss.

24 November 2021
Scorecard

Kalutara Town Club	v	Colombo Cricket Club

Match abandoned
Colombo Cricket Club Ground, Colombo
Umpires: Keerthi Bandara and Thilak Fernando

- No toss.

24 November 2021
Scorecard

Sri Lanka Navy Sports Club; 111 (38.1 overs)	v	Sri Lanka Air Force Sports Club; 112/8 (29.1 overs)
Madura Madushanka 35 (64); Gayan Sirisoma 4/15 (9 overs)		Udayawansha Parakrama 21 (30); Aravinda Akurugoda 3/28 (7.1 overs)

Sri Lanka Air Force Sports Club won by 2 wickets
Navy Ground, Welisara
Umpires: Gamini Gunasekera and Ravindra Kottahachchi

- Sri Lanka Navy Sports Club won the toss and elected to bat.
- Dulanjana Wijesinghe (Sri Lanka Air Force Sports Club) made his List A debut.

24 November 2021
Scorecard

Burgher Recreation Club; 232 (33.5 overs)	v	Nugegoda Sports and Welfare Club; 98 (23.3 overs)
Dan Mousley 105 (94); Rahul Gunasekera 3/35 (4.5 overs)		Raveen Sayer 23 (23); Dushan Hemantha 4/34 (7 overs)

Burgher Recreation Club won by 134 runs
Burgher Recreation Club Ground, Colombo
Umpires: Dilshan de Silva and Sanjeewa Fernando

- Nugegoda Sports and Welfare Club won the toss and elected to field.
- Janith Dias (Nugegoda Sports and Welfare Club), Pubudu Bandara and Yeshith Rupasinghe (Burgher Recreation Club) all made their List A debuts.

24 November 2021
Scorecard

Lankan Cricket Club	v	Kurunegala Youth Cricket Club

Match abandoned
Army Ground, Panagoda
Umpires: Upul Wewage and Vidura Prasad

- No toss.

24 November 2021
Scorecard

Negombo Cricket Club; 100/8 (28 overs)	v	Moors Sports Club; 67/4 (15.4 overs)
Angelo Jayasinghe 47* (71); Chanuka Dilshan 2/16 (6 overs)		Salinda Ushan 20 (25); Upul Indrasiri 2/16 (3.4 overs)

No result
Sri Lanka Army Ordnance Corps International Cricket Stadium, Horana
Umpires: Asanga Jayasooriya and Ranganath Prasanna

- Moors Sports Club won the toss and elected to field.
- Lohan de Zoysa (Moors Sports Club) made his List A debut.

=== Group B ===
27 October 2021
Scorecard

Bloomfield Cricket and Athletic Club	v	Panadura Sports Club

Match abandoned
Bloomfield Cricket and Athletic Club Ground, Colombo
Umpires: Chamara de Soysa and Suranga Perera

- No toss.

27 October 2021
Scorecard

Ace Capital Cricket Club; 243/9 (50 overs)	v	Badureliya Sports Club; 120 (29.1 overs)
Umesh Karunaratne 81* (99); Buddika Sanjeewa 3/71 (10 overs)		Jeevan Mendis 32 (36); Chanaka Komasaru 6/14 (10 overs)

Ace Capital Cricket Club won by 123 runs
Surrey Village Cricket Ground, Maggona
Umpires: Ravindra Kottahachchi and Saman Mohan de Silva

- Badureliya Sports Club won the toss and elected to field.
- Arjun Shetty, Ranesh Silva, Saly Samson (Badureliya Sports Club) and Janak Prakash (Ace Capital Cricket Club) all made their List A debuts.

27 October 2021
Scorecard

Colts Cricket Club; 226/6 (50 overs)	v	Galle Cricket Club; 189/7 (47 overs)
Angelo Mathews 45 (60); Rajith Priyan 2/40 (9 overs)		Dulash Udayanga 36* (57); Kavishka Anjula 4/37 (10 overs)

Colts Cricket Club won by 17 runs (DLS method)
Colts Cricket Club Ground, Colombo
Umpires: Chaminda Hathurusingha and Palitha de Alwis

- Galle Cricket Club won the toss and elected to field.
- Galle Cricket Club were set a revised target of 207 runs from 47 overs due to rain.
- Dineth Samaraweera (Colts Cricket Club) made his List A debut.

27 October 2021
Scorecard

Sebastianites Cricket and Athletic Club; 186 (42.5 overs)	v	Tamil Union Cricket and Athletic Club; 149/4 (37 overs)
Adeesha Nanayakkara 55 (81); Jeffrey Vandersay 3/43 (9 overs)		Kamesh Nirmal 57 (84); Tharindu Ratnayake 2/26 (8 overs)

Tamil Union Cricket and Athletic Club won by 2 runs (DLS method)
P Sara Oval, Colombo
Umpires: Krishantha Rodrigo and Ranmore Martinesz

- Tamil Union Cricket and Athletic Club won the toss and elected to field.
- Tamil Union Cricket and Athletic Club were set a revised target of 148 runs from 37 overs due to rain.
- Navod Paranavithana (Tamil Union Cricket and Athletic Club) made his List A debut.

27 October 2021
Scorecard

Chilaw Marians Cricket Club; 289/8 (50 overs)	v	Saracens Sports Club; 140 (43.1 overs)
Rumesh Buddika 54 (63); Praveen Sandamal 2/28 (7 overs)		Nipun Karunanayake 28 (53); Dasun Senevirathna 2/13 (6 overs)

Chilaw Marians Cricket Club won by 149 runs
FTZ Sports Complex, Katunayake
Umpires: Kamal Indrajith and Thilak Fernando

- Saracens Sports Club won the toss and elected to field.
- Ameer Zeeshan, Jay Pandey, Sheshan Silva (Chilaw Marians Cricket Club), Kavindu Dilhara, Kavindu Nirmana, Praveen Sandamal and Rasindu Ishan (Saracens Sports Club) all made their List A debuts.

27 October 2021
Scorecard

Sinhalese Sports Club; 190/7 (36 overs)	v	Police Sports Club; 137/4 (25.1 overs)
Krishan Sanjula 76 (89); Nalin Priyadarshana 2/27 (7 overs)		Maduranga Zoysa 55 (65); Saranga Rajaguru 1/14 (4 overs)

Police Sports Club won by 15 runs (DLS method)
Nondescripts Cricket Club Ground, Colombo
Umpires: Eric Kannangara and Niroshana Amarasinghe

- Sinhalese Sports Club won the toss and elected to bat.
- Police Sports Club were set a revised target of 123 runs from 25.1 overs due to rain.
- Kavindu Nadeeshan (Sinhalese Sports Club) made his List A debut.

28 October 2021
Scorecard

Badureliya Sports Club; 49/1 (8 overs)	v	Police Sports Club
Arjun Shetty 24* (23); Nalin Priyadarshana 1/17 (2 overs)

No result
Police Park Ground, Colombo
Umpires: Nilan De Silva and Suranga Perera

- Badureliya Sports Club won the toss and elected to bat.
- Malinda Jayod (Badureliya Sports Club) made his List A debut.

30 October 2021
Scorecard

Sinhalese Sports Club; 84 (26 overs)	v	Galle Cricket Club; 42/3 (13 overs)
Saranga Rajaguru 29 (41); Chalana de Silva 3/10 (6 overs)		Raveen Yasas 18 (33); Prabath Jayasuriya 2/14 (5 overs)

No result
Galle International Stadium, Galle
Umpires: Thilak Fernando and Ranganath Prasanna

- Galle Cricket Club won the toss and elected to field.
- The match was reduced to 32 overs per side due to wet outfield.
- Avishka Senadeera (Sinhalese Sports Club) made his List A debut.

30 October 2021
Scorecard

Ragama Cricket Club; 113 (30.5 overs)	v	Ace Capital Cricket Club; 19/2 (6 overs)
Manisha Rupasinghe 21 (34); Chanaka Komasaru 3/12 (6 overs)		Irosh Samarasooriya 8 (13); Nipun Malinga 2/12 (3 overs)

No result
Sri Lanka Army Ordnance Corps International Cricket Stadium, Horana
Umpires: Palitha de Alwis and Ravindra Kottahachchi

- Ace Capital Cricket Club won the toss and elected to field.
- Avishka Tharindu (Ragama Cricket Club) made his List A debut.

30 October 2021
Scorecard

Bloomfield Cricket and Athletic Club; 190/9 (44 overs)	v	Chilaw Marians Cricket Club; 57/1 (8 overs)
Harsha Vithana 60 (69); Avindu Theekshana 3/30 (9 overs)		Vishva Chathuranga 30* (24); Kavindu Ridmal 1/19 (2 overs)

No result
FTZ Sports Complex, Katunayake
Umpires: Ranmore Martinesz and Nilantha Semasinghe

- Bloomfield Cricket and Athletic Club won the toss and elected to bat.

30 October 2021
Scorecard

Saracens Sports Club	v	Colts Cricket Club

Match abandoned
De Soysa Stadium, Moratuwa
Umpires: Eric Kannangara and Kapila Kottahachchi

- No toss.

30 October 2021
Scorecard

Panadura Sports Club	v	Tamil Union Cricket and Athletic Club

Panadura Esplanade, Panadura
Umpires: Susantha Dissanayake and Upul Wewage

31 October 2021
Scorecard

Ragama Cricket Club	v	Sebastianites Cricket and Athletic Club

Match abandoned
Thurstan College Ground, Colombo
Umpires: Chaminda Hathurusingha and Vidura Prasad

- No toss.

31 October 2021
Scorecard

Ace Capital Cricket Club	v	Police Sports Club

Match abandoned
P Sara Oval, Colombo
Umpires: Nilantha Semasinghe and Rohitha Kottahachchi

- No toss.

31 October 2021
Scorecard

Bloomfield Cricket and Athletic Club	v	Colts Cricket Club

Match abandoned
Bloomfield Cricket and Athletic Club Ground, Colombo
Umpires: Asanga Jayasooriya and Chaturan Sanjeewa

- No toss.

31 October 2021
Scorecard

Badureliya Sports Club; 213/8 (50 overs)	v	Galle Cricket Club; 199 (49.1 overs)
Jeevan Mendis 38 (57); Chalana de Silva 3/29 (9 overs)		Chanaka Ruwansiri 75 (91); Jeevan Mendis 5/45 (9 overs)

Badureliya Sports Club won by 14 runs
Surrey Village Cricket Ground, Maggona
Umpires: Saman Mohan de Silva and Sanjeewa Fernando

- Galle Cricket Club won the toss and elected to field.

31 October 2021
Scorecard

Tamil Union Cricket and Athletic Club; 251/9 (50 overs)	v	Chilaw Marians Cricket Club; 140/6 (36.2 overs)
Navod Paranavithana 79 (96); Avindu Theekshana 3/45 (10 overs)		Vishva Chathuranga 46 (59); Pramod Madushan 2/17 (4.2 overs)

Tamil Union Cricket and Athletic Club won by 45 runs (DLS method)
FTZ Sports Complex, Katunayake
Umpires: Nilan De Silva and Niroshana Amarasinghe

- Tamil Union Cricket and Athletic Club won the toss and elected to bat.
- Chilaw Marians Cricket Club were set a revised target of 186 runs from 36.2 overs.

1 November 2021
Scorecard

Sinhalese Sports Club	v	Saracens Sports Club

Match abandoned
Sinhalese Sports Club Ground, Colombo
Umpires: Gamini Dissanayake and Susantha Dissanayake

- No toss.

3 November 2021
Scorecard

Tamil Union Cricket and Athletic Club; 200 (44.3 overs)	v	Colts Cricket Club; 160/9 (41 overs)
Kamesh Nirmal 43 (66); Muditha Lakshan 4/37 (9.3 overs)		Priyamal Perera 38 (65); Pramod Madushan 5/48 (10 overs)

Tamil Union Cricket and Athletic Club won by 32 runs (DLS method)
Colts Cricket Club Ground, Colombo
Umpires: Gamini Dissanayake and Shantha Fonseka

- Colts Cricket Club won the toss and elected to field.
- Colts Cricket Club were set a revised target of 193 runs from 41 overs due to rain.
- Dilum Sudeera (Tamil Union Cricket and Athletic Club) made his List A debut.

3 November 2021
Scorecard

Bloomfield Cricket and Athletic Club; 200/8 (36 overs)	v	Sinhalese Sports Club; 138/3 (28 overs)
Charitha Kumarasinghe 62 (74); Kavindu Nadeeshan 3/38 (7 overs)		Krishan Sanjula 56* (82); Mishen Silva 1/20 (3.2 overs)

Bloomfield Cricket and Athletic Club won by 1 run (DLS method)
Sinhalese Sports Club Ground, Colombo
Umpires: Lyndon Hannibal and Upul Wewage

- Sinhalese Sports Club won the toss and elected to field.
- Sinhalese Sports Club were set a revised target of 140 runs from 28 overs due to rain.
- Omesh Mendis (Sinhalese Sports Club) made his List A debut.

3 November 2021
Scorecard

Galle Cricket Club	v	Ace Capital Cricket Club

Match abandoned
Galle International Stadium, Galle
Umpires: Eric Kannangara and Rohitha Kottahachchi

- No toss.

3 November 2021
Scorecard

Saracens Sports Club; 145 (49.1 overs)	v	Badureliya Sports Club; 148/7 (37.4 overs)
Promod Maduwantha 43 (105); Alankara Asanka Silva 3/23 (10 overs)		Sandun Weerakkody 51 (48); Promod Maduwantha 3/25 (10 overs)

Badureliya Sports Club won by 3 wickets
Surrey Village Cricket Ground, Maggona
Umpires: Asanga Jayasooriya and Damith Sanjeewa

- Badureliya Sports Club won the toss and elected to field.
- Rasanjana Silva (Badureliya Sports Club) made his List A debut.

3 November 2021
Scorecard

Police Sports Club; 193 (49.5 overs)	v	Ragama Cricket Club; 194/5 (44.5 overs)
Asel Sigera 42 (78); Kalhara Senarathne 3/41 (10 overs)		Ishan Jayaratne 49* (37); Nalin Priyadarshana 2/44 (9.5 overs)

Ragama Cricket Club won by 5 wickets
Police Park Ground, Colombo
Umpires: Palitha de Alwis and Prageeth Rambukwella

- Ragama Cricket Club won the toss and elected to field.
- Hareen Rathnamudali (Ragama Cricket Club) made his List A debut.

4 November 2021
Scorecard

Sebastianites Cricket and Athletic Club; 228 (49.2 overs)	v	Panadura Sports Club; 174 (42.5 overs)
Sachitha Jayathilake 71 (96); Iwanka Sanjula 2/31 (6 overs)		Dunith Jayatunga 49 (74); Chamikara Edirisinghe 4/34 (9.5 overs)

Sebastianites Cricket and Athletic Club won by 54 runs
Panadura Esplanade, Panadura
Umpires: Chaturan Sanjeewa and Pradeep Udawatta

- Panadura Sports Club won the toss and elected to field.

5 November 2021
Scorecard

Sebastianites Cricket and Athletic Club	v	Chilaw Marians Cricket Club

Match abandoned
FTZ Sports Complex, Katunayake
Umpires: Gamini Dissanayake and Ranmore Martinesz

- No toss.

6 November 2021
Scorecard

Badureliya Sports Club; 164 (31.5 overs)	v	Bloomfield Cricket and Athletic Club
Arjun Shetty 40 (55); Maduka Liyanapathiranage 2/13 (6 overs)

No result
Surrey Village Cricket Ground, Maggona
Umpires: Thilak Fernando and Vidura Prasad

- Badureliya Sports Club won the toss and elected to bat.
- Mithira Thenura (Badureliya Sports Club) made his List A debut.

6 November 2021
Scorecard

Police Sports Club; 141/8 (25 overs)	v	Galle Cricket Club; 118/2 (18.2 overs)
Tillakaratne Sampath 42 (44); Chathura Lakshan 3/25 (5 overs)		Chanaka Ruwansiri 48* (39); Nalin Priyadarshana 1/18 (3 overs)

No result
Police Park Ground, Colombo
Umpires: Ranganath Prasanna and Sisira Kumara

- Galle Cricket Club won the toss and elected field.
- Dimuth Sandaruwan (Galle Cricket Club) made his List A debut.

6 November 2021
Scorecard

Tamil Union Cricket and Athletic Club	v	Sinhalese Sports Club

Match abandoned
P Sara Oval, Colombo
Umpires: Damith Sanjeewa and Prageeth Rambukwella

- No toss.

7 November 2021
Scorecard

Chilaw Marians Cricket Club	v	Panadura Sports Club

Match abandoned
FTZ Sports Complex, Katunayake
Umpires: Chaminda Hathurusingha and Hemantha Boteju

- No toss.

7 November 2021
Scorecard

Saracens Sports Club; 67/2 (23.2 overs)	v	Police Sports Club
Nipun Karunanayake 29* (62); Nalin Priyadarshana 1/9 (5.2 overs)

No result
Police Park Ground, Colombo
Umpires: Chamara De Zoysa and Chaturan Sanjeewa

- Police Sports Club won the toss and elected to field.

7 November 2021
Scorecard

Galle Cricket Club	v	Ragama Cricket Club

Match abandoned
Galle International Stadium, Galle
Umpires: Damith Sanjeewa and Vidura Prasad

- No toss

7 November 2021
Scorecard

Tamil Union Cricket and Athletic Club	v	Badureliya Sports Club

Match abandoned
P Sara Oval, Colombo
Umpires: R P Massalage and Sisira Kumara

- No toss

9 November 2021
Scorecard

Ragama Cricket Club	v	Panadura Sports Club

Match abandoned
Thurstan College Ground, Colombo
Umpires: Eric Kannangara and Susantha Dissanayake

- No toss.

10 November 2021
Scorecard

Ace Capital Cricket Club	v	Tamil Union Cricket and Athletic Club

Match abandoned
Sri Lanka Army Ordnance Corps International Cricket Stadium, Horana
Umpires: Chamara De Zoysa and Krishantha Rodrigo

- No toss.

10 November 2021
Scorecard

Panadura Sports Club	v	Colts Cricket Club

Match abandoned
Panadura Esplanade, Panadura
Umpires: Kapila Kottahachchi and Saman Mohan de Silva

- No toss.

10 November 2021
Scorecard

Bloomfield Cricket and Athletic Club; 136 (31.5 overs)	v	Police Sports Club; 137/6 (28.5 overs)
Yohan de Silva 30 (40); Supun Madushanka 3/25 (6 overs)		Denuwan Rajakaruna 29 (47); Maduka Liyanapathiranage 3/35 (7 overs)

Police Sports Club won by 4 wickets
Police Park Ground, Colombo
Umpires: Lyndon Hannibal and R P Massalage

- Police Sports Club won the toss and elected to field.

11 November 2021
Scorecard

Saracens Sports Club; 153/9 (30 overs)	v	Galle Cricket Club; 118/9 (25 overs)
Nipun Karunanayake 37 (45); Chalana de Silva 5/36 (6 overs)		Chalana de Silva 38 (27); Mohomed Dilshad 3/7 (5 overs)

Saracens Sports Club won by 25 runs (DLS method)
De Soysa Stadium, Moratuwa
Umpires: Palitha de Alwis and Ravindra Kottahachchi

- Galle Cricket Club won the toss and elected to field.
- Galle Cricket Club were set a revised target of 144 runs from 25 overs due to rain.
- Prabath de Zoysa (Galle Cricket Club) made his List A debut.

12 November 2021
Scorecard

Sinhalese Sports Club	v	Panadura Sports Club

Match abandoned
Sinhalese Sports Club Ground, Colombo
Umpires: Palitha de Alwis and Ranganath Prasanna

- No toss.

12 November 2021
Scorecard

Badureliya Sports Club	v	Sebastianites Cricket and Athletic Club

Match abandoned
Surrey Village Cricket Ground, Maggona
Umpires: Kapila Kottahachchi and R P Massalage

- No toss.

13 November 2021
Scorecard

Saracens Sports Club; 162 (42 overs)	v	Ragama Cricket Club; 163/9 (42 overs)
Promod Maduwantha 46 (84); Janith Liyanage 3/27 (9 overs)		Saminda Fernando 27 (41); Promod Maduwantha 2/18 (6 overs)

Ragama Cricket Club won by 1 wicket
Surrey Village Cricket Ground, Maggona
Umpires: Eric Kannangara and Hemantha Boteju

- Saracens Sports Club won the toss and elected to bat.
- Gihan Ebert (Saracens Sports Club) made his List A debut.

14 November 2021
Scorecard

Galle Cricket Club; 153/9 (31 overs)	v	Tamil Union Cricket and Athletic Club; 163/7 (30 overs)
Chanaka Ruwansiri 39 (22); Dilum Sudeera 4/17 (6 overs)		Santhush Gunathilake 79* (71); Chalana de Silva 2/25 (7 overs)

Tamil Union Cricket and Athletic Club
Surrey Village Cricket Ground, Maggona
Umpires: Sanjeewa Fernando and Susantha Dissanayake

- Galle Cricket Club won the toss and elected to bat.
- Raveen de Silva (Tamil Union Cricket and Athletic Club) and Sudheera Weeraratne (Galle Cricket Club) both made their List A debuts.

14 November 2021
Scorecard

Ragama Cricket Club	v	Colts Cricket Club

Match abandoned
Thurstan College Ground, Colombo
Umpires: Ravindra Kottahachchi and Saman Mohan de Silva

- No toss.

14 November 2021
Scorecard

Chilaw Marians Cricket Club	v	Sinhalese Sports Club

Match abandoned
FTZ Sports Complex, Katunayake
Umpires: Chaminda Hathurusingha and Hemantha Boteju

- No toss.

14 November 2021
Scorecard

Sebastianites Cricket and Athletic Club	v	Ace Capital Cricket Club

Match abandoned
De Soysa Stadium, Moratuwa
Umpires: Chamara De Zoysa and Thilak Fernando

- No toss.

15 November 2021
Scorecard

Bloomfield Cricket and Athletic Club	v	Saracens Sports Club

Match abandoned
Bloomfield Cricket and Athletic Club Ground, Colombo
Umpires: Chandrika Amarasinghe and Kapila Kottahachchi

- No toss.

16 November 2021
Scorecard

Colts Cricket Club	v	Chilaw Marians Cricket Club

Match abandoned
Colts Cricket Club Ground, Colombo
Umpires: Damith Sanjeewa and Gamini Dissanayake

- No toss.

16 November 2021
Scorecard

Badureliya Sports Club; 85 (28 overs)	v	Panadura Sports Club; 86/4 (12.5 overs)
Alankara Asanka Silva 20 (46); Nimesh Vimukthi 6/17 (9 overs)		Abhishek Gupta 21* (17); Buddika Sanjeewa 2/24 (4 overs)

Panadura Sports Club won by 6 wickets
Surrey Village Cricket Ground, Maggona
Umpires: Ravindra Kottahachchi and Saman Mohan de Silva

- Badureliya Sports Club won the toss and elected to bat.

17 November 2021
Scorecard

Chilaw Marians Cricket Club; 175 (44.2 overs)	v	Badureliya Sports Club; 95 (34.2 overs)
Vishva Chathuranga 44 (57); Ruchira Koshitha 3/31 (9 overs)		Jeevan Mendis 34 (56); Kamindu Mendis 3/26 (10 overs)

Chilaw Marians Cricket Club won by 80 runs
Surrey Village Cricket Ground, Maggona
Umpires: Rohitha Kottahachchi and Saman Mohan de Silva

- Badureliya Sports Club won the toss and elected to field.

17 November 2021
Scorecard

Bloomfield Cricket and Athletic Club	v	Ragama Cricket Club

Match abandoned
Bloomfield Cricket and Athletic Club Ground, Colombo
Umpires: Palitha de Alwis and Pradeep Udawatta

- No toss.

17 November 2021
Scorecard

Sinhalese Sports Club	v	Colts Cricket Club

Match abandoned
Colts Cricket Club Ground, Colombo
Umpires: Chandrika Amarasinghe and Kapila Kottahachchi

- No toss.

17 November 2021
Scorecard

Sebastianites Cricket and Athletic Club; 179/8 (36 overs)	v	Police Sports Club; 147/7 (30 overs)
Sacha De Alwis 66 (75); Nisala Tharaka 3/23 (5 overs)		Maduranga Zoysa 41 (50); Madushan Ravichandrakumar 2/20 (3 overs)

Sebastianites Cricket and Athletic Club won by 2 runs (DLS method)
De Soysa Stadium, Moratuwa
Umpires: Damith Sanjeewa and Vidura Prasad

- Police Sports Club won the toss and elected to field.
- Police Sports Club were set a revised target of 150 runs from 30 overs due to rain.

18 November 2021
Scorecard

Bloomfield Cricket and Athletic Club; 148 (42 overs)	v	Galle Cricket Club; 122/9 (36.2 overs)
Harsha Vithana 37 (52); Rajith Priyan 4/28 (8 overs)		Chanaka Ruwansiri 39 (53); Dileepa Jayalath 4/24 (9 overs)

Bloomfield Cricket and Athletic Club won by 18 runs (DLS method)
Sri Lanka Army Ordnance Corps International Cricket Stadium, Horana
Umpires: Dammika Rajapakse and Pradeep Udawatta

- Bloomfield Cricket and Athletic Club won the toss and elected to bat.
- Galle Cricket Club were set a revised target of 141 runs from 36.2 overs due to rain.

18 November 2021
Scorecard

Ragama Cricket Club; 188/6 (28 overs)	v	Chilaw Marians Cricket Club; 130 (20.5 overs)
Nishan Madushka 78 (80); Thikshila de Silva 2/33 (6 overs)		Kamindu Mendis 41 (46); Janaka Sampath 5/23 (5.5 overs)

Ragama Cricket Club won by 58 runs
FTZ Sports Complex, Katunayake
Umpires: Ranjith Vishwakula and Rohitha Kottahachchi

- Ragama Cricket Club won the toss and elected to bat.

18 November 2021
Scorecard

Sebastianites Cricket and Athletic Club	v	Sinhalese Sports Club

Match abandoned
De Soysa Stadium, Moratuwa
Umpires: Shantha Fonseka and Sisira Kumara

- No toss.

19 November 2021
Scorecard

Sebastianites Cricket and Athletic Club	v	Sinhalese Sports Club

Match abandoned
De Soysa Stadium, Moratuwa
Umpires: Shantha Fonseka and Sisira Kumara

- No toss.

19 November 2021
Scorecard

Ace Capital Cricket Club	v	Saracens Sports Club

No result
Sri Lanka Army Ordnance Corps International Cricket Stadium, Horana
Umpires: Ravindra Kottahachchi and Vidura Prasad

- Ace Capital Cricket Club won the toss
- No play was possible due to rain.

20 November 2021
Scorecard

Colts Cricket Club; 167 (48.2 overs)	v	Badureliya Sports Club; 111 (42.1 overs)
Vishad Randika 24 (50); Jeevan Mendis 3/40 (10 overs)		Mithira Thenura 22 (43); Akila Dananjaya 4/21 (10 overs)

Colts Cricket Club won by 56 runs
Surrey Village Cricket Ground, Maggona
Umpires: Chaturan Sanjeewa and Keerthi Bandara

- Badureliya Sports Club won the toss and elected to field.
- Shehan Dilshan (Badureliya Sports Club) made his List A debut.

20 November 2021
Scorecard

Ragama Cricket Club	v	Sinhalese Sports Club

Match abandoned
Thurstan College Ground, Colombo
Umpires: Rohitha Kottahachchi and Susantha Dissanayake

- No toss.

20 November 2021
Scorecard

Chilaw Marians Cricket Club; 169 (37.4 overs)	v	Ace Capital Cricket Club; 104 (32 overs)
Pulina Tharanga 55 (56); Chanaka Komasaru 4/20 (10 overs)		Janak Prakash 24 (24); Thikshila de Silva 3/24 (8 overs)

Chilaw Marians Cricket Club won by 65 runs
FTZ Sports Complex, Katunayake
Umpires: Eric Kannangara and Hemantha Boteju

- Chilaw Marians Cricket Club won the toss and elected to bat.
- Kasun Weeranga (Chilaw Marians Cricket Club) made his List A debut.

20 November 2021
Scorecard

Tamil Union Cricket and Athletic Club	v	Bloomfield Cricket and Athletic Club

Match abandoned
P Sara Oval, Colombo
Umpires: Asanga Jayasooriya and Palitha de Alwis

- No toss.

20 November 2021
Scorecard

Galle Cricket Club; 163/9 (45 overs)	v	Sebastianites Cricket and Athletic Club; 164/6 (41.3 overs)
Lisula Lakshan 34 (54); Chamikara Edirisinghe 3/24 (9 overs)		Tharusha Fernando 75* (88); Hareen Buddila 2/22 (9 overs)

Sebastianites Cricket and Athletic Club won by 4 wickets
Sri Lanka Army Ordnance Corps International Cricket Stadium, Horana
Umpires: Krishantha Rodrigo and Pradeep Udawatta

- Sebastianites Cricket and Athletic Club won the toss and elected to field.
- Subhanu Rajapaksa (Galle Cricket Club) made his List A debut.

20 November 2021
Scorecard

Panadura Sports Club; 170 (44.3 overs)	v	Police Sports Club; 171/5 (34.2 overs)
Shanuka Dulaj 64 (107); Asel Sigera 4/30 (9 overs)		Maduranga Zoysa 51 (67); Nimesh Vimukthi 2/33 (10 overs)

Police Sports Club won by 5 wickets
Police Park Ground, Colombo
Umpires: Kapila Kottahachchi and Sanjeewa Fernando

- Police Sports Club won the toss and elected to field.

21 November 2021
Scorecard

Sebastianites Cricket and Athletic Club; 170 (31.5 overs)	v	Saracens Sports Club; 171/3 (31 overs)
Sachitha Jayathilake 61* (32); Udith Madushan 4/56 (4.5 overs)		Sithara Gimhan 51 (46); Chamikara Edirisinghe 1/23 (7 overs)

Saracens Sports Club won by 7 wickets
De Soysa Stadium, Moratuwa
Umpires: Chandrika Amarasinghe and Deepal Gunawardene

- Sebastianites Cricket and Athletic Club won the toss and elected to bat.

21 November 2021
Scorecard

Tamil Union Cricket and Athletic Club	v	Ragama Cricket Club

Match abandoned
P Sara Oval, Colombo
Umpires: Dilshan de Silva and Ranganath Prasanna

- No toss.

21 November 2021
Scorecard

Chilaw Marians Cricket Club; 275 (49 overs)	v	Police Sports Club; 221 (45 overs)
Thikshila de Silva 106* (65); Chathuranga Kumara 2/5 (3 overs)		Chathuranga Kumara 52 (54); Avindu Theekshana 3/38 (10 overs)

Chilaw Marians Cricket Club won by 54 runs
Police Park Ground, Colombo
Umpires: Gamini Gunasekera and Rohitha Kottahachchi

- Police Sports Club won the toss and elected to field.

21 November 2021
Scorecard

Ace Capital Cricket Club	v	Colts Cricket Club

Match abandoned
FTZ Sports Complex, Katunayake
Umpires: Keerthi Bandara and Namal Kumara

- No toss.

22 November 2021
Scorecard

Saracens Sports Club; 123 (32.5 overs)	v	Tamil Union Cricket and Athletic Club; 124/8 (33.5 overs)
Sithara Gimhan 56 (54); Jeffrey Vandersay 5/13 (6 overs)		Navod Paranavithana 60 (74); Kavika Dilshan 4/21 (8 overs)

Tamil Union Cricket and Athletic Club won by 2 wickets
P Sara Oval, Colombo
Umpires: Krishantha Rodrigo and Thilak Fernando

- Tamil Union Cricket and Athletic Club won the toss and elected to field.

22 November 2021
Scorecard

Sinhalese Sports Club; 252/8 (50 overs)	v	Badureliya Sports Club; 105 (33.5 overs)
Shammu Ashan 84* (53); Ruchira Koshitha 2/46 (10 overs)		Alankara Asanka Silva 33 (67); Prabath Jayasuriya 3/23 (10 overs)

Sinhalese Sports Club won by 147 runs
Surrey Village Cricket Ground, Maggona
Umpires: Dilshan de Silva and Rohitha Kottahachchi

- Badureliya Sports Club won the toss and elected to field.
- Pasindu Shasanka (Badureliya Sports Club) made his List A debut.

23 November 2021
Scorecard

Badureliya Sports Club; 182 (45.2 overs)	v	Ragama Cricket Club; 183/5 (28.3 overs)
Sandun Weerakkody 66 (77); Shashika Dulshan 3/30 (8 overs)		Janith Liyanage 65* (63); Ravishka Wijesiri 2/41 (6.3 overs)

Ragama Cricket Club won by 5 wickets
Surrey Village Cricket Ground, Maggona
Umpires: Gamini Gunasekera and Sisira Kumara

- Badureliya Sports Club won the toss and elected to bat.

23 November 2021
Scorecard

Colts Cricket Club; 222 (49.3 overs)	v	Sebastianites Cricket and Athletic Club; 104/6 (20 overs)
Sangeeth Cooray 69 (120); Madushan Ravichandrakumar 3/36 (10 overs)		Adeesha Nanayakkara 29 (25); Mohamed Shiraz 3/18 (5 overs)

Colts Cricket Club won by 46 runs (DLS method)
Colts Cricket Club Ground, Colombo
Umpires: Chaminda Hathurusingha and Pradeep Udawatta

- Sebastianites Cricket and Athletic Club won the toss and elected to field.
- Sebastianites Cricket and Athletic Club were set a revised target of 153 runs from 20 overs due to rain.

23 November 2021
Scorecard

Galle Cricket Club; 206 (44.1 overs)	v	Panadura Sports Club; 207/7 (42 overs)
Chanaka Ruwansiri 72 (62); Malinga Amarasinghe 4/35 (9 overs)		Shanuka Dulaj 70 (81); Dilshan Kanchana 2/28 (5 overs)

Panadura Sports Club won by 3 wickets
Panadura Esplanade, Panadura
Umpires: Palitha de Alwis and Sanjeewa Fernando

- Panadura Sports Club won the toss and elected to field.

23 November 2021
Scorecard

Tamil Union Cricket and Athletic Club; 105 (34 overs)	v	Police Sports Club; 108/9 (16.2 overs)
Ravindu Fernando 22 (24); Nisala Tharaka 3/22 (7 overs)		Tillakaratne Sampath 29 (24); Jeffrey Vandersay 5/44 (7 overs)

Police Sports Club won by 1 wicket
Police Park Ground, Colombo
Umpires: Chandrika Amarasinghe and Ravindra Kottahachchi

- Tamil Union Cricket and Athletic Club won the toss and elected to bat.

24 November 2021
Scorecard

Sebastianites Cricket and Athletic Club	v	Bloomfield Cricket and Athletic Club

Match abandoned
De Soysa Stadium, Moratuwa
Umpires: R P Massalage and Sisira Kumara

- No toss.

24 November 2021
Scorecard

Police Sports Club; 171 (33.3 overs)	v	Colts Cricket Club; 109 (21.1 overs)
Tillakaratne Sampath 51 (76); Akila Dananjaya 3/31 (7 overs)		Sangeeth Cooray 33 (30); Nalin Priyadarshana 5/39 (7 overs)

Police Sports Club won by 62 runs
Colts Cricket Club Ground, Colombo
Umpires: Nilan De Silva and Ranjith Vishwakula

- Police Sports Club won the toss and elected to bat.

24 November 2021
Scorecard

Panadura Sports Club; 144 (26.1 overs)	v	Saracens Sports Club; 30/1 (7 overs)
Shanuka Dulaj 45 (54); Udith Madushan 3/34 (5 overs)		Sithara Gimhan 13 (18); Nimesh Vimukthi 1/3 (1 over)

No result
Surrey Village Cricket Ground, Maggona
Umpires: Pradeep Udawatta and Saman Mohan de Silva

- Panadura Sports Club won the toss and elected to bat.
- Tharindu Lamahewage (Saracens Sports Club) made his List A debut.

24 November 2021
Scorecard

Sinhalese Sports Club	v	Ace Capital Cricket Club

Match abandoned
Sinhalese Sports Club Ground, Colombo
Umpires: Damith Sanjeewa and Rohitha Kottahachchi

- No toss.

24 November 2021
Scorecard

Chilaw Marians Cricket Club; 192 (32.5 overs)	v	Galle Cricket Club; 96/1 (15.1 overs)
Rumesh Buddika 50 (49); Subhanu Rajapaksa 3/32 (7 overs)		Yashodha Lanka 46 (42); Thikshila de Silva 1/18 (4.1 overs)

No result
FTZ Sports Complex, Katunayake
Umpires: Gamini Dissanayake and Namal Kumara

- Galle Cricket Club won the toss and elected to field.
- Nuwan Priyadarshana (Galle Cricket Club) made his List A debut.

25 November 2021
Scorecard

Colts Cricket Club; 73/1 (11 overs)	v	Ace Capital Cricket Club
Avishka Perera 35* (28)

No result
FTZ Sports Complex, Katunayake

- Colts Cricket Club won the toss and elected to bat.
- Thashika Nirmal (Ace Capital Cricket Club) made his List A debut.

26 November 2021
Scorecard

Ace Capital Cricket Club	v	Panadura Sports Club

Match abandoned
Sri Lanka Army Ordnance Corps International Cricket Stadium, Horana
Umpires: Ravindra Kottahachchi and Sanjeewa Fernando

- No toss.

27 November 2021
Scorecard

Bloomfield Cricket and Athletic Club; 230/9 (50 overs)	v	Ace Capital Cricket Club; 134/9 (35 overs)
Kasun Ekanayake 91 (112); Pramud Hettiwatte 4/44 (8 overs)		Hasitha Perera 44 (55); Dileepa Jayalath 3/12 (6 overs)

Bloomfield Cricket and Athletic Club won by 84 runs (DLS method)
Bloomfield Cricket and Athletic Club Ground, Colombo
Umpires: Deepal Gunawardene and Ranganath Prasanna

- Bloomfield Cricket and Athletic Club Ground won the toss and elected to bat.
- Ace Capital Cricket Club were set a revised target of 219 runs from 35 overs due to rain.
- MG Wathugedera, PAD Dabare, YC Kankanamge (Ace Capital Cricket Club) and TN Bakmeewewa (Bloomfield Cricket and Athletic Club) all made their List A debuts.

== Finals ==
1st Semi-final
28–29 November 2021
Scorecard

Ragama Cricket Club; 114/5 (31 overs)	v	Nondescripts Cricket Club
Nishan Madushka 41* (78); Sachindu Colombage 3/26 (8 overs)

No result
Sri Lanka Army Ordnance Corps International Cricket Stadium, Horana
Umpires: Hemantha Boteju and Ravindra Kottahachchi

- Nondescripts Cricket Club won the toss and elected to field.

2nd Semi-final
28–29 November 2021
Scorecard

Tamil Union Cricket and Athletic Club; 242 (50 overs)	v	Sri Lanka Army Sports Club; 179 (32.5 overs)
Sadeera Samarawickrama 50 (85); Heshan Hettiarchchi 3/42 (7 overs)		Asela Gunaratne 40 (50); Pramod Madushan 3/30 (5.5 overs)

Tamil Union Cricket and Athletic Club won by 47 runs (DLS method)
Surrey Village Cricket Ground, Maggona
Umpires: Asanga Jayasooriya and Rohitha Kottahachchi

- Sri Lanka Army Sports Club won the toss and elected to field.
- Sri Lanka Army Sports Club were set a revised target of 227 runs from 32.5 overs due to rain.

Final
30 November 2021
Scorecard

Tamil Union Cricket and Athletic Club; 181/9 (50 overs)	v	Ragama Cricket Club; 145 (32.4 overs)
Santhush Gunathilake 47 (76); Kalhara Senarathne 2/22 (5 overs)		Saminda Fernando 38 (58); Jeffrey Vandersay 5/27 (7.4 overs)

Tamil Union Cricket and Athletic Club won by 36 runs
P Sara Oval, Colombo
Umpires: Deepal Gunawardene and Keerthi Bandara

- Ragama Cricket Club won the toss and elected to field.
