= 2019 ACC Under-19 Asia Cup =

Cricket tournament

2019 Under-19 Asia Cup
- Dates: 5 September – 14 September 2019
- Administrator: Asian Cricket Council
- Cricket format: 50-over
- Tournament format(s): Round-robin, playoffs
- Host: Sri Lanka
- Champions: India (7th title)
- Runners-up: Bangladesh
- Participants: 8
- Matches: 15
- Most runs: (India) Arjun Azad (202)
- Most wickets: (India) Atharva Ankolekar (12)
- Official website: ACC U19 Asia Cup 2019

The 2019 Under-19 Asia Cup was the 8th edition of ACC Under-19 Cup. The cricket tournament was held in Sri Lanka from 5 to 15 September 2019. 8 teams participated in the tournament, including 5 full members and three qualifiers.

== Teams ==
No.	Teams	Qualification method
1	India	ICC Full Member
2	Pakistan	ICC Full Member
3	Bangladesh	ICC Full Member
4	Sri Lanka	ICC Full Member
5	Afghanistan	ICC Full Member
6	Kuwait	Qualifiers
7	Nepal	Qualifiers
8	United Arab Emirates	Qualifiers

== Squads ==
Afghanistan	Bangladesh	India	Kuwait	Nepal	Pakistan	Sri Lanka	United Arab Emirates
Farhan Zakhil (c); Sediqullah Atal; Asif Musazai; Rahmanullah Zadran; Abdullah Naib; Islam Zazai; Nangialai Kharoti; Shafiqullah Ghafari; Jamshid Khan; Noor Ahmad; Abdul Rahman; Fazal Haq; Abidullah Taniwal; Mohammad Ishaq (wk); Ahmad Zahir Pathan	Akbar Ali (c); Towhid Hridoy; Tanzid Hasan; Mahmudul Hasan Joy; Shahadat Hossain; Anik Sarker Shatu; Shamim Hossain; Parvez Hossain Emon; Rakibul Hasan; Mrittunjoy Chowdhury; Tanzim Hasan Sakib; Shahin Alam; Minhazur Rahman; Ashraful Islam Siam; Shoriful Islam	Dhruv Jurel (c); Suved Parkar; Tilak Varma; Nehal Wadhera; Arjun Azad; Shashwat Rawat; Varun Lavande; Salil Arora; Karan Lal; Atharva Ankolekar; Pankaj Yadav; Akash Singh; Sushant Mishra; Purnank Tyagi; Vidhyadhar Patil	Abdul Sadiq (c); Aamir Ali; Abdullah Zaheer; Abdul Rehman; Ahmed Majed; Meet Bhavsar (wk); Faez Qureshi; Gokul Kumar; Govind Kumar; Jandu Hamoud; Saem Mohammad; A Sanjeev Nair; Umer Abdullah; Usman Mohammad; Zeeshan Jilani	Rohit Kumar Paudel (c); Pawan Sarraf; Aasif Sheikh; Sundeep Jora; Bhim Sharki; Kamal Airee; Khadak Bohara; Rit Gautam; Rashid Khan; Pratis GC; Sagar Dhakal; Surya Tamang; Kushal Malla; Hari Chauhan; Lokesh Bam	Rohail Nazir (c & wk); Aamir Ali; Abdul Bangalzai; Abu Huraira; Akhtar Shah; Fahad Munir; Haider Ali; Haris Khan; Irfan Khan; Mohammad Amir Khan; Abbas Afridi; Mohammad Basit Ali; Mohammad Wasim; Naseem Shah; Qasim Akram	Nipun Dhananjaya (c); Ravindu Rasantha; Abhishek Kahaduwaarachchi; Sandun Mendis; Kavindu Nadeeshan; Ahan Wickramasinghe; Navod Paranavithana; Kamil Mishara; Ashian Daniel; Dilshan Madushanka; Chamindu Wijesinghe; Amshi de Silva; Yasiru Rodrigo; Avishka Tharindu; Rohan Sanjaya	Palaniapan Meiyappan (c); Aaron Benjuman; Ansh Tandon; Alishan Sharafu; Akash Tahir; Anand Kumar; Ashwant Valthapa; Muhammad Farazuddin; Niel Lobo; Osama Hassan; Rishabh Mukherjee; Sanchit Sharma; Syed Haider; Tasin Rehman; Vriitya Aravind (wk)

== Group stage ==
=== Group A ===
==== Points table ====
Team	Pld	W	L	NR	T	NRR	Pts
India	3	3	0	0	0	+1.178	6
Afghanistan	3	2	1	0	0	+1.266	4
Pakistan	3	1	2	0	0	+0.123	2
Kuwait	3	0	3	0	0	−3.541	0

5 September 2019
Scorecard

Kuwait; 110/7 (23 overs)	v	India; 114/3 (18.1 overs)
Meet Bhavsar 28 (41); Akash Singh 3/22 (5 overs)		Arjun Azad 60* (58); Faez Qureshi 1/15 (5 overs)

India Under-19s won by 7 wickets
Colombo Cricket Club Ground, Colombo
Umpires: Deepal Gunawardena (SL) and Gazi Sohel (BAN)
Player of the match: Arjun Azad (IND)

- India Under-19s won the toss and elected to field.
- Match was reduced to 23 overs per side due to rain.

5 September 2019
Scorecard

Afghanistan; 162/9 (46 overs)	v	Pakistan; 78 (19.4 overs)
Sediqullah Atal 29 (42); Fahad Munir 3/23 (9 overs)		Irfan Khan 19 (30); Shafiqullah Ghafari 3/15 (4 overs)

Afghanistan Under-19s won by 85 runs (DLS)
P Sara Oval, Colombo
Umpires: Hemantha Boteju (SL) and Anil Chaudhary (IND)
Player of the match: Shafiqullah Ghafari (AFG)

- Pakistan Under-19s won the toss and elected to field.
- Match was reduced to 46 overs per side due to rain.
- Pakistan were given revised target of 164 in 46 overs.

7 September 2019
Scorecard

India; 305/9 (50 overs)	v	Pakistan; 245 (46.4 overs)
Arjun Azad 121 (111); Naseem Shah 3/52 (10 overs)		Rohail Nazir 117 (108); Atharva Ankolekar 3/36 (10 overs)

India Under-19s won by 60 runs
Tyronne Fernando Stadium, Moratuwa
Umpires: Deepal Gunawardena (SL) and Gazi Sohel (BAN)
Player of the match: Arjun Azad (IND)

- India Under-19s won the toss and elected to bat.

7 September 2019
Scorecard

Kuwait; 85 (27.3 overs)	v	Afghanistan; 86/3 (12.5 overs)
Meet Bhavsar 20 (41); Shafiqullah Ghafari 3/12 (7 overs)		Farhan Zakhil 38* (37); Faez Qureshi 1/6 (2 overs)

Afghanistan Under-19s won by 7 wickets
R. Premadasa Stadium, Colombo
Umpires: Sarika Prasad (SING) and Keerthi Bandara (SL)
Player of the match: Shafiqullah Ghafari (AFG)

- Afghanistan Under-19s won the toss and elected to field.

9 September 2019
Scorecard

Afghanistan; 124 (40.1 overs)	v	India; 128/7 (38.4 overs)
Abidullah Taniwal 39 (60); Sushant Mishra 5/20 (9.1 overs)		Shashwat Rawat 29 (45); Noor Ahmad 4/30 (10 overs)

India Under-19s won by 3 wickets
Colombo Cricket Club Ground, Colombo
Umpires: Asif Yaqoob (PAK) and Buddhi Pradhan (SING)
Player of the match: Sushant Mishra (IND)

- Afghanistan Under-19s won the toss and elected to bat.

9 September 2019
Scorecard

Pakistan; 335/9 (50 overs)	v	Kuwait; 172 (43.4 overs)
Irfan Khan 63 (68); Jandu Hamoud 4/60 (10 overs)		Abdul Sadiq 60 (105); Qasim Akram 4/38 (6.4 overs)

Pakistan Under-19s won by 163 runs
Tyronne Fernando Stadium, Moratuwa
Umpires: Ravindra Kottahachchi (SL) and Anil Chaudhary (IND)
Player of the match: Mohammad Wasim (PAK)

- Pakistan Under-19s won the toss and elected to bat.

=== Group B ===
==== Points table ====
Team	Pld	W	L	NR	T	NRR	Pts
Bangladesh	3	3	0	0	0	+1.218	6
Sri Lanka	3	2	1	0	0	+0.392	4
Nepal	3	1	2	0	0	+0.852	2
United Arab Emirates	3	0	3	0	0	−2.455	0

6 September 2019
Scorecard

Nepal; 159/9 (42 overs)	v	Sri Lanka; 159/5 (33.4 overs)
Rit Gautham 54 (85); Dilshan Madushanka 3/23 (8 overs)		Kamil Mishara 55 (62); Rashid Khan 2/21 (6.4 overs)

Sri Lanka Under-19s won by 5 wickets (DLS)
R. Premadasa Stadium, Colombo
Umpires: Asif Yaqoob (PAK) and Ahmed Shah Durrani (AFG)
Player of the match: Kamil Mishara (SL)

- Nepal Under-19s won the toss and elected to bat.
- Due to rain during Nepal innings, match was reduced to 42 overs per side.
- Sri Lanka were given a revised target of 159.

6 September 2019
Scorecard

United Arab Emirates; 127 (28 overs)	v	Bangladesh; 128/4 (21.3 overs)
Osama Hassan 58 (65); Rakibul Hasan 3/25 (7 overs)		Tanzid Hasan 45 (27); Rishabh Mukherjee 2/27 (3.3 overs)

Bangladesh Under-19s won by 6 wickets
FTZ Sports Complex, Katunayake
Umpires: Ravindra Kottahachchi (SL) and Buddhi Pradhan (NEP)
Player of the match: Tanzid Hasan (BAN)

- Bangladesh Under-19s won the toss and elected to field.
- Due to rain, match was reduced to 45 overs per side.

8 September 2019
Scorecard

Sri Lanka; 326/8 (50 overs)	v	United Arab Emirates; 274/9 (50 overs)
Navod Paranavithana 61 (60); Rishabh Mukherjee 3/65 (10 overs)		Ansh Tandon 100* (102); Navod Paranavithana 4/54 (8 overs)

Sri Lanka Under-19s won by 60 runs
FTZ Sports Complex, Katunayake
Umpires: Ahmed Shah Durrani (AFG) and Sarika Prasad (SING)
Player of the match: Navod Paranavithana (SL)

- United Arab Emirates Under-19s won the toss and elected to field.

8 September 2019
Scorecard

Nepal; 261/8 (50 overs)	v	Bangladesh; 262/4 (49.2 overs)
Pawan Sarraf 81 (109); Tanzim Hasan Sakib 2/51 (9 overs)		Akbar Ali 98* (82); Kamal Airee 2/59 (8 overs)

Bangladesh Under-19s won by 6 wickets
P Sara Oval, Colombo
Umpires: Anil Chaudhary (IND) and Keerthi Bandara (SL)
Player of the match: Akbar Ali (BAN)

- Bangladesh Under-19s won the toss and elected to field.

10 September 2019
Scorecard

Bangladesh; 273/7 (50 overs)	v	Sri Lanka; 231 (47.4 overs)
Mahmudul Hasan Joy 126 (140); Dilshan Madushanka 3/54 (10 overs)		Rohan Sanjaya 42 (36); Rakibul Hasan 3/49 (10 overs)

Bangladesh Under-19s won by 42 runs
Tyronne Fernando Stadium, Moratuwa
Umpires: Ahmed Shah Durrani (AFG) and Asif Yaqoob (PAK)
Player of the match: Mahmudul Hasan Joy (BAN)

- Bangladesh Under-19s won the toss and elected to bat.

10 September 2019
Scorecard

Nepal; 285/9 (50 overs)	v	United Arab Emirates; 125 (34.4 overs)
Rohit Kumar Paudel 67 (84); Sanchit Sharma 3/26 (10 overs)		Vriitya Aravind 28 (34); Sagar Dhakal 3/20 (7 overs)

Nepal Under-19s won by 160 runs
FTZ Sports Complex, Katunayake
Umpires: Hemantha Boteju (SL) and Gazi Sohel (BAN)
Player of the match: Rohit Kumar Paudel (NEP)

- United Arab Emirates Under-19s won the toss and elected to field.

== Knockout stage ==
=== Bracket ===
Semifinals
A1	India
B2	Sri Lanka
B1	Bangladesh
A2	Afghanistan

Final
A1	India	106 (32.4)
B1	Bangladesh	101 (33)

=== Semi finals ===
12 September 2019
10:00
Scorecard

India	v	Sri Lanka

Match abandoned without a ball bowled
P Sara Oval, Colombo

- No toss
- India Under-19s advanced to the final due to more wins than Sri Lanka during group stage.

12 September 2019
10:00
Scorecard

Afghanistan	v	Bangladesh

Match abandoned without a ball bowled
Tyronne Fernando Stadium, Moratuwa

- No toss
- Bangladesh Under-19s advanced to the final due to more wins than Afghanistan during group stage.

=== Final ===
14 September 2019
10:00
Scorecard

India; 106 (32.4 overs)	v	Bangladesh; 101 (33 overs)
Karan Lal 37 (43); Shamim Hossain 3/8 (6 overs)		Akbar Ali 23 (36); Atharva Ankolekar 5/28 (8 overs)

India Under-19s won by 5 runs
R. Premadasa Stadium, Colombo
Umpires: Asif Yaqoob (PAK) and Ahmed Shah Durrani (AFG)
Player of the match: Atharva Ankolekar (Ind)

- India Under-19s won the toss and elected to bat.

== Statistics ==
=== Most runs ===
Runs	Player	Inns	HS	Ave	SR	100	50	4s	6s
202	(India) Arjun Azad	4	121	67.33	105.75	1	1	20	6
194	(Bangladesh) Mahmudul Hasan Joy	4	126	64.66	79.83	1	0	19	2
167	(Pakistan) Rohail Nazir	3	117	55.66	94.35	1	0	16	5
Last updated: 14 September 2019

== Final standings ==
Pos.	Team
1	India
2	Bangladesh
3	Afghanistan
4	Sri Lanka
5	Nepal
6	Pakistan
7	United Arab Emirates
8	Kuwait
