= Priyadarshana =

Priyadarshana or Priyadarshan is a name of Sanskrit origin. Notable people with this name include:

== Given name ==
- Priyadasi, an ancient Indian regnal name or honorific title, usually associated with Ashoka (304–232 BCE)
- Priyadarshan, Indian filmmaker
  - Priyadarshan filmography
- Priyadarshan Jadhav, Indian actor and director

== Surname ==
- Mahesh Priyadarshana (born 1981)
- Nalin Priyadarshana (born 1990)
- Nuwan Priyadarshana (born 1993)

== See also ==
- Piyadasi (disambiguation)
