= Avishka =

Avishka is a given name. Notable people with the name include:

- Avishka Chenuka (born 1999), Sri Lankan cricketer
- Avishka Fernando (born 1998), Sri Lankan cricketer
- Avishka Fernando (Kilinochchi District cricketer), Sri Lankan cricketer
- Avishka Gunawardene (born 1977), Sri Lankan cricketer
- Avishka Perera (born 2001), Sri Lankan cricketer
- Avishka Tharindu (born 2001), Sri Lankan cricketer
