= List of Badureliya Sports Club cricketers =

List of first-class cricketers by club

This is an incomplete list in alphabetical order of cricketers who have played for Badureliya Sports Club in top-class (Note: Top-class matches are first-class, List A, and Twenty20.) matches since the club initially achieved first-class status in 2005.

== Key ==
- † preceding a player's name means that the original article is now a redirect to this list.

== D ==
- D. D. de Soysa
- G. H. V. Dulsara

== F ==
- K. W. S. L. Fernando

== K ==
- M. K. G. N. Koralage
- H. G. Kumara

== M ==
- G. V. M. Madubashana

== N ==
- W. K. Nuwantha

== S ==
- B. B. Sanjeewa
- A. A. S. Silva
- A. Siriwardhana

== W ==
- W. G. R. L. Wijenayake
