= Malindu =

Malindu is a given name. Notable people with the name include:

- Malindu Maduranga (born 1997), Sri Lankan cricketer
- Malindu Shehan (born 1994), Sri Lankan cricketer
