= Jeewaka =

Jeewaka is a given name. Notable people with the name include:

- Jeewaka Ruwan Kulatunga, Sri Lankan general
- Jeewaka Shashen (born 2003), Sri Lankan cricketer
