= Wijenayake =

Wijenayake is a surname. Notable people with the surname include:

- Kemira Wijenayake (born 2001), Sri Lankan cricketer
- Piyasiri Wijenayake, Sri Lankan politician
