= Yuran Nimasha =

Sri Lankan cricketer (born 1998)

Personal information
- Full name: Godagama Archchige Yuran Nimasha Maduranga
- Born: 18 December 1998 (age 27)
- Source: Cricinfo, 2 February 2019

Yuran Nimasha (born 18 December 1998) is a Sri Lankan cricketer. He made his first-class debut for Colombo Cricket Club in the 2018–19 Premier League Tournament on 31 January 2019. He made his List A debut on 3 November 2021, for Burgher Recreation Club in the 2021–22 Major Clubs Limited Over Tournament.
