= Suhanga Wijewardana =

Sri Lankan cricketer (born 1999)

Personal information
- Full name: Suhanga Dinidu Wijewardana
- Born: 20 July 1999 (age 27)
- Source: Cricinfo, 6 January 2020

Suhanga Wijewardana (born 20 July 1999) is a Sri Lankan cricketer. He made his Twenty20 debut on 6 January 2020, for Unichela Sports Club in the 2019–20 SLC Twenty20 Tournament. He made his List A debut on 21 November 2021, for Sri Lanka Navy Sports Club in the 2021–22 Major Clubs Limited Over Tournament.
