= Prabath de Zoysa =

Sri Lankan cricketer (born 1999)

Personal information
- Born: 24 October 1999 (age 27); Colombo, Sri Lanka
- Source: Cricinfo, 14 July 2020

Prabath de Zoysa (born 24 October 1999) is a Sri Lankan cricketer. He made his first-class debut for Sebastianites Cricket and Athletic Club in Tier B of the 2019–20 Premier League Tournament on 6 February 2020. He made his List A debut on 11 November 2021, for Galle Cricket Club in the 2021–22 Major Clubs Limited Over Tournament.
