= Vinuda Liyanage =

Sri Lankan cricketer (born 2002)

Personal information
- Born: 20 March 2002 (age 24)

Domestic team information
- Years: Team
- 2021/22: Lankan Cricket Club
- Source: Cricinfo, 3 November 2021

Vinuda Liyanage (born 20 March 2002) is a Sri Lankan cricketer. He made his List A debut on 3 November 2021, for Lankan Cricket Club in the 2021–22 Major Clubs Limited Over Tournament.
