= Praveen Sandamal =

Sri Lankan cricketer (born 1991)

Personal information
- Born: 31 December 1991 (age 34)
- Source: Cricinfo, 27 August 2020

Praveen Sandamal (born 31 December 1991) is a Sri Lankan cricketer. He made his first-class debut for Saracens Sports Club in the 2019–20 Premier League Tournament on 25 August 2020. He made his List A debut on 27 October 2021, for Saracens Sports Club in the 2021–22 Major Clubs Limited Over Tournament. He made his Twenty20 debut on 22 May 2022, for Saracens Sports Club in the Major Clubs T20 Tournament.
