= Sohan de Livera =

Sri Lankan cricketer (born 2000)

Personal information
- Born: 17 August 2000 (age 26)

International information
- National side: Sri Lanka (2023 present)
- Only T20I: 1 October 2026 v India
- Source: Cricinfo, 2 February 2020

Sohan de Livera (born 17 August 2000) is a Sri Lankan cricketer. He made his first-class debut on 31 January 2020, for Sinhalese Sports Club in the 2019–20 Premier League Tournament. He made his Twenty20 debut on 4 March 2021, for Sinhalese Sports Club in the 2020–21 SLC Twenty20 Tournament. Sinhalese Sports Club went on to win the tournament for the first time since 2005. He made his List A debut on 31 October 2021, for Moors Sports Club in the 2021–22 Major Clubs Limited Over Tournament.
