= Navod Paranavithana =

Sri Lankan cricketer (born 2002)

Personal information
- Born: 16 May 2002 (age 24); Galle, Sri Lanka
- Batting: Left-handed
- Bowling: Left-arm medium
- Role: All-rounder

Domestic team information
- Years: Team
- 2021/22: Tamil Union
- Only List A: 27 October 2021 Tamil Union v Sebastianites
- Source: Cricinfo, 27 October 2021

Navod Paranavithana (born 16 May 2002) is a Sri Lankan cricketer. In January 2020, he was named in Sri Lanka's squad for the 2020 Under-19 Cricket World Cup. In March 2020, Paranavithana became the first batsman to score a quadruple century in a school match in Sri Lanka. He made his List A debut on 27 October 2021, for Tamil Union Cricket and Athletic Club in the 2021–22 Major Clubs Limited Over Tournament. He made his Twenty20 debut on 23 May 2022, for Tamil Union Cricket and Athletic Club in the Major Clubs T20 Tournament.

In July 2022, he was signed by the Colombo Stars for the third edition of the Lanka Premier League.
