= Naveen Fernando =

Sri Lankan cricketer (born 2001)

Personal information
- Born: 30 September 2001 (age 25)
- Source: Cricinfo, 10 March 2021

Naveen Fernando (born 30 December 2001) is a Sri Lankan cricketer. He made his Twenty20 debut on 10 March 2021, for Chilaw Marians Cricket Club in the 2020–21 SLC Twenty20 Tournament. He made his List A debut on 28 October 2021, for Nugegoda Sports and Welfare Club in the 2021–22 Major Clubs Limited Over Tournament.
