= Senal de Silva =

Sri Lankan cricketer

Personal information
- Full name: Senal de Silva
- Source: Cricinfo, 7 April 2017

Senal de Silva is a Sri Lankan cricketer. He made his List A debut for Hambantota District in the 2016–17 Districts One Day Tournament on 17 March 2017. He made his Twenty20 debut on 22 May 2022, for Badureliya Sports Club in the Major Clubs T20 Tournament.
