= Sasika Dilshan =

Sri Lankan cricketer (born 1999)

Personal information
- Born: 30 November 1999 (age 26)
- Source: Cricinfo, 12 March 2021

Sasika Dilshan (born 30 November 1999) is a Sri Lankan cricketer. He made his Twenty20 debut on 12 March 2021, for Sri Lanka Army Sports Club in the 2020–21 SLC Twenty20 Tournament. He made his List A debut on 17 November 2021, for Sri Lanka Army Sports Club in the 2021–22 Major Clubs Limited Over Tournament.
