= Piyadasi =

Piyadasi/Piyadassi (Pali) or Priyadarshi/Priyadarshini (Sanskrit) literally means "one who looks with kindness upon [everything]" (Sanskrit priya-darśin, feminine priya-darśinī). It may refer to:

- Priyadarshi (actor) (born 1989), Indian actor and comedian in Telugu cinema
- Priyadarshini (film), a 1978 Indian Malayalam-language film
- Priyadarshini (singer), Indian playback singer
- Priyadarshini Ram (born 1955), Indian Telugu filmmaker
- Priyadasi, an ancient Indian regnal name or honorific title, usually associated with Ashoka (304–232 BCE)
- Piyadassi Maha Thera (1914–1998), Sri Lankan Buddhist preacher
- Indira Priyadarshini Gandhi (1919–1984), Prime Minister of India
- Tenzin Priyadarshi, Indian Buddhist leader

== See also ==
- Priyadarshana (disambiguation)
