= Air Force Ground =

Cricket ground in Sri Lanka

Ground information
- Location: Katunayake, Sri Lanka
- Capacity: 10,000
- Owner: Sri Lanka Air Force
- Operator: Sri Lanka Air Force
- Tenants: Sri Lankan Air Force Sports Club
- End names
- Camp End; Athletic Ground End

Team information
Sri Lanka Air Force Sports Club	(1985–present)
- As of 23 February 2019; Source: Cricinfo

Air Force Ground is a cricket ground in Katunayake, Sri Lanka. It has been the home of Sri Lanka Air Force Sports Club since 1985.

The ground was selected to host the third match of England Women's tour of Sri Lanka in 2018-19.
