= Atharva Ankolekar =

Indian cricketer (born 2000)

Personal information
- Full name: Atharva Vinod Ankolekar
- Born: 26 September 2000 (age 26); Mumbai, Maharashtra, India
- Nickname: Bandya
- Batting: Left-handed
- Bowling: Slow left-arm orthodox
- Role: All-rounder
- Source: ESPNcricinfo, 28 January 2020

Atharva Ankolekar (born 26 September 2000) is an Indian cricketer who plays for India Under-19s. He was the highest wicket-taker at the 2019 ACC Under-19 Asia Cup and player of the match in the final. He made his senior debut for Mumbai in January 2021.

== Early and personal life ==
Ankolekar was born on 26 September 2000 into a lower-middle-class family. His father Vinod Ankolekar, an employee at the electricity department of BEST and Kanga League cricketer, wanted him to become a professional cricketer and placed a cricket bat near his crib on the day of his birth. After being initially coached by his father, Ankolekar was trained for one season at Chandrakant Pandit's academy but later had to switch to MIG Cricket Club due to financial constraints. His father died in 2010 due to malaria and dengue.

Ankolekar's family struggled to make ends meet after his father's death, even as Ankolekar's mother Vaidehi Ankolekar worked part-time as a private tutor. In 2014, Vaidehi started working as a bus conductor for BEST.

He completed his schooling from Parle Tilak Vidyalaya English Medium School(Vile Parle). And studied commerce at the Rizvi College of Arts, Science and Commerce in Mumbai.

== Career ==
Ankolekar made steady progress through Mumbai's age-group teams, before being selected for India B in the Under-19 Challenger Trophy and Mumbai under-23 squad in 2019. He was selected in the 15-member Indian squad for the 2019 ACC Under-19 Asia Cup. He picked 12 wickets in the tournament, including a match-winning 5/28 in the final against Bangladesh, to finish as the highest wicket-taker. Earlier in the tournament, he had taken 3/36 against Pakistan and 4/16 against Afghanistan. In the aftermath of the Asia Cup victory, Ankolekar gained selection in the Mumbai senior team for the 2019–20 Vijay Hazare Trophy.

In December 2019, he was named in India's squad for the 2020 Under-19 Cricket World Cup. After sitting out of India's first two matches in the tournament, Ankolekar's spell of 3/28 in the final group stage match against New Zealand drew praise. Batting at number 7 in the quarterfinal against Australia, he scored 55 runs off 54 balls to help India post 233/9 and eventually win the match.

He made his Twenty20 debut on 13 January 2021, for Mumbai in the 2020–21 Syed Mushtaq Ali Trophy. He made his List A debut on 25 February 2021, for Mumbai in the 2020–21 Vijay Hazare Trophy.

== Playing style ==
Ankolekar initially played as a lower-order batsman, and started bowling left-arm orthodox spin on a regular basis at the insistence of his coach.
