= Kemira Wijenayake =

Sri Lankan cricketer (born 2001)

Personal information
- Born: 10 October 2001 (age 25)
- Source: Cricinfo, 6 March 2021

Kemira Wijenayake (born 10 October 2001) is a Sri Lankan cricketer. He made his Twenty20 debut on 6 March 2021, for Bloomfield Cricket and Athletic Club in the 2020–21 SLC Twenty20 Tournament. He made his List A debut on 27 October 2021, for Sri Lanka Air Force Sports Club in the 2021–22 Major Clubs Limited Over Tournament.
