= Thilak Fernando =

Sri Lankan cricketer (born 1967)

Personal information
- Full name: Palamandadige Thilak Surendrasiri Fernando
- Born: 28 March 1967 (age 59); Panadura, Sri Lanka
- Source: Cricinfo, 6 April 2017

Thilak Fernando (born 28 March 1967) is a Sri Lankan former cricketer. He played 37 first-class matches between 1988 and 2004. He is now an umpire and stood in matches in the 2016–17 Districts One Day Tournament.
