= Raveen Sayer =

Sri Lankan cricketer (born 1996)

Personal information
- Full name: Raveen Sanjaya Sayer
- Born: 25 November 1996 (age 29); Kandy, Sri Lanka
- Batting: Right-handed
- Bowling: Right-arm off break
- Source: ESPNcricinfo, 22 January 2017

Raveen Sayer (born 25 November 1996) is a Sri Lankan cricketer. He made his first-class debut for Colombo Cricket Club in the 2016–17 Premier League Tournament on 20 January 2017. He made his List A debut for Colombo District in the 2016–17 Districts One Day Tournament on 22 March 2017. He made his Twenty20 debut for Galle Cricket Club in the 2017–18 SLC Twenty20 Tournament on 24 February 2018.
