= Pasindu Ushettige =

Sri Lankan cricketer (born 1999)

Personal information
- Full name: Ushettige Don Pasindu Madawa
- Born: 10 September 1999 (age 27)
- Source: Cricinfo, 6 January 2020

Pasindu Ushettige (born 10 September 1999) is a Sri Lankan cricketer. He made his List A debut on 23 December 2019, for Sri Lanka Ports Authority Cricket Club in the 2019–20 Invitation Limited Over Tournament. He made his Twenty20 debut on 6 January 2020, for Sri Lanka Ports Authority Cricket Club in the 2019–20 SLC Twenty20 Tournament.
