= Aravinda Akurugoda =

Sri Lankan cricketer (born 1996)

Personal information
- Born: 20 July 1996 (age 30); Colombo, Sri Lanka
- Source: Cricinfo, 16 March 2017

Aravinda Akurugoda (born 20 July 1996) is a Sri Lankan cricketer. He made his first-class debut for Nondescripts Cricket Club in the 2015–16 Premier League Tournament on 2 January 2016. He made his List A debut for Matara District in the 2016–17 Districts One Day Tournament on 22 March 2017. He made his Twenty20 debut for Ragama Cricket Club in the 2017–18 SLC Twenty20 Tournament on 1 March 2018.
