= Chilaw Marians Cricket Club Ground =

Cricket ground in Sri Lanka

Coordinates: 7.1657°N 79.8894°E

Ground information
- Location: Katunayake, Sri Lanka
- End names
- Free Trade Zone End; Score Board End

International information
- First WODI: 16 September 2018: Sri Lanka v India
- Last WODI: 21 March 2019: Sri Lanka v England
- First WT20I: 19 September 2018: Sri Lanka v India
- Last WT20I: 25 September 2018: Sri Lanka v India
- As of 4 September 2020; Source: Cricinfo

The Chilaw Marians Cricket Club Ground, also known as the FTZ Sports Complex, or Free Trade Zone Sports Complex, is a cricket ground in Katunayake, Sri Lanka. It has hosted both first-class and List A cricket matches in domestic cricket tournaments in Sri Lanka. In August 2018, it was named as the venue to host some of the matches between Sri Lanka women and India women for their tour in September 2018.
