= Nimesha Gunasinghe =

Sri Lankan cricketer (born 1995)

Personal information
- Full name: Sahan Nimesha Gunasinghe
- Born: 12 June 1995 (age 31); Kandy, Sri Lanka
- Source: Cricinfo, 15 March 2017

Nimesha Gunasinghe (born 12 June 1995) is a Sri Lankan cricketer. He made his first-class debut for Nondescripts Cricket Club in the 2015–16 Premier League Tournament on 4 December 2015.
