= Nuwan Priyadarshana =

Sri Lankan cricketer (born 1993)

Personal information
- Born: 9 May 1993 (age 33); Gampaha, Sri Lanka
- Source: Cricinfo, 4 January 2020

Nuwan Priyadarshana (born 9 May 1993) is a Sri Lankan cricketer. He made his Twenty20 debut on 4 January 2020, for Galle Cricket Club in the 2019–20 SLC Twenty20 Tournament. He made his List A debut on 24 November 2021, for Galle Cricket Club in the 2021–22 Major Clubs Limited Over Tournament.
