= Alankara Asanka Silva =

Sri Lankan cricketer (born 1985)

Personal information
- Full name: Alankara Asanka Sriyan Silva
- Born: 4 April 1985 (age 41); Kalutara, Sri Lanka
- Height: 5 ft 7 in (170 cm)
- Batting: Right-handed
- Bowling: Right-arm offbreak
- Role: All-rounder

Domestic team information
- Years: Team
- Badureliya Sports Club
- Colts Cricket Club
- Ragama Cricket Club
- Saracens Sports Club
- Sebastianites Club
- Sri Lanka A

Career statistics
Competition	FC	LA	T20
Matches	116	72	41
Runs scored	3,260	726	177
Batting average	21.44	17.70	11.80
100s/50s	4/15	0/1	0/0
Top score	151	57*	43
Balls bowled	16,451	2,814	776
Wickets	337	58	59
Bowling average	28.41	35.23	13.88
5 wickets in innings	19	9	0
10 wickets in match	3	0	0
Best bowling	7/73	4/27	4/13
Catches/stumpings	60/–	22/0	14/–
Medal record
Representing Sri Lanka
Men's Cricket
Asian Games
Gold medal – first place	2014 Incheon	Team
- Source: Cricinfo, 29 January 2016

Alankara Asanka Silva (born 4 April 1985) is a Sri Lankan first-class cricketer who plays for Saracens Sports Club. He holds the record for the highest individual score when batting at number 11 in a Twenty20 match (26 not out). He is a past pupil of Thissa Central College, Kalutara.
