= Avindu Theekshana =

Sri Lankan cricketer (born 1998)

Personal information
- Born: 10 October 1998 (age 28)
- Source: Cricinfo, 13 January 2019

Avindu Theekshana (born 10 October 1998) is a Sri Lankan cricketer. He made his first-class debut for Tamil Union Cricket and Athletic Club in the 2018–19 Premier League Tournament on 11 January 2019. Theekshana is a left-handed batsman and a slow left-arm orthodox bowler. He made his List A debut on 14 December 2019, for Kurunegala Youth Cricket Club in the 2019–20 Invitation Limited Over Tournament. He made his Twenty20 debut on 4 January 2020, for Kurunegala Youth Cricket Club in the 2019–20 SLC Twenty20 Tournament.
