= Surrey Village Cricket Ground =

Cricket ground in Sri Lanka

- Interactive map of Surrey Village Cricket Ground

Ground information
- Location: Surrey Village, Maggona, Kalutara District
- Country: Sri Lanka
- Coordinates: 6°30′46″N 79°59′36″E
- Establishment: 2011
- End names
- Borallacchadeniya End; Potuwila End

Team information
Badureliya Sports Club
- As of 10 December 2015; Source: Cricinfo

Surrey Village Cricket Ground in Maggona, Kalutara District, Sri Lanka, has staged first-class, List A and other cricket matches since it was opened in 2011.

== Location ==
The ground is in Surrey Village, Maggona, off St Vincent Road, about one kilometre from the sea and the Maggona railway station. Maggona is about 10 kilometres south of Kalutara.

== History ==
After the 2004 tsunami the Surrey County Cricket Club in England and the Sri Lanka Cricket Board combined to raise money to build a village for some of the Sri Lankan survivors. A Twenty20 match played by international cricketers at Surrey's home ground, The Oval, on 20 June 2005, raised about a million pounds for the project. An area in Maggona was cleared of forest, and a village, called Surrey Village, was laid out with streets named after Surrey cricketers. Then the cricket ground was constructed.

The ground was officially opened in May 2011. Since then matches in various Sri Lankan domestic men's, women's and junior competitions have been played there, as well as matches by touring clubs from overseas.

The first first-class match was played between Badureliya Sports Club, who have made this their home ground, and Moors Sports Club in February 2012. The first List A match was between Ragama Cricket Club and Sri Lanka Air Force Sports Club in December 2013.

The highest individual score at the ground is 342 by Minod Bhanuka for Sinhalese Sports Club against Badureliya Sports Club in January 2016. The best bowling figures are 9 for 86 by Lasith Embuldeniya for Nondescripts against Saracens Sports Club in March 2020.

As of early June 2025, 75 first-class matches and 72 List A matches have been played at Surrey Village.
