= Susantha Dissanayake =

Sri Lankan cricketer (born 1974)

Personal information
- Full name: D.M.Susantha Dissanayake
- Born: 7 June 1974 (age 52); Kandy, Sri Lanka
- Source: ESPNcricinfo, 5 February 2017

Susantha Dissanayake (born 7 June 1974) is a Sri Lankan cricketer. He played twelve first-class and eight List A matches between 1994 and 2000. He his now an umpire and stood in matches in the 2016–17 Premier League Tournament and the 2016–17 Districts One Day Tournament.
