= Avishka Tharindu =

Sri Lankan cricketer (born 2001)

Personal information
- Full name: Korale Kankanamge Avishka Tharindu Chandima
- Born: 13 September 2001 (age 25); Ragama, Sri Lanka

Domestic team information
- Years: Team
- 2021/22: Ragama Cricket Club
- Only List A: 30 October 2021 Ragama Cricket Club v Ace Capital Cricket Club
- Source: Cricinfo, 30 October 2021

Korale Kankanamge Avishka Tharindu Chandima (born 13 September 2001) is a Sri Lankan cricketer. Tharindu has played at under-19 level, setting several records in Sri Lankan school cricket. He made his List A debut on 30 October 2021, for Ragama Cricket Club in the 2021–22 Major Clubs Limited Over Tournament.

In April 2022, Sri Lanka Cricket (SLC) named him in the Sri Lanka Emerging Team's squad for their tour to England. The following month, in the match against Surrey, Tharindu scored his maiden century in a first-class match. On 25 May 2022, during the tour of England, he made his Twenty20 debut, also against Surrey. The following month, he was named in the Sri Lanka A squad for their matches against Australia A during Australia's tour of Sri Lanka.
