= Kavindu Nadeeshan =

Sri Lankan cricketer (born 2001)

Personal information
- Born: 31 August 2001 (age 25)
- Source: Cricinfo, 21 February 2020

Kavindu Nadeeshan (born 31 August 2001) is a Sri Lankan cricketer. He made his first-class debut on 21 February 2020, for Colombo Cricket Club in the 2019–20 Premier League Tournament. Prior to his first-class debut, he was named in Sri Lanka's squad for the 2020 Under-19 Cricket World Cup. In October 2020, he was drafted by the Dambulla Viiking for the inaugural edition of the Lanka Premier League. He made his Twenty20 debut on 11 December 2020, for the Dambulla Viiking in the 2020 Lanka Premier League. In March 2021, he was part of the Sinhalese Sports Club team that won the 2020–21 SLC Twenty20 Tournament, the first time they had won the tournament since 2005. He made his List A debut on 27 October 2021, for Sinhalese Sports Club in the 2021–22 Major Clubs Limited Over Tournament.
