= Yashodha Lanka =

Sri Lankan cricketer (born 1992)

Personal information
- Full name: Aputhanthri Kankanamge Kushan Yashodha Lanka
- Born: 1 October 1992 (age 34); Galle, Sri Lanka
- Batting: Right-handed
- Bowling: Left-arm medium fast
- Role: Batter
- Source: ESPNcricinfo, 28 January 2017

Yashodha Lanka (born 1 October 1992) is a Sri Lankan cricketer. He made his first-class debut for Badureliya Sports Club in the 2010–11 Premier Trophy on 4 April 2011.
