= Shasheen Fernando =

Sri Lankan cricketer (born 1994)

Personal information
- Full name: Palamandadige Shasheen Wishmaal Fernando
- Born: 1 January 1994 (age 32); Wellawatte, Sri Lanka
- Source: Cricinfo, 9 April 2017

Shasheen Fernando (born 1 January 1994) is a Sri Lankan cricketer. He made his first-class debut for Panadura Sports Club in the 2013–14 Premier Trophy on 17 January 2014.

== See also ==
- List of Chilaw Marians Cricket Club players
