= Jeewaka Shashen =

Sri Lankan cricketer (born 2003)

Personal information
- Born: 27 October 2003 (age 23)

Domestic team information
- Years: Team
- 2021/22: Negombo Cricket Club
- Source: Cricinfo, 23 November 2021

Jeewaka Shashen (born 27 October 2003) is a Sri Lankan cricketer. He has played for the Sri Lanka national under-19 cricket team, and made his List A debut on 23 November 2021, for Negombo Cricket Club in the 2020–21 Major Clubs Limited Over Tournament.
