= School cricket in Sri Lanka =

Cricket was introduced in Sri Lanka during the 19th century by the British. A Sri Lankan school was the first to play cricket in 1864, primarily against small clubs. With the arrival of English cricketer Ashley Walker and the founding of Royal College, Colombo, Sri Lanka's first inter-school match took place between S. Thomas' College, Mount Lavinia and Royal College in 1880. An annual match, known as the Battle of the Blues, was held.

The sport became popular in British Empire colonies, including Ceylon (present-day Sri Lanka). S. Thomas' College, Mount Lavinia and Royal College, Colombo began to play cricket, and large schools in Kandy, Galle, Matara, and Jaffna have included cricket in their sports programs; it gradually became Sri Lanka's most popular sport. The Sri Lankan government recognized cricket as a national sport and enacted infrastructure projects for it. Schools were financially encouraged to offer cricket programs, helping to provide national teams to represent Sri Lanka at the international level.

== Governance ==
=== Sri Lanka Cricket ===
Sri Lanka Cricket (SLC), formerly known as the Board of Control for Cricket in Sri Lanka (BCCSL), is the sport's national governing body. With the expansion of school cricket in Sri Lanka, it became necessary for SLC to work with a separate association in activities relevant to school cricket.

=== Sri Lanka Schools Cricket Association ===
A group of school principals devised the idea for the Sri Lanka Schools Cricket Association (SLSCA) in 1930. Wesley College, Colombo principal Rev. James Cartman helped form the association in 1948, and was its first president. The SLSCA organizes island-wide, interscholastic tournaments and appoints officers at the scholastic level, providing a platform for players and teams to gain recognition by hosting age-group (U13 to U19) tournaments.

== SLSCA interscholastic tournaments ==
The SLSCA conducts tournaments in accordance with the Laws of Cricket and the International Cricket Council (ICC). Its tournament committee has full authority on all matters relating to games. All SLSCA-affiliated schools are eligible to participate in association tournaments.

== School and tournament categories ==
School Cricket is divided by age into four leagues: U13 (under 13 years old), U15 (13 to 15-year-olds), U17 (15 to 17-year-olds), and U19 (17 to 19-year-olds). According to a team's ranking in its age group, each league has three divisions: I, II, and III. Tournaments are held annually on a fixed schedule, and usually last for several months.

=== U19 ===
U19 divisions I and II begin their tournaments in September, continuing until the end of February. Division III plays two-day league matches from September to the end of January.

=== U17 and U15 ===
U17 and U15 tournaments begin around May (after the U19 season), and continue until August.

=== U13 ===
U13 tournaments begin around September, after the U17 and U15 seasons.

== Promotion and demotion ==
=== U19 ===
The top two Division II teams, with the highest average points at the main tournament, are promoted to Division I. The Division III champion and runner-up, decided by a knock-out tournament, are eligible for Division II. Tournaments are held in Divisions I and II for the three schools in each division with the lowest average points in two-day tournaments. The two schools with the lowest average points are demoted one division (Division I schools to Division II, and Division II schools to Division III).

=== U17 and 15 ===
The two teams from Divisions I and II which rank last in the points table are demoted to Divisions II and III, respectively, and the two top teams in Divisions II and III are promoted to Divisions I and II.

== Participation ==
- Under 19: In 2013-14, there were 37 schools in Division I, 29 in Division II, and 142 in Division III.
- Under 17: In 2013-14, there were 77 schools in Division I, 32 in Division II, and 150 in Division III.
- Under 15: There are 80 schools in Division I, 73 in Division II, and 432 in Division III.

== Under 19 championships ==
The most prestigious U19 tournament is the one-day provincial tournament, with major teams from Kandy, Colombo, and Dambulla. Galle has a two-day league tournament with group matches in all three divisions. The two teams which top the points table in Divisions I and II are declared champions, and a Division III champion is not selected.

Thirty Division I, 14 Division II, and four Division III teams play a two-day limited overs tournament. The 48 teams play 12 first-round group matches (12 groups), and the 12 group leaders and four best runners-up play knock-out matches in the final round for the championship. In addition to this tournament, a knock-out game is played by teams completing five matches in the Division III two-day tournament to select the champion of that division.
