= Avishka Perera =

Sri Lankan cricketer (born 2001)

Personal information
- Born: 26 April 2001 (age 25)
- Source: Cricinfo, 10 March 2021

Avishka Perera (born 26 April 2001) is a Sri Lankan cricketer. He made his Twenty20 debut on 10 March 2021, for Colts Cricket Club in the 2020–21 SLC Twenty20 Tournament. He made his List A debut on 30 March 2021, for Colts Cricket Club in the 2020–21 Major Clubs Limited Over Tournament. In April 2022, Sri Lanka Cricket (SLC) named him in the Sri Lanka Emerging Team's squad for their tour to England. In July 2022, he was signed by the Kandy Falcons for the third edition of the Lanka Premier League.

Avishka is educated at Nalanda College, Colombo and captained the college first XI cricket team in 2020.
