= Nalin Priyadarshana =

Sri Lankan cricketer (born 1990)

Personal information
- Born: 28 August 1990 (age 36); Padukka, Sri Lanka
- Batting: Right-handed
- Bowling: Right-arm off spin
- Source: ESPNcricinfo, 23 December 2016

Nalin Priyadarshana (born 28 August 1990) is a Sri Lankan cricketer. He made his first-class debut for Colombo Cricket Club in the 2015–16 Premier League Tournament on 4 December 2015.

He made his Twenty20 debut for Sri Lanka Ports Authority Cricket Club in the 2017–18 SLC Twenty20 Tournament on 1 March 2018, taking a hat-trick. He made his List A debut for Sri Lanka Ports Authority Cricket Club in the 2017–18 Premier Limited Overs Tournament on 18 March 2018.

In November 2021, he was selected to play for the Colombo Stars following the players' draft for the 2021 Lanka Premier League.
