= Malindu Shehan =

Sri Lankan cricketer (born 1994)

Personal information
- Born: 19 May 1994 (age 32)
- Source: Cricinfo, 17 December 2019

Malindu Shehan (born 19 May 1994) is a Sri Lankan cricketer. He made his List A debut on 17 December 2019, for Burgher Recreation Club in the 2019–20 Invitation Limited Over Tournament. He made his Twenty20 debut on 10 January 2020, for Burgher Recreation Club in the 2019–20 SLC Twenty20 Tournament. He made his first-class debut on 22 February 2020, for Burgher Recreation Club in the 2019–20 Premier League Tournament, scoring a century in the first innings.
