= Badureliya Sports Club =

Badureliya Cricket Club
Personnel
- Captain: (Sri Lanka) Alankara Asanka Silva
- Coach: (Sri Lanka) Thamara Abeyratne

Team information
- Colours: Pale blue
- Home ground: Surrey Village Cricket Ground, Maggona

History
- Premier Trophy wins: none
- Premier Limited Overs Tournament wins: none
- Twenty20 Tournament wins: 1

Badureliya Sports Club is a first-class cricket team in Sri Lanka. It plays its home matches at Surrey Village Cricket Ground, Maggona, Kalutara District.

In late 2008, the club threatened to boycott the Sri Lankan domestic tournaments due to their objections to being relegated to Tier B from their position in Tier A. The club later backed down from their stance, and defeated Nondescripts Cricket Club by an innings and two runs.

From 2005–2006, when they first appeared in first-class cricket, till late December 2015, Badureliya Sports Club played 97 first-class matches, for 13 wins, 37 losses and 47 draws.

Badureliya Sports Club won the Sri Lanka Cricket Twenty-20 Tournament in 2014–15.

== Current squad ==
These players featured in matches for Badureliya SC in the 2019/20 season.

Players with international caps are listed in bold.

N	Name	Nat	Age	Batting Style	Bowling Style
Batsmen
–	Kosala Ravindu	(Sri Lanka)	25	Right-handed	Right-arm off-break
7	Yashodha Lanka	(Sri Lanka)	33	Right-handed	Left-arm medium-fast
–	Salinda Ushan	(Sri Lanka)	28	Left-handed	Right-arm off-break
All-Rounders
–	Dushan Hemantha	(Sri Lanka)	31	Right-handed	Right arm leg-break
–	Tillakaratne Sampath	(Sri Lanka)	43	Right-handed	Right-arm off-break
Wicket-keepers
4	Lahiru Milantha	(Sri Lanka)	31	Left-handed	–
–	Damith Perera	(Sri Lanka)	28	Left-handed	–
Pace Bowlers
20	**Shehan Madushanka**	(Sri Lanka)	30	Right-handed	Right-arm fast-medium
73	Lahiru Samarakoon	(Sri Lanka)	28	Left-handed	Right-arm medium-fast
–	Sahan Jayawardene	(Sri Lanka)	35	Left-handed	Left-arm medium-fast
–	Buddika Sanjeewa	(Sri Lanka)	38	Right-handed	Left-arm medium-fast
Spin Bowlers
–	Alankara Asanka Silva (Captain)	(Sri Lanka)	40	Right-handed	Right-arm off-break
