= Katunayake =

Katunayake කටුනායක கட்டுநாயக்கா
- town
- Location within Sri Lanka
- Coordinates: 7°10′N 79°52′E
- Province: Western Province
- Time zone: UTC+05:30 (SLST)

Katunayake (Sinhala: කටුනායක, Tamil: கட்டுநாயக்கா), is a suburb of Negombo in Western Province, Sri Lanka. It is the site of Bandaranaike International Airport, the primary international air gateway to Sri Lanka. With the change of government in 1977 and the introduction of the open economy policy, a large area was allocated to create a free trade zone (currently known as the Export Promotion Zone).

== Government and infrastructure ==
Civil Aviation Authority of Sri Lanka has its head office in Katunayake.

SriLankan Airlines is headquartered on the grounds of the airport in Katunayake.

The Royal Air Force operated an air base at Katunayake from 1947, until it was transferred to the Sri Lankan government on 1 November 1957. Prime Minister Sirimavo Bandaranaike declared the transfer of this air base as the date Sri Lankan independence was completed.

== Economy ==
In 1978, a free-trade zone (FTZ) was established in Katunayake, this was the first FTZ established in Sri Lanka. It is the largest FTZ in Sri Lanka. There are 90 multinational industries in the Katunayake FTZ. In 2019, the area had 22,300 female workers in 92 factories and an additional 40,000 female workers in factories near its FTZ.

On 30 May 2011 the police attacked workers at the Katunayake FTZ, protesting against a proposed new pension plan, resulting in the death of one of the protesters and over 200 injuries. The police actions led to the Inspector General of Police, Mahinda Balasuriya, resigning his position.

== Transport ==
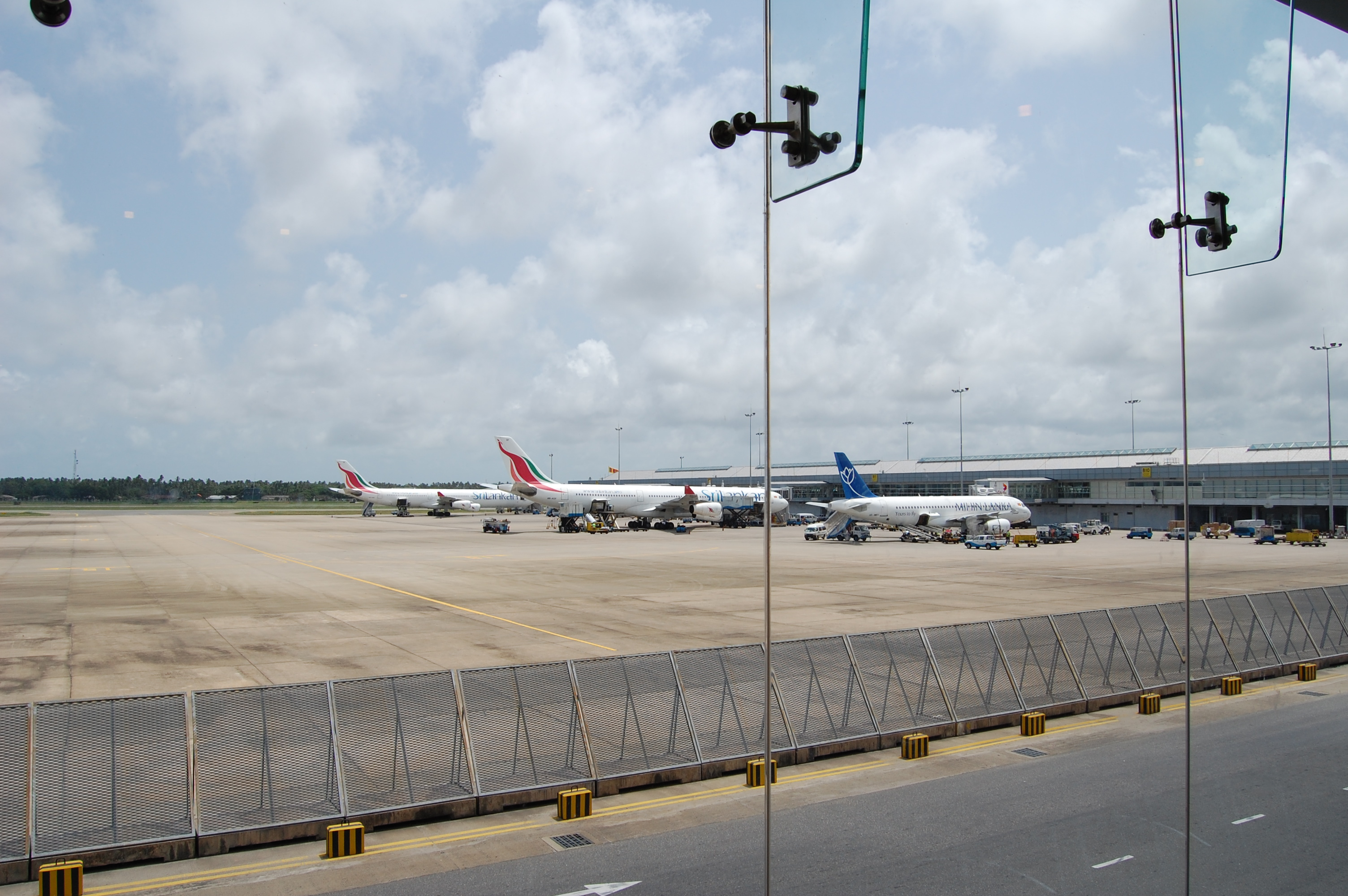
Bandaranaike International Airport at Katunayake

The Bandaranaike International Airport is the only international airport in Sri Lanka.

Negombo is at the northern end of the Colombo-Katunayake Expressway which connects Colombo and the A1 highway at Peliyagoda.

== Works cited ==
=== Books ===
- Hewamanne, Sandya (2020). Restitching Identities in Rural Sri Lanka: Gender, Neoliberalism, and the Politics of Contentment. University of Pennsylvania Press. ISBN 9780812297331.
- Mines, Diane; Lamb, Sarah, eds. (2010). Everyday Life in South Asia, Second Edition (2 ed.). Indiana University Press. ISBN 9780253013576.

=== Journals ===
- Kodikara, S. (1973). "Major Trends in Sri Lanka's Non-Alignment Policy after 1956". Asian Survey. 13 (12). University of California Press: 1121–1136. doi:10.2307/2642672. JSTOR 2642672.
