= 2018–19 Premier Limited Overs Tournament =

Cricket tournament

- Dates: 4 – 19 March 2019
- Administrator: Sri Lanka Cricket
- Cricket format: List A cricket
- Tournament format: Round-robin then knockout
- Host: Sri Lanka
- Champions: Sinhalese Sports Club (9th title)
- Participants: 24
- Most runs: Sachithra Senanayake (445)
- Most wickets: Nishan Peiris (20)

The 2018–19 Premier Limited Overs Tournament was a List A cricket competition that took place in Sri Lanka. It was the eighteenth edition of the Premier Limited Overs Tournament. The tournament ran from 4 to 19 March 2019. Sinhalese Sports Club were the defending champions.

Following the conclusion of the group stage matches, Colombo Cricket Club, Moors Sports Club, Nondescripts Cricket Club, Panadura Sports Club, Ragama Cricket Club, Saracens Sports Club, Sinhalese Sports Club and Sri Lanka Army Sports Club had all progressed to the quarterfinals. Colombo Cricket Club, Moors Sports Club, Saracens Sports Club and Sinhalese Sports Club all won their quarterfinal matches.

In the first semi-final, Sinhalese Sports Club beat Saracens Sports Club by 36 runs, via the Duckworth–Lewis method to advance to the final. They were joined in the final by Colombo Cricket Club, after they beat Moors Sports Club by five wickets. Sinhalese Sports Club retained their title by beating Colombo Cricket Club by seven wickets in the final.

== Fixtures ==
=== Group A ===
4 March 2019
Scorecard

Sinhalese Sports Club; 78 (33.5 overs)	v	Kurunegala Youth Cricket Club; 79/2 (11.3 overs)
Shalika Karunanayake 16 (50); Sachithra Senanayake 4/9 (7.5 overs)		Kaushal Silva 39* (41); Shalika Karunanayake 1/12 (2 overs)

Sinhalese won by 8 wickets
Sri Lanka Army Ordnance Corps International Cricket Stadium, Horana
Umpires: Ravindra Kottahachchi and Chaminda Hathurusingha

- Sinhalese Sports Club won the toss and elected to field.
- Rasanjana Jayaratne and Randeera Ranasinghe (Kurunegala Youth Cricket Club) both made their List A debuts.

4 March 2019
Scorecard

Moors Sports Club; 319/7 (50 overs)	v	Sri Lanka Navy Sports Club; 307/9 (50 overs)
Ayana Siriwardhana 105* (50); Dilan Chandima 2/35 (2 overs)		Dushan Hemantha 87 (83); Adeesha Thilanchana 2/38 (6 overs)

Moors Sports Club won by 12 runs
Navy Ground, Welisara
Umpires: Gamini Dissanayake and Nilantha Semasinghe

- Moors Sports Club won the toss and elected to bat.
- Revan Kelly, Salitha Fernando, Savindu Peiris (Sri Lanka Navy Sports Club) and Ayana Siriwardhana (Moors Sports Club) all made their List A debuts.

5 March 2019
Scorecard

Sri Lanka Ports Authority Cricket Club; 209/9 (50 overs)	v	Tamil Union Cricket and Athletic Club; 212/3 (35.4 overs)
Adeesha Nanayakkara 58 (90); Binura Fernando 2/19 (8 overs)		Sachithra Serasinghe 80 (84); Hashan Vimarshana 3/50 (9 overs)

Tamil Union Cricket and Athletic Club won by 7 wickets
Nondescripts Cricket Club Ground, Colombo
Umpires: Vidura Prasad and Deepal Gunawardene

- Tamil Union Cricket and Athletic Club won the toss and elected to field.
- Damitha Silva (Tamil Union Cricket and Athletic Club) made his List A debut.

6 March 2019
Scorecard

Sri Lanka Navy Sports Club; 292/9 (50 overs)	v	Kurunegala Youth Cricket Club; 229 (45.5 overs)
Tharushan Iddamalgoda 127 (118); Anurudda Rajapakse 3/52 (9 overs)		Dinushka Malan 61 (59); Dilanka Auwardt 3/39 (9 overs)

Sri Lanka Navy Sports Club won by 63 runs
Welagedara Stadium, Kurunegala
Umpires: Upul Wewage and Keerthi Bandara

- Kurunegala Youth Cricket Club won the toss and elected to field.
- Keshan Wanniarachchi (Kurunegala Youth Cricket Club) made his List A debut.

6 March 2019
Scorecard

Sinhalese Sports Club; 364/8 (50 overs)	v	Sri Lanka Ports Authority Cricket Club; 282/7 (50 overs)
Sachithra Senanayake 150 (121); Chaminda Bandara 4/67 (10 overs)		Gayan Maneeshan 97 (96); Sachithra Senanayake 2/43 (10 overs)

Sinhalese won by 82 runs
Sri Lanka Army Ordnance Corps International Cricket Stadium, Horana
Umpires: Gamini Dissanayake and Kitsiri Jayaweera

- Sri Lanka Ports Authority Cricket Club won the toss and elected to field.
- Poorna de Silva (Sri Lanka Ports Authority Cricket Club) and Asel Kulathunga (Sinhalese Sports Club) both made their List A debuts.

7 March 2019
Scorecard

Tamil Union Cricket and Athletic Club; 213 (45 overs)	v	Moors Sports Club; 214/4 (35.5 overs)
Lahiru Milantha 66 (66); Ramesh Mendis 4/22 (10 overs)		Irosh Samarasooriya 76 (92); Jeevan Mendis 2/43 (7.5 overs)

Moors Sports Club won by 6 wickets
P Sara Oval, Colombo
Umpires: Asanga Jayasooriya and Pradeep Udawatta

- Moors Sports Club won the toss and elected to field.

8 March 2019
Scorecard

Tamil Union Cricket and Athletic Club; 324/6 (50 overs)	v	Sri Lanka Navy Sports Club; 181 (42.3 overs)
Sachithra Serasinghe 130* (103); Buddika Madushan 2/48 (10 overs)		Asiri de Silva 34 (38); Damitha Silva 4/33 (10 overs)

Tamil Union Cricket and Athletic Club won by 161 runs
Navy Ground, Welisara
Umpires: Shantha Fonseka and Nilan De Silva

- Sri Lanka Navy Sports Club won the toss and elected to field.
- Shewon Fonseka (Sri Lanka Navy Sports Club) made his List A debut.

8 March 2019
Scorecard

Sri Lanka Ports Authority Cricket Club; 270/7 (50 overs)	v	Kurunegala Youth Cricket Club; 255 (44 overs)
Adeesha Nanayakkara 113 (101); Dinushka Malan 3/46 (10 overs)		Dhanushka Dharmasiri 132 (127); Ranesh Perera 3/43 (10 overs)

Sri Lanka Ports Authority Cricket Club won by 15 runs
Colombo Cricket Club Ground, Colombo
Umpires: Krishantha Rodrigo and Pradeep Udawatta

- Sri Lanka Ports Authority Cricket Club won the toss and elected to bat.
- Yohan Chanuka, Sehan Nissanka (Sri Lanka Ports Authority Cricket Club) and Sanjeewan Priyadharshana (Kurunegala Youth Cricket Club) all made their List A debuts.

8 March 2019
Scorecard

Moors Sports Club; 253 (49.3 overs)	v	Sinhalese Sports Club; 257/3 (46.2 overs)
Pabasara Waduge 73 (90); Dhammika Prasad 3/43 (10 overs)		Danushka Gunathilaka 100 (144); Keshan Wijerathne 1/35 (5 overs)

Sinhalese won by 7 wickets
Moors Sports Club Ground, Colombo
Umpires: Ranganath Prasanna and Deepal Gunawardene

- Sinhalese Sports Club won the toss and elected to field.

10 March 2019
Scorecard

Sri Lanka Ports Authority Cricket Club; 209 (49.5 overs)	v	Moors Sports Club; 213/5 (33.4 overs)
Yohan de Silva 54 (78); Malith de Silva 3/32 (10 overs)		Pabasara Waduge 86 (79); Imesh Udayanga 3/52 (10 overs)

Moors Sports Club won by 5 wickets
Moors Sports Club Ground, Colombo
Umpires: Kamal Indrajith and Rohitha Kottahachchi

- Sri Lanka Ports Authority Cricket Club won the toss and elected to bat.
- Lahiru Attanayake (Moors Sports Club) made his List A debut.

10 March 2019
Scorecard

Sri Lanka Navy Sports Club; 175 (46.1 overs)	v	Sinhalese Sports Club; 207/8 (49.3 overs)
Tharushan Iddamalgoda 73 (77); Sachithra Senanayake 3/40 (10 overs)		Chamara Kapugedera 58 (90); Dushan Hemantha 3/42 (10 overs)

Sinhalese Sports Club won by 2 wickets
Navy Ground, Welisara
Umpires: Chamara de Soysa and Pradeep Udawatta

- Sinhalese Sports Club won the toss and elected to field.
- Thilan Prashan (Sinhalese Sports Club), W Mayantha and Charuka Wijelath (Sri Lanka Navy Sports Club) all made their List A debuts.

10 March 2019
Scorecard

Kurunegala Youth Cricket Club; 203/8 (50 overs)	v	Tamil Union Cricket and Athletic Club; 203 (47 overs)
Dinushka Malan 60* (76); Binura Fernando 3/43 (10 overs)		Binura Fernando 61 (60); Dinushka Malan 4/34 (9 overs)

Kurunegala Youth Cricket Club won by 9 runs
Welagedara Stadium, Kurunegala
Umpires: Susantha Dissanayake and Prageeth Rambukwella

- Kurunegala Youth Cricket Club won the toss and elected to bat.
- Dulaj Ranatunga (Kurunegala Youth Cricket Club) made his List A debut.

12 March 2019
Scorecard

Kurunegala Youth Cricket Club; 205/9 (50 overs)	v	Moors Sports Club; 204 (41.2 overs)
Dulaj Ranatunga 81 (114); Malith de Silva 3/41 (8 overs)		Chamara Silva 56 (64); Dinushka Malan 2/24 (5 overs)

Kurunegala Youth Cricket Club won by 1 run
Moors Sports Club Ground, Colombo
Umpires: Chaturan Sanjeewa and Pradeep Udawatta

- Kurunegala Youth Cricket Club won the toss and elected to bat.

12 March 2019
Scorecard

Tamil Union Cricket and Athletic Club; 234 (46 overs)	v	Sinhalese Sports Club; 235/9 (49.4 overs)
Jeevan Mendis 50 (35); Shammu Ashan 4/63 (9 overs)		Sachithra Senanayake 39 (42); Damitha Silva 2/18 (10 overs)

Sinhalese Sports Club won by 1 wicket
Nondescripts Cricket Club Ground, Colombo
Umpires: Chamara de Soysa and Lyndon Hannibal

- Sinhalese Sports Club won the toss and elected to field.
- Krishan Sanjula (Sinhalese Sports Club), Yohan Mendis and Thilanga Udeshana (Tamil Union Cricket and Athletic Club) all made their List A debuts.

12 March 2019
Scorecard

Sri Lanka Navy Sports Club; 259/7 (50 overs)	v	Sri Lanka Ports Authority Cricket Club; 216 (43.5 overs)
Dilan Chandima 65 (104); Adeesha Nanayakkara 2/32 (4 overs)		Gayan Maneeshan 92 (96); Dilan Chandima 4/42 (8.5 overs)

Sri Lanka Navy Sports Club won by 43 runs
Navy Ground, Welisara
Umpires: Chaminda Hathurusingha and Keerthi Bandara

- Sri Lanka Navy Sports Club won the toss and elected to bat.
- Hasindu Vidarshana (Sri Lanka Ports Authority Cricket Club) made his List A debut.

=== Group B ===
4 March 2019
Scorecard

Galle Cricket Club; 82 (25.2 overs)	v	Nondescripts Cricket Club; 86/1 (17.4 overs)
Akalanka Ganegama 23 (32); Asitha Fernando 5/32 (6.2 overs)		Hasitha Boyagoda 42* (58); Gayan Sirisoma 1/26 (7.4 overs)

Nondescripts won by 9 wickets
Nondescripts Cricket Club Ground, Colombo
Umpires: Susantha Dissanayake and Nilan De Silva

- Nondescripts Cricket Club won the toss and elected to field.
- Sachindu Colombage (Nondescripts Cricket Club), Avishka Chenuka, Avindu Fernando, Kevin Koththigoda and A Warnakulasuriya (Galle Cricket Club) all made their List A debuts.

4 March 2019
Scorecard

Police Sports Club; 188 (44 overs)	v	Burgher Recreation Club; 189/7 (36.1 overs)
Gitansh Khera 42 (54); Mohamed Shiraz 5/40 (9 overs)		Deshan Dias 74 (89); Manjula Jayawardene 3/30 (9 overs)

Burgher Recreation Club won by 3 wickets
Burgher Recreation Club Ground, Colombo
Umpires: Hemantha Boteju and Ranganath Prasanna

- Burgher Recreation Club won the toss and elected to field.
- The match was reduced to 45 overs per side due to rain.
- Chameera Dissanayake (Burgher Recreation Club) and Sujan Mayura (Police Sports Club) both made their List A debuts.

4 March 2019
Scorecard

Bloomfield Cricket and Athletic Club; 270/7 (50 overs)	v	Panadura Sports Club; 275/7 (47.5 overs)
Sanoj Darshika 67 (66); Navin Kavikara 2/39 (9 overs)		Asantha Basnayake 58 (85); Sanoj Darshika 3/42 (8.5 overs)

Panadura Sports Club won by 3 wickets
Bloomfield Cricket and Athletic Club Ground, Colombo
Umpires: Sisira Kumara Perera and Pradeep Udawatta

- Bloomfield Cricket and Athletic Club won the toss and elected to bat.
- Kasun Abeyrathne, Sanoj Darshika, Geeshat Panditharatne, Asel Sigera, Andrew Parys, Tharindu Karunaratne (Bloomfield Cricket and Athletic Club), Charana Nanayakkara, Tharusha Fernando and Asantha Basnayake (Panadura Sports Club) all made their List A debuts.

6 March 2019
Scorecard

Nondescripts Cricket Club; 340/9 (50 overs)	v	Police Sports Club; 174 (42.1 overs)
Lahiru Udara 110 (90); Dinuka Hettiarachchi 4/53 (10 overs)		Gitansh Khera 74 (88); Asitha Fernando 5/33 (8 overs)

Nondescripts Cricket Club won by 166 runs
Nondescripts Cricket Club Ground, Colombo
Umpires: Kamal Indrajith and Ravindra Kottahachchi

- Nondescripts Cricket Club won the toss and elected to bat.
- Ramesh Madushanka (Police Sports Club) made his List A debut.

6 March 2019
Scorecard

Panadura Sports Club; 195/9 (45 overs)	v	Burgher Recreation Club; 133 (36.4 overs)
Asantha Basnayake 36 (53); Mohamed Shiraz 3/55 (8 overs)		Raminda Wijesooriya 38 (39); Sehan Weerasinghe 4/34 (9 overs)

Panadura Sports Club won by 62 runs
Burgher Recreation Club Ground, Colombo
Umpires: Deepal Gunawardene and Niroshana Amarasinghe

- Burgher Recreation Club won the toss and elected to field.

6 March 2019
Scorecard

Bloomfield Cricket and Athletic Club; 139 (36.2 overs)	v	Galle Cricket Club; 142/3 (32.5 overs)
Asel Sigera 35 (49); Rajeewa Weerasinghe 3/25 (8 overs)		Damitha Hunukumbura 54* (90); Aravinda Premaratne 1/18 (6 overs)

Galle Cricket Club won by 7 wickets
Galle International Stadium, Galle
Umpires: Rohitha Kottahachchi

- Galle Cricket Club won the toss and elected to field.

8 March 2019
Scorecard

Nondescripts Cricket Club; 271 (50 overs)	v	Panadura Sports Club; 164 (39.5 overs)
Pathum Nissanka 76 (82); Vinodh Perera 5/41 (10 overs)		Vishva Chathuranga 63 (68); Sachindu Colombage 5/31 (7 overs)

Nondescripts Cricket Club won by 107 runs
Nondescripts Cricket Club Ground, Colombo
Umpires: Asanga Jayasooriya and Ranjith Vishwakula

- Nondescripts Cricket Club won the toss and elected to bat.
- C Perera (Panadura Sports Club) made his List A debut.

8 March 2019
Scorecard

Burgher Recreation Club; 298/8 (50 overs)	v	Bloomfield Cricket and Athletic Club; 137 (38.1 overs)
Deshan Dias 72 (113); Madushan Ravichandrakumar 4/77 (10 overs)		Sachin Jayawardena 66 (79); Rumesh Buddika 3/32 (5 overs)

Burgher Recreation Club won by 161 runs
Panadura Esplanade, Panadura
Umpires: Kamal Indrajith and Chaminda Hathurusingha

- Bloomfield Cricket and Athletic Club won the toss and elected to field.
- Kasun Ekanayake, Chathuranga Dikkumbura and Nipun Haggalla (Bloomfield Cricket and Athletic Club) all made their List A debuts.

8 March 2019
Scorecard

Police Sports Club; 180 (48.4 overs)	v	Galle Cricket Club; 186/6 (38.5 overs)
Gitansh Khera 91* (110); Rajith Priyan 4/40 (10 overs)		Nisal Randika 62 (81); Supun Madushanka 4/40 (7 overs)

Galle Cricket Club won by 4 wickets
Police Park Ground, Colombo
Umpires: Maurice Dela Zilva and Susantha Dissanayake

- Police Sports Club won the toss and elected to bat.
- Paven Rathnayake and Supun Madushanka (Police Sports Club) both made their List A debuts.

10 March 2019
Scorecard

Bloomfield Cricket and Athletic Club; 335/3 (50 overs)	v	Nondescripts Cricket Club; 243 (45.1 overs)
Dinesh Chandimal 113* (110); Asel Sigera 1/55 (10 overs)		Geeshat Panditharatne 58 (96); Asitha Fernando 3/43 (7 overs)

Nondescripts Cricket Club won by 92 runs
Bloomfield Cricket and Athletic Club Ground, Colombo
Umpires: Ranganath Prasanna and Raveendra Wimalasiri

- Nondescripts Cricket Club won the toss and elected to bat.
- Dileepa Jayalath (Bloomfield Cricket and Athletic Club) and Kasun Caldera (Nondescripts Cricket Club) both made their List A debuts.

10 March 2019
Scorecard

Burgher Recreation Club; 321/4 (45 overs)	v	Galle Cricket Club; 271 (42.2 overs)
Bhanuka Rajapaksa 105* (49); Kevin Koththigoda 2/59 (9 overs)		Ashan Madushanka 43 (54); Mohamed Shiraz 3/64 (7.2 overs)

Burgher Recreation Club won by 50 runs
Galle International Stadium, Galle
Umpires: Krishantha Rodrigo and Asanga Jayasooriya

- Burgher Recreation Club won the toss and elected to bat.
- Bawantha Udangamuwa and Ashan Madushanka (Galle Cricket Club) both made their List A debuts.

10 March 2019
Scorecard

Panadura Sports Club; 246/9 (50 overs)	v	Police Sports Club; 250/5 (48 overs)
Vishva Chathuranga 79 (74); Supun Madushanka 2/34 (5 overs)		Gitansh Khera 111* (99); Tharusha Fernando 2/42 (7 overs)

Police Sports Club won by 5 wickets
Police Park Ground, Colombo
Umpires: Vidura Prasad and Nilan De Silva

- Police Sports Club won the toss and elected to field.
- Nipuna Deshan (Panadura Sports Club) made his List A debut.

12 March 2019
Scorecard

Nondescripts Cricket Club; 252 (49.1 overs)	v	Burgher Recreation Club; 158 (29.4 overs)
Mahela Udawatte 106 (94); Maduka Liyanapathiranage 3/63 (10 overs)		Raminda Wijesooriya 37 (30); Sachindu Colombage 2/15 (4 overs)

Nondescripts Cricket Club won by 94 runs
Burgher Recreation Club Ground, Colombo
Umpires: Maurice Dela Zilva and Prageeth Rambukwella

- Burgher Recreation Club won the toss and elected to field.

12 March 2019
Scorecard

Bloomfield Cricket and Athletic Club; 263 (50 overs)	v	Police Sports Club; 264/3 (43.5 overs)
Madushan Ravichandrakumar 80 (67); Gayantha Wijethilake 3/60 (9 overs)		Amit Kumar 123* (110); Chathura Obeyesekere 1/28 (6 overs)

Police Sports Club won by 7 wickets
Bloomfield Cricket and Athletic Club Ground, Colombo
Umpires: Kamal Indrajith and Ravindra Kottahachchi

- Bloomfield Cricket and Athletic Club won the toss and elected to bat.
- Chathura Obeyesekere (Bloomfield Cricket and Athletic Club) and Tamara Weerasuriya (Police Sports Club) both made their List A debuts.

12 March 2019
Scorecard

Panadura Sports Club; 224 (48.3 overs)	v	Galle Cricket Club; 174 (44.4 overs)
Vishva Chathuranga 98 (63); Rajeewa Weerasinghe 3/37 (10 overs)		Nisal Randika 58 (96); Navin Kavikara 4/21 (9.4 overs)

Panadura Sports Club won by 50 runs
Panadura Esplanade, Panadura
Umpires: Kapil Kottahachchi and Susantha Dissanayake

- Galle Cricket Club won the toss and elected to field.
- Amitha Kaushalya (Panadura Sports Club) made his List A debut.

=== Group C ===
4 March 2019
Scorecard

Colombo Cricket Club; 234 (49.3 overs)	v	Kalutara Town Club; 226/9 (50 overs)
Madawa Warnapura 60 (60); Eranga Rathnayake 4/27 (10 overs)		Eranga Rathnayake 73 (67); Wanindu Hasaranga 4/64 (10 overs)

Colombo Cricket Club won by 8 runs
Colombo Cricket Club Ground, Colombo
Umpires: Maurice Zilva and Kapil Kottahachchi

- Kalutara Town Club won the toss and elected to field.
- V Amugoda (Kalutara Town Club) made his List A debut.

4 March 2019
Scorecard

Saracens Sports Club; 181 (47 overs)	v	Lankan Cricket Club; 156 (48.2 overs)
Milinda Siriwardana 59 (60); Chanaka Devinda 4/26 (9 overs)		Shifran Muthaliph 39 (55); Andy Solomons 3/24 (6.2 overs)

Saracens Sports Club won by 25 runs
Surrey Village, Maggona
Umpires: Rohitha Kottahachchi and Asanga Jayasooriya

- Lankan Cricket Club won the toss and elected to field.
- Sawan Kankanamge, Shifran Muthaliph, Ayantha de Silva, Chathura Somathillake and T Rodrigo (Lankan Cricket Club) all made their List A debuts.

4 March 2019
Scorecard

Colts Cricket Club; 220 (47.3 overs)	v	Badureliya Sports Club; 224/7 (43 overs)
Vishad Randika 65 (85); Sachith Pathirana 5/37 (10 overs)		Kosala Kulasekara 74* (77); Jehan Daniel 3/43 (9 overs)

Badureliya Sports Club won by 3 wickets
Colts Cricket Club Ground, Colombo
Umpires: Raveendra Wimalasiri and Upul Wewage

- Badureliya Sports Club won the toss and elected to field.
- Nipun Ransika (Colts Cricket Club) made his List A debut.

6 March 2019
Scorecard

Saracens Sports Club; 278/8 (50 overs)	v	Badureliya Sports Club; 149 (37.5 overs)
Gamindu Kanishka 94 (114); Nuwan Thushara 3/52 (10 overs)		Lahiru Samarakoon 40 (37); Ashen Bandara 4/17 (4 overs)

Saracens Sports Club won by 129 runs
Surrey Village, Maggona
Umpires: Chaturan Sanjeewa and Lyndon Hannibal

- Badureliya Sports Club won the toss and elected to field.

6 March 2019
Scorecard

Kalutara Town Club; 280/7 (45 overs)	v	Colts Cricket Club; 207 (44.5 overs)
Sangeeth Cooray 107 (126); Eranga Rathnayake 5/46 (9 overs)		Nipuna Gamage 46 (62); Vishad Randika 2/21 (5 overs)

Colts Cricket Club won by 73 runs
Colts Cricket Club Ground, Colombo
Umpires: Susantha Dissanayake and Prageeth Rambukwella

- Colts Cricket Club won the toss and elected to field.
- Dilum Fernando (Kalutara Town Club) made his List A debut.

6 March 2019
Scorecard

Lankan Cricket Club; 225/8 (50 overs)	v	Colombo Cricket Club; 226/6 (36.5 overs)
Chanaka Ruwansiri 67 (61); Wanindu Hasaranga 4/47 (10 overs)		Wanindu Hasaranga 85* (42); Dulanjana Mendis 3/47 (7 overs)

Colombo Cricket Club won by 4 wickets
Colombo Cricket Club Ground, Colombo
Umpires: Chamara de Soysa and Raveendra Wimalasiri

- Lankan Cricket Club won the toss and elected to bat.
- Hiruna Sigera (Lankan Cricket Club) made his List A debut.

8 March 2019
Scorecard

Kalutara Town Club; 172 (49.1 overs)	v	Saracens Sports Club; 175/4 (35 overs)
Nipuna Gamage 35 (49); Saliya Saman 2/20 (8.1 overs)		Andy Solomons 43 (70); Pasindu Madushan 3/57 (8 overs)

Saracens Sports Club won by 6 wickets
Surrey Village, Maggona
Umpires: Vidura Prasad and Nilantha Semasinghe

- Kalutara Town Club won the toss and elected to bat.

8 March 2019
Scorecard

Colombo Cricket Club; 193 (45.5 overs)	v	Colts Cricket Club; 196/6 (44.5 overs)
Ron Chandraguptha 62 (79); Kavishka Anjula 4/40 (10 overs)		Sadeera Samarawickrama 85* (113); Malinda Pushpakumara 2/31 (10 overs)

Colts Cricket Club won by 4 wickets
Colts Cricket Club Ground, Colombo
Umpires: Chamara de Soysa and Kapil Kottahachchi

- Colombo Cricket Club won the toss and elected to bat.
- Manelker De Silva (Colombo Cricket Club) made his List A debut.

9 March 2019
Scorecard

Badureliya Sports Club; 223 (49 overs)	v	Lankan Cricket Club; 168 (43.4 overs)
Sachith Pathirana 64 (54); Dulanjana Mendis 6/45 (10 overs)		Hiruna Sigera 39 (91); Alankara Asanka Silva 4/27 (8.4 overs)

Badureliya Sports Club won by 55 runs
Surrey Village, Maggona
Umpires: Rohitha Kottahachchi and Chaturan Sanjeewa

- Lankan Cricket Club won the toss and elected to field.
- Gihan Rathnayake (Badureliya Sports Club) made his List A debut.

10 March 2019
Scorecard

Colombo Cricket Club; 211 (48 overs)	v	Saracens Sports Club; 200 (48.4 overs)
Minod Bhanuka 83 (99); Sachithra Perera 3/47 (10 overs)		Nipun Karunanayake 40 (80); Malinda Pushpakumara 2/32 (10 overs)

Colombo Cricket Club won by 11 runs
Colombo Cricket Club Ground, Colombo
Umpires: Sisira Kumara Perera and Hemantha Boteju

- Saracens Sports Club won the toss and elected to field.
- Sonal Dinusha (Colombo Cricket Club) made his List A debut.

10 March 2019
Scorecard

Lankan Cricket Club; 268/8 (50 overs)	v	Colts Cricket Club; 271/3 (47.3 overs)
Geeth Kumara 76 (96); Kavishka Anjula 3/56 (10 overs)		Hashan Dumindu 111 (112); Poorna Charuka 2/39 (8 overs)

Colts Cricket Club won by 7 wickets
Colts Cricket Club Ground, Colombo
Umpires: Gamini Dissanayake and Upul Wewage

- Lankan Cricket Club won the toss and elected to bat.
- Lahiru Dilshan and Deelaka Supun (Lankan Cricket Club) both made their List A debuts.

10 March 2019
Scorecard

Badureliya Sports Club; 137 (33.1 overs)	v	Kalutara Town Club; 138/3 (28.4 overs)
Lahiru Samarakoon 35 (56); Matheesha Perera 3/22 (9.1 overs)		Nilushan Nonis 55* (66); Buddika Sanjeewa 1/20 (6 overs)

Kalutara Town Club won by 7 wickets
Surrey Village, Maggona
Umpires: Ravindra Kottahachchi and Chaminda Hathurusingha

- Badureliya Sports Club won the toss and elected to bat.
- Sumudu Sameera (Kalutara Town Club) made his List A debut.

12 March 2019
Scorecard

Colts Cricket Club; 107 (34.5 overs)	v	Saracens Sports Club; 108/5 (28.4 overs)
Sangeeth Cooray 31 (72); Chamikara Edirisinghe 6/14 (6.5 overs)		Gamindu Kanishka 45* (66); Prabath Jayasuriya 3/50 (10 overs)

Saracens Sports Club won by 5 wickets
Colts Cricket Club Ground, Colombo
Umpires: Hemantha Boteju and Ranganath Prasanna

- Saracens Sports Club won the toss and elected to field.

12 March 2019
Scorecard

Badureliya Sports Club; 179 (41.1 overs)	v	Colombo Cricket Club; 183/4 (35.1 overs)
Kosala Kulasekara 42 (38); Malinda Pushpakumara 3/20 (7 overs)		Ron Chandraguptha 75 (94); Nuwan Thushara 2/43 (6 overs)

Colombo Cricket Club won by 6 wickets
Colombo Cricket Club Ground, Colombo
Umpires: Deepal Gunawardene and Niroshana Amarasinghe

- Badureliya Sports Club won the toss and elected to bat.

12 March 2019
Scorecard

Kalutara Town Club; 204/9 (50 overs)	v	Lankan Cricket Club; 207/8 (49.2 overs)
Ravindu Kodituwakku 101 (136); Raju Gayashan 2/21 (6 overs)		Maduranga Zoysa 81 (68); Lakshan Jayasinghe 3/50 (10 overs)

Lankan Cricket Club won by 2 wickets
Surrey Village, Maggona
Umpires: Asanga Jayasooriya and Kitsiri Jayaweera

- Lankan Cricket Club won the toss and elected to field.

=== Group D ===
4 March 2019
Scorecard

Kandy Customs Cricket Club; 76 (33.5 overs)	v	Chilaw Marians Cricket Club; 79/2 (9.2 overs)
Sumedha Dissanayake 30 (69); Nimesh Vimukthi 3/12 (3.5 overs)		Yashodha Lanka 42 (27); Sumedha Dissanayake 2/14 (4 overs)

Chilaw Marians Cricket Club won by 8 wickets
FTZ Sports Complex, Katunayake
Umpires: Kamal Indrajith and Keerthi Bandara

- Chilaw Marians Cricket Club won the toss and elected to field.
- Karan Nande, Irosh Fernando (Chilaw Marians Cricket Club), Buddika Mendis, Ravishka Wijesiri, H Hennanayake, Shehan Hirudika, Buddika Prasad, Sumedha Dissanayake, Dilan Suraweera, Nimnaka Ratnayake, Vimukthi Umagiliyage and C Fernando (Kandy Customs Cricket Club) all made their List A debuts.

4 March 2019
Scorecard

Ragama Cricket Club; 332/3 (50 overs)	v	Negombo Cricket Club; 138 (35.2 overs)
Dineth Thimodya 127 (119); Shehan Jayasuriya 1/37 (8 overs)		Sahan Arachchige 63* (80); Nishan Peiris 2/20 (8 overs)

Ragama Cricket Club won by 194 runs
Thurstan College Ground, Colombo
Umpires: Krishantha Rodrigo and Lyndon Hannibal

- Negombo Cricket Club won the toss and elected to field.
- Lihan Dulshan and Ashen Perera (Negombo Cricket Club) both made their List A debuts.

4 March 2019
Scorecard

Sri Lanka Army Sports Club; 310/9 (50 overs)	v	Sri Lanka Air Force Sports Club; 277 (48 overs)
Dushan Vimukthi 79 (105); Sampath Perera 3/50 (10 overs)		Suminda Lakshan 45 (45); Asela Gunaratne 3/38 (4 overs)

Sri Lanka Army Sports Club won by 33 runs
Army Ground, Panagoda
Umpires: Saman Mohan de Silva and Prageeth Rambukwella

- Sri Lanka Air Force Sports Club won the toss and elected to field.
- Kaweesh Kumara (Sri Lanka Army Sports Club) made his List A debut.

6 March 2019
Scorecard

Negombo Cricket Club; 236 (49.5 overs)	v	Chilaw Marians Cricket Club; 240/7 (47.2 overs)
Lasith Croospulle 50 (65); Thikshila de Silva 5/42 (8.5 overs)		Risith Upamal 67 (109); Roshen Fernando 4/35 (10 overs)

Chilaw Marians Cricket Club won by 3 wickets
FTZ Sports Complex, Katunayake
Umpires: Shantha Fonseka and Nilan De Silva

- Negombo Cricket Club won the toss and elected to bat.

6 March 2019
Scorecard

Ragama Cricket Club; 300/4 (50 overs)	v	Sri Lanka Air Force Sports Club; 158 (39.5 overs)
Shehan Fernando 79 (76); Suminda Lakshan 2/41 (8 overs)		Suminda Lakshan 36 (65); Nishan Peiris 4/33 (7.5 overs)

Ragama won by 142 runs
Air Force Ground, Katunayake
Umpires: Hemantha Boteju and Nilantha Semasinghe

- Sri Lanka Air Force Sports Club won the toss and elected to field.
- Nimesha Mendis (Sri Lanka Air Force Sports Club) made his List A debut.

6 March 2019
Scorecard

Sri Lanka Army Sports Club; 388/7 (50 overs)	v	Kandy Customs Cricket Club; 127 (28.5 overs)
Ashan Randika 108 (72); Vimukthi Umagiliyage 3/65 (9.5 overs)		Nimnaka Ratnayake 36 (29); Seekkuge Prasanna 4/34 (10 overs)

Sri Lanka Army Sports Club won by 261 runs
Army Ground, Panagoda
Umpires: Kapil Kottahachchi and Ranganath Prasanna

- Kandy Customs Cricket Club won the toss and elected to field
- Ravindu Thiwanka, Anju Karunanayake (Kandy Customs Cricket Club) and Kasun de Silva (Sri Lanka Army Sports Club) all made their List A debuts.

8 March 2019
Scorecard

Chilaw Marians Cricket Club; 176 (44 overs)	v	Sri Lanka Air Force Sports Club; 179/5 (38.2 overs)
Thikshila de Silva 51 (59); Suminda Lakshan 4/20 (6 overs)		Chanaka Wijesinghe 45* (51); Pulina Tharanga 2/26 (5 overs)

Sri Lanka Air Force Sports Club won by 5 wickets
FTZ Sports Complex, Katunayake
Umpires: Niroshana Amarasinghe and Prageeth Rambukwella

- Chilaw Marians Cricket Club won the toss and elected to bat.
- DT Liyanage (Sri Lanka Air Force Sports Club) made his List A debut.

8 March 2019
Scorecard

Sri Lanka Army Sports Club; 247 (48 overs)	v	Ragama Cricket Club; 201 (46 overs)
Lakshan Edirisinghe 67 (84); Nishan Peiris 5/40 (10 overs)		Sameera de Zoysa 62 (82); Nuwan Liyanapathirana 3/29 (6 overs)

Sri Lanka Army Sports Club won by 46 runs
Army Ground, Panagoda
Umpires: Ravindra Kottahachchi and Sanjeewa Fernando

- Ragama Cricket Club won the toss and elected to field.
- Thulina Dilshan (Sri Lanka Army Sports Club) made his List A debut.

8 March 2019
Scorecard

Negombo Cricket Club; 193 (41 overs)	v	Kandy Customs Cricket Club; 82 (23.2 overs)
Sahan Arachchige 62 (73); Sumedha Dissanayake 6/30 (9 overs)		Buddika Mendis 25 (55); Sahan Arachchige 5/26 (6.1 overs)

Negombo Cricket Club won by 111 runs
Air Force Ground, Katunayake
Umpires: Mohan de Silva and Upul Wewage

- Negombo Cricket Club won the toss and elected to field.
- Saman Kumara (Negombo Cricket Club) made his List A debut.

10 March 2019
Scorecard

Chilaw Marians Cricket Club; 253 (50 overs)	v	Sri Lanka Army Sports Club; 254/5 (46.1 overs)
Karan Nande 106 (103); Janith Silva 3/31 (10 overs)		Himasha Liyanage 87 (82); Roshan Jayatissa 2/31 (5.1 overs)

Sri Lanka Army Sports Club won by 5 wickets
Army Ground, Panagoda
Umpires: Kapil Kottahachchi and Deepal Gunawardene

- Sri Lanka Army Sports Club won the toss and elected to field.

10 March 2019
Scorecard

Kandy Customs Cricket Club; 89 (28.4 overs)	v	Ragama Cricket Club; 92/1 (13.5 overs)
Buddika Mendis 29 (40); Nishan Peiris 5/16 (7.4 overs)		Dineth Thimodya 45 (47); Sumedha Dissanayake 1/17 (4 overs)

Ragama Cricket Club won by 9 wickets
Nondescripts Cricket Club Ground, Colombo
Umpires: Susantha Dissanayake and Lyndon Hannibal

- Ragama Cricket Club won the toss and elected to field.
- WTD Fernando and Vittorio Roberto (Kandy Customs Cricket Club) both made their List A debuts.

10 March 2019
Scorecard

Negombo Cricket Club; 222 (49.1 overs)	v	Sri Lanka Air Force Sports Club; 158 (41.4 overs)
Shehan Jayasuriya 55 (60); Sampath Perera 3/29 (7 overs)		Kaushalya Gajasinghe 33 (42); Sahan Arachchige 3/28 (10 overs)

Negombo Cricket Club won by 64 runs
Air Force Ground, Katunayake
Umpires: Shantha Fonseka and Keerthi Bandara

- Sri Lanka Air Force Sports Club won the toss and elected to field.
- Ravindu Dilshan (Negombo Cricket Club) made his List A debut.

12 March 2019
Scorecard

Ragama Cricket Club; 224 (49.5 overs)	v	Chilaw Marians Cricket Club; 228/9 (45.1 overs)
Roshen Silva 52 (67); Thikshila de Silva 3/62 (9.5 overs)		Nimesh Vimukthi 67 (61); Amila Aponso 4/22 (10 overs)

Chilaw Cricket Club won by 1 wicket
FTZ Sports Complex, Katunayake
Umpires: Rohitha Kottahachchi and Upul Wewage

- Ragama Cricket Club won the toss and elected to bat.

12 March 2019
Scorecard

Negombo Cricket Club; 84 (25.1 overs)	v	Sri Lanka Army Sports Club; 85/7 (21.2 overs)
Prasansana Jayamanne 24 (39); Sanjika Ridma 4/26 (6.1 overs)		Dushan Vimukthi 22 (30); Roshen Fernando 4/38 (8 overs)

Sri Lanka Army Sports Club won by 3 wickets
Panadura Esplanade, Panadura
Umpires: Raveendra Wimalasiri and Nilantha Semasinghe

- Negombo Cricket Club won the toss and elected to bat.

12 March 2019
Scorecard

Sri Lanka Air Force Sports Club; 243 (48.3 overs)	v	Kandy Customs Cricket Club; 202/9 (50 overs)
Chanaka Wijesinghe 80 (96); Sumedha Dissanayake 3/35 (10 overs)		Kavinda Manamperi 52* (83); Suminda Lakshan 5/45 (10 overs)

Sri Lanka Air Force Sports Club won by 41 runs
Air Force Ground, Katunayake
Umpires: Ranjith Vishwakula and Nilan De Silva

- Kandy Customs Cricket Club won the toss and elected to field.
- Ravindu Gunawardene, MSS Jayasekara, Heshan Umendra, Asanka Lakshan (Sri Lanka Air Force Sports Club), TGB Prasad, Dharshana Amarasiri, Kavinda Manamperi, Gihan De Zoysa and KLJ Perera (Kandy Customs Cricket Club) all made their List A debuts.

=== Quarterfinals ===
1st Quarterfinal
15 March 2019
Scorecard

Ragama Cricket Club; 204 (49.5 overs)	v	Sinhalese Sports Club; 205/5 (39.2 overs)
Sanjaya Chathuranga 58 (98); Nuwan Pradeep 4/30 (9.5 overs)		Sachithra Senanayake 96* (103); Amila Aponso 2/33 (10 overs)

Sinhalese Sports Club won by 5 wickets
P Sara Oval, Colombo
Umpires: Gamini Dissanayake and Raveendra Wimalasiri

- Sinhalese Sports Club won the toss and elected to field.
- Sanjula Bandara (Ragama Cricket Club) made his List A debut.

2nd Quarterfinal
15 March 2019
Scorecard

Colombo Cricket Club; 297 (48.3 overs)	v	Nondescripts Cricket Club; 251 (46.4 overs)
Minod Bhanuka 66 (74); Chamika Karunaratne 4/36 (8.3 overs)		Lahiru Udara 96 (89); Lahiru Gamage 3/53 (8.4 overs)

Colombo Cricket Club won by 46 runs
FTZ Sports Complex, Katunayake
Umpires: Ravindra Kottahachchi and Keerthi Bandara

- Nondescripts Cricket Club won the toss and elected to field.

3rd Quarterfinal
15 March 2019
Scorecard

Panadura Sports Club; 245 (49.2 overs)	v	Saracens Sports Club; 249/3 (42.4 overs)
Asantha Basnayake 75 (82); Saliya Saman 3/48 (9.2 overs)		Milinda Siriwardana 69* (56); Sehan Weerasinghe 2/54 (9 overs)

Saracens Sports Club won by 7 wickets
Nondescripts Cricket Club Ground, Colombo
Umpires: Hemantha Boteju and Asanga Jayasooriya

- Saracens Sports Club won the toss and elected to field.
- Nipun Lakshan (Panadura Sports Club) made his List A debut.

4th Quarterfinal
15 March 2019
Scorecard

Sri Lanka Army Sports Club; 209 (49.4 overs)	v	Moors Sports Club; 210/5 (39.3 overs)
Dilshan de Soysa 57 (102); Shiran Fernando 4/25 (9.4 overs)		Chamara Silva 77* (59); Seekkuge Prasanna 3/48 (10 overs)

Moors Sports Club won by 5 wickets
Colts Cricket Club Ground, Colombo
Umpires: Kapil Kottahachchi and Pradeep Udawatta

- Sri Lanka Army Sports Club won the toss and elected to bat.

=== Finals ===
1st Semi-final
17 March 2019
Scorecard

Sinhalese Sports Club; 296/9 (50 overs)	v	Saracens Sports Club; 190/6 (39 overs)
Dimuth Karunaratne 109 (115); Saliya Saman 3/60 (10 overs)		Nipun Karunanayake 81 (92); Dhammika Prasad 2/40 (6 overs)

Sinhalese Sports Club won by 36 runs (D/L method)
Nondescripts Cricket Club Ground, Colombo
Umpires: Rohitha Kottahachchi and Nilan De Silva

- Sinhalese Sports Club won the toss and elected to bat.

2nd Semi-final
17 March 2019
Scorecard

Moors Sports Club; 138 (43 overs)	v	Colombo Cricket Club; 143/5 (26.2 overs)
Lahiru Attanayake 51 (89); Wanindu Hasaranga 4/43 (10 overs)		Ron Chandraguptha 55 (74); Ramesh Mendis 2/29 (6 overs)

Colombo Cricket Club won by 5 wickets
Colts Cricket Club Ground, Colombo
Umpires: Hemantha Boteju and Pradeep Udawatta

- Colombo Cricket Club won the toss and elected to field.

Final
19 March 2019
Scorecard

Colombo Cricket Club; 250/8 (50 overs)	v	Sinhalese Sports Club; 254/3 (44.2 overs)
Minod Bhanuka 49 (58); Himesh Ramanayake 2/26 (6 overs)		Danushka Gunathilaka 116 (123); Wanindu Hasaranga 1/27 (8 overs)

Sinhalese Sports Club won by 7 wickets
R. Premadasa Stadium, Colombo
Umpires: Ravindra Kottahachchi and Raveendra Wimalasiri

- Colombo Cricket Club won the toss and elected to bat.
