= 2018–19 SLC Twenty20 Tournament =

Cricket tournament

- Dates: 15 – 27 February 2019
- Administrator: Sri Lanka Cricket
- Cricket format: Twenty20
- Tournament format: Round-robin then knockout
- Host: Sri Lanka
- Champions: Moors Sports Club
- Participants: 24
- Most runs: Dinesh Chandimal (261)
- Most wickets: Malinda Pushpakumara (20)

The 2018–19 SLC Twenty20 Tournament was a Twenty20 cricket tournament that was held in Sri Lanka. It was played between twenty-four domestic teams in Sri Lanka, with the tournament running from 15 to 27 February 2019. Nondescripts Cricket Club were the defending champions.

On the opening day of the tournament, Sinhalese Sports Club beat Saracens Sports Club in the Super Over, after the match ended as a tie, and Sadeera Samarawickrama scored an unbeaten century for Colts Cricket Club against Police Sports Club. On 19 February 2019, Dinesh Chandimal also scored a century in the tournament, a day after he was dropped from Sri Lanka's One Day International (ODI) squad for their series against South Africa.

Following the conclusion of the group stage fixtures, Chilaw Marians Cricket Club, Colombo Cricket Club, Galle Cricket Club, Moors Sports Club, Nondescripts Cricket Club, Ragama Cricket Club, Sri Lanka Army Sports Club and Tamil Union Cricket and Athletic Club had all progressed to the knockout phase of the tournament. From the quarterfinals, Colombo Cricket Club, Moors Sports Club, Nondescripts Cricket Club and Sri Lanka Army Sports Club all advanced to the semi-finals. Colombo Cricket Club won their quarterfinal fixture against Ragama Cricket Club in the Super Over, after the match was tied.

In the first semi-final, Moors Sports Club beat Sri Lanka Army Sports Club by six wickets, despite Ashan Randika scoring a century for Sri Lanka Army. The second semi-final saw Nondescripts Cricket Club beat Colombo Cricket Club by one run, with the match going to the final ball. Moors Sports Club won the tournament, after they beat Nondescripts Cricket Club by one wicket in the final.

== Fixtures ==
=== Group stage ===
==== Group A ====
15 February 2019
Scorecard

Nondescripts Cricket Club; 142/6 (20 overs)	v	Panadura Sports Club; 111 (17.1 overs)
Mahela Udawatte 45 (32); Charana Nanayakkara 2/35 (4 overs)		Asantha Basnayake 36 (23); Asitha Fernando 3/21 (3.1 overs)

Nondescripts Cricket Club won by 31 runs
Colombo Cricket Club Ground, Colombo
Umpires: Ravindra Kottahachchi and Raveendra Wimalasiri

- Panadura Sports Club won the toss and elected to field.
- Asantha Basnayake, Charana Nanayakkara, Nipun Lakshan and Tharusha Fernando (Panadura Sports Club) all made their T20 debuts.

15 February 2019
Scorecard

Sinhalese Sports Club; 145 (20 overs)	v	Saracens Sports Club; 145/7 (20 overs)
Dasun Shanaka 64 (48); Andy Solomons 3/14 (4 overs)		Nipun Karunanayake 50* (45); Jeffrey Vandersay 2/18 (4 overs)

Match tied
(Sinhalese Sports Club won the Super Over)
Bloomfield Cricket and Athletic Club Ground, Colombo
Umpires: Asanga Jayasooriya and Lyndon Hannibal

- Saracens Sports Club won the toss and elected to field.
- Ranitha Liyanarachchi (Saracens Sports Club) made his T20 debut.

15 February 2019
Scorecard

Bloomfield Cricket and Athletic Club; 106/9 (20 overs)	v	Moors Sports Club; 107/2 (13.1 overs)
Asantha Singappuli 39 (37); Shiran Fernando 2/16 (4 overs)		Chamara Silva 60* (37); Andrew Parays 2/30 (3 overs)

Moors Sports Club won by 8 wickets
Colombo Cricket Club Ground, Colombo
Umpires: Ravindra Kottahachchi and Raveendra Wimalasiri

- Bloomfield Cricket and Athletic Club won the toss and elected to bat.
- Ayana Siriwardhana (Moors Sports Club), Sanoj Darshika, Asantha Singappuli, Asel Sigera, Tharindu Karunaratne, Andrew Parays and Dileepa Jayalath (Bloomfield Cricket and Athletic Club) all made their T20 debuts.

16 February 2019
Scorecard

Saracens Sports Club; 146/9 (20 overs)	v	Panadura Sports Club; 128/8 (20 overs)
Nipun Karunanayake 49 (41); Vinodh Perera 3/38 (4 overs)		Charana Nanayakkara 31 (13); Saliya Saman 5/18 (4 overs)

Saracens Sports Club won by 18 runs
Army Ground, Panagoda
Umpires: Rohitha Kottahachchi and Asanga Jayasooriya

- Panadura Sports Club won the toss and elected to field.
- Jayanga Peiris (Panadura Sports Club) made his T20 debut.

16 February 2019
Scorecard

Nondescripts Cricket Club; 192/2 (20 overs)	v	Bloomfield Cricket and Athletic Club; 125/5 (20 overs)
Mahela Udawatte 57* (35); Dileepa Jayalath 2/43 (4 overs)		Asantha Singappuli 52 (50); Sachintha Peiris 2/16 (4 overs)

Nondescripts Cricket Club won by 67 runs
Burgher Recreation Club Ground, Colombo
Umpires: Kapil Kottahachchi and Prageeth Rambukwella

- Bloomfield Cricket and Athletic Club won the toss and elected to field.
- Chathuranga Dikkumbura, Kevin Peiris and Chathura Obeyesekere (Bloomfield Cricket and Athletic Club) all made their T20 debuts.

16 February 2019
Scorecard

Sinhalese Sports Club; 143/9 (20 overs)	v	Moors Sports Club; 124/4 (17 overs)
Sandun Weerakkody 45 (18); Adeesha Thilanchana 3/22 (4 overs)		Irosh Samarasooriya 47* (37); Jeffrey Vandersay 2/47 (4 overs)

Moors Sports Club won by 8 runs (D/L method)
Burgher Recreation Club Ground, Colombo
Umpires: Kapil Kottahachchi and Prageeth Rambukwella

- Sinhalese Sports Club won the toss and elected to bat.

18 February 2019
Scorecard

Panadura Sports Club; 188/8 (20 overs)	v	Bloomfield Cricket and Athletic Club; 125 (16.2 overs)
Imranullah Aslam 77 (46); Chamod Piumal 2/31 (4 overs)		Asantha Singappuli 26 (19); Tharindu Maduranga 4/15 (4 overs)

Panadura Sports Club won by 63 runs
Moors Sports Club Ground, Colombo
Umpires: Raveendra Wimalasiri and Pradeep Udawatta

- Bloomfield Cricket and Athletic Club won the toss and elected to field.
- Shaluka Silva (Bloomfield Cricket and Athletic Club), Thimira Jayasinghe and Umeshka Morais (Panadura Sports Club) all made their T20 debuts.

18 February 2019
Scorecard

Nondescripts Cricket Club; 130/6 (20 overs)	v	Sinhalese Sports Club; 131/3 (15 overs)
Mahela Udawatte 43* (33); Thisara Perera 2/25 (3 overs)		Shammu Ashan 44* (30); Sachintha Peiris 1/17 (2 overs)

Sinhalese Sports Club won by 7 wickets
FTZ Sports Complex, Katunayake
Umpires: Hemantha Boteju and Kapil Kottahachchi

- Sinhalese Sports Club won the toss and elected to field.
- Malinga Amarasinghe (Nondescripts Cricket Club) and Krishan Sanjula (Sinhalese Sports Club) both made their T20 debuts.

18 February 2019
Scorecard

Moors Sports Club; 162/6 (20 overs)	v	Saracens Sports Club; 163/4 (18.4 overs)
Ramesh Mendis 67 (32); Mohomed Dilshad 2/23 (4 overs)		Ranitha Liyanarachchi 68 (45); Adeesha Thilanchana 1/28 (3.4 overs)

Saracens Sports Club won by 6 wickets
FTZ Sports Complex, Katunayake
Umpires: Hemantha Boteju and Kapil Kottahachchi

- Saracens Sports Club won the toss and elected to field.

19 February 2019
Scorecard

Sinhalese Sports Club; 149/8 (20 overs)	v	Bloomfield Cricket and Athletic Club; 150/6 (17.1 overs)
Sandun Weerakkody 41 (24); Asel Sigera 2/17 (4 overs)		Madushan Ravichandrakumar 47* (30); Jeffrey Vandersay 2/40 (4 overs)

Bloomfield Cricket and Athletic Club won by 4 wickets
Thurstan College Ground, Colombo
Umpires: Rohitha Kottahachchi and Lyndon Hannibal

- Bloomfield Cricket and Athletic Club won the toss and elected to field.
- Nipun Dananjaya and Thilan Prashan (Sinhalese Sports Club) both made their T20 debuts.

19 February 2019
Scorecard

Nondescripts Cricket Club; 196/5 (20 overs)	v	Saracens Sports Club; 149/9 (20 overs)
Dinesh Chandimal 101* (62); Raveen Sayer 2/28 (2 overs)		Ranitha Liyanarachchi 48 (33); Sachindu Colombage 3/8 (2 overs)

Nondescripts Cricket Club won by 47 runs
Nondescripts Cricket Club Ground, Colombo
Umpires: Ravindra Kottahachchi and Asanga Jayasooriya

- Saracens Sports Club won the toss and elected to bat.
- Kamil Mishara and Sachindu Colombage (Nondescripts Cricket Club) both made their T20 debuts.

19 February 2019
Scorecard

Panadura Sports Club; 164/8 (20 overs)	v	Moors Sports Club; 167/7 (19.3 overs)
Asantha Basnayake 37 (26); Chanuk Dilshan 3/29 (4 overs)		Pabasara Waduge 43 (32); Charana Nanayakkara 3/20 (3.3 overs)

Moors Sports Club won by 3 wickets
Nondescripts Cricket Club Ground, Colombo
Umpires: Ravindra Kottahachchi and Asanga Jayasooriya

- Panadura Sports Club won the toss and elected to bat.
- Amitha Kaushalya (Panadura Sports Club) made his T20 debut.

21 February 2019
Scorecard

Sinhalese Sports Club; 163/5 (20 overs)	v	Panadura Sports Club; 164/6 (19.1 overs)
Dasun Shanaka 55 (36); Mishen Silva 2/30 (4 overs)		Sehan Weerasinghe 47 (33); Tharindu Ratnayake 3/17 (4 overs)

Panadura Sports Club won by 4 wickets
Army Ground, Panagoda
Umpires: Hemantha Boteju and Asanga Jayasooriya

- Panadura Sports Club won the toss and elected to field.
- Hasindu Anjana (Panadura Sports Club) made his T20 debut.

21 February 2019
Scorecard

Nondescripts Cricket Club; 146/9 (20 overs)	v	Moors Sports Club; 147/7 (19.3 overs)
Lahiru Udara 37 (23); Tharindu Kaushal 3/23 (4 overs)		Charitha Kumarasinghe 37 (19); Malinga Amarasinghe 2/41 (4 overs)

Moors Sports Club won by 3 wickets
P Sara Oval, Colombo
Umpires: Pradeep Udawatta and Prageeth Rambukwella

- Moors Sports Club won the toss and elected to field.

21 February 2019
Scorecard

Bloomfield Cricket and Athletic Club; 155/8 (20 overs)	v	Saracens Sports Club; 156/5 (20 overs)
Madushan Ravichandrakumar 58 (32); Saliya Saman 3/31 (4 overs)		Saliya Saman 47* (23); Kasun Ekanayake 1/6 (1 over)

Saracens Sports Club won by 5 wickets
P Sara Oval, Colombo
Umpires: Pradeep Udawatta and Prageeth Rambukwella

- Saracens Sports Club won the toss and elected to field.

==== Group B ====
15 February 2019
Scorecard

Colts Cricket Club; 198/4 (20 overs)	v	Police Sports Club; 159 (20 overs)
Sadeera Samarawickrama 100* (65); Mahesh Priyadarshana 2/29 (4 overs)		Manjula Jayawardene 58 (36); Nishan Madushka 3/15 (4 overs)

Colts Cricket Club won by 39 runs
Moors Sports Club Ground, Colombo
Umpires: Hemantha Boteju and Gamini Dissanayake

- Police Sports Club won the toss and elected to field.
- Vishad Randika (Colts Cricket Club), Lasan de Silva, Sanath Ranjan and Supun Madushanka (Police Sports Club) all made their T20 debuts.

15 February 2019
Scorecard

Chilaw Marians Cricket Club; 170/9 (20 overs)	v	Negombo Cricket Club; 171/7 (20 overs)
Nimesh Vimukthi 45 (32); Sahan Adeesha 3/34 (4 overs)		Shehan Jayasuriya 91* (59); Pulina Tharanga 3/16 (3 overs)

Negombo Cricket Club won by 3 wickets
Moors Sports Club Ground, Colombo
Umpires: Hemantha Boteju and Gamini Dissanayake

- Chilaw Marians Cricket Club won the toss and elected to bat.
- Irosh Fernando (Chilaw Marians Cricket Club) and Ravindra Karunaratne (Negombo Cricket Club) both made their T20 debuts.

15 February 2019
Scorecard

Kalutara Town Club; 134/6 (20 overs)	v	Colombo Cricket Club; 135/2 (15.2 overs)
Nipuna Gamage 57 (47); Lahiru Gamage 3/21 (4 overs)		Ashan Priyanjan 58* (39); Pasindu Madushan 1/2 (1 over)

Colombo Cricket Club won by 8 wickets
Bloomfield Cricket and Athletic Club Ground, Colombo
Umpires: Asanga Jayasooriya and Lyndon Hannibal

- Colombo Cricket Club won the toss and elected to field.
- Heshan Hettiarchchi (Colombo Cricket Club) made his T20 debut.

16 February 2019
Scorecard

Colts Cricket Club; 174/8 (20 overs)	v	Negombo Cricket Club; 121 (17.3 overs)
Priyamal Perera 63 (37); Sahan Adeesha 3/35 (4 overs)		Shehan Jayasuriya 33 (22); Akila Dananjaya 4/17 (4 overs)

Colts Cricket Club won by 53 runs
Police Park Ground, Colombo
Umpires: Gamini Dissanayake and Keerthi Bandara

- Colts Cricket Club won the toss and elected to bat.

16 February 2019
Scorecard

Police Sports Club; 60 (14.2 overs)	v	Colombo Cricket Club; 61/1 (5 overs)
Supun Madushanka 15 (13); Malinda Pushpakumara 5/13 (4 overs)		Dilshan Munaweera 31* (13); Mahesh Priyadarshana 1/28 (2 overs)

Colombo Cricket Club won by 9 wickets
Army Ground, Panagoda
Umpires: Rohitha Kottahachchi and Asanga Jayasooriya

- Colombo Cricket Club won the toss and elected to field.
- Malinda Abhishek and Kalyana Rathnapriya (Police Sports Club) both made their T20 debuts.

16 February 2019
Scorecard

Chilaw Marians Cricket Club; 177/6 (20 overs)	v	Kalutara Town Club; 113/9 (20 overs)
Harsha Cooray 51* (45); Matheesha Perera 2/15 (4 overs)		Matheesha Perera 32 (31); Nimasara Atharagalla 3/21 (4 overs)

Chilaw Marians Cricket Club won by 64 runs
Police Park Ground, Colombo
Umpires: Gamini Dissanayake and Keerthi Bandara

- Chilaw Marians Cricket Club won the toss and elected to bat.
- Risith Upamal, Nimasara Atharagalla (Chilaw Marians Cricket Club) and V Amugoda (Kalutara Town Club) all made their T20 debuts.

18 February 2019
Scorecard

Chilaw Marians Cricket Club; 184 (19.4 overs)	v	Colts Cricket Club; 183/8 (20 overs)
Harsha Cooray 63 (38); Akila Dananjaya 3/27 (4 overs)		Avishka Fernando 52 (23); Nimesh Perera 2/18 (4 overs)

Chilaw Marians Cricket Club won by 1 run
Bloomfield Cricket and Athletic Club Ground, Colombo
Umpires: Gamini Dissanayake and Lyndon Hannibal

- Chilaw Marians Cricket Club won the toss and elected to bat.

18 February 2019
Scorecard

Police Sports Club; 162/5 (20 overs)	v	Kalutara Town Club; 105 (18 overs)
Malinga Maligaspe 62 (54); Matheesha Perera 3/30 (4 overs)		Eranga Rathnayake 31 (26); Sanath Ranjan 3/25 (4 overs)

Police Sports Club won by 57 runs
Bloomfield Cricket and Athletic Club Ground, Colombo
Umpires: Gamini Dissanayake and Lyndon Hannibal

- Kalutara Town Club won the toss and elected to field.
- Pawan Dias and Kamal Pushpakumara (Police Sports Club) both made their T20 debuts.

18 February 2019
Scorecard

Colombo Cricket Club; 211/8 (20 overs)	v	Negombo Cricket Club; 93 (15.3 overs)
Dilshan Munaweera 82 (44); Sahan Adeesha 3/51 (4 overs)		Prasansana Jayamanne 39 (22); Wanindu Hasaranga 5/26 (3.3 overs)

Colombo Cricket Club won by 118 runs
Moors Sports Club Ground, Colombo
Umpires: Raveendra Wimalasiri and Pradeep Udawatta

- Negombo Cricket Club won the toss and elected to field.

19 February 2019
Scorecard

Colts Cricket Club; 150/7 (20 overs)	v	Kalutara Town Club; 102/6 (20 overs)
Sadeera Samarawickrama 55 (55); Sachitha Jayathilake 4/22 (4 overs)		Nipuna Gamage 22 (25); Prabath Jayasuriya 2/14 (4 overs)

Colts Cricket Club won by 48 runs
FTZ Sports Complex, Katunayake
Umpires: Prageeth Rambukwella and Keerthi Bandara

- Kalutara Town Club won the toss and elected to field.

19 February 2019
Scorecard

Chilaw Marians Cricket Club; 168/8 (20 overs)	v	Colombo Cricket Club; 152 (19.2 overs)
Harsha Cooray 59 (43); Malinda Pushpakumara 4/13 (4 overs)		Dilshan Munaweera 29 (17); Nimasara Atharagalla 2/12 (1.2 overs)

Chilaw Marians Cricket Club won by 16 runs
Thurstan College Ground, Colombo
Umpires: Rohitha Kottahachchi and Lyndon Hannibal

- Colombo Cricket Club won the toss and elected to field.

19 February 2019
Scorecard

Negombo Cricket Club; 165/7 (20 overs)	v	Police Sports Club; 164/9 (20 overs)
Shehan Jayasuriya 71 (54); Sanath Ranjan 2/25 (4 overs)		Malinga Maligaspe 54 (54); Upul Indrasiri 3/29 (4 overs)

Negombo Cricket Club won by 1 run
FTZ Sports Complex, Katunayake
Umpires: Prageeth Rambukwella and Keerthi Bandara

- Negombo Cricket Club won the toss and elected to bat.
- Samitha Dilshan (Negombo Cricket Club) made his T20 debut.

21 February 2019
Scorecard

Chilaw Marians Cricket Club; 209/8 (20 overs)	v	Police Sports Club; 98 (19 overs)
Thikshila de Silva 51 (29); Charith Rajapakshe 4/44 (4 overs)		Kamal Pushpakumara 25 (45); Nimesh Vimukthi 5/10 (4 overs)

Chilaw Marians Cricket Club won by 111 runs
Burgher Recreation Club Ground, Colombo
Umpires: Kapil Kottahachchi and Nilan De Silva

- Police Sports Club won the toss and elected to field.
- Dilshan Abeysinghe (Chilaw Marians Cricket Club) made his T20 debut.

21 February 2019
Scorecard

Colombo Cricket Club; 136/8 (20 overs)	v	Colts Cricket Club; 93 (16.2 overs)
Manelker De Silva 46* (26); Kavishka Anjula 3/32 (4 overs)		Nisala Tharaka 45 (43); Malinda Pushpakumara 3/21 (3.2 overs)

Colombo Cricket Club won by 43 runs
Army Ground, Panagoda
Umpires: Hemantha Boteju and Asanga Jayasooriya

- Colombo Cricket Club won the toss and elected to bat.

21 February 2019
Scorecard

Kalutara Town Club; 122/8 (20 overs)	v	Negombo Cricket Club; 123/5 (19 overs)
M Nimesh 25 (31); Nilanka Sandakan 2/10 (2 overs)		Sahan Arachchige 30* (26); Lakshan Jayasinghe 2/15 (4 overs)

Negombo Cricket Club won by 5 wickets
Burgher Recreation Club Ground, Colombo
Umpires: Kapil Kottahachchi and Nilan De Silva

- Kalutara Town Club won the toss and elected to bat.
- Ashen Perera (Negombo Cricket Club) made his T20 debut.

==== Group C ====
15 February 2019
Scorecard

Ragama Cricket Club; 152 (20 overs)	v	Sri Lanka Navy Sports Club; 155/6 (19.3 overs)
Janith Liyanage 55 (39); Sathik Nimalsha 4/28 (4 overs)		Dilan Chandima 44 (40); Ishan Jayaratne 2/16 (4 overs)

Sri Lanka Navy Sports Club won by 4 wickets
FTZ Sports Complex, Katunayake
Umpires: Prageeth Rambukwella and Keerthi Bandara

- Sri Lanka Navy Sports Club won the toss and elected to field.
- Revan Kelly, Salitha Fernando and Charuka Wijelath (Sri Lanka Navy Sports Club) all made their T20 debuts.

15 February 2019
Scorecard

Sri Lanka Ports Authority Cricket Club; 157 (20 overs)	v	Sri Lanka Air Force Sports Club; 139 (19.3 overs)
Yohan Chanuka 62 (43); Umega Chaturanga 4/30 (4 overs)		Ravindu Sembukuttige 50 (36); Hashan Vimarshana 3/26 (4 overs)

Sri Lanka Ports Authority Cricket Club won by 18 runs
Colts Cricket Club Ground, Colombo
Umpires: Deepal Gunawardene and Nilan De Silva

- Sri Lanka Air Force Sports Club won the toss and elected to field.
- Suminda Lakshan (Sri Lanka Air Force Sports Club) made his T20 debut.

15 February 2019
Scorecard

Sri Lanka Army Sports Club; 130 (19.1 overs)	v	Kurunegala Youth Cricket Club; 104 (17.1 overs)
Sanjika Ridma 34 (22); Dinushka Malan 4/18 (4 overs)		Dhanushka Dharmasiri 30 (27); Dushan Vimukthi 4/21 (4 overs)

Sri Lanka Army Sports Club won by 26 runs
FTZ Sports Complex, Katunayake
Umpires: Prageeth Rambukwella and Keerthi Bandara

- Sri Lanka Army Sports Club won the toss and elected to bat.
- Kaweesh Kumara, Sanjeew Coomaraswamy (Sri Lanka Army Sports Club) and Randeera Ranasinghe (Kurunegala Youth Cricket Club) all made their T20 debuts.

16 February 2019
Scorecard

Sri Lanka Air Force Sports Club; 176/6 (20 overs)	v	Kurunegala Youth Cricket Club; 127 (18.5 overs)
Udayawansha Parakrama 46 (36); Anurudda Rajapakse 3/37 (4 overs)		Sameera Sadamal 50 (38); Umega Chaturanga 4/10 (3 overs)

Sri Lanka Air Force Sports Club won by 49 runs
FTZ Sports Complex, Katunayake
Umpires: Deepal Gunawardene and Pradeep Udawatta

- Kurunegala Youth Cricket Club won the toss and elected to field.
- Dulaj Ranatunga and Keshan Wanniarachchi (Kurunegala Youth Cricket Club) both made their T20 debuts.

16 February 2019
Scorecard

Sri Lanka Army Sports Club; 156/8 (20 overs)	v	Sri Lanka Navy Sports Club; 66 (13.2 overs)
Ashan Randika 33 (18); Sathik Nimalsha 2/18 (4 overs)		Salitha Fernando 16 (17); Seekkuge Prasanna 3/19 (4 overs)

Sri Lanka Army Sports Club won by 90 runs
Bloomfield Cricket and Athletic Club Ground, Colombo
Umpires: Hemantha Boteju and Ravindra Kottahachchi

- Sri Lanka Navy Sports Club won the toss and elected to field.
- Yasoda Mendis (Sri Lanka Army Sports Club) made his T20 debut.

16 February 2019
Scorecard

Sri Lanka Ports Authority Cricket Club; 163/8 (20 overs)	v	Ragama Cricket Club; 164/8 (20 overs)
Adeesha Nanayakkara 65 (44); Janith Liyanage 2/12 (2 overs)		Supeshala Jayathilake 68 (52); Hashan Vimarshana 3/28 (4 overs)

Ragama Cricket Club won by 2 wickets
Bloomfield Cricket and Athletic Club Ground, Colombo
Umpires: Hemantha Boteju and Ravindra Kottahachchi

- Sri Lanka Ports Authority Cricket Club won the toss and elected to bat.

18 February 2019
Scorecard

Sri Lanka Ports Authority Cricket Club; 99 (19.3 overs)	v	Sri Lanka Army Sports Club; 103/5 (12.5 overs)
Yohan Chanuka 26 (19); Janith Silva 3/19 (2.3 overs)		Seekkuge Prasanna 41* (20); Poorna de Silva 2/30 (2.5 overs)

Sri Lanka Army Sports Club won by 5 wickets
Burgher Recreation Club Ground, Colombo
Umpires: Prageeth Rambukwella and Nilan De Silva

- Sri Lanka Army Sports Club won the toss and elected to field.
- Poorna de Silva (Sri Lanka Ports Authority Cricket Club) made his T20 debut.

18 February 2019
Scorecard

Sri Lanka Navy Sports Club; 158/7 (20 overs)	v	Kurunegala Youth Cricket Club; 162/5 (19.2 overs)
Tharushan Iddamalgoda 39 (19); Chandima Vijayabandara 2/19 (3 overs)		Randeera Ranasinghe 50 (34); Buddika Madushan 2/27 (3 overs)

Kurunegala Youth Cricket Club won by 5 wickets
Colombo Cricket Club Ground, Colombo
Umpires: Asanga Jayasooriya and Keerthi Bandara

- Sri Lanka Navy Sports Club won the toss and elected to bat.
- Kavika Dilshan (Sri Lanka Navy Sports Club) made his T20 debut.

18 February 2019
Scorecard

Ragama Cricket Club; 152/8 (20 overs)	v	Sri Lanka Air Force Sports Club; 104 (19.1 overs)
Roshen Silva 42 (42); Sampath Perera 2/18 (3 overs)		Ravindu Sembukuttige 25 (16); Janith Liyanage 2/7 (2 overs)

Ragama Cricket Club won by 48 runs
Burgher Recreation Club Ground, Colombo
Umpires: Prageeth Rambukwella and Nilan De Silva

- Ragama Cricket Club won the toss and elected to bat.
- Shehan Sandaruwan, Saminda Fernando (Ragama Cricket Club) and Lahiru Kumara (Sri Lanka Air Force Sports Club) all made their T20 debuts.

19 February 2019
Scorecard

Sri Lanka Air Force Sports Club; 153/5 (20 overs)	v	Sri Lanka Army Sports Club; 154/2 (16.1 overs)
Roscoe Thattil 52* (40); Janaka Sampath 2/21 (4 overs)		Asela Gunaratne 54* (37); Roscoe Thattil 1/26 (3 overs)

Sri Lanka Army Sports Club won by 8 wickets
Burgher Recreation Club Ground, Colombo
Umpires: Hemantha Boteju and Nilan De Silva

- Sri Lanka Army Sports Club won the toss and elected to field.

19 February 2019
Scorecard

Sri Lanka Navy Sports Club; 150 (19.3 overs)	v	Sri Lanka Ports Authority Cricket Club; 107 (18 overs)
Salitha Fernando 40 (27); Ranesh Perera 3/24 (4 overs)		Primosh Perera 56 (41); Dushan Hemantha 3/9 (3 overs)

Sri Lanka Navy Sports Club won by 43 runs
Sri Lanka Army Ordnance Corps International Cricket Stadium, Horana
Umpires: Kapil Kottahachchi and Raveendra Wimalasiri

- Sri Lanka Ports Authority Cricket Club won the toss and elected to field.

19 February 2019
Scorecard

Ragama Cricket Club; 184/8 (20 overs)	v	Kurunegala Youth Cricket Club; 111 (14.3 overs)
Shehan Fernando 90 (44); Chandima Vijayabandara 3/21 (4 overs)		Sameera Sadamal 60 (28); Sahan Nanayakkare 5/24 (4 overs)

Ragama Cricket Club won by 73 runs
Burgher Recreation Club Ground, Colombo
Umpires: Hemantha Boteju and Nilan De Silva

- Ragama Cricket Club won the toss and elected to bat.

21 February 2019
Scorecard

Ragama Cricket Club; 160/7 (20 overs)	v	Sri Lanka Army Sports Club; 150 (18.3 overs)
Shehan Fernando 72 (46); Janith Silva 2/24 (4 overs)		Seekkuge Prasanna 76* (30); Ishan Jayaratne 3/28 (4 overs)

Ragama Cricket Club won by 10 runs
FTZ Sports Complex, Katunayake
Umpires: Ranganath Prasanna and Lyndon Hannibal

- Sri Lanka Army Sports Club won the toss and elected to field.

21 February 2019
Scorecard

Sri Lanka Ports Authority Cricket Club; 142/6 (20 overs)	v	Kurunegala Youth Cricket Club; 145/9 (19.4 overs)
Primosh Perera 39 (37); Lahiru Jayaratne 2/8 (1 over)		Dhanushka Dharmasiri 67 (50); Sehan Nissanka 3/31 (4 overs)

Kurunegala Youth Cricket Club won by 1 wicket
Colombo Cricket Club Ground, Colombo
Umpires: Rohitha Kottahachchi and Deepal Gunawardene

- Sri Lanka Ports Authority Cricket Club won the toss and elected to bat.
- Sehan Nissanka (Sri Lanka Ports Authority Cricket Club) made his T20 debut.

21 February 2019
Scorecard

Sri Lanka Air Force Sports Club; 135/6 (20 overs)	v	Sri Lanka Navy Sports Club; 120 (18.4 overs)
Ravindu Sembukuttige 38 (29); Dilan Chandima 2/27 (4 overs)		Tharushan Iddamalgoda 34 (29); Sampath Perera 4/17 (4 overs)

Sri Lanka Air Force Sports Club won by 15 runs
FTZ Sports Complex, Katunayake
Umpires: Ranganath Prasanna and Lyndon Hannibal

- Sri Lanka Air Force Sports Club won the toss and elected to bat.
- Ravin Tharindu (Sri Lanka Navy Sports Club) made his T20 debut.

==== Group D ====
15 February 2019
Scorecard

Lankan Cricket Club; 125/8 (20 overs)	v	Badureliya Sports Club; 129/6 (18.2 overs)
S Kankanange 25 (19); Nuwan Thushara 3/22 (4 overs)		Shiran Ratnayake 24* (21); Dulanjana Mendis 4/17 (4 overs)

Badureliya won by 4 wickets
Army Ground, Panagoda
Umpires: Rohitha Kottahachchi and Pradeep Udawatta

- Badureliya Sports Club won the toss and elected to field.
- Pathum Madusanka (Badureliya Sports Club), Lahiru Dilshan, S Kankanange, T Rodrigo and Chandula Weeraratne (Lankan Cricket Club) all made their T20 debuts.

15 February 2019
Scorecard

Burgher Recreation Club; 83 (16.2 overs)	v	Galle Cricket Club; 87/2 (11.5 overs)
Rumesh Buddika 25 (20); Gayan Sirisoma 3/22 (3.2 over)		Lakshan Rodrigo 58 (34); Vikum Sanjaya 1/16 (3 overs)

Galle Cricket Club won by 8 wickets
Army Ground, Panagoda

- Burgher Recreation Club won the toss and elected to bat.
- Duvindu Tillakaratne (Burgher Recreation Club), Ashan Madushanka, Kevin Koththigoda and A Warnakulasuriya (Galle Cricket Club) all made their T20 debuts.

15 February 2019
Scorecard

Tamil Union Cricket and Athletic Club; 160/9 (20 overs)	v	Kandy Customs Cricket Club; 95 (16.2 overs)
Jeevan Mendis 35 (34); Ramith Rambukwella 3/8 (2.2 overs)		Tharaka Waduge 41 (38); Ramith Rambukwella 3/8 (2.2 overs)

Tamil Union Cricket and Athletic Club won by 65 runs
Colts Cricket Club Ground, Colombo
Umpires: Deepal Gunawardene and Nilan De Silva

- Tamil Union Cricket and Athletic Club won the toss and elected to bat.
- Damitha Silva (Tamil Union Cricket and Athletic Club), Nimnaka Ratnayake, Ravishka Wijesiri, Buddika Prasad, Shehan Hirudika, H Hennanayake, C Fernando, Dilan Suraweera, N Peiris and L Perera (Kandy Customs Cricket Club) all made their T20 debuts.

16 February 2019
Scorecard

Galle Cricket Club; 147/6 (20 overs)	v	Badureliya Sports Club; 83 (16.3 overs)
Harsha Vithana 42 (29); Nuwan Thushara 2/21 (4 overs)		Dilhan Cooray 20 (20); Lakshan Rodrigo 4/12 (3 overs)

Galle Cricket Club won by 64 runs
Colombo Cricket Club Ground, Colombo
Umpires: Lyndon Hannibal and Nilan De Silva

- Badureliya Sports Club won the toss and elected to field.

16 February 2019
Scorecard

Tamil Union Cricket and Athletic Club; 178/8 (20 overs)	v	Lankan Cricket Club; 171/7 (20 overs)
Kithuruwan Vithanage 58 (38); Geeth Kumara 2/30 (4 overs)		S Kankanange 55* (38); Jeevan Mendis 2/31 (4 overs)

Tamil Union Cricket and Athletic Club won by 7 runs
FTZ Sports Complex, Katunayake
Umpires: Deepal Gunawardene and Pradeep Udawatta

- Tamil Union Cricket and Athletic Club won the toss and elected to bat.
- Ayantha de Silva and Chanaka Devinda (Lankan Cricket Club) both made their T20 debuts.

16 February 2019
Scorecard

Kandy Customs Cricket Club; 65 (16.5 overs)	v	Burgher Recreation Club; 68/4 (8.3 overs)
Dilan Suraweera 15 (12); Bhanuka Rajapaksa 3/18 (4 overs)		Lasith Lakshan 26 (22); Sumedha Dissanayake 2/8 (2 overs)

Burgher Recreation Club won by 6 wickets
Colombo Cricket Club Ground, Colombo
Umpires: Lyndon Hannibal and Nilan De Silva

- Burgher Recreation Club won the toss and elected to bat.
- Vittorio Roberto, Sumedha Dissanayake and S Sankalpa (Kandy Customs Cricket Club) all made their T20 debuts.

18 February 2019
Scorecard

Tamil Union Cricket and Athletic Club; 206/4 (20 overs)	v	Galle Cricket Club; 145/6 (20 overs)
Lahiru Milantha 54 (33); Kevin Koththigoda 3/25 (4 overs)		Harsha Vithana 58* (40); Damitha Silva 3/35 (4 overs)

Tamil Union Cricket and Athletic Club won by 61 runs
Colombo Cricket Club Ground, Colombo
Umpires: Asanga Jayasooriya and Keerthi Bandara

- Galle Cricket Club won the toss and elected to field.
- Bawantha Udangamuwa (Galle Cricket Club) made his T20 debut.

18 February 2019
Scorecard

Badureliya Sports Club; 137 (19.2 overs)	v	Burgher Recreation Club; 141/6 (17 overs)
Denuwan Rajakaruna 46 (37); Bhanuka Rajapaksa 3/34 (4 overs)		Bhanuka Rajapaksa 71* (41); Nuwan Thushara 3/34 (4 overs)

Burgher Recreation Club won by 4 wickets
Sri Lanka Army Ordnance Corps International Cricket Stadium, Horana
Umpires: Ravindra Kottahachchi and Deepal Gunawardene

- Burgher Recreation Club won the toss and elected to field.
- Nuwanidu Fernando (Badureliya Sports Club) made his T20 debut.

18 February 2019
Scorecard

Lankan Cricket Club; 203/3 (20 overs)	v	Kandy Customs Cricket Club; 108/8 (20 overs)
Maduranga Zoysa 76* (49); Nimnaka Ratnayake 1/18 (3 overs)		Buddika Prasad 35 (32); Shifran Muthaliph 3/28 (4 overs)

Lankan Cricket Club won by 95 runs
Sri Lanka Army Ordnance Corps International Cricket Stadium, Horana
Umpires: Ravindra Kottahachchi and Deepal Gunawardene

- Kandy Customs Cricket Club won the toss and elected to field.
- Shifran Muthaliph (Lankan Cricket Club), Kalum Nanayakkara, Kavinda Manamperi and Gihan De Zoysa (Kandy Customs Cricket Club) all made their T20 debuts.

19 February 2019
Scorecard

Badureliya Sports Club; 159/8 (20 overs)	v	Kandy Customs Cricket Club; 122 (19.2 overs)
Alankara Asanka Silva 43 (28); Nimnaka Ratnayake 4/25 (4 overs)		Tharaka Waduge 24 (26); Buddika Sanjeewa 4/22 (4 overs)

Badureliya won by 37 runs
Colombo Cricket Club Ground, Colombo
Umpires: Deepal Gunawardene and Pradeep Udawatta

- Kandy Customs Cricket Club won the toss and elected to field.
- Gagul Ravin (Badureliya Sports Club) and Ravindu Thiwanka (Kandy Customs Cricket Club) both made their T20 debuts.

19 February 2019
Scorecard

Burgher Recreation Club; 187/5 (20 overs)	v	Tamil Union Cricket and Athletic Club; 191/5 (18.5 overs)
Rumesh Buddika 93 (58); Sachithra Serasinghe 2/23 (4 overs)		Manoj Sarathchandra 70* (33); Rumesh Buddika 2/14 (2 overs)

Tamil Union Cricket and Athletic Club won by 5 wickets
Sri Lanka Army Ordnance Corps International Cricket Stadium, Horana
Umpires: Kapil Kottahachchi and Raveendra Wimalasiri

- Burgher Recreation Club won the toss and elected to bat.

19 February 2019
Scorecard

Lankan Cricket Club; 164/6 (20 overs)	v	Galle Cricket Club; 165/4 (18.3 overs)
Chanaka Ruwansiri 63 (34); Rajeewa Weerasinghe 1/13 (2 overs)		Nisal Randika 54 (37); Poorna Charuka 2/17 (3 overs)

Galle Cricket Club won by 6 wickets
Colombo Cricket Club Ground, Colombo
Umpires: Deepal Gunawardene and Pradeep Udawatta

- Galle Cricket Club won the toss and elected to field.

21 February 2019
Scorecard

Galle Cricket Club; 181/5 (20 overs)	v	Kandy Customs Cricket Club; 168/9 (20 overs)
Sameen Kandanearachchi 91 (57); Sumedha Dissanayake 2/35 (3 overs)		Ravishka Wijesiri 54 (38); Gayan Sirisoma 3/36 (4 overs)

Galle Cricket Club won by 13 runs
Bloomfield Cricket and Athletic Club Ground, Colombo
Umpires: Ravindra Kottahachchi and Raveendra Wimalasiri

- Galle Cricket Club won the toss and elected to bat.
- Mohamed Wagas (Kandy Customs Cricket Club) made his T20 debut.

21 February 2019
Scorecard

Tamil Union Cricket and Athletic Club; 175 (20 overs)	v	Badureliya Sports Club; 153 (17.5 overs)
Jeevan Mendis 53 (28); Nadeera Nawela 3/38 (3 overs)		Lahiru Samarakoon 99 (43); Sachithra Serasinghe 3/38 (4 overs)

Tamil Union Cricket and Athletic Club won by 22 runs
Colombo Cricket Club Ground, Colombo
Umpires: Rohitha Kottahachchi and Deepal Gunawardene

- Tamil Union Cricket and Athletic Club won the toss and elected to bat.
- Thilanga Udeshana (Tamil Union Cricket and Athletic Club) and Yomesh Ranasinghe (Badureliya Sports Club) both made their T20 debuts.

21 February 2019
Scorecard

Lankan Cricket Club; 164/8 (20 overs)	v	Burgher Recreation Club; 120/9 (20 overs)
Maduranga Zoysa 72 (47); Vikum Sanjaya 2/26 (4 overs)		Bhanuka Rajapaksa 24 (17 overs); Geeth Kumara 3/12 (4 overs)

Lankan Cricket Club won by 44 runs
Bloomfield Cricket and Athletic Club Ground, Colombo
Umpires: Ravindra Kottahachchi and Raveendra Wimalasiri

- Lankan Cricket Club won the toss and elected to bat.
- Hiruna Sigera and Chathura Somathillake (Lankan Cricket Club) both made their T20 debuts.

=== Knockout stage ===
==== Quarterfinals ====
1st Quarterfinal
23 February 2019
Scorecard

Galle Cricket Club; 131/9 (20 overs)	v	Moors Sports Club; 132/6 (18.4 overs)
Sameen Kandanearachchi 43 (36); Shiran Fernando 3/25 (4 overs)		Chamara Silva 39 (24); Rajeewa Weerasinghe 2/21 (4 overs)

Moors Sports Club won by 4 wickets
Colts Cricket Club Ground, Colombo
Umpires: Asanga Jayasooriya and Raveendra Wimalasiri

- Moors Sports Club won the toss and elected to field.

2nd Quarterfinal
23 February 2019
Scorecard

Sri Lanka Army Sports Club; 173/8 (20 overs)	v	Chilaw Marians Cricket Club; 122 (15.4 overs)
Seekkuge Prasanna 61 (29); Thikshila de Silva 3/35 (4 overs)		Thikshila de Silva 38 (19); Janaka Sampath 3/14 (1.4 overs)

Sri Lanka Army Sports Club won by 51 runs
Nondescripts Cricket Club Ground, Colombo
Umpires: Hemantha Boteju and Prageeth Rambukwella

- Chilaw Marians Cricket Club won the toss and elected to field.
- Dilshan Sanjeewa (Chilaw Marians Cricket Club) made his T20 debut.

3rd Quarterfinal
23 February 2019
Scorecard

Colombo Cricket Club; 160/6 (20 overs)	v	Ragama Cricket Club; 160/8 (20 overs)
Madawa Warnapura 36 (31); Nishan Peiris 2/28 (4 overs)		Janith Liyanage 41 (22); Malinda Pushpakumara 2/37 (4 overs)

Match tied
(Colombo Cricket Club won the Super Over)
Nondescripts Cricket Club Ground, Colombo
Umpires: Hemantha Boteju and Prageeth Rambukwella

- Ragama Cricket Club won the toss and elected to field.

4th Quarterfinal
23 February 2019
Scorecard

Nondescripts Cricket Club; 184/7 (20 overs)	v	Tamil Union Cricket and Athletic Club; 139 (16.3 overs)
Lahiru Udara 94 (57); Pramod Madushan 3/25 (4 overs)		Lahiru Milantha 61 (40); Chaturanga de Silva 3/12 (1.3 overs)

Nondescripts Cricket Club won by 45 runs
Colts Cricket Club Ground, Colombo
Umpires: Asanga Jayasooriya and Raveendra Wimalasiri

- Nondescripts Cricket Club won the toss and elected to bat.
- Sadish Pathiranage (Tamil Union Cricket and Athletic Club) and Venura Gayashan (Nondescripts Cricket Club) both made their T20 debuts.

==== Finals ====
1st Semi-final
25 February 2019
Scorecard

Sri Lanka Army Sports Club; 186/6 (20 overs)	v	Moors Sports Club; 190/4 (17.1 overs)
Ashan Randika 117 (59); Ayana Siriwardhana 1/14 (3 overs)		Nimanda Madushanka 46* (17); Sanjika Ridma 1/6 (1 over)

Moors Sports Club won by 6 wickets
P Sara Oval, Colombo
Umpires: Lyndon Hannibal and Nilan De Silva

- Moors Sports Club won the toss and elected to field.

2nd Semi-final
25 February 2019
Scorecard

Nondescripts Cricket Club; 142/9 (20 overs)	v	Colombo Cricket Club; 141/9 (20 overs)
Mahela Udawatte 48 (42); Ashan Priyanjan 2/18 (4 overs)		Wanindu Hasaranga 38 (27); Saranga Rajaguru 3/24 (4 overs)

Nondescripts Cricket Club won by 1 run
P Sara Oval, Colombo
Umpires: Ravindra Kottahachchi and Deepal Gunawardene

- Nondescripts Cricket Club won the toss and elected to bat.

Final
27 February 2019
Scorecard

Nondescripts Cricket Club; 173/7 (20 overs)	v	Moors Sports Club; 174/9 (20 overs)
Pathum Nissanka 52 (38); Adeesha Thilanchana 3/30 (4 overs)		Nimanda Madushanka 47 (23); Dilesh Gunaratne 3/18 (4 overs)

Moors Sports Club won by 1 wicket
P Sara Oval, Colombo
Umpires: Raveendra Wimalasiri and Lyndon Hannibal

- Moors Sports Club won the toss and elected to field.
