= Charuka =

Charuka is both a given name and a surname. Notable people with the name include:

- Charuka Kahagalla (born 1988), Sri Lankan cricketer.
- Charuka Tharindu (born 2001), Sri Lankan cricketer.
- Charuka Wijelath (born 1992), Sri Lankan cricketer.
- Poorna Charuka (born 1997), Sri Lankan cricketer.
