= Dilan Suraweera =

Sri Lankan cricketer (born 1997)

Personal information
- Born: 31 August 1997 (age 29)
- Source: ESPNcricinfo, 4 March 2019

Dilan Suraweera (born 31 August 1997) is a Sri Lankan cricketer. He made his Twenty20 debut for Kandy Customs Cricket Club in the 2018–19 SLC Twenty20 Tournament on 15 February 2019. He made his List A debut for Kandy Customs Cricket Club in the 2018–19 Premier Limited Overs Tournament on 4 March 2019.
