= Vittorio Roberto =

Sri Lankan cricketer (born 1997)

Personal information
- Born: 24 June 1997 (age 29)
- Source: Cricinfo, 16 February 2019

Vittorio Roberto (born 24 June 1997) is a Sri Lankan cricketer. He made his Twenty20 debut for Kandy Customs Cricket Club in the 2018–19 SLC Twenty20 Tournament on 16 February 2019. He made his List A debut for Kandy Customs Cricket Club in the 2018–19 Premier Limited Overs Tournament on 10 March 2019.
