= Shehan Hirudika =

Sri Lankan cricketer (born 1990)

Personal information
- Born: 28 January 1990 (age 36)
- Source: ESPNcricinfo, 4 March 2019

Shehan Hirudika (born 28 January 1990) is a Sri Lankan cricketer. He made his Twenty20 debut for Kandy Customs Cricket Club in the 2018–19 SLC Twenty20 Tournament on 15 February 2019. He made his List A debut for Kandy Customs Cricket Club in the 2018–19 Premier Limited Overs Tournament on 4 March 2019.
