= Ravishka Wijesiri =

Sri Lankan cricketer (born 2000)

Personal information
- Born: 1 January 2000 (age 26)
- Source: Cricinfo, 6 January 2020

Ravishka Wijesiri (born 1 January 2000) is a Sri Lankan cricketer. He made his Twenty20 debut for Kandy Customs Cricket Club in the 2018–19 SLC Twenty20 Tournament on 15 February 2019. He made his List A debut for Kandy Customs Cricket Club in the 2018–19 Premier Limited Overs Tournament on 4 March 2019. He made his first-class debut on 31 January 2020, for Galle Cricket Club in Tier B of the 2019–20 Premier League Tournament.
