= Attanayake =

Attanayake is a Sinhalese surname. Notable people with the surname include:

- Lahiru Attanayake (born 1999), Sri Lankan cricketer
- Manike Attanayake (born 1947), Sri Lankan actress
- Senarath Attanayake (1966–2017), Sri Lankan politician
- Tissa Attanayake (born 1961), Sri Lankan politician
