= Sumedha Dissanayake =

Sri Lankan cricketer (born 1995)

Personal information
- Born: 12 February 1995 (age 31)
- Source: ESPNcricinfo, 4 March 2019

Sumedha Dissanayake (born 12 February 1995) is a Sri Lankan cricketer. He made his Twenty20 debut for Kandy Customs Cricket Club in the 2018–19 SLC Twenty20 Tournament on 16 February 2019. He made his List A debut for Kandy Customs Cricket Club in the 2018–19 Premier Limited Overs Tournament on 4 March 2019.
