= Gihan de Zoysa =

Sri Lankan cricketer (born 1997)

Personal information
- Born: 1 May 1997 (age 29); Kegalle, Sri Lanka
- Source: Cricinfo, 18 February 2019

Gihan de Zoysa (born 1 May 1997) is a Sri Lankan cricketer. He made his Twenty20 debut for Kandy Customs Cricket Club in the 2018–19 SLC Twenty20 Tournament on 18 February 2019. He made his List A debut for Kandy Customs Cricket Club in the 2018–19 Premier Limited Overs Tournament on 12 March 2019.
