= Koththigoda =

Koththigoda is a surname. Notable people with the surname include:

- Kevin Koththigoda (born 1998), Sri Lankan cricketer
- Yuri Koththigoda, Sri Lankan cricketer
