= Vimukthi Umagiliyage =

Sri Lankan cricketer (born 1992)

Personal information
- Born: 13 August 1992 (age 34)
- Source: ESPNcricinfo, 4 March 2019

Vimukthi Umagiliyage (born 13 August 1992) is a Sri Lankan cricketer. He made his List A debut for Kandy Customs Cricket Club in the 2018–19 Premier Limited Overs Tournament on 4 March 2019.
