= Jayanga Peiris =

Sri Lankan cricketer (born 1995)

Personal information
- Born: 6 September 1995 (age 31)
- Source: Cricinfo, 16 February 2019

Jayanga Peiris (born 6 September 1995) is a Sri Lankan cricketer. He made his Twenty20 debut for Panadura Sports Club in the 2018–19 SLC Twenty20 Tournament on 16 February 2019.
