= Revan Kelly =

Sri Lankan cricketer (born 1999)

Personal information
- Born: 9 March 1999 (age 27)
- Source: Cricinfo, 15 February 2019

Revan Kelly (born 9 March 1999) is a Sri Lankan cricketer. He made his first-class debut for Sri Lanka Navy Sports Club in Tier B of the 2018–19 Premier League Tournament on 31 January 2019. He made his Twenty20 debut for Sri Lanka Navy Sports Club in the 2018–19 SLC Twenty20 Tournament on 15 February 2019. He made his List A debut for Sri Lanka Navy Sports Club in the 2018–19 Premier Limited Overs Tournament on 4 March 2019.
