= Asantha Basnayake =

Sri Lankan cricketer (born 1987)

Personal information
- Born: 1 April 1987 (age 39); Nikawewa, Sri Lanka
- Batting: Left-handed
- Bowling: Right-arm medium-fast
- Source: Cricinfo, 15 February 2019

Asantha Basnayake (born 1 April 1987) is a Sri Lankan cricketer. He made his first-class debut for Panadura Sports Club in Tier B of the 2018–19 Premier League Tournament on 1 February 2019. He made his Twenty20 debut for Panadura Sports Club in the 2018–19 SLC Twenty20 Tournament on 15 February 2019. He made his List A debut for Panadura Sports Club in the 2018–19 Premier Limited Overs Tournament on 4 March 2019.
