= Ranitha Liyanarachchi =

Sri Lankan cricketer (born 1994)

Personal information
- Born: 19 June 1994 (age 32); Colombo, Sri Lanka
- Source: Cricinfo, 9 April 2017

Ranitha Liyanarachchi (born 19 June 1994) is a Sri Lankan cricketer. He made his List A debut for Colombo District in the 2016–17 Districts One Day Tournament on 22 March 2017. He made his Twenty20 debut for Saracens Sports Club in the 2018–19 SLC Twenty20 Tournament on 15 February 2019.
