= Thilanga Udeshana =

Sri Lankan cricketer (born 1998)

Personal information
- Full name: Hamaragoda Kuruppuge Tilanga Udeshana
- Born: 13 March 1998 (age 28); Galle, Sri Lanka
- Source: Cricinfo, 9 December 2017

Thilanga Udeshana (born 13 March 1998) is a Sri Lankan cricketer. He made his first-class debut for Tamil Union Cricket and Athletic Club in the 2017–18 Premier League Tournament on 8 December 2017. He made his Twenty20 debut for Tamil Union Cricket and Athletic Club in the 2018–19 SLC Twenty20 Tournament on 21 February 2019. He made his List A debut for Tamil Union Cricket and Athletic Club in the 2018–19 Premier Limited Overs Tournament on 12 March 2019.
