= Chathura Obeyesekere =

Sri Lankan cricketer (born 1998)

Personal information
- Born: 27 February 1998 (age 28)
- Source: Cricinfo, 16 February 2019

Chathura Obeyesekere (born 27 February 1998) is a Sri Lankan cricketer. He made his Twenty20 debut for Bloomfield Cricket and Athletic Club in the 2018–19 SLC Twenty20 Tournament on 16 February 2019. He made his List A debut for Bloomfield Cricket and Athletic Club in the 2018–19 Premier Limited Overs Tournament on 12 March 2019. He made his first-class debut on 8 February 2020, for Bloomfield Cricket and Athletic Club in Tier B of the 2019–20 Premier League Tournament.
