= Dileepa Jayalath =

Sri Lankan cricketer (born 1997)

Personal information
- Born: 7 September 1997 (age 29)
- Source: Cricinfo, 15 February 2019

Dileepa Jayalath (born 7 September 1997) is a Sri Lankan cricketer. He made his Twenty20 debut for Bloomfield Cricket and Athletic Club in the 2018–19 SLC Twenty20 Tournament on 15 February 2019. He made his List A debut for Bloomfield Cricket and Athletic Club in the 2018–19 Premier Limited Overs Tournament on 10 March 2019. He made his first-class debut for Bloomfield Cricket and Athletic Club in Tier B of the 2018–19 Premier League Tournament on 22 March 2019.
