= Malinga Amarasinghe =

Sri Lankan cricketer (born 1997)

Personal information
- Full name: Amarasinghe Mudiyanselage Eranda Malinga Amarasinghe
- Born: 19 October 1997 (age 29); Colombo, Sri Lanka
- Source: Cricinfo, 8 April 2017

Malinga Amarasinghe (born 19 October 1997) is a Sri Lankan cricketer. He made his List A debut for Matara District in the 2016–17 Districts One Day Tournament on 22 March 2017. He made his first-class debut for Nondescripts Cricket Club in the 2017–18 Premier League Tournament on 8 December 2017. He made his Twenty20 debut for Nondescripts Cricket Club in the 2018–19 SLC Twenty20 Tournament on 18 February 2019. Malinga was educated at Nalanda College, Colombo.
