= Niroshana Amarasinghe =

Sri Lankan cricketer (born 1982)

Personal information
- Born: 26 September 1982 (age 44); Colombo, Sri Lanka
- Source: Cricinfo, 6 March 2019

Niroshana Amarasinghe (born 26 September 1982) is a Sri Lankan former cricketer who played in 33 first-class and 22 List A matches between 2001 and 2011. He made his Twenty20 debut on 17 August 2004, for Tamil Union Cricket and Athletic Club in the 2004 SLC Twenty20 Tournament. He is now an umpire, and has stood in matches in the 2018–19 Premier Limited Overs Tournament.
