= Kaweesh Kumara =

Sri Lankan cricketer (born 1998)

Personal information
- Born: 10 February 1998 (age 28)
- Source: Cricinfo, 15 February 2019

Kaweesh Kumara (born 10 February 1998) is a Sri Lankan cricketer. He made his Twenty20 debut for Sri Lanka Army Sports Club in the 2018–19 SLC Twenty20 Tournament on 15 February 2019. He made his List A debut for Sri Lanka Army Sports Club in the 2018–19 Premier Limited Overs Tournament on 4 March 2019.
