= Shifran Muthaliph =

Sri Lankan cricketer (born 1996)

Personal information
- Born: 2 July 1996 (age 30)
- Source: Cricinfo, 18 February 2019

Shifran Muthaliph (born 2 July 1996) is a Sri Lankan cricketer. He made his first-class debut for Lankan Cricket Club in Tier B of the 2018–19 Premier League Tournament on 31 January 2019. He made his Twenty20 debut for Lankan Cricket Club in the 2018–19 SLC Twenty20 Tournament on 18 February 2019. He made his List A debut for Lankan Cricket Club in the 2018–19 Premier Limited Overs Tournament on 4 March 2019.
