= Tharindu Karunaratne =

Sri Lankan cricketer (born 1994)

Personal information
- Born: 1 September 1994 (age 32); Sri Jayawardenepura Kotte, Sri Lanka
- Source: ESPNcricinfo, 9 December 2016

Tharindu Karunaratne (born 1 September 1994) is a Sri Lankan cricketer. He made his first-class debut for Bloomfield Cricket and Athletic Club in the 2016–17 Premier League Tournament on 9 December 2016. He made his Twenty20 debut for Bloomfield Cricket and Athletic Club in the 2018–19 SLC Twenty20 Tournament on 15 February 2019. He made his List A debut for Bloomfield Cricket and Athletic Club in the 2018–19 Premier Limited Overs Tournament on 4 March 2019.
