= Asel Sigera =

Sri Lankan cricketer (born 1999)

Personal information
- Born: 21 May 1999 (age 27)
- Source: Cricinfo, 15 February 2019

Asel Sigera (born 21 May 1999) is a Sri Lankan cricketer. He made his first-class debut for Bloomfield Cricket and Athletic Club in Tier B of the 2018–19 Premier League Tournament on 31 January 2019. He made his Twenty20 debut for Bloomfield Cricket and Athletic Club in the 2018–19 SLC Twenty20 Tournament on 15 February 2019. He made his List A debut for Bloomfield Cricket and Athletic Club in the 2018–19 Premier Limited Overs Tournament on 4 March 2019.
