= Ravindu Gunawardene =

Sri Lankan cricketer (born 1997)

Personal information
- Born: 10 September 1997 (age 29)
- Source: Cricinfo, 12 March 2019

Ravindu Gunawardene (born 10 September 1997) is a Sri Lankan cricketer. He made his List A debut for Sri Lanka Air Force Sports Club in the 2018–19 Premier Limited Overs Tournament on 12 March 2019.
