= Charana Nanayakkara =

Sri Lankan cricketer (born 1997)

Personal information
- Born: 23 November 1997 (age 28)
- Source: Cricinfo, 7 February 2019

Charana Nanayakkara (born 23 November 1997) is a Sri Lankan cricketer. He made his first-class debut for Panadura Sports Club in Tier B of the 2018–19 Premier League Tournament on 1 February 2019. Prior to his first-class debut, he was named in Sri Lanka's squad for the 2016 Under-19 Cricket World Cup. He made his Twenty20 debut for Panadura Sports Club in the 2018–19 SLC Twenty20 Tournament on 15 February 2019. He made his List A debut for Panadura Sports Club in the 2018–19 Premier Limited Overs Tournament on 4 March 2019.
