= Tharusha Fernando =

Sri Lankan cricketer (born 1999)

Personal information
- Full name: Dolamulage Tharusha Manuhara Fernando
- Born: 5 June 1999 (age 27); Moratuwa, Sri Lanka
- Batting: Right-handed
- Bowling: Leg break
- Source: Cricinfo, 15 February 2019

Dolamulage Tharusha Manuhara Fernando (born 5 June 1999) is a Sri Lankan cricketer. He made his Twenty20 debut for Panadura Sports Club in the 2018–19 SLC Twenty20 Tournament on 15 February 2019. He made his List A debut for Panadura Sports Club in the 2018–19 Premier Limited Overs Tournament on 4 March 2019.
