= Thilan Prashan =

Sri Lankan cricketer (born 1998)

Personal information
- Born: 20 November 1998 (age 27); Matara, Sri Lanka
- Source: Cricinfo, 19 February 2019

Thilan Prashan (born 20 November 1998) is a Sri Lankan cricketer. He made his Twenty20 debut for Sinhalese Sports Club in the 2018–19 SLC Twenty20 Tournament on 19 February 2019. Prior to his T20 debut, he was named in Sri Lanka's squad for the 2018 Under-19 Cricket World Cup. He made his List A debut for Sinhalese Sports Club in the 2018–19 Premier Limited Overs Tournament on 10 March 2019. He made his first-class debut on 28 February 2020, for Sinhalese Sports Club in the 2019–20 Premier League Tournament.
