= Nipun Lakshan =

Sri Lankan cricketer (born 1999)

Personal information
- Born: 5 April 1999 (age 27)
- Source: Cricinfo, 15 February 2019

Nipun Lakshan (born 5 April 1999) is a Sri Lankan cricketer. He made his Twenty20 debut for Panadura Sports Club in the 2018–19 SLC Twenty20 Tournament on 15 February 2019. He made his List A debut for Panadura Sports Club in the 2018–19 Premier Limited Overs Tournament on 15 March 2019. He made his first-class debut for Panadura Sports Club in Tier B of the 2018–19 Premier League Tournament on 10 February 2019.
