= Sanath Ranjan =

Sri Lankan cricketer (born 1988)

Personal information
- Born: 18 November 1988 (age 37)
- Source: Cricinfo, 4 April 2017

Sanath Ranjan (born 18 November 1988) is a Sri Lankan cricketer. He made his List A debut for Vauniya District in the 2016–17 Districts One Day Tournament on 19 March 2017. He made his Twenty20 debut for Police Sports Club in the 2018–19 SLC Twenty20 Tournament on 15 February 2019.
