= Dulaj Ranatunga =

Sri Lankan cricketer (born 1999)

Personal information
- Born: 29 March 1999 (age 27)
- Source: Cricinfo, 16 February 2019

Dulaj Ranatunga (born 29 March 1999) is a Sri Lankan cricketer. He made his Twenty20 debut for Kurunegala Youth Cricket Club in the 2018–19 SLC Twenty20 Tournament on 16 February 2019. He made his List A debut for Kurunegala Youth Cricket Club in the 2018–19 Premier Limited Overs Tournament on 10 March 2019.
