= Cricket at the 2019 South Asian Games – Men's tournament =

Men's cricket at the 2019 South Asian Games
- Venue: Tribhuvan University International Cricket Ground
- Date: 3 December 2019 – 9 December 2019
- Nations: 5

Medalists
gold medal	Bangladesh (2nd title)
silver medal	Sri Lanka
bronze medal	Nepal

Men's cricket at the 2019 South Asian Games was held in Kirtipur, Nepal from 3 to 9 December 2019. The men's tournament featured under-23 squads from Bangladesh and Sri Lanka and senior squads from Bhutan, Maldives and Nepal. India and Pakistan did not participate.

The Bangladesh team won the gold medal, after they beat Sri Lanka by seven wickets in the final. In the third-place playoff, Nepal beat the Maldives by five wickets to win bronze.

== Format ==
The five participating nations played matches on a round-robin basis. The top two teams progressed to the final, while the third and fourth sides advanced to the bronze medal match.

== Squads ==
Bangladesh and Sri Lanka sent under-23 squads, although they were each permitted to select up to three older players.

Bangladesh U23	Bhutan	Maldives	Nepal	Sri Lanka U23
Najmul Hossain Shanto (c); Minhajul Abedin Afridi; Yasir Ali; Mahidul Islam Ankon; Mahedi Hasan; Zakir Hasan; Saif Hassan; Afif Hossain; Tanvir Islam; Manik Khan; Sumon Khan; Hasan Mahmud; Mehedi Hasan Rana; Soumya Sarkar; Mohammad Naim	Jigme Singye (c); Namgang Chejay; Sonam Chophel; Jigme Dorji; Karma Dorji; Ugyen Dorji; Ranjung Mikyo Dorji; Thinley Jamtsho; Kinga Loday; Kezang Nima; Tobden Singye; Jigme Thinley; Sonam Tobgay; Tenzin Wangchuk, Jr.	Mohamed Mahfooz (c); Umar Adam; Mohamed Azzam; Azyan Farhath; Ahmed Hassan; Ibrahim Hassan; Nazwan Ismail; Ali Ivan; Ameel Mauroof; Ahmed Raid; Rasheed Rassam; Mohamed Rishwan; Ibrahim Rizan; Leem Shafeeg	Gyanendra Malla (c); Dipendra Singh Airee; Binod Bhandari; Sushan Bhari; Kushal Bhurtel; Abinash Bohara; Sundeep Jora; Sompal Kami; Karan KC; Paras Khadka; Rashid Khan; Rohit Paudel; Lalit Rajbanshi; Pawan Sarraf; Aarif Sheikh	Charith Asalanka (c); Kamindu Mendis (vc); Kavishka Anjula; Shammu Ashan; Ashen Bandara; Hasitha Boyagoda; Vishva Chathuranga; Sachindu Colombage; Lasith Croospulle; Jehan Daniel; Asitha Fernando; Nishan Madushka; Pathum Nissanka; Kalana Perera; Duvindu Tillakaratne

== Round-robin stage ==
=== Points table ===
Pos	Team	Pld	W	L	T	NR	Pts	NRR
1	Sri Lanka U23	4	4	0	0	0	8	4.031
2	Bangladesh U23	4	3	1	0	0	6	3.075
3	Nepal	4	2	2	0	0	4	2.159
4	Maldives	4	1	3	0	0	2	−3.339
5	Bhutan	4	0	4	0	0	0	−6.453

- advanced to the gold medal match
- advanced to the bronze medal match

=== Fixtures ===
3 December 2019
11:00
Scorecard

Nepal; 172/5 (20 overs)	v	Sri Lanka U23; 175/4 (19.1 overs)
Dipendra Singh Airee 72* (44); Kamindu Mendis 2/34 (4 overs)		Shammu Ashan 72* (44); Pawan Sarraf 2/20 (2 overs)

Sri Lanka U23 won by 6 wickets
Tribhuvan University International Cricket Ground, Kirtipur
Umpires: Sanjay Gurung (Nep) and Buddhi Pradhan (Nep)
Player of the match: Shammu Ashan (Sri Lanka U23)

- Sri Lanka U23 won the toss and elected to field.

4 December 2019
09:00
Scorecard

Bangladesh U23; 174/4 (20 overs)	v	Maldives; 65 (19.2 overs)
Najmul Hossain Shanto 49 (38); Ibrahim Hassan 1/31 (4 overs)		Ali Ivan 12 (27); Tanvir Islam 5/19 (4 overs)

Bangladesh U23 won by 109 runs
Tribhuvan University International Cricket Ground, Kirtipur
Umpires: Deepal Gunawardene (SL) and Ram Yadav (Nep)
Player of the match: Tanvir Islam (Bangladesh U23)

- Bangladesh U23 won the toss and elected to bat.

4 December 2019
13:00
Scorecard

Sri Lanka U23; 248/4 (20 overs)	v	Bhutan; 75 (18.4 overs)
Pathum Nissanka 76 (48); Tenzin Wangchuk Jr. 1/16 (1 over)		Ranjung Mikyo Dorji 22 (15); Sachindu Colombage 2/6 (2 overs)

Sri Lanka U23 won by 173 runs
Tribhuvan University International Cricket Ground, Kirtipur
Umpires: Himal Giri (Nep) and Sanjay Gurung (Nep)
Player of the match: Pathum Nissanka (Sri Lanka U23)

- Bhutan won the toss and elected to field.

5 December 2019
09:00
Scorecard

Nepal; 236/3 (20 overs)	v	Bhutan; 95/6 (20 overs)
Gyanendra Malla 107 (55); Karma Dorji 2/45 (4 overs)		Ranjung Mikyo Dorji 27 (23); Paras Khadka 2/11 (4 overs)

Nepal won by 141 runs
Tribhuvan University International Cricket Ground, Kirtipur
Umpires: Deepal Gunawardene (SL) and Buddhi Pradhan (Nep)
Player of the match: Gyanendra Malla (Nep)

- Bhutan won the toss and elected to field.
- Rashid Khan (Nep), Namgang Chejay, Sonam Chophel, Karma Dorji, Ranjung Mikyo Dorji, Ugyen Dorji, Thinley Jamtsho, Jigme Singye, Tobden Singye, Jigme Thinley, Sonam Tobgay and Tenzin Wangchuk Jr. (Bhu) all made their T20I debuts.
- Gyanendra Malla (Nep) scored his first century in T20Is.

5 December 2019
13:00
Scorecard

Sri Lanka U23; 192/4 (20 overs)	v	Maldives; 94/9 (20 overs)
Kamindu Mendis 102* (54); Ibrahim Rizan 1/17 (2 overs)		Mohamed Rishwan 29 (23); Nishan Peiris 2/9 (4 overs)

Sri Lanka U23 won by 98 runs
Tribhuvan University International Cricket Ground, Kirtipur
Umpires: Himal Giri (Nep) and Ram Yadav (Nep)
Player of the match: Kamindu Mendis (Sri Lanka U23)

- Sri Lanka U23 won the toss and elected to bat.

6 December 2019
09:00
Scorecard

Bhutan; 69/7 (20 overs)	v	Bangladesh U23; 74/0 (6.5 overs)
Tenzin Wangchuk Jr. 15 (29); Manik Khan 2/9 (4 overs)		Soumya Sarkar 50* (28)

Bangladesh U23 won by 10 wickets
Tribhuvan University International Cricket Ground, Kirtipur
Umpires: Himal Giri (Nep) and Sanjay Gurung (Nep)
Player of the match: Soumya Sarkar (Bangladesh U23)

- Bhutan won the toss and elected to bat.

6 December 2019
13:00
Scorecard

Nepal; 163/7 (20 overs)	v	Maldives; 79/6 (20 overs)
Karan KC 40* (16); Leem Shafeeg 3/33 (4 overs)		Mohamed Azzam 17* (17); Lalit Rajbanshi 2/18 (4 overs)

Nepal won by 84 runs
Tribhuvan University International Cricket Ground, Kirtipur
Umpires: Deepal Gunawardene (SL) and Buddhi Pradhan (Nep)
Player of the match: Karan KC (Nep)

- Nepal won the toss and elected to bat.
- Nazwan Ismail, Ali Ivan and Leem Shafeeg (Mdv) all made their T20I debuts.

7 December 2019
09:45
Scorecard

Bangladesh U23; 155/6 (20 overs)	v	Nepal; 111/9 (20 overs)
Najmul Hossain Shanto 75* (60); Paras Khadka 3/15 (4 overs)		Gyanendra Malla 43 (43); Tanvir Islam 2/20 (4 overs); Soumya Sarkar 2/20 (4 overs)

Bangladesh U23 won by 44 runs
Tribhuvan University International Cricket Ground, Kirtipur
Umpires: Sanjay Gurung (Nep) and Ram Yadav (Nep)
Player of the match: Nazmul Hossain Shanto (Bangladesh U23)

- Nepal won the toss and elected to field.

7 December 2019
13:00
Scorecard

Bhutan; 117/7 (20 overs)	v	Maldives; 118/2 (15.1 overs)
Jigme Singye 40 (51); Ibrahim Hassan 3/15 (4 overs)		Umar Adam 37* (29); Kezang Nima 1/22 (3 overs)

Maldives won by 8 wickets
Tribhuvan University International Cricket Ground, Kirtipur
Umpires: Deepal Gunawardene (SL) and Buddhi Pradhan (Nep)
Player of the match: Ibrahim Hassan (Mdv)

- Maldives won the toss and elected to field.
- Jigme Dorji, Kinga Loday, Kezang Nima (Bhu) and Azyan Farhath (Mdv) all made their T20I debuts.
- Sonam Tobgay (Bhu) became the first player to retire out in a T20I.

8 December 2019
11:00
Scorecard

Bangladesh U23; 150/6 (20 overs)	v	Sri Lanka U23; 151/1 (16.1 overs)
Yasir Ali 51 (45); Asitha Fernando 2/29 (4 overs)		Lasith Croospulle 73* (41); Mehedi Hasan Rana 1/44 (3 overs)

Sri Lanka U23 won by 9 wickets
Tribhuvan University International Cricket Ground, Kirtipur
Umpires: Himal Giri (Nep) and Ram Yadav (Nep)
Player of the match: Lasith Croospulle (Sri Lanka U23)

- Sri Lanka U23 won the toss and elected to field.

== Medal round ==
=== Bronze medal match ===
9 December 2019
09:00
Scorecard

Maldives; 94/9 (20 overs)	v	Nepal; 98/5 (16.1 overs)
Leem Shafeeg 19* (11); Lalit Rajbanshi 3/6 (4 overs)		Aarif Sheikh 32 (28); Umar Adam 3/20 (4 overs)

Nepal won by 5 wickets
Tribhuvan University International Cricket Ground, Kirtipur
Umpires: Deepal Gunawardene (SL) and Buddhi Pradhan (Nep)
Player of the match: Lalit Rajbanshi (Nep)

- Nepal won the toss and elected to field.

=== Gold medal match ===
9 December 2019
13:00
Scorecard

Sri Lanka U23; 122 (20 overs)	v	Bangladesh U23; 125/3 (18.1 overs)
Shammu Ashan 25 (20); Hasan Mahmud 3/20 (4 overs)		Najmul Hossain Shanto 35* (28); Kamindu Mendis 1/9 (2 overs)

Bangladesh U23 won by 7 wickets
Tribhuvan University International Cricket Ground, Kirtipur
Umpires: Sanjay Gurung (Nep) and Ram Yadav (Nep)
Player of the match: Hasan Mahmud (Bangladesh U23)

- Bangladesh U23 won the toss and elected to field.

== See also ==
- Cricket at the 2019 South Asian Games – Women's tournament
