= Sachindu Colombage =

Sri Lanka cricketer (born 1998)

Personal information
- Full name: Sachindu Maduwantha Colombage
- Born: 21 February 1998 (age 28); Negombo, Sri Lanka
- Batting: Right-handed
- Bowling: Right-arm legbreak

International information
- National side: Sri Lanka (2026–present)
- ODI debut (cap 220): 22 September 2026 v England

Domestic team information
- Years: Team
- 2020: Dambulla Viiking
- 2021: Kandy Warriors
- 2026: Galle Gallants
Medal record
Men's Cricket
Representing Sri Lanka
South Asian Games
| Silver medal – second place | 2019 Kathmandu/Pokhara | Team |
- Source: Cricinfo, 12 November 2019

Sachindu Colombage (Sinhala: සචිඳු කොළඹගේ, [satʃiⁿd̪u koɭəᵐbəgeː] (Note: [ⁿd̪] and [ᵐb] are Prenasalized consonants.); born 21 February 1998) is a Sri Lankan cricketer. He made his Twenty20 debut for Nondescripts Cricket Club in the 2018–19 SLC Twenty20 Tournament on 19 February 2019. He made his List A debut for Nondescripts Cricket Club in the 2018–19 Premier Limited Overs Tournament on 4 March 2019.

In November 2019, he was named in Sri Lanka's squad for the 2019 ACC Emerging Teams Asia Cup in Bangladesh. Later the same month, he was named in Sri Lanka's squad for the men's cricket tournament at the 2019 South Asian Games. The Sri Lanka team won the silver medal, after they lost to Bangladesh by seven wickets in the final. He made his first-class debut on 1 February 2020, for Nondescripts Cricket Club in the 2019–20 Premier League Tournament. In October 2020, he was drafted by the Dambulla Viiking for the inaugural edition of the Lanka Premier League. In August 2021, he was named in the SLC Blues team for the 2021 SLC Invitational T20 League tournament. However, prior to the first match, he tested positive for COVID-19, ruling him out of the tournament.

In July 2022, he was signed by the Galle Gladiators for the third edition of the Lanka Premier League.
