= Krishan Sanjula =

Sri Lankan cricketer (born 1998)

Personal information
- Full name: Wijesuriya Arachchige Krishan Sanjula
- Born: 30 September 1998 (age 28); Ragama, Sri Lanka
- Batting: Right-handed
- Role: Wicket-keeper

Domestic team information
- Years: Team
- 2017–present: SSC
- 2021: Jaffna Kings

Career statistics
Competition	FC	LA	T20
Matches	39	54	38
Runs scored	1,645	2,025	880
Batting average	30.46	44.02	31.42
100s/50s	0/13	1/14	0/8
Top score	92	128*	71*
Catches/stumpings	48/8	56/18	26/11
- Source: ESPNcricinfo, 14 August 2024

Krishan Sanjula (born 30 September 1998) is a Sri Lankan cricketer. He made his first-class debut for Sinhalese Sports Club in the 2016–17 Premier League Tournament on 14 February 2017. In December 2017, he was named in Sri Lanka's squad for the 2018 Under-19 Cricket World Cup. He made his Twenty20 debut for Sinhalese Sports Club in the 2018–19 SLC Twenty20 Tournament on 18 February 2019. He made his List A debut for Sinhalese Sports Club in the 2018–19 Premier Limited Overs Tournament on 12 March 2019.

In August 2021, he was named in the SLC Greens team for the 2021 SLC Invitational T20 League tournament. In November 2021, he was selected to play for the Jaffna Kings following the players' draft for the 2021 Lanka Premier League.
