= Sanoj Darshika =

Sri Lankan cricketer (born 1999)

Personal information
- Born: 22 January 1999 (age 27)
- Source: Cricinfo, 15 February 2019

Sanoj Darshika (born 22 January 1999) is a Sri Lankan cricketer. He made his first-class debut for Bloomfield Cricket and Athletic Club in Tier B of the 2018–19 Premier League Tournament on 31 January 2019. He made his Twenty20 debut for Bloomfield Cricket and Athletic Club in the 2018–19 SLC Twenty20 Tournament on 15 February 2019. He made his List A debut for Bloomfield Cricket and Athletic Club in the 2018–19 Premier Limited Overs Tournament on 4 March 2019.

UK Club Career

Sanoj Darshika has played cricket in the UK for Denby CC (Yorks) of the Huddersfield Premier League in the 2021, 2022 and 2023 seasons

He returned to the UK in 2026 to play for Townville CC in the Bradford Premier League
