= Ashan Madhushanka =

Sri Lankan cricketer (born 1996)

Personal information
- Born: 6 December 1996 (age 29)
- Source: Cricinfo, 13 July 2020

Ashan Madhushanka (born 6 December 1996) is a Sri Lankan cricketer.

He made his first-class debut for Galle Cricket Club in Tier B of the 2018–19 Premier League Tournament on 8 April 2019, his Twenty20 debut for Galle Cricket Club in the 2018–19 SLC Twenty20 Tournament on 15 February 2019 and his List A debut for Galle Cricket Club in the 2018–19 Premier Limited Overs Tournament on 10 March 2019.
