= Gihan Rathnayake =

Sri Lankan cricketer (born 2001)

Personal information
- Born: 14 February 2001 (age 25)
- Source: Cricinfo, 4 March 2021

Ravindu Rathnayake (born 14 February 2001) is a Sri Lankan cricketer. He made his List A debut on 9 March 2019, for Badureliya Sports Club in the 2018–19 Premier Limited Overs Tournament. He made his Twenty20 debut on 4 March 2021, for Badureliya Sports Club in the 2020–21 SLC Twenty20 Tournament.
