= Pawan Dias =

Sri Lankan cricketer (born 1996)

Personal information
- Full name: Pawan Madurajith Dias Edirisinghe
- Born: 19 October 1996 (age 30); Colombo, Sri Lanka
- Source: ESPNcricinfo, 16 January 2017

Pawan Dias (born 19 October 1996) is a Sri Lankan cricketer. He made his first-class debut for Galle Cricket Club in the 2016–17 Premier League Tournament on 13 January 2017. He made his List A debut for Galle Cricket Club in the 2017–18 Premier Limited Overs Tournament on 18 March 2018. He made his Twenty20 debut for Police Sports Club in the 2018–19 SLC Twenty20 Tournament on 18 February 2019.
