= Supun Madushanka =

Sri Lankan cricketer (born 1993)

Personal information
- Born: 11 December 1993 (age 32)
- Source: Cricinfo, 15 February 2019

Supun Madushanka (born 11 December 1993) is a Sri Lankan cricketer. He made his Twenty20 debut for Police Sports Club in the 2018–19 SLC Twenty20 Tournament on 15 February 2019. He made his List A debut for Police Sports Club in the 2018–19 Premier Limited Overs Tournament on 8 March 2019. He made his first-class debut for Police Sports Club in Tier B of the 2018–19 Premier League Tournament on 6 February 2019.
