= Nimesha Mendis =

Sri Lankan cricketer (born 1996)

Personal information
- Born: 11 January 1996 (age 30)
- Source: Cricinfo, 25 February 2018

Nimesha Mendis (born 11 January 1996) is a Sri Lankan cricketer. He made his Twenty20 debut for Sri Lanka Air Force Sports Club in the 2017–18 SLC Twenty20 Tournament on 25 February 2018. He made his List A debut for Sri Lanka Air Force Sports Club in the 2018–19 Premier Limited Overs Tournament on 6 March 2019.
