= Kamal Pushpakumara =

Sri Lankan cricketer

Personal information
- Full name: Kamal Pushpakumara
- Source: Cricinfo, 26 January 2020

Kamal Pushpakumara is a Sri Lankan cricketer. He made his first-class debut for Police Sports Club in Tier B of the 2016–17 Premier League Tournament on 14 January 2017. He made his List A debut for Vauniya District in the 2016–17 Districts One Day Tournament on 18 March 2017. He made his Twenty20 debut for Police Sports Club in the 2018–19 SLC Twenty20 Tournament on 18 February 2019.
