= Heshan Umendra =

Sri Lankan cricketer (born 1996)

Personal information
- Born: 7 October 1996 (age 30)
- Source: Cricinfo, 12 March 2019

Heshan Umendra (born 7 October 1996) is a Sri Lankan cricketer. He made his List A debut for Sri Lanka Air Force Sports Club in the 2018–19 Premier Limited Overs Tournament on 12 March 2019.
