= Yohan Mendis =

Sri Lankan cricketer (born 1997)

Personal information
- Born: 19 January 1997 (age 29)
- Source: Cricinfo, 12 January 2020

Yohan Mendis (born 19 January 1997) is a Sri Lankan cricketer. He made his List A debut for Tamil Union Cricket and Athletic Club in the 2018–19 Premier Limited Overs Tournament on 12 March 2019. He made his Twenty20 debut on 12 January 2020, for Tamil Union Cricket and Athletic Club in the 2019–20 SLC Twenty20 Tournament.

Yohan works for UK based 156 Cricket Coaching as their Director Of Cricket while playing as an overseas player for Pudsey Congs CC.
