= Dilshan Sanjeewa =

Sri Lankan cricketer

Personal information
- Full name: Dilshan Sanjeewa
- Source: Cricinfo, 7 April 2017

Dilshan Sanjeewa is a Sri Lankan cricketer. He made his List A debut for Puttalam District in the 2016–17 Districts One Day Tournament on 25 March 2017. He made his first-class debut for Chilaw Marians Cricket Club in the 2018–19 Premier League Tournament on 7 February 2019. He made his Twenty20 debut for Chilaw Marians Cricket Club in the 2018–19 SLC Twenty20 Tournament on 23 February 2019.
