= Lahiru Attanayake =

Sri Lankan cricketer (born 1999)

Personal information
- Born: 19 May 1999 (age 27)
- Source: ESPNcricinfo, 6 January 2019

Lahiru Attanayake (born 19 May 1999) is a Sri Lankan cricketer. He made his first-class debut for Moors Sports Club in the 2018–19 Premier League Tournament on 4 January 2019. He made his List A debut for Moors Sports Club in the 2018–19 Premier Limited Overs Tournament on 10 March 2019. He made his Twenty20 debut on 10 January 2020, for Moors Sports Club in the 2019–20 SLC Twenty20 Tournament.
