= Lasith Croospulle =

Sri Lankan cricketer (born 1998)

Personal information
- Full name: Dian Lasith Shenan Croospulle
- Born: 10 October 1998 (age 28); Negombo, Sri Lanka
- Batting: Right-handed
- Bowling: Right-arm off-break
- Role: Opening batter

International information
- National side: Sri Lanka
- Only T20I (cap 100): 4 October 2023 v Afghanistan
Medal record
Representing Sri Lanka
Men's Cricket
Asian Games
Bronze medal – third place	2026 Aichi–Nagoya	Team
South Asian Games
Silver medal – second place	2019 Kathmandu/Pokhara	Team
- Source: Cricinfo, 24 February 2018

Lasith Croospulle (born 10 October 1998) is a Sri Lankan cricketer, who is a right-handed opening batsman. He made his international debut for Sri Lanka cricket team.

== Domestic career ==
He made his Twenty20 debut for Negombo Cricket Club in the 2017–18 SLC Twenty20 Tournament on 24 February 2018. He made his List A debut for Negombo Cricket Club in the 2017–18 Premier Limited Overs Tournament on 10 March 2018. In August 2021, he was named in the SLC Greys team for the 2021 SLC Invitational T20 League tournament.

In July 2022, he was signed by the Dambulla Giants for the third edition of the Lanka Premier League. In January 2024, he was signed by Durdanto Dhaka to play for them in the 2024 Bangladesh Premier League.

== International career ==
In April 2022, Sri Lanka Cricket (SLC) named him in the Sri Lanka Emerging Team's squad for their tour to England. In June 2022, he was named in the Sri Lanka A squad for their matches against Australia A during Australia's tour of Sri Lanka.

In March 2023, he was named in Sri Lanka's One Day International and Twenty20 International squad for the series against New Zealand. In October 2023, he was selected to play for Sri Lanka in the 2023 Asian Games. He made his T20I debut for Sri Lanka on 4 October 2023, against Afghanistan.
