= Suminda Lakshan =

Sri Lankan cricketer

Personal information
- Full name: Kumarage Wathe Suminda Lakshan Fernando
- Born: 7 April 1997 (age 29); Colombo, Sri Lanka
- Batting: Right-handed
- Bowling: Right-arm Leg-break
- Role: All-rounder
- Source: Cricinfo, 23 April 2022

Suminda Lakshan (born 7 April 1997) is a Sri Lankan cricketer. He made his List A debut for Trincomalee District in the 2016–17 Districts One Day Tournament on 18 March 2017. He made his Twenty20 debut for Sri Lanka Air Force Sports Club in the 2018–19 SLC Twenty20 Tournament on 15 February 2019.

In July 2021, Lakshan was added to Sri Lanka's Twenty20 International (T20I) squad for their series against India. The following month, he was named in the SLC Greens team for the 2021 SLC Invitational T20 League tournament. In November 2021, he was selected to play for the Galle Gladiators following the players' draft for the 2021 Lanka Premier League. Later the same month, he was named in Sri Lanka's Test squad for their series against the West Indies. In April 2022, he was named in Sri Lanka's Test squad for their series against Bangladesh. In June 2022, he was named in the Sri Lanka A squad for their matches against Australia A during Australia's tour of Sri Lanka.

In July 2022, he was signed by the Jaffna Kings for the third edition of the Lanka Premier League.
