= Sri Lanka Army Ordnance Corps International Cricket Stadium =

Cricket ground

- Location: Horana, Sri Lanka
- End names
- Dombagoda End; Main Pavilion End
- As of 18 February 2019; Source: Cricinfo

The Sri Lanka Army Ordnance Corps International Cricket Stadium is a cricket ground in Horana, Sri Lanka, which was opened in November 2018. In February 2019, it hosted matches in the 2018–19 SLC Twenty20 Tournament.
