= Chanaka Devinda =

Sri Lankan cricketer (born 1997)

Personal information
- Full name: Chanaka Devinda
- Born: 25 June 1997 (age 29)
- Source: Cricinfo, 4 April 2017

Chanaka Devinda (born 25 June 1997) is a Sri Lankan cricketer. He made his List A debut for Kilinochchi District in the 2016–17 Districts One Day Tournament on 19 March 2017. He made his first-class debut for Saracens Sports Club in the 2017–18 Premier League Tournament on 6 February 2018. He made his Twenty20 debut for Lankan Cricket Club in the 2018–19 SLC Twenty20 Tournament on 16 February 2019.
