= Kevin Koththigoda =

Sri Lankan cricketer (born 1998)

Personal information
- Born: 4 October 1998 (age 28); Galle, Sri Lanka
- Batting: Left-handed
- Bowling: Right-arm leg-spinner
- Role: All-rounder
- Source: Cricinfo, 15 February 2019

Kevin Koththigoda (born 4 October 1998) is a Sri Lankan cricketer. He made his Twenty20 debut for Galle Cricket Club in the 2018–19 SLC Twenty20 Tournament on 15 February 2019. He made his List A debut for Galle Cricket Club in the 2018–19 Premier Limited Overs Tournament on 4 March 2019. In November 2021, he was selected to play for the Galle Gladiators following the players' draft for the 2021 Lanka Premier League. In July 2022, he was signed by the Colombo Stars for the third edition of the Lanka Premier League.
