= Charuka Kahagalla =

Sri Lankan cricketer (born 1988)

Charuka Kahagalla (born 9 June 1988) is a Sri Lankan cricketer. He is a left-handed batsman and right-arm off-break bowler who plays for Sebastianites Cricket and Athletic Club. He was born in Diwulapitaya.

Kahagalla made his List A debut during the 2009-10 Premier Limited Overs Tournament, against Burgher Recreation Club. He did not bat or bowl in the match, making his debut with the bat in the following match, scoring 11 runs against Police Sports Club.
