= Manelker de Silva =

Sri Lankan cricketer (born 1998)

Personal information
- Born: 8 August 1998 (age 28)
- Source: Cricinfo, 17 December 2017

Manelker de Silva (born 8 August 1998) is a Sri Lankan cricketer. He made his first-class debut for Colombo Cricket Club in the 2017–18 Premier League Tournament on 15 December 2017. He made his Twenty20 debut for Colombo Cricket Club in the 2017–18 SLC Twenty20 Tournament on 24 February 2018. He made his List A debut for Colombo Cricket Club in the 2018–19 Premier Limited Overs Tournament on 8 March 2019.

In April 2022, Sri Lanka Cricket (SLC) named him in the Sri Lanka Emerging Team's squad for their tour to England.
