= Yohan Chanuka =

Sri Lankan cricketer (born 1994)

Personal information
- Born: 4 May 1994 (age 32)
- Source: Cricinfo, 15 February 2019

Yohan Chanuka (born 4 May 1994) is a Sri Lankan cricketer. He made his Twenty20 debut for Sri Lanka Ports Authority Cricket Club in the 2015-16 AIA Premier T20 Tournament on 13 January 2016. He made his List A debut for Sri Lanka Ports Authority Cricket Club in the 2018–19 Premier Limited Overs Tournament on 8 March 2019.
