= Vishva Chathuranga =

Sri Lankan cricketer (born 1998)

Personal information
- Full name: Bamina Hannadige Vishva Chathuranga Peiris
- Born: 9 October 1998 (age 28); Moratuwa, Sri Lanka
Medal record
Representing Sri Lanka
Men's Cricket
South Asian Games
Silver medal – second place	2019 Kathmandu/Pokhara	Team
- Source: Cricinfo, 30 December 2016

Bamina Hannadige Vishva Chathuranga Peiris, known as Vishva Chathuranga (born 9 October 1998) is a Sri Lankan cricketer. He made his first-class debut for Galle Cricket Club in the 2016–17 Premier League Tournament on 28 December 2016. He made his Twenty20 debut for Panadura Sports Club in the 2017–18 SLC Twenty20 Tournament on 24 February 2018. He made his List A debut for Panadura Sports Club in the 2017–18 Premier Limited Overs Tournament on 16 March 2018.

In August 2018, he was named in Colombo's squad the 2018 SLC T20 League. In November 2019, he was named in Sri Lanka's squad for the men's cricket tournament at the 2019 South Asian Games. The Sri Lanka team won the silver medal, after they lost to Bangladesh by seven wickets in the final.
