= Kasun Ekanayake =

Sri Lankan cricketer (born 1997)

Personal information
- Born: 19 March 1997 (age 29)
- Source: Cricinfo, 2 March 2018

Kasun Ekanayake (born 19 March 1997) is a Sri Lankan cricketer. He made his Twenty20 debut for Bloomfield Cricket and Athletic Club in the 2017–18 SLC Twenty20 Tournament on 1 March 2018. He made his first-class debut for Bloomfield Cricket and Athletic Club in Tier B of the 2018–19 Premier League Tournament on 31 January 2019. He made his List A debut for Bloomfield Cricket and Athletic Club in the 2018–19 Premier Limited Overs Tournament on 8 March 2019.
