= Sanjika Ridma =

Sri Lankan cricketer (born 1995)

Personal information
- Born: 15 February 1995 (age 31); Matara, Sri Lanka
- Source: Cricinfo, 15 March 2017

Sanjika Ridma (born 15 February 1995) is a Sri Lankan cricketer. He made his first-class debut for Sri Lanka Army Sports Club in the 2014–15 Premier Trophy on 16 January 2015.
