= Saliya Saman =

Sri Lankan cricketer (born 1985)

Personal information
- Born: 25 November 1985 (age 40); Balapitiya, Sri Lanka
- Batting: Right-handed
- Bowling: Right-arm medium fast
- Role: Allrounder
- Source: Cricinfo, 29 January 2016

Saliya Saman (born 25 November 1985) is a Sri Lankan first-class cricketer who plays for Chilaw Marians Cricket Club. He made his Twenty20 debut on 17 August 2004, for Galle Cricket Club in the 2004 SLC Twenty20 Tournament.

== See also ==
- List of Chilaw Marians Cricket Club players
