= Rajeewa Weerasinghe =

Sri Lankan cricketer (born 1987)

Personal information
- Born: 26 August 1987 (age 39)
- Source: Cricinfo, 27 February 2018

Rajeewa Weerasinghe (born 26 August 1987) is a Sri Lankan cricketer. He made his first-class debut for Badureliya Sports Club in the 2006–07 Premier Trophy on 15 Decenver 2006.
