= Nilan de Silva =

Sri Lankan cricketer (born 1971)

Personal information
- Full name: Walimuni Nilan de Silva
- Born: 28 June 1971 (age 55); Colombo, Sri Lanka

Umpiring information
- WODIs umpired: 3 (2016–2018)
- WT20Is umpired: 2 (2018–2019)
- Source: ESPNcricinfo, 18 July 2016

Nilan de Silva (born 28 June 1971) is a Sri Lankan former cricketer. He played 67 first-class matches for various domestic teams in Sri Lanka between 1990 and 2001. He is now an umpire and stood in a tour match during Australia's tour to Sri Lanka in July 2016 and in matches in Sri Lanka's 2016–17 Premier League Tournament.
