= Nondescripts Cricket Club Ground =

Cricket stadium in Sri Lanka

Coordinates: 6°54′28″N 79°52′3″E

- Interactive map of Nondescripts Cricket Club Ground

Ground information
- Location: Maitland Place, Colombo
- Country: Sri Lanka
- Capacity: 2,000
- Owner: Nondescripts Cricket Club
- Operator: Nondescripts Cricket Club
- Tenants: Nondescripts Cricket Club
- End names
- SSC Ground End; Tennis Court End

International information
- First women's ODI: 15 November 2010: Sri Lanka v England
- Last women's ODI: 19 February 2017: Sri Lanka v Bangladesh
- First women's T20I: 19 November 2010: Sri Lanka v England
- Last women's T20I: 30 March 2018: Sri Lanka v Pakistan

Team information
| Nondescripts Cricket Club | (1888-present) |
- As of 4 September 2020; Source: Cricinfo

Nondescripts Cricket Club Ground, a Sri Lankan first-class cricket ground in Maitland Place, Colombo, is the home ground of the Nondescripts Cricket Club. In February 1926, it hosted the first first-class cricket match ever played in Ceylon (as Sri Lanka was then called).

== Location ==
The ground, which has a seating capacity for 2,000 spectators, is in the Cinnamon Gardens district of Colombo, next to the Sinhalese Sports Club Ground and across Maitland Place from the Colombo Cricket Club Ground.

== History ==
Nondescripts Cricket Club, founded in 1888, moved to the ground in 1910 after reclaiming it from swampland. On 12 and 13 February 1926, it hosted Ceylon's first first-class cricket match, between the touring W. E. Lucas' Bombay XI and Dr. J. Rockwood's Ceylon XI; the Ceylon XI won by seven wickets.

The ground has been in constant use as a first-class venue since 1989. Three One Day International matches were played there in 1986–87, and three Women's One Day Internationals in 2010–11. A new pavilion was opened in 2007. As of mid-November 2025, 240 first-class matches and 184 List A matches had been played at the ground.

== Records ==
The highest first-class score on the ground is 290 not out by Lahiru Udara for Nondescripts against Ragama in 2019–20. The best bowling figures are 8 for 24 by Nimesh Perera for Sebastianites against Nondescripts in 2000–01.
