= Dulanjana Mendis =

Sri Lankan cricketer (born 1990)

Personal information
- Full name: Balapuwaduge Manukulasuriya Dulanjana Kalhara Mendis
- Born: 20 May 1990 (age 36); Colombo, Sri Lanka
- Source: ESPNcricinfo, 14 February 2017

Dulanjana Mendis (born 20 May 1990) is a Sri Lankan cricketer. He made his first-class debut for Sri Lanka Navy Sports Club in the 2009–10 Premier Trophy on 2 October 2009.
