= Bloomfield Cricket and Athletic Club Ground =

Cricket stadium in Sri Lanka

Ground information
- Location: Cinnamon Gardens, Colombo
- Coordinates: 6°54′12″N 79°51′48″E
- Tenants: Bloomfield Cricket and Athletic Club
- End names
- University End; Hockey Ground End

Team information
Bloomfield Cricket and Athletic Club
- As of 3 December 2016; Source: Cricinfo

Bloomfield Cricket and Athletic Club Ground, in Colombo, Sri Lanka, has staged first-class and List A cricket matches since 1991. It is the home ground of the Bloomfield Cricket and Athletic Club cricket team.

== Location ==
The ground is on Reid Avenue, in the Cinnamon Gardens district of Colombo, next to the Colombo Racecourse football ground, and across Reid Avenue from Royal College.

== History ==
When it was founded in the 1890s, Bloomfield Cricket and Athletic Club's ground was in the Colombo suburb of Pettah. The club moved to a ground at Campbell Park, Borella, in 1923. Finally, it moved to the present ground in the 1970s. The first first-class match was in December 1991 between Antonians Sports Club and Kurunegala Youth Cricket Club.

Bloomfield played their first first-class match at the ground in 1994–95. As of mid-February 2025, 207 first-class matches have been played at the ground. Since the first List A match at the ground in July 1994, 128 List A matches have been played there.

The highest first-class score is 237 by Shehan Jayasuriya for Chilaw Marians in 2016–17. The best bowling figures are 9 for 15 by Mario Villavarayan for Bloomfield in 1996–97.
