= Hashan Vimarshana =

Sri Lankan cricketer (born 1994)

Personal information
- Born: 28 November 1994 (age 31); Matara, Sri Lanka
- Batting: Right-handed
- Source: ESPNcricinfo

Hashan Vimarshana (born 28 November 1994) is a Sri Lankan first-class cricketer. He was part of Sri Lanka's squad for the 2014 ICC Under-19 Cricket World Cup. He made his List A debut for Sri Lanka Ports Authority Cricket Club in the 2017–18 Premier Limited Overs Tournament on 10 March 2018.
