= Tharushan Iddamalgoda =

Sri Lankan cricketer (born 1996)

Personal information
- Full name: Manannage Tharushan Gayantha Iddamalgoda
- Born: 5 January 1996 (age 30); Colombo, Sri Lanka
- Batting: Left-handed
- Bowling: leg break
- Source: Cricinfo, 24 February 2018

Tharushan Iddamalgoda (born 5 January 1996) is a Sri Lankan cricketer. He made his Twenty20 debut for Sri Lanka Navy Sports Club in the 2017–18 SLC Twenty20 Tournament on 24 February 2018. He made his List A debut for Sri Lanka Navy Sports Club in the 2017–18 Premier Limited Overs Tournament on 12 March 2018.
