= Nipuna Gamage =

Sri Lankan cricketer (born 1995)

Personal information
- Born: 21 December 1995 (age 30); Sri Jayawardenepura Kotte, Sri Lanka
- Source: Cricinfo, 5 April 2017

Nipuna Gamage (born 21 December 1995) is a Sri Lankan cricketer. He made his List A debut for Polonnaruwa District in the 2016–17 Districts One Day Tournament on 18 March 2017. He made his Twenty20 debut for Kalutara Town Club in the 2017–18 SLC Twenty20 Tournament on 25 February 2018.
