= Panagoda =

Coordinates: 6°50′50″N 80°01′08″E

Panagoda is a town in Western Province, Sri Lanka of Sri Lanka. It is 20 km away from Colombo. Situated there is the Panagoda Cantonment, the largest military base in the country.

== See also ==
- Panagoda Cantonment
