= Dinushka Malan =

Sri Lankan cricketer (born 1993)

Personal information
- Born: 13 June 1993 (age 33)
- Batting: Right-handed
- Bowling: Right-arm medium fast
- Role: Allrounder
- Source: Cricinfo, 24 February 2018

Dinushka Malan (born 13 June 1993) is a Sri Lankan cricketer. He made his Twenty20 debut for Lankan Cricket Club in the 2017–18 SLC Twenty20 Tournament on 24 February 2018. He made his List A debut for Lankan Cricket Club in the 2017–18 Premier Limited Overs Tournament on 18 March 2017.
