= Ranganath Prasanna =

Sri Lankan cricket umpire (born 1975)

Personal information
- Born: 9 March 1975 (age 51)
- Role: Umpire
- Source: Cricinfo, 21 March 2018

Ranganath Prasanna (born 9 March 1975) is a Sri Lankan cricket umpire. He has umpired in domestic matches in cricket tournaments in Sri Lanka, such as the 2017–18 SLC Twenty20 Tournament and the 2017–18 Premier League Tournament. In March 2018, he was one of the two onfield umpires for the quarterfinal match between Chilaw Marians Cricket Club and Burgher Recreation Club in the 2017–18 Premier Limited Overs Tournament.
