= Matheesha Perera =

Sri Lankan cricketer (born 1991)

Personal information
- Born: 17 June 1991 (age 35)
- Source: Cricinfo, 27 February 2018

Matheesha Perera (born 17 June 1991) is a Sri Lankan cricketer. He made his first-class debut for Sri Lanka Police Sports Club in the 2011–12 Premier Trophy on 20 January 2012.
