= Eranga Rathnayake =

Sri Lankan cricketer (born 1992)

Personal information
- Born: 23 January 1992 (age 34); Colombo, Sri Lanka
- Source: Cricinfo, 14 March 2017

Eranga Rathnayake (born 23 January 1992) is a Sri Lankan cricketer. He made his first-class debut for Saracens Sports Club in the 2011–12 Premier Trophy on 24 February 2012. He made his List A debut for Galle District in the 2016–17 Districts One Day Tournament on 26 March 2017.
