= Madushan Ravichandrakumar =

Sri Lankan cricketer (born 1994)

Personal information
- Born: 23 December 1994 (age 31); Colombo, Sri Lanka
- Batting: Right-handed
- Bowling: Right-arm leg break
- Role: All-rounder
- Source: Cricinfo, 9 April 2017

Madushan Ravichandrakumar (born 23 December 1994) is a Sri Lankan cricketer. He made his List A debut for Kegalle District in the 2016–17 Districts One Day Tournament on 15 March 2017. In November 2021, he was selected to play for the Dambulla Giants following the players' draft for the 2021 Lanka Premier League.
