= Dilan Chandima =

Sri Lankan cricketer (born 1990)

Personal information
- Born: 12 February 1990 (age 36)
- Source: Cricinfo, 15 February 2019

Dilan Chandima (born 12 February 1990) is a Sri Lankan cricketer. He made his Twenty20 debut for Sri Lanka Navy Sports Club in the 2009–10 Premier Trophy on 2 October 2009.
