= Deepal Gunawardene =

Sri Lankan cricketer (born 1969)

Personal information
- Born: 21 October 1969 (age 57); Colombo, Sri Lanka
- Batting: Left-handed
- Bowling: Right-arm medium

Umpiring information
- T20Is umpired: 4 (2019)
- WODIs umpired: 6 (2015–2019)
- WT20Is umpired: 7 (2013–2022)
- Source: Cricinfo, 9 December 2019

Deepal Gunawardene (born 21 October 1969) is a Sri Lankan cricket umpire and former first class cricketer. As an umpire, he stood in a tour match between Sri Lanka Board President's XI and West Indians in October 2015.

== Biography ==
Gunawardene attended Dharmapala College Pannipitiya. Representing Police SC in cricket from 1989 to 2003, he transitioned to umpiring post-retirement. He secured third place in Sri Lanka Cricket's 2006-07 Premier panel examination and served as a standby umpire for the 2008 Sri Lanka-England Test. Additionally, he officiated in the 2007 Elite Cup under-19 tournament in Malaysia.

On 5 December 2019, he umpired in his first Twenty20 International (T20I) match, between Nepal and Bhutan in the men's tournament at the 2019 South Asian Games.

== See also ==
- List of Twenty20 International cricket umpires
