= Sampath Perera (cricketer) =

Sri Lankan cricketer (born 1982)

Personal information
- Full name: Dehiwalage Don Rasika Sampath Perera
- Born: 27 July 1982 (age 44); Galle
- Batting: Left-handed
- Bowling: Right-arm fast-medium
- Source: Cricinfo, 16 July 2020

Sampath Perera (born 27 July 1982) is a Sri Lankan cricketer. He made his List A debut on 14 November 2007, for Saracens Sports Club in the 2007–08 Premier Limited Overs Tournament. He made his first-class debut on 5 December 2008, for Singha Sports Club in Tier B of the 2008–09 Premier League Tournament. He made his Twenty20 debut on 26 March 2012, for Panadura Sports Club in the 2019–20 SLC Twenty20 Tournament.

In July 2018, Perera was appointed head coach of the Malaysia national cricket team on a two-year contract.
