= Dhanushka Dharmasiri =

Sri Lankan cricketer (born 1992)

Personal information
- Born: 27 February 1992 (age 34); Matale, Sri Lanka
- Source: Cricinfo, 7 April 2017

Dhanushka Dharmasiri (born 27 February 1992) is a Sri Lankan cricketer. He made his List A debut for Kurunegala District in the 2016–17 Districts One Day Tournament on 18 March 2017. He made his Twenty20 debut for Kurunegala Youth Cricket Club in the 2017–18 SLC Twenty20 Tournament on 25 February 2018.
