= Poorna Charuka =

Sri Lankan cricketer (born 1997)

Personal information
- Born: 24 March 1997 (age 29); Homagama, Sri Lanka
- Source: Cricinfo, 24 February 2018

Poorna Charuka (born 24 March 1997) is a Sri Lankan cricketer. He made his Twenty20 debut for Lankan Cricket Club in the 2017–18 SLC Twenty20 Tournament on 24 February 2018. He made his List A debut for Lankan Cricket Club in the 2017–18 Premier Limited Overs Tournament on 18 March 2018.
