= Kandy Customs Sports Club =

First-class cricket team in Sri Lanka

Team information
- Founded: 2019

Kandy Customs Sports Club is a first-class cricket team based in Kandy, Sri Lanka. Founded in 2019, they were one of the 24 teams to take part in the 2018–19 SLC Twenty20 Tournament, starting on 15 February 2019. In their opening match of the competition, they lost to Tamil Union Cricket and Athletic Club by 65 runs. In March 2019, the team joined the Premier Limited Overs Tournament, a List A competition, but they were eliminated at the group stage.

Kandy Customs acquired first-class status on 31 January 2020 when they played their opening match in Tier B of the Premier Trophy against Panadura Sports Club. They finished fourth among the twelve teams taking part. For the next two years, domestic cricket in Sri Lanka was disrupted by the COVID-19 pandemic. The Premier Trophy was rebranded as the Major League Tournament before its relaunch in August 2022. Kandy Customs joined Group A and played their opening match on 19–21 August against Colts, losing by an innings and 340 runs. They went on to finish eighth of the thirteen teams in Group A.
