= 2020–21 SLC Twenty20 Tournament =

Cricket tournament

- Dates: 4 – 20 March 2021
- Administrator: Sri Lanka Cricket
- Cricket format: Twenty20
- Tournament format: Round-robin then knockout
- Host: Sri Lanka
- Champions: Sinhalese Sports Club
- Participants: 26
- Matches: 79
- Most runs: Gayan Maneeshan (258)
- Most wickets: Ishan Jayaratne (16); Malinda Pushpakumara (16)

The 2020–21 SLC Twenty20 Tournament was a Twenty20 cricket tournament that was held in Sri Lanka. It took place from 4 to 20 March 2021. Colombo Cricket Club were the defending champions. A total of 26 teams took part in the tournament, split into four groups, with 79 matches being played.

Sinhalese Sports Club and Sri Lanka Army Sports Club reached the final of the tournament, with Sinhalese Sports Club winning the match by 29 runs.

== Group stage ==
=== Group A ===
4 March 2021
Scorecard

Nugegoda Sports and Welfare Club; 164/8 (20 overs)	v	Badureliya Sports Club; 139 (18.2 overs)
Muditha Lakshan 73 (42); Mithira Thenura 3/25 (4 overs)		Sandun Weerakkody 37 (26); Pramud Hettiwatte 4/13 (1.2 overs)

Nugegoda Sports and Welfare Club won by 25 runs
Sinhalese Sports Club Ground, Colombo
Umpires: Chamara de Soysa and Ruchira Palliyaguruge

- Badureliya Sports Club won the toss and elected to field.
- Gihan Rathnayake, Mithira Thenura (Badureliya Sports Club), Muditha Lakshan and Sakuna Liyanage (Nugegoda Sports and Welfare Club) all made their T20 debuts.

4 March 2021
Scorecard

Galle Cricket Club; 75 (16.1 overs)	v	Colombo Cricket Club; 79/2 (7.1 overs)
Dilshan Kanchana 17 (20); Lahiru Madushanka 2/7 (2 overs)		Minod Bhanuka 29* (15); Chalana de Silva 1/18 (2 overs)

Colombo Cricket Club won by 8 wickets
Sinhalese Sports Club Ground, Colombo
Umpires: Chamara de Soysa and Ruchira Palliyaguruge

- Galle Cricket Club won the toss and elected to bat.
- Chamindu Wijesinghe, Sonal Dinusha (Colombo Cricket Club), and Pawan de Silva (Galle Cricket Club) all made their T20 debuts.

5 March 2021
Scorecard

Negambo Cricket Club; 172/6 (20 overs)	v	Burgher Recreation Club; 125/9 (20 overs)
Madawa Warnapura 42 (23); Chameera Dissanayake 2/27 (4 overs); Duvindu Tillakaratne 2/27 (4 overs)		Leo Fransisco 26 (25); Roscoe Thattil 5/23 (4 overs)

Negombo Cricket Club won by 47 runs
FTZ Sports Complex, Katunayake
Umpires: Raveendra Wimalasiri and Susantha Dissanayake

- Burgher Recreation Club won the toss and elected to field.

5 March 2021
Scorecard

Kandy Customs Cricket Club; 158/8 (20 overs)	v	Badureliya Sports Club; 154/9 (20 overs)
Akeel Inham 38 (26); Nimanda Madushanka 2/29 (4 overs)		Tillakaratne Sampath 43 (35); Isitha Wijesundera 4/15 (4 overs)

Kandy Customs Cricket Club won by 4 runs
FTZ Sports Complex, Katunayake
Umpires: Raveendra Wimalasiri and Susantha Dissanayake

- Kandy Customs Cricket Club won the toss and elected to bat.
- Dunith Jayatunga (Badureliya Sports Club), Isitha Wijesundera, Rishi Bhardwaj, Sasith Manuranga and Vishwa Deemantha (Kandy Customs Cricket Club) all made their T20 debuts.

6 March 2021
Scorecard

Burgher Recreation Club; 162 (20 overs)	v	Galle Cricket Club; 46/5 (11 overs)
Dushan Hemantha 48 (30); Dilshan Kanchana 2/23 (3 overs)		Imesh Udayanga 16* (26); Mohamed Shiraz 2/7 (2 overs)

Burgher Recreation Club won by 47 runs (DLS method)
Sinhalese Sports Club Ground, Colombo
Umpires: Deepal Gunawardene and Eric Kannangara

- Burgher Recreation Club won the toss and elected to bat.

6 March 2021
Scorecard

Colombo Cricket Club; 160/9 (20 overs)	v	Nugegoda Sports and Welfare Club; 152/4 (20 overs)
Ashan Priyanjan 39 (25); Minhaj Jalill 2/17 (4 overs)		Pramud Hettiwatte 41* (38); Lahiru Gamage 2/36 (4 overs)

Colombo Cricket Club won by 8 runs
Sinhalese Sports Club Ground, Colombo
Umpires: Deepal Gunawardene and Eric Kannangara

- Nugegoda Sports and Welfare Club won the toss and elected to field.

7 March 2021
Scorecard

Negambo Cricket Club; 155/9 (20 overs)	v	Colombo Cricket Club; 161/3 (19.3 overs)
Angelo Jayasinghe 43 (38); Malinda Pushpakumara 3/22 (4 overs)		Minod Bhanuka 85* (55); Dilshan Munaweera 1/20 (4 overs)

Colombo Cricket Club won by 7 wickets
P Sara Oval, Colombo
Umpires: Dammika Rajapakse and Raveendra Wimalasiri

- Negombo Cricket Club won the toss and elected to bat.

7 March 2021
Scorecard

Galle Cricket Club; 114/9 (20 overs)	v	Badureliya Sports Club; 115/5 (15.5 overs)
Eranga Rathnayake 30 (30); Nimanda Madushanka 5/19 (4 overs)		Tillakaratne Sampath 55 (30); Nimesh Perera 2/26 (4 overs)

Badureliya Sports Club won by 5 wickets
P Sara Oval, Colombo
Umpires: Dammika Rajapakse and Raveendra Wimalasiri

- Badureliya Sports Club won the toss and elected to field.
- Jacob Sachin (Galle Cricket Club) made his T20 debut.

9 March 2021
Scorecard

Burgher Recreation Club; 169/7 (20 overs)	v	Kandy Customs Cricket Club; 130/9 (20 overs)
Shanuka Dulaj 55 (39); Sehan Weerasinghe 2/33 (4 overs)		Sehan Weerasinghe 45 (43); Sachintha Peiris 3/28 (4 overs)

Burgher Recreation Club won by 39 runs
Sinhalese Sports Club Ground, Colombo
Umpires: Chaturan Sanjeewa and Lyndon Hannibal

- Burgher Recreation Club won the toss and elected to bat.

9 March 2021
Scorecard

Badureliya Sports Club; 156/8 (20 overs)	v	Negombo Cricket Club; 108 (18.5 overs)
Gamindu Kanishka 38* (21); Nisala Tharaka 2/26 (4 overs)		Dilshan Munaweera 27 (23); Nimanda Madushanka 3/26 (3.5 overs)

Badureliya Sports Club won by 48 runs
Sinhalese Sports Club Ground, Colombo
Umpires: Chaturan Sanjeewa and Lyndon Hannibal

- Negombo Cricket Club won the toss and elected to field.
- Umayanga Suwaris (Badureliya Sports Club) made his T20 debut.

10 March 2021
Scorecard

Kandy Customs Cricket Club; 91 (18.4 overs)	v	Colombo Cricket Club; 92/6 (15.3 overs)
Vishva Wijeratne 36 (37); Malinda Pushpakumara 4/9 (4 overs)		Lasith Abeyratne 53 (35); Sachithra Perera 3/13 (4 overs)

Colombo Cricket Club won by 4 wickets
Sinhalese Sports Club Ground, Colombo
Umpires: Krishantha Rodrigo and Ranmore Martinesz

- Colombo Cricket Club won the toss and elected to field.
- Pavan Rathnayake (Colombo Cricket Club) made his T20 debut.

10 March 2021
Scorecard

Nugegoda Sports and Welfare Club; 164/8 (19 overs)	v	Burgher Recreation Club
Pramud Hettiwatte 66 (38); Lahiru Samarakoon 3/24 (3 overs)

No result
Sinhalese Sports Club Ground, Colombo
Umpires: Krishantha Rodrigo and Ranmore Martinesz

- Nugegoda Sports and Welfare Club won the toss and elected to bat.

11 March 2021
Scorecard

Galle Cricket Club; 144/7 (20 overs)	v	Negombo Cricket Club
Eranga Rathnayake 51 (36); Nishan Peiris 3/33 (4 overs)

No result
P Sara Oval, Colombo
Umpires: Nilan De Silva and Sanjeewa Fernando

- Negombo Cricket Club won the toss and elected to field.

11 March 2021
Scorecard

Burgher Recreation Club; 179/6 (20 overs)	v	Badureliya Sports Club; 158/9 (20 overs)
Dushan Hemantha 58* (43); Nimanda Madushanka 3/28 (4 overs)		Milinda Siriwardana 46 (26); Chameera Dissanayake 3/17 (3 overs)

Burgher Recreation Club won by 21 runs
P Sara Oval, Colombo
Umpires: Nilan De Silva and Sanjeewa Fernando

- Burgher Recreation Club won the toss and elected to bat.
- Malinda Jayod (Badureliya Sports Club) made his T20 debut.

12 March 2021
Scorecard

Colombo Cricket Club; 142/6 (20 overs)	v	Badureliya Sports Club; 116 (19.1 overs)
Lasith Abeyratne 52 (52); Buddika Sanjeewa 3/24 (4 overs)		Yashodha Lanka 41 (38); Lahiru Gamage 4/13 (4 overs)

Colombo Cricket Club won by 26 runs
Sinhalese Sports Club Ground, Colombo
Umpires: Chaminda Hathurusingha and Pradeep Udawatta

- Colombo Cricket Club won the toss and elected to bat.

12 March 2021
Scorecard

Kandy Customs Cricket Club; 159/5 (20 overs)	v	Nugegoda Sports and Welfare Club; 116 (19.4 overs)
Vishva Wijeratne 52 (46); Vinodh Perera 3/24 (3 overs)		Umesh Karunaratne 22 (28); Sachithra Perera 3/12 (4 overs)

Kandy Customs Cricket Club won by 43 runs
Sinhalese Sports Club Ground, Colombo
Umpires: Chaminda Hathurusingha and Pradeep Udawatta

- Kandy Customs Cricket Club won the toss and elected to bat.
- Sajith Priyal (Kandy Customs Cricket Club) made his T20 debut.

13 March 2021
Scorecard

Galle Cricket Club; 145/7 (20 overs)	v	Kandy Customs Cricket Club; 121 (19.1 overs)
Eranga Rathnayake 45 (32); Sampath Perera 3/34 (4 overs)		Chanaka Wijesinghe 24 (23); Chalana de Silva 4/23 (4 overs)

Galle Cricket Club won by 24 runs
Sinhalese Sports Club Ground, Colombo
Umpires: R P Massalage and Rohitha Kottahachchi

- Galle Cricket Club won the toss and elected to bat.

13 March 2021
Scorecard

Nugegoda Sports and Welfare Club; 153/5 (20 overs)	v	Negombo Cricket Club; 154/1 (16.5 overs)
Muditha Lakshan 60* (41); Roshen Fernando 2/28 (4 overs)		Dilshan Munaweera 74 (44); Vikum Sanjaya 1/29 (4 overs)

Negombo Cricket Club won by 9 wickets
Sinhalese Sports Club Ground, Colombo
Umpires: R P Massalage and Rohitha Kottahachchi

- Nugegoda Sports and Welfare Club won the toss and elected to bat.

14 March 2021
Scorecard

Burgher Recreation Club; 114/8 (20 overs)	v	Colombo Cricket Club; 118/3 (11.4 overs)
Shanuka Dulaj 50 (47); Lahiru Madushanka 4/15 (3 overs)		Ron Chandraguptha 38 (24); Sachintha Peiris 3/21 (4 overs)

Colombo Cricket Club won by 7 wickets
FTZ Sports Complex, Katunayake
Umpires: Keerthi Bandara and Nilantha Semasinghe

- Burgher Recreation Club won the toss and elected to bat.
- Kavindu Ranasinghe (Colombo Cricket Club) made his T20 debut.

14 March 2021
Scorecard

Negombo Cricket Club; 150/7 (20 overs)	v	Kandy Customs Cricket Club; 54/8 (9 overs)
Angelo Jayasinghe 37 (41); Sachithra Perera 3/27 (4 overs)		Akeel Inham 26 (21); Roshen Fernando 3/13 (2 overs)

Negombo Cricket Club won by 16 runs (DLS method)
FTZ Sports Complex, Katunayake
Umpires: Keerthi Bandara and Nilantha Semasinghe

- Negombo Cricket Club won the toss and elected to bat.
- Thimira Malshan (Kandy Customs Cricket Club) made his T20 debut.

14 March 2021
Scorecard

Nugegoda Sports and Welfare Club; 134 (20 overs)	v	Galle Cricket Club; 135/5 (19.5 overs)
Muditha Lakshan 52 (39); Rajith Priyan 4/20 (4 overs)		Dilshan Kanchana 56* (55); Vinodh Perera 3/25 (3 overs)

Galle Cricket Club won by 5 wickets
Nondescripts Cricket Club Ground, Colombo
Umpires: Mohan de Silva and Ruchira Palliyaguruge

- Nugegoda Sports and Welfare Club won the toss and elected to field.
- Iresh Chamara, Kavindana Perera and Sandaruwan Fernando (Nugegoda Sports and Welfare Club) all made their T20 debuts.

=== Group B ===
4 March 2021
Scorecard

Nondescripts Cricket Club; 155/7 (20 overs)	v	Bloomfield Cricket and Athletic Club; 106/7 (20 overs)
Hasitha Boyagoda 38 (37); Vinuja Ranpul 1/23 (2 overs)		Harsha Vithana 25 (33); Chamika Gunasekara 3/4 (3 overs)

Nondescripts Cricket Club won by 49 runs
Colombo Cricket Club Ground, Colombo
Umpires: Prageeth Rambukwella and Shantha Fonseka

- Bloomfield Cricket and Athletic Club won the toss and elected to field.
- Ashian Daniel, Dineth Jayakody (Nondescripts Cricket Club), Deshan Fernando and Vinuja Ranpul (Bloomfield Cricket and Athletic Club) all made their T20 debuts.

4 March 2021
Scorecard

Sri Lanka Ports Authority Cricket Club; 128 (19.5 overs)	v	Colts Cricket Club; 129/2 (15.5 overs)
Ishan Rangana 39 (29); Dhananjaya Lakshan 3/17 (3.5 overs)		Priyamal Perera 62* (36); Rajeewa Weerasinghe 1/25 (3.5 overs)

Colts Cricket Club won by 8 wickets
Colombo Cricket Club Ground, Colombo
Umpires: Prageeth Rambukwella and Shantha Fonseka

- Sri Lanka Ports Authority Cricket Club won the toss and elected to bat.
- Bishan Hettiarchchi, Navodya Imesh (Sri Lanka Ports Authority Cricket Club), Heshan Dhanushka, Rohan Sanjaya and Santhush Gunathilake (Colts Cricket Club) all made their T20 debuts.

5 March 2021
Scorecard

Lankan Cricket Club; 137/6 (20 overs)	v	Sri Lanka Air Force Sports Club; 138/4 (17.1 overs)
Harsha Cooray 59 (51); Lasanda Rukmal 3/34 (4 overs)		Madhawa Nimesh 37 (27); Geeth Kumara 2/22 (4 overs)

Sri Lanka Air Force Sports Club won by 6 wickets
Colombo Cricket Club Ground, Colombo
Umpires: Gamini Dissanayake and Ravindra Kottahachchi

- Sri Lanka Air Force Sports Club won the toss and elected to field.
- Sandaruwan Chinthaka (Sri Lanka Air Force Sports Club) made his T20 debut.

5 March 2021
Scorecard

Sri Lanka Ports Authority Cricket Club; 115/8 (20 overs)	v	Nondescripts Cricket Club; 119/2 (15.1 overs)
Yohan de Silva 33 (32); Chaturanga de Silva 2/16 (4 overs)		Lahiru Udara 65* (41); Kavindu Ridmal 1/22 (3 overs)

Nondescripts Cricket Club won by 8 wickets
Colombo Cricket Club Ground, Colombo
Umpires: Gamini Dissanayake and Ravindra Kottahachchi

- Sri Lanka Ports Authority Cricket Club won the toss and elected to bat.

6 March 2021
Scorecard

Bloomfield Cricket and Athletic Club; 167/5 (20 overs)	v	Sri Lanka Air Force Sports Club; 85/2 (11 overs)
Kasun Ekanayake 81* (59); Nimesha Mendis 2/23 (4 overs)		Udayawansha Parakrama 35 (27); Madushan Ravichandrakumar 1/6 (1 over)

Sri Lanka Air Force Sports Club won by 4 runs (DLS method)
P Sara Oval, Colombo
Umpires: Pradeep Udawatta and Sisira Kumara

- Sri Lanka Air Force Sports Club won the toss and elected to field.
- Kemira Wijenayake (Bloomfield Cricket and Athletic Club) made his T20 debut.

6 March 2021
Scorecard

Lankan Cricket Club; 164/4 (20 overs)	v	Colts Cricket Club; 162 (20 overs)
Harsha Cooray 65* (38); Rohan Sanjaya 2/14 (3 overs)		Priyamal Perera 41 (26); Roshan Jayatissa 3/27 (3 overs)

Lankan Cricket Club won by 2 runs
P Sara Oval, Colombo
Umpires: Pradeep Udawatta and Sisira Kumara

- Colts Cricket Club won the toss and elected to field.
- Nipun Malinga (Colts Cricket Club) made his T20 debut.

7 March 2021
Scorecard

Nondescripts Cricket Club; 169/6 (20 overs)	v	Lankan Cricket Club; 49 (13.1 overs)
Dineth Jayakody 57 (33); Saliya Saman 3/32 (4 overs)		Vimukthi Perera 10 (9); Chamika Gunasekara 3/5 (3 overs)

Nondescripts Cricket Club won by 120 runs
Colombo Cricket Club Ground, Colombo
Umpires: Ranjith Vishwakula and Ruchira Palliyaguruge

- Nondescripts Cricket Club won the toss and elected to bat.

7 March 2021
Scorecard

Colts Cricket Club; 177/8 (20 overs)	v	Sri Lanka Air Force Sports Club; 127 (18.4 overs)
Jehan Daniel 44* (16); Lasanda Rukmal 3/38 (4 overs)		Udayawansha Parakrama 28 (25); Nalin Priyadarshana 3/17 (4 overs)

Colts Cricket Club won by 50 runs
Colombo Cricket Club Ground, Colombo
Umpires: Ranjith Vishwakula and Ruchira Palliyaguruge

- Sri Lanka Air Force Sports Club won the toss and elected to field.

9 March 2021
Scorecard

Bloomfield Cricket and Athletic Club; 127/6 (20 overs)	v	Sri Lanka Ports Authority Cricket Club; 88/8 (20 overs)
Dilhan Cooray 73 (58); Pasindu Ushettige 3/7 (4 overs)		Shashrika Pussegolla 23 (37); Mishen Silva 2/5 (2 overs)

Bloomfield Cricket and Athletic Club won by 39 runs
P Sara Oval, Colombo
Umpires: Eric Kannangara and Rohitha Kottahachchi

- Ace Capital Cricket Club won the toss and elected to field.

9 March 2021
Scorecard

Nondescripts Cricket Club; 170/5 (20 overs)	v	Sri Lanka Air Force Sports Club; 90 (16.4 overs)
Angelo Perera 45 (41); Sanjaya Ranaweera 2/21 (2 overs)		Sameera de Zoysa 25 (13); Thiwanka Kekulawalage 2/4 (1.4 overs)

Nondescripts Cricket Club won by 80 runs
P Sara Oval, Colombo
Umpires: Eric Kannangara and Rohitha Kottahachchi

- Nondescripts Cricket Club won the toss and elected to bat.

10 March 2021
Scorecard

Colts Cricket Club; 146/8 (20 overs)	v	Bloomfield Cricket and Athletic Club; 126/6 (20 overs)
Dhananjaya Lakshan 63 (47); Dileepa Jayalath 2/15 (2 overs)		Sachin Jayawardena 32 (35); Saranga Rajaguru 3/22 (4 overs)

Colts Cricket Club won by 20 runs
Colombo Cricket Club Ground, Colombo
Umpires: Hemantha Boteju

- Colts Cricket Club won the toss and elected to bat.
- Avishka Perera (Colts Cricket Club) made his T20 debut.

12 March 2021
Scorecard

Colts Cricket Club; 103 (19.1 overs)	v	Nondescripts Cricket Club; 105/2 (12.4 overs)
Santhush Gunathilake 22 (32); Ashian Daniel 3/12 (4 overs)		Chaturanga de Silva 46 (30); Kavishka Anjula 1/21 (2.4 overs)

Nondescripts Cricket Club won by 8 wickets
Colombo Cricket Club Ground, Colombo
Umpires: Niroshana Amarasinghe and Raveendra Wimalasiri

- Colts Cricket Club won the toss and elected to bat.

12 March 2021
Scorecard

Sri Lanka Ports Authority Cricket Club; 95/9 (20 overs)	v	Lankan Cricket Club; 98/3 (19.1 overs)
Irosh Samarasooriya 39 (42); Geeth Kumara 4/13 (4 overs)		Damitha Silva 41* (47); Ishan Abeysekara 2/23 (4 overs)

Lankan Cricket Club won by 7 wickets
Colombo Cricket Club Ground, Colombo
Umpires: Niroshana Amarasinghe and Raveendra Wimalasiri

- Lankan Cricket Club won the toss and elected to field.

13 March 2021
Scorecard

Lankan Cricket Club; 136/4 (20 overs)	v	Bloomfield Cricket and Athletic Club; 140/6 (19.1 overs)
Harsha Cooray 50* (58); Dilum Fernando 2/24 (4 overs)		Nipun Haggalla 57 (36); Damitha Silva 2/20 (4 overs)

Bloomfield Cricket and Athletic Club won by 4 wickets
FTZ Sports Complex, Katunayake
Umpires: Lyndon Hannibal and Shantha Fonseka

- Lankan Cricket Club won the toss and elected to bat.
- Dilum Fernando (Bloomfield Cricket and Athletic Club) made his T20 debut.

13 March 2021
Scorecard

Sri Lanka Air Force Sports Club; 153/8 (20 overs)	v	Sri Lanka Ports Authority Cricket Club; 143/7 (20 overs)
Ravindu Sembukuttige 46 (30); Ishan Abeysekara 3/24 (3 overs)		Irosh Samarasooriya 53 (31); Sanjaya Ranaweera 2/14 (3 overs)

Sri Lanka Air Force Sports Club won by 10 runs
FTZ Sports Complex, Katunayake
Umpires: Lyndon Hannibal and Shantha Fonseka

- Sri Lanka Ports Authority Cricket Club won the toss and elected to field.
- Dinitha Siriwardena (Sri Lanka Air Force Sports Club) and Rashmika Mevan (Sri Lanka Ports Authority Cricket Club) both made their T20 debuts.

=== Group C ===
4 March 2021
Scorecard

Sinhalese Sports Club; 148/8 (20 overs)	v	Kalutara Town Club; 121 (19.2 overs)
Krishan Sanjula 52 (40); Nipuna Kariyawasam 4/31 (4 overs)		Gihan Rupasinghe 36 (26); Jeffrey Vandersay 3/25 (4 overs)

Sinhalese Sports Club won by 27 runs
Colts Cricket Club Ground, Colombo
Umpires: Lyndon Hannibal and Niroshana Amarasinghe

- Kalutara Town Club won the toss and elected to field.
- Chamindu Wickramasinghe and Sohan de Livera (Sinhalese Sports Club), Bishan Mendis, Mohamed Shilmi and Wasantha Warnapura (Kalutara Town Club) all made their T20 debuts.

4 March 2021
Scorecard

Kurunegala Youth Cricket Club; 151/8 (20 overs)	v	Chilaw Marians Cricket Club; 135 (19.2 overs)
Dhanushka Dharmasiri 53 (44); Pulina Tharanga 2/22 (4 overs)		Kasun Vidura 36 (26); Nimasara Atharagalla 4/26 (2.2 overs)

Kurunegala Youth Cricket Club won by 16 runs
Colts Cricket Club Ground, Colombo
Umpires: Lyndon Hannibal and Niroshana Amarasinghe

- Kurunegala Youth Cricket Club won the toss and elected to bat.
- Muditha Premadasa, Naveen Gunawardene, Ruvin Peiris (Kurunegala Youth Cricket Club), Sandun Mendis and Raveen Yasas (Chilaw Marians Cricket Club) all made their T20 debuts.

5 March 2021
Scorecard

Kalutara Town Club; 111/9 (20 overs)	v	Chilaw Marians Cricket Club; 112/7 (16.1 overs)
Geshan Wimaladharma 53 (60); Pulina Tharanga 2/13 (4 overs)		Thikshila de Silva 38 (18); Inshaka Siriwardena 2/8 (2 overs)

Chilaw Marians Cricket Club won by 3 wickets
Nondescripts Cricket Club Ground, Colombo
Umpires: Kapila Kottahachchi and Saman Mohan de Silva

- Kalutara Town Club won the toss and elected to bat.

5 March 2021
Scorecard

Police Sports Club; 98/9 (20 overs)	v	Moors Sports Club; 99/4 (14.3 overs)
Asel Sigera 21* (20); Jeevan Mendis 3/13 (4 overs)		Mohammed Shamaaz 26* (29); Supun Madushanka 1/15 (2.3 overs)

Moors Sports Club won by 6 wickets
Nondescripts Cricket Club Ground, Colombo
Umpires: Kapila Kottahachchi and Saman Mohan de Silva

- Moors Sports Club won the toss and elected to field.
- Chathuranga Jayathilake, Kavindu Silva (Police Sports Club) and Mohammed Shamaaz (Moors Sports Club) all made their T20 debuts.

6 March 2021
Scorecard

Sinhalese Sports Club; 122 (19.3 overs)	v	Police Sports Club; 123/7 (20 overs)
Shammu Ashan 44 (38); Danal Hemananda 3/21 (3.3 overs)		Maduranga Zoysa 37 (38); Himesh Ramanayake 2/25 (4 overs)

Police Sports Club won by 3 wickets
Colts Cricket Club Ground, Colombo
Umpires: Ranganath Prasanna and Ranmore Martinesz

- Sinhalese Sports Club won the toss and elected to bat.
- Danal Hemananda (Police Sports Club) made his T20 debut.

6 March 2021
Scorecard

Moors Sports Club; 159/8 (20 overs)	v	Kurunegala Youth Cricket Club; 114/1 (14 overs)
Pasindu Sooriyabandara 33 (28); Randeera Ranasinghe 5/26 (4 overs)		Gayan Maneeshan 45 (33); Sachithra Serasinghe 1/26 (3 overs)

Kurunegala Youth Cricket Club won by 14 runs (DLS method)
Colts Cricket Club Ground, Colombo
Umpires: Ranganath Prasanna and Ranmore Martinesz

- Moors Sports Club won the toss and elected to bat.

7 March 2021
Scorecard

Kurunegala Youth Cricket Club; 161/5 (20 overs)	v	Kalutara Town Club; 106/9 (20 overs)
Muditha Premadasa 39* (37); Inshaka Siriwardena 2/28 (4 overs)		Pansilu Deshan 23 (28); Sameera Sadamal 2/15 (4 overs)

Kurunegala Youth Cricket Club won by 55 runs
FTZ Sports Complex, Katunayake
Umpires: Keerthi Bandara and Nilantha Semasinghe

- Kalutara Town Club won the toss and elected to field.
- Pansilu Deshan (Kalutara Town Club) made his T20 debut.

7 March 2021
Scorecard

Moors Sports Club; 156/6 (20 overs)	v	Sinhalese Sports Club; 159/3 (19.3 overs)
Pabasara Waduge 43 (39); Kalana Perera 2/18 (3 overs)		Nuwanidu Fernando 61* (46); Adeesha Thilanchana 2/21 (4 overs)

Sinhalese Sports Club won by 7 wickets
FTZ Sports Complex, Katunayake
Umpires: Keerthi Bandara and Nilantha Semasinghe

- Sinhalese Sports Club won the toss and elected to field.

9 March 2021
Scorecard

Chilaw Marians Cricket Club; 96 (20 overs)	v	Moors Sports Club; 97/3 (14.2 overs)
Pulina Tharanga 36 (36); Ranitha Liyanarachchi 4/27 (4 overs)		Mahela Udawatte 68* (45); Avindu Theekshana 2/23 (3 overs)

Moors Sports Club won by 7 wickets
Colts Cricket Club Ground, Colombo
Umpires: Saman Mohan de Silva and Susantha Dissanayake

- Moors Sports Club won the toss and elected to field.
- Dinuka Dilshan (Moors Sports Club) made his T20 debut.

9 March 2021
Scorecard

Kurunegala Youth Cricket Club; 127/6 (20 overs)	v	Sinhalese Sports Club; 128/3 (14.5 overs)
Ravindra Karunaratne 56 (33); Himesh Ramanayake 3/16 (4 overs)		Nuwanidu Fernando 39 (23); Lahiru Jayaratne 1/19 (3 overs)

Sinhalese Sports Club won by 7 wickets
Colts Cricket Club Ground, Colombo
Umpires: Saman Mohan de Silva and Susantha Dissanayake

- Kurunegala Youth Cricket Club won the toss and elected to bat.

10 March 2021
Scorecard

Chilaw Marians Cricket Club; 164/7 (20 overs)	v	Police Sports Club; 130/8 (20 overs)
Thikshila de Silva 54 (43); Malith de Silva 3/22 (4 overs)		Sujan Mayura 29 (22); Pulina Tharanga 3/23 (4 overs)

Chilaw Marians Cricket Club won by 34 runs
Colts Cricket Club Ground, Colombo
Umpires: Asanga Jayasooriya and Ranganath Prasanna

- Police Sports Club won the toss and elected to field.
- Charuka Tharindu, Naveen Fernando, Risira Weerasuriya and Sheshan Silva (Chilaw Marians Cricket Club) all made their T20 debuts.

12 March 2021
Scorecard

Chilaw Marians Cricket Club; 124/5 (20 overs)	v	Sinhalese Sports Club; 127/3 (17.4 overs)
Kasun Vidura 50 (44); Kalana Perera 2/21 (3 overs)		Nipun Dananjaya 80* (56); Sheshan Silva 1/17 (3 overs)

Sinhalese Sports Club won by 7 wickets
Colts Cricket Club Ground, Colombo
Umpires: Chamara de Soysa and Kumar Dharmasena

- Sinhalese Sports Club won the toss and elected to field.

12 March 2021
Scorecard

Kalutara Town Club; 108/8 (20 overs)	v	Police Sports Club; 113/3 (13.2 overs)
Gihan Rupasinghe 33 (25); Sujan Mayura 3/19 (4 overs)		Asel Sigera 44* (34); Nilanka Sandakan 2/35 (4 overs)

Police Sports Club won by 7 wickets
Colts Cricket Club Ground, Colombo
Umpires: Chamara de Soysa and Kumar Dharmasena

- Kalutara Town Club won the toss and elected to bat.
- Kanagarathinam Kabilraj (Police Sports Club) and Krishantha Sandaruwan (Kalutara Town Club) both made their T20 debuts.

13 March 2021
Scorecard

Kurunegala Youth Cricket Club; 155/3 (20 overs)	v	Police Sports Club; 155/8 (20 overs)
Gayan Maneeshan 85* (64); Lahiru Diyantha 2/23 (3 overs)		Maduranga Zoysa 62 (43); Nimasara Atharagalla 3/27 (3 overs)

Match tied
Colombo Cricket Club Ground, Colombo
Umpires: Gamini Dissanayake and Thilak Fernando

- Kurunegala Youth Cricket Club won the toss and elected to bat.
- Aveesha Keshan (Kurunegala Youth Cricket Club) made his T20 debut.

13 March 2021
Scorecard

Kalutara Town Club; 74 (13.5 overs)	v	Moors Sports Club; 75/2 (8.4 overs)
Tharaka Waduge 23 (20); Jeevan Mendis 5/21 (3.5 overs)		Ranitha Liyanarachchi 39 (26); Mithun Jayawickrama 2/25 (3.4 overs)

Moors Sports Club won by 8 wickets
Colombo Cricket Club Ground, Colombo
Umpires: Gamini Dissanayake and Thilak Fernando

- Kalutara Town Club won the toss and elected to bat.
- Dhanushka Udara (Moors Sports Club) made his T20 debut.

=== Group D ===
4 March 2021
Scorecard

Sri Lanka Navy Sports Club; 87/9 (20 overs)	v	Ragama Cricket Club; 88/6 (17.4 overs)
Chanaka Ruwansiri 24 (28); Ishan Jayaratne 3/20 (4 overs)		Nishan Madushka 27 (36); Dilanka Auwardt 2/17 (4 overs)

Ragama Cricket Club won by 4 wickets
Nondescripts Cricket Club Ground, Colombo
Umpires: Nilan De Silva and Sanjeewa Fernando

- Ragama Cricket Club won the toss and elected to field.
- Dulaj Ashen (Ragama Cricket Club), Pasindu Arachchige, Thushara Samarakoon and Ziya Mohamed (Sri Lanka Navy Sports Club) all made their T20 debuts.

4 March 2021
Scorecard

Sri Lanka Army Sports Club; 104 (19.3 overs)	v	Tamil Union Cricket and Athletic Club; 108/4 (17.5 overs)
Asela Gunaratne 34 (37); Shiran Fernando 3/17 (3.3 overs)		Sadeera Samarawickrama 52 (48); Maheesh Theekshana 2/13 (3 overs)

Tamil Union Cricket and Athletic Club won by 6 wickets
Nondescripts Cricket Club Ground, Colombo
Umpires: Nilan De Silva and Sanjeewa Fernando

- Tamil Union Cricket and Athletic Club won the toss and elected to bat.
- Ravindu Fernando (Tamil Union Cricket and Athletic Club) made his T20 debut.

5 March 2021
Scorecard

Sebastianites Cricket and Athletic Club; 69 (16 overs)	v	Ragama Cricket Club; 70/2 (9.5 overs)
Manelker De Silva 15 (23); Binura Fernando 3/8 (3 overs)		Dineth Thimodya 29* (20); Charith Rajapakshe 1/15 (2 overs)

Ragama Cricket Club won by 8 wickets
P Sara Oval, Colombo
Umpires: Rohitha Kottahachchi and Vidura Prasad

- Ragama Cricket Club won the toss and elected to field.
- Chamal Perera and Thamasha Fernando (Sebastianites Cricket and Athletic Club) both made their T20 debuts.

5 March 2021
Scorecard

Panadura Sports Club; 115 (19.3 overs)	v	Saracens Sports Club; 119/2 (19.4 overs)
Aruna Dharmasena 29 (25); Chaminda Bandara 3/22 (3.3 overs)		Charitha Kumarasinghe 61* (53); Nimesh Vimukthi 1/18 (4 overs)

Saracens Sports Club won by 8 wickets
P Sara Oval, Colombo
Umpires: Rohitha Kottahachchi and Vidura Prasad

- Saracens Sports Club won the toss and elected to field.
- Ashan Dilhara, Ashen Mendis, Chathuranga Dickkumbura, Koshen Jayawickrema and Shanuka Madushan (Panadura Sports Club) all made their T20 debuts.

6 March 2021
Scorecard

Saracens Sports Club; 137/5 (20 overs)	v	Tamil Union Cricket and Athletic Club; 88/4 (14 overs)
Thaveesha Kahaduwaarachchi 46 (40); Sachindu Colombage 1/16 (4 overs)		Sadeera Samarawickrama 40* (35); Promod Maduwantha 2/8 (2 overs)

Saracens Sports Club won by 3 runs (DLS method)
FTZ Sports Complex, Katunayake
Umpires: Keerthi Bandara and Upul Wewage

- Saracens Sports Club won the toss and elected to bat.
- Thaveesha Kahaduwaarachchi (Saracens Sports Club) made his T20 debut.

6 March 2021
Scorecard

Sri Lanka Navy Sports Club; 85 (19.5 overs)	v	Sri Lanka Army Sports Club; 87/1 (11.4 overs)
Chanaka Ruwansiri 30 (29); Janith Silva 4/10 (3.5 overs)		Ashan Randika 44 (25); Dilanka Auwardt 1/19 (4 overs)

Sri Lanka Army Sports Club won by 9 wickets
FTZ Sports Complex, Katunayake
Umpires: Keerthi Bandara and Upul Wewage

- Sri Lanka Army Sports Club won the toss and elected to field.

7 March 2021
Scorecard

Panadura Sports Club; 75 (17.3 overs)	v	Sri Lanka Army Sports Club; 76/3 (11.2 overs)
Koshan Dhanushka 25 (19); Yasoda Mendis 3/14 (3 overs)		Asela Gunaratne 31* (26); Charith Jayampathi 1/13 (2 overs)

Sri Lanka Army Sports Club won by 7 wickets
Nondescripts Cricket Club Ground, Colombo
Umpires: Prageeth Rambukwella and R P Massalage

- Sri Lanka Army Sports Club won the toss and elected to field.
- Hashan Chamara (Panadura Sports Club) made his T20 debut.

7 March 2021
Scorecard

Tamil Union Cricket and Athletic Club; 118 (19.1 overs)	v	Ragama Cricket Club; 119/8 (20 overs)
Yohan Mendis 25 (25); Binura Fernando 3/22 (4 overs)		Ishan Jayaratne 22 (17); Shiran Fernando 3/20 (4 overs)

Ragama Cricket Club won by 2 wickets
Nondescripts Cricket Club Ground, Colombo
Umpires: Prageeth Rambukwella and R P Massalage

- Ragama Cricket Club won the toss and elected to field.

9 March 2021
Scorecard

Saracens Sports Club; 161/5 (20 overs)	v	Sebastianites Cricket and Athletic Club; 150/8 (20 overs)
Hashan Dumindu 62 (36); Chathura Randunu 2/16 (3 overs)		Sachitha Jayathilake 43 (14); Hashen Ramanayake 3/26 (3 overs)

Saracens Sports Club won by 11 runs
Nondescripts Cricket Club Ground, Colombo
Umpires: Damith Sanjeewa and Deepal Gunawardene

- Sebastianites Cricket and Athletic Club won the toss and elected to field.

9 March 2021
Scorecard

Panadura Sports Club; 130/7 (20 overs)	v	Ragama Cricket Club; 88 (16.2 overs)
Nimesh Vimukthi 33* (15); Amila Aponso 2/19 (4 overs)		Ishan Jayaratne 29 (28); Chathura Peiris 2/12 (2.2 overs)

Panadura Sports Club won by 42 runs
Nondescripts Cricket Club Ground, Colombo
Umpires: Damith Sanjeewa and Deepal Gunawardene

- Ragama Cricket Club won the toss and elected to field.
- Dellon Peiris and Kalhara Senarathne (Ragama Cricket Club) both made their T20 debuts.

10 March 2021
Scorecard

Saracens Sports Club; 132/7 (19 overs)	v	Sri Lanka Navy Sports Club
Promod Maduwantha 23 (29); Buddika Madushan 3/24 (3 overs)

No result
FTZ Sports Complex, Katunayake
Umpires: Kapila Kottahachchi and Vidura Prasad

- Saracens Sports Club won the toss and elected to bat.
- Joanne de Zilva (Sri Lanka Navy Sports Club) made his T20 debut.

10 March 2021
Scorecard

Sebastianites Cricket and Athletic Club; 141/4 (20 overs)	v	Sri Lanka Army Sports Club; 143/3 (16.3 overs)
Sameen Kandanearachchi 55 (44); Asela Gunaratne 2/22 (4 overs)		Asela Gunaratne 58* (47); Charith Rajapakshe 2/15 (3 overs)

Sri Lanka Army Sports Club won by 7 wickets
FTZ Sports Complex, Katunayake
Umpires: Kapila Kottahachchi and Vidura Prasad

- Sri Lanka Army Sports Club won the toss and elected to field.

11 March 2021
Scorecard

Sebastianites Cricket and Athletic Club; 131 (20 overs)	v	Sri Lanka Navy Sports Club; 10/0 (2 overs)
Tharusha Fernando 30 (24); Ziya Mohamed 2/20 (4 overs)		Buddika Madushan 5* (3)

No result
Nondescripts Cricket Club Ground, Colombo
Umpires: Ravindra Kottahachchi and Saman Mohan de Silva

- Sebastianites Cricket and Athletic Club won the toss and elected to bat.
- Chamod Sandaru (Sri Lanka Navy Sports Club) made his T20 debut.

11 March 2021
Scorecard

Panadura Sports Club; 115 (19.2 overs)	v	Tamil Union Cricket and Athletic Club; 116/3 (14.4 overs)
Hans Fernando 26 (27); Shiran Fernando 3/21 (3.2 overs)		Sadeera Samarawickrama 43 (33); Yomesh Ranasinghe 1/25 (3 overs)

Tamil Union Cricket and Athletic Club won by 7 wickets
Nondescripts Cricket Club Ground, Colombo
Umpires: Ravindra Kottahachchi and Saman Mohan de Silva

- Tamil Union Cricket and Athletic Club won the toss and elected to field.

12 March 2021
Scorecard

Panadura Sports Club; 143/5 (20 overs)	v	Sri Lanka Navy Sports Club; 115 (18.3 overs)
Hashan Chamara 34 (34); Chanaka Ruwansiri 2/8 (2 overs)		Shalith Fernando 29 (25); Nimesh Vimukthi 3/14 (3.3 overs)

Panadura Sports Club won by 28 runs
P Sara Oval, Colombo
Umpires: Prageeth Rambukwella

- Panadura Sports Club won the toss and elected to bat.
- Kavindu Ashan (Panadura Sports Club) made his T20 debut.

12 March 2021
Scorecard

Sri Lanka Army Sports Club; 143/6 (20 overs)	v	Ragama Cricket Club; 112/8 (20 overs)
Asela Gunaratne 57 (42); Ishan Jayaratne 3/26 (4 overs)		Nishan Madushka 24 (25); Janith Silva 2/12 (4 overs)

Sri Lanka Army Sports Club won by 31 runs
P Sara Oval, Colombo
Umpires: Prageeth Rambukwella

- Ragama Cricket Club won the toss and elected to field.
- Sasika Dilshan (Sri Lanka Army Sports Club) and Shashika Dulshan (Ragama Cricket Club) both made their T20 debuts.

13 March 2021
Scorecard

Tamil Union Cricket and Athletic Club; 141/7 (20 overs)	v	Sebastianites Cricket and Athletic Club; 92 (20 overs)
Sithara Gimhan 32 (23); Sachitha Jayathilake 2/19 (4 overs)		Sacha De Alwis 31 (35); Shiran Fernando 4/19 (4 overs)

Tamil Union Cricket and Athletic Club won by 49 runs
Nondescripts Cricket Club Ground, Colombo
Umpires: Kamal Indrajith and Nilan De Silva

- Tamil Union Cricket and Athletic Club won the toss and elected to bat.
- Vihan Gunasekare (Sebastianites Cricket and Athletic Club) made his T20 debut.

13 March 2021
Scorecard

Saracens Sports Club; 116 (19.1 overs)	v	Ragama Cricket Club; 120/4 (19.2 overs)
Sanjaya Chathuranga 33 (28); Binura Fernando 3/22 (4 overs)		Nishan Madushka 58 (53); Ayana Siriwardhana 1/11 (2.2 overs)

Ragama Cricket Club won by 6 wickets
Nondescripts Cricket Club Ground, Colombo
Umpires: Kamal Indrajith and Nilan De Silva

- Saracens Sports Club won the toss and elected to bat.
- Manisha Rupasinghe (Ragama Cricket Club) made his T20 debut.

14 March 2021
Scorecard

Tamil Union Cricket and Athletic Club; 215/4 (20 overs)	v	Sri Lanka Navy Sports Club; 146/6 (20 overs)
Sadeera Samarawickrama 93 (50); Dilshan Lekamge 1/19 (2 overs)		Chanaka Ruwansiri 37 (23); Pramod Madushan 3/39 (4 overs)

Tamil Union Cricket and Athletic Club won by 69 runs
Nondescripts Cricket Club Ground, Colombo
Umpires: Mohan de Silva and Ruchira Palliyaguruge

- Tamil Union Cricket and Athletic Club won the toss and elected to bat.
- Amien Miflal (Sri Lanka Navy Sports Club) and Mirangara Wickramage (Tamil Union Cricket and Athletic Club) both made their T20 debuts.

14 March 2021
Scorecard

Sri Lanka Army Sports Club; 105/8 (20 overs)	v	Saracens Sports Club; 104/9 (20 overs)
Janith Silva 34* (35); Udith Madushan 2/19 (4 overs)		Thaveesha Kahaduwaarachchi 29 (35); Dushan Vimukthi 2/11 (3 overs)

Sri Lanka Army Sports Club won by 1 run
Colts Cricket Club Ground, Colombo
Umpires: Deepal Gunawardene and Susantha Dissanayake

- Saracens Sports Club won the toss and elected to field.
- Priyantha Rathnayake (Sri Lanka Army Sports Club) made his T20 debut.

14 March 2021
Scorecard

Panadura Sports Club; 122/8 (20 overs)	v	Sebastianites Cricket and Athletic Club; 114/9 (20 overs)
Hashan Chamara 29 (19); Tharusha Fernando 3/16 (4 overs)		Sameen Kandanearachchi 30 (20); Charith Jayampathi 4/26 (4 overs)

Panadura Sports Club won by 8 runs
Colts Cricket Club Ground, Colombo
Umpires: Deepal Gunawardene and Susantha Dissanayake

- Panadura Sports Club won the toss and elected to bat.
- Dulaj Dananjaya (Panadura Sports Club) made his T20 debut.

== Knockout stage ==
=== Quarterfinals ===
1st Quarterfinal
16 March 2021
Scorecard

Colombo Cricket Club; 150/5 (20 overs)	v	Ragama Cricket Club; 93 (17 overs)
Lasith Abeyratne 54 (38); Amila Aponso 2/16 (4 overs)		Janith Liyanage 29 (22); Malinda Pushpakumara 4/20 (4 overs)

Colombo Cricket Club won by 57 runs
P Sara Oval, Colombo
Umpires: Deepal Gunawardene and Rohitha Kottahachchi

- Ragama Cricket Club won the toss and elected to field.

2nd Quarterfinal
16 March 2021
Scorecard

Sri Lanka Army Sports Club; 164/5 (20 overs)	v	Negombo Cricket Club; 158/9 (20 overs)
Thulina Dilshan 39 (43); Dilshan Munaweera 2/20 (4 overs)		Dilshan Munaweera 59 (44); Heshan Hettiarchchi 5/38 (4 overs)

Sri Lanka Army won by 6 runs
Colombo Cricket Club Ground, Colombo
Umpires: Hemantha Boteju and Ranmore Martinesz

- Sri Lanka Army Sports Club won the toss and elected to bat.

3rd Quarterfinal
16 March 2021
Scorecard

Colts Cricket Club; 117 (19.4 overs)	v	Sinhalese Sports Club; 118/4 (17.2 overs)
Sangeeth Cooray 26 (29); Prabath Jayasuriya 4/16 (4 overs)		Nuwanidu Fernando 41 (43); Sangeeth Cooray 2/18 (2.2 overs)

Sinhalese Sports Club won by 6 wickets
Colombo Cricket Club Ground, Colombo
Umpires: Asanga Jayasooriya and Pradeep Udawatta

- Sinhalese Sports Club won the toss and elected to field.

4th Quarterfinal
16 March 2021
Scorecard

Kurunegala Youth Cricket Club; 155/5 (20 overs)	v	Nondescripts Cricket Club; 92 (14.4 overs)
Gayan Maneeshan 56 (48); Lahiru Kumara 4/17 (4 overs)		Angelo Perera 27 (18); Naveen Gunawardene 3/14 (2.4 overs)

Kurunegala Youth Cricket Club won by 63 runs
P Sara Oval, Colombo
Umpires: Gamini Dissanayake and Ravindra Kottahachchi

- Kurunegala Youth Cricket Club won the toss and elected to bat.

=== Finals ===
1st Semi-final
18 March 2021
Scorecard

Sinhalese Sports Club; 159/4 (20 overs)	v	Colombo Cricket Club; 127 (19.3 overs)
Avishka Fernando 65 (48); Malinda Pushpakumara 2/33 (4 overs)		Ron Chandraguptha 55 (45); Prabath Jayasuriya 3/16 (3.3 overs)

Sinhalese Sports Club won by 32 runs
Nondescripts Cricket Club Ground, Colombo
Umpires: Lyndon Hannibal and Prageeth Rambukwella

- Colombo Cricket Club won the toss and elected to field.

2nd Semi-final
18 March 2021
Scorecard

Kurunegala Youth Cricket Club; 114/6 (20 overs)	v	Sri Lanka Army Sports Club; 120/1 (11.4 overs)
Lahiru Jayaratne 34* (26); Janith Silva 3/15 (3 overs)		Ashan Randika 54* (31); Ruvin Peiris 1/20 (4 overs)

Sri Lanka Army Sports Club won by 9 wickets
Nondescripts Cricket Club Ground, Colombo
Umpires: Keerthi Bandara and Raveendra Wimalasiri

- Kurunegala Youth Cricket Club won the toss and elected to bat.

Final
20 March 2021
Scorecard

Sinhalese Sports Club; 146/5 (20 overs)	v	Sri Lanka Army Sports Club; 117 (19.2 overs)
Krishan Sanjula 71* (62); Heshan Hettiarchchi 2/27 (4 overs)		Ashan Randika 44 (35); Himesh Ramanayake 3/23 (2.2 overs)

Sinhalese Sports Club won by 29 runs
Sinhalese Sports Club Ground, Colombo
Umpires: Kumar Dharmasena and Ruchira Palliyaguruge

- Sinhalese Sports Club won the toss and elected to bat.
