= 2020–21 Major Clubs Limited Over Tournament =

Cricket tournament

- Dates: 24 March – 11 April 2021
- Administrator: Sri Lanka Cricket
- Cricket format: List A cricket
- Tournament format: Round-robin then knockout
- Host: Sri Lanka
- Champions: Nondescripts Cricket Club
- Participants: 26
- Matches: 79
- Most runs: Janith Liyanage (461)
- Most wickets: Binura Fernando (23)

The 2020–21 Major Clubs Limited Over Tournament was a List A cricket competition that took place in Sri Lanka. It ran from 24 March to 11 April 2021, with twenty-six teams taking part. Chilaw Marians Cricket Club were the defending champions, winning the 2019–20 Invitation Limited Over Tournament.

On 28 March 2021, in the Group A match between Sri Lanka Army Sports Club and Bloomfield Cricket and Athletic Club, Army Sports Club's captain Thisara Perera hit six sixes in one over off the bowling of Dilhan Cooray. Perera became the first Sri Lankan to achieve this in a domestic cricket match, and he also scored the second-fastest fifty in List A cricket.

Nondescripts Cricket Club and Ragama Cricket Club won their respective semi-final matches to advance to the final, with Nondescripts winning the match by 145 runs.

== Group stage ==
=== Group A ===
24 March 2021
Scorecard

Burgher Recreation Club; 112 (34.1 overs)	v	Sri Lanka Air Force Sports Club; 76 (23.5 overs)
Raminda Wijesooriya 35 (41); Anuk de Alwis 3/33 (8 overs)		Dinitha Siriwardena 14 (38); Mohamed Shiraz 5/34 (8.5 overs)

Burgher Recreation Club won by 36 runs
Air Force Ground, Katunayake
Umpires: Keerthi Bandara and Susantha Dissanayake

- Sri Lanka Air Force Sports Club won the toss and elected to field.
- Dinitha Siriwardena, Sandaruwan Chinthaka and Sanjaya Ranaweera (Sri Lanka Air Force Sports Club) all made their List A debuts.

24 March 2021
Scorecard

Sri Lanka Army Sports Club; 209 (47.5 overs)	v	Badureliya Sports Club; 99/3 (18.3 overs)
Thisara Perera 68 (61); Alankara Asanka Silva 2/29 (9.5 overs)		Sandun Weerakkody 70* (60); Suminda Lakshan 2/14 (5 overs)

No result
Surrey Village Cricket Ground, Maggona
Umpires: Deepal Gunawardene and Vidura Prasad

- Sri Lanka Army Sports Club won the toss and elected to bat.
- Dunith Jayatunga and Ruchira Koshitha (Badureliya Sports Club) both made their List A debuts.

24 March 2021
Scorecard

Bloomfield Cricket and Athletic Club; 274/8 (50 overs)	v	Colombo Cricket Club; 196 (39.2 overs)
Harsha Vithana 79 (94); Malinda Pushpakumara 3/52 (10 overs)		Chamindu Wijesinghe 48* (57); Usman Ishak 5/37 (8 overs)

Bloomfield Cricket and Athletic Club won by 78 runs
Colombo Cricket Club Ground, Colombo
Umpires: Chamara de Soysa and Lyndon Hannibal

- Colombo Cricket Club won the toss and elected to field.
- Chamindu Wijesinghe and Usman Ishak (Colombo Cricket Club) both made their List A debuts.

26 March 2021
Scorecard

Sri Lanka Army Sports Club; 175 (46.4 overs)	v	Burgher Recreation Club; 94 (34.1 overs)
Thisara Perera 58 (64); Chameera Dissanayake 3/23 (7 overs)		Nimesha Gunasinghe 38 (93); Dushan Vimukthi 3/27 (10 overs)

Sri Lanka Army Sports Club won by 81 runs
Burgher Recreation Club Ground, Colombo
Umpires: Hemantha Boteju and Ranganath Prasanna

- Burgher Recreation Club won the toss and elected to field.

26 March 2021
Scorecard

Colombo Cricket Club; 255 (49.2 overs)	v	Badureliya Sports Club; 181/4 (38 overs)
Ron Chandraguptha 96 (115); Alankara Asanka Silva 3/50 (10 overs)		Sandun Weerakkody 121 (115); Sonal Dinusha 2/24 (7 overs)

Badureliya Sports Club won by 10 runs (DLS method)
Surrey Village Cricket Ground, Maggona
Umpires: Prageeth Rambukwella and Susantha Dissanayake

- Badureliya Sports Club won the toss and elected to field.

26 March 2021
Scorecard

Sri Lanka Air Force Sports Club; 161 (44.4 overs)	v	Kandy Customs Cricket Club; 163/5 (31.2 overs)
Ravindu Sembukuttige 37 (39); Umega Chaturanga 4/33 (10 overs)		Chanaka Wijesinghe 76* (78); Asantha Singappuli 2/36 (10 overs)

Kandy Customs Cricket Club won by 5 wickets
Air Force Ground, Katunayake
Umpires: Gamini Dissanayake and Sisira Kumara

- Kandy Customs Cricket Club won the toss and elected to field.
- Sajith Priyal and Sasith Manuranga (Kandy Customs Cricket Club) both made their List A debuts.

28 March 2021
Scorecard

Colombo Cricket Club; 303/5 (49 overs)	v	Kandy Customs Cricket Club; 91 (30.1 overs)
Lasith Abeyratne 100* (93); Sachithra Perera 2/44 (8 overs)		Hasitha Nirmal 20 (24); Malinda Pushpakumara 3/21 (10 overs)

Colombo Cricket Club won by 212 runs
Colombo Cricket Club Ground, Colombo
Umpires: Kamal Indrajith and Ranmore Martinesz

- Colombo Cricket Club won the toss and elected to bat.
- Lahiru Vilochana (Kandy Customs Cricket Club) made his List A debut.

28 March 2021
Scorecard

Sri Lanka Air Force Sports Club; 143 (41.4 overs)	v	Badureliya Sports Club; 144/4 (36.4 overs)
Kalana Wijesiri 44 (61); Tillakaratne Sampath 3/25 (9 overs)		Dilshan de Soysa 55* (112); Anuk de Alwis 2/34 (10 overs)

Badureliya Sports Club won by 6 wickets
Air Force Ground, Katunayake
Umpires: Nalliah Devarajan and Nilan De Silva

- Badureliya Sports Club won the toss and elected to field.
- Kalana Wijesiri, Kalindu Siriwardana and Kasun Ekanayake (Sri Lanka Air Force Sports Club) all made their List A debuts.

28 March 2021
Scorecard

Sri Lanka Army Sports Club; 318/3 (41 overs)	v	Bloomfield Cricket and Athletic Club; 73/6 (17 overs)
Ashan Randika 124 (116); Usman Ishak 2/67 (9 overs)		Kasun Ekanayake 36* (43); Dushan Vimukthi 3/16 (6 overs)

No result
Army Ground, Panagoda
Umpires: Kapila Kottahachchi and Pradeep Udawatta

- Sri Lanka Army Sports Club won the toss and elected to bat.
- Priyantha Rathnayake (Sri Lanka Army Sports Club) made his List A debut.

30 March 2021
Scorecard

Burgher Recreation Club; 119 (30.5 overs)	v	Colombo Cricket Club; 122/4 (17.2 overs)
Lahiru Samarakoon 50 (27); Malinda Pushpakumara 3/21 (6.5 overs)		Ron Chandraguptha 44 (45); Umeshka Morais 1/11 (3 overs)

Colombo Cricket Club won by 6 wickets
Burgher Recreation Club Ground, Colombo
Umpires: Gamini Dissanayake and Prageeth Rambukwella

- Colombo Cricket Club won the toss and elected to field.

30 March 2021
Scorecard

Bloomfield Cricket and Athletic Club; 205/8 (50 overs)	v	Sri Lanka Air Force Sports Club; 171 (43.1 overs)
Sachin Jayawardena 85 (112); Anuk de Alwis 2/23 (10 overs)		Asantha Singappuli 69 (91); Gayan Sirisoma 3/15 (9 overs)

Bloomfield Cricket and Athletic Club won by 34 runs
Air Force Ground, Katunayake
Umpires: Asanga Jayasooriya and Nilantha Semasinghe

- Bloomfield Cricket and Athletic Club won the toss and elected to bat.

30 March 2021
Scorecard

Kandy Customs Cricket Club; 116 (33.2 overs)	v	Sri Lanka Army Sports Club; 117/3 (21.5 overs)
Sajith de Silva 28 (36); Maheesh Theekshana 3/16 (7.2 overs)		Himasha Liyanage 52* (48); Sampath Perera 2/35 (6 overs)

Sri Lanka Army Sports Club won by 7 wickets
Army Ground, Panagoda
Umpires: Ruchira Palliyaguruge and Sisira Kumara

- Kandy Customs Cricket Club won the toss and elected to bat.
- Arul Prakash (Kandy Customs Cricket Club) and Samitha Dilshan (Sri Lanka Army Sports Club) both made their List A debuts.

1 April 2021
Scorecard

Burgher Recreation Club; 192 (49.1 overs)	v	Kandy Customs Cricket Club; 193/9 (49.3 overs)
Shasheen Fernando 55 (82); Umega Chaturanga 3/25 (10 overs)		Vishva Wijeratne 34 (72); Lasith Lakshan 3/40 (10 overs)

Kandy Customs Cricket Club won by 1 wicket
Burgher Recreation Club Ground, Colombo
Umpires: Chaminda Hathurusingha and Raveendra Wimalasiri

- Burgher Recreation Club won the toss and elected to bat.
- Malinda Abhishek (Burgher Recreation Club) made his List A debut.

1 April 2021
Scorecard

Sri Lanka Air Force Sports Club; 154 (45.3 overs)	v	Colombo Cricket Club; 157/2 (19.5 overs)
Kalana Wijesiri 43 (83); Wanindu Hasaranga 5/38 (8.5 overs)		Kusal Mendis 81* (52); Sanjaya Ranaweera 1/47 (6.5 overs)

Colombo Cricket Club won by 8 wickets
Colombo Cricket Club Ground, Colombo
Umpires: Deepal Gunawardene and Dammika Rajapakse

- Colombo Cricket Club won the toss and elected to field.

1 April 2021
Scorecard

Bloomfield Cricket and Athletic Club; 289/9 (50 overs)	v	Badureliya Sports Club; 292/4 (47.3 overs)
Nipun Haggalla 151 (156); Buddika Sanjeewa 4/44 (6 overs)		Gamindu Kanishka 77* (78); Mishen Silva 2/51 (9 overs)

Badureliya Sports Club won by 6 wickets
Bloomfield Cricket and Athletic Club Ground, Colombo
Umpires: Lyndon Hannibal and Sisira Kumara

- Badureliya Sports Club won the toss and elected to field.

3 April 2021
Scorecard

Sri Lanka Air Force Sports Club; 110 (32 overs)	v	Sri Lanka Army Sports Club; 114/2 (13.1 overs)
Ashintha Malshan 26* (36); Maheesh Theekshana 4/40 (10 overs)		Ashan Randika 54* (37); Sanjaya Ranaweera 1/20 (4 overs)

Sri Lanka Army Sports Club won by 8 wickets
Army Ground, Panagoda
Umpires: Vidura Prasad and Pradeep Udawatta

- Sri Lanka Army Sports Club won the toss and elected to field.

3 April 2021
Scorecard

Burgher Recreation Club; 353/5 (50 overs)	v	Bloomfield Cricket and Athletic Club; 163 (29.4 overs)
Dushan Hemantha 100* (73); Dilum Fernando 2/76 (8 overs)		Kasun Ekanayake 49 (48); Umeshka Morais 7/46 (9.4 overs)

Burgher Recreation Club won by 190 runs
Bloomfield Cricket and Athletic Club Ground, Colombo
Umpires: Kapila Kottahachchi and Ranmore Martinesz

- Burgher Recreation Club won the toss and elected to bat.

3 April 2021
Scorecard

Badureliya Sports Club; 258 (46.2 overs)	v	Kandy Customs Cricket Club; 167 (45 overs)
Milinda Siriwardana 112 (112); Umega Chaturanga 4/54 (10 overs)		Hasitha Nirmal 39 (43); Chamikara Edirisinghe 2/15 (8 overs)

Badureliya Sports Club won by 91 runs
Navy Ground, Welisara
Umpires: Chaminda Hathurusingha and Asanga Jayasooriya

- Kandy Customs Cricket Club won the toss and elected to field.
- Tharindu Gamage (Kandy Customs Cricket Club) made his List A debut.

5 April 2021
Scorecard

Sri Lanka Army Sports Club; 286/8 (50 overs)	v	Colombo Cricket Club; 178 (39.5 overs)
Himasha Liyanage 92 (119); Lahiru Gamage 2/35 (6 overs)		Ashan Priyanjan 57 (65); Seekkuge Prasanna 3/33 (6.5 overs)

Sri Lanka Army Sports Club won by 108 runs
Colombo Cricket Club Ground, Colombo
Umpires: Gamini Dissanayake and Ranmore Martinesz

- Colombo Cricket Club won the toss and elected to field.

5 April 2021
Scorecard

Bloomfield Cricket and Athletic Club; 331/5 (50 overs)	v	Kandy Customs Cricket Club; 171 (34.3 overs)
Nipun Haggalla 81 (80); Imesh Madushanka 2/42 (4 overs)		Sampath Perera 66 (45); Dileepa Jayalath 3/5 (4 overs)

Bloomfield Cricket and Athletic Club won by 160 runs
Bloomfield Cricket and Athletic Club Ground, Colombo
Umpires: Lyndon Hannibal and Nilan De Silva

- Bloomfield Cricket and Athletic Club won the toss and elected to bat.
- Chilan Kalindu (Bloomfield Cricket and Athletic Club) made his List A debut.

5 April 2021
Scorecard

Burgher Recreation Club; 169 (46 overs)	v	Badureliya Sports Club; 172/1 (24.2 overs)
Leo Fransisco 50 (90); Buddika Sanjeewa 2/13 (4 overs)		Sandun Weerakkody 96 (77); Anuk Fernando 1/25 (2.22 overs)

Badureliya Sports Club won by 9 wickets
Surrey Village Cricket Ground, Maggona
Umpires: Chaturan Sanjeewa and Pradeep Udawatta

- Badureliya Sports Club won the toss and elected to field.
- Thamindu Wickramarachchi (Badureliya Sports Club) made his List A debut.

=== Group B ===
24 March 2021
Scorecard

Panadura Sports Club; 220 (47.2 overs)	v	Sri Lanka Navy Sports Club; 154/4 (28 overs)
Koshan Dhanushka 41 (28); Buddika Madushan 3/34 (8.2 overs)		Aravinda Akurugoda 63 (71); Nimesh Vimukthi 2/38 (8 overs)

Sri Lanka Navy Sports Club won by 35 runs (DLS method)
Panadura Esplanade, Panadura
Umpires: Raveendra Wimalasiri and Sisira Kumara

- Sri Lanka Navy Sports Club won the toss and elected to field.
- Chamod Battage, Chamod Sandaru, Thushara Samarakoon (Sri Lanka Navy Sports Club), Hashan Chamara and Nimantha Peiris (Panadura Sports Club) all made their List A debuts.

24 March 2021
Scorecard

Chilaw Marians Cricket Club; 241/5 (41 overs)	v	Galle Cricket Club; 240 (41 overs)
Kasun Vidura 107* (102); Ravishka Wijesiri 2/40 (6 overs)		Eranga Rathnayake 59 (60); Thikshila de Silva 3/36 (9 overs)

Chilaw Marians Cricket Club won by 1 run
Galle International Stadium, Galle
Umpires: Rohitha Kottahachchi and Saman Mohan de Silva

- Galle Cricket Club won the toss and elected to field.
- Charuka Tharindu (Chilaw Marians Cricket Club) and Thisara Dilshan (Galle Cricket Club) both made their List A debuts.

24 March 2021
Scorecard

Lankan Cricket Club; 229/8 (50 overs)	v	Ragama Cricket Club; 222/5 (44 overs)
Geeth Kumara 73* (74); Binura Fernando 2/35 (10 overs)		Ishan Jayaratne 105* (72); Sanjika Ridma 2/39 (10 overs)

Ragama Cricket Club won by 35 runs (DLS method)
Thurstan College Ground, Colombo
Umpires: Ravindra Kottahachchi and Sanjeewa Fernando

- Ragama Cricket Club won the toss and elected to field.
- Kalhara Senarathne, Manisha Rupasinghe (Ragama Cricket Club) and Sandun Abeyawardhana (Lankan Cricket Club) all made their List A debuts.

26 March 2021
Scorecard

Galle Cricket Club; 218 (46.4 overs)	v	Panadura Sports Club; 209/4 (39 overs)
Imesh Udayanga 40 (52); Charith Jayampathi 3/24 (4.4 overs)		Aruna Dharmasena 112* (94); Chalana de Silva 2/18 (10 overs)

Panadura Sports Club won by 55 runs (DLS method)
Panadura Esplanade, Panadura
Umpires: Pradeep Udawatta and Vidura Prasad

- Galle Cricket Club won the toss and elected to bat.
- Chathura Lakshan, Harshajith Rushan (Galle Cricket Club), Kavindu Ashan and Kosala Ravindu (Panadura Sports Club) all made their List A debuts.

26 March 2021
Scorecard

Chilaw Marians Cricket Club; 271/9 (50 overs)	v	Lankan Cricket Club; 267 (49.3 overs)
Rumesh Buddika 54 (81); Damitha Silva 2/43 (10 overs)		Damitha Silva 118 (135); Thikshila de Silva 3/59 (8 overs)

Chilaw Marians Cricket Club won by 4 runs
FTZ Sports Complex, Katunayake
Umpires: Deepal Gunawardene and Eric Kannangara

- Chilaw Marians Cricket Club won the toss and elected to bat.

26 March 2021
Scorecard

Sri Lanka Navy Sports Club; 208/9 (50 overs)	v	Ragama Cricket Club; 212/8 (48.1 overs)
Buddika Madushan 67 (64); Shashika Dulshan 3/28 (10 overs)		Nishan Madushka 44 (54); Chamod Battage 3/28 (5 overs)

Ragama Cricket Club won by 2 wickets
Navy Ground, Welisara
Umpires: Keerthi Bandara and Saman Mohan de Silva

- Ragama Cricket Club won the toss and elected to field.
- Shashika Dulshan (Ragama Cricket Club) made his List A debut.

28 March 2021
Scorecard

Panadura Sports Club	v	Lankan Cricket Club

Match abandoned
Panadura Esplanade, Panadura
Umpires: Rohitha Kottahachchi and Thilak Fernando

- No toss.
- No play was possible due to a wet outfield.

28 March 2021
Scorecard

Ragama Cricket Club; 178 (42 overs)	v	Chilaw Marians Cricket Club; 139 (36.2 overs)
Janith Liyanage 82 (118); Charuka Tharindu 6/35 (10 overs)		Dasun Senevirathna 32 (38); Janaka Sampath 2/14 (6 overs)

Ragama Cricket Club won by 39 runs
FTZ Sports Complex, Katunayake
Umpires: Keerthi Bandara and Nilantha Semasinghe

- Ragama Cricket Club won the toss and elected to bat.

28 March 2021
Scorecard

Galle Cricket Club; 218 (48.3 overs)	v	Sri Lanka Navy Sports Club; 156 (39.5 overs)
Eranga Rathnayake 51 (79); Buddika Madushan 4/35 (10 overs)		Tharushan Iddamalgoda 50 (80); Chalana de Silva 3/39 (10 overs)

Galle Cricket Club won by 62 runs
Galle International Stadium, Galle
Umpires: Eric Kannangara and Ravindra Kottahachchi

- Galle Cricket Club won the toss and elected to bat.
- Bhagya Ediriweera (Sri Lanka Navy Sports Club) made his List A debut.

30 March 2021
Scorecard

Panadura Sports Club; 208 (38.4 overs)	v	Ragama Cricket Club; 211/3 (37.5 overs)
Koshan Dhanushka 67 (53); Binura Fernando 6/28 (10 overs)		Nishan Madushka 82 (102); Iwanka Sanjula 2/53 (10 overs)

Ragama Cricket Club won by 7 wickets
Bloomfield Cricket and Athletic Club Ground, Colombo
Umpires: Chamara de Soysa and Lyndon Hannibal

- Panadura Sports Club won the toss and elected to bat.
- Dellon Peiris (Ragama Cricket Club) made his List A debut.

30 March 2021
Scorecard

Chilaw Marians Cricket Club; 240/8 (50 overs)	v	Sri Lanka Navy Sports Club; 241/7 (49.2 overs)
Kamindu Mendis 67 (105); Buddika Madushan 4/39 (10 overs)		Chanaka Ruwansiri 51 (43); Lasith Croospulle 2/24 (10 overs)

Sri Lanka Navy Sports Club won by 3 wickets
Navy Ground, Welisara
Umpires: Rohitha Kottahachchi and Shantha Fonseka

- Chilaw Marians Cricket Club won the toss and elected to bat.

30 March 2021
Scorecard

Lankan Cricket Club; 192 (49.3 overs)	v	Galle Cricket Club; 193/6 (44.4 overs)
Risith Upamal 41 (65); Chathura Lakshan 3/24 (10 overs)		Raju Gayashan 52 (61); Damitha Silva 2/35 (10 overs)

Galle Cricket Club won by 4 wickets
Surrey Village Cricket Ground, Maggona
Umpires: Deepal Gunawardene and Vidura Prasad

- Galle Cricket Club won the toss and elected to field.

1 April 2021
Scorecard

Chilaw Marians Cricket Club; 320/8 (50 overs)	v	Panadura Sports Club; 156 (43.3 overs)
Lasith Croospulle 119 (111); Nimesh Vimukthi 4/63 (9 overs)		Sanoj Darshika 51* (86); Pulina Tharanga 3/22 (9 overs)

Chilaw Marians Cricket Club won by 164 runs
FTZ Sports Complex, Katunayake
Umpires: Ranganath Prasanna and Pradeep Udawatta

- Panadura Sports Club won the toss and elected to field firs.
- Kaumal Nanayakkara (Panadura Sports Club) made his List A debut.

1 April 2021
Scorecard

Ragama Cricket Club; 266/5 (49 overs)	v	Galle Cricket Club; 134 (32.4 overs)
Janith Liyanage 102* (101); Chalana de Silva 2/42 (10 overs)		Vinura Dulsara 57* (84); Ishan Jayaratne 4/53 (9.4 overs)

Ragama Cricket Club won by 132 runs
Thurstan College Ground, Colombo
Umpires: Kapila Kottahachchi and Ruchira Palliyaguruge

- Galle Cricket Club won the toss and elected to field.
- Yash Arora (Galle Cricket Club) made his List A debut.

1 April 2021
Scorecard

Lankan Cricket Club; 142 (46 overs)	v	Sri Lanka Navy Sports Club; 143/5 (20.3 overs)
Geeth Kumara 72 (127); Chanaka Ruwansiri 3/26 (10 overs)		Chanaka Ruwansiri 45* (28); Keshan Wijerathne 2/33 (6 overs)

Sri Lanka Navy Sports Club won by 5 wickets
Navy Ground, Welisara
Umpires: Kamal Indrajith and Prageeth Rambukwella

- Sri Lanka Navy Sports Club won the toss and elected to field.
- Methsith Jayamanna and Kevin Perera (Lankan Cricket Club) both made their List A debuts.

=== Group C ===
24 March 2021
Scorecard

Tamil Union Cricket and Athletic Club; 292/7 (49 overs)	v	Kalutara Town Club; 126/8 (37 overs)
Sithara Gimhan 62 (69); R Punchihewa 2/72 (10 overs)		Gihan Rupasinghe 21* (33); Pramod Madushan 3/30 (6 overs)

Tamil Union Cricket and Athletic Club won by 134 (DLS method)
P Sara Oval, Colombo
Umpires: Asanga Jayasooriya and Krishantha Rodrigo

- Kalutara Town Club won the toss and elected to field.
- Bhagya Palihawadana, Lahiru Hiranya (Kalutara Town Club) and Ravindu Rasantha (Tamil Union Cricket and Athletic Club) all made their List A debuts.

24 March 2021
Scorecard

Nondescripts Cricket Club; 375/5 (50 overs)	v	Nugegoda Sports and Welfare Club; 211 (40.3 overs)
Hasitha Boyagoda 101 (120); Vikum Sanjaya 2/61 (9 overs)		Pramud Hettiwatte 36 (40); Angelo Perera 3/50 (10 overs)

Nondescripts Cricket Club won by 164 runs
Nondescripts Cricket Club Ground, Colombo
Umpires: Kapila Kottahachchi and Prageeth Rambukwella

- Nondescripts Cricket Club won the toss and elected to bat.
- Ashian Daniel, Kamil Mishara (Nondescripts Cricket Club), Muditha Lakshan and Sakuna Liyanage (Nugegoda Sports and Welfare Club) all made their List A debuts.

24 March 2021
Scorecard

Negombo Cricket Club; 224 (47.1 overs)	v	Ace Capital Cricket Club; 182 (40 overs)
Angelo Jayasinghe 77 (101); Kavindu Ridmal 4/48 (8.1 overs)		Ishan Rangana 26 (29); Nishan Peiris 3/29 (9 overs)

Negombo Cricket Club won by 42 runs
FTZ Sports Complex, Katunayake
Umpires: Nilan De Silva and Thilak Fernando

- Ace Capital Cricket Club won the toss and elected to field.
- Kavindu Ridmal (Ace Capital Cricket Club) made his List A debut.

26 March 2021
Scorecard

Negombo Cricket Club; 214/9 (50 overs)	v	Nugegoda Sports and Welfare Club; 140/4 (28 overs)
Ashen Silva 53 (91); Lahiru Jayakody 2/17 (7 overs)		Hasitha Perera 42 (51); Madawa Warnapura 2/12 (5 overs)

Nugegoda Sports and Welfare Club won by 25 runs (DLS method)
Army Ground, Mattegoda
Umpires: Ranjith Vishwakula and Rohitha Kottahachchi

- Negombo Cricket Club won the toss and elected to bat.
- Hasitha Perera and Vimukthi Kulatunga (Nugegoda Sports and Welfare Club) both made their List A debuts.

26 March 2021
Scorecard

Nondescripts Cricket Club; 269/6 (49 overs)	v	Kalutara Town Club; 110 (28 overs)
Kamil Mishara 102* (130); Inshaka Siriwardena 3/54 (10 overs)		Lahiru Hiranya 50* (60); Ashian Daniel 3/19 (4 overs)

Nondescripts Cricket Club won by 159 runs
Arons Cricket Club Ground, Horana
Umpires: Asanga Jayasooriya and R P Massalage

- Nondescripts Cricket Club won the toss and elected to bat.
- Bishan Mendis (Kalutara Town Club) made his List A debut.

26 March 2021
Scorecard

Tamil Union Cricket and Athletic Club; 283/9 (47 overs)	v	Ace Capital Cricket Club; 92/6 (27 overs)
Isuru Udana 51 (25); Shashrika Pussegolla 3/44 (10 overs)		Irosh Samarasooriya 44 (57); Sachindu Colombage 2/15 (6 overs)

Tamil Union Cricket and Athletic Club won by 109 runs (DLS method)
Sri Lanka Army Ordnance Corps International Cricket Stadium, Horana
Umpires: Chamara de Soysa and Ruchira Palliyaguruge

- Ace Capital Cricket Club won the toss and elected to field.

28 March 2021
Scorecard

Kalutara Town Club; 164 (47.1 overs)	v	Nugegoda Sports and Welfare Club; 151/6 (32.2 overs)
Geshan Wimaladharma 46 (103); Muditha Lakshan 3/34 (8 overs)		Muditha Lakshan 46 (47); Nilanka Sandakan 3/39 (10 overs)

Nugegoda Sports and Welfare Club won by 34 runs (DLS method)
Surrey Village Cricket Ground, Maggona
Umpires: Chaminda Hathurusingha and Hemantha Boteju

- Kalutara Town Club won the toss and elected to bat.
- Likshan Sasanga (Kalutara Town Club) made his List A debut.

28 March 2021
Scorecard

Nondescripts Cricket Club; 260/9 (50 overs)	v	Ace Capital Cricket Club; 30 (19.3 overs)
Chamika Karunaratne 63* (51); Chanaka Komasaru 2/19 (10 overs)		Yohan de Silva 8 (15); Chaturanga de Silva 5/17 (9.3 overs)

Nondescripts Cricket Club won by 230 runs
Nondescripts Cricket Club Ground, Colombo
Umpires: Gamini Dissanayake and Vidura Prasad

- Nondescripts Cricket Club won the toss and elected to bat.

28 March 2021
Scorecard

Tamil Union Cricket and Athletic Club; 99 (27 overs)	v	Negombo Cricket Club; 100/5 (24.4 overs)
Manoj Sarathchandra 26 (33); Nisala Tharaka 4/23 (7 overs)		Angelo Jayasinghe 42 (54); Sachindu Colombage 2/20 (5.4 overs)

Negombo Cricket Club won by 5 wickets
P Sara Oval, Colombo
Umpires: Raveendra Wimalasiri and Sanjeewa Fernando

- Negombo Cricket Club won the toss and elected to field.
- Danushka Sandaruwan (Negombo Cricket Club) made his List A debut.

30 March 2021
Scorecard

Nondescripts Cricket Club; 177 (48.3 overs)	v	Negombo Cricket Club; 163 (47.1 overs)
Chaturanga de Silva 54 (64); Nishan Peiris 3/32 (10 overs)		Ashen Silva 54 (100); Yugeesha Dishan 4/25 (8 overs)

Nondescripts Cricket Club won by 14 runs
FTZ Sports Complex, Katunayake
Umpires: Krishantha Rodrigo and Nilan De Silva

- Nondescripts Cricket Club won the toss and elected to bat.
- Yugeesha Dishan (Nondescripts Cricket Club) made his List A debut.

30 March 2021
Scorecard

Nugegoda Sports and Welfare Club; 209/7 (50 overs)	v	Tamil Union Cricket and Athletic Club; 201/3 (36.4 overs)
Lahiru Jayakody 65 (88); Shiran Fernando 3/41 (10 overs)		Sadeera Samarawickrama 92* (101); Nipun Lakshan 2/55 (10 overs)

Tamil Union Cricket and Athletic Club won by 7 wickets
P Sara Oval, Colombo
Umpires: Ranjith Vishwakula and Raveendra Wimalasiri

- Nugegoda Sports and Welfare Club won the toss and elected to bat.
- Ranmith Jayasena and Ravindu Fernando (Tamil Union Cricket and Athletic Club) both made their List A debuts.

30 March 2021
Scorecard

Ace Capital Cricket Club; 214/5 (50 overs)	v	Kalutara Town Club; 215/4 (43.2 overs)
Ishan Rangana 68* (65); R Punchihewa 2/51 (10 overs)		Gihan Rupasinghe 117* (81); Chanaka Komasaru 1/16 (10 overs)

Kalutara Town Club won by 6 wickets
Arons Cricket Club Ground, Horana
Umpires: Pradeep Udawatta and R P Massalage

- Kalutara Town Club won the toss and elected to field.

1 April 2021
Scorecard

Nondescripts Cricket Club; 299/5 (50 overs)	v	Tamil Union Cricket and Athletic Club; 262/8 (50 overs)
Chaturanga de Silva 118* (96); Nuwan Pradeep 2/50 (10 overs)		Ravindu Fernando 71 (53); Chamika Karunaratne 4/28 (8 overs)

Nondescripts Cricket Club won by 37 runs
Nondescripts Cricket Club Ground, Colombo
Umpires: Ravindra Kottahachchi and Damith Sanjeewa

- Tamil Union Cricket and Athletic Club won the toss and elected to field.

1 April 2021
Scorecard

Kalutara Town Club; 199/9 (50 overs)	v	Negombo Cricket Club; 200/2 (37 overs)
Geshan Wimaladharma 42 (76); Upul Indrasiri 2/27 (10 overs)		Ashen Silva 78* (92); Denuwan Rajakaruna 1/41 (10 overs)

Negombo Cricket Club won by 8 wickets
Welagedara Stadium, Kurunegala
Umpires: Nilan De Silva and Upul Wewage

- Kalutara Town Club won the toss and elected to bat.

1 April 2021
Scorecard

Nugegoda Sports and Welfare Club; 143 (34.1 overs)	v	Ace Capital Cricket Club; 104 (29.2 overs)
Umesh Karunaratne 47 (59); Chanaka Komasaru 3/12 (8.1 overs)		Irosh Samarasooriya 37 (58); Umesh Karunaratne 4/28 (9 overs)

Nugegoda Sports and Welfare Club won by 39 runs
Sri Lanka Army Ordnance Corps International Cricket Stadium, Horana
Umpires: Rohitha Kottahachchi and Vidura Prasad

- Ace Capital Cricket Club won the toss and elected to field.
- Bishan Hettiarchchi, Navodya Imesh, Rashmika Mevan, Dilhara Polgampola, Sanka Purna (Ace Capital Cricket Club) and Kavindra Ishwara (Nugegoda Sports and Welfare Club) all made their List A debuts.

=== Group D ===
24 March 2021
Scorecard

Sinhalese Sports Club; 339/4 (50 overs)	v	Police Sports Club; 295/9 (48 overs)
Charith Asalanka 178* (145); Manjula Jayawardhana 2/62 (10 overs)		Supun Madushanka 89 (48); Prabath Jayasuriya 3/42 (10 overs)

Sinhalese Sports Club won by 31 runs (DLS method)
Sinhalese Sports Club Ground, Colombo
Umpires: Niroshana Amarasinghe and Ranmore Martinesz

- Police Sports Club won the toss and elected to field.
- Kanagarathinam Kabilraj, Saman Kumara (Police Sports Club) and Nipun Dananjaya (Sinhalese Sports Club) all made their List A debuts.

24 March 2021
Scorecard

Kurunegala Youth Cricket Club; 180/9 (47 overs)	v	Saracens Sports Club; 148/7 (41 overs)
Lahiru Jayaratne 29 (48); Chaminda Bandara 5/39 (10 overs)		Promod Maduwantha 45 (90); Nimasara Atharagalla 3/32 (9 overs)

Kurunegala Youth Cricket Club won by 6 runs (DLS method)
Welagedara Stadium, Kurunegala
Umpires: Hemantha Boteju and Shantha Fonseka

- Saracens Sports Club won the toss and elected to field.
- Muditha Premadasa and Nimasara Atharagalla (Kurunegala Youth Cricket Club) both made their List A debuts.

24 March 2021
Scorecard

Colts Cricket Club; 263/9 (50 overs)	v	Moors Sports Club; 176/9 (40.3 overs)
Jehan Daniel 79 (86); Dilesh Gunaratne 3/44 (10 overs)		Mahela Udawatte 63 (75); Sangeeth Cooray 3/39 (8 overs)

Colts Cricket Club won by 74 runs (DLS method)
Colts Cricket Club Ground, Colombo
Umpires: Dammika Rajapakse and Ruchira Palliyaguruge

- Moors Sports Club won the toss and elected to field.
- Mohammed Shamaaz (Moors Sports Club) made his List A debut.

26 March 2021
Scorecard

Sinhalese Sports Club; 295/9 (50 overs)	v	Sebastianites Cricket and Athletic Club; 148/7 (39 overs)
Nuwanidu Fernando 68 (64); Charith Rajapakshe 3/48 (10 overs)		Sachitha Jayathilake 31* (26); Prabath Jayasuriya 3/23 (8 overs)

Sinhalese Sports Club won by 95 runs (DLS method)
Sinhalese Sports Club Ground, Colombo
Umpires: Palitha de Alwis and Ravindra Kottahachchi

- Sebastianites Cricket and Athletic Club won the toss and elected to field.
- Romesh Nallaperuma, Sacha De Alwis and Suchira Paranathala (Sebastianites Cricket and Athletic Club) all made their List A debuts.

26 March 2021
Scorecard

Saracens Sports Club; 287/5 (50 overs)	v	Police Sports Club; 219 (44 overs)
Charitha Kumarasinghe 76 (75); Kanagarathinam Kabilraj 1/31 (4 overs)		Maduranga Zoysa 62 (81); Chaminda Bandara 4/34 (9 overs)

Saracens Sports Club won by 68 runs
Police Park Ground, Colombo
Umpires: Damith Sanjeewa and Lyndon Hannibal

- Police Sports Club won the toss and elected to field.

26 March 2021
Scorecard

Colts Cricket Club; 227 (49.1 overs)	v	Kurunegala Youth Cricket Club; 228/5 (43.4 overs)
Dhananjaya Lakshan 70 (91); Naveen Gunawardene 3/30 (8 overs)		Gayan Maneeshan 79* (76); Akila Dananjaya 2/42 (10 overs)

Kurunegala Youth Cricket Club won by 5 wickets
Welagedara Stadium, Kurunegala
Umpires: Kamal Indrajith and Nilan De Silva

- Colts Cricket Club won the toss and elected to bat.

28 March 2021
Scorecard

Sinhalese Sports Club; 293/5 (50 overs)	v	Kurunegala Youth Cricket Club; 130/7 (35 overs)
Sammu Ashan 107* (105); Randeera Ranasinghe 3/52 (8 overs)		Sameera Sadamal 35 (50); Jeffrey Vandersay 3/39 (10 overs)

Sinhalese Sports Club won by 108 runs (DLS method)
Sinhalese Sports Club Ground, Colombo
Umpires: Ruchira Palliyaguruge and Susantha Dissanayake

- Kurunegala Youth Cricket Club won the toss and elected to field.

28 March 2021
Scorecard

Moors Sports Club; 291 (50 overs)	v	Saracens Sports Club; 153/5 (34.1 overs)
Pabasara Waduge 133 (127); Udith Madushan 3/64 (10 overs)		Thaveesha Kahaduwaarachchi 42 (60); Milan Rathnayake 2/35 (7 overs)

Moors Sports Club won by 44 runs (DLS method)
De Soysa Stadium, Moratuwa
Umpires: Deepal Gunawardene and Sisira Kumara

- Saracens Sports Club won the toss and elected to field.
- Pasindu Sooriyabandara (Moors Sports Club) made his List A debut.

28 March 2021
Scorecard

Colts Cricket Club; 295/9 (50 overs)	v	Sebastianites Cricket and Athletic Club; 133/5 (30 overs)
Dhananjaya Lakshan 69 (79); Charith Rajapakshe 4/66 (9 overs)		Sameen Kandanearachchi 41 (56); Akila Dananjaya 3/26 (8 overs)

Colts Cricket Club won by 58 runs (DLS method)
Colts Cricket Club Ground, Colombo
Umpires: Asanga Jayasooriya and Ranganath Prasanna

- Colts Cricket Club won the toss and elected to bat.

30 March 2021
Scorecard

Moors Sports Club; 295/7 (50 overs)	v	Sinhalese Sports Club; 290/9 (50 overs)
Mahela Udawatte 116 (117); Kalana Perera 4/49 (10 overs)		Sammu Ashan 102 (95); Praveen Jayawickrama 3/65 (10 overs)

Moors Sports Club won by 5 runs
Sinhalese Sports Club Ground, Colombo
Umpires: Hemantha Boteju and Ranganath Prasanna

- Moors Sports Club won the toss and elected to bat.

30 March 2021
Scorecard

Saracens Sports Club; 276/5 (50 overs)	v	Sebastianites Cricket and Athletic Club; 178/9 (50 overs)
Hashan Dumindu 73 (94); Matheesha Perera 2/51 (10 overs)		Manelker De Silva 58* (81); Akash Senaratne 2/20 (10 overs)

Saracens Sports Club won by 98 runs
De Soysa Stadium, Moratuwa
Umpires: Niroshana Amarasinghe and Ravindra Kottahachchi

- Saracens Sports Club won the toss and elected to bat.

30 March 2021
Scorecard

Colts Cricket Club; 313/7 (50 overs)	v	Police Sports Club; 116 (26.1 overs)
Priyamal Perera 101 (95); Sujan Mayura 3/35 (10 overs)		Shehan Fernando 15 (20); Akila Dananjaya 4/22 (8 overs)

Colts Cricket Club won by 197 runs
Colts Cricket Club Ground, Colombo
Umpires: Kapila Kottahachchi and Ranmore Martinesz

- Colts Cricket Club won the toss and elected to bat.
- Avishka Perera (Colts Cricket Club) and Buddika Chathuranga (Police Sports Club) both made their List A debuts.

1 April 2021
Scorecard

Colts Cricket Club; 278/7 (50 overs)	v	Sinhalese Sports Club; 279/2 (38.4 overs)
Priyamal Perera 101* (91 overs); Kalana Perera 4/50 (10 overs)		Avishka Fernando 132 (106); Kavishka Anjula 1/33 (4 overs)

Sinhalese Sports Club won by 8 wickets
Sinhalese Sports Club Ground, Colombo
Umpires: Sanjeewa Fernando and Asanga Jayasooriya

- Colts Sports Club won the toss and elected to bat.

1 April 2021
Scorecard

Kurunegala Youth Cricket Club; 139 (33.5 overs)	v	Moors Sports Club; 140/5 (32.2 overs)
Ravindra Karunaratne 91 (99); Dilesh Gunaratne 4/33 (7.5 overs)		Mahela Udawatte 65 (88); Naveen Gunawardene 2/32 (10 overs)

Moors Cricket Club won by 5 wickets
P Sara Oval, Colombo
Umpires: Eric Kannangara and Ramone Martinesz

- Kurunegala Youth Cricket Club won the toss and elected to bat.

1 April 2021
Scorecard

Sebastianites Cricket and Athletic Club; 255 (50 overs)	v	Police Sports Club; 258/6 (48 overs)
Manelker De Silva 72 (102); Asel Sigera 5/34 (10 overs)		Supun Madushanka 65 (38); Chathura Randunu 3/56 (10 overs)

Police Sports Club won by 4 wickets
Police Park Ground, Colombo
Umpires: Hemantha Boteju and Saman Mohan de Silva

- Sebastianites Cricket and Athletic Club won the toss and elected to bat.
- Vijan Gunasekare (Sebastianites Cricket and Athletic Club) made his List A debut.

3 April 2021
Scorecard

Sinhalese Sports Club; 232 (49.1 overs)	v	Saracens Sports Club; 183/7 (50 overs)
Lakshitha Manasinghe 53 (64); Hashen Ramanayake 3/42 (9 overs)		Navindu Vithanage 50* (82); Prabath Jayasuriya 2/30 (10 overs)

Sinhalese Sports Club won by 49 runs
Sinhalese Sports Club Ground, Colombo
Umpires: Hemantha Boteju and Sisira Kumara

- Sinhalese Sports Club won the toss and elected to bat.

3 April 2021
Scorecard

Police Sports Club; 262 (49.1 overs)	v	Moors Sports Club; 100 (28.1 overs)
Mahela Udawatte 89 (105); Malith de Silva 2/41 (8 overs)		Asel Sigera 31 (33); Sachithra Serasinghe 5/24 (10 overs)

Moors Sports Club won by 162 runs
Police Park Ground, Colombo
Umpires: Kamal Indrajith and Prageeth Rambukwella

- Moors Sports Club won the toss and elected to bat.
- Ranjith Kumara (Police Sports Club) made his List A debut.

3 April 2021
Scorecard

Sebastianites Cricket and Athletic Club; 221 (49.5 overs)	v	Kurunegala Youth Cricket Club; 222/5 (42.2 overs)
Manelker De Silva 54 (85); Naveen Gunawardene 3/38 (10 overs)		Keshan Wanniarachchi 64 (95); Raveen Perera 2/35 (8.2 overs)

Kurunegala Youth Cricket Club won by 5 wickets
De Soysa Stadium, Moratuwa
Umpires: Thilak Fernando and Raveendra Wimalasiri

- Sebastianites Cricket and Athletic Club won the toss and elected to bat.
- Sachindra Perera (Kurunegala Youth Cricket Club) and Raveen Perera (Sebastianites Cricket and Athletic Club)

5 April 2021
Scorecard

Saracens Sports Club; 205/7 (50 overs)	v	Colts Cricket Club; 188 (45.3 overs)
Promod Maduwantha 82* (132); Harsha Rajapaksha 2/33 (9 overs)		Jehan Daniel 59 (52); Udith Madushan 2/30 (10 overs)

Saracens Sports Club won by 17 runs
Colts Cricket Club Ground, Colombo
Umpires: Asanga Jayasooriya and Ravindra Kottahachchi

- Saracens Sports Club won the toss and elected to bat.

5 April 2021
Scorecard

Kurunegala Youth Cricket Club; 327/6 (50 overs)	v	Police Sports Club; 226 (43.2 overs)
Sameera Sadamal 83 (51); Sujan Mayura 2/55 (8 overs)		Maduranga Zoysa 46 (43); Gihan Anjana 3/40 (8.2 overs)

Kurunegala Youth Cricket Club won by 101 runs
Welagedara Stadium, Kurunegala
Umpires: Keerthi Bandara and Nilantha Semasinghe

- Kurunegala Youth Cricket Club won the toss and elected to bat.
- Gihan Anjana (Kurunegala Youth Cricket Club) and Nadeera Balasooriya (Police Sports Club) both made their List A debuts.

5 April 2021
Scorecard

Moors Sports Club; 236/9 (50 overs)	v	Sebastianites Cricket and Athletic Club; 209 (46.3 overs)
Kavindu Kulasekara 75 (87); Matheesha Perera 3/41 (10 overs)		Sameen Kandanearachchi 59 (54); Dilesh Gunaratne 3/16 (7.3 overs)

Moors Sports Club won by 27 runs
Nondescripts Cricket Club Ground, Colombo
Umpires: Hemantha Boteju and Rohitha Kottahachchi

- Sebastianites Cricket and Athletic Club won the toss and elected to field.

== Knockout stage ==
=== Quarterfinals ===
1st Quarterfinal
7 April 2021
Scorecard

Moors Sports Club; 154 (41.3 overs)	v	Badureliya Sports Club; 157/3 (25.5 overs)
Jeevan Mendis 38 (58); Tillakaratne Sampath 4/26 (6.3 overs)		Sandun Weerakkody 70 (57); Sachithra Serasinghe 3/57 (10 overs)

Badureliya Sports Club won by 7 wickets
Tyronne Fernando Stadium, Moratuwa
Umpires: Hemantha Boteju and Ravindra Kottahachchi

- Badureliya Sports Club won the toss and elected to field.
- Dinuka Dilshan (Moors Sports Club) made his List A debut.

2nd Quarterfinal
7 April 2021
Scorecard

Tamil Union Cricket and Athletic Club; 255/9 (50 overs)	v	Ragama Cricket Club; 256/4 (46 overs)
Yohan Mendis 75 (84); Binura Fernando 3/47 (8 overs)		Janith Liyanage 91 (113); Isuru Udana 2/37 (9 overs)

Ragama Cricket Club won by 6 wickets
Chilaw Marians Cricket Club Ground, Katunayake
Umpires: Gamini Dissanayake and Ranmore Martinesz

- Ragama Cricket Club won the toss and elected to field.

3rd Quarterfinal
7 April 2021
Scorecard

Nondescripts Cricket Club; 337/9 (50 overs)	v	Sri Lanka Navy Sports Club; 170 (46 overs)
Kamil Mishara 107 (114); Poorna Charuka 4/47 (6 overs)		Johanne de Zilva 44 (72); Chamika Karunaratne 2/23 (7 overs)

Nondescripts Cricket Club won by 167 runs
Colts Cricket Club Ground, Colombo
Umpires: Asanga Jayasooriya and Pradeep Udawatta

- Nondescripts Cricket Club won the toss and elected to bat.
- Dineth Jayakody (Nondescripts Cricket Club) made his List A debut.

4th Quarterfinal
7 April 2021
Scorecard

Sri Lanka Army Sports Club; 198 (48.2 overs)	v	Sinhalese Sports Club; 181 (47.1 overs)
Dushan Vimukthi 55* (107); Prabath Jayasuriya 3/32 (10 overs)		Himesh Ramanayake 54 (59); Suminda Lakshan 3/30 (10 overs)

Sri Lanka Army Sports Club won by 17 runs
P Sara Oval, Colombo
Umpires: Deepal Gunawardene and Rohitha Kottahachchi

- Sri Lanka Army Sports Club won the toss and elected to bat.

=== Finals ===
1st Semi-final
9 April 2021
Scorecard

Nondescripts Cricket Club; 292/7 (50 overs)	v	Badureliya Sports Club; 274/9 (49.3 overs)
Upul Tharanga 136 (139); Alankara Asanka Silva 3/60 (10 overs)		Tillakaratne Sampath 98 (97); Lahiru Kumara 4/42 (9.3 overs)

Nondescripts Cricket Club won by 18 runs
Colombo Cricket Club Ground, Colombo
Umpires: Keerthi Bandara and Lyndon Hannibal

- Badureliya Sports Club won the toss and elected to field.
- Nimesh de Silva (Nondescripts Cricket Club) made his List A debut.

2nd Semi-final
9 April 2021
Scorecard

Sri Lanka Army Sports Club; 178 (46.3 overs)	v	Ragama Cricket Club; 179/2 (39.2 overs)
Thisara Perera 45 (32); Ishan Jayaratne 5/31 (8.3 overs)		Saminda Fernando 99 (145); Seekkuge Prasanna 1/32 (7.2 overs)

Ragama Cricket Club won by 8 wickets
Nondescripts Cricket Club Ground, Colombo
Umpires: Prageeth Rambukwella and Raveendra Wimalasiri

- Sri Lanka Army Sports Club won the toss and elected to bat.
- Shehan Sandaruwan (Ragama Cricket Club) made his List A debut.

Final
11 April 2021
Scorecard

Nondescripts Cricket Club; 286/7 (50 overs)	v	Ragama Cricket Club; 141 (30.3 overs)
Kamil Mishara 113 (132); Ishan Jayaratne 3/52 (10 overs)		Janith Liyanage 42 (71); Chamika Karunaratne 4/37 (6 overs)

Nondescripts Cricket Club won by 145 runs
Sinhalese Sports Club Ground, Colombo
Umpires: Kumar Dharmasena and Raveendra Wimalasiri

- Nondescripts Cricket Club won the toss and elected to bat.
