= Warnapura =

Warnapura is a surname. Notable people with the surname include:

- Bandula Warnapura (1953–2021), Sri Lankan cricketer
- Madawa Warnapura (born 1988), Sri Lankan cricketer
- Malinda Warnapura (born 1979), Sri Lankan cricketer
- Wasantha Warnapura (born 1981), Sri Lankan cricketer
