= Kavindu =

Kavindu is a given name and surname. Notable people with the name include:

== Given name ==
- Kavindu Bandara (born 1997), Sri Lankan cricketer
- Kavindu Ediriweera (born 1999), Sri Lankan cricketer
- Kavindu Ishan (born 1992), Sri Lankan footballer
- Kavindu Kularathne (born 1997), Sri Lankan cricketer
- Kavindu Kulasekara (born 1995), Sri Lankan cricketer
- Kavindu Madushan (born 1997), Sri Lankan model
- Kavindu Nadeeshan (born 2001), Sri Lankan cricketer
- Kavindu Ranasinghe (born 2001), Sri Lankan cricketer
- Kavindu Ridmal (born 2000), Sri Lankan cricketer
- Kavindu Silva (born 1993), Sri Lankan cricketer

== Surname ==
- Agnes Kavindu (fl. 2018), Kenyan politician
