= Danal =

Danal may refer to:

- Danal language, language in Chad
- Danal Hemananda (born 2003), Sri Lankan cricketer
