= Dishan (given name) =

Dishan is an Asian given name. Notable people with the given name include:

- Xu Dishan (许地山; 1893–1941), Chinese author, translator and folklorist
- Yugeesha Dishan (born 1999), Sri Lankan cricketer

== See also ==
- Dishan, a minor figure of the Hebrew Bible
- Dishan Kala, a citadel in Khiva, Uzbekistan
