= Rashmika =

Rashmika is a unisex given name found in Sri Lanka and India. Notable people with this name include:

- Rashmika Dilshan (born 1998), Sri Lankan cricketer
- Rashmika Mandanna (born 1996), Indian actress
- Rashmika Mevan (born 2001), Sri Lankan cricketer
- Rashmika Opatha (born 1997), Sri Lankan cricketer
