= Wijesiri =

Wijesiri is a surname. Notable people with the surname include:

- Chaminda Wijesiri (born 1980), Sri Lankan politician
- Kalana Wijesiri (born 2000), Sri Lankan cricketer
- Sahan Wijesiri (born 1988), Sri Lankan cricketer
- Ravishka Wijesiri (born 2000), Sri Lankan cricketer
