= Nimantha =

Nimantha is both a given name and a surname. Notable people with the name include:

- Nimantha Gunasiri (born 1996), Sri Lankan cricketer
- Nimantha Peiris (born 1994), Sri Lankan cricketer
- Nimantha Perera (born 1981), Sri Lankan cricketer
- Ramesh Nimantha (born 1997), Sri Lankan cricketer
