= Nalliah =

Nalliah is both a given name and a surname. Notable people with the name include:

- Nalliah Devarajan (born 1965), Sri Lankan cricketer
- Danny Nalliah (born 1964), Sri Lankan Australian evangelical Christian pastor
- V. Nalliah, Ceylon Tamil teacher
