= Paranathala =

Paranathala is a surname. Notable people with the surname include:

- Jayantha Paranathala (1950–2023), Sri Lankan cricketer
- Suchira Paranathala (born 1995), Sri Lankan cricketer
