= Dulaj =

Dulaj is both a given name and a surname. Notable people with the name include:

- Dulaj Dananjaya (born 1992), Sri Lankan cricketer
- Dulaj Ranatunga (born 1999), Sri Lankan cricketer
- Shanuka Dulaj (born 1995), Sri Lankan cricketer
