= Mevan =

Mevan is a name found in Sri Lanka. It can be both a masculine given name and a surname. Notable people with this name include:

== As a given name ==
- Mevan Fernando (born 1981), a Sri Lankan cricketer
- Mevan Pieris (born 1946), a Sri Lankan former cricketer

== As a surname ==
- Rashmika Mevan (born 2001), a Sri Lankan cricketer
