= Hemananda =

Hemananda is both a given name and a surname. Notable people with the name include:

- Hemananda Biswal (1939–2022), Indian politician
- Danal Hemananda (born 2003), Sri Lankan cricketer
