= Polgampola =

Polgampola is a surname. Notable people with the surname include:

- Chamari Polgampola (born 1981), Sri Lankan cricketer
- Dilhara Polgampola (born 1999), Sri Lankan cricketer
