= Dilupa Perera =

Sri Lankan cricketer (born 1990)

Dilupa Perera (born Maladiarachchige Kasun Dilupa Perera on 3 December 1990) is a Sri Lankan cricketer. He is a right-handed batsman and leg-break bowler who plays for Moors Sports Club. He was born in Colombo.

He made his debut first-class appearance for the side during the 2008-09 Premier Championship, against Ragama Cricket Club. In the only innings in which he batted, he scored 6 not out.

He bowled 12 overs, conceding 69 runs. As of the 2009 season, he plays for Moors Sports Club Under-23s in the Under-23 Tournament.
