= Yash Arora =

Indian cricketer (born 1993)

Personal information
- Born: 17 July 1993 (age 33); Kanpur, India
- Source: Cricinfo, 3 April 2021

Yash Arora (born 17 July 1993) is an Indian cricketer. He made his List A debut on 1 April 2021, for Galle Cricket Club in the 2020–21 Major Clubs Limited Over Tournament in Sri Lanka.
