= Rohan Sanjaya =

Sri Lankan cricketer (born 2001)

Personal information
- Born: 13 June 2001 (age 25)
- Source: ESPNcricinfo, 16 December 2018

Rohan Sanjaya (born 13 June 2001) is a Sri Lankan cricketer. He made his first-class debut for Colts Cricket Club in the 2018–19 Premier League Tournament on 14 December 2018. He made his List A debut on 17 December 2019, for Colts Cricket Club in the 2019–20 Invitation Limited Over Tournament. He made his Twenty20 debut on 4 March 2021, for Colts Cricket Club in the 2020–21 SLC Twenty20 Tournament.
