= Chamindu Wijesinghe =

Sri Lankan cricketer (born 2000)

Personal information
- Full name: Mohotti Arachchige Chamindu Piyamal Wijesinghe
- Born: 3 September 2000 (age 26); Colombo, Sri Lanka
- Batting: Right-handed
- Bowling: Right-arm medium
- Role: All-rounder

Domestic team information
- Years: Team
- Kandy Falcons
- Source: Cricinfo, 4 March 2021

Chamindu Wijesinghe (born 3 September 2000) is a Sri Lankan cricketer. He made his Twenty20 debut on 4 March 2021, for Colombo Cricket Club in the 2020–21 SLC Twenty20 Tournament. Prior to his Twenty20 debut, he was named in Sri Lanka's squad for the 2020 Under-19 Cricket World Cup. He made his List A debut on 24 March 2021, for Colombo Cricket Club in the 2020–21 Major Clubs Limited Over Tournament.
