= Pansilu Deshan =

Sri Lankan cricketer (born 1998)

Personal information
- Born: 18 November 1998 (age 27)
- Source: Cricinfo, 7 March 2021

Pansilu Deshan (born 18 November 1998) is a Sri Lankan cricketer. He made his Twenty20 debut on 7 March 2021, for Kalutara Town Club in the 2020–21 SLC Twenty20 Tournament.
