= Usman Ishak =

Sri Lankan cricketer (born 1994)

Personal information
- Born: 3 July 1994 (age 32); Colombo, Sri Lanka
- Source: ESPNcricinfo, 30 January 2017

Usman Ishak (born 3 July 1994) is a Sri Lankan cricketer. He made his first-class debut for Colombo Cricket Club in the 2016–17 Premier League Tournament on 28 January 2017. He made his List A debut on 24 March 2021, for Colombo Cricket Club in the 2020–21 Major Clubs Limited Over Tournament.
