= Kanagarathinam Kabilraj =

Sri Lankan cricketer (born 1999)

Personal information
- Born: 12 July 1999 (age 27); Jaffna, Sri Lanka
- Batting: Right-handed
- Bowling: Right-arm medium-fast
- Source: Cricinfo, 12 March 2021

Kanagarathinam Kabilraj (born 12 July 1999) is a Sri Lankan cricketer. He made his Twenty20 debut on 12 March 2021, for Police Sports Club in the 2020–21 SLC Twenty20 Tournament. Prior to his Twenty20 debut, he was drafted by the Jaffna Stallions for the 2020 Lanka Premier League. He made his List A debut on 24 March 2021, for Police Sports Club in the 2020–21 Major Clubs Limited Over Tournament. In November 2021, he was selected to play for the Colombo Stars following the players' draft for the 2021 Lanka Premier League.
