= Dineth Jayakody =

Sri Lankan cricketer (born 2002)

Personal information
- Born: 2 February 2002 (age 24)
- Source: Cricinfo, 4 March 2021

Dineth Jayakody (born 2 February 2002) is a Sri Lankan cricketer. He made his Twenty20 debut on 4 March 2021, for Nondescripts Cricket Club in the 2020–21 SLC Twenty20 Tournament. He made his List A debut on 7 April 2021, for Nondescripts Cricket Club in the 2020–21 Major Clubs Limited Over Tournament.
