= Dellon Peiris =

Sri Lankan cricketer (born 2000)

Personal information
- Born: 16 March 2000 (age 26)
- Source: Cricinfo, 30 March 2021

Dellon Peiris (born 16 March 2000) is a Sri Lankan cricketer. He made his Twenty20 debut on 9 March 2021, for Ragama Cricket Club in the 2020–21 SLC Twenty20 Tournament. He made his List A debut on 30 March 2021, for Ragama Cricket Club in the 2020–21 Major Clubs Limited Over Tournament.
