= Malinda Abhishek =

Sri Lankan cricketer (born 1998)

Personal information
- Born: 17 October 1998 (age 28); Colombo, Sri Lanka
- Source: Cricinfo, 3 April 2021

Malinda Abhishek (born 17 October 1998) is a Sri Lankan cricketer. He made his Twenty20 debut for Police Sports Club in the 2018–19 SLC Twenty20 Tournament on 16 February 2019. He made his List A debut on 1 April 2021, for Burgher Recreation Club in the 2020–21 Major Clubs Limited Over Tournament.
