= Sandun Mendis =

Sri Lankan cricketer (born 2001)

Personal information
- Born: 13 March 2001 (age 25)
- Source: Cricinfo, 22 December 2019

Sandun Mendis (born 13 March 2001) is a Sri Lankan cricketer. He made his List A debut on 22 December 2019, for Colombo Cricket Club in the 2019–20 Invitation Limited Over Tournament. He made his Twenty20 debut on 4 March 2021, for Chilaw Marians Cricket Club in the 2020–21 SLC Twenty20 Tournament.
