= Ravindu Fernando =

Sri Lankan cricketer (born 1999)

Personal information
- Full name: Ravindu Suharshana Fernando
- Born: 3 November 1999 (age 27); Ragama, Sri Lanka
- Batting: Right-handed
- Bowling: Right arm off break
- Role: Batting all-rounder

International information
- National side: Sri Lanka
- Only T20I (cap 103): 4 October 2023 v Afghanistan
- Source: Cricinfo, 15 July 2020

Ravindu Fernando (born 3 November 1999) is a Sri Lankan cricketer. He made his first-class debut for Bloomfield Cricket and Athletic Club in Tier B of the 2019–20 Premier League Tournament on 22 February 2020. He made his Twenty20 debut on 4 March 2021, for Tamil Union Cricket and Athletic Club in the 2020–21 SLC Twenty20 Tournament. He made his List A debut on 30 March 2021, for Tamil Union Cricket and Athletic Club in the 2020–21 Major Clubs Limited Over Tournament.

In July 2022, he was signed by the Dambulla Giants for the third edition of the Lanka Premier League.
