= Mohamed Shilmi =

Sri Lankan cricketer (born 1994)

Personal information
- Full name: Mohamed Shilmi
- Born: 14 January 1994 (age 32)
- Source: Cricinfo, 9 April 2017

Mohamed Shilmi (born 14 January 1994) is a Sri Lankan cricketer. He made his List A debut for Kalutara District in the 2016–17 Districts One Day Tournament on 22 March 2017. He made his Twenty20 debut on 4 March 2021, for Kalutara Town Club in the 2020–21 SLC Twenty20 Tournament.
