= Priyantha Rathnayake =

Sri Lankan cricketer (born 1989)

Personal information
- Born: 28 July 1989 (age 37)
- Source: Cricinfo, 28 March 2021

Priyantha Rathnayake (born 28 July 1989) is a Sri Lankan cricketer. He made his Twenty20 debut on 14 March 2021, for Sri Lanka Army Sports Club in the 2020–21 SLC Twenty20 Tournament. He made his List A debut on 28 March 2021, for Sri Lanka Army Sports Club in the 2020–21 Major Clubs Limited Over Tournament.
