= Sanka Purna =

Sri Lankan cricketer (born 1998)

Personal information
- Born: 3 March 1998 (age 28)
- Source: Cricinfo, 3 April 2021

Sanka Purna (born 3 March 1998) is a Sri Lankan cricketer. He made his List A debut on 3 April 2021, for Ace Capital Cricket Club in the 2020–21 Major Clubs Limited Over Tournament.
