= Jacob Sachin =

Sri Lankan cricketer (born 1995)

Personal information
- Born: 14 July 1995 (age 31)
- Source: Cricinfo, 3 January 2020

Jacob Sachin (born 14 July 1995) is a Sri Lankan cricketer. He made his List A debut on 19 December 2019, for Galle Cricket Club in the 2019–20 Invitation Limited Over Tournament. He made his first-class debut on 31 January 2020, for Galle Cricket Club in Tier B of the 2019–20 Premier League Tournament. He made his Twenty20 debut on 7 March 2021, for Galle Cricket Club in the 2020–21 SLC Twenty20 Tournament.
