= Harshajith Rushan =

Sri Lankan cricketer (born 1998)

Personal information
- Born: 23 February 1998 (age 28)
- Source: Cricinfo, 26 March 2021

Harshajith Rushan (born 23 February 1998) is a Sri Lankan cricketer. He made his List A debut on 26 March 2021, for Galle Cricket Club in the 2020–21 Major Clubs Limited Over Tournament. He made his Twenty20 debut on 22 May 2022, for Galle Cricket Club in the Major Clubs T20 Tournament.
