= Muditha Lakshan =

Sri Lankan cricketer (born 2000)

Personal information
- Born: 20 December 2000 (age 25)
- Batting: Right-handed
- Bowling: Slow left-arm
- Source: Cricinfo, 9 August 2021

Muditha Lakshan (born 20 December 2000) is a Sri Lankan cricketer. He has captained the D. S. Senanayake College team, and scored more than 1,000 runs for the team in two successive seasons.

He made his Twenty20 debut on 4 March 2021, for Nugegoda Sports and Welfare Club in the 2020–21 SLC Twenty20 Tournament. He made his List A debut on 24 March 2021, for Nugegoda Sports and Welfare Club in the 2020–21 Major Clubs Limited Over Tournament. In August 2021, he was named in the SLC Reds team for the 2021 SLC Invitational T20 League tournament. In November 2021, he was selected to play for the Dambulla Giants following the players' draft for the 2021 Lanka Premier League. In July 2022, he was signed by the Colombo Stars for the third edition of the Lanka Premier League.
