= Kalhara Senarathne =

Sri Lankan cricketer (born 2000)

Personal information
- Full name: Senarathne Mudiyanselage Kalhara Shaminda Senarathne
- Born: 24 August 2000 (age 26); Colombo, Sri Lanka
- Batting: Left-handed
- Bowling: Right-arm off-break
- Source: ESPNcricinfo, 16 December 2018

Kalhara Senarathne (born 24 August 2000) is a Sri Lankan cricketer. He made his first-class debut for Ragama Cricket Club in the 2018–19 Premier League Tournament on 14 December 2018. He made his Twenty20 debut on 9 March 2021, for Ragama Cricket Club in the 2020–21 SLC Twenty20 Tournament. He made his List A debut on 24 March 2021, for Ragama Cricket Club in the 2020–21 Major Clubs Limited Over Tournament. In November 2021, he was selected to play for the Kandy Warriors following the players' draft for the 2021 Lanka Premier League.
