= Ruvin Peiris =

Sri Lankan cricketer (born 2000)

Personal information
- Born: 22 September 2000 (age 26)
- Source: Cricinfo, 4 March 2021

Ruvin Peiris (born 22 September 2000) is a Sri Lankan cricketer. He made his Twenty20 debut on 4 March 2021, for Kurunegala Youth Cricket Club in the 2020–21 SLC Twenty20 Tournament.
