= Deshan Fernando =

Sri Lankan cricketer (born 1998)

Personal information
- Full name: Hettiadurage Sangeeth Deshan Fernando
- Born: 24 April 1998 (age 28)
- Source: Cricinfo, 3 January 2020

Hettiadurage Sangeeth Deshan Fernando (born 24 April 1998) is a Sri Lankan cricketer. He made his List A debut on 23 December 2019, for Kandy Customs Cricket Club in the 2019–20 Invitation Limited Over Tournament. He made his Twenty20 debut on 4 March 2021, for Bloomfield Cricket and Athletic Club in the 2020–21 SLC Twenty20 Tournament.
