= Janith =

Janith is both a given name and a surname.

Notable people with the given name include:

- Janith Liyanage (born 1995), Sri Lankan cricketer
- Janith Silva (born 1990), Sri Lankan cricketer
- Janith Koralla (born 2011), Child prodigy, Chess player

Janith Pathirage (born 1990), Sri Lankan book reviewer

Notable people with the surname include:

- Buddika Janith (born 1989) is a Sri Lankan cricketer
