= Muditha Premadasa =

Sri Lankan cricketer (born 2001)

Personal information
- Born: 23 July 2001 (age 25)
- Source: Cricinfo, 4 March 2021

Muditha Premadasa (born 23 July 2001) is a Sri Lankan cricketer. He made his Twenty20 debut on 4 March 2021, for Kurunegala Youth Cricket Club in the 2020–21 SLC Twenty20 Tournament. He made his List A debut on 24 March 2021, for Kurunegala Youth Cricket Club in the 2020–21 Major Clubs Limited Over Tournament.
