= Romesh Nallaperuma =

Sri Lankan cricketer (born 1998)

Personal information
- Born: 2 March 1998 (age 28)
- Source: Cricinfo, 26 March 2021

Romesh Nallaperuma (born 2 March 1998) is a Sri Lankan cricketer. He made his List A debut on 26 March 2021, for Sebastianites Cricket and Athletic Club in the 2020–21 Major Clubs Limited Over Tournament.
