= Hashan Chamara =

Sri Lankan cricketer (born 1995)

Personal information
- Full name: Karunamani Hashan Chamara Silva
- Born: 28 September 1995 (age 31)
- Source: Cricinfo, 14 July 2020

Karunamani Hashan Chamara Silva (born 28 September 1995) is a Sri Lankan cricketer. He made his first-class debut for Kalutara Town Club in Tier B of the 2019–20 Premier League Tournament on 5 February 2020. He made his Twenty20 debut on 7 March 2021, for Panadura Sports Club in the 2020–21 SLC Twenty20 Tournament. He made his List A debut on 24 March 2021, for Panadura Sports Club in the 2020–21 Major Clubs Limited Over Tournament.
