= Dulaj Dananjaya =

Sri Lankan cricketer (born 1992)

Personal information
- Born: 18 November 1992 (age 33)
- Source: Cricinfo, 14 March 2021

Dulaj Dananjaya (born 18 November 1992) is a Sri Lankan cricketer. He made his Twenty20 debut on 14 March 2021, for Panadura Sports Club in the 2020–21 SLC Twenty20 Tournament.
