= Suchira Paranathala =

Sri Lankan cricketer (born 1995)

Personal information
- Born: 13 April 1995 (age 31)
- Source: Cricinfo, 26 March 2021

Suchira Paranathala (born 13 April 1995) is a Sri Lankan cricketer. He made his List A debut on 26 March 2021, for Sebastianites Cricket and Athletic Club in the 2020–21 Major Clubs Limited Over Tournament.
