= Sanjaya Ranaweera (cricketer, born 1986) =

Sri Lankan cricketer (born 1986)

Personal information
- Full name: Vidana Gamage Ravindra Sanjaya Ranaweera
- Born: 7 April 1986 (age 40); Colombo
- Batting: Left-handed
- Bowling: Left-arm medium
- Source: Cricinfo, 15 July 2020

Sanjaya Ranaweera (born 7 April 1986) is a Sri Lankan cricketer. He made his first-class debut for Sri Lanka Air Force Sports Club in Tier B of the 2019–20 Premier League Tournament on 13 March 2020. He made his Twenty20 debut for Sri Lanka Air Force Sports Club in the 2017–18 SLC Twenty20 Tournament on 24 February 2018. He made his List A debut on 24 March 2021, for Sri Lanka Air Force Sports Club in the 2020–21 Major Clubs Limited Over Tournament.
