= Lasanda Rukmal =

Sri Lankan cricketer (born 1990)

Personal information
- Born: 5 September 1990 (age 36); Beruwala, Sri Lanka
- Source: Cricinfo, 28 January 2016

Lasanda Rukmal (born 5 September 1990) is a Sri Lankan first-class cricketer who plays for Sri Lanka Air Force Sports Club.
