= Dilshan Kanchana =

Sri Lankan cricketer (born 1995)

Personal information
- Born: 4 August 1995 (age 31)
- Source: Cricinfo, 25 February 2018

Dilshan Kanchana (born 4 August 1995) is a Sri Lankan cricketer. He made his Twenty20 debut for Galle Cricket Club in the 2017–18 SLC Twenty20 Tournament on 25 February 2018. He made his List A debut for Galle Cricket Club in the 2017–18 Premier Limited Overs Tournament on 18 March 2018.
