= England Lions cricket team in Sri Lanka in 2016–17 =

England Lions cricket team in Sri Lanka in 2016-17
	Sri Lanka 'A'	England Lions
- Dates: 17 February – 11 March 2017
Captains	Dhananjaya de Silva (FC); Milinda Siriwardana (LA)	Keaton Jennings

FC series
- Result: 2-match series drawn 1–1
Most runs	Dimuth Karunaratne (223)	Liam Livingstone (320)
Most wickets	Malinda Pushpakumara (21)	Ollie Rayner (10)
- Player of the series: Malinda Pushpakumara (Sri Lanka A)

LA series
- Result: Sri Lanka 'A' won the 5-match series 3–2

The England Lions cricket team toured Sri Lanka in February–March 2017 to play two first-class and five limited overs matches.
