= Kavindu Ridmal =

Sri Lankan cricketer (born 2000)

Personal information
- Full name: Kavindu Ridmal Wijetunga Arachchi
- Born: 10 May 2000 (age 26)
- Source: Cricinfo, 24 March 2021

Kavindu Ridmal Wijetunga Arachchi (born 10 May 2000) is a Sri Lankan cricketer. He made his Twenty20 debut on 4 January 2020, for Sri Lanka Ports Authority Cricket Club in the 2019–20 SLC Twenty20 Tournament. He made his List A debut on 24 March 2021, for Ace Capital Cricket Club in the 2020–21 Major Clubs Limited Over Tournament.
