= Thaveesha Kahaduwaarachchi =

Sri Lankan cricketer (born 2000)

Personal information
- Born: 28 October 2000 (age 26)
- Source: Cricinfo, 19 December 2019

Thaveesha Kahaduwaarachchi (born 28 October 2000) is a Sri Lankan cricketer. He made his List A debut on 19 December 2019, for Saracens Sports Club in the 2019–20 Invitation Limited Over Tournament. In January 2020, he was named in Sri Lanka's squad for the 2020 Under-19 Cricket World Cup. He made his Twenty20 debut on 6 March 2021, for Saracens Sports Club in the 2020–21 SLC Twenty20 Tournament.
