= Umeshka Morais =

Sri Lankan cricketer (born 1995)

Personal information
- Born: 18 August 1995 (age 31); Colombo, Sri Lanka
- Source: ESPNcricinfo, 2 December 2016

Umeshka Morais (born 18 August 1995) is a Sri Lankan cricketer. He made his first-class debut for Moors Sports Club in the 2016–17 Premier League Tournament on 29 November 2016. He made his List A debut for Sri Lanka Police Sports Club in the 2017–18 Premier Limited Overs Tournament on 18 March 2018. He made his Twenty20 debut for Panadura Sports Club in the 2018–19 SLC Twenty20 Tournament on 18 February 2019.
