= Malinda Warnapura =

Sri Lankan cricketer (born 1979)

Personal information
- Full name: Basnayake Shalith Malinda Warnapura
- Born: 26 May 1979 (age 47); Colombo, Sri Lanka
- Nickname: Mali
- Height: 5 ft 6 in (1.68 m)
- Batting: Left-handed
- Bowling: Right-arm offbreak
- Role: Batsman
- Relatives: Bandula Warnapura (uncle); Madawa Warnapura (cousin)

International information
- National side: Sri Lanka (2007–2009)
- Test debut (cap 106): 25 June 2007 v Bangladesh
- Last Test: 20 July 2009 v Pakistan
- ODI debut (cap 132): 20 May 2007 v Pakistan
- Last ODI: 29 August 2008 v India

Domestic team information
- Years: Team
- Basnahira South
- Burgher Recreation Club
- Colombo Cricket Club
- Colts Cricket Club
- Khelaghar SKS
- Sri Lanka A

Career statistics
Competition	Test	ODI	FC	LA
Matches	14	3	149	111
Runs scored	821	35	7,183	2,316
Batting average	35.69	11.66	35.55	28.59
100s/50s	2/7	0/0	16/36	3/8
Top score	120	30	242	104*
Balls bowled	54	–	6,918	2,234
Wickets	0	–	118	69
Bowling average	–	–	27.72	23.15
5 wickets in innings	–	–	4	1
10 wickets in match	–	–	0	0
Best bowling	–	–	6/22	5/33
Catches/stumpings	14/–	3/–	100/–	43/–
- Source: Cricinfo, 4 August 2015

Basnayake Shalith Malinda Warnapura (born 26 May 1979), or Malinda Warnapura, is a former professional Sri Lankan cricketer, who played in 14 Test matches and three One Day Internationals. He is a left-handed batsman and right-arm off-break bowler. He is the current coach of Johnsonville Cricket Club in the Wellington Premiership. He is the nephew of former Sri Lankan cricket captain Bandula Warnapura and the cousin of cricketer Madawa Warnapura.

== Domestic career ==
Making his first class debut in 1998/99, Warnapura did not play international cricket for Sri Lanka until 2007. He had however previously represented them in the cricket tournament at the 1998 Commonwealth Games. He made his highest first class score of 242 playing for Sri Lanka A against Bangladesh A in 2007.

== International career ==
Malinda made his ODI debut on 20 May 2007 against Bangladesh, and Test debut at the same series, on 25 June 2007. Malinda scored his first Test century in his third Test, where he scored 120 runs in the first innings against West Indies. Despite his aggressive shots as an opening batsman with Michael Vandort, and in late with Tharanga Paranavitana, he was dropped from the team after Pakistan series in 2009. Then he was never called to the team in both Tests and ODIs. Until his doors were closed to the international arena, Malinda played 14 Tests with 2 centuries and 3 ODIs. He is now acting as a television commentator for sports as well as playing domestic cricket.
