= Nimantha Peiris =

Sri Lankan cricketer (born 1994)

Personal information
- Born: 18 April 1994 (age 32)
- Source: Cricinfo, 24 March 2021

Nimantha Peiris (born 18 April 1994) is a Sri Lankan cricketer. He made his List A debut on 24 March 2021, for Panadura Sports Club in the 2020–21 Major Clubs Limited Over Tournament.
