= Nalliah Devarajan =

Sri Lankan cricketer (born 1965)

Personal information
- Born: 24 August 1965 (age 61)
- Source: Cricinfo, 28 March 2021

Nalliah Devarajan (born 24 August 1965) is a Sri Lankan former cricketer who played in 45 first-class and 11 List A matches between 1988/89 and 2000/01. He is now an umpire, and stood in matches in the 2020–21 Major Clubs Limited Over Tournament.
