= Yugeesha Dishan =

Sri Lankan cricketer (born 1999)

Personal information
- Full name: Yugeesha Dishan Wijethunga
- Born: 11 November 1999 (age 27); Colombo, Sri Lanka

Domestic team information
- Years: Team
- 2020/21–present: Nondescripts Cricket Club
- Source: Cricinfo, 13 November 2021

Yugeesha Dishan (born 11 November 1999) is a Sri Lankan cricketer. He made his List A debut on 30 March 2021, for Nondescripts Cricket Club in the 2020–21 Major Clubs Limited Over Tournament. He made his Twenty20 debut on 23 May 2022, for Nondescripts Cricket Club in the Major Clubs T20 Tournament.
