= Dilhara Polgampola =

Sri Lankan cricketer (born 1999)

Personal information
- Born: 11 October 1999 (age 27)
- Source: Cricinfo, 6 January 2020

Dilhara Polgampola (born 11 October 1999) is a Sri Lankan cricketer. He made his Twenty20 debut on 6 January 2020, for Sri Lanka Ports Authority Cricket Club in the 2019–20 SLC Twenty20 Tournament. He made his List A debut on 3 April 2021, for Ace Capital Cricket Club in the 2020–21 Major Clubs Limited Over Tournament.
