= Kavindu Ranasinghe =

Sri Lankan cricketer (born 2001)

Personal information
- Born: 19 February 2001 (age 25)
- Source: Cricinfo, 14 March 2021

Kavindu Ranasinghe (born 19 February 2001) is a Sri Lankan cricketer. He made his Twenty20 debut on 14 March 2021, for Colombo Cricket Club in the 2020–21 SLC Twenty20 Tournament.
