= Bandula Warnapura =

Sri Lankan cricketer (1953–2021)

Personal information
- Full name: Bandula Warnapura
- Born: 1 March 1953; Rambukkana, Ceylon
- Died: 18 October 2021 (aged 68); Colombo, Sri Lanka
- Batting: Right-handed
- Bowling: Right-arm medium
- Role: All-rounder
- Relatives: Madura Warnapura (elder son); Madawa Warnapura (younger son); Malinda Warnapura (nephew)

International information
- National side: Sri Lanka (1975–1982)
- Test debut (cap 10): 17 February 1982 v England
- Last Test: 17 September 1982 v India
- ODI debut (cap 11): 7 June 1975 v West Indies
- Last ODI: 26 September 1982 v India

Domestic team information
- Years: Team
- 1990–1991: Bloomfield

Career statistics
Competition	Test	ODI	FC	LA
Matches	4	12	57	33
Runs scored	96	180	2,280	579
Batting average	12.00	15.00	25.05	19.30
100s/50s	0/0	0/1	2/10	1/3
Top score	38	77	154	106
Balls bowled	90	414	1,211	1,018
Wickets	0	8	13	21
Bowling average	–	39.50	48.30	37.42
5 wickets in innings	–	0	0	0
10 wickets in match	–	0	0	0
Best bowling	–	3/42	2/33	3/21
Catches/stumpings	2/–	5/–	23/–	13/–
- Source: Cricinfo, 31 January 2009

Bandula Warnapura (Sinhala: බන්දුල වර්ණපුර; 1 March 1953 – 18 October 2021) was a Sri Lankan cricketer and former captain of the Sri Lankan cricket team. He played four Test matches and twelve One Day Internationals (ODI) during his international cricketing career from 1975 to 1982. He was a right-handed opening batsman and a right-handed medium pace bowler.

Warnapura captained Sri Lanka's first Test match, and also faced the first delivery and scored the first run for his team. He also had the rare distinction of opening the bowling and opening the batting in the second innings for Sri Lanka in their first ever Test match.

He captained Sri Lanka in all the Tests he played, although he could not lead his team to victory in any of them. However, Sri Lanka won the first ODI match he captained. He scored one half-century in ODI cricket.

== Personal life ==
Bandula Warnapura was born on 1 March 1953 in Rambukkana. Malinda Warnapura, who played for the Sri Lanka national cricket team, is his nephew. He was an old boy of Nalanda College Colombo. Bandula captained Nalanda College Colombo first XI cricket team in 1971. Warnapura has worked as an ICC match referee and an umpire, and was also a certified cricketing coach. He served as the coach for the Sri Lanka national cricket team before he was appointed Director of Coaching in 1994. He became Director of Operations of Sri Lanka Cricket in 2001. He functioned in that post for eight years before he resigned in 2008. He was the Development Manager of the Asian Cricket Council. He has also refereed two Tests and three ODIs in 2001

== Domestic career ==
He made his first-class debut against the Indian Universities in 1970. He rose to prominence at first-class level for his blistering knock of 154 against Pakistan Under-25s during the 1973–74 season.

== International career ==
=== Test career ===
Warnapura was the first Sri Lankan Test cricket cap and got the opportunity to lead the Sri Lanka national cricket team in their first Test match, which was played against England in 1982. The five-day match started on 17 February 1982 at the Paikiasothy Saravanamuttu Stadium. Warnapura and English captain Keith Fletcher made the toss in the morning, which was won by Warnapura. He elected to bat first, and opened the batting for Sri Lanka with Sidath Wettimuny. He faced the first delivery of the match, and scored the first Test run for his country. According to a local newspaper, he was even the first Sri Lankan batsman to get hit on the chest. However, he was dismissed for only 2 runs, when he was caught by David Gower off the bowling of Bob Willis. The first player to bat in a Test match for Sri Lanka had faced 25 deliveries during the 35 minutes he batted. During the Sri Lankan second innings, Warnapura made 38 runs off 155 deliveries – the second highest score in that innings. England won the match, and Warnapura's 38 would remain as his highest Test individual score.

Warnapura was unsuccessful in his second match, played against Pakistan in March 1982, scoring just 13 runs in the Sri Lankan first innings, and getting out without scoring in the second. He could not play in the second match of the series due to an injury. In the next match, also against Pakistan, he scored 7 and 26 in the first and second innings respectively. Both matches were lost by Sri Lanka.

Warnapura's fourth and last Test match was against India in September 1982. He was unsuccessful again, scoring just 4 in the first innings and 6 in the second, and the match ended in a draw. During his Test career, Warnapura captained the Sri Lankan side in all four matches he played. He had scored a total of 96 runs, with an average of 12.00.

=== ODI career ===
Warnapura was the 11th Sri Lankan ODI cricket cap. His One Day International (ODI) debut was against West Indies on 7 June 1975, in a 1975 Cricket World Cup match that was also Sri Lanka's first ODI. He was dismissed for 8 runs in that match, which Sri Lanka lost. Bandula had a weird ODI debut scoring 8 runs off 54 balls and he became the first Sri Lankan batsman ever to score a boundary in an ODI as well as the first boundary scored by a batsman for Sri Lanka in a World Cup match.

He was given the captaincy of the team to temporarily replace Anura Tennekoon (who was injured) in his fifth match, which was played against India on 16 June 1979, as part of the 1979 Cricket World Cup. He led the team to victory, scoring 18 runs in the match and taking a wicket. It was also the only victory in the series by an Associate Member nation (Sri Lanka had not yet gained Full Member status) in the tournament.

In 1982, Warnapura was appointed captain of the Sri Lankan team. He made his first and only half-century against Pakistan on 12 March in the same year. He made 77 runs in that match, although it was lost by Sri Lanka. Warnapura played 12 ODI matches, accumulating a total of 180 runs at an average of 15.00. He also captured 8 wickets at an average of 39.50, as well taking 5 catches during his career.

=== Arosa Sri Lanka ===
Disputes had arisen among members of the Sri Lankan team and its administration only a few months after Sri Lanka's inaugural Test match. This resulted in a "rebel tour" of apartheid South Africa (which was banned from international cricket at the time). Several Sri Lankan players took part in this tour, and the team which was captained by Warnapura and named Arosa Sri Lanka, left the country in secret in September 1982. The tour was unsuccessful; Arosa Sri Lanka played 12 matches and lost 10 of them, while the other two ended in draws. As a result of this tour, the Board of Control for Cricket in Sri Lanka (BCCSL) imposed 25-year bans from all forms of cricket on all Sri Lankan players who participated, including Warnapura. Although the ban was revoked after nine years, Warnapura did not play international cricket again. He later claimed that not only financial issues but pressure from some members of the BCCSL forced them to undertake the tour, and expressed disappointment at the fact that no formal inquiry was held.

== Later life ==
He served as the coach of the Sri Lankan team, and has also served in its administration. He also coached Mahela Jayawardene at the Nalanda College and was also a Under-19 national coach of Russel Arnold. He became an administrator at the Bloomfield Club in 1991 after the end of the ban which he served for being part of Sri Lanka's Arosa tour of South Africa in 1982.

Warnapura was an official of the Asian Cricket Council. Warnapura participated as a judge in the reality show Youth With Talent telecasted by Independent Television Network in 2016–17.

== Death ==
In October 2021, Warnapura was admitted to hospital due to a diabetes-related issue, with doctors forced to amputate his left leg. He died on 18 October 2021 while receiving treatment at a private hospital in Colombo.

Preceded by New title	Sri Lankan Test captain 1982	Succeeded by Duleep Mendis
Preceded by Anura Tennekoon	Sri Lankan ODI cricket captain 1979–1982	Succeeded by Duleep Mendis
