= Kalana Wijesiri =

Sri Lankan cricketer (born 2000)

Personal information
- Born: 10 September 2000 (age 26)
- Source: Cricinfo, 28 March 2021

Kalana Wijesiri (born 10 September 2000) is a Sri Lankan cricketer. He made his List A debut on 28 March 2021, for Sri Lanka Air Force Sports Club in the 2020–21 Major Clubs Limited Over Tournament. He made his Twenty20 debut on 22 May 2022, for Sri Lanka Air Force Sports Club in the Major Clubs T20 Tournament.
