= Kavindu Silva =

Sri Lankan cricketer (born 1993)

Personal information
- Born: 12 September 1993 (age 33)
- Source: Cricinfo, 5 March 2021

Kavindu Silva (born 12 September 1993) is a Sri Lankan cricketer. He made his Twenty20 debut on 5 March 2021, for Police Sports Club in the 2020–21 SLC Twenty20 Tournament.
