= Dilum Fernando =

Sri Lankan cricketer (born 1994)

Personal information
- Born: 22 May 1994 (age 32)
- Source: Cricinfo, 13 July 2020

Dilum Fernando (born 22 May 1994) is a Sri Lankan cricketer. He made his first-class debut for Kalutara Town Club in Tier B of the 2018–19 Premier League Tournament on 21 March 2019. He made his Twenty20 debut on 13 March 2021, for Bloomfield Cricket and Athletic Club in the 2020–21 SLC Twenty20 Tournament.
