= Nishan Madushka =

Sri Lankan cricketer

Personal information
- Full name: Kottasinghakkarage Nishan Madushka Fernando
- Born: 10 September 1999 (age 27); Moratuwa, Sri Lanka
- Batting: Right-handed
- Role: Wicket-keeper

International information
- National side: Sri Lanka
- Test debut (cap 163): 17 March 2023 v New Zealand
- Last Test: 15 August 2026 v India
- ODI debut (cap 214): 20 October 2024 v West Indies
- Last ODI: 14 February 2025 v Australia

Domestic team information
- Years: Team
- 2018/19: Colts Cricket Club
- 2018/19: Police Sports Club
- 2020–present: Ragama Cricket Club
- 2022: Colombo Stars

Career statistics
Competition	Test	ODI	FC	LA
Matches	10	4	69	73
Runs scored	571	158	4,993	2,616
Batting average	33.58	52.66	47.55	41.52
100s/50s	1/2	0/2	14/22	5/16
Top score	205	69	300*	165
Catches/stumpings	15/0	0/0	98/5	64/23
Medal record
Representing Sri Lanka
Men's Cricket
South Asian Games
Silver medal – second place	2019 Kathmandu/Pokhara	Team
- Source: Cricinfo, 5 February 2025

Kottasinghakkarage Nishan Madushka Fernando (born 10 September 1999) is a Sri Lankan cricketer currently plays as the opening batsman for national Test team. In April 2018, he was named in Dambulla's squad for the 2018 Super Provincial One Day Tournament. He made his List A debut for Dambulla in the 2018 Super Provincial One Day Tournament on 2 May 2018. Prior to his List A debut, he was named in Sri Lanka's squad for the 2018 Under-19 Cricket World Cup.

== Domestic career ==
In August 2018, he was named in Galle's squad the 2018 SLC T20 League. He made his Twenty20 debut for Galle on 25 August 2018.

In October 2020, he was drafted by the Kandy Tuskers for the inaugural edition of the Lanka Premier League. In August 2021, he was named in the SLC Blues team for the 2021 SLC Invitational T20 League tournament.

He is the highest run scorer in Major League Tournament 2022, scoring 1229 runs in 15 innings with highest score of unbeaten 300 runs.

== Youth career ==
In December 2018, he was named in Sri Lanka team for the 2018 ACC Emerging Teams Asia Cup. He made his first-class debut for Colts Cricket Club in the 2018–19 Premier League Tournament on 11 January 2019.

In November 2019, he was named in Sri Lanka's squad for the 2019 ACC Emerging Teams Asia Cup in Bangladesh. Later the same month, he was named in Sri Lanka's squad for the men's cricket tournament at the 2019 South Asian Games. The Sri Lanka team won the silver medal, after they lost to Bangladesh by seven wickets in the final.

In April 2022, Sri Lanka Cricket (SLC) named him in the Sri Lanka Emerging Team's squad for their tour to England. In the first match of the tour, he scored 269 against Kent, which was the highest first-class score by a Sri Lankan cricketer in England, overtaking Aravinda de Silva who scored 255 for Kent in 1995. In June 2022, he was named in the Sri Lanka A squad for their matches against Australia A during Australia's tour of Sri Lanka.

On 26 January 2023, During warm up match against England Lions, Madushka scored unbeaten 150 and eventually Sri Lanka XI won the match by 4 wickets.

On 3 February 2023, first unofficial test match against England Lions, Madushka scored his 10th first class century. He scored 241 runs from 423 balls hitting 25 boundaries and four sixes. Finally the match ended draw.

On 10 February 2023, second unofficial test match against England Lions, Madushka scored his 11th first class century. He scored 100 runs from 125 deliveries hitting 16 boundaries and one six. Finally the match ended draw.

On 6 June 2023, second unofficial ODI match against South Africa A team, Madushka scored his third List A century. While chasing down 175 runs, he scored unbeaten 107 runs from 85 deliveries hitting 13 boundaries and two sixes. Finally Sri Lanka A team successfully chased down the target in 29th over and won the match by 7 wickets.

== International career ==
In February 2023, Madushka was named in Sri Lanka's Test squad for their series against New Zealand. He made his Test debut in the second Test on 17 March 2023.

On 27 April 2023, the match against Ireland Madushka scored his maiden test century, which later converted into a double hundred. He scored 205 runs from 339 deliveries hitting 22 boundaries and one six. Finally, Sri Lanka won the match and the series.
