= Nimanda Madushanka =

Sri Lankan cricketer (born 1992)

Personal information
- Full name: Nimanda Madushanka Subasinghe
- Born: 27 July 1992 (age 34); Galle, Sri Lanka
- Batting: Right-handed
- Bowling: Right-arm fast medium
- Source: ESPNcricinfo, 21 December 2016

Nimanda Madushanka (born 27 July 1992) is a Sri Lankan cricketer. He made his first-class debut for Nondescripts Cricket Club in the 2014–15 Premier Trophy on 27 February 2015. He made his List A debut for Ampara District in the 2016–17 Districts One Day Tournament on 15 March 2017. He made his Twenty20 debut for Badureliya Sports Club in the 2017–18 SLC Twenty20 Tournament on 24 February 2018.
