= Wasantha Warnapura =

Sri Lankan cricketer (born 1981)

Personal information
- Born: 29 June 1981 (age 45)
- Source: Cricinfo, 4 March 2021

Wasantha Warnapura (born 29 June 1981) is a Sri Lankan cricketer. He made his Twenty20 debut on 4 March 2021, for Kalutara Town Club in the 2020–21 SLC Twenty20 Tournament.
