= Vishva Wijeratne =

Sri Lankan cricketer (born 1992)

Personal information
- Full name: Kappetipola Lekamralalage Vishva Deemantha Wijeratne
- Born: 29 June 1992 (age 34); Chilaw, Sri Lanka
- Source: ESPNcricinfo, 9 December 2016

Vishva Wijeratne (born 29 June 1992) is a Sri Lankan cricketer. He made his first-class debut for Sinhalese Sports Club in the 2012–13 Premier Trophy on 15 March 2013.
