= Gayan Maneeshan =

Sri Lankan cricketer (born 1991)

Personal information
- Full name: Wijendra Waduge Anoj Gayan Maneeshan
- Born: 25 February 1991 (age 35); Kurunegala, Sri Lanka
- Batting: Left-handed
- Bowling: Right-arm legbreak
- Role: Wicket-keeper
- Source: ESPNcricinfo, 7 January 2017

Gayan Maneeshan (born 25 February 1991) is a Sri Lankan cricketer. He is a left-handed wicket-keeper batsman. He made his first-class debut for Sinhalese Sports Club in the 2010–11 Premier Trophy on 18 March 2011.
