= Danal Hemananda =

Sri Lankan cricketer (born 2003)

Personal information
- Full name: Gawasin Arachchige Danal Dilmith Hemananda
- Born: 24 May 2003 (age 23); Pasyala, Sri Lanka
- Batting: Left-handed
- Bowling: Left-arm fast
- Role: All-rounder
- Source: Cricinfo, 6 March 2021

Danal Hemananda (born 24 May 2003) is a Sri Lankan cricketer. Who has played for Sri Lanka Under 19 Cricket Team and He also played for the Sri Lanka Emerging National Cricket Team. He made his Twenty20 debut on 6 March 2021, for Police Sports Club in the 2020–21 SLC Twenty20 Tournament. He is a Bowling allrounder who can score quick runs with the bat.

He made his First Class debut on 19 August 2022, for Burger Recreation Club in the Major League Tournament 2022. Prior to his First class debut he was named to the Team Dambulla in the National Super League 2023, which they won the Championship in the tournament. He made his List A debut on 29 June 2022, for Burger Recreation Club in the Major Clubs Limited Over Tournament 2022.

He studied in St.Peter’s College Colombo 04
