= Nipun Haggalla =

Sri Lankan cricketer (born 1997)

Personal information
- Born: 13 November 1997 (age 28); Colombo
- Nickname: Hagga
- Batting: Left-handed
- Role: Wicket-keeper-batsman
- Source: Cricinfo, 9 December 2017

Nipun Haggalla (born 13 November 1997) is a Sri Lankan cricketer. He made his first-class debut for Bloomfield Cricket and Athletic Club in the 2017–18 Premier League Tournament on 8 December 2017. He made his Twenty20 debut for Bloomfield Cricket and Athletic Club in the 2017–18 SLC Twenty20 Tournament on 24 February 2018. He made his List A debut for Bloomfield Cricket and Athletic Club in the 2018–19 Premier Limited Overs Tournament on 8 March 2019.
