= Madawa Warnapura =

Sri Lankan cricketer (born 1988)

Personal information
- Born: 4 June 1988 (age 38); Colombo, Sri Lanka
- Relatives: Bandula Warnapura (father); Malinda Warnapura (cousin)
- Source: ESPNcricinfo, 31 January 2017

Madawa Warnapura (born 4 June 1988) is a Sri Lankan cricketer. He made his first-class debut for Sri Lanka Air Force Sports Club in the 2008–09 Premier Trophy on 21 November 2008. He is the son of former Sri Lankan cricket captain Bandula Warnapura and the cousin of former Sri Lankan cricketer Malinda Warnapura. Madawa was educated at Nalanda College, Colombo.

In March 2018, he was named in Galle's squad for the 2017–18 Super Four Provincial Tournament. The following month, he was also named in Galle's squad for the 2018 Super Provincial One Day Tournament.
