= Rashmika Mevan =

Sri Lankan cricketer (born 2001)

Personal information
- Full name: Ranasinghe Pathiranage Rashmika Mevan Dulanjana
- Born: 17 October 2001 (age 25)
- Source: Cricinfo, 3 April 2021

Ranasinghe Pathiranage Rashmika Mevan Dulanjana (born 17 October 2001) is a Sri Lankan cricketer. He made his List A debut on 3 April 2021, for Ace Capital Cricket Club in the 2020–21 Major Clubs Limited Over Tournament.
