= Ragama Cricket Club =

Personnel
- Captain: (Sri Lanka) Janith Liyanage

Team information
- Colours: Navy blue

History
- Premier Trophy wins: none
- Premier Limited Overs Tournament wins: none
- Twenty20 Tournament wins: 1 (2006–07)

Ragama Cricket Club are a first-class cricket team based in Ragama, Sri Lanka. Their home ground is the Free Trade Zone Sports Complex.

== History ==
Ragama Cricket Club was formed in 1989. It achieved promotion to first-class status in 2001.

At the start of 2018 Ragama had played 165 first-class matches, for 43 wins, 34 losses and 88 draws.

== Current squad ==
Players with international caps are listed in bold

Name	Age	Batting style	Bowling style	Notes
Batsmen
Saminda Fernando	29	Right-handed	Right-arm off spin	Vice-captain
**Udara Jayasundera**	34	Left-handed	Right-arm leg spin	
**Lahiru Thirimanne**	36	Left-handed	Right-arm medium-fast	
Avishka Tharindu	24	Right-handed	Right-arm medium	
Supeshala Jayathilake	32	Left-handed	Slow left-arm orthodox	
All-rounders
**Janith Liyanage**	30	Right-handed	Right-arm medium-fast	Captain
Dellon Peiris	25	Right-handed	Slow left-arm orthodox	
Sanjula Bandara	26	Right-handed	Right-arm off spin	
Yohan Liyanage	24	Left-handed	Right-arm off spin	
Wicket-keepers
Nishan Madushka	26	Right-handed		
Lahiru Dawatage	22	Right-handed		
Spin Bowlers
Kalhara Senarathne	25	Left-handed	Right-arm off spin	
Shashika Dulshan	25	Left-handed	Slow left-arm unorthodox	
Janaka Sampath	37	Right-handed	Right-arm leg spin	
Pace Bowlers
Ishan Jayaratne	36	Right-handed	Right-arm fast-medium	
Nipun Malinga	25	Left-handed	Right-arm fast-medium	

== Records ==
Ragama's highest score is 318 by Udara Jayasundera against Sinhalese Sports Club in 2015–16. The best bowling figures are 8 for 29 by Upul Indrasiri against Saracens Sports Club in 2006–07.

=== Partnership records ===
- 1st – 216 DA Ranatunga & HGSP Fernando
- 2nd – 161 PHD Premadasa & EFMU Fernando
- 3rd – 143 SA Perera & SI de Saram
- 4th – 255 EFMU Fernando & KAS Jayasinghe
- 5th – 188 WDDS Perera & EFMU Fernando
- 6th – 191 EFMU Fernando & S Arangalla
- 7th – 142 S Arangalla & KNS Fernando
- 8th – 109 KNS Fernando & S Chandana
- 9th – 79 ED Diaz & RD Dissanayake
- 10th – 63 SA Perera & SADU Indrasiri
