= 2017–18 Premier League Tournament Tier B =

Cricket tournament

- Dates: 15 December 2017 – 18 February 2018
- Administrator: Sri Lanka Cricket
- Cricket format: First-class cricket
- Tournament format: Round-robin
- Host: Sri Lanka
- Champions: Negombo Cricket Club
- Participants: 9
- Matches: 36
- Most runs: Kashif Naved (805)
- Most wickets: Gayan Sirisoma (55)

The 2017–18 Premier League Tournament Tier B was the second division of the 30th season of first-class cricket in Sri Lanka's Premier Trophy. The tournament was contested by nine teams, starting on 15 December 2017 and concluding on 18 February 2018.

Panadura Sports Club finished top of the table in the 2016–17 Tier B tournament, but it was runners-up Sri Lanka Ports Authority Cricket Club who were promoted to Tier A due to a match-fixing scandal that resulted in a match between Panadura SC and Kalutara Physical Culture Club in January 2017 being declared null and void. They were replaced in Tier B by Galle Cricket Club after they were relegated from the 2016–17 Tier A tournament. In another change from the previous season, Negombo Cricket Club replaced Kalutara Physical Culture Club, who dropped out of the first-class system.

Negombo Cricket Club won the tournament and secured promotion to Tier A, after finishing top of the points table ahead of Lankan Cricket Club.

== Points table ==
Team	Pld	W	L	D	T	Pts
Negombo Cricket Club	8	1	0	6	1	87.74
Lankan Cricket Club	8	2	0	6	0	86.91
Galle Cricket Club	8	1	2	5	0	76.39
Kalutara Town Club	8	1	0	6	1	76.25
Sri Lanka Air Force Sports Club	8	2	3	3	0	71.71
Kurunegala Youth Cricket Club	8	0	1	7	0	65.72
Panadura Sports Club	8	1	1	6	0	64.34
Sri Lanka Navy Sports Club	8	1	0	7	0	63.19
Police Sports Club	8	0	2	6	0	58.56

Promoted to Tier A

== Matches ==
=== Round 1 ===
15–17 December 2017
Scorecard

Negombo Cricket Club	v	Lankan Cricket Club
223 (74 overs); Tharindu Weerasinghe 70 (124); Rajeewa Weerasinghe 5/43 (23 overs)		136 (52.1 overs); Chanaka Ruwansiri 37 (47); Sehan Weerasinghe 3/25 (10 overs)
236/7d (69.3 overs); Akeel Inham 82 (169); Thushira Madanayake 3/18 (5.3 overs)		128/9 (68 overs); Geeth Kumara 86* (200); Roshen Fernando 4/40 (18 overs)

Match drawn
Kadirana Cricket Grounds, Gampaha
Umpires: RP Massalage and Vidura Prasad

- Negombo Cricket Club won the toss and elected to bat.
- Nishantha Fernando, Inosha Gunawardene (Lankan Cricket Club), Lasith Croospulle, Roshen Fernando, Akeel Inham, Prasansana Jayamanne, Dilasri Lokubandara, Sandaruwan Rodrigo and Sehan Weerasinghe (Negombo Cricket Club) all made their first-class debuts.

15–17 December 2017
Scorecard

Panadura Sports Club	v	Police Sports Club
250 (91.2 overs); Kashif Naved 111 (151); Nimesh Vimukthi 5/62 (27.2 overs)		196 (62.1 overs); Akila Lakshan 87 (109); Danussika Bandara 4/68 (21 overs)
265/7d (77 overs); Kashif Naved 94 (113); Nimesh Vimukthi 3/73 (20 overs)		118/6 (33 overs); Srimantha Wijeyeratne 29 (37); Rasika Fernando 3/26 (12 overs)

Match drawn
Police Park Ground, Colombo
Umpires: Sagara Kumara and Saman Mohan de Silva

- Police Sports Club won the toss and elected to field.
- Sakuranga Fonseka, Lasith Lakshan, Anuththara Madawa, Rashmika Opatha (Panadura Sports Club), and Srimantha Wijeyeratne (Police Sports Club) all made their first-class debuts.

15–17 December 2017
Scorecard

Galle Cricket Club	v	Sri Lanka Air Force Sports Club
177 (65 overs); Chanaka Wijesinghe 40 (75); Shohan Rangika 4/46 (11 overs)		164 (52.3 overs); Buddika Sandaruwan 40* (55); Gayan Sirisoma 3/38 (19.3 overs)
197 (70.2 overs); Chanaka Wijesinghe 52 (90); Dilip Tharaka 3/24 (11 overs)		213/6 (67.2 overs); Dulash Udayanga 100* (198); Charitha Buddhika 3/24 (9 overs)

Sri Lanka Air Force Sports Club won by 4 wickets
Air Force Ground, Katunayake
Umpires: Maurice Dela Zilva and Pradeep Udawatta

- Sri Lanka Air Force Sports Club won the toss and elected to field.
- Supun Withanaarachchi (Galle Cricket Club), Kasun Abeyrathne and Lahiru Fernando (Sri Lanka Air Force Sports Club) all made their first-class debuts.

15–17 December 2017
Scorecard

Kurunegala Youth Cricket Club	v	Sri Lanka Navy Sports Club
253 (83.2 overs); Hashan Prabath 84 (164); Sudara Dakshina 3/49 (26.2 overs)		402/9d (91.1 overs); Kusal Edussooriya 104 (121); Thusith de Soysa 8/137 (35 overs)
202 (69.1 overs); Damith Perera 65 (128); Ishan Abeysekara 3/47 (13.1 overs)		54/2 (11.4 overs); Asiri de Silva 27 (28); Ruwantha Ekanayake 1/4 (2 overs)

Sri Lanka Navy Sports Club won by 8 wickets
Welagedara Stadium, Kurunegala
Umpires: Sanjeewa Fernando and Ravindra Kottahachchi

- Kurunegala Youth Cricket Club won the toss and elected to bat.
- Sarinda Dassanayake, Thusith de Soysa, ND Kaushalya, Kalhan Sineth, Tharinda Wijesinghe (Kurunegala Youth Cricket Club), Mohammed Alfar and Nuwan Sampath (Sri Lanka Navy Sports Club) all made their first-class debuts.

=== Round 2 ===
21–23 December 2017
Scorecard

Sri Lanka Navy Sports Club	v	Police Sports Club
274 (93.3 overs); Buddika Hasaranga 64 (103); Kalyana Rathnapriya 3/54 (18.3 overs)		331 (103.3 overs); Dinusha Fernando 71 (128); Sudara Dakshina 6/92 (36.3 overs)
159/5 (41 overs); Mohammed Alfar 48 (55); Hasitha Nirmal 3/49 (15 overs)

Match drawn
Tyronne Fernando Stadium, Moratuwa
Umpires: Sanjeewa Fernando and Suranga Perera

- Sri Lanka Navy Sports Club won the toss and elected to bat.
- Vibhor Yadav (Police Sports Club) made his first-class debut.

21–23 December 2017
Scorecard

Lankan Cricket Club	v	Sri Lanka Air Force Sports Club
349 (70 overs); Chanaka Ruwansiri 120* (93); Lahiru Fernando 3/69 (14 overs)		192 (45.5 overs); Udayawansha Parakrama 45 (50); Dinushka Malan 4/54 (11 overs)
166/3 (35.5 overs); Maduranga Zoysa 69* (91); Milan Rathnayake 1/15 (3 overs)		320 (75.1 overs) (f/o); Udayawansha Parakrama 101 (144); Navin Kavikara 3/80 (18.1 overs)

Lankan Cricket Club won by 7 wickets
Surrey Village Ground, Maggona
Umpires: Ravindra Kottahachchi and Prageeth Rambukwella

- Sri Lanka Air Force Sports Club won the toss and elected to field.

21–23 December 2017
Scorecard

Panadura Sports Club	v	Kalutara Town Club
380 (115.1 overs); Vinodh Perera 138 (163); Matheesha Perera 3/66 (22 overs)		280 (84 overs); Sameera Sadamal 102 (129); Danussika Bandara 5/117 (33 overs)
88/5 (38 overs); Sansaka Fernando 21 (28)

Match drawn
Panadura Esplanade, Panadura
Umpires: Nilan De Silva and Saman Mohan de Silva

- Panadura Sports Club won the toss and elected to bat.
- Sansaka Fernando (Panadura Sports Club) made his first-class debut.

21–23 December 2017
Scorecard

Negombo Cricket Club	v	Galle Cricket Club
159 (62.4 overs); Srihan Anuruddhika 38 (82); Gohar Faiz 6/60 (16.4 overs)		177 (85.4 overs); Aruna Dharmasena 71* (193); Umega Chaturanga 6/56 (37.4 overs)
234/3d (59.2 overs); Ravindra Karunaratne 101* (78); Gohar Faiz 2/54 (11 overs)		68/0 (16 overs); Hasantha Fernando 50* (46)

Match drawn
Galle International Stadium, Galle
Umpires: Nilantha Bopage and Ranganath Prasanna

- Galle Cricket Club won the toss and elected to field.
- Suresh de Silva (Galle Cricket Club) and Srihan Anuruddhika (Negombo Cricket Club) both made their first-class debuts.

=== Round 3 ===
28–30 December 2017
Scorecard

Sri Lanka Air Force Sports Club	v	Police Sports Club
234 (59.1 overs); Raju Gayashan 58 (97); Nimesh Vimukthi 5/84 (22 overs)		302 (98.5 overs); Samith Dushantha 121 (185); Shohan Rangika 5/46 (25.4 overs)
261/8d (65.3 overs); Dulash Udayanga 70 (128); Nimesh Vimukthi 4/89 (23 overs)		127/6 (40 overs); Samith Dushantha 46* (61); Buddika Sandaruwan 2/28 (10 overs)

Match drawn
Air Force Ground, Katunayake
Umpires: Nilan De Silva and Kitsiri Jayaweera

- Sri Lanka Air Force Sports Club won the toss and elected to bat.
- Dilum Weerarathne (Sri Lanka Air Force Sports Club) and Chamod Piumal (Police Sports Club)

28–30 December 2017
Scorecard

Negombo Cricket Club	v	Kalutara Town Club
221 (92.2 overs); Praveen Fernando 86 (193); Matheesha Perera 5/55 (20.2 overs)		193 (65.2 overs); Suresh Niroshan 89 (111); Umega Chaturanga 7/79 (28.2 overs)
206/8d (71 overs); Sehan Weerasinghe 53* (87); Matheesha Perera 4/95 (25 overs)		234 (44 overs); Geeth Perera 87 (99); Umega Chaturanga 5/112 (22 overs)

Match tied
Kadirana Cricket Grounds, Gampaha
Umpires: SB Semasinghe and Ranjith Vishwakula

- Negombo Cricket Club won the toss and elected to bat.
- Udith Fernando and AKT Rukshan (Negombo Cricket Club) both made their first-class debuts.

28–30 December 2017
Scorecard

Lankan Cricket Club	v	Kurunegala Youth Cricket Club
248 (83.1 overs); Chanaka Ruwansiri 81 (107); Keshan Wijerathne 2/28 (10 overs)		297 (123.2 overs); Dhanushka Dharmasiri 52 (116); Navin Kavikara 3/67 (32 overs)
224/8 (61 overs); Rajeewa Weerasinghe 54* (92); Sarinda Dassanayake 2/21 (11 overs)

Match drawn
Army Ground, Panagoda
Umpires: Deepal Gunawardene and Asanga Jayasooriya

- Lankan Cricket Club won the toss and elected to bat.
- Charith Mendis and Shiwakumar Tyron (Kurunegala Youth Cricket Club)

28–30 December 2017
Scorecard

Panadura Sports Club	v	Sri Lanka Navy Sports Club
375 (92.1 overs); Kashif Naved 192 (208); Chathuranga Dikkumbura 3/45 (11 overs)		444 (146.3 overs); Dushan Hemantha 193 (382); Mohammad Rameez 3/52 (20 overs)
153/3 (33 overs); Sakuranga Fonseka 57* (98); Dushan Hemantha 1/14 (5 overs)

Match drawn
Panadura Esplanade, Panadura
Umpires: Lyndon Hannibal and Saman Mohan de Silva

- Sri Lanka Navy Sports Club won the toss and elected to field.
- Ashen Kavinda, TLK Thambavita (Panadura Sports Club), Chathuranga Dikkumbura and WACP Wijayalath (Sri Lanka Navy Sports Club) all made their first-class debuts.

=== Round 4 ===
5–7 January 2018
Scorecard

Sri Lanka Air Force Sports Club	v	Sri Lanka Navy Sports Club
304 (83.5 overs); Dulash Udayanga 115 (155); Tharushan Iddamalgoda 4/39 (9 overs)		285 (75.3 overs); Buddika Hasaranga 93 (130); Shohan Rangika 5/88 (21.3 overs)
326/6d (89.4 overs); Udayawansha Parakrama 155 (242); Kusal Edussooriya 3/54 (18.4 overs)		108/3 (18 overs); Mohammed Alfar 46 (40); Buddika Sandaruwan 3/37 (7 overs)

Match drawn
Navy Ground, Welisara
Umpires: Gamini Dissanayake and Kapila Kottahachchi

- Sri Lanka Navy Sports Club won the toss and elected to field.
- Ravindu Gunawardene, Chaamikara Hewage and Heshan Umendra (Sri Lanka Air Force Sports Club) all made their first-class debuts.

5–7 January 2018
Scorecard

Police Sports Club	v	Galle Cricket Club
95 (28.3 overs); Samith Dushantha 23 (31); Gayan Sirisoma 5/29 (11.3 overs)		315 (107 overs); Hasantha Fernando 65 (110); Nimesh Vimukthi 6/103 (46 overs)
228 (69.3 overs); Nimesh Vimukthi 65 (125); Gayan Sirisoma 6/91 (29.3 overs)		11/0 (1.5 overs); Lasith Fernando 10* (7)

Galle Cricket Club won by 10 wickets
Police Park Ground, Colombo
Umpires: Hemantha Boteju and Lyndon Hannibal

- Police Sports Club won the toss and elected to bat.
- Krishan Abesooriya (Galle Cricket Club) made his first-class debut.

5–7 January 2018
Scorecard

Panadura Sports Club	v	Lankan Cricket Club
218 (60.1 overs); Kashif Naved 50 (63); Navin Kavikara 4/80 (19.1 overs)		269 (53.4 overs); Lakshan Rodrigo 103 (96); Suresh Peiris 7/82 (17.4 overs)
334 (92.1 overs); Sakuranga Fonseka 75 (142); Chanaka Ruwansiri 4/91 (23 overs)		208/8 (63 overs); Chanaka Ruwansiri 46 (82); Danussika Bandara 5/51 (23 overs)

Match drawn
Panadura Esplanade, Panadura
Umpires: Nilan De Silva and Pradeep Udawatta

- Lankan Cricket Club won the toss and elected to field.

5–7 January 2018
Scorecard

Kurunegala Youth Cricket Club	v	Kalutara Town Club
405/9d (126 overs); Damith Perera 88 (138); Lakshan Jayasinghe 2/56 (31 overs)		305 (92.2 overs); Nipuna Kariyawasam 92 (123); Kalhan Sineth 3/73 (25 overs)
200/4 (48 overs); Sarinda Dassanayake 68 (133); Lakshan Jayasinghe 2/49 (19 overs)

Match drawn
Welagedara Stadium, Kurunegala
Umpires: Ranganath Prasanna and Prageeth Rambukwella

- Kalutara Town Club won the toss and elected to field.
- Shanaka Sampath (Kalutara Town Club), Sajith de Silva and Prabhash Keppitipola (Kurunegala Youth Cricket Club) all made their first-class debuts.

=== Round 5 ===
12–14 January 2018
Scorecard

Sri Lanka Navy Sports Club	v	Negombo Cricket Club
342 (111.4 overs); Kusal Edussooriya 121 (214); 4/145 (49 overs)		326 (128.2 overs); Prasansana Jayamanne 77 (252); Ishan Abeysekara 4/140 (41.2 overs)
157/6 (50 overs); Dushan Hemantha 45 (74); Umega Chaturanga 4/58 (25 overs)

Match drawn
Navy Ground, Welisara
Umpires: Palitha de Alwis and Saman Mohan de Silva

- Negombo Cricket Club won the toss and elected to field.
- Savin Gunasekara, Dilshan Lekamge and Suraj Weerasinghe (Sri Lanka Navy Sports Club) all made their first-class debuts.

12–13 January 2018
Scorecard

Panadura Sports Club	v	Sri Lanka Air Force Sports Club
176 (46.4 overs); Suresh Peiris 30 (62); Shohan Rangika 5/52 (17 overs)		309 (86.1 overs); Dulash Udayanga 96 (182); Danussika Bandara 3/80 (26 overs)
36 (13.3 overs); Geshan Wimaladharma 8 (10); Milan Priyanath 5/36 (7 overs)

Sri Lanka Air Force Sports Club won by an innings and 97 runs
Panadura Esplanade, Panadura
Umpires: Lyndon Hannibal and Eric Kannangara

- Sri Lanka Air Force Sports Club won the toss and elected to field.
- Kaumal Nanayakkara (Panadura Sports Club) made his first-class debut.

12–14 January 2018
Scorecard

Police Sports Club	v	Kurunegala Youth Cricket Club
270 (94.1 overs); Dinusha Fernando 61 (119); Keshan Wijerathne 5/37 (13.1 overs)		156 (52.2 overs); Dhanushka Dharmasiri 67 (101); Nimesh Vimukthi 5/60 (20.2 overs)
271/6d (62 overs); Hasitha Lakmal de Silva 99 (152); Malith Cooray 1/10 (2 overs)		230/6 (56 overs); Damith Perera 84 (115); Nimesh Vimukthi 3/103 (23 overs)

Match drawn
Welagedara Stadium, Kurunegala
Umpires: Dilshan de Silva and Nilantha Semasinghe

- Kurunegala Youth Cricket Club won the toss elected to field.

12–14 January 2018
Scorecard

Kalutara Town Club	v	Galle Cricket Club
379 (112.5 overs); Eranga Rathnayake 133* (261); Gayan Sirisoma 7/115 (48 overs)		274 (86 overs); Chanaka Wijesinghe 106 (65); Matheesha Perera 3/54 (24 overs)
191/4 (45 overs); Matheesha Perera 86 (84); Viraj Perera 2/25 (7 overs)

Match drawn
Tyronne Fernando Stadium, Moratuwa
Umpires: Sisira Kumara Perera and Krishantha Rodrigo

- Kalutara Town Club won the toss and elected to bat.
- Indeera Gallage (Galle Cricket Club) made his first-class debut.

=== Round 6 ===
19–21 January 2018
Scorecard

Kurunegala Youth Cricket Club	v	Sri Lanka Air Force Sports Club
286 (104); Sarinda Dassanayake 63 (176); Hashan Harshana James 3/29 (8 overs)		158 (52.5 overs); Chaamikara Hewage 45 (99); Shiwakumar Tyron 4/29 (8 overs)
196 (54.5 overs); Keshan Wijerathne 62* (98); Chathura Samantha 6/57 (17 overs)		261/8 (54 overs); Suminda Lakshan 75 (98); Sarinda Dassanayake 2/36 (5 overs)

Match drawn
Air Force Ground, Katunayake
Umpires: Eric Kannangara and Ranganath Prasanna

- Kurunegala Youth Cricket Club won the toss and elected to bat.
- Chathura Samantha (Sri Lanka Air Force Sports Club) made his first-class debut.

19–21 January 2018
Scorecard

Negombo Cricket Club	v	Police Sports Club
178 (63.2 overs); Umega Chaturanga 56 (79); Nimesh Vimukthi 5/66 (31 overs)		100 (51.4 overs); Dinusha Fernando 41 (117); Umega Chaturanga 5/33 (20.4 overs)
276/9d (84.4 overs); Praveen Fernando 70 (121); Kalyana Rathnapriya 5/98 (28 overs)		288/9 (80 overs); Tharindu Dilshan 102 (124); Sehan Weerasinghe 3/39 (19 overs)

Match drawn
Kadirana Cricket Grounds, Gampaha
Umpires: Thilak Fernando and RP Massalage

- Police Sports Club won the toss and elected to field.
- Nishantha Kumara (Police Sports Club) made his first-class debut.

19–21 January 2018
Scorecard

Lankan Cricket Club	v	Kalutara Town Club
534/8d (111.1 overs); Shasheen Fernando 122 (181); Madhawa Nimesh 2/77 (15 overs)		296 (82.3 overs); Eranga Rathnayake 130* (177); Geeth Kumara 4/34 (16.3 overs)
		263/5 (71 overs) (f/o); Nilushan Nonis 117 (158); Thushira Madanayake 2/34 (5 overs)

Match drawn
Surrey Village Ground, Maggona
Umpires: Nilantha Bopage and Palitha de Alwis

- Lankan Cricket Club won the toss and elected to bat.

19–21 January 2018
Scorecard

Galle Cricket Club	v	Panadura Sports Club
217 (62.1 overs); Hasantha Fernando 55 (89); Vinodh Perera 4/44 (18 overs)		433 (112.1 overs); Kashif Naved 159 (178); Gayan Sirisoma 4/102 (42.1 overs)
191 (44.2 overs); Damitha Hunukumbura 70 (68); Danussika Bandara 4/41 (9.2 overs)

Panadura Sports Club won by an innings and 25 runs
Galle International Stadium, Galle
Umpires: Sanjeewa Fernando and Kapila Kottahachchi

- Galle Cricket Club won the toss and elected to bat.
- Chathura Lakshan (Galle Cricket Club) made his first-class debut.

=== Round 7 ===
25–27 January 2018
Scorecard

Galle Cricket Club	v	Lankan Cricket Club
269 (105.3 overs); Harsha Rajapaksha 63 (102); Rajeewa Weerasinghe 4/68 (29.3 overs)		155 (74.2 overs); Lakshan Rodrigo 52 (36); Gayan Sirisoma 6/69 (20.2 overs)
196/9d (69.3 overs); Chanaka Wijesinghe 52 (98); Rajeewa Weerasinghe 4/63 (26 overs)		237/6 (42 overs); Maduranga Zoysa 88 (92); Gohar Faiz 4/54 (12 overs)

Match drawn
Army Ground, Mattegoda
Umpires: Dilshan de Silva and Thilak Fernando

- Lankan Cricket Club won the toss and elected to field.
- Thanura Gunasekera (Lankan Cricket Club) made his first-class debut.

26–28 January 2018
Scorecard

Sri Lanka Navy Sports Club	v	Kalutara Town Club
289 (86.2 overs); Ishan Abeysekara 113 (131); Pasindu Madushan 5/90 (33 overs)		322 (96 overs); Madhawa Nimesh 82 (168); Ishan Abeysekara 5/123 (32 overs)
222/6d (58 overs); Buddika Hasaranga 76 (102); Pasindu Madushan 3/58 (20 overs)		123/2 (27 overs); Sameera Sadamal 49* (68); Tharushan Iddamalgoda 1/11 (2 overs)

Match drawn
Navy Ground, Welisara
Umpires: RP Massalage and Nilantha Semasinghe

- Sri Lanka Navy Sports Club won the toss and elected to bat.

26–28 January 2018
Scorecard

Negombo Cricket Club	v	Sri Lanka Air Force Sports Club
318 (94.3 overs); Ravindra Karunaratne 118 (174); Buddika Sandaruwan 6/106 (38.3 overs)		165 (53.3 overs); Dulash Udayanga 51 (117); Umega Chaturanga 4/54 (23.3 overs)
85/6 (22.5 overs); Ravindra Karunaratne 47* (56); Buddika Sandaruwan 4/23 (10 overs)		237 (60.3 overs) (f/o); Roscoe Thattil 66 (66); Umega Chaturanga 6/106 (29 overs)

Negombo Cricket Club won by 4 wickets
Kadirana Cricket Grounds, Gampaha
Umpires: Kitsiri Jayaweera and Upul Wewage

- Negombo Cricket Club won the toss and elected to bat.

26–28 January 2018
Scorecard

Kurunegala Youth Cricket Club	v	Panadura Sports Club
374 (100.1 overs); Ruwantha Ekanayake 111 (167); Anuththara Madawa 4/92 (19 overs)		358 (115.2 overs); Vishva Chathuranga 119 (139); Thusith de Soysa 3/67 (30.2 overs)
253/6 (50.2 overs); Damith Perera 112* (116); Vinodh Perera 2/42 (9 overs)

Match drawn
Welagedara Stadium, Kurunegala
Umpires: Sanjeewa Fernando and Sisira Kumara Perera

- Kurunegala Youth Cricket Club won the toss and elected to bat.

=== Round 8 ===
1–3 February 2018
Scorecard

Lankan Cricket Club	v	Sri Lanka Navy Sports Club
277 (89.4 overs); Lakshan Rodrigo 66 (56); Dushan Hemantha 7/62 (19.4 overs)		239 (86.2 overs); Kusal Edussooriya 92* (190); Chanaka Ruwansiri 2/28 (12 overs)
260/7d (57 overs); Geeth Kumara 65 (74); Ishan Abeysekara 3/93 (18 overs)		213/8 (36 overs); Mohammed Alfar 46 (35); Navin Kavikara 4/84 (14 overs)

Match drawn
Navy Ground, Welisara
Umpires: Susantha Dissanayake and Ranjith Vishwakula

- Lankan Cricket Club won the toss and elected to bat.
- Buddika Madushan, Thushara Madushanka and Chenutha Wickramasinghe (Sri Lanka Navy Sports Club) all made their first-class debuts.

1–3 February 2018
Scorecard

Negombo Cricket Club	v	Panadura Sports Club
292 (68.1 overs); Praveen Fernando 75 (102); Suresh Peiris 7/108 (20 overs)		250 (93 overs); Shashrika Pussegolla 70 (151); Roshen Fernando 8/61 (24 overs)
306/6d (66 overs); Sehan Weerasinghe 110 * (116); Sameendra Madushan 2/39 (9 overs)		103/4 (13.4 overs); Ashen Kavinda 57* (46); Sehan Weerasinghe 3/57 (6.4 overs)

Match drawn
Panadura Esplanade, Panadura
Umpires: Maurice Dela Zilva and RP Massalage

- Panadura Sports Club won the toss and elected to field.
- Sachin Dalpethado (Negombo Cricket Club) made his first-class debut.

1–3 February 2018
Scorecard

Kalutara Town Club	v	Police Sports Club
283 (88.5 overs); Eranga Rathnayake 69 (110); Geeth Silva 5/76 (19.5 overs)		98 (41.4 overs); Hasitha Lakmal de Silva 34 (58); Pasindu Madushan 5/33 (10 overs)
30/0 (6 overs); Matheesha Perera 16* (23)		430/5d (92 overs); Akila Lakshan 166 (221); Sachin Peiris 2/74 (11.3 overs)

Match drawn
Surrey Village Ground, Maggona
Umpires: Nilantha Bopage and Saman Mohan de Silva

- Kalutara Town Club won the toss and elected to bat.

1–3 February 2018
Scorecard

Kurunegala Youth Cricket Club	v	Galle Cricket Club
210 (91.2 overs); Hashan Prabath 76 (139); Rajith Priyan 5/63 (26.2 overs)		272 (113.3 overs); Harsha Rajapaksha 54 (102); Thusith de Soysa 7/69 (42.3 overs)
151/5d (40.4 overs); Damith Perera 53 (69); Chathura Lakshan 2/17 (8 overs)

Match drawn
Galle International Stadium, Galle
Umpires: Dilshan de Silva and Saman Mohan de Silva

- Kurunegala Youth Cricket Club won the toss and elected to bat.

=== Round 9 ===
16–18 February 2018
Scorecard

Sri Lanka Air Force Sports Club	v	Kalutara Town Club
226 (69.2 overs); Roscoe Thattil 93 (88); Pasindu Madushan 7/98 (30 overs)		197 (59 overs); Madhawa Nimesh 75 (135); Rashindra Silva 5/54 (14 overs)
147 (65.1 overs); Milan Rathnayake 53 (122); Matheesha Perera 5/44 (20 overs)		178/6 (49.2 overs); Nilushan Nonis 59* (112); Nimesha Mendis 3/42 (15 overs)

Kalutara Town Club won by 4 wickets
Air Force Ground, Katunayake
Umpires: Nilan De Silva and Krishantha Rodrigo

- Sri Lanka Air Force Sports Club won the toss and elected to bat.
- Rashindra Silva (Sri Lanka Air Force Sports Club) made his first-class debut.

16–18 February 2018
Scorecard

Lankan Cricket Club	v	Police Sports Club
242 (77 overs); Lakshan Rodrigo 67 (83); Hasitha Nirmal 4/83 (21 overs)		187 (55.3 overs); Nimesh Vimukthi 56 (83); Rajeewa Weerasinghe 5/66 (22 overs)
310/9d (78 overs); Dinushka Malan 50* (71); Hasitha Nirmal 5/102 (21 overs)		177 (34.1 overs); Samith Dushantha 79 (60); Geeth Kumara 3/20 (9 overs)

Lankan Cricket Club won by 188 runs
Army Ground, Mattegoda
Umpires: Maurice Dela Zilva and Gamini Dissanayake

- Police Sports Club won the toss and elected to field.

16–18 February 2018
Scorecard

Negombo Cricket Club	v	Kurunegala Youth Cricket Club
490/6d (130.2 overs); Prasansana Jayamanne 200* (364); Ruwantha Ekanayake 2/73 (15.2 overs)		310 (86.5 overs); Hashan Prabath 154 (269); Roshen Fernando 5/95 (24.5 overs)
113/6d (20 overs); Akeel Inham 38 (40); Malith Cooray 3/43 (7 overs)		173/4 (31 overs); Charith Mendis 66 (69); Umega Chaturanga 2/50 (15 overs)

Match drawn
Welagedara Stadium, Kurunegala
Umpires: Eric Kannangara and Ravindra Kottahachchi

- Negombo Cricket Club won the toss and elected to bat.

16–18 February 2018
Scorecard

Galle Cricket Club	v	Sri Lanka Navy Sports Club
256 (82.1 overs); Rajith Priyan 87 (160); Sathik Nimalsha 4/64 (17.1 overs)		234 (77 overs); Buddika Hasaranga 88 (135); Gayan Sirisoma 6/81 (33 overs)
226 (74.4 overs); Damitha Hunukumbura 64 (133); Sudara Dakshina 8/80 (34.3 overs)		117/7 (33 overs); Mohammed Alfar 36 (42); Gayan Sirisoma 5/46 (16 overs)

Match drawn
Rangiri Dambulla International Stadium, Dambulla
Umpires: Kitsiri Jayaweera and Kapila Kottahachchi

- Galle Cricket Club won the toss and elected to bat.
- Hareen Buddila and Ravindu Sembukuttige (Galle Cricket Club) both made their first-class debuts.

== See also ==
- 2017–18 Premier League Tournament Tier A
