= 2017–18 Premier Limited Overs Tournament =

Cricket tournament

- Dates: 9 – 25 March 2018
- Administrator: Sri Lanka Cricket
- Cricket format: List A cricket
- Tournament format: Round-robin then knockout
- Host: Sri Lanka
- Champions: Sinhalese Sports Club (8th title)
- Participants: 23
- Player of the series: Shehan Jayasuriya
- Most runs: Lahiru Milantha (448)
- Most wickets: Sachithra Senanayake (17)

The 2017–18 Premier Limited Overs Tournament was a List A cricket competition that took place in Sri Lanka. It was the seventeenth edition of the Premier Limited Overs Tournament, and the first since the 2015–16 edition, after the 2016–17 tournament was cancelled following a legal challenge and replaced by the 2016–17 Districts One Day Tournament. The tournament started on 9 March 2018 and finished on 25 March 2018. Rain affected the first few days of the tournament, with several games ending as a no result.

Following the conclusion of the group stage, Burgher Recreation Club, Chilaw Marians Cricket Club, Colts Cricket Club, Nondescripts Cricket Club, Ragama Cricket Club, Saracens Sports Club, Sinhalese Sports Club and Tamil Union Cricket and Athletic Club progressed to the quarterfinals. Chilaw Marians Cricket Club, Nondescripts Cricket Club, Saracens Sports Club and Sinhalese Sports Club won their quarterfinals to progress to the semi-finals. In the semi-finals, Nondescripts beat Saracens by 89 runs and Sinhalese beat Chilaw Marians by 8 wickets to advance to the tournament final. In the final, Sinhalese Sports Club beat Nondescripts Cricket Club by 4 wickets to win the tournament.

In February 2019, Sri Lanka Cricket named Lahiru Milantha as the tournament's Best Batsman, Sachithra Senanayke as the Best Bowler and Shehan Jayasuriya as the Player of the Tournament.

== Fixtures ==
=== Group stage ===
==== Group A ====
9 March 2018
Scorecard

Sinhalese Sports Club; 220 (50 overs)	v	Saracens Sports Club; 221/6 (42 overs)
Dimuth Karunaratne 65 (72); Saliya Saman 3/33 (10 overs)		Andy Solomons 124 (87); Sachithra Senanayake 2/29 (10 overs)

Saracens Sports Club won by 4 wickets
FTZ Sports Complex, Katunayake
Umpires: Saman Mohan de Silva and Rohitha Kottahachchi

- Saracens Sports Club won the toss and elected to field.
- Thanuka Dabare (Saracens Sports Club) made his List A debut.

10 March 2018
Scorecard

Moors Sports Club; 285/9 (50 overs)	v	Sri Lanka Ports Authority Cricket Club
Irosh Samarasooriya 139 (128); Maduka Liyanapathiranage 4/41 (10 overs)

No result
Moors Sports Club Ground, Colombo
Umpires: Pradeep Udawatta and Chaminda Hathurusingha

- Moors Sports Club won the toss and elected to bat.
- Ramesh Nimantha and Hashan Vimarshana (Sri Lanka Ports Authority Cricket Club) both made their List A debuts.

10 March 2018
Scorecard

Kurunegala Youth Cricket Club; 102/8 (29 overs)	v	Panadura Sports Club
Kalhan Sineth 34* (51); Vinodh Perera 3/16 (5 overs)

No result
Campbell Park, Colombo
Umpires: Eric Kannangara and Keerthi Bandara

- Kurunegala Youth Cricket Club won the toss and elected to bat.
- Ashen Kavinda, Dimantha Fernando, Pubudu Hasanka, TLK Thambavita, Praneeth Wijesena, Tharindu Maduranga (Panadura Sports Club), Charith Mendis, Sarinda Dassanayake, Keshan Wanniarchchi, Kalhan Sineth, Shiwakumar Tyron, Thusith de Soysa and Manelka Dharmadasa (Kurunegala Youth Cricket Club) all made their List A debuts.

11 March 2018
Scorecard

Sri Lanka Ports Authority Cricket Club; 271/9 (50 overs)	v	Kurunegala Youth Cricket Club; 217/7 (50 overs)
Nick Compton 75 (88); Manelka Dharmadasa 5/51 (10 overs)		Hashan Prabath 79 (101); Ranesh Perera 4/19 (10 overs)

Sri Lanka Ports Authority Cricket Club won by 54 runs
FTZ Sports Complex, Katunayake
Umpires: Susantha Dissanayake and Chaminda Hathurusingha

- Kurunegala Youth Cricket Club won the toss and elected to field.
- Tharinda Wijesinghe (Kurunegala Youth Cricket Club) made his List A debut.

12 March 2018
Scorecard

Moors Sports Club; 93/3 (16.2 overs)	v	Sinhalese Sports Club
Irosh Samarasooriya 31 (29); Jeffrey Vandersay 2/30 (4 overs)

No result
Sinhalese Sports Club Ground, Colombo
Umpires: Saman Mohan de Silva and Dilshan de Silva

- Sinhalese Sports Club won the toss and elected to bat.
- Dilan Jayalath (Sinhalese Sports Club) made his List A debut.

13 March 2018
Scorecard

Panadura Sports Club	v	Saracens Sports Club

Match abandoned
Surrey Village, Maggona
Umpires: Ranganath Prasanna and Keerthi Bandara

- No toss.
- No play was possible due to rain.

14 March 2018
Scorecard

Moors Sports Club; 275/8 (50 overs)	v	Panadura Sports Club; 82 (31.3 overs)
Tilaksha Sumanasiri 56 (87); Vinodh Perera 4/56 (10 overs)		Anuththara Madawa 17* (14); Kosala Kulasekara 4/28 (8 overs)

Moors Sports Club won by 193 runs
Moors Sports Club Ground, Colombo
Umpires: Kitsiri Jayaweera and Keerthi Bandara

- Panadura Sports Club won the toss and elected to field.
- Chanuk Dilshan (Moors Sports Club) made his List A debut.

14 March 2018
Scorecard

Kurunegala Youth Cricket Club; 250/9 (50 overs)	v	Saracens Sports Club; 251/4 (38.3 overs)
Sarinda Dassanayake 47 (73); Promod Maduwantha 2/31 (7 overs)		Thanuka Dabare 123 (97); Ruwantha Ekanayake 1/18 (3 overs)

Saracens Sports Club won by 6 wickets
Army Ground, Panagoda
Umpires: Rohitha Kottahachchi and Dilshan de Silva

- Saracens Sports Club won the toss and elected to field.
- Ashen Bandara (Saracens Sports Club) made his List A debut.

14 March 2018
Scorecard

Sinhalese Sports Club; 235 (49.1 overs)	v	Sri Lanka Ports Authority Cricket Club; 161/9 (50 overs)
Dimuth Karunaratne 64 (68); Chanaka Komasaru 4/33 (10 overs)		Ramesh Nimantha 33 (52); Sachithra Senanayake 3/17 (10 overs)

Sinhalese Sports Club won by 74 runs
Sinhalese Sports Club Ground, Colombo
Umpires: Ravindra Kottahachchi and Ranjith Vishwakula

- Sri Lanka Ports Authority Cricket Club won the toss and elected to field.

16 March 2018
Scorecard

Sinhalese Sports Club; 275 (49.5 overs)	v	Kurunegala Youth Cricket Club; 133 (31.4 overs)
Dimuth Karunaratne 132 (149); Kalhan Sineth 5/43 (10 overs)		Charith Mendis 53 (43); Charith Asalanka 3/12 (4 overs)

Sinhalese Sports Club won by 142 runs
Welagedara Stadium, Kurunegala
Umpires: Keerthi Bandara and Hemantha Boteju

- Kurunegala Youth Cricket Club won the toss and elected to field.
- Chandima Vijayabandara (Kurunegala Youth Cricket Club) made his List A debut.

16 March 2018
Scorecard

Moors Sports Club; 220/9 (50 overs)	v	Saracens Sports Club; 221/5 (46 overs)
Irosh Samarasooriya 68 (84); Roshan Jayatissa 3/38 (10 overs)		Gamindu Kanishka 61 (73); Sajeewa Weerakoon 2/38 (9 overs)

Saracens Sports Club won by 5 wickets
Moors Sports Club Ground, Colombo
Umpires: Asanga Jayasooriya and Deepal Gunawardene

- Moors Sports Club won the toss and elected to bat.
- Charitha Kumarasinghe (Moors Sports Club) made his List A debut.

16 March 2018
Scorecard

Panadura Sports Club; 213/9 (50 overs)	v	Sri Lanka Ports Authority Cricket Club; 191 (43.3 overs)
Vinodh Perera 55 (71); Ramesh Nimantha 2/29 (10 overs)		Gihan Rupasinghe 54 (43); Dulanjana Seneviratne 5/64 (9.3 overs)

Panadura Sports Club won by 22 runs
Panadura Esplanade, Panadura
Umpires: Kapil Kottahachchi and Kamal Indrajith

- Sri Lanka Ports Authority Cricket Club won the toss and elected to field.
- Vishva Chathuranga, Sakuranga Fonseka, C Bandara, Sameendra Madushan and Dulanjana Seneviratne (Panadura Sports Club) all made their List A debuts.

18 March 2018
Scorecard

Kurunegala Youth Cricket Club; 181 (48.4 overs)	v	Moors Sports Club; 182/7 (30.2 overs)
Tharinda Wijesinghe 50 (88); Chanuk Dilshan 5/27 (9 overs)		Chamara Silva 45 (22); Kalhan Sineth 2/24 (9 overs)

Moors Sports Club won by 3 wickets
Welagedara Stadium, Kurunegala
Umpires: Mohan de Silva and Keerthi Bandara

- Kurunegala Youth Cricket Club won the toss and elected to bat.
- Prabhash Keppitipola and Danuka Prabath (Kurunegala Youth Cricket Club) both made their List A debuts.

18 March 2018
Scorecard

Panadura Sports Club; 176 (46.4 overs)	v	Sinhalese Sports Club; 178/2 (33.2 overs)
Aravinda Premaratne 35 (63); Jeffrey Vandersay 4/37 (10 overs)		Kaushal Silva 100* (108); Vinodh Perera 1/31 (4.2 overs)

Sinhalese Sports Club won by 8 wickets
Panadura Esplanade, Panadura
Umpires: Kitsiri Jayaweera and Deepal Gunawardene

- Sinhalese Sports Club won the toss and elected to field.

18 March 2018
Scorecard

Saracens Sports Club; 272/6 (50 overs)	v	Sri Lanka Ports Authority Cricket Club; 141 (36.5 overs)
Ruvindu Gunasekera 111 (118); Charith Jayampathi 3/48 (7 overs)		Ranesh Perera 35 (52); Sachithra Perera 3/36 (10 overs)

Saracens Sports Club won by 131 runs
FTZ Sports Complex, Katunayake
Umpires: Upul Wewage and Gamini Dissanayake

- Saracens Sports Club won the toss and elected to bat.
- Chathura Milan, Malinga De Silva and Nalin Priyadarshana (Sri Lanka Ports Authority Cricket Club) all made their List A debuts.

==== Group B ====
10 March 2018
Scorecard

Chilaw Marians Cricket Club; 318/8 (50 overs)	v	Galle Cricket Club; 135/5 (34 overs)
Shehan Jayasuriya 161 (139); Mahesh Sanjeewa 4/58 (9 overs)		Harsha Rajapaksha 56 (60); Sachithra Serasinghe 2/21 (6 overs)

Chilaw Marians Cricket Club won by 97 runs (D/L method)
FTZ Sports Complex, Katunayake
Umpires: Nilan De Silva and Jayantha de Silva

- Chilaw Marians Cricket Club won the toss and elected to bat.
- Nilanka Rukshitha and Mahesh Sanjeewa (Galle Cricket Club) both made their List A debuts.

10 March 2018
Scorecard

Sri Lanka Army Sports Club; 237/9 (50 overs)	v	Colts Cricket Club; 240/8 (48.5 overs)
Dilshan de Soysa 57 (92); Nisala Tharaka 3/60 (10 overs)		Sadeera Samarawickrama 124* (135); Janith Silva 2/36 (7 overs)

Colts Cricket Club won by 2 wickets
Army Ground, Panagoda
Umpires: Dilshan de Silva and Vidura Prasad

- Colts Cricket Club won the toss and elected to field.
- Yasoda Mendis (Sri Lanka Army Sports Club) and Kavishka Anjula (Colts Cricket Club) both made their List A debuts.

12 March 2018
Scorecard

Colts Cricket Club; 101/6 (22 overs)	v	Chilaw Marians Cricket Club; 66/3 (8 overs)
Avishka Fernando 27 (23); Malinda Pushpakumara 3/12 (4 overs)		Shehan Jayasuriya 40* (26); Nuwan Kulasekara 1/8 (2 overs)

No result
Colts Cricket Club Ground, Colombo
Umpires: Krishantha Rodrigo and Maurice Zilva

- Colts Cricket Club won the toss and elected to bat.
- Dilshan Gunawardene (Chilaw Marians Cricket Club) made his List A debut.

12 March 2018
Scorecard

Lankan Cricket Club; 98 (21.5 overs)	v	Sri Lanka Army Sports Club; 99/5 (16.4 overs)
Navin Kavikara 19 (24); Ruchira Tharindra 5/14 (4.5 overs)		Dilshan de Soysa 34* (37); Navin Kavikara 3/22 (4 overs)

Sri Lanka Army Sports Club won by 5 wickets
Army Ground, Panagoda
Umpires: Jayantha de Silva and Kapil Kottahachchi

- Dinushka Malan, Rajitha Ranaweera (Lankan Cricket Club) and Buddika Madushanka (Sri Lanka Army Sports Club) all made their List A debuts.

14 March 2018
Scorecard

Chilaw Marians Cricket Club; 255/9 (50 overs)	v	Lankan Cricket Club; 201 (45.1 overs)
Oshada Fernando 52 (66); Navin Kavikara 3/37 (10 overs)		Yashan Samarasinghe 63 (85); Asitha Fernando 4/39 (10 overs)

Chilaw Marians Cricket Club won by 54 runs
FTZ Sports Complex, Katunayake

- Chilaw Marians Cricket Club won the toss and elected to bat.

14 March 2018
Scorecard

Colts Cricket Club; 300/7 (50 overs)	v	Galle Cricket Club; 164 (45.2 overs)
Priyamal Perera 102* (68); Gayan Sirisoma 3/60 (10 overs)		Harsha Rajapaksha 69 (103); Nuwan Kulasekara 4/12 (9 overs)

Colts Cricket Club won by 136 runs
Colts Cricket Club Ground, Colombo
Umpires: Prageeth Rambukwella and Mohan de Silva

- Galle Cricket Club won the toss and elected to field.
- Maheesh Theekshana (Colts Cricket Club), Ravindu Sembukuttige and Hareen Buddila (Galle Cricket Club) all made their List A debuts.

16 March 2018
Scorecard

Chilaw Marians Cricket Club; 270/8 (50 overs)	v	Sri Lanka Army Sports Club; 190 (38.1 overs)
Kasun Vidura 77 (92); Nuwan Liyanapathirana 2/24 (4 overs)		Lakshitha Madushan 38 (55); Asitha Fernando 4/14 (6.1 overs)

Chilaw Marians Cricket Club won by 80 runs
FTZ Sports Complex, Katunayake
Umpires: Upul Wewage and Prageeth Rambukwella

- Chilaw Marians Cricket Club won the toss and elected to bat.

16 March 2018
Scorecard

Galle Cricket Club	v	Lankan Cricket Club

Match abandoned
Mahinda College Ground, Galle
Umpires: Sanjeewa Fernando and Ravindra Kottahachchi

- No toss.
- No play was possible due to rain.

18 March 2018
Scorecard

Colts Cricket Club; 318/7 (50 overs)	v	Lankan Cricket Club; 133 (39.5 overs)
Hashan Dumindu 101 (124); Rajeewa Weerasinghe 3/52 (10 overs)		Navin Kavikara 26 (37); Dilruwan Perera 3/11 (8 overs)

Colts Cricket Club won by 185 runs
Colts Cricket Club Ground, Colombo
Umpires: Saman Mohan de Silva and Ravindra Kottahachchi

- Colts Cricket Club won the toss and elected to bat.
- Sajana de Silva and Poorna Charuka (Lankan Cricket Club) both made their List A debuts.

18 March 2018
Scorecard

Sri Lanka Army Sports Club; 185 (47.2 overs)	v	Galle Cricket Club; 133 (34.1 overs)
Leo Fransisco 48 (70); Gayan Sirisoma 4/45 (10 overs)		Harsha Rajapaksha 42 (58); Dilshan de Soysa 5/33 (8 overs)

Sri Lanka Army Sports Club won by 52 runs
Army Ground, Panagoda
Umpires: Krishantha Rodrigo and Pradeep Udawatta

- Sri Lanka Army won the toss and elected to bat.
- Pawan Dias and Dilshan Kanchana (Galle Cricket Club) both made their List A debuts.

==== Group C ====
10 March 2018
Scorecard

Colombo Cricket Club; 222/8 (50 overs)	v	Burgher Recreation Club; 51/5 (14 overs)
Madawa Warnapura 56 (88); Chamikara Edirisinghe 3/38 (10 overs)		Pravinath Wijesooriya 17* (28); Lahiru Gamage 2/14 (3 overs)

No result
Colombo Cricket Club Ground, Colombo
Umpires: Ravindra Kottahachchi and Nilantha Semasinghe

- Burgher Recreation Club won the toss and elected to field.
- Shashin Dilranga, Pravinath Wijesooriya, Himesh Ramanayake (Burgher Recreation Club) and Nuwan Thushara (Colombo Cricket Club) all made their List A debuts.

10 March 2018
Scorecard

Nondescripts Cricket Club; 326/5 (50 overs)	v	Badureliya Sports Club; 139/7 (29 overs)
Mahela Udawatte 117 (117); Sachin Fernando 2/66 (10 overs)		Ramindu de Silva 51* (54); Chaturanga de Silva 3/20 (6 overs)

Nondescripts Cricket Club won by 83 runs (D/L method)
Nondescripts Cricket Club Ground, Colombo
Umpires: Sisira Kumara Perera and Susantha Dissanayake

- Badureliya Sports Club won the toss and elected to field.
- Sachintha Peiris (Nondescripts Cricket Club), Sachin Fernando and Anjana De Silva (Badureliya Sports Club) all made their List A debuts.

10 March 2018
Scorecard

Sri Lanka Air Force Sports Club; 204 (49.3 overs)	v	Sri Lanka Police Sports Club; 101/5 (12.1 overs)
SL Fernando 50 (54); Mahesh Priyadarshana 3/38 (8 overs)		Samith Dushantha 25 (20); Shohan Rangika 2/19 (2.2 overs)

No result
Police Park, Colombo
Umpires: Upul Wewage and Rohitha Kottahachchi

- Police Sports Club won the toss and elected to field.
- Nimesh Vimukthi, Kasun Caldera (Sri Lanka Police Sports Club), Lahiru Kumara, Chaamikara Hewage, Dilip Tharaka, SL Fernando and Christoper Denipitiya (Sri Lanka Air Force Sports Club) all made their List A debuts.

12 March 2018
Scorecard

Colombo Cricket Club; 169 (24.5 overs)	v	Sri Lanka Police Sports Club; 87 (20.1 overs)
Wanindu Hasaranga 40 (39); Hasitha Lakmal de Silva 3/2 (0.5 overs)		Manjula Jayawardene 29 (24); Ashan Priyanjan 3/18 (5 overs)

Colombo Cricket Club won by 82 runs
Colombo Cricket Club Ground, Colombo
Umpires: Rohitha Kottahachchi and Sisira Kumara Perera

- Police Sports Club won the toss and elected to field.
- Kaveen Bandara (Colombo Cricket Club), Nishantha Kumara, Hasitha Lakmal de Silva and Chamod Piumal (Sri Lanka Police Sports Club) all made their List A debuts.

12 March 2018
Scorecard

Burgher Recreation Club; 121/5 (21 overs)	v	Nondescripts Cricket Club
Rumesh Buddika 50* (53); Farveez Maharoof 2/12 (5 overs)

No result
Nondescripts Cricket Club Ground, Colombo
Umpires: Upul Wewage and Gamini Dissanayake

- Nondescripts Cricket Club won the toss and elected to field.

12 March 2018
Scorecard

Sri Lanka Air Force Sports Club; 263/8 (50 overs)	v	Badureliya Sports Club; 267/8 (49.5 overs)
SL Fernando 75 (91); Alankara Asanka Silva 2/47 (10 overs)		Pathum Nissanka 58 (87); Shohan Rangika 2/53 (10 overs)

Badureliya Sports Club won by 2 wickets
Air Force Ground, Katunayake
Umpires: Vidura Prasad and Kitsiri Jayaweera

- Sri Lanka Air Force Sports Club won the toss and elected to bat.
- Chandula Weeraratne (Badureliya Sports Club) made his List A debut.

14 March 2018
Scorecard

Burgher Recreation Club; 168 (41 overs)	v	Sri Lanka Air Force Sports Club; 127 (34.1 overs)
Deshan Dias 38 (73); Dilip Tharaka 4/31 (8 overs)		SL Fernando 39 (73); Tillakaratne Sampath 4/37 (9 overs)

Burgher Recreation Club won by 41 runs
Burgher Recreation Club Ground, Colombo
Umpires: Jayantha de Silva and Kapil Kottahachchi

- Sri Lanka Air Force Sports Club won the toss and elected to field.
- Hashan Harshana James (Sri Lanka Air Force Sports Club) made his List A debut.

14 March 2018
Scorecard

Colombo Cricket Club; 181 (46.1 overs)	v	Nondescripts Cricket Club; 183/3 (26.1 overs)
Kaveen Bandara 77 (101); Lasith Malinga 4/24 (8 overs)		Mahela Udawatte 53* (62); Lakshan Sandakan 1/22 (5 overs)

Nondescripts Cricket Club won by 7 wickets
Colombo Cricket Club Ground, Colombo
Umpires: Kamal Indrajith and Pradeep Udawatta

- Nondescripts Cricket Club won the toss and elected to field.

14 March 2018
Scorecard

Sri Lanka Police Sports Club; 224 (49.5 overs)	v	Badureliya Sports Club; 192 (47.5 overs)
Srimantha Wijeratne 54 (66); Saranga Rajaguru 5/50 (9.5 overs)		Nadeera Nawela 44 (66); Mahesh Priyadarshana 4/45 (9.5 overs)

Police Sports Club won by 32 runs
Police Park, Colombo
Umpires: Chaminda Hathurusingha and Gamini Dissanayake

- Badureliya Sports Club won the toss and elected to field.
- Sachitha Jayathilake (Sri Lanka Police Sports Club) and Yomesh Ranasinghe (Badureliya Sports Club) both made their List A debuts.

16 March 2018
Scorecard

Badureliya Sports Club; 216/9 (50 overs)	v	Burgher Recreation Club; 217/3 (37.1 overs)
Pathum Nissanka 50 (77); Himesh Ramanayake 3/52 (10 overs)		Lisula Lakshan 107 (104); Saranga Rajaguru 2/37 (5.1 overs)

Burgher Recreation Club won by 7 wickets
Burgher Recreation Club Ground, Colombo

- Burgher Recreation Club won the toss and elected to field.

16 March 2018
Scorecard

Nondescripts Cricket Club; 291/8 (50 overs)	v	Sri Lanka Police Sports Club; 111 (23.4 overs)
Mahela Udawatte 109 (116); Mahesh Priyadarshana 4/64 (10 overs)		Sachitha Jayathilake 36 (41); Lahiru Kumara 4/24 (7 overs)

Nondescripts Cricket Club won by 180 runs
Nondescripts Cricket Club Ground, Colombo
Umpires: Vidura Prasad and Maurice Zilva

- Nondescripts Cricket Club won the toss and elected to bat.

16 March 2018
Scorecard

Colombo Cricket Club; 176 (45.3 overs)	v	Sri Lanka Air Force Sports Club; 180/9 (41.4 overs)
Wanindu Hasaranga 53 (68); Shohan Rangika 5/23 (8.3 overs)		Shohan Rangika 41* (28); Wanindu Hasaranga 5/21 (10 overs)

Sri Lanka Air Force Sports Club won by 1 wicket
Air Force Ground, Katunayake
Umpires: Saman Mohan de Silva and Anton Mattau

- Sri Lanka Air Force Sports Club won the toss and elected to field.

17 March 2018
Scorecard

Colombo Cricket Club; 306/8 (50 overs)	v	Badureliya Sports Club; 156 (37.2 overs)
Ron Chandraguptha 96 (85); Dilesh Gunaratne 5/50 (10 overs)		Dilhan Cooray 76 (76); Lakshan Sandakan 3/41 (9.2 overs)

Colombo Cricket Club won by 150 runs
Colombo Cricket Club Ground, Colombo
Umpires: Sisira Kumara Perera and Gamini Dissanayake

- Badureliya Sports Club won the toss and elected to field.

18 March 2018
Scorecard

Burgher Recreation Club; 258/9 (50 overs)	v	Sri Lanka Police Sports Club; 226 (45.3 overs)
Suraj Randiv 53* (49); Mahesh Priyadarshana 3/59 (10 overs)		Hasitha Nirmal 64 (82); Suraj Randiv 4/38 (7.3 overs)

Burgher Recreation Club won by 32 runs
Police Park, Colombo
Umpires: R P Massalage and Rohitha Kottahachchi

- Burgher Recreation Club won the toss and elected to bat.
- Umeshka Morais (Sri Lanka Police Sports Club) made his List A debut.

18 March 2018
Scorecard

Nondescripts Cricket Club; 210 (46.1 overs)	v	Sri Lanka Air Force Sports Club; 68 (19.3 overs)
Chaturanga de Silva 101 (116); SL Fernando 3/35 (8 overs)		SL Fernando 19 (19); Sachintha Peiris 6/36 (9.3 overs)

Nondescripts Cricket Club won by 142 runs
Air Force Ground, Katunayake
Umpires: Ranjith Vishwakula and Eric Kannangara

- Sri Lanka Air Force Sports Club won the toss and elected to field.
- Sachika Udara (Sri Lanka Air Force Sports Club) made his List A debut.

==== Group D ====
10 March 2018
Scorecard

Bloomfield Cricket and Athletic Club; 240/9 (50 overs)	v	Negombo Cricket Club; 108/6 (15 overs)
Nisal Francisco 69 (110); Sewvinda Silva 5/51 (9 overs)		Lasith Croospulle 31* (21); Malith de Silva 2/26 (4 overs)

No result
Bloomfield Cricket and Athletic Club Ground, Colombo
Umpires: Krishantha Rodrigo and Kapil Kottahachchi

- Negombo Cricket Club won the toss and elected to field.
- Dilasri Lokubandara, Prasansana Jayamanna, Lasith Croospulle, Sehan Weerasinghe, Roshen Fernando and Sewvinda Silva (Negombo Cricket Club) all made their List A debuts.

10 March 2018
Scorecard

Tamil Union Cricket and Athletic Club; 200 (48.5 overs)	v	Kalutara Town Club; 64/5 (11.5 overs)
Tharanga Paranavitana 78 (118); Nipuna Kariyawasam 6/33 (8.5 overs)		Matheesha Perera 38 (35); Dulanjana Mendis 3/19 (2.5 overs)

No result
P Sara Oval, Colombo
Umpires: Maurice Zilva and Ranganath Prasanna

- Kalutara Town Club won the toss and elected to field.
- M Nimesh (Kalutara Town Club) made his List A debut.

11 March 2018
Scorecard

Sri Lanka Navy Sports Club; 185 (45 overs)	v	Ragama Cricket Club; 191/2 (26.5 overs)
Kusal Edussooriya 37 (61)		Lahiru Milantha 88 (65)

Ragama Cricket Club won by 8 wickets
Moors Sports Club Ground, Colombo
Umpires: Kapil Kottahachchi and Mohan de Silva

- Sri Lanka Navy Sports Club won the toss and elected to bat.
- Nishan Peiris (Ragama Cricket Club), Suraj Weerasinghe, Thushara Madushanka, Buddika Madushan and Nuwan Sampath (Sri Lanka Navy Sports Club) all made their List A debuts.

12 March 2018
Scorecard

Bloomfield Cricket and Athletic Club; 156/7 (25 overs)	v	Kalutara Town Club; 67/8 (12.4 overs)
Lahiru Jayakody 40 (32); Nipuna Kariyawasam 3/27 (4 overs)		Eranga Rathnayake 26 (28); Ramesh Mendis 2/8 (2 overs)

No result
Bloomfield Cricket and Athletic Club Ground, Colombo
Umpires: Nilan De Silva and Nilantha Semasinghe

- Kalutara Town Club won the toss and elected to field.
- Ravindu Tillakaratne (Kalutara Town Club) made his List A debut.

12 March 2018
Scorecard

Negombo Cricket Club; 233 (49.3 overs)	v	Ragama Cricket Club; 234/8 (49.2 overs)
Akeel Inham 89 (127); Sahan Nanayakkare 3/31 (10 overs)		Lahiru Milantha 81 (89); Sewvinda Silva 2/37 (10 overs)

Ragama Cricket Club won by 2 wickets
Kadirana Cricket Grounds, Gampaha
Umpires: Ravindra Kottahachchi and Eric Kannangara

- Ragama Cricket Club won the toss and elected to field.

12 March 2018
Scorecard

Tamil Union Cricket and Athletic Club; 262/8 (46 overs)	v	Sri Lanka Navy Sports Club; 161 (34 overs)
Tharanga Paranavitana 118 (120); Kusal Edussooriya 2/34 (10 overs)		Buddika Hasaranga 36 (41); Dinuk Wikramanayaka 3/43 (8 overs)

Tamil Union Cricket and Athletic Club won by 89 runs (D/L method)
Navy Ground, Welisara
Umpires: Pradeep Udawatta and Prageeth Rambukwella

- Sri Lanka Navy Sports Club won the toss and elected to field.
- Tharushan Iddamalgoda, Mohammed Alfar (Sri Lanka Navy Sports Club) and Ravindu Kodituwakku (Tamil Union Cricket and Athletic Club) all made their List A debuts.

14 March 2018
Scorecard

Sri Lanka Navy Sports Club; 92 (23.1 overs)	v	Bloomfield Cricket and Athletic Club; 96/1 (17.5 overs)
Savin Gunasekara 20* (27); Malith de Silva 4/20 (7 overs)		Adeesha Nanayakkara 51 (45)

Bloomfield Cricket and Athletic Club won by 9 wickets
Bloomfield Cricket and Athletic Club Ground, Colombo
Umpires: Vidura Prasad and Nilan De Silva

- Bloomfield Cricket and Athletic Club won the toss and elected to field.
- Savin Gunasekara, Isuru Waduge and Amila Madusanka (Sri Lanka Navy Sports Club) all made their List A debuts.

14 March 2018
Scorecard

Negombo Cricket Club; 196/8 (50 overs)	v	Kalutara Town Club; 199/6 (42 overs)
Lasith Croospulle 59* (72); Matheesha Perera 3/27 (10 overs)		Geeth Perera 65 (114); Roshen Fernando 3/40 (9 overs)

Kalutara Town Club won by 4 wickets
Surrey Village, Maggona
Umpires: Susantha Dissanayake and Eric Kannangara

- Kalutara Town Club won the toss and elected to field.
- Avishka Fernando (Negombo Cricket Club) made his List A debut.

14 March 2018
Scorecard

Tamil Union Cricket and Athletic Club; 260/7 (42 overs)	v	Ragama Cricket Club; 261/4 (40 overs)
Tharanga Paranavitana 72 (85); Sahan Nanayakkare 2/17 (4 overs)		Lahiru Milantha 112 (97); Binura Fernando 1/48 (7 overs)

Ragama Cricket Club won by 6 wickets
P Sara Oval, Colombo
Umpires: Upul Wewage and Hemantha Boteju

- Ragama Cricket Club won the toss and elected to field.
- Saminda Fernando (Ragama Cricket Club) made his List A debut.

16 March 2018
Scorecard

Kalutara Town Club; 193 (49.5 overs)	v	Sri Lanka Navy Sports Club; 197/5 (47.5 overs)
Devind Pathmanathan 46 (71); Nuwan Sampath 4/32 (8 overs)		Tharushan Iddamalgoda 58 (77); Lakshan Jayasinghe 2/33 (10 overs)

Sri Lanka Navy Sports Club won by 5 wickets
Navy Ground, Welisara
Umpires: Sagara Kumara and Kitsiri Jayaweera

- Kalutara Town Club won the toss and elected to bat.
- Chenutha Wickramasinghe (Sri Lanka Navy Sports Club) made his List A debut.

16 March 2018
Scorecard

Negombo Cricket Club; 156 (46.3 overs)	v	Tamil Union Cricket and Athletic Club; 159/2 (20.1 overs)
Dilasri Lokubandara 42 (61); Pramod Madushan 3/26 (9 overs)		Ramith Rambukwella 102 (55); Ravindra Karunaratne 1/28 (5 overs)

Tamil Union Cricket and Athletic Club won by 8 wickets
Kadirana Cricket Grounds, Gampaha
Umpires: Nilantha Semasinghe and Chaminda Handunnettige

- Negombo Cricket Club won the toss and elected to bat.
- Sachin Dalpethado and Channa Fernando (Negombo Cricket Club) both made their List A debuts.

16 March 2018
Scorecard

Bloomfield Cricket and Athletic Club; 260/8 (50 overs)	v	Ragama Cricket Club; 248 (48.5 overs)
Adeesha Nanayakkara 131 (124); Ishan Jayaratne 3/60 (10 overs)		Lahiru Milantha 56 (69); Malith de Silva 2/33 (10 overs)

Bloomfield Cricket and Athletic Club won by 12 runs
Bloomfield Cricket and Athletic Club Ground, Colombo
Umpires: Jayantha de Silva and Nilantha Bopage

- Bloomfield Cricket and Athletic Club won the toss and elected to bat.

18 March 2018
Scorecard

Bloomfield Cricket and Athletic Club; 242/8 (50 overs)	v	Tamil Union Cricket and Athletic Club; 244/8 (47.2 overs)
Adeesha Nanayakkara 106 (127); Pramod Madushan 3/60 (10 overs)		Dhananjaya de Silva 122 (110); Ramesh Mendis 4/35 (9 overs)

Tamil Union Cricket and Athletic Club won by 2 wickets
Bloomfield Cricket and Athletic Club Ground, Colombo
Umpires: Prageeth Rambukwella and Kamal Indrajith

- Tamil Union Cricket and Athletic Club won the toss and elected to field.

18 March 2018
Scorecard

Ragama Cricket Club; 272/5 (50 overs)	v	Kalutara Town Club; 153 (40 overs)
Lahiru Thirimanne 74 (66); Shanaka Sampath 3/54 (10 overs)		Pasindu Madushan 56* (63); Sahan Nanayakkare 4/45 (10 overs)

Ragama Cricket Club won by 119 runs
Thurstan College Ground, Colombo
Umpires: Nilan De Silva and Nilantha Semasinghe

- Kalutara Town Club won the toss and elected to field.
- Rusiru Jayasiri, Dinesh Indika and Shanaka Sampath (Kalutara Town Club) all made their List A debuts.

18 March 2018
Scorecard

Negombo Cricket Club; 195 (49.4 overs)	v	Sri Lanka Navy Sports Club; 199/2 (32.5 overs)
Prasansana Jayamanna 43 (68); Sudara Dakshina 5/28 (10 overs)		Tharushan Iddamalgoda 70 (65); Sewvinda Silva 1/22 (5 overs)

Sri Lanka Navy Sports Club won by 8 wickets
Navy Ground, Welisara
Umpires: Hemantha Boteju and Ranganath Prasanna

- Sri Lanka Navy Sports Club won the toss and elected to field.
- Sudara Dakshina (Sri Lanka Navy Sports Club), Sandaruwan Rodrigo and HUD Fernando (Negombo Cricket Club) all made their List A debuts.

=== Knockout stage ===
==== Quarterfinals ====
1st Quarterfinal
21 March 2018
Scorecard

Tamil Union Cricket and Athletic Club; 113 (40.3 overs)	v	Saracens Sports Club; 114/6 (29.3 overs)
Tharanga Paranavitana 47 (87); Chathura Randunu 6/30 (8.3 overs)		Thanuka Dabare 26 (31); Binura Fernando 3/19 (7 overs)

Saracens Sports Club won by 4 wickets
Sinhalese Sports Club Ground, Colombo
Umpires: Pradeep Udawatta and Asanga Jayasooriya

- Saracens Sports Club won the toss and elected to field.

2nd Quarterfinal
21 March 2018
Scorecard

Chilaw Marians Cricket Club; 256 (49.4 overs)	v	Burgher Recreation Club; 226 (46.2 overs)
Shehan Jayasuriya 84 (83); Chamikara Edirisinghe 2/46 (10 overs)		Deshan Dias 60 (70); Dilshan Gunawardene 3/35 (7 overs)

Chilaw Marians Cricket Club won by 30 runs
P Sara Oval, Colombo
Umpires: Ranganath Prasanna and Gamini Dissanayake

- Burgher Recreation Club won the toss and elected to field.

3rd Quarterfinal
21 March 2018
Scorecard

Colts Cricket Club; 218 (49.1 overs)	v	Nondescripts Cricket Club; 220/5 (36.4 overs)
Nisala Tharaka 83 (100); Dushmantha Chameera 5/51 (10 overs)		Angelo Perera 74* (78); Akila Dananjaya 2/34 (8 overs)

Nondescripts Cricket Club won by 5 wickets
FTZ Sports Complex, Katunayake
Umpires: Susantha Dissanayake and Hemantha Boteju

- Nondescripts Cricket Club won the toss and elected to field.

4th Quarterfinal
21 March 2018
Scorecard

Ragama Cricket Club; 206 (48 overs)	v	Sinhalese Sports Club; 207/2 (36.5 overs)
Lahiru Milantha 48 (65); Sachithra Senanayake 4/25 (10 overs)		Dimuth Karunaratne 70* (86); Lahiru Milantha 2/43 (10 overs)

Sinhalese Sports Club won by 8 wickets
Colts Cricket Club Ground, Colombo
Umpires: Nilan De Silva and Rohitha Kottahachchi

- Ragama Cricket Club won the toss and elected to bat.

==== Finals ====
1st Semi-final
23 March 2018
Scorecard

Nondescripts Cricket Club; 327/5 (50 overs)	v	Saracens Sports Club; 238 (43.3 overs)
Niroshan Dickwella 110 (132); Chathura Randunu 2/65 (10 overs)		Ashen Bandara 51 (69); Farveez Maharoof 2/36 (8 overs)

Nondescripts Cricket Club won by 89 runs
Colts Cricket Club Ground, Colombo
Umpires: Ravindra Kottahachchi and Lyndon Hannibal

- Saracens Sports Club won the toss and elected to field.

2nd Semi-final
23 March 2018
Scorecard

Chilaw Marians Cricket Club; 138 (41.1 overs)	v	Sinhalese Sports Club; 140/2 (23.5 overs)
Oshada Fernando 43 (86); Sachithra Senanayake 2/23 (8 overs)		Danushka Gunathilaka 78* (70); Sachithra Serasinghe 1/41 (9 overs)

Sinhalese Sports Club won by 8 wickets
FTZ Sports Complex, Katunayake
Umpires: Deepal Gunawardene and Prageeth Rambukwella

- Sinhalese Sports Club won the toss and elected to field.

Final
25 March 2018
Scorecard

Nondescripts Cricket Club; 236 (48.2 overs)	v	Sinhalese Sports Club; 239/6 (45.5 overs)
Dinesh Chandimal 103 (123); Dhammika Prasad 3/42 (9.2 overs)		Danushka Gunathilaka 119 (122); Dushmantha Chameera 3/41 (10 overs)

Sinhalese Sports Club won by 4 wickets
P Sara Oval, Colombo
Umpires: Raveendra Wimalasiri and Ruchira Palliyaguruge

- Sinhalese Sports Club won the toss and elected to field.
