= Weerasinghe =

Weerasinghe is a surname. Notable people with the surname include:

- Anoja Weerasinghe (born 1955), Sri Lankan actress
- Asoka Weerasinghe, Canadian government official
- Bertram Weerasinghe (1904–1971), Ceylonese engineer and firefighter
- Chalanaka Weerasinghe (born 1994), Sri Lankan cricketer
- D. Weerasingha (born 1979), Sri Lankan politician
- Dhansiri Weerasinghe (died 2020), Sri Lankan cricketer
- Jagath Weerasinghe (born 1954), Sri Lankan contemporary artist and archeologist
- Jayantha Weerasinghe (born 1950), Sri Lankan politician
- L. A. Weerasinghe, Sri Lankan auditor general
- Oliver Weerasinghe (1907–1980), Sri Lankan architect and diplomat
- Rajeewa Weerasinghe (born 1987), Sri Lankan cricketer
- Rohana Weerasinghe (born 1949), Sri Lankan musician, composer and singer
- Saman Weerasinghe (born 1961), Sri Lankan physician, diplomat and businessman
- Sanjeewa Weerasinghe (born 1968), Sri Lankan cricketer
- Sehan Weerasinghe (born 1995), Sri Lankan cricketer
- Suraj Weerasinghe (born 1996), Sri Lankan cricketer
- Weerasumana Weerasinghe (born 1975), Sri Lankan politician
