= Nishant =

Nishant may refer to:

- Nishant (name), for people named Nishant, an Indian masculine given name
- Nishant (film), 1975 Indian film
- DRDO Nishant, Indian unmanned aerial vehicle

== See also ==
- Nishan (disambiguation)
- Nishantha, a Sinhalese male given name
