= Thanura =

Thanura is a given name. Notable people with the name include:

- Thanura Gunasekera (born 1996), Sri Lankan cricketer
- Thanura Gunatilleke (born 1977), Sri Lankan cricketer
- Thanura Halambage (born 1993), Sri Lankan cricketer
