= Gunatilleke =

Gunatilleke is a surname. Notable people with the surname include:

- C. V. Savitri Gunatilleke (born 1945), Sri Lankan academic
- Damith Gunatilleke (born 1983), Sri Lankan cricketer
- Kantha Gunatilleke, Sri Lankan politician
- Ranjan Gunatilleke (born 1951), Sri Lankan cricketer
- Thanura Gunatilleke (born 1977), Sri Lankan cricketer
- V. C. Gunatilleke, Sri Lankan politician
