= Nisith (given name) =

Indian male name

- Pronunciation: /nɪ.ʃɪt̪/
- Gender: Male
- Language: Sanskrit, Nepali, Hindi

Origin
- Origin: Sanskrit
- Meaning: sharp, pointed, midnight, dead of night
- Region of origin: South Asia

Other names
- Nickname: Nish
- Related names: Nishant

Niśith or Niśit is a male given name of Sanskrit origin that means "sharp, pointed, midnight and dead of night". The name Nisith appears frequently in Hindu and Buddhist scriptures, including the Mahabharata and the Sutta Pitaka.

== People ==
Individuals with the given name Nisith include:

- Nisith Pramanik, Indian politician (born 1986)
- Nisith Kumar Malik, Indian politician
- Nisith Ranjan Ray, Indian historian (1910-1994)

== See also ==
- Nishant
- Nishtha
