= Udith Fernando =

Sri Lankan cricketer (born 1996)

Personal information
- Full name: Hettiyadura Udith Dilshara Fernando
- Born: 16 November 1996 (age 29); Negombo, Sri Lanka
- Batting: Right-handed
- Bowling: Wicket-keeper
- Source: Cricinfo, 26 July 2020

Udith Fernando (born 16 November 1996) is a Sri Lankan cricketer. He made his first-class debut for Negombo Cricket Club in Tier B of the 2017–18 Premier League Tournament on 28 December 2017.
