= Nishantha =

Nishantha is a Sinhalese given name. Notable people with the given name include:

- Nishantha Fernando (cricketer) (born 1970), Sri Lankan cricketer
- Nishantha Fernando (carrom player), Sri Lankan world champion Carrom player
- Nishantha Jayaweera, Sri Lankan politician
- Nishantha Kumara (born 1985), Sri Lankan cricketer
- Nishantha Muthuhettigamage, Sri Lankan politician
- Piyal Nishantha de Silva (born 1970), Sri Lankan politician
- Nishantha Ranatunga (born 1966), Sri Lankan cricketer
- Sanath Nishantha (1975–2024), Sri Lankan politician
- Nishantha Ulugetenne, Sri Lankan naval officer
