= Nishantha Fernando =

Nishantha Fernando may refer to:

- Nishantha Fernando (cricketer) (born 1970), Sri Lankan cricketer
- Nishantha Fernando (carrom player), Sri Lankan carrom player
