= Sewvinda Silva =

Sri Lankan cricketer (born 1995)

Personal information
- Born: 17 December 1995 (age 30)
- Source: Cricinfo, 10 March 2018

Sewvinda Silva (born 17 December 1995) is a Sri Lankan cricketer. He made his Twenty20 debut for Negombo Cricket Club in the 2017–18 SLC Twenty20 Tournament on 27 February 2018. He made his List A debut for Negombo Cricket Club in the 2017–18 Premier Limited Overs Tournament on 10 March 2018.
