= Nilanka =

Nilanka is a given name. Notable people with the name include:

- Nilanka Premaratne (born 1988), Sri Lankan cricketer
- Nilanka Rukshitha (born 1998), Sri Lankan cricketer
- Nilanka Sandakan (born 1996), Sri Lankan cricketer
