= Hasitha =

Hasitha is a given name. Notable people with the name include:

- Hasitha Boyagoda (born 1998), Sri Lankan cricketer
- Hasitha Nirmal (born 1992), Sri Lankan cricketer
- Hasitha Lakmal de Silva (born 1991), Sri Lankan cricketer
