= Supun =

Supun is a Sinhalese masculine given name that may refer to the following notable Sri Lankan cricketers:

- Supun Leelaratne (born 1981)
- Supun Madushanka (born 1993)
- Supun Withanaarachchi (born 1992)
- Supun Tharanga (born 1986)
