= Sajith =

Sajith is a masculine given name of Sinhalese origin. Notable people with the name include:

- Sajith Dissanayaka (born 1989), Sri Lankan cricketer
- Sajith Fernando (born 1972), Sri Lankan first-class cricketer
- Sajith Jagadnandan (born 1981), Indian film director of movies in Malayalam
- Sajith Premadasa (born 1967) Sri Lankan politician, since 2020 Leader of the Opposition
- Sajith de Silva (born 1998), Sri Lankan cricketer
