= Dilum =

Dilum is a Sri Lankan male given name. Notable people with this name include:

- Dilum Amunugama, Sri Lankan politician
- Dilum Fernando (born 1994), Sri Lankan cricket player
- Dilum Weerarathne (born 1996), Sri Lankan cricket player
