= Srihan Anuruddhika =

Sri Lankan cricketer (born 1993)

Personal information
- Full name: Madduma Wellalage Srihan Anuruddhika
- Born: 3 March 1993 (age 33); Negombo, Sri Lanka
- Batting: Right-handed
- Bowling: Right-arm off break
- Source: Cricinfo, 26 July 2020

Srihan Anuruddhika (born 3 March 1993) is a Sri Lankan cricketer. He made his first-class debut for Negombo Cricket Club in Tier B of the 2017–18 Premier League Tournament on 21 December 2017.
