= Vibhor Yadav =

Indian cricketer (born 1991)

Personal information
- Full name: Vibhor Yadav
- Born: 28 March 1991 (age 35); Noida, India
- Batting: Right-handed
- Bowling: Right-arm medium-fast
- Source: Cricinfo, 26 July 2020

Vibhor Yadav (born 28 March 1991) is an English cricketer. He made his first-class debut for Sri Lanka Police Sports Club in Tier B of the 2017–18 Premier League Tournament on 21 December 2017.
