= Mahesh Sanjeewa =

Sri Lankan cricketer (born 1998)

Personal information
- Born: 21 March 1998 (age 28)
- Source: Cricinfo, 10 March 2018

Mahesh Sanjeewa (born 21 March 1998) is a Sri Lankan cricketer. He made his List A debut for Galle Cricket Club in the 2017–18 Premier Limited Overs Tournament on 10 March 2018.
