= Krishan Abesooriya =

Sri Lankan cricketer (born 1997)

Personal information
- Full name: Abesooriya Patabendige Krishan Rangajith
- Born: 13 May 1997 (age 29); Galle, Sri Lanka
- Batting: Left-handed
- Bowling: Slow left arm orthodox
- Source: Cricinfo, 26 July 2020

Krishan Abesooriya (born 13 May 1997) is a Sri Lankan cricketer. He made his first-class debut for Galle Cricket Club in Tier B of the 2017–18 Premier League Tournament on 5 January 2018.
