= DRDO Nishant =

Indian military UAV

Nishant
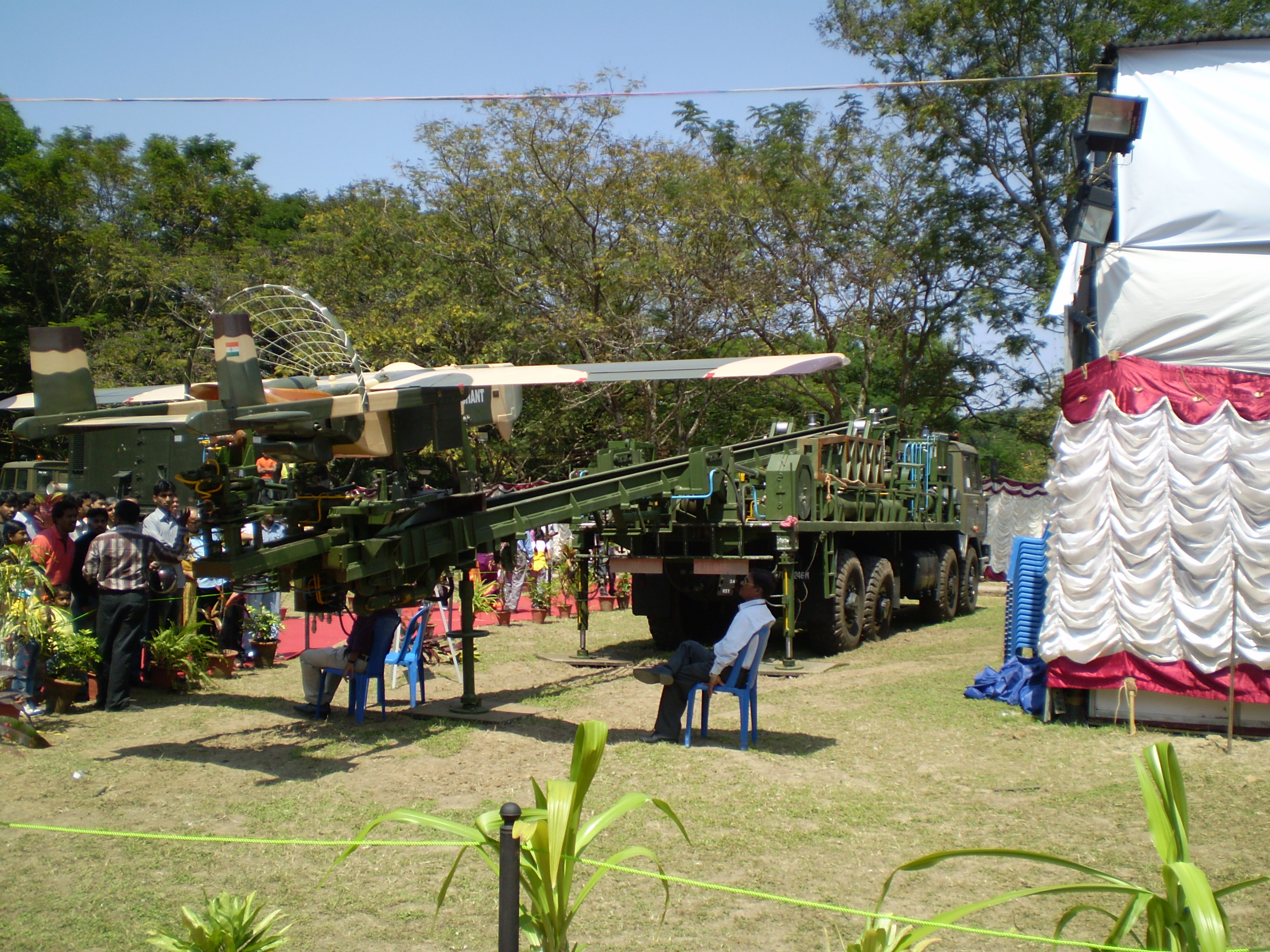
- Nishant UAV on its launcher

General information
- Type: Military UAV
- Designer: ARDE; CISR-NAL; R&DE(E)
- Status: "Abandoned project"
- Primary user: Indian Army
- Number built: Many

History
- Introduction date: 2011
- First flight: August 1996
- Retired: 2015

The DRDO Nishant (lit. 'Dawn') - is an unmanned aerial vehicle (UAV) developed by India's Aeronautical Development Establishment (ADE), a branch of Defence Research and Development Organisation (DRDO) for the Indian Armed Forces. The Nishant UAV is primarily tasked with intelligence gathering over enemy territory and also for reconnaissance, training, surveillance, target designation, artillery fire correction, damage assessment, ELINT and SIGINT. The UAV has an endurance of four hours and thirty minutes. Nishant has completed development phase and user trials. However, further development of the project was cancelled after all of the four prototypes and production UAVs crashed due to various and unknown reasons.

== Development ==
To meet the Army's operational requirement of a RPV (remotely piloted vehicle), it was decided in September 1988 that DRDO would undertake the indigenous development of the UAV. The General Staff Qualitative Requirement (GSQR) was finalised by the Army in May 1990. The Nishant RPV made its first test flight in 1995. In July 1999, for the first time the Indian army deployed its new Nishant UAV system in the fight against guerrilla forces backed by Pakistan in Kashmir Valley. Nishant, which had been developed for battlefield surveillance and reconnaissance needs of the Indian Army, was test flown again in early 2002. The indigenous Unmanned Air Vehicle (UAV) Nishant developed by ADE, DRDO had completed its 100th flight by 15 June 2002. The Indian Army had placed an order for 12 Nishant UAVs along with ground support systems by 2007. Nishant Unmanned Aerial Vehicle (UAV) developed by DRDO for Indian Army was successfully flight tested near Kolar on 20 June 2008. Nishant has completed development phase and user trials. The present flight tests are pre confirmatory trials before induction into services.

=== Test flight with Wankel engine ===
On Sunday 5 April 2009, DRDO launched a test flight of the Nishant UAV. The main goal was to test the performance of the indigenous Wankel engine used on the UAV. An abandoned World War II runway at a village near Kolar played host to the first ever flight of this rotary engine-powered UAV. The flight took off on early Sunday morning and climbed to an altitude of 1.8 km (5,900 ft) before cruising for a duration of 35 minutes. The air vehicle was recovered safely at the intended place at a dried-up lake, after a total flight duration of 40 min. The engine, a Wankel rotary type, was jointly designed and developed by National Aerospace Laboratories (NAL), Vehicle Research and Development Establishment (VRDE) and Aeronautical Development Establishment (ADE). The provisional flight clearance for the first indigenous prototype engine was given by the certifying agency, the Regional Centre for Military Airworthiness and Certification. The engine was cleared for flight after rigorous ground endurance test runs. The Wankel engine weighs about 25 kg (70 lb), and this engine type is known for its high power-to-weight ratio in a single rotor category.

DRDO was satisfied with the test results. The performance of the engine during the flight met the requirements of the first flight of an engine in the air vehicle. This 55 hp indigenous engine is expected to replace the present imported engine of Nishant. The critical core engine, including the special cylinder composite nickel–silicon carbide coating and special aluminium alloy castings, was designed and developed by NAL. VRDE developed engine peripherals such as the ignition and fuel systems and ADE developed flight testing. The reconnaissance UAV, which has completed its user trials with the Indian Army, is expected to be handed over to the army shortly.

=== User trials and induction ===
Nishant UAV again underwent crucial confirmatory user trials at Pokhran in April 2010. The trials began April 20 and were supposed to last for one week. A senior Army official at Pokhran said the trials are moving forward in a very satisfactory manner. “We are checking three crucial parameters: video quality, tracking ability and fall of gunshot [missed distance after firing]. These input performances are critical to our operations in the forward areas,” the official said. DRDO has delivered the first four UAVs to the Indian Army at a cost of ₹800 million (equivalent to ₹1.8 billion or US$19 million in 2023)800 million ₹ ($17.9 million).

According to The Times Of India, two UAVs crash-landed in Jaisalmer district near the India-Pakistan border due to change in wind direction on April 28 and April 30. Confirming the news, a DRDO official said, "The user trials were going on and during the flight there were some technical snags owing to which the craft was landed using parachutes." He said, "But the landing was done safely and no one was hurt in the process. Though before our officials could reach to get the craft back, villagers damaged the aircraft and took away some equipment."

On 3 February 2011 Nishant UAV successfully completed confirmatory trials conducted by the Indian Army at Pokhran, Rajasthan.

By 2011, four UAVs were delivered after long delays as part of the first phase of development.

On 4 and 19 November 2015, the last two of the four Nishant UAV crashed in Pokhran, Rajasthan while earlier in April the same year, the other two Nishant UAVs crashed near Jaisalmer. The Nishant programme, costing a total of ₹90 crore (equivalent to ₹120 crore or US$13 million in 2023), had been closed. The second phase as a part of which 8 UAVs and 2 ground systems were to be delivered was called off. The crashes were speculated due to technical issues in its recovery phase. The unit cost of the aircraft was ₹22 crore (equivalent to ₹29 crore or US$3.1 million in 2023).

=== Panchi UAV ===
A wheeled version of the Nishant UAV, named Panchi (Bird) underwent taxi trails in September 2014. The UAV is capable of operating from semi-prepared runway, thereby reducing the turnaround time between missions, which is major advantage over the current catapult launched Nishant. Panchi has successfully completed 5 flights proving the concept of conventional take-off and landing. Data for aerodynamic, structure integrity and Flight control studies have been generated and analysed.

== Design (Nishant UAV) ==
The 380 kg (840 lb) Nishant UAV requires rail-launching from a hydro-pneumatic launcher and is able to be recovered by a parachute system. Launches at a velocity of 45 m/s are carried out in 0.6 second with 100 kW power and subsequent launches can be carried out in intervals of 20 minutes. The Mobile Hydro-Pneumatic Launcher (MHPL) system mounted on a Tatra truck weighs 14,000 kg (31,000 lb) and boasts of a life cycle of 1000 launches before requiring overhaul. Nishant is one of the few UAVs in the world in its weight-class capable of being catapult-launched and recovered by using parachute, thus eliminating the need for a runway as in case of conventional take-off and landing with wheels.

=== Features ===
- Day/night capability training vehicle
- Battlefield reconnaissance & surveillance,
- Target tracking and localization
- Artillery fire correction
- All terrain mobility
- Target designation (using integral laser target designator)
- Endurance: 4 h 30 min

== Ground support systems ==
- Ground control station (GCS)
- Antenna vehicle/Ground Data Terminal (GDT)
- Avionics preparation vehicle (APV)
- Mechanical maintenance vehicle
- UAV transportation vehicle
- Power supply vehicle

=== Launch & recovery ===
- Launch: Mobile hydropneumatic launcher (MHPL) system designed by R&DE(E) (3 built)
- Recovery: Parachute + landing bags

== Former operators ==
India

- Indian Army

== Specifications ==
Data from Rediff, Jane's Defence Weekly and Aviation Week

General characteristics

- Length: 4.6 m (15 ft 1 in)
- Wingspan: 6.5 m (21 ft 4 in)
- Gross weight: 350–380 kg (772–838 lb)
- Powerplant: 1 × ALVIS AR-801 , 41 kW (55 hp)
- Propellers: 2-bladed fixed-pitch pusher propeller

Performance

- Maximum speed: 216 km/h (134 mph, 117 kn)
- Range: 100 km (62 mi, 54 nmi)
- Endurance: 4.5 hours
- Service ceiling: 3,962 m (12,999 ft)

Avionics
45 kg (99 lb) electro-optical, infrared or laser sensors

== See also ==
- DRDO Lakshya
- DRDO Rustom
- DRDO AURA

Aircraft of comparable role, configuration, and era

- SAGEM Sperwer
- RQ-15 Neptune
- SAGEM Crecerelle
- Chung Shyang II UAV
