= Dulanjana Seneviratne =

Sri Lankan cricketer (born 1996)

Personal information
- Born: 13 May 1996 (age 30); Colombo, Sri Lanka
- Source: Cricinfo, 14 March 2017

Dulanjana Seneviratne (born 13 May 1996) is a Sri Lankan cricketer. He made his first-class debut for Colombo Cricket Club in the 2015–16 Premier League Tournament on 15 January 2016. He made his Twenty20 debut for Panadura Sports Club in the 2017–18 SLC Twenty20 Tournament on 25 February 2018. He made his List A debut for Panadura Sports Club in the 2017–18 Premier Limited Overs Tournament on 16 March 2018.
