= Pubudu Hasanka =

Sri Lankan cricketer (born 1991)

Personal information
- Born: 14 August 1991 (age 35)
- Source: Cricinfo, 24 February 2018

Pubudu Hasanka (born 14 August 1991) is a Sri Lankan cricketer. He made his Twenty20 debut for Panadura Sports Club in the 2017–18 SLC Twenty20 Tournament on 24 February 2018. He made his List A debut for Panadura Sports Club in the 2017–18 Premier Limited Overs Tournament on 10 March 2018.
