= Sachin Dalpethado =

Sri Lankan cricketer (born 1996)

Personal information
- Full name: Ravindu Sachin Clarence Dalpethado
- Born: 8 February 1996 (age 30); Colombo
- Height: 5 ft 10 in (178 cm)
- Batting: Right-handed
- Bowling: Left-arm wrist spin
- Role: All-rounder

Domestic team information
- Years: Team
- 2017–2019: Negombo Cricket Club
- 2019–2021: Kalutara Town Club
- 2022–present: Burgher Recreation Club
- Source: Cricinfo, 24 February 2018

Sachin Dalpethado (born 8 February 1996) is a Sri Lankan cricketer. He made his first-class debut for Negombo Cricket Club in the 2017-18 major league three day tournament and scored his maiden first class half century against Panadura Sports Club. He made his Twenty20 debut for Negombo Cricket Club in the 2017–18 SLC Twenty20 Tournament on 24 February 2018. He made his List A debut for Negombo Cricket Club in the 2017–18 Premier Limited Overs Tournament on 16 March 2018.
