= Sandaruwan Rodrigo =

Sri Lankan cricketer (born 1997)

Personal information
- Born: 1 June 1997 (age 29)
- Source: Cricinfo, 2 March 2018

Sandaruwan Rodrigo (born 1 June 1997) is a Sri Lankan cricketer. He made his Twenty20 debut for Negombo Cricket Club in the 2017–18 SLC Twenty20 Tournament on 1 March 2018. He made his List A debut for Negombo Cricket Club in the 2017–18 Premier Limited Overs Tournament on 18 March 2018.
