= Dilasri Lokubandara =

Sri Lankan cricketer (born 1993)

Personal information
- Born: 13 August 1993 (age 33)
- Source: Cricinfo, 24 February 2018

Dilasri Lokubandara (born 13 August 1993) is a Sri Lankan cricketer. He made his Twenty20 debut for Negombo Cricket Club in the 2017–18 SLC Twenty20 Tournament on 24 February 2018. He made his List A debut for Negombo Cricket Club in the 2017–18 Premier Limited Overs Tournament on 10 March 2018.
