= Rashmika Opatha =

Sri Lankan cricketer (born 1997)

Personal information
- Full name: Lahiru Rashmika Opatha
- Born: 27 January 1997 (age 29); Colombo, Sri Lanka
- Batting: Right-handed
- Bowling: Right-arm medium-fast
- Source: Cricinfo, 26 July 2020

Rashmika Opatha (born 27 January 1997) is a Sri Lankan cricketer. He made his first-class debut for Panadura Sports Club in Tier B of the 2017–18 Premier League Tournament on 15 December 2017.
