= Rajitha Ranaweera =

Sri Lankan cricketer (born 1992)

Personal information
- Born: 7 January 1992 (age 34)
- Source: Cricinfo, 24 February 2018

Rajitha Ranaweera (born 7 January 1992) is a Sri Lankan cricketer. He made his Twenty20 debut for Lankan Cricket Club in the 2017–18 SLC Twenty20 Tournament on 24 February 2018. He made his List A debut for Lankan Cricket Club in the 2017–18 Premier Limited Overs Tournament on 12 March 2018.
