= Indeera Gallage =

Sri Lankan cricketer (born 1994)

Personal information
- Born: 30 April 1994 (age 32); Galle, Sri Lanka
- Batting: Left-handed
- Bowling: Right-arm medium
- Source: Cricinfo, 26 July 2020

Indeera Gallage (born 30 April 1994) is a Sri Lankan cricketer. He made his first-class debut for Galle Cricket Club in Tier B of the 2017–18 Premier League Tournament on 12 January 2018.
