= Nishan =

Nishan may refer to:

== People ==
- Nishan Velupillay (born 2001), Australian footballer
- Nishan Hindes, British model
- Navneet Nishan (born 1965), Indian actress
- Nishan (actor) (born 1985), Indian actor in Malayalam cinema
- The central character of the Tale of the Nishan Shaman from Manchu folklore

== Religion ==
- Nisān or nishan (singular) are particular form of Muslim gravestone characteristic for Ottoman sepulchral architecture and culture
- Nishān (Urdu: نشان; Hindi: निशान), meaning mark or stain; with this sense, it may refer to:
  - Nishaan, Ravidasi religious symbol
  - Nishan Sahib, Sikh religious symbol
  - Nishan, Hindu religious symbol such as that of Gogaji
- Surp Nshan, Armenian for "Holy Sign", may refer to churches holding an important relic, including:
  - Sourb Nshan of Sebastia
  - Church of the Holy Seal, Tbilisi, Georgia
  - Sourb Nshan, a shrine at Gargar, Armenia
  - Church of Sourb Nshan at Haghpat Monastery, Armenia
  - Surp Nshan Church at Kecharis Monastery, Armenia
  - St. Nishan Armenian Orthodox Church, Beirut
  - Kartal Surp Nişan Armenian Orthodox Church, Turkey

== Awards and decorations ==
- The first order of:
  - Civil decorations of Pakistan
  - Awards and decorations of the Pakistan military

== Media ==
- Nishan (1945 film), an Indian Hindi film
- Nishan, the Hindi version of the 1949 Tamil-language film Apoorva Sagodharargal
- Nishan (1965 film), an Indian Hindi film
- Nishan (1978 film), an Indian Bengali action drama film
- Nishaan (film), a 1983 Indian Hindi action film
- Nisaan (1986 film), a Pakistani Punjabi social film

== Other uses ==
- S.V. Nishan 42, a football club from Suriname
- Mount Ni, a hill in Shandong, China, traditionally believed to be the birthplace of Confucius
- BNS Nishan, a Durjoy-class large patrol craft of the Bangladesh Navy
- Indian Naval Ensign, also known as Nishaan, flag of the Indian Navy

== See also ==
- Nishaanchi, a 2025 Indian film
- Nisan (disambiguation)
- Nishant (disambiguation)
