= Rashindra Silva =

Sri Lankan cricketer (born 1994)

Personal information
- Full name: Sinhar Rashindra Gayashan Silva
- Born: 30 November 1994 (age 31); Panadura, Sri Lanka
- Batting: Left-handed
- Bowling: Right-arm off break
- Source: Cricinfo, 26 July 2020

Rashindra Silva (born 11 November 1994) is a Sri Lankan cricketer. He made his first-class debut for Sri Lanka Air Force Sports Club in Tier B of the 2017–18 Premier League Tournament on 16 February 2018. He made his Twenty20 debut for Galle Cricket Club in the 2019–20 SLC Twenty20 Tournament on 4 January 2020.
