= Umega Chaturanga =

Sri Lankan cricketer (born 1984)

Personal information
- Full name: Jasinthuliyana Umega Chaturanga
- Born: 3 June 1984; Galle, Sri Lanka
- Batting: Left-handed
- Bowling: Slow left-arm orthodox
- Role: Bowler

Domestic team information
- Years: Team
- 2005–2013: Galle
- 2009–2015: Moors
- 2010/11: Singha
- 2017/18: Negombo
- 2018/19: Air Force
- 2019–2023: Kandy Customs

Career statistics
| Competition | FC | LA | T20 |
|---|---|---|---|
| Matches | 59 | 38 | 14 |
| Runs scored | 689 | 156 | 23 |
| Batting average | 13.00 | 8.21 | 11.50 |
| 100s/50s | 0/2 | 0/0 | 0/0 |
| Top score | 56 | 26* | 12* |
| Balls bowled | 10,831 | 1,791 | 275 |
| Wickets | 225 | 59 | 22 |
| Bowling average | 24.68 | 18.98 | 13.50 |
| 5 wickets in innings | 15 | 1 | 0 |
| 10 wickets in match | 5 | – | – |
| Best bowling | 9/47 | 6/24 | 4/10 |
| Catches/stumpings | 21/– | 5/– | 1/– |
- Source: CricketArchive, 30 November 2022

Jasinthuliyana Umega Chaturanga (born 3 June 1984) is a Sri Lankan first-class cricketer who currently plays for Kandy Customs Sports Club. He has formerly played for the Galle, Moors, Negombo, Singha and Air Force clubs, having made his first-class debut playing for Galle in January 2006. He was born in Galle.

Chaturanga is a slow left-arm orthodox bowler who has played in 59 first-class matches to the end of the 2022–23 edition of the Major League Tournament in November 2022. He has taken 225 wickets at an average of 24.68 runs per wicket. He has taken five wickets in an innings 15 times with best figures of 9/47. He has achieved ten wickets in a match five times with a best return of 16/100. Chaturanga bats left-handed as a tail-ender. He has scored 689 first-class runs at an average of 13.00 runs per completed innings with a highest score of 56 as one of two half-centuries. Generally an outfielder, he has held 21 career catches.

== Cricket career ==
Chaturanga achieved his best bowling performance on 25–27 March 2011 when he played for Singha Sports Club against Antonians Sports Club in a Premier Trophy match at the Kadirana Cricket Ground in Gampaha. Singha won the toss and chose to bat first. They were all out for 180 and Antonians were 89/4 at close of play on the first day, Chaturanga having taken two wickets. Antonians were all out for 140 on the second morning after Chaturanga took 7/53. With a first innings lead of 40, Singha batted again and were all out after the tea break for 186, leaving Antonians with a target of 227 to win. As a tail-ender, Chaturanga had batted last in each innings, scoring 9* and 7*. At close of play on the second day, Antonians had scored 19/3, all three wickets falling to Chaturanga. On the last morning, he completed his demolition of the Antonians batting by taking six of the remaining seven wickets for a career-best return of 9/47 in 17.3 overs, a match performance of 16/100 in 39.1 overs.

Chaturanga made his Twenty20 debut for Negombo Cricket Club in the 2017–18 SLC Twenty20 Tournament on 24 February 2018.
