= Ramesh Nimantha =

Sri Lankan cricketer (born 1997)

Personal information
- Born: 25 April 1997 (age 29)
- Source: Cricinfo, 30 December 2017

Ramesh Nimantha (born 25 April 1997) is a Sri Lankan cricketer. He made his first-class debut for Sri Lanka Ports Authority Cricket Club in the 2017–18 Premier League Tournament on 28 December 2017. Prior to his first-class debut, he scored 1,000 runs in the U19 Division One League tournament in 2016, and became the leading run-scorer in the competition.

He made his List A debut for Sri Lanka Ports Authority Cricket Club in the 2017–18 Premier Limited Overs Tournament on 10 March 2018. He made his Twenty20 debut on 22 May 2022, for Bloomfield Cricket and Athletic Club in the Major Clubs T20 Tournament.
