= Chathura Samantha =

Sri Lankan cricketer (born 1987)

Personal information
- Full name: Malluwa Wadu Chathura Samantha
- Born: 9 December 1987 (age 38); Balapitiya, Sri Lanka
- Batting: Right-handed
- Bowling: Right-arm leg break
- Source: Cricinfo, 26 July 2020

Chathura Samantha (born 9 December 1987) is a Sri Lankan cricketer. He made his Twenty20 debut for Sri Lanka Air Force Sports Club in the 2014–15 AIA Premier T20 Tournament on 8 April 2015. He made his first-class debut for Sri Lanka Air Force Sports Club in Tier B of the 2017–18 Premier League Tournament on 19 January 2018.
