= Sansaka Fernando =

Sri Lankan cricketer (born 1995)

Personal information
- Born: 21 April 1995 (age 31); Anuradhapura, Sri Lanka
- Batting: Left-handed
- Bowling: Right-arm off break
- Source: ESPNcricinfo, 26 July 2020

Sansaka Fernando (born 21 April 1995) is a Sri Lankan cricketer. He made his first-class debut for Panadura Sports Club in Tier B of the 2017–18 Premier League Tournament Tier on 21 December 2017.
