= Rajith Priyan =

Sri Lankan cricketer (born 1988)

Personal information
- Born: 25 August 1988 (age 38)
- Source: Cricinfo, 25 February 2018

Rajith Priyan (born 25 August 1988) is a Sri Lankan cricketer. He made his first-class debut for Galle Cricket Club in the 2012–13 Premier Trophy on 1 February 2013.
