= Sakuranga Fonseka =

Sri Lankan cricketer (born 1993)

Personal information
- Born: 2 March 1993 (age 33)
- Source: Cricinfo, 25 February 2018

Sakuranga Fonseka (born 2 March 1993) is a Sri Lankan cricketer. He made his Twenty20 debut for Panadura Sports Club in the 2017–18 SLC Twenty20 Tournament on 25 February 2018. He made his List A debut for Panadura Sports Club in the 2017–18 Premier Limited Overs Tournament on 16 March 2018.
