= Sehan Weerasinghe =

Sri Lankan cricketer (born 1995)

Personal information
- Born: 1 November 1995 (age 31)
- Source: Cricinfo, 24 February 2018

Sehan Weerasinghe (born 1 November 1995) is a Sri Lankan cricketer. He made his Twenty20 debut for Negombo Cricket Club in the 2017–18 SLC Twenty20 Tournament on 24 February 2018. He made his List A debut for Negombo Cricket Club in the 2017–18 Premier Limited Overs Tournament on 10 March 2018.
