= Dilum Weerarathne =

Sri Lankan cricketer (born 1996)

Personal information
- Full name: Wijenayake Arachchi Patabedige Dilum Krishan Weerarathne
- Born: 10 July 1996 (age 30); Matara, Sri Lanka
- Batting: Left-handed
- Bowling: Right-arm medium
- Source: Cricinfo, 26 July 2020

Dilum Weerarathne (born 10 July 1996) is a Sri Lankan cricketer. He made his first-class debut for Sri Lanka Air Force Sports Club in Tier B of the 2017–18 Premier League Tournament on 28 December 2017.
