= Suresh Peiris =

Sri Lankan cricketer (born 1990)

Personal information
- Born: 2 October 1990 (age 36); Panadura, Sri Lanka
- Source: Cricinfo, 5 April 2017

Suresh Peiris (born 2 October 1990) is a Sri Lankan cricketer. He made his List A debut for Polonnaruwa District in the 2016–17 Districts One Day Tournament on 21 March 2017. He made his Twenty20 debut for Panadura Sports Club in the 2017–18 SLC Twenty20 Tournament on 24 February 2018.
