= Shiwakumar Tyron =

Sri Lankan cricketer (born 1998)

Personal information
- Born: 21 March 1998 (age 28)
- Source: Cricinfo, 10 March 2018

Shiwakumar Tyron (born 21 March 1998) is a Sri Lankan cricketer. He made his List A debut for Kurunegala Youth Cricket Club in the 2017–18 Premier Limited Overs Tournament on 10 March 2018. He made his Twenty20 debut on 6 January 2020, for Kurunegala Youth Cricket Club in the 2019–20 SLC Twenty20 Tournament.
