= Sajith de Silva =

Sri Lankan cricketer (born 1998)

Personal information
- Full name: Lama Hewage Sajith Priyal de Silva
- Born: 12 August 1998 (age 28); Matale, Sri Lanka
- Batting: Right-handed
- Bowling: Right-arm medium-fast
- Source: Cricinfo, 26 July 2020

Sajith de Silva (born 12 August 1998) is a Sri Lankan cricketer. He made his first-class debut for Kurunegala Youth Cricket Club in Tier B of the 2017–18 Premier League Tournament on 5 January 2018.
