= Supun Withanaarachchi =

Sri Lankan cricketer (born 1997)

Personal information
- Born: 18 May 1997 (age 29); Anuradhapura, Sri Lanka
- Batting: Right-handed
- Source: ESPNcricinfo, 26 July 2020

Supun Withanaarachchi (born 18 May 1997) is a Sri Lankan cricketer. He made his first-class debut for Galle Cricket Club in Tier B of the 2017–18 Premier League Tournament Tier on 15 December 2017.
