= Dinusha Fernando =

Sri Lankan cricketer (born 1979)

Personal information
- Full name: Kandana Arachchige Dinusha Manoj Fernando
- Born: 10 August 1979 (age 47); Panadura, Sri Lanka
- Batting: Right-handed
- Bowling: Right-arm fast-medium
- Role: All-rounder

International information
- National side: Sri Lanka
- Test debut (cap 132): 2 December 2003 v England
- Last Test: 10 December 2003 v England
- Only ODI (cap 117): 18 November 2003 v England

Career statistics
Competition	Test	ODI
Matches	2	1
Runs scored	56	–
Batting average	28.00	–
100s/50s	0/1	–
Top score	51*	–
Balls bowled	126	42
Wickets	1	2
Bowling average	107.00	6.50
5 wickets in innings	0	0
10 wickets in match	0	0
Best bowling	1/29	2/13
Catches/stumpings	0/–	1/–
- Source: Cricinfo, 9 February 2006

Kandana Arachchige Dinusha Manoj Fernando (born 10 August 1979), or Dinusha Fernando, is a Sri Lankan cricketer. He is a right-handed batsman and a right-arm medium-fast bowler. He studied at St. Sebastian's College, Moratuwa.

== Domestic career ==
He made his Twenty20 debut on 17 August 2004, for Sebastianites Cricket and Athletic Club in the 2004 SLC Twenty20 Tournament.

Fernando has played as an Overseas player in England for several years, including for Bromyard CC in the Worcestershire County League Division 1 from 2011 to 2013, and in 2015. In 2017 he played for Brockhampton CC in the Birmingham and District League Premier Division.

== International career ==
A useful middle-order batsman, he initially impressed during 2001 in the Sri Lankan Test series against England. However, despite having had several quality performances for his club, he did not get into the Test squad until November 2003. He bowled to get 2–13 against England in Dambulla in his only ODI. He played in the first two tests of the subsequent series against England, but was dropped after that.
