= Sameendra Madushan =

Sri Lankan cricketer (born 1987)

Personal information
- Born: 10 March 1987 (age 39)
- Source: Cricinfo, 2 March 2018

Sameendra Madushan (born 10 March 1987) is a Sri Lankan cricketer. He made his Twenty20 debut for Panadura Sports Club in the 2017–18 SLC Twenty20 Tournament on 1 March 2018. He made his List A debut for Panadura Sports Club in the 2017–18 Premier Limited Overs Tournament on 16 March 2018.
