= Nilanka Rukshitha =

Sri Lankan cricketer (born 1998)

Personal information
- Born: 29 August 1998 (age 28)
- Source: Cricinfo, 25 February 2018

Nilanka Rukshitha (born 29 August 1998) is a Sri Lankan cricketer. He made his Twenty20 debut for Galle Cricket Club in the 2017–18 SLC Twenty20 Tournament on 25 February 2018. He made his List A debut for Galle Cricket Club in the 2017–18 Premier Limited Overs Tournament on 10 March 2018.
