= Raju Gayashan =

Sri Lankan cricketer (born 1988)

Personal information
- Born: 23 June 1988 (age 38)
- Source: Cricinfo, 19 December 2019

Raju Gayashan (born 23 June 1988) is a Sri Lankan cricketer. He made his first-class debut on 17 November 2006, for Lankan Cricket Club in the 2006–07 Premier Trophy.
