= Ravindra Karunaratne =

Sri Lankan cricketer (born 1987)

Personal information
- Full name: Mudunkothge Lakpriya Ravindra Karunaratne
- Born: 31 March 1987 (age 39)
- Source: Cricinfo, 4 December 2017

Ravindra Karunaratne (born 31 March 1987) is a Sri Lankan cricketer. He made his first-class debut for Saracens Sports Club in the 2007–08 Premier Trophy on 25 January 2008. He made his Twenty20 debut for Negambo Cricket Club in the 2018–19 SLC Twenty20 Tournament on 15 February 2019.

== See also ==
- List of Chilaw Marians Cricket Club players
