= Prabhash Keppitipola =

Sri Lankan cricketer (born 1996)

Personal information
- Born: 20 January 1996 (age 30)
- Source: Cricinfo, 27 February 2018

Prabhash Keppitipola (born 20 January 1996) is a Sri Lankan cricketer. He made his Twenty20 debut for Kurunegala Youth Cricket Club in the 2017–18 SLC Twenty20 Tournament on 27 February 2018. He made his List A debut for Kurunegala Youth Cricket Club in the 2017–18 Premier Limited Overs Tournament on 18 March 2018.
