= Praveen Fernando =

Sri Lankan cricketer (born 1994)

Personal information
- Full name: Warnakulasuriya Praveen Suresh Fernando
- Born: 10 December 1994 (age 31); Negombo, Sri Lanka
- Source: Cricinfo, 15 March 2017

Praveen Fernando (born 10 December 1994) is a Sri Lankan cricketer. He made his first-class debut for Badureliya Sports Club in the 2015–16 Premier League Tournament on 18 December 2015.
