= C. V. Savitri Gunatilleke =

Sri Lankan biologist and professor

Malwattage Celestine Violet Savitri Gunatilleke (born July 30, 1945) is professor emeritus at the University of Peradeniya in Sri Lanka's Central Province. She has had a long career in forest ecology and has been a leader in quantitative ecology and education. Most of her research has focused in the Sinharaja rain forest in Sri Lanka. She considers her main contribution to forest ecology to be spreading the idea that successful forest conservation depends on local conservationists. In line with this, she is proud of her students and their accomplishments in the field of conservation.

== Early life ==
Malwattage Celestine Violet Savitri Gunatilleke was born July 30, 1945, in Bandarawela, Uva Province, Sri Lanka to M. Joseph Peeris and Ruth Peeris. She is the eldest of 6 girls. She received primary education at Little Flower Convent in Bandarawela, an agricultural city in the Badulla District from 1949 to 1953. From 1954 to 1964, she attended secondary school, corresponding to middle and high school, at St. Bridget's Convent in Colombo, the largest city and commercial capital of the island.

== Education ==
In 1965, she began attending the University of Ceylon in Colombo, the only university in Sri Lanka at the time. In 1967 she transferred to the Peradeniya location. By 1969, Gunatilleke graduated First Class Honours with a Special Degree in Botany. She was the second person to qualify for this degree and the first woman. She also earned a subsidiary degree in chemistry. Shortly after graduation, in 1970, she began teaching as an assistant lecturer in the Department of Botany at the University of Ceylon in Peradeniya. Initially, Gunatilleke was planning on teaching plant pathology, the study of organisms and environmental conditions that cause disease in plants. However, upon receiving the position, the head of the Botany Department, Professor Abeywickrama, told her the department already had a plant pathologist and she would be teaching Forest Ecology, shifting the direction of her academic career.

In 1971, Gunatilleke was awarded a Commonwealth scholarship and moved to the University of Aberdeen in Scotland, United Kingdom for postgraduate education where she earned her master's degree in general ecology and a Ph.D. in Tropical Forest Ecology and Conservation. While in Peradeniya, she had been inspired by a presentation from Peter Ashton, a prominent tropical forest expert, on “Sri Lanka’s lowland forests” to study forests and land use issues. She was impressed not only with his knowledge of the tree family he was in Sri Lanka to study, but also his knowledge of the island's geography, roads, and waterways. She wrote to several plant ecologists in the US and UK, including Peter Ashton. Again, Abeywickrama would have an influential role in guiding her path; he suggested she be trained under Ashton because he wanted to strengthen the topic Ashton was offering in his botany department. Gunatilleke did choose to study with Ashton for her Ph.D. Her thesis, “Ecology of the Endemic Tree Species of Sri Lanka concerning their Conservation” is considered a landmark project in quantitative ecological research. The study revealed that a great proportion of endemic tree species were confined to Sri Lanka's lowland rain forests and highlighted the need to conserve them. This research required one year of fieldwork in 6 lowland primary forests in Sri Lanka: Kottawa, Kanneliya and Gilimale (wet zones), Daragoda and Barigoda (intermediate zones), and Ritigala (dry zone).

Although she pursued education outside of Sri Lanka, Gunatilleke planned on spending her career in her home country. Her father's encouragement to "return to the island to serve [her] motherland" played a role in her commitment of to not letting knowledge leave her country. She has stated one of her proudest accomplishments is avoiding the "brain drain".

== Career and research ==
Since 1977, Gunatilleke's main research focused in the Sinharaja rain forest. This forest is located in southwest Sri Lanka and the country's last area of primary tropical rain forest large enough to be sustainable. More than 60% of the tree species are endemic, as are many wildlife, especially birds. In this forest, she investigated the value of tree species diversity. Her work contributed to declaring the Sinharaja rain forest a World Heritage Site on October 21, 1988. This was important as the area was still being logged by the State Timber Corporation in the 1970s at the time of her research. Her research also included recommendations on how to improve conservation in the Sinharaja. For one project, they looked at conditions required for growth to enable nearby villagers to grow tree species in the buffer zone around the protected area so they could continue to use forest resources. Another component focused on planting canopy species in the degraded peripheral areas of the forest to help encourage recruitment of species outside of the preserve. The third main component of their research looked into reconnecting fragmented patches to increase their chance of survival.

She has also conducted research in Kanneliye Rainforest Reserve, Hiniduma, Peak Wilderness Sanctuary, and the Knuckles Forest Reserve.

As a professor, she was also uniquely influential. She had finished her undergraduate studies without visiting a forest and was still a novice with identifying plants in the field when she started her Ph.D., so she wanted to give her students a chance to visit the “outdoor laboratories” Sri Lanka has to offer. She convinced the University of Peradeniya of the importance of field classes and encouraged the school to devote resources to including field work into curriculums. Additionally, she and her colleagues established an arboretum and herbarium for students so specimens from around the island would be available for them to study.

She was also involved with exchange programs with other universities. She was an adviser for students visiting Sri Lanka on exchange programs with Harvard University, Yale University, and Aberdeen University.

She particularly enjoyed interacting with students and seeing their responses to what she taught them. For example, one of the most rewarding parts of teaching for Gunatilleke was when a student understood a topic they had been struggling with. Of the classes she taught, she most enjoyed field classes due to the greater interaction with students.

Since retiring, she has been involved with training government officers, NGOs, local and foreign student groups interested in forest biology and ecology.

== Awards and honours ==
- Honorary Fellowship (2016), by the Association for Tropical Biology and Conservation (ATBC). This is considered to be one of the most prestigious awards in the field of tropical biology. Only 6 women had received the award before Gunatilleke.
- Darwin Initiative (grant)
- EU-Asia (grant)
- John and Catherine MacArthur Foundation (grant)
- National Science Foundation (grant)
- Charles Bullard Fellowship (1982–83). This is a 6-month to year long fellowship for individuals who have established careers. Only 5-7 applicants who show promise of making contributions to forestry or forest related topics are accepted each year.
- Associate of the Arnold Arboretum (1982–83, 1992–93)
- Short Term Research Fellow of the Smithsonian Tropical Research Institute
- Fellow of the National Academy of Sciences of Sri Lanka
- Sultan Qaboos Prize (1997), from UNESCO. This is given to recognize contributions to management or preservation of the environment.
- Woman of Achievement Award for Science (1998)

== Selected works ==
Gunatilleke has published over 40 peer-reviewed research papers and 5 books.

=== Books ===
- Gunatilleke, C.V.S., Gunatilleke, I.A.U.N., Ethugala, A. U. K., and Esufali, S. (2004). Ecology of Sinharaja Rain Forest and the Forest Dynamics Plot in Sri Lanka's Natural World Heritage Site. Wildlife Heritage Trust Publications (Pvt.) Ltd. Pp. 221.
- Ashton, Mark S., Gunatilleke, Savitri, De Zoysa, Neela., Gunatilleke, Nimal., Dassanayake, M.D. and Wijesundera, Siril. (1997). A Field Guide to the Common Trees and Shrubs of Sri Lanka. The Wildlife Heritage Trust of Sri Lanka. Pp. 431.

=== Book chapters ===
- Gunatilleke, C.V.S., Gunatilleke, I.A.U.N. and Sumitraarachchi, B. (1987). Woody endemic species of the wet lowlands of Sri Lanka and their conservation in Botanic Gardens. In: D. Bramwell, O. Hamann, V. Heywood and H. Synge (Eds.), Botanic Gardens and the World Conservation Strategy. Academic Press, London. 183–194.
- Dayanandan, S., Attygalle, D.N.C., Abeygunasekera, A.W.W.L., Gunatilleke, I.A.U.N. and Gunatilleke, C.V.S. (1990). Phenology and floral morphology in relation to pollination of some Sri Lankan Dipterocarps. In: K.S. Bawa and M. Hadley (Eds.), Reproductive Ecology of Tropical Forest Plants. Man & Biosphere Series, The Parthenon Publishing Group, Carnforth, UK & UNESCO, Paris. 7:105-135.
- De Zoysa, N.D., Gunatilleke, C.V.S. and Gunatilleke, I.A.U.N. (1990). Comparative Phytosociology of natural and modified rain forest sites in Sinharaja MAB reserve in Sri Lanka. In: A. Gómez Pompa, T.C. Whitmore and M. Hadley (Eds.), Rain forest Regeneration and Management. Man and the Biosphere Series. The Parthenon Publishing Group, Carnforth, UK & UNESCO, Paris. 6:215-223.
- Gunatilleke, I.A.U.N and Gunatilleke, C.V.S. (1990). Forest conservation and forestry development in Sri Lanka- Conflicts and compromise. In: W. Erdelan, C. Preu, N. Ishwaran, and C.M. Maddumabandara (eds.) Ecology and landscape management in Sri Lanka. Proceedings of the International and Interdisciplinary Symposium on Sri Lanka. Margraf Verlag. pp. 243–254
- Gunatilleke, I.A.U.N. and Gunatilleke, C.V.S. (1993). Underutilized food plants resources of Sinharaja rain forest, Sri Lanka. In: Food and nutrition in the tropical rain forest: Biocultural interactions, C.M. Hladik, A. Hladik, H. Pagazy, O.F. Linares and M. Hadley (eds.) Man and the Biosphere Series, UNESCO, Paris & Parthenon Publishing Co., Carnforth, UK. 15:183-198.
- Gunatilleke, C.V.S., Perera, G.A.D., Ashton, P.M.S., Ashton, P.S. and Gunatilleke, I.A.U.N. (1995). Seedling growth of Shorea section Doona (Dipterocarpaceae) in soils from topographical different sites of Sinharaja rain forest in Sri Lanka. In: M.D. Swaine (Ed.). Man and the Biosphere Series, UNESCO, Paris. Parthenon Publishing, Carnforth, UK 17:245-263.

=== Papers ===
- South-west Sri Lanka: a floristic refugium in South Asia: looks at patterns of species variation in different sites in southwest Sri Lanka.
- Reproductive Biology and Population Genetics of Some Canopy—and Understory—Dominant Tree Species of Sri Lanka: Implications for Conservation Management in a Fragmented Landscape: fragmentation is occurring at an alarming rate and is being compounded by global climate change events.
- Sustainable Forest Management for Mixed-Dipterocarp Forests: A Case Study in Southwest Sri Lanka: studies how to carry out sustainable management of mixed dipterocarp forests, one of the most productive timber forests in the world.
- Biodiversity of Sri Lanka: discusses the cause for loss of biodiversity in Sri Lanka and legal strategies at national and international scales that can contribute to its conservation and sustainable use.

== Personal life ==
She is married to Nimal Gunatilleke. They have conducted research and published together.
