= Malith Cooray =

Sri Lankan cricketer (born 1990)

Personal information
- Born: 30 January 1990 (age 36)
- Source: Cricinfo, 27 February 2018

Malith Cooray (born 30 January 1990) is a Sri Lankan cricketer. He made his first-class debut for Sebastianites Cricket and Athletic Club in the 2009–10 Premier Trophy on 23 October 2009.
