= Nishant (name) =

Indian male name

Nishānt or Nishanth (Sanskrit: निशान्त) is an Indian male name derived from the sandhi of Sanskrit words niśā (निशा) meaning ‘night’ and anta (अन्त) meaning ‘end’, lit. 'End of night'.

== People ==
- Nishant Kumar (politician) (born 1975), Indian politician
- Nish Kumar (born 1985), British stand-up comedian
- Nishant Kumar (cricketer) (born 1988), Indian cricketer
- Nishant Pitti (born 1986), Indian businessman
- Nishant Singh Malkani (born 1987), Indian actor and model
- Nishant Shokeen, Indian film and television actor
- Nishant Tanwar (born 1982), Indian stand-up comedian also known as Joke Singh
- Nishanta Bordoloi (born 1977), Indian cricketer
- Nishanth Sagar (born Nishanth Balakrishnan in 1980), Indian actor
- Nishantha Fernando (born 1970), Sri Lankan cricketer
- Nishantha Fernando (carrom player), Sri Lankan carrom player
- Nishantha Kumara (born 1985), Sri Lankan cricketer
- Nishantha Muthuhettigamage, Sri Lankan member of parliament
- Nishantha Ranatunga (born 1966), Sri Lankan cricketer
- Nishantha Ulugetenne, Commander of the Sri Lanka Navy
