= Roshen Fernando =

Sri Lankan cricketer (born 1997)

Personal information
- Full name: Roshen Fernando
- Born: 4 February 1997 (age 29)
- Source: ESPNcricinfo, 30 December 2016

Roshen Fernando (born 4 February 1997) is a Sri Lankan cricketer. He made his first-class debut for Nondescripts Cricket Club in the 2016–17 Premier League Tournament on 28 December 2016. He made his Twenty20 debut for Negombo Cricket Club in the 2017–18 SLC Twenty20 Tournament on 24 February 2018. He made his List A debut for Negombo Cricket Club in the 2017–18 Premier Limited Overs Tournament on 10 March 2018.
