= Bertram Weerasinghe =

- Born: 1904
- Died: 1971 (aged 66–67)
- Known for: First Ceylonese Chief Fire Officer of Colombo

Bertram Edmund Weerasinghe, OBE (1904–1971) was a Ceylonese engineer and firefighter. He was the first Ceylonese Chief Fire Officer of Colombo.

After studying engineering at the Staffordshire University, Weerasinghe returned to Ceylon and took on an engineering post. Unhappy with the work he applied for and was selected in 1932 to become the first Ceylonese Chief Fire Officer of Colombo Municipal Council. In October 1932, soon after the selection he was sent to Britain for training with the Sheffield Fire Brigade at the Central Fire Station in South Yorkshire under Superintendent Tom Breaks. On returning to Ceylon in 1933 he was appointed as Chief Fire Officer and served until 1946. During World War II he served as Assistant Civil Defense Commissioner and was awarded an OBE for his service. After leaving the Colombo Fire Brigade he went serve as an Assistant superintendent of police (ASP) in the 1950s. In the 1960s he worked as an executive in the corporate sector, serving as the General Manager of Pure Beverages Ltd. In 1962, he appeared in the BBC television programme “This Is Your Life.” with his mentor Tom Breaks the former Chief Fire Officer of Sheffield.

He was also the Golf Champion of Ceylon.
