= Thanura Gunasekera =

Sri Lankan cricketer (born 1996)

Personal information
- Full name: Thanura Malinda Gunasekera
- Born: 6 April 1996 (age 30); Colombo, Sri Lanka
- Batting: Left-handed
- Source: Cricinfo, 26 July 2020

Thanura Gunasekera (born 6 April 1996) is a Sri Lankan cricketer. He made his first-class debut for Lankan Cricket Club in Tier B of the 2017–18 Premier League Tournament on 25 January 2018. He made his Twenty20 debut for Lankan Cricket Club in the 2017–18 SLC Twenty20 Tournament on 2 March 2018.
