= Savin Gunasekara =

Sri Lankan cricketer (born 1996)

Personal information
- Full name: Godallage Savin Tharishka Gunasekara
- Born: 15 July 1996 (age 30); Colombo
- Batting: Right-handed
- Bowling: Right-arm off spin
- Role: all-rounder

Domestic team information
- Years: Team
- 2018/2022: sri lank navy sports club
- 2019-2021/2026 present: Burgher recreation club
- Source: Cricinfo, 14 March 2018

Savin Gunasekara (born 15 July 1996) is a Sri Lankan cricketer. He made his List A debut for Sri Lanka Navy Sports Club in the 2017–18 Premier Limited Overs Tournament on 14 March 2018. He made his Twenty20 debut on 15 January 2020, for Burgher Recreation Club in the 2019–20 SLC Twenty20 Tournament.
