= Mahesh Priyadarshana =

Sri Lankan cricketer (born 1981)

Personal information
- Born: 24 October 1981 (age 45)
- Source: Cricinfo, 25 February 2018

Mahesh Priyadarshana (born 24 October 1981) is a Sri Lankan cricketer. He made his first-class debut for Sri Lanka Police Sports Club in the 2004–05 Premier Trophy on 8 October 2004. In April 2018, he was named in Dambulla's squad for the 2018 Super Provincial One Day Tournament.
