= Danusika Bandara =

Sri Lankan cricketer (born 1986)

Personal information
- Full name: Gamaralalage Danusika Bandara
- Born: 4 September 1986 (age 40); Akurana, Sri Lanka
- Batting: Right-handed
- Bowling: Right-arm leg break
- Role: Bowler

Domestic team information
- Years: Team
- 2008–2019: Sri Lanka Army Sports Club
- 2017–2018: Panadura Sports Club

Career statistics
Competition	First-class	List A
Matches	21	8
Runs scored	184	15
Batting average	12.26	15.00
100s/50s	–/–	–/–
Top score	33*	12
Balls bowled	3,221	310
Wickets	64	9
Bowling average	29.78	23.44
5 wickets in innings	5	–
10 wickets in match	–	–
Best bowling	5/36	3/25
Catches/stumpings	7/–	1/–
- Source: CricketArchive, 31 October 2022

Danusika Bandara (born Gamaralalage Danusika Bandara on 4 September 1986) is a Sri Lankan first-class cricketer. He is a right-handed batsman and right arm leg break bowler who has played for Sri Lanka Army Sports Club (SLASC) and Panadura Sports Club. He was born in Akurana.

Bandara, who had played for SLASC Under-23s during the 2008 season, made his first-class debut for the club's first team in the 2007–08 Premier Trophy on 9 January 2009. He made his List A debut for SLASC in the 2015–16 Premier Limited Overs Tournament on 2 December 2015.

Bandara had a season with Panadura SC in 2017–18 and then returned to SLASC for 2018–19, which was his last season to date. He has played in 21 first-class and eight List A matches.
