= Kalhan Sineth =

Sri Lankan cricketer (born 1991)

Personal information
- Born: 24 July 1991 (age 35)
- Source: Cricinfo, 27 February 2018

Kalhan Sineth (born 24 July 1991) is a Sri Lankan cricketer. He made his Twenty20 debut for Kurunegala Youth Cricket Club in the 2017–18 SLC Twenty20 Tournament on 25 February 2018. He made his List A debut for Kurunegala Youth Cricket Club in the 2017–18 Premier Limited Overs Tournament on 10 March 2018.
