= Thusith de Soysa =

Sri Lankan cricketer (born 1998)

Personal information
- Born: 8 June 1998 (age 28)
- Source: Cricinfo, 10 March 2018

Thusith de Soysa (born 8 June 1998) is a Sri Lankan cricketer. He made his List A debut for Kurunegala Youth Cricket Club in the 2017–18 Premier Limited Overs Tournament on 10 March 2018.
