= Mohammed Alfar =

Sri Lankan cricketer (born 1998)

Personal information
- Born: 3 March 1998 (age 28); Colombo, Sri Lanka
- Source: Cricinfo, 24 February 2018

Mohammed Alfar (born 3 March 1998) is a Sri Lankan cricketer. He made his Twenty20 debut for Sri Lanka Navy Sports Club in the 2017–18 SLC Twenty20 Tournament on 24 February 2018. He made his List A debut for Sri Lanka Navy Sports Club in the 2017–18 Premier Limited Overs Tournament on 12 March 2018.
