= Thanura Gunatilleke =

Sri Lankan cricketer (born 1977)

Thanura Gunatilleke (born 15 January 1977) was a Sri Lankan cricketer. He was a right-arm off-break bowler who played for Tamil Union Cricket and Athletic Club. He was born in Colombo.

Gunatilleke made a single first-class appearance for the side, during the 1995–96 season, against Galle Cricket Club. From the lower order, he scored 3 runs in the first innings in which he batted, and 11 runs in the second.

He bowled seven overs in the match, taking figures of 1-30.
