= Kusal Edussooriya =

Sri Lankan cricketer (born 1997)

Personal information
- Born: 9 July 1997 (age 29); Panadura, Sri Lanka
- Batting: Right-handed
- Bowling: Right-arm medium fast
- Source: Cricinfo, 3 April 2017

Kusal Edussooriya (born 9 July 1997) is a Sri Lankan cricketer. He made his List A debut for Matale District in the 2016–17 Districts One Day Tournament on 18 March 2017. He made his Twenty20 debut for Sri Lanka Navy Sports Club in the 2017–18 SLC Twenty20 Tournament on 25 February 2018.
