= Nipuna Kariyawasam =

Sri Lankan cricketer (born 1991)

Personal information
- Born: 30 August 1991 (age 35)
- Source: Cricinfo, 14 March 2018

Nipuna Kariyawasam (born 30 August 1991) is a Sri Lankan cricketer. He made his first-class debut for Moors Sports Club in the 2012–13 Premier Trophy on 1 February 2013. In April 2018, he was named in Kandy's squad for the 2018 Super Provincial One Day Tournament.
