= Vinodh Perera =

Sri Lankan cricketer (born 1989)

Personal information
- Full name: Mahamarakkalage Vinodh Devinda Perera
- Born: 28 October 1989 (age 36); Negombo, Sri Lanka
- Batting: Right-handed
- Bowling: Right-arm medium-fast
- Role: All-rounder

Domestic team information
- Years: Team
- Bloomfield Cricket and Athletic Club
- Panadura Sports Club
- Kurunegala Youth Cricket Club
- Nugegoda Sports and Welfare Club
- Source: Cricinfo, 5 April 2017

Mahamarakkalage Vinodh Devinda Perera (born 28 October 1989) is a Sri Lankan cricketer. He made his List A debut for Anuradhaura District in the 2016–17 Districts One Day Tournament on 15 March 2017.
