= Hasitha Lakmal de Silva =

Sri Lankan cricketer (born 1991)

Personal information
- Born: 25 March 1991 (age 35)
- Source: Cricinfo, 24 February 2018

Hasitha Lakmal de Silva (born 25 March 1991) is a Sri Lankan cricketer. He made his Twenty20 debut for Sri Lanka Police Sports Club in the 2017–18 SLC Twenty20 Tournament on 24 February 2018. He made his List A debut for Sri Lanka Police Sports Club in the 2017–18 Premier Limited Overs Tournament on 12 March 2018.
