= Suraj Weerasinghe =

Sri Lankan cricketer (born 1996)

Personal information
- Born: 23 April 1996 (age 30)
- Source: Cricinfo, 11 March 2018

Suraj Weerasinghe (born 23 April 1996) is a Sri Lankan cricketer. He made his List A debut for Sri Lanka Navy Sports Club in the 2017–18 Premier Limited Overs Tournament on 11 March 2018.
