= Shohan Rangika =

Sri Lankan cricketer (born 1991)

Personal information
- Born: 18 January 1991 (age 35); Ragama, Sri Lanka
- Batting: Right-handed
- Bowling: Right arm offbreak
- Source: Cricinfo, 9 April 2017

Shohan Rangika (born 18 January 1991) is a Sri Lankan cricketer. He made his first-class debut for Sri Lanka Air Force Sports Club in the 2012–13 Premier Trophy on 1 February 2013.
