= Nishantha Kumara =

Sri Lankan cricketer (born 1985)

Personal information
- Born: 2 March 1985 (age 41)
- Source: Cricinfo, 24 February 2018

Nishantha Kumara (born 2 March 1985) is a Sri Lankan cricketer. He made his Twenty20 debut for Sri Lanka Police Sports Club in the 2017–18 SLC Twenty20 Tournament on 24 February 2018. He made his List A debut for Sri Lanka Police Sports Club in the 2017–18 Premier Limited Overs Tournament on 12 March 2018.
