= Nishantha Fernando (cricketer) =

Sri Lankan cricketer (born 1970)

Nishantha Fernando (born 8 February 1970) is a Sri Lankan cricketer. He was a right-arm bowler who played for Moratuwa Sports Club.

Fernando made a single first-class appearance for the side, during the 1989–90 season, against Burgher Recreation Club. From the tailend, he scored 6 runs in the only innings in which he batted.

Fernando bowled 7 overs in the match, conceding 24 runs.
