= Negombo Cricket Club =

Personnel
- Captain: Dilshan Munaweera

Negombo Cricket Club is a cricket team in Sri Lanka. In March 2017, they made a legal challenge against Sri Lanka Cricket after they were removed from Tier B of the 2016–17 Premier League Tournament. This prevented the 2016–17 Premier Limited Overs Tournament from taking place and it was replaced with the 2016–17 Districts One Day Tournament.

They were one of the teams that took part in the 2017–18 SLC Twenty20 Tournament. They finished fourth in Group A, with two wins and three losses from their five matches. Following the conclusion of the Twenty20 tournament, they also took part in the 2017–18 Premier Limited Overs Tournament. Negombo CC is one of the upcoming first class teams which has done extremely well over the years and gained a spot in the Tier A segment and as a highlight achievement they qualified for the quarter-finals of the T20 domestic tournament led by Dilshan Munaweera.

== Squad ==
The following players were part of the team's squad for the 2020/2021 SLC Twenty20 Tournament:

- Dilshan Munaweera (c)
- Madawa Warnapura
- Upul Indrasiri
- Ashen Silva
- Angelo Jayasinghe
- Lakshitha Manasinghe
- Ayantha De Silve
- Roshen Fernando
- Sahan Appuhami
- Pasindu thirimadura
- Rosco Thatil
- Hareen Weerasinghe
- Chathuranga Rajapaksha
- Seshan Udara
