= 2019–20 Premier League Tournament Tier B =

Cricket tournament

- Dates: 31 January 2020 –
- Administrator: Sri Lanka Cricket
- Cricket format: First-class cricket
- Tournament format: Round-robin
- Host: Sri Lanka
- Participants: 12
- Matches: 42
- Most runs: Dulash Udayanga (584)
- Most wickets: Gayan Sirisoma (64)

The 2019–20 Premier League Tournament Tier B is the second division of the 32nd season of first-class cricket in Sri Lanka's Premier Trophy. The tournament started on 31 January and was originally scheduled to conclude on 11 April 2020.

Lankan Cricket Club won the tournament in the previous season and were promoted to Tier A. They were replaced in Tier B by Sri Lanka Ports Authority Cricket Club after their relegation from Tier A. The league was expanded to twelve teams, with the addition of Kandy Customs Cricket Club, Nugegoda Sports and Welfare Club and Sebastianites Cricket and Athletic Club.

On 16 March 2020, Sri Lanka Cricket postponed the rest of the tournament due to the COVID-19 pandemic. In July 2020, Sri Lanka Cricket announced that Tier A would resume on 14 July 2020. The Tier B tournament never resumed and was cancelled in August 2020 after seven rounds of matches (of eleven planned rounds).

== Points table ==
Team	Pld	W	L	D	T	Pts
Police Sports Club	7	4	0	3	0	99.42
Sri Lanka Ports Authority Cricket Club	7	2	1	4	0	90.83
Bloomfield Cricket and Athletic Club	7	4	1	2	0	82.51
Kandy Customs Cricket Club	7	2	2	3	0	81.58
Panadura Sports Club	7	3	1	3	0	79.44
Galle Cricket Club	7	2	1	4	0	79.08
Nugegoda Sports and Welfare Club	7	3	2	2	0	78.36
Sebastianites Cricket and Athletic Club	7	2	2	3	0	65.46
Kurunegala Youth Cricket Club	7	1	1	5	0	59.59
Sri Lanka Navy Sports Club	7	1	1	5	0	41.76
Sri Lanka Air Force Sports Club	7	0	5	2	0	34.075
Kalutara Town Club	7	0	7	0	0	28.96

== Matches ==
=== Round 1 ===
31 January–2 February 2020
Scorecard

Sri Lanka Air Force Sports Club	v	Kurunegala Youth Cricket Club
317 (88.3 overs); Suminda Lakshan 99 (130); Sameera Sadamal 2/8 (5 overs)		441 (115.1 overs); Zain Abbas 120 (150); Ravindu Sembukuttige 3/78 (23 overs)
282/9 (64 overs); Udayawansha Parakrama 111* (96); Navin Kavikara 4/126 (25 overs)

Match drawn
Air Force Ground, Katunayake
Umpires: Kamal Indrajith and Chaturan Sanjeewa

- Sri Lanka Air Force Sports Club won the toss and elected to bat.
- Pramodh Kumara, Risira Weerasuriya (Sri Lanka Air Force Sports Club), Dilshan Kollure and Sandeep Kunchikor (Kurunegala Youth Cricket Club) all made their first-class debuts.

31 January–2 February 2020
Scorecard

Police Sports Club	v	Sri Lanka Navy Sports Club
357 (83.2 overs); Dulash Udayanga 81* (161); Dilanka Auwardt 7/133 (37 overs)		290 (74.4 overs); Tharusha Fernando 78* (72); Lahiru Diyantha 4/92 (22 overs)
294 (67.5 over); Asel Sigera 64 (90); Dilanka Auwardt 5/110 (29 overs)		150/4 (41 overs); Supun Leelaratne 55* (91); Nisar Ahmad 2/28 (10 overs)

Match drawn
Navy Ground, Welisara
Umpires: RP Massalage and Ranganath Prasanna

- Sri Lanka Navy Sports Club won the toss and elected to field.
- Nisar Ahmad (Police Sports Club) and Shavindu Dissanayake (Sri Lanka Navy Sports Club) both made their first-class debuts.

31 January–2 February 2020
Scorecard

Panadura Sports Club	v	Kandy Customs Cricket Club
177 (50 overs); Harsha Cooray 43 (71); Chirag Khurana 4/57 (20 overs)		191 (54.2 overs); Chanaka Wijesinghe 46 (109); Azhar Attari 4/51 (18 overs)
359 (74 overs); Umesh Karunaratne 114 (134); Sachithra Perera 4/120 (25 overs)		287/6 (86 overs); Chanaka Wijesinghe 107* (212); Umesh Karunaratne 3/46 (12 overs)

Match drawn
Burgher Recreation Club Ground, Colombo
Umpires: Saman Mohan de Silva and Upul Wewage

- Panadura Sports Club won the toss and elected to bat.
- Hasitha Madushan, Sasith Manuranga, P Rajamunindra, Hasitha Perera and Kasun Silva (Kandy Customs Cricket Club) all made their first-class debuts.

31 January–1 February 2020
Scorecard

Nugegoda Sports and Welfare Club	v	Kalutara Town Club
56 (23 overs); Matheesha Perera 12 (48); Mohamed Rashan 4/19 (9 overs)		160 (35.2 overs); Eranga Rathnayake 39 (38); Basit Ali 5/41 (10.2 overs)
307 (93.4 overs); Pramud Hettiwatte 84 (110); Ishan Abeysekara 6/107 (24 overs)		84 (28.5 overs); R Punchihewa 23 (41); Pasindu Madushan 3/17 (5.5 overs)

Nugegoda Sports and Welfare Club won by 119 runs
Arons Cricket Club Ground, Horana
Umpires: Krishantha Rodrigo and Ranjith Vishwakula

- Nugegoda Sports and Welfare Club won the toss and elected to bat.
- Kevin Peiris, R Punchihewa, Mohamed Rashan and Inshaka Siriwardena (Kalutara Town Club) all made their first-class debuts.

31 January–2 February 2020
Scorecard

Galle Cricket Club	v	Sebastianites Cricket and Athletic Club
314 (106.2 overs); Mansoor Amjad 80 (111); Saman Kumara 5/82 (25 overs)		235 (80.2 overs); Thilanka de Silva 86 (134); Abid Hasan 5/54 (20.2 overs)
197/9d (57.5 overs); Mansoor Amjad 88 (158); Saman Kumara 3/34 (11 overs)		50/3 (19 overs); Dasun Senevirathna 19* (35); Saranga Rajaguru 2/32 (8 overs)

Match drawn
Galle International Stadium, Galle
Umpires: Kitsiri Jayaweera and Sisira Kumara Perera

- Sebastianites Cricket and Athletic Club won the toss and elected to field.
- Vinura Dulsara, Kavindu Ediriweera, Jacob Sachin, Ravishka Wijesiri (Galle Cricket Club), Kumar Boresa, Thilanka de Silva, S Fernando, Sachin Fernando, Jiniv Joshi, Saman Kumara, D Peiris and Chamal Perera (Sebastianites Cricket and Athletic Club) all made their first-class debuts.

31 January–2 February 2020
Scorecard

Sri Lanka Ports Authority Cricket Club	v	Bloomfield Cricket and Athletic Club
496 (121.5 overs); Saeed Bin Nasir 121 (166); Gayan Sirisoma 5/156 (44.5 overs)		446 (126.5 overs); Harsha Vithana 176 (314); Chanaka Komasaru 5/127 (48 overs)
70/0 (17 overs); Ramesh Nimantha 51* (53)

Match drawn
Bloomfield Cricket and Athletic Club Ground, Colombo
Umpires: Sanjeewa Fernando and Eric Kannangara

- Bloomfield Cricket and Athletic Club won the toss and elected to field.
- Mithila Aravinda (Sri Lanka Ports Authority Cricket Club) made his first-class debut.

=== Round 2 ===
5–7 February 2020
Scorecard

Kalutara Town Club	v	Police Sports Club
160 (65.1 overs); Hasitha Nirmal 45 (104); Asel Sigera 4/30 (16.1 overs)		184 (61.2 overs); Gitansh Khera 65 (93); Ishan Abeysekara 5/48 (15 overs)
160 (68.3 overs); Ishan Abeysekara 40 (40); Manjula Jayawardene 4/31 (18.3 overs)		137/7 (30.2 overs); Gitansh Khera 43* (33); Ishan Abeysekara 4/76 (13.2 overs)

Police Sports Club won by 3 wickets
Police Park Ground, Colombo
Umpires: Thilak Fernando and Kamal Indrajith

- Police Sports Club won the toss and elected to field.
- Hashan Chamara (Kalutara Town Club) and Mohammed Faheem (Police Sports Club) both made their first-class debuts.

6–8 February 2020
Scorecard

Sebastianites Cricket and Athletic Club	v	Panadura Sports Club
126 (51.2 overs); Jiniv Joshi 33 (102); Chalana de Silva 5/28 (17.2 overs)		238 (66.1 overs); Umesh Karunaratne 56 (89); Naveen Gunawardene 4/40 (10.1 overs)
211 (72.5 overs); Jiniv Joshi 59 (89); Azhar Attari 5/27 (21 overs)		102/3 (21.2 overs); Minhaj Jalill 58* (69); Kumar Boresa 2/44 (9 overs)

Panadura Sports Club won by 7 wickets
FTZ Sports Complex, Katunayake
Umpires: Shantha Fonseka and Nilantha Semasinghe

- Sebastianites Cricket and Athletic Club won the toss and elected to bat.
- Ashen Mendis, Prabath de Zoysa and Naveen Gunawardene (Sebastianites Cricket and Athletic Club) all made their first-class debuts.

7–9 February 2020
Scorecard

Kurunegala Youth Cricket Club	v	Sri Lanka Ports Authority Cricket Club
235 (74.4 overs); Keshan Wanniarachchi 97 (198); Chanaka Komasaru 5/72 (30 overs)		331 (93.1 overs); Hasnain Bokhari 121 (176); Navin Kavikara 5/102 (33 overs)
309/9d (80 overs); Malinga Maligaspe 89 (112); Chanaka Komasaru 6/100 (31 overs)		55/1 (18 overs); Ramesh Nimantha 24 (47); Shiwakumar Tyron 1/14 (5 overs)

Match drawn
SLAOCIC Stadium, Horana
Umpires: Eric Kannangara and Saman Mohan de Silva

- Sri Lanka Ports Authority Cricket Club won the toss and elected to field.

7–8 February 2020
Scorecard

Sri Lanka Air Force Sports Club	v	Galle Cricket Club
96 (34.5 overs); Nilushan Nonis 23 (25); Kavika Dilshan 3/29 (11.5 overs)		275 (80.4 overs); Vinura Dulsara 101 (195); Aravinda Premaratne 5/58 (22.4 overs)
159 (50.3 overs); Risira Weerasuriya 42 (92); Kavika Dilshan 5/65 (21 overs)

Galle Cricket Club won by an innings and 20 runs
Air Force Ground, Katunayake
Umpires: Sanjeewa Fernando and Krishantha Rodrigo

- Sri Lanka Air Force Sports Club won the toss and elected to bat.
- Thisara Dilshan (Galle Cricket Club) made his first-class debut.

7–8 February 2020
Scorecard

Kandy Customs Cricket Club	v	Sri Lanka Navy Sports Club
46 (27 overs); Akeel Inham 13 (37); Savindu Peiris 5/7 (8 overs)		300 (85.2 overs); Tharushan Iddamalgoda 65 (74); Sachithra Perera 5/110 (29 overs)
189 (49.4 overs); Sampath Perera 40* (29); Nilanka Sandakan 5/64 (18 overs)

Sri Lanka Navy Sports Club won by an innings and 65 runs
Navy Ground, Welisara
Umpires: Niroshana Amarasinghe and Chamara de Soysa

- Sri Lanka Navy Sports Club won the toss and elected to field.

8–10 February 2020
Scorecard

Nugegoda Sports and Welfare Club	v	Bloomfield Cricket and Athletic Club
294 (80.2 overs); Denuwan Rajakaruna 51 (90); Gayan Sirisoma 7/97 (37.2 overs)		327 (78.1 overs); Dilhan Cooray 96 (180); Pasindu Madushan 5/74 (17.1 overs)
231 (73.1 overs); Jahangir Mirza 54 (86); Gayan Sirisoma 5/74 (32 overs)		199/5 (34.3 overs); Dilhan Cooray 67 (76); Pasindu Madushan 2/41 (8 overs)

Bloomfield Cricket and Athletic Club won by 5 wickets
Bloomfield Cricket and Athletic Club Ground, Colombo
Umpires: Mohan de Silva and Ranganath Prasanna

- Nugegoda Sports and Welfare Club won the toss and elected to bat.
- Chathura Obeyesekere (Bloomfield Cricket and Athletic Club) made his first-class debut.

=== Round 3 ===
14–16 February 2020
Scorecard

Sri Lanka Ports Authority Cricket Club	v	Sri Lanka Air Force Sports Club
420/8d (115.5 overs); Hasnain Bokhari 160 (231); Gayan de Silva 3/86 (20.5 overs)		78 (28.2 overs); Ravindu Sembukuttige 25 (40); Rajeewa Weerasinghe 5/20 (9 overs)
		123 (40.1 overs) (f/o); Madhawa Nimesh 43 (49); Chaminda Bandara 4/20 (7 overs)

Sri Lanka Ports Authority Cricket Club won by an innings and 219 runs
SLAOCIC Stadium, Horana
Umpires: Palitha de Alwis and Ranganath Prasanna

- Sri Lanka Air Force Sports Club won the toss and elected to field.
- Nusky Ahmed, Gayan de Silva, Shabik Ifthary and Ashintha Malshan (Sri Lanka Air Force Sports Club) all made their first-class debuts.

14–16 February 2020
Scorecard

Sri Lanka Navy Sports Club	v	Sebastianites Cricket and Athletic Club
153 (50.5 overs); Tharusha Fernando 31 (45); Naveen Gunawardene 6/57 (21 overs)		166 (48.4 overs); Dasun Senevirathna 41 (56); Nilanka Sandakan 6/54 (20 overs)
273 (91.4 overs); Tharushan Iddamalgoda 45 (93); Naveen Gunawardene 5/107 (36.4 overs)		199/5 (79 overs); Ranesh Perera 59* (111); Dilanka Auwardt 4/67 (33 overs)

Match drawn
Navy Ground, Welisara
Umpires: Mohan de Silva and Kamal Indrajith

- Sebastianites Cricket and Athletic Club won the toss and elected to field.
- Karan Nande, Navodya Imesh and Sheshan Silva (Sebastianites Cricket and Athletic Club) all made their first-class debuts.

14–16 February 2020
Scorecard

Nugegoda Sports and Welfare Club	v	Kurunegala Youth Cricket Club
413 (103.5 overs); Pathum Madusanka 118 (204); Vinodh Perera 4/97 (20.5 overs)		300 (86.3 overs); Sandeep Kunchikor 69 (139); Chanuk Dilshan 6/113 (37 overs)
106/1 (16 overs); Pathum Madusanka 59* (45); Navin Kavikara 1/24 (4 overs)

Match drawn
Army Ground, Panagoda
Umpires: Vidura Prasad and Krishantha Rodrigo

- Kurunegala Youth Cricket Club won the toss and elected to field.
- Sameera Gunaratne (Nugegoda Sports and Welfare Club) made his first-class debut.

14–16 February 2020
Scorecard

Kandy Customs Cricket Club	v	Kalutara Town Club
443/9d (85 overs); Akeel Inham 148 (202); R Punchihewa 3/78 (16 overs)		237 (67.4 overs); Kevin Peiris 66 (159); Sampath Perera 3/44 (12 overs)
		182 (66.3 overs) (f/o); Hasitha Nirmal 79 (95); Sampath Perera 4/47 (16 overs)

Kandy Customs Cricket Club won by an innings and 24 runs
Panadura Esplanade, Panadura
Umpires: Suranga Perera and Nilantha Semasinghe

- Kalutara Town Club won the toss and elected to field.
- Methushan Thilina (Kandy Customs Cricket Club) made his first-class debut.

14–16 February 2020
Scorecard

Galle Cricket Club	v	Panadura Sports Club
175 (69.2 overs); Ravishka Wijesiri 48 (66); Umesh Karunaratne 4/48 (20 overs)		161 (57.1 overs); 76* (129); Kavika Dilshan 5/45 (18.1 overs)
216 (75.2 overs); Mansoor Amjad 54 (81); Roshan Jayatissa 4/61 (24 overs)		146/6 (36.2 overs); Raju Gayashan 52* (79); Ahmed Jamal 3/46 (9 overs)

Match drawn
Galle International Stadium, Galle
Umpires: Chamara de Soysa and Sanjeewa Fernando

- Panadura Sports Club won the toss and elected to field.

15–17 February 2020
Scorecard

Bloomfield Cricket and Athletic Club	v	Police Sports Club
170 (45.4 overs); Harsha Vithana 50 (65); Nisar Ahmad 6/58 (14.4 overs)		228 (65.3 overs); Dulash Udayanga 54 (149); Madushan Ravichandrakumar 4/46 (14.3 overs)
265 (63.2 overs); Chamara Silva 57 (58); Asel Sigera 5/64 (16 overs)		208/7 (59.3 overs); Lakshan Rodrigo 67 (58); Gayan Sirisoma 4/75 (23 overs)

Police Sports Club won by 3 wickets
Police Park Ground, Colombo
Umpires: Niroshana Amarasinghe and Eric Kannangara

- Police Sports Club won the toss and elected to field.

=== Round 4 ===
19–21 February 2020
Scorecard

Police Sports Club	v	Kurunegala Youth Cricket Club
204 (58.2 overs); Dulash Udayanga 77 (149); Randeera Ranasinghe 3/26 (6 overs)		161 (65.2 overs); Ravindra Karunaratne 58 (135); Nisar Ahmad 4/42 (20 overs)
246 (60.1 overs); Dulash Udayanga 55 (121); Navin Kavikara 6/73 (28 overs)		273 (75.2 overs); Vinodh Perera 80* (83); Lahiru Diyantha 4/58 (14 overs)

Police Sports Club won by 16 runs
Police Park Ground, Colombo
Umpires: Sanjeewa Fernando and Suranga Perera

- Police Sports Club won the toss and elected to bat.
- Malith de Silva (Police Sports Club) made his first-class debut.

21–23 February 2020
Scorecard

Galle Cricket Club	v	Police Sports Club
123 (41.4 overs); Kavindu Ediriweera 30 (76); Chanaka Komasaru 6/54 (19 overs)		300/6d (78.3 overs); Yohan de Silva 76 (153); Chathura Lakshan 3/45 (19 overs)
147/9 (57 overs); Kavindu Ediriweera 43 (141); Hasnain Bokhari 3/39 (14 overs)

Match drawn
Rangiri Dambulla International Stadium, Dambulla
Umpires: Maurice Dela Zilva and Chaturan Sanjeewa

- Sri Lanka Ports Authority Cricket Club won the toss and elected to field.

21–23 February 2020
Scorecard

Nugegoda Sports and Welfare Club	v	Sri Lanka Air Force Sports Club
178 (56.4 overs); Matheesha Perera 67* (101); Suminda Lakshan 4/33 (10.4 overs)		158 (57.2 overs); Risira Weerasuriya 34 (77); Pasindu Madushan 5/21 (13.2 overs)
336/8d (69 overs); Denuwan Rajakaruna 97 (111); Ravindu Sembukuttige 3/39 (10 overs)		186 (54.5 overs); Ravindu Sembukuttige 51 (128); Chanuk Dilshan 4/43 (12.5 overs)

Nugegoda Sports and Welfare Club won by 170 runs
Air Force Ground, Katunayake
Umpires: Shantha Fonseka and Upul Wewage

- Sri Lanka Air Force Sports Club won the toss and elected to field.
- Chamara Fernando (Sri Lanka Air Force Sports Club) made his first-class debut.

21–23 February 2020
Scorecard

Panadura Sports Club	v	Sri Lanka Navy Sports Club
485 (113.1 overs); Vishva Chathuranga 177 (168); Dilshan Lekamge 3/47 (16 overs)		192 (57 overs); Shalith Fernando 50 (65); Roshan Jayatissa 8/98 (29 overs)
		243/6 (100 overs) (f/o); Tharushan Iddamalgoda 81* (206); Chalana de Silva 2/58 (27 overs)

Match drawn
Panadura Esplanade, Panadura
Umpires: Dilshan de Silva and Vidura Prasad

- Panadura Sports Club won the toss and elected to bat.

21–23 February 2020
Scorecard

Sebastianites Cricket and Athletic Club	v	Kalutara Town Club
316 (71.3 overs); Jiniv Joshi 107 (86); Hasitha Nirmal 3/76 (20.3 overs)		200 (52 overs); Eranga Rathnayake 40 (67); Naveen Gunawardene 6/88 (22 overs)
171 (41.3 overs); Karan Nande 39 (55 overs); Hasitha Nirmal 7/58 (17.3 overs)		104 (36 overs); Geshan Wimaladharma 31 (53); Naveen Gunawardene 4/45 (14 overs)

Sebastianites Cricket and Athletic Club won by 183 runs
Arons Cricket Club Ground, Horana
Umpires: Susantha Dissanayake and Kitsiri Jayaweera

- Kalutara Town Club won the toss and elected to field.

22–24 February 2020
Scorecard

Bloomfield Cricket and Athletic Club	v	Kandy Customs Cricket Club
308 (66.5 overs); Chamara Silva 79 (79); Umega Chaturanga 5/80 (19.5 overs)		428 (109.3 overs); Chanaka Wijesinghe 152 (243); Gayan Sirisoma 5/140 (44 overs)
270/7d (72 overs); Harsha Vithana 88 (174); Umega Chaturanga 2/75 (23 overs)		62/3 (19 overs); Sampath Perera 32 (30); Gayan Sirisoma 3/31 (7 overs)

Match drawn
Bloomfield Cricket and Athletic Club Ground, Colombo
Umpires: Kamal Indrajith and Ranjith Vishwakula

- Bloomfield Cricket and Athletic Club won the toss and elected to bat.
- Ravindu Fernando and Tariq Saboor (Bloomfield Cricket and Athletic Club) both made their first-class debuts.

=== Round 5 ===
26–28 February 2020
Scorecard

Sri Lanka Ports Authority Cricket Club	v	Nugegoda Sports and Welfare Club
151 (45.5 overs); Gayan Maneeshan 49 (92); Chanuk Dilshan 4/21 (6.5 overs)		128 (46 overs); Pathum Madusanka 63* (142); Chanaka Komasaru 4/36 (20 overs)
345/9d (87.4 overs); Adeesha Nanayakkara 83 (136); Jalat Khan 3/89 (30 overs)		161 (32.2 overs); Pramud Hettiwatte 55 (49); Chanaka Komasaru 5/63 (16 overs)

Sri Lanka Ports Authority Cricket Club won by 207 runs
SLAOCIC Stadium, Horana
Umpires: Thilak Fernando and Vidura Prasad

- Nugegoda Sports Club won the toss and elected to field.

28 February – 1 March 2020
Scorecard

Sri Lanka Air Force Sports Club	v	Police Sports Club
458 (134.5 overs); Suminda Lakshan 221 (277); Supun Madushanka 3/95 (24.5 overs)		142 (40.1 overs); Gitansh Khera 43 (77); Suminda Lakshan 3/19 (6.1 overs)
16/0 (5 overs); Risira Weerasuriya 9* (19)		421/6 (83.5 overs) (f/o); Gitansh Khera 92 (99); Aravinda Premaratne 3/94 (17.5 overs)

Match drawn
Air Force Ground, Katunayake
Umpires: Niroshana Amarasinghe and Dilshan de Silva

- Police Sports Club won the toss and elected to field.

28 February – 1 March 2020
Scorecard

Panadura Sports Club	v	Kalutara Town Club
361 (94.4 overs); Roshan Jayatissa 128 (125); Eranga Rathnayake 5/99 (24.4 overs)		263 (71.2 overs); Geshan Wimaladharma 54 (101); Kaumal Nanayakkara 5/30 (10.2 overs)
240/3d (41.4 overs); Sanjika Ridma 136* (125); R Punchihewa 2/65 (12 overs)		125 (39.2 overs); Naved Sarwar 38 (47); Kaumal Nanayakkara 3/14 (12 overs)

Panadura Sports Club won by 213 runs
Panadura Esplanade, Panadura
Umpires: Kamal Indrajith and Saman Mohan de Silva

- Panadura Sports Club won the toss and elected to bat.

28 February – 1 March 2020
Scorecard

Kurunegala Youth Cricket Club	v	Kandy Customs Cricket Club
264 (80.4 overs); Randeera Ranasinghe 99 (123); Umega Chaturanga 4/74 (27 overs)		309/7d (84 overs); 154* (199); Navin Kavikara 5/113 (36 overs)
445/8 (96 overs); Ravindra Karunaratne 135 (193); Umega Chaturanga 4/134 (36 overs)

Match drawn
Welagedara Stadium, Kurunegala
Umpires: RP Massalage and Chaturan Sanjeewa

- Kandy Customs Cricket Club won the toss and elected to field.
- Tharaka Gunawardena and Lasindu Nimsara (Kandy Customs Cricket Club) both made their first-class debuts.

28 February – 1 March 2020
Scorecard

Galle Cricket Club	v	Sri Lanka Navy Sports Club
336 (93 overs); Vinura Dulsara 68 (185); Sathik Nimalsha 6/122 (27 overs)		182 (57.2 overs); Buddika Madushan 51* (57); Saranga Rajaguru 3/16 (7.2 overs)
		341/6 (100 overs) (f/o); Supun Leelaratne 73 (153); Ravishka Wijesiri 3/47 (17 overs)

Match drawn
MRIC Stadium, Hambantota
Umpires: Chamara de Soysa and Kitsiri Jayaweera

- Sri Lanka Navy Sports Club won the toss and elected to field.

28 February – 1 March 2020
Scorecard

Sebastianites Cricket and Athletic Club	v	Bloomfield Cricket and Athletic Club
76 (34.4 overs); Dasun Senevirathna 17 (19); Gayan Sirisoma 6/31 (17.4 overs)		255 (67.1 overs); Sachin Jayawardena 96 (136); Naveen Gunawardene 4/98 (31.1 overs)
297 (75 overs); Thilanka de Silva 86 (138); Gayan Sirisoma 6/79 (27 overs)		119/4 (22.4 overs); Kasun Ekanayake 45* (57); Naveen Gunawardene 3/45 (11.4 overs)

Bloomfield Cricket and Athletic Club won by 6 wickets
Bloomfield Cricket and Athletic Club Ground, Colombo
Umpires: Sanjeewa Fernando and Sisira Kumara

- Sebastianites Cricket and Athletic Club won the toss and elected to bat.

=== Round 6 ===
6–8 March 2020
Scorecard

Kurunegala Youth Cricket Club	v	Sri Lanka Navy Sports Club
325 (86 overs); Randeera Ranasinghe 138 (151); Sathik Nimalsha 4/96 (24 overs)		255 (94.4 overs); Tharushan Iddamalgoda 108 (172); Navin Kavikara 4/75 (27 overs)
217/5d (48 overs); Malinga Maligaspe 121* (147); Dilanka Auwardt 2/48 (10 overs)		73/2 (22.3 overs); Supun Leelaratne 27* (33); Navin Kavikara 1/27 (6 overs)

Match drawn
Navy Ground, Welisara
Umpires: Mohan de Silva and Ranjith Vishwakula

- Sri Lanka Navy Sports Club won the toss and elected to field.
- Vimud Sapnaka (Sri Lanka Navy Sports Club) made his first-class debut.

6–8 March 2020
Scorecard

Panadura Sports Club	v	Sri Lanka Air Force Sports Club
234 (38.5 overs); Minhaj Jalill 90 (84); Amitha Kaushalya 5/41 (8 overs)		173 (52.2 overs); Aravinda Premaratne 61 (114); Chalana de Silva 6/48 (19.2 overs)
397 (68.2 overs); Minhaj Jalill 94 (107); Amitha Kaushalya 3/109 (19 overs)		186 (37.5 overs); Aravinda Premaratne 62 (80); Roshan Jayatissa 7/40 (12.5 overs)

Panadura Sports Club won by 272 runs
Panadura Esplanade, Panadura
Umpires: Dammika Rajapakse and Nilantha Semasinghe

- Panadura Sports Club won the toss and elected to bat.
- Ashan Dilhara (Panadura Sports Club) made his first-class debut.

6–8 March 2020
Scorecard

Nugegoda Sports and Welfare Club	v	Kandy Customs Cricket Club
298 (82.3 overs); Jalat Khan 75 (69); Sachithra Perera 6/106 (25 overs)		200 (69.1 overs); Ian Dev Singh 62 (79); Jalat Khan 5/81 (34 overs)
245/8d (51.3 overs); Mohamed Shilmi 56 (77); Lasindu Nimsara 2/12 (3 overs)		158 (45 overs); Akeel Inham 53 (79); Chanuk Dilshan 6/50 (16 overs)

Nugegoda Sports and Welfare Club won 185 runs
Burgher Recreation Club Ground, Colombo
Umpires: Sisira Kumara and Chaturan Sanjeewa

- Nugegoda Sports and Welfare Club won the toss and elected to bat.

6–7 March 2020
Scorecard

Kalutara Town Club	v	Bloomfield Cricket and Athletic Club
120 (46.3 overs); Mohtashim Ali 28 (53); Gayan Sirisoma 7/32 (23.3 overs)		323 (63.1 overs); Nipuna Gamage 128 (145); Ishan Abeysekara 3/98 (19 overs)
285 (46.3 overs); Gihan Rupasinghe 132 (85); Chathura Obeyesekere 5/111 (18 overs)		83/5 (15.3 overs); Madushan Ravichandrakumar 28* (29); Hasitha Nirmal 3/35 (7.3 overs)

Bloomfield Cricket and Athletic Club won by 5 wickets
Bloomfield Cricket and Athletic Club Ground, Colombo
Umpires: Kitsiri Jayaweera and Upul Wewage

- Bloomfield Cricket and Athletic Club won the toss and elected to field.
- Nimantha Perera (Bloomfield Cricket and Athletic Club) and Isuru Pradeep (Kalutara Town Club) both made their first-class debuts.

6–8 March 2020
Scorecard

Galle Cricket Club	v	Police Sports Club
256 (81.3 overs); Damitha Hunukumbura 55 (105); Supun Madushanka 3/36 (14 overs)		195 (64.1 overs); Lakshan Rodrigo 53 (62); Saranga Rajaguru 2/26 (7.1 overs)
180 (62.3 overs); Akalanka Ganegama 42 (41); Manjula Jayawardene 4/43 (15 overs)		242/4 (50 overs); Asel Sigera 92 (123); Abid Hasan 1/20 (9 overs)

Police Sports Club won by 6 wickets
Police Park Ground, Colombo
Umpires: Thilak Fernando and RP Massalage

- Police Sports Club won the toss and elected to field.
- Hasindu Shamika (Police Sports Club) made his first-class debut.

6–8 March 2020
Scorecard

Sri Lanka Ports Authority Cricket Club	v	Sebastianites Cricket and Athletic Club
432/9d (121 overs); Adeesha Nanayakkara 103 (159); Saman Kumara 3/105 (25 overs)		320 (90.2 overs); Navodya Imesh 81 (64); Chanaka Komasaru 5/81 (37.2 overs)
300/9 (52 overs); Saeed Bin Nasir 104 (102); Naveen Gunawardene 3/127 (22 overs)

Match drawn
SLAOCIC Stadium, Horana
Umpires: Eric Kannangara and Krishantha Rodrigo

- Sebastianites Cricket and Athletic Club won the toss and elected to field.

=== Round 7 ===
13–15 March 2020
Scorecard

Sri Lanka Ports Authority Cricket Club	v	Kandy Customs Cricket Club
285 (92.4 overs); Yohan de Silva 110 (214); Methushan Thilina 4/51 (13 overs)		234 (64.5 overs); Chirag Khurana 92 (124); Chanaka Komasaru 6/96 (31.5 overs)
138 (48 overs); Adeesha Nanayakkara 70 (95); Chirag Khurana 6/46 (18 overs)		190/5 (43.3 overs); Chirag Khurana 86 (82); Rajeewa Weerasinghe 3/48 (12 overs)

Kandy Customs Cricket Club won by 5 wickets
SLAOCIC Stadium, Horana
Umpires: Palitha de Alwis and Dilshan de Silva

- Kandy Customs Cricket Club won the toss and elected to field.

13–15 March 2020
Scorecard

Sri Lanka Air Force Sports Club	v	Sebastianites Cricket and Athletic Club
52 (24.3 overs); Chaamikara Hewage 17 (31); Hasantha Fernando 6/31 (12 overs)		459/8d (99.5 overs); Ranesh Perera 100* (116); Suminda Lakshan 3/76 (17 overs)
285 (63 overs); Suminda Lakshan 104 (156); Kumar Boresa 6/86 (25 overs)

Sebastianites Cricket and Athletic Club won by an innings and 122 runs
FTZ Sports Complex, Katunayake
Umpires: Suranga Perera and Upul Wewage

- Sri Lanka Air Force Sports Club won the toss and elected to bat.
- Sanjaya Ranaweera (Sri Lanka Air Force Sports Club) made his first-class debut.

13–15 March 2020
Scorecard

Police Sports Club	v	Nugegoda Sports and Welfare Club
401 (106.1 overs); Dulash Udayanga 143 (207); Pasindu Madushan 3/50 (24 overs)		274 (78.2 overs); Qaiser Ashraf 87 (118); Lahiru Diyantha 4/67 (18.2 overs)
244/9d (45.2 overs); Lakshan Rodrigo 86 (64); Qaiser Ashraf 4/71 (14.2 overs)		168/4 (38 overs); Pathum Madusanka 64 (86); Manjula Jayawardene 4/42 (12 overs)

Match drawn
Panadura Esplanade, Panadura
Umpires: RP Massalage and Chaturan Sanjeewa

- Nugegoda Sports and Welfare Club won the toss and elected to field.
- Rahul Gunasekera (Nugegoda Sports and Welfare Club) made his first-class debut.

13–15 March 2020
Scorecard

Panadura Sports Club	v	Kurunegala Youth Cricket Club
209 (53.1 overs); Roshan Jayatissa 51 (56); Sameera Sadamal 4/58 (18 overs)		190 (60.5 overs); Vinodh Perera 44 (61); Roshan Jayatissa 6/48 (17.5 overs)
220 (51.2 overs); Harsha Cooray 114* (130); Navin Kavikara 8/69 (24 overs)		243/6 (65.3 overs); Ravindra Karunaratne 120 (176); Chalana de Silva 4/94 (23.3 overs)

Kurunegala Youth Cricket Club won by 4 wickets
St. Anne's College Cricket Ground, Kurunegala
Umpires: Chamara de Soysa and Sanjeewa Fernando

- Panadura Sports Club won the toss elected to bat.

13–15 March 2020
Scorecard

Kalutara Town Club	v	Galle Cricket Club
277 (66.1 overs); Geshan Wimaladharma 92 (95); Kavindu Ediriweera 5/70 (18 overs)		156 (42.5 overs); Nimesh Perera 51 (27); Ali Manzoor 5/69 (16 overs)
102 (31.1 overs); Isuru Pradeep 18 (63); Kavindu Ediriweera 6/44 (11 overs)		228/7 (57.2 overs); Chathura Lakshan 60 (70); Ali Manzoor 3/91 (25 overs)

Galle Cricket Club won by 3 wickets
Arons Cricket Club Ground, Horana
Umpires: Eric Kannangara and Krishantha Rodrigo

- Galle Cricket Club won the toss and elected to field.
- Nishant Kantawala (Galle Cricket Club) and Sanka Chathuranga (Kalutara Town Club) both made their first-class debuts.

13 March 2020
Scorecard

Sri Lanka Navy Sports Club	v	Bloomfield Cricket and Athletic Club
36 (14.5 overs); Nilanka Sandakan 16 (34); Gayan Sirisoma 6/2 (7.5 overs)		180 (39.4 overs); Sachin Jayawardena 78 (106); Nilanka Sandakan 5/84 (18 overs)
62 (25.3 overs); Supun Leelaratne 30 (47); Gayan Sirisoma 5/12 (13 overs)

Bloomfield Cricket and Athletic Club won by an innings and 82 runs
Bloomfield Cricket and Athletic Club Ground, Colombo
Umpires: Gamini Gunasekera and Ranganath Prasanna

- Bloomfield Cricket and Athletic Club won the toss and elected to field.

== See also ==
- 2019–20 Premier League Tournament Tier A
