= 2018–19 Premier League Tournament Tier B =

Cricket tournament

- Dates: 31 January 2019 – 23 May 2019
- Administrator: Sri Lanka Cricket
- Cricket format: First-class cricket
- Tournament format: Round-robin
- Host: Sri Lanka
- Champions: Lankan Cricket Club
- Participants: 9
- Matches: 36
- Most runs: Damith Perera (792)
- Most wickets: Dinuka Hettiarachchi (54)

The 2018–19 Premier League Tournament Tier B was the second division of the 31st season of first-class cricket in Sri Lanka's Premier Trophy. The tournament was contested by nine teams, starting on 31 January 2019 and concluding on 23 May 2019. Negombo Cricket Club won the tournament in the previous season and were promoted to Tier A. They were replaced in Tier B by Bloomfield Cricket and Athletic Club after their relegation from Tier A.

Lankan Cricket Club won the tournament and secured promotion to Tier A, after finishing top of the points table ahead of Sri Lanka Navy Sports Club.

== Points table ==
Team	Pld	W	L	D	T	Pts
Lankan Cricket Club	8	1	0	7	0	87.78
Sri Lanka Navy Sports Club	8	3	0	5	0	82.26
Bloomfield Cricket and Athletic Club	8	2	0	6	0	76.07
Galle Cricket Club	8	2	1	5	0	70.20
Panadura Sports Club	8	1	3	4	0	69.50
Police Sports Club	8	0	1	7	0	67.32
Sri Lanka Air Force Sports Club	8	0	0	8	0	66.65
Kurunegala Youth Cricket Club	8	0	3	5	0	60.65
Kalutara Town Club	8	1	2	5	0	50.68

Promoted to Tier A

== Matches ==
=== Round 1 ===
31 January–2 February 2019
Scorecard

Bloomfield Cricket and Athletic Club	v	Sri Lanka Navy Sports Club
371 (102 overs); Sanoj Darshika 99 (200); Kavika Dilshan 6/109 (30 overs)		249 (81.3 overs); Dilan Chandima 73 (99); Madushan Ravichandrakumar 5/59 (19.3 overs)
159/9d (43.2 overs); Madushan Ravichandrakumar 50 (36); Dushan Hemantha 4/60 (13 overs)		175/7 (42 overs); Dushan Hemantha 61 (64); Shaluka Silva 4/41 (12 overs)

Match drawn
Navy Ground, Welisara
Umpires: Maurice Dela Zilva and Shantha Fonseka

- Sri Lanka Navy Sports Club won the toss and elected to field.
- Sanoj Darshika, Kasun Ekanayake, Asel Sigera, Asantha Singappuli (Bloomfield Cricket and Athletic Club), Malinda de Silva, Kavika Dilshan, Shewon Fonseka, Revan Kelly and W Mayantha (Sri Lanka Navy Sports Club) all made their first-class debuts.

31 January–2 February 2019
Scorecard

Kalutara Town Club	v	Lankan Cricket Club
183 (71.2 overs); Nipuna Gamage 68 (128); Shifran Muthaliph 6/40 (16.2 overs)		313 (97.1 overs); Chanaka Ruwansiri 91 (112); Pasindu Madushan 6/102 (36.1 overs)
168 (52.4 overs); Nilushan Nonis 37 (68); Ayantha de Silva 4/41 (11.4 overs)		39/1 (10 overs); Sanjula Abeywickreme 27* (18); Pasindu Madushan 1/17 (5 overs)

Lankan Cricket Club won by 9 wickets
Army Ground, Panagoda
Umpires: Thilak Fernando and Eric Kannangara

- Lankan Cricket Club won the toss and elected to field.
- Sanjula Abeywickreme, Ayantha de Silva, Sawan Kankanamge, Shifran Muthaliph, T Rodrigo and Chandula Weeraratne (Lankan Cricket Club) all made their first-class debuts.

1–3 February 2019
Scorecard

Kurunegala Youth Cricket Club	v	Panadura Sports Club
407 (81.4 overs); Dinushka Malan 107* (138); Navin Kavikara 4/126 (22 overs)		579/8d (123 overs); Thimira Jayasinghe 222* (332); Pasindu Madushan 3/128 (22 overs)
179 (51.2 overs); Sarinda Dassanayake 38 (71); Navin Kavikara 4/59 (19.2 overs)		8/0 (0.2 overs); Vishva Chathuranga 8* (2)

Panadura Sports Club won by 10 wickets
Police Park Ground, Colombo
Umpires: Sanjeewa Fernando and Chaminda Hathurusingha

- Panadura Sports Club won the toss and elected to field.
- Asantha Basnayake, Tharusha Fernando, Charana Nanayakkara (Panadura Sports Club), Rasanjana Jayaratne and Randeera Ranasinghe (Kurunegala Youth Cricket Club) all made their first-class debuts.

1–3 February 2019
Scorecard

Galle Cricket Club	v	Sri Lanka Air Force Sports Club
253 (78.1 overs); Lakshan Rodrigo 48 (66); Ravindu Sembukuttige 3/18 (6.1 overs)		262 (85.1 overs); Sampath Perera 55* (58); Rajith Priyan 3/52 (22 overs)
220/7d (63 overs); Harsha Vithana 61* (90); Umega Chaturanga 4/78 (30 overs)		110/3 (30 overs); Kaushalya Gajasinghe 47* (56); Gayan Sirisoma 2/36 (11 overs)

Match drawn
SLAOCIC Stadium, Horana
Umpires: Niroshana Amarasinghe and Vidura Prasad

- Galle Cricket Club won the toss and elected to bat.
- Kevin Koththigoda, Bawantha Udangamuwa (Galle Cricket Club) and Sachika Udara (Sri Lanka Air Force Sports Club) all made their first-class debuts.

=== Round 2 ===
5–7 February 2019
Scorecard

Kalutara Town Club	v	Sri Lanka Navy Sports Club
209 (75.2 overs); Pasindu Madushan 40 (102); Sathik Nimalsha 4/81 (21 overs)		403/9d (117.1 overs); Dilan Chandima 126 (184); Lakshan Jayasinghe 5/116 (33 overs)
21/1 (4 overs); Ravindu Kodituwakku 11 (11); Dushan Hemantha 1/6 (2 overs)

Match drawn
Surrey Village Ground
Umpires: Kitsiri Jayaweera and Chaturan Sanjeewa

- Sri Lanka Navy Sports Club won the toss and elected to field.
- Sachitha Jayathilake (Kalutara Town Club) and Hashin Dilman (Sri Lanka Navy Sports Club) both made their first-class debuts.

5–7 February 2019
Scorecard

Panadura Sports Club	v	Bloomfield Cricket and Athletic Club
156 (47.4 overs); Vinodh Perera 43 (60); Imran Khan 5/39 (12 overs)		147 (34.1 overs); Chathuranga Dikkumbura 46 (32); Navin Kavikara 7/32 (11.1 overs)
194 (43.4 overs); Kashif Naved 60 (62); Madushan Ravichandrakumar 5/54 (12.4 overs)		206/3 (53.3 overs); Sachin Jayawardena 109* (132); Sehan Weerasinghe 3/64 (14 overs)

Bloomfield Cricket and Athletic Club won by 7 wickets
Bloomfield Cricket and Athletic Club Ground, Colombo
Umpires: Maurice Dela Zilva and RP Massalage

- Panadura Sports Club won the toss and elected to bat.

6–8 February 2019
Scorecard

Police Sports Club	v	Galle Cricket Club
359 (139.5 overs); Uday Kaul 158 (364); Gayan Sirisoma 5/101 (45.5 overs)		290/9 (104.5 overs); Sameen Kandanearachchi 105 (171); Dinuka Hettiarachchi 5/90 (45 overs)

Match drawn
Police Park Ground, Colombo
Umpires: Eric Kannangara and Krishantha Rodrigo

- Galle Cricket Club won the toss and elected to field
- Supun Madushanka (Police Sports Club) made his first-class debut.

6–8 February 2019
Scorecard

Sri Lanka Air Force Sports Club	v	Lankan Cricket Club
315 (93.5 overs); Kaushalya Gajasinghe 75 (114); Dulanjana Mendis 4/78 (26.1 overs)		330 (118.2 overs); Geeth Kumara 128 (238); Ravindu Sembukuttige 3/87 (26 overs)
219/6 (55 overs); Sachika Udara 50 (57); Dulanjana Mendis 3/41 (16 overs)

Match drawn
FTZ Sports Complex, Katunayake
Umpires: Thilak Fernando and Eric Kannangara

- Lankan Cricket Club won the toss and elected to field.

=== Round 3 ===
10–12 February 2019
Scorecard

Panadura Sports Club	v	Sri Lanka Navy Sports Club
193 (51.1 overs); Vishva Chathuranga 77 (112); Kavika Dilshan 4/64 (18 overs)		308 (78.4 overs); Tharushan Iddamalgoda 88 (138); Amitha Kaushalya 4/58 (22.4 overs)
185 (60.4 overs); Nipun Lakshan 59 (70); Kavika Dilshan 5/59 (20 overs)		71/3 (14.4 overs); Revan Kelly 40* (39); Amitha Kaushalya 2/27 (7 overs)

Sri Lanka Navy Sports Club won by 7 wickets
Navy Ground, Welisara
Umpires: Sanjeewa Fernando and Shantha Fonseka

- Sri Lanka Navy Sports Club won the toss and elected to field.
- Amitha Kaushalya and Nipun Lakshan (Panadura Sports Club) both made their first-class debuts.

10–12 February 2019
Scorecard

Kurunegala Youth Cricket Club	v	Lankan Cricket Club
309 (97.4 overs); Damith Perera 67 (135); Dulanjana Mendis 6/48 (31.4 overs)		329 (105.4 overs); Geeth Kumara 88 (228); Ishan Abeysekara 3/67 (14.4 overs)
279/7 (64 overs); Damith Perera 90 (109); Geeth Kumara 4/53 (15 overs)

Match drawn
Welagedara Stadium, Kurunegala
Umpires: Chamara de Soysa and RP Massagalage

- Lankan Cricket Club won the toss and elected to field.
- Lahiru Dilshan, Hiruna Sigera and Deelaka Supun (Lankan Cricket Club) all made their first-class debuts.

11–13 February 2019
Scorecard

Bloomfield Cricket and Athletic Club	v	Sri Lanka Air Force Sports Club
274 (96.1 overs); Geeshat Panditharatne 110 (234); Suminda Lakshan 3/61 (19 overs)		330 (94.5 overs); Sachika Udara 75 (135); Imran Khan 6/84 (21.1 overs)
264/2 (66 overs); Kasun Abeyrathne 131* (209); Sampath Perera 2/28 (7 overs)

Match drawn
Bloomfield Cricket and Athletic Club Ground, Colombo
Umpires: Kamal Indrajith and Krishantha Rodrigo

- Sri Lanka Air Force Sports Club won the toss and elected to field.
- Geeshat Panditharatne (Bloomfield Cricket and Athletic Club) made his first-class debut.

11–13 February 2019
Scorecard

Kalutara Town Club	v	Police Sports Club
146 (52.1 overs); Madhawa Nimesh 53 (93); Dinuka Hettiarachchi 6/51 (23.1 overs)		199 (79.1 overs); Malinga Maligaspe 72 (171); Lakshan Jayasinghe 4/42 (22.1 overs)
243 (62.3 overs); Suresh Niroshan 69 (51); Dinuka Hettiarachchi 5/97 (27.3 overs)		151 (55.3 overs); Sanath Ranjan 56 (103); Lakshan Jayasinghe 5/47 (17.3 overs)

Kalutara Town Club won by 39 runs
Police Park Ground, Colombo
Umpires: Niroshana Amarasinghe and Saman Mohan de Silva

- Kalutara Town Club won the toss and elected to bat.
- Syed Aziz (Police Sports Club) made his first-class debut.

=== Round 4 ===
21–23 March 2019
Scorecard

Kurunegala Youth Cricket Club	v	Kalutara Town Club
392 (120.4 overs); Damith Perera 116 (246); Pasindu Madushan 5/97 (29.4 overs)		262 (90.2 overs); Eranga Rathnayake 79 (141); Rasanjana Jayaratne 5/58 (21.2 overs)
157/5 (42 overs); Damith Perera 67* (114); Eranga Rathnayake 3/38 (12 overs)

Match drawn
Welagedara Stadium, Kurunegala
Umpires: Kitsiri Jayaweera and Nilantha Semasinghe

- Kurunegala Youth Cricket Club won the toss and elected to bat
- Dilum Fernando (Kalutara Town Club) and Sanjeewan Priyadharshana (Kurunegala Youth Cricket Club) both made their first-class debuts.

22–24 March 2019
Scorecard

Galle Cricket Club	v	Bloomfield Cricket and Athletic Club
219 (65.5 overs); Harsha Vithana 98 (179); Thilan Thushara 3/39 (13.5 overs)		128 (72.4 overs); Asantha Singappuli 46 (185); Gayan Sirisoma 3/49 (25 overs)
216 (53.5 overs); Sameen Kandanearachchi 51 (43); Aravinda Premaratne 5/43 (13.5 overs)		205/9 (72 overs); Sachin Jayawardena 55 (81); Suraj Randiv 8/80 (30 overs)

Match drawn
Bloomfield Cricket and Athletic Club Ground, Colombo
Umpires: Saman Mohan de Silva and Eric Kannangara

- Bloomfield Cricket and Athletic Club won the toss and elected to field.
- Dileepa Jayalath (Bloomfield Cricket and Athletic Club) made his first-class debut.

22–24 March 2019
Scorecard

Sri Lanka Navy Sports Club	v	Sri Lanka Air Force Sports Club
190 (64.4 overs); Tharushan Iddamalgoda 91 (151); Roscoe Thattil 4/17 (9.4 overs)		269 (66.5 overs); Roscoe Thattil 59* (65); Hashin Dilman 4/40 (13 overs)
316/8d (76 overs); Supun Leelaratne 124 (188); Suminda Lakshan 3/80 (16 overs)		183/7 (46 overs); Dilip Tharaka 84 (110); Savindu Peiris 3/33 (12 overs)

Match drawn
Air Force Ground, Katunayake
Umpires: Susantha Dissanayake and Vidura Prasad

- Sri Lanka Navy Sports Club won the toss and elected to bat first.
- Shalith Fernando and Savindu Peiris (Sri Lanka Navy Sports Club) both made their first-class debuts.

22–24 March 2019
Scorecard

Lankan Cricket Club	v	Panadura Sports Club
295 (75.2 overs); Shifran Muthaliph 58 (93); Vinodh Perera 3/72 (17.2 overs)		267 (82.4 overs); Mishen Silva 72 (154); Geeth Kumara 3/45 (15 overs)
255/7d (62 overs); Usama Mir 77* (43); Imranullah Aslam 3/28 (17 overs)		117/4 (28 overs); Imranullah Aslam 64 (52); Geeth Kumara 1/5 (4 overs)

Match drawn
Army Ground, Panagoda
Umpires: Chaminda Hathurusingha and Sisira Kumara Perera

- Panadura Sports Club won the toss and elected to field.

=== Round 5 ===
27–29 March 2019
Scorecard

Kurunegala Youth Cricket Club	v	Bloomfield Cricket and Athletic Club
245 (65.3 overs); Sameera Sadamal 77 (103); Asantha Singappuli 2/20 (10 overs)		276 (81.2 overs); Geeshat Panditharatne 99 (178); Rasanjana Jayaratne 4/80 (30 overs)
200 (51.4 overs); Dhanushka Dharmasiri 77 (100); Asantha Singappuli 3/30 (9.4 overs)		173/3 (37.1 overs); Geeshat Panditharatne 59* (63); Lahiru Jayaratne 1/32 (8 overs)

Bloomfield Cricket and Athletic Club won by 7 wickets
Bloomfield Cricket and Athletic Club Ground, Colombo
Umpires: Ranjith Vishwakula and Upul Wewage

- Bloomfield Cricket and Athletic Club won the toss and elected to field.
- Keshan Wanniarachchi (Kurunegala Youth Cricket Club) made his first-class debut.

27–29 March 2019
Scorecard

Sri Lanka Air Force Sports Club	v	Panadura Sports Club
223 (71.4 overs); Dulash Udayanga 76not out (193); Sehan Weerasinghe 6/74 (21.4 overs)		258 (74 overs); Abhishek Gupta 79 (87); Nimesha Mendis 4/41 (13 overs)
302/6d (65 overs); Dulash Udayanga 119* (158); Amitha Kaushalya 4/91 (18 overs)		146/6 (56 overs); Asantha Basnayake 47* (119); Umega Chaturanga 2/16 (11 overs)

Match drawn
Air Force Ground, Katunayake
Umpires: Shantha Fonseka and Kamal Indrajith

- Sri Lanka Air Force Sports Club won the toss and elected to bat.

27–29 March 2019
Scorecard

Police Sports Club	v	Sri Lanka Navy Sports Club
306 (83.4 overs); Nishan Madushka 70 (137); Savindu Peiris 4/120 (29 overs)		284 (84.4 overs); Shalith Fernando 82 (153); Dinuka Hettiarachchi 6/105 (39.4 overs)
290 (72.4 overs); Gitansh Khera 64 (80); Dilanka Auwardt 3/55 (19 overs)		136/5 (29 overs); Tharushan Iddamalgoda 52* (81); Manjula Jayawardene 3/29 (11 overs)

Match drawn
Navy Ground, Welisara
Umpires: Maurice Dela Zilva and Ranganath Prasanna

- Sri Lanka Navy Sports Club won the toss and elected to field.

27–29 March 2019
Scorecard

Kalutara Town Club	v	Galle Cricket Club
149 (55 overs); Nilushan Nonis 34 (82); Suraj Randiv 7/47 (21 overs)		406/6d (103 overs); Damitha Hunukumbura 127 (239); Eranga Rathnayake 3/63 (22 overs)
142 (46.5 overs); Nipuna Gamage 43 (104); Gayan Sirisoma 5/46 (15.5 overs)

Galle Cricket Club won by an innings and 115 runs
Galle International Stadium, Galle
Umpires: Maurice Dela Zilva and Krishantha Rodrigo

- Kaltutara Town Club won the toss and elected to bat.
- Geethal Malinda (Kalutara Town Club) made his first-class debut.

=== Round 6 ===
1–3 April 2019
Scorecard

Panadura Sports Club	v	Kalutara Town Club
395 (94.5 overs); Charana Nanayakkara 159 (191); Asif Raza 4/81 (16.5 overs)		152 (43 overs); Pasindu Madushan 37* (45); Tharusha Fernando 2/19 (6 overs)
75/3 (11 overs); Vinodh Perera 30* (32); Eranga Rathnayake 2/34 (5 overs)		430/5d (115 overs) (f/o); Akeel Inham 142 (211); Vinodh Perera 2/64 (13 overs)

Match drawn
Panadura Esplanade, Panadura
Umpires: Vidura Prasad and Chaturan Sanjeewa

- Panadura Sports Club won the toss and elected to bat.
- Vishal Amugoda and Sumudu Sameera (Kalutara Town Club) both made their first-class debuts.

1–3 April 2019
Scorecard

Sri Lanka Navy Sports Club	v	Kurunegala Youth Cricket Club
223 (57.3 overs); Supun Leelaratne 63 (90); Dinushka Malan 4/29 (13 overs)		199 (47.3 overs); Dhanushka Dharmasiri 60 (47); Savindu Peiris 6/51 (16.3 overs)
204 (76.2 overs); Kavika Dilshan 35 (180); Chandima Vijaya Bandara 3/19 (14.3 overs)		214 (53.5 overs); Damith Perera 62 (84); Kavika Dilshan 4/75 (19 overs)

Sri Lanka Navy Sports Club won by 14 runs
Welagedara Stadium, Kurunegala
Umpires: Niroshana Amarasinghe and Nilantha Semasinghe

- Sri Lanka Navy Sports Club won the toss and elected to bat.
- Chandima Vijaya Bandara (Kurunegala Youth Cricket Club) made his first-class debut.

1–3 April 2019
Scorecard

Lankan Cricket Club	v	Police Sports Club
246 (83.5 overs); Shifran Muthaliph 106* (189); Manjula Jayawardene 3/61 (23 overs)		265 (85.2 overs); Malinga Maligaspe 66 (123); Chanaka Ruwansiri 3/69 (18.2 overs)
225/8d (56 overs); Geeth Kumara 60 (106); Dinuka Hettiarachchi 4/84 (21 overs)		122/4 (48 overs); Manjula Jayawardene 43* (118); Chanaka Devinda 2/14 (7 overs)

Match drawn
Army Ground, Panagoda
Umpires: Sanjeewa Fernando and Chaminda Hathurusingha

- Lankan Cricket Club won the toss and elected to bat.

=== Round 7 ===
7–9 April 2019
Scorecard

Kurunegala Youth Cricket Club	v	Sri Lanka Air Force Sports Club
509 (106 overs); Dulaj Ranatunga 163 (160); Umega Chaturanga 4/133 (32 overs)		334 (78.1 overs); Suminda Lakshan 120 (132); Lahiru Jayaratne 4/69 (17 overs)
		346/5 (60 overs) (f/o); Chaamikara Hewage 142* (136); Sanjeewan Priyadharshana 2/108 (15 overs)

Match drawn
Welagedara Stadium, Kurunegala
Umpires: Mohan de Silva and Sisira Kumara Perera

- Kurunegala Youth Cricket Club won the toss and elected to bat.
- Dulaj Ranatunga (Kurunegala Youth Cricket Club) made his first-class debut.

7–9 April 2019
Scorecard

Bloomfield Cricket and Athletic Club	v	Police Sports Club
385 (134.3 overs); Sachin Jayawardene 165 (331); Dinuka Hettiarachchi 6/127 (52.3 overs)		239 (75.5 overs); Pawan Dias 73 (116 overs); Madushan Ravichandrakumar 6/76 (26.5 overs)
266/5 (57 overs); Asantha Singappuli 117 (152); Supun Madushanka 2/28 (5 overs)

Match drawn
Police Park Ground, Colombo
Umpires: Maurice Dela Zilva and Saman Mohan de Silva

- Bloomfield Cricket and Athletic Club won the toss and elected to bat.

8–9 April 2019
Scorecard

Panadura Sports Club	v	Galle Cricket Club
111 (31.4 overs); Kashif Naved 26* (32); Gayan Sirisoma 8/50 (15.4 overs)		285 (58.5 overs); Harsha Vithana 75 (96); Kaumal Nanayakkara 4/106 (23 overs)
135 (31.4 overs); Thimira Jayasinghe 33 (52); Rajeewa Weerasinghe 5/42 (8 overs)

Galle Cricket Club won by an innings and 39 runs
Panadura Esplanade, Panadura
Umpires: Thilak Fernando and Kamal Indrajith

- Panadura Sports Club won the toss and elected to bat.
- Ashan Madhushanka (Galle Cricket Club) made his first-class debut.

=== Round 8 ===
17–19 April 2019
Scorecard

Lankan Cricket Club	v	Galle Cricket Club
334 (100.1 overs); Maduranga Zoysa 117 (127); Gayan Sirisoma 4/108 (35 overs)		272/6 (66.5 overs); Lakshan Rodrigo 104 (115); Chanaka Devinda 2/61 (17 overs)

Match drawn
SLAOCIC Stadium, Horana
Umpires: Ranganath Prasanna and Krishantha Rodrigo

- Galle Cricket Club won the toss and elected to field.
- Poorna Charuka (Lankan Cricket Club) made his first-class debut.

17–19 April 2019
Scorecard

Police Sports Club	v	Sri Lanka Air Force Sports Club
398 (115.5 overs); Gitansh Khera 164 (231); Umega Chaturanga 6/100 (40.5 overs)		210 (77.3 overs); Dulash Udayanga 56 (93); Manjula Jayawardene 6/38 (21.3 overs)
		138/6 (45 overs) (f/o); Dulash Udayanga 55* (118); Manjula Jayawardene 3/29 (14 overs)

Match drawn
Air Force Ground, Katunayake
Umpires: Maurice Dela Zilva and Upul Wewage

- Sri Lanka Air Force Sports Club won the toss and elected to field.
- Pavan Rathnayake (Police Sports Club) made his first-class debut.

=== Round 9 ===
9–11 May 2019
Scorecard

Kalutara Town Club	v	Bloomfield Cricket and Athletic Club
406/9d (111 overs); Akeel Inham 165 (285); Asantha Singappuli 3/119 (27 overs)		208 (64 overs); Sanoj Darshika 82* (145); Pasindu Madushan 5/76 (23 overs)
319/8d (61 overs); Akeel Inham 103 (108); 6/37 (6 overs)		116/1 (19 overs); Kasun Abeyrathne 54* (52); Nilushan Nonis 1/37 (6 overs)

Match drawn
Bloomfield Cricket and Athletic Club Ground, Colombo
Umpires: Niroshana Amarasinghe and Chaminda Hathurusingha

- Bloomfield Cricket and Athletic Club won the toss and elected to field.
- Ranmith Jayasena (Kalutara Town Club) made his first-class debut.

9–11 May 2019
Scorecard

Kurunegala Youth Cricket Club	v	Galle Cricket Club
343 (101.3 overs); Lahiru Jayaratne 78 (215); Akalanka Ganegama 5/86 (21.3 overs)		290 (59.5 overs); Dilum Sudeera 54 (80); Thusith de Soysa 4/67 (17.5 overs)
197 (56.4 overs); Keshan Wanniarachchi 37* (70); Hasnain Bokhari 4/92 (24 overs)		192/9 (43 overs); Nisal Randika 52 (74); Rasanjana Jayaratne 4/61 (12 overs)

Match drawn
Welagedara Stadium, Kurunegala
Umpires: Chamara de Soysa and Shantha Fonseka

- Kurunegala Youth Cricket Club won the toss and elected to bat.
- Dilum Sudeera (Galle Cricket Club) made his first-class debut.

9–11 May 2019
Scorecard

Panadura Sports Club	v	Police Sports Club
294 (100.2); Asantha Basnayake 106 (208); Manjula Jayawardene 4/59 (24.2 overs)		267 (77.1 overs); Mahesh Priyadarshana 113 (144); Sameendra Madushan 3/59 (24 overs)
255 (87.1 overs); Nipuna Deshan 78 (211); Manjula Jayawardene 4/57 (22.1 overs)		105/3 (11 overs); Ajantha Mendis 45 (25); Kaumal Nanayakkara 2/36 (5 overs)

Match drawn
Police Park Ground, Colombo
Umpires: Saman Mohan de Silva and Ranjith Vishwakula

- Panadura Sports Club won the toss and elected to bat.
- Nipuna Deshan, Joseph Fernando and Ragon Perera (Panadura Sports Club) all made their first-class debuts.

9–11 May 2019
Scorecard

Lankan Cricket Club	v	Sri Lanka Navy Sports Club
223 (57.4 overs); Thushira Madanayake 72 (105); Kavika Dilshan 4/70 (19.4 overs)		212 (60.1 overs); Shewon Fonseka 75 (78); Lakshitha Manasinghe 4/44 (18 overs)
347 (80.2 overs); Lahiru Dilshan 139 (146); Savindu Peiris 6/118 (26.2 overs)		224/9 (71 overs); Shalith Fernando 48 (81); Shifran Muthaliph 3/46 (11 overs)

Match drawn
Navy Ground, Welisara
Umpires: Eric Kannangara and Sisira Kumara Perera

- Sri Lanka Navy Sports Club won the toss and elected to field.
- Lakshitha Manasinghe, Aishka Perera, Dunith Wellalage (Lankan Cricket Club) and T Kavinda (Sri Lanka Navy Sports Club) all made their first-class debuts.

=== Round 10 ===
15–17 May 2019
Scorecard

Lankan Cricket Club	v	Bloomfield Cricket and Athletic Club
410 (108/4 overs); Sawan Kankanamge 117 (217); Thilan Thushara 4/64 (20 overs)		315 (75.4 overs); Kasun Abeyrathne 70 (95); Shifran Muthaliph 4/57 (17.4 overs)
248/6d (52.4 overs); Sanjula Abeywickreme 113* (154); Chathuranga Dikkumbura 3/27 (5 overs)		116/3 (16 overs); Thilan Thushara 54 (28); Thushira Madanayake 1/12 (2 overs)

Match drawn
Bloomfield Cricket and Athletic Club Ground, Colombo
Umpires: Sanjeewa Fernando and Chaturan Sanjeewa

- Bloomfield Cricket and Athletic Club won the toss and elected to field.
- Shashika Dulshan and Ashen Maleesha (Lankan Cricket Club) both made their first-class debuts.

15–16 May 2019
Scorecard

Sri Lanka Navy Sports Club	v	Galle Cricket Club
130 (34.1 overs); Tharushan Iddamalgoda 32 (36); Rajeewa Weerasinghe 6/30 (13.1 overs)		57 (20.2 overs); Sameen Kandanearachchi 13 (9); Savindu Peiris 4/21 (10.2 overs)
118 (39.5 overs); Supun Leelaratne 27 (62); Rajeewa Weerasinghe 6/38 (16 overs)		183 (52.1 overs); Hasnain Bokhari 63 (98); Savindu Peiris 5/53 (14 overs)

Sri Lanka Navy Sports Club won by 8 runs
Navy Ground, Welisara
Umpires: Kamal Indrajith and Vidura Prasad

- Sri Lanka Navy Sports Club won the toss and elected to bat.

=== Round 11 ===
21–23 May 2019
Scorecard

Sri Lanka Air Force Sports Club	v	Kalutara Town Club
335 (97.4 overs); Suminda Lakshan 153 (182); Pasindu Madushan 5/100 (27 overs)		307 (91.4 overs); Nilushan Nonis 85 (171); Suminda Lakshan 5/85 (33 overs)
258/6 (60.3 overs); Suminda Lakshan 89 (109); Lakshan Jayasinghe 2/27 (8.3 overs)

Match drawn
Surrey Village Ground, Maggona
Umpires: R P Massalage and Ranganath Prasanna

- Sri Lanka Air Force Sports Club won the toss and elected to bat.
- MSS Jayasekara, Lahiru Kumara, DT Liyanage, S Priyamal and Hashan Vimukthi (Sri Lanka Air Force Sports Club) all made their first-class debuts.

21–23 May 2019
Scorecard

Kurunegala Youth Cricket Club	v	Police Sports Club
262 (74.2 overs); Anurudda Rajapakse 77 (118); Manjula Jayawardene 4/75 (23.2 overs)		439 (116.2 overs); Nishan Madushka 143 (241); Anurudda Rajapakse 4/103 (32.2 overs)
402/9 (59.4 overs); Damith Perera 106 (57); Manjula Jayawardene 3/158 (26.4 overs)

Match drawn
Welagedara Stadium, Kurunegala
Umpires: Mohan de Silva and Upul Wewage

- Kurunegala Youth Cricket Club won the toss and elected to bat.

== See also ==
- 2018–19 Premier League Tournament Tier A
