= Fonseka =

Fonseka (Sinhala: ෆොන්සේකා, romanized: Fonsēkā) is a Sri Lankan surname of Portuguese origin. Notable people with the surname include:

- Andrea Fonseka (born 1984), Malaysian actress, model, beauty pageant titleholder
- Anoma Fonseka (born 1957), Sri Lankan wife of Sarath Fonseka
- Bibile Fonseka, Ceylonese politician
- Bhavani Fonseka, Sri Lankan lawyer and activist
- Carlo Fonseka (1933–2019), Sri Lankan physician, academic and political activist
- Damayanthi Fonseka (born 1960), Sri Lankan Actress
- Errol Fonseka, Seychellois businessman and politician
- Eugene Reginald de Fonseka (1912–2003), Sri Lankan lawyer and puisne justice of the Supreme Court
- J. P. de Fonseka (1897–1948), Sri Lankan essayist and editor
- Lionel de Fonseka, Sri Lankan writer and art critic
- Malini Fonseka (1947–2025), Sri Lankan actress, filmmaker and politician
- Mervyn Fonseka (1897–1946), Sri Lankan lawyer and 15th Solicitor General
- Sakuranga Fonseka (born 1993), Sri Lankan cricketer
- Saman Fonseka (born 1969), Sri Lankan cricketer
- Samanalee Fonseka (born 1981), Sri Lankan actress and singer
- Sarath Fonseka (born 1950), Sri Lankan Army officer, Field Marshal and politician
- Senali Fonseka (born 1992), Sri Lankan actress
- Shantha Fonseka (born 1975), Sri Lankan cricketer and umpire
- Shewon Fonseka (born 1998), Sri Lankan cricketer
- Sriyani Kulawansha-Fonseka (born 1970), Sri Lankan athlete
- Susantha de Fonseka (1900–1963), Ceylonese statesman and diplomat
