= Sumudu =

Sumudu is a given name. Notable people with the surname include:

- Sumudu Atapattu, Sri Lankan jurist
- Sumudu Fernando (born 1981), Sri Lankan cricketer
- Sumudu Sameera (born 1995), Sri Lankan cricketer
- Sumudu Suranga (born 1982), Sri Lankan cricketer
- Sumudu Premachandra, Sri Lankan judge
