= Suranga (disambiguation) =

Suranga is a traditional Indian water management system.

Suranga may also refer to:

== People ==
- Sumudu Suranga (born 1982), Sri Lankan cricketer
- Suranga Adikari (born 1979), Sri Lankan athlete
- Suranga Arunakumara (born 1978), Sri Lankan cricketer
- Suranga Chandratillake (born 1977), Sri Lankan entrepreneur
- Suranga Lakmal (born 1987), Sri Lankan cricketer
- Suranga Lokubalasuriya, Sri Lankan cricketer
- Suranga Nanayakkara (born 1981), Sri Lankan computer scientist and inventor
- Suranga Perera (born 1974), Sri Lankan cricketer
- Suranga Sampath, Sri Lankan blind cricketer

== Places ==
- Suranga, Dhanbad, a census town in Dhanbad district, Jharkhand, India
