= Wimaladharma =

Wimaladharma is a surname. Notable people with the surname include:

- Geshan Wimaladharma (born 1992), Sri Lankan cricketer
- Yashoda Wimaladharma (born 1970), Sri Lankan actress
