= Kantawala =

Kantawala is a surname. Notable people with the surname include:

- R. M. Kantawala
- Nishant Kantawala
- Hargovinddas Kantawala
