= Atapattu =

Atapattu (also spelled as Athapaththu, Sinhalese: අතපත්තු) is a Sri Lankan surname from the Sinhalese language. referring to royal guards, in historical contexts like the Kandyan Kingdom, linked to terms like Atapattuwa (royal guard).

During the Kotte period and subsequent eras, the troops guarding the palaces of Sinhala kings and governors were known as Maha Atapattu and the troops guarding the palaces of governors (දිසාපතිවරුන්ගේ) were known as Disa Atapattu. There is no evidence to say for sure when the Atapattu service began in this country. Although historians such as Queros, Ribeiro and Couto have mentioned Atapattu and Atapattu officials in their works regarding the Kotte period, it does not appear that there is any mention of Atapattu or Atapattu officials in any book written before the Kotte period. There is mention of an Atapattu army of King Mayadunne (1521-1581) belonging to the Seethawaka period and an Atapattu army of King Seethawaka Rajasinghe (1581-1593) in Queros' book "Lankavijaya (ලංකාවිජය)" (Conquista Temporale Espiritual de Ceylão). It is evident from Doyle's description of the constitution of the Kandy kingdom that the Atapattu service, which can be considered to have begun around the Kotte period, continued until the end of the Kandyan period. The service organization for the Atapattu was called the Atapattu Division (අතපත්තු වසම). Those who belonged to it were important people of that district or country. Doyle mentions that there was an Atapattu Division in each Korala. Some of these were the Atapattu Division of Galboda Korala, the Atapattu Division of Kinigoda Korala, the Atapattu Division of Paranakuruwa Korala and the Atapattu Division of Beligal Korala. The head of a Korala Atapattu was called the Atapattu Secretary (අතපත්තු ලේකම්). Some scholars agree that the term Atapattu Secretary (අතපත්තු ලේකම්) was very much used in the upcountry areas and that the officer was known as the Atapattu Mudali (අතපත්තු මුදලි) in the down-country areas. It seems that the Atapattu Mudali was a usage that existed in some provinces instead of the Mudiyanse (මුදියන්සේ) The place where the guard guarding the palace was stationed was called Atapattu Maduwa or Atapattu Murapala. The Atapattu Maduwa was in charge of a Nilame. Or a Muhandiram. He was called Atapattu Nilame (නිලමේ) or Muhandiram( මුහන්දිරම්). Under him were two Atapattu Kankanams (කංකානම්වරු) and a few ordinary soldiers known as Atapattu Appuhamilas(අප්පුහාමිලා). In the early Kandyan period, there were fifty or sixty Atapattu Appuhamilas in the Atapattu army guarding the palace, but during the reign of King Sri Wickrama Rajasinghe (1798-1815), Doyle says, there were only 48. The main duty assigned to them was to guard the palace, but the Atapattu Appuhamilas, who guarded the four gates of the palace by casting the water in the water troughs and indicating the time by striking the coin, were also assigned to the Atapattu Appuhamilas, who guarded the four gates of the palace. It seems that some of them accompanied the king for his protection when he went on a tour of the country. Several occasions when the Atapattu army fought for their king in the battles fought by the kings of Kotte, Sitawaka and Kandy against the Pratikals(ප්‍රතිකාලුන්ට) are mentioned in Queros' "Lankavijaya" and Ribeiro's History of Lanka. Queros says that when the Munnessaram temple (මුන්නේස්සරම් කෝවිල) was destroyed by the Pratikals in about 1578, it was an Atapattu Mudali who came with an Atapattu army to fight for the king against the Pratikals in order to protect it. King Senarath of the Kandy Kingdom (1604-1635) attempted to send an army under one Atapattu Mudali to attack the Pratikals in Jaffna around 1629, but the Pratikals were informed in advance and were defeated, according to Ribeiro's History of Lanka. Therefore, it is possible that the Atapattu army served not only as a guard of the king's palace but also as a soldier of the king. Their leader on the battlefield was the Atapattu Secretary(අතපත්තු ලේකම්), known by Pratikal historians as Atapattu Mudali. The officer in charge of the Sinhala Laskirinha army in each of the districts under the Pratikal and Dutch governments in Sri Lanka was called Atapattu Mudali, and the tholkas of the Pratikal and Dutch governors were called Atapattu Mudali. Even during the British period in Sri Lanka, the tholkas of the governors of Colombo and Galle were called Atapattu Mudali. Under the new revenue administration system imposed by the British in the coastal provinces of Sri Lanka in 1798, the officer who assisted the office of the Chief Revenue Officer and acted as the leader of the Korale Mudali was also called Atapattu Mudali. This shows that the position of Atapattu Mudali was not limited to the officer in charge of the Atapattu army that guarded the palace or the governor's palace. The head of the District Atapattu was the Atapattu Secretary or Atapattu Mohottala. The later historians such as Queros, Ribeiro and Couto have called the Atapattu Secretary the Atapattu Mudali. Doyle states that there were four Atapattu Arachchilas and many Atapattu Appuhamilas under him. It seems that the guarding of the District Agent's Gate had to be done in turns by the various Atapattu divisions. Doyle states that during the late Kandyan period, the guarding of the Kandy District Agent's Gate was first done by the Atapattu divisions of Galboda and Kinigoda, then by the Atapattu divisions of Paranakuruwa, and finally by the Atapattu divisions of Beligalkorale. The number of Appuhamilas who were engaged in guard duty at one time in one Atapattu division was usually between 25 and 30. As a fine for guard duty, two silver coins per day had to be paid to the District Agent. This fine was called "Mura Ridi". The District Atapattu guards the District Governor's gate from the Atapattu hut. The District's flag, the turban(මුතුකුඩය), the turban(වඩනා තලාත්ත), the turban(සේසත්), etc., the secretary's hammer and the guard weapons were in the custody of the District Atapattu Appuhamila. Guarding the prisoners kept in the Atapattu hut was also a duty of the Atapattu Appuhamila. Carrying the orders and messages of the District Governor and protecting the District Governor when he went on a tour of the area under his jurisdiction was another duty assigned to the Atapattu Appuhamila. Atapattu Arachchila was assigned to carry the District's flag and the guard during royal ceremonies. Therefore, the Atapattu Arachchila was also called the Perasmune Rala (පෙරමුණේ රාළ). It seems that there was also a section of Atapattu Appuhamila who was responsible for engraving the guns, knives, chestnuts and keys that were in the possession of the District Atapattu. Although they were not paid for their service as atapattu, they were given village lands by the government for their livelihood. These villages were called atapattu villages or atapattu paguwa(පංගුව). They did not have to do any work for the king except guarding the palace or the governor's palace. However, when the governor came to his district for work, and when the secretary of atapattu and the arachchila(ආරච්චිල) of atapattu came to their koralas for work, the people of that atapattu domain had to provide them with food. It is said that atapattu services were performed in famous temples and famous temples, as well as in the Temple of the Tooth and the Sripada Sthana during the Kandy period. The atapattu services performed at these places also served to guard those places. In some parts of Sri Lanka, there is also a family name called "Athapattu". It is believed that those who bear this surname are descendants of those who belonged to the ancient Athapattu domains.(http://encyclopedia.gov.lk/si_encyclopedia/, 2023)

. Notable people with the surname include:

- Chamari Athapaththu, Sri Lankan cricketer
- D. P. Atapattu (1899–1976), Sri Lankan lawyer and politician
- Marvan Atapattu, Sri Lankan cricketer
- Ranjit Atapattu (1933–2018), Sri Lankan physician and politician, son of D. P.
- Sumudu Atapattu, Sri Lankan jurist
