= Nipuna =

Nipuna is a Sinhalese given name. Notable people with the name include:

- Nipuna Deshan (born 1999), Sri Lankan cricketer
- Nipuna Gamage (born 1995), Sri Lankan cricketer
- Nipuna Kariyawasam (born 1991), Sri Lankan cricketer
- Nipuna Ranawaka (born 1990), Sri Lankan businessman
- Nipuna Senaratne (born 1993), English cricketer
