= Ragon =

Ragon may refer to:

== People ==
=== Surname ===
- Charles Ragon de Bange (1833–1914), French artillery officer and Polytechnician
- Heartsill Ragon (1885–1940), United States Representative from Arkansas
- Henriette Ragon (1918–2015), stage name Patachou, French singer and actress
- Jean-Marie Ragon (1781–1862), French freemason, author, and editor
- Michel Ragon (1924–2020), French art and literature critic and writer
- Phillip Ragon, American entrepreneur and philanthropist, founder and current CEO of InterSystems

=== Given name ===
- Ragon Perera (born 1985), Sri Lankan cricketer

== Other uses ==
- Ragon Institute, a medical institute at the Massachusetts General Hospital in Boston, Massachusetts, United States
