= Udayanga =

Udayanga is a Sinhalese name that may refer to the following notable people:

- Udayanga Weeratunga, Sri Lankan businessman
- Dulash Udayanga (born 1995), Sri Lankan cricketer
- Imesh Udayanga (born 1990), Sri Lankan cricketer
