= Gayan de Silva (Sri Lankan cricketer, born 1990) =

Sri Lankan cricketer

Personal information
- Full name: Gaardiya Punchi Hewage Gayan Sanjeewa de Silva
- Born: 5 January 1990 (age 36); Gampaha, Sri Lanka
- Batting: Right-handed
- Bowling: Right-arm medium-fast
- Source: ESPN Cricinfo, 16 July 2020

Gayan de Silva (born 5 January 1990) is a Sri Lankan cricketer. He made his first-class debut for Sri Lanka Navy Sports Club in Tier B of the 2019–20 Premier League Tournament on 14 February 2020. He made his List A debut for Sri Lanka Navy Sports Club in the 2019–20 Invitation Limited Over Tournament on 14 December 2019.
