= Nisar Ahmad (cricketer) =

Pakistani cricketer (born 1995)

Personal information
- Born: 5 August 1995 (age 31); Lahore, Pakistan
- Batting: Right-handed
- Bowling: Right-arm fast-medium
- Role: Bowler

Domestic team information
- Years: Team
- 2026-present: Islamabad United
- Source: Cricinfo, 4 January 2020

Nisar Ahmad (born 5 August 1995) is a Pakistani cricketer. He made his List A debut on 14 December 2019, for Police Sports Club in the 2019–20 Invitation Limited Over Tournament in Sri Lanka. He made his Twenty20 debut on 4 January 2020, for Police Sports Club in the 2019–20 SLC Twenty20 Tournament. He made his first-class debut on 31 January 2020, for Police Sports Club in Tier B of the 2019–20 Premier League Tournament.
