= Thisara =

Thisara is a Sinhalese given name, from Sri Lanka. It means “Swan”, which is a symbol of cleanliness and purity. Notable people with the name include:

- Thisara Dilshan (born 2000), Sri Lankan cricketer
- Thisara Perera (born 1989), Sri Lankan cricketer
- Thisara Samarasinghe (born 1955), Commander of the Sri Lankan Navy
