= Sameen =

Sameen is a given name. Notable people with the name include:

- Sameen Gul (born 1999), Pakistani cricketer
- Sameen Kandanearachchi (born 1988), Sri Lankan cricketer
