= Priyadharshana =

Priyadharshana is a surname. Notable people with the surname include:

- Damith Priyadharshana (born 1993), Sri Lankan cricketer
- Sanjeewan Priyadharshana (born 1997), Sri Lankan cricketer

== See also ==
- Anura Priyadharshana Yapa (born 1959), Sri Lankan politician
