= Malith de Silva =

Malith de Silva can refer to:

- Malith de Silva (cricketer, born 1992), Sri Lankan cricketer
- Malith de Silva (cricketer, born 1995), Sri Lankan cricketer
