= Raigamacharige Nilanjana =

Sri Lankan cricketer (born 1975)

Raigamacharige Nilanjana (born March 20, 1975) was a Sri Lankan cricketer. He was a left-handed batsman and leg-break bowler who played for Kalutara Town Club. He was born in Colombo.

Nilanjana made seven appearances for the team during the 1996-97 Saravanamuttu Trophy campaign, Kalutara's only season in first-class cricket. Debuting in their first match from the upper-middle order, Nilanjana was quickly placed lower down the order as he was unable to partner teammate Saman Fonseka effectively.

At no point a frequent bowler within the team, Nilanjana bowled just nine overs in his first-class career, which stretched to seven matches of the team's thirteen, none of which ended in victory.
