= Sanjula =

Sanjula is a given name and surname. Notable people with the name include:

- Sanjula Abeywickreme (born 1999), Sri Lankan cricketer
- Sanjula Naik (born 1996), Goan cricketer
- Iwanka Sanjula (born 1997), Sri Lankan cricketer
- Krishan Sanjula (born 1998), Sri Lankan cricketer
