= Shalith Fernando =

Sri Lankan cricketer (born 1999)

Personal information
- Born: 23 August 1999 (age 27)
- Source: Cricinfo, 13 July 2020

Shalith Fernando (born 23 August 1999) is a Sri Lankan cricketer. He made his first-class debut for Sri Lanka Navy Sports Club in Tier B of the 2018–19 Premier League Tournament on 22 March 2019.
