= Sawan Kankanamge =

Sri Lankan cricketer (born 1999)

Personal information
- Born: 18 February 1999 (age 27)
- Source: Cricinfo, 18 February 2019

Sawan Kankanamge (born 18 February 1999) is a Sri Lankan cricketer. He made his first-class debut for Lankan Cricket Club in Tier B of the 2018–19 Premier League Tournament on 31 January 2019. He made his List A debut for Lankan Cricket Club in the 2018–19 Premier Limited Overs Tournament on 4 March 2019.
