= Jiniv Joshi =

Indian cricketer (born 1987)

Personal information
- Born: 30 October 1987; Mumbai, India
- Source: ESPNcricinfo, 14 July 2020

Jiniv Joshi (born 30 October 1987) is an Indian cricketer. He made his first-class debut for Sebastianites Cricket and Athletic Club in Tier B of the 2019–20 Premier League Tournament in Sri Lanka on 31 January 2020.
