= Hiruna Sigera =

Sri Lankan cricketer (born 1999)

Personal information
- Born: 25 May 1999 (age 27)
- Source: Cricinfo, 13 July 2020

Hiruna Sigera (born 25 May 1999) is a Sri Lankan cricketer. He made his first-class debut for Lankan Cricket Club in Tier B of the 2018–19 Premier League Tournament on 10 February 2019.
