= Savindu Peiris =

Sri Lankan cricketer (born 1998)

Personal information
- Born: 16 October 1998 (age 28); Moratuwa, Sri Lanka
- Batting: Left-handed
- Bowling: Right-arm off break
- Source: Cricinfo, 13 July 2020

Savindu Peiris (born 16 October 1998) is a Sri Lankan cricketer. He made his first-class debut for Sri Lanka Navy Sports Club in Tier B of the 2018–19 Premier League Tournament on 22 March 2019.
