= Sandeep Kunchikor =

Indian cricketer (born 1984)

Personal information
- Full name: Sandeep Annappa Kunchikor
- Born: 12 March 1984 (age 42); Mumbai, India
- Batting: Right-handed
- Bowling: Slow left arm orthodox
- Source: Cricinfo, 14 July 2020

Sandeep Kunchikor (born 12 March 1984) is an Indian cricketer. He made his first-class debut for Kurunegala Youth Cricket Club in Tier B of the 2019–20 Premier League Tournament in Sri Lanka on 31 January 2020.
