= Kumar Boresa =

Indian cricketer (born 1995)

Personal information
- Full name: Kumar Boresa
- Born: 25 August 1995 (age 31); Rajasthan, India
- Batting: Right-handed
- Bowling: Slow left arm orthodox
- Source: ESPNcricinfo, 14 July 2020

Kumar Boresa (born 25 August 1995) is an Indian cricketer. He made his first-class debut for Sebastianites Cricket and Athletic Club in Tier B of the 2019–20 Premier League Tournament in Sri Lanka on 31 January 2020.
