= Asantha Singappulige =

Sri Lankan cricketer (born 1992)

Personal information
- Full name: Singappuli Arachchige Asantha Sampath Singappulige
- Born: 28 July 1992 (age 34); Colombo, Sri Lanka
- Source: CricketArchive, 6 April 2017

Singappuli Arachchige Asantha Sampath Singappulige (born 28 July 1992) is a Sri Lankan cricketer. He made his List A debut for Polonnaruwa District in the 2016–17 Districts One Day Tournament on 25 March 2017. He made his Twenty20 debut for Sri Lanka Police Sports Club in the 2017–18 SLC Twenty20 Tournament on 25 February 2018.
