= Karan Nande =

Indian cricketer (born 1987)

Personal information
- Born: 7 January 1987 (age 39)
- Source: ESPNcricinfo, 4 March 2019

Karan Nande (born 7 January 1987) is an Indian cricketer. He made his List A debut for Chilaw Marians Cricket Club in the 2018–19 Premier Limited Overs Tournament on 4 March 2019. He made his first-class debut on 14 February 2020, for Sebastianites Cricket and Athletic Club in Tier B of the 2019–20 Premier League Tournament.
