= Hashan Vimukthi =

Sri Lankan cricketer (born 1997)

Personal information
- Born: 3 July 1997 (age 29)
- Source: Cricinfo, 10 January 2020

Hashan Vimukthi (born 3 July 1997) is a Sri Lankan cricketer. He made his first-class debut on 21 May 2019, for Sri Lanka Air Force Sports Club in the 2018–19 Premier League Tournament Tier B. He made his Twenty20 debut on 10 January 2020, again for Sri Lanka Air Force Sports Club, in the 2019–20 SLC Twenty20 Tournament.
