= Sachika Udara =

Sri Lankan cricketer (born 1995)

Personal information
- Born: 10 September 1995 (age 31)
- Source: Cricinfo, 13 July 2020

Sachika Udara (born 10 September 1995) is a Sri Lankan cricketer. He made his first-class debut for Sri Lanka Air Force Sports Club in Tier B of the 2018–19 Premier League Tournament on 1 February 2019.
