= Thilanka de Silva =

Sri Lankan cricketer (born 1997)

Personal information
- Born: 19 May 1997 (age 29)
- Source: Cricinfo, 14 July 2020

Thilanka de Silva (born 19 May 1997) is a Sri Lankan cricketer. He made his first-class debut for Sebastianites Cricket and Athletic Club in Tier B of the 2019–20 Premier League Tournament on 31 January 2020.
