= Kavika Dilshan =

Sri Lankan cricketer (born 2000)

Personal information
- Born: 18 February 2000 (age 26)
- Source: Cricinfo, 16 December 2019

Kavika Dilshan (born 18 February 2000) is a Sri Lankan cricketer. He made his first-class debut for Sri Lanka Navy Sports Club in Tier B of the 2018–19 Premier League Tournament on 31 January 2019. He made his List A debut on 16 December 2019, for Galle Cricket Club in the 2019–20 Invitation Limited Over Tournament.
