= Vishal Amugoda =

Sri Lankan cricketer (born 1996)

Personal information
- Born: 20 June 1996 (age 30); Colombo, Sri Lanka
- Source: Cricinfo, 13 July 2020

Vishal Amugoda (born 20 June 1996) is a Sri Lankan cricketer. He made his first-class debut for Kalutara Town Club in Tier B of the 2018–19 Premier League Tournament on 1 April 2019.
