= Lahiru Kumara (cricketer, born 1995) =

Sri Lankan cricketer (born 1995)

Personal information
- Born: 7 December 1995 (age 30)
- Source: Cricinfo, 13 July 2020

Lahiru Kumara (born 7 December 1995) is a Sri Lankan cricketer. He made his first-class debut for Sri Lanka Air Force Sports Club in Tier B of the 2018–19 Premier League Tournament on 21 May 2019.
