= Sameera Gunaratne =

Sri Lankan cricketer (born 1996)

Personal information
- Born: 12 February 1996 (age 30)
- Source: Cricinfo, 15 December 2019

Sameera Gunaratne (born 12 February 1996) is a Sri Lankan cricketer. He made his List A debut on 15 December 2019, for Nugegoda Sports and Welfare Club in the 2019–20 Invitation Limited Over Tournament. He made his first-class debut on 14 February 2020, for Nugegoda Sports and Welfare Club in Tier B of the 2019–20 Premier League Tournament.
