= Sanka Chathuranga =

Sri Lankan cricketer (born 1996)

Personal information
- Full name: Mihindu Kula Warna Palige Sanka Chathuranga
- Born: 16 February 1996 (age 30); Nagoda
- Batting: Right-handed
- Source: Cricinfo, 15 July 2020

Sanka Chathuranga (born 16 February 1996) is a Sri Lankan cricketer. He made his first-class debut on 13 March 2020, for Kalutara Town Club in Tier B of the 2019–20 Premier League Tournament.
