= Geethal Malinda =

Sri Lankan cricketer (born 1997)

Personal information
- Born: 2 April 1997 (age 29); Chilaw, Sri Lanka
- Source: Cricinfo, 13 July 2020

Geethal Malinda (born 2 April 1997) is a Sri Lankan cricketer. He made his first-class debut for Kalutara Town Club in Tier B of the 2018–19 Premier League Tournament on 27 March 2019.
