= Shewon Fonseka =

Sri Lankan cricketer (born 1998)

Personal information
- Born: 9 July 1998 (age 28)
- Source: Cricinfo, 11 July 2020

Shewon Fonseka (born 9 July 1998) is a Sri Lankan cricketer. He made his first-class debut for Sri Lanka Navy Sports Club in Tier B of the 2018–19 Premier League Tournament on 31 January 2019. He made his List A debut for Sri Lanka Navy Sports Club in the 2018–19 Premier Limited Overs Tournament on 8 March 2019.
