= Naveen Gunawardene =

Sri Lankan cricketer (born 1998)

Personal information
- Full name: Dalugama Mudiyanselage Naveen Dilshan Gunawardene
- Born: 20 May 1998 (age 28)
- Source: Cricinfo, 14 July 2020

Dalugama Mudiyanselage Naveen Dilshan Gunawardene (born 20 May 1998) is a Sri Lankan cricketer. He made his first-class debut for Sebastianites Cricket and Athletic Club in Tier B of the 2019–20 Premier League Tournament on 6 February 2020. He made his List A debut for Chilaw Marians Cricket Club in the 2017–18 Premier Limited Overs Tournament on 12 March 2018. He made his Twenty20 debut on 4 March 2021, for Kurunegala Youth Cricket Club in the 2020–21 SLC Twenty20 Tournament.
