= Risira Weerasuriya =

Sri Lankan cricketer (born 2000)

Personal information
- Born: 28 August 2000 (age 26); Matara, Sri Lanka
- Batting: Right-handed

Domestic team information
- Years: Team
- 2020-present: Sri Lanka Air Force Sports Club
- Source: Cricinfo, 14 July 2020

Risira Weerasuriya (born 28 August 2000) is a Sri Lankan cricketer. He made his first-class debut on 31 January 2020, for Sri Lanka Air Force Sports Club in Tier B of the 2019–20 Premier League Tournament. He made his Twenty20 debut on 10 March 2021, for Chilaw Marians Cricket Club in the 2020–21 SLC Twenty20 Tournament.
