= Pramodh Kumara =

Sri Lankan cricketer (born 1995)

Personal information
- Full name: Ginige Pramodh Chathuranga Kumara
- Born: 20 July 1995 (age 31); Mahamodara, Sri Lanka
- Batting: Right-handed
- Bowling: Slow left arm orthodox
- Source: Cricinfo, 4 January 2020

Pramodh Kumara (born 20 July 1995) is a Sri Lankan cricketer. He made his Twenty20 debut on 4 January 2020, for Sri Lanka Air Force Sports Club in the 2019–20 SLC Twenty20 Tournament. He made his first-class debut on 31 January 2020, for Sri Lanka Air Force Sports Club in Tier B of the 2019–20 Premier League Tournament.
