= Navodya Imesh =

Sri Lankan cricketer (born 2000)

Personal information
- Full name: Ekanayake Mudiyanselage Nawodya Imesh Wijayakumara
- Born: 26 March 2000 (age 26)
- Source: Cricinfo, 3 April 2021

Ekanayake Mudiyanselage Nawodya Imesh Wijayakumara (born 26 March 2000) is a Sri Lankan cricketer. He made his first-class debut on 14 February 2020, for Sebastianites Cricket and Athletic Club in the 2019–20 Premier League Tournament Tier B. He made his List A debut on 3 April 2021, for Ace Capital Cricket Club in the 2020–21 Major Clubs Limited Over Tournament.
