= Chandima Vijaya Bandara =

Sri Lankan cricketer (born 1995)

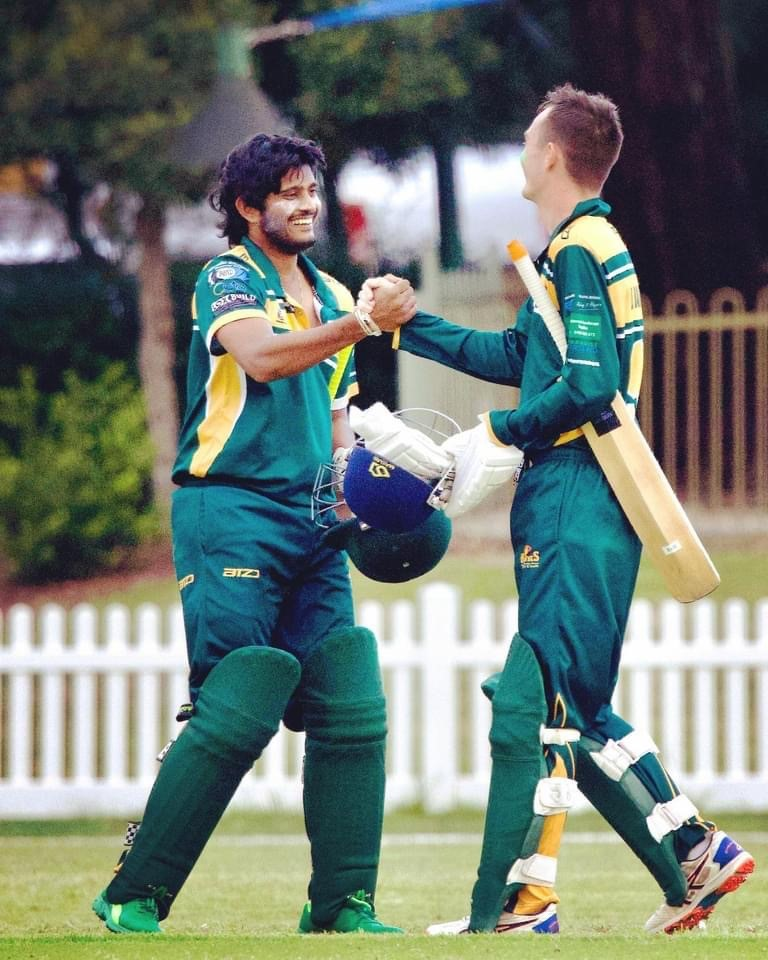

Personal information
- Born: 27 April 1995 (age 31)
- Source: Cricinfo, 13 July 2020

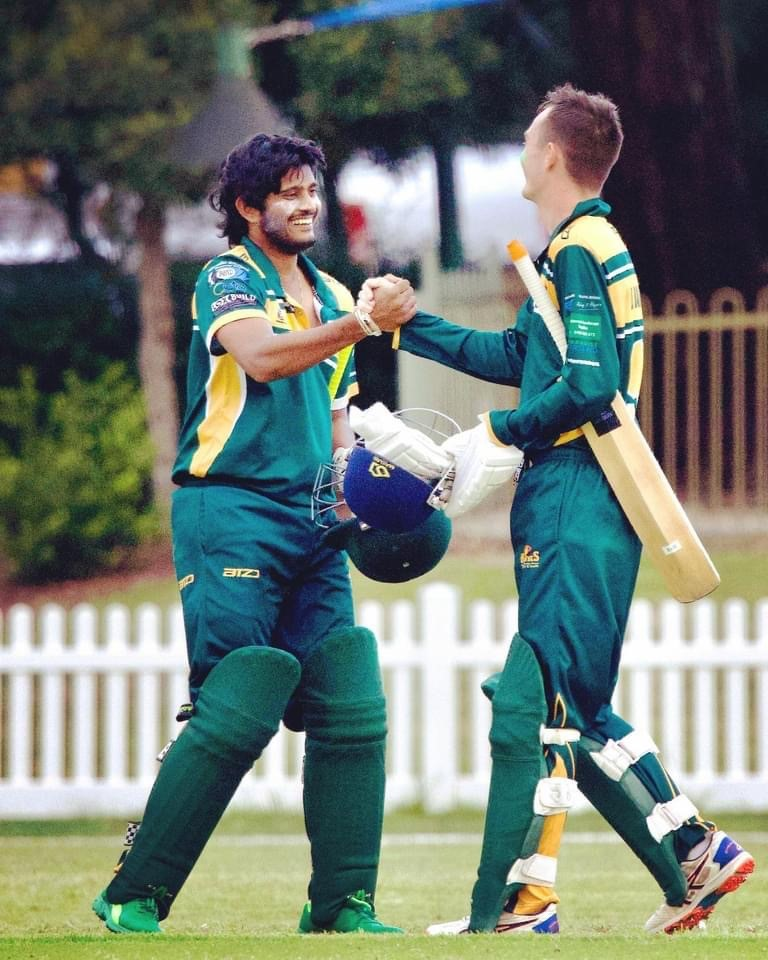
Chandima Bandara

Chandima Vijaya Bandara (born 27 April 1995) is a Sri Lankan cricketer. He made his first-class debut for Kurunegala Youth Cricket Club in Tier B of the 2018–19 Premier League Tournament on 1 April 2019.
