= Joseph Fernando =

Sri Lankan cricketer (born 1995)

Personal information
- Full name: Warnakulasuriya Joseph Atkinson Fernando
- Born: 1 May 1995 (age 31); Negombo, Sri Lanka
- Role: All-rounder
- Source: Cricinfo, 6 December 2021

Joseph Fernando (born 1 May 1995) is a Sri Lankan cricketer. He made his first-class debut for Panadura Sports Club in Tier B of the 2018–19 Premier League Tournament on 9 May 2019.
