= Navy Ground, Welisara =

Cricket ground

Coordinates: 7°1′8.45″N 79°54′13.29″E

Navy Ground
Ground information
- Location: Welisara, Sri Lanka
- Establishment: 2002 (first recorded match)
- End names
- Academy End; Ragama Road End

Team information
Sri Lanka Navy Sports Club	(2009–present)
- As of 4 November 2011; Source: Ground profile

Navy Ground is a cricket ground in Welisara, Sri Lanka. The first recorded match held on the ground came in 2002 when Galle Cricket Club Under-23s played Nugegoda Sports and Welfare Club Under-23s.

First-class cricket was first played there in 2006 when Burgher Recreation Club played Saracens Sports Club in the 2006/07 Premier Trophy. To date twenty first-class matches have been held there, though home side Sri Lanka Navy Sports Club didn't start playing there until the 2009/10 season. The first List A was held there in the 2006/07 Premier Limited Overs Tournament when Kurunegala Youth Cricket Club played Sri Lanka Army Sports Club. To date, ten List A matches have been played there.
