= Dilanka Auwardt =

Sri Lankan cricketer (born 1990)

Personal information
- Full name: Dilanka Srimal Auwardt
- Born: 27 August 1990 (age 36); Kurunegala, Sri Lanka
- Batting: Right-handed
- Bowling: Slow left arm orthodox
- Source: Cricinfo, 19 December 2019

Dilanka Auwardt (born 27 August 1990) is a Sri Lankan cricketer. He made his first-class debut on 2 March 2012, for Police Sports Club in the 2011–12 Premier Trophy.
