= Pathum Madusanka =

Sri Lankan cricketer (born 1996)

Personal information
- Full name: Wickramasinghe Arachchige Don Pathum Madusanka
- Born: 13 January 1996 (age 30); Colombo, Sri Lanka
- Source: ESPNcricinfo, 28 January 2017

Pathum Madusanka (born 13 January 1996) is a Sri Lankan cricketer. He made his first-class debut for Badureliya Sports Club in the 2015–16 Premier League Tournament on 4 December 2015. He made his Twenty20 debut for Badureliya Sports Club on 15 February 2019.
