= Kasun Abeyrathne =

Sri Lankan cricketer (born 1998)

Personal information
- Full name: Abeygoda Liyanage Kasun Lakruwan Abeyrathne
- Born: 7 August 1998 (age 28); Ragama, Sri Lanka
- Batting: Right-handed
- Source: Cricinfo, 2 March 2018

Kasun Abeyrathne (born 7 August 1998) is a Sri Lankan cricketer. He made his Twenty20 debut for Sri Lanka Air Force Sports Club in the 2017–18 SLC Twenty20 Tournament on 1 March 2018. He made his List A debut for Bloomfield Cricket and Athletic Club in the 2018–19 Premier Limited Overs Tournament on 4 March 2019.
