= Lionel de Fonseka =

Lionel de Fonseka or Fonseka-Varnasuriya (born 27 October 1889) was a Sinhalese writer and art critic, best known for On the Truth of Decorative Art (1912).

== Life ==
Lionel de Fonseka was educated at Royal College, Colombo and Oxford University, where he knew Alain Locke. De la Verité dans l'art - subsequently translated into English as On the Truth of Decorative Art (1912) - argued against the corruption of Sinhalese art by Western influence:

Sinhalese art has hitherto been strictly decorative; and as a Sinhalese I view with regret the modern tendency in Ceylon, under Western influences, to abandon our traditions in art and in life. It seems to me that Eastern peoples need to realize at the least that art, education, civilization, admit of a plural; also that what is fortuitously predominant is not necessarily intrinsically excellent. It is regrettable that the rise of Western commerce should involve the decline of Eastern art; but though regrettable, it is not inevitable.

In his text, Fonseka argued for the inherent superiority of 'Eastern' over 'Western' art, owing to its use of symbolic form as a reflection of a larger civilisation rather than an individual artist. According to his nephew, de Fonseka wrote the book "primarily to satisfy his father, that he was using his time to good purpose". However, the book is said to have influenced Ananda Coomaraswamy, Eric Gill and Romain Rolland.

In April 1913 Fonseka, Arthur Ransome, Coomaraswamy, Anthony Ludovici and Lascelles Abercrombie entered into controversy in the Academy over who had priority in using the phrase "Art for life's sake". De Fonseka entered into fashionable London life, attending a King's Levée at Buckingham Palace on 3 June 1913.

De Fonseka subsequently lived and worked in France and Belgium for over a decade. He donated a gold chalice to Bruges Cathedral. After a pilgrimage to Fátima, Portugal, he wrote an account of the Marian apparitions believed to have taken place at Cova da Iria.

Working as a barrister in Ceylon, Fonseka was a contributor to the Daily News there, as well as writing a weekly column for the Ceylon Catholic Messenger.

== Works ==
- De la verité dans l'art, Paris, 1912. Translated as On the Truth of Decorative Art: A Dialogue between an Oriental and an Occidental, London: Greening, 1912. Published with an introduction by Ananda Coomaraswamy in 1913.
- 'China Sunday!', The New Age, vol. 13, no. 1 (1 May 1913), p. 9.
- 'Futurism in Food', The New Age, vol. 13. no. 6 (5 June 1913), pp. 148–149.
- 'The White Dancer', The New Age, vol. 14. no. 3 (20 November 1913), pp. 76–78.
- 'A Thinking Man', The New Age, vol. 14. no. 8 (25 December 1913), pp. 238–9.
- 'War and the Aesthete', The New Age, vol. 16, no. 9 (31 December 1914), pp. 216–17.
- 'The Karave Flag', Ceylon Antiquary and Literary Register, Vol. Ill, Part I (July, 1921), pp. 1–11.
- Les eaux de lumière: dialogue entre un Oriental et un Occidental (The waters of life: dialogue between an oriental and an occidental), Monaco: Éditions de Fontvieille, 1953.
