= Bhavani Fonseka =

Sri Lankan lawyer

- Education: University of Bristol, University of Denver, Harvard University
- Occupations: lawyer, human rights activist

Bhavani Fonseka is a constitutional lawyer and a prominent human rights lawyer and activist in Sri Lanka. She is a researcher and attorney at law in the Centre for Policy Alternatives. She is a member of the policy committee of Human Rights Watch. She is a member of the Subcommittee on Business and Human Rights at the Human Rights Commission of Sri Lanka and was involved in the drafting of the first guideline on business and human rights in Sri Lanka.

She was an advisor to the Consultation Task-force on human Rights and member to formulate the National Human Rights Action Plan in Sri Lanka. She is counsel in cases in the Supreme Court of Sri Lanka.

She is on the Editorial Boards of The International Journal of Transitional Justice and The Women, Peace & Security Series- De Gruyter Press

She has written extensively on human rights and justice issues and is the editor of Transitional Justice in Sri Lanka: Moving Beyond Promises (2017) & Elusive Justice & Emblematic Cases in Sri Lanka (2023). She is the co-editor of the book Salient Aspects of Public Interest Litigation Jurisprudence in Sri Lanka (2023).

She earned her bachelor's degree in law from the University of Bristol and her masters in law from the Denver University and masters in public administration from Harvard University.

Fonseka was a Mason Fellow at the Harvard Kennedy School for the period 2013-2014. In 2015 she was selected to participate in the 2nd Women's Leadership Program Eisenhower Fellows. She was a Tedx Speaker in 2024
