= Geeth Kumara =

Sri Lankan cricketer (born 1988)

Personal information
- Full name: Hirimutungodage Geeth Kumara
- Born: 15 May 1988 (age 38); Colombo, Sri Lanka
- Source: Cricinfo, 17 March 2017

Geeth Kumara (born 15 May 1988) is a Sri Lankan cricketer. He made his first-class debut for Seeduwa Raddoluwa Cricket Club in the 2008–09 Premier Trophy on 14 November 2008. Geeth is also the club professional of Lancashire League team - Colne Cricket Club where he has also resigned for the 2023 season.
