= Supun Leelaratne =

Sri Lankan cricketer (born 1981)

Personal information
- Full name: Supunsara Leelaratne
- Born: 27 May 1981 (age 45); Colombo, Sri Lanka
- Batting: Right-handed
- Bowling: Right-arm off break
- Source: Cricinfo, 27 February 2018

Supun Leelaratne (born 27 May 1981) is a Sri Lankan cricketer. He made his Twenty20 debut for Sri Lanka Navy Sports Club in the 2017–18 SLC Twenty20 Tournament on 25 February 2018.
