= Sri Lanka Police Sports Club (cricket) =

Cricket team

Police Sports Club
Personnel
- Captain: Chamara Silva

Team information
- Colours: Black

Police Sports Club is a cricket team in Sri Lanka that has played first-class cricket since the 1995–96 season.

== Home ground ==
Police Sports Club's home ground is Police Park Ground in Colombo. The ground has hosted cricket matches since 1973 and is a regular first-class venue. The ground also hosted four Youth ODI matches in 2000 and 2007 and a Youth Test in 2007.

== Current squad ==
Players with international caps are listed in bold. Updated as of 23 July 2022

Name	Age	Batting style	Bowling style	Notes
Batsmen
**Chamara Silva**	46	Right-handed	Right-arm leg spin	Captain
Heshan Dhanushka	27	Left-handed	Right-arm off spin	
Chathuranga Jayathilake	34	Left-handed	Right-arm off spin	
Dulash Udayanga	31	Right-handed	Right-arm off spin	
**Ashen Bandara**	27	Right-handed	Right-arm leg spin	
All-rounders
Nadeera Balasooriya	26	Right-handed	Right-arm off spin	
Chathuranga Kumara	34	Right-handed	Right-arm fast-medium	
Randunu Ganganath	22	Right-handed	Right-arm medium-fast	
Supun Madhushanka	32	Left-handed	Right-arm leg spin	
Malith de Silva	34	Left-handed	Right-arm off spin	
Wicket-keepers
Dilhara Polgampola	26	Left-handed	-	
Maduranga Zoysa	41	Right-handed	-	Vice-captain
Saman Kumara	40	Right-handed	-	
Gitansh Khera	34	Right-handed	-	(India) Overseas Player
Lahiru Attanayake	26	Right-handed	-	
Spin Bowlers
Nalin Priyadarshana	35	Right-handed	Right-arm off spin	
Lahiru Diyantha	36	Left-handed	Slow left-arm orthodox	
Charith Sudaraka	30	Right-handed	Slow left-arm orthodox	
Manjula Jayawardene	43	Right-handed	Right-arm off spin	
Chathura Randunu	42	Left-handed	Slow left-arm orthodox	
Pace Bowlers
**Nuwan Pradeep**	39	Right-handed	Right-arm fast-medium	
Charuka Jayathilake	24	Right-handed	Left-arm medium	

== See also ==
- List of Sri Lankan cricket teams
