= Ragon Perera =

Sri Lankan cricketer (born 1985)

Personal information
- Born: 19 May 1985 (age 41)
- Source: Cricinfo, 13 July 2020

Ragon Perera (born 19 May 1985) is a Sri Lankan cricketer. He made his first-class debut for Panadura Sports Club in Tier B of the 2018–19 Premier League Tournament on 9 May 2019.
