= Geeshat Panditharatne =

Sri Lankan cricketer (born 1996)

Personal information
- Born: 9 October 1996 (age 30)
- Source: Cricinfo, 4 March 2019

Geeshat Panditharatne (born 9 October 1996) is a Sri Lankan cricketer. He made his List A debut for Bloomfield Cricket and Athletic Club in the 2018–19 Premier Limited Overs Tournament on 4 March 2019. He made his first-class debut for Bloomfield Cricket and Athletic Club in Tier B of the 2018–19 Premier League Tournament on 11 February 2019.
