= Saranga Rajaguru =

Sri Lankan cricketer (born 1992)

Personal information
- Born: 12 November 1992 (age 34)
- Source: Cricinfo, 14 March 2018

Saranga Rajaguru (born 12 November 1992) is a Sri Lankan cricketer. He made his first-class debut for Nondescripts Cricket Club in the 2013–14 Premier Trophy on 31 January 2014. Prior to his first-class debut, he was part of Sri Lanka's squad for the 2010 Under-19 Cricket World Cup.
