= Sanjula Abeywickreme =

Sri Lankan cricketer (born 1999)

Personal information
- Born: 13 February 1999 (age 27); Colombo, Sri Lanka
- Source: Cricinfo, 9 April 2017

Sanjula Abeywickreme (born 13 February 1999) is a Sri Lankan cricketer. He made his List A debut for Ratnapura District in the 2016–17 Districts One Day Tournament on 22 March 2017. He made his first-class debut for Lankan Cricket Club in Tier B of the 2018–19 Premier League Tournament on 10 February 2019.
