= Thisara Dilshan =

Sri Lankan cricketer (born 2000)

Personal information
- Born: 8 February 2000 (age 26)
- Source: Cricinfo, 8 January 2020

Thisara Dilshan (born 8 February 2000) is a Sri Lankan cricketer. He made his Twenty20 debut on 8 January 2020, for Galle Cricket Club in the 2019–20 SLC Twenty20 Tournament. He made his first-class debut on 7 February 2020, for Galle Cricket Club in Tier B of the 2019–20 Premier League Tournament. He made his List A debut on 24 March 2021, for Galle Cricket Club in the 2020–21 Major Clubs Limited Over Tournament.
