= Nishant Kantawala =

Cricketer (born 1996)

Personal information
- Full name: Nishant Kantawala
- Born: 15 October 1996 (age 30); New Delhi
- Batting: Right-handed
- Bowling: Right-arm off break
- Source: ESPNcricinfo, 15 July 2020

Nishant Kantawala (born 15 October 1996) is an Indian cricketer. He made his first-class debut on 13 March 2020, for Galle Cricket Club in Tier B of the 2019–20 Premier League Tournament.
