= Chanuk Dilshan =

Sri Lankan cricketer (born 1996)

Personal information
- Born: 7 November 1996 (age 30)
- Source: Cricinfo, 19 February 2019

Chanuk Dilshan (born 7 November 1996) is a Sri Lankan cricketer. He made his first-class debut for Moors Sports Club in the 2017–18 Premier League Tournament on 7 February 2018. He made his Twenty20 debut for Moors Sports Club in the 2017–18 SLC Twenty20 Tournament on 2 March 2018. He made his List A debut for Moors Sports Club in the 2017–18 Premier Limited Overs Tournament on 14 March 2018.
