= Malith de Silva (cricketer, born 1992) =

Sri Lankan cricketer (born 1992)

Personal information
- Full name: Malith de Silva
- Born: 26 March 1992 (age 34); Kurunegala
- Batting: Left-handed
- Bowling: Right-arm off break
- Source: ESPNcricinfo, 14 July 2020

Malith de Silva (born 26 March 1992) is a Sri Lankan cricketer. He made his List A debut for Sri Lanka Police Sports Club in the 2019–20 Invitation Limited Over Tournament on 23 December 2019. He made his Twenty20 debut for Police Sports Club in the 2019–20 SLC Twenty20 Tournament on 4 January 2020. He made his first-class debut for Police Sports Club in Tier B of the 2019–20 Premier League Tournament on 19 February 2020.
