= Lahiru Diyantha =

Sri Lankan cricketer (born 1989)

Personal information
- Born: 28 June 1989 (age 37)
- Source: Cricinfo, 19 December 2019

Lahiru Diyantha (born 28 June 1989) is a Sri Lankan cricketer. He made his first-class debut on 16 March 2012, for Police Sports Club in the 2011–12 Premier Trophy.
