= Kavindu Ediriweera =

Sri Lankan cricketer (born 1999)

Personal information
- Full name: Kaluwa Handi Kavindu Ediriweera
- Born: 8 July 1999 (age 27); Galle, Sri Lanka
- Batting: Left-handed
- Bowling: Right-arm off break
- Source: Cricinfo, 16 December 2019

Kavindu Ediriweera (born 8 July 1999) is a Sri Lankan cricketer. He made his List A debut on 16 December 2019, for Galle Cricket Club in the 2019–20 Invitation Limited Over Tournament. He made his Twenty20 debut on 4 January 2020, for Galle Cricket Club in the 2019–20 SLC Twenty20 Tournament. He made his first-class debut on 31 January 2020, for Galle Cricket Club in Tier B of the 2019–20 Premier League Tournament.
