= Lasindu Nimsara =

Sri Lankan cricketer (born 1994)

Personal information
- Born: 17 February 1994 (age 32)
- Source: Cricinfo, 14 January 2020

Lasindu Nimsara (born 17 February 1994) is a Sri Lankan cricketer. He made his Twenty20 debut on 14 January 2020, for Kandy Customs Cricket Club in the 2019–20 SLC Twenty20 Tournament. He made his first-class debut on 28 February 2020, for Kandy Customs Cricket Club in Tier B of the 2019–20 Premier League Tournament.
