= Saman Kumara =

Sri Lankan cricketer (born 1988)

Personal information
- Born: 9 September 1988 (age 38)
- Source: Cricinfo, 14 July 2020

Saman Kumara (born 9 September 1988) is a Sri Lankan cricketer. He made his first-class debut for Sebastianites Cricket and Athletic Club in Tier B of the 2019–20 Premier League Tournament on 31 January 2020.
