= Kevin Peiris =

Sri Lankan cricketer (born 1999)

Personal information
- Born: 24 March 1999 (age 27)
- Source: Cricinfo, 16 February 2019

Kevin Peiris (born 24 March 1999) is a Sri Lankan cricketer. He made his Twenty20 debut for Bloomfield Cricket and Athletic Club in the 2018–19 SLC Twenty20 Tournament on 16 February 2019. He made his List A debut on 19 December 2019, for Kalutara Town Club in the 2019–20 Invitation Limited Over Tournament. He made his first-class debut on 31 January 2020, for Kalutara Town Club in Tier B of the 2019–20 Premier League Tournament.
