= Thimira Jayasinghe =

Sri Lankan cricketer (born 1996)

Personal information
- Full name: Thimira Lukshan Jayasinghe
- Born: 19 April 1996 (age 30); Colombo, Sri Lanka
- Source: ESPNcricinfo, 14 February 2017

Thimira Jayasinghe (born 19 April 1996) is a Sri Lankan cricketer. He made his first-class debut for Nondescripts Cricket Club in the 2015–16 Premier Trophy on 11 February 2016. He made his List A debut for Matara District in the 2016–17 Districts One Day Tournament on 29 March 2017. He made his Twenty20 debut for Panadura Sports Club in the 2018–19 SLC Twenty20 Tournament on 18 February 2019.
