= Ali Manzoor =

Pakistani cricketer (born 1993)

Personal information
- Born: 1 August 1993 (age 33); Lahore, Punjab, Pakistan
- Batting: Right-handed
- Bowling: Slow left arm orthodox
- Source: ESPNcricinfo, 1 November 2016

Ali Manzoor (born 1 August 1993) is a Pakistani cricketer. He made his first-class debut for Lahore cricket team in the 2011–12 Quaid-e-Azam Trophy on 6 October 2011.
