= Saman Fonseka =

Sri Lankan cricketer (born 1969)

Personal information
- Full name: Hewafonsekage Saman Surendra Fonseka
- Born: 8 September 1969 (age 57)
- Source: Cricinfo, 19 April 2021

Saman Fonseka (born 8 July 1969) is a Sri Lankan former cricketer. He played in 91 first-class and 13 List A matches between 1988/89 and 2001/02. After his playing career he became a cricket coach, becoming the head coach of a Sri Lankan expatriate team in Qatar.
