= Tharindu Perera (Sri Lankan cricketer) =

Sri Lankan cricketer (born 1988)

Personal information
- Full name: Kandanearachchige Sameen Tharindu Perera
- Born: 24 March 1988 (age 38); Colombo, Sri Lanka
- Batting: right-handed
- Bowling: off break
- Role: wicket-keeper

Domestic team information
- Years: Team
- 2008–2024: various (tbc)
- Source: CricketArchive, 7 September

Kandanearachchige Sameen Tharindu Perera (born 24 March 1988; known as Tharindu Perera) is a Sri Lankan cricketer.

== Debut ==
Perera made his first-class debut for Sri Lanka Air Force Sports Club in Tier B of the 2008–09 Premier League Tournament on 14 November 2008, playing against Panadura Sports Club at the Air Force Ground in Colombo. Panadura Sports Club won the match by an innings and 160 runs.

== Career ==
Besides the Air Force Sports Club, Perera has played for Moors Sports Club, Sinhalese Sports Club, Colombo Cricket Club, Badureliya Sports Club, Galle Cricket Club, Bloomfield Cricket and Athletic Club, Sebastianites Cricket and Athletic Club and Kandy Customs Sports Club. His career spanned the period from 2008 to 2024. He played in 67 first-class matches, 75 List A, and 30 Twenty20. In first-class cricket, he had a highest score of 130 (one of four centuries. A capable wicket-keeper, he held 107 catches and completed 32 stumpings.
