= Pasindu Madushan =

Sri Lankan cricketer (born 1992)

Personal information
- Born: 21 November 1992 (age 33)
- Source: Cricinfo, 24 February 2018

Pasindu Madushan (born 21 November 1992) is a Sri Lankan cricketer. He made his Twenty20 debut for Kalutara Town Club in the 2017–18 SLC Twenty20 Tournament on 24 February 2018.
