= Nipuna Deshan =

Sri Lankan cricketer (born 1999)

Personal information
- Born: 1 March 1999 (age 27)
- Source: Cricinfo, 10 March 2019

Nipuna Deshan (born 1 March 1999) is a Sri Lankan cricketer. He made his List A debut for Panadura Sports Club in the 2018–19 Premier Limited Overs Tournament on 10 March 2019.
