= Sachin Jayawardena =

Sri Lankan cricketer (born 1994)

Personal information
- Full name: Sachin Madusha Deshan Jayawardena
- Born: 12 November 1994 (age 32); Colombo, Sri Lanka
- Batting: Right-handed
- Bowling: Slow left arm orthodox
- Source: Cricinfo, 5 April 2017

Sachin Jayawardena (born 12 November 1994) is a Sri Lankan cricketer. He made his first-class debut for Bloomfield Cricket and Athletic Club against Badureliya in the 2013–14 Premier Trophy on 21 March 2014.
