= Harsha Vithana =

Sri Lankan cricketer (born 1985)

Harsha Eranga Vithana (born August 15, 1985) in Galle is a Sri Lankan first class cricketer. A right-handed batsman, he previously captained his country at the under-19 level. He made his Twenty20 debut on 17 August 2004, for Colts Cricket Club against Sri Lanka Air Force Sports Club in the 2004 SLC Twenty20 Tournament.
