= Geshan Wimaladharma =

Sri Lankan cricketer (born 1992)

Personal information
- Full name: Weliwitige Geshan Kavinda Wimaladharma
- Born: 9 September 1992 (age 34); Colombo, Sri Lanka
- Batting: Left-handed
- Bowling: Right-arm off break
- Source: Cricinfo, 15 July 2020

Geshan Wimaladharma (born 9 September 1992) is a Sri Lankan cricketer. He made his List A debut for Saracens Sports Club in the 2012–13 Premier Limited Overs Tournament on 9 December 2010. He made his first-class debut for Saracens Sports Club in the 2012–13 Premier League Tournament on 1 February 2013. He made his Twenty20 debut for Colombo Cricket Club in the 2014–15 SLC Twenty20 Tournament on 1 April 2015.
