= Sumudu Suranga =

Sri Lankan cricketer (born 1982)

Sumudu Suranga (born Munasinghe Abeywickreme Sumudu Suranga on 1 February 1982) is a Sri Lankan cricketer. He is a right-handed batsman and right-arm bowler who plays for Saracens Sports Club. He was born in Matara.

Suranga made his debut against Saracens Sports Club, against whom he scored a half century. In the same match, he took figures of 1-37 from 6 overs bowling - coincidentally, the same figures were achieved by fellow bowler Rakitha Wimaladarma.
