= Ravindu Sembukuttige =

Sri Lankan cricketer (born 1999)

Personal information
- Born: 22 March 1999 (age 27)
- Source: Cricinfo, 24 February 2018

Ravindu Sembukuttige (born 22 March 1999) is a Sri Lankan cricketer. He made his first-class debut for Galle Cricket Club in Tier B of the 2017–18 Premier League Tournament on 16 February 2018. He made his Twenty20 debut for Galle Cricket Club in the 2017–18 SLC Twenty20 Tournament on 24 February 2018. He made his List A debut for Galle Cricket Club in the 2017–18 Premier Limited Overs Tournament on 14 March 2018.
