= Sanjeewan Priyadharshana =

Sri Lankan cricketer (born 1997)

Personal information
- Born: 13 April 1997 (age 29)
- Source: Cricinfo, 8 March 2019

Sanjeewan Priyadharshana (born 13 April 1997) is a Sri Lankan cricketer. He made his List A debut for Kurunegala Youth Cricket Club in the 2018–19 Premier Limited Overs Tournament on 8 March 2019. He made his first-class debut for Kurunegala Youth Cricket Club in Tier B of the 2018–19 Premier League Tournament on 21 March 2019. He made his Twenty20 debut on 4 January 2020, for Kurunegala Youth Cricket Club in the 2019–20 SLC Twenty20 Tournament.
