= Suranga Perera =

Sri Lankan cricketer (born 1974)

Personal information
- Born: 28 December 1974 (age 51); Colombo, Sri Lanka
- Source: ESPNcricinfo, 5 February 2017

Suranga Perera (born 28 December 1974) is a Sri Lankan cricketer. He played forty first-class and six List A matches between 1994 and 2000. He his now an umpire and stood in matches in the 2016–17 Premier League Tournament.
