= Malinga Maligaspe =

Sri Lankan cricketer (born 1986)

Personal information
- Born: 20 June 1986 (age 40)
- Source: Cricinfo, 13 July 2020

Malinga Maligaspe (born 20 June 1986) is a Sri Lankan cricketer. He made his first-class debut for Burgher Recreation Club in Tier B of the 2008–09 Premier League Tournament on 14 November 2008.
