= Sumudu Atapattu =

Sri Lankan-American legal scholar

- Occupations: Legal scholar, professor

Academic background
- Education: Sri Lanka Law College (LLB); University of Cambridge (LLM, PhD)

Academic work
- Discipline: International human rights and environmental law
- Institutions: University of Wisconsin Law School
- Notable works: Exceptional Achievement Award, Sri Lanka Foundation, USA, 2012

Sumudu Anopama Atapattu is a Sri Lankan-American legal scholar in human rights, environmental and climate change law. She is a professor and program director at the University of Wisconsin Law School.

== Education ==
Atapattu completed her undergraduate studies as an attorney at the Sri Lanka Law College in Colombo, Sri Lanka. She went on to complete a Master of Law (LLM, First Class Honours) and a Doctor of Philosophy (PhD in International Environmental Law) under the supervision of Sir Christopher Greenwood GBE, QC, from the University of Cambridge.

== Career ==
Atapattu began her academic tenure as an associate professor at the Faculty of Law, University of Colombo, teaching international law and environmental law from 1995 to 2002. Concurrently, she worked as a Senior Research Consultant at The Law and Society Trust, and as a consultant for the Food and Agriculture Organization and United Nations Development Programme in Colombo. In 2000, she was appointed at a Fulbright Scholar, visiting both New York University School of Law and George Washington University Law School.

In 2003, Atapattu was appointed as a lecturer, later moving to associate director and finally director of research centers, at University of Wisconsin Law School. She was later appointed an affiliated professor at the Raoul Wallenberg Institute in Sweden, and lead counsel for human rights and poverty eradication at the Centre for International Sustainable Development Law.

She is also an active speaker on human rights and climate change issues. In 2012, Atapattu was awarded the Exceptional Achievement Award by the Sri Lanka Foundation for her contributions to human rights.

== Publications ==
- Legal Aspects of Implementing the Cartagena Protocol on Biosafety (Cambridge University Press, 2013)
- International Environmental Law, Environmental Justice, and the Global South Transnational Law & Contemporary Problems 26:2 (2017), with Carmen C. Gonzalez.
- Human Rights Approaches to Climate Change: Challenges and Opportunities (Routledge, 2015).
- International Environmental Law and the Global South (Cambridge University Press, 2015), editor with Shawkat Alam, Carmen C. Gonzalez, and Jona Razzaque.
- Emerging Principles of International Environmental Law (Transnational Publishers, 2006)
