= Hasnain Bokhari =

Pakistani cricketer (born 1991)

Personal information
- Born: 24 June 1991 (age 35)
- Source: Cricinfo, 30 September 2018

Hasnain Bokhari (born 24 June 1991) is a Pakistani cricketer. He made his first-class debut for Multan Tigers in the 2014–15 Quaid-e-Azam Trophy on 30 October 2014. He made his List A debut for Multan in the 2018–19 Quaid-e-Azam One Day Cup on 6 September 2018.
