= Manjula Jayawardene =

Sri Lankan cricketer (born 1983)

Personal information
- Born: 24 March 1983 (age 43)
- Source: Cricinfo, 5 April 2017

Manjula Jayawardene (born 24 March 1983) is a Sri Lankan cricketer. He made his first-class debut in the 2002–03 season, and has played 90 first-class matches.
