= Gitansh Khera =

Indian cricketer (born 1991)

Personal information
- Born: 4 June 1991 (age 35); Ludhiana, India
- Batting: Right-handed
- Role: Wicket-keeper

Domestic team information
- Years: Team
- 2010-2025: Punjab

Career statistics
Competition	FC	LA	T20
Matches	56	40	11
Runs scored	2,515	1,017	96
Batting average	33.98	44.21	19.20
100s/50s	3/15	3/3	0/0
Top score	164	167	37*
Catches/stumpings	140/25	55/12	7/7
- Source: Cricinfo, 13 October 2025

Gitansh Khera (born 4 June 1991) is an Indian cricketer who plays for Punjab. A wicketkeeper-batter, Khera made his T20 debut against Haryana in the 2010-11 Syed Mushtaq Ali Trophy. In the same season, he made his first-class debut, against Himachal Pradesh in the Ranji Trophy. He made his List A debut on 27 February 2014, in the 2013–14 Vijay Hazare Trophy. He has also played domestic cricket in Sri Lanka.

In 2026, he announced his retirement as a cricketer and moved into coaching. He was the assistant coach of Fazilka Falcons for the 2026 Sher-E-Punjab T20 League.
