= Dulash Udayanga =

Sri Lankan cricketer (born 1995)

Personal information
- Full name: Suraweera Arachchige Dulash Udayanga Mihiran
- Born: 23 April 1995 (age 31); Debarawewa, Sri Lanka
- Batting: Right-handed
- Bowling: Right-arm off break
- Source: Cricinfo, 15 March 2017

Dulash Udayanga (born 23 April 1995) is a Sri Lankan cricketer. He made his first-class debut for Galle Cricket Club in the 2015–16 Premier League Tournament on 11 December 2015.
