= Sri Lanka Navy Sports Club (cricket) =

Sri Lankan cricket team

Sri Lanka Navy Sports Club is a first-class cricket team in Sri Lanka. They played their debut first-class match against Nondescripts Cricket Club in January 2001.

The team is under the patronage of the Sri Lanka Navy.

== See also ==
- List of Sri Lankan cricket teams
