= Bangladeshi cricket team in the West Indies in 2009 =

Bangladeshi cricket team in West Indies in 2009
| | Bangladesh | West Indies |
- Dates: 3 July 2009 – 2 August 2009
| Captains | Mashrafe Mortaza (1st Test); Shakib Al Hasan | Floyd Reifer |

Test series
- Result: Bangladesh won the 2-match series 2–0
| Most runs | Tamim Iqbal (197) | David Bernard (191) |
| Most wickets | Shakib Al Hasan (13) | Kemar Roach (13) |
- Player of the series: Shakib Al Hasan (Ban)

One Day International series
- Results: Bangladesh won the 3-match series 3–0
| Most runs | Mohammad Ashraful (140) | Travis Dowlin (148) |
| Most wickets | Abdur Razzak 7 | Kemar Roach (10) |
- Player of the series: Shakib Al Hasan (Ban)

Twenty20 International series
- Results: West Indies won the 1-match series 1–0
| Most runs | Naeem Islam (27) | Devon Smith (37); Travis Dowlin (37) |
| Most wickets | Mohammad Ashraful (2) | Nikita Miller )2); Darren Sammy (2) |
- Player of the series: Darren Sammy (WI)

The Bangladesh cricket team toured the West Indies during the 2009 international season, from 3 July 2009 to 2 August 2009. The tour consisted of a two-Test series, a three-ODI series, and one Twenty20 International.

Due to industrial action between the West Indies Cricket Board and the West Indies Players' Association, the West Indies fielded a weak team which was missing its entire First XI during the series.

Bangladesh easily accounted for the weakened West Indian team, winning the Test series 2–0 and the ODI series 3–0. In the Test series, Bangladesh recorded only its second and third Test wins ever, its first and second Test wins as the touring side, its first series win as the touring side, and its first Test series whitewash. In the ODI series, it was also Bangladesh's first series win as the touring side against a Test nation, and its first series whitewash against a Test nation. The West Indies won the Twenty20 match.

== Squads ==
| Tests | | ODIs | |
| West Indies | Bangladesh | West Indies | Bangladesh |
|---|---|---|---|
| Chris Gayle (c); Denesh Ramdin (wk); Adrian Barath; Brendan Nash; Sulieman Benn; Dwayne Bravo; Shivnarine Chanderpaul; Narsingh Deonarine; Andrew Richardson; Ravi Rampaul; Ramnaresh Sarwan; Jerome Taylor; Runako Morton | ~~Mashrafe Mortaza~~ (c); Shakib Al Hasan (c) (Note: Due to Mashrafe Mortaza's injury Shakib captained the side in 2nd Test); Mohammad Ashraful; Tamim Iqbal; Junaid Siddique; Imrul Kayes; Raqibul Hasan; Mehrab Hossain; Mahmudullah; Mushfiqur Rahim (wk); Shahadat Hossain; Enamul Haque; Mahbubul Alam; Rubel Hossain; Saghir Hossain (wk) | Floyd Reifer (c); Darren Sammy; Ryan Austin; David Bernard; Tino Best; Kraigg Brathwaite; Andre Creary; Travis Dowlin; Kevin McClean; Nikita Miller; Nelon Pascal; Omar Phillips; Dale Richards; Kemar Roach; Chadwick Walton (wk) | Shakib Al Hasan (c); Mohammad Ashraful; Tamim Iqbal; Junaid Siddique; Imrul Kayes; Raqibul Hasan; Mehrab Hossain; Mahmudullah; Mushfiqur Rahim (wk); Shahadat Hossain; Enamul Haque; Mahbubul Alam; Rubel Hossain; Saghir Hossain (wk) |

- However, the dispute between the West Indies Cricket Board and the West Indies Players' Association saw the First XI go on strike. As such, an entirely new team was selected for the Test series. Not a single member of the new squad had played in the side's most recent Test match against England two months earlier, and nine of the fifteen players in the squad had never played a Test.
- in the 3rd day of First test Mashrafe Motaraza got injured in his knee and Shakib was stand in captain for the remaining days and the 2nd test.

== Test series ==
=== 1st Test ===
9–13 July
scorecard

| Bangladesh | v | West Indies |
| 238 (88.2 overs); Mashrafe Mortaza 39 (52); Kemar Roach 3/46 (23 overs) | | 307 (95.1 overs); Omar Phillips 94 (177); Mahmudullah 3/59 (19.4 overs) |
| 345 (120.1 overs); Tamim Iqbal 128 (243); Darren Sammy 5/70 (30.1 overs) | | 181 (70.1 overs); David Bernard 52* (134); Mahmudullah 5/51 (15 overs) |

Bangladesh won by 95 runs
Arnos Vale Ground, Kingstown, Saint Vincent
Umpires: Asoka de Silva (SL) and Tony Hill (NZ)
Player of the match: Tamim Iqbal (Ban)

- Bangladesh won the toss and elected to bat
- Rain delayed the start on day 1 by three hours and continued to interrupt play during the day
- Ryan Austin, Travis Dowlin, Nikita Miller, Omar Phillips, Dale Richards, Kemar Roach, Chadwick Walton (WI) Rubel Hossain and Mahmudullah (Ban) all made their Test debuts.
- This was Bangladesh maiden Test win as a touring side.

=== 2nd Test ===
17–21 July
Scorecard

| West Indies | v | Bangladesh |
| 237 (76.1 overs); Travis Dowlin 95 (162); Shakib Al Hasan 3/59 (21.1 overs) | | 232 (79.5 overs); Mushfiqur Rahim 48 (58); Kemar Roach 6/48 (23.5 overs) |
| 209 (70.5 overs); David Bernard 69 (76); Shakib Al Hasan 5/70 (24.5 overs) | | 217/6 (54.4 overs); Shakib Al Hasan 96* (97); Darren Sammy 5/55 (16 overs)) |

Bangladesh won by 4 wickets
Cricket National Stadium, St George's, Grenada
Umpires: Asoka de Silva (SL) and Tony Hill (NZ)
Player of the match: Shakib Al Hasan (Ban)

- Bangladesh won the toss and elected to field.
- Rain caused the final session on day 3 to be called off.
- Rain delayed the start of play on day 4 by 2 hours.
- This victory secured Bangladesh's first overseas Test series win.

== ODI series ==
=== 1st ODI ===
26 July 2009
Scorecard

| Bangladesh; 246/9 (50 overs) | v | West Indies; 194 (43.4 overs) |
| Mohammad Ashraful 57 (95); Kemar Roach 5/44 (10 overs) | | Devon Smith 65 (84); Abdur Razzak 4/39 (9.4 overs) |

Bangladesh won by 52 runs
Windsor Park, Roseau, Dominica
Umpires: Billy Doctrove (WI) and Tony Hill (NZ)
Player of the match: Abdur Razzak (Ban)

- West Indies won the toss and elected to field.
- Travis Dowlin, Nelon Pascal and Dale Richards (WI) all made their ODI debuts.
- This was Bangladesh's first ODI win against West Indies.

=== 2nd ODI ===
28 July 2009
Scorecard

| West Indies; 274/6 (50 overs) | v | Bangladesh; 276/7 (49 overs) |
| Travis Dowlin 100* (117); Naeem Islam 1/26 (8 overs) | | Shakib Al Hasan 65 (61); Devon Thomas 2/11 (1.1 overs) |

Bangladesh won by 3 wickets
Windsor Park, Roseau, Dominica
Umpires: Billy Doctrove (WI) and Tony Hill (NZ)
Player of the match: Shakib Al Hasan (Ban)

- West Indies won the toss and elected to bat.
- Rain disrupted play in Bangladesh's innings. No overs were lost.
- This was Bangladesh's 200th ODI.

=== 3rd ODI ===
31 July 2009
Scorecard

| West Indies; 248 (47.4 overs) | v | Bangladesh; 249/7 (48.5 overs) |
| Andre Fletcher 52(42); Mahmudullah 2/37 (7 overs) | | Junaid Siddique 55 (73); Kemar Roach 4/63 (9.5 overs) |

Bangladesh won by 3 wickets
Warner Park, Basseterre, Saint Kitts
Umpires: Clyde Duncan (WI) and Tony Hill (NZ)
Player of the match: Mahmudullah (Ban)

- West Indies won the toss and elected to bat.
- Kieran Powell (WI) made his ODI debut.

== Only T20I ==
2 August 2009
Scorecard

| Bangladesh; 118/9 (20 overs) | v | West Indies; 119/5 (16.5 overs) |
| Naeem Islam 27 (18); Nikita Miller 2/22 (4 overs) | | Devon Smith 37 (27); Mohammad Ashraful 2/18 (2 overs) |

West Indies won by 5 wickets
Warner Park, Basseterre, Saint Kitts
Umpires: Clyde Duncan (WI) and Norman Malcolm (WI)
Player of the match: Darren Sammy (WI)

- Bangladesh won the toss and elected to bat.
- David Bernard, Travis Dowlin, Nikita Miller, Floyd Reifer, Dale Richards, Devon Thomas, Gavin Tonge (WI) and Mohammad Nazmul Hossain (Ban) all made their T20I debuts.

== Tour matches ==
=== First-class: West Indies A v Bangladeshis ===
3–5 July
Scorecard

| Bangladeshis (Bangladesh) | v | (Cricket West Indies) West Indies A |
| 195 (63.5 overs); Mohammad Ashraful 50; Kemar Roach 5/62 (17 overs) | | 248 (82.5 overs); Devon Thomas 105; Shakib Al Hasan 3/72 (28 overs) |
| 233/5 (81 overs); Tamim Iqbal 72; Ryan Austin 4/65 (27 overs) |

Match drawn
Kensington Oval, Bridgetown, Barbados
Umpires: Vincent Bullen (WI) and Patrick Grazette (WI)

- Bangladeshis won the toss and elected to bat.

=== List A: University of West Indies Vice Chancellor's XI v Bangladeshis ===
24 July 2009
Scorecard

| Bangladeshis; 167/6 (25 overs) | v | University of West Indies Vice Chancellor's XI; 151/8 (25 overs) |
| Mushfiqur Rahim 82 (59); Gavin Tonge 2/18 (5 overs) | | Omar Phillips 49 (41); Naeem Islam 3/19 (5 overs) |

Bangladeshis won by 16 runs
Benjamin's Park, Portsmouth, Dominica
Umpires: Lennox Abraham (WI) and Roger Laroque (WI)

- Bangladeshis won the toss and elected to bat.
- Rain reduced each sides innings to 25 overs.

== Media coverage ==
Television networks

- Ten Sports (Live) – India
- BTV (Live) – Bangladesh
