= 2009 ICC Champions Trophy squads =

This is a list of the squads picked for the men's 2009 ICC Champions Trophy. This was the sixth edition of the ICC Champions Trophy tournament and took place in South Africa between 24 September and 5 October.

== Australia ==
Australia named their 15-man squad on 22 August 2009. Brad Haddin withdrew from the squad on 3 September 2009 following finger surgery; he was replaced by Tim Paine.

Coach: Tim Nielsen

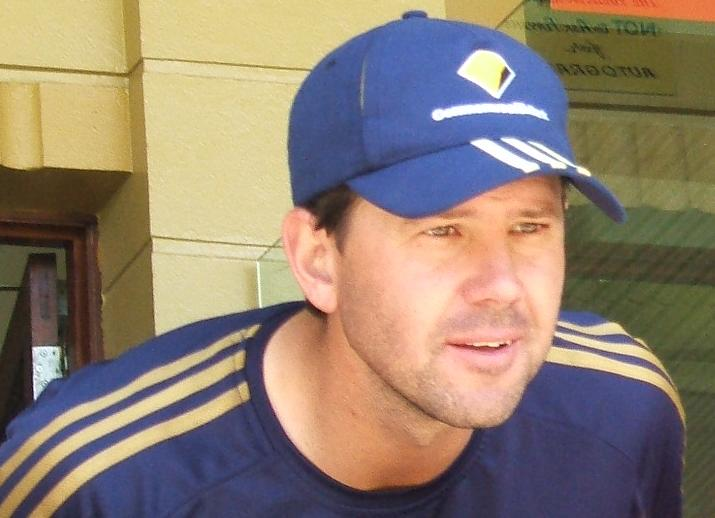
Ricky Ponting, Australia's captain for the tournament.

No.	Player	Date of birth	ODIs	Batting	Bowling style	List A team
14	Ricky Ponting (c)	19 December 1974 (aged 34)	315	Right-handed	Right arm medium pace	(Australia) Tasmanian Tigers
4	Doug Bollinger	24 July 1981 (aged 28)	3	Left-handed	Left arm medium-fast	(Australia) New South Wales Blues
29	David Hussey	2 April 1981 (aged 28)	23	Right-handed	Right arm off break	(Australia) Western Warriors
12	Callum Ferguson	21 November 1984 (aged 24)	14	Right-handed	Right arm medium pace	(Australia) Southern Redbacks
43	Nathan Hauritz	18 October 1981 (aged 27)	19	Right-handed	Right arm off break	(Australia) New South Wales Blues
20	Ben Hilfenhaus	15 March 1983 (aged 26)	12	Right-handed	Right arm fast-medium	(Australia) Tasmanian Tigers
39	James Hopes	24 October 1978 (aged 30)	56	Right-handed	Right arm medium-fast	(Australia) Queensland Bulls
48	Michael Hussey	27 May 1975 (aged 34)	108	Left-handed	Right arm medium pace	(Australia) Western Warriors
25	Mitchell Johnson	2 November 1981 (aged 27)	55	Left-handed	Left arm fast	(Australia) Western Warriors
58	Brett Lee	8 November 1976 (aged 32)	173	Right-handed	Right arm fast	(Australia) New South Wales Blues
36	Tim Paine	8 December 1984 (aged 24)	2	Right-handed	n/a; wicket-keeper	(Australia) Tasmanian Tigers
10	Peter Siddle	25 November 1984 (aged 24)	1	Right-handed	Right arm fast-medium	(Australia) Victorian Bushrangers
24	Adam Voges	4 October 1979 (aged 29)	2	Right-handed	Slow left-arm wrist-spin	(Australia) Western Warriors
33	Shane Watson	17 June 1981 (aged 28)	77	Right-handed	Right arm fast-medium	(Australia) New South Wales Blues
7	Cameron White	18 August 1983 (aged 26)	28	Right-handed	Right arm leg break	(Australia) Victorian Bushrangers

== England ==
England named their 15-man squad on 17 August 2009. Andrew Flintoff was named in the original squad but withdrew on 23 August in order to undergo exploratory surgery on his knee.

Coach: Andy Flower

No.	Player	Date of birth	ODIs	Batting	Bowling style	List A team
14	Andrew Strauss (c)	2 March 1977 (aged 32)	85	Left-handed	Left arm medium pace	(England) Middlesex Crusaders
9	James Anderson	30 July 1982 (aged 27)	108	Left-handed	Right arm fast-medium	(England) Lancashire Lightning
31	Tim Bresnan	28 February 1985 (aged 24)	7	Right-handed	Right arm fast-medium	(England) Yorkshire Carnegie
42	Ravi Bopara	4 May 1985 (aged 24)	40	Right-handed	Right arm medium pace	(England) Essex Eagles
8	Stuart Broad	24 June 1986 (aged 23)	49	Left-handed	Right arm fast-medium	(England) Nottinghamshire Outlaws
5	Paul Collingwood	26 May 1976 (aged 33)	161	Right-handed	Right arm medium pace	(England) Durham Dynamos
55	Joe Denly	16 March 1986 (aged 23)	0	Right-handed	Right arm leg spin	(England) Kent Spitfires
39	Eoin Morgan	10 September 1986 (aged 23)	25	Left-handed	Right arm medium pace; Wicket Keeper	(England) Middlesex Crusaders
13	Matt Prior	26 February 1982 (aged 27)	40	Right-handed	n/a; wicket-keeper	(England) Sussex Sharks
95	Adil Rashid	17 February 1988 (aged 21)	0	Right-handed	Right arm leg break	(England) Yorkshire Carnegie
78	Ryan Sidebottom	15 January 1978 (aged 31)	16	Left-handed	Left arm fast-medium	(England) Nottinghamshire Outlaws
3	Owais Shah	22 October 1978 (aged 30)	59	Right-handed	Right arm off break	(England) Middlesex Crusaders
66	Graeme Swann	24 March 1979 (aged 30)	17	Right-handed	Right arm off break	(England) Nottinghamshire Outlaws
45	Luke Wright	7 March 1985 (aged 24)	16	Right-handed	Right arm medium-fast	(England) Sussex Sharks

== India ==
India named their 15-man squad on 16 August 2009. Yuvraj Singh was replaced by Virat Kohli after he fractured his little finger.

Coach: Gary Kirsten

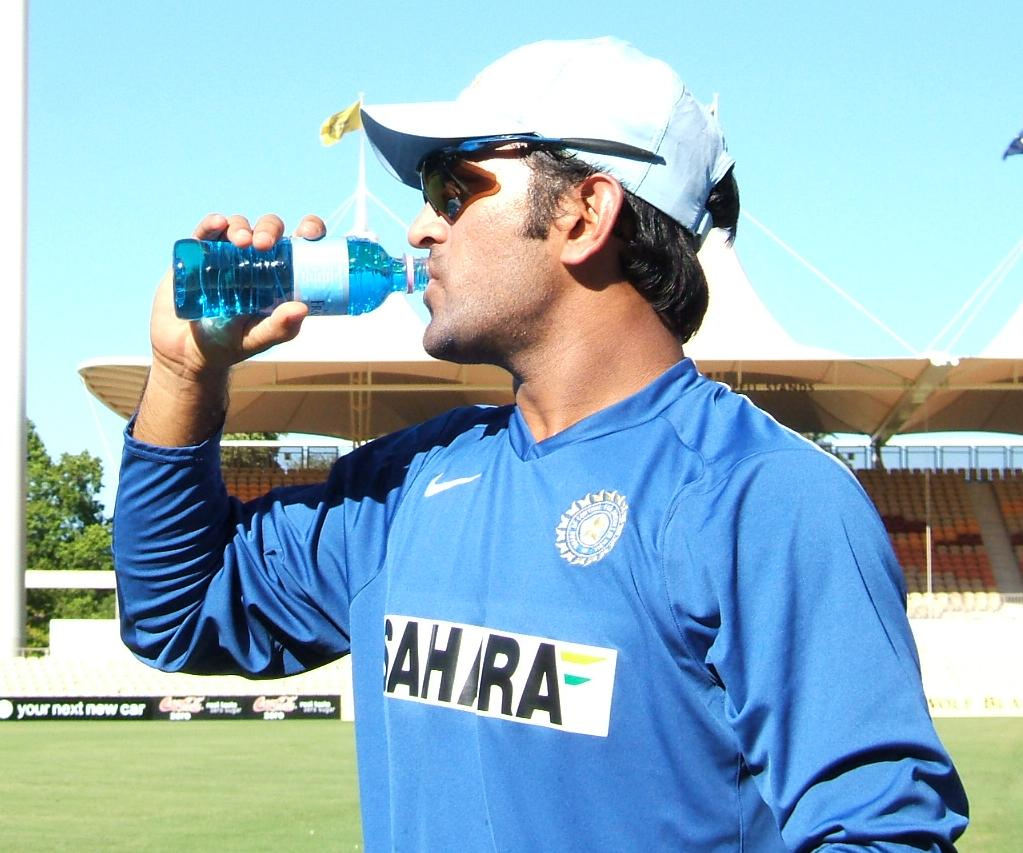
Mahendra Singh Dhoni, India's captain for the tournament.

No.	Player	Date of birth	ODIs	Batting	Bowling style	List A team
7	Mahendra Singh Dhoni (c & wk)	7 July 1981 (aged 28)	142	Right-handed	Right arm medium pace; wicket-keeper	(India) Jharkhand
19	Rahul Dravid	11 January 1973 (aged 36)	336	Right-handed	Right arm off break	(India) Karnataka
5	Gautam Gambhir	14 October 1981 (aged 27)	78	Left-handed	Right arm leg break	(India) Delhi
3	Harbhajan Singh	3 July 1980 (aged 29)	189	Right-handed	Right arm off break	(India) Punjab
91	Dinesh Karthik	1 June 1985 (aged 24)	30	Right-handed	n/a; wicket-keeper	(India) Tamil Nadu
8	Praveen Kumar	2 October 1986 (aged 22)	24	Right-handed	Right arm medium pace	(India) Uttar Pradesh
99	Amit Mishra	24 November 1982 (aged 26)	3	Right-handed	Right arm leg break	(India) Haryana
24	Abhishek Nayar	8 October 1983 (aged 25)	2	Left-handed	Right arm medium pace	(India) Mumbai
64	Ashish Nehra	29 April 1979 (aged 30)	76	Right-handed	Left arm medium-fast	(India) Delhi
28	Yusuf Pathan	17 November 1982 (aged 26)	26	Right-handed	Right arm off break	(India) Baroda
48	Suresh Raina	27 November 1986 (aged 22)	65	Left-handed	Right arm off break	(India) Uttar Pradesh
29	Ishant Sharma	2 September 1988 (aged 21)	30	Right-handed	Right arm fast	(India) Delhi
9	R. P. Singh	6 December 1985 (aged 23)	51	Right-handed	Left arm fast-medium	(India) Uttar Pradesh
10	Sachin Tendulkar	24 April 1973 (aged 36)	425	Right-handed	Right arm leg break/off break/medium pace	(India) Mumbai
18	Virat Kohli	5 November 1988 (aged 20)	4	Right-handed	Right arm medium pace	(India) Delhi

== New Zealand ==
New Zealand named their 15-man squad on 23 August 2009. Jesse Ryder cramped in a match. Daryl Tuffey and Jacob Oram were also injured. Thus New Zealand team lost three of their mainstream players. Scott Styris was also called from New Zealand for replacements in the final or semi-final of 2009 ICC Champions Trophy.

Coach: Andy Moles

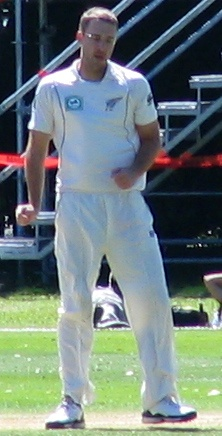
Daniel Vettori, New Zealand's captain for the tournament.

No.	Player	Date of birth	ODIs	Batting	Bowling style	List A team
11	Daniel Vettori (c)	27 January 1979 (aged 30)	239	Left-handed	Slow left arm orthodox	(New Zealand) Northern Districts Knights
27	Shane Bond	7 June 1975 (aged 34)	67	Right-handed	Right arm fast	(New Zealand) Canterbury Wizards
4	Neil Broom	20 November 1983 (aged 25)	8	Right-handed	Right arm medium pace	(New Zealand) Otago Volts
2	Ian Butler	24 November 1981 (aged 27)	18	Right-handed	Right arm fast-medium	(New Zealand) Otago Volts
51	Brendon Diamanti	30 April 1981 (aged 28)	1	Right-handed	Right arm medium pace	(New Zealand) Central Districts Stags
88	Grant Elliott	21 March 1979 (aged 30)	21	Right-handed	Right arm medium-fast	(New Zealand) Wellington Firebirds
31	Martin Guptill	30 September 1986 (aged 22)	12	Right-handed	Right arm off break	(New Zealand) Auckland Aces
48	Gareth Hopkins	24 November 1976 (aged 32)	12	Right-handed	n/a; wicket-keeper	(New Zealand) Auckland Aces
42	Brendon McCullum	27 September 1981 (aged 27)	153	Right-handed	n/a; wicket-keeper	(New Zealand) Otago Volts
37	Kyle Mills	15 March 1979 (aged 30)	102	Right-handed	Right arm fast-medium	(New Zealand) Auckland Aces
24	Jacob Oram	28 July 1978 (aged 31)	130	Left-handed	Right arm fast-medium	(New Zealand) Central Districts Stags
39	Jeetan Patel	7 May 1980 (aged 29)	38	Right-handed	Right arm off break	(New Zealand) Wellington Firebirds
77	Jesse Ryder	6 August 1984 (aged 25)	17	Left-handed	Right arm medium pace	(New Zealand) Wellington Firebirds
3	Ross Taylor	8 March 1984 (aged 25)	63	Right-handed	Right arm off break	(New Zealand) Central Districts Stags
14	Daryl Tuffey	11 June 1978 (aged 31)	80	Right-handed	Right arm fast-medium	(New Zealand) Northern Districts Knights

== Pakistan ==
Pakistan named their 15-man squad on 21 August 2009. Mohammad Asif got selected after his ban after a year and a half. Also the three players from ICL Imran Nazir, Mohammad Yousuf and Naved-ul-Hasan made their way into the squad after issuing the photocopies of NOC to the PCB. Shahid Afridi acted as captain in their first match.

Coach: Intikhab Alam

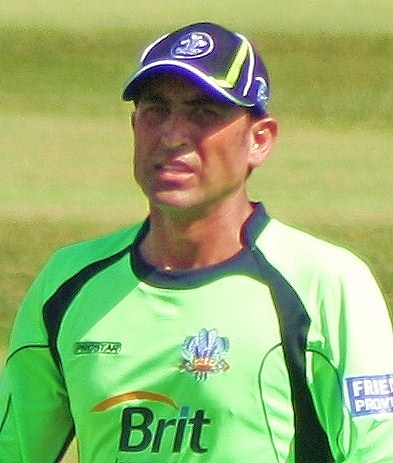
Younis Khan, Pakistan's captain for the tournament.

No.	Player	Date of birth	ODIs	Batting	Bowling style	List A team
75	Younis Khan (c)	29 November 1977 (aged 31)	191	Right-handed	Right arm medium pace	(Pakistan) HBL
10	Shahid Afridi (vc)	1 May 1980 (aged 29)	281	Right-handed	Right arm leg break	(Pakistan) Karachi
25	Fawad Alam	8 October 1985 (aged 23)	14	Left-handed	Right arm off break	(Pakistan) Karachi
21	Iftikhar Anjum	1 December 1980 (aged 28)	60	Right-handed	Right arm fast-medium	(Pakistan) Zarai Taraqiati Bank
17	Imran Nazir	16 December 1981 (aged 27)	74	Right-handed	Right arm off break	(Pakistan) Karachi Zebras
23	Kamran Akmal	13 January 1982 (aged 27)	104	Right-handed	n/a; wicket-keeper	(Pakistan) Lahore
22	Misbah-ul-Haq	28 May 1974 (aged 35)	54	Right-handed	Right arm leg break	(Pakistan) SNGPL
90	Mohammad Amir	13 April 1991 (aged 18)	5	Left-handed	Left arm Fast	(Pakistan) Punjab
26	Mohammad Asif	20 December 1982 (aged 26)	31	Right-handed	Right arm fast-medium	(Pakistan) Sialkot
13	Mohammad Yousuf	27 August 1974 (aged 35)	269	Right-handed	Right arm off break	(Pakistan) Lahore
24	Naved-ul-Hasan	28 February 1978 (aged 31)	62	Right-handed	Right arm medium pace	(Pakistan) Punjab
50	Saeed Ajmal	14 October 1977 (aged 31)	15	Right-handed	Right arm off break	(Pakistan) Faisalabad
18	Shoaib Malik	1 February 1982 (aged 27)	181	Right-handed	Right arm off break	(Pakistan) Punjab
55	Umar Gul	14 April 1984 (aged 25)	60	Right-handed	Right arm fast-medium	(Pakistan) Peshawar
96	Umar Akmal	26 May 1990 (aged 19)	4	Right-handed	Right arm off break	(Pakistan) Lahore

== South Africa ==
South Africa named their 15-man squad on 20 August 2009.

Coach: Mickey Arthur

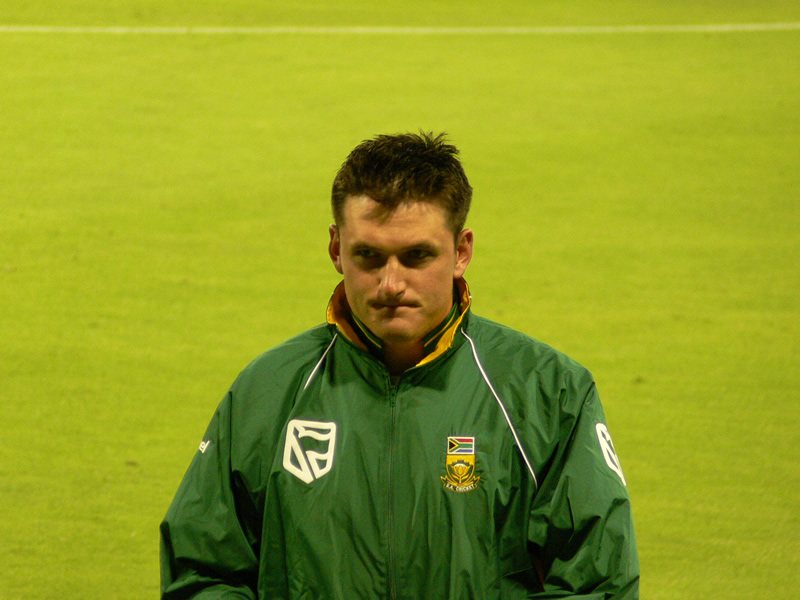
Graeme Smith, South Africa's captain for the tournament.

No.	Player	Date of birth	ODIs	Batting	Bowling style	List A team
15	Graeme Smith (c)	1 February 1981 (aged 28)	141	Left-handed	Right arm off break	(South Africa) Cape Cobras
1	Hashim Amla	31 March 1983 (aged 26)	16	Right-handed	Right arm medium pace	(South Africa) Dolphins
22	Johan Botha	2 May 1982 (aged 27)	45	Right-handed	Right arm off break	(South Africa) Warriors
9	Mark Boucher	3 December 1976 (aged 32)	280	Right-handed	n/a; wicket-keeper	(South Africa) Warriors
17	AB de Villiers	17 February 1984 (aged 25)	85	Right-handed	Right arm medium pace	(South Africa) Titans
21	JP Duminy	14 April 1984 (aged 25)	47	Left-handed	Right arm off break	(South Africa) Cape Cobras
09	Herschelle Gibbs	23 February 1974 (aged 35)	244	Right-handed	Right arm leg break	(South Africa) Cape Cobras
3	Jacques Kallis	16 October 1975 (aged 33)	291	Right-handed	Right arm fast-medium	(South Africa) Cape Cobras
81	Albie Morkel	10 June 1981 (aged 28)	40	Left-handed	Right arm medium-fast	(South Africa) Titans
16	Makhaya Ntini	6 July 1977 (aged 32)	173	Right-handed	Right arm fast	(South Africa) Warriors
36	Wayne Parnell	30 July 1989 (aged 20)	4	Left-handed	Left arm fast-medium	(South Africa) Warriors
13	Robin Peterson	4 August 1979 (aged 30)	35	Left-handed	Slow left arm orthodox	(South Africa) Warriors
8	Dale Steyn	27 June 1983 (aged 26)	29	Right-handed	Right arm fast	(South Africa) Titans
68	Lonwabo Tsotsobe	7 March 1984 (aged 25)	1	Right-handed	Left arm fast-medium	(South Africa) Warriors
52	Roelof van der Merwe	31 December 1984 (aged 24)	4	Right-handed	Slow left arm orthodox	(South Africa) Titans

== Sri Lanka ==
Sri Lanka named their 15-man squad on 25 August 2009.

Coach: Trevor Bayliss

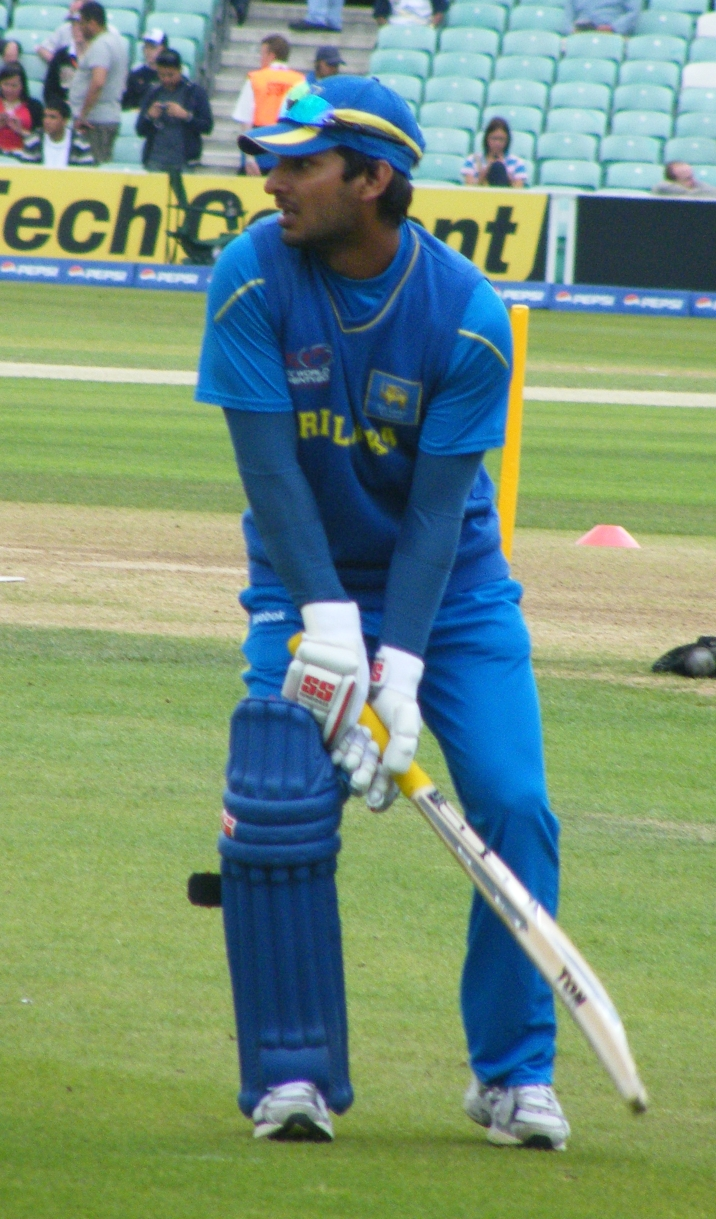
Kumar Sangakkara, Sri Lanka's captain for the tournament.

No.	Player	Date of birth	ODIs	Batting	Bowling style	List A team
11	Kumar Sangakkara (c)	27 October 1977 (aged 31)	251	Left-handed	Right arm off break; wicket-keeper	(Sri Lanka) Nondescripts
18	Tillakaratne Dilshan	14 October 1976 (aged 32)	160	Right-handed	Right arm off break	(Sri Lanka) Bloomfield
7	Sanath Jayasuriya	30 June 1969 (aged 40)	435	Left-handed	Slow left arm orthodox	(Sri Lanka) Bloomfield
27	Mahela Jayawardene	27 May 1977 (aged 32)	304	Right-handed	Right arm medium pace	(Sri Lanka) Sinhalese
25	Thilina Kandamby	4 June 1982 (aged 27)	96	Left-handed	Right arm leg break	(Sri Lanka) Sinhalese
16	Chamara Kapugedera	24 February 1987 (aged 22)	64	Right-handed	Right arm medium pace	(Sri Lanka) Colombo
92	Nuwan Kulasekara	22 July 1982 (aged 27)	56	Right-handed	Right arm fast-medium	(Sri Lanka) Colts
99	Lasith Malinga	28 August 1983 (aged 26)	56	Right-handed	Right arm fast	(Sri Lanka) Nondescripts
69	Angelo Mathews	2 June 1987 (aged 22)	10	Right-handed	Right arm fast-medium	(Sri Lanka) Colombo
40	Ajantha Mendis	11 March 1985 (aged 24)	30	Right-handed	Right arm slow	(Sri Lanka) Wayamba
8	Muttiah Muralitharan	17 April 1972 (aged 37)	332	Right-handed	Right arm off break	(Sri Lanka) Tamil Union
30	Dammika Prasad	30 May 1983 (aged 26)	5	Right-handed	Right arm medium pace	(Sri Lanka) Sinhalese
3	Thilan Samaraweera	22 September 1976 (aged 33)	21	Right-handed	Right arm off break	(Sri Lanka) Sinhalese
44	Upul Tharanga	2 February 1985 (aged 24)	82	Left-handed		(Sri Lanka) Nondescripts
97	Thilan Thushara	1 March 1981 (aged 28)	28	Left-handed	Left arm medium-fast	(Sri Lanka) Sinhalese

== West Indies ==
West Indies named their 15-man squad on 17 August 2009. Despite some negotiations with the West Indian players the Board named their A-team players for the tournament.

Coach: David Williams

No.	Player	Date of birth	ODIs	Batting	Bowling style	List A team
60	Floyd Reifer (c)	23 July 1972 (aged 37)	5	Left-handed	Right arm medium pace	Combined Campuses and Colleges
8	David Bernard	19 July 1981 (aged 28)	4	Right-handed	Right arm medium-fast	Jamaica
2	Tino Best	26 August 1981 (aged 28)	11	Right-handed	Right arm fast	Barbados
43	Royston Crandon	31 May 1983 (aged 26)	0	Right-handed	Right arm off break	Guyana
15	Travis Dowlin	24 February 1977 (aged 32)	3	Right-handed	Right arm off break	Guyana
72	Andre Fletcher	28 November 1987 (aged 21)	7	Right-handed	Right arm off break	Windward Islands
33	Nikita Miller	16 May 1982 (aged 27)	17	Right-handed	Slow left arm orthodox	Jamaica
39	Daren Powell	15 April 1978 (aged 31)	55	Right-handed	Right arm fast-medium	Jamaica
23	Kieran Powell	6 March 1990 (aged 19)	1	Left-handed	Right arm medium pace / off break	Leeward Islands
34	Dale Richards	16 July 1976 (aged 33)	2	Right-handed	Right arm medium pace	Barbados
24	Kemar Roach	30 June 1988 (aged 21)	5	Right-handed	Right arm fast-medium	Barbados
88	Darren Sammy	20 December 1983 (aged 25)	26	Right-handed	Right arm medium-fast	Windward Islands
28	Devon Smith	21 October 1981 (aged 27)	29	Left-handed	Right arm off break	Windward Islands
48	Gavin Tonge	13 January 1983 (aged 26)	2	Right-handed	Right arm fast-medium	Leeward Islands
42	Chadwick Walton	3 July 1985 (aged 24)	0	Right-handed	n/a; wicket-keeper	Combined Campuses and Colleges
