= West Indian cricket team in Australia in 2009–10 =

The Frank Worrell Trophy 2009–10
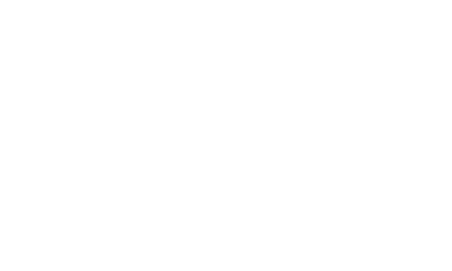
	Australia	West Indies
- Dates: 18 November 2009 – 23 February 2010
Captains	Ricky Ponting (Tests and ODIs); Michael Clarke (Twenty20s)	Chris Gayle

Test series
- Result: Australia won the 3-match series 2–0
Most runs	Simon Katich (302); Shane Watson (263); Michael Hussey (235)	Chris Gayle (346); Brendan Nash (250); Dwayne Bravo (176)
Most wickets	Mitchell Johnson (17); Doug Bollinger (13); Nathan Hauritz (11)	Sulieman Benn (11); Dwayne Bravo (11); Kemar Roach (7)
- Player of the series: Chris Gayle (WI)

One Day International series
- Results: Australia won the 5-match series 4–0
Most runs	Ricky Ponting (295); Shane Watson (189)	Kieron Pollard (170); Dwayne Smith (130)
Most wickets	Doug Bollinger (11); Ryan Harris (7)	Ravi Rampaul (9); Kieron Pollard (7)
- Player of the series: Ricky Ponting (Aus)

Twenty20 International series
- Results: Australia won the 2-match series 2–0
Most runs	David Warner (116); Shane Watson (99)	Denesh Ramdin (53); Runako Morton (40)
Most wickets	Shaun Tait (4); Dirk Nannes (3)	Nikita Miller (4); Chris Gayle (2)

The West Indies cricket team toured Australia, in the Frank Worrell Trophy for a 3-match Test series, a 5-match ODI series, and 2 Twenty20 Internationals from 18 November 2009 to 23 February 2010. Australia remained unbeaten throughout the summer, winning the test series 2–0, ODI series 4–0 and the Twenty20 series 2–0 besides completing a clean sweep of Pakistan earlier in January. Hence the Australians fulfilled their dreams of having an unbeaten summer. Since the introduction of ODIs in the 1970s, they had only one other summer – 2000–01 – when they didn't lose a match.

== Squads ==
Test squads		ODI squads		Twenty20 squads
Australia	West Indies	Australia	West Indies	Australia	West Indies
Ricky Ponting (c)	Chris Gayle (c)	Ricky Ponting (c)	Chris Gayle (c)	Michael Clarke (c)	Chris Gayle (c)
Doug Bollinger	Adrian Barath	Doug Bollinger	Runako Morton	Travis Birt	Runako Morton
Michael Clarke	Sulieman Benn	Michael Clarke	Lendl Simmons	Daniel Christian	Lendl Simmons
Brad Haddin (wk)	Denesh Ramdin (wk)	Brad Haddin (wk)	Denesh Ramdin (wk)	Brad Haddin (wk)	Denesh Ramdin (wk)
Nathan Hauritz	Shivnarine Chanderpaul	Nathan Hauritz	Kieron Pollard	David Hussey	Kieron Pollard
Ben Hilfenhaus	Narsingh Deonarine	Ryan Harris	Narsingh Deonarine	Ryan Harris	Narsingh Deonarine
Mike Hussey	Travis Dowlin	Mike Hussey	Travis Dowlin	David Warner	Travis Dowlin
Mitchell Johnson	Brendan Nash	Mitchell Johnson	Dwayne Smith	Mitchell Johnson	Dwayne Smith
Simon Katich	Dwayne Bravo	James Hopes	Nikita Miller	Dirk Nannes	Nikita Miller
Marcus North	Ravi Rampaul	Cameron White	Ravi Rampaul	Cameron White	Ravi Rampaul
Peter Siddle	Kemar Roach	Shaun Marsh	Kemar Roach	Shaun Marsh	Kemar Roach
Shane Watson	Darren Sammy	Shane Watson	Darren Sammy	Shane Watson	Darren Sammy
Clint McKay	Ramnaresh Sarwan	Clint McKay	Wavell Hinds	Steve Smith	Wavell Hinds
Brett Geeves	Jerome Taylor	Tim Paine (wk)	Gavin Tonge	Shaun Tait	Gavin Tonge
	Gavin Tonge	Adam Voges	Brendan Nash		Brendan Nash
		Steve Smith

== Tour matches ==
=== First-class match: Queensland v West Indians – 18–21 November ===
18 – 21 November
Scorecard

West Indians	v	Queensland (H)
271 (74 overs); RR Sarwan 73 (165); DJ Doran 3/107 [23]		617/7d (155 overs); NJ Kruger 172 (205); KAJ Roach 3/135 [32]
357/6 (115 overs); AB Barath 74 (140); NJ Rimmington 2/60 [25]

Match drawn
Allan Border Field, Brisbane, Australia
Umpires: NS McNamara (Aus) and BNJ Oxenford (Aus)

- West Indians won the toss and elected to bat.
- Luke Feldman and Alister McDermott (Queensland) both made their first-class debuts.

=== 1-day tour match: Prime Minister's XI v West Indians – 4 February ===
4 February 2010
Scorecard

West Indians; 399/5 (45 overs)	v	Prime Minister's XI; 312/7 (45 overs)
CH Gayle 146 (89); AR Keath 4/71 [7]		TLW Cooper 160 (120); NO Miller 3/51 [9]

West Indians won by 90 runs (D/L method)
Manuka Oval, Canberra, Australia
Umpires: RL Parry (Aus) and Y Ramasundara (Aus)
Player of the match: CH Gayle (WI) and TLW Cooper (Prime Minister's XI)

- Prime Minister's XI won the toss and elected to field.
- Rain initially reduced the game to 48 overs. Further rain cut the West Indies innings short by 3 overs, with the (D/L method) giving the Prime Minister's XI a revised target of 403 from 45 overs.

== Test series ==
=== 1st Test ===
26 – 28 November 2009
Scorecard

Australia	v	West Indies
480/8d (135 overs); Simon Katich 92 (135); Dwayne Bravo 3/118 (32 overs)		228 (63 overs); Travis Dowlin 62 (150); Nathan Hauritz 3/17 (6 overs)
		187 (f/o) (52.1 overs); Adrian Barath 104 (138); Ben Hilfenhaus 3/20 (7 overs)

Australia won by an innings and 65 runs
The Gabba, Brisbane
Umpires: Asad Rauf (Pak) and Ian Gould (Eng)
Player of the match: Ben Hilfenhaus (Aus)

- Australia won the toss and elected to bat.

=== 2nd Test ===
4 – 8 December 2009
Scorecard

West Indies	v	Australia
451 (124.1 overs); Dwayne Bravo 104 (156); Mitchell Johnson 3/105 (26.1 overs)		439 (131.1 overs); Shane Watson 96 (148); Sulieman Benn 5/155 (53 overs)
317 (99.5 overs); Chris Gayle 165* (285); Mitchell Johnson 5/103 (22 overs)		212/5 (76 overs); Michael Clarke 61* (108); Dwayne Bravo 3/37 (15 overs)

Match drawn
Adelaide Oval, Adelaide
Umpires: Asad Rauf (Pak), Mark Benson (Eng), Ian Gould (Eng)
Player of the match: Chris Gayle (WI)

- West Indies won the toss and elected to bat.
- Asad Rauf replaced Mark Benson as on-field umpire from day 2 onwards.

=== 3rd Test ===
16 – 20 December 2009
Scorecard

Australia	v	West Indies
520/7 d (130.4 overs); Simon Katich 99 (177); Narsingh Deonarine 2/74 (23 overs)		312 (81 overs); Chris Gayle 102 (72); Doug Bollinger 5/70 (20 overs)
150 (51.3 overs); Shane Watson 30 (55); Dwayne Bravo 4/42 (17.3 overs)		323 (94.3 overs); Narsingh Deonarine 82 (171); Mitchell Johnson 3/67 (16 overs)

Australia won by 35 runs
Western Australia Cricket Association Ground, Perth
Umpires: Billy Bowden (NZ) and Ian Gould (Eng)
Player of the match: Chris Gayle (WI)

- Australia won the toss and elected to bat.

== ODI series ==
=== 1st ODI ===
7 February 2010
14:25 (D/N)
Scorecard

Australia; 256/8 (50 overs)	v	West Indies; 143 (34.2 overs)
SR Watson 59 (74); KA Pollard 3/45 [10]		KA Pollard 31 (35); RJ Harris 3/24 [9]

Australia won by 113 runs
Melbourne Cricket Ground, Melbourne, Australia Attendance: 25,500
Umpires: BF Bowden (NZ) and BNJ Oxenford (Aus)
Player of the match: SR Watson (Aus)

- West Indies won the toss and elected to field.

=== 2nd ODI ===
9 February 2010
13:55 (D/N)
Scorecard

West Indies; 170 (39.4 overs)	v	Australia; 171/2 (26.3 overs)
DR Smith 43 (63); DE Bollinger 4/28 [8]		RT Ponting 57* (55); DR Smith 1/28 [4]

Australia won by 8 wickets
Adelaide Oval, Adelaide, Australia
Umpires: BF Bowden (NZ) and BNJ Oxenford (Aus)
Player of the match: DE Bollinger (Aus)

- West Indies won the toss and elected to bat

=== 3rd ODI ===
12 February 2010
14:25 (D/N)
Scorecard

Australia; 225 (49.5 overs)	v	West Indies; 6/0 (1.0 overs)
MJ Clarke 46 (74); R Rampaul 4/61 [9.5]

No result
Sydney Cricket Ground, Sydney, Australia
Umpires: BF Bowden (NZ) and BNJ Oxenford (Aus)

- West Indies won the toss and elected to field.
- Rain delayed the West Indies innings which was then abandoned at the end of the first over.

=== 4th ODI ===
14 February 2010
13:25 (D/N)
Scorecard

Australia; 324/7 (50 overs)	v	West Indies; 274/8 (50 overs)
RT Ponting 106 (112); DJG Sammy 2/44 [8]		KA Pollard 62 (55); DE Bollinger 2/44 [10]

Australia won by 50 runs
Brisbane Cricket Ground, Brisbane, Australia
Umpires: BF Bowden (NZ) and PR Reiffel (Aus)
Player of the match: RT Ponting (Aus)

- West Indies won the toss and elected to field.

=== 5th ODI ===
19 February 2010
14:25 (D/N)
Scorecard

Australia; 324/5 (50.0 overs)	v	West Indies; 199 (36.5 overs)
RT Ponting 61 (55); KA Pollard 2/59 [9]		DJG Sammy 47* (41); DE Bollinger 3/33 [7]

Australia won by 125 runs
Melbourne Cricket Ground, Melbourne, Australia Attendance: 15,600
Umpires: BF Bowden (NZ) and BNJ Oxenford (Aus)
Player of the match: JR Hopes (Aus)

- Australia won the toss and elected to bat
- Steve Smith made his ODI debut

== Twenty20 International Series ==
=== 1st T20I ===
21 February 2010
18:35 (D/N)
Scorecard

Australia; 179/8 (20 overs)	v	West Indies; 141/8 (20 overs)
DA Warner 49 (32); CH Gayle 2/15 [2]		D Ramdin 44 (26); DP Nannes 3/21 [4]

Australia won by 38 runs
Bellerive Oval, Hobart, Australia Attendance:18,000
Umpires: BNJ Oxenford (Aus) and PR Reiffel (Aus)
Player of the match: SW Tait (Aus)

- Australia won the toss and elected to bat.
- Narsingh Deonarine made his T20I debut for West Indies.

=== 2nd T20I ===
23 February 2010
18:35 (D/N)
Scorecard

West Indies; 138/7 (20 overs)	v	Australia; 142/2 (11.4 overs)
N Deonarine 36 (29); RJ Harris 2/27 [4]		DA Warner 67 (29); NO Miller 2/56 [3.4]

Australia won by 8 wickets
Sydney Cricket Ground, Sydney, Australia
Umpires: BNJ Oxenford (Aus) and RJ Tucker (Aus)
Player of the match: DA Warner (Aus)

- West Indies won the toss and elected to bat

== Media coverage ==
- Sky Sports (live) (HD) – United Kingdom and Ireland
- Star Cricket (live) – India
- Fox Sports (live) (HD) – Australia
- SKY Sport (live) (HD) – New Zealand
- Geo Super (live) – Pakistan
- Supersport (live) – South Africa
- Nine Network (live) – Australia
- Caribbean Media Corporation (live) – Caribbean countries
- Eurosport (live) – Europe
- DirecTV (live) – USA
