= West Indian cricket team in Sri Lanka in 2010–11 =

International cricket tour

	Sri Lanka	West Indies
- Dates: 10 November 2010 – 21 December 2010
Captains	Darren Sammy	Kumar Sangakkara

Test series
- Result: 3-match series drawn 0–0
Most runs	Kumar Sangakkara (228)	Chris Gayle (366)
Most wickets	Ajantha Mendis (11)	Kemar Roach (10)
- Player of the series: Kemar Roach (WI)

One Day International series
- Results: Sri Lanka won the 3-match series 2–0
Most runs	Upul Tharanga (140)	Ramnaresh Sarwan (147)
Most wickets	Lasith Malinga (6)	Sulieman Benn (4)
- Player of the series: Upul Tharanga (SL)

The West Indies cricket team is touring Sri Lanka from 10 November to 21 December 2010. The tour consists of one three One Day Internationals (ODIs) and three Tests. A three-day tour match between West Indies and Sri Lanka Cricket president's XI was also played at the Sinhalese Sports Club Ground from 10 to 12 November.

When the 3rd match of the Test series was played at Pallekele in Kandy, Pallekele International Cricket Stadium became the 104th Test venue in the world. The stadium is also Sri Lanka's eight.

A five-match ODI series and a single Twenty20 match were originally scheduled to be played from 9–19 and 21 December respectively. Due to bad weather, the ODI series was changed to three matches in late January 2011 and the Twenty20 match cancelled.

British Eurosport bagged the rights to show the matches in the United Kingdom.

== Squads ==
Test squads		ODI squads
Sri Lanka	West Indies	Sri Lanka	West Indies
Kumar Sangakkara (c)	Darren Sammy (c)	Kumar Sangakkara (c)	Darren Sammy (c)
Mahela Jayawardene	Adrian Barath	Mahela Jayawardene	Adrian Barath
Tillakaratne Dilshan	Sulieman Benn	Tillakaratne Dilshan	Carlton Baugh (wk)
Tharanga Paranavitana	Darren Bravo	Upul Tharanga	Sulieman Benn
Thilan Samaraweera	Chris Gayle	Thilan Samaraweera	Dwayne Bravo
Angelo Mathews	Kemar Roach	Angelo Mathews	Darren Bravo
Prasanna Jayawardene (wk)	Shane Shillingford	Chamara Kapugedera	Shivnarine Chanderpaul
Thilina Kandamby	Devon Thomas (wk)	Suraj Randiv	Kirk Edwards
Ajantha Mendis	Brendan Nash (vc)	Ajantha Mendis	Chris Gayle
Suraj Randiv	Carlton Baugh (wk)	Lasith Malinga	Nikita Miller
Rangana Herath	Dwayne Bravo	Rangana Herath	Kieron Pollard
Kaushal Silva	Shivnarine Chanderpaul	Nuwan Kulasekara	Ravi Rampaul
Dammika Prasad	Devon Smith	Thisara Perera	Kemar Roach
Thilan Thushara	Nelon Pascal	Dilhara Fernando	Andre Russell
Suranga Lakmal	Andre Russell	Chamara Silva	Devon Smith
		Jeevan Mendis

‡ Sri Lanka named a 16-man squad for the first two one-day internationals on 4 December 2010.

== First-class matches ==
=== Tour match – Sri Lanka Cricket president's XI v West Indians ===
10–12 November 2010
Scorecard

West Indians	v	Sri Lanka Board president's XI
176 (55.3 overs); Brendan Nash 62 (107); Chanaka Welegedara 3/37 (13 overs)		59/3 (13 overs); Lahiru Thirimanne 30 (40); Darren Sammy 1/0 (1 over)

Match drawn
Sinhalese Sports Club Ground, Colombo
Umpires: Rohitha Kottahachchi (Sri) and Prageeth Rambukwella (Sri)

- West Indians, who chose to bat
- Days 2 and 3 saw no play.

== Test Series ==
Alan G. Hurst of Australia served as the match referee for the Test series.

=== 1st Test ===
15–19 November
Scorecard

West Indies	v	Sri Lanka
580/9d (163.2 overs); Chris Gayle 333 (437); Ajantha Mendis 6/169 (59 overs)		378 (95.2 overs); Kumar Sangakkara 73 (102); Shane Shillingford 4/123 (33.2 overs)
		241/4 (f/o) (81.2 overs); Tharanga Paranavitana 95 (219); Kemar Roach 2/55 (17 overs)

Match drawn
Galle International Stadium, Galle
Umpires: Steve Davis (Aus) & Richard Kettleborough (Eng)
Player of the match: Chris Gayle (WI)

- West Indies won the toss and elected to bat.
- Chris Gayle scored his highest total in Test Match cricket with 333.
  Bad light stopped play after lunch on day 3.
  Sri Lanka follow on after being dismissed for 378 in 1st innings (follow on target was 381)
- Darren Bravo and Andre Russell (WI) both made their Test debuts. This was also Russell's only Test match he played throughout his international career.

Shane Shillingford was reported for a suspected illegal bowling action during the Test. He had match figures of five for 202 in the Test. Shillingford was reported to the International Cricket Council (ICC) by the two on-field umpires, as well as TV umpire Asad Rauf and fourth umpire Tyron Wijewardene due to a straightening of the arm during his Doosra delivery.

=== 2nd Test ===
23–27 November
Scorecard

Sri Lanka	v	West Indies
387/9d (115.2 overs); Kumar Sangakkara 150 (268); Kemar Roach 5/100 (28.3 overs)		243 (71.3 overs); Darren Bravo 80 (129); Rangana Herath 3/76 (23 overs)
57/1d (15 overs); Tillakaratne Dilshan 26 (34); Dwayne Bravo 1/8 (4 overs)		12/2 (11 overs); Adrian Barath 8 (17); Ajantha Mendis 1/1 (3 overs)

Match drawn
R. Premadasa Stadium, Colombo
Umpires: Asad Rauf (Pak) and Richard Kettleborough (Eng)
Player of the match: Kumar Sangakkara (SL)

- Sri Lanka won the toss and elected to bat.
- Bad light stopped play on days 1 and 3. Rain caused the end of day 2, and prevented play on day 4.
- Suranga Lakmal (SL) made his Test debut.

The 2nd Test was held at the R. Premadasa stadium despite its undergoing extensive renovation. The Sri Lankan Cricket Board defended choosing Premadasa stadium saying that the decision to stage a game was to allow cricketers to acclimatise themselves to the ground ahead of the 2011 World Cup games.

Sri Lanka cricket selectors recalled Nuwan Kulasekara and uncapped Shaminda Eranga for the second Test and dropped fast bowlers Dammika Prasad and Thilan Thushara, who went wicketless in the Galle Test.

Day 1 only saw 37. 2 overs of cricket due to a damp outfield and gloomy conditions. Sri Lanka went to stumps at 84 for three with Kemar Roach taking the wickets of Sri Lankan openers, Tharanga Paranavitana (16) and Tillakaratne Dilshan (4). On Day 2 Kumar Sangakkara completed his 24th Test century with an unbeaten 135 to guide Sri Lanka to 294 for five, when rain forced again a premature end. On Day 3 despite Sangakkara's departure for 150 in the morning, Sri Lanka looked to step up the scoring and declared at 387 for 9 after the tail chipped in with some valuable runs. In reply West Indies closed the day on 165 for five wickets with hosts gaining some edge with late strikes. Darren Bravo top scored for the visitors with a classy 80 only to end his innings in the day's penultimate over. Rain prevented any play on Day 4. In the afternoon play of Day 5 Sri Lanka took the remaining five West Indies first-innings wickets in less than two hours. Rangana Herath topped Sri Lanka's bowling and finished on 3/76. Sri Lanka made a solid start in the evening session and declared at 57 for one wicket. Later Kummar Sanggakara said that he made the surprise declaration to try to get the psychological advantage over the visitors. The ploy worked for Sri Lanka, as they put pressure on the West Indies top order with ten overs of testing bowling. At the close West Indies were 12 for 2.

=== 3rd Test ===
1–5 December
Scorecard

West Indies	v	Sri Lanka
303/8 (103.3 overs); Darren Bravo 68 (117); Rangana Herath 4/54 (23 overs)

Match drawn
Pallekele International Cricket Stadium, Kandy
Umpires: Asad Rauf (Pak) and Bruce Oxenford (Aus)

- Sri Lanka won the toss and elected to field.
- Bad light and rain curtailed play on Days 1, 2, and 4 with rain also delaying play on Day 1. Rain prevented play on Day 3 and Day 5.

On the opening day, Pallekele International Cricket Stadium became the 104th Test venue in the world and Sri Lanka's eight. Nuwan Kulasekara, who played the 2nd Test was left out of the Sri Lankan side due to a side strain. He was replaced by medium pacer Dilhara Fernando.

The start of the match was delayed by a wet outfield and heavy rains. Bursts of rain just after lunch and bad light in the evening contributed to shorten Day 1 which only saw 40 overs of play. Suranga Lakmal trapped Chris Gayle Leg Before Wicket (LBW) for a duck with the day's first delivery to begin Test cricket at the new venue in dramatic fashion. By dismissing Gayle, he became the third bowler to take a wicket with the first ball bowled in a test match at a new venue, joining Kapil Dev of India and Imran Khan of Pakistan.

At close of play, half-centuries from inform Darren Bravo and Devon Smith helped the West Indies to reach 134 for 2 on Day 1. Only 41 overs of play were possible on Day 2 due to rain. West Indies were 244 for 5 at the close of play with Brendan Nash on 62 and Carlton Baugh yet to score. Rain prevented any play on Day 3 and only 20 overs were possible on Day 4. Rangana Herath struck three times in the morning of Day 4 to claim the wickets of Brendan Nash, Carlton Baugh and Darren Sammy. No play was possible on Day 5 due to rain. A draw was declared after the match was called off at 1:30 pm local time.

== ODI series ==
Five matches were originally scheduled for 9, 11, 15, 17, 19 December 2010. The Twenty20 match was scheduled for 21 December.

=== 1st ODI ===
31 January
Scorecard

West Indies; 245/5 (50 overs)	v	Sri Lanka
Adrian Barath 113 (129); Lasith Malinga 3/51 (10 overs)

No result
Sinhalese Sports Club Ground, Colombo
Umpires: Asoka de Silva (SL) and Bruce Oxenford (Aus)

- West Indies won the toss and elected to bat.

=== 2nd ODI ===
3 February
Scorecard

West Indies; 203 (50 overs)	v	Sri Lanka; 199/2 (42.3 overs)
Dwayne Bravo 39 (55); Lasith Malinga 3/30 (10 overs)		Upul Tharanga 101* (143); Ravi Rampaul 1/27 (7 overs)

Sri Lanka won by 8 wickets (D/L)
Sinhalese Sports Club Ground, Colombo
Umpires: Kumar Dharmasena (SL) and Bruce Oxenford (Aus)
Player of the match: Upul Tharanga (SL)

- Sri Lanka won the toss and elected to field.
- Rain stopped play in the 15th over of the Sri Lanka innings, with their target revised to 197 from 47 overs.

=== 3rd ODI ===
6 February
Scorecard

Sri Lanka; 277/9 (50 overs)	v	West Indies; 251 (49 overs)
Kumar Sangakkara 75 (105); Sulieman Benn 4/38 (10 overs)		Darren Bravo 79 (91); Ajantha Mendis 4/46 (10 overs)

Sri Lanka won by 26 runs
Sinhalese Sports Club Ground, Colombo
Umpires: Asoka de Silva (SL) and Bruce Oxenford (Aus)
Player of the match: Kumar Sangakkara (SL)

- West Indies won the toss and elected to field.

== Media coverage ==
=== Television ===
- British Eurosport: UK
- Ten Sports : Middle-East, Pakistan, India, Sri Lanka
