= Omar Phillips =

West Indian cricketer

Personal information
- Full name: Omar Jamel Phillips
- Born: 12 October 1986 (age 40); Boscobel, Saint Peter, Barbados
- Nickname: Ramo
- Height: 6 ft 0 in (1.83 m)
- Batting: Left-handed
- Bowling: Right-arm medium pace
- Role: Batsman

International information
- National side: West Indies
- Test debut (cap 277): 9 July 2009 v Bangladesh
- Last Test: 17 July 2009 v Bangladesh

Domestic team information
- Years: Team
- 2007–2011: Combined Campuses and Colleges
- 2012–2018: Barbados

Career statistics
| Competition | Test | FC | LA |
|---|---|---|---|
| Matches | 2 | 57 | 18 |
| Runs scored | 160 | 2,524 | 260 |
| Batting average | 40.00 | 26.56 | 14.44 |
| 100s/50s | 0/1 | 1/13 | 0/1 |
| Top score | 94 | 204 | 62 |
| Catches/stumpings | 1/– | 62/– | 4/– |
- Source: ESPNcricinfo, 10 October 2021

Omar Jamel Phillips (born 12 October 1986) is a West Indian former cricketer who played domestically for the Combined Campuses and Colleges and Barbados as well as appearing in two Test matches for the West Indies. A left-handed opening batsman, he got his Test opportunity following a dispute between the West Indies Cricket Board and the Players' Association. On his debut against Bangladesh he scored 94.

== Career ==
Phillips was born on 12 October 1986 in Boscobel, Saint Peter, Barbados. Having previously represented Jamaica at youth level Phillips made his professional debut in October 2007 when appearing for the newly formed Combined Campuses and Colleges (CCC). He made his one-day debut against Trinidad and Tobago, opening the batting he scored 34. He made his first-class later in the 2007–08 season against Leeward Islands. During the 2008–09 season he was a regular in the CCC team, playing nine matches and scoring 577 runs at an average of 32.05. This included his only first-class century, an innings of 204 against the Leeward Islands which came from 396 balls and included 23 fours and 4 sixes.

Phillips was selected in the West Indies A squad to play Bangladesh in their 2009 tour opener, although he didn't play. On 8 July, he was named in the Test squad following a pay dispute between the West Indies Cricket Board and the Players' Association which led to the first XI boycotting. He made the starting line-up for the first Test at Arnos Vale Stadium, one of seven debutants for the West Indies. In their first innings he top scored with 94, falling six runs short of becoming the sixth Windies batsman to score a century in his first Test innings. He scored 14 in the second innings as the West Indies lost by 95 runs. In the second Test he made 23 and 29 as Bangladesh won again to complete a series victory.

In 2010, Phillips was selected for West Indies A tours of Bangladesh and England. Phillips was captain of the CCC team for the 2010–11 season in which they reached the final of the regional four-day competition. This was his last season with CCC before joining Barbados.

In December 2014, Phillips was struck on the back of the head while at the non-striker's end causing him to lose consciousness for six minutes. He was taken to hospital for tests which cleared him of anything more serious than concussion.

Phillips made his final first-class appearances during the 2016–17 season, before four matches in the 2017–18 Regional Super50 brought an end to his professional cricket career.

At the end of 2018, Phillips took a player/coach role with Stratmore Cricket Club in Melbourne. In December 2022, the West Indies called up Phillips to act as a substitute fielder in the second Test of their tour of Australia as several members of the squad were unavailable.
