= Australian cricket team in the West Indies in 2011–12 =

International cricket tour

Australian cricket team in West Indies in 2012
	West Indies	Australia
- Dates: 16 March 2012 – 27 April 2012
Captains	Darren Sammy	Michael Clarke (Tests); Shane Watson (ODIs); George Bailey (T20Is)

Test series
- Result: Australia won the 3-match series 2–0
Most runs	Shivnarine Chanderpaul (346)	Mike Hussey (219)
Most wickets	Kemar Roach (19)	Nathan Lyon (13)
- Player of the series: Shivnarine Chanderpaul (WI)

One Day International series
- Results: 5-match series drawn 2–2
Most runs	Kieron Pollard (222)	Michael Hussey (174)
Most wickets	Sunil Narine (11); Kemar Roach (11)	Xavier Doherty (11)
- Player of the series: Kieron Pollard (WI)

Twenty20 International series
- Results: 2-match series drawn 1–1
Most runs	Dwayne Smith (73)	Michael Hussey (73)
Most wickets	Fidel Edwards (5); Marlon Samuels (5)	Brett Lee (5)
- Player of the series: Shane Watson (Aus)

The Australian cricket team toured the West Indies from 16 March to 27 April 2012. The tour consisted of two Twenty20 Internationals (T20Is), five One Day Internationals (ODIs) and three Test matches.

== Squads ==
ODIs		T20Is		Tests	
West Indies	Australia	West Indies	Australia	West Indies	Australia
Darren Sammy (c); Dwayne Bravo (vc); Adrian Barath; Carlton Baugh (wk); Tino Best; Devendra Bishoo; Darren Bravo; Johnson Charles; Sunil Narine; Kieron Pollard; Kieran Powell; Kemar Roach; Andre Russell; Marlon Samuels; Dinesh Ramdin (Note: Withdrawn on 11 March 2012 due to injury. Replaced with Carlton Baugh.)	Shane Watson (c); George Bailey; Daniel Christian; Xavier Doherty; Peter Forrest; Ben Hilfenhaus; David Hussey; Michael Hussey; Brett Lee; Nathan Lyon; Clint McKay; Peter Nevill (wk); James Pattinson; Matthew Wade (wk); David Warner; Michael Clarke (Note: Withdrawn due to injury (date unknown)); Brad Haddin (Note: Withdrawn on 15 March 2012)	Darren Sammy (c); Dwayne Bravo (vc); Carlton Baugh (wk); Nkruma Bonner; Danza Hyatt; Johnson Charles; Fidel Edwards; Garey Mathurin; Sunil Narine; Kieron Pollard; Andre Russell; Marlon Samuels; Krishmar Santokie; Dwayne Smith; Darren Bravo (Note: Withdrawn on 29 March 2012 (played first T20), replaced with Danza Hyatt.)	George Bailey (c); Shane Watson (vc); Daniel Christian; Xavier Doherty; Peter Forrest; David Hussey; Michael Hussey; Brett Lee; Nathan Lyon; Clint McKay; Peter Nevill (wk); James Pattinson; Matthew Wade (wk); David Warner	Darren Sammy (c); Adrian Barath; Carlton Baugh (wk); Assad Fudadin; Kraigg Brathwaite; Darren Bravo; Shivnarine Chanderpaul; Narsingh Deonarine; Fidel Edwards; Ravi Rampaul; Kemar Roach; Kieran Powell (Note: Withdrawn on 21 March 2012 (played first 3 ODIs), replaced with Adrian Barath); Shane Shillingford (Note: Added on 12 April 2012 (did not play first Test)); Devendra Bishoo (Note: Withdrawn on 19 April 2012 (played first 2 Tests), replaced with Assad Fudadin.); Kirk Edwards (Note: Withdrawn on 19 April 2012 due to injury (played first 2 Tests))	Michael Clarke (c); Shane Watson (vc); Michael Beer; Ed Cowan; Peter Forrest; Ryan Harris; Ben Hilfenhaus; Michael Hussey; Nathan Lyon; Peter Nevill (wk); James Pattinson; Ricky Ponting; Peter Siddle; Mitchell Starc; Matthew Wade (wk); David Warner; Brad Haddin

== Tour Match ==
=== WICB President's XI v Australians ===
2–4 April 2012
Scorecard

WICB President's XI	v	Australians
201 (68.2 overs); Dwayne Smith 62 (73); Ryan Harris 4/23 (13 overs)		9/214d (64 overs); Peter Forrest 53 (113); Ryan Austin 3/43 (17 overs); Nkrumah Bonner 3/43 (11 overs)
98 (33 overs); Carlton Baugh 27 (45); Ben Hilfenhaus 4/8 (7 overs)		2/87 (22.5 overs); Ed Cowan 28* (62); Jason Holder 1/17 (7 overs)

Australians won by 8 wickets
Three Ws Oval, Bridgetown, Barbados
Umpires: Greogory Brathwaite (WI) and Joel Wilson (WI)

- WICB President's XI won the toss and elected to bat.

== ODI series ==
=== 1st ODI ===
16 March 2012
Scorecard

Australia; 204/8 (50 overs)	v	West Indies; 140 (32.2 overs)
George Bailey 48 (67); Dwayne Bravo 3/58 (10 overs)		Darren Sammy 35 (20); Xavier Doherty 4/49 (8 overs)

Australia won by 64 runs
Arnos Vale Stadium, Kingstown, Saint Vincent
Umpires: Kumar Dharmasena (SL) and Peter Nero (WI)
Player of the match: George Bailey (Aus)

- Australia won the toss and elected to bat.
- Johnson Charles (WI) and George Bailey (Aus) both made their ODI debuts.

=== 2nd ODI ===
18 March 2012
Scorecard

Australia; 154/9 (40 overs)	v	West Indies; 163/5 (38.2 overs)
David Hussey 37 (62); Sunil Narine 4/27 (8 overs)		Kieron Pollard 47 (61); Shane Watson 1/28 (7 overs)

West Indies won by 5 wickets (D/L method)
Arnos Vale Stadium, Kingstown, Saint Vincent
Umpires: Shavir Tarapore (Ind) and Gregory Brathwaite (WI)
Player of the match: Sunil Narine (WI)

- West Indies won the toss and elected to field.

=== 3rd ODI ===
20 March 2012
Scorecard

Australia; 220 (49.5 overs)	v	West Indies; 220 (49.4 overs)
Michael Hussey 67 (95); Sunil Narine 3/32 (9.5 overs)		Johnson Charles 45 (77); Shane Watson 3/30 (10 overs)

Match tied
Arnos Vale Stadium, Kingstown, Saint Vincent
Umpires: Kumar Dharmasena (SL) and Peter Nero (WI)
Player of the match: Michael Hussey (Aus)

- Australia won the toss and elected to bat.

=== 4th ODI ===
23 March 2012
Scorecard

West Indies; 294/7 (50 overs)	v	Australia; 252 (46.3 overs)
Kieron Pollard 102 (70); Shane Watson 2/55 (10 overs)		Brett Lee 59 (48); Andre Russell 2/34 (7 overs)

West Indies won by 42 runs
Beausejour Stadium, Gros Islet, St Lucia
Umpires: Shavir Tarapore (Ind) and Gregory Brathwaite (WI)
Player of the match: Kieron Pollard (WI)

- Australia won the toss and elected to field

=== 5th ODI ===
25 March 2012
Scorecard

Australia; 281/9 (50 overs)	v	West Indies; 251 (47.2 overs)
David Warner 69 (81); Andre Russell 4/61 (9 overs)		Darren Sammy 84 (50); Brett Lee 3/42 (9 overs)

Australia won by 30 runs
Beausejour Stadium, Gros Islet, St Lucia
Umpires: Kumar Dharmasena (SL) and Peter Nero (WI)
Player of the match: Darren Sammy (WI)

- West Indies won the toss and elected to field

== T20I series ==
=== 1st T20I ===
27 March 2012
Scorecard

West Indies; 150/7 (20 overs)	v	Australia; 153/2 (18.1 overs)
Kieron Pollard 54* (26); Daniel Christian 3/27 (3 overs)		Shane Watson 69 (43); Krishmar Santokie 1/27 (3 overs)

Australia won by 8 wickets
Beausejour Stadium, Gros Islet, St Lucia
Umpires: Gregory Brathwaite (WI) and Peter Nero (WI)
Player of the match: Shane Watson (Aus)

- West Indies won the toss and elected to bat.
- Sunil Narine (WI) made his T20I debut.

=== 2nd T20I ===
30 March 2012
Scorecard

West Indies; 160 (19.4 overs)	v	Australia; 146/9 (20 overs)
Dwayne Smith 63 (34); Brett Lee 3/23 (3.4 overs)		David Warner 58 (43); Fidel Edwards 3/23 (3 overs); Marlon Samuels 3/23 (3 overs)

West Indies won by 14 runs
Kensington Oval, Bridgetown, Barbados
Umpires: Peter Nero (WI) and Joel Wilson (WI)
Player of the match: Dwayne Smith (WI)

- West Indies won the toss and elected to bat.

== Test series ==
=== 1st Test ===
7–11 April 2012
Scorecard

West Indies	v	Australia
449/9d (153 overs); Shivnarine Chanderpaul 103* (248); David Warner 2/45 (10 overs)		406/9d (145 overs); Michael Clarke 73 (173); Kemar Roach 3/72 (29 overs)
148 (66.4 overs); Darren Bravo 32 (78); Ryan Harris 3/31 (8.4 overs)		192/7 (47 overs); Shane Watson 52 (57); Narsingh Deonarine 4/53 (11 overs)

Australia won by 3 wickets
Kensington Oval, Bridgetown, Barbados
Umpires: Ian Gould (Eng) and Tony Hill (NZ)
Player of the match: Ryan Harris (Aus)

- West Indies won the toss and elected to bat.
- Match delayed on Days 1, 2, 3, 4 and 5 due to bad light and rain.
- Matthew Wade (Aus) made his Test debut.

=== 2nd Test ===
15–19 April 2012
Scorecard

Australia	v	West Indies
311 (135 overs); Michael Hussey 73 (207); Kemar Roach 5/105 (27 overs)		257 (104.4 overs); Shivnarine Chanderpaul 94 (217); Nathan Lyon 5/68 (29 overs)
160/8d (61.5 overs); Ricky Ponting 41 (85); Kemar Roach 5/41 (18 overs)		53/2 (11 overs); Darren Sammy 30* (26); Ben Hilfenhaus 2/22 (4 overs)

Match drawn
Queen's Park Oval, Port of Spain, Trinidad
Umpires: Marais Erasmus (SA) and Ian Gould (Eng)
Player of the match: Kemar Roach (WI)

- Australia won the toss and elected to bat.
- Rain and bad light on Day 2 reduced play to 70 overs.
- Rain on Day 3 reduced play to 79 overs.
- Rain on Day 4 reduced play to 31 overs.
- Rain on Day 5 reduced play to 43 overs.

=== 3rd Test ===
23–27 April 2012
Scorecard

Australia	v	West Indies
328 (114.5 overs); Matthew Wade 106 (146); Shane Shillingford 6/119 (42.5 overs)		218 (87.2 overs); Shivnarine Chanderpaul 68 (164); Nathan Lyon 4/69 (33 overs)
259 (85 overs); Ricky Ponting 57 (130); Shane Shillingford 4/100 (39 overs)		294 (96.3 overs); Shivnarine Chanderpaul 69 (122); Michael Clarke 5/86 (23 overs)

Australia won by 75 runs
Windsor Park, Roseau, Dominica
Umpires: Marais Erasmus (SA) and Tony Hill (NZ)
Player of the match: Matthew Wade (Aus)

- Australia won the toss and elected to bat.
- Matthew Wade (Aus) scored his first century in Tests.
