= Saghir Hossain =

Bangladeshi cricketer (born 1986)

Personal information
- Full name: Gazi Saghir Hossain
- Born: 19 August 1986 (age 40)
- Batting: Right-handed
- Role: Wicket-keeper batsman

Domestic team information
- Years: Team
- 2004–2012: Khulna Division
- 2014–2016: Dhaka Division
- 2008–2013: Dhaka Metropolis
- 2007–2011: Abahani Limited

Career statistics
Competition	FC	LA	T20
Matches	99	79	16
Runs scored	3900	1097	67
Batting average	24.52	18.28	8.37
100s/50s	2/17	0/6	0/0
Top score	114	75*	21
Balls bowled	114	–	–
Wickets	4	–	–
Bowling average	28.00	–	–
5 wickets in innings	0	–	–
10 wickets in match	0	–	–
Best bowling	1/9	–	–
Catches/stumpings	249/36	60/24	6/7
- Source: ESPN Cricinfo, 20 May 2022

Gazi Saghir Hossain (born 19 August 1986) is a Bangladeshi wicket-keeper batsman, who made his first-class debut in 2005 in the East Zone v Bangladesh Cricket Board XI game. He is a right-handed batsman.

== Career ==
He represented Khulna Division and Dhaka Division in National Cricket League, and Dhaka Metropolis in domestic T20 cricket Prior to that, he was also a part of the Bangladesh Under-19 squad.

In February 2005, he made his List A debut for Khulna Division. In June 2008, he made T20 debut for Bangladesh A.

Hossain has over 3500 first-class runs to his name. He has also played for the Bangladesh A team and got his first breakthrough in 2009 for the tour against West Indies. He has been drafted into the side several times as a reserve wicketkeeper, a back-up for Mushfiqur Rahim but has not played an international game so far.
