= Daren Sammy =

West Indian cricketer (born 1983)

Daren Sammy SLC, OBE, N.Pk
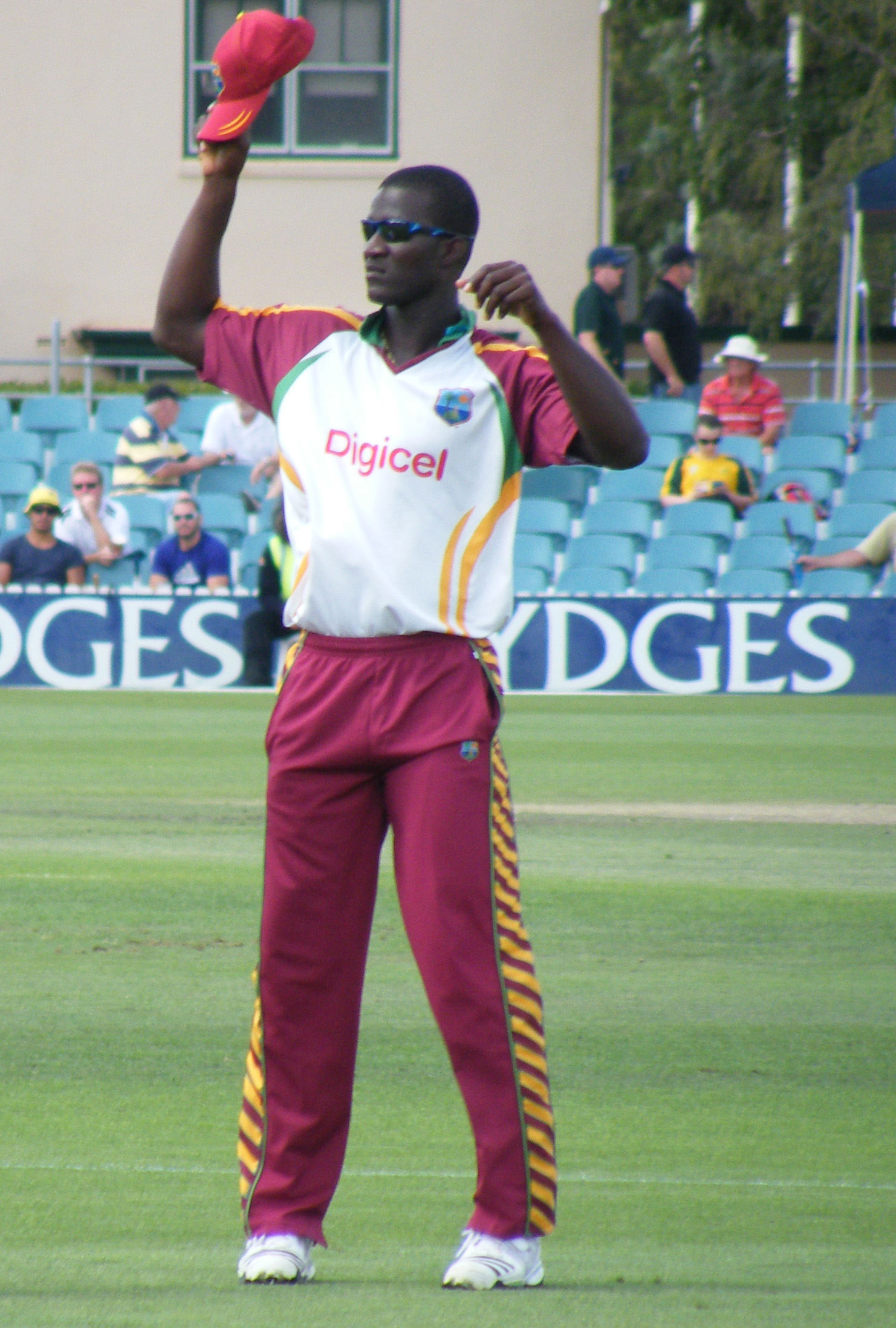
- Sammy playing against the Invitational Prime Minister's XI in Canberra, Australia in 2010

Personal information
- Full name: Daren Julius Garvey Sammy
- Born: 20 December 1983 (age 42); Micoud, Saint Lucia
- Height: 6 ft 5 in (196 cm)
- Batting: Right-handed
- Bowling: Right-arm medium-fast
- Role: All-rounder

International information
- National sides: West Indies (2004–2016); World XI (2017)
- Test debut (cap 266): 7 June 2007; West Indies v England
- Last Test: 19 December 2013; West Indies v New Zealand
- ODI debut (cap 124): 8 July 2004; West Indies v New Zealand
- Last ODI: 21 March 2015; West Indies v New Zealand
- ODI shirt no.: 88
- T20I debut (cap 14): 28 June 2007; West Indies v England
- Last T20I: 15 September 2017; World XI v Pakistan
- T20I shirt no.: 88

Domestic team information
- Years: Team
- 2002/03–2016/17: Windward Islands
- 2013–2014: Sunrisers Hyderabad
- 2013–2020: St Lucia Zouks
- 2014: Glamorgan
- 2014: Titans
- 2014/15–2015/16: Hobart Hurricanes
- 2015: Royal Challengers Bangalore
- 2015: Nottinghamshire
- 2015: Rangpur Riders
- 2016–2020: Peshawar Zalmi
- 2016: Hampshire
- 2016–2017: Rajshahi Kings

Head coaching information
- Years: Team
- 2020–2023: Peshawar Zalmi
- 2023–present: West Indies

Career statistics
Competition	Test	ODI	T20I	FC
Matches	38	126	68	96
Runs scored	1,323	1,871	587	3,549
Batting average	21.68	24.94	17.26	23.81
100s/50s	1/5	0/9	0/0	2/22
Top score	106	89	42*	121
Balls bowled	6,215	4,956	916	13,744
Wickets	84	81	44	217
Bowling average	35.79	47.54	25.36	29.08
5 wickets in innings	4	0	1	10
10 wickets in match	0	0	0	0
Best bowling	7/66	4/26	5/26	7/66
Catches/stumpings	65/–	67/–	31/–	137/–
Medal record
Men's Cricket
Representing West Indies
ICC Champions Trophy
Winner	2004 England
ICC Men's T20 World Cup
Winner	2012 Sri Lanka
Winner	2016 India
- Source: ESPNcricinfo, 19 March 2019

Daren Julius Garvey Sammy SLC, OBE, N.Pk (born 20 December 1983) is a Saint Lucian former cricketer who played international cricket for the West Indies. He is head coach of the West Indies cricket team. On making his One-Day International (ODI) debut against Bangladesh in 2004, Sammy became the first person from St Lucia to play international cricket. Three years later he made his Test debut against England, taking 7/66 which were the best bowling figures for a West Indian in his first Test since Alf Valentine in 1950. Under his captaincy West Indies won the 2012 and 2016 ICC WorldTwenty20. He is the only captain to win the T20 World Cup twice. He was also a member of the West Indies team that won the 2004 ICC Champions Trophy.

He captained West Indies to the 2012 ICC World Twenty20 victory against Sri Lanka, West Indies' first major trophy for 8 years (having won the ICC Champions trophy against England in 2004). Sammy again captained West Indies to victory in the 2016 ICC World Twenty20 against England. Sammy captained Peshawar Zalmi in the Pakistan Super League from 2017 until 2020, when he stepped down due to fitness. He then agreed to a two-year head coaching contract for Peshawar Zalmi.

In August 2016, Sammy was informed he was being dropped as T20I captain of West Indies.

In the 2017 Birthday Honours, Sammy was appointed Officer of the Order of the British Empire (OBE) for services to sports.

For his part in bringing back international cricket to Pakistan, Sammy received the highest civilian medal of Pakistan, Nishan-e-Pakistan in March 2020. He was also awarded honorary Pakistani citizenship by the President of Pakistan Arif Alvi.

In June 2021, Sammy was appointed as a member of the Cricket West Indies (CWI) Board of Directors as an independent non-member director.

== Early life ==
Daren Sammy was raised in the Seventh-day Adventist Church by his parents Wilson and Clara. His mother wanted him to become a pastor in the church. He was educated at Micoud Combined School, Emmanuel SDA Combined School and Vieux Fort Comprehensive Secondary School. Sammy while growing up played with Garey Mathurin, Gaspard Prospere, Joachim George and others.

== Debut ==
On 2 October 2001, Sammy made his List A debut at the age of 17. Playing in the Red Stripe Bowl for the Northern Windward Islands against Jamaica he bowled nine overs without taking a wicket and scored 25 runs before he was run out as his team slid to defeat. Playing three matches Sammy was his team's second-highest run-scorer with 90 runs, and took one wicket. Sammy was a member of the West Indies team to the 2002 Under-19 World Cup, which was held that year in New Zealand; he made 22 runs and took three wickets. Other members of that team, which lost to Australia in the semi-final, included Dwayne Bravo, Narsingh Deonarine, Ravi Rampaul, Shane Shillingford, Lendl Simmons, and Gavin Tonge all of whom went on to play for the West Indies senior team.

Upon his return from New Zealand, Sammy was picked to attend the Shell Cricket Academy at St. George's University in Grenada in 2002. The scheme aimed to help what were considered the Caribbean's "brightest cricketing prospects" develop skills to help them professionally, including areas such as money management to complement their cricketing ability. Other notable players in that class – just a handful would go on to play senior cricket for West Indies – included Dwayne Smith, Narsingh Deonarine, Carlton Baugh, Daren Powell, and Omari Banks.

On 31 January 2003, Sammy made his first-class debut for the Windward Islands against Barbados in the 2002/03 Carib Beer Cup. Batting at number seven, he scored no runs before being dismissed by spin bowler Sulieman Benn in the first innings, but fared better in the second, scoring 25 and falling to Benn again. Sammy bowled six overs in the match without taking a wicket. He played one further match in that season's cup, again succumbing for a duck in the first innings and failing to take a wicket. In the second innings he recorded his maiden first-class half-century, scoring 53 runs from 70 balls before he was dismissed by spin bowler Mahendra Nagamootoo. At the start of the 2003 season in England, Sammy joined the Marylebone Cricket Club (MCC) Young Cricketers. Whilst still a member of the Young Cricketers, Sammy was called to the West Indies to join the University of the West Indies Vice Chancellor's XI against England in a warm-up match.

== International cricket career ==
=== First international experience ===
Following a successful domestic season in which Sammy finished as the Windward Islands' second highest wicket-taker in the Regional Four Day Competition with 22 scalps and 261 runs, he was the only uncapped player selected in the 15-man West Indies squad for the NatWest Triangular One Day International Series with England and New Zealand in June 2004. Counting in favour of his selection was Sammy's experience of English conditions: in 2003 he played for Barnes Cricket Club in the Middlesex Premier Cricket League. He subsequently earned his first West Indies cap in odd circumstances. Due to heavy rain the West Indies' match against New Zealand at the Rose Bowl was abandoned without a ball being bowled. But the captains had already completed the toss, and the fixture counts in ICC records as Sammy's first match.

In September, Sammy was recalled to the senior team in place of 22-year-old Jamaican fast bowler Jermaine Lawson who withdrew from the Champions Trophy squad with a stress fracture of the lower back. Sammy, at the age of 20, became the first international cricketer to emerge from St Lucia. For his actual playing debut, back at the Rose Bowl, Sammy took 1 wicket for 19 runs (1/19) off six overs and held on to three catches as West Indies beat Bangladesh by 138 runs. It was the only match Sammy played in the tournament. The West Indies went on to win the trophy, beating England in the final.

=== Early international career ===
When the West Indies toured India in January 2007 Sammy was included in the squad, with a chance to make his Test debut. However, shortly before the team departed, he suffered an injury that ruled him out of the tour. After that set-back, Sammy travelled to England in April and May where he played in the Central Lancashire League ahead of the West Indies' tour of the country in May. He was selected in the touring squad. This time, the team won the NatWest limited overs series. And the 23-year-old St Lucian won his first Test cap in the third Test match at Old Trafford on 7 June. He claimed his first Test wicket when he dismissed Alastair Cook caught by Dwayne Bravo, but his first innings was unremarkable save for his economy, giving up just 1.88 runs per over off 17 completed overs. In the second innings, though, Sammy caught England captain Michael Vaughan off his own bowling, with the England score 99/2. In his 17th over, he had Ian Bell caught behind by Ramdin. Next ball he had Matt Prior by the same route. A couple of balls later, on the same score he dismissed Liam Plunkett, caught by Bravo. Five wickets gone, four to Sammy, three in five balls. He continued his excellent debut, capturing the wickets of Steve Harmison and Monty Panesar, before snagging Paul Collingwood to end with seven wickets for 66 runs. His bowling figures were the best at Old Trafford since Malcolm Marshall's 7/22 in 1988, and the best by any West Indian on debut since Alf Valentine took 8/102 in 1950.

As an all-rounder Sammy did not cover himself in glory on that tour, averaging just 14.20 runs from 10 innings, twice unbeaten. He had just the tenth highest aggregate on a tour that included matches against Scotland and the Netherlands. As a bowler, he excelled with a team-best average of 17.72, 18 wickets (third on the team) from 93.5 overs (five other players bowled more overs than Sammy).

Sammy was called up to the Stanford Superstars, a team compiled by American billionaire Allen Stanford, when Dwayne Bravo pulled out with an injury. He was not slated to play the first game, but Shivnarine Chanderpaul had a neck strain that precluded his participation. So all Sammy did was to provide electric fielding and consistent bowling to force his way into the team. As expected, the Superstars made it to the series finale to face England. The prize money at stake was US$20 million, $1 million each to the players on the winning team. Bowling first, the Superstars dismissed England for 99 runs. Sammy took 2/13 and made one catch. He did not bat in the series.

During the 2008/09 Regional Four Day Competition, Sammy played seven matches for the Windward Islands, scoring 476 runs at an average of 43.27 (the second highest for the club that season) and recording his maiden first-class century. His innings of 121 came from 140 balls and was scored against Barbados who were fielding a bowling line up including Tino Best, Kemar Roach, and Corey Collymore who all had international experience. During the innings he also passed 2,000 runs in first-class cricket. Sammy took 23 wickets in the competition at an average of 21.65.

In July 2009, there was a pay dispute between the West Indies players and the West Indies Cricket Board (WICB). An understrength squad was picked for the series against Bangladesh. Of the 15 players named, nine were uncapped; Sammy was appointed vice-captain and in the Test seven West Indies players made their debut. The West Indies lost the series 2–0 as Bangladesh secured their first overseas series win. Sammy was the West Indies second-highest wicket-taker in the series with 12 wickets at an average of 17.33. he also scored 90 runs at an average of 22.50.

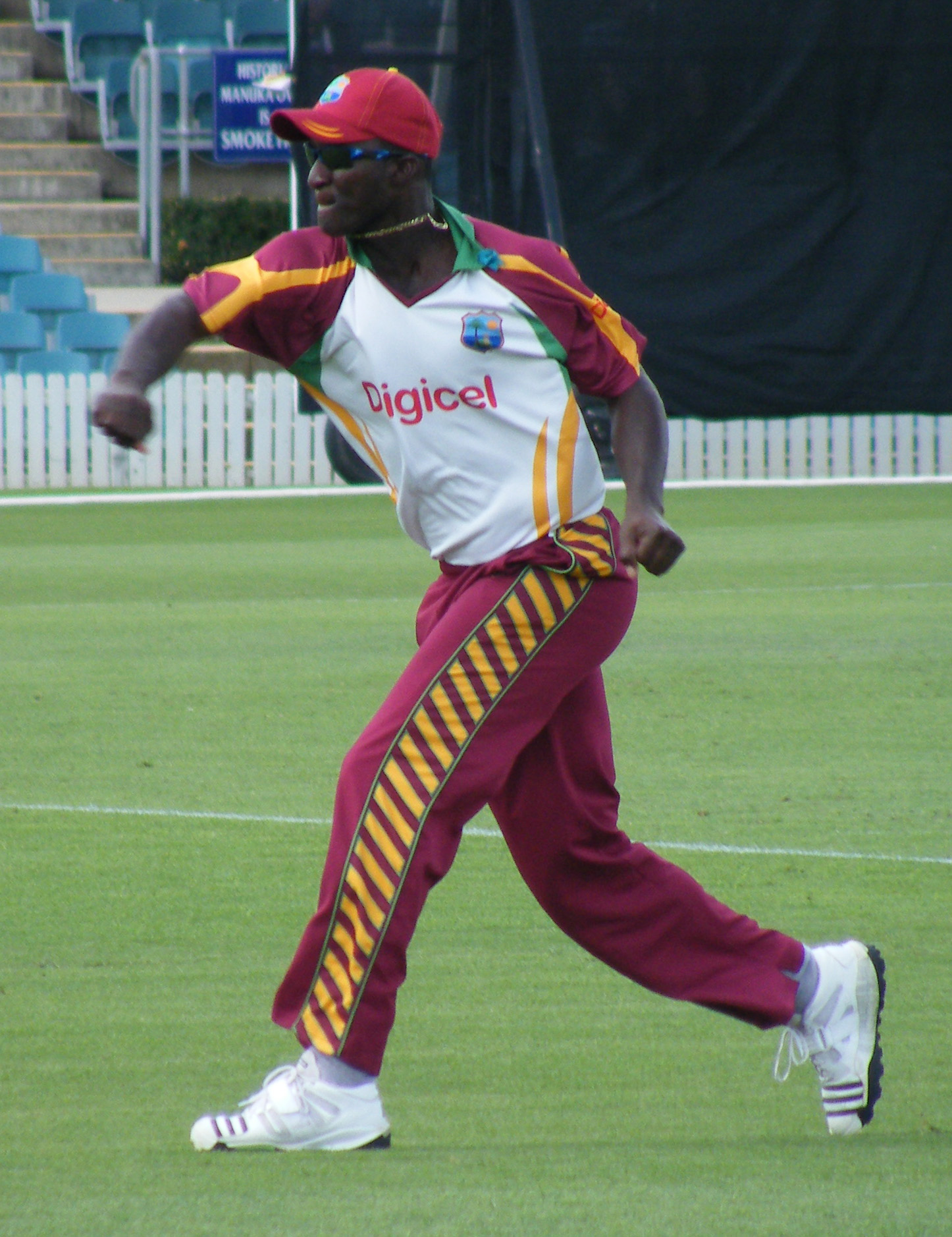
Sammy training in February 2010 during the West Indies' tour of Australia

The WICB announced its central contracts in November 2009, and Sammy was included in the 33-man list. He was given a Grade B contract (the second-highest level) worth $80,000. His career-best Man of the Match figures of 4–26 in the third ODI in Saint Vincent & the Grenadines would have been more flattering still had captain Chris Gayle been able to hold on to a catch that would have given the tall Saint Lucian the distinction of becoming the first West Indian to take a five-fer in every form of the game; he had 5–26 off the same opponents in a Twenty20 International earlier in the series. West Indies bowled Zimbabwe for 104, having made 245.

In the fourth ODI, Sammy took 1–24 as West Indies won by four wickets; in the final match, he had 3–33 as West Indies again won by four wickets. Sammy finished the series as West Indies' joint top wicket-taker, himself and Kemar Roach sharing 16 scalps equally.

Playing at home, the West Indies had high hopes for the 2010 version of the Twenty20 competition. The tournament did not start off too badly, Sammy scoring 30 as the West Indies made 138–9 against Ireland, then capturing 3–8 and holding on to a record four catches as Ireland were routed for just 68, the second-lowest total in Twenty20s, and losing by 70 runs. But eventually West Indies were knocked out of contention when they were drubbed by Australia at Beausejour Cricket Ground in Saint Lucia. He had a forgettable match in front of his home crowd, but overall, Sammy had had a good series. He ended with 51 runs in four innings, the fourth highest aggregate for West Indies, and his 12.75 was the seventh best average. But as a bowler, his six wickets and average of 12.0 topped the West Indies, and his economy rate of 5.26 runs per over was second.

In the second ODI against South Africa at the Sir Vivian Richards Stadium in Antigua-Barbuda, West Indies appeared well on their way to a second consecutive loss. 200–6 in the 41st over, well short of their winning target of 301, Sammy joined Dwayne Bravo at the crease. But six sixes and two fours later, it looked as though West Indies might just win. Sammy had amassed 58 runs, the fifty coming up off just twenty deliveries. It was the fastest fifty ever by a West Indies player, and more importantly, it had brought West Indies within reach of victory. But successive run-outs – Denesh Ramdin, Ravi Rampaul and Nikita Miller all went by that route – left Sammy stranded and the West Indies 17 runs shy.

=== West Indies captain ===
On 17 October 2010 Sammy was named captain of the West Indies Test team for its tour to Sri Lanka and until the end of the 2011 season, replacing Chris Gayle. At the time Sammy had played 8 Tests and 41 ODIs. The previous captain and vice, Chris Gayle and Dwayne Bravo respectively, had chosen not to sign central contracts with the West Indies Cricket Board and were replaced. Between January 2004 and the start of the tour to Sri Lanka in November, the West Indies had won just five of their previous 62 Tests and were expected to lose the three match series against a team with a good home record. In a series shortened by poor weather Sammy scored 10 runs and took two wickets at an average of 75.50, and while he said he wanted to improve his own performance Sammy stated that he was pleased with the 0–0 result of the series. In the 2–0 defeat to Sri Lanka in the subsequent ODI series, Sammy scored 28 runs and sent down 19 wicketless overs.

Sammy's record as captain as of 30 April 2013
	Matches	Won	Lost	Drawn	Tied	No result
Test	25	8	8	9	0	–
ODI	51	19	30	–	1	1
T20I	21	12	7	–	1	1

Pakistan toured the West Indies in April and May 2011 for a T20I, five ODIs, and two Tests. In the first match of the Test series West Indies secured their first victory since 2009, ending a 17-match run without a win. Sammy took seven wickets in the match, including five in Pakistan's second innings, and was named Man of the Match for his performance. West Indies lost the second match, drawing the series 1–1; Sammy was his team's second-highest wicket-taker, claiming ten at an average of 17.90. The following month Sammy was named T20I player of the year at the West Indies Players' Association awards. When India toured in June and July the West Indies lost the Test series 1–0. ESPNcricinfo recorded that Sammy led with passion and "bowled his heart out"; he finished with seven wickets from three matches at an average of 38.28. While playing, Sammy had to deal with distractions from hostile crowds and pundits who criticised his appointment as captain as some believed he could not hold down a place as a player alone.

Initially named as captain until the end of the 2011 season, Sammy was retained as captain across all formats for the tours of Bangladesh and India. In October Sammy's Grade B central contract was renewed; he was one of four players with a Grade B contract, the second highest category (Shivnarine Chanderpaul was the only player with a Grade A). Later that month, the West Indies toured Bangladesh. Sammy missed the first ODI through illness, but returned to captain the team in the remaining two. West Indies won the series 2–1 and Sammy took two wickets. The first Test was curtailed by rain and ended in a draw, and Sammy top-scored for his team. Having played 17 Tests, the innings of 58 runs from 43 balls was Sammy's first half-century in the format. West Indies won the second Test to take the series, and in the process Sammy dismissed Bangladesh all-rounder Shakib Al Hasan to claim his 50th Test wicket.

Following on from the Bangladesh series, the West Indies moved on to India in November for three Tests and five ODIs. West Indies lost the Test series 2–0 and Sammy finished as his team's highest wicket-taker with nine at an average of 34.77. In the ODI series, Sammy took a single wicket from 21.5 overs as West Indies succumbed to a 4–1 defeat. The West Indies faced Australia in a five-match ODI series in March 2012. Sammy's team won the second match by five wickets, ending a series of 13 defeats against Australia that extended back to 2006. The West Indies entered the final match with a 2–1 lead and a chance to register their first series win against Australia since 1995. In the event Australia won by 30 runs, but the margin of victory was smaller than it would have been had Sammy not scored 84 runs from 50 deliveries, his highest score in the format and an effort for which he was named Man of the Match. In the Test series that followed, Sammy managed just five wickets from three matches at an average just above forty. As a batsman he was more successful, and was one of three West Indies batsmen to score more than 150 runs in the series. With the West Indies on 13/2 chasing 215 to win from 61 overs on the final day of the second Test, Sammy promoted himself up the batting order to number three to accelerate the scoring rate. He managed 30 not out from 26 deliveries before rain intervened and the match ended in a draw. West Indies lost the third Test by 75 runs to lose the series 2–0, but during his team's chase of 370 to win on the final day Sammy scored his second Test half-century, 61 from 51 deliveries, bettering his previous highest Test score of 58.

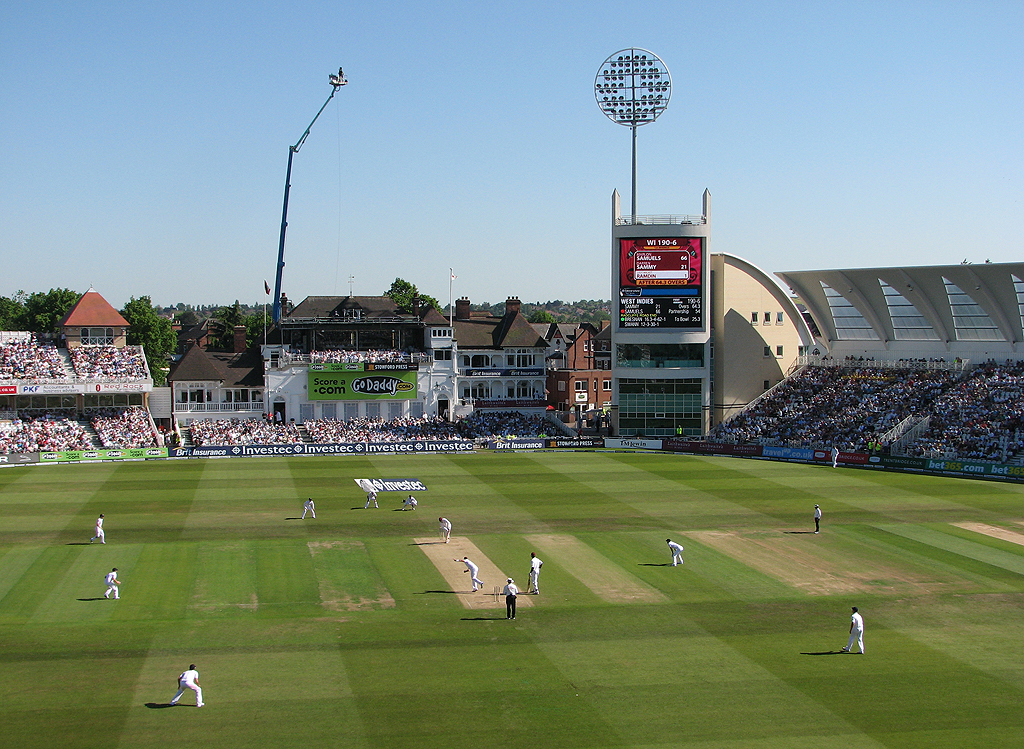
Sammy and Marlon Samuels batting against England at Trent Bridge in May 2012. During the 204-run partnership Sammy scored his only Test century.

The 2011/12 season saw Sammy improve as a batsman: in the series against India and Australia Sammy scored over 100 runs, which he had not done previously in a Test series. This trend continued when the West Indies toured England in May 2012. Sammy began the series with scores of 17 and 37 in the first Test at Lord's, during which he passed 3,000 runs in first-class cricket. In the following Test, in his 26th Test, Sammy registered his maiden Test century. It was just the seventh time a number eight batsman had scored a century for the West Indies. Sammy partnered Marlon Samuels in a 204-run stand, the second-highest for the West Indies' seventh wicket. The West Indies lost the Test and drew the next one to lose the series 2–0; Sammy finished with 201 runs from five innings and was his team's third highest run-scorer in the series while his six wickets cost 48.50 runs each. Commenting on Sammy's performance in the series, former West Indies captain Viv Richards said "All of a sudden there was this new-found confidence. You need to have a leader who can come out to the middle and make some sort of contribution. He has done enough and should not feel he has one foot in and one foot out as far as the leadership in concerned. He has done his bit to provide a winning environment."

New Zealand toured the West Indies between June and August 2012. The fixtures included two Tests, five ODIs, and two T20Is, and the West Indies won every match apart from the third ODI. Sammy guided the team to their first Test series victory since 2009 against a Test team other than minnows Bangladesh and Zimbabwe. He carried on his good form with the bat, scoring a half-century in the first Test.

Sammy led the West Indies in the 2012 World Twenty20 hosted by Sri Lanka. For the first time in a long time, the West Indies were considered realistic contenders for the title, a measure of how the team has matured under the auspices of Sammy. However, it was as an individual player that he came under scrutiny in the tournament. In the journey from group stages to the final, Sammy contributed 27 runs with the bat from four visits to the crease and overall bowling figures of 2/125, and drew a lot of criticism as many people felt he was keeping better players out of the team. But in the final, when it mattered most, Sammy scored 26 not out from 15 balls and took two key wickets (almost matching his batting and bowling tally for the rest of the tournament) to help his team overcome a slow start and defeat Sri Lanka.

In the 2013 ICC Champions Trophy he along with Kemar Roach set the record for the highest 10th wicket partnership in ICC Champions Trophy history (51*)

In March 2016, Sammy captained West Indies to victory in the 2016 edition of ICC World Twenty20, beating England in the final in India.

On 6 April 2016, Beauséjour Cricket Ground, a cricket ground located near Gros Islet, St Lucia having a seating capacity of 15,000 was renamed to the Darren Sammy National Cricket Stadium.

In August 2016 he was dropped as T20I captain and the chairman of selectors said he did not merit a place in the West Indies squad. Carlos Brathwaite replaced him for the T20I leadership role.

In August 2017, he was named in a World XI team to play three Twenty20 International matches against Pakistan in the 2017 Independence Cup in Lahore.

== Domestic and T20 franchise career ==
At the launch of the Caribbean Premier League Sammy was announced as a franchise player for the 2013 tournament.

Sammy played professionally in the Indian Premier League for Hyderabad, and he was made captain of that franchise in 2014. For the 2015 edition, he was released by Hyderabad, and subsequently signed by Royal Challengers Bangalore. He was then picked up by Kings XI Punjab for the 2017 tournament.

The Chief Minister of Khyber Pakhtunkhwa, Pervaiz Khattak, offered the all-rounder honorary Pakistani citizenship in response to a special request by Peshawar Zalmi ownership, which Sammy accepted. Sammy played for Peshawar Zalmi in the inaugural Pakistan Super League in 2016. In the 2017 PSL draft, he was retained by Peshawar Zalmi. During the draft, captain Shahid Afridi made the announcement of naming Sammy the new captain of Peshawar Zalmi. With Sammy as its captain, the team won the second edition of the PSL.

In May 2018, he was named as one of the ten marquee players for the first edition of the Global T20 Canada cricket tournament. On 3 June 2018, he was selected to play for the Toronto Nationals in the players' draft for the inaugural edition of the tournament. In June 2019, he was selected to play for the Brampton Wolves franchise team in the 2019 Global T20 Canada tournament. In July 2020, he was named in the St Lucia Zouks squad for the 2020 Caribbean Premier League.

== Coaching career ==
During the 2020 Pakistan Super League, Sammy was named as Peshawar Zalmi's head coach and he retained the position during the 2021 season. He was reappointed as Zalmi's head coach for the 2023 season.

In May 2023, Sammy was named as the head coach of the West Indies cricket team in limited overs cricket.

== Playing style ==
I have the term allrounder because I bowl, I bat and I field, but in reality I'm not really one thing or the other.

— Daren Sammy, June 2007

Sammy has a reputation for bowling long spells and his medium-fast pace bowling is used to support strike bowlers. He has commented that "We all have roles in the team and I've clearly understood what my role is in the team, which is to build pressure and be the workhorse of the team. I've accepted that and that's how I've played throughout my career." He aims to do this by bowling dot balls to create pressure. Sammy feels that because he is a support bowler batsmen relax against him and are more prone to make mistakes. A consistent bowler, though he does not move the ball much Sammy delivers the ball with an upright seam and uses the crease to vary his angle of delivery. As a batsman, his strike-rate in ODIs of 98.11 is the second highest amongst West Indian players who have faced at least 500 deliveries (behind all-rounder Andre Russell on 119.34), and in ODI innings of at least 25 runs holds the second, third, and fourth highest strike rates of West Indian players.

== Personal life ==
Sammy married his girlfriend Cathy Daniel in 2010. He has four children. He has established the Darren Sammy Foundation that works with the youth by giving them scholarships. In 2018, Sammy became the face of Chairman's Reserve. In 2022, he joined Jomboy Media to become a commentator on their cricket series that combines elements of cricket and blitzball into one sport.

== See also ==
- List of West Indies cricketers who have taken five-wicket hauls on Test debut
