= 2009 ICC Champions Trophy =

One day International cricket tournament

- Dates: 22 September – 5 October 2009
- Administrator: International Cricket Council
- Cricket format: One Day International
- Tournament format(s): Round-robin and knockout
- Host: South Africa
- Champions: Australia (2nd title)
- Runners-up: New Zealand
- Participants: 8
- Matches: 15
- Player of the series: (Australia) Ricky Ponting
- Most runs: (Australia) Ricky Ponting (288)
- Most wickets: (South Africa) Wayne Parnell (11)

The 2009 ICC Champions Trophy was a One Day International cricket tournament held in South Africa between 22 September and 5 October, at Wanderers Stadium and Centurion Park, both in the Gauteng province. Originally, the tournament was scheduled to be hosted by Pakistan in 2008, but due to security concerns it shifted to South Africa. It was the sixth ICC Champions Trophy, and was previously known as the ICC Knock-out. Two teams from two groups of four qualified for the semi-finals, and the final was staged in Centurion on 5 October. Australia successfully defended the title by beating New Zealand by six wickets in the final.

== History ==
The Champions Trophy was the brainchild of Jagmohan Dalmiya, who was ICC president in the late 1990s. It had a dual aim of spreading the game to emerging nations and raising money for the ICC between World Cups, thus enabling it to pump more cash into those fledgling cricket countries. The first tournament, labelled as a mini World Cup, was staged in Dhaka in October 1998 and raised more than £10 million. The second, in Nairobi, was a commercial success, although the crowds stayed away. By the time the 2002 event was held – and there was disquiet as it was so close to the World Cup five months later – the idea of playing in developing nations had been ditched. As revenue generation was the main raison d'etre, it needed to be in one of the main countries, which allowed the format to be expanded. In 2004 the jamboree moved to England, and it became clear the format of group games led to too many meaningless games. By the time the 2006 tournament in India came into view, the event was under fire from some quarters, and at one time, there were hints that India might decline to take part in 2008.

== Schedule and location ==
The tournament was originally scheduled to be held in Pakistan between 11 and 28 September 2008 in Lahore and Karachi. The ICC postponed the tournament due to security fears expressed by several participating countries; On 24 July 2008, the International Cricket Council (ICC) announced that the tournament would take place in Pakistan after all despite players from Australia, England, South Africa and New Zealand raising concerns over touring the country. On 22 August 2008, South Africa announced that it would not take part in the Champions Trophy due to security concerns. Two days later, on 24 August 2008, after speculation that the tournament would be held elsewhere (England, Sri Lanka, or South Africa), the ICC announced that the tournament would be postponed until October 2009.

At its meeting in February 2009, the ICC board decided to move the tournament out of Pakistan on security concerns. At the time, Sri Lanka was the favoured alternate host. In March 2009, the ICC Chief Executives' Committee recommended to the ICC board that the tournament be held in South Africa as there were concerns that the weather in Sri Lanka during September and October could result in too many games being washed out. The ICC board ratified the recommendation, and the event took place in South Africa between 22 September and 5 October 2009.

== Qualification ==
As hosts, Pakistan was replaced by South Africa and qualified for the competition automatically; they were joined by the seven other highest-ranked teams in the ICC ODI Championship as of 1 August 2009.

Qualification	Date	Berths	Country
Host	2 April 2009	1	South Africa
ODI Championship	1 August 2009	7	India
ODI Championship	1 August 2009	7	Australia
ODI Championship	1 August 2009	7	England
ODI Championship	1 August 2009	7	New Zealand
ODI Championship	1 August 2009	7	Pakistan
ODI Championship	1 August 2009	7	Sri Lanka
ODI Championship	1 August 2009	7	West Indies

== Venues ==
Wanderers Stadium and Centurion Park, both in the Johannesburg area, were announced as venues for the tournament.

Centurion	Johannesburg
Supersport Park	Wanderers Stadium
Capacity: 22,000	Capacity: 34,000
Matches: 8 (including Final)	Matches: 7
Centurion Cricket Ground	

== Rules and regulations ==
The 2009 ICC Champions Trophy was contested by the top eight teams (previously 10) that had been seeded and divided into two groups. No associates nations participated in this tournament. Each team played every other team in its group once. Points were allocated for each match in accordance with the system described below which applied throughout the competition. Following the group stage, the top two teams from each group progressed to the semi-finals, where the winner of Group A played the runner up of Group B (in the 1st semi-final) and the winner of Group B played the runner up of Group A (in the 2nd semi-final). The winners of the semi-finals contested the final.

=== Points system ===
Results	Points
Win	2 points
Tie/No Result	1 point
Loss	0 points

== Match officials ==
Match referees

- (New Zealand) Jeff Crowe
- (India) Javagal Srinath
- (Sri Lanka) Roshan Mahanama

Umpires

- (New Zealand) Billy Bowden
- (Pakistan) Aleem Dar
- (Australia) Steve Davis
- (England) Ian Gould
- (Australia) Daryl Harper
- (New Zealand) Tony Hill
- (Pakistan) Asad Rauf
- (Australia) Simon Taufel

== Group stage ==
=== Group A ===
Pos	Team	Pld	W	L	T	NR	Pts	NRR
1	Australia	3	2	0	0	1	5	0.510
2	Pakistan	3	2	1	0	0	4	0.999
3	India	3	1	1	0	1	3	0.290
4	West Indies	3	0	3	0	0	0	−1.537

Source: ESPNcricinfo
- The top 2 teams qualified for the Knockout stage
- Advanced to Knockout stage

23 September 2009
14:30
Scorecard

West Indies; 133 (34.3 overs)	v	Pakistan; 134/5 (30.3 overs)
Nikita Miller 51 (57); Mohammad Amir 3/24 (7 overs)		Umar Akmal 41* (51); Gavin Tonge 4/25 (10 overs)

Pakistan won by 5 wickets
Wanderers Stadium, Johannesburg
Umpires: Steve Davis (Aus) and Daryl Harper (Aus)
Player of the match: Umar Akmal (Pak)

- West Indies won the toss and elected to bat.
- Chadwick Walton (WI) made his ODI debut.

26 September 2009
09:30
Scorecard

Australia; 275/8 (50 overs)	v	West Indies; 225 (46.5 overs)
Ricky Ponting 79 (95); Nikita Miller 2/24 (10 overs)		Travis Dowlin 55 (87); Nathan Hauritz 2/23 (7.5 overs)

Australia won by 50 runs
Wanderers Stadium, Johannesburg
Umpires: Asad Rauf (Pak) and Tony Hill (NZ)
Player of the match: Mitchell Johnson (Aus)

- West Indies won the toss and elected to field.

26 September 2009
14:30
Scorecard

Pakistan; 302/9 (50 overs)	v	India; 248 (44.5 overs)
Shoaib Malik 128 (126); Ashish Nehra 4/55 (10 overs)		Rahul Dravid 76 (103); Saeed Ajmal 2/31 (8.5 overs)

Pakistan won by 54 runs
SuperSport Park, Centurion
Umpires: Steve Davis (Aus) and Simon Taufel (Aus)
Player of the match: Shoaib Malik (Pak)

- Pakistan won the toss and elected to bat.

28 September 2009
14:30
Scorecard

Australia; 234/4 (42.3 overs)	v	India
Michael Hussey 67 (65); Ashish Nehra 1/38 (8 overs)

No result
SuperSport Park, Centurion
Umpires: Billy Bowden (NZ) and Ian Gould (Eng)

- Australia won the toss and elected to bat.
- Match abandoned due to rain.

30 September 2009
09:30
Scorecard

Pakistan; 205/6 (50 overs)	v	Australia; 206/8 (50 overs)
Mohammad Yousuf 45 (69); Shane Watson 2/32 (8 overs)		Michael Hussey 64 (87); Saeed Ajmal 2/31 (10 overs)

Australia won by 2 wickets
SuperSport Park, Centurion
Umpires: Billy Bowden (NZ) and Tony Hill (NZ)
Player of the match: Michael Hussey (Aus)

- Australia won the toss and elected to field.

30 September 2009
14:30
Scorecard

West Indies; 129 (36 overs)	v	India; 130/3 (32.1 overs)
Darren Sammy 23 (38); Praveen Kumar 3/22 (9 overs)		Virat Kohli 79* (104); Kemar Roach 1/27 (6 overs)

India won by 7 wickets
Wanderers Stadium, Johannesburg
Umpires: Aleem Dar (Pak) and Simon Taufel (Aus)
Player of the match: Virat Kohli (Ind)

- India won the toss and elected to field.
- Royston Crandon (WI) made his ODI debut.
- MS Dhoni (Ind) took his first ODI wicket.

=== Group B ===
Pos	Team	Pld	W	L	T	NR	Pts	NRR
1	New Zealand	3	2	1	0	0	4	0.782
2	England	3	2	1	0	0	4	−0.487
3	Sri Lanka	3	1	2	0	0	2	−0.085
4	South Africa	3	1	2	0	0	2	−0.177

Source: ESPNcricinfo
- The top 2 teams qualified for the Knockout stage
- Advanced to Knockout stage

22 September 2009
14:30
Scorecard

Sri Lanka; 319/8 (50 overs)	v	South Africa; 206/7 (37.4 overs)
Tillakaratne Dilshan 106 (92); Dale Steyn 3/47 (9 overs)		Graeme Smith 58 (44); Ajantha Mendis 3/30 (7 overs)

Sri Lanka won by 55 runs (D/L method)
SuperSport Park, Centurion
Umpires: Ian Gould (Eng) and Simon Taufel (Aus)
Player of the match: Tillakaratne Dilshan (SL)

- South Africa won the toss and elected to field.
- Rain limited South Africa's innings to 37.4 overs.

24 September 2009
09:30
Scorecard

New Zealand; 214 (47.5 overs)	v	South Africa; 217/5 (41.1 overs)
Ross Taylor 72 (106); Wayne Parnell 5/57 (8 overs)		AB de Villiers 70* (76); Daryl Tuffey 2/52 (9 overs)

South Africa won by 5 wickets
SuperSport Park, Centurion
Umpires: Aleem Dar (Pak) and Asad Rauf (Pak)
Player of the match: Wayne Parnell (SA)

- South Africa won the toss and elected to field.

25 September 2009
14:30
Scorecard

Sri Lanka; 212 (47.3 overs)	v	England; 213/4 (45 overs)
Thilina Kandamby 53 (82); James Anderson 3/20 (9.3 overs)		Eoin Morgan 62* (83); Nuwan Kulasekara 2/42 (9 overs)

England won by 6 wickets
Wanderers Stadium, Johannesburg
Umpires: Aleem Dar (Pak) and Billy Bowden (NZ)
Player of the match: Paul Collingwood (Eng)

- England won the toss and elected to field.

27 September 2009
09:30
Scorecard

New Zealand; 315/7 (50 overs)	v	Sri Lanka; 277 (46.4 overs)
Jesse Ryder 74 (58); Sanath Jayasuriya 3/39 (10 overs)		Mahela Jayawardene 77 (85); Kyle Mills 3/69 (10 overs)

New Zealand won by 38 runs
Wanderers Stadium, Johannesburg
Umpires: Ian Gould (Eng) and Daryl Harper (Aus)
Player of the match: Daniel Vettori (NZ)

- Sri Lanka won the toss and elected to field.

27 September 2009
14:30
Scorecard

England; 323/8 (50 overs)	v	South Africa; 301/9 (50 overs)
Owais Shah 98 (89); Wayne Parnell 3/60 (10 overs)		Graeme Smith 141 (134); James Anderson 3/42 (10 overs)

England won by 22 runs
SuperSport Park, Centurion
Umpires: Steve Davis (Aus) and Tony Hill (NZ)
Player of the match: Owais Shah (Eng)

- England won the toss and elected to bat.

29 September 2009
14:30
Scorecard

England; 146 (43.1 overs)	v	New Zealand; 147/6 (27.1 overs)
Paul Collingwood 40 (58); Grant Elliott 4/31 (8 overs)		Martin Guptill 53 (55); Stuart Broad 4/39 (8.1 overs)

New Zealand won by 4 wickets
Wanderers Stadium, Johannesburg
Umpires: Asad Rauf (Pak) and Daryl Harper (Aus)
Player of the match: Grant Elliott (NZ)

- New Zealand won the toss and elected to field.

== Knockout stage ==
Semifinals
B2	England	257 (47.4 overs)
A1	Australia	258/1 (41.5 overs)
A2	Pakistan	233/9 (50 overs)
B1	New Zealand	234/5 (47.5 overs)

Final
A1	Australia	206/4 (45.2 overs)
B1	New Zealand	200/9 (50 overs)

=== Semi-finals ===
2 October 2009
14:30
Scorecard

England; 257 (47.4 overs)	v	Australia; 258/1 (41.5 overs)
Tim Bresnan 80 (76); Peter Siddle 3/55 (10 overs)		Shane Watson 136* (132); Graham Onions 1/47 (8 overs)

Australia won by 9 wickets
SuperSport Park, Centurion
Umpires: Aleem Dar (Pak) and Billy Bowden (NZ)
Player of the match: Shane Watson (Aus)

- England won the toss and elected to bat.
- Steven Davies (Eng) made his ODI debut.

3 October 2009
14:30
Scorecard

Pakistan; 233/9 (50 overs)	v	New Zealand; 234/5 (47.5 overs)
Umar Akmal 55 (62); Ian Butler 4/44 (10 overs)		Grant Elliott 75* (103); Saeed Ajmal 2/39 (8 overs)

New Zealand won by 5 wickets
Wanderers Stadium, Johannesburg
Umpires: Ian Gould (Eng) and Simon Taufel (Aus)
Player of the match: Daniel Vettori (NZ)

- Pakistan won the toss and elected to bat.
- Aaron Redmond (NZ) made his ODI debut.

=== Final ===
5 October 2009
14:30
Scorecard

New Zealand; 200/9 (50 overs)	v	Australia; 206/4 (45.2 overs)
Martin Guptill 40 (64); Nathan Hauritz 3/37 (10 overs)		Shane Watson 105* (129); Kyle Mills 3/27 (10 overs)

Australia won by 6 wickets
SuperSport Park, Centurion
Umpires: Aleem Dar (Pak) and Ian Gould (Eng)
Player of the match: Shane Watson (Aus)

- New Zealand won the toss and elected to bat.

== Statistics ==
Most runs

Player	Matches	Runs	Avg	HS
(Australia) Ricky Ponting	5	288	72.00	111*
(Australia) Shane Watson	5	266	88.33	136*
(South Africa) Graeme Smith	3	206	68.66	141
(England) Paul Collingwood	4	202	50.50	82
(Pakistan) Mohammad Yousuf	4	200	50.00	87

Most wickets

Player	Matches	Wickets	Econ	BBI
(South Africa) Wayne Parnell	3	11	7.00	5/57
(England) Stuart Broad	3	10	5.50	4/39
(New Zealand) Kyle Mills	5	9	4.27	3/27
(Pakistan) Saeed Ajmal	4	8	3.79	2/16
(India) Ashish Nehra	3	8	4.76	4/55

== See also ==
- ICC Champions Trophy
