= Dale Richards =

West Indian cricketer

Personal information
- Full name: Dale Maurice Richards
- Born: 16 July 1976 (age 50); Belleplaine, Barbados
- Height: 6 ft 0 in (1.83 m)
- Batting: Right-handed

International information
- National side: West Indies
- Test debut: 9 July 2009 v Bangladesh
- Last Test: 29 June 2010 v South Africa
- ODI debut: 26 July 2009 v Bangladesh
- Last ODI: 3 June 2010 v South Africa

Domestic team information
- Years: Team
- 2000–2011/12: Barbados

Career statistics
Competition	Test	ODI	FC	LA
Matches	3	8	52	55
Runs scored	125	179	3,267	1,483
Batting average	20.83	25.57	36.30	28.51
100s/50s	0/1	0/2	4/23	1/10
Top score	69	59	159	121*
Catches/stumpings	4/–	5/–	63/–	20/–
- Source: Cricinfo, 28 November 2023

Dale Maurice Richards (born 16 July 1976) is a former West Indian international cricketer who played first class cricket for Barbados.

A right-handed batsman, Richards debuted in 1999/2000. His highest first class score of 159 was made against Jamaica in the Carib Beer Series of 2006/07.

Richards was called up for the West Indies' tour of England in 2009 but although he featured in two warm-up matches, he was forced to return home with a shoulder injury.

He subsequently made his Test debut against Bangladesh when a number of West Indian players made themselves unavailable. He played both Tests, scoring 108 runs with a top score of 69.

He then played the first two One Day Internationals against Bangladesh and two matches during the West Indies' 2009 ICC Champions Trophy campaign before being called up to the West Indies squad for the second ODI against South Africa in 2010.
