= David Bernard (cricketer) =

Jamaican cricketer (born 1981)

Personal information
- Full name: David Eddison Bernard
- Born: 19 July 1981 (age 45); Kingston, Jamaica
- Batting: Right-handed
- Bowling: Right-arm medium-fast
- Role: All-rounder

International information
- National side: West Indies
- Test debut: 19 April 2003 v Australia
- Last Test: 17 July 2009 v Bangladesh
- ODI debut: 25 May 2003 v Australia
- Last ODI: 3 June 2010 v South Africa
- ODI shirt no.: 8

Domestic team information
- Years: Team
- 2001–present: Jamaica

Career statistics
Competition	Test	ODI	FC	LA
Matches	3	20	80	57
Runs scored	202	141	3,524	725
Batting average	40.40	14.10	28.41	20.71
100s/50s	0/3	0/0	4/18	0/3
Top score	69	38	120	66
Balls bowled	258	624	8,155	1,737
Wickets	4	14	143	37
Bowling average	46.25	37.57	29.25	36.64
5 wickets in innings	0	0	3	0
10 wickets in match	0	0	0	0
Best bowling	2/30	3/32	6/40	3/17
Catches/stumpings	0/–	7/–	67/–	15/–
- Source: Cricketarchive, 6 June 2010

David Eddison Bernard (born 19 July 1981) is a West Indian cricketer who has played for the West Indies in Tests and ODIs. He played his second Test for a weakened West Indies team on 9 July 2009. In the second Test he scored 17 and 69.
