= Adrian Barath =

West Indian cricketer (born 1990)

Personal information
- Full name: Adrian Boris Barath
- Born: 14 March 1990 (age 36); Chaguanas, Trinidad and Tobago
- Batting: Right-handed
- Bowling: Right-arm off-break
- Role: Opening batsman

International information
- National side: West Indies
- Test debut (cap 281): 26 November 2009 v Australia
- Last Test: 11 June 2012 v England
- ODI debut (cap 15): 4 March 2010 v Zimbabwe
- Last ODI: 25 March 2012 v Australia
- ODI shirt no.: 18

Domestic team information
- Years: Team
- 2007–2014: Trinidad and Tobago
- 2010: Kings XI Punjab

Career statistics
Competition	Test	ODI	FC	LA
Matches	15	14	58	41
Runs scored	657	394	3,176	981
Batting average	23.46	30.30	32.40	25.15
100s/50s	1/4	1/1	7/17	1/4
Top score	104	113	192	113
Balls bowled	6	0	12	6
Wickets	0	–	0	0
Bowling average	–	–	–	–
5 wickets in innings	–	–	–	–
10 wickets in match	–	–	–	–
Best bowling	–	–	–	–
Catches/stumpings	13/–	3/–	40/–	10/–
- Source: ESPNcricinfo, 11 December 2022

Adrian Boris Barath (born 14 April 1990) is a former Trinidadian cricketer. A right-hand opening batsman for Trinidad and Tobago, Barath made his Test debut in November 2009, becoming the youngest West Indian to score a century. He played his first One Day International (ODI) in March the following year. He is also the second youngest West Indian to have scored a century in first-class cricket, after Bruce Pairaudeau. Barath played his final test match for West Indies in 2012.

== Career ==
A protégé of Brian Lara, Barath became the youngest West Indian player to make his first-class debut since Ramnaresh Sarwan when he first appeared for Trinidad and Tobago at 16. In his debut match, Barath scored 73 against Guyana and put on a 170 runs partnership with captain Daren Ganga. This gave them the record for Trinidad and Tobago highest opening partnership in first-class cricket. Barath scored his maiden century in his second match. He became the youngest player in the Caribbean to score a century in first-class cricket since Bruce Pairaudeau in 1947, and he followed that up with a second century in the next game.

Barath was part of the West Indies U-19 team for the 2008 World Cup played for the West Indies A team against the touring England side in January 2009, making 132. During the Airtel Champions League Twenty20 2009, Barath made his T20 debut for Trinidad and Tobago against Diamond Eagles where he made 63 runs off 41 deliveries.

He made his Test debut for the West Indies against Australia at the Gabba on 26 November 2009. He fell early in the first innings with a score of 15 but led the West Indies in the second innings scoring 104 runs when following on. He became the first West Indian to score a century on debut since Dwayne Smith. At the age of 19, he is also the youngest ever West Indian player to score a Test century, having taken over from George Headley.

Though initially included in the West Indies' 15-man squad for the 2011 World Cup, Barath suffered an injury to his right hamstring and was unable to play in the tournament. As a consequence he was replaced by Devon Smith. Initially, he was expected to take three weeks to recover, however two months later he was still unable to play. Barath returned to the West Indies side for the last of five ODIs against India in June. A three-Test series followed and Barath replaced Kraigg Brathwaite as opener. Though he had played in the Trinidad & Tobago Twenty20 Festival, Barath struggled during the Test series, looking out of practice and edging to the slips. He scored 150 runs from six innings.

The West Indies toured Bangladesh in October 2011 and during the opening ODI Barath incurred an injury to his hamstring and did not play again during the tour and was replaced by the in-form Lendl Simmons. Barath recovered in time to be selected for the squad to tour India the following month, taking over from Simmons who was omitted. He scored 17 runs from two ODIs, but was more successful in the Test series, managing 128 runs including two half-centuries from two matches including two half-centuries. Injury forced batsman Shivnarine Chanderpaul to miss the third and final Test, and it had been anticipated that without his influence the inexperienced West Indian batting line up might struggle. In the event, Barath opened the batting with Braithwaite and the pair put on a 137-run opening stand in the first innings, the West Indies' highest partnership for the first wicket since 2006.

Australia toured the West Indies for five ODIs and three Tests beginning in March 2012. A finger injury forced Barath to miss the first three ODIs, but having proved his fitness by scoring 114 for Trinidad and Tobago against Guyana in the Regional Four Day Competition was called up for the final two matches, replacing fellow opener Kieran Powell who had scored twenty runs from three matches. Playing in all three Tests, Barath managed 65 runs. Barath was not alone in struggling against Australia's bowlers, and captain Darren Sammy remarked "Stats don't lie. Our top order did not click against Australia, but the selectors have shown faith in two of them [Adrian Barath and Kieran Powell]. They are quite young, they are still learning on the job. Yes, they will fail sometimes. But there is one thing we won't do and that is give in."

Barath fell out of the West Indies test team after the series against England in the 2012 English summer. In 2014, Barath took a break from cricket to prioritise his Jehovah's Witness faith. Despite several attempts in the following years from cricket stakeholders to lure him to return, Barath never returned to cricket. Barath was aged 24 at the time of what turned out to be his final first class game, a very early end to a once promising international career.
