= Travis Dowlin =

West Indian cricketer (born 1977)

Personal information
- Full name: Travis Montague Dowlin
- Born: 24 February 1977 (age 49); Guyhock Gardens, Georgetown, Demerara, Guyana
- Batting: Right-handed
- Bowling: Right-arm off break
- Role: Batsman

International information
- National side: West Indies
- Test debut (cap 275): 9 July 2009 v Bangladesh
- Last Test: 22 June 2010 v South Africa
- ODI debut (cap 147): 26 July 2009 v Bangladesh
- Last ODI: 19 February 2010 v India
- ODI shirt no.: 15
- T20I debut (cap 33): 2 August 2009 v Bangladesh
- Last T20I: 23 February 2010 v Australia
- T20I shirt no.: 15

Domestic team information
- Years: Team
- 1996/97–2011/12: Guyana

Career statistics
Competition	Test	ODI	FC	LA
Matches	6	11	85	57
Runs scored	343	228	4,013	1,189
Batting average	31.18	25.33	30.17	24.26
100s/50s	0/3	1/1	4/25	2/5
Top score	95	100*	176*	119
Balls bowled	6	–	966	372
Wickets	0	–	15	3
Bowling average	–	–	26.80	94.00
5 wickets in innings	–	–	0	0
10 wickets in match	–	–	0	0
Best bowling	–	–	4/59	1/25
Catches/stumpings	5/–	2/–	77/–	17/–
- Source: ESPNcricinfo, 5 May 2021

Travis Montague Dowlin (born 24 February 1977) is a Guyanese former cricketer who represented Guyana, West Indies A and the West Indies in Tests, One Day Internationals and Twenty20 Internationals. He was a right-handed batsman and part-time off break bowler.

== International recognition ==
On 13 January 2007 he was named in the 30-man provisional squad for the 2007 Cricket World Cup but was not selected in the final squad of 15.

== International selection ==
Dowlin made his Test debut on 9 July 2009. He was part of an under-strength team fielded by the West Indies against Bangladesh; the 15-man squad included nine uncapped players and seven West Indies players made their Test debut in the match. The side was captained by Floyd Reifer who had played the last of his four Tests ten years earlier. The first XI had made themselves unavailable due to a pay dispute with the West Indies Cricket Board.

After scoring an unbeaten century against Bangladesh in just his second ODI at Roseau, Dowlin was also named in an understrength squad that travelled to South Africa to compete in the 2009 ICC Champions Trophy and played all three matches as the West Indies exited the competition at the group stage.

Dowlin subsequently kept his place in the West Indian squad for the tour to Australia, where he played in the first and third Tests in Brisbane and Perth.

His wicket was taken by MS Dhoni in the 2009 ICC Champions Trophy, Dhoni's only wicket in international cricket.
