= West Indies Players' Association =

The West Indies Players' Association (WIPA) is the representative body for professional cricketers from the Caribbean nations that constitute the Cricket West Indies (CWI).

As the exclusive representative and bargaining agent of players selected for national and West Indies teams, WIPA is the authorized and collective voice of all West Indian players, past and present. WIPA’s goals consist of; seeking better remuneration for players; seeking player welfare and interests to prepare them for a life after cricket; providing players with advice, assistance and services where appropriate; having players involved in community activities, training, and leadership in the areas of financial management, communication and industrial relations; and promoting a positive and harmonious relationship with CWI and other stakeholders.

WIPA is an affiliate of the Federation of International Cricketers' Associations and holds itself to be the "exclusive representative and bargaining agent for Players who have been selected for their Territorial Teams and the West Indies."

The association was established in 1973 and formally incorporated in Trinidad and Tobago in 2003. The initial president was Rohan Kanhai and the initial secretary Deryck Murray.

Since the establishment of WIPA, it has had an often acrimonious relationship with CWI .
