= Gavin Tonge =

West Indian cricketer (born 1983)

Personal information
- Full name: Gavin Courtney Tonge
- Born: 13 January 1983 (age 43); Antigua
- Height: 6 ft 3 in (1.91 m)
- Batting: Right-handed
- Bowling: Right-arm fast-medium
- Role: Bowler

International information
- National side: West Indies
- Only Test (cap 283): 16 December 2009 v Australia
- ODI debut: 28 July 2009 v Bangladesh
- Last ODI: 30 September 2009 v India
- ODI shirt no.: 48

Domestic team information
- Years: Team
- 2002/03–present: Leeward Islands
- 2006–2007/08: Antigua & Barbuda
- 2013–2014: Antigua Hawksbills

Career statistics
Competition	Test	ODI	FC	LA
Matches	1	5	87	62
Runs scored	25	10	1,792	337
Batting average	25.00	5.00	14.11	10.87
100s/50s	0/0	0/0	0/6	0/0
Top score	23*	5	73	28*
Balls bowled	168	300	12,139	2,809
Wickets	1	5	249	88
Bowling average	115.00	44.80	26.78	26.61
5 wickets in innings	0	0	9	0
10 wickets in match	0	0	0	0
Best bowling	1/28	4/25	7/58	4/25
Catches/stumpings	0/–	0/–	29/–	14/–
- Source: CricInfo, 20 August 2017

Gavin Courtney Tonge (born 13 January 1983) is a West Indian cricketer. He is a right-arm fast-medium bowler and has represented the West Indies cricket team in One Day International and Test cricket, as well as playing first-class cricket for Antigua and Leeward Islands.

== Career ==
Tonge began his first-class career in the 2002/03 season, having played in under-19 matches since 2000. He played his first game for Leeward Islands on 28 February 2003. He returned single-figure wicket tallies for his first five seasons, without a five-wicket-haul, however in the 2008–09 season he took 44 wickets at 25.09, including four five-wicket-hauls. His efforts led to a place in the West Indies ODI team.

Tonge was also selected to represent the West Indies at the 2009 ICC Champions Trophy and featured in their opening defeat at the hands of Pakistan on 23 September 2009, earning his best ever bowling figures in limited overs cricket of 4/25.

He made his Test debut against Australia in December 2009 in Perth when he replaced the injured Darren Sammy.
