= Sulieman Benn =

Barbadian cricketer

Personal information
- Full name: Sulieman Smith Benn
- Born: 22 July 1981 (age 45); Saint James, Barbados
- Nickname: Big Benn
- Height: 6 ft 7 in (2.01 m)
- Batting: Left-handed
- Bowling: Slow left arm orthodox
- Role: Bowler

International information
- National side: West Indies (2008–2016)
- Test debut (cap 268): 22 March 2008 v Sri Lanka
- Last Test: 17 April 2015 v England
- ODI debut (cap 138): 10 April 2008 v Sri Lanka
- Last ODI: 23 November 2016 v Sri Lanka
- ODI shirt no.: 62

Domestic team information
- Years: Team
- 1999–: Barbados

Career statistics
| Competition | Test | ODI | FC | LA |
|---|---|---|---|---|
| Matches | 26 | 47 | 99 | 116 |
| Runs scored | 486 | 182 | 2,059 | 566 |
| Batting average | 14.29 | 7.91 | 17.01 | 12.86 |
| 100s/50s | 0/0 | 0/0 | 0/7 | 0/0 |
| Top score | 42 | 31 | 79 | 39 |
| Balls bowled | 7,321 | 2,387 | 22,603 | 5,770 |
| Wickets | 87 | 39 | 379 | 139 |
| Bowling average | 39.10 | 49.05 | 26.73 | 28.66 |
| 5 wickets in innings | 6 | 0 | 44 | 1 |
| 10 wickets in match | 0 | 0 | 0 | 0 |
| Best bowling | 6/81 | 4/18 | 6/43 | 5/18 |
| Catches/stumpings | 14/– | 9/– | 79/– | 48/– |
Medal record
Men's Cricket
Representing West Indies
ICC Men's T20 World Cup
| Winner | 2016 India |
- Source: CricInfo, 5 May 2017

Sulieman Jamaal Benn (born 22 July 1981 in Saint James, Barbados) is a Barbadian former cricketer who played international cricket for the West Indies and first-class cricket for Barbados. Benn was a member of the West Indies team that won the 2016 T20 World Cup.

Benn debuted in 1999/00, as a left-arm orthodox spin bowler. He is also a fairly useful left-handed batsman with a first-class average of 17.48. Since his debut season, Benn has had to fight hard for a place in a Barbados team containing four West Indian international fast bowlers.

== International career ==
Following a series of strong performances in the 2007/08 Carib Beer Cup, Benn was called up to the West Indies Test squad. He beat off competition from Amit Jaggernauth for the spinner's spot and on 22 March 2008 made his debut for the West Indies in the first Test against Sri Lanka at Providence Stadium, Guyana. He bowled quite well in Sri Lanka's first innings, bowling 40 overs at an economy of 3.00, but went unrewarded. In his first Test innings he scored 28 and helped contribute to some useful lower-order resistance after the West Indies top order had been dismissed cheaply. In Sri Lanka's second innings, he claimed his first Test wicket, Mahela Jayawardene (caught by Shivnarine Chanderpaul), and finished with 3/59. He could only manage 7 with the bat in his second innings as the West Indies slid to a 121-run defeat.

On 6 December 2009, on the third day of the 2nd test against Australia, Benn managed his first five-wicket haul with career best figures of 5/155 after bowling 53 overs in the innings. In the third test between West Indies and Australia at the WACA, Benn came under scrutiny for a mid-pitch altercation with Brad Haddin and Mitchell Johnson after tangling with Johnson when attempting to field the ball and he was subsequently banned for two ODIs after being found guilty of breaching the spirit of the game.

On 28 February 2010, in a Twenty20 international against Zimbabwe, Benn became the first bowler to bowl two maiden overs in a Twenty20 international against a nation with test status, finishing with figures of four wickets for six runs.

At the 2010 ICC World Twenty20, Benn and Nikita Miller set the record for the highest 10th wicket partnership in T20 World Cups (20). That record was later equalled by the partnership between Steven Finn and Jade Dernbach at the 2012 tournament.

=== 2010 home series against South Africa ===
During the three-test series in June 2010 against South Africa, Benn took 15 wickets at an average of 30.6, and a strike rate of 29.3, and achieved his Test best bowling figures of 6/81 in South Africa's 1st innings in the Third Test. Despite Benn's efforts, his display was tarnished through a spitting incident with South African fast bowler Dale Steyn. Benn was reported to have provoked Steyn to spit on the feet of Benn after his dismissal when batting, and this resulted in a formal complaint to the ICC from Cricket South Africa, which was matched by a complaint from West Indies Cricket also, causing Steyn to lose his match fee.
