= Nikita Miller =

West Indian cricketer

Personal information
- Full name: Nikita O'Brien Miller
- Born: 16 May 1982 (age 44); St Elizabeth, Jamaica
- Height: 1.92 m (6 ft 4 in)
- Batting: Right-handed
- Bowling: Slow left-arm orthodox
- Role: Bowler

International information
- National side: West Indies (2009–2015)
- Only Test (cap 276): 9 July 2009 v Bangladesh
- ODI debut (cap 141): 4 July 2008 v Australia
- Last ODI: 15 March 2015 v Afghanistan
- ODI shirt no.: 33

Domestic team information
- Years: Team
- 2004–present: Jamaica
- 2013–2015: Jamaica Tallawahs
- 2016–2020: Trinbago Knight Riders

Career statistics
Competition	Test	ODI	FC	LA
Matches	1	50	100	139
Runs scored	5	284	2,296	678
Batting average	2.50	20.28	17.52	13.29
100s/50s	0/0	0/1	0/9	0/2
Top score	5	51	86	52*
Balls bowled	132	2,125	26,356	6,375
Wickets	0	45	538	153
Bowling average	–	36.88	16.31	27.30
5 wickets in innings	–	0	35	0
10 wickets in match	–	0	12	0
Best bowling	–	4/43	9/41	4/22
Catches/stumpings	0/–	18/–	60/–	47/–
- Source: ESPNcricinfo, 27 November 2023

Nikita O'Brien Miller (born 16 May 1982) is a West Indian cricketer who plays international cricket for the West Indies and domestic cricket for Jamaica. He is a slow left-arm orthodox bowler and lower-order batsman. He was the leading wicket taker in the 2007–08 Carib Beer Challenge and in June 2008 he won his first One Day International cap with the West Indies. The following year he made his Test debut for a weakened West Indies team during a contract dispute.

As of June 2013, Miller boasted the lowest First Class bowling average (15.51) of any active player in world cricket. Despite this, he has been overlooked for West Indies selection in favour of other spinners Devendra Bishoo (FC Ave: 29.77), Sulieman Benn (27.58) and Veerasammy Permaul (24.36).

== Career ==
=== 2004–05: First Class debut ===
Miller made his debut for Jamaica in the 2004–05 season. He took 39 wickets at 19.56. Highlights included a second innings 4–27 against Trinidad and Tobago. and six wickets in the Cup final against Leeward Islands, helping Jamaica win the match and the competition.

He plays for his club side Melbourne in the country's domestic league.

Miller toured Sri Lanka in 2089 and took 3 first class wickets at 47.

=== 2005–06 ===
In 2005-06 Miller only took 11 first class wickets at 25.

=== 2006–07 ===
In 2006-07 he took 6 wickets at 36.66.

=== 2007–08 ===
In the 2007–08 Carib Beer Challenge he was the leading wicket taker in the competition, taking 42 wickets in six games at 14.85.

In the final game of the regular season he took seven wickets against the Windward Islands, including 406 in one innings, as Jamaica won to win the league.

In doing so they reached the 2007–08 final, in which they faced Trinidad and Tobago. Having never previously taken a five wickets in innings, Miller took 5 for 29 in the first innings. He followed this with 5 for 92 in the second innings, with Jamaica going on to win by 9 wickets.

"It's been a long time coming, and I must say that I'm really, really elated," Miller said. "I'm really, really happy. I've been working really hard this season, and I'm very grateful.. It [being selected for the West Indies] would be on my mind, but the only thing I can do is to go on and perform to my best. If the coach or the selectors see it fit, then they will select me. I can't say that I deserve a game or not. So I'll just wait and see what they'll do."

==== International ODI debut ====
Subsequent to end of the West Indies domestic season, Australia toured the Caribbean. Having not been selected for either the Test series or the initial or the first three ODIs, Miller was "surprised" to be one of three new players called up for the final two ODIs in St Kitts, replacing Suliemann Benn. "I was looking out for it [earlier] because I had a good season so I always kept my mind in tune for that call so that I won't be surprised," said Miller. "I was disappointed [not to be called up sooner] but now that I got the chance I have to take it with both hands." The West Indies had already lost the series 3–0.

Mill made his West Indian debut on 4 July 2008, his first international wicket coming when he dismissed Michael Clarke lbw. He finished with figures of 1 for 19 as the West Indies lost by 1 run.

Two days later, in the final ODI of the series, he took 1 for 38, dismissing Luke Ronchi.

Miller kept his spot in the ODI squad for a three match series against Pakistan. Then he went on the ODI tour of New Zealand.

=== 2008 ===
He was selected for the 2008 Associates Tri-Series in Canada later that year, and took 3 for 19 against Bermuda, before taking 2 for 18 as the West Indies beat Canada in the final.

He took 2–75 in a first class game.

=== 2008–09 ===
Miller had another good season in 2008-09 taking 38 wickets at 16.34. In one game against Trinidad he took 8 wickets and scored 86.

=== 2009: Test debut ===
Miller made his Test debut on 9 July 2009. He was part of an understrength team fielded by the West Indies against Bangladesh; the 15-man squad included nine uncapped players. Including Miller, seven West Indies players made their debut and the side was captained by Floyd Reifer who had played the last of his four Tests ten years earlier. The first XI had made themselves unavailable due to a pay dispute with the West Indies Cricket Board.

=== 2009–10 ===
Miller toured Australia with the West Indies team in 2009–10. He took 3–51 in a game against the Prime Ministers Xi.

At home Miller took 22 first class wickets at 12.86 with a best return of 7-28.

In one day cricket he took 4–47 against Zimbabwe helping the West Indies to a rare series win, and 3–15 against Canada.

=== 2010–11 ===
In August 2010 Miller was given his first central contract by the WICB, though it was not renewed in October 2011.

He only took five first class wickets that summer. He took 2-8 for West Indies A against Pakistan A in a T20 and 2-4 for Jamaica against Somerset.

At the 2010 ICC World Twenty20, Benn and Nikita Miller set the record for the highest 10th wicket partnership in T20 World Cups (20). That record was later equalled by the partnership between Steven Finn and Jade Dernbach at the 2012 tournament.

=== 2011–12 ===
Miller had an excellent season in 2011-12 taking 49 first class wickets at 10.76, with a best of 5–16.

=== 2012–13 ===
In 2012-13 Miller took 52 first class wickets at 8.05, including six five-wicket hauls, a best of 7–13.

He played for West Indies A against Sri Lanka A, scoring 6-141 and making 50 not out in one game, and taking 6-51 and 2–23 in the one dayers. He also helped his club, Melbourne CC, win the national 50 overs title.

In 2013 he toured with the West Indies and took seven first class wickets.

=== 2013–14 ===
Miller took 13 wickets over the tour of India with the West Indies A side. He was their leading bowler.

At home he took 30 first class wickets at 25.2.

=== 2014–15 ===
Miller took 17 wickets in 2014–15 at 14.05. He toured Sri Lanka taking two first class wickets.

Miller was a part of the 2015 West Indies 15 man World Cup squad.

=== 2015–16 ===
Miller took 65 first class wickets in 2015–16 at 16.86 with a best of 8-67.

=== 2016–17 ===
In November 2016 during the 2016–17 Regional Four Day Competition, he took 5–22 against the Windward Islands, helping Jamaica to a narrow victory.

A month later he took career-best figures of 9/41 in the second innings of a match. These figures were also the best in West Indies' domestic cricket. He ended the tournament as the leading wicket-taker, with 58 dismissals in ten matches at 14.29, matching his feat from the 2015–16 edition.

It was again raised why Miller was not playing international cricket. "If called up to do a job [by West Indies], will do to best of ability – but my mind is not really on it," Miller said. "The one thing I'd say about criticism of whether I could replicate my domestic performances at Test level, and can only speak for myself – I have played in A team cricket in 2013 versus India and Sri Lanka, playing against guys like [Virender] Sehwag, [Gautam] Gambhir, [Cheteshwar] Pujara, Yuvraj [Singh] and got five-wicket hauls and was the leading West Indies A wicket-taker. Yes, the standard (of West Indies domestic cricket) could improve to another level, but if it was I believe I'd still do well, because if you're good, you perform despite the standard."

Miller also took 3–12 in nine overs in a 50 over game against Combined Campuses & Colleges.

== Lack of international representation ==
Nikita Miller's lack of international critic has mystified some. Miller had been overlooked in favour of Shane Shillingford, Devendra Bishoo, Sunil Narine, Veerasammy Permaul and Jomel Warrican.

One writer said " I keep hearing that he doesn't really spin the ball and doesn't get the bounce of, say, a Sulieman Benn...I have heard that he has disciplinary issues, but that can't be substantiated. As far as I know, he has never been put before a disciplinary panel and found guilty of any serious offence. The Nikita Miller I know is outspoken, and will stand up and say what he believes. There are times when he may rub authorities the wrong way with his willingness to speak up, but others have played far more often for the West Indies with far greater baggage on their resume."
