= SLC Super Provincial Twenty20 =

- Countries: Sri Lanka
- Administrator: Sri Lanka Cricket
- Format: Twenty20
- First edition: 2007–08
- Latest edition: 2016
- Tournament format: Round-robin and Knockout
- Number of teams: 13 (all tournaments); 5 (last)
- Current champion: Colombo Commandos
- Most successful: Wayamba Elevens (3 titles)
- Qualification: Champions League Twenty20
- Most runs: Jeevantha Kulatunga (627)
- Most wickets: Thissara Perera (31)

SLC Super Provincial Twenty20, earlier known as SLC Inter-Provincial Twenty20, was a Twenty20 domestic Cricket competition in Sri Lanka held by Sri Lanka Cricket. It was one of three Inter-Provincial Cricket tournaments. Sri Lanka used to have a Twenty20 Tournament which was conducted from 2004 to 2008 and was held between the clubs in Sri Lanka. From 2008 to 2011 the Inter-Provincial Twenty20 became the mainstream domestic Twenty20 competition in Sri Lanka. Wayamba elevens has been in all finals and won the first three tournaments, while Ruhuna won the final tournament. It was replaced by the Sri Lanka Premier League in 2012, but later revived in 2013, as Super Fours Provincial T20 Tournament and in 2016 as Super T20 Provincial Tournament.

== History ==
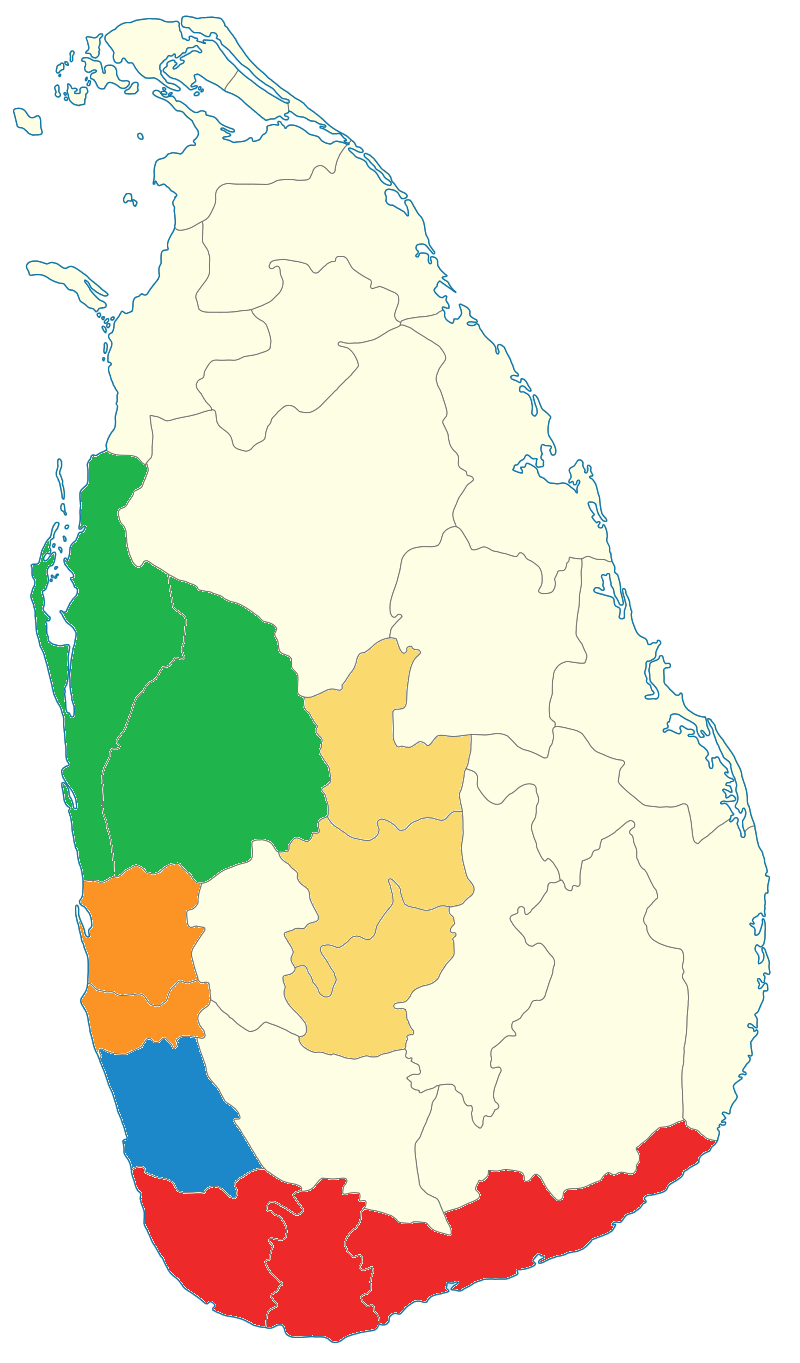
Super Provincial Twenty20 teams.

=== Inaugural season ===
Wayamba elevens won the first Inter-Provincial Twenty20 tournament, but they were not invited to the 2008 Champions League Twenty20 which included only teams from India, South Africa, Australia, England and Pakistan, but the tournament was ultimately cancelled due to The Attacks of 26/11 in Mumbai, India.

=== Second season ===
Wayamba elevens won their second Inter-Provincial Twenty20 tournament and qualified for the 2009 Champions League Twenty20.

=== Third season ===
Wayamba elevens won their third Inter-Provincial Twenty20 tournament and qualified for the 2010 Champions League Twenty20.

=== Fourth season ===
This season was the first one to have a different winner, other than Wayamba Elevens who had won all the previous 3 tournaments. Ruhuna Elevens won the tournament and qualified for CLT20 to be held in India. The fourth season of the Inter-Provincial Twenty20 was to be replaced by the Sri Lankan Premier League. There were franchise teams along with the inclusion of two extra provinces and the tournament was to allow international players to play, however the 2011 Sri Lanka Premier League was postponed due to allegations of corruption and incompetence by Sri Lanka Cricket. The Board of Control for Cricket in India had also decided not to allow Indian players to play in the tournament which later became the primary cause. Ruhuna elevens win their first Inter-Provincial Twenty20 tournament and qualifies for the qualifying stage of the 2011 Champions League Twenty20.

Also, this was supposed to be the last tournament before SLPL replaced it in 2012, but due to cancellation of SLPL, it will happen for a final time in 2013.

=== Fifth and sixth season ===
After the cancellation of 2013 Sri Lanka Premier League due to all eight franchises refusing to pay their tournament fee, and also failed to guarantee player payments, Sri Lanka Cricket announced that the Super Fours Provincial T20 Tournament would replace SLPL for that year. The primary concern was to have a team crowned champion and hand them a trip to the qualifiers of CLT20 in India to represent Sri Lanka. This tournament, however, would be 4-team tournament lasting for only 7 matches which is the lowest of all the seasons. It will begin on 10 August and will last up to 17 August. All seven matches in the league will take place at the R Premadasa Stadium in Colombo All the teams have been renamed. Angelo Mathews will captain the Basnahira Greens, Dinesh Chandimal the Uthura Yellows, Lahiru Thirimanne the Kandurata Maroons and Lasith Malinga will lead the Ruhuna Reds. Each team plays each other once, before the two top sides qualify for the final.

=== Seventh season ===
The seventh and final season of Inter-Provincial Twenty20, was named Super T20 Provincial Tournament by Sri Lanka Cricket. The tournament, comprises 5-teams with new names and logos. The teams, however, categorized according to the district and not with the province, Hambantota Troopers, Colombo Commandos, Galle Guardians, Kurunegala Warriors and Kandy Crusaders. All matches were played in R. Premadasa Stadium. Colombo Commandos won the tournament.

== Teams ==
Teams in the Inter-Provincial Twenty20 were based around representation of the Provinces of Sri Lanka. The first three tournaments hosted six teams including either a schools representative team or a Sri Lanka Cricket representative team. However the fourth season only hosted five teams all representing a province as well as a Combined Provinces team, for those provinces that were not represented by one team and in the last season there were even lesser teams (4).

Team	Province	Inception	Inaugural season	Final season	Captain	Home ground
Basnahira Elevens	Western Province	2011	2011	2011	Prasanna Jayawardene	Sinhalese Sports Club Ground
Combined Provinces Elevens	East, N.C.P, North, Sab, Uva	2011	2011	2011	Jeevan Mendis	
Kandurata Elevens	Central Province	1990	2007–08	2011	Chamara Kapugedera	Pallekele International Cricket Stadium
Ruhuna Elevens	Southern Province	1990	2007–08	2011	Mahela Udawatte	Galle International Stadium
Wayamba Elevens	North Western Province	1990	2007–08	2011	Thilina Kandamby	Welagedara Stadium
Basnahira North Elevens	Western Province North	1992	2007–08	2009–10	Thilina Kandamby	R. Premadasa Stadium
Basnahira South Elevens	Western Province South	1992	2007–08	2009–10	Chamara Silva	Sinhalese Sports Club Ground
Sri Lanka Schools XI	Sri Lanka Schools	2008	2007–08	2008–09	Dinesh Chandimal	
Sri Lanka Cricket Combined XI	Sri Lanka Cricket	2010	2009–10	2009–10	Hans Fernando	Dharmaraja College Ground
Basnahira Greens	Western Province	2013	2013	2013	Angelo Mathews	Sinhalese Sports Club Ground
Uthura Yellows	Northern Province	2013	2013	2013	Dinesh Chandimal	Rangiri Dambulla International Stadium, Dambulla
Kandurata Maroons	Central Province	2013	2013	2013	Lahiru Thirimanne	Pallekele International Cricket Stadium
Ruhuna Reds	Southern Province	2013	2013	2013	Lasith Malinga	Galle International Stadium

== Tournament history ==
Year	Final venue	Man of the tournament	Final		
Year	Final venue	Man of the tournament	Winners	Result	Runners-up
2007–08; Details	Welagedara Stadium	Chinthaka Jayasinghe	Wayamba; 174 for 9 (20 overs)	Won by 31 runs Scorecard	Ruhuna; 143 all out (19.1 overs)
2008–09; Details	Sinhalese Sports Club Ground	Isuru Udana	Wayamba; 149 for 5 (19 overs)	Won by 5 runs Scorecard	Basnahira South; 144 all out (19.1 overs)
2009–10; Details	Tyronne Fernando Stadium	Jeevantha Kulatunga	Wayamba; 208 for 8 (20 overs)	Won by 95 runs Scorecard	Ruhuna; 113 all out (13.2 overs)
2011; Details	R Premadasa Stadium	Tillakaratne Dilshan	Ruhuna; 198 for 7 (20 overs)	Won the one-over eliminator (Match tied); Scorecard	Wayamba; 198 for 8 (20 overs)
2013; Fixtures	R Premadasa Stadium	Nuwan Kulasekara	Kandurata Maroons; 113 for 3 (17 overs)	Won by 7 Wickets; Scorecard	Basnahira Greens; 109 for 7 (20 overs)
2014; Fixtures	Sinhalese Sports Club Ground	Seekkuge Prasanna	Southern Express; 161 for 8 (20 overs)	Won by 4 runs Scorecard	Udarata Rulers; 157 for 9 (20 overs)
2016; Details	R Premadasa Stadium	Dhananjaya de Silva	Colombo Commandos; 147 for 2 (16.4 overs)	Won by 8 wickets Scorecard	Galle Guardians; 143 for 7 (20 overs)

=== Competition placings ===
Season	Winner	Runner-up	Third	Fourth	Fifth	Sixth
2007–08	Wayamba	Ruhuna	Basnahira North	Kandurata	Basnahira South	Schools Invitation XI
2008–09	Wayamba	Basnahira South	Kandurata	Ruhuna	Basnahira North	Schools Invitation XI
2009–10	Wayamba	Ruhuna	Kandurata	Basnahira South	Basnahira North	Sri Lanka Cricket Combined XI
2011	Ruhuna	Wayamba	Basnahira	Kandurata	Combined Provinces	
2013	Kandurata Maroons	Basnahira Greens	Ruhuna Reds	Uthura Yellows		
2014	Southern Express	Udarata Rulers	Western Troopers	Yaal Blazers		
2016	Colombo Commandos	Galle Guardians	Hambantota Troopers	Kurunegala Warriors	Kandy Crusaders	

== See also ==
- Twenty20 Tournament
