= 2016 Super Twenty20 Provincial Tournament =

2016 Super T20 Provincial Tournament
- Administrator: Sri Lanka Cricket
- Cricket format: Twenty20
- Tournament format(s): Round-robin and Knockout
- Host: Sri Lanka
- Champions: Colombo Commandos (1st title)
- Participants: 5
- Matches: 13
- Player of the series: Dhananjaya de Silva (Commandos)
- Most runs: Dhananjaya de Silva (234)
- Most wickets: Shaminda Eranga (14)
- Official website: Cricinfo site

The 2016 Super T20 Provincial Tournament is the seventh edition of the Inter-Provincial Twenty20. The tournament featured a different format from previous seasons, featuring five teams, and was held between 26 January and 5 February 2016. Colombo Commandos won the tournament, defeat Galle Guardians in the final by 8 wickets.

== Format ==
The Tournament will comprise 10 Round-robin matches plus the two semi-finals and the final. All first Round-robin matches and semi finals were held as day games and the final as a day/night game.

== Teams ==
Team	Province	Captain
Colombo	Western Province	Milinda Siriwardene
Galle	Southern Province	Dinesh Chandimal
Hambantota	Southern Province	Tillakaratne Dilshan
Kandy	Central Province	Lahiru Thirimanne
Kurunegala	North Eastern Province	Mahela Udawatte

== Venue ==
All the matches will be played at R Premadasa Stadium, Colombo.

Colombo
R Premadasa Stadium
Capacity: 35,000
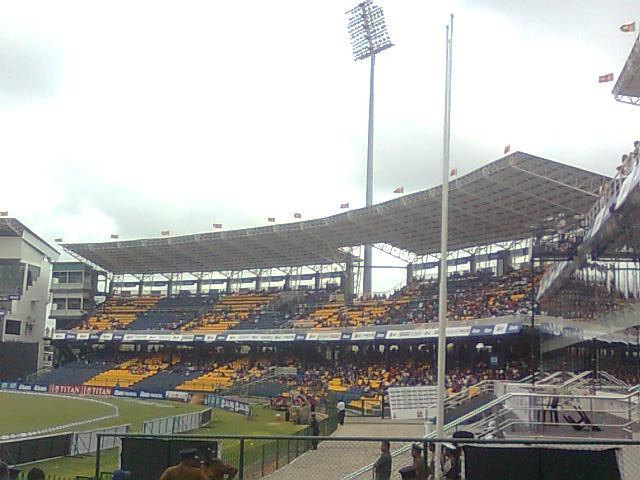
Venues in Sri Lanka

== Points table ==
Team	Pld	W	L	T	NR	Pts	NRR
Hambantota Troopers	4	3	1	0	0	6	0.00
Colombo Commandos (C)	4	2	2	0	0	4	0.00
Galle Guardians(R)	4	2	2	0	0	4	0.00
Kurunegala Warriors	4	2	2	0	0	4	0.00
Kandy Crusaders	4	1	3	0	0	2	0.00

(C) = Eventual Champion; (R) = Runner-up.

== Fixtures ==
=== Match 1 ===
26 January
Scorecard

Kandy; 114/9 (20 overs)	v	Hambantota; 114/7 (20 overs)
Lahiru Thirimanne 38 (30); Ashan Priyanjan 2/7 (2 overs)		Jehan Mubarak 30* (27); Suranga Lakmal 1/20 (3 overs)

Hambantota Troopers won by 7 wickets
R Premadasa Stadium, Colombo
Umpires: Rohitha Kottahachchi and Ranmore Martinesz

- Hambantota Troopers, who chose to field

=== Match 2 ===
26 January
Scorecard

Galle; 162/6 (20 overs)	v	Colombo; 163/7 (19.4 overs)
Kithuruwan Vithanage 53 (32); Kasun Rajitha 2/10 (4 overs)		Niroshan Dickwella 51 (35); Dushmantha Chameera 4/26 (4 overs)

Colombo Commandos won by 3 wickets
R Premadasa Stadium, Colombo
Umpires: Asanga Jayasooriya and Rohitha Kottahachchi

- Colombo Commandos, who chose to field

=== Match 3 ===
27 January
Scorecard

Colombo; 162/8 (20 overs)	v	Hambantota; 163/4 (18.1 overs)
Niroshan Dickwella 51 (25); Seekkuge Prasanna 2/23 (4 overs)		Ashan Priyanjan 41* (34); Shaminda Eranga 2/22 (3 overs)

Hambantota Troopers won by 6 wickets
R Premadasa Stadium, Colombo
Umpires: Asanga Jayasooriya and Rohitha Kottahachchi

- Hambantota Troopers, who chose to field

=== Match 4 ===
27 January
Scorecard

Kurunegala; 129/9 (20 overs)	v	Galle; 130/2 (16.3 overs)
Chamara Kapugedera 20 (16); Ajantha Mendis 2/23 (4 overs)		Lahiru Milantha 78 (43); Chamara Kapugedera 2/14 (2.3 overs)

Galle Guardians won by 8 wickets
R Premadasa Stadium, Colombo
Umpires: Lyndon Hannibal and Rohitha Kottahachchi

- Kurunegala Warriors, who chose to bat

=== Match 5 ===
29 January
Scorecard

Hambantota; 144/7 (20 overs)	v	Kurunegala; 146/6 (19 overs)
Ashan Priyanjan 64 (41); Janith Silva 2/30 (4 overs)		Asela Gunaratne 47 (43); Binura Fernando 2/28 (4 overs)

Kurunegala Warriors won by 4 wickets
R Premadasa Stadium, Colombo
Umpires: Gamini Dissanayake and Deepal Gunawardene

- Kurunegala Warriors, who chose to field

=== Match 6 ===
29 January
Scorecard

Kandy; 173/6 (20 overs)	v	Colombo; 182/5 (20 overs)
Lahiru Thirimanne 37 (27); Kasun Rajitha 3/28 (4 overs)		Dhananjaya de Silva 80* (59); Sachithra Senanayake 3/15 (4 overs)

Colombo Commandos won by 9 runs
R Premadasa Stadium, Colombo
Umpires: Nilan de Silva and Deepal Gunawardene

- Kandy Crusaders, who chose to field

=== Match 7 ===
30 January
Scorecard

Galle; 181/7 (19 overs)	v	Kandy; 178/6 (20 overs)
Lahiru Milantha 41 (24); Sachithra Senanayake 2/27 (4 overs)		Lahiru Thirimanne 61 (45); Suraj Randiv 2/27 (4 overs)

Galle Guardians won by 3 wickets
R Premadasa Stadium, Colombo
Umpires: Kapil Kottahachchi and Pradeep Udawatta

- Galle Guardians, who chose to field

=== Match 8 ===
30 January
Scorecard

Kurunegala; 141 (20 overs)	v	Colombo; 110 (16.3 overs)
Chamara Kapugedera 34 (25); Shaminda Eranga 4/18 (4 overs)		Dhananjaya de Silva 26 (16); Asela Gunaratne 5/10 (3 overs)

Kurunegala Warriors won by 31 runs
R Premadasa Stadium, Colombo
Umpires: Prageeth Rambukwella and Pradeep Udawatta

- Colombo Commandos, who chose to field

=== Match 9 ===
1 February
Scorecard

Kurunegala; 154/9 (20 overs)	v	Kandy; 156/5 (17.3 overs)
Shehan Fernando 56 (35); Saliya Saman 3/25 (4 overs)		Minod Bhanuka 54 (37); Chathuranga de Silva 2/11 (2 overs)

Kandy Crusaders won by 5 wickets
R Premadasa Stadium, Colombo
Umpires: Lyndon Hannibal and Prageeth Rambukwella

- Kurunegala Warriors, who chose to bat

=== Match 10 ===
1 February
Scorecard

Hambantota; 148/8 (20 overs)	v	Galle; 122 (19.1 overs)
Priyamal Perera 35 (26); Thilaksha Sumanasiri 2/16 (2 overs)		Dinesh Chandimal 31 (29); Lahiru Gamage 2/17 (3.1 overs)

Hambantota Troopers won by 26 runs
R Premadasa Stadium, Colombo
Umpires: Prageeth Rambukwella and SH Sarathkumara

- Hambantota Troopers, who chose to bat

== Semi-finals ==
=== Semifinal 1 ===
3 February
Scorecard

Hambantota Troopers; 164 (20 overs)	v	Colombo Commandos; 169/4 (16 overs)
Seekkuge Prasanna 44 (42); Kasun Rajitha 3/25 (4 overs)		Niroshan Dickwella 72 (38); Seekkuge Prasanna 1/13 (4 overs)

Colombo Commandos won by 6 wickets
R Premadasa Stadium, Colombo
Umpires: Deepal Gunawardene and Rohitha Kottahachchi

- Colombo Commandos, who chose to field

=== Semifinal 2 ===
3 February
Scorecard

Galle Guardians; 125/4 (17.2 overs)	v	Kurunegala Warriors; 121 (20 overs)
Udara Jayasundera 35 (37); Chamara Kapugedera 1/6 (1.2 overs)		Mahela Udawatte 33 (26); Suraj Randiv 3/12 (4 overs)

Galle Guardians won by 6 wickets
R Premadasa Stadium, Colombo
Umpires: Nilan de Silva and Ravindra Kottahachchi

- Galle Guardians, who chose to field

== Finals ==
=== Match 13 ===
5 February
Scorecard

Colombo Commandos; 147/2 (16.4 overs)	v	Galle Guardians; 143/7 (20 overs)
Shehan Jayasuriya 63* (47); Dilhara Lokuhettige 1/28 (3.4 overs)		Dinesh Chandimal 60 (53); Shaminda Eranga 4/27 (4 overs)

Colombo Commandos won by 8 wickets
R Premadasa Stadium, Colombo
Umpires: Lyndon Hannibal and Ranmore Martinesz
Player of the match: Shaminda Eranga (Commandos)

- Colombo Commandos, who chose to field

== Statistics ==
=== Highest Team Totals ===
The following table lists the five highest team scores during this season.

Team	Total	Opponent	Ground
Colombo Commandos	182/5	Kandy Crusaders	R. Premadasa Stadium, Colombo
Galle Guardians	181/7	Kandy Crusaders	R. Premadasa Stadium, Colombo
Kandy Crusaders	178/6	Galle Guardians	R. Premadasa Stadium, Colombo
Kandy Crusaders	173/6	Colombo Commandos	R. Premadasa Stadium, Colombo
Colombo Commandos	169/4	Hambantota Troopers	R. Premadasa Stadium, Colombo

Last Updated 5 February 2016.

=== Most Runs ===
The top five highest run scorers (total runs) in the season are included in this table.

Player	Team	Runs	Inns	Avg	S/R	HS	100s	50s	4s	6s
Dhananjaya de Silva	Colombo Commandos	234	6	46.80	133.71	80*	0	2	25	5
Niroshan Dickwella	Colombo Commandos	189	6	31.50	173.39	72	0	3	26	6
Lahiru Milantha	Galle Guardians	174	5	34.80	158.18	78	0	1	17	9
Seekkuge Prasanna	Hambantota Troopers	170	5	34.00	168.31	52	0	1	16	11
Dinesh Chandimal	Galle Guardians	166	6	33.20	106.41	60	0	1	10	2

Last Updated 5 February 2016.

=== Most Wickets ===
The following table contains the five leading wicket-takers of the season.

Player	Team	Wkts	Mts	Ave	S/R	Econ	BBI
Shaminda Eranga	Colombo Commandos	14	6	13.35	9.8	8.13	4/18
Kasun Rajitha	Colombo Commandos	10	6	15.30	14.4	6.37	3/25
Suraj Randiv	Galle Guardians	8	5	14.25	14.2	6.00	3/12
Dushmantha Chameera	Galle Guardians	7	5	19.28	15.4	7.50	4/26
Binura Fernando	Hambantota Troopers	6	4	18.83	14.0	8.07	2/23

Last Updated 5 February 2016.
