= Yaal Blazers =

Sri Lankan franchise cricket team

Personnel
- Captain: Dinesh Chandimal
- Owner: Sri Lanka Cricket

Team information
- City: Kurunegala
- Founded: 2013 (Uthura Yellows)
- Home ground: Welagedara Stadium
- Capacity: 10,000

History
- Super 4's T20 wins: 0
- CLT20 wins: 0

Yaal Blazers was a franchise cricket team based in Kurunegala, Sri Lanka.

== History ==
The team first took part in the 2013 Super 4's T20 was named as Uthura Yellows. After losing two games out of three, the team was eliminated. In 2014 the team was renamed as the Yaal Blazers.

== Squad ==
- Dinesh Chandimal (C)
- Akila Dananjaya
- Alankara Asanka
- Anuk Fernando
- Ashan Priyanjan
- Chamara Kapugedera
- Chaminda Bandara
- Chathuranga Kumara
- Dushmantha Chameera
- Jeevan Mendis
- Mahela Jayawardene
- Mahela Udawatte
- Ramith Rambukwella
- Rangana Herath
- Rumesh Buddika
- Sahan Wijeratne
- S Sanjeewan
- Shaminda Eranga
- Shehan Fernando
- Thisara Perera

== See also ==
- 2014 Super 4's T20
- Sri Lanka Cricket
