= 2011 SLC Super Provincial Twenty20 =

- Administrator: Sri Lanka Cricket
- Cricket format: Twenty20
- Tournament format(s): Round-robin and Knockout
- Host: Sri Lanka
- Champions: Ruhuna (1st title)
- Participants: 5
- Matches: 13
- Player of the series: Tillakaratne Dilshan
- Most runs: Dinesh Chandimal 203 (168 balls)
- Most wickets: Suraj Randiv 10 (20 overs, 138 runs)
- Official website: Cricinfo site

The 2011 SLC Super Provincial Twenty20 was the 4th season of the SLC Super Provincial Twenty20, the official Twenty20 domestic cricket competition in Sri Lanka. The tournament was scheduled as a replacement for the 2011 Sri Lanka Premier League, which was postponed to 2012. As such, the tournament had a different format from previous seasons, featuring five teams, instead of six, and was held sometime between 21 and 31 July 2011. The Sri Lanka Premier League replaced the SLC Super Provincial Twenty20.

The season comprised 10 regular matches, two semi finals and a grand final.

== Teams ==
Team	Province	Captain
Basnahira	Western Province	Prasanna Jayawardene
Combined Provinces	All other provinces	Jeevan Mendis
Kandurata	Central Province	Chamara Kapugedera
Ruhuna	Southern Province	Mahela Udawatte
Wayamba	North Western Province	Thilina Kandamby

== Venue ==
All of the matches in the tournament will be played in R Premadasa Stadium, Colombo.

Colombo
R Premadasa Stadium
Capacity: 35,000
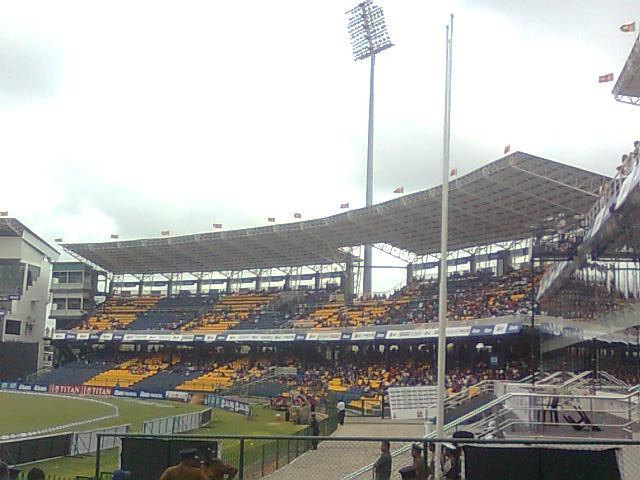
Venues in Sri Lanka

== Points table ==
Team	Pld	W	L	T	NR	Pts	NRR
Basnahira	4	3	1	0	0	6.94	+1.363
Ruhuna (C)	4	2	2	0	0	6.38	+0.888
Kandurata	4	2	2	0	0	5.20	–0.845
Wayamba (R)	4	2	2	0	0	3.78	–0.021
Combined Provinces	4	1	3	0	0	3.19	–1.372

(C) = Eventual Champion; (R) = Runner-up.
Winner qualified for the 2011 Champions League Twenty20.

== Results ==
=== Group stage ===
	Basnahira	Combined	Kandurata	Ruhuna	Wayamba
Basnahira		Won by 1 run	Won by 10 wickets	Won by 34 runs	Lost by bowl-out
Combined Provinces	Lost by 1 run		Lost by 10 wickets	Lost by 84 runs	Won by 7 wickets
Kandurata	Lost by 10 wickets	Won by 10 wickets		Lost by 40 runs	Won by 11 runs
Ruhuna	Lost by 34 runs	Won by 84 runs	Won by 40 runs		Lost by 7 wickets
Wayamba	Won by bowl-out	Lost by 7 wickets	Lost by 11 runs	Won by 7 wickets	

Note: Each match is listed twice and is read horizontally. (i.e. "row" team achieved "result" against "column" team)
Note: Click on the results to see match summary.

=== Tournament progression ===
	Group Matches					Knockout				
Team	1	2	3	4	5	SF	F			
Basnahira	0		1.61	4.28	6.94	MA				
Combined Provinces		0.36	0.91	1.59	3.19					
Kandurata	0.51	3.13	4.75	5.20		L				
Ruhuna	2.54	3.15		5.75	6.38	W	Tied			
Wayamba	1	2.63	3.33		3.78	MA	Tied			
Note: The total points at the end of each group match are listed.								Win	Loss	No result
Note: Click on the points (group matches)or W/L (Knockout) to see the summary for the match.								Team was eliminated before the league reached this stage.		
								Bye (Team has no match on this day.)		

== Fixtures ==
=== Round 1 ===
21 July
Scorecard

Basnahira cricket team	v	Wayamba cricket team

Match abandoned without a ball bowled
R Premadasa Stadium, Colombo
Umpires: Asoka de Silva and Sagara Gallage

- No toss
- Wayamba Wolves won 4-1 on a bowl-out.

21 July
Scorecard

Ruhuna cricket team 154/7 (20 overs)	v	Kandurata cricket team 114/7 (20 overs)
Dinesh Chandimal 63 (53); Muttiah Muralitharan 2/30 (4 overs)		Farveez Maharoof 55* (34); Janaka Gunaratne 2/1 (2 overs)

Ruhuna Rhinos won by 40 runs
R Premadasa Stadium, Colombo
Umpires: Kumar Dharmasena and Tyron Wijewardene

- Kandurata Kites won the toss and elected to field.
- Sanitha de Mel (Kandurata) made his Twenty20 debut.

Combined Provinces has a bye this round.

=== Round 2 ===
23 July
Scorecard

Combined Provinces; 61/8 (9 overs)	v	Kandurata; 63/0 (6.4 overs)
Chaturanga de Silva 27 (15); Jehan Mubarak 4/7 (2 overs)		Kumar Sangakkara 37* (19)

Kandurata won by 10 wickets
R Premadasa Stadium, Colombo
Umpires: Ranmore Martinesz and Maurice Zilva

- Kandurata won the toss and elected to field.

23 July
Scorecard

Ruhuna; 150/7 (20 overs)	v	Wayamba; 151/3 (17.2 overs)
Dinesh Chandimal 88* (57); Kaushal Lokuarachchi 2/13 (4 overs)		Rumesh Buddika 57 (36); TM Sampath 1/18 (3 overs)

Wayamba won by 7 wickets
R Premadasa Stadium, Colombo
Umpires: Kumar Dharmasena and Ravindra Kottahachchi

- Ruhuna won the toss and chose to bat

Basnahira has a bye this round.

=== Round 3 ===
24 July
Scorecard

Kandurata; 186/5 (20 overs)	v	Wayamba; 175 (20 overs)
Kumar Sangakkara 85 (46); Rushan Jaleel 2/18 (3 overs)		Indika de Saram 46 (24); Muttiah Muralitharan 2/29 (4 overs)

Kandurata won by 11 runs
R Premadasa Stadium, Colombo
Umpires: Chandrajith Danasinghe and Asoka de Silva

- Wayamba, who chose to field

24 July
Scorecard

Basnahira; 138 (19.2 overs)	v	Combined Provinces; 137/8 (20 overs)
Chinthaka Jayasinghe 41* (29); Jeevan Mendis 3/22 (3 overs)		Jeevan Mendis 40* (28); Dilruwan Perera 3/14 (4 overs)

Basnahira won by 1 run
R Premadasa Stadium, Colombo
Umpires: Gamini Dissanayake and Grashan Liyanage

- Basnahira, who chose to bat
- Ramith Rambukwella (Basnahira) and Rishan Kavinga (Combined Provinces) made their Twenty20 debuts.

Ruhuna has a bye this round.

=== Round 4 ===
26 July
Scorecard

Kandurata; 120 (19.4 overs)	v	Basnahira; 120/0 (14.1 overs)
Chanaka Wijesinghe 42 (49); Ishara Amerasinghe 4/18 (3.4 overs)		Dilshan Munaweera 57* (51); Jehan Mubarak 0/5 (1 overs)

Basnahira won by 10 wickets (with 35 balls remaining)
R Premadasa Stadium, Colombo
Umpires: Gamini Dissanayake and Raveendra Wimalasiri

- Basnahira, who chose to field
- Kasun Madushanka and Rajeeva Weerasinghe (Kandurata) made their Twenty20 debuts.

26 July
Scorecard

Ruhuna; 174/9 (20 overs)	v	Combined Provinces; 90 (13 overs)
Sanath Jayasuriya 44 (26); Jeevan Mendis 3/16 (4 overs)		Rishan Kavinga 19 (13); Suraj Randiv 3/8 (2 overs)

Ruhuna won by 84 runs
R Premadasa Stadium, Colombo
Umpires: Sena Nandiweera and Raveendra Wimalasiri

- Ruhuna, who chose to bat

Wayamba has a bye this round.

=== Round 5 ===
27 July
Scorecard

Basnahira; 166/3 (20 overs)	v	Ruhuna; 132 (18.3 overs)
Jeevantha Kulatunga 69* (47); Omesh Wijesiriwardene 1/6 (1 overs)		Mahela Udawatte 28 (16); Tillakaratne Dilshan 3/16 (4 overs)

Basnahira won by 34 runs
R Premadasa Stadium, Colombo
Umpires: Kumar Dharmasena and Deepal Gunawardene

- Ruhuna, who chose to field
- Shehan Kamileen and Yashodha Lanka (Ruhuna) made their Twenty20 debuts.

27 July
Scorecard

Wayamba; 155/5 (20 overs)	v	Combined Provinces; 156/3 (18.3 overs)
Chamara Silva 41 (31); Sachith Pathirana 2/25 (4 overs)		Ashan Priyanjan 52 (33); Kaushal Lokuarachchi 1/23 (2 overs)

Combined Provinces won by 7 wickets (with 9 balls remaining)
R Premadasa Stadium, Colombo
Umpires: Asanga Jayasooriya and Ranmore Martinesz

- Wayamba, who chose to bat
- Sohan Boralessa (Wayamba) made his Twenty20 debut.
- SI de Saram retired hurt after making 6 at 68/3 (8.2 ov)

Kandurata has a bye this round.

== Knockout stage ==
Semifinals
1	Basnahira	No result
4	Wayamba	Bye
2	Ruhuna	155/8 (20 ov)
3	Kandurata	148 (19.5 ov)

Finals
4	Wayamba	198/8 (20 ov)
2	Ruhuna (Super Over)	198/7 (20 ov)

=== Semi Final 1 ===
30 July
Scorecard

Basnahira	v	Wayamba

Match abandoned without a ball bowled
R Premadasa Stadium, Colombo
Umpires: Rohitha Kottahachchi and Ruchira Palliyaguruge

- No toss
- Wayamba advanced

=== Semi Final 2 ===
30 July
Scorecard

Ruhuna; 155/8 (20 overs)	v	Kandurata; 148 (19.5 overs)
Janaka Gunaratne 29* (23); Dinesh Chandimal 25 (26); Jehan Mubarak 2/18 (3 overs); Saliya Saman 2/24 (4 overs)		Tharanga Paranavitana 46 (33); Jehan Mubarak 28 (29); Chanaka Welegedara 3/26 (4 overs); Tillakaratne Sampath 2/26 (4 overs)

Ruhuna won by 7 runs
R Premadasa Stadium, Colombo
Umpires: Sagara Gallage and Tyron Wijewardene

- Kandurata, who chose to field
- Ruhuna advanced

=== Final ===
31 July
Scorecard

Ruhuna; 198/7 (20 overs)	v	Wayamba; 198/8 (20 overs)
Janaka Gunaratne 83 (42); Thisara Perera 3/33 (4 overs)		Thilina Kandamby 60 (34); Suraj Randiv 3/40 (4 overs)

Match tied; Ruhuna won the Super Over
R. Premadasa Stadium, Colombo
Umpires: Asoka de Silva and Ranmore Martinesz

- Ruhuna won the toss and elected to bat.

== Statistics ==
=== Awards ===
- Man of the Tournament – Tillakaratne Dilshan: 76 runs (45 balls), highest score of 56* (34 balls) (Basnahira)
- Batsman of the Tournament – Dinesh Chandimal: 203 runs (168 balls), highest score of 88* (57 balls) (Ruhuna)
- Bowler of the Tournament – Dilruwan Perera: 6 wickets (11 overs), best innings bowling of 3/14 (4 overs) (Basnahira)

=== Most Runs ===
The top five highest run scorers (total runs) in the season are included in this table.

Player	Team	Runs	Inns	Avg	S/R	HS	100s	50s	4s	6s
Dinesh Chandimal	Ruhuna cricket team	203	5	50.75	120.83	88*	0	2	19	4
Thilan Samaraweera	Wayamba cricket team	148	3	49.33	152.57	57	0	2	17	5
Mahela Udawatte	Ruhuna cricket team	143	6	23.83	138.83	65	0	1	17	3
Janaka Gunaratne	Ruhuna cricket team	137	6	34.25	134.31	83	0	1	8	7
Kumar Sangakkara	Kandurata cricket team	129	4	43.00	157.31	85	0	1	14	5

Last Updated 11 July 2012.

=== Most Wickets ===
The following table contains the five leading wicket-takers of the season.

Player	Team	Wkts	Mts	Ave	S/R	Econ	BBI
Suraj Randiv	Ruhuna cricket team	10	6	13.80	12.0	6.90	3/8
Jehan Mubarak	Kandurata cricket team	7	5	9.71	9.4	6.18	4/7
Farveez Maharoof	Kandurata cricket team	7	5	19.42	14.5	8.00	2/10
Tillakaratne Dilshan	Basnahira cricket team	6	2	6.50	8.0	4.87	3/16
Dilruwan Perera	Basnahira cricket team	6	3	10.00	11.0	5.45	3/14

Last Updated 11 July 2012.

=== Highest Team Totals ===
The following table lists the six highest team scores during this season.

Team	Total	Opponent	Ground
Ruhuna cricket team	198/7	Wayamba cricket team	R. Premadasa Stadium, Colombo
Wayamba cricket team	198/8	Ruhuna cricket team	R. Premadasa Stadium, Colombo
Kandurata cricket team	186/5	Wayamba cricket team	R. Premadasa Stadium, Colombo
Wayamba cricket team	175	Kandurata cricket team	R. Premadasa Stadium, Colombo
Ruhuna cricket team	174/9	Combined Provinces cricket team	R. Premadasa Stadium, Colombo
Basnahira cricket team	166/3	Ruhuna cricket team	R. Premadasa Stadium, Colombo

Last Updated 11 July 2012.

=== Highest Scores ===
This table contains the top five highest scores of the season made by a batsman in a single innings.

Player	Team	Score	Balls	4s	6s	Opponent	Ground
Dinesh Chandimal	Ruhuna cricket team	88*	57	9	2	Wayamba cricket team	R. Premadasa Stadium, Colombo
Kumar Sangakkara	Kandurata cricket team	85	46	8	4	Wayamba cricket team	R. Premadasa Stadium, Colombo
Janaka Gunaratne	Ruhuna cricket team	83	42	4	6	Wayamba cricket team	R. Premadasa Stadium, Colombo
Jeevantha Kulatunga	Basnahira cricket team	69*	47	6	4	Ruhuna cricket team	R. Premadasa Stadium, Colombo
Mahela Udawatte	Ruhuna cricket team	65	47	6	1	Wayamba cricket team	R. Premadasa Stadium, Colombo

Last Updated 11 July 2012.

=== Best Bowling Figures ===
This table lists the top five players with the best bowling figures in the season.

Player	Team	Overs	Figures	Opponent	Ground
Jehan Mubarak	Kandurata cricket team	2.0	4/7	Combined Provinces cricket team	R. Premadasa Stadium, Colombo
Ishara Amerasinghe	Basnahira cricket team	3.4	4/18	Kandurata cricket team	R. Premadasa Stadium, Colombo
Suraj Randiv	Ruhuna cricket team	2.0	3/8	Combined Provinces cricket team	R. Premadasa Stadium, Colombo
Chinthaka Perera	Ruhuna cricket team	2.0	3/12	Combined Provinces cricket team	R. Premadasa Stadium, Colombo
Dilruwan Perera	Basnahira cricket team	4.0	3/14	Combined Provinces cricket team	R. Premadasa Stadium, Colombo

Last Updated 11 July 2012.
