= Galle Guardians =

- One Day name: Galle Guardians

Personnel
- Captain: Dinesh Chandimal

History
- First-class debut: vs Colombo
- IP T20 wins: none
- Official website: Sri Lanka Cricket

Galle Guardians cricket team is one of the five provincial cricket teams which make up the Sri Lankan domestic cricket structure representing mainly Galle District of Southern Province, Sri Lanka, and with some nearby provinces. In previous occasions, the province was included in to Southern Express and Ruhuna Reds, where part of them was combined in this season as Galle Guardians. The cricket team's first participation came during the Twenty20 competition known as the Inter-Provincial Twenty20 2016 season which was known as Super T20 Provincial Tournament.

The team plays their matches in Colombo R. Premadasa Stadium. Dinesh Chandimal is the captain of the side. Ajantha Mendis, Suraj Randiv, Dushmantha Chameera and Kithuruwan Vithanage are some of the other notable current Test cricketers and Limited overs cricketers in the national side.

== Current squad ==
The squad for the 2015–16 season as of 26 January 2016.

Galle Guardians current squad
Players
Coaches

Nat.	Name	Age	Pos.	Bat st.	Bowl st.
(Sri Lanka)	Dinesh Chandimal (c)	26	Wicket-keeper batsman	RHB
(Sri Lanka)	Amila Aponso	22	Batsman	RHB	LO
(Sri Lanka)	Tilaksha Sumanasiri	21	Batsman	RHB	ROS
(Sri Lanka)	Dushmantha Chameera	24	Bowler	RHB	RF
(Sri Lanka)	Dilhara Lokuhettige	35	All-rounder	RHB	RMF
(Sri Lanka)	Hashan Dumindu	20	Bowler	RHB	ROS
(Sri Lanka)	Udara Jayasundera	25	All-rounder	LHB	LB
(Sri Lanka)	Prabath Jayasuriya	24	All-rounder	RHB	LO
(Sri Lanka)	Suraj Randiv	30	All-rounder	RHB	ROS
(Sri Lanka)	Shalika Karunanayake	28	All-rounder	RHB	RMF
(Sri Lanka)	Ajantha Mendis	30	Bowler	RHB	ROS
(Sri Lanka)	Lahiru Milantha	21	Wicket-keeper	LHB
(Sri Lanka)	Dilshan Munaweera	26	Opening batsman	RHB	ROS
(Sri Lanka)	Primosh Perera	26	Bastman	LHB	LB
(Sri Lanka)	Isuru Udana	27	Bowler	RHB	RMF
(Sri Lanka)	Jeffrey Vandersay	25	Bowler	RHB	LB
(Sri Lanka)	Kithuruwan Vithanage	24	All-rounder	LHB	LB
