= Thilan Thushara =

Sri Lankan cricketer (born 1981)

Personal information
- Full name: Magina Thilan Thushara Mirando
- Born: 1 March 1981 (age 45); Balapitiya, Sri Lanka
- Batting: Left-handed
- Bowling: Left-arm fast-medium
- Role: Bowler

International information
- National side: Sri Lanka (2003–2010)
- Test debut (cap 96): 27 June 2003 v West Indies
- Last Test: 19 November 2010 v West Indies
- ODI debut (cap 136): 15 April 2008 v West Indies
- Last ODI: 7 June 2010 v Zimbabwe
- T20I debut (cap 23): 10 October 2008 v Zimbabwe
- Last T20I: 11 May 2010 v India

Domestic team information
- Years: Team
- 2009–2011: Chennai Super Kings
- 2007–2008: Sinhalese Sports Club
- 2006–2007: Colts Cricket Club
- 2001–2006: Nondescripts Cricket Club
- 1998–2001: Singha Sports Club

Career statistics
Competition	Test	ODI	T20I
Matches	10	38	6
Runs scored	94	392	4
Batting average	8.54	18.66	2.00
100s/50s	0/0	0/1	0/0
Top score	15*	54*	3
Balls bowled	1,668	1,676	132
Wickets	28	50	7
Bowling average	37.14	27.86	25.57
5 wickets in innings	1	1	0
10 wickets in match	0	0	0
Best bowling	5/83	5/47	2/37
Catches/stumpings	3/–	4/–	2/–
- Source: ESPNcricinfo, 8 February 2011

Magina Thilan Thushara Mirando; (born 1 March 1981), or Thilan Thushara, is a Sri Lankan former cricketer, who played all formats of the game. He is a left-handed batsman and a left-arm medium-fast bowler. Though he did not represent the country at the international level after 2010, Thushara is an active member in Sri Lanka domestic competitions for Moors Sports Club.

== Domestic career ==
Thushara made his first-class debut in 1998–99. After a spell in Sri Lanka's premier fast-bowling academy, he impressed the selectors, and was included in the Test squad for the tour against South Africa. He made his Twenty20 debut on 17 August 2004, for Nondescripts Cricket Club in the 2004 SLC Twenty20 Tournament.

He had a grand playing style in 2006/2007 First Class series in Kandurata Maroons which was held in Sri Lanka between its provinces.

He also be played few games for the Chennai Super Kings in the Indian Premier League after being bought for $140000 at the IPL Auction on 6 February 2009.

He also played for 2016 Super Twenty20 Provincial Tournament for Hambantota Troopers.

== International career ==
He did not play in that series but then made his Test debut in 2003 in the touring party to West Indies. But he did not succeed much in that series as he did not score much and did not pick up any wicket and was dumped by the wayside.

He was finally chosen to play against West Indies on their 2008 tour. This time, he snapped up five wickets on his return to international cricket, and then managed three in the next match, to end the series with eight. He also took a wicket with his very first ball in his ODI career becoming the 18th bowler to achieve that mark and was also the third Sri Lankan bowler to achieve this feat.

On the same tour, he finally managed to make his ODI debut as well, in an inconsequential third ODI, and was pretty impressive in his near six over spell, with analysis of 5.2–1–12–1, before it rained and the match was abandoned.

His best ODI performance came against India in Sri Lanka during an ODI series. He took 10 wickets with the bowl including career best 5/47 at RPSC and scored 168 runs at 56 including his career best score of 54* at the same venue during the series.

He and Nuwan Kulasekara have been able to fill the void created by retirement of Chaminda Vaas and injured Lasith Malinga during 2008–2010 period.

For his performances in 2009, he was named as 12th man in the World ODI XI by the ICC.

Thushara was selected to play tri nation ODI series in Zimbabwe in 2010 and he got his 50th ODI wicket during his last ODI match. His 50th ODI wicket was Hamilton Masakadza.

== See also ==
- List of bowlers who have taken a wicket with their first ball in a format of international cricket
