= Colombo Commandos =

Sri Lankan cricket team

- One Day name: Colombo Commandos

Personnel
- Captain: Milinda Siriwardene

Team information
- Founded: Western Province; 1990-1991; Basnahira South; 1992-2010; Basnahira; 2011
- Home ground: R. Premadasa Stadium, Sinhalese Sports Club Ground & Tyronne Fernando Stadium
- Capacity: 35,000

History
- First-class debut: vs Galle
- IP T20 wins: 1
- Official website: Sri Lanka Cricket

Colombo Commandos cricket team is one of the five provincial cricket teams which make up the Sri Lankan domestic cricket structure representing mainly three districts of Western Province, Sri Lanka, the Colombo District, the Gampaha District and the Kalutara district, and with some nearby provinces. In previous occasions, the province was divided into two halves as Basnahira North and Basnahira South, which was combined in this season as Colombo Commandos. The cricket team's first participation came during the Twenty20 competition known as the Inter-Provincial Twenty20 2016 season which was known as Super T20 Provincial Tournament.

The team plays their home matches in Colombo R. Premadasa Stadium, Sinhalese Sports Club Ground and Tyronne Fernando Stadium in Moratuwa. Milinda Siriwardene is the captain of the side. Shehan Jayasuriya, Shaminda Eranga and Niroshan Dickwella are some of the other notable current Test cricketers and Limited overs cricketers in the national side.

Colombo Commandos won the 2016 Super T20 Provincial Tournament by defeating Galle Guardians in the final.

== Current squad ==
The squad for the 2015–16 season as of 26 January 2016.

Colombo Commandos current squad
Players
Coaches

Nat.	Name	Age	Pos.	Bat st.	Bowl st.
(Sri Lanka)	Milinda Siriwardene (c)	30	All-rounder	LHB	LO
(Sri Lanka)	Dhananjaya de Silva	24	Batsman	RHB	LOS
(Sri Lanka)	Niroshan Dickwella	22	Wicket-keeper Batsman	LHB
(Sri Lanka)	Shaminda Eranga	29	Bowler	RHB	RMF
(Sri Lanka)	Vishwa Fernando	24	All-rounder	RHB	LMF
(Sri Lanka)	Upul Indrasiri	33	Bowler	LHB	LO
(Sri Lanka)	Shehan Jayasuriya	24	All-rounder	LHB	ROS
(Sri Lanka)	Shehen Jayawardene	32	All-rounder	RHB	RFM
(Sri Lanka)	Lahiru Madushanka	23	All-rounder	RHB	RFM
(Sri Lanka)	Ramesh Mendis	20	All-rounder	RHB	ROS
(Sri Lanka)	Nadeera Nawela	31	Batsman	RHB	RFM
(Sri Lanka)	Rashmika Opatha	18	All-rounder	RHB	ROS
(Sri Lanka)	Kasun Rajitha	22	All-rounder	RHB	RMF
(Sri Lanka)	Ramith Rambukwella	24	Opening bastman	LHB	ROS
(Sri Lanka)	Lasanda Rukmal	25	All-rounder	RHB	RMF
(Sri Lanka)	Sadeera Samarawickrama	20	Wicket-keeper	RHB
(Sri Lanka)	Dasun Shanaka	24	All-rounder	RHB	RMF
