= Kurunegala Warriors =

- One Day name: Kurunegala Warriors

Personnel
- Captain: Mahela Udawatte

Team information
- Home ground: Welagedara Stadium

History
- Twenty20 debut: 2016
- IP T20 wins: none
- Official website: Sri Lanka Cricket

Kurunegala Warriors cricket team is one of the five provincial cricket teams which make up the Sri Lankan domestic cricket structure representing mainly two districts of North Western Province, Sri Lanka, and with some nearby provinces. In previous occasions, the province was included in to Wayamba cricket team, where part of them was combined in this season as Kurunegala Warriors. The cricket team's first participation came during the Twenty20 competition known as the Inter-Provincial Twenty20 2016 season which was known as Super T20 Provincial Tournament.

The team plays their matches in Colombo R. Premadasa Stadium, though the home ground is Welagedara Stadium. Mahela Udawatte is the captain of the side. Chamara Kapugedera, Upul Tharanga and Nuwan Pradeep are some of the other notable current Test cricketers and Limited overs cricketers in the national side.

== Current squad ==
The squad for the 2015–16 season as of 26 January 2016.

Kurunegala Warriors current squad
Players
Coaches

Nat.	Name	Age	Pos.	Bat st.	Bowl st.
(Sri Lanka)	Mahela Udawatte (c)	29	Batsman	LHB	ROB
(Sri Lanka)	Lasith Abeyratne	22	Wicket-keeper	LHB
(Sri Lanka)	Rumesh Buddika	25	Batsman	LHB	ROB
(Sri Lanka)	Chaturanga de Silva	26	Batsman	LHB	LO
(Sri Lanka)	Nuwan Pradeep	29	Bowler	RHB	RMF
(Sri Lanka)	Oshada Fernando	23	All-rounder	RHB	LB
(Sri Lanka)	Shehan Fernando	22	All-rounder	RHB	ROB
(Sri Lanka)	Asela Gunaratne	30	All-rounder	RHB	RMF
(Sri Lanka)	Imran Khan	23	Bowler	LHB	RMF
(Sri Lanka)	Ishan Jayaratne	26	All-rounder	RHB	RMF
(Sri Lanka)	Chamara Kapugedera	28	All-rounder	RHB	RMF
(Sri Lanka)	Tharindu Kaushal	22	Bowler	RHB	ROB
(Sri Lanka)	Maduka Liyanapathiranage	24	All-rounder	RHB	ROB
(Sri Lanka)	Kasun Madushanka	24	Bowler	RHB	RMF
(Sri Lanka)	Kusal Mendis	20	Batsman	RHB
(Sri Lanka)	Upul Tharanga	30	Batsman	LHB
