= Kandy Crusaders =

- One Day name: Kandy Crusaders

Personnel
- Captain: Lahiru Thirimanne

Team information
- Home ground: Pallekele International Cricket Stadium

History
- First-class debut: vs Hambantota
- IP T20 wins: none
- Official website: Sri Lanka Cricket

Kandy Crusaders cricket team is one of the five provincial cricket teams which make up the Sri Lankan domestic cricket structure representing mainly three districts of Central Province, Sri Lanka, and with some nearby provinces. In previous occasions, the province was included in to Kandurata Maroons, where part of them was combined in this season as Kandy Crusaders. The cricket team's first participation came during the Twenty20 competition known as the Inter-Provincial Twenty20 2016 season which was known as Super T20 Provincial Tournament.

The team plays their matches in Colombo R. Premadasa Stadium, though the home ground is Pallekele International Cricket Stadium. Lahiru Thirimanne is the captain of the side. Dilhara Fernando, Thisara Perera, Suranga Lakmal and Sachithra Senanayake are some of the other notable current Test cricketers and Limited overs cricketers in the national side.

== Current squad ==
The squad for the 2015–16 season as of 26 January 2016.

Kandy Crusaders current squad
Players
Coaches

Nat.	Name	Age	Pos.	Bat st.	Bowl st.
(Sri Lanka)	Lahiru Thirimanne (c)	26	Batsman	LHB	LMF
(Sri Lanka)	Lasith Ambuldeniya		Bowler	LHB	LO
(Sri Lanka)	Minod Bhanuka	20	Opening Batsman	LHB
(Sri Lanka)	Akila Dananjaya	22	Bowler	LHB	ROB
(Sri Lanka)	Dilhara Fernando	36	Bowler	RHB	RF
(Sri Lanka)	Anuk Fernando	20	All-rounder	LHB	RMF
(Sri Lanka)	Danushka Gunathilaka	24	All-rounder	LHB	RMF
(Sri Lanka)	Saliya Saman	30	All-rounder	RHB	RMF
(Sri Lanka)	Suranga Lakmal	28	Bowler	RHB	RMF
(Sri Lanka)	Jeevan Mendis	33	All-rounder	LHB	LB
(Sri Lanka)	Angelo Perera	25	All-rounder	RHB	LO
(Sri Lanka)	Thisara Perera	26	All-rounder	LHB	RMF
(Sri Lanka)	Chathura Randunu	31	All-rounder	LHB	LO
(Sri Lanka)	Manoj Sarathchandra	22	Wicket-keeper	RHB
(Sri Lanka)	Sachithra Senanayake	30	All-rounder	RHB	ROB
