= Hambantota Troopers =

- One Day name: Hambantota Troopers

Personnel
- Captain: Tillakaratne Dilshan

Team information
- Home ground: Mahinda Rajapaksa International Cricket Stadium
- Capacity: 33,000

History
- First-class debut: vs Kandy
- IP T20 wins: none
- Official website: Sri Lanka Cricket

Hambantota Troopers cricket team is one of the five provincial cricket teams which make up the Sri Lankan domestic cricket structure representing mainly Hambantota District of Southern Province, Sri Lanka, and with some nearby provinces. In previous occasions, the province was included in to Southern Express and Ruhuna Reds, where part of them was combined in this season as Hambantota Troopers. The cricket team's first participation came during the Twenty20 competition known as the Inter-Provincial Twenty20 2016 season which was known as Super T20 Provincial Tournament.

The team plays their matches in Colombo R. Premadasa Stadium, despite its home ground is MRIC Stadium. Tillakaratne Dilshan is the captain of the side. Besides, the captain Dilshan, Dimuth Karunaratne, Jehan Mubarak, Thilan Thushara and Dilruwan Perera are some of the other notable current Test cricketers and Limited overs cricketers in the national side.

== Current squad ==
The squad for the 2015–16 season as of 26 January 2016.

Hambantota Troopers current squad
Players
Coaches

Nat.	Name	Age	Pos.	Bat st.	Bowl st.
(Sri Lanka)	Tillakaratne Dilshan (c)	39	All-rounder	RHB	ROS
(Sri Lanka)	Binura Fernando	20	Bowler	RHB	LMF
(Sri Lanka)	Lahiru Gamage	27	Batsman	LHB	RMF
(Sri Lanka)	Angelo Jayasinghe	22	Bowler	RHB	LB
(Sri Lanka)	Dimuth Karunaratne	27	Batsman	LHB	RMF
(Sri Lanka)	Jehan Mubarak	35	Bowler	LHB	ROB
(Sri Lanka)	Sachith Pathirana	26	All-rounder	LHB	LO
(Sri Lanka)	Dilruwan Perera	33	All-rounder	RHB	OB
(Sri Lanka)	Seekkuge Prasanna	30	All-rounder	RHB	RLB
(Sri Lanka)	Ashan Priyanjan	26	All-rounder	RHB	OB
(Sri Lanka)	Malinda Pushpakumara	28	Batsman	RHB	LO
(Sri Lanka)	Denuwan Rajakaruna	25	Wicket-keeper	RHB
(Sri Lanka)	Lakshitha Rodrigo	18	Wicket-keeper	RHB
(Sri Lanka)	Lakshan Sandakan	24	Al-rounder	RHB	LUO
(Sri Lanka)	Alankara Asanka Silva	30	All-rounder	RHB	OB
(Sri Lanka)	Andy Solomons	28	Bowler	RHB	RMF
(Sri Lanka)	Thilan Thushara	34	All-rounder	LHB	LMF
(Sri Lanka)	Sandun Weerakkody	22	Wicket-keeper	LHB
