= List of Sri Lanka Twenty20 International cricketers =

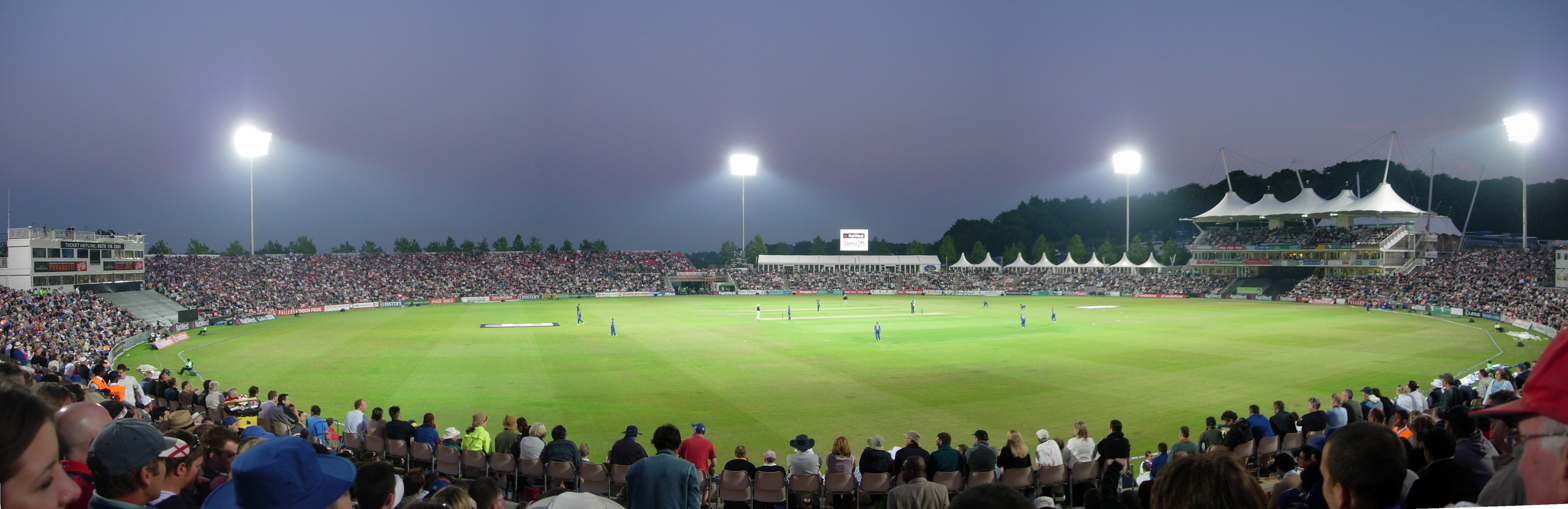
Sri Lanka playing England in its first Twenty20 International, at the Rose Bowl, Hampshire on 15 June 2006.

A Twenty20 International (T20I) is an international cricket match between two teams that have official T20I status, as determined by the International Cricket Council (ICC). It is played under the rules of Twenty20 cricket and is the shortest form of the game. The first such match was played on 17 February 2005 between Australia and New Zealand. The Sri Lanka national cricket team played its first T20I match on 15 June 2006, against England as part of Sri Lanka's 2006 England tour, winning the match by 2 runs.

Sri Lanka recorded the highest team total in T20I cricket on 14 September 2007, in a group stage match at the inaugural edition of the ICC World Twenty20, scoring 260 runs for 6 wickets against Kenya and winning the match by 172 run which is the highest winning margin in T20Is (till date).

This list comprises all members of the Sri Lanka cricket team who have played at least one T20I match. It is initially arranged in the order in which each player won his first Twenty20 cap. Where more than one player won his first Twenty20 cap in the same match, those players are listed alphabetically by surname.

== Key ==
General

- ‡ – Captain
- † – Wicket-keeper
- First – Year of debut
- Last – Year of latest game
- Mat – Number of matches played

Fielding

- Ca – Catches taken
- St – Stumpings taken

Batting

- Runs – Runs scored in career
- HS – Highest score
- Avg – Runs scored per dismissal
- * – Batsman remained not out
- 50 – Half-centuries scored
- 100 – Centuries scored

Bowling

- Balls – Balls bowled in career
- Wkt – Wickets taken in career
- BB – Best bowling in an innings
- Avg – Average runs per wicket

Captains

- Won – Number of games won
- Lost – Number of games lost
- Tied – Number of games tied
- NR – Number of games with no result
- Win% – Ratio of games won to those captained (Note: Games that did not have a result are not included in calculating the win ratio.)

== Players ==
Statistics correct as of 3 February 2026.

Sri Lanka T20I cricketers
General					Batting					Bowling				Fielding		Ref
Cap	Name	First	Last	Mat	Runs	HS	Avg	50	100	Balls	Wkt	BB	Avg	Ca	St	Ref
1	Russel Arnold	2006	2006	1	7	7	7.00	0	0	—	—	—	—	0	0	
2	Tillakaratne Dilshan ‡†	2006	2016	80	1,884	104*	27.98	13	1	246	9	2/4	43.57	31	2	
3	Dilhara Fernando	2006	2016	18	25	21	5.00	0	0	378	18	3/19	25.77	3	0	
4	Sanath Jayasuriya	2006	2011	31	629	88	23.29	4	0	371	19	3/21	24.00	4	0	
5	Mahela Jayawardene ‡	2006	2014	55	1,493	100	31.76	9	1	6	0	—	—	17	0	
6	Chamara Kapugedera	2006	2017	43	703	50	22.67	1	0	—	—	—	—	17	0	
7	Farveez Maharoof	2006	2016	8	33	13*	8.25	0	0	162	7	2/18	28.42	2	0	
8	Lasith Malinga	2006	2020	84	136	27	6.47	0	0	1,799	107	5/6	20.79	21	0	
9	Ruchira Perera	2006	2006	2	0	0*	—	0	0	42	0	—	—	0	0	
10	Kumar Sangakkara ‡†	2006	2014	56	1,382	78	31.40	8	0	—	—	—	—	25	20	
11	Upul Tharanga	2006	2018	26	407	47	16.28	0	0	—	—	—	—	2	0	
12	Marvan Atapattu	2006	2006	2	5	5	5.00	0	0	—	—	—	—	0	0	
13	Muttiah Muralitharan	2006	2010	12	1	1	0.50	0	0	282	13	3/29	22.84	1	0	
14	Chamara Silva	2006	2011	16	175	38	13.46	0	0	18	1	1/4	15.00	5	0	
15	Chaminda Vaas	2006	2007	6	33	21	33.00	0	0	132	6	2/14	21.33	0	0	
16	Malinga Bandara	2006	2009	4	12	7	6.00	0	0	84	4	3/32	24.00	1	0	
17	Jehan Mubarak	2007	2009	16	238	46*	21.63	0	0	8	1	1/9	17.00	9	0	
18	Gayan Wijekoon	2007	2007	3	1	1*	1.00	0	0	66	2	1/12	50.50	0	0	
19	Dilhara Lokuhettige	2008	2008	2	18	18*	—	0	0	30	2	2/6	15.00	0	0	
20	Thilina Kandamby ‡	2008	2011	5	13	10	3.25	0	0	—	—	—	—	4	0	
21	Jeevantha Kulatunga	2008	2008	2	19	11	9.50	0	0	—	—	—	—	2	0	
22	Ajantha Mendis	2008	2014	39	8	4*	2.66	0	0	885	66	6/8	14.42	6	0	
23	Thilan Thushara	2008	2010	6	4	3	2.00	0	0	132	7	2/37	25.57	2	0	
24	Mahela Udawatte	2008	2017	8	96	25	12.00	0	0	—	—	—	—	0	0	
25	Nuwan Kulasekara	2008	2017	58	215	31	10.23	0	0	1,231	66	4/31	23.18	17	0	
26	Kaushalya Weeraratne	2008	2009	5	49	20*	16.33	0	0	90	4	4/19	31.50	4	0	
27	Indika de Saram	2009	2009	1	—	—	—	—	—	—	—	—	—	1	0	
28	Angelo Mathews ‡	2009	2024	90	1,416	81*	27.76	6	0	1,169	45	3/16	30.86	27	0	
29	Isuru Udana	2009	2021	35	256	84*	18.28	1	0	631	27	3/13	33.88	4	0	
30	Gihan Rupasinghe	2009	2009	2	33	18	16.50	0	0	—	—	—	—	1	0	
31	Chinthaka Jayasinghe	2009	2010	5	49	38	49.00	0	0	—	—	—	—	0	0	
32	Muthumudalige Pushpakumara	2009	2009	1	—	—	—	—	—	18	1	1/27	27.00	1	0	
33	Dinesh Chandimal ‡†	2010	2025	69	1,066	66*	19.38	6	0	—	—	—	—	37	6	
34	Chanaka Welegedara	2010	2010	2	2	2*	—	0	0	36	1	1/21	61.00	0	0	
35	Suraj Randiv	2010	2011	7	8	6	4.00	0	0	126	7	3/20	19.85	0	0	
36	Thisara Perera (Note: Thisara Perera also played for World XI. Only his records for Sri Lanka are given above.)	2010	2021	80	1,047	58	21.36	2	0	1,024	45	3/24	35.08	29	0	
37	Suranga Lakmal	2011	2019	11	7	5*	2.33	0	0	208	8	2/26	41.25	3	0	
38	Jeevan Mendis	2011	2018	22	207	43*	18.81	0	0	210	12	3/24	20.75	7	0	
39	Rangana Herath	2011	2016	17	8	3	2.66	0	0	305	18	5/3	20.72	0	0	
40	Dilruwan Perera	2011	2011	3	1	1	0.50	0	0	60	3	3/26	24.00	0	0	
41	Dhammika Prasad	2011	2011	1	—	—	—	—	—	18	0	—	—	0	0	
42	Kaushal Lokuarachchi	2012	2012	2	11	11	5.50	0	0	36	2	2/31	24.00	1	0	
43	Sachithra Senanayake	2012	2016	24	56	17	9.33	0	0	486	25	4/46	21.96	3	0	
44	Lahiru Thirimanne	2012	2016	26	291	44	16.16	0	0	—	—	—	—	8	0	
45	Shaminda Eranga	2012	2013	3	6	6	6.00	0	0	66	3	2/30	30.00	1	0	
46	Dilshan Munaweera	2012	2017	13	215	53	17.91	1	0	60	1	1/26	92.00	1	0	
47	Akila Dananjaya	2012	2024	33	65	11*	8.12	0	0	701	30	3/36	32.16	7	0	
48	Kusal Perera ‡†	2012	2025	93	2,312	101	26.57	16	1	—	—	—	—	28	6	
49	Angelo Perera	2013	2019	6	59	16	11.80	0	0	6	0	—	—	1	0	
50	Ramith Rambukwella	2013	2016	2	19	19	19.00	0	0	39	1	1/19	46.00	0	0	
51	Seekkuge Prasanna	2013	2017	20	214	37*	15.28	0	0	300	10	2/45	35.90	4	0	
52	Kithuruwan Vithanage	2014	2016	3	40	38	13.33	0	0	—	—	—	—	1	0	
53	Dhananjaya de Silva	2015	2026	48	890	66*	20.69	3	0	310	17	2/22	20.76	22	0	
54	Binura Fernando	2015	2025	25	43	20	10.75	0	0	511	24	3/31	29.83	4	0	
55	Milinda Siriwardana	2015	2017	22	275	42	17.18	0	0	138	8	2/17	25.75	6	0	
56	Jeffrey Vandersay	2015	2025	17	35	8*	11.66	0	0	368	8	2/26	61.12	1	0	
57	Shehan Jayasuriya	2015	2020	18	241	40	15.06	0	0	137	3	1/11	71.00	4	0	
58	Dasun Shanaka ‡	2015	2026	124	1,747	74*	19.85	6	0	773	43	3/16	24.48	47	0	
59	Dushmantha Chameera	2015	2026	71	103	24*	4.90	0	0	1,554	83	4/17	24.69	14	0	
60	Danushka Gunathilaka	2016	2022	46	741	57	16.46	3	0	123	6	2/3	25.83	21	0	
61	Niroshan Dickwella †	2016	2021	28	480	68	18.46	1	0	—	—	—	—	12	1	
62	Kasun Rajitha	2016	2023	16	31	9*	10.33	0	0	396	17	3/29	36.17	1	0	
63	Asela Gunaratne	2016	2017	12	225	84*	25.00	2	0	149	5	1/11	40.80	5	0	
64	Chaminda Bandara	2016	2016	1	2	2*	4.00	0	0	6	0	—	—	0	0	
65	Nuwan Pradeep	2016	2021	16	10	8*	10.00	0	0	278	15	4/25	29.06	2	0	
66	Kusal Mendis †	2016	2026	100	2,425	86	25.52	17	0	—	—	—	—	41	17	
67	Sachith Pathirana	2016	2017	5	27	14	5.40	0	0	95	5	2/23	23.80	0	0	
68	Thikshila de Silva	2017	2017	3	3	3	1.50	0	0	6	0	—	—	0	0	
69	Lakshan Sandakan	2017	2021	20	23	10	7.66	0	0	460	23	4/23	24.21	6	0	
70	Vikum Sanjaya	2017	2017	8	20	6	6.60	0	0	173	9	2/20	27.77	1	0	
71	Ashan Priyanjan	2017	2017	3	54	40*	54.00	0	0	—	—	—	—	0	0	
72	Sadeera Samarawickrama †	2017	2024	19	310	61*	19.37	2	0	—	—	—	—	9	2	
73	Chaturanga de Silva	2017	2017	2	22	21	11.00	0	0	12	0	—	—	1	0	
74	Vishwa Fernando	2017	2017	1	2	2	2.00	0	0	12	0	—	—	0	0	
75	Shehan Madushanka	2018	2018	2	—	—	—	—	—	31	2	2/23	31.00	0	0	
76	Amila Aponso	2018	2018	3	0	0	0.00	0	0	60	4	2/29	19.75	0	0	
77	Kamindu Mendis	2018	2026	36	554	65*	19.10	3	0	150	3	1/14	69.66	17	0	
78	Lahiru Kumara	2019	2023	26	10	4	3.33	0	0	544	33	3/7	22.87	2	0	
79	Avishka Fernando	2019	2025	39	376	37	11.05	0	0	—	—	—	—	8	0	
80	Wanindu Hasaranga ‡	2019	2026	94	806	71	13.43	2	0	2,088	151	4/9	16.21	37	0	
81	Lahiru Madushanka	2019	2021	3	22	20	7.33	0	0	24	0	—	—	0	0	
82	Minod Bhanuka †	2019	2021	5	64	36	16.00	0	0	—	—	—	—	6	0	
83	Bhanuka Rajapaksa	2019	2025	45	744	77	22.54	3	0	—	—	—	—	10	0	
84	Oshada Fernando	2019	2021	7	128	78*	25.60	1	0	—	—	—	—	0	0	
85	Ashen Bandara	2021	2023	6	97	44*	24.25	0	0	6	0	—	—	2	0	
86	Pathum Nissanka	2021	2026	84	2,437	107	30.84	18	1	—	—	—	—	19	0	
87	Charith Asalanka ‡	2021	2026	74	1,426	80*	22.63	6	0	173	7	3/50	33.14	20	0	
88	Chamika Karunaratne	2021	2025	45	308	31	16.21	0	0	707	24	2/22	41.25	13	0	
89	Ramesh Mendis	2021	2024	4	17	12	5.66	0	0	42	2	1/13	24.00	1	0	
90	Maheesh Theekshana	2021	2026	76	96	14	4.00	0	0	1,707	71	3/17	28.28	17	0	
91	Praveen Jayawickrama	2021	2022	5	0	0*	—	0	0	79	2	1/29	59.00	0	0	
92	Nuwan Thushara	2022	2026	30	10	6	5.00	0	0	599	36	5/20	22.63	2	0	
93	Janith Liyanage	2022	2026	13	176	41*	25.14	0	0	—	—	—	—	4	0	
94	Kamil Mishara	2022	2026	18	423	76	26.43	3	0	6	0	—	—	1	0	
95	Dilshan Madushanka	2022	2024	15	2	1*	0.50	0	0	294	15	3/24	31.86	4	0	
96	Matheesha Pathirana	2022	2026	25	19	6	3.16	0	0	482	38	4/24	18.21	4	0	
97	Asitha Fernando	2022	2024	7	11	10*	—	0	0	120	4	1/11	52.00	2	0	
98	Pramod Madushan	2022	2023	8	2	1*	1.00	0	0	157	12	4/34	18.83	4	0	
99	Sahan Arachchige ‡	2023	2023	1	22	22	22.00	0	0	21	2	2/26	13.00	1	0	
100	Lasith Croospulle	2023	2023	1	16	16	16.00	0	0	—	—	—	—	0	0	
101	Shevon Daniel	2023	2023	1	9	9	9.00	0	0	—	—	—	—	0	0	
102	Nuwanidu Fernando	2023	2025	3	13	7	4.33	0	0	—	—	—	—	2	0	
103	Ravindu Fernando	2023	2023	1	9	9	9.00	0	0	6	0	—	—	2	0	
104	Lahiru Udara †	2023	2023	1	0	0	0.00	0	0	—	—	—	—	0	0	
105	Lahiru Samarakoon	2023	2023	1	1	1	1.00	0	0	18	1	1/10	10.00	0	0	
106	Nimesh Vimukthi	2023	2023	1	6	6	6.00	0	0	24	0	—	—	0	0	
107	Vijayakanth Viyaskanth	2023	2025	2	13	13*	—	0	0	48	1	1/28	56.00	0	0	
108	Chamindu Wickramasinghe	2024	2025	3	14	6*	—	0	0	42	1	1/17	55.00	2	0	
109	Dunith Wellalage	2024	2026	8	21	11*	10.50	0	0	183	9	3/9	26.00	3	0	
110	Dushan Hemantha	2025	2025	3	21	14*	21.00	0	0	68	4	3/38	22.25	0	0	
111	Eshan Malinga	2025	2026	8	1	1	1.00	0	0	137	8	2/24	26.87	3	0	
112	Pavan Rathnayake	2025	2026	5	61	40	20.33	0	0	12	2	2/11	5.50	1	0	

== T20I captains ==
Sri Lanka T20I captains
No.	Name	First	Last	Mat	Won	Lost	Tied	NR	Win%
1	Mahela Jayawardene	2006	2012	19	12	6	1	0	65.78%
2	Tillakaratne Dilshan	2008	2011	5	2	3	0	0	40.0%
3	Kumar Sangakkara	2009	2012	22	13	9	0	0	59.09%
4	Thilina Kandamby	2011	2011	1	1	0	0	0	100%
5	Angelo Mathews	2012	2021	16	6	9	0	1	40.00%
6	Dinesh Chandimal	2013	2018	26	13	13	0	0	50.00%
7	Lasith Malinga	2014	2020	24	7	15	1	1	32.60%
8	Upul Tharanga	2017	2017	6	3	3	0	0	50.00%
9	Thisara Perera	2017	2018	9	0	9	0	0	00.00%
10	Dasun Shanaka	2019	2023	48	22	24	2	0	47.91%
11	Kusal Perera	2021	2021	3	0	3	0	0	0.00%
12	Sahan Arachchige	2023	2023	1	0	1	0	0	0.00%
13	Wanindu Hasaranga	2024	2024	10	6	4	0	0	60.00%
14	Charith Asalanka	2024	2024	13	5	7	1	0	42.30%

== See also ==
- List of Sri Lanka Test cricketers
- List of Sri Lanka ODI cricketers
