= Ishan Jayaratne =

Sri Lankan cricketer

Personal information
- Full name: Hadigallage Ishan Anjana Jayaratne
- Born: 26 June 1989 (age 37); Colombo, Sri Lanka
- Nickname: Ishi/Isha
- Batting: Right-handed
- Bowling: Right-arm fast-medium

International information
- National side: Sri Lanka

Domestic team information
- Years: Team
- 2009–2016: Colts Cricket Club
- 2013: Basnahira
- 2013: Ruhuna
- 2014: Southern Express
- 2016: Kurunegala Warriors
- 2021: Kandy Warriors
Medal record
Men's Cricket
Representing Sri Lanka
South Asian Games
Silver medal – second place	2010 Dhaka	Team
- Source: Cricinfo, 31 December 2021

Hadigallage Ishan Anjana Jayaratne (born 26 June 1989) is a Sri Lankan cricketer who has played for several teams in Sri Lankan domestic cricket. He is a right-arm pace bowler.

== Career ==
A former Sri Lanka under-19s player, Jayaratne made his senior debut for the Colts Cricket Club in January 2009, in the Premier Limited Overs Tournament. In January 2010, he represented the Sri Lankan under-21s in the cricket tournament at the 2010 South Asian Games, winning a silver medal. Jayaratne made his first-class debut in February 2011, in the Premier Trophy. During the 2012–13 season, he took 23 wickets from seven matches, behind only Sajeewa Weerakoon for Colts, which included figures of 5/53 against Saracens and 7/37 against Lankan. Jayaratne was subsequently selected to make his debut for Sri Lanka A in the 2013 off-season, touring the West Indies and playing home series against New Zealand A and Kenya. At Twenty20 level, he has made appearances for Ruhuna, Southern Express (including in the 2014 Champions League Twenty20), and the Kurunegala Warriors.

In March 2018, he was named in Dambulla's squad for the 2017–18 Super Four Provincial Tournament. In March 2019, he was named in Dambulla's squad for the 2019 Super Provincial One Day Tournament. In October 2020, he was drafted by the Kandy Tuskers for the inaugural edition of the Lanka Premier League.

In June 2021, Jayaratne was named in Sri Lanka's squad for their tour of England. In July 2021, he was named in Sri Lanka's squad for their series against India. The following month, he was named in the SLC Greens team for the 2021 SLC Invitational T20 League tournament. In November 2021, he was selected to play for the Kandy Warriors following the players' draft for the 2021 Lanka Premier League. In July 2022, he was signed by the Colombo Stars for the third edition of the Lanka Premier League.
