= Sadeera Samarawickrama =

Sri Lankan cricketer (born 1995)

Personal information
- Full name: Wedagedara Sadeera Rashen Samarawickrama
- Born: 30 August 1995 (age 31); Colombo, Sri Lanka
- Batting: Right-handed
- Role: Wicket-keeper-batter

International information
- National side: Sri Lanka (2017–present)
- Test debut (cap 143): 6 October 2017 v Pakistan
- Last Test: 2 February 2024 v Afghanistan
- ODI debut (cap 185): 20 October 2017 v Pakistan
- Last ODI: 16 November 2025 v Pakistan
- ODI shirt no.: 23
- T20I debut (cap 72): 26 October 2017 v Pakistan
- Last T20I: 3 June 2024 v South Africa

Domestic team information
- Years: Team
- 2014–2020: Colts
- 2015: Colombo Commandos
- 2020–present: Tamil Union Cricket and Athletic Club
- 2021: Galle Gladiators
- 2022: Jaffna Kings
- 2023: Dambulla Aura
- 2024–present: Colombo Kaps
- 2026: Pokhara Avengers

Career statistics
Competition	Test	ODI	T20I	FC
Matches	9	50	19	95
Runs scored	308	1,261	310	5,571
Batting average	23.69	31.52	19.37	36.89
100s/50s	1/0	1/8	0/2	15/24
Top score	104*	108	61*	188
Catches/stumpings	15/2	9/0	9/2	150/23
- Source: ESPNcricinfo, 21 February 2025

Wedagedara Sadeera Rashen Samarawickrama (Sinhala: වෙදගෙදර සදීර රෂේන් සමරවික්‍රම; born 30 August 1995), popularly known as Sadeera Samarawickrama, is a professional Sri Lankan cricketer who represents the national team in all formats of the game. He was part of Sri Lanka's squad for the 2014 ICC Under-19 Cricket World Cup. He is a past pupil of Thurstan College and St. Joseph's College, Colombo, Sri Lanka.

== Domestic career ==
He made the most runs in the 2016–17 Premier League Tournament, with a total of 1,016 from 10 matches and 19 innings. In November 2017, he was named the best batsman in domestic cricket for the 2016–17 season at Sri Lanka Cricket's annual awards.

In March 2018, he was named in Galle's squad for the 2017–18 Super Four Provincial Tournament. The following month, he was also named in Galle's squad for the 2018 Super Provincial One Day Tournament.

In August 2018, he was named in Dambulla's squad the 2018 SLC T20 League. In February 2019, in the first day of the 2018–19 SLC Twenty20 Tournament, Samarawickrama scored an unbeaten century for Colts Cricket Club against Police Sports Club. In March 2019, he was named in Kandy's squad for the 2019 Super Provincial One Day Tournament. In August 2021, he was named in the SLC Blues team for the 2021 SLC Invitational T20 League tournament. In July 2022, he was signed by the Jaffna Kings for the third edition of the Lanka Premier League.

== International career ==
Samarawickrama was part of the Sri Lankan team in the ACC Emerging Teams Asia Cup 2017 tournament. He scored 45 runs in the final to win the low scoring match against Pakistan. This was the first time that Sri Lanka went onto win the tournament.

In September 2017, he was named in Sri Lanka's Test squad for their series against Pakistan in the United Arab Emirates. He made his Test debut for Sri Lanka against Pakistan on 6 October 2017 in Sri Lanka's first day-night Test match. In the first innings, he scored 38 runs and had a swift 68-run stand with centurion Dimuth Karunaratne. His inside-out drives to Yasir Shah was described similar to that of maestro Mahela Jayawardena's stroke play by critics.

In October 2017, he was named in Sri Lanka's One Day Internationals (ODI) squad for their series against Pakistan in the United Arab Emirates. He made his ODI debut for Sri Lanka against Pakistan on 20 October 2017. He was dismissed for nought in both matches, becoming the third batsman after Sachin Tendulkar and Kane Williamson to dismissed for nought in first two ODIs.

Later the same month, he was named in Sri Lanka's Twenty20 International (T20I) squad for their series also against Pakistan. He made his T20I debut for Sri Lanka against Pakistan on 26 October 2017, keeping wicket in the match.

In May 2018, he was one of 33 cricketers to be awarded a national contract by Sri Lanka Cricket ahead of the 2018–19 season. In June 2022, he was named in the Sri Lanka A squad for their matches against Australia A during Australia's tour of Sri Lanka.

In April 2023, Samarawickrama returned to the Sri Lanka's Test squad after six years for their series against Ireland. On 17 April 2023, during the first Test, he scored his maiden century in Test cricket, and became the first Sri Lankan wicket-keeper to score a century since 2016. His score of 104 runs was also the highest score by a Sri Lankan player while batting at Number 8 or lower in Tests. In the second T20I against Afghanistan, Samarawickrama scored his maiden T20I fifty with 51 off 42 and eventually Sri Lanka won the match by 72 runs and sealed the series 2–0 with one game to spare.

In May 2024, he was named in Sri Lanka's squad for the 2024 ICC Men's T20 World Cup tournament.
