= 2014 Sri Lanka Cricket Super 4's T20 =

2014 Super 4's T20
- Dates: 27 June – 2 July 2014
- Administrator: Sri Lanka Cricket
- Cricket format: Twenty20
- Tournament format(s): Round-robin and knockout
- Host: Sri Lanka
- Champions: Southern Express
- Participants: 4
- Matches: 8

The Super 4's T20 replaced the Sri Lanka Premier League from 2013. The tournament in 2014 was played between 27 June 2014 and 2 July 2014 between four franchise teams all owned by the board.

== Teams ==
- Western Troopers
- Udarata Rulers
- Yaal Blazers
- Southern Express

== Venues ==
Colombo
Sinhalese Sports Club Ground
Capacity: 10,000
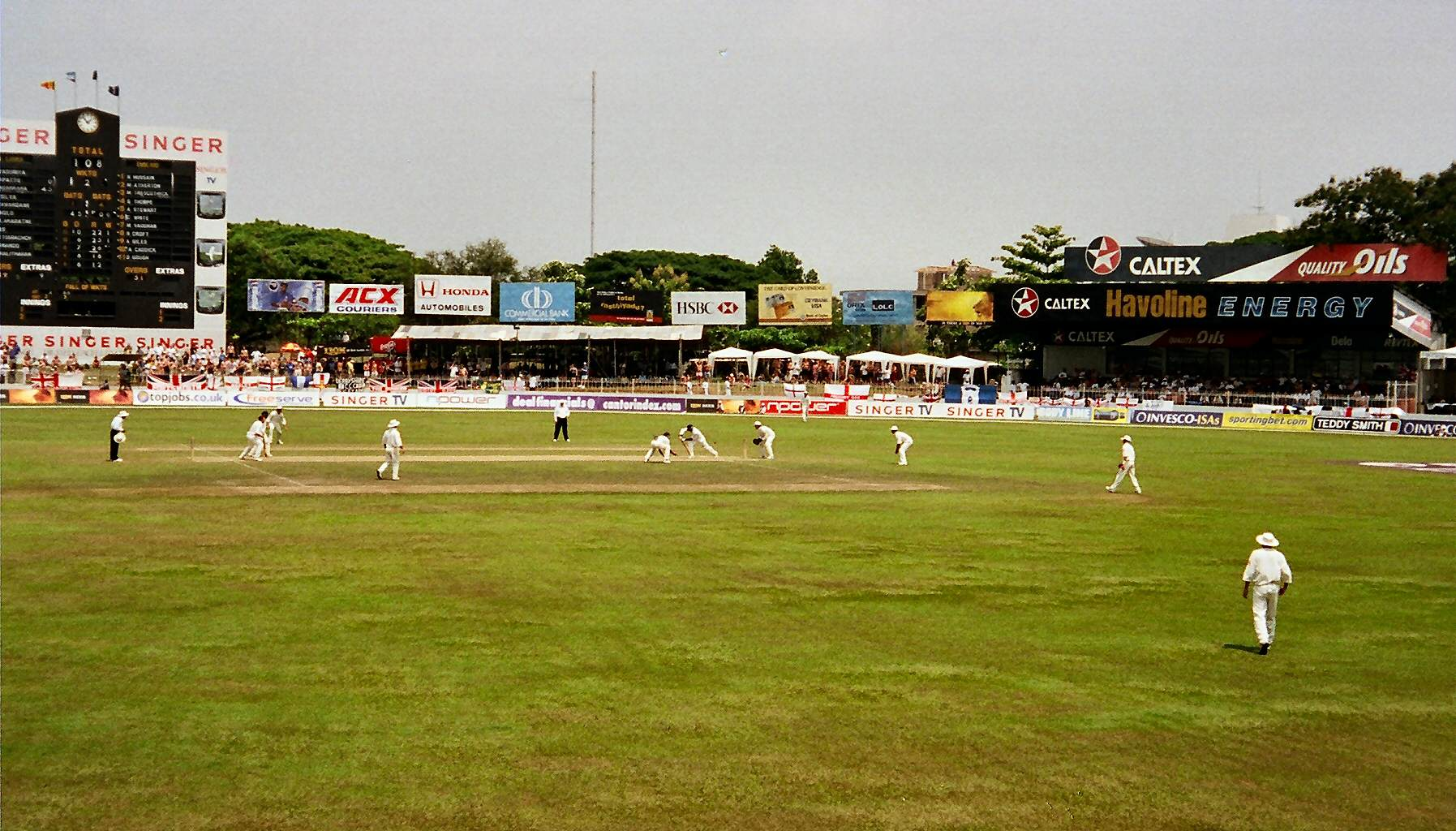

Colombo
