= Lahiru Milantha =

Sri Lankan cricketer (born 1994)

Personal information
- Full name: Bamunugama Koralalage Eshan Lahiru Milantha
- Born: 28 May 1994 (age 32); Kalutara, Sri Lanka
- Batting: Left-handed
- Role: Wicket-keeper Batter

Domestic team information
- Years: Team
- 2013/14 – 2017/18: Ragama CC
- 2015/16: Galle Guardians
- 2016: Prime Doleshwar SC
- 2018/19: Tamil Union
- 2019/20: Badureliya SC
- 2020/21: Negombo CC
- 2021–2022: Morrisville Raptors
- 2023: Silicon Valley Strikers
- 2023: Texas Super Kings
- 2024-present: Washington Freedom
- 2024–present: Janakpur Bolts

Career statistics
Competition	FC	LA	T20
Matches	66	44	46
Runs scored	4537	1394	1082
Batting average	44.92	34.00	25.76
100s/50s	12/21	1/12	0/4
Top score	252	112	78
Balls bowled	806	204	–
Wickets	15	4	–
Bowling average	28.93	46.50	–
5 wickets in innings	0	0	–
10 wickets in match	0	0	–
Best bowling	4/33	2/43	–
Catches/stumpings	65/16	16/7	18/5
- Source: Cricinfo, 27 July 2024

Lahiru Milantha (born 28 May 1994) is a Sri Lankan wicket-keeper batsman who plays for Washington Freedom (cricket) in Major League Cricket in the United States.

== Early life ==
He was born on 28 May 1994 in Kalutara, Sri Lanka. He schooled in St. Peter's College, Colombo. He started his career as an all-rounder who bowled leg-spin, but when he made it to college's First XI he played as a wicket-keeper batsman.

== Sri Lankan career ==
Milantha made his List A debut for Ragama CC on 12 December 2013, against Colts CC during the Premier Limited Overs Tournament, 2013. He made his first-class debut on 14 February 2014, against Chilaw Marians CC, in Premier League Tournament 2013/14. On 1 April 2015, he made his T20 Debut, against Colombo CC, during the SLC Twenty-20 Tournament 2014/15.

In March 2018 he was the leading run-scorer in the 2017–18 Premier Limited Overs Tournament, with 448 runs from six matches.

In March 2018 he was named in Galle's squad for the 2017–18 Super Four Provincial Tournament. The following month, he was also named in Galle's squad for the 2018 Super Provincial One Day Tournament.

In August 2018 he was named in Galle's squad the 2018 SLC T20 League. In February 2019, Sri Lanka Cricket named him as the Best Batsman in the 2017–18 Premier Limited Overs Tournament. In February 2020, he scored a double century in the 2019–20 Premier League Tournament, making 252 runs for Badureliya Sports Club.

== American career ==
Milintha was one of those several Sri Lankans who migrated USA during early 2020s.

He made his MiLC debut with Morisville Raptors on 28 August 2021, against Orlando Galaxy. In 2023 Milantha moved to Silicon Valley Strikers and he was their top scorer with 267 runs, in MiLC Pacific Division 2023.

In March 2023 Milantha was drafted in Round 3 for the Texas Super Kings as the wicket-keeper for the inaugural season of Major League Cricket.

In the 2024 MLC he was signed in the 10th round of domestic draft by Washington Freedom.
