= Kandurata Maroons =

Cricket team in Sri Lanka

- Kandurata Maroons

Personnel
- Captain: (Sri Lanka) Lahiru Thirimanne
- Coach: (Sri Lanka) Chaminda Vaas
- Owner: Sri Lanka Cricket

Team information
- City: Kandy
- Colors: Maroon; Light Blue
- Founded: 2013
- Home ground: Pallekele International Cricket Stadium

History
- Super 4's T20 wins: 1
- CL T20 wins: 0

Kandurata Maroons was a Sri Lankan franchise cricket team representing the Central Province. They won the 2013 Super Fours Provincial T20 to qualify for the Champions League T20. Led by Kumar Sangakkara, the team featured top national stars like Mahela Jayawardene. Though short-lived, they made an impact by reaching the CLT20 group stage in 2013.

== Squad ==
Players with international caps are listed in bold.

No.	Name	Nat	Birth date	Batting style	Bowling style
Batsmen
5	**Chamara Silva**	(Sri Lanka)	14 December 1979 (age 46)	Right-handed	Right-arm leg break
25	**Thilina Kandamby**	(Sri Lanka)	4 June 1982 (age 44)	Left-handed	Right-arm leg break
66	**Lahiru Thirimanne**(c)	(Sri Lanka)	8 September 1989 (age 37)	Left-handed	Right-arm medium-fast
All-rounders
75	Dhananjaya de Silva	(Sri Lanka)	6 September 1991 (age 35)	Right-handed	Right-arm off spin
34	Shehan Jayasuriya	(Sri Lanka)	12 September 1991 (age 35)	Left-handed	Right-arm off spin
37	**Dilhara Lokuhettige**	(Sri Lanka)	3 July 1980 (age 46)	Right-handed	Right-arm fast-medium
84	Milinda Siriwardana	(Sri Lanka)	4 December 1985 (age 40)	Left-handed	Slow left-arm orthodox
Wicket-keepers
11	**Kumar Sangakkara**	(Sri Lanka)	27 October 1977 (age 49)	Left-handed	—
44	**Upul Tharanga**	(Sri Lanka)	2 February 1985 (age 41)	Left-handed	—
Bowlers
2	**Kaushal Lokuarachchi**	(Sri Lanka)	20 May 1982 (age 44)	Right-handed	Right-arm leg break
29	Lahiru Jayaratne	(Sri Lanka)	12 October 1991 (age 35)	Right-handed	Right-arm medium-fast
30	**Dhammika Prasad**	(Sri Lanka)	30 May 1983 (age 43)	Right-handed	Right-arm fast-medium
40	**Ajantha Mendis**	(Sri Lanka)	11 March 1985 (age 41)	Right-handed	Right-arm off spin & leg break
88	**Suraj Randiv**	(Sri Lanka)	30 January 1985 (age 41)	Right-handed	Right-arm off spin
92	**Nuwan Kulasekara**	(Sri Lanka)	22 July 1982 (age 44)	Right-handed	Right-arm fast-medium

Source(s): Cricinfo, Kandurata Maroons

== See also ==
- 2013 Champions League Twenty20
