= Ashan Priyanjan =

Sri Lankan cricketer (born 1989)

Personal information
- Full name: Subasinghe Mudiyanselage Ashan Priyanjan
- Born: 14 August 1989 (age 37); Colombo, Western Province, Sri Lanka
- Height: 1.68 m (5 ft 6 in)
- Batting: Right-handed
- Bowling: Right-arm off break
- Role: Middle-order Batsman

International information
- National side: Sri Lanka (2013–2017)
- ODI debut (cap 157): 25 December 2013 v Pakistan
- Last ODI: 26 July 2015 v Pakistan
- T20I debut (cap 71): 6 September 2017 v India
- Last T20I: 27 October 2017 v Pakistan

Domestic team information
- Years: Team
- 2008/09–present: Tamil Union Cricket and Athletic Club
- 2007/08–2009/10: Ruhuna
- 2007/08: Bloomfield Cricket and Athletic Club
- 2017: Band-e-Amir Dragons
- 2020: Colombo Stars
- 2021: Kathmandu Kings XI
- 2022: Kandy Falcons
- 2023: Chattogram Challengers

Career statistics
Competition	ODI	T20I
Matches	23	3
Runs scored	420	54
Batting average	23.33	54.00
100s/50s	0/2	0/0
Top score	74	40*
Balls bowled	265	–
Wickets	5	–
Bowling average	46.60	–
5 wickets in innings	0	–
10 wickets in match	0	–
Best bowling	2/11	–
Catches/stumpings	7/–	0/–
- Source: ESPNcricinfo, 30 October 2017

Subasinghe Mudiyanselage Ashan Priyanjan (born 14 August 1989) is a professional Sri Lankan cricketer who plays for the national team in limited over formats. He is a middle-order batsman and occasionally a right-arm off break bowler.

== Personal life ==
He was educated at Nalanda College Colombo and played cricket for the college first XI team from 2005 to 2008 and was the vice captain in 2008. He is married to his longtime partner Ama Rajapakse, and their wedding ceremony was celebrated on 30 May 2017 at Pegasis Hotel, Wattala.

== Domestic career ==
After leaving school, Ashan played cricket for Bloomfield Cricket and Athletic Club, Combined Provinces, Ruhuna, Sri Lanka A cricket team, Sri Lanka Cricket Development XI, Sri Lanka Under-19s, Sri Lanka Under-20s School, Tamil Union Cricket and Athletic Club, Sri Lanka Board Presidents XI.

He was Sri Lanka's captain for the 2008 ICC Under-19 Cricket World Cup in Malaysia. He was also a member of the 2006 ICC Under-19 Cricket World Cup squad representing Sri Lanka. Priyanjan also led the Sri Lanka Youth T20 team at SAF Games in Bangladesh in January 2010. He represented Sri Lanka team in Hong Kong Cricket Sixes 2011, a three-day tournament at Kowloon Cricket Club of Kowloon.

On 25 July 2014, Priyanjan scored a hundred against Ireland in Sri Lanka A tour Ireland. He hit 111 off 70 balls as Sri Lanka piled up 329 for 8 in fifty overs. Ireland only scored 222 and Sri Lanka won the match convincingly by 107 runs.

He also played for the domestic team Hambantota Troopers in 2016 Super Twenty20 Provincial Tournament.

In March 2018, he was named in Dambulla's squad for the 2017–18 Super Four Provincial Tournament. He was the leading run-scorer for Dambulla during the tournament, with 282 runs in three matches. The following month, he was also named in Dambulla's squad for the 2018 Super Provincial One Day Tournament and was the leading run-scorer for the team in the tournament.

In August 2018, he was named in Dambulla's squad the 2018 SLC T20 League. In Dambulla's opening match of the tournament, against Kandy, Priyanjan scored 108 runs from 52 balls, with Dambulla going on to win by 18 runs. In March 2019, he was named in Colombo's squad for the 2019 Super Provincial One Day Tournament. In October 2020, he was drafted by the Colombo Kings for the inaugural edition of the Lanka Premier League. In August 2021, he was named as the captain of the SLC Greens team for the 2021 SLC Invitational T20 League tournament. In July 2022, he was signed by the Kandy Falcons for the third edition of the Lanka Premier League.

== International career ==
Priyanjan made his ODI debut on 25 December 2013 as the 157th ODI cap for Sri Lanka, and scored 74 runs on his debut against Pakistan at Abu Dhabi. The score stands as the highest ODI score by a Sri Lanka debutant. However, Pakistan won the match by 8 wickets at the end. Priyanjan played 23 ODIs after his debut, but only managed to score 2 fifties and dropped from the squad in 2015.

In 2017, Priyanjan was called in to the one-off T20I against India. He made his Twenty20 International (T20I) debut for Sri Lanka against India on 6 September 2017. He scored unbeaten 40 runs in the match and posted a total of 170 to India. India finally chased the total and won the match by 7 wickets.
