= Southern Express (cricket team) =

Personnel
- Captain: (Sri Lanka) Jehan Mubarak
- Coach: (Sri Lanka) Upul Chandana
- Owner: Sri Lanka Cricket

Team information
- City: Galle
- Founded: 2013 (Ruhuna Red)
- Home ground: Galle International Stadium
- Capacity: 35,000

History
- Super 4's T20 wins: 1
- CL T20 wins: 0

Southern Express (previously known as Ruhuna Red) was a franchise cricket team based in Galle, Sri Lanka.

== History ==
The team first took part in the 2013 Super 4's T20 as Ruhuna Red, after losing two games out of three, the team was eliminated. In 2014 the team was renamed as the Southern Express.

== Players ==
Players with international caps are listed in bold.

No.	Name	Nat	Birth date	Batting style	Bowling style	Notes
Batsmen
–	Yasodha Lanka	(Sri Lanka)	1 October 1992 (age 33)	Right	Left-arm fast-medium	
–	Andy Solomons	(Sri Lanka)	18 September 1987 (age 38)	Right	Right-arm fast-medium	
All-rounders
–	**Dilruwan Perera**	(Sri Lanka)	22 July 1982 (age 44)	Right	Right-arm off break	
–	**Jehan Mubarak**	(Sri Lanka)	10 January 1981 (age 45)	Left	Right-arm off break	
–	**Farveez Maharoof**	(Sri Lanka)	7 September 1984 (age 41)	Right	Right-arm fast-medium	
–	**Seekkuge Prasanna**	(Sri Lanka)	27 June 1985 (age 41)	Right	Right-arm leg break	
–	**Tillakaratne Dilshan**	(Sri Lanka)	23 November 1976 (age 49)	Right	Right-arm off break	
–	**Angelo Perera**	(Sri Lanka)	23 February 1990 (age 36)	Right	Left-arm orthodox	
–	Tillakaratne Sampath	(Sri Lanka)	23 June 1982 (age 44)	Right	Right-arm off break	
Wicket-keepers
–	**Niroshan Dickwella**	(Sri Lanka)	23 June 1993 (age 33)	Left	–	Opening Batsman
–	**Kusal Perera**	(Sri Lanka)	17 August 1990 (age 35)	Left	–	Opening Batsman
–	Sandun Weerakkody	(Sri Lanka)	3 September 1993 (age 32)	Left	–	
–	Lakshan Rangika	(Sri Lanka)	10 June 1991 (age 35)	Right	Slow left-arm wrist-spin	
Bowlers
–	**Lasith Malinga**	(Sri Lanka)	28 August 1983 (age 42)	Right	Right-arm fast	Captain will not play for this team in clt20
–	Sachith Pathirana	(Sri Lanka)	21 March 1989 (age 37)	Left	Left-arm orthodox	
–	Charith Jayampathi	(Sri Lanka)	1 February 1991 (age 35)	Left	Left-arm medium fast	
—	Danushka Gunathilaka	(Sri Lanka)	17 March 1991 (age 35)	Left	Right-arm off break	
—	Kasun Madushanka	(Sri Lanka)	16 July 1991 (age 35)	Right	Right-arm fast-medium	
–	Binura Fernando	(Sri Lanka)	12 July 1995 (age 31)	Right	Left-arm Medium-fast	
–	Ishan Jayaratne	(Sri Lanka)	26 June 1989 (age 37)	Right	Right-arm fast-medium	

== See also ==
- 2014 Super 4's T20
- Sri Lanka Cricket
