= Champions League Twenty20 =

Former International Twenty20 cricket tournament

- Tournament logo
- Format: Twenty20
- First edition: 2009
- Latest edition: 2014
- Next edition: 2026 World Club Championship
- Tournament format: Round-robin and knockout
- Current champion: Chennai Super Kings (2nd title)
- Most successful: (India) Chennai Super Kings (India) Mumbai Indians (2 titles each)
- Most runs: Suresh Raina (973)
- Most wickets: Sunil Narine (39)

The Champions League Twenty20, also known as the CLT20, is an international T20 franchise cricket tournament. The event was first introduced with a view of replicating FIFA Club World Cup in cricket with branding taken from UEFA Champions League. It replaced International 20:20 Club Championship as the T20 World championship for club teams. The competition was launched in 2008 with the first edition held in October 2009. It was jointly owned by the Board of Control for Cricket in India, Cricket Australia and Cricket South Africa.

The last champions were the Chennai Super Kings, who won their second title in 2014. It had a total prize pool of US$6 million, with the winning team receiving $2.5 million, the highest for a franchise cricket tournament in history. The format involved qualifying teams from T20 competitions of eight Test-playing nations, favouring the teams from India, Australia and South Africa.

Owing to poor viewing figures, a lack of audience interest and unstable sponsorship, the three founding cricket boards announced in July 2015 that the tournament would be cancelled, making the 2014 edition the last of the tournament. In 2025, it was revealed the event was making a return after ICC and key member countries backed the idea. The tournament is expected to be hosted in England with group stages and knockout rounds. The revival aims to boost global franchise cricket viewership and commercial opportunities. ICC involvement and final details remain pending.

== History ==
=== Background ===
Twenty20 cricket was launched by the England and Wales Cricket Board in 2003 with the Twenty20 Cup as a result of a long-term decline in the popularity of county championship and domestic limited-overs cricket. By shortening matches to around three hours, the format was designed to attract a younger crowd and boost attendances. Cricketing nations began adopting the format and creating domestic Twenty20 competitions.

This was followed by the creation of international Twenty20 tournaments. The International 20:20 Club Championship was an early attempt at an international Twenty20 club tournament. It was held in 2005 and featured domestic Twenty20 teams from three countries. Twenty20 International, the form of Twenty20 played between national cricket teams, began in February 2005 and the ICC World Twenty20, the Twenty20 version of the Cricket World Cup, was first held in September 2007.

=== Creation ===
Immediately after the end of the first season of the Indian Premier League, the cricket authorities in India, Australia and South Africa entered into discussions to create a new international club competition and capitalise on this success. The plans for the creation of the Champions League Twenty20 were first announced on 13 September 2007. The inaugural edition was to be held in October 2008, run by the cricket boards of India, England, Australia and South Africa, and featuring two teams from each country.

However, the tournament encountered problems when the Board of Control for Cricket in India (BCCI), which owns 50% of the tournament, decided to bar players from the Indian Cricket League (ICL; a league unsanctioned by the BCCI and other cricket boards as a result) from participating. England featured ICL players in many of their teams, including their domestic tournament's runners-up the Kent Spitfires. The BCCI decided to replace Kent's slot with a team from Pakistan and was prepared to also replace the remaining England team. In response, ECB devised plans for their own Champions League. ECB eventually agreed to the terms from the BCCI. The CLT20 was founded by the BCCI, Cricket Australia and Cricket South Africa with one team from England and $6 million in prize money.

Following this, another problem arose with the International Cricket Council over the tournament dates, which clashed with the ICC Champions Trophy, and the CLT20 was moved to December 2008. Plans were also made for the second edition to be held in late 2009 with 12 teams. In November 2008, the tournament was again put in jeopardy when Mumbai suffered terrorist attacks and the organisers attempted to reschedule again to early 2009. In December 2008, it was finally pushed to September 2009, when it was successfully held as per the plans for the 2009 edition.

== Reception and impact ==
The tournament received strong support from its creation. Its $6 million prize money pool was described by the organisers as "the single largest prize money pool in any cricket tournament so far." ESPN Star Sports paid $900 million for the global broadcasting rights to every match for 10 years, a deal comparable to when Sony Entertainment Television and World Sport Group purchased the rights to the Indian Premier League (IPL) for $1.026 billion for ten years. Ahead of the 2009 edition, Bharti Airtel bought the title sponsorship rights for three years for reportedly $40 million.

Despite this, the inaugural 2009 edition, held in India was not highly received by its targeted Indian audience, who only showed interest for the IPL teams. This was demonstrated by low attendance and television ratings. According to TAM Media Research, it drew an average television ratings point of 1.06, much lower than the 4.1 achieved by the 2009 Indian Premier League. Low viewership led to Bharti Airtel ending its five-year sponsorship deal after two years. Nokia signed a four-year deal to replace Bharti Airtel as the title sponsor but also withdrew after one year. Karbonn Mobiles replaced Nokia in 2012. From 2014 onwards Oppo bagged the title sponsorship rights.

Several attempts were made at improving reception. The marketing campaign for 2010 included television commercials featuring Bollywood stars while the 2011 edition had Shahrukh Khan as brand ambassador and an opening ceremony featuring international hip-hop artists. The ratings for the 2010 edition, held in South Africa, improved to 1.45. This is attributed to better performances by the IPL teams: the final, won by the Kolkata Knight Riders, drew an all-India rating of 3.30 while matches with the Mumbai Indians had an average rating of 2.11. The tournament format was changed in 2011 to introduce a three-day qualifying stage which allowed the inclusion of a fourth IPL team and weaker teams to be eliminated early. The 2011 edition saw the average rating increase to 1.64 but depended on IPL teams featuring in both semi-finals and the final.

Television ratings
Edition	Average rating
2009	1.06
2010	1.45
2011	1.64

Despite low viewership, the tournament succeeded in providing a global stage and significant financial support for low-profile teams. Players have also capitalised on the opportunity to further their careers in Twenty20 cricket. Kieron Pollard helped Trinidad and Tobago finish runners-up in the 2009 edition, including an innings where he scored 54 runs off 18 balls. This earned him an IPL contract at the 2009 IPL players auction where he was sold for an undisclosed amount after attracting the maximum possible bid of $750,000. Sunil Narine and Kevon Cooper also earned IPL contracts after competing for Trinidad and Tobago in the 2011 edition. Previously relatively unknown, Narine and Cooper were sold for $700,000 and $50,000 respectively at the 2012 IPL auction and made immediate impacts to their teams. In particular, Narine helped his team win the 2012 Indian Premier League and was named Player of the Tournament. Similarly, in the 2012 edition, Chris Morris helped Highveld Lions to reach the final and in return it earned him an IPL contract at the 2013 IPL auction where he was bought by Chennai Super Kings for US$625,000, 51 times his base price.

== Format ==
Although each edition held had a different format and had a different number of participating teams, each had a group stage and a two-round knockout stage. A qualifying stage was introduced in 2011, reducing direct entrants to only teams from India, South Africa and Australia. Each team (including qualifying stage participants) receives a participation fee of $500,000. Every edition had a total prize money of $6 million. Since 2010, it had been distributed as follows:

- $2.5 million – Winners
- $1.3 million – Runners-up
- $500,000 – 2nd and 3rd Runners-up
- $200,000 – Teams eliminated in the group stage

Before the commencement of the tournament, each team names a squad of 15 players. All players must be contracted by the team for their domestic tournament. Mirroring the IPL rule, each team can field a maximum of four international players. Most of the other tournaments have a lower limit on both contracted international players and how many can play in their matches. In 2011, an exception to the rule was made for the Mumbai Indians who, due to players being unavailable, had a squad of seven Indian players and would have been unable to put together a playing team of eleven players should another be injured. They were allowed to field five international players. That year, Mumbai won the CLT20.

=== Players ===
Should a player be a part of more than one qualified team, he can play for his "home" team (the team from the country he is eligible to represent in international cricket) without consequence. If he plays for any other team, that team must pay the home team a compensation fee ($150,000 from 2011). Indian Premier League teams have been the most popular choice for the players. In the 2010 edition, controversy arose when an IPL team contractually forced three players to play for them by utilising a clause in the rules of the IPL. The clause states that the IPL teams have first rights over their players should they qualify with another team.

The choice of the players and the nature of the rules are common subjects of debate with every edition. It continued to cause confusion until 2013 when it was clarified that the CLT20 rules state the players are free to choose their team. However, for a player named in an IPL team's squad, he would have to forego 20% of his salary to choose another team. The IPL offers the most lucrative salaries and is the only tournament to have a clause relating to the CLT20 in its contracts. As a result, players are unlikely to choose against their IPL teams. For non-IPL teams wanting to keep their players, not only would they be forfeiting the compensation fee, some have felt the need to offer their players compensation in an attempt to sway their decision.

The only player to have chosen another team over his IPL team was Kumar Sangakkara in 2013. His team, the Kandurata Maroons, lost all their matches and did not advance beyond the qualifying stage. This incentive was lessened when IPL contracts were changed in 2014 to not have player salaries cover participation in the CLT20. A player will instead receive an additional 10% of his IPL salary for representing his IPL team in the CLT20.

=== Participation ===
2014 qualification tournaments
Tournament	Teams
Direct entrants
Indian Premier League	3
Big Bash League	2
Ram Slam T20 Challenge	2
Caribbean Premier League	1
Qualifying stage entrants
HRV Cup	1
National Twenty20 Cup	1
Sri Lanka Premier League	1
Indian Premier League	1

The participating teams are from the top cricketing nations and determined by the premier Twenty20 tournaments of those nations. Each edition has featured teams from India, Australia, South Africa, New Zealand, the West Indies and Sri Lanka. England have been in three editions but refused further participation after 2012 as their domestic season clashed with the tournament's dates. Pakistan has not been invited to participate in the tournament until 2012 due to the hostility between India and Pakistan since the 2008 Mumbai attacks.

As the tournament is mainly targeted at the Indian audience, all editions have featured more teams from India than any other country. From 2011, four Indian teams competed while other countries had two teams at most. India is the first choice for hosting the tournament.

While the tournament format remained almost unchanged, the qualification tournaments have changed to include more overseas players and create stronger teams. The Caribbean Twenty20 was created in the West Indies after their representative finished runners-up in the 2009 edition. It was later expanded to become the Caribbean Premier League in 2013. Australia and Sri Lanka have expanded their tournaments to create the Big Bash League in 2011 and the Sri Lanka Premier League in 2012 respectively.

Participation in the tournament is highly desired. Since the Bangladesh Premier League was created in 2012, its organisers had hoped for their teams to be included in the tournament. A Bangladeshi team has yet to participate in the CLT20. The Dhaka Gladiators, winners of the 2013 BPL, expressed their disappointment after being excluded in 2013 despite the efforts made by their management.

=== Venue ===
It was originally intended for the host of the tournament to be rotated between the countries of the three shareholders: India, South Africa and Australia. The broadcasting agreement also demands that at least six of the first ten editions are to be held in India. However, Australia was not considered due to its unsuitable weather in September and due to its time zone being undesirable for the broadcaster. South Africa first hosted in 2010 but India has since been the first preference for hosting. South Africa was only chosen to host in 2012 when situations made it infeasible for India to host.

== Editions and results ==
Year	Host	Final				Teams		Ref
Year	Host	Venue	Winners	Result	Runners-up	GRP	TOT	Ref
2009; Details	India	Rajiv Gandhi International Cricket Stadium, Hyderabad	New South Wales Blues; 159 for 9 (20 overs)	Won by 41 runs Scorecard	Trinidad and Tobago; 118 all out (15.5 overs)	12		
2010; Details	South Africa	New Wanderers Stadium, Johannesburg	Chennai Super Kings; 132 for 2 (19 overs)	Won by 8 wickets Scorecard	Warriors; 128 for 6 (20 overs)	10		
2011; Details	India	MA Chidambaram Stadium, Chennai	Mumbai Indians; 139 all out (20 overs)	Won by 31 runs Scorecard	Royal Challengers Bangalore; 108 all out (19.2 overs)	10	13	
2012; Details	South Africa	New Wanderers Stadium, Johannesburg	Sydney Sixers; 124 for 0 (12.3 overs)	Won by 10 wickets Scorecard	Lions; 121 all out (20 overs)	10	14	
2013; Details	India	Feroz Shah Kotla Ground, New Delhi	Mumbai Indians; 202 for 6 (20 overs)	Won by 33 runs Scorecard	Rajasthan Royals; 169 all out (18.5 overs)	10	12	
2014; Details	India	M. Chinnaswamy Stadium, Bangalore	Chennai Super Kings; 185 for 2 (18.3 overs)	Won by 8 wickets Scorecard	Kolkata Knight Riders; 180 for 6 (20 overs)	10	12	

== Statistics and records ==
As of the 2012 edition, 30 teams have competed in 103 matches. Individual players have appeared in as many as four editions and 20 matches. Four players have scored centuries, 16 players have taken four wickets in an innings and three players have taken five wickets in an innings. One player has taken a hat-trick.

=== Titles and performance ===
The table below provides an overview of the performances of teams over past editions of the Champions League Twenty20.

Team	Year(s) qualified	Times qualified	Times won	Best result
Chennai Super Kings	2010–2014	5	2	Champions (2010, 2014)
Mumbai Indians	2010–2014	5	2	Champions (2011, 2013)
Sydney Sixers	2012	1	1	Champions (2012)
New South Wales Blues	2009–2011	2	1	Champions (2009)
Royal Challengers Bengaluru	2009–2011	3	0	Runners-up (2011)
Kolkata Knight Riders	2011–2014	3	0	Runners-up (2014)
Rajasthan Royals	2013	1	0	Runners-up (2013)
Highveld Lions	2010–2013	3	0	Runners-up (2012)
Warriors	2010–2011	2	0	Runners-up (2010)
Trinidad and Tobago	2009–2013	5	0	Runners-up (2009)
Hobart Hurricanes	2014	1	0	Semifinals (2014)
Punjab Kings	2014	1	0	Semifinals (2014)
Delhi Capitals	2009–2012	2	0	Semifinals (2012)
Titans	2012–2013	2	0	Semifinals (2012)
Somerset	2009–2011	2	0	Semifinals (2011)
Southern Redbacks	2010–2011	2	0	Semifinals (2010)
Cape Cobras	2009–2014	3	0	Semifinals (2009)
Victorian Bushrangers	2009–2010	2	0	Semifinals (2009)
Perth Scorchers	2012–2014	3	0	Group stage (2014)
Barbados Royals	2014	1	0	Group stage (2014)
Dolphins	2014	1	0	Group stage (2014)
Lahore Lions	2014	1	0	Group stage (2014)
Northern Knights	2014	1	0	Group stage (2014)
Otago Volts	2009–2013	2	0	Group stage (2013)
Brisbane Heat	2013	1	0	Group stage (2013)
Sunrisers Hyderabad	2013	1	0	Group stage (2013)
Auckland Aces	2011–2012	2	0	Group stage (2012)
Yorkshire Carnegie	2012	1	0	Group stage (2012)
Wayamba	2009–2010	2	0	Group stage (2010)
Central Stags	2010	1	0	Group stage (2010)
Guyana	2010	1	0	Group stage (2010)
Deccan Chargers	2009	1	0	Group stage (2009)
Diamond Eagles	2009	1	0	Second round (2009)
Sussex Sharks	2009	1	0	Group stage (2009)

Notes

- The table is sorted based on the number of titles, then best performance (newest to oldest), number of appearances, and then by alphabetical order. League and group stages are considered equivalent
- Apart from the champions, all other performances are taken on the latest performance basis

Source: Cricinfo

=== Other teams ===
Some teams participated only in the qualifying tournaments and never reached the group stage of the tournament.

Team	Span	Appearances	Best performance
Southern Express	2014 – 2014	1	Qualifying stage (2014)
Faisalabad Wolves	2013 – 2013	1	Qualifying stage (2013)
Kandurata Maroons	2013 – 2013	1	Qualifying stage (2013)
Hampshire	2012 – 2012	1	Qualifying stage (2012)
Sialkot Stallions	2012 – 2012	1	Qualifying stage (2012)
Uva Next	2012 – 2012	1	Qualifying stage (2012)
Leicestershire Foxes	2011 – 2011	1	Qualifying stage (2011)
Ruhuna Royals	2011 – 2011	1	Qualifying stage (2011)

Note:

- The table is sorted based on the number of appearances, then latest year of best result, and then by alphabetical order

Source: Cricinfo

== See also ==
- Global Super League
