= Dhananjaya de Silva =

Sri Lankan cricketer (born 1991)

Personal information
- Born: 6 September 1991 (age 35); Hambantota, Sri Lanka
- Height: 5 ft 8 in (1.73 m)
- Batting: Right-handed
- Bowling: Right-arm off break
- Role: Batting All-rounder

International information
- National side: Sri Lanka (2015–present)
- Test debut (cap 135): 26 July 2016 v Australia
- Last Test: 9 November 2026 v Pakistan
- ODI debut (cap 169): 16 June 2016 v Ireland
- Last ODI: 27 January 2026 v England
- T20I debut (cap 53): 30 July 2015 v Pakistan
- Last T20I: 30 January 2026 v England

Domestic team information
- Years: Team
- Badureliya SC
- Kandurata Maroons
- Ragama CC
- 2016–present: Tamil Union
- 2020: Jaffna Stallions
- 2021: Colombo Stars
- 2024: Khulna Tigers

Career statistics
Competition	Test	ODI	T20I	FC
Matches	70	93	48	159
Runs scored	4,598	1,924	890	10,480
Batting average	39.98	25.65	20.69	41.75
100s/50s	14/20	0/10	0/3	30/51
Top score	173	93	66*	173
Balls bowled	4,305	2,370	310	10,152
Wickets	44	48	17	177
Bowling average	53.97	41.89	20.76	30.81
5 wickets in innings	0	0	0	5
10 wickets in match	0	0	0	1
Best bowling	3/25	3/32	2/22	7/59
Catches/stumpings	92/–	42/–	22/–	177/–
- Source: ESPNcricinfo, 13 November 2026

Dhananjaya Maduranga de Silva (Sinhala: ධනංජය මදුරංග ද සිල්වා; born 6 September 1991) is a Sri Lankan professional cricketer, who plays for Sri Lanka in all formats of the game and for Tamil Union in domestic cricket and former captain of the national team in Test cricket. In November 2017, he was named the Test batsman of the year for the 2016–17 season at Sri Lanka Cricket's annual awards.

== Personal life ==
de Silva was born on 6 September 1991 at Hambantota as the second son of a family of three brothers. de Silva started his cricket career at Deberawewa National School in Tissamaharama, Hambanthota. After he move to Galle, he then briefly attended Mahanama College Colombo, before moving to Richmond College, Galle. He played his senior school cricket at Richmond College, Galle and captained the Richmond first XI cricket team in the 2010/2011 season.

de Silva's father, Ranjan de Silva was a politician. On 25 May 2018, his father was murdered by an unidentified gunman in front of their Ratmalana house. With the sudden death of his father, de Silva withdrew from the Sri Lankan squad for the West Indies tour. However, he participated in the tour from second match onwards.

== Domestic career ==
In March 2018, de Silva was named as the vice-captain of the Colombo squad for the 2017–18 Super Four Provincial Tournament. The following month, he was also named in Colombo's squad for the 2018 Super Provincial One Day Tournament.

In August 2018, de Silva was named in Galle's squad the 2018 SLC T20 League. In March 2019, he was named in Galle's squad for the 2019 Super Provincial One Day Tournament. Following the conclusion of the competition, he was named the player of the tournament. In October 2020, he was drafted by the Jaffna Stallions for the inaugural edition of the Lanka Premier League. In August 2021, he was named as the captain of the SLC Blues team for the 2021 SLC Invitational T20 League tournament. In July 2022, he was signed by the Jaffna Kings for the third edition of the Lanka Premier League.

== International career ==
=== International debut ===
In July 2015, de Silva was named in Sri Lanka's Twenty20 International (T20I) squad for their series against Pakistan. He made his T20I debut on 30 July 2015. He scored 31 runs in his debut match, which Sri Lanka lost.

de Silva made his One Day International (ODI) debut against Ireland on 16 June 2016, and received the 169th Sri Lankan ODI cap.

In July 2016, de Silva was named in Sri Lanka's Test squad for their series against Australia. On 26 July 2016, he made his Test debut for Sri Lanka against Australia. He became the first player for Sri Lanka to get off the mark in a Test match by scoring a six and the fifth overall. He took his first Test wicket by dismissing Peter Nevill in the second innings of the match.

=== Cementing permanent slot ===
de Silva's maiden Test century came during the third Test of same Australian series. Sri Lanka were in trouble at 5/26, when de Silva joined Dinesh Chandimal. The two shared a century partnership and de Silva scored maiden ton of his career. de Silva was the highest run scorer in the series with 325 runs, including one century and one fifty, at an average of 65.00. Sri Lanka whitewashed Australia for the first time.

After Sri Lanka's Tillakaratne Dilshan retired from ODIs, de Silva was promoted to his slot of opening position. He scored 76 runs after opening the batting for the first time. This score stands as the highest score by a Sri Lankan opening the batting for the first time, beating Saman Jayantha's score of 74 in 2004. His poor performances against South Africa had him dropped from the opening slot, but was played as a middle order batsman.

de Silva continued his good performance throughout the two Tests against Zimbabwe. In the first match, he scored a fifty. Zimbabwe made 411 while chasing, with Sri Lanka winning the match. During the second Test, de Silva made a 142-run partnership with Upul Tharanga. Tharanga was out caught at slip and de Silva continued his innings by scoring his second Test century, in his fifth Test match of his career.

=== Ups and downs ===
With poor performances in South Africa, de Silva was dropped from all squads. He was not initially included in Sri Lanka's ODI squad for the 2017 ICC Champions Trophy. However, Kusal Perera was ruled out of the tournament with a hamstring injury, and de Silva was called up to the squad. But he could not capitalize his worthiness in the squad and was dropped from the Sri Lankan squad after the Champions Trophy.

de Silva was recalled to the ODI series against India. de Silva was recalled to the Test squad for the third Test against India in 2017. He was dismissed for single run in the first innings. However, in the second innings, de Silva scored his third Test century. Shortly after, de Silva walked off the field with a thigh injury. The match was drawn. His unbeaten 119 was the highest fourth-innings score by a visiting batsman in India.

During the first Test against Bangladesh in Chittagong, de Silva scored his fourth Test century, which was his second consecutive century following the Delhi Test against India in the previous year. He along with Kusal Mendis made an unbeaten 187-run partnership at the end of second day of the match. On third day, the two piled 308-run partnership until de Silva was dismissed for 173 off Mustafizur Rahman. This was his highest Test score and he also passed 1,000 Test runs in his 23rd innings during the match, becoming joint-fastest Sri Lankan batsman to reach 1,000 Test runs along with Roy Dias and Michael Vandort. In May 2018, he was one of 33 cricketers to be awarded a national contract by Sri Lanka Cricket ahead of the 2018–19 season.

=== Comeback to the T20I side ===
de Silva was always in and out in the T20I squad since his debut in 2015 against Pakistan. However, after strong performances in Test and ODIs, Dhananjaya was included to the one-off T20I against South Africa on 14 August 2018. In the match, he showcased an all-round performance, with South Africa being bowled out for 99 runs, which was their lowest score in T20Is. During the chase, with Dinesh Chandimal, he made a 53-run partnership, guiding the team to victory. Due to his all-round performances, de Silva won the man of the match award.

=== Permanent middle order ===
In April 2019, de Silva was named in Sri Lanka's squad for the 2019 Cricket World Cup. During the match against England, he took three wickets in nine deliveries to deliver a 20-run win over England. This was Sri Lanka's fourth consecutive win against England in World Cups.

On 15 December 2019, during the first Test against Pakistan, de Silva scored his sixth Test century. With his unbeaten century, Sri Lanka posted 308 in first innings in a rain affected match, with the match finishing as a draw.

On 1 March 2020, in the third ODI against the West Indies, de Silva injured his wrist during the match. He was later ruled out of the T20I series against the West Indies. In December 2020, he toured South Africa for a two-Test match series. In the Boxing Day Test match, he scored his seventh 50 and strengthened the first innings along with Dinesh Chandimal. However, he retired hurt when on 79, after showing severe discomfort, collapsing to the ground, and had to be helped off the field and into the dressing room. After an MRI scan after the close of play, he confirmed a tear of about 20% or 30% and needed two weeks for recovery. He was immediately released from the rest of the series.

During the first Test match against Bangladesh in May 2021, de Silva scored his seventh Test century. He batted for the entire fourth day, with Sri Lankan captain Dimuth Karunaratne, without losing a wicket and put on record breaking partnership. Their partnership is a record for any wicket in a Test match in Kandy. In September 2021, de Silva was named in Sri Lanka's squad for the 2021 ICC Men's T20 World Cup. In June 2022, he was named in the Sri Lanka A squad for their matches against Australia A during Australia's tour of Sri Lanka. During the Test series against Australia, Dananjaya contracted COVID-19 and was ruled out of the second Test in Galle, along with fellow players Asitha Fernando and Jeffrey Vandersay.

On 1 November 2022, de Silva hit fifty and therefore Sri Lanka held a six-wicket lead over Afghanistan. On 20 March 2023, de silva hit half century against New Zealand at Wellington. He missed his 10th Test Century by just 2 runs. In this innings he scored 98 runs.

In May 2024, he was named in Sri Lanka's squad for the 2024 ICC Men's T20 World Cup tournament.

=== Test captaincy ===
Following the resignation of Test captain Dimuth Karunaratne, de Silva was appointed as the 18th Test captain of Sri Lanka team. Against Afghanistan in February 2024, he led Sri Lanka to the victory and win the one-off test series.

Against Bangladesh in March 2024, de Silva scored a century in the first innings and made 202-run sixth-wicket stand with Kamindu Mendis, who also scored a century. Both of them were dismissed for 102, where Sri Lanka posted 280 runs in the first innings. In the second innings, he made another century and a century partnership with Kamindu, who also made a century. This was only the third instance, where two players from the same team made twin hundreds in a Test match. Finally Sri Lanka won the match by 328 runs and de Silva won the man of the match award.

== International centuries ==
Dhananjaya has made 14 international centuries in Test cricket.

=== Key ===
- * – Remained not out
- ‡ – Captain of Sri Lanka in that match
- † – Man of the match

=== Test centuries ===
Test centuries scored by Dhananjaya de Silva
No.	Score	Against	Pos.	Inn.	Test	Venue	H/A/N	Date	Result	Ref
1	129	Australia	7	1	3/3	Sinhalese Sports Club Cricket Ground, Colombo	Home	13 August 2016	Won	
2	127	Zimbabwe	6	1	2/2	Harare Sports Club, Harare	Away	6 November 2016	Won	
3	119*	India	3	4	3/3	Feroz Shah Kotla Stadium, Delhi	Away	2 December 2017	Drawn	
4	173	Bangladesh	3	2	1/2	Zahur Ahmed Chowdhury Stadium, Chittagong	Away	31 January 2018	Drawn	
5	109	New Zealand	6	1	2/2	P. Sara Oval, Colombo	Home	22 August 2019	Lost	
6	102*	Pakistan	6	1	1/2	Rawalpindi Cricket Stadium, Rawalpindi	Away	1 December 2019	Drawn	
7	166	Bangladesh	5	2	1/2	Pallekele International Cricket Stadium, Kandy	Home	21 April 2021	Drawn	
8	155*	West Indies	5	3	2/2	Galle International Cricket Stadium, Galle	Home	29 November 2021	Won	
9	109	Pakistan	7	3	2/2	Galle International Cricket Stadium, Galle	Home	24 July 2022	Won	
10	122	Pakistan	6	1	1/2	Galle International Cricket Stadium, Galle	Home	16 July 2023	Lost	
11	102 ‡ †	Bangladesh	6	1	1/2	Sylhet International Cricket Stadium, Sylhet	Away	22 March 2024	Won	
12	108 ‡ †	Bangladesh	6	3	1/2	Sylhet International Cricket Stadium, Sylhet	Away	22 March 2024	Won	
13	120 ‡	West Indies	5	1	1/2	Sir Vivian Richards Stadium, Antigua	Away	25 June 2026	Lost	
14	167	Pakistan	5	2	1/2	Rawalpindi Cricket Stadium, Rawalpindi	Away	9 November 2026	Drawn	

== Achievements ==
- Sri Lanka Cricket Best Men's Test All-rounder of the Year: 2025
