= Seekkuge Prasanna =

Sri Lankan cricketer

Seekkuge Prasanna සීක්කුගේ ප්‍රසන්න
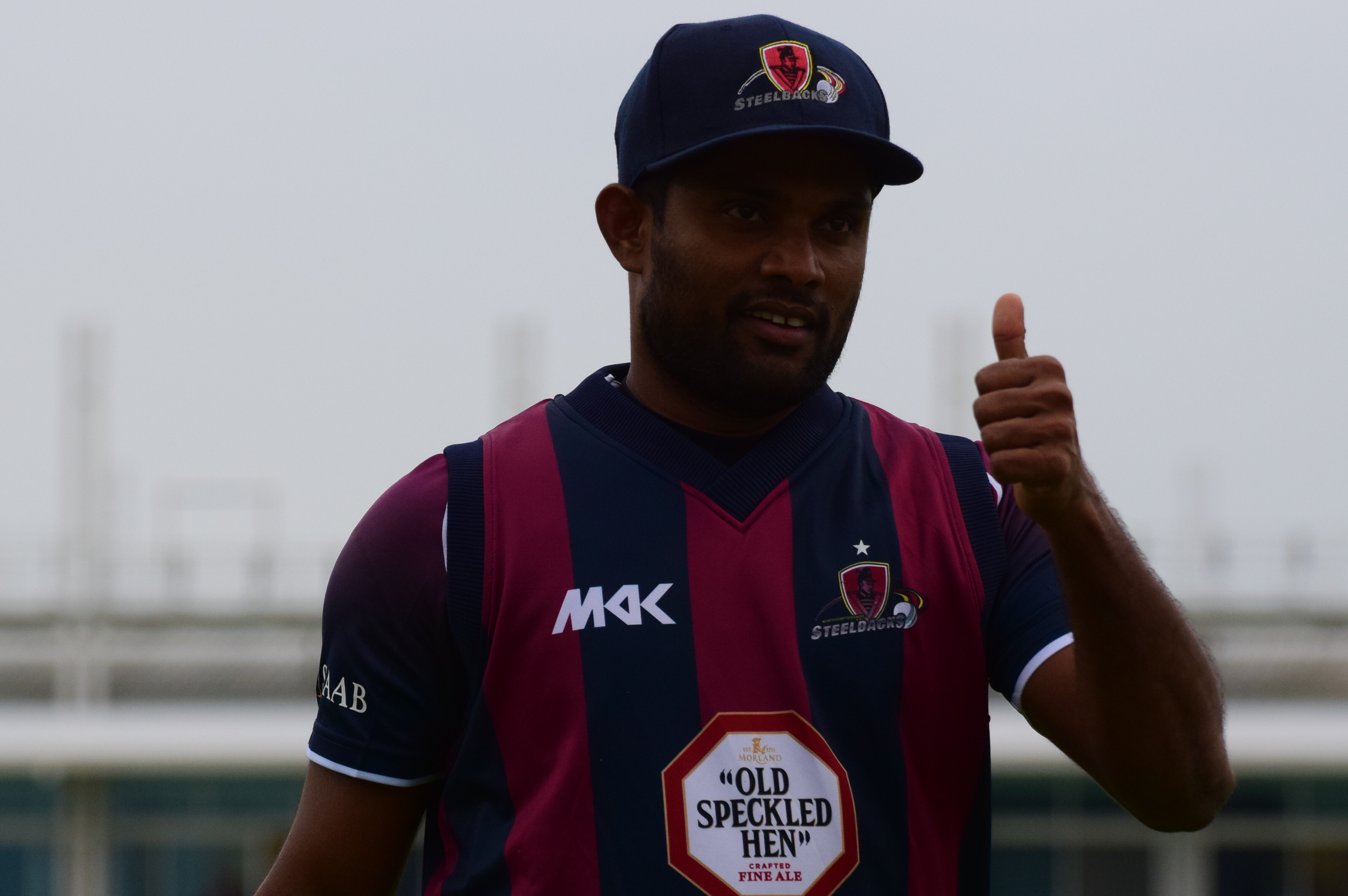

Personal information
- Full name: Seekkuge Prasanna
- Born: 27 June 1985 (age 41); Balapitiya, Sri Lanka
- Height: 5 ft 9 in (1.75 m)
- Batting: Right-handed
- Bowling: Right-arm leg break
- Role: Bowling all-rounder

International information
- National side: Sri Lanka (2011–2023)
- Only Test (cap 117): 8 September 2011 v Australia
- ODI debut (cap 148): 20 August 2011 v Australia
- Last ODI: 5 January 2019 v New Zealand
- ODI shirt no.: 41
- T20I debut (cap 51): 13 December 2013 v Pakistan
- Last T20I: 29 October 2017 v Pakistan

Domestic team information
- Years: Team
- 2006–present: Sri Lanka Army
- 2008–2010: Kandurata
- 2012–2013: Basnahira
- 2012: Uva Next
- 2014: Southern Express
- 2015: Barisal Bulls
- 2016: Hambantota Troopers
- 2016–2018: Northamptonshire
- 2016: Dhaka Dynamites
- 2017: Khulna Titans
- 2019: Rajshahi Kings
- 2019: Trinbago Knight Riders
- 2020: Lahore Qalandars
- 2020: Kandy Tuskers
- 2021: Colombo Stars
- 2022: Khulna Tigers

Career statistics
Competition	Test	ODI	T20I
Matches	1	40	20
Runs scored	5	421	214
Batting average	5.00	12.38	15.28
100s/50s	0/0	0/2	0/0
Top score	5	95	37*
Balls bowled	138	1,945	300
Wickets	0	32	10
Bowling average	–	55.21	35.90
5 wickets in innings	–	0	0
10 wickets in match	–	0	0
Best bowling	–	3/32	2/45
Catches/stumpings	0/–	7/–	4/–
- Source: Cricinfo, 5 January 2019
- Military career
- Born: 27 June 1985 (age 41); Balapitiya, Sri Lanka
- Allegiance: Sri Lanka
- Branch: Sri Lanka Army
- Rank: Warrant Officer I
- Unit: Sri Lanka Army Ordnance Corps

Seekkuge Prasanna (Sinhala: සීක්කුගේ ප්‍රසන්න; born 27 June 1985) is a former Sri Lankan cricketer, who played limited overs cricket. He is a warrant officer in the Sri Lankan Army. Prasanna is known for aggressive batting at the late overs in ODIs, and a useful leg-spinner, probably the best found after former Sri Lanka leg-spinner Upul Chandana. Prasanna was a member of the Sri Lankan team that won the 2014 ICC World Twenty20.

== Domestic and T20 career ==
In March 2019, he was named in Colombo's squad for the 2019 Super Provincial One Day Tournament. In October 2020, he was drafted by the Kandy Tuskers for the inaugural edition of the Lanka Premier League.

In April 2021, he was signed by Lahore Qalandars to play in the rescheduled matches in the 2021 Pakistan Super League. In August 2021, he was named in the SLC Reds team for the 2021 SLC Invitational T20 League tournament. In November 2021, he was selected to play for the Colombo Stars following the players' draft for the 2021 Lanka Premier League. In July 2022, he was signed by the Colombo Stars for the third edition of the Lanka Premier League.

== International career ==
Prasanna made his Test cricket debut for Sri Lanka on 8 September 2011 at Pallekele International Cricket Stadium against Australia. The ODI debut came against Australia at the same series in 2011. His Twenty20 International debut came against Pakistan at the UAE in 2013.

Prasanna was not in the original squad in 2015 ICC Cricket World Cup, but he was called into the World Cup squad as a replacement for injured Dimuth Karunaratne. He played his first World Cup game against Scotland on 11 March 2015.

=== Power hitting ===
After dropped from the squad due to poor performances, Prasanna rejoined to the limited over Sri Lanka squad for game against Ireland in 2016. On 18 June 2016, in the second match against Ireland, Prasanna scored a devastating inning which earned him his highest ODI score. He got out for 95 runs just off 45 balls, just fell short for the fastest century for Sri Lanka. Sri Lanka scored 377 runs in the match and finally won the match by 136 runs.

His devastating form in Ireland continued in England. During the first ODI against England, Prasanna scored 25 ball 59 runs, including four huge sixes. However, the match ended with a tie. Prasanna scored 95 at strike rate 206.52 against Ireland in last ODI and 59 at 210.71 in this match. With that Prasanna became the third Sri Lanka player after Sanath Jayasuriya and Thisara Perera to make 2 fifty-plus scores at a strike rate of 200-plus in ODIs.

During the third T20I against South Africa in the decider, Prasanna helped Sri Lanka to win the match and seal the series 2–1 by hitting match-winning 16-ball 37 runs in the last overs with three sixes and three fours. This win gave Sri Lankans their first ever series win in any format against South Africa in South Africa as well. This is also Sri Lanka's highest chase in all T20Is.

== Military career ==
He is currently serving in the Sri Lanka Army as a Warrant Officer I attached to the 2nd Regiment, Sri Lanka Army Ordnance Corps, promoted on 1 March 2017.

== See also ==
- One-Test wonder
