= Suraj Randiv =

Sri Lankan former professional cricketer (born 1985)

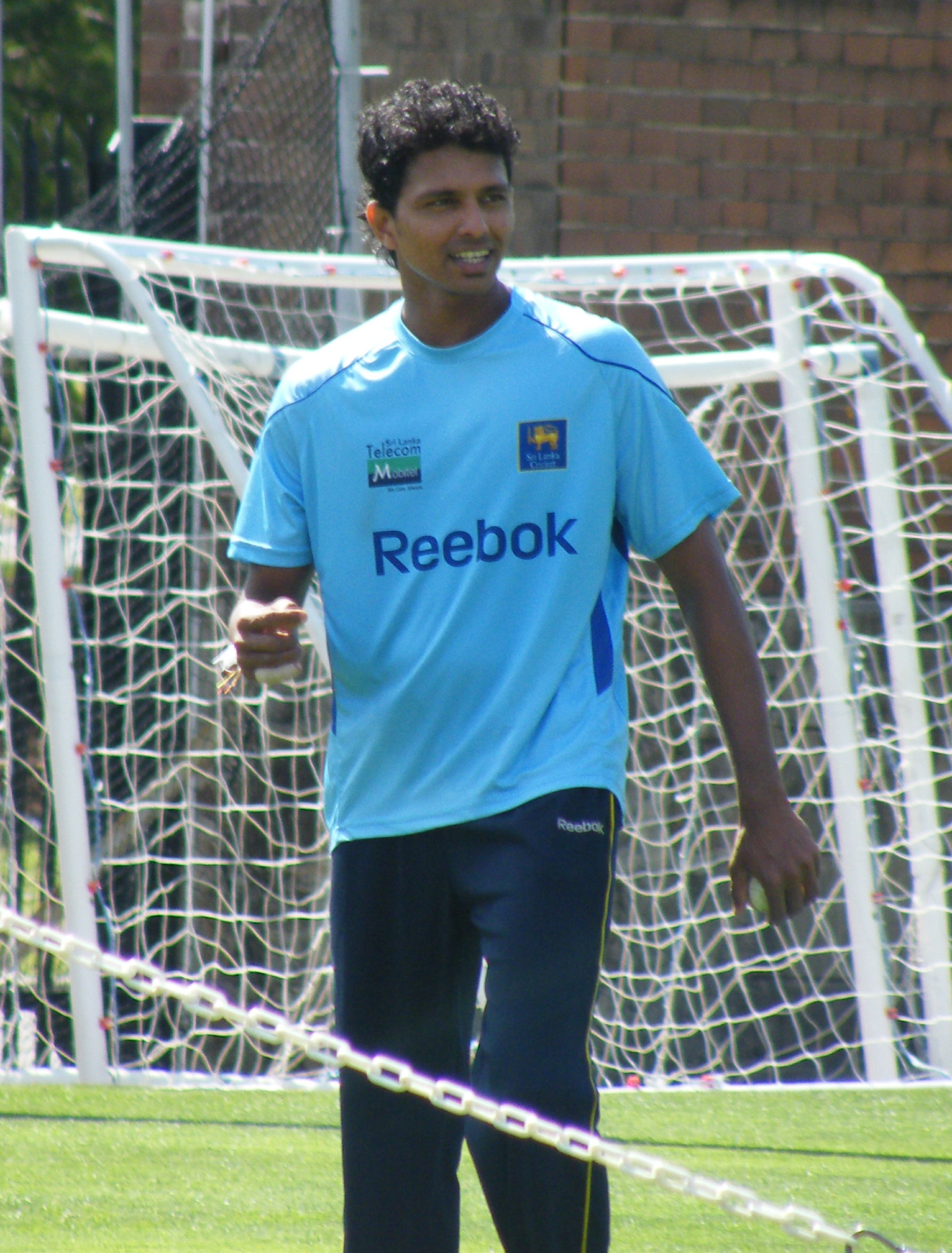

Personal information
- Full name: Hewa Kaluhalamullage Suraj Randiv Kaluhalamulla
- Born: 30 January 1985 (age 41); Matara, Sri Lanka
- Height: 6 ft 2 in (1.88 m)
- Batting: Right-handed
- Bowling: Right-arm offbreak
- Role: All-rounder

International information
- National side: Sri Lanka (2009–2016)
- Test debut (cap 113): 26 July 2010 v India
- Last Test: 25 November 2012 v New Zealand
- ODI debut (cap 139): 18 December 2009 v India
- Last ODI: 24 June 2016 v England
- T20I debut (cap 35): 3 May 2010 v Zimbabwe
- Last T20I: 25 June 2011 v England

Domestic team information
- Years: Team
- 2004–2007: Sinhalese Sports Club
- 2005: Southern Province
- 2007: Nondescripts Cricket Club
- 2008–2010: Kandurata Kites
- 2008–: Bloomfield Cricket and Athletic Club
- 2011–: Ruhuna Rhinos
- 2011–2012: Chennai Super Kings

Career statistics
Competition	Test	ODI	T20I	FC
Matches	12	31	7	127
Runs scored	147	280	8	3,090
Batting average	9.18	17.50	4.00	21.16
100s/50s	0/0	0/1	0/0	3/10
Top score	39	56	6	112
Balls bowled	3,146	1,437	126	26,331
Wickets	43	36	7	578
Bowling average	37.51	33.72	19.85	26.11
5 wickets in innings	1	1	0	39
10 wickets in match	0	0	0	11
Best bowling	5/82	5/42	3/20	9/62
Catches/stumpings	1/0	7/0	0/0	87/0
- Source: ESPNcricinfo, 24 March 2017

Hewa Kaluhalamullage Suraj Randiv Kaluhalamulla (born 30 January 1985), formerly Mohamed Marshuk Mohamed Suraj, known popularly as Suraj Randiv, is a former professional Sri Lankan cricketer, who played all formats of the game. He plays first-class cricket for Sinhalese Sports Club. Suraj was educated at Rahula College Matara. He is now working as a bus driver, as well as serving the role of captain-coach at Edinburgh Cricket Club.

== Early career ==
A right arm offspinner, Suraj had a successful under-age career in Sri Lanka. He represented his country at under-15 and under-19 level and took 23 wickets in four matches at an Under-23 tournament of 2003–04. This effort caught the attention of Marvan Atapattu, who was influential in getting him over to Sinhalese Sports Club. He went on play for Sri Lanka A and Sri Lanka.

Suraj Randiv converted from Islam to Buddhism.

== International career ==
In December 2009, he replaced Muttiah Muralitharan in Sri Lanka's ODI squad in India and he made his debut in the second match of the series in Nagpur. He impressed by taking three wickets for 51 runs; Sri Lanka went on to win the match by three wickets.

On 16 August 2010, in an incident that drew considerable media attention, Randiv intentionally bowled a no-ball—overstepping the bowling mark by a significant margin—to Virender Sehwag—then on 99—that ensured a victory for India in the ODI which was part of tri-series, while denying Sehwag a chance to score a century. Sehwag hit the ball for six but as the winning run was registered as soon as the umpire signalled no-ball, Sehwag's shot was deemed to have been made after the end of the match. Randiv later apologised to Sehwag for use of the tactic; he was docked his match fees for the game and handed a one match suspension by Sri Lanka Cricket. It was revealed that fellow mate Tillekaratne Dilshan advised and urged Randiv to bowl no-ball at Sehwag.

He was omitted from Sri Lanka's squad for the 2011 Cricket World Cup, but was called up as a replacement for the injured Angelo Mathews, and was subsequently picked for the World Cup Final.

After 5 years of long period, Randiv was selected for England tour in 2016, where he played in the second ODI on 24 June 2016.

== Domestic career ==
Randiv was picked up by the Chennai Super Kings at the 2011 IPL player auction and played for the Chennai Super Kings for two seasons. He was released in 2012 before the start of IPL 5. In 2016, he played for Coleraine Cricket Club in Northern Ireland as their designated professional cricketer.

After migrating to Australia, he went onto play at district level competitions in Australia. He plays for Dandenong Cricket Club which is affiliated with Victoria Premier Cricket. In December 2020, he was invited by the Cricket Australia for a temporary role as a net bowler to bowl at the Australian cricketers in the nets ahead of their home test series against India (Border-Gavaskar Trophy).

== Post cricket ==
Randiv pursued his later career as a bus driver, working for France-based international public transport agency Transdev in Melbourne, Australia.
