= Mahela Udawatte =

Sri Lankan cricketer (born 1986)

Personal information
- Full name: Mahela Lakmal Udawtte
- Born: 19 July 1986 (age 40); Colombo, Sri Lanka
- Height: 5 ft 8 in (1.73 m)
- Batting: Left-handed
- Bowling: Right-arm off-spin
- Role: Middle-order Batsman

International information
- National side: Sri Lanka (2008–2018)
- Test debut (cap 147): 14 June 2018 v West Indies
- Last Test: 23 June 2018 v West Indies
- ODI debut (cap 135): 10 April 2008 v West Indies
- Last ODI: 28 November 2008 v Zimbabwe
- ODI shirt no.: 59
- T20I debut (cap 24): 10 October 2008 v Zimbabwe
- Last T20I: 29 October 2017 v Pakistan

Domestic team information
- Years: Team
- 2005–: Chilaw Marians Cricket Club
- 2007–: Wayamba

Career statistics
Competition	Test	ODI	T20I
Matches	2	9	8
Runs scored	23	257	96
Batting average	5.75	28.55	12.00
100s/50s	0/0	0/2	0/0
Top score	19	73	25
Catches/stumpings	2/–	0/–	0/–
- Source: Cricinfo, 23 June 2018

Mahela Lakmal Udawatte known as Mahela Udawatte (Sinhala: මහේල උඩවත්ත; born 19 July 1986) is a professional Sri Lankan International cricketer. He played as an opening batsman in his debut series in 2008, and shifted to become a middle order batsman for his comeback in 2017. He played his first Test match against the West Indies in 2018, 10 years after his limited overs debut.

== Domestic career ==
Straight after he left school, he joined Chilaw Marians SC and Promoted to open the batting. He has also played for Kings of Khulna in Bangladesh's NCL T20 Bangladesh.

He usually opens the batting and made his first class debut in 2004–05 in Sri Lanka and he was also named in the thirty-man provisional squad for the 2007 World Cup but failed to make it to the final fifteen.

His average in first class cricket may not be that great, but it his hard hitting capabilities that have left many an expert rooting for him. Udawatte plays first class cricket for the Chilaw Marians Cricket Club. He had also scored three centuries in only five matches in domestic competitions.

In March 2018, he was named in Kandy's squad for the 2017–18 Super Four Provincial Tournament. The following month, he was also named in Kandy's squad for the 2018 Super Provincial One Day Tournament. He was the leading run-scorer for Kandy in the tournament, with 187 runs in three matches.

In August 2018, he was named in Colombo's squad the 2018 SLC T20 League. In March 2019, he was named in Galle's squad for the 2019 Super Provincial One Day Tournament. In August 2021, he was named in the SLC Greens team for the 2021 SLC Invitational T20 League tournament.

== International career ==
He was chosen for the Sri Lanka ODI squad for their tour of West Indies in April 2008 and played in all three ODIs. With only two fifties in 9 ODIs as an opener, Udawatte was dropped from the squad in late 2009. After 9 years, he was recalled into the T20I squad for the 3-match series against Pakistan due to unavailability of many permanent players avoid to travel Pakistan for the third T20I at Lahore. However, he scored poorly in all three matches.

In May 2018, he was named in Sri Lanka's Test squad for their series against the West Indies. He made his Test debut for Sri Lanka against the West Indies on 14 June 2018. He became the oldest Sri Lankan to debut opening in Test cricket at the age of 31. However, he got out for nought in the first innings.
