= 2012 Sri Lanka Premier League draft =

The player draft for the 2012 Sri Lanka Premier League was held on 5 July 2012 for international players and on 6 July for local players. 56 international players were drafted and comprised mostly Australian and Pakistani players. 107 local players were drafted.

== Drafted local players ==
| Player | Team | Price (USD) |
|---|---|---|
| Chamara Kapugedera | Uthura Rudras | 35,000 |
| Jehan Mubarak | Uthura Rudras | 20,000 |
| Farveez Maharoof | Uthura Rudras | 25,000 |
| Janaka Gunaratne | Uthura Rudras | 15,000 |
| Nilanka Premaratne | Uthura Rudras | 15,000 |
| Mahela Udawatte | Uthura Rudras | 20,000 |
| Chathura Peiris | Uthura Rudras | 5,000 |
| Akalanka Ganegama | Uthura Rudras | 7,000 |
| Roshen Silva | Uthura Rudras | 15,000 |
| PHD Kaushalya | Uthura Rudras | 5,000 |
| Sandun Weerakkody | Uthura Rudras | 5,000 |
| Madra Lakmal | Uthura Rudras | 7,000 |
| Sohan Boralessa | Uthura Rudras | 15,000 |
| Yohan de Silva | Uthura Rudras | 15,000 |
| Madushanka Ekanayake | Uthura Rudras | 7,000 |
| Nuwan Kulasekara | Nagenahira Nagas | 35,000 |
| Angelo Perera | Nagenahira Nagas | 15,000 |
| Ajantha Mendis | Nagenahira Nagas | 25,000 |
| Tillakaratne Sampath | Nagenahira Nagas | 15,000 |
| Sachith Pathirana | Nagenahira Nagas | 7,000 |
| Suraj Randiv | Nagenahira Nagas | 25,000 |
| Gayan Maneeshan | Nagenahira Nagas | 5,000 |
| Dushmantha Chameera | Nagenahira Nagas | 5,000 |
| Shaminda Eranga | Nagenahira Nagas | 20,000 |
| Udara Jayasundera | Nagenahira Nagas | 5,000 |
| Kanishka Alvitigala | Nagenahira Nagas | 15,000 |
| Sajeewa Weerakoon | Nagenahira Nagas | 15,000 |
| Andy Solomons | Nagenahira Nagas | 7,000 |
| Ishan Jayaratne | Nagenahira Nagas | 7,000 |
| Charith Sylvester | Nagenahira Nagas | 7,000 |
| Angelo Mathews | Nagenahira Nagas | – (Icon player) |
| Lahiru Thirimanne | Ruhuna Royals | 25,000 |
| Chamara Silva | Ruhuna Royals | 25,000 |
| Prasanna Jayawardene | Ruhuna Royals | 25,000 |
| Dilruwan Perera | Ruhuna Royals | 20,000 |
| Ramith Rambukwella | Ruhuna Royals | 5,000 |
| Tharanga Lakshitha | Ruhuna Royals | 15,000 |
| Gihan Rupasinghe | Ruhuna Royals | 7,000 |
| Shalika Karunanayake | Ruhuna Royals | 7,000 |
| Denuwan Rajakaruna | Ruhuna Royals | 7,000 |
| Malinga Bandara | Ruhuna Royals | 15,000 |
| Kasun Madushanka | Ruhuna Royals | 5,000 |
| Dhananjaya de Silva | Ruhuna Royals | 5,000 |
| Shanuka Dissanayake | Ruhuna Royals | 7,000 |
| Gayan Wijekoon | Ruhuna Royals | 7,000 |
| Chaminda Vidanapathirana | Ruhuna Royals | 7,000 |
| Dinesh Chandimal | Wayamba United | 35,000 |
| Isuru Udana | Wayamba United | 20,000 |
| Kushal Janith Perera | Wayamba United | 15,000 |
| Akila Dananjaya | Wayamba United | 5,000 |
| Kaushalya Weeraratne | Wayamba United | 7,000 |
| Shehan Jayasuriya | Wayamba United | 5,000 |
| Suranga Lakmal | Wayamba United | 25,000 |
| Milinda Siriwardana | Wayamba United | 15,000 |
| Chathuraga Kumara | Wayamba United | 7,000 |
| Nimesh Perera | Wayamba United | 7,000 |
| Chaminda Vaas | Wayamba United | 25,000 |
| Alankara Asanka | Wayamba United | 7,000 |
| Dasun Shanaka | Wayamba United | 5,000 |
| Malinga Pushpakumara | Wayamba United | 15,000 |
| Dilesh Gunaratne | Wayamba United | 7,000 |
| Thisara Perera | Kandurata Warriors | 35,000 |
| Thilan Samaraweera | Kandurata Warriors | 25,000 |
| Kosala Kulasekara | Kandurata Warriors | 20,000 |
| Kithruwan Vithanage | Kandurata Warriors | 5,000 |
| Kaushal Lokuarachchi | Kandurata Warriors | 20,000 |
| Jeevantha Kulatunga | Kandurata Warriors | 7,000 |
| Malinda Warnapura | Kandurata Warriors | 15,000 |
| Chanaka Welegedara | Kandurata Warriors | 25,000 |
| Sanath Jayasuriya | Kandurata Warriors | 35,000 |
| Dilhara Lokuhettige | Kandurata Warriors | 7,000 |
| Tharanga Paranavitana | Kandurata Warriors | 25,000 |
| Rumesh Buddika | Kandurata Warriors | 5,000 |
| Rubaraj Janoch | Kandurata Warriors | 7,000 |
| Kaushal Silva | Kandurata Warriors | 20,000 |
| Niroshan Dickwella | Kandurata Warriors | 5,000 |
| Jeevan Mendis | Basnahira Cricket Dundee | 20,000 |
| Rangana Herath | Basnahira Cricket Dundee | 35,000 |
| Indika de Saram | Basnahira Cricket Dundee | 7,000 |
| Danushka Gunathilaka | Basnahira Cricket Dundee | 5,000 |
| Dhammika Prasad | Basnahira Cricket Dundee | 20,000 |
| Lahiru Jayaratne | Basnahira Cricket Dundee | 5,000 |
| Rushan Jaleel | Basnahira Cricket Dundee | 5,000 |
| Sachithra Serasinghe | Basnahira Cricket Dundee | 15,000 |
| Nuwan Pradeep | Basnahira Cricket Dundee | 20,000 |
| Dimuth Karunaratne | Basnahira Cricket Dundee | 20,000 |
| Amal Athulamudali | Basnahira Cricket Dundee | 7,000 |
| Sanjaya Gangodawila | Basnahira Cricket Dundee | 7,000 |
| Nadeehra Nawala | Basnahira Cricket Dundee | 15,000 |
| Thilan Thushara | Basnahira Cricket Dundee | 15,000 |
| Ishara Amerasinghe | Basnahira Cricket Dundee | 7,000 |
| Sachithra Senanayake | Uva Next | 20,000 |
| Thilina Kandamby | Uva Next | 25,000 |
| Upul Tharanga | Uva Next | 25,000 |
| Dilshan Munaweera | Uva Next | 15,000 |
| Dilhara Fernando | Uva Next | 25,000 |
| Bhanuka Rajapaksa | Uva Next | 5,000 |
| Chinthaka Jayasinghe | Uva Next | 7,000 |
| Sameera Zoysa | Uva Next | 7,000 |
| Seekkuge Prasanna | Uva Next | 20,000 |
| Ashan Priyanjan | Uva Next | 15,000 |
| Vishwa Fernando | Uva Next | 5,000 |
| Lahiru Madushanka | Uva Next | 5,000 |
| Akila Ishanka | Uva Next | 7,000 |
| Dinesh Darshapriya | Uva Next | 7,000 |
| Saliya Saman | Uva Next | 7,000 |
| Ashen Silva | Uva Next | 15,000 |

== Drafted international players ==
| Player | Team | Price (USD) |
|---|---|---|
| (Bangladesh) Shakib Al Hasan | Uthura Rudras | 25,000 |
| (Zimbabwe) Brendan Taylor | Uthura Rudras | 10,000 |
| (Trinidad and Tobago) Kevon Cooper | Uthura Rudras | 15,000 |
| (Pakistan) Imran Farhat | Uthura Rudras | 20,000 |
| (Barbados) Fidel Edwards | Uthura Rudras | 20,000 |
| (South Africa) David Miller | Uthura Rudras | 25,000 |
| (South Africa) Dillon du Preez | Uthura Rudras | 20,000 |
| (Trinidad and Tobago) Samuel Badree | Uthura Rudras | 20,000 |
| (Australia) Mitchell Marsh | Nagenahira Nagas | 30,000 |
| (Pakistan) Imran Nazir | Nagenahira Nagas | 20,000 |
| (Australia) Travis Birt | Nagenahira Nagas | 25,000 |
| (Pakistan) Ahmed Shehzad | Nagenahira Nagas | 20,000 |
| (Australia) Ben Laughlin | Nagenahira Nagas | 20,000 |
| (Bangladesh) Elias Sunny | Nagenahira Nagas | 12,000 |
| (Bangladesh) Mushfiqur Rahim | Nagenahira Nagas | 20,000 |
| (Bangladesh) Nasir Hossain | Nagenahira Nagas | 16,000 |
| (Pakistan) Shahid Afridi | Ruhuna Royals | 50,000 |
| (Australia) Daniel Harris | Ruhuna Royals | 30,000 |
| (Australia) Ryan Harris | Ruhuna Royals | 30,000 |
| (Australia) Aaron Finch | Ruhuna Royals | 30,000 |
| (Jamaica) Jerome Taylor | Ruhuna Royals | 20,000 |
| (New Zealand) Nathan McCullum | Ruhuna Royals | 25,000 |
| (South Africa) Ryan McLaren | Ruhuna Royals | 15,000 |
| (South Africa) Richard Levi | Ruhuna Royals | 25,000 |
| (Pakistan) Azhar Mahmood | Wayamba United | 30,000 |
| (Pakistan) Umar Akmal | Wayamba United | 25,000 |
| (Bangladesh) Tamim Iqbal | Wayamba United | 18,000 |
| (South Africa) Colin Ingram | Wayamba United | 20,000 |
| (Barbados) Kemar Roach | Wayamba United | 25,000 |
| (Australia) James Faulkner | Wayamba United | 25,000 |
| (Pakistan) Abdul Razzaq | Wayamba United | 25,000 |
| (Australia) Brad Hogg | Wayamba United | 25,000 |
| (Pakistan) Saeed Ajmal | Kandurata Warriors | 25,000 |
| (Pakistan) Misbah-ul-Haq | Kandurata Warriors | 25,000 |
| (Pakistan) Sohail Tanvir | Kandurata Warriors | 20,000 |
| (Australia) Chris Lynn | Kandurata Warriors | 20,000 |
| (South Africa) Dane Vilas | Kandurata Warriors | 10,000 |
| (South Africa) Albie Morkel | Kandurata Warriors | 35,000 |
| (South Africa) Johan Botha | Kandurata Warriors | 25,000 |
| (Australia) Adam Voges | Kandurata Warriors | 25,000 |
| (Australia) Brad Hodge | Basnahira Cricket Dundee | 30,000 |
| (Jamaica) Marlon Samuels | Basnahira Cricket Dundee | 30,000 |
| (Australia) Daniel Smith | Basnahira Cricket Dundee | 20,000 |
| (Australia) Dirk Nannes | Basnahira Cricket Dundee | 35,000 |
| (South Africa) Robin Peterson | Basnahira Cricket Dundee | 20,000 |
| (New Zealand) Tim Southee | Basnahira Cricket Dundee | 25,000 |
| (Australia) Clint McKay | Basnahira Cricket Dundee | 25,000 |
| (Australia) Cameron Borgas | Basnahira Cricket Dundee | 20,000 |
| (Australia) Andrew McDonald | Uva Next | 35,000 |
| (Pakistan) Umar Gul | Uva Next | 25,000 |
| (Pakistan) Shoaib Malik | Uva Next | 35,000 |
| (Australia) Callum Ferguson | Uva Next | 30,000 |
| (New Zealand) James Franklin | Uva Next | 30,000 |
| (Pakistan) Abdur Rehman | Uva Next | 20,000 |
| (Pakistan) Hammad Azam | Uva Next | 15,000 |
| (Jamaica) Chris Gayle | Uva Next | 100,000 |
