= 2012 Sri Lanka Premier League =

- Administrator: Sri Lanka Cricket
- Cricket format: Twenty20
- Tournament format(s): Round-robin and knockout
- Host: Sri Lanka
- Champions: Uva Next (1st title)
- Participants: 7
- Matches: 24
- Player of the series: Shaminda Eranga (Nagenahira)
- Most runs: Dilshan Munaweera (Uva) [212]
- Most wickets: Jacob Oram (Uva) [15]
- Official website: www.slpl.lk

The 2012 Sri Lanka Premier League season was the debut edition of the Sri Lanka Premier League, established by Sri Lanka Cricket in 2011. The season ran from 11 to 31 August 2012. The tournament was originally scheduled to begin in 2011 but it was postponed to 2012, with the former Inter-Provincial Twenty20 taking its place.

== Format ==
The tournament had a group stage and a knockout stage. The seven teams played in a single round-robin tournament in the group stage and the top four teams qualified for the semi-finals. The winners of the semi-finals played in the final.

== Venues ==
All of the matches in the tournament were played at Pallekele International Cricket Stadium, Kandy and R Premadasa Stadium, Colombo.

Venue	Colombo	Kandy
Stadium	R Premadasa Stadium	Pallekele International Cricket Stadium
Established	1986	2008
Capacity	35,000	35,000
Floodlights	Yes	Yes
Venues for the tournament		

== Player draft ==
The draft was held on 5 July 2012 for international players and on 6 July for local players. 56 international players were drafted and comprised mostly Australian and Pakistani players. 107 local players were drafted.

== Opening ceremony ==
The opening ceremony was held on 10 August 2012 at the Sugathadasa Stadium in Colombo.

== Teams and standings ==
Pos	Team	Pld	W	L	T	NR	Pts	NRR
1	Wayamba United	6	5	1	0	0	10	1.371
2	Nagenahira Nagas	6	4	2	0	0	8	−0.353
3	Kandurata Warriors	6	3	2	0	1	7	0.420
4	Uva Next	6	3	2	0	1	7	0.082
5	Ruhuna Royals	6	2	4	0	0	4	−0.143
6	Uthura Rudras	6	2	4	0	0	4	−0.527
7	Basnahira Cricket Dundee	6	1	5	0	0	2	−0.885

Source: Points table on ESPN CricInfo

Note: Top four teams qualify for the semi-finals.

== League progression ==
	Group matches						Knockout	
Team	1	2	3	4	5	6	SF	F
Basnahira Cricket Dundee	2	2	2	2	2	2		
Kandurata Warriors	0	0	2	4	6	7	NR	
Nagenahira Nagas	2	4	6	6	6	8	NR	L
Ruhuna Royals	0	2	2	2	4	4		
Uthura Rudras	0	0	0	0	2	4		
Uva Next	2	2	4	6	7	7	W	W
Wayamba United	2	4	6	8	8	10	L	

Win	Loss	No result
Team was eliminated in group stage

Note: The total points at the end of each group match are listed.
Note: Click on the points (group matches) or W/L (knockout) to see the summary for the match.

== Fixtures ==
All match times in Sri Lanka Standard Time (UTC+05:30)

=== Group stage ===
11 August
16:00 (D/N)
Scorecard

Ruhuna Royals; 134 (20 overs)	v	Nagenahira Nagas; 77/2 (12 overs)
Lahiru Thirimanne 34 (33); Shaminda Eranga 3/15 (4 overs)		Travis Birt 33* (38); Lasith Malinga 1/4 (2 overs)

Nagenahira won by 5 runs (D/L)
R. Premadasa Stadium, Colombo
Umpires: Ruchira Palliyaguruge(SL) and Sundaram Ravi(Ind)
Player of the match: Shaminda Eranga (Nagenahira Nagas)

- Ruhuna Royals won the toss and elected to bat.
- Rain stopped play after 12 overs in the Nagenahira Nagas' innings. Their target would have been 73 runs from 12 overs according to the Duckworth–Lewis method.

11 August
20:00 (D/N)
Scorecard

Basnahira Cricket Dundee; 129/3 (13 overs)	v	Kandurata Warriors; 95/7 (13 overs)
Tillakaratne Dilshan 66* (39); Sohail Tanvir 3/31 (3 overs)		Thisara Perera 35 (21); Tillakaratne Dilshan 2/26 (3 overs)

Basnahira won by 34 runs
R. Premadasa Stadium, Colombo
Umpires: Raveendra Wimalasiri(SL)and Tyron Wijewardene(SL)
Player of the match: Tillakaratne Dilshan (Basnahira Cricket Dundee)

- Kandurata Warriors won the toss and elected to field.

12 August
16:00 (D/N)
Scorecard

Uthura Rudras; 179/7 (20 overs)	v	Wayamba United; 183/1 (19.2 overs)
Imran Farhat 51 (22); Isuru Udana 2/38 (4 overs)		Tamim Iqbal 93* (61); Kevon Cooper 1/26 (4 overs)

Wayamba won by 9 wickets
R. Premadasa Stadium, Colombo
Umpires: Asoka de Silva and Sena Nandiweera
Player of the match: Tamim Iqbal (Wayamba United)

- Wayamba United won the toss and elected to field.

12 August
20:00 (D/N)
Scorecard

Basnahira Cricket Dundee; 136/9 (20 overs)	v	Uva Next; 139/2 (18.2 overs)
Tillakaratne Dilshan 56 (48); Dilhara Fernando 5/17 (3 overs)		Upul Tharanga 65* (53); Rangana Herath 1/17 (4 overs)

Uva won by 8 wickets
R. Premadasa Stadium, Colombo
Umpires: Nishan Dhanasinghe and Ruchira Palliyaguruge
Player of the match: Dilhara Fernando (Uva Next)

- Basnahira Cricket Dundee won the toss and elected to bat.

13 August
20:00 (D/N)
Scorecard

Kandurata Warriors; 159/7 (20 overs)	v	Nagenahira Nagas; 160/3 (19.3 overs)
Thisara Perera 72 (33); Ben Laughlin 2/29 (4 overs)		Imran Nazir 58 (32); Kaushal Lokuarachchi 2/23 (4 overs)

Nagenahira won by 7 wickets
R. Premadasa Stadium, Colombo
Umpires: Tyron Wijewardene and Maurice Zilwa
Player of the match: Imran Nazir (Nagenahira Nagas)

- Kandurata Warriors won the toss and elected to bat.

14 August
20:00 (D/N)
Scorecard

Ruhuna Royals; 145/3 (16 overs)	v	Uthura Rudras; 118 (15.5 overs)
Aaron Finch 65 (48); Jehan Mubarak 1/15 (2 overs)		Farveez Maharoof 32 (17); Lasith Malinga 4/21 (4 overs)

Ruhuna won by 35 runs (D/L)
R. Premadasa Stadium, Colombo
Umpires: Asoka de Silva and Rohitha Kottahachchi
Player of the match: Lasith Malinga (Ruhuna Royals)

- Uthura Rudras won the toss and elected to field.
- Rain reduced the match to 16 overs per side and revised the Uthura Rudras' target to 154 runs from 16 overs according to the Duckworth–Lewis method.

17 August
16:00 (D/N)
Scorecard

Wayamba United; 147/9 (20 overs)	v	Uva Next; 127 (18.1 overs)
Kamran Akmal 36 (32); Jacob Oram 3/6 (4 overs)		Dilshan Munaweera 26 (19); Chathuranga Kumara 3/33 (4 overs)

Wayamba won by 20 runs
Pallekele International Cricket Stadium
Umpires: Asoka de Silva and Ruchira Palliyaguruge
Player of the match: Chathuranga Kumara (Wayamba United)

- Uva Next won the toss and elected to field.

17 August
20:00 (D/N)
Scorecard

Basnahira Cricket Dundee; 146 (20 overs)	v	Nagenahira Nagas; 151/4 (19 overs)
Tillakaratne Dilshan 35 (31); Shaminda Eranga 3/20 (4 overs)		Mushfiqur Rahim 54* (39); Dirk Nannes 3/34 (4 overs)

Nagenahira won by 6 wickets
Pallekele International Cricket Stadium
Umpires: Asoka de Silva and Tyron Wijewardene
Player of the match: Shaminda Eranga (Nagenahira Nagas)

- Nagenahira Nagas won the toss and elected to field.

18 August
16:00 (D/N)
Scorecard

Kandurata Warriors; 168/5 (20 overs)	v	Uthura Rudras; 105/7 (16 overs)
Thilan Samaraweera 71 (45); Farveez Maharoof 3/36 (4 overs)		Dillon du Preez 19* (13); Sohail Tanvir 4/32 (4 overs)

Kandurata won by 32 runs (D/L)
Pallekele International Cricket Stadium
Umpires: Ruchira Palliyaguruge and Tyron Wijewardene
Player of the match: Thilan Samaraweera (Kandurata Warriors)

- Kandurata Warriors won the toss and elected to bat.
- Rain revised the Uthura Rudras' target to 138 runs from 16 overs according to the Duckworth–Lewis method.

19 August
16:00 (D/N)
Scorecard

Wayamba United; 165/9 (20 overs)	v	Basnahira Cricket Dundee; 98 (19.1 overs)
Kamran Akmal 65 (46); Charl Langeveldt 3/36 (4 overs)		Rilee Rossouw 20 (16); Kaushalya Weeraratne 3/11 (3.1 overs)

Wayamba won by 67 runs
Pallekele International Cricket Stadium
Umpires: Asoka de Silva and Ruchira Palliyaguruge
Player of the match: Kamran Akmal (Wayamba United)

- Wayamba United won the toss and elected to bat.

19 August
20:00 (D/N)
Scorecard

Uthura Rudras; 124/8 (20 overs)	v	Uva Next; 126/6 (19.1 overs)
Janaka Gunaratne 30* (17); Sachithra Senanayake 3/16 (4 overs)		Dilshan Munaweera 36 (25); Chathura Peiris 2/24 (4 overs)

Uva won by 4 wickets
Pallekele International Cricket Stadium
Umpires: Asoka de Silva and Tyron Wijewardene
Player of the match: Sachithra Senanayake (Uva Next)

- Uthura Rudras won the toss and elected to bat.

20 August
16:00 (D/N)
Scorecard

Kandurata Warriors; 142 (19.2 overs)	v	Ruhuna Royals; 100 (17.2 overs)
Kithuruwan Vithanage 31 (27); Dilruwan Perera 3/21 (4 overs)		Shahid Afridi 36 (16); Sohail Tanvir 3/4 (3.2 overs)

Kandurata won by 42 runs
Pallekele International Cricket Stadium
Umpires: Ruchira Palliyaguruge and Tyron Wijewardene
Player of the match: Kithuruwan Vithanage (Kandurata Warriors)

- Kandurata Warriors won the toss and elected to bat.

20 August
20:00 (D/N)
Scorecard

Wayamba United; 190/4 (20 overs)	v	Nagenahira Nagas; 134 (19.5 overs)
Mahela Jayawardene 96* (50); Ajantha Mendis 2/29 (4 overs)		Angelo Perera 48* (39); Akila Dananjaya 3/18 (4 overs)

Wayamba won by 56 runs
Pallekele International Cricket Stadium
Umpires: Asoka de Silva and Ruchira Palliyaguruge
Player of the match: Mahela Jayawardene (Wayamba United)

- Wayamba United won the toss and elected to bat.

21 August
16:00 (D/N)
Scorecard

Uva Next; 155/6 (20 overs)	v	Ruhuna Royals; 141/9 (20 overs)
Upul Tharanga 48 (40); Wahab Riaz 3/34 (4 overs)		Wahab Riaz 31* (18); Seekkuge Prasanna 4/19 (4 overs)

Uva won by 14 runs
Pallekele International Cricket Stadium
Umpires: Asoka de Silva and Tyron Wijewardene
Player of the match: Seekkuge Prasanna (Uva Next)

- Uva Next won the toss and elected to bat.

21 August
20:00 (D/N)
Scorecard

Basnahira Cricket Dundee; 150/6 (20 overs)	v	Uthura Rudras; 156/6 (19.2 overs)
Rilee Rossouw 44 (37); Madushanka Ekanayake 2/35 (4 overs)		Chamara Kapugedera 69* (42); Thilan Thushara 2/40 (4 overs)

Uthura won by 4 wickets
Pallekele International Cricket Stadium
Umpires: Ruchira Palliyaguruge and Tyron Wijewardene
Player of the match: Chamara Kapugedera (Uthura Rudras)

- Basnahira Cricket Dundee won the toss and elected to bat.

24 August
20:00 (D/N)
Scorecard

Kandurata Warriors; 149/8 (20 overs)	v	Wayamba United; 147/6 (20 overs)
Chris Lynn 80 (51); Mohammad Hafeez 2/14 (4 overs)		Abdul Razzaq 36* (18); Kaushal Lokuarachchi 3/15 (3 overs)

Kandurata won by 2 runs
R. Premadasa Stadium, Colombo
Umpires: Ravindra Kottahachchi and Tyron Wijewardene
Player of the match: Chris Lynn (Kandurata Warriors)

- Kandurata Warriors won the toss and elected to bat.

25 August
16:00 (D/N)
Scorecard

Basnahira Cricket Dundee; 123/4 (20 overs)	v	Ruhuna Royals; 124/6 (16.4 overs)
Cameron Borgas 40 (33); Wahab Riaz 2/19 (4 overs)		Nasir Jamshed 51* (46); Mahmudullah 3/30 (4 overs)

Ruhuna won by 4 wickets
R. Premadasa Stadium, Colombo
Umpires: Ruchira Palliyaguruge and Raveendra Wimalasiri
Player of the match: Nasir Jamshed (Ruhuna Royals)

- Basnahira Cricket Dundee won the toss and elected to bat.

25 August
20:00 (D/N)
Scorecard

Kandurata Warriors	v	Uva Next

Match abandoned without a ball bowled
R. Premadasa Stadium, Colombo
Umpires: Asoka de Silva and Sagara Gallage

26 August
14:00 (D/N)
Scorecard

Uthura Rudras; 149/6 (20 overs)	v	Nagenahira Nagas; 134/9 (20 overs)
Chamara Kapugedera 43 (32); Shaminda Eranga 2/32 (4 overs)		Colin de Grandhomme 43 (28); Rana Naved-ul-Hasan 3/21 (4 overs)

Uthura won by 15 runs
R. Premadasa Stadium, Colombo
Umpires: Sena Nandiweera and Ruchira Palliyaguruge
Player of the match: Rana Naved-ul-Hasan (Uthura Rudras)

- Uthura Rudras won the toss and elected to bat.

26 August
20:00 (D/N)
Scorecard

Wayamba United; 162/7 (20 overs)	v	Ruhuna Royals; 148/9 (20 overs)
Dinesh Chandimal 75 (54); Dilruwan Perera 2/32 (4 overs)		Lahiru Thirimanne 40* (34); Chathuranga Kumara 2/17 (4 overs)

Wayamba won by 14 runs
R. Premadasa Stadium, Colombo
Umpires: Nishan Dhanasinghe and Tyron Wijewardene
Player of the match: Dinesh Chandimal (Wayamba United)

- Wayamba United won the toss and elected to bat.

27 August
20:00 (D/N)
Scorecard

Uva Next; 160/7 (20 overs)	v	Nagenahira Nagas; 163/4 (19.1 overs)
Dilshan Munaweera 45 (35); Shaminda Eranga 2/25 (4 overs)		Imran Nazir 44 (25); Charith Jayampathi 2/37 (4 overs)

Nagenahira won by 6 wickets
R. Premadasa Stadium, Colombo
Umpires: Asoka de Silva and Maurice Zilwa
Player of the match: Imran Nazir (Nagenahira Nagas)

- Uva Next won the toss and elected to bat.

=== Knockout stage ===
Semifinals
1	Wayamba United	151/6 (20 overs)
4	Uva Next	171/6 (20 overs)
2	Nagenahira Nagas	No result
3	Kandurata Warriors	Bye

Final
4	Uva Next (D/L)	63/1 (5.1 overs)
2	Nagenahira Nagas	134/4 (15 overs)

==== Semi-finals ====
28 August
20:00 (D/N)
Scorecard

Uva Next; 171/6 (20 overs)	v	Wayamba United; 151/8 (20 overs)
Shivnarine Chanderpaul 50* (41); Abdul Razzaq 2/17 (4 overs)		Azhar Mahmood 75* (47); Jacob Oram 3/16 (4 overs)

Uva won by 20 runs
R. Premadasa Stadium, Colombo
Umpires: Asoka De Silva and Tyron Wijewardene
Player of the match: Jacob Oram (Uva)

- Uva Next won the toss and elected to bat

29 August
20:00 (D/N)
Scorecard

Nagenahira Nagas	v	Kandurata Warriors

Match abandoned without a ball bowled
R. Premadasa Stadium, Colombo
Umpires: Sagara Gallage and Ruchira Palliyaguruge

- Nagenahira Nagas advanced to the final as the higher seed.

==== Final ====
31 August
20:00 (D/N)
Scorecard

Nagenahira Nagas; 134/4 (15 overs)	v	Uva Next; 63/1 (5.1 overs)
Angelo Mathews 73* (27); Andrew McDonald 2/24 (3 overs)		Dilshan Munaweera 44 (23); Ajantha Mendis 1/25 (2 overs)

Uva won by 19 runs (D/L)
R. Premadasa Stadium, Colombo
Umpires: Asoka de Silva and Ruchira Palliyaguruge
Player of the match: Dilshan Munaweera (Uva)

- Nagenahira Nagas won the toss and elected to bat.
- Rain first reduced the match to 15 overs per side. Rain stopped play after 5.1 overs in Uva Next's innings. Their target would have been 45 runs according to the Duckworth–Lewis method.

== Statistics ==
Most runs
Runs	Player	Team
212	Dilshan Munaweera	Uva Next
211	Angelo Mathews	Nagenahira Nagas
203	Kamran Akmal	Wayamba United
195	Tillakaratne Dilshan	Basnahira Cricket Dundee
190	Tamim Iqbal	Wayamba United

Most wickets
Wickets	Player	Team
11	Jacob Oram	Uva Next
11	Sohail Tanvir	Kandurata Warriors
11	Shaminda Eranga	Nagenahira Nagas
11	Isuru Udana	Wayamba United
11	Ajantha Mendis	Nagenahira Nagas

=== Awards ===
Player	Team	Award	Value
Akila Dananjaya	Wayamba United	Young Player of the Tournament	
Shaminda Eranga	Nagenahira Nagas	Player of the Tournament	Mahindra XUV500
