= List of Sri Lanka Premier League records and statistics =

This is a list of statistics and records of the Sri Lanka Premier League, a Twenty20 cricket competition based in Sri Lanka. The statistics and records included in this article take into account only those matches where two SLPL teams were playing against each other as part of an SLPL season. They do not include the results of trial games, exhibition matches, or games played in other tournaments such as the Champions League Twenty20.

== Team records ==
=== Result summary ===
Team	Span	Titles	Matches	won	Loss	NR	Win%	Best	Worst !
Uva Next	2012	1	8	5	2	1	62.5	Champions	
Wayamba United	2012	0	7	5	2	0	71.4	Semi-Finals	
Ruhuna Royals	2012	0	6	2	4	0	33.3	5th of 7	
Uthura Rudras	2012	0	6	2	4	0	33.3	6th of 7	
Basnahira Cricket Dundee	2012	0	6	1	5	0	16.6	7th of 7	
Nagenahira Nagas	2012	0	8	4	3	1	62.5	Runners-up	
Kandurata Warriors	2012	0	7	3	3	1	42.8	Semi-Finals	

=== Highest totals ===
Score	Team	Opponent	Ov	RR	Inns	Season	Ground	Scorecard
190 / 4	Wayamba United	Nagenahira Nagas	20.0	9.50	1	2012	Kandy – Pallekele International Cricket Stadium	
183 / 1	Wayamba United	Uthura Rudras	19.2	9.46	2	2012	Colombo – R. Premadasa Stadium	
179 / 7	Uthura Rudras	Wayamba United	20.0	8.95	1	2012	Colombo – R. Premadasa Stadium	
171 / 6	Uva Next	Wayamba United	20.0	8.55	1	2012	Colombo – R. Premadasa Stadium	
168 / 5	Kandurata Warriors	Uthura Rudras	20.0	8.40	1	2012	Kandy – Pallekele International Cricket Stadium	

=== Lowest totals ===
Score	Team	Opponent	Ov	RR	Inns	Season	Ground	Scorecard
77	Nagenahira Nagas	Ruhuna Royals	12	6.41	2	2012	Colombo – R. Premadasa Stadium	
95 / 7	Kandurata Warriors	Basnahira Cricket Dundee	13	7.30	2	2012	Colombo – R. Premadasa Stadium	
98	Basnahira Cricket Dundee	Wayamba United	19.1	5.11	2	2012	Kandy – Pallekele International Cricket Stadium	

=== Highest match aggregates ===
Score	Winner	Loser	Ov	RR	Wkts	Season	Ground	Scorecard
362	Wayamba United	Uthura Rudras	39.2	9.20	8	2012	Colombo – R. Premadasa Stadium	
324	Wayamba United	Nagenahira Nagas	39.5	8.13	14	2012	Kandy – Pallekele International Cricket Stadium	
323	Nagenahira Nagas	Uva Next	39.1	8.24	11	2012	Colombo – R. Premadasa Stadium	
322	Uva Next	Wayamba United	40.0	8.05	14	2012	Colombo – R. Premadasa Stadium	
319	Nagenahira Nagas	Kandurata Warriors	39.3	8.07	10	2012	Colombo – R. Premadasa Stadium	
