= Uva Next =

Personnel
- Captain: Thilina Kandamby
- Coach: Robin Singh
- Owner: Success Sports Private Limited

Team information
- City: Badulla
- Founded: 2011 (as Uva Unicorns)
- Dissolved: 2012

History
- SLPL wins: 1

Uva Next was a franchise cricket team that took part in Sri Lanka Premier League, representing the Uva province. Success Sports Private Limited purchased the team for $4.6 million in 2012. They owned the team for seven years, after which a new agreement could be negotiated.

== History ==
The Uva cricket team was a Sri Lankan cricket team that represented the Uva Province. The team was established in 2004 and only featured in the 2003–04 season of the Inter-Provincial First Class Tournament. The team was captained by Chaminda Vaas. In the 2011 edition of Sri Lanka Premier League the Uva Province team was known as the Uva Unicorns. But after the franchise model was introduced the team owners changed the name to Uva Next.

After the franchise model was introduced for the Sri Lanka Premier League in 2012, Uva made a reappearance in the Sri Lankan cricketing arena as Uva Next. The team was captained by Thilina Kandamby in the 2012 season as their marquee player Chris Gayle could not participate due to an injury.

=== 2012 season ===
The team was one of only seven teams taking part in the inaugural edition of the Sri Lanka Premier League held in August 2012. During the first player Draft for the inaugural SLPL season, conducted in July 2012, the Uva team bought a number of contemporary star cricketers such as Chris Gayle, Umar Gul, Upul Tharanga, Jacob Oram, Shivnarine Chanderpaul and Thilina Kandamby. Gayle became the costliest player of the draft, as the Uva franchise bought him for $100,000. They also bought Sri Lankan and Foreign Internationals such as Sachithra Senanayake, Dilhara Fernando, Seekkuge Prasanna, Callum Ferguson, Andrew McDonald, Shoaib Malik and some very promising domestic players such as Dilshan Munaweera, Banuka Rajapaksha and Charith Jayampathi.

The Uva Next got on to a great start defeating a very strong Basnahira Cricket Dundee team in their opening match. The strong Uva bowling line up which performed really well in their opening match was very well backed up with their batting. But the winning ways quickly came to an end when they met the red hot favorites of the tournament Wayamba United. Though their bowlers restricted the opposition to a competitive score the uva batting collapsed giving Wayamba United the win. Although losing their second match the Uva Next team soon got into winning ways defeating Uthura Rudras and Ruhuna Royals to record two consecutive wins. This meant that they had to win only one more match to qualify for the semi-finals. The next match with the Kandurata Warriors was an important game for both teams meaning that the winner would join Wayamba United in the semi-finals. For the joy of both teams the match was abandoned due to heavy rains this meant that both teams would qualify for the semis. The last match in the group stage was Played against the Nagenahira Nagas this match was an important match because the loser of this match would face Wayamba United in the semi-finals. Both teams were in hot pursuit of winning to avoid facing the strongest team the Wayamba United. Uva Next scored 160 runs but this wasn't enough against a strong batting order plus about three of their best player had to leave during the match due to injury.

In the first semi-final Uva were lucky to retain two of their injured players but they lost Upul Tharanga due to a finger dislocation. Uva had a bad start and was scoring at a slow pace but because of a calm innings by Chandrpaul and a quick fire 40 by Oram Uva managed to score 171 runs. With the ball it was a magical start by uva taking the first 7 wickets for just 27 runs but a good partnership between Azar Mahamood and Isuru Udana Wayaba United scored 151 runs. But this meant that Uva Next would face the Nagenahira Nagas in the final of the inaugural edition of Sri Lanka Premier League. In the final Nagenahira chose to bat they could not get of to a flyer but after 9.1 overs because of rain the game was shorten to a 15 over match Nagas scored 135 curtsy a 27 ball 73 by Angelo Matthews. Knowing the weather Uva got to a flying start but after 5.1 overs rain returned and the match was stopped according to (D/L) method Uva needed to score 44 runs they scored 63 runs and was crowned the first ever champions of SLPL and qualified for the Champions League.

== Squad ==
The captain of Uva Next in the inaugural season of SLPL was supposed to be Chris Gayle but due to an injury the captaincy was awarded to former Sri Lankan vice-captain Thilina Kandamby.Shivnarine Chanderpaul was brought in as a replacement for Gayle. Gayle was named the icon player for Uva and he received the highest salary in the SLPL of $100,000. The Uva Next squad consisted of six Overseas players in the tournament.

Players with international caps are listed in bold. Ages as of 11 August 2012.

No.	Name	Nationality	Birth date	Batting style	Bowling style	Notes
Batsmen
6	**Shivnarine Chanderpaul**	Guyana	16 August 1974 (aged 37)	Left-handed	Right-arm leg break	Overseas player
–	**Chris Gayle**	Jamaica	21 September 1979 (aged 32)	Left-handed	Right-arm off break	Overseas player
25	**Thilina Kandamby**	Sri Lanka	4 June 1982 (aged 30)	Left-handed	Leg break	Captain
27	Bhanuka Rajapaksa	Sri Lanka	24 October 1991 (aged 20)	Left-handed	Right-arm medium	
241	Dilshan Munaweera	Sri Lanka	24 April 1989 (aged 23)	Right-handed	Right-arm off break	
–	**Callum Ferguson**	Australia	21 November 1984 (aged 27)	Right-handed	Right-arm medium	Overseas player
–	**Fawad Alam**	Pakistan	8 October 1985 (aged 26)	Left-handed	Slow left arm orthodox	Overseas player
–	Ashen Silva	Sri Lanka	12 July 1990 (aged 22)	Left-handed	Right-arm off break	
–	Ashan Priyanjan	Sri Lanka	14 August 1989 (aged 22)	Right-handed	Right-arm medium-fast	
All-rounders
24	**Jacob Oram**	New Zealand	28 July 1978 (aged 34)	Left-handed	Right-arm fast-medium	Overseas player
34	**Andrew McDonald**	Australia	5 June 1981 (aged 31)	Right-handed	Right-arm fast-medium	Overseas player
51	**Shoaib Malik**	Pakistan	1 February 1982 (aged 30)	Right-handed	Right-arm off break	Overseas player
–	**James Franklin**	New Zealand	7 November 1980 (aged 31)	Left-handed	Left-arm fast-medium	Overseas player
–	**Chinthaka Jayasinghe**	Sri Lanka	19 May 1978 (aged 34)	Right-handed	Right-arm medium	
–	Saliya Saman	Sri Lanka	25 November 1985 (aged 26)	Right-handed	Right-arm medium-fast	
73	**Hammad Azam**	Pakistan	16 March 1991 (aged 21)	Right-handed	Right-arm medium	Overseas player
Wicket-keepers
44	**Upul Tharanga**	Sri Lanka	2 February 1985 (aged 27)	Left-handed		
15	Sameera de Zoysa	Sri Lanka	31 January 1987 (aged 25)	Left-handed		
–	Akila Isanka	Sri Lanka	15 January 1989 (aged 23)	Left-handed	Slow left arm orthodox	
Bowlers
18	**Sachithra Senanayake**	Sri Lanka	9 February 1985 (aged 27)	Right-handed	Right-arm off break	
26	**Dilhara Fernando**	Sri Lanka	19 July 1979 (aged 33)	Right-handed	Right-arm fast-medium	
89	Charith Jayampathi	Sri Lanka	1 February 1991 (aged 21)		Left-arm medium-fast	
41	**Seekkuge Prasanna**	Sri Lanka	27 June 1985 (aged 27)	Right-handed	Leg break	
55	**Umar Gul**	Pakistan	14 April 1984 (aged 28)	Right-handed	Right-arm fast-medium	Overseas player
–	**Abdur Rehman**	Pakistan	1 March 1980 (aged 32)	Left-handed	Slow left arm orthodox	Overseas player
–	Dinesh Daminda	Sri Lanka	23 October 1983 (aged 28)	Right-handed	Right-arm medium-fast	
–	Vishwa Fernando	Sri Lanka	18 September 1991 (aged 20)	Right-handed	Left-arm medium-fast	
–	Lahiru Madushanka	Sri Lanka	12 September 1992 (aged 19)	Right-handed	Right-arm fast-medium	

== Results ==
=== Overall results ===
Performance summary
Year	Matches	Wins	Losses	No Result	Success Rate	Summary
2012	8	5	2	1	62.5%	Champions(2012)

=== Result summary ===
Opposition	Span	Mat	Won	Lost	Tied	NR	%
Basnahira Cricket Dundee	2012	1	1	0	0	0	100.00
Kandurata Warriors	2012	1	0	0	0	1	0.00
Nagenahira Nagas	2012	2	1	1	0	0	50.00
Ruhuna Royals	2012	1	1	0	0	0	100.00
Uthura Rudras	2012	1	1	0	0	0	100.00
Wayamba United	2012	2	1	1	0	0	50.00

12 August
20:00 (D/N)
Scorecard

Basnahira Cricket Dundee; 136/9 (20 overs)	v	Uva Next; 139/2 (18.2 overs)
Tillakaratne Dilshan 56 (48); Dilhara Fernando 5/17 (3 overs)		Upul Tharanga 65* (53); Rangana Herath 1/17 (4 overs)

Uva Next won by 8 wickets
R. Premadasa Stadium, Colombo
Umpires: Nishan Dhanasinghe and Ruchira Palliyaguru
Player of the match: Dilhara Fernando (Uva Next)

- Basnahira Cricket Dundee won the toss and elected to bat.

17 August
16:00 (D/N)
Scorecard

Wayamba United; 147/9 (20 overs)	v	Uva Next; 127 (18.1 overs)
Kamran Akmal 36 (32); Jacob Oram 3/6 (4 overs)		Dilshan Munaweera 26 (19); Chathuranga Kumara 3/33 (4 overs)

Wayamba United won by 20 runs
Pallekele International Cricket Stadium
Umpires: Asoka de Silva and Ruchira Palliyaguru
Player of the match: Chathuranga Kumara (Wayamba United)

- Uva Next won the toss and elected to field.

19 August
20:00 (D/N)
Scorecard

Uthura Rudras; 124/8 (20 overs)	v	Uva Next; 126/6 (19.1 overs)
Janaka Gunaratne 30* (17); Sachithra Senanayake 3/16 (4 overs)		Dilshan Munaweera 36 (25); Chathura Peiris 2/24 (4 overs)

Uva Next won by 4 wickets
Pallekele International Cricket Stadium
Umpires: Asoka de Silva and Tyron Wijewardene
Player of the match: Sachithra Senanayake (Uva Next)

- Uthura Rudras won the toss and elected to bat.

21 August
16:00 (D/N)
Scorecard

Uva Next; 155/6 (20 overs)	v	Ruhuna Royals; 141/9 (20 overs)
Upul Tharanga 48 (40); Wahab Riaz 3/34 (4 overs)		Wahab Riaz 31* (18); Seekkuge Prasanna 4/19 (4 overs)

Uva Next won by 14 runs
Pallekele International Cricket Stadium
Umpires: Asoka de Silva and Tyron Wijewardene
Player of the match: Seekkuge Prasanna (Uva Next)

- Uva Next won the toss and elected to bat.

25 August
20:00 (D/N)
Scorecard

Kandurata Warriors	v	Uva Next

Match abandoned without a ball bowled
R. Premadasa Stadium, Colombo
Umpires: Asoka de Silva and Sagara Gallage

27 August
20:00 (D/N)
Scorecard

Uva Next; 160/7 (20 overs)	v	Nagenahira Nagas; 163/4 (19.1 overs)
Dilshan Munaweera 45 (35); Shaminda Eranga 2/25 (4 overs)		Imran Nazir 44 (25); Charith Jayampathi 2/37 (4 overs)

Nagenahira Nagas won by 6 wickets
R. Premadasa Stadium, Colombo
Umpires: Asoka de Silva and Maurice Zilwa
Player of the match: Imran Nazir (Nagenahira Nagas)

- Uva Next won the toss and elected to bat.

Semi-final 1

28 August
20:00 (D/N)
Scorecard

Uva Next; 171/6 (20 overs)	v	Wayamba United; 151/8 (20 overs)
Shivnarine Chanderpaul 50* (41); Abdul Razzaq 2/17 (4 overs)		Azhar Mahmood 75* (47); Jacob Oram 3/16 (4 overs)

Uva Next won by 20 runs
R. Premadasa Stadium, Colombo
Umpires: Asoka De Silva and Tyron Wijewardene
Player of the match: Jacob Oram (Uva)

- Uva Next won the toss and elected to bat

Final

31 August
20:00 (D/N)
Scorecard

Nagenahira Nagas; 134/4 (15 overs)	v	Uva Next; 63/1 (5.1 overs)
Angelo Mathews 73* (27); Andrew McDonald 2/24 (3 overs)		Dilshan Munaweera 44 (23); Ajantha Mendis 1/25 (2 overs)

Uva Next won by 19 runs (D/L)
R. Premadasa Stadium, Colombo
Umpires: Asoka de Silva and Ruchira Palliyaguru
Player of the match: Dilshan Munaweera (Uva)

- Nagenahira Nagas won the toss and elected to bat.
- Rain first reduced the match to 15 overs per side. Rain stopped play after 5.1 overs in Uva Next's innings. Their target would have been 45 runs according to the Duckworth–Lewis method.
