= 2011 Sri Lanka Premier League =

- 2011 Sri Lanka Premier League logo
- Administrator: Sri Lanka Cricket
- Cricket format: Twenty20
- Tournament format(s): Round-robin and knockout
- Champions: Event cancelled
- Participants: 7
- Matches: 24

The 2011 Sri Lanka Premier League was a postponed Twenty20 cricket league. It was scheduled as the first edition of the new Twenty20 domestic cricket competition in Sri Lanka, from 19 July to 4 August. It was postponed until 2012, which was held as the 2012 Sri Lanka Premier League, after problems due to allegations of corruption and incompetence by Sri Lanka Cricket. The Board of Control for Cricket in India had also decided not to allow Indian players to play in the tournament.

The proposed tournament included seven teams representing the provinces of Sri Lanka. The teams were to be captained by six national captains and a former Sri Lanka vice-captain. The tournament was to feature over 30 international cricketers and be the first of its kind in Sri Lanka.

== Teams ==
Unlike other cricket leagues, the Sri Lanka Premier League did not have city-based teams but instead provincial teams to allow an entire province to associate themselves with a team and thus create a bigger following for the tournament. Seven teams were established in seven provinces, with three being created in 2011. Aside from the Nagenahira Nagas and the Uthura Oryxes, each of these teams played in a previous Inter-Provincial tournament. North Central and Sabaragamuwa Provinces did not have teams for the first season. Teams for all the provinces were limited to ensure competitiveness for the future.

Team	Province	Captain
Basnahira Bears	Western	Tillakaratne Dilshan
Kandurata Kites	Central	Kumar Sangakkara
Nagenahira Nagas	Eastern	Shahid Afridi
Ruhuna Rhinos	Southern	Sanath Jayasuriya
Uthura Oryxes	Northern	Daniel Vettori
Uva Unicorns	Uva	Chaminda Vaas
Wayamba Wolves	North Western	Mahela Jayawardene

== Venue ==
All of the matches in the tournament were to be played at R Premadasa Stadium, Colombo.

Colombo
R Premadasa Stadium
Capacity: 35,000

Venues in Sri Lanka

== Squads ==
Each team was due to have a total squad sizes between 16 and 18 players, including up to five overseas players, only four of whom were to be allowed to play in any given match. There had to be a minimum seven Sri Lankan players, with one player being an under-21 cricketer. Each team would have had an icon or marquee player, as well as a prominent ex-Sri Lanka player as a mentor or coach.

== Media coverage ==
All 24 matches were planned to be telecast live to every cricketing nation.
