= English cricket team in Sri Lanka in 2014–15 =

England in Sri Lanka in 2014–15
	Sri Lanka	England
- Dates: 21 November 2014 – 16 December 2014
Captains	Angelo Mathews	Alastair Cook

One Day International series
- Results: Sri Lanka won the 7-match series 5–2
Most runs	Kumar Sangakkara (454)	Joe Root (367)
Most wickets	Tillakaratne Dilshan (12)	Chris Woakes (14)
- Player of the series: Tillakaratne Dilshan (SL)

The England cricket team toured Sri Lanka from 21 November to 16 December 2014 playing a seven-match ODI series against the Sri Lankan national cricket team. It was Sri Lanka's first seven-match ODI series played at home. Sri Lanka won the 7-match series 5–2. The series marked the final international matches that Mahela Jayawardene played in his home country and Kumar Sangakkara's final ODIs at home before their retirements after the 2015 Cricket World Cup.

== Squads ==
ODIs
Sri Lanka	England
Angelo Mathews (c); Tillakaratne Dilshan; Shaminda Eranga; Lahiru Gamage; Rangana Herath; Mahela Jayawardena; Thilina Kandamby; Jeevan Mendis; Ajantha Mendis; Kusal Perera; Dilruwan Perera; Thisara Perera; Dhammika Prasad; Kumar Sangakkara (wk); Sachithra Senanayake; Lahiru Thirimanne	Alastair Cook (c); Moeen Ali; James Anderson; Ian Bell; Ravi Bopara; Jos Buttler (wk); Steven Finn; Harry Gurney; Alex Hales; Chris Jordan; Eoin Morgan (vc); Joe Root; Ben Stokes; James Taylor; James Tredwell; Chris Woakes

== Tour matches ==
=== One-day: Sri Lanka A v England XI ===
21 November 2014
10:45
Scorecard

Sri Lanka A 198/6 (43 overs)	v	England XI; 145/2 (25 overs)
Kusal Perera 56 (74); Moeen Ali 3/29 (9 overs)		Moeen Ali 56 (37); Lahiru Gamage 2/36 (7 overs)

England XI won by 56 runs (D/L)
Sinhalese Sports Club Ground, Colombo
Umpires: Ravindra Kottahachchi (SL) and Pradeep Udawatta (SL)

- Sri Lanka A won the toss and elected to bat.
- Rain before the match reduced the game to 43 overs per side.
- Bad light later ended England's innings with 25 overs played, at which point their target was 90 runs.

=== One-day: Sri Lanka A v England XI ===
23 November 2014
09:45
Scorecard

Sri Lanka A	v	England XI

Match abandoned without a ball bowled
P. Sara Oval, Colombo
Umpires: Nishan Dhanasinghe (SL) and Prageeth Rambukwella (SL)

- No toss

== ODI series ==
=== 1st ODI ===
26 November 2014
14:30
Scorecard

Sri Lanka; 317/6 (50 overs)	v	England; 292 (47.1 overs)
Tillakaratne Dilshan 88 (98); James Tredwell 2/52 (10 overs)		Moeen Ali 119 (87); Thisara Perera 3/44 (9.1 overs)

Sri Lanka won by 25 runs
R. Premadasa Stadium, Colombo
Umpires: Simon Fry (Aus) and Ruchira Palliyaguruge (SL)
Player of the match: Tillakaratne Dilshan (SL)

- England won the toss and elected to field.
- Start delayed until 15:30 due to rain.
- Moeen Ali (Eng) scored his maiden century in ODIs.

=== 2nd ODI ===
29 November 2014
10:00
Scorecard

England; 185 (43 overs)	v	Sri Lanka; 186/2 (34.2 overs)
Ravi Bopara 51 (69); Ajantha Mendis 3/33 (7 overs)		Mahela Jayawardene 77* (80); Steven Finn 1/35 (6 overs)

Sri Lanka won by 8 wickets
R. Premadasa Stadium, Colombo
Umpires: Steve Davis (Aus) and Raveendra Wimalasiri (SL)
Player of the match: Mahela Jayawardene (SL)

- England won the toss and elected to bat.
- Rain delayed the start of play by 75 minutes and reduced the match to 45 overs per side.

=== 3rd ODI ===
3 December 2014
14:30
Scorecard

Sri Lanka; 242/8 (35 overs)	v	England; 236/5 (33.4 overs)
Kumar Sangakkara 63 (62); Chris Woakes 3/41 (7 overs)		Moeen Ali 58 (40); Angelo Mathews 2/34 (7 overs)

England won by 5 wickets (D/L)
Mahinda Rajapaksa International Cricket Stadium, Hambantota
Umpires: Simon Fry (Aus) and Ruchira Palliyaguruge (SL)
Player of the match: Jos Buttler (Eng)

- Sri Lanka won the toss and elected to bat.
- Play was suspended due to bad light after two overs. The match was then reduced to a 35 overs-a-side. England's target was adjusted to 236 runs on the Duckworth–Lewis method.
- Kumar Sangakkara (SL) became the fourth player to score 13,000 runs in ODIs.
- England captain Alastair Cook was given a one-match ban for England's slow over rate.

=== 4th ODI ===
6 December 2014
10:00
Scorecard

England; 265 (50 overs)	v	Sri Lanka; 267/4 (49.4 overs)
James Taylor 90 (109); Rangana Herath 3/36 (10 overs)		Kumar Sangakkara 86 (105); Chris Jordan 2/35 (10 overs)

Sri Lanka won by 6 wickets
R. Premadasa Stadium, Colombo
Umpires: Steve Davis (Aus) and Ranmore Martinesz (SL)
Player of the match: Kumar Sangakkara (SL)

- England won the toss and elected to bat.
- Eoin Morgan was the stand-in captain for England, due to Alastair Cook's one-match ban. Morgan was fined 20% of his match fee for the team's slow over-rate in this match.

=== 5th ODI ===
10–11 December 2014
14:30
Scorecard

Sri Lanka; 239 (49 overs)	v	England; 240/5 (49.1 overs)
Kumar Sangakkara 91 (123); Chris Woakes 6/47 (8 overs)		Joe Root 104* (117); Sachithra Senanayake 2/35 (10 overs)

England won by 5 wickets
Pallekele International Cricket Stadium, Pallekele
Umpires: Ruchira Palliyaguruge (SL) and Rod Tucker (Aus)
Player of the match: Joe Root (Eng)

- England won the toss and elected to field.
- Rain stopped play at the end of the Sri Lankan innings and no further play was possible. England's innings resumed on the next day, which was a reserve day.
- Sachithra Senanayake played his first ODI since being banned for an illegal bowling action.

=== 6th ODI ===
13 December 2014
10:00
Scorecard

Sri Lanka; 292/7 (50 overs)	v	England; 202 (41.3 overs)
Kumar Sangakkara 112 (112); Chris Woakes 2/51 (10 overs)		Joe Root 55 (76); Suranga Lakmal 4/30 (8 overs)

Sri Lanka won by 90 runs
Pallekele International Cricket Stadium, Pallekele
Umpires: Ranmore Martinesz (SL) and Bruce Oxenford (Aus)
Player of the match: Kumar Sangakkara (SL)

- Sri Lanka won the toss and elected to bat.

=== 7th ODI ===
16 December 2014
14:30
Scorecard

Sri Lanka; 302/6 (50 overs)	v	England; 215 (45.5 overs)
Tillakaratne Dilshan 101 (124); Moeen Ali 2/39 (10 overs)		Joe Root 80 (99); Seekkuge Prasanna 3/35 (8 overs)

Sri Lanka won by 87 runs
R. Premadasa Stadium, Colombo
Umpires: Ranmore Martinesz (SL) and Rod Tucker (Aus)
Player of the match: Tillakaratne Dilshan (SL)

- Sri Lanka won the toss and elected to bat.
- This was Mahela Jayawardene's last International match in Sri Lanka.
- Kumar Sangakkara's last ODI in Sri Lanka.
- Tillakaratne Dilshan passed 9000 runs in ODIs.
