= Thilan Samaraweera =

Sri Lankan cricketer (born 1976)

Thilan Samaraweera (ලෑලි සමරේ)
Personal information
- Full name: Thilan Thusara Samaraweera
- Born: 21 September 1976 (age 50); Colombo, Sri Lanka
- Height: 5 ft 9 in (1.75 m)
- Batting: Right-handed
- Bowling: Right-arm off break
- Role: Batsman
- Relatives: Dulip Samaraweera (brother)

International information
- National side: Sri Lanka (1998–2013)
- Test debut (cap 86): 29 August 2001 v India
- Last Test: 3 January 2013 v Australia
- ODI debut (cap 97): 6 November 1998 v India
- Last ODI: 2 April 2011 v India

Domestic team information
- Years: Team
- 1996–1998: Colts Cricket Club
- 1998–2013: Sinhalese Sports Club
- 2008–2010: Kandurata
- 2011: Wayamba
- 2012: Kandurata Warriors
- 2013: Worcestershire (squad no. 3)

Career statistics
Competition	Test	ODI	FC	LA
Matches	81	53	271	195
Runs scored	5,462	862	15,501	3,568
Batting average	48.76	27.80	48.59	32.73
100s/50s	14/30	2/0	43/76	2/19
Top score	231	105*	231	105*
Balls bowled	1,327	702	17,961	4,769
Wickets	15	11	357	110
Bowling average	45.93	49.27	23.43	28.89
5 wickets in innings	0	0	15	2
10 wickets in match	0	0	2	0
Best bowling	4/49	3/34	6/55	7/30
Catches/stumpings	45/–	17/–	202/–	66/–
Medal record
Men's Cricket
Representing Sri Lanka
ICC Cricket World Cup
Runner-up	2011 India–Bangladesh–Sri Lanka
- Source: ESPNcricinfo, 18 August 2014

Thilan Thusara Samaraweera (Sinhala: තිලාන් සමරවීර; born 22 September 1976) is a former Sri Lankan international cricketer. Samaraweera played international cricket for Sri Lanka. Known as Sri Lanka's crisis man and for his slow strike rate, He is also nicknamed “Bullet Samaraweera" following his wounding during the 2009 terror attack on his national team bus in Pakistan. He retired after over 80 matches with a batting average over 48 in Test cricket. He was a part of the Sri Lankan squad which finished as runners-up at the 2011 Cricket World Cup.

== Personal life ==
Thilan Samaraweera born in Colombo and had his education at Ananda College, Colombo. He is married to Erandathie Samaraweera and has two daughters: Osuni and Sidhya. His brother, Dulip Samaraweera, also played Test cricket, appearing in seven Tests from 1993 to 1995. His brother-in-law Bathiya Perera has represented Sri Lanka A.

== Early career ==
Thilan played school cricket for Ananda College and emerged as a prolific batsman in inter-school competitions. He initially was a frontline spinner at school level. He spearheaded the bowling attack of Ananda capturing 72 wickets in 1984 and 64 wickets in 1985 season. He amassed 1000 runs in 1994 and 1995 seasons. He won the Sri Lankan Schoolboy Cricketer of the Year in 1994 and 1995.

== Domestic career ==
He was drafted to the Kandurata Warriors side ahead of the inaugural edition of the Sri Lanka Premier League in 2012. He signed with Worcestershire County Cricket Club for the 2013 County Championship.

== International career ==
Samaraweera managed a handful of ODI games in 1998 but did not play Test cricket until August 2001. He made his ODI debut against India on 6 November 1998 but he was not given the opportunity to bat in the middle order on his ODI debut as he was listed as no 10 batsman. In his next 2 ODI appearances, he batted at no 8 and in his fourth ODI match he batted as a tailender at no 11 position.

Having worked on his batting considerably with his shadow coach Chandika Hathurusingha he got due reward by scoring century on debut against a strong Indian side helping Sri Lanka to win the series 2–1. He continued to star with the bat by scoring another two centuries in his next five Tests, all on his home ground, the SSC in Colombo. This stunning start to international cricket cemented his spot in the middle order, a spot which had holes to fill with the retirements of Aravinda de Silva and Hashan Tillakaratne. He emerged as a frontline batsman in international arena at a time when many Sri Lankan batsmen were nearing the end of their prime. However, he was in and out of Sri Lankan limited overs team as he made a comeback return to the ODI side in 2005 after two years.

His off-spin has been rarely called upon by his captain but when he comes on he has earned a reputation as a partnership breaker. After a poor Test series in England in which he failed to reach double figures in any of his four innings, he was dropped from the side. He was made captain of Sri Lanka A before earning a recall for the first Test against Australia in Brisbane. He scored 13 and 20 and was promptly dropped when Kumar Sangakkara returned to the side for the second game in Hobart. This was followed by his non-inclusion in the squad to play England in the first Test in Kandy.

Samaraweera was included in the Sri Lankan team to play the Test series in Pakistan in February – March 2009. This series was conducted after the Indian team withdrew from a scheduled series in Pakistan, following the 2008 Mumbai attacks. Samaraweera started off the series in superb form, hitting consecutive double centuries – 231 in the first Test in Karachi and 214 in the second Test in Lahore. He too has the record for the highest individual score for Sri Lanka when batting at number 5 position in tests when he scored 231 against Pakistan. Also, Thilan Samaraweera was the first ever Sri Lankan to score a test century at number 8 position and holds the record for the highest score for Sri Lanka jointly with Kithuruwan Vithanage at number 8 position in tests (103*) During the test tour of Pakistan in 2009, he was highlighted for his machine gun celebration after scoring a century and it was considered as a quite new celebration by a player in international cricket at that time although he did it on numerous occasions in domestic circuit.

In February 2009, he shared a record-breaking partnership of 437 with Mahela Jayawardene. This is a world record for 4th wicket in Test cricket. The previous Test record was held by an English pair—Peter May and Colin Cowdrey—who put on 411 against West Indies at Birmingham in May 1957. The record stood for 6 years until surpassed on 11 December 2015 by two Aussies Adam Voges and Shaun Marsh with 449 for fourth wicket against West Indies. He ended the 2009 season on a high note with 1234 runs in 11 test matches at an average of 72.58.

In September 2009, he scored his maiden ODI century against New Zealand national cricket team at R. Premadasa Stadium, Colombo, almost eleven years after his ODI debut. He scored his next ODI century against India during a 50 over Tri-nation series in Bangladesh in 2010. He was often criticised of being a backyard bully mostly piling up runs in subcontinent amassing 4275 runs in 60 tests in Asia at an average of 54.11 and his record outside Asia was pity average scoring 1187 runs at an average of 35.96 in 21 tests. After being a victim of Lahore attack in 2009, he returned to competitive cricket and initially struggled to deliver on his comeback return.

In 2011, after poor form with the bat during a home series against Australia, he was dropped from Sri Lanka's team for the series against Pakistan. He was also left out of the squad to tour South Africa, but was given a late call-up to cover for Mahela Jayawardene due to a knee injury. He scored two centuries in the three-Test series, and moved into the top ten of the ICC Player Rankings for Test batsmen for the first time in his career.

He was selected to the Sri Lankan team for the 2011 Cricket World Cup which was also his first and only World Cup appearance. He also appeared in the final of the 2011 Cricket World Cup and he played a crucial role by adding 57 runs for the fourth wicket with Mahela Jayawardene.

Samaraweera holds the record for scoring the most runs in ODI cricket with only scoring centuries without even dismissed between 50 and 99, he never had scores of unbeaten innings between 50 and 99. He has scored 2 ODI hundreds without a single ODI fifty. He also ended his ODI career without hitting a six despite two centuries to his name.

In March 2013, he announced his retirement from international cricket after being overlooked for a home Test series against Bangladesh.

== Lahore attack ==
Samaraweera, along with five teammates, was injured in the 3 March 2009 attack on the bus that carried the Sri Lankan team to the Gaddafi Stadium in Lahore, Pakistan. He was hospitalised with a thigh injury. Samaraweera was the most seriously injured player amongst them. Thilan suffered a major injury on his left thigh as a bullet fired by a terrorist pierced through his knee well inside his body by 12 inches. Six policemen that guarded the bus and two civilians were killed in the attack. He then underwent surgery, remained at hospital for two weeks and took brief break from cricket for roughly 4 months. The doctors advised him that he may not ever play cricket again but he soon overcame the obstacles and mental trauma following the attack. He also revealed that he was still haunted by the 2009 Lahore terrorist attack. He returned to cricket in June 2009 following his surgery. He was believed to have undergone 2 and half hours operation at the Nawaloka Hospital in Colombo and fears were also raised that he could be forced to retire from international cricket.

== Coaching career ==
He became the batting consultant for Bangladesh in September 2016 ahead of the Bangladesh's home Test series against England. He was employed by Cricket Australia as a consultant coach for Australian team for the test tour of Sri Lanka. He served as batting consultant for Bangladesh until the 2017 ICC Champions Trophy and BCB did not extend the contract after the Champions Trophy.

In November 2017, he was named as Sri Lanka's batting coach till 2019 ICC Cricket World Cup. However, he stepped down from the role of Sri Lanka's batting coach in 2018 following the end of Sri Lanka's test series in New Zealand. During the New Zealand tour around 2018, he was known for serving as a personal mentor to Kusal Mendis and Thilan made sure that Kusal Mendis was not dropped for the test match at Wellington.

He was appointed as the fielding coach of the Kolkata Knight Riders in 2018 for the Indian Premier League. In 2019, he was roped in by New Zealand Cricket to work with New Zealand cricket team for the test tour of Sri Lanka.

In August 2021, he was included in New Zealand's coaching staff for the New Zealand cricket team's tour of Bangladesh and Pakistan.
