= Chamara Kapugedera =

Sri Lankan cricketer

Personal information
- Full name: Chamara Kantha Kapugedera
- Born: 24 February 1987 (age 39); Kandy, Sri Lanka
- Nickname: Kapu
- Height: 5 ft 11 in (1.80 m)
- Batting: Right-handed
- Bowling: Right arm medium
- Role: Middle-order Batsman

International information
- National side: Sri Lanka (2006–2017)
- Test debut (cap 104): 11 May 2006 v England
- Last Test: 26 August 2009 v New Zealand
- ODI debut (cap 129): 29 January 2006 v Australia
- Last ODI: 18 October 2017 v Pakistan
- ODI shirt no.: 16
- T20I debut (cap 6): 15 June 2006 v England
- Last T20I: 6 April 2017 v Bangladesh

Domestic team information
- Years: Team
- 2005/06–present: Colombo Cricket Club
- 2008–2010: Chennai Super Kings
- 2013: Duronto Rajshahi
- 2015: Chittagong Vikings

Career statistics
Competition	Test	ODI	T20I
Matches	8	102	43
Runs scored	418	1,624	703
Batting average	34.83	21.09	22.67
100s/50s	0/4	0/8	0/1
Top score	96	95	50
Balls bowled	12	264	–
Wickets	0	2	–
Bowling average	–	112.50	–
5 wickets in innings	–	0	–
10 wickets in match	–	0	–
Best bowling	–	1/24	–
Catches/stumpings	6/–	31/–	17/–
Medal record
Men's Cricket
Representing Sri Lanka
ICC Cricket World Cup
Runner-up	2011 India–Bangladesh–Sri Lanka
- Source: ESPNricinfo, 20 August 2017

Chamara Kantha Kapugedera (Sinhala: චාමර කපුගෙදර, born 24 February 1987) is a former international Sri Lankan cricketer who played all formats of the game, and was a former One Day International captain.

He was a permanent member in the national team from the debut match until 2010, and finally poor performances dropped him from the squad, until his comeback in 2015. He is an alumnus of Dharmaraja College, Kandy. He was also a member of the first Twenty20 International match for Sri Lanka, and capped no. 6. Kapugedara re-entered the national team in the mid-2015 and played the role of a middle order batsmen. In December 2019, he retired from all forms of cricket.

== Domestic career ==
Kapugedera made his first-class debut in a match for Sri Lanka A against New Zealand A in 2005. In domestic cricket, he plays for Colombo Cricket Club. His inconsistency during 2009 has proved costly, with more young players coming through to challenge for his place in the team. Chennai Super Kings put him on sale for the 2009 Indian Premier League, but no team came forward to bid for him despite the very low starting price. In 2012, Kapugedera was included to the Uthura Rudras for Sri Lanka Premier League tournament. He scored 69 runs in a match-winning knock against Basnahira Cricket Dundee, which was Rudras' first victory in SLPL.

In Dhaka Premier Division 2014–15 season, he played for Victoria Sporting Club. In a match against Prime Bank Cricket Club, Kapugedera led his team for a big win with an unbeaten 161 and four wickets.

In March 2018, he was named in Kandy's squad for the 2017–18 Super Four Provincial Tournament. The following month, he was also named in Kandy's squad for the 2018 Super Provincial One Day Tournament.

== International career ==
=== Early years ===
An aggressive right-handed batsman, Kapugedera got his first taste of international cricket when he made his One Day International debut against Australia in Perth in 2006. He made his Test cricket debut in the first Test against England at Lord's Cricket Ground in London, in May 2006, in which he made a first ball duck in the first innings. A stylish and classical player, he is also known for his big hitting against Brett Lee and his innings of 38 runs from 21 balls, inclusive of 2 fours and 3 sixes, in the first final of the VB Series held in 2006. This innings bolstered Sri Lanka's total and ensured that Australia lost their first home final in 9 years.

In 2009 in the second ODI against Pakistan, Kapugedera scored unbeaten 69 runs to lead Sri Lanka to win and series leads 2–0.

=== Inconsistency ===
Although Kapugedera showed huge potential in both one day and Test cricket, with some mature innings, his overall inconsistency lead to him being dropped from both teams. However, after the 2007 Cricket World Cup he began to stabilise his position in the one day team, and in 2008 some good performances cemented his position in the number 4 position. This included a 95 against West Indies when Sri Lanka were in trouble, and in the 2008 Asia Cup.

=== Prominence ===
However, the doors were opened him for the 2010 ICC World Twenty20 in West Indies, where his talents emerged again. The most notable knock came during the match with India on 11 May 2010, where Kapugedera sent India home with a last ball winning six on Ashish Nehra bowling. Sri Lanka needed three runs off the last ball, Kapugedera smashed a mighty shot over cover for six allowing the team for the victory. He scored unbeaten 37 runs in the match.

He along with Chamara Silva set the record for the highest 6th wicket stand for Sri Lanka in ODI cricket with 159 runs. Kapugedara along with Angelo Mathews set the record for the highest ever fifth wicket stand for Sri Lanka in T20 World Cup history with 80 runs.

On 2 March 2012, Kapugedera was named as a replacement for injured all-rounders in the ODI squad that qualified for the finals of the 2011–12 Commonwealth Bank Series.

=== Comeback ===
Many critics argued that, he probably the best option for the place of legendary Mahela Jayawardene in ODI team, but due to many talented young cricketers, he was unable to enter the squad, only named to the 15-named squad in Pakistan series 2015. However, after about 3 years of scarcity in international cricket, Kapugedera was called up for the T20I series against Pakistan in July 2015. He made his comeback with a strong note by scoring unbeaten 31 runs in the first match, eventually Sri Lanka lost the match. He scored his highest T20I score of 48* in the second match in this series. The innings was impressed by the commentators, but finally Sri Lanka lost the match and also the series.

After 3 years of ODI rest, Kapugedera was included to the ODI squad for New Zealand in 2015–16 season as a middle order batsman. He was only able to score 8 runs in the first ODI where Sri Lanka were all out for 188 runs and lost the match by 7 wickets. Kapugedera played only one ODI against Pakistan in 2017–18 season in the UAE. In the match he scored only 18 runs from 30 balls. During the fielding, Kapugedra struck the ball under the right eye after a throw from the keeper Dickwella, caused heavy swelling. After the incidence, he was removed from the next match and then from the series as well.

=== Captaincy ===
Kapugedara was appointed as the vice captain of the ODI squad for the series against India in late July 2017. In the second ODI, Tharanga has been suspended with two ODIs due to slow over rate. With that, Kapugedera was appointed as the captain of ODI team for rest of the two ODIs. He captained third ODI, which is a must win game for series alive. However, he won the toss and elected to bat first. The decision went wrong very quickly, where Sri Lanka only managed to score 218 at the end. India won the match easily and won eighth consecutive bilateral ODI series win against Sri Lanka. During the last phase of India's innings, crowd started to throw bottles into the ground and play was arrested for 35 minutes as well.

== Personal life ==
Kapugedera is married to his longtime partner, Tamara Derek on 16 December 2010 where the wedding ceremony was taken place at Waters Edge Hotel, Battaramulla. They have three children Akshan, Yenith and Yhavin, all of which are boys.
