= Chinthaka Jayasinghe =

Sri Lankan cricketer (born 1979)

Personal information
- Full name: Halwathurage Chinthaka Umesh Jayasinghe
- Born: 19 May 1978 (age 48); Kalutara, Sri Lanka
- Height: 6 ft 1 in (1.85 m)
- Batting: Right-handed
- Bowling: Right-arm medium
- Role: All-rounder

International information
- National side: Sri Lanka (2009–2010)
- T20I debut (cap 31): 9 December 2009 v India
- Last T20I: 22 May 2010 v New Zealand

Domestic team information
- Years: Team
- 1996–1998: Burgher Recreation Club
- 1999: Nondescripts Cricket Club
- 1999–2003: Burgher Recreation Club
- 2003–2004: Chilaw Marians Cricket Club
- 2004: Burgher Recreation Club
- 2005–2012: Bloomfield Cricket and Athletic Club

Career statistics
Competition	T20I	FC	LA	T20
Matches	5	142	128	45
Runs scored	49	6,417	2,245	752
Batting average	49.00	31.61	26.72	26.85
100s/50s	0/0	11/34	0/12	0/1
Top score	38	173*	94	67
Balls bowled	0	5,246	4,034	438
Wickets	–	104	110	30
Bowling average	–	24.20	23.13	19.10
5 wickets in innings	–	1	1	0
10 wickets in match	–	0	0	0
Best bowling	–	5/39	5/44	4/17
Catches/stumpings	0/–	114/–	51/–	16/–
- Source: ESPNcricinfo, 2 January 2013

Chinthaka Umesh Jayasinghe (born 19 May 1978) is a former Sri Lankan T20I cricketer. He is now based in Australia and works as a bus driver.

Jayasinghe is a past student of Kalutara Vidyalaya and Dharmapala College, Pannipitiya.

== Early life ==
He commenced his cricketing career as a school boy, playing at the Under 13, 15, 17 and 19 levels, representing his school Dharmapala College, Pannipitiya. He was the captain of the school team at all these levels. he continue to hold a Sri Lankan school cricket record, scoring consecutive 1000 run seasons in three consecutive years (1994/95, 1995/96,1996/97).

== Domestic career ==
His first national representation occurred in 1994 as a member of Sri Lankan under 17 Cricket Mini World Cup Team that played in Malaysia. he was a member of the Sri Lankan U19 cricket team from 1994 to 1997 and was the captain of that team in 1997. As a member of the U.19 Sri Lankan team he played against England, India, Singapore, Canada, Pakistan and Hong Kong. Selected for the Sri Lankan A team in 1998, he became a regular member until 2004.

He made his Twenty20 debut on 17 August 2004, for Burgher Recreation Club in the 2004 SLC Twenty20 Tournament.

His performance in the Sri Lankan A team and in first class cricket earned him a regular spot in the Sri Lankan Six A Side team where he participated in five Hong Kong Cricket Sixes tournaments. He was offered a Sri Lankan Cricket Annual National Player Contract in 2008 as a T20 Specialist and said contract continued into the 2009 and 2010 seasons. In the year 2011, he was offered a Sri Lankan Cricket National Provincial Player contract.

Also, he was a member of Sri Lanka team in the 2010 Asian Games in China. He achieved a number of national records in first class cricket such as fastest century, most number of sixes in the seasons (2010/11 &2011/12) etc. Also, he led his club (Bloomfield CAC) to the championship of the Premier Trophy First Class Tournament in 2010/11. Commending his outstanding achievements, he was awarded the Man of the Tournament title in the Premier League (First Class) Tournament in 2008/09. He played 142 first class matches and 128 List-A matches. He scored more than 8500 runs and took 200+ wickets in both formats during his 14 years in a first class cricket career. he was selected for the Uva Next Sri Lanka Premier League (SLPL, T20) team which won the championship in that year. Subsequently, he was part of the Premier league team that represented Sri Lanka in the 2012 Champions League tournament held in South Africa.

He retired from all first class cricket in 2014.

He has since been playing in Australia where he started at Greenvale Cricket club and then moved to the Westmeadows Cricket Club in Melbourne, Australia in the Victorian Turf Cricket Association, where he has won many accolades and two championships.

== International career ==
He made his T20I debut against India at Nagpur in 2009. He was a member of the Sri Lankan cricket team for the 2010 ICC World Twenty20 played in the West Indies in 2010 and Trevor Bayliss was the head coach. Sri Lanka achieved the semi-final stage and he played a vital role.
