= Kosala Kulasekara =

Sri Lankan cricketer (born 1985)

Personal information
- Full name: Chamith Kosala Bandara Kulasekara
- Born: 15 July 1985 (age 41); Mawanalle, Sri Lanka
- Height: 6 ft 1 in (1.85 m)
- Batting: Right-handed
- Bowling: Right-arm fast medium
- Role: All-rounder

International information
- National side: Sri Lanka (2011–2012)
- Only Test (cap 121): 3 November 2011 v Pakistan
- ODI debut (cap 149): 11 November 2011 v Pakistan
- Last ODI: 17 January 2012 v South Africa

Domestic team information
- Years: Team
- Nondescripts Cricket Club
- Kandurata Warriors

Career statistics
Competition	Test	ODI	FC	LA
Matches	1	4	73	84
Runs scored	22	22	2,773	1,493
Batting average	11.00	11.00	25.91	26.19
100s/50s	0/0	0/0	2/14	0/5
Top score	15	15	129	74
Balls bowled	168	78	6,796	2,837
Wickets	1	0	149	71
Bowling average	80.00	–	26.79	30.42
5 wickets in innings	0	–	3	0
10 wickets in match	0	–	0	0
Best bowling	1/65	–	6/13	4/27
Catches/stumpings	0/0	1/–	35/0	26/0
Medal record
Men's Cricket
Representing Sri Lanka
Asian Games
Gold medal – first place	2014 Incheon	Team
- Source: Cricinfo, 23 January 2017

Chamith Kosala Bandara Kulasekara (born 15 July 1985) is a professional Sri Lankan cricketer. He is an all-rounder, batting right-handed and bowling right-arm fast medium.

== Domestic career ==
He played domestic cricket for the Nondescripts Cricket Club and the Ruhuna Rhinos. He is also a member of Western Troopers in SLC Super 4's T20 tournament. In April 2018, he was named in Dambulla's squad for the 2018 Super Provincial One Day Tournament.

He was a part of 2004 Sri Lanka's ICC Youth World Cup squad. He played his u19 cricket alongside Upul Tharanga, Farveez Maharoof, Kaushal Silva and Suraj Randiv.

He performed commendably during the u19 World Cup in Bangladesh and won Man of the Match awards for his 5/27 vs Canada and 37 runs vs Zimbabwe.

Later in his career, he moved to Baduraliya SC.

== International career ==
He has played in one Test, where he made his debut against Pakistan in 2011 at Sharjah. He made his ODI debut in the same tour against Pakistan on 11 November 2011 at Dubai.

== See also ==
- One-Test wonder
