= Travis Birt =

Australian cricketer

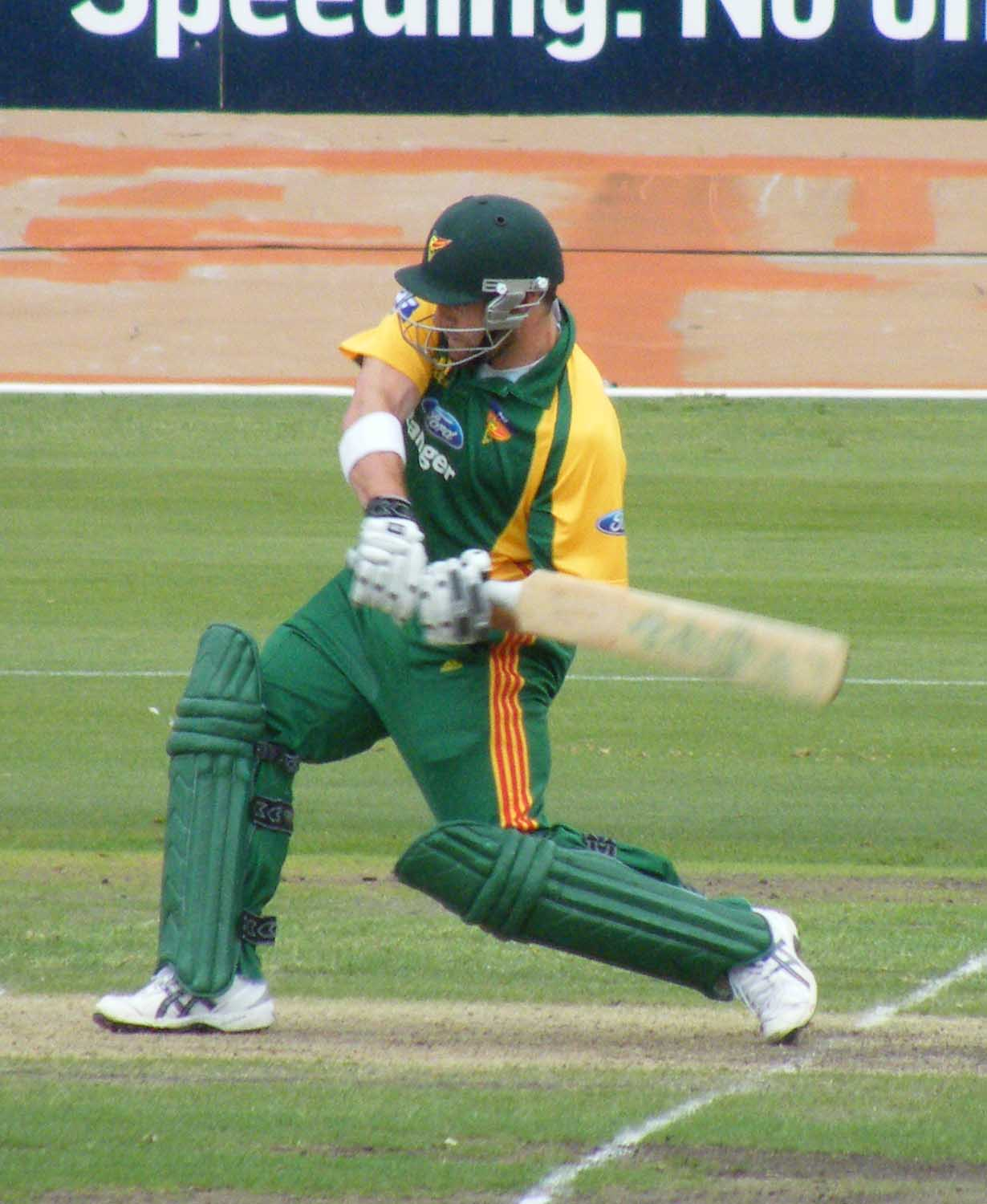

Personal information
- Full name: Travis Rodney Birt
- Born: 9 December 1981 (age 44); Sale, Victoria, Australia
- Nickname: Edgar, Turtle, Ernie
- Height: 1.78 m (5 ft 10 in)
- Batting: Left-handed
- Bowling: Right-arm medium
- Role: Middle-order batter

International information
- National side: Australia (2010–2012)
- T20I debut (cap 42): 5 February 2010 v Pakistan
- Last T20I: 3 February 2012 v India

Domestic team information
- Years: Team
- 2003/04–2010/11: Tasmania
- 2006–2007: Derbyshire
- 2010/11–2013/14: Wellington
- 2011: Delhi Daredevils
- 2011/12–2012/13: Western Australia
- 2011/12–2014/15: Hobart Hurricanes
- 2012: Nagenahira Nagas
- 2013: Khulna Royal Bengals
- 2014/15: Northern Districts

Career statistics
Competition	T20I	FC	LA	T20
Matches	4	88	119	109
Runs scored	31	5,223	3,222	2,188
Batting average	10.33	34.58	30.39	22.79
100s/50s	0/0	9/32	2/21	0/9
Top score	17	181	145	94*
Balls bowled	–	220	91	–
Wickets	–	2	5	–
Bowling average	–	98.00	17.80	–
5 wickets in innings	–	0	0	–
10 wickets in match	–	0	0	–
Best bowling	–	1/24	2/15	–
Catches/stumpings	1/–	62/–	42/1	41/–
- Source: ESPNcricinfo, 29 January 2019

Travis Rodney Birt (born 9 December 1981) is an Australian former cricketer. A left-handed batsman, Birt represented the Australian national under-19 team before making his debut for Tasmania during the 2003–04 season. Strong form at state level led to his selection for Australia A during the 2006 off-season, as well as a two-year stint with Derbyshire in English county cricket. Birt transferred to Western Australia for the 2011–12 season, but has found more success in the Twenty20 format, variously representing the Wellington Firebirds, Delhi Daredevils, Nagenahira Nagas, and Khulna Royal Bengals in New Zealand, Indian, Sri Lankan, and Bangladeshi domestic tournaments, respectively. Birt made his Twenty20 International debut for Australia in February 2010, and played a total of four matches for the team, with his last international match coming in February 2012.

In December 2015 Travis Birt was selected in the Perth Scorchers squad against Brisbane Heat in BBL 5. He was selected as a local replacement player for Nathan Coulter-Nile.

== Early cricket career ==
Birt secured a reputation for brutal strokeplay when he posted 145 against South Australia in 2004–05, the highest score in Tasmania's one-day history. He made his first-class debut in the same season but had to wait until the following year to feel at ease at the next level. After an outstanding 2005–06 season in which he was selected for the Australia A cricket team, Birt produced a couple of consistent if unexceptional seasons for Tasmania. His main problem has been an inability to turn starts into first-class centuries. In 2006–07 he was part of Tasmania's triumphant Pura Cup team and made 736 runs at 38.73 with one hundred, and the next season he collected 565 runs at 31.38 without once reaching triple-figures. A former Academy and Australia Under-19 player who relocated from country Victoria, Birt has spent time playing with Derbyshire but did not return there in 2008 and instead had hip surgery during the off-season.

== International debut ==
On 5 February 2010, Birt made his Twenty20 International, and subsequent international debut for Australia, against Pakistan at the Melbourne Cricket Ground. He failed to make an impact, scoring only one run before being bowled by acting Pakistani captain Shoaib Malik. Birt was retained in the team for the second and final Twenty20 match at Bellerive Oval in Hobart—his home ground. However, he could only manage 13 from ten balls, as Australia completed a 2–0 sweep.

Despite being dropped for the First Twenty20 International against New Zealand in Wellington, Birt was recalled for the second match where he did not bat. At the end of both innings' the scores were tied, before New Zealand won courtesy of a super-over, levelling the series 1–1.

== Move to Western Australia ==
In 2011, Birt moved to Western Australia. He had also signed up to play for the Hobart Hurricanes in the Big Bash League.

In 2015 Birt was given a BBL recall after a few strong performances in the WACA statewide 20/20 competition for Claremont Nedlands Cricket Club. In the second round of the qualifying Birt hit 136 off just 53 deliveries as Claremont Nedlands defeated Scarborough by 104 runs with a team that included Andrew Tye.

== Career highlights ==
In 2012, in the KFC Big Bash match between Hobart Hurricanes and Melbourne Stars, Birt scored the fastest 50 in Australian Domestic T20 Cricket. In this match, Birt struck 50 runs off 22 balls, eclipsing the mark set earlier in the same match by Luke Wright of the Melbourne Stars who scored 50 runs off 23 balls.
