= Charith Jayampathi =

Sri Lankan cricketer (born 1991)

Personal information
- Full name: Wijesinghe Mudiyanselage Charith Jayampathi
- Born: 1 February 1991 (age 35); Matale, Sri Lanka
- Batting: Left-handed
- Bowling: Left-arm medium fast
- Source: Cricinfo, 3 February 2016

Charith Jayampathi (born 1 February 1991) is a Sri Lankan first-class cricketer. He plays for Tamil Union Cricket and Athletic Club.

Jayampathi represented Sri Lanka in the 2010 Under-19 Cricket World Cup held in New Zealand. His best performance came during the U-19 tour of Australia in 2009, where he secured nine wickets, becoming the leading Sri Lankan wicket taker in the tour.

Jayampathi started his first-class cricket career with the Seeduwa Raddoluwa Cricket Club during the 2008–09 season.
