= Jacob Oram =

New Zealand cricketer

Personal information
- Full name: Jacob David Philip Oram
- Born: 28 July 1978 (age 48); Palmerston North, Manawatu, New Zealand
- Height: 1.98 m (6 ft 6 in)
- Batting: Left-handed
- Bowling: Right-arm fast-medium
- Role: All-rounder

International information
- National side: New Zealand (2001–2012)
- Test debut (cap 222): 12 December 2002 v India
- Last Test: 26 August 2009 v Sri Lanka
- ODI debut (cap 120): 4 January 2001 v Zimbabwe
- Last ODI: 6 November 2012 v Sri Lanka
- ODI shirt no.: 24
- T20I debut (cap 15): 21 October 2005 v South Africa
- Last T20I: 30 October 2012 v Sri Lanka
- T20I shirt no.: 24

Domestic team information
- Years: Team
- 1997/98–2013/14: Central Districts
- 2008–2010: Chennai Super Kings
- 2011: Rajasthan Royals
- 2012: Uva Next
- 2013: Chittagong Kings
- 2013: Mumbai Indians

Career statistics
Competition	Test	ODI	T20I	FC
Matches	33	160	36	85
Runs scored	1,780	2,434	474	3,992
Batting average	36.32	24.09	20.60	33.83
100s/50s	5/6	1/13	0/2	8/18
Top score	133	101*	66*	155
Balls bowled	4,964	6,911	546	10,682
Wickets	60	173	19	155
Bowling average	33.05	29.17	41.73	26.91
5 wickets in innings	0	2	0	3
10 wickets in match	0	0	0	0
Best bowling	4/41	5/26	3/33	6/45
Catches/stumpings	15/0	51/–	12/–	36/–
- Source: ESPNcricinfo, 29 April 2022

Jacob David Philip Oram (born 28 July 1978) is a former New Zealand international cricketer, who played all forms of the game for 10 years. He was a left-handed batsman and a right-arm fast-medium bowler. His ability with both bat and ball made him a regular member in the New Zealand international sides.

Usually batting in the middle to lower order, Oram's bowling has been more successful in the shorter format—reaching as high as 5 in the ICC ODI Player Rankings. Standing at 1.98m (6 ft 6 in), he was a schoolboy representative as a football goalkeeper. He played for the Manawatu cricket team in the Hawke Cup. He also played for the Mumbai Indians in the Indian Premier League.

Oram is on the Lord's Honours Boards for his Test century against England in 2008 and has on several occasions occupied the position of World #1-ODI Allrounder.

== Personal life ==
He attended Palmerston North Intermediate Normal School, and later Palmerston North Boys' High School.

In March 2008 Oram married his partner of eight years, Mara Tait-Jamieson, also of Palmerston North. Having returned from a brief residence in Auckland, the pair now live in Palmerston North with their son, Patrick, and beloved Labrador, Leo. Oram's brother Daniel is an English teacher at Auckland Grammar School.

== International career ==
He is one of 36 New Zealand Test cricketers to have scored 1,000 runs and one of just six New Zealanders to have reached the double of 1,000 ODI runs and 100 wickets.

In 2003–04 season, Oram fell just short of a maiden Test hundred, with 97 against Pakistan, brought up his first Test hundred in his next Test match, against South Africa, with 119 not out, and scored 90 in the following Test. His second Test hundred was 126 not out against Australia in Brisbane, against both Shane Warne and Glenn McGrath. His 3rd Test hundred was again South Africa, with a career highest of 133.

On 28 January 2007, in Perth, Oram smashed an unbeaten 101 off 72 balls in an ODI against Australia. It was at the time the fastest ever ODI century by a New Zealander, and also the fastest ever made against Australia. His 137 run partnership with Brendon McCullum was, at the time, the highest ever for the New Zealand 6th wicket, though this record was broken the following month.

=== Injury issues ===
He injured his left ring finger in an ODI prior to the World Cup, and, on 28 February, with the tournament just weeks away, he revealed that he would be willing to have it amputated in order to play cricket. However, Oram later clarified his claim as being in a jocular context and the comment intended to convey his strong desire to participate.

During the 2009 ICC Champions Trophy in South Africa Oram could not play a single game as he injured his ankle.

On 3 March 2010 Oram again injured his patella tendon against Australia, thus leading him to miss another series and also the 2010 IPL.

=== Comeback ===
On 9 November 2009 Oram picked up 3/20 against Pakistan in the nervewrecking final of the Cool&Cool Cup in Abu Dhabi.

Oram made his 12th ODI half century after 14 months against Bangladesh in Napier on 5 February 2010. He scored a rapid 83 off just 40 balls and hit 8 fours and 5 sixes.

Oram returned to international action in the 2010 ICC World Twenty20.

During the 2011 World Cup quarter final he took arguably the best catch of the tournament, off Jacques Kallis, a blinder on the mid-wicket boundary to prevent a six and with 4 for 39 helped the Black Caps take a well deserved victory against a favourite South African side.

=== Hat trick club ===
On 2 September 2009, Oram took a hat-trick against Sri Lanka in a Twenty20 International in Colombo, dismissing Angelo Mathews, Malinga Bandara and Nuwan Kulasekara.

== Retirement ==
On 13 October 2009, Oram announced his retirement from Test cricket.

== Domestic career ==
For the 2013 IPL, Jacob Oram was signed by the Mumbai Indians.

In 2014, Oram became the bowling coach of "New Zealand A", a reserve side for Black Caps, and is currently mentoring Adam Milne. In 2019 he was appointed coach of the Manawatu cricket team, which competes in the Hawke Cup.
