= Sachithra Senanayake =

Sri Lankan cricketer

Personal information
- Full name: Senanayake Mudiyanselage Sachithra Madhushanka Senanayake
- Born: 9 February 1985 (age 41); Colombo, Sri Lanka
- Height: 6 ft 0 in (1.83 m)
- Batting: Right-handed
- Bowling: Right-arm off break
- Role: Bowler

International information
- National side: Sri Lanka (2012–2016)
- Only Test (cap 125): 31 December 2013 v Pakistan
- ODI debut (cap 150): 20 January 2012 v South Africa
- Last ODI: 28 December 2015 v New Zealand
- ODI shirt no.: 18
- T20I debut (cap 43): 1 June 2012 v Pakistan
- Last T20I: 9 September 2016 v Australia

Domestic team information
- Years: Team
- 2006–: Sinhalese Sports Club
- 2012–: Basnahira cricket team
- 2013/14: Sydney Sixers
- 2013: Kolkata Knight Riders
- 2015: Worcestershire
- 2015: Rangpur Riders

Career statistics
Competition	Test	ODI	FC	LA
Matches	1	49	107	167
Runs scored	5	290	2,614	1,582
Batting average	5.00	13.18	23.76	21.67
100s/50s	0/0	0/0	2/9	1/6
Top score	5	42	120	150
Balls bowled	138	2,358	23,292	8,014
Wickets	0	53	537	243
Bowling average	–	34.35	20.81	21.76
5 wickets in innings	–	0	38	3
10 wickets in match	–	0	7	0
Best bowling	–	4/13	8/70	5/23
Catches/stumpings	1/–	19/–	112/–	82/–
- Source: ESPNcricinfo, 3 November 2019

Senanayake Mudiyanselage Sachithra Madhushanka Senanayake (Sinhala: සචිත්‍ර සේනානායක; born 9 February 1985) is a Sri Lankan playback singer and former professional cricketer who played all three formats of the game. He is first-class cricketer, who currently plays limited overs cricket. A bowling all-rounder, he bats right-handed and bowls off spin. He has played first-class cricket for the Sinhalese Sports Club since 2006.

He is the 150th ODI cap for Sri Lanka. Senanayake was a key member of 2014 ICC World Twenty20 winning team.

Senanayake was arrested on 6 September 2023 on match-fixing charges and was subsequently indicted on 5 June 2025.

== Domestic career ==
His call-up followed a domestic season in which he had taken the most wickets in the Sri Lankan Premier League limited overs tournament. During the 2013 Indian Premier League auction he was bought by Kolkata Knight Riders for $15,000. On 2015, he contracted for 2014 NatWest t20 Blast in England for the team Worcestershire.

In March 2018, he was the leading wicket-taker in the 2017–18 Premier Limited Overs Tournament, with seventeen dismissals in eight matches. Later the same month, he was named in Dambulla's squad for the 2017–18 Super Four Provincial Tournament. The following month, he was also named in Dambulla's squad for the 2018 Super Provincial One Day Tournament.

In February 2019, Sri Lanka Cricket named him as the Best Bowler in the 2017–18 Premier Limited Overs Tournament. In March 2019, he was named in Kandy's squad for the 2019 Super Provincial One Day Tournament.

== International career ==
Senanayake made his international debut for Sri Lanka in the fourth One Day International (ODI) of the tour of South Africa in January 2012. From then, he was a regular part of Sri Lanka's spin attack in limited over cricket with Ajantha Mendis and occasionally with Seekkuge Prasanna. After a suspect bowling action, he showed poor bowling in later bilateral tournaments. However, he was included to the 15-men 2015 ICC World Cup tournament as the main spinner of the team.

He was also named in the T20I XI by ESPNcricinfo for his performances in 2013.

=== Bowling action ===
He was reported for bowling with a suspected illegal bowling action against England in June 2014 and subsequently banned from bowling in international cricket in July 2014. He was cleared to bowl in December 2014 and played in the fifth ODI against England.

=== Mankading incident ===
In 2014, he Mankaded the English batsman Jos Buttler in a One Day International.

=== Remodel action ===
Senanayake was cleared from the illegal bowling action with future notices and played in the 7-match ODI series against England at home. He was again called up for the 2015 Cricket World Cup and did not have much impact in the pool match against Australia. He re-appeared in the fifth ODI against Pakistan in July 2015, where he took three crucial wickets.

The re-modeling action somewhat gave weaker performances in international arena to Senenayake.

== Beyond cricket ==
Senananyake is a student of musician Sanath Nandasiri since school times. Due to cricketing career he missed music industry as he said. He is known to be a good singer and sang his first solo song Watina obage which was released in May 2016. He also contributed for the cricket song Kirula Genemu by Centigradz, which was released prior to 2015 Cricket World Cup.

== Arrest and indictment for match-fixing ==
On 6 September 2023, Senanayake was arrested on charges related to match-fixing. The alleged incident took place during the 2020 Lanka Premier League. He was subsequently indicted by the Attorney General at the Hambantota High Court on 5 June 2025.

== See also ==
- One-Test wonder
