= Dilshan Munaweera =

Sri Lankan cricketer

Personal information
- Full name: Eldeniya Medagedara Dilshan Yasika Munaweera
- Born: 24 April 1989 (age 37); Colombo, Sri Lanka
- Height: 5 ft 7 in (1.70 m)
- Batting: Right-handed
- Bowling: Right-arm off break

International information
- National side: Sri Lanka (2012–2017)
- ODI debut (cap 182): 31 August 2017 v India
- Last ODI: 3 September 2017 v India
- T20I debut (cap 46): 18 September 2012 v Zimbabwe
- Last T20I: 29 October 2017 v Pakistan
- T20I shirt no.: 24

Domestic team information
- Years: Team
- 2015: Sylhet Super Stars
- 2016: Barisal Bulls
- 2014: Bloomfield Cricket and Athletic Club
- 2021: Dambulla Giants

Career statistics
Competition	ODI	T20I	LA	T20
Matches	2	13	149	148
Runs scored	15	215	3233	2,994
Batting average	7.50	17.91	24.05	22.27
100s/50s	0/0	0/1	2/17	0/12
Top score	11	53	142	82
Balls bowled	–	60	3,164	1,409
Wickets	–	1	95	65
Bowling average	–	92.00	25.03	28.56
5 wickets in innings	–	0	2	0
10 wickets in match	–	0	0	0
Best bowling	–	1/26	6/9	4/35
Catches/stumpings	2/–	1/–	39/–	19/–
- Source: ESPNcricinfo, 26 July 2022

Eldenia Medagedara Dilshan Yasika Munaweera, commonly known as Dilshan Munaweera (Sinhala: ඩිල්ශාන් මුණවීර; born 24 April 1989 in Colombo), is a professional Sri Lankan cricketer, who played limited over formats for the national side. He was a member of 2012 ICC World Twenty20 for Sri Lanka. Dilshan was the highest run getter and the man of the final in the inaugural Sri Lanka Premier League. He is a right-handed batsman, who can hit very hard and a handy off-break bowler.

== Early and domestic career ==
Coming from a cricketing background Munaweera is the son of former first class cricketer Sudath Munaweera and Manjula Munaweera also played women's cricket. Munaweera got married in 2016 to Sanjeewani Palihakkara who is a fashion designer.

He was educated at Nalanda College Colombo and played cricket for the college first XI team from 2006 to 2008.

In April 2018, he was named in Colombo's squad for the 2018 Super Provincial One Day Tournament. In November 2021, he was selected to play for the Colombo Stars following the players' draft for the 2021 Lanka Premier League.

== International career ==
Munaweera has played first-class cricket for Bloomfield Cricket and Athletic Club. He has also played four Twenty20 Internationals for Sri Lanka.

He represented Sri Lanka at the 2008 ICC Under-19 Cricket World Cup and at the 2010 Asian Games, winning the silver medal in the cricket event at the latter event.

Munaweera was picked up for the 3-T20Is against Australia in 2017 as a senior batsman, where many senior players were ruled out due to injuries. In his comeback match on 17 February 2017, Munaweera scored 29-ball 44 runs to provide a fast start to the chase. Sri Lanka finally won the match by 5 wickets. In August 2017, he was added to Sri Lanka's One Day International (ODI) squad ahead of the fourth match against India. He made his ODI debut on 31 August 2017 against India. He only scored 11 runs and Sri Lanka lost the match by 168 runs.

In May 2018, he was one of 33 cricketers to be awarded a national contract by Sri Lanka Cricket ahead of the 2018–19 season.
