= Kandurata Warriors =

Personnel
- Captain: (Sri Lanka) Kumar Sangakkara
- Owner: Number One Sports Consulting; Private Limited

Team information
- City: Kandy
- Founded: 2011 (as Kandurata Kites)
- Dissolved: 2012
- Home ground: Pallekele stadium
- Capacity: 35,000

History
- SLPL wins: 0
- Notable players: Sanath Jayasuriya

The Kandurata Warriors is a Twenty20 cricket team that competes in the Sri Lanka Premier League, representing Central Province. Somerset Entertainment Ventures (S) Pte Ltd purchased the team for $5.32 million in 2012. They were owned for seven years, after which a new agreement could be negotiated.

== History ==
Australian player Adam Voges did not play in the SLPL 2012 due to pressure from his current team Nottinghamshire. Although Voges, the former Australia international who has played in the IPL and more recently for Melbourne Stars in the Big Bash League, is listed as one of eight overseas players on the roster of the Kandurata franchise, Notts insisted his obligations at Trent Bridge be met in full.

== Current squad ==
Players with international caps are listed in bold.

No.	Name	Nat	Birth date	Batting style	Bowling style	Notes
Batsmen
3	**Thilan Samaraweera**	(Sri Lanka)	22 September 1976 (age 49)	Right-handed	Right-arm off break	
23	**Misbah-ul-Haq**	(Pakistan)	28 May 1974 (age 51)	Right-handed	Leg break	
7	**Sanath Jayasuriya**	(Sri Lanka)	30 June 1969 (age 56)	Left-handed	Slow left arm orthodox	Captained the team during Sangakkara's injury.
24	**Jeevantha Kulatunga**	(Sri Lanka)	2 November 1973 (age 52)	Right-handed	Right-arm medium	
69	Chris Lynn	(Australia)	10 April 1990 (age 35)	Right-handed	Slow left arm orthodox	
8	Kithuruwan Vithanage	(Sri Lanka)	26 February 1991 (age 34)	Left-handed	Leg break	
9	**Tharanga Paranavitana**	(Sri Lanka)	15 April 1982 (age 43)	Left-handed	Right-arm off break	
–	**Adam Voges**	(Australia)	4 October 1979 (age 46)	Right-handed	Slow left arm orthodox	
–	**Malinda Warnapura**	(Sri Lanka)	26 May 1979 (age 46)	Left-handed	Right-arm off break	
–	Rumesh Buddika	(Sri Lanka)	14 November 1990 (age 35)	Left-handed	Right-arm off break	
All-rounders
1	**Thisara Perera**	(Sri Lanka)	3 April 1989 (age 36)	Left-handed	Right-arm medium-fast	
2	**Kaushal Lokuarachchi**	(Sri Lanka)	20 May 1982 (age 43)	Right-handed	Leg break	
4	**Kosala Kulasekara**	(Sri Lanka)	15 July 1985 (age 40)	Right-handed	Right-arm fast-medium	
14	**John Hastings**	(Australia)	4 November 1985 (age 40)	Right-handed	Right-arm fast-medium	
37	**Dilhara Lokuhettige**	(Sri Lanka)	3 July 1980 (age 45)	Right-handed	Right-arm fast-medium	
56	**Scott Styris**	(New Zealand)	10 July 1975 (age 50)	Right-handed	Right-arm medium	
–	**Johan Botha**	(South Africa)	2 May 1982 (age 43)	Right-handed	Right-arm off break	
–	Rubaraj Janoch	(Sri Lanka)	5 May 1991 (age 34)	Right-handed	Right-arm fast-medium	
–	**Albie Morkel**	(South Africa)	10 June 1981 (age 44)	Left-handed	Right-arm medium-fast	
Wicket-keepers
27	**Kaushal Silva**	(Sri Lanka)	27 May 1986 (age 39)	Right-handed		
–	**Kumar Sangakkara**	(Sri Lanka)	27 October 1977 (age 48)	Left-handed	Right-arm off break	Captain
–	Niroshan Dickwella	(Sri Lanka)	23 June 1993 (age 32)	Left-handed		
–	**Dane Vilas**	(South Africa)	10 June 1985 (age 40)	Right-handed		
Bowlers
12	**Chanaka Welegedara**	(Sri Lanka)	20 March 1981 (age 44)	Right-handed	Left-arm fast-medium	
33	**Sohail Tanvir**	(Pakistan)	12 December 1984 (age 41)	Left-handed	Left-arm medium-fast	
50	**Saeed Ajmal**	(Pakistan)	14 October 1977 (age 48)	Right-handed	Right-arm off break	
