= Shaminda Eranga =

Sri Lankan cricketer

Personal information
- Full name: Ranaweera Mudiyanselage Shaminda Eranga
- Born: 23 June 1986 (age 40); Chilaw, Sri Lanka
- Nickname: Shamee
- Height: 5 ft 10 in (1.78 m)
- Batting: Right-handed
- Bowling: Right-arm fast-medium
- Role: Bowler

International information
- National side: Sri Lanka (2011–2016)
- Test debut (cap 118): 16 September 2011 v Australia
- Last Test: 9 June 2016 v England
- ODI debut (cap 147): 16 August 2011 v Australia
- Last ODI: 16 June 2016 v Ireland
- T20I debut (cap 6): 7 August 2012 v India
- Last T20I: 31 March 2013 v Bangladesh

Domestic team information
- Years: Team
- Chilaw Marians
- Tamil Union
- Basnahira North

Career statistics
Competition	Test	ODI	T20I
Matches	19	19	3
Runs scored	193	34	6
Batting average	12.86	11.33	6.00
100s/50s	0/0	0/0	0/0
Top score	45*	12*	6
Balls bowled	3,891	716	66
Wickets	57	21	3
Bowling average	37.50	32.66	30.00
5 wickets in innings	0	0	0
10 wickets in match	0	0	0
Best bowling	4/49	3/46	2/30
Catches/stumpings	5/–	5/–	1/–
- Source: Cricinfo, 16 June 2016

Ranaweera Mudiyanselage Shaminda Eranga (born 23 June 1986), or Shaminda Eranga, is a professional Sri Lankan cricketer. He studied at St. Mary's College in Chilaw.

== International career ==
Shaminda made his One Day International debut for Sri Lanka on 16 August 2011 at the Mahinda Rajapaksa International Stadium, Hambantota against Australia.

He made his test debut on September 16, 2011, and took a wicket with his first ball, becoming the 15th player to do so in the history of test cricket.

His constant back injuries meant that he couldn't make the national team regularly after his Test debut, and his next international game came much later, in August 2012 against India, in which he made his Twenty20 International debut.

== Health and suspect bowling action ==
On 19 June 2016, following Sri Lanka's ODI matches in Ireland, Eranga was admitted to hospital in Dublin to undergo tests on his heart. However, on the same day, he was suspended from bowling in international matches by the International Cricket Council (ICC) due to an illegal action reported during the second Test against England earlier the previous month. He was discharged from hospital the following day. On 18 July 2017, ICC cleared Eranga bowling action, so he can play again in international cricket with his revised bowling action.

== Domestic career ==
During Sri Lanka Premier League tournament, he played for Nagenahira Nagas, where his team became runner-up of SLPL, lost final to Uva Next. He won Player of the series trophy for his bowling performances.

== See also ==
- List of bowlers who have taken a wicket with their first ball in a format of international cricket
