= Nishan Dhanasinghe =

Sri Lankan cricketer (born 1966)

Personal information
- Born: 16 August 1966 (age 60); Ambalangoda, Sri Lanka

Umpiring information
- WODIs umpired: 2 (2008–2014)
- WT20Is umpired: 3 (2013)
- Source: Cricinfo, 18 February 2016

Nishan Dhanasinghe (born 16 August 1966) is a Sri Lankan former first-class cricketer who played for Singha Sports Club.
