= Kithuruwan Vithanage =

Sri Lankan cricketer

Personal information
- Full name: Kasun Disi Kithuruwan Vithanage
- Born: 23 February 1991 (age 35); Colombo, Sri Lanka
- Height: 6 ft 0 in (1.83 m)
- Batting: Left-handed
- Bowling: Legbreak
- Role: Batsman

International information
- National side: Sri Lanka
- Test debut (cap 124): 8 March 2013 v Bangladesh
- Last Test: 10 December 2015 v New Zealand
- ODI debut (cap 158): 25 December 2013 v Pakistan
- Last ODI: 27 December 2013 v Pakistan
- T20I debut (cap 51): 20 May 2014 v England
- Last T20I: 10 January 2016 v New Zealand

Domestic team information
- Years: Team
- 2010–2011: Colombo Cricket Club
- 2013–present: Basnahira

Career statistics
Competition	Test	ODI	FC	LA
Matches	9	6	54	46
Runs scored	361	75	3,704	730
Batting average	30.08	15.00	45.72	17.80
100s/50s	1/1	0/0	11/15	0/3
Top score	103*	27	351	56
Balls bowled	174	12	546	12
Wickets	1	0	4	0
Bowling average	133.00	–	106.00	–
5 wickets in innings	0	–	0	–
10 wickets in match	0	–	0	–
Best bowling	1/73	–	2/24	–
Catches/stumpings	8/–	2/–	37/–	19/–
Medal record
Representing Sri Lanka
Men's Cricket
Asian Games
Gold medal – first place	2014 Incheon	Team
- Source: ESPN Cricinfo, 10 January 2016

Kasun Disi Kithuruwan Vithanage (Sinhala: කිතුරුවන් විතානගේ; born February 1991), or commonly Kithuruwan Vithanage, is a professional Sri Lankan cricketer who plays for all forms of the game in international level. He is a Left-hand batsman and legbreak bowler.

== International career ==
He made his test debut for Sri Lanka on 8 March 2013 Galle against Bangladesh and One day International debut 25 December 2013 at Abu Dhabi against Pakistan. He scored 59 runs on his test debut and 27 runs on ODI debut. He could not continue a good form in ODIS but scored his first test ton against Bangladesh scoring 103 not out. With that test ton, he was only the second Sri Lankan to score a test century when batting at number 8 position in tests and jointly holds the record for the highest test score with Thilan Samaraweera when batting at number 8 position for Sri Lanka. He made his T20I debut against England on May 20, 2014, and scored 38 runs.

After New Zealand tour in Sri Lanka A team, Vithanage showed his talents that he can come in to the Test side back. He was called up for the first Test against New Zealand on 10 December 2015.

== Controversies ==
Kithruwan Vithanage has been involved in several incidents regarding discipline. In one such instance in 2014, following the end of the third day of the first test match against Pakistan in Galle, he left the team hotel without permission and returned at 6.30 am next morning. According to Sri Lanka team manager Michael de Zoysa, this was not the first time he has breached team discipline. In previous occasions Vithanage had left the hotel without permission during tours of Bangladesh and England. As a result of his actions he was placed on probation for one year.

In July 2016 Sri Lanka Cricket suspended Vithanage from all forms of cricket for one year for his part in a public brawl.
