= Chathuranga Kumara =

Sri Lankan cricketer (born 1992)

Personal information
- Full name: Samitha Arachchige Chathuranga Kumara
- Born: 19 January 1992 (age 34)
- Batting: Right-handed
- Bowling: Right-arm medium-fast
- Role: Middle-order Batsman

Domestic team information
- Years: Team
- Colts Cricket Club
- Sri Lanka Under-19s
- Sri Lanka Under-23s

Career statistics
Competition	FC	LA	T20
Matches	41	59	42
Runs scored	1,257	879	383
Batting average	27.32	26.63	14.73
100s/50s	0/6	0/3	0/2
Top score	96	93	65*
Balls bowled	2,338	1,434	523
Wickets	50	39	27
Bowling average	28.26	29.41	27.14
5 wickets in innings	1	1	0
10 wickets in match	0	0	0
Best bowling	5/21	5/7	3/33
Catches/stumpings	18/–	14/0	7/–
Medal record
Representing Sri Lanka
Men's Cricket
Asian Games
Gold medal – first place	2014 Incheon	Team
- Source: Cricinfo, 6 January 2023

Chathuranga Kumara (born 19 January 1992) is a Sri Lankan cricketer. He made his first-class debut on 27 January 2012, for Colts Cricket Club in the 2011–12 Premier Trophy. He is a past pupil of St. Joseph's College, Colombo. In July 2022, he was signed by the Colombo Stars for the third edition of the Lanka Premier League.
