= Kaushal Lokuarachchi =

Sri Lankan cricketer

Personal information
- Full name: Kaushal Samaraweera Lokuarachchi
- Born: 20 May 1982 (age 44); Ratnapura, Sri Lanka
- Nickname: Loku
- Batting: Right-handed
- Bowling: Right arm leg spin
- Role: All-rounder

International information
- National side: Sri Lanka (2003-2012)
- Test debut (cap 94): 25 April 2003 v New Zealand
- Last Test: 16 March 2004 v Australia
- ODI debut (cap 115): 6 April 2003 v Kenya
- Last ODI: 13 October 2007 v England
- T20I debut (cap 6): 1 June 2012 v Pakistan
- Last T20I: 3 June 2012 v Pakistan

Domestic team information
- Years: Team
- 2000/01–2004/05: Bloomfield Cricket and Athletic Club
- 2005/06–present: Sinhalese Sports Club
- 2013 –: Dhaka Gladiators

Career statistics
Competition	Test	ODI	T20I
Matches	4	21	2
Runs scored	94	210	11
Batting average	23.50	14.00	5.50
100s/50s	0/0	0/1	0/0
Top score	28*	69	11
Balls bowled	594	1,011	36
Wickets	5	31	2
Bowling average	59.00	23.38	24.00
5 wickets in innings	0	0	0
10 wickets in match	0	0	0
Best bowling	2/47	4/44	2/31
Catches/stumpings	1/–	5/–	1/–
- Source: Cricinfo, 27 September 2016

Kaushal Samaraweera Lokuarachchi (born 20 May 1982), or Kaushal Lokuarachchi, is a Sri Lankan former cricketer, who played all formats of the game. He is a right-handed batsman and a leg-break bowler. In 2014, he was banned by BPL anti-corruption tribunal for 18 months and has not been involved in cricket since then.

== International career ==
Having made an exceptional start to his career as an allrounder when he was a schoolboy, Lokuarachchi was made part of the Sri Lankan squad after the 2003 Cricket World Cup. He primarily played as a leg-spinner, and it was thought that he would be able to capture a regular place in the team. However, having been in a car crash in August 2003 which killed a woman , he was given a four-month disciplinary ban by the Sri Lankan cricket board.

Having made his return steadily in the 2004 Provincial Tournament, he drifted back into the team, and with Muttiah Muralitharan suffering a shoulder injury he captured a place in the team for the one-day series against South Africa in the Champions Trophy.

== Arrest ==
Lokuarachchi was arrested after being involved in a motor vehicle accident which killed a pedestrian and injured her son in April 2003. He claimed that he had fallen asleep while driving. He was subsequently banned for four months by BCCSL.

== Ban ==
In June 2014, Lokuarachchi was banned from cricket for 18 months by the Bangladesh Premier League Anti Corruption Tribunal for failing to report an approach by a bookie.

== See also ==
- List of bowlers who have taken a wicket with their first ball in a format of international cricket
