= Sri Lanka Premier League =

Professional Cricket League

- Countries: Sri Lanka
- Administrator: Sri Lanka Cricket
- Format: Twenty20
- First edition: 2012
- Latest edition: 2012
- Tournament format: Round-robin and knockout
- Number of teams: 7
- Current champion: Uva Next
- Most successful: Uva Next (1 title)
- Qualification: Champions League Twenty20
- Most runs: Dilshan Munaweera (212)
- Most wickets: Jacob Oram (15)
- TV: Carlton Sports Network; ESPN; STAR Cricket
- Website: slpl.lk

The Sri Lanka Premier League (SLPL) was a Twenty20 cricket competition in Sri Lanka. It was intended to be the premier Twenty20 league in the country, held by Sri Lanka Cricket, when it replaced the Inter-Provincial Twenty20 competition.

After the 2011 season was postponed, its first season was held in 2012. The 2013 and 2014 seasons were cancelled due to organizational problems and lack of sponsorship. The Super 4's T20 replaced the tournament.

A new competition called Lanka Premier League was later created and ran its first season in 2020.

== History ==
=== Postponed 2011 tournament ===
In May 2011, Sri Lanka Cricket announced a new franchise-based Twenty20 tournament in the country, modelled on the Indian Premier League. The SLC signed a deal with Somerset Entertainment Ventures to organise the tournament. Seven teams were allocated, each representing a province. Somerset Entertainment Ventures have been given the rights to run the event for 15 years.

The first tournament was to be held at R. Premadasa Stadium in Colombo between 19 July and 4 August. However, the Board of Control for Cricket in India refused to let the 12 Indian players selected in the tournament participate. Furthermore, allegations of corruption and incompetence by SLC and its handing over of the organisation to a previously unheard of Singapore-based Somerset Entertainment Ventures put the tournament in serious jeopardy. The tournament was postponed to 2012, with the former Inter-Provincial Twenty20 taking its place. Sandiip Bhammer of SEV blamed the Indian players' withdrawal for causing sponsors to withdraw from the competition.

=== 2012 tournament ===
In February 2012, SLC signed a renewed deal with Somerset Entertainment Ventures to hold the tournament in August 2012 at Colombo and Kandy, with the seven teams as originally planned. The BCCI said that Indian players in the SLPL was a possibility. The SLPL's partnership with the MCC Spirit of Cricket initiative was similar to the MCC–DLF partnership in the 2008 IPL.

In June 2012, the seven provincial teams were changed to seven franchises, owned by private backers like the IPL and BPL.

The SLPL was officially launched on 16 July 2012 at Cinnamon Grand Colombo in Colombo. SLC Chairman Upali Dharmadasa announced plans to add two more franchises in the following years in other regions. Like the IPL, the SLPL would have cheerleaders and other entertainment, with the official website, mascot, theme song and logo of the SLPL also launched on 16 July.

The 2012 SLPL season was played in Colombo and Kandy from 11 to 31 August 2012. Out of the 24 matches scheduled, 23 took place and one was rained off. Every team played each other in a round-robin system. The top four ranking sides progressed to the knockout stage of semi-finals followed by a final at R. Premadasa Stadium, Colombo. Uva Next beat Nagenahira Nagas to become champions.

=== 2013–2014 ===
The second season was set to begin in 2013 but was cancelled after the franchises breached payment deadlines.

The 2014 season was also cancelled, with the announcement in February 2014, citing lack of meaningful sponsorship for the league.

== League organisation ==
=== Franchises ===
Aside from Nagenahira and Uthura, each of the seven proposed provincial teams had a team playing in the previous Inter-Provincial Twenty20. North Central and Sabaragamuwa Provinces did not have teams for the first season, planning to be added in future seasons.

In 2012 SLC adopted a franchise system, with the teams coming under private ownership instead of the SLC board. At auction, the seven SLPL teams fetched an average of US$4.3 million, building on a reserve of $3 million each. The franchises were derived from the province-based teams.

SLC chairman Upali Dharmadasa announced in July 2012 the SLPL planned to expand with the addition of two more teams in 2013, with all nine Sri Lankan provinces represented in the league. The 2013 season was cancelled.

Team	Province	Owner(s)	Price	Captain	Head coach
Basnahira Cricket Dundee	Western	Indian Cricket Dundee Limited	$4.33 million	Tillakaratne Dilshan	Duleep Mendis
Kandurata Warriors	Central	Number One Sports Consulting Private Limited	$4.98 million	Sanath Jayasuriya	Romesh Kaluwitharna
Nagenahira Nagas	Eastern	Varun Beverages Lanka Private Limited	$3.22 million	Angelo Mathews	Shane Duff
Ruhuna Royals	Southern	Pearl Overseas Limited	$4.6 million	Shahid Afridi	Waqar Younis
Uthura Rudras	Northern	Rudra Sports Private Limited	$3.4 million	Jehan Mubarak	Tom Moody
Uva Next	Uva	Success Sports Private Limited	$4.6 million	Thilina Kandamby	Naveed Nawaz
Wayamba United	North Western	Wadhawan Holdings Private Limited	$5.02 million	Mahela Jayawardene	Trevor Bayliss

Locations of SLPL teams

=== Draft and squads ===
Under the original 2011 system, SLC would have assigned 16-18 players to each team, with five foreign players per team, and a Sri Lankan captain. But after the 2012 franchise system was adopted, a draft was organized and a lottery held to determine the order in which players were picked. SLC determined the value of the contract for each player in advance. The players were seen as likely to be drafted in two groups – Sri Lankan players and foreign players.

Each franchise had an "icon player" and a maximum of 18 players including three under 21 players. Up to two teams in the league could nominate foreign "icon" players, and each team could field up to four foreign players per game. Out of the remaining players in the XI, one must be a Sri Lanka Under-21 international. Each squad had a minimum of seven Sri Lankan players. The 2011 captains were Sanath Jayasuriya (Ruhuna), Mahela Jayawardene (Wayamba), Kumar Sangakkara (Kandurata) and Tillakaratne Dilshan (Basnahira); for Nagenahira and Uthura, Pakistan former captain Shahid Afridi and New Zealand former skipper Daniel Vettori.

Almost all Pakistani national cricketers were invited to play in the SLPL. Salaries were lower than the IPL, with the highest at $30,000, with Shahid Afridi getting $35,000 in 2011. But in 2012 the highest salaries were $100,000 for Chris Gayle and $50,000 for Shahid Afridi.

== Results and team performances ==
Year	Final venue	Man of the tournament	Final		
Year	Final venue	Man of the tournament	Winners	Result	Runners-up
2011; Details	R. Premadasa Stadium, Colombo	Event cancelled and replaced with 2011 Inter-Provincial Twenty20.			
2012; Details	R. Premadasa Stadium, Colombo	Shaminda Eranga	Uva Next; 63 for 1 (5.1 overs)	won by 19 runs (D/L); Scorecard	Nagenahira Nagas; 134 for 4 (15 overs)
2013	Event cancelled and replaced with Sri Lanka Cricket Super 4's Twenty20 Tournament 2013				

Team performances:

Team	2012
Uva Next	Winner
Basnahira Cricket Dundee	Group stage
Kandurata Warriors	Semi-finals
Ruhuna Royals	Group stage
Nagenahira Nagas	Runners up
Uthura Rudras	Group stage
Wayamba United	Semi-finals

== Marketing ==
Marketing of the Sri Lanka Premier League was conducted by the Somerset Entertainment Ventures who marketed the tournament with ambassadors, papare bands, theme songs, mascots and cheerleaders. The tournament will also have an opening ceremony. The Premier League was predicted to generate almost 580 million Sri Lankan rupees of annual income for the Sri Lankan economy. Sandeep Bhammer of Somerset Entertainment Ventures said 130 million rupees would come from hotel accommodation.

The SLPL sponsors and partners included Wisden India, Marylebone Cricket Club on the Spirit of Cricket initiative, and YouTube. Mahindra & Mahindra Ltd. was the title sponsor for SLPL.

Sri Lanka Premier League unveiled a new changed logo at the relaunch of the 2012 tournament.

The SLPL mascot was Silva the lion, who was unveiled by the brand ambassadors, the Sri Lankan musicians duo Bathiya and Santhush. Bathiya and Santhush also composed the official tournament song.

== Broadcasters ==
Carlton Sports Network broadcast all matches live in Sri Lanka. SLPL's international broadcast partners were Asian Television Network in Canada, ESPN3 in the United States, United Kingdom and the Caribbean, and ESPN and STAR Sports in Sri Lanka, India, Bangladesh and Geosuper in Pakistan, as well as other countries in South and South East Asia. SLC president Upali Dharmadasa confirmed on 2 August 2012 that all SLPL matches will also be broadcast to a global audience via the SLPL's official YouTube channel, in the hope of benefiting the tournament through reaching more cricket fans around the world.

Television
Country	Broadcasters	Ref
Bangladesh	Gazi Television	
Pakistan	GEO Super	
Saudi Arabia	Gazi Television	
Sri Lanka	Carlton Sports Network	
Other Asian countries	STAR Cricket	
Canada	Asian Television Network	
Caribbean	ESPN3	
United Kingdom	ESPN3	
United States	ESPN3	
Worldwide online broadcast	YouTube (with 10-minute delay)	
