= Wayamba United =

Personnel
- Captain: (Sri Lanka) Mahela Jayawardene
- Coach: (Australia) Trevor Bayliss

Team information
- City: Kurunegala
- Colours: Green Blue White
- Founded: 2011 (as Wayamba Wolves)
- Dissolved: 2012
- Home ground: Welagedara Stadium
- Capacity: 10,000

History
- SLPL wins: none

Wayamba United was a franchise cricket team that took part in Sri Lanka Premier League, representing North Western Province. Wadhawan Holdings Private Limited purchased the team for $5.02 million in 2012 for a seven-year contract.

== History ==
Wayamba cricket team was a Sri Lankan first class cricket team based in Kurunegala, that represented North Western Province. It drew cricketers from Sri Lanka Premier Trophy. The team competed in two provincial tournaments: the first class cricket competition known as the Inter-Provincial Tournament, and the Twenty20 competition known as the Inter-Provincial Twenty20. Also Wayamba province cricket team became joint champions with Kandurata in the 2007/08 Inter-Provincial Limited overs tournament after the finals match drawn due to rain.

The Wayamba cricket team featured in both the 2009 and 2010 editions of the Champions League Twenty20 as the Wayamba elevens.

== Home ground ==
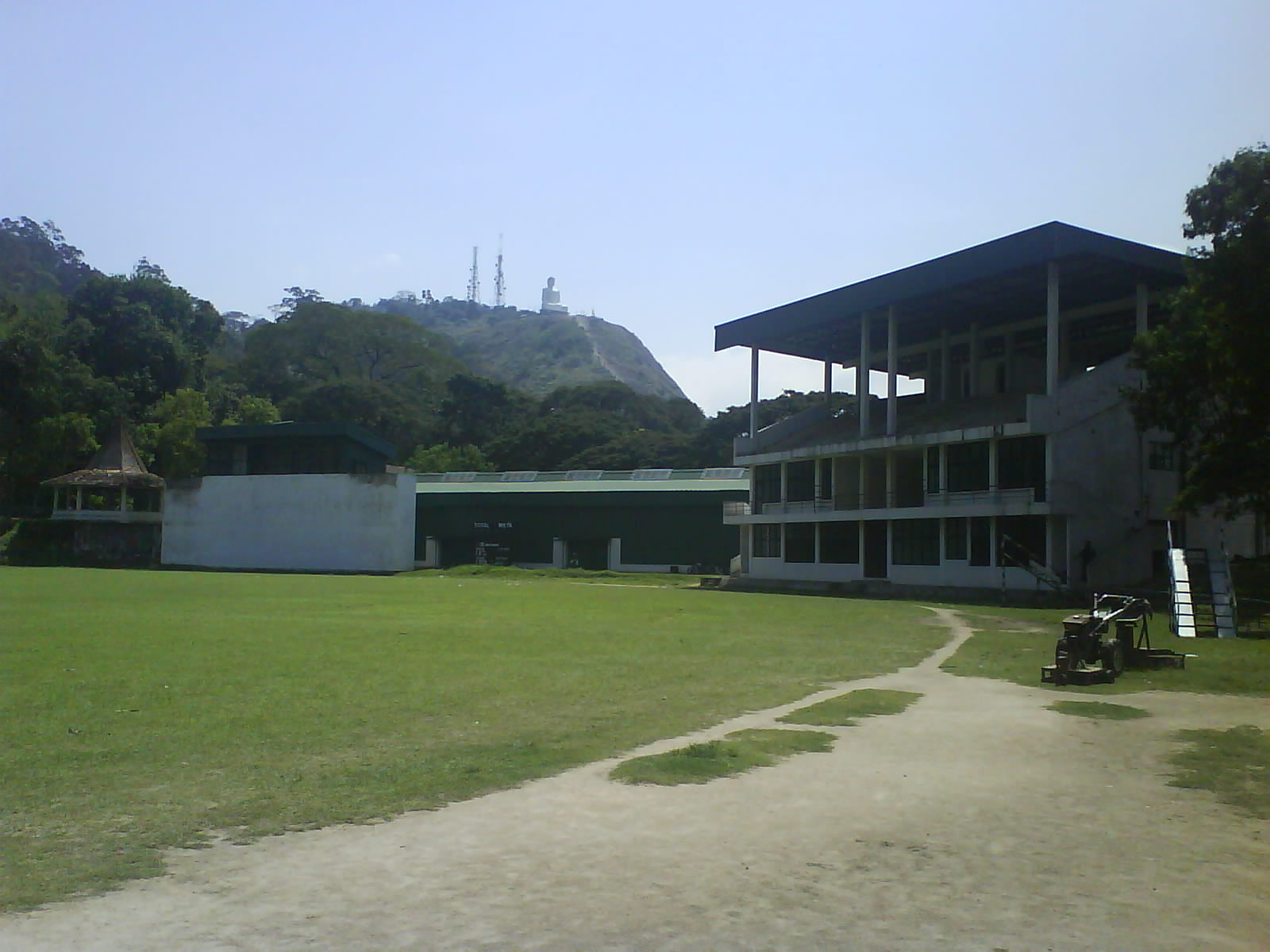
Welagedara Stadium in Kurunegala

Welagedara Stadium is a multi-use stadium in Kurunegala, in the North Western Province of Sri Lanka, which is situated about 100 km north east of Kandy. The stadium is currently used mostly for cricket matches and is the home ground of Wayamba cricket team. The stadium can hold at least 10,000 spectators. Since its wicket had been replaced from a matting wicket to a turf one it has become one of the best batting wickets in the country. It was officially declared open by the then Minister of Home Affairs, Justice Felix Dias Bandaranaike in 1972. Welagedara stadium hosted its first international match when Pakistan played there in 1985. In recent times it has regularly hosted international tour matches, unofficial test matches and U19 one-day games. The venue is an extremely picturesque one, with the giant 'Elephant Rock' forming a dramatic backdrop to the ground. It also has historic value being situated in an important location for when Kurunegala was an important Kingdom, King Bhuvanaikabahu VI, would address his subjects from the press box beneath the Elephant Rock. Even though it has a lot of amenities, the Welagedara Stadium is not going to be used for the 2012 SLPL tournament.

== Current squad ==
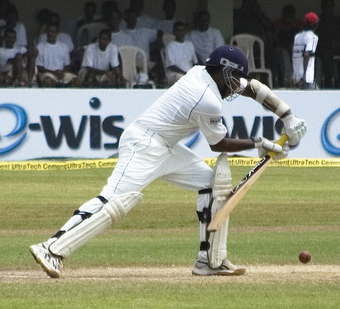
Sri Lankan batsman Mahela Jayawardene, the icon player of the franchise

Coach: Trevor Bayliss was named as the head of the franchise for the 2012 edition of the SLPL.

Players with international caps are listed in bold.

| No. | Name | Nat | Birth date | Batting style | Bowling style | Notes |
Batsmen
| 27 | **Mahela Jayawardene** | (Sri Lanka) | 27 May 1977 (age 48) | Right-handed | Right-arm medium | Captain |
| 23 | **Umar Akmal** | (Pakistan) | 26 May 1990 (age 35) | Right-handed | | |
| 28 | **Tamim Iqbal** | (Bangladesh) | 20 March 1989 (age 36) | Left-handed | | |
| – | Nimesh Perera - jnr | (Sri Lanka) | 9 January 1982 (age 43) | Right-handed | Right-arm medium | |
| – | **Colin Ingram** | (South Africa) | 3 July 1985 (age 40) | Left-handed | | |
All-rounders
| 11 | **Azhar Mahmood** | (Pakistan) | 28 February 1975 (age 50) | Right-handed | Right-arm fast-medium | |
| 12 | **Abdul Razzaq** | (Pakistan) | 2 December 1979 (age 46) | Right-handed | Right-arm fast-medium | |
| 34 | Milinda Siriwardana | (Sri Lanka) | 4 December 1985 (age 40) | Left-handed | Slow left arm orthodox | |
| 66 | **Kaushalya Weeraratne** | (Sri Lanka) | 29 January 1981 (age 44) | Left-handed | Right-arm medium-fast | |
| 88 | Shehan Jayasuriya | (Sri Lanka) | 12 September 1991 (age 34) | Left-handed | Right-arm off break | |
| 196 | **Mohammad Hafeez** | (Pakistan) | 17 October 1980 (age 45) | Right-handed | Slow left arm orthodox | |
| – | Malinda Pushpakumara | (Sri Lanka) | 24 March 1987 (age 38) | Right-handed | Slow left arm orthodox | |
| – | Dasun Shanaka | (Sri Lanka) | 9 September 1991 (age 34) | Right-handed | Right-arm medium | |
| – | **James Faulkner** | (Australia) | 29 April 1990 (age 35) | Right-handed | Left-arm medium | |
Wicket-keepers
| 8 | Kushal Janith Perera | (Sri Lanka) | 17 August 1990 (age 35) | Left-handed | | |
| 17 | **Dinesh Chandimal** | (Sri Lanka) | 18 November 1989 (age 36) | Right-handed | Right-arm off break | |
| 158 | **Kamran Akmal** | (Pakistan) | 13 January 1982 (age 43) | Right-handed | | |
Bowlers
| 10 | Akila Dananjaya | (Sri Lanka) | 4 October 1993 (age 32) | Left-handed | Right-arm off break | |
| 31 | **Brad Hogg** | (Australia) | 6 February 1971 (age 54) | Left-handed | Slow left-arm wrist-spin | |
| 67 | Chathuranga Kumara | (Sri Lanka) | 19 January 1992 (age 33) | Right-handed | Right-arm fast-medium | |
| 96 | **Isuru Udana** | (Sri Lanka) | 17 February 1988 (age 37) | Right-handed | Left-arm medium-fast | |
| – | Dilesh Gunaratne | (Sri Lanka) | 2 April 1989 (age 36) | Left-handed | Left-arm fast-medium | |
| – | **Suranga Lakmal** | (Sri Lanka) | 10 March 1987 (age 38) | Right-handed | Right-arm medium-fast | |
| – | Alankara Asanka Silva | (Sri Lanka) | 4 April 1985 (age 40) | Right-handed | Right-arm off break | |
| – | **Kemar Roach** | (Barbados) | 30 June 1988 (age 37) | Right-handed | Right-arm fast | |
| – | **Chaminda Vaas** | (Sri Lanka) | 27 January 1974 (age 51) | Left-handed | Left-arm fast-medium | |
