= Ruhuna Royals =

Cricket team

Personnel
- Captain: (Pakistan) Shahid Afridi
- Coach: (Pakistan) Waqar Younis
- Owner: Pearl Overseas Limited

Team information
- City: Southern Province
- Colors: Orange Purple Gold
- Founded: 2011 (as Ruhuna Rhinos)
- Dissolved: 2012
- Home ground: Mahinda Rajapaksha International Stadium
- Capacity: 35,000

History
- SLPL wins: none

Ruhuna Royals was a franchise cricket team that took part in Sri Lanka Premier League, representing Southern Province. Pearl Overseas Limited purchased the team for $4.6 million in 2012. They were owned for seven years, after which a new agreement may be negotiated. The team's current captain is Shahid Afridi.

== History ==
Star Pakistani all-rounder Shahid Afridi joined the franchise as Captain for the 2012 season after leaving Nagenahira Nagas over low payments. Pakistani fast-bowling legend Waqar Younis joined as the head coach of the franchise.

== Home ground ==
Galle International Stadium is a Cricket Stadium in Golden Galle It would be one of oldest venue in world cricket. Capacity 50,000 & beauty of sea & Odd Galle fort as well & Mahinda Rajapaksa International Stadium is a cricket stadium in Hambantota, Sri Lanka. It was built for the 2011 Cricket World Cup and hosted two matches, the first being Sri Lanka against Canada, on 20 February 2011. The stadium has a capacity of 34,300 people. The stadium won't be able host any matches for the 2012 edition of the SLPL as it is being renovated up to a capacity of 60,000 for the upcoming 2012 ICC World Twenty20.

== Current squad ==
Coach: Waqar Younis

Players with international caps are listed in bold.

No.	Name	Nat	Birth date	Batting style	Bowling style	Notes
Batsmen
5	**Chamara Silva**	(Sri Lanka)	14 December 1979 (age 46)	Right-handed	leg break	
8	Ramith Rambukwella	(Sri Lanka)	8 September 1991 (age 34)	Left-handed	Right-arm off break	
11	**Aaron Finch**	(Australia)	17 November 1986 (age 39)	Right-handed	Left-arm medium	
29	Daniel Harris	(Australia)	31 December 1979 (age 46)	Right-handed	Right-arm medium	
66	**Lahiru Thirimanne**	(Sri Lanka)	9 August 1989 (age 36)	Left-handed	Right-arm medium-fast	
–	**Nasir Jamshed**	(Pakistan)	6 December 1989 (age 36)	Left-handed	Right-arm off break	
–	**Mohammad Ashraful**	(Bangladesh)	7 July 1984 (age 42)	Right-handed	Right-arm leg break	
–	**Richard Levi**	(South Africa)	14 January 1988 (age 38)	Right-handed	Right-arm medium	
All-rounders
4	**Dilruwan Perera**	(Sri Lanka)	22 July 1982 (age 44)	Right-handed	Right-arm off break	
10	**Shahid Afridi**	(Pakistan)	1 March 1980 (age 46)	Right-handed	leg break googly	Captain
14	Shalika Karunanayake	(Sri Lanka)	14 February 1987 (age 39)	Right-handed	Right-arm fast-medium	
55	**Gihan Rupasinghe**	(Sri Lanka)	5 March 1986 (age 40)	Left-handed	leg break	
–	Shanuka Dissanayake	(Sri Lanka)	10 May 1977 (age 49)	Right-handed	Slow left arm orthodox	
–	**Nathan McCullum**	(New Zealand)	1 September 1980 (age 45)	Right-handed	Right-arm off break	
–	**Ryan McLaren**	(South Africa)	9 February 1983 (age 43)	Left-handed	Right-arm medium-fast	
–	**Gayan Wijekoon**	(Sri Lanka)	21 December 1976 (age 49)	Left-handed	Left-arm medium	
Wicket-keepers
59	**Prasanna Jayawardene**	(Sri Lanka)	9 October 1979 (age 46)	Right-handed		
–	Denuwan Rajakaruna	(Sri Lanka)	30 September 1990 (age 35)	Right-handed		
Bowlers
44	Dhananjaya de Silva	(Sri Lanka)	6 September 1991 (age 34)	Right-handed	Right-arm off break	
47	**Wahab Riaz**	(Pakistan)	28 June 1985 (age 41)	Right-handed	Left-arm fast	
75	**Jerome Taylor**	(Jamaica)	22 June 1984 (age 42)	Right-handed	Right-arm fast	
77	Tharanga Lakshitha	(Sri Lanka)	30 April 1982 (age 44)	Right-handed	Right-arm medium-fast	
99	**Lasith Malinga**	(Sri Lanka)	28 August 1983 (age 42)	Right-handed	Right-arm fast	
–	**Ryan Harris**	(Australia)	11 October 1979 (age 46)	Right-handed	Right-arm fast	
–	Chaminda Vidanapathirana	(Sri Lanka)	25 January 1983 (age 43)	Right-handed	Right-arm fast-medium	
–	Kasun Madushanka	(Sri Lanka)	16 July 1991 (age 35)	Right-handed	Right-arm fast-medium	
–	**Malinga Bandara**	(Sri Lanka)	31 December 1979 (age 46)	Right-handed	leg break	
–	Imran Khan	(Sri Lanka)	10 May 1992 (age 34)	Left-handed	Right-arm fast-medium	
