= Uthura Rudras =

Personnel
- Captain: Jehan Mubarak
- Coach: Tom Moody
- Owner: Rudra Sports Private Limited

Team information
- City: Dambulla
- Colors: Yellow and Brown
- Founded: 2011 (as Uthura Oryxes)
- Dissolved: 2012
- Home ground: Rangiri Dambulla International Stadium
- Capacity: 30,000

History
- Notable players: Shakib Al Hasan

The Uthura Rudras was a franchise cricket team that took part in Sri Lanka Premier League, representing Northern Province. Rudra Sports Private Limited purchased the team for $3.4 million in 2012. They were owned for seven years, after which a new agreement may be negotiated.

== History ==
This Team was previously known as Uthura Oryxes and was captained by Daniel Vettori.
