= Basnahira Cricket Dundee =

Personnel
- Captain: (Sri Lanka) Tillakaratne Dilshan
- Coach: (Sri Lanka) Duleep Mendis

Team information
- City: Colombo
- Founded: 2011 (as Basnahira Bears)
- Dissolved: 2012
- Home ground: R. Premadasa Stadium
- Capacity: 35,000

History
- SLPL wins: none

The Basnahira Cricket Dundee was a franchise cricket team that took part in Sri Lanka Premier League, representing Western Province. The Basnahira cricket team was based in Colombo. Indian Cricket Dundee Limited purchased the team for $4.33 million in 2012. They were owned for seven years, after which a new agreement could be negotiated.

== Current squad ==
Coach: Duleep Mendis

Players with international caps are listed in bold.

No.	Name	Nat	Birth date	Batting style	Bowling style	Notes
Batsmen
1	Cameron Borgas	(Australia)	1 September 1983 (age 42)	Right-handed	Right-arm off break	
3	**Dimuth Karunaratne**	(Sri Lanka)	21 April 1988 (age 37)	Left-handed	Right-arm medium	
7	**Brad Hodge**	(Australia)	29 December 1974 (age 51)	Right-handed	Right-arm off break	
21	Rilee Rossouw	(South Africa)	9 October 1989 (age 36)	Left-handed	Right arm off break	
–	Amal Athulathmudali	(Sri Lanka)	21 January 1987 (age 38)	Left-handed	Right-arm fast-medium	
–	Nadeera Nawela	(Sri Lanka)	4 October 1984 (age 41)	Right-handed	Right-arm fast-medium	
–	**Marlon Samuels**	(Jamaica)	5 January 1981 (age 45)	Right-handed	Right-arm off break	
All-rounders
34	**Jeevan Mendis**	(Sri Lanka)	15 January 1983 (age 42)	Left-handed	Leg break	
23	**Tillakaratne Dilshan**	(Sri Lanka)	14 October 1976 (age 49)	Right-handed	Right-arm off break	Captain
13	**Robin Peterson**	(South Africa)	4 August 1979 (age 46)	Left-handed	Slow left arm orthodox	
62	Sachithra Serasinghe	(Sri Lanka)	13 April 1987 (age 38)	Right-handed	Right-arm off break	
99	Dhanushka Gunathilleke	(Sri Lanka)	17 March 1991 (age 34)	Left-handed	Right-arm medium-fast	
–	Sanjaya Gangodawila	(Sri Lanka)	20 June 1984 (age 41)	Left-handed	Right-arm medium-fast	
–	Mahmudullah	(Bangladesh)	4 February 1986 (age 39)	Right-Handed	Right-arm off spin	
Wicket-keepers
13	Daniel Smith	(Australia)	17 March 1982 (age 43)	Right-handed		
77	**Indika de Saram**	(Sri Lanka)	2 September 1973 (age 52)	Right-handed	Right-arm off break	
Bowlers
14	**Rangana Herath**	(Sri Lanka)	19 March 1978 (age 47)	Left-handed	Slow left arm orthodox	
18	**Ishara Amerasinghe**	(Sri Lanka)	5 March 1978 (age 47)	Right-handed	Right-arm fast-medium	
19	**Nuwan Pradeep**	(Sri Lanka)	19 October 1986 (age 39)	Right-handed	Right-arm fast-medium	
26	**Dirk Nannes**	(Australia)	16 May 1976 (age 49)	Right-handed	Left-arm fast	
30	**Dhammika Prasad**	(Sri Lanka)	30 May 1983 (age 42)	Right-handed	Right-arm fast-medium	
67	**Charl Langeveldt**	(South Africa)	17 December 1974 (age 51)	Right-handed	Right-arm fast-medium	
69	Lahiru Jayaratne	(Sri Lanka)	12 October 1991 (age 34)	Right-handed	Right-arm medium-fast	
–	**Clint McKay**	(Australia)	22 February 1983 (age 42)	Right-handed	Right-arm fast-medium	
–	**Tim Southee**	(New Zealand)	11 December 1988 (age 37)	Right-handed	Right-arm medium-fast	
12	**Thilan Thushara**	(Sri Lanka)	1 March 1981 (age 44)	Left-handed	Left-arm fast-medium	
–	Rushan Jaleel	(Sri Lanka)	7 October 1990 (age 35)	Right-handed	Right-arm off break	
