= Nagenahira Nagas =

Personnel
- Captain: (Sri Lanka) Angelo Mathews
- Owner: Varun Beverages Lanka; Private Limited

Team information
- Founded: 2011
- Dissolved: 2012

The Nagenahira Nagas was a franchise cricket team that took part in Sri Lanka Premier League, representing Eastern Province. Varun Beverages Private Limited purchased the team for $3.22 million in 2012. They were owned for seven years, after which a new agreement may be negotiated. They named Pakistani all-rounder Shahid Afridi as their icon player in late June.

== History ==
Nagenahira was one of the franchises in the proposed inaugural Sri Lankan Premier League in 2011 and represents the Eastern Province. They signed Shahid Afridi as their captain but due to some issues, 2011's event was cancelled at the eleventh hour. In 2012, they were purchased at the lowest price of $3.22 million by Varun Beverages Lanka Private Limited. Initially Shahid Afridi was to lead the team as their icon player, but since his commitments to his national team made him unavailable for the latter part of the tournament, Sri Lankan all-rounder Angelo Mathews was named the icon player and the captain of the franchise.

== Current squad ==
Players with international caps are listed in bold.

No.	Name	Nat	Birth date	Batting style	Bowling style	Notes
5	**Udara Jayasundera**	(Sri Lanka)	3 January 1991 (age 35)	Left-handed	Leg break	
17	**Imran Nazir**	(Pakistan)	16 December 1981 (age 44)	Right-handed	Leg break	
19	**Ahmed Shehzad**	(Pakistan)	23 November 1991 (age 34)	Right-handed	Leg break	
27	**Angelo Perera**	(Sri Lanka)	23 February 1990 (age 36)	Right-handed	Slow left arm orthodox	
81	**Travis Birt**	(Australia)	9 December 1981 (age 44)	Left-handed	Right-arm medium	
–	**Nasir Hossain**	(Bangladesh)	30 November 1991 (age 34)	Right-handed	Right-arm off break	
All-rounders
10	**Sachith Pathirana**	(Sri Lanka)	21 March 1989 (age 37)	Left-handed	Slow left arm orthodox	
18	Tillakaratne Sampath	(Sri Lanka)	23 June 1982 (age 44)	Right-handed	Right-arm off break	
69	**Angelo Mathews**	(Sri Lanka)	2 June 1987 (age 39)	Right-handed	Right-arm fast-medium	Captain
22	**Colin de Grandhomme**	(New Zealand)	22 July 1986 (age 40)	Right-handed	Right-arm fast-medium	
–	**Mitchell Marsh**	(Australia)	20 October 1991 (age 34)	Right-handed	Right-arm medium	
–	Andy Solomons	(Sri Lanka)	18 September 1987 (age 38)	Right-handed	Right-arm fast-medium	
Wicket-keepers
15	**Mushfiqur Rahim**	(Bangladesh)	1 September 1988 (age 37)	Right-handed		Main wicket-keeper
–	Charith Sylvester	(Sri Lanka)	30 December 1982 (age 43)	Left-handed	Right-arm off break	
–	Gayan Maneshan	(Sri Lanka)	25 February 1991 (age 35)	Left-handed	Leg break	
Bowlers
16	**Dushmantha Chameera**	(Sri Lanka)	11 January 1992 (age 34)	Right-handed	Right-arm medium-fast	
32	**Shaminda Eranga**	(Sri Lanka)	23 June 1986 (age 40)	Right-handed	Right-arm medium-fast	
40	**Ajantha Mendis**	(Sri Lanka)	11 March 1985 (age 41)	Right-handed	Right-arm off break	
55	**Ben Laughlin**	(Australia)	3 October 1982 (age 43)	Right-handed	Right-arm fast-medium	
86	Kanishka Alvitigala	(Sri Lanka)	8 June 1986 (age 40)	Right-handed	Right-arm medium-fast	
88	**Suraj Randiv**	(Sri Lanka)	30 January 1985 (age 41)	Right-handed	Right-arm off break	
–	**Nuwan Kulasekara**	(Sri Lanka)	22 July 1982 (age 44)	Right-handed	Right-arm fast-medium	
–	**Sajeewa Weerakoon**	(Sri Lanka)	17 February 1978 (age 48)	Left-handed	Slow left arm orthodox	
–	**Elias Sunny**	(Bangladesh)	1 January 1986 (age 40)	Left-handed	Slow left arm orthodox	
–	Ishan Jayaratne	(Sri Lanka)	26 June 1989 (age 37)	Right-handed	Right-arm fast-medium	
