= Sri Lankan cricket team in India in 2009–10 =

International cricket tour

Sri Lanka cricket team in India
	India	Sri Lanka
- Dates: 11 November – 27 December 2009
Captains	Mahendra Singh Dhoni; Virender Sehwag (3rd & 4th ODIs)	Kumar Sangakkara

Test series
- Result: India won the 3-match series 2–0
Most runs	Virender Sehwag (491)	Mahela Jayawardene (373)
Most wickets	Harbhajan Singh (13)	Rangana Herath (11)
- Player of the series: Virender Sehwag (Ind)

One Day International series
- Results: India won the 5-match series 3–1
Most runs	Sachin Tendulkar (216)	Tillakaratne Dilshan (353)
Most wickets	Zaheer Khan (7)	Suraj Randiv (5); Chanaka Welegedara (5)
- Player of the series: Tillakaratne Dilshan (SL)

Twenty20 International series
- Results: 2-match series drawn 1–1
Most runs	Virender Sehwag (90)	Kumar Sangakkara (137)
Most wickets	Yuvraj Singh (3)	Sanath Jayasuriya (2); Angelo Mathews (2)
- Player of the series: Kumar Sangakkara (SL)

The Sri Lankan team toured India from 11 November to 27 December 2009, playing three Tests, five ODIs and two T20Is. The series was called the Jaypee cup.

== Squads ==
Tests		ODIs		T20Is	
India	Sri Lanka	India	Sri Lanka	India	Sri Lanka
MS Dhoni (c & wk); Virender Sehwag (vc); Gautam Gambhir; Rahul Dravid; Sachin Tendulkar; VVS Laxman; Yuvraj Singh; Murali Vijay; Subramaniam Badrinath; Harbhajan Singh; Zaheer Khan; Ishant Sharma; S. Sreesanth; Pragyan Ojha; Amit Mishra	Kumar Sangakkara (c & wk); Mahela Jayawardene (vc); Muttiah Muralitharan; Tillakaratne Dilshan; Tharanga Paranavitana; Thilan Samaraweera; Angelo Mathews; Thilina Kandamby; Prasanna Jayawardene (wk); Kaushal Silva; Chanaka Welegedara; Thilan Thushara; Nuwan Kulasekara; Dhammika Prasad; Rangana Herath; Ajantha Mendis	MS Dhoni (c & wk); Virender Sehwag (vc); Sachin Tendulkar; Gautam Gambhir; Yuvraj Singh; Suresh Raina; Virat Kohli; Dinesh Karthik (wk); Ravindra Jadeja; Harbhajan Singh; Zaheer Khan; Praveen Kumar; Ashish Nehra; S. Sreesanth; Pragyan Ojha; Sudeep Tyagi; Ashok Dinda	Kumar Sangakkara (c & wk); Mahela Jayawardene (vc); Muttiah Muralitharan; Sanath Jayasuriya; Tillakaratne Dilshan; Chamara Kapugedera; Thilina Kandamby; Upul Tharanga; Angelo Mathews; Thilan Samaraweera; Lasith Malinga; Dilhara Fernando; Thilan Thushara; Nuwan Kulasekara; Ajantha Mendis	MS Dhoni (c & wk); Yuvraj Singh (vc); Virender Sehwag; Gautam Gambhir; Suresh Raina; Rohit Sharma; Dinesh Karthik (wk); Yusuf Pathan; Virat Kohli; Ravichandran Ashwin; Ishant Sharma; Ashish Nehra; S. Sreesanth; Ashok Dinda; Sudeep Tyagi; Pragyan Ojha	Kumar Sangakkara (c & wk); Tillakaratne Dilshan (vc); Mahela Jayawardene; Muttiah Muralitharan; Sanath Jayasuriya; Chamara Kapugedera; Angelo Mathews; Chinthaka Jayasinghe; Kaushalya Weeraratne; Ajantha Mendis; Muthumudalige Pushpakumara; Chanaka Welegedara; Thilan Thushara; Lasith Malinga; Nuwan Kulasekara

== Tour matches ==
11–13 November

Indian Presidents XI	v	Sri Lanka

Match abandoned without a ball bowled
Bandra Kurla Complex, Mumbai
Umpires: Rajesh Deshpande (Ind) and Suresh Shastri (Ind)

== Test series ==
=== 1st Test ===
16–20 November
Scorecard

India	v	Sri Lanka
426 (104.5 overs); Rahul Dravid 177 (261); Chanaka Welegedara 4/87 (22 overs)		760/7d (202.4 overs); Mahela Jayawardene 275 (435); Zaheer Khan 2/109 (36 overs)
412/4 (129 overs); Gautam Gambhir 114 (230); Rangana Herath 2/97 (40 overs)

Match drawn
Sardar Patel Stadium, Motera, Ahmedabad
Umpires: Daryl Harper (Aus) and Tony Hill (NZ)
Player of the match: Mahela Jayawardene (SL)

- India won the toss and elected to bat.
- Rahul Dravid with his 177th run became the 2nd Indian & 5th overall to score 11,000 test runs
- Mahela Jayawardene & Prasanna Jayawardene's 351-run partnership was the highest score for a 6th wicket partnership. The record was broken in 2015 by BJ Watling and Kane Williamson
- Sachin Tendulkar with his 45th run in the 2nd innings scored 30000 international runs

=== 2nd Test ===
24–28 November
Scorecard

India	v	Sri Lanka
642 (154 overs); Gautam Gambhir 167 (215); Rangana Herath 5/121 (33 overs)		229 (84 overs); Mahela Jayawardene 47 (125); Sreesanth 5/75 (22 overs)
		269 (f/o) (65.3 overs); Thilan Samaraweera 78* (123); Harbhajan Singh 3/98 (22 overs)

India won by an innings and 144 runs.
Green Park, Kanpur
Umpires: Tony Hill (NZ) and Nigel Llong (Eng)
Player of the match: Sreesanth (Ind)

- India won the toss and elected to bat.
- This was India's 100th victory in Tests.
- Pragyan Ojha (Ind) made his Test debut

=== 3rd Test ===
2–6 December
Scorecard

Sri Lanka	v	India
393 (94.4 overs); Tillakaratne Dilshan 109 (160); Harbhajan Singh 4/112 (32 overs)		726/9d (163.3 overs); Virender Sehwag 293 (254); Muttiah Muralitharan 4/195 (51 overs)
309 (100.4 overs); Kumar Sangakkara 137 (261); Zaheer Khan 5/72 (21 overs)

India won by an innings and 24 runs
Brabourne Stadium, Mumbai
Umpires: Daryl Harper (Aus) and Nigel Llong (Eng)
Player of the match: Virender Sehwag (Ind)

- Sri Lanka won the toss and elected to bat.
- With this victory, India became the top team in ICC Test Rankings.
- Virender Sehwag selected as Man of the Series for his excellent batting performances.

== T20I series ==
=== 1st T20I ===
9 December
Scorecard

Sri Lanka; 215/5 (20 overs)	v	India; 186/9 (20 overs)
Kumar Sangakkara 78 (37); Rohit Sharma 1/22 (3 overs)		Gautam Gambhir 55 (26); Sanath Jayasuriya 2/19 (4 overs)

Sri Lanka won by 29 runs
Vidarbha Cricket Association Stadium, Nagpur
Umpires: Amish Saheba (Ind) & Shavir Tarapore (Ind)
Player of the match: Kumar Sangakkara (SL)

- India won the toss and elected to field.
- This was the first T20I played at this venue
- Ashish Nehra, Ashok Dinda (Ind) and Chinthaka Jayasinghe, Muthumudalige Pushpakumara (SL) made their T20I debuts.

=== 2nd T20I ===
12 December
Scorecard

Sri Lanka; 206/7 (20 overs)	v	India; 211/4 (19.1 overs)
Kumar Sangakkara 59 (31); Yuvraj Singh 3/23 (3 overs)		Virender Sehwag 64 (36); Lasith Malinga 1/28 (4 overs)

India won by 6 wickets
Punjab Cricket Association Stadium, Mohali, Chandigarh, Punjab
Umpires: Sanjay Hazare (Ind) & Shavir Tarapore (Ind)
Player of the match: Yuvraj Singh (Ind)

- Sri Lanka won the toss and elected to bat.
- This was the first T20I played at this venue.
- With 211/4, India recorded the highest successful chase in Twenty20 Internationals.
- Sudeep Tyagi (Ind) made his T20I debut.

== ODI series ==
=== 1st ODI ===
15 December
Scorecard

India; 414/7 (50 overs)	v	Sri Lanka; 411/8 (50 overs)
Virender Sehwag 146 (102); Chanaka Welegedara 2/63 (10 overs)		Tillakaratne Dilshan 160 (124); Harbhajan Singh 2/58 (10 overs)

India won by 3 runs.
Madhavrao Scindia Cricket Ground, Rajkot
Umpires: Marais Erasmus (SA) & Shavir Tarapore (Ind)
Player of the match: Virender Sehwag (Ind)

- Sri Lanka won the toss and elected to field
- This ODI match was only the second occasion where both the teams put up totals in excess of 400.
- Chanaka Welegedara (SL) made his ODI debut.

=== 2nd ODI ===
18 December
Scorecard

India; 301/7 (50 overs)	v	Sri Lanka; 302/7 (49.1 overs)
Mahendra Singh Dhoni 107 (111); Suraj Randiv 3/51 (10 overs)		Tillakaratne Dilshan 123 (113); Zaheer Khan 3/63 (10 overs)

Sri Lanka won by 3 wickets.
Vidarbha Cricket Association Stadium, Nagpur
Umpires: Marais Erasmus (SA) & Shavir Tarapore (Ind)
Player of the match: Tillakaratne Dilshan (SL)

- India won the toss and elected to bat
- Suranga Lakmal and Suraj Randiv (SL) both made their ODI debuts.

=== 3rd ODI ===
21 December
Scorecard

Sri Lanka; 239 (44.2 overs)	v	India; 243/3 (42.4 overs)
Upul Tharanga 73 (81); Ravindra Jadeja 4/32 (10 overs)		Sachin Tendulkar 96* (104); Chanaka Welegedara 2/35 (8 overs)

India won by 7 wickets.
Barabati Stadium, Cuttack
Umpires: Marais Erasmus (SA) & Sanjay Hazare (Ind)
Player of the match: Ravindra Jadeja (Ind)

- Sri Lanka won the toss and elected to bat.
- India was captained by Virender Sehwag in the absence of MS Dhoni, who was banned for two matches for a slow over-rate

=== 4th ODI ===
24 December
Scorecard

Sri Lanka; 315/6 (50 overs)	v	India; 317/3 (48.1 overs)
Upul Tharanga 118 (128); Zaheer Khan 2/49 (10 overs)		Gautam Gambhir 150* (137); Suranga Lakmal 2/55 (10 overs)

India won by 7 wickets.
Eden Gardens, Kolkata
Umpires: Marais Erasmus (SA) & Sanjay Hazare (Ind)
Player of the match: Gautam Gambhir (Ind)

- Sri Lanka won the toss and elected to bat.
- India was captained by Virender Sehwag in the absence of MS Dhoni, who was banned for two matches for a slow over-rate
- Gautam Gambhir was adjudged man of the match but he gave the award to Virat Kohli as it was maiden century in ODIs.
- Virat Kohli (Ind) scored his first century in ODIs.
- Thisara Perera (SL) made his ODI debut.

=== 5th ODI ===
27 December
Scorecard

Sri Lanka; 83/5 (23.3 overs)	v	India
Sanath Jayasuriya 31 (51); Zaheer Khan 2/31 (8 overs)

Match abandoned due to unfit playing conditions
Arun Jaitley Stadium, Delhi
Umpires: Marais Erasmus (SA) & Shavir Tarapore (Ind)

- India won the toss and elected to field.
- Sudeep Tyagi (Ind) and Muthumudalige Pushpakumara (SL) made their ODI debuts.

== Television coverage ==
- Eurosport (live) – Europe
- Fox Sports (live) – Australia
- NEO Cricket (live) – India and Middle East
- StarHub TV (live) – Singapore and Malaysia
- Supersport (live) – South Africa
- Zee Sports (live) – US
- DD National (live) – India (Only T20s and ODIs)
- Geo Super (live) – Pakistan
