= Sri Lankan cricket team against Pakistan in the UAE in 2011–12 =

International cricket tour

Pakistani cricket team vs Sri Lanka in the UAE in 2011
	Pakistan	Sri Lanka
- Dates: 18 October 2011 – 25 November 2011
Captains	Misbah-ul-Haq	Tillakaratne Dilshan

Test series
- Result: Pakistan won the 3-match series 1–0
Most runs	Taufeeq Umar (324)	Kumar Sangakkara (516)
Most wickets	Saeed Ajmal (18)	Chanaka Welegedara (11)
- Player of the series: Saeed Ajmal (Pak) and Kumar Sangakkara (SL)

One Day International series
- Results: Pakistan won the 5-match series 4–1
Most runs	Umar Akmal (161)	Kumar Sangakkara (191)
Most wickets	Shahid Afridi (13)	Lasith Malinga (7)
- Player of the series: Shahid Afridi (Pak)

Twenty20 International series
- Results: Pakistan won the 1-match series 1–0
Most runs	Misbah-ul-Haq (48)	Dinesh Chandimal (56)
Most wickets	Aizaz Cheema (4)	Tillakaratne Dilshan (1)
- Player of the series: Aizaz Cheema (Pak)

The Sri Lanka cricket team and Pakistani cricket team toured UAE from 18 October to 25 November 2011. The tour included three Tests, five One Day Internationals (ODIs) and one T20I between Sri Lanka and Pakistan.

== Squads ==
Tests		ODIs		T20	
Pakistan	Sri Lanka	Pakistan	Sri Lanka	Pakistan	Sri Lanka
Misbah-ul-Haq (c); Abdur Rehman; Adnan Akmal (wk); Aizaz Cheema; Asad Shafiq; Imran Farhat; Junaid Khan; Mohammad Hafeez; Saeed Ajmal; Azhar Ali; Shoaib Malik; Taufeeq Umar; Umar Gul; Wahab Riaz; Younis Khan	Tillakaratne Dilshan (c); Angelo Mathews (vc); Prasanna Jayawardene (wk); Shaminda Eranga; Nuwan Pradeep; Rangana Herath; Mahela Jayawardene; Dinesh Chandimal; Suraj Randiv; Suranga Lakmal; Tharanga Paranavitana; Dammika Prasad; Kumar Sangakkara (wk); Kaushal Silva; Lahiru Thirimanne; Chanaka Welegedara	Misbah-ul-Haq (c); Abdur Rehman; Abdul Razzaq; Aizaz Cheema; Asad Shafiq; Imran Farhat; Junaid Khan; Mohammad Hafeez; Saeed Ajmal; Sarfraz Ahmed (wk); Shoaib Malik; Shahid Afridi; Umar Gul; Sohail Tanvir; Younis Khan; Umar Akmal	Tillakaratne Dilshan (c); Angelo Mathews (vc); Dinesh Chandimal; Dilhara Fernando; Mahela Jayawardene; Suraj Randiv; Dimuth Karunaratne; Kosala Kulasekara; Suranga Lakmal; Lasith Malinga; Jeevan Mendis; Thisara Perera; Seekkuge Prasanna; Kumar Sangakkara (wk); Upul Tharanga; Dhammika Prasad	Misbah-ul-Haq (c); Abdur Rehman; Abdul Razzaq; Aizaz Cheema; Asad Shafiq; Imran Farhat; Junaid Khan; Mohammad Hafeez; Saeed Ajmal; Sarfraz Ahmed (wk); Shoaib Malik; Shahid Afridi; Umar Gul; Sohail Tanvir; Younis Khan; Umar Akmal	Tillakaratne Dilshan (c); Angelo Mathews (vc); Dinesh Chandimal; Dilhara Fernando; Mahela Jayawardene; Suraj Randiv; Dimuth Karunaratne; Kosala Kulasekara; Kumar Sangakkara (wk); Lasith Malinga; Jeevan Mendis; Thisara Perera; Seekkuge Prasanna; Chanaka Welegedara; Upul Tharanga; Suranga Lakmal; Dhammika Prasad

== Test series ==
=== 1st Test ===
18–22 October 2011
Scorecard

Sri Lanka	v	Pakistan
197 (74.1 overs); Angelo Mathews 52* (99); Junaid Khan 5/38 (14.1 overs)		511/6d (174.4 overs); Taufeeq Umar 236 (496); Rangana Herath 3/126 (61.4 overs)
483 (168 overs); Kumar Sangakkara 211 (431); Umar Gul 4/64 (25 overs)		21/1 (10 overs); Mohammad Hafeez 12* (31); Chanaka Welegedara 1/9 (5 overs)

Match Drawn
Sheikh Zayed Cricket Stadium, Abu Dhabi
Umpires: Tony Hill (NZ) and Rod Tucker (Aus)
Player of the match: Kumar Sangakkara (SL)

- Pakistan won the toss and elected to field
- Nuwan Pradeep (Sri Lanka) made his test debut.

=== 2nd Test ===
26–30 October 2011
Scorecard

Sri Lanka	v	Pakistan
239 (79 overs); Kumar Sangakkara 78 (122); Saeed Ajmal 3/45 (26 overs)		403 (141.1 overs); Azhar Ali 100 (242); Tillakaratne Dilshan 3/57 (19.1 overs)
257 (109.5 overs); Tharanga Paranavitana 72 (239); Saeed Ajmal 5/68 (30.5 overs)		94/1 (24.1 overs); Mohammad Hafeez 59* (64); Rangana Herath 1/29 (10.1 overs)

Pakistan won by 9 wickets
Dubai International Cricket Stadium, Dubai
Umpires: Tony Hill (NZ) and Shavir Tarapore (Ind)
Player of the match: Saeed Ajmal (Pak)

- Sri Lanka won the toss and elected to bat

=== 3rd Test ===
3–7 November 2011
Scorecard

Sri Lanka	v	Pakistan
413 (153.3 overs); Kumar Sangakkara 144 (344); Saeed Ajmal 4/132 (51 overs)		340 (138.2 overs); Younis Khan 122 (211); Chanaka Welegedara 5/87 (35.2 overs)
181/6d (58 overs); Tharanga Paranavitana 76* (168); Saeed Ajmal 3/50 (16 overs)		87/4 (57 overs); Taufeeq Umar 39 (121); Rangana Herath 1/19 (22 overs)

Match drawn
Sharjah Cricket Association Stadium, Sharjah
Umpires: Shavir Tarapore (Ind) and Simon Taufel (Aus)
Player of the match: Kumar Sangakkara (SL)

- Sri Lanka won the toss and elected to bat
- Play started late on Day 5 due to unexpected rain in Sharjah
- Pakistan won the 3-match series 1-0

== ODI series ==
=== 1st ODI ===
11 November 2011
15:00 (D/N)
Scorecard

Sri Lanka; 131 (40.3 overs)	v	Pakistan; 132/2 (21.5 overs)
Dinesh Chandimal 28 (31); Shahid Afridi 3/27 (9.3 overs)		Younis Khan 56* (57); Suranga Lakmal 2/16 (4 overs)

Pakistan won by 8 wickets
Dubai International Cricket Stadium, Dubai
Umpires: Marais Erasmus (SA) and Ahsan Raza (Pak)
Player of the match: Shahid Afridi (Pak)

- Sri Lanka won the toss and elected to bat

=== 2nd ODI ===
14 November 2011
15:00 (D/N)
Scorecard

Sri Lanka; 235/7 (50 overs)	v	Pakistan; 210 (46.3 overs)
Upul Tharanga 77 (120); Saeed Ajmal 3/61 (10 overs)		Umar Akmal 91 (102); Lasith Malinga 3/36 (9 overs)

Sri Lanka won by 25 runs
Dubai International Cricket Stadium, Dubai
Umpires: Richard Illingworth (Eng) and Zameer Haider (Pak)
Player of the match: Lasith Malinga (SL)

- Sri Lanka won the toss and elected to bat

=== 3rd ODI ===
18 November 2011
15:00 (D/N)
Scorecard

Pakistan; 257/8 (50 overs)	v	Sri Lanka; 236 (48.5 overs)
Mohammad Hafeez 83 (101); Seekkuge Prasanna 2/39 (9 overs)		Tillakaratne Dilshan 64 (78); Saeed Ajmal 3/42(10 overs)

Pakistan won by 21 runs
Dubai International Cricket Stadium, Dubai
Umpires: Marais Erasmus (SA) and Ahsan Raza (Pak)
Player of the match: Mohammad Hafeez (Pakistan)

- Pakistan won the toss and elected to bat

=== 4th ODI ===
20 November 2011
15:00 (D/N)
Scorecard

Pakistan; 200 (49.3 overs)	v	Sri Lanka; 174 (45.2 overs)
Shahid Afridi 75 (65); Dilhara Fernando 3/26 (10 overs)		Mahela Jayawardene 55 (87); Shahid Afridi 5/35 (9.2 overs)

Pakistan won by 26 runs
Sharjah Cricket Association Stadium, Sharjah
Umpires: Richard Illingworth (Eng) and Zameer Haider (Pak)
Player of the match: Shahid Afridi (Pakistan)

- Pakistan won the toss and elected to bat
- Pakistani all-rounder Shahid Afridi made a half-century and picked up 5 wickets, to become the only player in ODI history to perform this feat twice.

=== 5th ODI ===
23 November 2011
15:00 (D/N)
Scorecard

Sri Lanka; 218/9 (50 overs)	v	Pakistan; 219/7 (47.2 overs)
Kumar Sangakkara 78 (100); Sohail Tanvir 3/34 (7 overs)		Misbah-ul-Haq 66 (99); Jeevan Mendis 3/36 (7 overs)

Pakistan won by 3 wickets
Sheikh Zayed Stadium, Abu Dhabi
Umpires: Marais Erasmus (SA) and Ahsan Raza (Pak)
Player of the match: Umar Akmal (Pak)

- Sri Lanka won the toss and elected to bat

== T20I Series ==
=== Only T20I ===
25 November 2011
20:00 (D/N)
Scorecard

Sri Lanka; 141 (19.3 overs)	v	Pakistan; 142/5 (19.3 overs)
Dinesh Chandimal 56 (44); Aizaz Cheema 4/30 (4 overs)		Misbah-ul-Haq* 48 (38); Tillakaratne Dilshan 1/8 (2 overs)

Pakistan won by 5 wickets
Sheikh Zayed Stadium, Abu Dhabi
Umpires: Ahsan Raza (Pak), Zameer Haider (Pak)
Player of the match: Aizaz Cheema (Pak)

- Sri Lanka won the toss and chose to bat.
