= Sri Lankan cricket team in England in 2011 =

	Sri Lanka	England
- Dates: 14 May – 9 July 2011
Captains	Tillakaratne Dilshan (1st and 2nd Tests, ODIs); Kumar Sangakkara (3rd Test); Thilina Kandamby (T20I)	Andrew Strauss (Tests); Stuart Broad (T20I); Alastair Cook (ODIs)

Test series
- Result: England won the 3-match series 1–0
Most runs	Tillakaratne Dilshan (253)	Alastair Cook (390)
Most wickets	Chris Tremlett (15)	Chanaka Welegedara (7)
- Player of the series: Prasanna Jayawardene (SL) and Chris Tremlett (Eng)

One Day International series
- Results: England won the 5-match series 3–2
Most runs	Mahela Jayawardene (246)	Alastair Cook (298)
Most wickets	Suraj Randiv (9)	James Anderson (9)
- Player of the series: Alastair Cook (Eng)

Twenty20 International series
- Results: Sri Lanka won the 1-match series 1–0
Most runs	Mahela Jayawardene (72)	Eoin Morgan (47)
Most wickets	Jade Dernbach (1)	Lasith Malinga (2)
- Player of the series: Mahela Jayawardene (SL)

The Sri Lankan cricket team toured England from 14 May to 9 July 2011. The tour consisted of three Tests, one Twenty20 International (T20I) and five One Day Internationals (ODIs) between Sri Lanka and England.

== Squads ==
Tests		Limited overs	
England	Sri Lanka	England	Sri Lanka
Andrew Strauss (c); Alastair Cook (vc); Ian Bell; Stuart Broad; James Anderson; Jade Dernbach; Steven Finn; Eoin Morgan; Kevin Pietersen; Matt Prior (wk); Graeme Swann; Chris Tremlett; Jonathan Trott	Tillakaratne Dilshan (c) – 1st & 2nd Tests; Kumar Sangakkara (c) – 3rd Test; Nuwan Pradeep; Dilhara Fernando; Rangana Herath; Mahela Jayawardene; Prasanna Jayawardene (wk); Suraj Randiv; Suranga Lakmal; Farveez Maharoof; Ajantha Mendis; Tharanga Paranavitana; Thisara Perera; Thilan Samaraweera; Dinesh Chandimal; Kaushal Silva; Lahiru Thirimanne; Chanaka Welegedara	Stuart Broad (c) – T20I; Alastair Cook (c) – ODIs; James Anderson; Ian Bell; Ravi Bopara; Tim Bresnan (ODI only); Jade Dernbach; Steven Finn; Craig Kieswetter (wk); Michael Lumb (T20I only); Eoin Morgan; Samit Patel; Kevin Pietersen; Graeme Swann; Jonathan Trott; Chris Woakes; Luke Wright	Tillakaratne Dilshan (c) – ODIs; Thilina Kandamby (c) – T20I, (vc) – ODIs; Dinesh Chandimal; Sanath Jayasuriya; Mahela Jayawardene; Suraj Randiv; Dimuth Karunaratne; Nuwan Kulasekara; Suranga Lakmal; Lasith Malinga; Angelo Mathews; Ajantha Mendis; Jeevan Mendis; Thisara Perera; Dhammika Prasad; Kumar Sangakkara (wk)

== Tour matches ==
=== First-class: Middlesex vs Sri Lankans ===
14–16 May
Scorecard

Middlesex	v	Sri Lankans
360/8 (100 overs); Andrew Strauss 151 (223); Rangana Herath 2/67 (22 overs)		309/2d (69 overs); Tillakaratne Dilshan 123 (134)
161 (48.5 overs); Dawid Malan 34 (41); Ajantha Mendis 3/28 (9.5 overs)		216/6 (44 overs); Thilan Samaraweera 49 (66); Tom Smith 2/45 (8 overs)

Sri Lankans won by 4 wickets
Uxbridge Cricket Club Ground, Uxbridge
Umpires: Jeff Evans (Eng) and Andy Hicks (Eng)

- Middlesex won the toss and elected to bat.

=== First-class: England Lions vs Sri Lankans ===
19–22 May
Scorecard

England Lions	v	Sri Lankans
493/8d (109 overs); Eoin Morgan 193 (226); Thisara Perera 3/88 (22 overs)		266 (63.4 overs); Suraj Randiv 76* (122); Jade Dernbach 5/44 (13.4 overs)
183 (47.3 overs); James Hildreth 38 (57); Nuwan Pradeep 4/29 (10 overs)		448 (f/o) (104.4 overs); Tharanga Paranavitana 125 (216); Jade Dernbach 4/94 (24.4 overs)

Sri Lankans won by 38 runs
County Ground, Derby
Umpires: Peter Hartley (Eng) and Tim Robinson (Eng)

- Sri Lankans won the toss and elected to field.

=== First class: Essex vs Sri Lankans ===
10–12 June
Scorecard

Sri Lankans	v	Essex
337/9d (90.4 overs); Kumar Sangakkara 153 (202); Reece Topley 4/23 (13.4 overs)		351 (73.4 overs); Ryan ten Doeschate 164 (174); Suraj Randiv 4/76 (18 overs)
38/3 (15 overs); Kumar Sangakkara 19* (41); Reece Topley 2/11 (8 overs)

Match drawn
County Ground, Chelmsford
Umpires: Paul Baldwin (Eng) and Steve O'Shaughnessy (Eng)

- Sri Lankans won the toss and elected to bat.

=== List A: Worcestershire Royals vs Sri Lankans ===
22 June
Scorecard

Sri Lankans; 351/5 (50 overs)	v	Worcestershire Royals; 294 (43.2 overs)
Jeevan Mendis 99* (71); Saeed Ajmal 3/42 (10 overs)		Moeen Ali 136 (90); Lasith Malinga 3/25 (6.2 overs)

Sri Lankans won by 57 runs
New Road, Worcester
Umpires: Nick Cook (Eng) and Graham Lloyd (Eng)

- Sri Lankans won the toss and elected to bat.

== Test series ==
=== 1st Test ===
26–30 May
Scorecard

Sri Lanka	v	England
400 (118.4 overs); Prasanna Jayawardene 112 (168); James Anderson 3/66 (28 overs)		496/5d (155 overs); Jonathan Trott 203 (409); Ajantha Mendis 1/66 (21 overs)
82 (24.4 overs); Thisara Perera 20 (17); Graeme Swann 4/16 (7 overs)

England won by an innings and 14 runs
Sophia Gardens, Cardiff
Umpires: Aleem Dar (Pak) and Billy Doctrove (WI)
Player of the match: Jonathan Trott (Eng)

- Sri Lanka won the toss and elected to bat.
- Play on Day 1 was reduced to 48 overs, play on Day 3 was reduced to 70 overs and play on Day 4 was reduced to 63 overs due to rain. Start of Day 5 delayed due to rain.

Jonathan Trott's score of 203 is the highest score by an English batsman against Sri Lanka, beating the previous score of 174 set by Graham Gooch in 1991. Sri Lanka's second innings total of 82 was their fifth-lowest Test total. Thisara Perera made his Test debut for Sri Lanka in this game.

=== 2nd Test ===
3–7 June
Scorecard

England	v	Sri Lanka
486 (112.5 overs); Matt Prior 126 (131); Chanaka Welegedara 4/122 (28 overs)		479 (131.4); Tillakaratne Dilshan 193 (253); Steven Finn 4/108 (33 overs)
335/7d (78.1 overs); Alastair Cook 106 (231); Rangana Herath 3/87 (24 overs)		127/3 (43 overs); Tharanga Paranavitana 44 (86); Jonathan Trott 1/5 (4 overs)

Match drawn
Lord's, London
Umpires: Billy Doctrove (WI) and Rod Tucker (Aus)
Player of the match: Tillakaratne Dilshan (SL)

- Sri Lanka won the toss and elected to field.

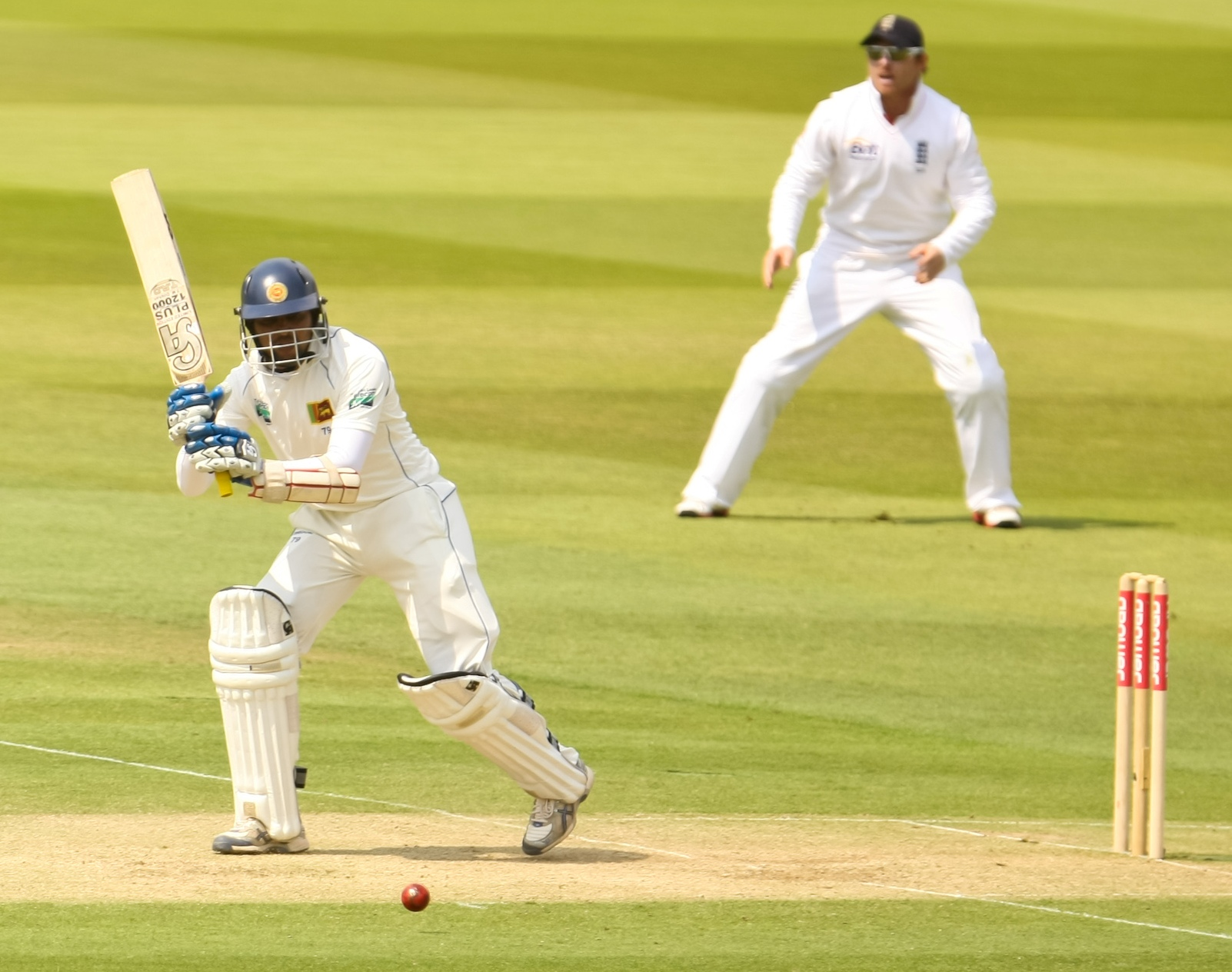
Tillakaratne Dilshan batting during his innings of 193 at Lord's in June 2011.

On the opening day, England's batsmen were reduced to 22 for 3, before battling back to finish the day on 342 for 6. This included a record stand for the sixth wicket against Sri Lanka, when Eoin Morgan and Matt Prior made 101 runs. Sri Lankan captain Tillakaratne Dilshan score of 193 was the highest score made by a Sri Lankan at Lord's and Dilshan's highest Test Match score. Dilshan also suffered a broken thumb from a delivery on the third day by Chris Tremlett that caused him to miss the Third Test. England wicketkeeper Matt Prior was reprimanded by the International Cricket Council for breaking a window in the dressing room after he was run out.

=== 3rd Test ===
16–20 June
Scorecard

Sri Lanka	v	England
184 (64.2 overs); Prasanna Jayawardene 43 (104); Chris Tremlett 6/48 (20 overs)		377/8d (92.4 overs); Ian Bell 119* (169); Suranga Lakmal 3/99 (24.2 overs)
334/5 (104 overs); Kumar Sangakkara 119 (249); James Anderson 2/81 (30 overs)

Match drawn
The Rose Bowl, Southampton
Umpires: Aleem Dar (Pak) and Rod Tucker (Aus)
Player of the match: Chris Tremlett (Eng)

- England won the toss and elected to field.

This was the first ever Test match to be played at The Rose Bowl. Sri Lankan batsman Lahiru Thirimanne made his Test Match debut. Chris Tremlett made his best Test figures to date with 6 for 48.

== T20I series ==
=== Only T20I ===
25 June
Scorecard

England; 136/9 (20 overs)	v	Sri Lanka; 137/1 (17.2 overs)
Eoin Morgan 47 (32); Lasith Malinga 2/15 (4 overs)		Mahela Jayawardene 72* (57); Jade Dernbach 1/18 (3 overs)

Sri Lanka won by 9 wickets
County Ground, Bristol
Umpires: Richard Kettleborough (Eng) and Nigel Llong (Eng)
Player of the match: Mahela Jayawardene (SL)

- Sri Lanka won the toss and elected to field.
- It was the last T20I for Sanath Jayasuriya (Sri).

== ODI series ==
=== 1st ODI ===
28 June
Scorecard

England; 229/8 (32 overs)	v	Sri Lanka; 121 (27 overs)
Craig Kieswetter 61 (56); Lasith Malinga 3/40 (7 overs)		Lasith Malinga 26 (15); James Anderson 4/18 (5 overs)

England won by 110 runs (D/L)
Kennington Oval, London
Umpires: Billy Bowden (NZ) and Richard Illingworth (Eng)
Player of the match: James Anderson (Eng)

- Sri Lanka won the toss and elected to field.
- Match reduced to 32 overs each due to rain.
- Sanath Jayasuriya (Sri) played his final international match.

=== 2nd ODI ===
1 July
Scorecard

Sri Lanka; 309/5 (50 overs)	v	England; 240 (45.5 overs)
Mahela Jayawardene 144 (150); Graeme Swann 2/42 (10 overs)		Eoin Morgan 52 (40); Suranga Lakmal 3/43 (7.5 overs)

Sri Lanka won by 69 runs
Headingley, Leeds
Umpires: Billy Bowden (NZ) and Richard Kettleborough (Eng)
Player of the match: Mahela Jayawardene (SL)

- England won the toss and elected to field.

=== 3rd ODI ===
3 July
Scorecard

England; 246/7 (50 overs)	v	Sri Lanka; 249/4 (48.2 overs)
Alastair Cook 119 (143); Jeevan Mendis 2/40 (10 overs)		Dinesh Chandimal 105* (126); Graeme Swann 2/32 (10 overs)

Sri Lanka won by 6 wickets
Lord's, London
Umpires: Billy Bowden (NZ) and Nigel Llong (Eng)
Player of the match: Dinesh Chandimal (SL)

- England won the toss and elected to bat.

=== 4th ODI ===
6 July
Scorecard

Sri Lanka; 174 (43.4 overs)	v	England; 171/0 (23.5 overs)
Kumar Sangakkara 75 (107); James Anderson 3/24 (8 overs)		Alastair Cook 95* (75)

England won by 10 wickets (D/L)
Trent Bridge, Nottingham
Umpires: Billy Bowden (NZ) and Richard Illingworth (Eng)
Player of the match: Alastair Cook (Eng)

- England won the toss and elected to field.
- Match reduced to 48 overs each due to rain.

=== 5th ODI ===
9 July
Scorecard

England; 268/9 (50 overs)	v	Sri Lanka; 252 (48.2 overs)
Jonathan Trott 72 (87); Suraj Randiv 5/42 (10 overs)		Angelo Mathews 62 (64); Tim Bresnan 3/49 (9 overs)

England won by 16 runs
Old Trafford, Manchester
Umpires: Billy Bowden (NZ) and Nigel Llong (Eng)
Player of the match: Jonathan Trott (Eng)

- England won the toss and elected to bat.
