= Pakistani cricket team in Sri Lanka in 2015 =

International cricket tour

	Sri Lanka	Pakistan
- Dates: 11 June 2015 – 1 August 2015
Captains	Angelo Mathews (Tests, ODIs); Lasith Malinga (T20Is)	Misbah-ul-Haq (Tests); Azhar Ali (ODIs); Shahid Afridi (T20Is)

Test series
- Result: Pakistan won the 3-match series 2–1
Most runs	Dimuth Karunaratne (318)	Younis Khan (267)
Most wickets	Dhammika Prasad (14)	Yasir Shah (24)
- Player of the series: Yasir Shah (Pak)

One Day International series
- Results: Pakistan won the 5-match series 3–2
Most runs	Kusal Perera (230)	Mohammad Hafeez (273)
Most wickets	Lasith Malinga (4)	Rahat Ali (9)
- Player of the series: Mohammad Hafeez (Pak)

Twenty20 International series
- Results: Pakistan won the 2-match series 2–0
Most runs	Chamara Kapugedera (79)	Shoaib Malik (54)
Most wickets	Thisara Perera (3); Binura Fernando (3)	Sohail Tanvir (4)
- Player of the series: Shoaib Malik (Pak)

The Pakistan cricket team toured Sri Lanka from 11 June to 1 August 2015. The tour consisted of a three-day tour match against a SLCB President's XI, three Test matches, five One Day International and two Twenty20 International matches. The third Test was originally scheduled to be played at the R Premadasa Stadium, but was changed to the Pallekele International Cricket Stadium in early May.

Pakistan outplayed the hosts in all forms of the game by winning the Test series 2–1, the ODI series 3–2 and the T20I series 2–0.

== Squads ==
Tests		ODIs		T20I	
Sri Lanka	Pakistan	Sri Lanka	Pakistan	Sri Lanka	Pakistan
Angelo Mathews (c); Lahiru Thirimanne (vc); Kaushal Silva; Dimuth Karunaratne; Kumar Sangakkara; Dinesh Chandimal; Kithuruwan Vithanage; Jehan Mubarak; Kusal Perera; Rangana Herath; Dilruwan Perera; Tharindu Kaushal; Nuwan Pradeep; Dhammika Prasad; ~~Dushmantha Chameera~~; Suranga Lakmal; Upul Tharanga; Lahiru Gamage	Misbah-ul-Haq (c); Azhar Ali (vc); Mohammad Hafeez; Ahmed Shehzad; Shan Masood; Younis Khan; Asad Shafiq; ~~Haris Sohail~~; Babar Azam; Sarfaraz Ahmed; Yasir Shah; Zulfiqar Babar; ~~Wahab Riaz~~; Junaid Khan; Imran Khan; Ehsan Adil; Rahat Ali	Angelo Mathews (c); Dinesh Chandimal; Tillakaratne Dilshan; Suranga Lakmal; Lasith Malinga; Sachith Pathirana; Kusal Perera; Thisara Perera; ~~Nuwan Pradeep~~; Seekkuge Prasanna; Ashan Priyanjan; Sachithra Senanayake; Milinda Siriwardana; Upul Tharanga; Lahiru Thirimanne; Lahiru Gamage	Azhar Ali (c); Sarfaraz Ahmed (vc); Ehsan Adil; Mukhtar Ahmed; Anwar Ali; Rahat Ali; Bilal Asif; Babar Azam; Mohammad Hafeez; Mohammad Irfan; Shoaib Malik; Mohammad Rizwan; Asad Shafiq; Yasir Shah; Ahmed Shehzad; Imad Wasim	Lasith Malinga (c); Tillakaratne Dilshan; Binura Fernando; Shehan Jayasuriya; Chamara Kapugedera; Nuwan Kulasekara; Angelo Mathews; Kusal Perera; Thisara Perera; Dasun Shanaka; Chaturanga de Silva; Dhananjaya de Silva; Milinda Siriwardana; Jeffrey Vandersay; Kithruwan Vithanage	Shahid Afridi (c); Mukhtar Ahmed; Sarfaraz Ahmed; Umar Akmal; Anwar Ali; Nauman Anwar; Mohammad Hafeez; Mohammad Irfan; Shoaib Malik; ~~Wahab Riaz~~; Mohammad Rizwan; Yasir Shah; Ahmed Shehzad; Sohail Tanvir; Imad Wasim; Zia-ul-Haq

Pakistan bowler Wahab Riaz injured his hand during the first day of the second Test and was ruled out of the rest of the series. Riaz was originally named in the T20I squad, but was replaced by Zia-ul-Haq as his injury did not fully heal. Sri Lankan batsman Upul Tharanga replaced Kumar Sangakkara for the third Test due to Sangakkara's commitments with Surrey. On 2 July Sri Lankan bowler Dushmantha Chameera was ruled out of the third Test due to injury and was replaced by Lahiru Gamage. Lahiru Gamage replaced injured Nuwan Pradeep in the fifth ODI.

== Tour Match ==
=== SLCB President's XI vs Pakistanis ===
11 - 13 June 2015
Scorecard

Pakistanis	v	SLCB President's XI
247 (73.3 overs); Ahmed Shehzad 82 (144); Jeffrey Vandersay 5/73 (19.3 overs)		241 (89.1 overs); Kaushal Silva 101 (222); Zulfiqar Babar 2/45 (23.1 overs)
257/7d (69.4 overs); Shan Masood 69 (122); Jeffrey Vandersay 3/94 (18.4 overs)		129/3 (27 overs); Dimuth Karunaratne 54 (69); Ehsan Adil 1/24 (9 overs)

Match drawn
Colombo Cricket Club Ground, Colombo
Umpires: Ravindra Kottahachchi (SL) and Prageeth Rambukwella (SL)

- Pakistanis won the toss and elected to bat.
- Both teams were able to name up to 14 players (11 batting, 11 fielding).

== Test series ==
=== 1st Test ===
17 - 21 June 2015
Scorecard

Sri Lanka	v	Pakistan
300 (109.3 overs); Kaushal Silva 125 (300); Zulfiqar Babar 3/64 (27 overs)		417 (113.1 overs); Asad Shafiq 131 (256); Dilruwan Perera 4/122 (31.1 overs)
206 (77.1 overs); Dimuth Karunaratne 79 (173); Yasir Shah 7/76 (30.1 overs)		92/0 (11.2 overs); Mohammad Hafeez 46* (33)

Pakistan won by 10 wickets
Galle International Stadium, Galle
Umpires: Richard Illingworth (Eng) and Paul Reiffel (Aus)
Player of the match: Sarfaraz Ahmed (Pak)

- Pakistan won the toss and elected to field.
- No play was possible on day 1 due to rain. The start of day 2 was delayed due to a wet outfield and play finished early at 17:30 due to bad light. Rain ended played early on day 3.
- With their 123rd win, Pakistan became Asia's most successful Test team.

=== 2nd Test ===
25 - 29 June 2015
Scorecard

Pakistan	v	Sri Lanka
138 (42.5 overs); Mohammad Hafeez 42 (75); Tharindu Kaushal 5/42 (10.5 overs)		315 (121.3 overs); Kaushal Silva 80 (218); Yasir Shah 6/96 (41.3 overs)
329 (118.2 overs); Azhar Ali 117 (308); Dhammika Prasad 4/92 (29.3 overs)		153/3 (26.3 overs); Dimuth Karunaratne 50 (57); Yasir Shah 2/55 (10.3 overs)

Sri Lanka won by 7 wickets
P Sara Oval, Colombo
Umpires: Richard Illingworth (Eng) and Sundaram Ravi (Ind)
Player of the match: Dhammika Prasad (SL)

- Pakistan won the toss and elected to bat
- On day 1, rain stopped play at 1:20 for 55 minutes. On day 2, rain stopped play in last 10 minutes of the day's play. On day 3 rain delayed the start of play by 15 minutes. Rain stopped play just before tea on day 4, with no further play possible.
- Dushmantha Chameera (SL) made his Test debut.
- This was Sri Lanka's 50th Test victory on home soil.
- Tharindu Kaushal (SL) took his first 5-wicket haul.
- Younis Khan (Pak) played in his 100th Test.
- After dismissing Sri Lankan captain Angelo Mathews in the first innings, Yasir Shah became the fastest Pakistani bowler to take 50 wickets.

=== 3rd Test ===
3 - 7 July 2015
Scorecard

Sri Lanka	v	Pakistan
278 (89.5 overs); Dimuth Karunaratne 130 (230); Yasir Shah 5/78 (31.5 overs)		215 (66 overs); Sarfaraz Ahmed 78* (104); Nuwan Pradeep 3/29 (15 overs)
313 (95.4 overs); Angelo Mathews 122 (252); Imran Khan 5/58 (20.4 overs)		382/3 (103.1 overs); Younis Khan 171* (271); Suranga Lakmal 1/48 (19 overs)

Pakistan won by 7 wickets
Pallekele International Cricket Stadium, Kandy
Umpires: Ian Gould (Eng) and Paul Reiffel (Aus)
Player of the match: Younis Khan (Pak)

- Pakistan won the toss and elected to field.
- On day 2, rain interrupted two times after lunch and play delayed one and half hours. Rain again delayed played in last 15 minutes of the day's play. Bad light finished play early on day 3.
- This was Pakistan's highest successful chase in Test cricket.
- With this victory Pakistan moved from sixth to third in the Test rankings.

== ODI series ==
=== 1st ODI ===
11 July 2015
10:00
Scorecard

Sri Lanka; 255/8 (50 overs)	v	Pakistan; 259/4 (45.2 overs)
Dinesh Chandimal 65* (68); Mohammad Hafeez 4/41 (10 overs)		Mohammad Hafeez 103 (95); Suranga Lakmal 1/21 (5 overs)

Pakistan won by 6 wickets
Rangiri Dambulla International Stadium, Dambulla
Umpires: Ian Gould (Eng) and Ranmore Martinesz (SL)
Player of the match: Mohammad Hafeez (Pak)

- Pakistan won the toss and elected to field.
- Milinda Siriwardana (SL) made his ODI debut.

=== 2nd ODI ===
15 July 2015
14:30 (D/N)
Scorecard

Pakistan; 287/8 (50 overs)	v	Sri Lanka; 288/8 (48.1 overs)
Azhar Ali 79 (104); Lasith Malinga 2/64 (10 overs)		Kusal Perera 68 (25); Rahat Ali 3/73 (9.1 overs)

Sri Lanka won by 2 wickets
Pallekele International Cricket Stadium, Kandy
Umpires: Ranmore Martinesz (SL) and Rod Tucker (Aus)
Player of the match: Kusal Perera (SL)

- Pakistan won the toss and elected to bat.
- The start was delayed by 10 minutes due to rain and wet outfield.
- Sachith Pathirana (SL) made his ODI debut.
- Kusal Perera (SL) scored the joint second fastest ODI fifty.
- This is the highest ODI run chase at Pallekele.

=== 3rd ODI ===
19 July 2015
14:30 (D/N)
Scorecard

Pakistan; 316/4 (50 overs)	v	Sri Lanka; 181 (41.1 overs)
Sarfaraz Ahmed 77 (74); Sachith Pathirana 1/49 (10 overs)		Lahiru Thirimanne 56 (67); Yasir Shah 4/29 (10 overs)

Pakistan won by 135 runs
R. Premadasa Stadium, Colombo
Umpires: Ian Gould (Eng) and Raveendra Wimalasiri (SL)
Player of the match: Sarfaraz Ahmed (Pak)

- Pakistan won the toss and elected to bat.
- Rain stopped play for 15 minutes during Pakistan's innings.
- Imad Wasim (Pak) made his ODI debut.
- Play was suspended for 30 minutes during Sri Lanka's run-chase due to crowd trouble.

=== 4th ODI ===
22 July 2015
14:30 (D/N)
Scorecard

Sri Lanka; 256/9 (50 overs)	v	Pakistan; 257/3 (40.5 overs)
Lahiru Thirimanne 90 (126); Mohammad Irfan 3/50 (10 overs)		Ahmed Shehzad 95 (90); Milinda Siriwardana 1/28 (5.5 overs)

Pakistan won by 7 wickets
R. Premadasa Stadium, Colombo
Umpires: Rod Tucker (Aus) and Raveendra Wimalasiri (SL)
Player of the match: Ahmed Shehzad (Pak)

- Sri Lanka won the toss and elected to bat.

=== 5th ODI ===
26 July 2015
14:30 (D/N)
Scorecard

Sri Lanka; 368/4 (50 overs)	v	Pakistan; 203 (37.2 overs)
Kusal Perera 116 (109); Rahat Ali 2/74 (10 overs)		Mohammad Hafeez 37 (37); Sachithra Senanayake 3/39 (8 overs)

Sri Lanka won by 165 runs
Mahinda Rajapaksa International Cricket Stadium, Hambantota
Umpires: Ian Gould (Eng) and Ranmore Martinesz (SL)
Player of the match: Kusal Perera (SL)

- Sri Lanka won the toss and elected to bat.
- Dinesh Chandimal (SL) played in his 100th ODI game.
- Tillakaratne Dilshan (SL) passed 10,000 ODI runs, becoming the fourth Sri Lankan and eleventh overall to achieve the mark.

== T20I series ==
=== 1st T20I ===
30 July 2015
19:00 (D/N)
Scorecard

Pakistan; 175/5 (20 overs)	v	Sri Lanka; 146/7 (20 overs)
Umar Akmal 46 (24); Thisara Perera 2/30 (4 overs)		Milinda Siriwardana 35 (18); Sohail Tanvir 3/29 (4 overs)

Pakistan won by 29 runs
R. Premadasa Stadium, Colombo
Umpires: Ranmore Martinesz (SL) and Ruchira Palliyaguruge (SL)
Player of the match: Sohail Tanvir (Pak)

- Pakistan won the toss and elected to bat.
- Dhananjaya de Silva, Milinda Siriwardana, Jeffrey Vandersay and Binura Fernando (all SL) made their T20I debuts.

=== 2nd T20I ===
1 August 2015
19:00 (D/N)
Scorecard

Sri Lanka; 172/7 (20 overs)	v	Pakistan; 174/9 (19.2 overs)
Chamara Kapugedera 48* (25); Shoaib Malik 2/16 (3 overs)		Anwar Ali 46 (17); Binura Fernando 2/33 (3.2 overs)

Pakistan won by 1 wicket
R. Premadasa Stadium, Colombo
Umpires: Ruchira Palliyaguruge (SL) and Raveendra Wimalasiri (SL)
Player of the match: Anwar Ali (Pak)

- Sri Lanka won the toss and elected to bat.
- Shehan Jayasuriya and Dasun Shanaka (both SL) made their T20I debuts.
