= Sri Lankan cricket team in South Africa in 2011–12 =

International cricket tour

Sri Lankan cricket team in South Africa in 2011
	Sri Lanka	South Africa
- Dates: 9 December 2011 – 22 January 2012
Captains	Tillakaratne Dilshan	Graeme Smith (Test); AB De Villiers (ODI)

Test series
- Result: South Africa won the 3-match series 2–1
Most runs	Thilan Samaraweera (339)	AB de Villiers (353)
Most wickets	Rangana Herath (10)	Vernon Philander (16)
- Player of the series: AB de Villiers (SA)

One Day International series
- Results: South Africa won the 5-match series 3–2
Most runs	Dinesh Chandimal (211)	AB de Villiers (329)
Most wickets	Lasith Malinga (11)	Lonwabo Tsotsobe (11)
- Player of the series: AB de Villiers (SA)

The Sri Lankan cricket team toured South Africa from 9 December 2011 to 22 January 2012. The tour included three Tests and five One Day Internationals (ODIs) between Sri Lanka and South Africa.

The Test series was won by South Africa, 2–1. South Africa won the first Test in Centurion and Sri Lanka won the second in Durban, before South Africa won the third and deciding Test at Newlands, Cape Town, played from 3 to 6 January 2012. It was the first time that South Africa had won a Test series played in South Africa since 2008. AB De Villiers was the man of the series, scoring 353 runs at an average of 117.66.In the second test Sri Lanka won its first ever test match on South African soil.

South Africa won the ODI series 3–2. De Villiers, the newly appointed South African ODI captain, was again the man of the series with 329 runs at an average of 109.66.

== Squads ==
Tests		Limited overs	
South Africa	Sri Lanka	South Africa	Sri Lanka
Graeme Smith (c); AB de Villiers; Hashim Amla; Mark Boucher (wk); Dale Steyn; Marchant de Lange; Imran Tahir; Jacques Kallis; Morné Morkel; Alviro Petersen; Vernon Philander; Ashwell Prince; Jacques Rudolph	Tillakaratne Dilshan (c); Angelo Mathews; Dinesh Chandimal (wk); Nuwan Pradeep; Dilhara Fernando; Rangana Herath; Mahela Jayawardene; Dimuth Karunaratne; Ajantha Mendis; Tharanga Paranavitana; Thisara Perera; Thilan Samaraweera; Kumar Sangakkara; Kaushal Silva; Lahiru Thirimanne; Chanaka Welegedara; Suranga Lakmal	AB de Villiers (c, wk); Hashim Amla (vc); Johan Botha; JP Duminy; Faf du Plessis; Jacques Kallis; Rory Kleinveldt; Albie Morkel; Morné Morkel; Wayne Parnell; Robin Peterson; Graeme Smith; Dale Steyn; Lonwabo Tsotsobe	Tillakaratne Dilshan (c); Angelo Mathews (vc); Dinesh Chandimal; Dilhara Fernando; Rangana Herath; Mahela Jayawardene; Kosala Kulasekara; Nuwan Kulasekara; Lasith Malinga; Ajantha Mendis; Thisara Perera; Dhammika Prasad; Kumar Sangakkara (wk); Upul Tharanga; Lahiru Thirimanne

== Tour matches ==
=== First-class: South African Invitation XI vs Sri Lankans ===
9–11 December
Scorecard

South African Invitation XI	v	Sri Lankans
357 (97 overs); Dean Elgar 78 (110); Dilhara Fernando 4/76 (18 overs)		207/3 (52.3 overs); Tharanga Paranavitana 100 (161); David Wiese 1/32 (14 overs)

Match drawn
Willowmoore Park, Benoni
Umpires: Ian Howell (SA) & Brad White

- South African Invitation XI won the toss and elected to bat.

=== List A: Emerging Cape Cobras v Sri Lankans ===
11 January
Scorecard

Sri Lankans; 296/9 (50 overs)	v	Emerging Cape Cobras; 218 (47.4 overs)
Mahela Jayawardene 74 (70); Alistair Gray 3/52 (10 overs)		Alistair Gray 93 (126); Rangana Herath 3/33 (7.4 overs)

Sri Lankans won by 78 runs
Brackenfell Sports Fields, Brackenfell
Umpires: Johan Cloete (SA) & Shaun George (SA)

- Sri Lankans won the toss and elected to bat.

== Test Series ==
=== 1st Test ===
15–19 December
Scorecard

Sri Lanka	v	South Africa
180 (47.4 Overs); Angelo Mathews 38 (52); Vernon Philander 5/53 (13 Overs)		411 (122.0 Overs); AB de Villiers 99 (135); Chanaka Welegedara 3/96 (31 Overs)
150 (39.1 Overs); Thilan Samaraweera 32 (54); Vernon Philander 5/49 (11.1 Overs)

South Africa won by an innings and 81 runs
SuperSport Park, Centurion
Umpires: Steve Davis (Aus) and Rod Tucker (Aus)
Player of the match: Vernon Philander (SA)

- South Africa won the toss and elected to field.

After winning the toss and electing to field, South Africa's opening bowlers struck early, with Dale Steyn and Vernon Philander taking the wickets of Tillakaratne Dilshan and Kumar Sangakkara respectively. Sri Lanka's other batsmen—Tharanga Paranavitana, Mahela Jayawardene, Thilan Samaraweera and Angelo Mathews—each made starts but were dismissed in their thirties. Sri Lanka lost their final six wickets for just 24 runs, being bowled out for 180 just before tea on the first day. Philander took five wickets, becoming only the fifth bowler in history to take five wickets in an innings in each of his first three Tests. Steyn took four wickets for 18 runs.

By the end of the first day, South Africa had reached 90 runs, half of Sri Lanka's first innings total, for the loss of one wicket, and captain Graeme Smith had scored a half-century. They continued to bat for the whole of the second day, sitting at 9/389 at stumps. South Africa's top scorer was AB de Villiers, who was controversially dismissed on 99 runs. Substitute fieldsman Dimuth Karunaratne claimed to have caught him at backward point, although replays showed the ball may have hit the ground before sliding into his fingers. De Villiers elected to accept Karunaratne's word and, one run short of his 13th Test century, decided against referring the dismissal for a video review.

On the third morning of the match, Mark Boucher and Imran Tahir enjoyed a final-wicket partnership that took South Africa to 411 runs, a lead of 231, with Boucher finishing on 65. South Africa's bowlers proceeded where they left off after the first innings, bowling Sri Lanka out within 40 overs, for just 150. Philander took another five wickets, giving him ten for the match, and was named player of the match. South Africa won by an innings and 81 runs.

=== 2nd Test ===
26–30 December
Scorecard

Sri Lanka	v	South Africa
338 (108.2 overs); Thilan Samaraweera 102 (269); Marchant de Lange 7/81 (23.2 Overs)		168 (54.4 overs); Hashim Amla 54 (85); Chanaka Welegedara 5/52 (16.4 overs)
279 (78.2 overs); Kumar Sangakkara 108 (190); Dale Steyn 5/73 (20 overs)		241 (87.3 overs); AB de Villiers 69 (141); Rangana Herath 5/79 (30.3)

Sri Lanka won by 208 runs
Kingsmead, Durban
Umpires: Steve Davis (Aus) and Richard Kettleborough (Eng)
Player of the match: Rangana Herath (SL)

- Sri Lanka won the toss and elected to bat.
- Test debut: Dinesh Chandimal (SL) and Marchant de Lange (SA).

Sri Lanka called up 22-year-old wicketkeeper-batsman Dinesh Chandimal to make his Test debut, replacing Kaushal Silva. In-form bowler Vernon Philander withdrew from South Africa's team due to injury. In his place, 21-year-old fast bowler Marchant de Lange made his debut.

De Lange made an instant impact. After Sri Lanka won the toss and decided to bat, he took seven wickets, including those of Kumar Sangakkara, for a duck, and Thilan Samaraweera, who top-scored for Sri Lanka with 102. De Lange's figures of 7/81 were the best for any bowler in Test cricket in 2011. Chandimal also enjoyed a successful first innings of Test cricket, scoring 58 in Sri Lanka's total of 338.

In response, South Africa were dismissed within the second day for a total of 168, only narrowly avoiding being asked to follow on. Pace bowler Chanaka Welegedara took five wickets and spinner Rangana Herath took four. Hashim Amla was the only South African batsman to score a half-century, with 54. Sri Lanka pressed their advantage batting on the third day of the Test. Sangakkara, at the time the top-ranked Test batsman in the world, scored his 28th Test century, making 108, while Chandimal (54) scored his second half-century of the match. Dale Steyn took five wickets as Sri Lanka were bowled out on the fourth morning of the match for 279.

South Africa needed 450 in the fourth innings to win the match, and fell well short of the target, being bowled out on the fourth day for 241. For the first time in 149 Tests, Jacques Kallis was dismissed for a pair (a duck in each innings). Herath took Kallis' wicket and four others, finishing with five for the innings and nine for the match to claim the "player of the match" award. AB de Villiers was South Africa's top scorer with 69; Amla scored his second half-century of the match, with 51. Sri Lanka's win levelled the series 1–1. It was their first Test win in 18 months, and their first in South Africa.

=== 3rd Test ===
3–7 January
Scorecard

South Africa	v	Sri Lanka
580/4d (139 Overs); Jacques Kallis 224 (325); Dhammika Prasad 2/154 (30 Overs)		239 (73.5 Overs); Tillakaratne Dilshan 78 (79); Vernon Philander 3/45 (19 Overs)
2/0 (0.0 overs); Alviro Petersen 1* (1); Dhammika Prasad 0/2 (0.0 overs)		342 (f/o) (107.5 Overs); Thilan Samaraweera 115* (215); Jacques Kallis 3/35 (14.5 Overs)

South Africa won by 10 wickets
Newlands, Cape Town
Umpires: Richard Kettleborough (Eng) and Rod Tucker (SA)
Player of the match: Jacques Kallis (SA)

- Sri Lanka won the toss and elected to field.

South Africa's underperformance in the second Test caused their team selectors to drop batsman Ashwell Prince. He was replaced by Alviro Petersen, the 31-year-old Highveld Lions captain, recalled to the side to play in his tenth Test. Petersen was selected to open the batting, relegating Jacques Rudolph to occupy Prince's position at number six in South Africa's line-up. Vernon Philander returned to the team after recovering from the injury that kept him out of the second Test, replacing Marchant de Lange despite de Lange's impressive debut. Sri Lanka replaced injured bowler Dilhara Fernando with Dhammika Prasad, and dropped opener Tharanga Paranavitana for Lahiru Thirimanne.

Sri Lanka won the toss and elected to bowl, a decision called into question when South Africa ended the first day at 3/347. Prasad took the early wickets of Graeme Smith and Hashim Amla, but then followed large partnerships between Petersen and Jacques Kallis, and Kallis and AB de Villiers. On the second day of the Test, South Africa reached 4/580, declaring before the tea break. Kallis scored 224, de Villiers was not out on 160, and Petersen had scored a century upon his recall to the team, with 109. Kallis' double century was his second in Test cricket. It was Kallis' 150th Test; he became the sixth player in history and the first South African to reach the milestone.

South Africa then proceeded to bowl Sri Lanka out twice. First, they were bowled out for 239, after which South Africa enforced the follow on. Needing 341 to avoid an innings defeat and force South Africa to bat again, Sri Lanka reached 342 after a century to Thilan Samaraweera (115 not out). Needing just two runs to win, Alviro Petersen hit the winning run off a Prasad no-ball on the Test's fourth day. South Africa thus won the series 2–1, their first series win at home since 2008. It was Sri Lanka's fourth defeat out of the four Test series they had ever played in South Africa. Kallis was named the player of the match; de Villiers was the player of the series, scoring 353 runs at an average of 117.66.

=== Statistics ===
Test Statistics
South Africa	Tests	Runs	Wickets	Sri Lanka	Tests	Runs	Wickets
Graeme Smith (c)	3	118	0	Tillakaratne Dilshan (c)	3	146	2
AB de Villiers	3	353		Angelo Mathews	3	140	1
Hashim Amla	3	139		Dinesh Chandimal	2	148	
Mark Boucher (wk)	3	75		Dilhara Fernando	2	7	3
Dale Steyn	3	72	14	Rangana Herath	3	76	10
Marchant de Lange	1	9	8	Mahela Jayawardene	3	132	
Imran Tahir	3	40	10	Tharanga Paranavitana	2	57	
Jacques Kallis	3	255	3	Thisara Perera	3	81	5
Morné Morkel	3	9	8	Thilan Samaraweera	3	339	0
Alviro Petersen	1	110		Kumar Sangakkara (wk)	3	180	
Vernon Philander	2	4	16	Kaushal Silva	1	17	
Ashwell Prince	2	57		Lahiru Thirimanne	1	53	
Jacques Rudolph	3	124		Chanaka Welegedara	3	50	9
				Dhammika Prasad	1	25	2

== ODI Series ==
=== 1st ODI ===
11 January (D/N)
Scorecard

South Africa; 301/8 (50 overs)	v	Sri Lanka; 43 (20.1 overs)
Hashim Amla 112 (128); Lasith Malinga 5/53 (10 overs)		Kosala Kulasekara 19 (46); Morné Morkel 4/10 (6 overs)

South Africa won by 258 runs
Boland Park, Paarl
Umpires: Billy Doctrove (WI) and Marais Erasmus (SA)
Player of the match: Morné Morkel (SA)

- South Africa won the toss and elected to bat

The first of the five matches in the ODI series, held at Boland Park, Paarl, marked the debut of AB de Villiers as South Africa's captain in the format. De Villiers succeeded Graeme Smith after the 2011 World Cup, although Smith remained in the team as a batsman.

De Villiers won the toss, decided to bat, and his team responded by piling on 301 runs for the loss of eight wickets. His vice-captain Hashim Amla top scored with 112 off 128 balls; it was Amla's ninth ODI century, underlining his position as the International Cricket Council's top-ranked batsman in the format. Jacques Kallis (72) and de Villiers (52) each scored half-centuries before the team's progress was halted by a late run of wickets taken by Lasith Malinga. Malinga finished South Africa's innings with figures of 5/53, his fifth five-wicket haul in ODIs.

In response, Sri Lanka—who just nine months earlier had been World Cup finalists—collapsed to be all out for 43 runs off barely 20 overs. Four players made ducks, including both opening batsman, Tillakaratne Dilshan and Upul Tharanga. Sri Lanka's leading batsman, Kumar Sangakkara and Mahela Jayawardene also failed, out for four and two respectively. Kosala Kulasekara's 19 was the only Sri Lankan innings to reach double figures. Morné Morkel took four wickets and was named man of the match, Lonwabo Tsotsobe took three. South Africa's 258-run winning margin was the third highest in the history of ODI cricket. It was Sri Lanka's largest ever defeat and South Africa's largest ever win, while Sri Lanka's 43 runs was the lowest score in their history. Sri Lanka's captain Dilshan said after the match that it was the "worst game of my career", and defended the exclusion of Thilan Samaraweera, the team's top batsman in the recently concluded Test series, from the ODI squad.

=== 2nd ODI ===
14 January
Scorecard

Sri Lanka; 236/6 (50 overs)	v	South Africa; 237/5 (48.4 overs)
Dinesh Chandimal 92* (115); Morné Morkel 2/39 (9 overs)		JP Duminy 66* (87); Dhammika Prasad 3/46 (10 overs)

South Africa won by 5 wickets (with 8 balls remaining)
Buffalo Park, East London
Umpires: Billy Doctrove (WI) and Shaun George (SA)
Player of the match: JP Duminy (SA)

- South Africa won the toss and elected to field

Following their heavy defeat in the first ODI, Sri Lanka made two changes to their team enforced due to injury. Rangana Herath replaced fellow spinner Ajantha Mendis, while pace bowler Dhammika Prasad was called up to play in the place of Dilhara Fernando. South Africa made no changes to their team.

After being sent into bat, Sri Lanka started slowly, scoring 37 runs off the first 15 overs for the loss of two wickets. Upul Tharanga and Dinesh Chandimal combined for a third wicket partnership of 84, before Tharanga was caught behind off Morné Morkel's bowling for 66. Chandimal went on to make 92 not out, and Sri Lanka completed its 50 overs on the score of 6/236. Morkel and Lonwabo Tsotsobe took two wickets each for South Africa.

South Africa started their innings comparatively quickly, reaching 0/75 after their first 15 overs. From there, starts to all their specialist batsman (none scored less than 17) ensured they reached Sri Lanka's target with eight balls to spare. Hashim Amla followed up his century in the first match of the series with a half-century (55 off 58 balls), while JP Duminy top scored and won the man of the match award, with 66 not out off 87 balls.

=== 3rd ODI ===
17 January (D/N)
Scorecard

Sri Lanka; 266/9 (50 overs)	v	South Africa; 179/5 (34 overs)
Upul Tharanga 58 (65); Morné Morkel 2/65 (9 overs)		Faf du Plessis 72 (74); Lasith Malinga 2/20 (5 overs)

South Africa won by 4 runs (D/L method)
OUTsurance Oval, Bloemfontein
Umpires: Johan Cloete (SA) and Nigel Llong (Eng)
Player of the match: Faf du Plessis (SA)

- Sri Lanka won the toss and elected to bat.

South Africa were without two of their key batsman as they looked to gain a series-winning 3–0 lead in Bloemfontein. Vice-captain Hashim Amla took paternal leave while veteran all-rounder Jacques Kallis was rested. Colin Ingram and Alviro Petersen took their places.

Sri Lanka's vice-captain Angelo Mathews spoke before the match about his team's aim to score 250 runs in the match. They won the toss, elected to bat, and achieved Mathews' target, completing 50 overs at 9/266. Opening batsmen Tillakaratne Dilshan and Upul Tharanga scored Sri Lanka's first 94 runs before Kumar Sangakkara, Dinesh Chandimal and Kosala Kulasekara scored over 30 runs each and Tharanga top-scored with 58. South Africa started their run chase badly, with the early loss of Graeme Smith and Colin Ingram to the bowling of Lasith Malinga. Faf du Plessis recovered South Africa's prospects; promoted to fourth in the batting lineup, he scored 72 off 74 balls before being run out. Quick scoring from JP Duminy and AB de Villiers helped take South Africa to 5/179 when rain struck after 34 overs. The rain was too heavy and persistent to allow the match to restart, and South Africa were deemed to be the winners of the match by four runs according to the Duckworth–Lewis method.

=== 4th ODI ===
20 January (D/N)
Scorecard

South Africa; 299/7 (50 overs)	v	Sri Lanka; 304/5 (48.4 overs)
AB de Villiers 96 (76); Thisara Perera 2/34 (4 overs)		Tillakaratne Dilshan 87 (87); Lonwabo Tsotsobe 3/51 (10 overs)

Sri Lanka won by 5 wickets (with 8 balls remaining)
De Beers Diamond Oval, Kimberley
Umpires: Johan Cloete (SA) and Billy Doctrove (WI)
Player of the match: Thisara Perera (SL)

- South Africa won the toss and elected to bat.
- Sachithra Senanayake (SL) made his ODI debut.

South Africa rested Dale Steyn and Albie Morkel for the dead rubber fourth match of the series, calling up Wayne Parnell and Vernon Philander in their places. For Sri Lanka, Lahiru Thirimanne replaced the injured Mahela Jayawardene and off spinner Sachithra Senanayake made his debut, replacing pace bowler Dhammika Prasad.

South Africa's Test captain Graeme Smith had been under pressure to retain his position in the ODI side after a string of mediocre performances with the bat. Batting first, he enjoyed an 87-run opening partnership with Alviro Petersen and made 68 runs off 69 balls. AB de Villiers made 96, promoting himself to number three in the batting lineup, before being bowled by Thisara Perera. Sitting at 3/242 after 39 overs, South Africa were heading towards a total well in excess of 300; however, a late run of wickets slowed their progress and they finished their 50 overs on 7/299.

In response, Sri Lanka successfully chased a target of 300 or more for the first time against South Africa. Captain Tillakaratne Dilshan scored 87 off 87 balls, Dinesh Chandimal scored 59, and Thisara Perera scored five sixes in his 69 off 44 balls. Perera's fast scoring ensured Sri Lanka reached the target in the 49th over, avoiding a series whitewash.

=== 5th ODI ===
22 January
Scorecard

South Africa; 312/4 (50 overs)	v	Sri Lanka; 314/8 (49.5 overs)
AB de Villiers 125* (98); Lasith Malinga 2/79 (10 overs)		Kumar Sangakkara 102 (97); Robin Peterson 2/38 (6.5 overs)

Sri Lanka won by 2 wickets (with 1 ball remaining)
New Wanderers Stadium, Johannesburg
Umpires: Marais Erasmus (SA) and Nigel Llong (Eng)
Player of the match: Kumar Sangakkara (SL)

- Sri Lanka won the toss and elected to field.

Having been sent into bat by Sri Lanka, South Africa scored 312 off 50 overs, thanks to centuries from Graeme Smith and AB de Villiers (both 125). Sri Lanka chased down the total with one ball to spare, making it the second time in ODIs that a team had successfully reached a target of 300 or more in consecutive matches. Kumar Sangakkara top-scored with 102, while Lahiru Thirimanne scored 69.

The match turned out to be Tillakaratne Dilshan's last as Sri Lanka's captain. After the match he resigned his position and was replaced by Mahela Jayawardene.

=== Statistics ===
ODI statistics
South Africa	Matches	Runs	Wickets	Sri Lanka	Matches	Runs	Wickets
AB de Villiers (c)	5	329	–	Tillakaratne Dilshan (c)	5	161	1
Graeme Smith	5	229	–	Angelo Mathews	5	70	0
Hashim Amla	2	167	–	Dinesh Chandimal	5	211	–
Lonwabo Tsotsobe	5	–	11	Dilhara Fernando	1	1	0
Dale Steyn	3	1	3	Rangana Herath	4	2	2
JP Duminy	5	133	3	Mahela Jayawardene	3	36	–
Faf du Plessis	5	129	0	Upul Tharanga	5	176	–
Jacques Kallis	2	109	–	Thisara Perera	2	71	2
Morné Morkel	5	1	8	Nuwan Kulasekara	5	68	2
Alviro Petersen	3	60	–	Kumar Sangakkara	5	179	–
Vernon Philander	1	2	1	Lasith Malinga	5	3	11
Albie Morkel	4	62	0	Lahiru Thirimanne	2	82	–
Robin Peterson	5	27	6	Kosala Kulasekara	3	38	0
Wayne Parnell	2	21	2	Dhammika Prasad	2	–	3
Colin Ingram	3	14	–	Sachithra Senanayake	2	6	1
				Ajantha Mendis	1	3	1
