= Nuwan Kulasekara =

Sri Lankan cricketer (born 1982)

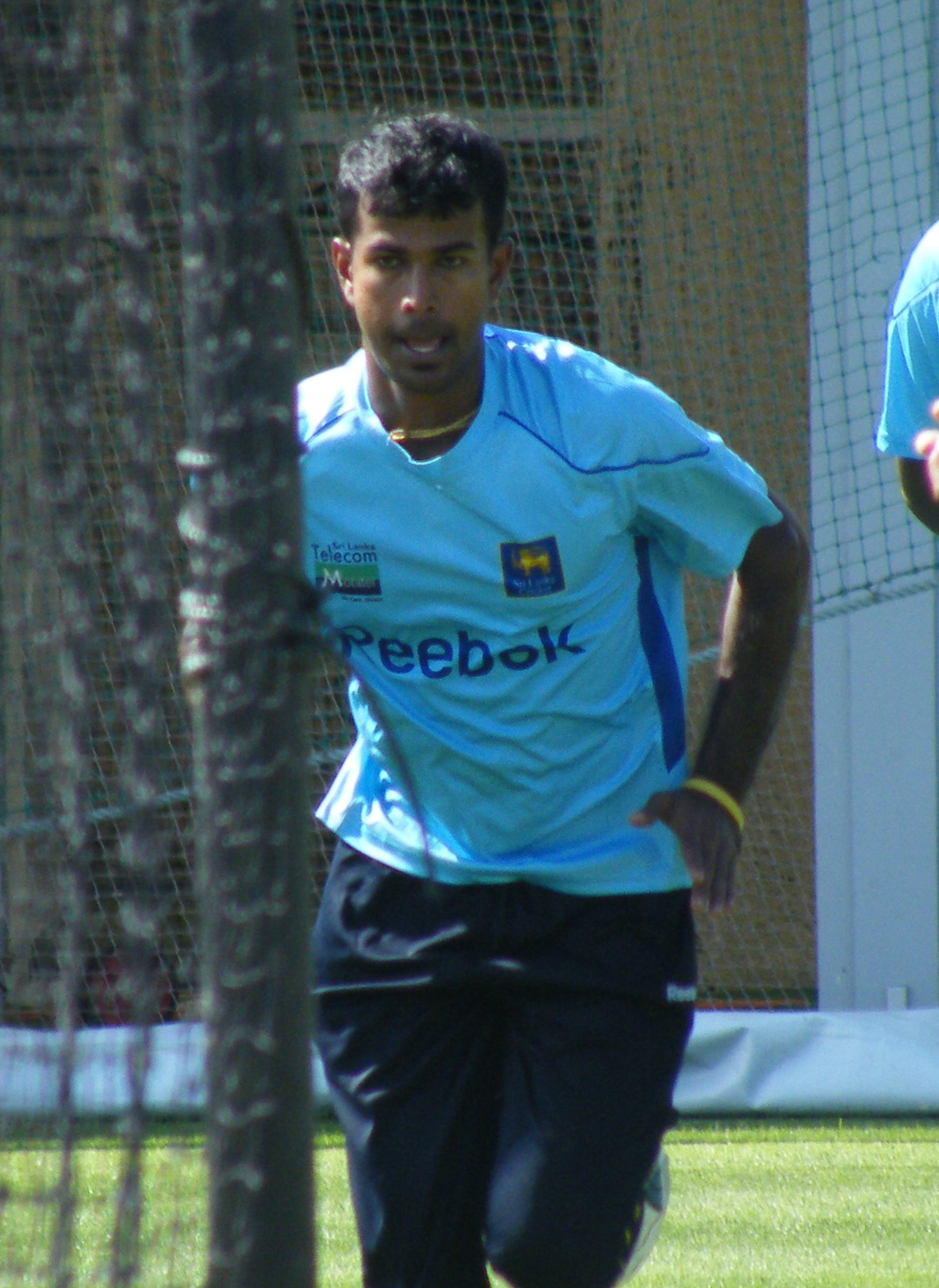

Personal information
- Full name: Kulasekara Mudiyanselage Dinesh Nuwan Kulasekara
- Born: 22 July 1982 (age 44); Kirindiwela, Sri Lanka
- Height: 1.76 m (5 ft 9 in)
- Batting: Right-handed
- Bowling: Right-arm fast-medium
- Role: Bowler

International information
- National side: Sri Lanka (2003–2017)
- Test debut (cap 100): 4 April 2005 v New Zealand
- Last Test: 16 March 2013 v Bangladesh
- ODI debut (cap 118): 18 November 2003 v England
- Last ODI: 10 July 2017 v Zimbabwe
- T20I debut: 11 October 2008 v Pakistan
- Last T20I: 6 April 2017 v Bangladesh

Domestic team information
- Years: Team
- 2002–2004: Galle Cricket Club
- 2004–2011: Colts Cricket Club
- 2011–2012: Chennai Super Kings
- 2015–2016: Comilla Victorians
- 2018: Lahore Qalandars

Career statistics
Competition	Test	ODI	T20I
Matches	21	184	58
Runs scored	391	1,327	215
Batting average	15.54	15.43	10.23
100s/50s	0/2	0/4	0/0
Top score	64	73	31
Balls bowled	3,567	8,263	1,231
Wickets	48	199	66
Bowling average	37.37	33.92	23.18
5 wickets in innings	0	1	0
10 wickets in match	0	0	0
Best bowling	4/21	5/22	4/31
Catches/stumpings	8/–	46/–	17/–
Medal record
Men's Cricket
Representing Sri Lanka
ICC Cricket World Cup
Runner-up	2007 West-Indies
Runner-up	2011 India–Bangladesh–Sri Lanka
ICC T20 World Cup
Winner	2014 Bangladesh
Runner-up	2009 England
Runner-up	2012 Sri Lanka
- Source: ESPNcricinfo, 24 July 2019

Kulasekara Mudiyanselage Dinesh Nuwan Kulasekara (Sinhala: නුවන් කුලසේකර; born 22 July 1982) is a former Sri Lankan cricketer who played all formats of the game. He was educated at He received his school education up to the G.C.E. (Ordinary Level) at Kirindiwela Madhya Maha Vidyalaya, and subsequently attended Bandaranayake Vidyalaya, Gampaha, for the G.C.E. (Advanced Level)..

A right arm bowler who mastered genuine swing in both ways, Kulasekara was a key member of the team that won the 2014 ICC World Twenty20 and was part of the team that made the finals of 2007 Cricket World Cup, 2011 Cricket World Cup, 2009 ICC World Twenty20 and 2012 ICC World Twenty20. In June 2016, Kulasekara retired from test cricket to play limited overs cricket. In July 2019, he announced his retirement from international cricket. The third ODI between Sri Lanka and Bangladesh on 31 July 2019 was dedicated to Kulasekara.

Since retirement, he has moved to Colombo where he now resides.

== International career ==
=== Early years ===
Kulasekara made his One Day International debut against England in Dambulla on 18 November 2003. He took 2–19 as England was bowled out for 88, and Sri Lanka took less than 14 overs to win the match by 10 wickets. Kulasekara made his test-cricket debut against New Zealand in Napier, New Zealand on 4 April 2005 as Sri Lanka's 100th test cap. During the match, he took only one wicket and scored a duck as the match was drawn. Kulasekara made his Twenty20 International debut on 11 October 2008 against Pakistan. He secured 36 runs in 3.5 overs, although Pakistan won the match by three wickets.

=== Breakthrough ===
In 2008, Kulasekara took 4 for 40 against India. During the Bangladesh tri-series, he helped his team defeat Bangladesh and Zimbabwe. On 25 January 2009, Kulasekara was number two in the ICC rankings for ODI bowlers. He took 45 wickets for an average of 20.97, which included five wickets in the last two ODIs of the series against Pakistan.

Kulasekara topped the 2008 ICC ODI rankings for bowlers with 724 points. He took 47 wickets at 20.97 in 29 matches, with a strike rate of 28.00 and an economy rate of 4.45. Kulasekara was ranked number one among ODI bowlers on 11 March 2009, remaining in that position until 26 September of that year. The retirement of Chaminda Vaas and the inconsistency of Lasith Malinga helped him to emerge as the star strike bowler of the Sri Lankan side. His spell of 4 for 41 at Colombo was nominated as one of the best ODI bowling performances of the year by ESPNcricinfo.

During the Pakistan series at home in 2009, Kulasekara was the highest wicket-taker in the three-match test series. He received the man-of-the-match award for his bowling performance in the second test. Sri Lanka won the series 2–0, and Kulasekara received the player-of-the-series award. He took 17 wickets, for an average of 15.05 and an economy of 2.67. His 4 for 37 is his third four-wicket haul in his last two tests.

Kulasekara was on the 2009 World ODI team (captained by MS Dhoni), which was announced during the ICC Awards. On 23 May 2010 against New Zealand, he ripped through New Zealand's batting with three wickets in his first over and ended with three for four runs. Sri Lanka won the match by seven wickets, and Kulasekara was man of the match. He was named to the test squad for the West Indies series in 2010.

=== Ups and downs ===
Kulasekara and Malinga spearheaded the Sri Lankan team since their debut in 2003 and 2004, where they combined to win matches. During a Twenty20 international against England in Bristol, they produced match-winning combined figures of three wickets for 30 runs in seven overs. Sri Lanka won the match by nine wickets.

Injured in October 2012, Kulasekara played in the semi-final of the fifty-over domestic tournament. He made a comeback with two for 37 in seven overs for Colts Cricket Club against Nondescripts, and was recalled for the test and ODI series against South Africa. Kulasekara did not play in the test series, but played all five ODIs without distinction; he took two wickets in the series, at an average of 107.00.

After a CB series in Australia, he was recalled to the test squad for the Pakistan series in 2012. Kulasekara was the highest wicket-taker in the two-match T20I series against Pakistan, taking four wickets at an average of 6.50; the series was drawn, 1-1. Kulasekara and Malinga took seven wickets apiece during the ODI series in Pakistan, which Sri Lanka won 3–0.

In July 2012, Kulasekara was ruled out of the five-ODI series against India after a first-match injury while attempting a catch to dismiss Virender Sehwag in the eleventh over. On 25 October of that year, he was named as vice-captain of Sri Lanka's T20I squad for its tour against New Zealand.

On 18 January 2013, Kulasekara had his first (and only) five-wicket match with inswing bowling in the third ODI against Australia at Brisbane. His 5/22 bowling figures were the best of his ODI career. Australia crumbled to 74 all out, and Sri Lanka won by four wickets. Kulasekara's performance was nominated as one of the best ODI bowling performances of 2013 by ESPNcricinfo.

=== Injuries ===
On 4 March 2012, he scored 74 against Australia for a close defeat in the first final of the CB Series. Kulasekara was the second-highest wicket-taker for Sri Lanka with 12 wickets, behind Malinga's 18.

On 13 June 2013, against England in 2013 ICC Champions Trophy, Kulasekara helped skipper Kumar Sangakkara score a century and guided Sri Lanka to victory. Sangakkara and Kulasekara added an unbeaten 110 runs for the fourth wicket. In the powerplay, Kulasekara launched Graeme Swann's off-spin for two successive leg-side sixes and continued to an unbeaten 58 from 38 balls. Soon after Sangakkara scored his hundred, he fell in mid-pitch while running. Recognizing the danger of being run out at the wicket-keeper's end, Kulasekara ran alongside him to ensure that he (not Sangakkara) would be run out. After the Champions Trophy, Sri Lanka went to the West Indies for a triangular series with India. During the match against the West Indies, Kulasekara dislocated the ring finger of his left hand.

After three weeks of resting, Kulasekara was called up for the T20I series against South Africa in 2013; Sri Lanka lost the series, 2–1. At the end of an ODI series against Pakistan in the UAE, he tore a hamstring and missed the test series. After he recovered, Kulasekara was included in the Bangladesh series in Bangladesh. His form was off, however, and he missed part of the Bangladesh tour and the 2014 Asia Cup with a groin injury. During the first ODI against Bangladesh, Kulasekara bowled six overs for 38 runs before he was injured.

=== 2014 ===
Kulasekara played in the ODI series against England in 2014, and Sri Lanka won the series 3–2. In the second ODI, he and Sachithra Senanayake bowled-out England for 99 runs for their worst ODI showing at home. Kulasekara took 3 for 15 runs, and Sri Lanka finally won the match by 157 runs.

During a 2014 ICC World Twenty20 match against the Netherlands, Kulasekara set a record for the most economical bowling spell in a T20I or T20 world-cup match (0.00). He bowled two overs without conceding a run; the Netherlands were bowled out for 43, the lowest T20I total.

Kulasekara holds the world record for most T20I maiden overs bowled (six). He was named to CricBuzz's 2014 T20I XI of the year for his limited-overs performance. Kulasekara forged a bowling partnership with Malinga, helping Sri Lanka to win 2014 ICC World Twenty20 by bowling four overs against strong Indian batters. Sri Lanka won 20 ODIs out of 32, a 62.5 winning percentage, that year.

=== Late career ===
Also in 2014, Sri Lanka went to India for an ODI series. They were whitewashed 5–0 in the series, the first such result in Sri Lanka cricket history. Rohit Sharma scored the highest individual ODI total (264); Kulasekara took 1 for 89 in nine overs, and missed the England series. On 30 December 2014, however, he was recalled to the ODI squad for the series against New Zealand at home. Kulasekara was the T20 Bowler of the Year at the 2015 Sri Lanka Cricket Awards. He was overlooked for the July series against Pakistan that year (after his World Cup campaign), but was recalled to the ODI squad for the series against the West Indies.

On 18 December 2015, Kulasekara replaced the injured Dhammika Prasad on Sri Lanka's ODI squad against New Zealand. Sri Lanka won only one match in the series, losing in all three formats. In the first ODI, Kulasekara scored his fourth ODI fifty; he and Milinda Siriwardana formed a partnership with 98 runs. He was dismissed for 58 runs, and Sri Lanka scored a total of 188; New Zealand won the match by seven wickets. He played in 2016 Asia Cup and then 2016 ICC World Twenty20 in India,

On 5 November 2016, Kulasekara was recalled for the tri-series with Zimbabwe and the West Indies; he picked up two wickets against West Indies to go with his two in the first match against Zimbabwe. Sri Lanka won the series by defeating Zimbabwe in the final, and Kulasekara took one wicket in that final. He was the third-highest wicket-taker in the series, with eight wickets and an average of 22.50. During the Bangladesh tour of Sri Lanka in 2017, Kulasekara helped Sri Lanka end their ODI drought by taking four wickets for 37 runs; Sri Lanka won the third ODI match by 70 runs.

I was going to announce my retirement straight after the World Cup but Lasith Malinga made a special request during the world cup to play alongside me in his final game. As such, I wanted to see if there was any way to make that happen. That's why my retirement announcement was delayed. It was because of Lasith's request that I also made a request to SLC, to see if there was a possibility of being selected in a farewell match. But I don't think it fit in with SLC's plans as I haven't heard back from them.

— Nuwan Kulasekara

I had the privilege of representing Sri Lanka in every major ICC event between 2007-2014, where the team played in two 50-over World Cup finals, three T20 World Cup finals, including our victorious one in 2014 against India. I was honoured to be the vice-captain of this World Cup-winning team. I represented my team and nation with the highest amount of pride and admiration; nothing was more important to me than seeing Sri Lanka at the top of world cricket. I have no regrets, every day that I played cricket I was happy, and I leave the sport happily.

— Nuwan Kulasekara

=== Retirement ===
On 1 June 2016, Kulasekara announced his retirement from test cricket to focus on limited-over internationals. He played 21 tests, picked up 48 wickets, and played his last test in June 2014 at Lord's (a draw).

During the 2019 Cricket World Cup, fellow Sri Lankan pacer Lasith Malinga had hinted that he would like to retire from ODI cricket with Kulasekara. However, Sri Lanka Cricket and the selection committee and omitted only Kulasekara from the ODI squad for the Bangladesh tour. Kulasekara sent a letter to Sri Lanka Cricket asking them to consider Malinga's request to play a farewell match together; after receiving no reply, he announced his retirement from international cricket on 24 July 2019.

Malinga also announced his retirement from ODI cricket after the first ODI series in Bangladesh. Sri Lanka Cricket announced that the third ODI of the series would be dedicated to Kulasekara. Sri Lanka won the match, shutting out Bangladesh in the series 3–0.

== Records ==
- Highest ODI score for Sri Lanka when batting at the number-eight position - 73
- Most economical spell in a T20I by any bowler - 0.00 against the Netherlands
- Only bowler to record an economy of 0.00 in a T20I
- Most maidens in a T20I - five

== Bowling style ==
Kulasekara used a long run–up and the seam to move both ways to trouble the batsman. Primarily an inswing bowler, he was seldom overly aggressive to batsmen. Kulasekara also developed an outswinger delivery.

== Professional cricket ==
On 29 April 2009, Kulasekara was called to the Kings XI Punjab squad as an emergency replacement for injured Australian batsman Shaun Marsh. He joined the Chennai Super Kings for the 2011 Indian Premier League season.

Kulasekara played in the domestic T20I series for Kandurata Maroons. In the final, against Basnahira Greens, he took a match-winning three wickets. Kandurata won the match by seven wickets, and was selected for the 2013 Champions League Twenty20. Kulasekara played for Comilla Victorians in the Bangladesh Premier League in 2015. During the match against Rangpur Riders on 27 November 2015, he took four wickets for 12 runs. In 2016, Kulasekara signed a short-term NatWest T20 Blast contract with the Sussex Sharks.

== Coaching career ==
He was appointed as the bowling coach of the Kandy Tuskers franchise for the 2020 Lanka Premier League which also marks his maiden coaching stint in his career.

== Arrest ==
Kulasekara was detained by Kadawatha police on 19 September 2016 after he was involved in a road accident which killed a 28-year-old motorcyclist. He appeared before the Mahara magistrate, and was released on LKR 500,000 bail. The accident occurred near the Kirillawala junction in Kadawatha during the afternoon; the rider was approaching Kulasekara's vehicle, passed a bus, struck an embankment in the centre of the road, and was thrown into the path of Kulasekara's vehicle.
