= Lahiru Gamage =

Sri Lankan cricketer (born 1988)

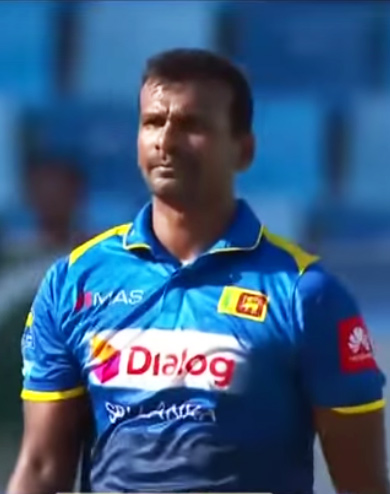
- Lahiru Gamage, October 2017

Personal information
- Full name: Panagamuwa Lahiru Sampath Gamage
- Born: 5 April 1988 (age 38); Maradana, Sri Lanka
- Nickname: Nayaa
- Batting: Right-handed
- Bowling: Right-arm medium-fast
- Role: Bowler

International information
- National side: Sri Lanka (2014–2018)
- Test debut (cap 142): 6 October 2017 v Pakistan
- Last Test: 6 June 2018 v West Indies
- ODI debut (cap 160): 2 November 2014 v India
- Last ODI: 20 October 2017 v Pakistan

Career statistics
Competition	Test	ODI	FC	LA
Matches	5	9	111	97
Runs scored	6	4	977	194
Batting average	1.50	2.00	10.17	5.10
100s/50s	0/0	0/0	0/0	0/0
Top score	3	3	49	18
Balls bowled	1,112	402	14,803	3,620
Wickets	10	9	288	103
Bowling average	57.30	43.55	30.37	30.82
5 wickets in innings	0	0	14	2
10 wickets in match	0	0	2	0
Best bowling	2/38	4/57	7/47	5/13
Catches/stumpings	0/0	2/0	30/–	16/–
- Source: ESPNcricinfo, 17 August 2022

Panagamuwa Lahiru Sampath Gamage (born 5 April 1988), or commonly Lahiru Gamage, is a professional Sri Lankan cricketer, who played for the national team in Tests and One Day Internationals (ODIs). He is right-handed batsman and bowls right-arm fast-medium pace.

== Domestic career ==
In March 2018, he was named in Dambulla's squad for the 2017–18 Super Four Provincial Tournament. He was the leading wicket-taker for Dambulla during the tournament, with ten dismissals in two matches. The following month, he was also named in Dambulla's squad for the 2018 Super Provincial One Day Tournament.

In August 2018, he was named in Kandy's squad the 2018 SLC T20 League. In August 2021, he was named in the SLC Greens team for the 2021 SLC Invitational T20 League tournament. However, prior to the first match, he failed a fitness test. In November 2021, he was selected to play for the Colombo Stars following the players' draft for the 2021 Lanka Premier League.

== International career ==
He made his ODI debut for Sri Lanka against India on 2 November 2014. After a poor performance by Lasith Malinga during the Pakistan ODI series in 2015, Gamage was brought to the squad for last ODI, following an injury to Nuwan Pradeep.

In August 2017, he was added to Sri Lanka's Test squad, ahead of the third match against India, but did not play. He made his Test debut for Sri Lanka against Pakistan on 6 October 2017 in Sri Lanka's first day-night Test match. He took his first Test wicket in the first innings by dismissing Pakistan's opener Shan Masood.

In October 2017, he was named in Sri Lanka's Twenty20 International (T20I) squad for their series against Pakistan, but he did not play.

In May 2018, he was one of 33 cricketers to be awarded a national contract by Sri Lanka Cricket ahead of the 2018–19 season.
