= Sri Lankan cricket team in Scotland in 2019 =

	Scotland	Sri Lanka
- Dates: 18 – 21 May 2019
Captains	Kyle Coetzer	Dimuth Karunaratne

One Day International series
- Results: Sri Lanka won the 2-match series 1–0
Most runs	George Munsey (61)	Dimuth Karunaratne (77)
Most wickets	Brad Wheal (3)	Nuwan Pradeep (4)

The Sri Lanka cricket team toured Scotland in May 2019 to play two One Day International (ODI) matches. The teams have played ODIs against each other twice before, with Sri Lanka winning both matches. The matches took place ahead of the 2019 Cricket World Cup, and were part of Sri Lanka's preparation for the tournament. Ahead of the World Cup, Dimuth Karunaratne was named as Sri Lanka's ODI captain, replacing Lasith Malinga. Sri Lanka won the series 1–0, after the first match was washed out.

== Squads ==
ODIs
Scotland	Sri Lanka
Kyle Coetzer (c); Dylan Budge; Scott Cameron; Matthew Cross (wk); Alasdair Evans; Michael Jones; Michael Leask; Calum MacLeod; Gavin Main; George Munsey; Safyaan Sharif; Tom Sole; Craig Wallace (wk); Mark Watt; Brad Wheal	Dimuth Karunaratne (c); Avishka Fernando; Suranga Lakmal; Lasith Malinga; Angelo Mathews; Jeevan Mendis; Kusal Mendis (wk); Kusal Perera (wk); Thisara Perera; Nuwan Pradeep; Dhananjaya de Silva; Milinda Siriwardana; Lahiru Thirimanne; Isuru Udana; Jeffrey Vandersay

== ODI series ==
=== 1st ODI ===
18 May 2019
11:00
Scorecard

Scotland	v	Sri Lanka

Match abandoned
The Grange Club, Edinburgh
Umpires: Gregory Brathwaite (WI) and Allan Haggo (Sco)

- No toss.
- No play was possible due to rain.

=== 2nd ODI ===
21 May 2019
11:00
Scorecard

Sri Lanka; 322/8 (50 overs)	v	Scotland; 199 (33.2 overs)
Dimuth Karunaratne 77 (88); Brad Wheal 3/49 (10 overs)		George Munsey 61 (42); Nuwan Pradeep 4/34 (7 overs)

Sri Lanka won by 35 runs (DLS method)
The Grange Club, Edinburgh
Umpires: Gregory Brathwaite (WI) and David McLean (Sco)
Player of the match: Nuwan Pradeep (SL)

- Scotland won the toss and elected to field.
- Scotland were set a revised target of 235 runs from 34 overs due to rain.
- Dimuth Karunaratne captained Sri Lanka for the first time in ODIs.
