= Rahat Ali (cricketer) =

Pakistani cricketer

Rahat Ali راحت على
Personal information
- Born: 12 September 1988 (age 38); Multan, Punjab, Pakistan
- Height: 1.91 m (6 ft 3 in)
- Batting: Right-handed
- Bowling: Left-arm fast-medium
- Role: Bowler

International information
- National side: Pakistan (2013–2018)
- Test debut (cap 211): 1 February 2013 v South Africa
- Last Test: 12 May 2018 v Ireland
- ODI debut (cap 189): 9 June 2012 v Sri Lanka
- Last ODI: 26 July 2015 v Sri Lanka
- ODI shirt no.: 90

Domestic team information
- Years: Team
- 2001/02: Punjab cricket team
- Khan Research Laboratories
- 2007–2015: Multan Tigers
- 2017: Karachi Kings (squad no. 90)
- 2018: Quetta Gladiators (squad no. 90)
- 2019: Lahore Qalanders (squad no. 90)
- 2019/20–present: Southern Punjab
- 2020: Peshawar Zalmi (squad no. 90)

Career statistics
Competition	Test	ODI	FC	LA
Matches	21	14	83	63
Runs scored	94	8	364	59
Batting average	9.50	2.66	6.61	5.90
100s/50s	0/0	0/0	0/0	0/0
Top score	35*	6*	35*	12*
Balls bowled	4,227	679	14,172	1,466
Wickets	58	18	279	79
Bowling average	39.03	36.55	25.75	32.73
5 wickets in innings	2	0	12	0
10 wickets in match	0	0	0	0
Best bowling	6/127	3/40	6/40	4/30
Catches/stumpings	9/–	1/–	25/–	13/–
- Source: ESPNCricinfo, 1 January 2020

Rahat Ali (Punjabi: راحت على; born 12 September 1988) is a Pakistani former cricketer who has represented the Pakistan cricket team. He is a left-arm fast-medium bowler and bats right handed. Rahat belongs to a PCB registered club of Multan, PCC (Pioneers Cricket Club). He has represented Multan Tigers, Khan Research Laboratories; and Sui Northern Gas Pipelines Limited. He was selected for the One Day International (ODI) series against Sri Lanka in 2012, making his ODI debut on 9 June 2012.

He made his Test debut against South Africa on 1 February 2013. Rahat Ali bowls with a side-on action and is capable of maintaining speeds around 140 km/h, but he insists his focus is more on swing. A left-arm fast bowler, he took to serious cricket during his first year of college, playing for Multan Cricket Club. Rahat Ali has often been a consistent member of the Pakistan Test squad.

In August 2018, he was one of thirty-three players to be awarded a central contract for the 2018–19 season by the Pakistan Cricket Board (PCB). In March 2019, he was named in Sindh's squad for the 2019 Pakistan Cup. In September 2019, he was named in Southern Punjab's squad for the 2019–20 Quaid-e-Azam Trophy tournament. Ahead of the 2020 PSL Draft, he was released by Lahore Qalandars. In December 2019, he was drafted by Peshawar Zalmi as their Silver Category pick at the 2020 PSL draft.
