= Sudeep Tyagi =

Indian cricketer

Personal information
- Born: 17 September 1987 (age 39); Meerut, Uttar Pradesh, India
- Height: 6 ft 4 in (193 cm)
- Batting: Right-handed
- Bowling: Right arm fast-medium
- Role: Bowler

International information
- National side: India (2009–2010)
- ODI debut (cap 179): 27 December 2009 v Sri Lanka
- Last ODI: 27 February 2010 v South Africa
- Only T20I (cap 26): 12 December 2009 v Sri Lanka

Domestic team information
- Years: Team
- 2007/08–2012/13: Uttar Pradesh
- 2009–2010: Chennai Super Kings
- 2014/15: Saurashtra
- 2015/16–2017/18: Hyderabad
- 2020: Dambulla Viiking

Career statistics
Competition	ODI	T20I	FC	LA
Matches	4	1	41	23
Runs scored	1	0	105	3
Batting average	–	–	3.28	1.50
100s/50s	0/0	0/0	0/0	0/0
Top score	1*	–	14	2*
Balls bowled	165	12	6,105	1,069
Wickets	3	0	109	31
Bowling average	48.00	–	31.99	31.74
5 wickets in innings	0	0	5	1
10 wickets in match	0	0	1	0
Best bowling	1/15	–	6/42	5/44
Catches/stumpings	1/–	1/–	4/–	5/–
- Source: ESPNcricinfo, 17 November 2020

Sudeep Tyagi (born 17 September 1987) is an Indian former international cricketer. He was a right arm fast-medium bowler and a right-handed lower order batsman. In first class cricket, he played for Uttar Pradesh, Saurashtra and Hyderabad. In the Indian Premier League, he represented Chennai Super Kings. In November 2020, Tyagi announced his retirement from all forms of cricket.

== Career ==
Tyagi first represented the senior Uttar Pradesh team at the 2007-08 Ranji Trophy competition, making his debut against Orissa in a game which was highlighted by a double-century from Suresh Raina. It was in this debut match that he took a six-wicket haul, helping his team to an innings victory - a bowling analysis which remains his first-class best. It took until the third match of the competition until he scored his first two first-class runs with the bat. Tyagi finished his stellar debut Ranji season with 41 wickets, the highest in the country. Later in the same month, he played one match in the Duleep Trophy competition, and in February he played in two games in the Vijay Hazare Trophy. While Tyagi missed most of the 2008-09 domestic season due to stress fracture, he re-emerged in 2009 IPL with some great spells. In July 2009, Tyagi travelled with the Indian Emerging Players squad to tour Australia, where the team played against their peers from Australia, South Africa and New Zealand. Tyagi emerged by far the best bowler on show during the tournament, grabbing 14 wickets in 6 games at 18.21 a piece. Tyagi's strong upper body is built along the lines of his UP colleague Praveen Kumar but he is a few yards quicker than Kumar is. Tyagi and Bhuvneshwar Kumar, who was equally impressive in his debut domestic season in 2008-2009 and has attracted quite a bit of attention, along with R.P. Singh and Praveen Kumar, form a very impressive pace bowling quartet for Uttar Pradesh.

He made his ODI debut in the fifth and final match of India's home series against Sri Lanka in December 2009 at the Feroz Shah Kotla. He took one wicket as India bowled first, but his debut was cut short when the umpires ended the match midway through the Sri Lankan innings after deeming the pitch to be unsafe.

He retired from all forms of cricket in November 2020.
