= Milinda Siriwardana =

Sri Lankan cricketer

Personal information
- Full name: Tisse Appuhamilage Milinda Siriwardana
- Born: 4 December 1985 (age 40); Nagoda, Sri Lanka
- Batting: Left-handed
- Bowling: Slow left-arm orthodox
- Role: Batting all rounder

International information
- National side: Sri Lanka (2015–2019)
- Test debut (cap 131): 14 October 2015 v West Indies
- Last Test: 27 May 2016 v England
- ODI debut (cap 164): 11 July 2015 v Pakistan
- Last ODI: 15 June 2019 v Australia
- ODI shirt no.: 57
- T20I debut (cap 55): 1 August 2015 v Pakistan
- Last T20I: 6 April 2017 v Bangladesh

Domestic team information
- Years: Team
- Basnahira South
- Chilaw Marians CC
- Sebastianites C&AC
- 2014: Kandurata Maroons
- Dhaka Division
- Sri Lanka A
- Victoria SC
- 2012: Ruhuna Royals
- 2020: Bhairahawa Gladiators
- 2020: Galle Gladiators

Career statistics
| Competition | Test | ODI | FC | LA |
|---|---|---|---|---|
| Matches | 5 | 27 | 131 | 186 |
| Runs scored | 298 | 516 | 7,715 | 3,768 |
| Batting average | 33.11 | 22.43 | 39.16 | 27.70 |
| 100s/50s | 0/2 | 0/3 | 14/51 | 2/20 |
| Top score | 68 | 66 | 185* | 112 |
| Balls bowled | 413 | 601 | 8,153 | 3,891 |
| Wickets | 11 | 9 | 156 | 107 |
| Bowling average | 23.36 | 60.77 | 33.14 | 28.50 |
| 5 wickets in innings | 0 | 0 | 6 | 1 |
| 10 wickets in match | 0 | 0 | 0 | 0 |
| Best bowling | 3/25 | 2/27 | 5/26 | 6/40 |
| Catches/stumpings | 3/– | 6/– | 106/– | 86/– |
- Source: ESPNricinfo, 28 July 2021

Tisse Appuhamilage Milinda Siriwardana, commonly as Milinda Siriwardana (born 4 December 1985) is a professional Sri Lankan cricketer, who plays for limited over formats. He is a left-hand batsman and a left-arm spinner. He started his cricket career at Kalutara Vidyalaya. He is playing Test, ODI, T20I for Sri Lanka and First class and List A in domestic arena. He usually fields at short cover.

During the West Indies tour in 2015, international commentators Russell Arnold and Ian Bishop praised Siriwardena as the Man with a golden arm due to his wicket-taking ability in each time he started to ball in crucial times.

== Domestic career ==
He made his first-class debut for Sebastianites Cricket and Athletic Club in 2005. He has also represented the Sri Lankan A squad. The closest he came to national recognition was when he was included in the 30-member provisional squad for the 2009 ICC World Twenty20 in England, but he was left out of the final 15 squad. That call-up came close on the heels of his maiden first-class ton, 135 for Basnahira South against Ruhuna Royals in the SLC Inter-Provincial Tournament, a match in which he also claimed five wickets. In 2012, Milinda went over to England to become Bury CC's professional for the 2012 season but his stay was cut short as he was selected to play in the Sri Lanka Premier League.

In March 2018, he was named in Dambulla's squad for the 2017–18 Super Four Provincial Tournament. The following month, he was named as the vice-captain of Dambulla's squad for the 2018 Super Provincial One Day Tournament. In March 2019, he was named in Galle's squad for the 2019 Super Provincial One Day Tournament. In October 2020, he was drafted by the Galle Gladiators for the inaugural edition of the Lanka Premier League. In August 2021, he was named in the SLC Greys team for the 2021 SLC Invitational T20 League tournament. In November 2021, he was selected to play for the Kandy Warriors following the players' draft for the 2021 Lanka Premier League.

== International career ==
On 11 July 2015, Milinda made his One Day International (ODI) debut at the Rangiri Dambulla International Stadium in the ODI series against Pakistan.

He scored his first ODI fifty in the fifth ODI in Pakistan series, where he with skipper Angelo Mathews had an unbeaten partnership of 114 runs. Sri Lanka posted their highest ever ODI total against Pakistan by scoring 368/4 in 50 overs.

He made his Twenty20 International debut for Sri Lanka against Pakistan on 30 July 2015. He was the highest run scorer for Sri Lanka in that match, where he had quick 35 runs, until he gets caught. Sri Lanka eventually lost the match at the end. His first T20 international wicket came on second match of the series, where he took the wicket of Shoaib Malik.

Milinda made his Test debut on 14 October 2015, against the West Indies. Before gaining the Test cap, he scored an unbeaten century in the three-day practice match against the same team.

In the second match of the series, Milinda top scored valuable 68 runs where Sri Lanka were all out for 200 runs in first innings. He showed a good talent with the ball, where he took 2 wickets for 25 runs and with the help of pacer Dhammika Prasad, who got 4 wickets, Windies were all out for 163. In the second innings, Milinda again scored quick 42 runs, just lost his maiden Test fifty. As Sri Lanka only scored 206 runs, Windies only required 244 runs to win the match and level the series. They were at good position to win the game with 1 for 81 runs, Milinda strikes and broke the partnership. West Indies could not come back and Sri Lanka finally won the match by 72 runs and won the series as well. Milinda took his best bowling figures by getting 3 for 25 runs and due to his allround performance, he adjudged man of the match as well.

After average performance in the Test series against England, Siriwardana was dropped from being named to 5-match ODI series. He was named back to the squad for the 3-T20I series against Australia in 2017.

In April 2019, he was named in Sri Lanka's squad for the 2019 Cricket World Cup. The International Cricket Council (ICC) named him as one of the five surprise picks for the tournament.
