= Nuwan Pradeep =

Sri Lankan cricketer (born 1986)

Personal information
- Full name: Aththachchi Nuwan Pradeep Roshan Fernando
- Born: 19 October 1986 (age 40); Negombo, Sri Lanka
- Nickname: Sirasa
- Height: 1.89 m (6 ft 2 in)
- Batting: Right-handed
- Bowling: Right-arm fast
- Role: Bowler

International information
- National side: Sri Lanka (2011–2022)
- Test debut (cap 119): 18 October 2011 v Pakistan
- Last Test: 6 October 2017 v Pakistan
- ODI debut (cap 153): 31 July 2012 v India
- Last ODI: 18 January 2022 v Zimbabwe
- ODI shirt no.: 63
- T20I debut (cap 65): 5 July 2016 v England
- Last T20I: 23 June 2021 v England

Domestic team information
- Years: Team
- 2007–2008: Burgher Recreation Club
- 2008–2011: Bloomfield Cricket and Athletic Club
- 2009–2010: Basnahira North
- 2011: Ruhuna
- 2020: Kandy Tuskers
- 2021-present: Dambulla Giants

Career statistics
Competition	Test	ODI	T20I	FC
Matches	28	49	16	103
Runs scored	132	35	10	408
Batting average	4.00	4.37	10.00	5.36
100s/50s	0/0	0/0	0/0	0/0
Top score	17*	7	8*	37*
Balls bowled	5,077	2,345	278	13,260
Wickets	70	63	15	242
Bowling average	42.90	37.12	29.06	33.17
5 wickets in innings	1	0	0	6
10 wickets in match	0	0	0	0
Best bowling	6/132	4/31	4/25	7/52
Catches/stumpings	5/0	7/0	2/0	36/–
- Source: ESPNcricinfo, 4 April 2025

Aththachchi Nuwan Pradeep Roshan Fernando (Sinhala: නුවන් ප්‍රදීප්; born 19 October 1986), commonly known as Nuwan Pradeep, is a Sri Lankan former international cricketer, currently playing in Lanka Premier League from Dambulla Sixers Franchise. Despite being a national cricketer, he had never actually played the game until he was 20 and most importantly never played with leather ball until his 20s. He shot into prominence after winning a bowling speed contest in 2007 and he was sent to Sri Lanka's Cricket Academy and also went onto earn a national test call up less than 3 years later. He is regarded as the most unconventional find of Sri Lanka cricket.

== Early life ==
Pradeep was born in Negombo, Western Province and grew up in the multilingual fishing neighbourhood in Negombo. He was a product of soft ball cricket when he grew up in his young days.

== Domestic career ==
In 2011, he was surprisingly picked by Royal Challengers Bangalore for the 2011 Indian Premier League even before his international debut. However, he did not play in any matches.

In March 2019, he was named in Kandy's squad for the 2019 Super Provincial One Day Tournament. In October 2020, he was drafted by the Kandy Tuskers for the inaugural edition of the Lanka Premier League. In August 2021, he was named in the SLC Greys team for the 2021 SLC Invitational T20 League tournament. In November 2021, he was selected to play for the Dambulla Giants following the players' draft for the 2021 Lanka Premier League. In July 2022, he was signed by the Dambulla Giants for the third edition of the Lanka Premier League.

Having represented the Sri Lanka Police cricket team that won joint champion status in the 2023 Sri Lanka Cricket first-class competition, Pradeep was appointed to the police service in the rank of inspector of police (IP).

== International career ==
In 2010, Pradeep was called up to the Sri Lankan squad for the second Test against India. He was selected to Sri Lankan provisional squad for the test tour to England in 2011 and he took 4/29 in the warmup match against England Lions as Sri Lanka won it by 38 runs. However, he was ruled out prior to the test series after suffering injury. He was also initially selected in Sri Lankan squad for the test tour of South Africa in 2011 but was ruled out due to hamstring tear.

In 2011 he was again selected to the national Test squad, in the tournament against Pakistan in the UAE. He made his Test debut against Pakistan in October 2011, at the age of 24 but did not take a wicket on debut.

He became an in and out pace bowler for Sri Lanka due to most of the injuries. Despite the fact, he is one of the fastest bowlers ever found on current Sri Lanka squad. He took his first international wicket by dismissing Mohammad Ayub of Pakistan on 25 June 2012 at Galle International Stadium. After the tour of New Zealand in 2014/15 season, Pradeep showcased his bowling abilities, which sealed him in the permanent spot in Test squad. He became a bowling partner of Dhammika Prasad in Test cricket.

He was also known for being stranded in a famous test match draw against England at Lord's in June 2014, where he batted to save the test match for Sri Lanka with just one wicket left. He survived five deliveries in the final over of the match bowled by Stuart Broad.

On 5 July 2016 he made his Twenty20 International (T20I) debut for Sri Lanka against England.

On 28 December 2016 he took the 10,000th lbw in Test cricket, when he dismissed Hashim Amla during Sri Lanka's tour to South Africa. However, Pradeep was injured during the second T20I against South Africa and was sent to Sri Lanka.

After injury, Pradeep was re-called for the India tour in July 2017. In the first match of the series, he took his maiden Test five-wicket haul at Galle International Stadium. His bowling performance in the match was highly praised by commentators as well. However, finally Sri Lanka lost the match by 304 runs. However, during the day two of second test, Pradeep was injured and did not bowl further throughout the match. He did bat in both innings, but was released from the remaining matches of the series.

on 13 December 2017, during the second ODI against India at Mohali, Pradeep conceded 106 runs in his 10 overs. This is the worst bowling figures by a Sri Lankan in ODIs and joint third-most by a bowler in an ODI. In the match, Rohit Sharma scored his third ODI double century and Sri Lanka lost the match by 141 runs. He was also part of the Sri Lankan team at the 2017 ICC Champions Trophy.

In May 2018, he was one of 33 cricketers to be awarded a national contract by Sri Lanka Cricket ahead of the 2018–19 season.

He was included for the ODI squad for the Scotland tour prior to World Cup in 2019. In the second ODI, he took a four-wicket haul by restricting Scottish total to 199. Sri Lanka won the match by 35 runs in DLS method. Pradeep won his first man of the match award for the bowling performance.

In April 2019, he was named in Sri Lanka's squad for the 2019 Cricket World Cup. During second match in the World Cup, Pradeep delivered a match-winning bowling spell against Afghanistan to take four wickets for 31 runs. Sri Lanka won the match by 34 runs, with Pradeep was named man of the match. However, Pradeep was ruled out of Sri Lanka's last two matches of the tournament, after contracting chickenpox. He was replaced by Kasun Rajitha.

In the third ODI against West Indies on 1 March 2020, Pradeep bowled only 4.3 overs in Pallkelle, after injuring his hamstring. He did not com back to the field after the injury. Therefore, he is out for at least six weeks and missed the T20I series against West Indies and Tests against England.

In September 2021, Pradeep was named in Sri Lanka's squad for the 2021 ICC Men's T20 World Cup.

== Personal life ==
Pradeep is married to his longtime partner, Nilakshi Champika. Their wedding was celebrated on 7 May 2015.
