= Tharanga Paranavitana =

Sri Lankan cricketer

Personal information
- Full name: Nishad Tharanga Paranavitana
- Born: 15 April 1982 (age 44); Kegalle, Sri Lanka
- Nickname: Moraa
- Height: 6 ft 1 in (1.85 m)
- Batting: Left-handed
- Bowling: Right-arm off-break
- Role: Batsman

International information
- National side: Sri Lanka (2009–2012)
- Test debut (cap 111): 21 February 2009 v Pakistan
- Last Test: 25 November 2012 v New Zealand

Domestic team information
- Years: Team
- 2001/02–present: Sinhalese Sports Club

Career statistics
Competition	Test	FC	LA	T20
Matches	32	222	130	29
Runs scored	1,792	14,940	4,620	642
Batting average	32.58	45.82	42.77	23.77
100s/50s	5/11	40/69	8/30	0/5
Top score	111	236	118	67*
Balls bowled	102	2,902	1,178	96
Wickets	1	37	20	4
Bowling average	86.00	40.70	47.60	29.25
5 wickets in innings	0	0	0	0
10 wickets in match	0	0	0	0
Best bowling	1/26	4/39	4/25	1/3
Catches/stumpings	27/–	216/–	68/–	12/–
- Source: Cricinfo, 27 November 2016

Nishad Tharanga Paranavitana (born 15 April 1982) is a former Sri Lankan Test cricketer. He is an opening batsman and an off-break bowler. He retired from all forms of cricket in August 2020.

== Domestic career ==
He was a pust pupil at St. Mary's College, Kegalle and made the most runs in the 2015–16 Premier League Tournament, with a total of 953 from 10 matches and 17 innings.

In March 2018, he was named in Kandy's squad for the 2017–18 Super Four Provincial Tournament. The following month, he was also named in Kandy's squad for the 2018 Super Provincial One Day Tournament.

== International career ==
He made his international debut in a Test match against Pakistan in February 2009. During the second Test match of that series, while heading for the third day's play, he became one of the Sri Lankan cricketers wounded when their team bus was attacked by terrorists in Lahore, Pakistan.

Despite being attacked and badly injured, Paranavitana recovered to register his maiden Test century sixteen months later on 18 July 2010 against India at Galle, Sri Lanka. He was dropped from the Test team at the end of 2011, being replaced by Lahiru Thirimanne for Sri Lanka's third Test of their tour of South Africa.

Paranavitana scored two centuries in Test matches. The first, a score of 111, was made against India at Galle in July 2010. The second came in the same month in the following match of India's tour of Sri Lanka, Paranavitana scoring exactly 100 runs.
