= Dhammika Prasad =

Former Sri Lankan cricketer

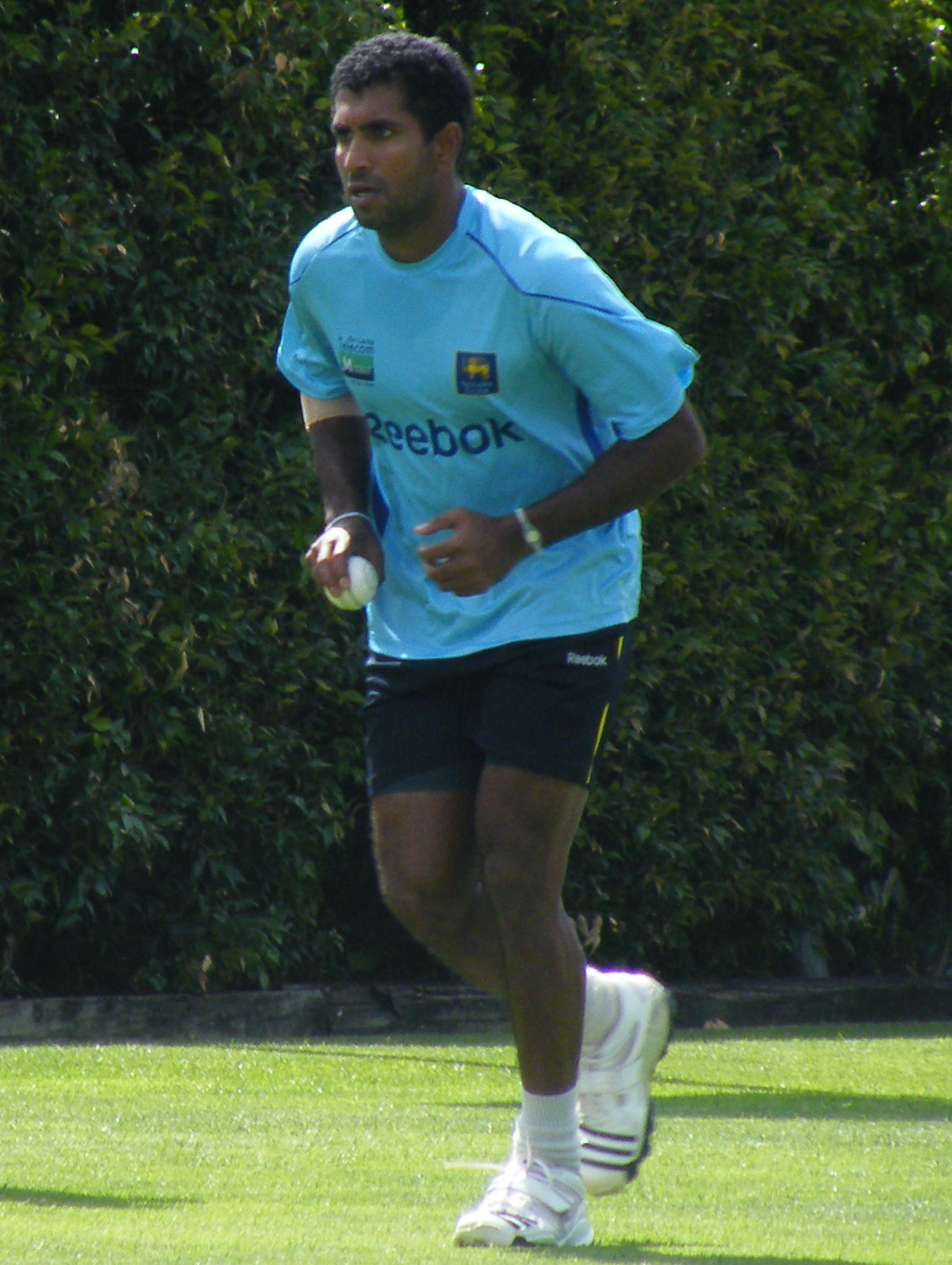

Personal information
- Full name: Kariyawasam Tirana Gamage Dhammika Prasad
- Born: 30 May 1983 (age 43); Ragama, Sri Lanka
- Nickname: Dammi
- Height: 5 ft 10 in (1.78 m)
- Batting: Right-handed
- Bowling: Right arm fast-medium
- Role: Bowler

International information
- National side: Sri Lanka (2006–2015)
- Test debut (cap 110): 8 August 2008 v India
- Last Test: 22 October 2015 v West Indies
- ODI debut (cap 130): 25 February 2006 v Bangladesh
- Last ODI: 25 January 2015 v New Zealand
- Only T20I (cap 41): 6 August 2011 v Australia

Domestic team information
- Years: Team
- 2002/03–present: Sinhalese Sports Club
- Basnahira North

Career statistics
Competition	Test	ODI	T20I	FC
Matches	25	24	1	131
Runs scored	476	129	–	2505
Batting average	12.86	21.50	–	17.27
100s/50s	0/0	0/0	–	1/9
Top score	47	31*	–	103*
Balls bowled	4,327	1,015	18	16,636
Wickets	75	32	0	351
Bowling average	35.97	30.50	–	29.18
5 wickets in innings	1	0	–	6
10 wickets in match	0	0	–	1
Best bowling	5/50	3/17	–	6/25
Catches/stumpings	6/–	1/–	0/–	33/–
- Source: Cricinfo, 4 April 2025

Kariyawasam Tirana Gamage Dhammika Prasad (Sinhala: ධම්මික ප්‍රසාද්; born 30 May 1983), or simply Dhammika Prasad, is a Sri Lankan former cricketer and coach. He was most recently the bowling coach of the Nepal national cricket team. He is a right-arm fast-medium bowler. He has represented Sri Lanka in Test, One Day International (ODI) and Twenty20 cricket and played domestic cricket for the Sinhalese Sports Club and Basnahira North.

Prasad has been continuously dropped from the squads due to many injuries to ankle, back, hamstrings and has not played any cricket after the West Indies tour in 2015. In February 2021, he announced his retirement from international cricket at the age of 37.

== Domestic career ==
Having begun playing cricket as a top-order batsman, Prasad became a fast bowler in his late teens and played in the 2002 Under-19 World Cup.

== International career ==
In February 2006, he was called up to Sri Lanka's ODI and Test squads for the tour of Bangladesh after bowling at an average of less than 23 runs per wicket in the domestic first class cricket. He made his ODI debut on that tour, taking 2/29 in a 78-run win over Bangladesh in Chittagong.

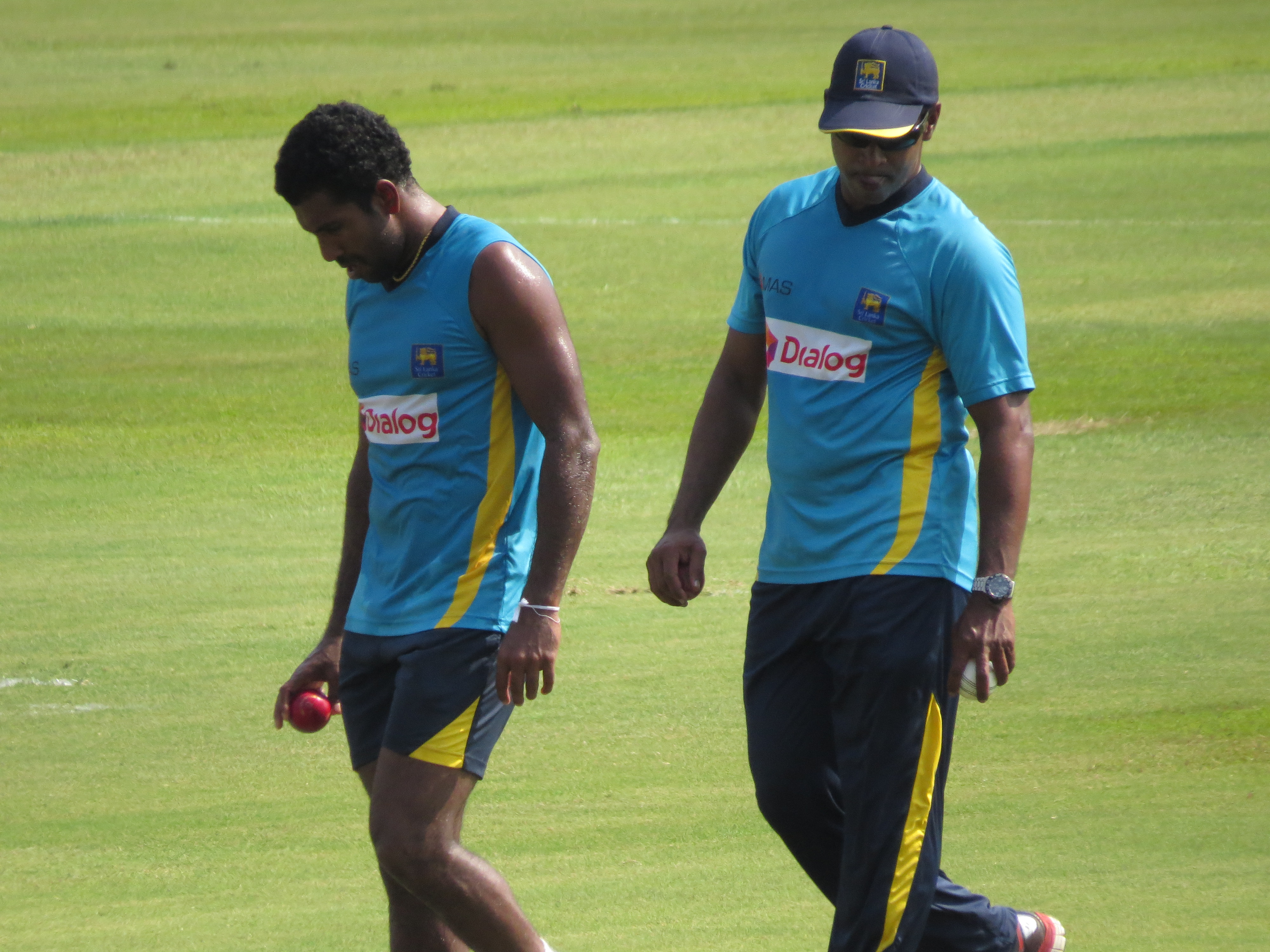
Dhammika Prasad getting some tips from Chaminda Vaas

Prasad's international career was subsequently affected by a back injury. He had to wait until August 2008 to make his Test debut, taking five wickets over both innings of the third Test of India's tour of Sri Lanka, including those of Sachin Tendulkar, who Prasad said was his favourite player, Rahul Dravid, and Virender Sehwag. He played Test cricket sporadically over the following seasons. He took four wickets in the first Test of Sri Lanka's tour of Bangladesh in December 2008, but was dropped for the second Test.

In 2009, he played in the second Test of Sri Lanka's home series against New Zealand and the first Test of Sri Lanka's tour of India, in which he injured his hamstring. In 2010, Prasad played in one Test against India and another against the West Indies, failing to take any wickets on either occasion.

In June 2011, Prasad was recalled to Sri Lanka's ODI squad for the tour of England and Scotland. He played in two ODIs on the tour, taking two wickets against England and three against Scotland. He was named in the Test squad for Australia's tour of Sri Lanka in August and September, but did not play. He did, however, make his international Twenty20 debut against Australia, before playing in two Tests of Sri Lanka's series against Pakistan in the United Arab Emirates. He was called into Sri Lanka's squad for their tour of South Africa in 2011–12 as a replacement for injured bowlers. He played in the third and deciding Test of the series, which Sri Lanka lost, taking two wickets for 156 runs, and also played in two ODIs.

He was part of Sri Lanka test team which secured their historic first ever test series win against England in England in 2014. He played a crucial role during the series win picking up fifer at Headingley and ended up with career best figures of 5/50.

Prasad was selected for the 2015 Cricket World Cup original squad, but was unable play due to injury. So he was called off from the World Cup squad.

After World Cup, Prasad was brought back into the squad for Test series against Pakistan. In the second Test, he showed an impressive bowling performance where he took 3 for 43 in the first innings and then 4 for 92 in second innings. Due to Sri Lanka loss in the first Test at Galle, the second Test was a must win for the Sri Lankan team to level the series. Prasad provided the basis for the win and he earned the man of the match award for his impressive bowling performance in the second Test at P Sara Oval.

During the India Test tour in 2015, Prasad showed immense talent with the new ball, where he used to take up the wickets in very first over in each Test match getting rid of Indian top order. He was the highest wicket taker for Sri Lanka in the series with 15 wickets. Due to some heated altercations with Indian pacer Ishant Sharma during the series, he was given a warning by ICC during the third test.

== Personal life ==
Prasad attended De Mazenod College in Kandana, where he started playing cricket as a top order batsman. He is married to Nihari Kariyawasam. On 24 August 2016 Prasad announced on his Twitter account that he and his wife were parents to a baby boy.
