= Kaushal Silva =

Sri Lankan cricketer

Personal information
- Full name: Jayan Kaushal Silva
- Born: 27 May 1986 (age 40); Colombo, Sri Lanka
- Height: 5 ft 5 in (1.65 m)
- Batting: Right-handed
- Role: Wicket-keeper/Opening Batsman

International information
- National side: Sri Lanka (2011–2018)
- Test debut (cap 120): 26 October 2011 v Pakistan
- Last Test: 14 November 2018 v England

Domestic team information
- Years: Team
- Sinhalese Sports Club
- Basnahira North

Career statistics
Competition	Test	FC	LA	T20
Matches	37	188	133	30
Runs scored	2,058	12,114	3,615	404
Batting average	29.40	44.70	41.55	22.44
100s/50s	3/12	35/51	5/21	0/2
Top score	139	225	126	60*
Balls bowled	–	42	–	–
Wickets	–	1	–	–
Bowling average	–	33.00	–	–
5 wickets in innings	–	0	–	–
10 wickets in match	–	0	–	–
Best bowling	–	1/11	–	–
Catches/stumpings	33/1	360/47	142/39	15/17
- Source: ESPN Cricinfo, 14 November 2018

Jayan Kaushal Silva (born 27 May 1986), or Kaushal Silva, is a professional Sri Lankan Test cricketer. Educated at Sri Sumangala College Panadura & S.Thomas’ College, Mount Lavinia

He plays for the Sinhalese Sports Club and the Sri Lankan national team. He made his first class debut in the 2001/02 season. He is a right-handed wicket-keeper batsman.

== Early career ==
Silva started off his cricketing career at S. Thomas' College, Mount Lavinia, where he Captained the First XI team in the historic 125th The Battle of the Blues. During his school career he showed his ability to scoring big runs consistently during the seasons and his knack for putting up fighting, gritty innings. Silva received strong support from his father, a well recognized cricket coach, and credits him for the solid batting technique he has developed.

== Domestic career ==
In March 2018, he was named in Colombo's squad for the 2017–18 Super Four Provincial Tournament. He was the leading run-scorer for Sinhalese Sports Club in the 2018–19 Premier League Tournament, with 950 runs in eight matches. In February 2019, Sri Lanka Cricket named him as the Best Batsman in the 2017–18 Premier League Tournament.

== International career ==
After being a member of the Sri Lanka A side since 2009, Silva made his Test debut in October 2011 in a series against Pakistan. He was selected for Sri Lanka's tour of South Africa at the end of 2011, but was dropped after the First Test.

He scored his maiden test hundred against Bangladesh on 27 January 2014 at Dhaka.

During the Australian tour in 2016, Silva was struggling to score runs, where he was out for single-digit scores in all of his first 4 innings. The opening partnership often fell in the first few overs, where his counterpart Dimuth Karunaratne also struggled in form. In his first five innings of this series, he scored only 12 runs. During the second innings of Third test at SSC however, he scored his third century - 115 off 269 balls, giving the team a strong lead. Sri Lanka comprehensively won the match by 163 runs, to whitewash Australia for the first time.

After South African tour in late 2016, Silva was dropped from the squad due to poor performances. On 25 September 2017, Silva was re-called into the test squad for Pakistan series in UAE and played the first match back again as the opener. However, he scored only 12 and 25 in the two innings, Sri Lanka won the match by 21 runs with Rangana Herath heroics.

In May 2018, he was one of 33 cricketers to be awarded a national contract by Sri Lanka Cricket ahead of the 2018–19 season.

== Personal life ==
Kaushal Silva is married to a Sri Lankan teledrama actress and a singer, Bhagya Hettiarachchi. The wedding was held on 18 April 2014 at JAIC Hilton, Colombo.

== Head injury ==
On 24 April 2016, Kaushal was struck on the head during a practice match at Pallekele cricket stadium. He was immediately airlifted to a Colombo hospital and scans suggested that no real danger occurred by the hit. He was fielded at short leg, when he struck with the ball in the back of the head. However, next day he was discharged and he recovered quickly from bruises and mild injuries.
