= Chanaka Welegedara =

Sri Lankan cricketer

Chanaka Welegedara චානක වෙලගෙදර
Personal information
- Full name: Uda Walawwe Mahim Bandaralage Chanaka Asanka Welegedara
- Born: 20 March 1981 (age 45); Matale, Sri Lanka
- Nickname: Wele
- Height: 5 ft 11 in (1.80 m)
- Batting: Right-handed
- Bowling: Left arm fast-medium
- Role: Bowler

International information
- National side: Sri Lanka (2007–2014)
- Test debut (cap 107): 18 December 2007 v England
- Last Test: 14 August 2014 v Pakistan
- ODI debut (cap 138): 15 December 2009 v India
- Last ODI: 22 June 2010 v India
- T20I debut (cap 34): 30 April 2010 v New Zealand
- Last T20I: 9 May 2010 v Australia

Domestic team information
- Years: Team
- 2007/08–present: Moors Sports Club
- 2012/–present: Wayamba
- 2016-present: Tamil Union

Career statistics
Competition	Test	ODI	T20I	LA
Matches	21	10	2	86
Runs scored	218	4	2	109
Batting average	9.08	4.00	–	5.45
100s/50s	0/0	0/0	0/0	0/0
Top score	48	2*	2*	18*
Balls bowled	3,799	457	36	3,706
Wickets	55	15	1	121
Bowling average	41.32	28.86	61.00	24.90
5 wickets in innings	2	1	0	3
10 wickets in match	0	0	0	0
Best bowling	5/52	5/66	1/21	5/16
Catches/stumpings	5/–	2/–	0/–	20/–
- Source: Cricinfo, 13 February 2015

Uda Walawwe Mahim Bandaralage Chanaka Asanka Welegedara, commonly as Chanaka Welegedara, (Sinhala: චානක වෙලගෙදර; born 20 March 1981), is a former Sri Lankan international cricketer who played all formats of the game.

== Early career ==
An alumnus of St. Thomas' College, Matale and Maliyadeva College, Kurunegala, he proved the future prospects of entering national side with his bowling performances at school level. A left-arm fast-medium bowler, he had a healthy bowling average in both first-class and List A cricket, in the mid-to-low 20s. He has made appearances for Moors Sports Club and North Central Province's cricket club, and was called up for the Sri Lanka A squad for the match against Bangladesh during Sri Lanka's 2007 tour.

== Legacy ==
On 6 April 2015, Welagedera recorded the best economical spell of Twenty20 cricket history against Sinhalese Sports Club. His spell finished with 4 overs, 2 maidens, four wickets for just two runs (4-2-2-4), breaking the 4-3-2-2 spell of South African Chris Morris. The record was later broken by Pakistani pacer Mohammad Irfan with the figures of 4-3-1-2.

== Early career ==
An alumnus of St. Thomas' College, Matale, he proved the future prospects of entering national side with his bowling performances in school level. A left-arm fast bowler by trade, he has a healthy bowling average in both first-class and List A cricket, in the mid-to-low 20s. He has made appearances for Moors Sports Club and North Central Province's cricket club, and was called up for the Sri Lanka A squad for the match against Bangladesh during Sri Lanka's 2007 tour. He made his Twenty20 debut on 17 August 2004, for Moors Sports Club in the 2004 SLC Twenty20 Tournament.

== Legacy ==
On 6 April 2015, Welagedera recorded the best economical spell of Twenty20 cricket history against Sinhalese Sports Club. His spell finished with 4 overs, 2 maidens, four wickets for just two runs (4-2-2-4), breaking the 4-3-2-2 spell of South African Chris Morris. The record was later broken by Pakistani pacer Mohammad Irfan with 4-3-1-2 figures.

== International career ==
On 18 December 2007, he made his Test match debut in the third test against England at Galle. Welagedara was selected in Sri Lanka's test squad for their 2008 tour of the West Indies, but had to wait until November 2009 for his second Test appearance, which came against India, and he would go on to play all three Tests in the series. His first Test wicket was England's Paul Collingwood.

He was included in Sri Lanka's One Day International squad to play against India in December 2009, making his debut on 15 December in Rajkot, and in a match where 825 runs were scored in 100 overs, he returned figures of 2/63 from his ten overs, claiming the wickets of Virender Sehwag and Virat Kohli. He also claimed a five wicket haul against India.

He was the first Test cricketer to boast six initials to his name. He played as constant player in the Sri Lankan Playing XI for 6 years after Lasith Malinga's resignation from the longer format.

== Post Test Cricket ==
Welegedara moved to Australia in 2015 and started playing for a local Victorian Cricket team Westmeadows, for the 2015/16 Australian Cricket season. In his first season, he finished with figures of 146 overs, 27 maidens, 34 wickets, at an average of 13.38. Moving into the next season he has been made coach of Westmeadows.

== See also ==
- List of St. Thomas' College, Matale alumni
