= Sobers–Tissera Trophy =

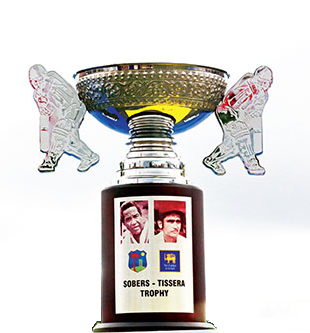
- Countries: West Indies; Sri Lanka
- Administrator: Cricket West Indies; Sri Lanka Cricket
- Format: Test cricket
- First edition: 2015–16
- Latest edition: 2026
- Next edition: TBD
- Tournament format: Test Series
- Number of teams: 2
- Current trophy holder: West Indies (2026)
- Most successful: Sri Lanka (2 series wins)
- Most runs: (Cricket West Indies) Shane Dowrich (288)
- Most wickets: (Cricket West Indies) Shannon Gabriel (20)

The Sobers–Tissera Trophy is a cricket trophy, awarded to the winners of Test series between West Indies and Sri Lanka. It was first awarded following the 2015–16 series between the sides. The trophy is named after Sir Garfield Sobers and Michael Tissera, prominent cricketers of old from the two countries.

The first Sobers–Tissera Trophy was lifted by Sri Lanka in 2015, winning comfortably by an innings and 6 runs, and 72 runs in the first and second tests respectfully. Since the first series between the two nations, Sri Lanka has dominated the West Indies, winning two out of the four series, with the other two being drawn. In 2026, West Indies won the series by 1–0 and claimed their maiden trophy.

== Background ==
The West Indies Cricket Board and Sri Lanka Cricket announced that all future bilateral tours of West Indies and Sri Lanka to be named as Garfield Sobers–Michael Tissera series. Sobers exploits with bat and ball made him regarded as one of the greatest all-rounders in the history of the game. Tissera, a right-hand batsman and leg-spin bowler, played in the same era as Sobers, but his career was limited to playing first-class cricket, as Sri Lanka was not an ICC full member nation and therefore did not play Test cricket, where Tissera lead the Ceylon team to win the famous victory against India in India.

== List of Sobers–Tissera Trophy series ==
Total Series	West Indies	Sri Lanka	Drawn
5	1	2	2

Series	Years	Host	Tests	West Indies	Sri Lanka	Drawn	Player of the Series	Series result	Holder at series end
1	2015–16	Sri Lanka	2	0	2	0	(Sri Lanka) Rangana Herath	Sri Lanka	Sri Lanka
2	2018	West Indies	3	1	1	1	(Cricket West Indies) Shane Dowrich	Drawn	Sri Lanka
3	2021	West Indies	2	0	0	2	(Sri Lanka) Suranga Lakmal	Drawn	Sri Lanka
4	2021–22	Sri Lanka	2	0	2	0	(Sri Lanka) Ramesh Mendis	Sri Lanka	Sri Lanka
5	2026	West Indies	2	1	0	1	(Cricket West Indies) Justin Greaves	West Indies	West Indies
Total			11	2	5	4			

== Match venues ==
In Sri Lanka
Stadium	Province	First Test	Last Test	Played	Sri Lanka wins	Draws*	West Indies wins	Ref
Galle International Stadium, Galle	Southern Province	2015–16	2021–22	3	3	0	0	
P Sara Oval, Colombo	Western Province	2015–16	2015–16	1	1	0	0	
In West Indies
Stadium	Country	First Test	Last Test	Played	West Indies wins	Draws*	Sri Lanka wins	Ref
Sir Vivian Richards Stadium, Antigua	Antigua and Barbuda	2021	2026	4	1	3	0	
Queen's Park Oval, Port of Spain	Trinidad and Tobago	2018	2018	1	1	0	0	
Daren Sammy Cricket Ground, Gros Islet	Saint Lucia	2018	2018	1	0	1	0	
Kensington Oval, Bridgetown	Barbados	2018	2018	1	0	0	1	

== See also ==
- Warne–Muralitharan Trophy
