= Sri Lankan cricket team in the West Indies in 2018 =

International cricket tour

	West Indies	Sri Lanka
- Dates: 30 May – 27 June 2018
Captains	Jason Holder	Dinesh Chandimal (Note: Dinesh Chandimal was suspended for the final Test with Suranga Lakmal named as his replacement.)

Test series
- Result: 3-match series drawn 1–1
Most runs	Shane Dowrich (288)	Kusal Mendis (285)
Most wickets	Shannon Gabriel (20)	Lahiru Kumara (17)
- Player of the series: Shane Dowrich (WI)

The Sri Lankan cricket team toured the West Indies in June 2018 to play three Test matches. The series was played for Sobers–Tissera Trophy. The tour featured Sri Lanka's first Test matches in the West Indies since April 2008 and included their first Test match at the Kensington Oval. The Test match at the Kensington Oval also became the first day/night Test to be played in the West Indies. Ahead of the Test matches, there was a three-day tour match. The Test series was drawn 1–1.

On 19 May 2018, Cricket West Indies (CWI) announced that they may scrap one of the Test fixtures, replacing it with a couple of one-day matches. However, the day before the first Test, the International Cricket Council (ICC) confirmed that it would be a three-match Test series.

Prior to the start of day three of the second Test, the Sri Lankan cricket team protested against umpires' decision on starting the third day's play with a new ball, replacing the old ball. The Sri Lankan cricket team, led by Dinesh Chandimal, refused to take to the field on the third day of the Test, after showing its disagreement on changing the ball, causing play to be delayed by two hours. The ICC charged Chandimal with the offense of "changing the condition of the ball". Chandimal pled not guilty to the charge. Ahead of the third fixture, the ICC suspended him for one Test match, with Chandimal appealing against the decision. The ICC dismissed Chandimal's appeal, and the one-match ban was upheld. Sri Lanka Cricket (SLC) named Suranga Lakmal as the captain for the third Test of the series in Chandimal's absence. He became the sixteenth player to captain Sri Lanka in a Test match.

== Squads ==
West Indies	Sri Lanka
Jason Holder (c); Devendra Bishoo; Kraigg Brathwaite; Roston Chase; Miguel Cummins; Shane Dowrich (wk); Shannon Gabriel; Jahmar Hamilton (wk); Shimron Hetmyer; Shai Hope; Keemo Paul; Kieran Powell; Kemar Roach; Devon Smith	Dinesh Chandimal (c); Akila Dananjaya; Dhananjaya de Silva; Niroshan Dickwella (wk); Asitha Fernando; Lahiru Gamage; Danushka Gunathilaka; Rangana Herath; Lahiru Kumara; Suranga Lakmal; Angelo Mathews; Kusal Mendis; Dilruwan Perera; Kusal Perera; Kasun Rajitha; Dasun Shanaka; Roshen Silva; Mahela Udawatte; Jeffrey Vandersay

Ahead of the tour, Dhananjaya de Silva initially withdrew from the Sri Lankan squad following the death of his father. However, he returned to the squad ahead of the first Test. Prior to the second Test, Angelo Mathews and Lahiru Gamage were ruled out of Sri Lanka's squad for the rest of the series (on account of personal reasons, and a fractured finger, respectively) and were replaced by Danushka Gunathilaka and Dasun Shanaka. Shimron Hetmyer was ruled out of the final Test due to illness, with Keemo Paul replacing him in West Indies' squad. Before the third and final Test, Sri Lanka's Jeffrey Vandersay was sent home due to conduct issues.

== Tour match ==
=== Three-day match: West Indies President's XI vs Sri Lanka ===
30 May–1 June 2018
Scorecard

Sri Lanka	v	West Indies President's XI
428 (119.4 overs); Dinesh Chandimal 108 (216); Jomel Warrican 4/81 (29.4 overs)		272 (77 overs); John Campbell 62 (52); Akila Dananjaya 3/46 (20 overs)
135/0 (33 overs); Kusal Mendis 60* (113)

Match drawn
Brian Lara Cricket Ground, Trinidad
Umpires: Nigel Duguid (WI) and Joel Wilson (WI)

- Sri Lanka won the toss and elected to bat.

== Test series ==
=== 1st Test ===
6–10 June 2018
Scorecard

West Indies	v	Sri Lanka
414/8d (154 overs); Shane Dowrich 125* (325); Lahiru Kumara 4/94 (35 overs)		185 (55.4 overs); Dinesh Chandimal 44 (121); Miguel Cummins 3/39 (12.4 overs)
223/7d (72 overs); Kieran Powell 88 (127); Lahiru Kumara 3/40 (9 overs)		226 (83.2 overs); Kusal Mendis 102 (210); Roston Chase 4/15 (8.2 overs)

West Indies won by 226 runs
Queen's Park Oval, Port of Spain
Umpires: Aleem Dar (Pak) and Richard Kettleborough (Eng)
Player of the match: Shane Dowrich (WI)

- West Indies won the toss and elected to bat.
- Only 9.3 overs of play was possible before lunch on day 2 due to rain.

=== 2nd Test ===
14–18 June 2018
Scorecard

Sri Lanka	v	West Indies
253 (79 overs); Dinesh Chandimal 119* (186); Shannon Gabriel 5/59 (16 overs)		300 (100.3 overs); Devon Smith 61 (176); Lahiru Kumara 4/86 (26.3 overs)
342 (91.4 overs); Kusal Mendis 87 (117); Shannon Gabriel 8/62 (20.4 overs)		147/5 (60.3 overs); Kraigg Brathwaite 59* (172); Kasun Rajitha 2/23 (13 overs)

Match drawn
Daren Sammy Cricket Ground, Gros Islet
Umpires: Aleem Dar (Pak) and Ian Gould (Eng)
Player of the match: Shannon Gabriel (WI)

- Sri Lanka won the toss and elected to bat.
- Only 42.3 overs of play was possible on day 2 due to rain.
- Kasun Rajitha and Mahela Udawatte (SL) both made their Test debuts.
- Kemar Roach (WI) took his 150th wicket in Tests.
- Shannon Gabriel (WI) took both his first ten-wicket match haul and his 100th wicket in Tests.

=== 3rd Test ===
23–27 June 2018 (Note: While five days of play were scheduled for the Test, the match reached a result in four days.) (D/N)
Scorecard

West Indies	v	Sri Lanka
204 (69.3 overs); Jason Holder 74 (123); Lahiru Kumara 4/58 (23.3 overs)		154 (59 overs); Niroshan Dickwella 42 (72); Jason Holder 4/19 (16 overs)
93 (31.2 overs); Kemar Roach 23* (37); Kasun Rajitha 3/20 (8 overs)		144/6 (40.2 overs); Kusal Perera 28* (43); Jason Holder 5/41 (14.2 overs)

Sri Lanka won by 4 wickets
Kensington Oval, Bridgetown
Umpires: Ian Gould (Eng) and Richard Kettleborough (Eng)
Player of the match: Jason Holder (WI)

- West Indies won the toss and elected to bat.
- Only 46.3 and 59 overs of play were possible on day 1 and day 2 respectively due to rain.
- This was the first day/night Test to be played in the West Indies.
- Suranga Lakmal captained Sri Lanka for the first time in Tests.
