= West Indian cricket team in Sri Lanka in 2015–16 =

International cricket tour

	Sri Lanka	West Indies
- Dates: 4 October 2015 – 11 November 2015
Captains	Angelo Mathews (Tests, ODIs); Lasith Malinga (T20Is)	Jason Holder (Tests, ODIs); Daren Sammy (T20Is)

Test series
- Result: Sri Lanka won the 2-match series 2–0
Most runs	Dimuth Karunaratne (199)	Darren Bravo (144)
Most wickets	Rangana Herath (15)	Kraigg Brathwaite (6); Jomel Warrican (6); Jerome Taylor (6)
- Player of the series: Rangana Herath (SL)

One Day International series
- Results: Sri Lanka won the 3-match series 3–0
Most runs	Kusal Perera (163)	Marlon Samuels (175)
Most wickets	Suranga Lakmal (6)	Sunil Narine (4)
- Player of the series: Kusal Perera (SL)

Twenty20 International series
- Results: 2-match series drawn 1–1
Most runs	Tillakaratne Dilshan (108)	Andre Fletcher (80)
Most wickets	Sachithra Senanayake (4); Lasith Malinga (4)	Dwayne Bravo (4)
- Player of the series: Tillakaratne Dilshan (SL)

The West Indies cricket team toured Sri Lanka in October/November 2015 to play two Tests, three One Day Internationals (ODIs) and two Twenty20 International (T20I) matches. Starting with this series, all bilateral Test tours between the West Indies and Sri Lanka will be called the Sobers–Tissera Trophy. Sri Lanka won the Test series 2–0, the ODI series 3–0 with the T20I series was drawn 1–1.

The whole series was rain affected and the play was interrupted on numerous occasions. All three matches in the ODI series were rain interrupted and the results were all determined by the Duckworth–Lewis–Stern method.

The second T20I match, which was originally scheduled to be held on 12 November 2015 was rescheduled and was held on 11 November at the R Premadasa Stadium, after discussions with the relevant Cricket Boards of the two nations. The T20I was rescheduled as 12 November was declared a national day of mourning by the government, due to the death of Venerable Maduluwawe Sobitha Thero, with Thero's funeral being held on the 12th. Also, there was a minute of silence prior to the match and the Sri Lankan cricketers wore a yellow band on their arms as a gesture of respect.

== Squads ==
Tests		ODIs		T20I	
Sri Lanka	West Indies	Sri Lanka	West Indies	Sri Lanka	West Indies
Angelo Mathews (c); Lahiru Thirimanne (vc); Dushmantha Chameera; Dinesh Chandimal; Rangana Herath; Dimuth Karunaratne; Tharindu Kaushal; Suranga Lakmal; Kusal Mendis; Dilruwan Perera; Kusal Perera(wk); Nuwan Pradeep; Dhammika Prasad; Kaushal Silva; Milinda Siriwardana	Jason Holder (c); Kraigg Brathwaite (vc); Devendra Bishoo; Jermaine Blackwood; Carlos Brathwaite; Darren Bravo; Rajindra Chandrika; Shane Dowrich; Shannon Gabriel; Shai Hope; Denesh Ramdin (wk); Kemar Roach; Marlon Samuels; Jerome Taylor; Jomel Warrican	Angelo Mathews(c); Lahiru Thirimanne (vc); Dushmantha Chameera; Dinesh Chandimal; Tillakaratne Dilshan; Danushka Gunathilaka; Shehan Jayasuriya; Nuwan Kulasekara; Suranga Lakmal; Lasith Malinga; Ajantha Mendis; Kusal Perera (wk); Sachithra Senanayake; Milinda Siriwardana; Jeffrey Vandersay	Jason Holder (c); Devendra Bishoo; Jermaine Blackwood; Carlos Brathwaite; Darren Bravo; Jonathan Carter; Johnson Charles; Andre Fletcher; Jason Mohammed; Sunil Narine; Denesh Ramdin; Ravi Rampaul; Andre Russell; Marlon Samuels; Jerome Taylor	Lasith Malinga (c); Tillakaratne Dilshan; Kusal Perera (wk); Shehan Jayasuriya; Angelo Mathews; Milinda Siriwardene; Chamara Kapugedera; Dinesh Chandimal; Kithuruwan Vithanage; Dushmantha Chameera; Nuwan Kulasekara; Sachithra Senanayake; Jeffrey Vandersay; Binura Fernando; Thisara Perera	Daren Sammy (c); ~~Samuel Badree~~; Darren Bravo; Dwayne Bravo; Jonathan Carter; Johnson Charles; Andre Fletcher; Jason Holder; Sunil Narine; Kieron Pollard; Denesh Ramdin; Ravi Rampaul; Andre Russell; Marlon Samuels; Jerome Taylor; Devendra Bishoo

West Indies bowler Samuel Badree was ruled out of the T20I series after contracting dengue fever. He was replaced by Devendra Bishoo.

== Tour matches ==
=== Tour match: Sri Lanka Board President's XI vs West Indians ===
9–11 October
Scorecard

West Indians	v	Sri Lanka Board President's XI
209 (65.3 overs); Carlos Brathwaite 54 (46); Suraj Randiv 5/73 (23 overs)		455/6 (107 overs); Udara Jayasundera 142 (216); Jason Holder 2/54 (16 overs)

Match drawn
Sinhalese Sports Club Ground, Colombo
Umpires: Deepal Gunawardene (SL) and Rohitha Kottahachchi (SL)

- West Indians won the toss and elected to bat.
- The start of day 1 was delayed because of a wet outfield.
- The start of the match was postponed by one day because of rain.
- Fifteen players per side (11 batting, 11 fielding).

=== One day: Sri Lanka Board President's XI vs West Indians ===
29 October
09.30
Scorecard

West Indians; 318 (48.4 overs)	v	Sri Lanka Board President's XI; 103/3 (21 overs)
Carlos Brathwaite 113 (58); Binura Fernando 3/71 (9.4 overs)		Lahiru Thirimanne 41 (48); Andre Russell 1/20 (4 overs)

West Indians won by 43 runs (DLS method)
Colts Cricket Club Ground, Colombo
Umpires: Prageeth Rambukwella (SL) and Raveendra Wimalasiri (SL)

- Sri Lanka Board President's XI won the toss and elected to field.

== Test series (Sobers-Tissera Trophy) ==
=== 1st Test ===
14–18 October
Scorecard

Sri Lanka	v	West Indies
484 (152.3 overs); Dimuth Karunaratne 186 (354); Devendra Bishoo 4/143 (40.3 overs)		251 (82 overs); Darren Bravo 50 (107); Rangana Herath 6/68 (33 overs)
		227(f/o) (68.3 overs); Jermaine Blackwood 92 (135); Rangana Herath 4/79 (22 overs)

Sri Lanka won by an innings and 6 runs
Galle International Stadium, Galle
Umpires: Marais Erasmus (SA) and Richard Illingworth (Eng)
Player of the match: Rangana Herath (SL)

- Sri Lanka won the toss and elected to bat.
- Milinda Siriwardana (SL) made his Test debut.
- The 238 runs stand for the third wicket by Dimuth Karunaratne and Dinesh Chandimal is the highest third wicket partnership for Sri Lanka in Tests at Galle.
- Rangana Herath took his 23rd Test five-wicket haul. This is Herath's first five-wicket haul against the West Indies.

=== 2nd Test ===
22–26 October
Scorecard

Sri Lanka	v	West Indies
200 (66 overs); Milinda Siriwardana 68 (111); Jomel Warrican 4/67 (20 overs)		163 (64.2 overs); Kraigg Brathwaite 47 (101); Dhammika Prasad 4/34 (12 overs)
206 (75.3 overs); Angelo Mathews 46 (120); Kraigg Brathwaite 6/29 (11.3 overs)		171 (65.5 overs); Darren Bravo 61 (134); Rangana Herath 4/56 (19.5 overs)

Sri Lanka won by 72 runs
P Sara Oval, Colombo
Umpires: Simon Fry (Aus) and Rod Tucker (Aus)
Player of the match: Milinda Siriwardana (SL)

- Sri Lanka won the toss and elected to bat.
- The match was delayed by 30 minutes on the morning of the second day because of a wet outfield.
- Rain stopped play just before tea on the third day, with play being abandoned for the day.
- No play was possible on day four because of rain.
- Kusal Mendis (SL) and Jomel Warrican (WI) made their Test debuts.
- Simon Fry (Aus) stood in his first Test match as an umpire.

== ODI series ==
=== 1st ODI ===
1 November
14:30 (D/N)
Scorecard

West Indies; 159/8 (26 overs)	v	Sri Lanka; 164/9 (24.5 overs)
Andre Russell 41 (24); Suranga Lakmal 3/15 (5 overs)		Tillakaratne Dilshan 59 (32); Sunil Narine 3/21 (6 overs)

Sri Lanka won by 1 wicket (DLS method)
R. Premadasa Stadium, Colombo
Umpires: Michael Gough (Eng) and Ruchira Palliyaguruge (SL)
Player of the match: Tillakaratne Dilshan (SL)

- Sri Lanka won the toss and elected to field.
- The start of the match was delayed by rain.
- Rain stopped play in the 15th over of the West Indies innings, with the score at 40/3. Play resumed after a three-and-a-half hour delay, with the game reduced to 26 overs per side.
- Shehan Jayasuriya and Danushka Gunathilaka (SL) made their ODI debuts.
- West Indies captain Jason Holder was given a one-match ban for bowling a slow over-rate.

=== 2nd ODI ===
4 November
14:30 (D/N)
Scorecard

West Indies; 214 (37.4 overs)	v	Sri Lanka; 225/2 (36.3 overs)
Johnson Charles 83 (70); Milinda Siriwardana 2/27 (7 overs)		Kusal Perera 99 (92); Sunil Narine 1/27 (8 overs)

Sri Lanka won by 8 wickets (DLS method)
R. Premadasa Stadium, Colombo
Umpires: Ranmore Martinesz (SL) and Rod Tucker (Aus)
Player of the match: Kusal Perera (SL)

- West Indies won the toss and elected to bat.
- Rain stopped play in the 27th over of the West Indies innings. Play resumed after a three-hour delay, with the game reduced to 38 overs per side.
- Jermaine Blackwood (WI) made his ODI debut.
- Marlon Samuels captained the West Indies in place of Jason Holder because of the latter serving a one-match ban for a slow-over rate.

=== 3rd ODI ===
7 November
14:30 (D/N)
Scorecard

West Indies; 206/9 (36 overs)	v	Sri Lanka; 180/5 (32.3 overs)
Marlon Samuels 110* (95); Dushmantha Chameera 2/39 (7 overs)		Kusal Perera 50 (47); Jason Holder 2/44 (7 overs)

Sri Lanka won by 19 runs (DLS method)
Pallekele International Cricket Stadium, Kandy
Umpires: Michael Gough (Eng) and Raveendra Wimalasiri (SL)
Player of the match: Marlon Samuels (WI)

- Sri Lanka won the toss and elected to field.
- Rain stopped play in the 4th over of the West Indies innings. Play resumed one hour later, but was halted again because of rain in the 24th over. After a two-hour delay, play started again, with the match reduced to 36 overs per-side. Rain stopped play in the 33rd over of Sri Lanka's innings, with the match declared over by the umpires.

== T20I series ==
=== 1st T20I ===
9 November
19:00 (D/N)
Scorecard

Sri Lanka; 215/3 (20 overs)	v	West Indies; 185 (19.5 overs)
Tillakaratne Dilshan 56 (37); Kieron Pollard 2/42 (4 overs)		Andre Fletcher 57 (25); Sachithra Senanayake 4/46 (4 overs)

Sri Lanka won by 30 runs
Pallekele International Cricket Stadium, Kandy
Umpires: Ranmore Martinesz (SL) and Ruchira Palliyaguruge (SL)
Player of the match: Sachithra Senanayake (SL)

- West Indies won the toss and elected to field.
- The start of the match was delayed by rain.
- Dushmantha Chameera (SL) made his T20I debut.
- Tillakaratne Dilshan became the highest run-scorer for Sri Lanka in T20Is and third overall to pass 1,500 T20I runs.

=== 2nd T20I ===
11 November
19:00 (D/N)
Scorecard

West Indies; 162/6 (20 overs)	v	Sri Lanka; 139 (20 overs)
Denesh Ramdin 34 (22); Lasith Malinga 2/16 (4 overs)		Tillakaratne Dilshan 52 (38); Dwayne Bravo 4/28 (4 overs)

West Indies won by 23 runs
R. Premadasa Stadium, Colombo
Umpires: Ranmore Martinesz (SL) and Raveendra Wimalasiri (SL)
Player of the match: Dwayne Bravo (WI)

- West Indies won the toss and elected to bat.
- The start of the match was delayed by rain.
