= Indian cricket team in the West Indies and the United States in 2019 =

International cricket tour

India against the West Indies in 2019
	West Indies	India
- Dates: 3 August – 3 September 2019
Captains	Jason Holder (Tests & ODIs); Carlos Brathwaite (T20Is)	Virat Kohli

Test series
- Result: India won the 2-match series 2–0
Most runs	Jason Holder (104)	Hanuma Vihari (289)
Most wickets	Kemar Roach (9)	Jasprit Bumrah (13)

One Day International series
- Results: India won the 3-match series 2–0
Most runs	Evin Lewis (148)	Virat Kohli (234)
Most wickets	Carlos Brathwaite (3)	Bhuvneshwar Kumar (4); Mohammed Shami (4); Khaleel Ahmed (4)
- Player of the series: Virat Kohli (Ind)

Twenty20 International series
- Results: India won the 3-match series 3–0
Most runs	Kieron Pollard (115)	Virat Kohli (106)
Most wickets	Sheldon Cottrell (4); Oshane Thomas (4)	Navdeep Saini (5)
- Player of the series: Krunal Pandya (Ind)

The India cricket team toured the West Indies and the United States during August and September 2019 to play two Tests, three One Day Internationals (ODIs) and three Twenty20 International (T20I) matches. The tour started with two of the T20I matches played at the Central Broward Regional Park in Lauderhill, Florida. The Test series formed part of the inaugural 2019–2021 ICC World Test Championship. The fixtures were confirmed in June 2019.

In February 2019, Chris Gayle announced his retirement from ODI cricket, and he last played in a Test match in September 2014, against Bangladesh. However, in June 2019, during the Cricket World Cup, Gayle expressed his desire to play in the ODI matches for the West Indies, and possibly a Test match as well. In July 2019, Cricket West Indies named the ODI squad for the series, with Gayle included in the team. India's MS Dhoni elected to miss the tour to serve with his army regiment, and Hardik Pandya was rested for the series.

India won the T20I series 3–0. In the second ODI, Chris Gayle became the first West Indian cricketer to play in 300 ODI matches. It was his 297th ODI for the West Indies, with Gayle also playing three ODIs for the ICC World XI team. In the same match, Gayle also became the leading run-scorer for a West Indies batsman in ODI cricket. He went past Brian Lara's record of 10,348 runs. India won the ODI series 2–0, after the first match finished as a no result.

India won the Test series 2–0. The second match was Virat Kohli's 28th win as captain of India, becoming the most successful captain of India in Test cricket.

== Squads ==
Tests		ODIs		T20Is	
West Indies	India	West Indies	India	West Indies	India
Jason Holder (c); Jermaine Blackwood; Kraigg Brathwaite; Darren Bravo; Shamarh Brooks; John Campbell; Roston Chase; Rahkeem Cornwall; Miguel Cummins; Shane Dowrich (wk); Shannon Gabriel; Jahmar Hamilton (wk); Shimron Hetmyer; Shai Hope (wk); Keemo Paul; Kemar Roach	Virat Kohli (c); Ajinkya Rahane (vc); Mayank Agarwal; Ravichandran Ashwin; Jasprit Bumrah; Ravindra Jadeja; Rishabh Pant (wk); Cheteshwar Pujara; KL Rahul; Wriddhiman Saha (wk); Mohammed Shami; Ishant Sharma; Rohit Sharma; Hanuma Vihari; Kuldeep Yadav; Umesh Yadav	Jason Holder (c); Fabian Allen; Carlos Brathwaite; John Campbell; Roston Chase; Sheldon Cottrell; Chris Gayle; Shimron Hetmyer; Shai Hope (wk); Evin Lewis; Keemo Paul; Nicholas Pooran; Kemar Roach; Oshane Thomas	Virat Kohli (c); Rohit Sharma (vc); Khaleel Ahmed; Yuzvendra Chahal; Shikhar Dhawan; Shreyas Iyer; Ravindra Jadeja; Kedar Jadhav; Bhuvneshwar Kumar; Manish Pandey; Rishabh Pant (wk); KL Rahul; Navdeep Saini; Mohammed Shami; Kuldeep Yadav	Carlos Brathwaite (c); Fabian Allen; Anthony Bramble (wk); John Campbell; Sheldon Cottrell; Shimron Hetmyer; Evin Lewis; Jason Mohammed; Sunil Narine; Keemo Paul; Khary Pierre; Kieron Pollard; Nicholas Pooran (wk); Rovman Powell; ~~Andre Russell~~; Oshane Thomas	Virat Kohli (c); Rohit Sharma (vc); Khaleel Ahmed; Deepak Chahar; Rahul Chahar; Shikhar Dhawan; Shreyas Iyer; Ravindra Jadeja; Bhuvneshwar Kumar; Manish Pandey; Krunal Pandya; Rishabh Pant (wk); KL Rahul; Navdeep Saini; Washington Sundar

Ahead of the tour, Andre Russell ruled himself out of the West Indies' T20I squad and was replaced by Jason Mohammed. Fabian Allen was added to the West Indies' squad for the third T20I match, replacing Khary Pierre. Keemo Paul was ruled out of the first Test for the West Indies, with Miguel Cummins named as his replacement. For the second Test, Keemo Paul recovered from his injury, returning to the West Indies' squad, replacing Cummins. Jahmar Hamilton was added to the West Indies' squad for the second Test, replacing Shane Dowrich, who had an ankle injury.

In the second innings of the second Test, Jermaine Blackwood replaced Darren Bravo as a concussion substitute in the West Indies' squad.

== Tour match ==
=== Three-day match: West Indies A vs India ===
17–19 August 2019
scorecard

India	v	(Cricket West Indies) West Indies A
297/5d (88.5 overs); Cheteshwar Pujara 100* (187); Jonathan Carter 3/39 (13.5 overs)		181 (56.1 overs); Kavem Hodge 51 (100); Umesh Yadav 3/19 (10 overs)
188/5d (78 overs); Hanuma Vihari 64 (125); Akim Frazer 2/43 (17 overs)		47/3 (21 overs); Jeremy Solozano 16 (50); Ravindra Jadeja 1/3 (3 overs)

Match drawn
Coolidge Cricket Ground, Antigua
Umpires: Gregory Brathwaite (WI) and Leslie Reifer (WI)

- India won the toss and elected to bat.

== T20I series ==
=== 1st T20I ===
3 August 2019
10:30
Scorecard

West Indies; 95/9 (20 overs)	v	India; 98/6 (17.2 overs)
Kieron Pollard 49 (49); Navdeep Saini 3/17 (4 overs)		Rohit Sharma 24 (25); Sunil Narine 2/14 (4 overs)

India won by 4 wickets
Central Broward Regional Park, Lauderhill, Florida
Umpires: Gregory Brathwaite (WI) and Nigel Duguid (WI)
Player of the match: Navdeep Saini (Ind)

- India won the toss and elected to field.
- Navdeep Saini (Ind) made his T20I debut.

=== 2nd T20I ===
4 August 2019
10:30
Scorecard

India; 167/5 (20 overs)	v	West Indies; 98/4 (15.3 overs)
Rohit Sharma 67 (51); Sheldon Cottrell 2/25 (4 overs)		Rovman Powell 54 (34); Krunal Pandya 2/23 (3.3 overs)

India won by 22 runs (DLS method)
Central Broward Regional Park, Lauderhill, Florida
Umpires: Gregory Brathwaite (WI) and Nigel Duguid (WI)
Player of the match: Krunal Pandya (Ind)

- India won the toss and elected to bat.
- West Indies were set a revised target of 121 runs from 15.3 overs due to lightning.

=== 3rd T20I ===
6 August 2019
10:30
Scorecard

West Indies; 146/6 (20 overs)	v	India; 150/3 (19.1 overs)
Kieron Pollard 58 (45); Deepak Chahar 3/4 (3 overs)		Rishabh Pant 65* (42); Oshane Thomas 2/29 (4 overs)

India won by 7 wickets
Providence Stadium, Guyana
Umpires: Nigel Duguid (WI) and Leslie Reifer (WI)
Player of the match: Deepak Chahar (Ind)

- India won the toss and elected to field.
- Rahul Chahar (Ind) made his T20I debut.

== ODI series ==
=== 1st ODI ===
8 August 2019
09:30
Scorecard

West Indies; 54/1 (13 overs)	v	India
Evin Lewis 40* (36); Kuldeep Yadav 1/3 (2 overs)

No result
Providence Stadium, Guyana
Umpires: Nigel Duguid (WI) and Adrian Holdstock (SA)

- India won the toss and elected to field.
- Rain during the West Indies' innings prevented any further play.

=== 2nd ODI ===
11 August 2019
09:30
Scorecard

India; 279/7 (50 overs)	v	West Indies; 210 (42 overs)
Virat Kohli 120 (125); Carlos Brathwaite 3/53 (10 overs)		Evin Lewis 65 (80); Bhuvneshwar Kumar 4/31 (8 overs)

India won by 59 runs (DLS method)
Queen's Park Oval, Port of Spain
Umpires: Gregory Brathwaite (WI) and Nigel Llong (Eng)
Player of the match: Virat Kohli (Ind)

- India won the toss and elected to bat.
- The West Indies were set a revised target of 270 runs from 46 overs due to rain.
- Chris Gayle (WI) played in his 300th ODI, which includes three matches for the ICC World XI team.
- Chris Gayle also became the leading run-scorer for the West Indies in ODIs.

=== 3rd ODI ===
14 August 2019
09:30
Scorecard

West Indies; 240/7 (35 overs)	v	India; 256/4 (32.3 overs)
Chris Gayle 72 (41); Khaleel Ahmed 3/68 (7 overs)		Virat Kohli 114* (99); Fabian Allen 2/40 (6 overs)

India won by 6 wickets (DLS method)
Queen's Park Oval, Port of Spain
Umpires: Adrian Holdstock (SA) and Leslie Reifer (WI)
Player of the match: Virat Kohli (Ind)

- West Indies won the toss and elected to bat.
- India were set a revised target of 255 runs from 35 overs due to rain.

== Test series ==
=== 1st Test ===
22–26 August 2019 (Note: While five days of play were scheduled for each Test, both Tests reached a result in four days.)
Scorecard

India	v	West Indies
297 (96.4 overs); Ajinkya Rahane 81 (163); Kemar Roach 4/66 (25 overs)		222 (74.2 overs); Roston Chase 48 (74); Ishant Sharma 5/43 (17 overs)
343/7d (112.3 overs); Ajinkya Rahane 102 (242); Roston Chase 4/132 (38 overs)		100 (26.5 overs); Kemar Roach 38 (31); Jasprit Bumrah 5/7 (8 overs)

India won by 318 runs
Sir Vivian Richards Stadium, Antigua
Umpires: Richard Kettleborough (Eng) and Rod Tucker (Aus)
Player of the match: Ajinkya Rahane (Ind)

- West Indies won the toss and elected to field.
- 21.1 overs of play were lost on day 1 due to rain.
- Shamarh Brooks (WI) made his Test debut.
- Jasprit Bumrah took the cheapest five-wicket haul by a bowler for India in Tests, with five wickets for seven runs.
- This was Virat Kohli's twelfth win away from home, the most for any captain of India in Tests.
- This was India's biggest win, in terms of runs, away from home in Tests.
- The West Indies' second innings total of 100 was their lowest against India in Tests.
- World Test Championship points: India 60, West Indies 0.

=== 2nd Test ===
30 August–3 September 2019
Scorecard

India	v	West Indies
416 (140.1 overs); Hanuma Vihari 111 (225); Jason Holder 5/77 (32.1 overs)		117 (47.1 overs); Shimron Hetmyer 34 (57); Jasprit Bumrah 6/27 (12.1 overs)
168/4d (54.4 overs); Ajinkya Rahane 64* (109); Kemar Roach 3/28 (10 overs)		210 (59.5 overs); Shamarh Brooks 50 (119); Ravindra Jadeja 3/58 (19.5 overs)

India won by 257 runs
Sabina Park, Kingston
Umpires: Richard Kettleborough (Eng) and Paul Reiffel (Aus)
Player of the match: Hanuma Vihari (Ind)

- West Indies won the toss and elected to field.
- Rahkeem Cornwall and Jahmar Hamilton (WI) both made their Test debuts.
- Hanuma Vihari (Ind) scored his first century in Tests.
- Jason Holder (WI) took his 100th wicket in Tests.
- Jasprit Bumrah (Ind) became the third bowler for India to take a hat-trick in Tests.
- In the second innings of match, Jermaine Blackwood replaced Darren Bravo as a concussion substitute in the West Indies' squad.
- West Indies' second innings was the first instance of 12 players batting in a Test innings.
- World Test Championship points: India 60, West Indies 0.
