= Sri Lankan cricket team in West Indies in 2026 =

International cricket tour

	West Indies	Sri Lanka
- Dates: 3 June – 7 July 2026
Captains	Roston Chase (Tests); Shai Hope (ODIs & T20Is)	Dhananjaya de Silva (Tests); Kusal Mendis (ODIs & T20Is)

Test series
- Result: West Indies won the 2-match series 1–0
Most runs	Amir Jangoo (242)	Lahiru Udara (188)
Most wickets	Jayden Seales (7); Shamar Joseph (7)	Asitha Fernando (7)
- Player of the series: Justin Greaves (WI)

One Day International series
- Results: Sri Lanka won the 3-match series 1–0
Most runs	Shai Hope (56)	Pathum Nissanka (79)
Most wickets	Matthew Forde (2)	Dushmantha Chameera (4)

Twenty20 International series
- Results: West Indies won the 3-match series 2–1
Most runs	Rovman Powell (86)	Dasun Shanaka (96)
Most wickets	Shamar Joseph (11)	Wanindu Hasaranga (7)
- Player of the series: Shamar Joseph (WI)

The Sri Lankan cricket team toured West Indies in June and July 2026 to play the West Indies cricket team. The tour consisted of three One Day International matches, three T20I matches and two Test matches. The Test series formed part of the 2025–2027 ICC World Test Championship.

The ODI series played at Sabina Park in Kingston was heavily affected by rain. Sri Lanka won the opening match by 41 runs, while the second and third ODIs were abandoned without a ball being bowled. Consequently, Sri Lanka secured their first ODI series victory in the Caribbean in 23 years, having last won in 2003. West Indies won the test series and thus got the maiden Sobers–Tissera Trophy. They secured their first Test series win against Sri Lanka after 23 years.

== Squads ==
West Indies			Sri Lanka		
Test	ODI	T20I	Test	ODI	T20I
Roston Chase (c); Jomel Warrican (vc); John Campbell; Tagenarine Chanderpaul; Joshua Da Silva (wk); Justin Greaves; Kavem Hodge; Shai Hope (wk); Amir Jangoo; Alzarri Joseph; Shamar Joseph; Brandon King; Anderson Phillip; Kemar Roach; Jayden Seales	Shai Hope (c, wk); Ackeem Auguste; John Campbell; Keacy Carty; Roston Chase; Matthew Forde; Justin Greaves; Shimron Hetmyer; Amir Jangoo; Alzarri Joseph; Shamar Joseph; Gudakesh Motie; Sherfane Rutherford; Jayden Seales; Shamar Springer	Shai Hope (c, wk); Jewel Andrew; Ackeem Auguste; Roston Chase; Matthew Forde; Shimron Hetmyer; Jason Holder; Akeal Hosein; Shamar Joseph; Brandon King; Gudakesh Motie; Rovman Powell; Sherfane Rutherford; Romario Shepherd; Shamar Springer	Dhananjaya de Silva (c); Kamindu Mendis (vc); Dinesh Chandimal (wk); Sonal Dinusha; Asitha Fernando; Vishwa Fernando; Prabath Jayasuriya; Lahiru Kumara; Nishan Madushka (wk); Kusal Mendis (wk); Ramesh Mendis; Pathum Nissanka; Kasun Rajitha; Milan Rathnayake; Pasindu Sooriyabandara; Lahiru Udara (wk); Isitha Wijesundara	Kusal Mendis (c, wk); Kamindu Mendis (vc); Charith Asalanka; Dushmantha Chameera; Asitha Fernando; Wanindu Hasaranga; Janith Liyanage; Pramod Madushan; Dilshan Madushanka; Eshan Malinga; Kamil Mishara; Pathum Nissanka; Pavan Rathnayake; Milan Rathnayake; Maheesh Theekshana; Dunith Wellalage	Kusal Mendis (c, wk); Kamindu Mendis (vc); Dushmantha Chameera; Lasith Croospulle; Binura Fernando; Wanindu Hasaranga; Dilshan Madushanka; Eshan Malinga; Kamil Mishara; Pathum Nissanka; Pavan Rathnayake; Milan Rathnayake; Dasun Shanaka; Maheesh Theekshana; Nuwan Thushara; Dunith Wellalage

== Tour match ==
=== Four-day warm-up ===
18–21 June 2026
Scorecard

West Indies Select XI	v	Sri Lanka
205 (61.4 overs); Kirk McKenzie 58 (107); Lahiru Kumara 4/39 (11 overs)		281 (70.4 overs); Dinesh Chandimal 74 (144); Nial Smith 4/58 (14.4 overs)
199 (45.2 overs); Joshua Bishop 68 (42); Asitha Fernando 3/27 (9 overs)		108 (29.5 overs); Nishan Madushka 30 (42); Nial Smith 5/30 (10 overs)

West Indies Select XI won by 15 runs
Coolidge Cricket Ground, Antigua
Umpires: Deighton Butler (WI) and Carl Tuckett (WI)

- Sri Lanka won the toss and elected to field.

== ODI series ==
=== 1st ODI ===
3 June 2026
09:30
Scorecard

Sri Lanka; 303/7 (50 overs)	v	West Indies; 262 (49.2 overs)
Pathum Nissanka 79 (103); Matthew Forde 2/44 (9 overs)		Shai Hope 56 (66); Dushmantha Chameera 4/67 (10 overs)

Sri Lanka won by 41 runs
Sabina Park, Kingston
Umpires: Wayne Knights (NZ) and Leslie Reifer (WI)
Player of the match: Kusal Mendis (SL)

- West Indies won the toss and elected to field.
- This was Sri Lanka's first ODI win at West Indies since 2013.

=== 2nd ODI ===
6 June 2026
14:30 (D/N)
Scorecard

West Indies	v	Sri Lanka

No result
Sabina Park, Kingston
Umpires: Allahuddien Paleker (SA) and Christopher Taylor (WI)

- West Indies won the toss and elected to field.
- No play was possible due to rain.

=== 3rd ODI ===
8 June 2026
14:30 (D/N)
Scorecard

West Indies	v	Sri Lanka

Match abandoned
Sabina Park, Kingston
Umpires: Wayne Knights (NZ) and Leslie Reifer (WI)

- No toss.
- No play was possible due to rain.

== T20I series ==
=== 1st T20I ===
11 June 2026
19:30 (N)
Scorecard

Sri Lanka; 147/9 (20 overs)	v	West Indies; 149/3 (19.2 overs)
Kamindu Mendis 51 (39); Jason Holder 3/18 (4 overs)		Shai Hope 65* (54); Wanindu Hasaranga 2/32 (4 overs)

West Indies won by 7 wickets
Sabina Park, Kingston
Umpires: Zahid Bassarath (WI) and Deighton Butler (WI)
Player of the match: Jason Holder (WI)

- Sri Lanka won the toss and elected to bat.
- Kusal Mendis (SL) became the second Sri Lankan to hit 100 sixes in T20Is.
- Brandon King (WI) scored his 2,000th run in T20Is.

=== 2nd T20I ===
13 June 2026
19:30 (N)
Scorecard

Sri Lanka; 194/6 (20 overs)	v	West Indies; 157 (18.1 overs)
Kamil Mishara 61* (40); Shamar Joseph 4/32 (4 overs)		Rovman Powell 43 (26); Dushmantha Chameera 3/9 (3.1 overs)

Sri Lanka won by 37 runs
Sabina Park, Kingston
Umpires: Leslie Reifer (WI) and Christopher Taylor (WI)
Player of the match: Dasun Shanaka (SL)

- West Indies won the toss and elected to field.
- Dasun Shanaka equaled his record of fastest half-century (19 balls) in T20Is for Sri Lanka and became the first player to score 1,000 runs for number 6 position in T20Is.

=== 3rd T20I ===
14 June 2026
19:30 (N)
Scorecard

Sri Lanka; 169 (20 overs)	v	West Indies; 170/5 (19.4 overs)
Dunith Wellalage 43 (28); Shamar Joseph 5/33 (4 overs)		Sherfane Rutherford 54* (40); Wanindu Hasaranga 2/17 (4 overs)

West Indies won by 5 wickets
Sabina Park, Kingston
Umpires: Deighton Butler (WI) and Leslie Reifer (WI)
Player of the match: Shamar Joseph (WI)

- West Indies won the toss and elected to field.
- Dasun Shanaka (SL) scored his 2,000th run in T20Is.
- Shamar Joseph (WI) took his maiden five-wicket haul in T20Is.

== Test series ==
=== 1st Test ===
25–28 June 2026
Scorecard

Sri Lanka	v	West Indies
308 (71.5 overs); Dhananjaya de Silva 120 (168); Justin Greaves 3/39 (11 overs)		626/9d (160.5 overs); Amir Jangoo 233 (373); Milan Rathnayake 5/124 (35.5 overs)
101 (31.2 overs); Dinesh Chandimal 43 (60); Kemar Roach 4/51 (11 overs)

West Indies won by an innings and 217 runs
Sir Vivian Richards Stadium, North Sound
Umpires: Ahsan Raza (Pak) and Sharfuddoula (Ban)
Player of the match: Amir Jangoo (WI)

- West Indies won the toss and elected to field.
- Amir Jangoo (WI) scored his maiden century and double century in Tests.
- Roston Chase and Amir Jangoo (WI) recorded the highest ever partnership for the 6th wicket (401).
- Kemar Roach (WI) took his 300th wicket in Tests.
- World Test Championship points: West Indies 12, Sri Lanka 0.

=== 2nd Test ===
3–7 July 2026
Scorecard

Sri Lanka	v	West Indies
549/9d (139.3 overs); Lahiru Udara 188 (248); Shamar Joseph 2/98 (23 overs)		499 (165.5 overs); Justin Greaves 180 (325); Asitha Fernando 5/130 (40 overs)
251/9d (49 overs); Dinesh Chandimal 71 (107); Alzarri Joseph 2/44 (9 overs)		109/0 (40 overs); John Campbell 51* (113)

Match drawn
Sir Vivian Richards Stadium, North Sound
Umpires: Paul Reiffel (Aus) and Ahsan Raza (Pak)
Player of the match: Justin Greaves (WI)

- Sri Lanka won the toss and elected to bat.
- Isitha Wijesundara (SL) made his Test debut.
- Lahiru Udara (SL) scored his maiden century in Tests.
- Jayden Seales (WI) took his 100th Test wicket.
- World Test Championship points: Sri Lanka 4, West Indies 2. (Note: West Indies were deducted 2 points for maintaining a slow over-rate.)
