= Sri Lankan cricket team in the West Indies in 2020–21 =

International cricket tour

	West Indies	Sri Lanka
- Dates: 3 March – 2 April 2021
Captains	Kraigg Brathwaite (Tests); Kieron Pollard (ODIs & T20Is)	Dimuth Karunaratne (Tests & ODIs); Angelo Mathews (T20Is)

Test series
- Result: 2-match series drawn 0–0
Most runs	Kraigg Brathwaite (237)	Lahiru Thirimanne (240)
Most wickets	Kemar Roach (9)	Suranga Lakmal (11)
- Player of the series: Suranga Lakmal (SL)

One Day International series
- Results: West Indies won the 3-match series 3–0
Most runs	Shai Hope (258)	Danushka Gunathilaka (187)
Most wickets	Jason Mohammed (6)	Thisara Perera (3)
- Player of the series: Shai Hope (WI)

Twenty20 International series
- Results: West Indies won the 3-match series 2–1
Most runs	Lendl Simmons (73)	Pathum Nissanka (81)
Most wickets	Obed McCoy (4)	Wanindu Hasaranga (8)

The Sri Lanka cricket team toured the West Indies during March and April 2021 to play two Test matches, three One Day International (ODI) and three Twenty20 International (T20I) matches. The Tests formed part of the inaugural 2019–2021 ICC World Test Championship, and the ODI series formed part of the inaugural 2020–2023 ICC Cricket World Cup Super League.

In February 2021, Sri Lanka's coach Mickey Arthur and batsman Lahiru Thirimanne returned positive COVID-19 tests. This resulted in several media reports stating that the tour had been postponed. However, the following day, Cricket West Indies (CWI) announced their upcoming broadcast deal to show live cricket in the Caribbean, starting with hosting Sri Lanka across all three formats. On 16 February 2021, both cricket boards confirmed the dates for the fixtures.

Sri Lanka Cricket also formally appointed Dasun Shanaka as their T20I captain, replacing Lasith Malinga. Shanaka had previously captained the T20I side in October 2019, against Pakistan. However, Shanaka did not depart for the tour with the rest of the team due to visa issues, with Angelo Mathews named as Sri Lanka's stand-in captain for the T20I matches. Sri Lanka Cricket issued a statement saying that Shanka is expected to join up with the team once his visa issue has been resolved.

On 26 February 2021, the West Indies named their squads for the limited overs matches. Chris Gayle and Fidel Edwards were recalled to the T20I team, after last playing for the national side two and nine years ago respectively. On 11 March 2021, CWI formally appointed Kraigg Brathwaite as their Test captain, replacing Jason Holder. Brathwaite had previously captained the West Indies team in seven Tests.

On 2 March 2021, CWI named the match officials for the tour. Joel Wilson, who has been the on-field umpire for 19 Tests prior to the tour, stood in his first Test match at home. Gregory Brathwaite also made his debut as an on-field umpire in Test cricket.

The West Indies won the first T20I match by four wickets, with Sri Lanka winning the second match by 43 runs to level the series. The West Indies won the final match by three wickets to win the series 2–1. The West Indies won the first two ODI matches to win the series with a game to go. They went on to win the final match by five wickets, to take the series 3–0. Both Test matches finished as draws, therefore the series was also drawn 0–0.

== Squads ==
Tests		ODIs		T20Is	
West Indies	Sri Lanka	West Indies	Sri Lanka	West Indies	Sri Lanka
Kraigg Brathwaite (c); Jermaine Blackwood (vc); Nkrumah Bonner; Darren Bravo; John Campbell; Rahkeem Cornwall; Joshua Da Silva (wk); Shannon Gabriel; Jason Holder; Alzarri Joseph; Kyle Mayers; Kemar Roach; Jomel Warrican	Dimuth Karunaratne (c); Dushmantha Chameera; Dinesh Chandimal; Dhananjaya de Silva; Niroshan Dickwella (wk); Lasith Embuldeniya; Asitha Fernando; Oshada Fernando; Vishwa Fernando; Wanindu Hasaranga; Suranga Lakmal; ~~Angelo Mathews~~; Ramesh Mendis; Pathum Nissanka; Dasun Shanaka; Roshen Silva; Lahiru Thirimanne	Kieron Pollard (c); Shai Hope (vc, wk); Fabian Allen; Darren Bravo; Jason Holder; Akeal Hosein; Alzarri Joseph; Evin Lewis; Kyle Mayers; Jason Mohammed; Anderson Phillip; Nicholas Pooran (wk); Romario Shepherd; Kevin Sinclair	Dimuth Karunaratne (c); Ashen Bandara; Dushmantha Chameera; Dinesh Chandimal (wk); Akila Dananjaya; Niroshan Dickwella (wk); Oshada Fernando; Asitha Fernando; Wanindu Hasaranga; Danushka Gunathilaka; ~~Lahiru Kumara~~; Suranga Lakmal; Dilshan Madushanka; Angelo Mathews; Kamindu Mendis; Ramesh Mendis; Pathum Nissanka; Thisara Perera; Nuwan Pradeep; Lakshan Sandakan; Dasun Shanaka	Kieron Pollard (c); Nicholas Pooran (vc, wk); Fabian Allen; Dwayne Bravo; Fidel Edwards; Andre Fletcher (wk); Chris Gayle; Jason Holder; Akeal Hosein; Evin Lewis; Obed McCoy; Rovman Powell; Lendl Simmons; Kevin Sinclair	Angelo Mathews (c); ~~Dasun Shanaka (c)~~; Ashen Bandara; Dushmantha Chameera; Dinesh Chandimal (wk); Akila Dananjaya; Niroshan Dickwella (wk); Oshada Fernando; Asitha Fernando; Wanindu Hasaranga; Danushka Gunathilaka; Dimuth Karunaratne; ~~Lahiru Kumara~~; Suranga Lakmal; Dilshan Madushanka; Kamindu Mendis; Ramesh Mendis; Pathum Nissanka; Thisara Perera; Nuwan Pradeep; Lakshan Sandakan

Ahead of the tour, Lahiru Kumara was ruled out of Sri Lanka's white-ball squad due to a positive test for COVID-19, with Suranga Lakmal named as his replacement. Sri Lanka's Dasun Shanaka missed the T20I matches, after he was unable to travel due to visa issues. On 5 March 2021, Sri Lanka Cricket issued a statement stating that Shanka would join up with the team for the ODI matches. Prior to the second ODI match, Angelo Mathews left Sri Lanka's squad for the rest of the tour to return home due to a family matter. Ahead of the third ODI, Anderson Phillip was added to the West Indies' squad.

On 12 March 2021, Cricket West Indies named the squad for the first Test match, with Roston Chase, Jahmar Hamilton and Chemar Holder named as reserves and Jayden Seales as a developmental player.

== Tour matches ==
8–11 March 2021
Scorecard

Roston Chase XI	v	Brathwaite XI
326 (97.2 overs); John Campbell 129 (253); Preston McSween 4/64 (24 overs)		346 (96.5 overs); Kraigg Brathwaite 95 (156); Jomel Warrican 3/72 (27 overs)
113 (42.1 overs); John Campbell 55 (118); Veerasammy Permaul 4/21 (12.1 overs)		95/6 (20.3 overs); Kieran Powell 29 (22); Raymon Reifer 2/15 (3 overs)

Brathwaite XI won by 4 wickets
Coolidge Cricket Ground, Antigua
Umpires: Patrick Gustard (WI) and Carl Tuckett (WI)

- Brathwaite XI won the toss and elected to field.

17–18 March 2021
Scorecard

Sri Lanka	v	West Indies President's XI
172 (49.3 overs); Oshada Fernando 47 (90); Roston Chase 4/12 (7 overs)		294 (81.2 overs); Shai Hope 68 (89); Dhananjaya de Silva 3/26 (10 overs)
56/0 (13 overs); Dimuth Karunaratne 27* (41)

Match drawn
Coolidge Cricket Ground, Antigua
Umpires: Gregory Brathwaite (WI) and Leslie Reifer (WI)

- Sri Lanka won the toss and elected to bat.

== T20I series ==
=== 1st T20I ===
3 March 2021
18:00 (N)
Scorecard

Sri Lanka; 131/9 (20 overs)	v	West Indies; 134/6 (13.1 overs)
Pathum Nissanka 39 (34); Obed McCoy 2/25 (4 overs)		Kieron Pollard 38 (11); Wanindu Hasaranga 3/12 (4 overs)

West Indies won by 4 wickets
Coolidge Cricket Ground, Antigua
Umpires: Gregory Brathwaite (WI) and Nigel Duguid (WI)
Player of the match: Kieron Pollard (WI)

- West Indies won the toss and elected to field.
- Kevin Sinclair (WI), Ashen Bandara and Pathum Nissanka (SL) all made their T20I debuts.
- This was the first T20I match to be played at this ground.
- Akila Dananjaya (SL) took a hat-trick, becoming the third bowler for Sri Lanka to take a hat-trick in T20Is.
- Kieron Pollard (WI) hit six sixes in one over, off the bowling of Akila Dananjaya, becoming the second cricketer to achieve this in T20Is.

=== 2nd T20I ===
5 March 2021
18:00 (N)
Scorecard

Sri Lanka; 160/6 (20 overs)	v	West Indies; 117 (18.4 overs)
Danushka Gunathilaka 56 (42); Dwayne Bravo 2/25 (4 overs)		Obed McCoy 23 (7); Lakshan Sandakan 3/10 (3.4 overs)

Sri Lanka won by 43 runs
Coolidge Cricket Ground, Antigua
Umpires: Nigel Duguid (WI) and Leslie Reifer (WI)
Player of the match: Wanindu Hasaranga (SL)

- Sri Lanka won the toss and elected to bat.

=== 3rd T20I ===
7 March 2021
18:00 (N)
Scorecard

Sri Lanka; 131/4 (20 overs)	v	West Indies; 134/7 (19 overs)
Dinesh Chandimal 54* (46); Fabian Allen 1/13 (4 overs)		Lendl Simmons 26 (18); Lakshan Sandakan 3/29 (4 overs)

West Indies won by 3 wickets
Coolidge Cricket Ground, Antigua
Umpires: Patrick Gustard (WI) and Joel Wilson (WI)
Player of the match: Fabian Allen (WI)

- Sri Lanka won the toss and elected to bat.

== ODI series ==
=== 1st ODI ===
10 March 2021
09:30
Scorecard

Sri Lanka; 232 (49 overs)	v	West Indies; 236/2 (47 overs)
Danushka Gunathilaka 55 (61); Jason Mohammed 2/12 (4 overs)		Shai Hope 110 (133); Dushmantha Chameera 2/50 (10 overs)

West Indies won by 8 wickets
Sir Vivian Richards Stadium, Antigua
Umpires: Gregory Brathwaite (WI) and Joel Wilson (WI)
Player of the match: Shai Hope (WI)

- Sri Lanka won the toss and elected to bat.
- Ashen Bandara and Pathum Nissanka (SL) both made their ODI debuts.
- Danushka Gunathilaka became the first cricketer for Sri Lanka to be given out obstructing the field in ODIs.
- Shai Hope (WI) scored his 10th century in ODIs.
- World Cup Super League points: West Indies 10, Sri Lanka 0.

=== 2nd ODI ===
12 March 2021
09:30
Scorecard

Sri Lanka; 273/8 (50 overs)	v	West Indies; 274/5 (49.4 overs)
Danushka Gunathilaka 96 (96); Jason Mohammed 3/47 (10 overs)		Evin Lewis 103 (121); Thisara Perera 2/45 (7 overs)

West Indies won by 5 wickets
Sir Vivian Richards Stadium, Antigua
Umpires: Nigel Duguid (WI) and Joel Wilson (WI)
Player of the match: Evin Lewis (WI)

- West Indies won the toss and elected to field.
- World Cup Super League points: West Indies 10, Sri Lanka 0.

=== 3rd ODI ===
14 March 2021
09:30
Scorecard

Sri Lanka; 274/6 (50 overs)	v	West Indies; 276/5 (48.3 overs)
Wanindu Hasaranga 80* (60); Akeal Hosein 3/33 (10 overs)		Darren Bravo 102 (132); Suranga Lakmal 2/56 (9.3 overs)

West Indies won by 5 wickets
Sir Vivian Richards Stadium, Antigua
Umpires: Leslie Reifer (WI) and Joel Wilson (WI)
Player of the match: Darren Bravo (WI)

- West Indies won the toss and elected to field.
- Anderson Phillip (WI) made his ODI debut.
- World Cup Super League points: West Indies 10, Sri Lanka –2. (Note: Sri Lanka were deducted two World Cup Super League points for bowling a slow over-rate.)

== Test series ==
=== 1st Test ===
21–25 March 2021
Scorecard

Sri Lanka	v	West Indies
169 (69.4 overs); Lahiru Thirimanne 70 (180); Jason Holder 5/27 (17.4 overs)		271 (103 overs); Rahkeem Cornwall 61 (85); Suranga Lakmal 5/47 (25 overs)
476 (149.5 overs); Pathum Nissanka 103 (252); Kemar Roach 3/74 (27 overs)		236/4 (100 overs); Nkrumah Bonner 113* (274); Lasith Embuldeniya 2/62 (28 overs)

Match drawn
Sir Vivian Richards Stadium, Antigua
Umpires: Gregory Brathwaite (WI) and Joel Wilson (WI)
Player of the match: Nkrumah Bonner (WI)

- West Indies won the toss and elected to field.
- Pathum Nissanka (SL) made his Test debut and became the fourth batsman for Sri Lanka to score a century on debut in Tests.
- Gregory Brathwaite (WI) stood in his first Test as an umpire.
- Nkrumah Bonner (WI) scored his first century in Tests.
- World Test Championship points: West Indies 20, Sri Lanka 20.

=== 2nd Test ===
29 March – 2 April 2021
Scorecard

West Indies	v	Sri Lanka
354 (111.1 overs); Kraigg Brathwaite 126 (311); Suranga Lakmal 4/94 (28 overs)		258 (107 overs); Lahiru Thirimanne 55 (106); Kemar Roach 3/58 (18 overs)
280/4d (72.4 overs); Kraigg Brathwaite 85 (196); Suranga Lakmal 2/62 (14 overs)		193/2 (79 overs); Dimuth Karunaratne 75 (176); Kyle Mayers 1/5 (6 overs)

Match drawn
Sir Vivian Richards Stadium, Antigua
Umpires: Gregory Brathwaite (WI) and Joel Wilson (WI)
Player of the match: Kraigg Brathwaite (WI)

- Sri Lanka won the toss and elected to field.
- Only 42.1 overs were possible on day 3 due to rain.
- Kraigg Brathwaite (WI) scored his 4,000th run in Tests.
- World Test Championship points: West Indies 20, Sri Lanka 20.
