= International cricket in 1964–65 =

International cricket season

The 1964–65 international cricket season was from September 1964 to April 1965.

== Season overview ==
International tours
Start date	Home team	Away team	Results [Matches]			
Start date	Home team	Away team	Test	ODI	FC	LA
2 October 1964	India	Australia	1–1 [3]	—	—	—
24 October 1964	Pakistan	Australia	0–0 [1]	—	—	—
4 December 1964	South Africa	England	0–1 [5]	—	—	—
4 December 1964	Australia	Pakistan	0–0 [1]	—	—	—
11 December 1964	India	Ceylon	—	—	2–1 [3]	—
22 January 1965	New Zealand	Pakistan	0–0 [3]	—	—	—
27 February 1965	India	New Zealand	1–0 [4]	—	—	—
3 March 1965	West Indies	Australia	2–1 [5]	—	—	—
27 March 1965	Pakistan	New Zealand	2–0 [3]	—	—	—

== October ==
=== Australia in India ===
Test series
No.	Date	Home captain	Away captain	Venue	Result
Test 566	2–7 October	Mansoor Ali Khan Pataudi	Bob Simpson	Corporation Stadium, Madras	Australia by 139 runs
Test 567	10–15 October	Mansoor Ali Khan Pataudi	Bob Simpson	Brabourne Stadium, Bombay	India by 2 wickets
Test 568	17–22 October	Mansoor Ali Khan Pataudi	Bob Simpson	Eden Gardens, Calcutta	Match drawn

=== Australia in Pakistan ===
One-off Test Match
No.	Date	Home captain	Away captain	Venue	Result
Test 569	24–29 October	Hanif Mohammad	Bob Simpson	National Stadium, Karachi	Match drawn

== December ==
=== Pakistan in Australia ===
One-off Test series
No.	Date	Home captain	Away captain	Venue	Result
Test 570	4–8 December	Bob Simpson	Hanif Mohammad	Melbourne Cricket Ground, Melbourne	Match drawn

=== England in South Africa ===
Test series
No.	Date	Home captain	Away captain	Venue	Result
Test 571	4–8 December	Trevor Goddard	Mike Smith	Kingsmead, Durban	England by an innings and 104 runs
Test 572	23–29 December	Trevor Goddard	Mike Smith	New Wanderers Stadium, Johannesburg	Match drawn
Test 573	1–6 January	Trevor Goddard	Mike Smith	Newlands, Cape Town	Match drawn
Test 575	22–27 January	Trevor Goddard	Mike Smith	New Wanderers Stadium, Johannesburg	Match drawn
Test 578	12–17 February	Trevor Goddard	Mike Smith	Crusaders Ground, Port Elizabeth	Match drawn

=== Ceylon in India ===
First-class series (unofficial Tests)
No.	Date	Home captain	Away captain	Venue	Result
FC Match	11–13 December	Mansoor Ali Khan Pataudi	Michael Tissera	Karnataka State Cricket Association Stadium, Bangalore	India by an innings and 46 runs
FC Match	19–22 December	Mansoor Ali Khan Pataudi	Michael Tissera	Lal Bahadur Shastri Stadium, Hyderabad	India by 7 wickets
FC Match	2–5 January	Mansoor Ali Khan Pataudi	Michael Tissera	Sardar Patel Stadium, Ahmedabad	Ceylon by 4 wickets

== January ==
=== Pakistan in New Zealand ===
Test Series
No.	Date	Home captain	Away captain	Venue	Result
Test 574	22–26 January	John Reid	Hanif Mohammad	Basin Reserve, Wellington	Match drawn
Test 576	29 Jan-2 February	John Reid	Hanif Mohammad	Eden Park, Auckland	Match drawn
Test 577	12–16 February	John Reid	Hanif Mohammad	Lancaster Park, Christchurch	Match drawn

== February ==
=== New Zealand in India ===
Test series
No.	Date	Home captain	Away captain	Venue	Result
Test 579	27 Feb–2 March	Mansoor Ali Khan Pataudi	John Reid	Corporation Stadium, Madras	Match drawn
Test 581	5–8 March	Mansoor Ali Khan Pataudi	John Reid	Eden Gardens, Calcutta	Match drawn
Test 582	12–15 March	Mansoor Ali Khan Pataudi	John Reid	Brabourne Stadium, Bombay	Match drawn
Test 583	19–22 March	Mansoor Ali Khan Pataudi	John Reid	Feroz Shah Kotla Ground, Delhi	India by 7 wickets

== March ==
=== Australia in the West Indies ===
Frank Worrell Trophy Test Series
No.	Date	Home captain	Away captain	Venue	Result
Test 580	3–8 March	Garfield Sobers	Bob Simpson	Sabina Park, Kingston	West Indies by 179 runs
Test 584	26 Mar–1 April	Garfield Sobers	Bob Simpson	Queen's Park Oval, Port of Spain	Match drawn
Test 588	14–20 April	Garfield Sobers	Bob Simpson	Bourda, Georgetown	West Indies by 212 runs
Test 589	5–11 May	Garfield Sobers	Bob Simpson	Kensington Oval, Bridgetown	Match drawn
Test 590	14–17 May	Garfield Sobers	Bob Simpson	Queen's Park Oval, Port of Spain	Australia by 10 wickets

=== New Zealand in Pakistan ===
Test series
No.	Date	Home captain	Away captain	Venue	Result
Test 585	27–30 March	Hanif Mohammad	John Reid	Pindi Club Ground, Rawalpindi	Pakistan by an innings and 64 runs
Test 586	2–7 April	Hanif Mohammad	John Reid	Gaddafi Stadium, Lahore	Match drawn
Test 587	9–14 April	Hanif Mohammad	John Reid	National Stadium, Karachi	Pakistan by 8 wickets
