= Asitha Fernando =

Sri Lankan cricketer (born 1997)

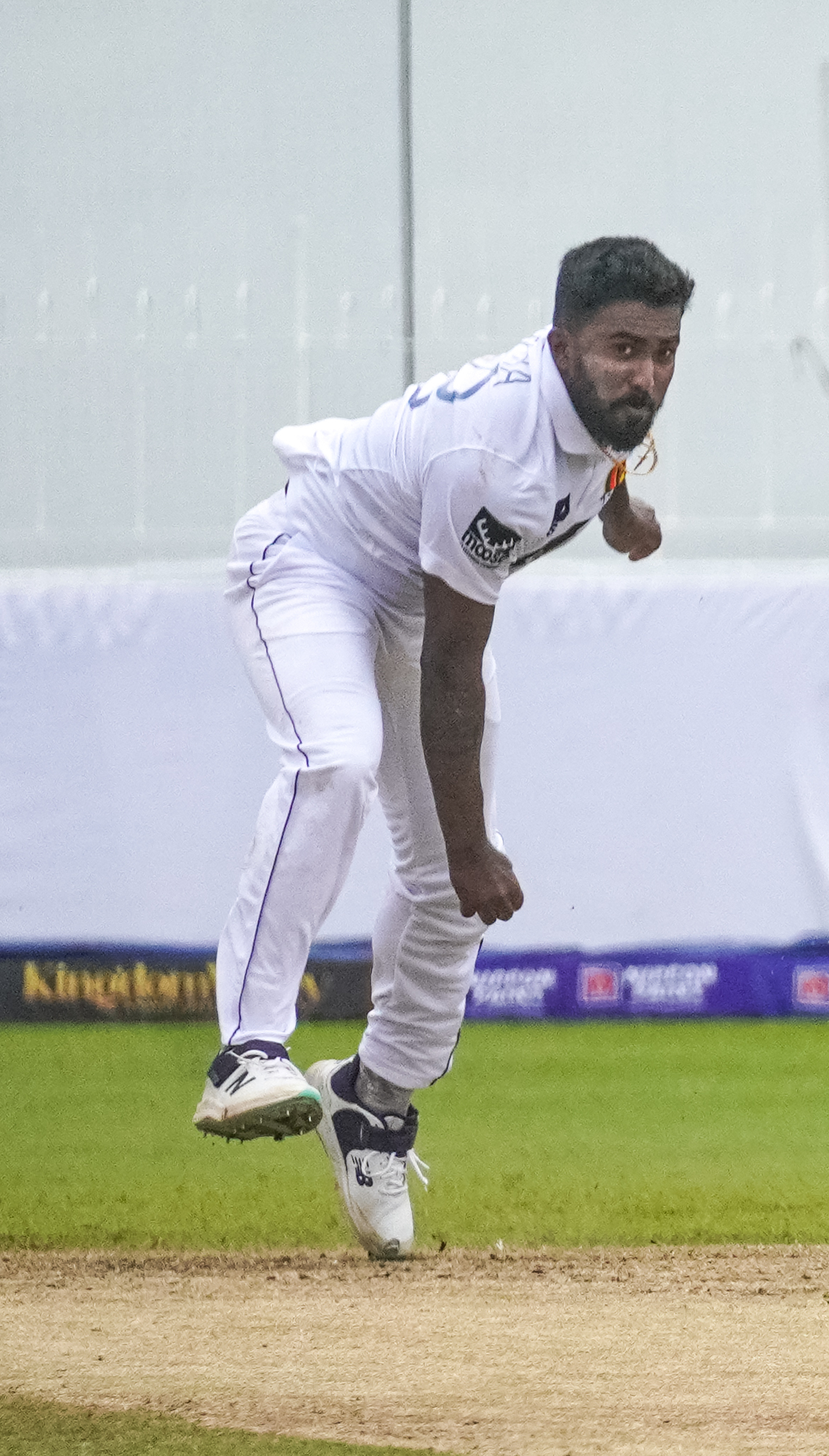
- Fernando in 2023

Personal information
- Full name: Asitha Madusanka Fernando
- Born: 31 July 1997 (age 29); Katuneriya, Sri Lanka
- Height: 5 ft 8 in (173 cm)
- Batting: Right-handed
- Bowling: Right arm medium-fast
- Role: Bowler

International information
- National side: Sri Lanka (2017–present)
- Test debut (cap 153): 3 January 2021 v South Africa
- Last Test: 17 November 2026 v Pakistan
- ODI debut (cap 181): 8 July 2017 v Zimbabwe
- Last ODI: 31 October 2026 v Pakistan
- T20I debut (cap 97): 1 September 2022 v Bangladesh
- Last T20I: 13 October 2024 v West Indies

Domestic team information
- Years: Team
- 2016–2020: Chilaw Marians
- 2018–2019: Nondescripts
- 2020: Galle Gladiators
- 2022–present: Colombo
- 2022–present: Jaffna Kings
- 2023: Nottinghamshire
- 2025: Glamorgan

Career statistics
Competition	Test	ODI	T20I	FC
Matches	30	39	7	107
Runs scored	66	7	11	331
Batting average	3.00	1.75	–	4.66
100s/50s	0/0	0/0	0/0	0/0
Top score	11	3*	10*	30
Balls bowled	4,894	1,262	120	14,110
Wickets	106	55	4	326
Bowling average	26.92	31.45	52.00	24.91
5 wickets in innings	3	0	0	11
10 wickets in match	1	0	0	1
Best bowling	6/51	4/35	1/11	7/139
Catches/stumpings	8/–	7/–	2/–	26/–
Medal record
Representing Sri Lanka
Men's Cricket
South Asian Games
Silver medal – second place	2019 Kathmandu/Pokhara	Team
- Source: Cricinfo, 20 November 2026

Asitha Madusanka Fernando (born 31 July 1997) is a Sri Lankan cricketer who has played for the national team since 2017 across all international formats. As of May 2026, Fernando has the best career strike rate and the second best average for a Sri Lankan Test bowler.

In the Lanka Premier League (LPL), he has played for the Jaffna Kings since the 2022 season, and for the Galle Gladiators in the inaugural 2020 season.

== Under 19 and domestic career ==
Prior to his Test selection, he was part of Sri Lanka's squad for the 2016 Under-19 Cricket World Cup. He was the leading pace bowler in the World Cup for Sri Lanka who finished the tournament as semi-finalists courtesy of bowling performances of Fernando and Lahiru Kumara.

He made his Twenty20 debut for Chilaw Marians Cricket Club in the 2017–18 SLC Twenty20 Tournament on 24 February 2018.

In March 2018, he was named in Dumbulla's squad for the 2017–18 Super Four Provincial Tournament. The following month, he was also named in Dambulla's squad for the 2018 Super Provincial One Day Tournament. He was the leading wicket-taker for Dambulla in the tournament, with six dismissals in three matches.

In August 2018, he was named in Colombo's squad the 2018 SLC T20 League. In March 2019, he was named in Colombo's squad for the 2019 Super Provincial One Day Tournament.

In January 2020, in the 2019–20 SLC Twenty20 Tournament, he took six wickets for eight runs for Chilaw Marians Cricket Club. In October 2020, he was drafted by the Galle Gladiators for the inaugural edition of the Lanka Premier League. In August 2021, he was named in the SLC Reds team for the 2021 SLC Invitational T20 League tournament.

In December 2024, Fernando agreed a contract to play for Glamorgan County Cricket Club in their first seven matches of the 2025 County Championship season.

== International career ==
In July 2016 he was named in Sri Lanka's Test squad for their series against Australia, but he did not play.

Fernando was included in Sri Lanka's One Day International (ODI) squad for the series against Zimbabwe. He made his ODI debut on 8 July 2017 at the Mahinda Rajapaksa International Cricket Stadium in the fourth ODI against Zimbabwe, but did not able to take a wicket. He made his international debut for the Sri Lanka cricket team in July 2017.

In February 2018, he was named in Sri Lanka's Twenty20 International (T20I) squad for their series against Bangladesh, but he did not play. In May 2018, he was named in Sri Lanka's Test squad for their series against the West Indies.

In December 2018, he was named in Sri Lanka team for the 2018 ACC Emerging Teams Asia Cup. In August 2019, he was named in a twenty-two man squad for Sri Lanka's Test series against New Zealand. However, he was not named in the final fifteen-man squad for the first Test. In November 2019, he was named in Sri Lanka's squad for the 2019 ACC Emerging Teams Asia Cup in Bangladesh. Later the same month, he was named in Sri Lanka's squad for the cricket tournament at the 2019 South Asian Games. The Sri Lanka team won the silver medal, after they lost to Bangladesh by seven wickets in the final.

In December 2019, he was added to Sri Lanka's Test squad for their tour to Sri Lankan cricket team in Pakistan in 2019–20. He replaced Suranga Lakmal, who was ruled out of the tour due to dengue fever. In March 2020, he was added to Sri Lanka's Twenty20 International (T20I) squad for the series against the West Indies, replacing Nuwan Pradeep.

In December 2020, Fernando was named in Sri Lanka's Test squad for their series against South Africa. He made his Test debut for Sri Lanka, against South Africa, on 3 January 2021. In February 2021, Fernando was named in Sri Lanka's T20I squad for their series against the West Indies. In July 2021, he was named in Sri Lanka's squad for their series against India.

In May 2022, in the second match of the series against Bangladesh, Fernando took his first five-wicket haul in Test cricket in second innings, with 6/51. He also took four wickets in first innings. In that process he took 10 for 141 from the match. This is his first 10-wicket haul. In August 2022, he was named in Sri Lanka's T20I squad for the 2022 Asia Cup. He made his T20I debut on 1 September 2022, against Bangladesh.

In May 2024, he was named as a reserve player in Sri Lanka's squad for the 2024 ICC Men's T20 World Cup tournament.

On August 30, 2024, second test match against England at Lords Asitha took his second five wicket haul (5/102) . He became only the second Sri Lankan bowler after Rumesh Ratnayake to have his name in the Lord's Honours Board. Asitha describe this feat as dream come true for him. Due to his performance he reached 8th place in ICC test bowling rankings.

Asitha became highest wicket taker in the series taking 17 wickets in 3 matches with average of 24.64 including one five wicket haul and one four wicket haul.

On 18 June 2025, first test match against Bangladesh Asitha took four wicket haul. His first four wicket haul on home soil.

On July 6, 2026, second test match against West Indies Asitha took his third five wicket haul (5/130), first against West Indies. He bowled short balls against West Indies batsmen and due to his patience, hostility and intelligence managed to took wickets. Despite his efforts the match ended in draw.

On August 18, 2026, first test match against India, Asitha took four wickets in second innings using bounsers against batsmen. He continued his good form onto the second match, claiming another four wicket haul in first innings. Due to his accurate, intense, indefatiguable bowling performance, Sri Lanka bowling coach Ryan van Niekerk has taken to calling him the "diesel engine".

During first test match against Pakistan Asitha took his 100th test match wicket. He is the fastest Sri Lankan fast bowler to take 100 wickets achieving it in 48 innings and 6th Sri Lankan fast baller to take 100 wickets in test cricket. In addition to the record, Fernando also has the best bowling average amongst the six fast bowlers from Sri Lanka who have crossed the 100-wicket mark in Test cricket.

== Achievements ==
- Sri Lanka Cricket Best Men's ODI Bowler of the Year: 2025
