= Isitha Wijesundara =

Sri Lankan cricketer (born 1997)

Personal information
- Full name: Isitha Dew Wijesundara
- Born: 11 May 1997 (age 29); Colombo
- Batting: Left-handed
- Bowling: Right arm Fast-Medium
- Role: Bowling All-rounder

International information
- National side: Sri Lanka (2026)
- Only Test (cap 171): 3 July 2026 v West Indies

Domestic team information
- Years: Team
- 2016–2022: Panadura Sports Club
- 2019/20–2022/23: Saracens Sports Club
- 2020/21: Kandy Customs Sports Club
- 2023/24: Sebastianites Cricket and Athletic Club
- 2024: Bloomfield Cricket and Athletic Club
- 2024: Colombo Strikers
- 2025: Ace Capital Cricket Club
- Source: Cricinfo, 3 July 2026

Isitha Wijesundara (born 11 May 1997) is a Sri Lankan cricketer. He made his List A debut on 15 December 2019, for Saracens Sports Club in the 2019–20 Invitation Limited Over Tournament. He made his Twenty20 debut on 5 March 2021, for Kandy Customs Cricket Club in the 2020–21 SLC Twenty20 Tournament.

== Education ==
He was educated at Thurstan College, Colombo 07, and the University of Sri Jayewardenepura.

== International career ==
Isitha Wijesundara made his international debut for Sri Lanka in the 2nd Test against West Indies on 3rd July 2026.
