= Michael Tissera =

Sri Lankan cricketer (born 1939)

Deshabandu Michael Tissera
Personal information
- Full name: Michael Hugh Tissera
- Born: 23 March 1939 (age 87); Colombo, Ceylon
- Batting: Right-handed
- Bowling: Legbreak

International information
- National side: Sri Lanka (1975)
- ODI debut (cap 10): 7 June 1975 v West Indies
- Last ODI: 14 June 1975 v Pakistan

Career statistics
| Competition | ODI | First-class |
|---|---|---|
| Matches | 3 | 30 |
| Runs scored | 78 | 1,394 |
| Batting average | 26.00 | 28.44 |
| 100s/50s | 0/1 | 2/8 |
| Top score | 52 | 122 |
| Balls bowled | – | 1,474 |
| Wickets | – | 27 |
| Bowling average | – | 31.70 |
| 5 wickets in innings | – | 1 |
| 10 wickets in match | – | 0 |
| Best bowling | – | 5/95 |
| Catches/stumpings | 0/– | 15/– |
- Source: Cricinfo, 1 May 2016

Michael Hugh Tissera (born 23 March 1939) is a former Sri Lankan cricketer who played in the 1975 Cricket World Cup.

== School ==
Tissera was born at Colombo and educated at S. Thomas' College, Mount Lavinia, where, initially appearing in 1954 aged fourteen, he captained the Thomian cricket team in the Royal–Thomian series, known as "The Battle of the Blues", in 1957 and 1958. He made his first-class debut in March 1959, in the annual Gopalan Trophy encounter between Ceylon and Madras.

== International career ==
Tissera captained Ceylon to its first victory over a Test-playing nation in Ahmedabad in 1965, when his bold declaration in a low-scoring match led to victory over India by four wickets. He was selected as vice-captain for the tour of England with the Ceylon team in 1968, but the tour was cancelled just before it was due to begin.

He made his two first-class centuries in unofficial Test matches for Ceylon. The first was against India in the second unofficial Test in India in 1964–65, when he made 122 in the second innings, adding 224 for the fourth wicket with Stanley Jayasinghe. The second was in the third unofficial Test in Pakistan in 1966-67, when he made 120 not out, also in the second innings.

He played three ODIs in the 1975 World Cup, scoring 52 against Australia in the second match. A stalwart of Sri Lankan cricket, he managed the national team between 2005 and 2007.

== Legacy ==
Test matches between West Indies and Sri Lanka are now played for the Sobers-Tissera Trophy, in honour of Tissera and Gary Sobers. Tissera was awarded the Sri Lankan honour Deshabandu in 1987. In September 2018, he was one of 49 former Sri Lankan cricketers felicitated by Sri Lanka Cricket, to honour them for their services before Sri Lanka became a full member of the International Cricket Council (ICC).

== See also ==
- Sobers-Tissera Trophy
