= Sir Vivian Richards Stadium =

Cricket ground

Coordinates: 17°6′12″N 61°47′5″W

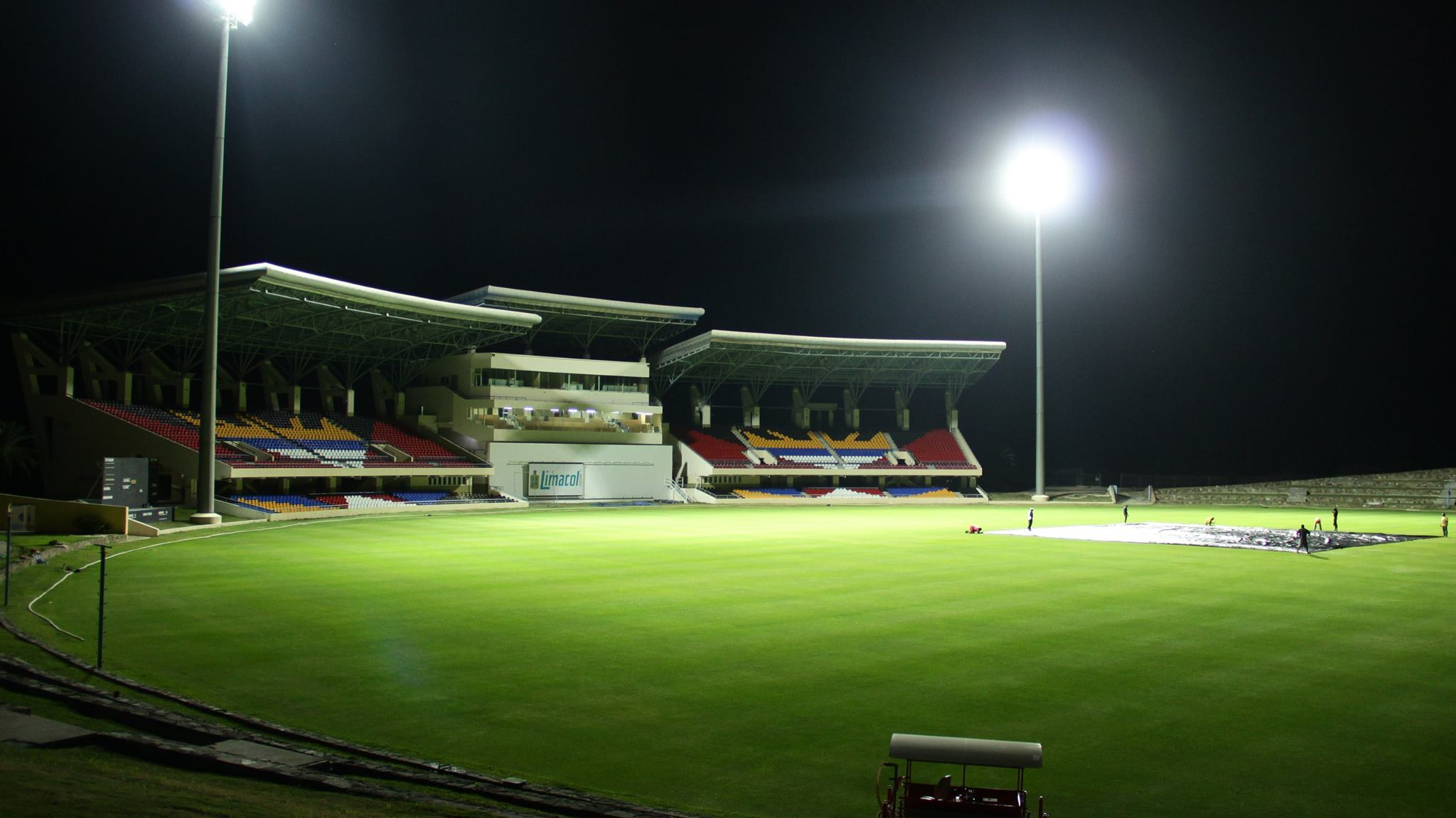
- The stadium in 2015
- Interactive map of Sir Vivian Richards Stadium

Ground information
- Location: North Sound, Saint George, Antigua and Barbuda
- Country: West Indies
- Establishment: 2006
- Capacity: 10,000
- End names
- Andy Roberts End; Curtly Ambrose End

International information
- First men's Test: 30 May–3 June 2008: West Indies v Australia
- Last men's Test: 25–28 June 2026: West Indies v Sri Lanka
- First men's ODI: 27–28 March 2007: West Indies v Australia
- Last men's ODI: 6 December 2023: West Indies v England
- First men's T20I: 19 May 2010: West Indies v South Africa
- Last men's T20I: 23 June 2024: West Indies v South Africa
- First women's ODI: 8 September 2019: West Indies v Australia
- Last women's ODI: 9 December 2022: West Indies v England
- First women's T20I: 18 February 2012: West Indies v India
- Last women's T20I: 11 December 2022: West Indies v England
- As of 22 November 2024; Source: Cricinfo

Sir Vivian Richards Stadium is a stadium in North Sound, Saint George, Antigua and Barbuda. It was built for use in the 2007 Cricket World Cup where it hosted Super 8 matches. The stadium usually caters for 10,000 people, but temporary seating doubled its capacity for the 2007 World Cup. The stadium is named after former West Indies cricket captain Vivian Richards.

== Location ==
The stadium is about 10–20 minutes' drive from the largest city, St. John's, and the country's international airport. It can be accessed from the Sir Sydney Walling Highway. The venue cost approximately US$60 million to build, with the majority of the funds coming from a Chinese Government grant. The first Test match staged on the ground began on 30 May 2008 when the West Indies hosted Australia, with the match ending in a draw.

== Facilities ==
The stadium constitutes two main stands: the Northern Stand and the five-storey South Stand. In 2008, the roof of the South Stand was damaged by high winds. Other facilities include a practice pitch for the various cricket teams, training infrastructure and a media centre. Sir Viv Richards Stadium is one of the few state-of-the-art venues that encompass underground passageways for the cricket teams to move about in.

Prior to the start of the first Test against England on 13 April 2015, the north and south ends were renamed for two former West Indies cricketers, Sir Curtly Ambrose and Sir Andy Roberts.

== Outfield controversy ==
The ground's second Test match against England on 13 February 2009 was abandoned after only ten balls due to the outfield's dangerous condition.

The groundstaff had applied extra layers of sand after recent heavy rain, and again after a brief shower the morning of the match; this resulted in West Indian bowlers Jerome Taylor and Fidel Edwards being unable to gain any traction when running in.

The sandy nature of the outfield had earned the ground the nickname of 'Antigua's 366th beach' in the buildup to the game.

Following the abandonment, inquiries were held by the WICB and the ICC: these caused great embarrassment for West Indies cricket.

The ICC subsequently ordered that the ground be suspended from staging any international matches for twelve months, and an official warning was issued to the WICB.

== List of five wicket hauls ==
=== Tests ===
Fourteen five wicket hauls in Test matches have been taken at the venue.

No.	Bowler	Date	Team	Opposing team	Inn	Overs	Runs	Wkts	Econ	Result
1	Brett Lee	30 May 2008	Australia	West Indies	2	21	59	5	2.8	Drawn
2	Sunil Narine	25 July 2012	West Indies	New Zealand	1	43	132	5	3.06	Won
3	Kemar Roach	25 July 2012	West Indies	New Zealand	3	23.2	60	5	2.57	Won
4	Ravichandran Ashwin	21 July 2016	India	West Indies	3	25	83	7	3.32	Won
5	Kemar Roach	4 July 2018	West Indies	Bangladesh	1	5	8	5	1.6	Won
6	Shannon Gabriel	4 July 2018	West Indies	Bangladesh	3	12	77	5	6.41	Won
7	Ishant Sharma	22 August 2019	India	West Indies	2	17	43	5	2.52	Won
8	Jasprit Bumrah	22 August 2019	India	West Indies	4	8	7	5	0.87	Won
9	Jason Holder	21 March 2021	West Indies	Sri Lanka	1	17.4	27	5	1.52	Drawn
10	Justin Greaves	27 July 2026	West Indies	Pakistan	1	11	27	5	1.52	Won
11	Suranga Lakmal	21 March 2021	Sri Lanka	West Indies	2	25	47	5	1.88	Drawn
12	Kemar Roach	16 June 2022	West Indies	Bangladesh	3	24.5	53	5	2.13	Won
13	Taskin Ahmed	22 November 2024	Bangladesh	West Indies	3	14.1	64	6	4.51	Lost
14	Milan Rathnayake	25 June 2026	Sri Lanka	West Indies	2	35.5	124	5	3.46	Lost

=== One Day Internationals ===
One five wicket haul in One-Day Internationals has been taken at the venue.

No.	Bowler	Date	Team	Opposing team	Inn	Overs	Runs	Wkts	Econ	Result
1	Jason Holder	2 July 2017	West Indies	India	2	9.4	27	5	2.79	Won

=== Twenty20 Internationals ===
Three five wicket hauls in Twenty20 Internationals have been taken at the venue.

No.	Bowler	Date	Team	Opposing team	Inn	Overs	Runs	Wkts	Econ	Result
1	Ryan McLaren	19 May 2010	South Africa	West Indies	2	3.5	19	5	4.95	Won
2	Hernán Fennell	10 November 2021	Argentina	Panama	2	4	18	6	4.5	Won
3	Dillon Heyliger	13 November 2021	Canada	Argentina	1	4	16	5	4	Won

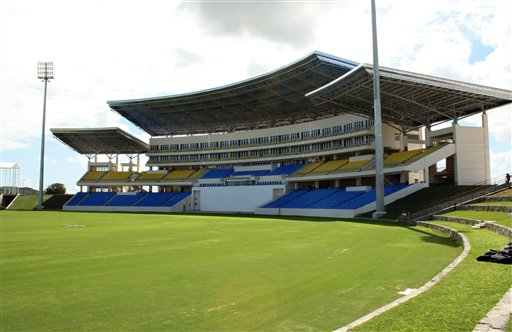
The stadium in 2012

== 2024 ICC Men's T20 World Cup matches ==
9 June 2024
13:00 UTC−4
Scorecard

Oman; 150/7 (20 overs)	v	Scotland; 153/3 (13.1 overs)
Pratik Athavale 54 (40); Safyaan Sharif 2/40 (4 overs)		Brandon McMullen 61* (31); Bilal Khan 1/12 (2.1 overs)

Scotland won by 7 wickets
Sir Vivian Richards Stadium, North Sound, Antigua
Umpires: Chris Brown (NZ) and Allahudien Palekar (SA)
Player of the match: Brandon McMullen (Sco)

- Oman won the toss and elected to bat.
- Oman were eliminated as a result of this match.

11 June 2024
20:30 UTC−4 (N)
Scorecard

Namibia; 72 (17 overs)	v	Australia; 74/1 (5.4 overs)
Gerhard Erasmus 36 (43); Adam Zampa 4/12 (4 overs)		Travis Head 34* (17); David Wiese 1/15 (1 over)

Australia won by 9 wickets
Sir Vivian Richards Stadium, North Sound
Umpires: Nitin Menon (Ind) and Rashid Riaz (Pak)
Player of the match: Adam Zampa (Aus)

- Australia won the toss and elected to field.
- Adam Zampa (Aus) became the first Australian cricketer to take 100 wickets in T20Is.
- Australia qualified for the Super 8 while Namibia were eliminated as a result of this match.

13 June 2024
15:00 UTC−4
Scorecard

Oman; 47 (13.2 overs)	v	England; 50/2 (3.1 overs)
Shoaib Khan 11 (23); Adil Rashid 4/11 (4 overs)		Jos Buttler 24* (8); Kaleemullah 1/10 (1 overs)

England won by 8 wickets
Sir Vivian Richards Stadium, North Sound
Umpires: Langton Rusere (Zim) and Asif Yaqoob (Pak)
Player of the match: Adil Rashid (Eng)

- England won the toss and elected to field.

15 June 2024
13:00 UTC−4
Scorecard

England; 122/5 (10 overs)	v	Namibia; 84/3 (10 overs)
Harry Brook 47* (20); Ruben Trumpelmann 2/31 (2 overs)		Michael van Lingen 33 (29); Jofra Archer 1/15 (2 overs)

England won by 41 runs (DLS method)
Sir Vivian Richards Stadium, North Sound
Umpires: Adrian Holdstock (SA) and Langton Rusere (Zim)
Player of the match: Harry Brook (Eng)

- Namibia won the toss and elected to field.
- The match was reduced to 11 overs per side due to rain, and later to 10 overs per side.
- Namibia were set a revised target of 126 from 10 overs due to rain.

=== Super 8s ===
19 June 2024
10:30 UTC−4
Scorecard

South Africa; 194/4 (20 overs)	v	United States; 176/6 (20 overs)
Quinton de Kock 74 (40); Saurabh Netravalkar 2/21 (4 overs)		Andries Gous 80* (47); Kagiso Rabada 3/18 (4 overs)

South Africa won by 18 runs
Sir Vivian Richards Stadium, North Sound
Umpires: Chris Gaffaney (NZ) and Richard Kettleborough (Eng)
Player of the match: Quinton de Kock (SA)

- United States won the toss and elected to field.
- This was the first time South Africa and United States faced each other in T20Is.

20 June 2024
20:30 UTC−4 (N)
Scorecard

Bangladesh; 140/8 (20 overs)	v	Australia; 100/2 (11.2 overs)
Najmul Hossain Shanto 41 (36); Pat Cummins 3/29 (4 overs)		David Warner 53* (35); Rishad Hossain 2/23 (3 overs)

Australia won by 28 runs (DLS method)
Sir Vivian Richards Stadium, North Sound
Umpires: Michael Gough (Eng) and Richard Illingworth (Eng)
Player of the match: Pat Cummins (Aus)

- Australia won the toss and elected to field.
- Rain prevented any further play.
- Australia were above the DLS par score of 72 in 11.2 overs.
- Pat Cummins (Aus) took his first hat-trick in T20Is.

22 June 2024
10:30 UTC−4
Scorecard

India; 196/5 (20 overs)	v	Bangladesh; 146/8 (20 overs)
Hardik Pandya 50* (27); Tanzim Hasan Sakib 2/32 (4 overs)		Najmul Hossain Shanto 40 (32); Kuldeep Yadav 3/19 (4 overs)

India won by 50 runs
Sir Vivian Richards Stadium, North Sound
Umpires: Michael Gough (Eng) and Adrian Holdstock (SA)
Player of the match: Hardik Pandya (Ind)

- Bangladesh won the toss and elected to field.
- Shakib Al Hasan (Ban) became the first bowler to take 50 wickets in T20 World Cup history.

23 June 2024
20:30 UTC−4 (N)
Scorecard

West Indies; 135/8 (20 overs)	v	South Africa; 124/7 (16.1 overs)
Roston Chase 52 (42); Tabraiz Shamsi 3/27 (4 overs)		Tristan Stubbs 29 (27); Roston Chase 3/12 (3 overs)

South Africa won by 3 wickets (DLS method)
Sir Vivian Richards Stadium, North Sound
Umpires: Rod Tucker (Aus) and Alex Wharf (Eng)
Player of the match: Tabraiz Shamsi (SA)

- South Africa won the toss and elected to field.
- South Africa were set a revised target of 123 runs off 17 overs due to rain.
- South Africa qualified for the semi-finals while West Indies were eliminated as a result of this match.

== See also ==
- List of Test cricket grounds
- Stanford Cricket Ground
