= Jomel Warrican =

Vincentian cricketer

Personal information
- Full name: Jomel Andrel Warrican
- Born: 20 May 1992 (age 34); Richmond Hill, Saint Vincent
- Batting: Right-handed
- Bowling: Slow left-arm orthodox
- Role: Bowler

International information
- National side: West Indies (2015–present)
- Test debut (cap 305): 22 October 2015 v Sri Lanka
- Last Test: 5 November 2026 v Bangladesh

Domestic team information
- Years: Team
- 2012–present: Barbados
- 2015: St Kitts and Nevis Patriots
- –Present: Barbados Royals

Career statistics
Competition	Test	FC	LA	T20
Matches	27	109	39	3
Runs scored	398	1,480	155	0
Batting average	13.72	12.75	9.11	–
100s/50s	0/0	0/1	0/0	0/0
Top score	41	71*	24	0*
Balls bowled	5,615	20,656	1,880	54
Wickets	100	425	37	2
Bowling average	27.72	21.45	37.13	41.00
5 wickets in innings	4	28	0	0
10 wickets in match	1	6	0	0
Best bowling	7/32	8/34	4/25	1/17
Catches/stumpings	9/–	56/–	8/–	1/–
- Source: ESPNcricinfo, 6 August 2026

Jomel Andrel Warrican (born 20 May 1992) is a Vincentian cricketer. He is a slow left-arm orthodox bowler and a right-handed tail-end batsman.

In September 2015 he was named in the Test squad for the West Indies tour to Sri Lanka. He made his Test debut against Sri Lanka on 22 October 2015, taking 4 wickets for 67 runs on the first day.

== Early career ==
Born in Saint Vincent, Warrican moved to Barbados and attended Combermere School and joined the Empire Cricket Club. He was awarded the Lord Gavron Award for promising young cricketers in Barbados alongside Jason Holder in 2009 before representing the West Indies at the 2010 ICC Under-19 Cricket World Cup. He was the second Gavron Award winner to spend a season playing for Sefton Park in the Liverpool and District Cricket Competition in 2011, taking 51 wickets and scoring 373 runs. Warrican continued to impress on his return to the Caribbean and made his first-class debut for Barbados in March 2012 although a regular place wasn't claimed until his success in the 2014 season when he both led the BCA Elite Cricket league wicket-takers and broke the record for a slow bowler as he helped Empire to win the 3-day game championship. This form was carried in the Regional Four Day Competition where he took 49 wickets including two 8 wicket hauls.

== International career ==
In June 2020, Warrican was named as one of eleven reserve players in the West Indies' Test squad, for their series against England. The Test series was originally scheduled to start in May 2020, but was moved back to July 2020 due to the COVID-19 pandemic. In December 2024, he was named in the West Indies squad for the two-match test series against Pakistan. He was named player of the match in the second test for taking 9 wickets across two innings. He was also declared player of the series for his 19 wickets in two matches.
