= Kemar Roach =

Barbadian cricketer (born 1988)

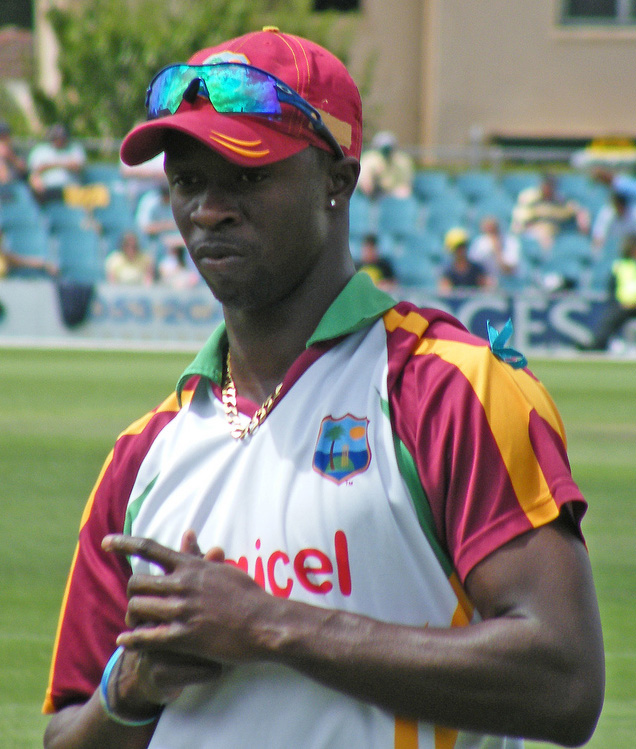
- Roach in 2010

Personal information
- Full name: Kemar Andre Jamal Roach
- Born: 30 June 1988 (age 38); Saint Lucy, Barbados
- Height: 173 cm (5 ft 8 in)
- Batting: Right-handed
- Bowling: Right-arm fast-medium
- Role: Bowler

International information
- National side: West Indies (2008–present)
- Test debut (cap 279): 9 July 2009 v Bangladesh
- Last Test: 25 June 2026 v Sri Lanka
- ODI debut (cap 144): 20 August 2008 v Bermuda
- Last ODI: 11 February 2022 v India
- T20I debut (cap 28): 20 June 2008 v Australia
- Last T20I: 10 December 2012 v Bangladesh

Domestic team information
- Years: Team
- 2006/07–present: Barbados
- 2010: Deccan Chargers
- 2011: Worcestershire
- 2012/13–2013/14: Brisbane Heat
- 2013: Antigua Hawksbills
- 2015: St Lucia Zouks
- 2015: Jamaica Tallawahs
- 2021–2025: Surrey
- 2026: Durham

Career statistics
Competition	Test	ODI	T20I	FC
Matches	89	95	11	187
Runs scored	1,363	308	3	2,502
Batting average	12.16	12.83	–	12.83
100s/50s	0/1	0/0	0/0	0/4
Top score	58*	34	3*	58*
Balls bowled	15,544	4,579	234	29,376
Wickets	300	125	10	595
Bowling average	26.83	31.1	28.40	26.27
5 wickets in innings	12	3	0	24
10 wickets in match	1	0	0	2
Best bowling	6/48	6/27	2/25	8/40
Catches/stumpings	28/–	22/–	1/–	61/–
- Source: ESPNcricinfo, 29 June 2026

Kemar Andre Jamal Roach (born 30 June 1988) is a Barbadian right-handed fast-medium bowler who plays international cricket for the West Indies cricket team. A 5-foot-8-inch (1.73 m) bowler, Roach initially reached speeds of over 90 mph on regular occasions. After some time he adapted his bowling style, due to injuries and diminished pace, to encourage augmented swing and movement of the ball. He triumphantly claimed the BBL02 title with the Brisbane Heat and was an essential part of the Surrey side which eventually won the 2022 County Championship title. During 2012 he became the first West Indies bowler to take ten wickets in a Test since 2005. Roach has since picked up over 300 wickets in Tests and over 100 ODI wickets for the Windies. He has also featured for Barbados, Deccan Chargers, Worcestershire along with CPL teams Antigua Hawksbills, St Lucia Zouks and Jamaica Tallawahs in his cricketing career. Roach made history for the West Indies as he was the first West Indian bowler to take a hat-trick in a Cricket World Cup, which he did against the Netherlands during the 2011 tournament.

== International career ==
=== Early representation ===
On 7 June 2008, Roach was selected in the West Indies Test squad to face Australia in the third Test. At the time he had played in only four first-class matches. He was not picked for the final team and said "I know that when a Test match comes around, they sometimes draft in players in the island where the match is, but I wasn't expecting to be in the squad. I'm quite happy to be there. If selected, I want to put in a good performance". Roach made his international debut on 20 June 2008 in a Twenty20 international against Australia; it was also the first senior Twenty20 match he had played in. He finished with the best bowling figures in the match of 2/29 from three overs, claiming the scalps of Shaun Marsh and Luke Ronchi as the West Indies won by seven wickets. Roach was drafted into the squad for the last two ODIs against Australia in July 2008 after Australia won the first three games and sealed a series victory.

Roach did not play in the last two matches of the series against Australia and had to wait until the triangular series with Bermuda and Canada to make his debut. On 20 August 2008 Roach – along with fellow debutants Leon Johnson and Brendan Nash – made his first appearance for the West Indies in a One Day International. He finished with figures of 10–1–29–2 as the West Indies beat Bermuda by six wickets. His first wicket was that of Steven Outerbridge and his second was the Bermuda captain, Irving Romaine. He played in the second match of the series, taking 1/49 from eight overs against Canada as the West Indies won by 49 runs but did not play in the final against Canada which the West Indies won.

On 1 November 2008, the ODI squad to tour Pakistan was announced, with Roach as one of the members. John Dyson, the West Indies coach, said that Roach was expected to put the more experienced and established bowlers such as Fidel Edwards and Jerome Taylor under pressure for a place in the team. On the same day, it was announced that Roach was one of four players – along with Lionel Baker, Leon Johnson, and Brendan Nash – without a Test cap to be named in the 15-man squad selected to tour New Zealand for a Test series.

=== Breakthrough ===
Roach made his Test debut on 9 July 2009. He was part of an understrength team fielded by the West Indies against Bangladesh; in the 15-man squad, there were nine uncapped players and in the Test seven West Indies players made their debut. The side was captained by Floyd Reifer who had played the last of his four Tests ten years earlier. The first XI had made themselves unavailable due to a pay dispute with the West Indies Cricket Board. His first Test wicket was that of all-rounder Shakib Al Hasan. Although Bangladesh won by 95 runs, Roach helped put pressure on the Bangladesh batsmen through a combination of yorkers and swinging deliveries, although he bowled slightly wide to the left-handers. Reifer praised Roach's efforts, saying "The first time I saw him as an under-19 bowler, I always thought he was going to play for West Indies. He does a lot, especially with the old ball, getting it to move in and out and he performed very well this morning, bowling decent lengths and lines". Although Bangladesh won the second Test to take the series 2–0, Roach again bowled with pace and aggression, unsettling the Bangladesh batsmen. Varying his length and exploiting the Bangladesh batsmen's weakness against short bowling – even hitting Raqibul Hasan on the elbow with one delivery – Roach proceeded to take career-best figures of 6/48 in the first innings. With 13 wickets to his name, Roach finished as West Indies' leading wicket-taker from the series. Although Bangladesh won the three-match ODI series that followed 3–0, Roach was leading wicket-taker for the series, with 10 wickets at an average of 16.20; in the first of the ODIs he took his maiden five-wicket haul in one day matches (5/44), beating his previous best figures of 2/29. In the second ODI, Roach was fined 10% of his match fee for bowling two beamers. The core of the same squad was retained for September's 2009 ICC Champions Trophy. Roach played in two of West Indies' three matches, as they exited the tournament in the first round, and took three wickets at 33.33.

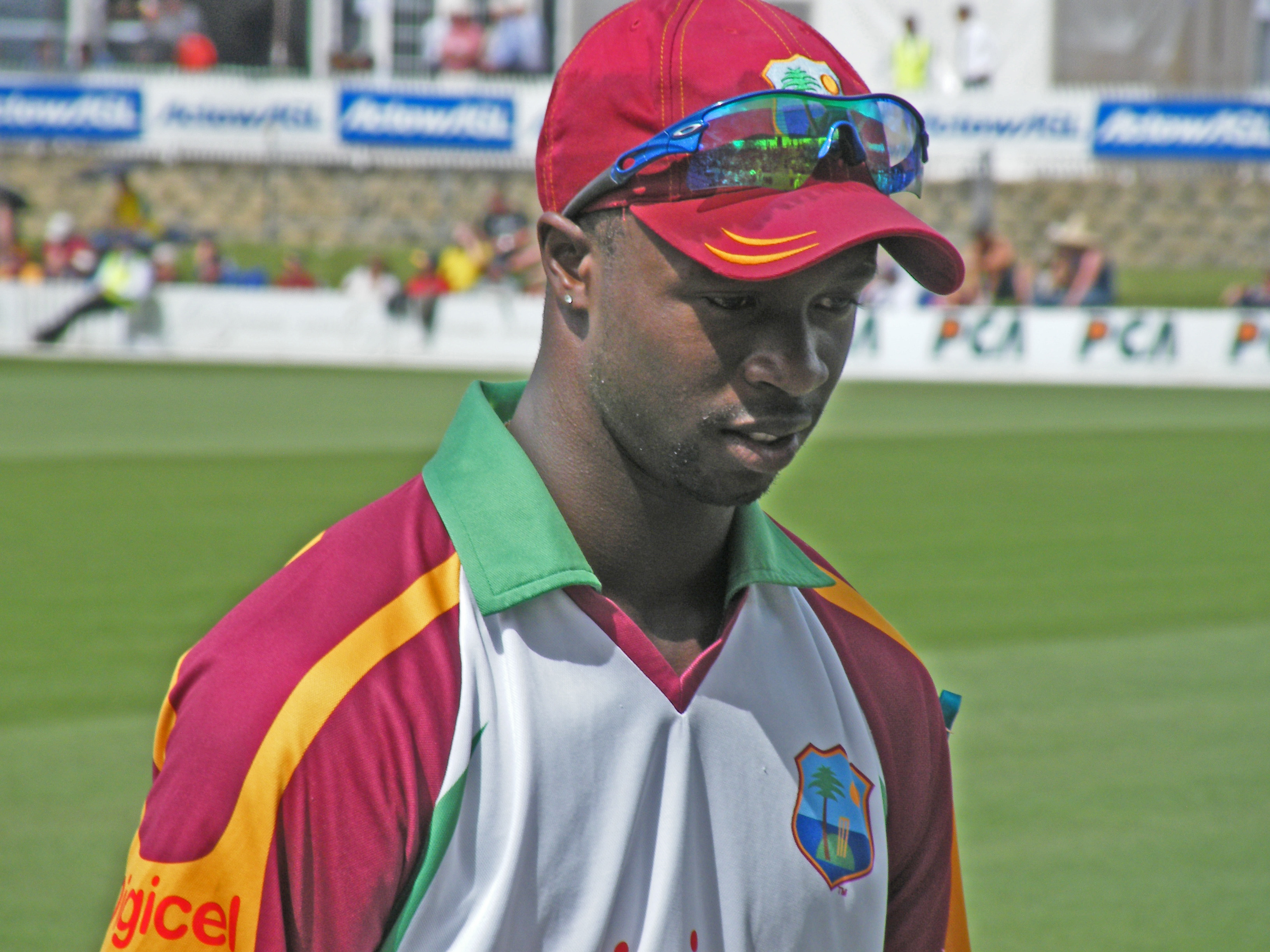
Roach during West Indies tour of Australia in February 2010

Shortly before West Indies embarked on a tour of Australia in November to December 2009; senior players such as Chris Gayle and Shivnarine Chanderpaul returned to the squad, but Roach had sufficiently impressed selectors during the dispute that he retained his place. The West Indies lost the first Test in three days; Adrian Barath's century on debut and Roach's bowling performance were the main positives for the West Indies; in the opinion of former Australia captain Ian Chappell, Roach's bowling was "exceptionally good" but he lacked support from more senior bowlers. Although the West Indies drew the second Test, Roach (who was regularly bowling over 150 kilometres per hour (93 mph)) and Dwayne Bravo took the West Indies close to levelling the series on the final day of the match. Australia's captain, Ricky Ponting, commended Roach for his control and accuracy and said "Someone who is pretty short at that pace can get the ball to skid onto you pretty quickly off the wicket with not much bounce. We've played him pretty well here [in Adelaide]. The ball reverse-swung for them in both innings. He's a handful, there's no doubt about that. He's someone who could play a fair bit of Test cricket for them in the future." It was the opinion of Tony Cozier that in the absence of experienced fast bowlers Jerome Taylor and Fidel Edwards, Roach was the leader of the bowling attack in Australia. Roach, who was fastest of the West Indies' bowling line-up, troubled the Australian batsmen with his pace through the series, and a rivalry emerged between Roach and Ponting. In the first innings of the third and final Test, Roach struck Ponting on the elbow, who was forced to retire hurt. However, he was forced to bowl into the wind, which surprised Australian batsmen Shane Watson as it reduced Roach's pace.

Roach was one of the most sought-after players at the 2010 IPL auctions along with Kieron Pollard and Shane Bond. He was involved in a tug-of-war as both Chennai Super Kings and Deccan Chargers were fiercely bidding on him. Finally the latter managed to get him for a fee of US$720,000 as the Super Kings had another slot to fill and could not go beyond US$700,000. He played just two matches for the Chargers in the 2010 season, against Mumbai Indians and Kolkata Knight Riders

The West Indies hosted the 2010 ICC World Twenty20 in April and May. West Indies exited the competition in the first round; Roach played in three of the team's matches, and was West Indies' second highest wicket-taker (5 wickets at an average of 15.40) behind Darren Sammy. After the tournament South Africa remained in the West Indies for their tour of the region in June 2010. South Africa won the three-match Test series 2–0; Roach played in two matches, taking 6 wickets at an average of 31. In the third Test, Roach was involved in an incident with Jacques Kallis; he "repeatedly walked up to and exchanged words with the batsman after testing him with a series of bouncers". As a result, Roach was fined 50% of his match fee.

Roach was part of the West Indies squad which toured Sri Lanka in November and December 2010. Senior bowlers Jerome Taylor and Fidel Edwards were absent, leaving Roach as the head of the attack. In the lead up, he attempted to develop his use of swing to cope with Sri Lankan pitches traditionally unhelpful to fast bowlers. Roach remarked "I still have a little bit of work to do on my lengths, but I'm satisfied with what I got out of the camp". Roach's performance in the Tests, finishing as the West Indies lead wicket-taker with 10 wickets at an average of 24.50 for which he was named Man of the Series, was highlighted by Sammy, the team's captain, as one of the best performances of the drawn series.

In February 2011 Bangladesh, India, and Sri Lanka hosted the 50-over World Cup. In the West Indies' second game of the tournament, Roach became the sixth bowler to have claimed a hat-trick in a World Cup, and the first West Indies bowler to do so. He dismissed Pieter Seelaar, Bernard Loots, and Berend Westdijk for his hat-trick and went on to claim 6/27, the fourth-best bowling figures by a West Indies player in ODIs. He was the West Indies' leading wicket-taker in the tournament with 13 wickets from 6 matches. Roach played just four Tests in 2011, and took seven wickets at a cost of over 50 runs each. Five players bowled more overs in Tests for the West Indies, and each took more wickets and had a better bowling average; four of them took more than 30 wickets. Despite not regularly featuring in the Test side, Roach finished the year as the team's leading wicket-taker in ODIs with 30 dismissals from 23 matches at an average of 31.16. Roach signed a contract in August 2011 to represent Worcestershire in English domestic cricket. At the time the club was struggling to avoid relegation from the first division of the County Championship, the first-class competition, and in the final game of the season managed to ensure they stayed up. According to Roach Worcestershire's seam bowler Alan Richardson helped him learn how to bowl in English conditions, and took 14 first-class wickets at an average of 39.28.

Australia embarked on a tour of the West Indies in March 2012. In the second match of the three-Test series Roach completed his first ten-wicket haul, thereby becoming the first bowler to take ten wickets in a match for the West Indies since Corey Collymore in 2005; the last West Indian player to achieve the feat against Australia was Curtly Ambrose in 1993. Though the West Indies lost 2–0, Roach's 19 wickets for the series was the most for either side. When the West Indies toured England in May and June 2012, Roach struggled with bowling no balls. In the first Test at Lord's he bowled 18 of them, and in the next match he twice had Alastair Cook caught off a no ball. However, Jonny Bairstow struggled against Roach's bowling, in particular short-pitched bowling, and sustained several blows on the body before falling to Roach. He later propelled the Brisbane Heat, with figures of 3 for 18 from four overs, to a 34 run win over the Perth Scorchers and claim the BBL02 title.

=== Later career ===
On 30 June 2014, Roach picked up his 100th wicket in test match cricket, with BJ Watling caught by Jason Holder at point for 29, in the third test between the Windies and New Zealand at Kensington Oval, Bridgetown, Barbados. On 7 March 2018, Roach took his 100th ODI wicket, having Rohan Mustafa caught behind for eight by Shimron Hetmyer, in an eventual win over the UAE at the Old Hararians Sports Club. In June 2018, Roach claimed his 150th test wicket, dismissing Kusal Perera for 32, in the second test against Sri Lanka at Saint Lucia's Darren Sammy Cricket Ground. In October 2018, Cricket West Indies (CWI) awarded him a contract across all formats of cricket for the 2018–19 season. The following month, in the second Test away against Bangladesh, Roach played in his 50th Test match.

In April 2019, he was named in the West Indies' squad for the 2019 Cricket World Cup. He was later bestowed with the ESPNcricinfo's Test Bowling Performance of the Year Award for his spell of 5 for 17 in the first match of the 2019 test series against England played at Kensington Oval. In June 2020, Roach was named in the West Indies' Test squad, for their series against England. The Test series was originally scheduled to start in May 2020, but was moved back to July 2020 due to the COVID-19 pandemic. In the series' third match at the Old Trafford Cricket Ground, Roach, in bowling Chris Woakes, claimed his 200th wicket in Test cricket. In so doing he became the ninth west Indian along with the first in twenty six years to achieve the said landmark.

In 2021, Roach signed for Surrey County Cricket Club, joining up with the squad soon after Sri Lanka's tour of the Caribbean. In June 2022, Roach then dismissed Tamim Iqbal to claim his 250th wicket in Test cricket. This came in the second test against Bangladesh at the Darren Sammy Cricket Ground in St Lucia. With a sum of 25 wickets at 24.04, he was an essential part of the Surrey side which eventually won the 2022 County Championship title.

In 2026, during the test series against Sri Lanka, Roach took his 300th wicket in Tests during Sri Lanka' second innings, bowling Asitha Fernando as the West Indies eventually won the match by an innings and 217 runs.
