= Shane Dowrich =

Barbadian cricketer

Personal information
- Full name: Shane Omari Dowrich
- Born: 30 October 1991 (age 35); Barbados
- Batting: Right-handed
- Role: Wicket-keeper-batter

International information
- National side: West Indies
- Test debut (cap 303): 3 June 2015 v Australia
- Last Test: 3 December 2020 v New Zealand
- Only ODI (cap 191): 7 May 2019 v Bangladesh

Career statistics
Competition	Test	ODI	FC	LA
Matches	35	1	118	41
Runs scored	1,570	6	5,027	497
Batting average	29.07	6.00	33.29	16.56
100s/50s	3/9	0/0	7/30	0/0
Top score	125*	6	131*	48
Catches/stumpings	85/5	0/0	293/25	22/8
- Source: Cricinfo, 16 March 2023

Shane Omari Dowrich (born 30 October 1991) is a former Barbadian international cricketer who played as a wicket-keeper. He has featured for the West Indies, Barbados along with CPL teams St Kitts and Nevis Patriots and Barbados Tridents in his cricketing career. Dowrich is also the current captain of the Barbados' first class team.

== Early career ==
A Combermere School student who came through the YMPC Cricket Club, Dowrich represented the West Indies at the 2010 ICC Under-19 Cricket World Cup, making his first-class debut for Barbados at the age of 18 on his return, and was awarded the Lord Gavron Award for promising young cricketers in Barbados alongside Roston Chase at the end of the year. As part of this award, Dowrich spent the 2012 English season playing for Sefton Park in the Liverpool and District Cricket Competition, scoring two centuries as he totaled 733 league runs at an average of 52.35 despite returning to the Caribbean mid-season to play for West Indies A.

== International career ==
In May 2015 he was named in the 14-man Test squad to face Australia. He made an impressive start on his Test debut against Australia at Windsor Park, Roseau, Dominica. After conceding a lead of 170 in the first innings, West Indies were struggling at 3/37. He and Marlon Samuels added 144 runs for the fourth wicket before a collapse led West Indies to 216 all out and handed victory to Australia.

On 1 November 2017 Dowrich scored his maiden test century in the second test against Zimbabwe at the Queen's Sports Club, Bulawayo. On 7 June 2018 he notched 125 not out in the first test against Sri Lanka at the Queens Park Oval in Port of Spain, Trinidad and Tobago. In October 2018, Cricket West Indies (CWI) awarded him a red-ball contract for the 2018–19 season.

On 25 January 2019 Dowrich scored 116 not out in the first test against England at Kensington Oval, Bridgetown, Barbados. With this knock he put on a 295 run partnership with Jason Holder, with the twosome notching the highest unbeaten partnership and the third highest seventh wicket partnership in the history of test match cricket. In April 2019, he was named in the West Indies' One Day International (ODI) squad for the 2019 Ireland Tri-Nation Series. He made his ODI debut for the West Indies, in the second match of the tri-series, against Bangladesh on 7 May 2019.

In May 2019, Cricket West Indies (CWI) named him as one of ten reserve players in the West Indies' squad for the 2019 Cricket World Cup. In June 2020, Dorwich was named in the West Indies' Test squad, for their series against England. The Test series was originally scheduled to start in May 2020, but was moved back to July 2020 due to the COVID-19 pandemic.
