= Suranga Lakmal =

Sri Lankan cricketer

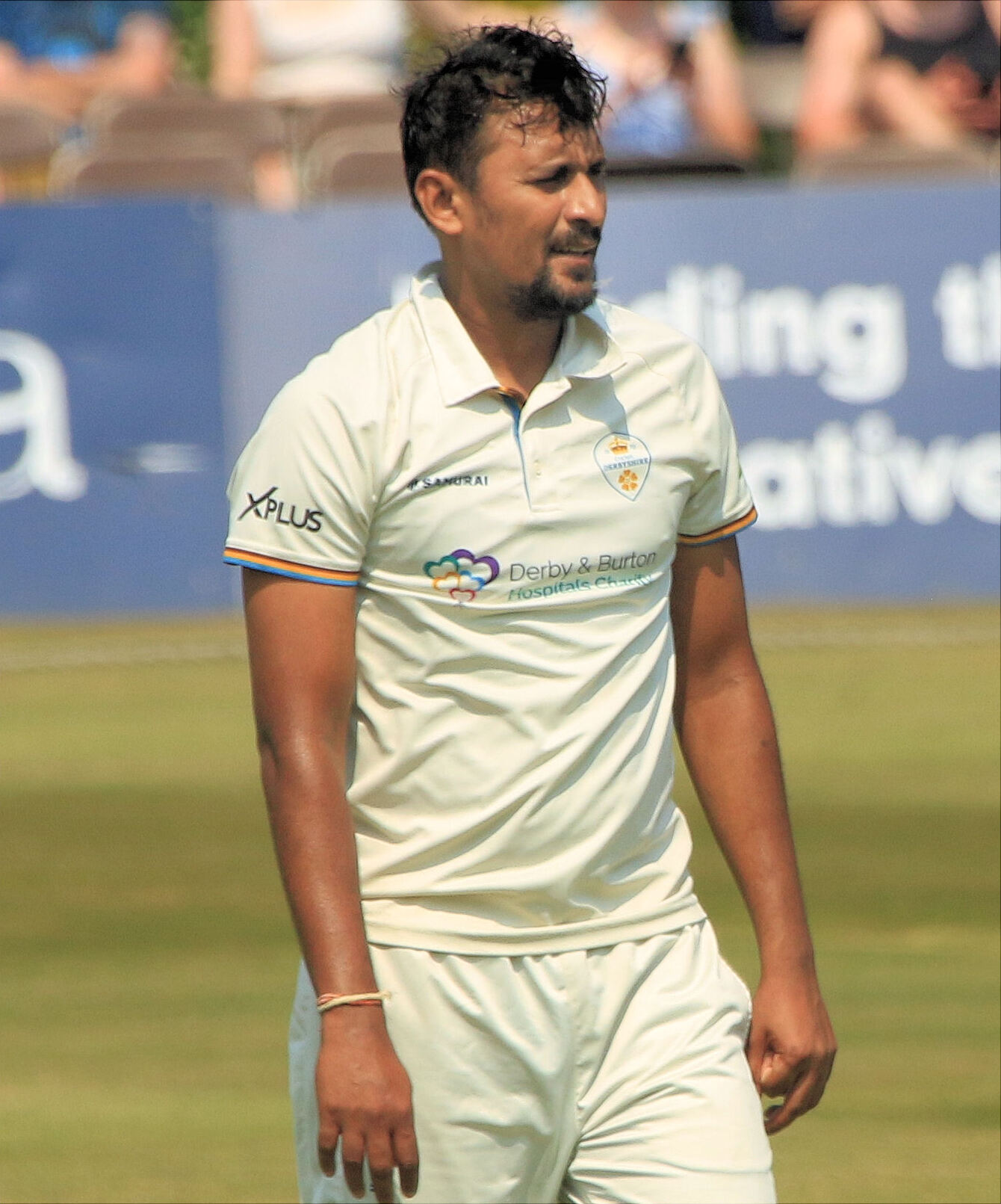
- Lakmal in 2023

Personal information
- Full name: Ranasinghe Arachchige Suranga Lakmal
- Born: 10 March 1987 (age 39); Tissamaharama, Sri Lanka
- Height: 1.94 m (6 ft 4 in)
- Batting: Right-handed
- Bowling: Right-arm fast-medium
- Role: Bowler

International information
- National side: Sri Lanka (2009–2022)
- Test debut (cap 114): 23 November 2010 v West Indies
- Last Test: 12 March 2022 v India
- ODI debut (cap 140): 18 December 2009 v India
- Last ODI: 14 March 2021 v West Indies
- T20I debut (cap 37): 25 June 2011 v England
- Last T20I: 24 March 2019 v South Africa

Domestic team information
- Years: Team
- 2007–2025: Tamil Union
- 2020–2022: Jaffna Kings
- 2022–2023: Derbyshire

Career statistics
Competition	Test	ODI	T20I	FC
Matches	70	86	11	141
Runs scored	934	244	7	1,567
Batting average	11.11	9.38	2.33	11.19
100s/50s	0/0	0/0	0/0	0/1
Top score	42	26	5*	58*
Balls bowled	12,443	3,881	208	22,252
Wickets	171	109	8	370
Bowling average	36.44	32.42	41.25	32.99
5 wickets in innings	4	0	0	10
10 wickets in match	0	0	0	0
Best bowling	5/47	4/13	2/26	6/68
Catches/stumpings	22/–	20/–	3/–	49/–
- Source: ESPNcricinfo, 28 March 2025

Ranasinghe Arachchige Suranga Lakmal (Sinhala: රණසිංහ ආරච්චිගේ සුරංග ලක්මාල්; born 10 March 1987) is a former professional Sri Lankan cricketer, who played in all formats of the game and is a former Test cricket captain. He is a right-arm fast bowler and right-handed batsman. He started his cricket life in Debarawewa National School, Tissamaharama. He was first included in the national squad for the tour of Pakistan in 2008-2009 and was reported to have been injured in the attack on the Sri Lankan team by terrorists.

He had to carry the so-called 'foreign objects' in his body during his playing career with the recommendation of the doctors in order to continue his cricketing career aftermath the 2009 Lahore attacks where he was severely injured. Doctors advised Lakmal to take a break from cricket for at least two years in order to remove the splinters on his right arm and leg and he also underwent complicated surgery to remove the splinters. He also had to deal with the circumstances of not being allowed to go pass the metal detectors during his overseas trips with the national side mainly due to the presence of the foreign objects in his body. Moreover, he also had to explain to security personnel on why he is carrying a piece of metal particle embedded in his left thigh whenever he passes through a security metal detector at international airports.

He was a regular feature in the test team and made sporadic appearances in limited overs cricket. He is only behind Chaminda Vaas for having taken the most wickets for Sri Lanka in test cricket with 168 and he is also the current fourth leading wicket taker for Sri Lanka in tests. He was also a useful bat often chipping with useful contributions batting down the low order. He insisted that his aim is to finish his career with 200 or 250 test wickets.

He largely played holding role in white ball limited overs matches although he had his moments leading the pace attack in crunch situations. He was relatively popular among the teammates in the national side and was highly heralded as a team man. He is known for his quick and accurate bowling action especially with the knack of generating big swing and lateral seam movement. He has taken five wicket hauls in three of four SENA nations including Australia, South Africa and New Zealand.

Due to spin favoring Sri Lankan conditions, he was often pushed him into the sidelines. He mostly played the holding role and bowled relatively lesser number of overs due to his inability to take wickets in spin friendly Sri Lankan pitches. However, he ended up taking 130 of is 168 career test wickets in away conditions and was often rewarded for his ability to hold a line and length over long periods of time in overseas conditions.

He also felt the heat at times being under scrutiny for being an injury prone and due to his fitness issues.

He currently plays for the Tamil Union Cricket and Athletic Club. On 2 February 2022, Lakmal announced that he would retire from all forms of international cricket following Sri Lanka's tour of India.

== Early days ==
Born in Hambantota district, Lakmal started his cricket career at his first school, Deberawewa Central College, in Hambantota.

He then attended Richmond College, Galle and played his senior school cricket at Richmond College. His talent was first spotted by fast bowling coaches of Sri Lanka Cricket while he was still schooling at Debarewewa Central. His progress was also closely monitored by the coaches when he transferred to the Richmond College. He initially lacked the stamina to bowl long spells due to lack of nutrition despite his natural talent and was also believed to have fallen ill during one of the occasions when he delivered a long spell at net session. He was looked after well and was groomed when he was inducted into the cricket academy especially knowing the fact that he hailed from an outstation area. His height and ability to get bounce and ability to extract swing at a tender age had caught the attention from cricketing circles. His wrist position and action were deemed as identical with the likes of Australian veteran Glenn McGrath.

His father was a farmer and he moved to Colombo from his native Hambantota to pursue his interest in cricket. He received imminent attention and support to pursue his career in cricket from Dinal Philips who then served as the President's Counsel for a considerable period of time and whom Lakmal later would later acknowledge as his father figure.

== Domestic career ==
He made his presence felt at domestic cricket since joining Tamil Union in 2007. He made his List A debut for Tamil Union against the Colts Cricket Club on 17 November 2007.

He made his first-class debut for Tamil Union against Nondescripts Cricket Club on 17 January 2008.

He made his T20 debut for Basnahira South against Wayamba on 23 April 2008. He was one of the three players earmarked for a bright future by Chandika Hathurusinghe way back in 2008 during Sri Lanka A's cricket tour of South Africa in 2008.

In March 2018, he was named the captain of Galle's squad for the 2017–18 Super Four Provincial Tournament. The following month, he was also named in Galle's squad for the 2018 Super Provincial One Day Tournament.

In August 2018, he was named as the captain of Galle's squad the 2018 SLC T20 League. In March 2019, he was named in Colombo's squad for the 2019 Super Provincial One Day Tournament. In October 2020, he was drafted by the Jaffna Stallions for the inaugural edition of the Lanka Premier League. In August 2021, he was named in the SLC Blues team for the 2021 SLC Invitational T20 League tournament. In November 2021, he was selected to play for the Jaffna Kings following the players' draft for the 2021 Lanka Premier League.

In February 2022, he signed a two-year deal with Derbyshire County Cricket Club after announcing his retirement from international cricket.

== International career ==
=== Early days ===
Lakmal was called up as a replacement for Dilhara Fernando in India in December 2009 and he made his ODI debut in the second match in Nagpur, where he bowled eight wicketless overs for 58 runs before Sri Lanka won by three wickets. He made his Test debut on 23 November 2010 against the West Indies in the second Test match played at the R. Premadasa Stadium, becoming the 114th Sri Lankan Test player.

By dismissing Chris Gayle of West Indies, Lakmal became the third bowler to take a wicket with the first ball bowled in a Test match at a new venue, joining Kapil Dev of India and Imran Khan of Pakistan, which was held at Pallekele International Cricket Stadium. Lakmal soon became the mainstay in the national side ever since the retirement of Chaminda Vaas and he cemented his position on the back of impressive performances at domestic level.

He made his T20I debut against England on 25 June 2011 and he dismissed Michael Lumb on his opening over to claim his first T20I wicket.

His bowling average stood at 65.75 when he was two-and-a-half-years into his Test career.

He had his first breakthrough test series against Pakistan in the United Arab Emirates where he ended up taking 12 wickets on the pitches which didn't quite suit well for the seamers to cash in. His bowling average slightly improved after picking a total of 19 wickets against Pakistan and Bangladesh at the start of 2014. He was one of the members of the 2014 ICC World Twenty20 triumph although he didn't play in any of the matches. He was fined 30 percent of his match fees for bowling two successive beamers at Jos Buttler during the 50th over of the group stage match between Sri Lanka and England at the 2015 Cricket World Cup which also caused match referee David Boon to interrupt and impose sanctions on him calling it as dangerous and unfair bowling.

Lakmal is also the first cricketer from Hambantota District to represent the national cricket team of Sri Lanka.

=== Become strike bowler in team ===
During first Test against South Africa, Lakmal bagged his maiden five-wicket haul, becoming the second Sri Lankan pacer Chanaka Welagedara to take a fifer against South Africa in South Africa. However, Sri Lanka lost the match by 206 runs. Though Sri Lanka lost all three Test matches, Lakmal showed best bowling figures throughout the series. He is the highest wicket-taker for Sri Lanka in the series with 12 wickets at an average of 30.83. He insisted that the test tour of South Africa in 2016-17 was his first real success in test cricket and also revealed that he had himself feared for test cricket prior to the test tour of South Africa in 2016–17.

He was also part of the Sri Lankan team at the 2017 ICC Champions Trophy.

He ran through Indian batting lineup in the first test match at Kolkata in November 2017, where he delivered a dramatic spell of 4/26 in India's first innings. At one point, he recorded 3/0 in a six over spell with all six overs being maiden overs which initially reduced India to 17/3 in a rain marred contest. He felt discomfort on the field during the test match at Delhi due to the air pollution and also vomited in the field during India's first innings.

On 10 December 2017, in the first ODI against India, Lakmal used swinging and seaming bowling performance to rip through Indian batting line-up to restrict them to 112, which was India's third-lowest in ODIs at home and their lowest at home when batting first. He played the role as a destructive bowler spearheading the bowling attack leading from the front as his lethal bowling spell of 4/13 in ten overs also included four maiden overs leaving Indian batting lineup in ttatters.

At one stage, India were seven down for just 29 runs, until MS Dhoni scored his fifty to reach total over hundred. Lakmal finished his bowling spell with four wickets for 13 runs, which is best bowling figures in ODIs up to date. Sri Lanka reached the mark in twentieth over and won the match by 7 wickets. This win gave Lankans their first win after 12 consecutive ODI losses in 2017. Lakmal adjudged man of the match for his match winning bowling performance. His particular bowling performance was also shortlisted by Cricinfo as one of the nominees for best bowling performances in ODI cricket in 2017.

During the Bangladesh Tri-series, Lakmal played as the spearhead of Sri Lanka bowling line-up where his counterparts always struggled with injuries. On 25 January 2018 against Bangladesh, Lakmal delivered a match winning bowling performance to dismantle Bangladesh to 82 runs, which is their second lowest against Sri Lanka in all ODIs. Sri Lanka won the match by 10 wickets and Lakmal has awarded man of the match. With that win, Sri Lanka reached the final of the tri-series as well.

In 2018, he was appointed as the vice-captain of the Sri Lankan outfit for home test series against Bangladesh.

On 8 February 2018, during second Test against Bangladesh, Lakmal took his 100th Test wicket by dismissing Tamim Iqbal caught by himself. He became the fourth Sri Lankan fast bowler to achieve the feat after Chaminda Vaas, Lasith Malinga and Dilhara Fernando. Lakmal is currently the fourth highest Test wicket taker for Sri Lanka.

Few of his notable finest performances in white ball cricket came against South Africa where he was given the responsibility to defend seven runs off the last over during the third ODI of the series in August 2018 which he delivered up to perfection helping Sri Lanka to win the nail biter by a narrow margin of three runs (D/L) in a rain affected game.

His spell of 3/46 also propelled Sri Lanka to end its 11 match losing streak against South Africa in ODIs.

He was mostly inconsistent in test cricket up until the end of 2017 averaging 44.94 after 42 test match appearances. However, he turned his fortunes in test cricket enjoying a peak run of form in test matches from 2018 to 2021 having captured 72 wickets at an average of 24.73, during a period where he established himself as the leader of the pace battery of Sri Lanka especially as a senior bowler in the side.

=== Captaincy ===
In May 2018, he was one of 33 cricketers to be awarded a national contract by Sri Lanka Cricket ahead of the 2018–19 season.

The following month, he was named the captain of Sri Lanka's Test side, for the third and final match against the West Indies, after Dinesh Chandimal was handed a one-match ban for ball tampering.

He became the 16th player to captain Sri Lanka in a Test match. Sri Lanka won the match and became the first Asian team to win a Test match at Kensington Oval.

He became the first Sri Lankan captain to take a wicket in his opening over of a test match when he dismissed Devon Smith in very first over and also the first captain since 2002 to do so in test cricket after Waqar Younis. He also became the first bowling captain to deliver the first over of a test match since 2004 after Heath Streak.

On 11 July 2018, ICC concluded its hearing on the ball tampering issue and violence of code of conduct by regular captain Dinesh Chandimal, who had pleaded guilty to a level three spirit of cricket offence. Chandimal, coach and team manager's hearing took place before the start of the first Test against South Africa, with them found guilty. Chandimal received a two-match ban, with Lakmal captaining the side in his place. Under his captaincy, Sri Lanka won the first match by 278 runs, and ended the match within three days. Sri Lanka comprehensively won the second Test and won the series 2-0 under Lakmal's captaincy.

=== Post captaincy ===
On 1 August 2018, Lakmal took his 100th ODI wicket by dismissing David Miller during the second ODI against South Africa. He became the 10th Sri Lankan fast bowler to achieve the milestone.

On 8 August 2018, Lakmal defended seven runs off the final over to cap off Sri Lanka to end an 11-match losing streak against South Africa. Sri Lankan batsmen scored 300+ runs in rain affected 39-over match. South Africa's target was reduced to 191 runs off 21 overs, where they required 69 runs off the last 10 overs with seven wickets in hand. Sri Lanka finally won the match by 3 runs in D/L method.

During first test at Gabba against Australia, Lakmal took his third five-wicket haul. He finished with 5 for 75, though Sri Lanka lost the match by an innings margin. However, he suffering from a stiff back during the practices ahead of second Test and did not play the match.

In April 2019, he was named in Sri Lanka's squad for the 2019 Cricket World Cup. He had a fair World Cup campaign and Sri Lanka finished the tournament as sixth in the table.

In December 2019, Lakmal was ruled out of the team due to dengue fever.

Therefore, he was unable to travel with the Test team to Pakistan for two-match series. In January 2020, Lakmal was recalled into the test squad for the series against Zimbabwe. He was the spearhead of the Sri Lankan attack, where he took 3 for 53 in first innings and then 4 for 27 in the second innings. Finally Sri Lanka won the match by 10 wickets.

During the second test against the West Indies in March 2021, he started the proceedings with six straight maiden overs including two wickets in a flat pitch.

He ended the series as the leading wicket taker with 11 scalps and also bagged the player of the series award for his bowling display.

He played a crucial role in being an integral part of Sri Lanka's campaign during the inaugural ICC World Test Championship where he ended up as the second highest wicket taker for Sri Lanka with 20 scalps.

In March 2021, Wisden quoted Lakmal as the most improved test bowler in the planet especially highlighting how he made significant transformation in test cricket after his slow tough start to his test career. He drew wide attention in test cricket from 2018 where he was deemed to be a better bowler than before due to the fact that his bowling average in away soil was just around 22.30 since the start of 2018 to March 2021.
