= Australian cricket team in 2016–17 =

This article contains information, results and statistics regarding the Australian national cricket team in the 2016 and 2016–17 cricket seasons. Statisticians class the 2016–17 season as matches played between May 2016 and April 2017.

== Player contracts ==
The 2016 - 17 list, or roster, was announced on 1 April 2016. Note that uncontracted players are still available to be selected to play for the national cricket team.

| Player | Age as at 1 April 2016 | State | Test cap | ODI cap | T20I cap | ODI/T20I shirt |
|---|---|---|---|---|---|---|
| Steve Smith (captain) | 26 years, 9 months | NSW | 415 | 182 | 43 | 49 |
| David Warner (vice captain) | 29 years, 5 months | NSW | 426 | 170 | 32 | 31 |
| George Bailey | 33 years, 6 months | TAS | 436 | 195 | 55 | 2 |
| Joe Burns | 26 years, 6 months | QLD | 441 | 207 | – | 62 |
| Nathan Coulter-Nile | 28 years, 5 months | WA | – | 204 | 61 | 6 |
| Pat Cummins | 22 years, 10 months | NSW | 423 | 189 | 51 | 30 |
| James Faulkner | 25 years, 11 months | TAS | 435 | 202 | 57 | 44 |
| Aaron Finch | 29 years, 4 months | VIC | – | 197 | 49 | 5 |
| John Hastings | 30 years, 4 months | VIC | 430 | 184 | 47 | 41 |
| Josh Hazlewood | 25 years, 2 months | NSW | 440 | 183 | 62 | 38 |
| Usman Khawaja | 29 years, 3 months | QLD | 419 | 199 | 80 | 1 |
| Nathan Lyon | 28 years, 4 months | NSW | 421 | 194 | 77 | 67 |
| Mitchell Marsh | 24 years, 5 months | WA | 438 | 190 | 54 | 8 |
| Shaun Marsh | 32 years, 8 months | WA | 422 | 165 | 30 | 9 |
| Glenn Maxwell | 27 years, 5 months | VIC | 434 | 196 | 58 | 32 |
| Peter Nevill | 30 years, 5 months | NSW | 443 | – | 81 | 20 |
| James Pattinson | 25 years, 10 months | VIC | 424 | 188 | 52 | 19 |
| Adam Voges | 36 years, 5 months | WA | 442 | 163 | 28 | 24 |
| Peter Siddle | 31 years, 4 months | VIC | 403 | 172 | 35 | 10 |
| Mitchell Starc | 26 years, 2 months | NSW | 425 | 185 | 59 | 56 |

== Match summary ==
| Format | P | W | L | D | T | NR |
|---|---|---|---|---|---|---|
| Tests | 13 | 5 | 7 | 1 | 0 | 0 |
| One Day Internationals | 25 | 12 | 12 | 0 | 0 | 1 |
| Twenty20 Internationals | 5 | 3 | 2 | 0 | 0 | 0 |
| Total | 43 | 20 | 21 | 1 | 0 | 1 |

== 2016 season ==
=== ODI Tri-Series in West Indies ===
==== 2nd ODI ====
5 June
13:00 (D/N)
Scorecard

| West Indies; 116 (32.3 overs) | v | Australia; 117/4 (25.4 overs) |
| Johnson Charles 22 (40); Adam Zampa 3/16 (5.3 overs) | | David Warner 55* (55); Sunil Narine 2/36 (10 overs) |

Australia won by 6 wickets
Providence Stadium, Providence, Guyana
Umpires: Gregory Brathwaite (WI) and Nigel Llong (Eng)
Player of the match: Nathan Lyon (Aus)

- Australia won the toss and elected to field.
- The start of the match was delayed by 10 minutes due to a wet outfield with no overs lost from play.
- Points: Australia 5, West Indies 0.

==== 3rd ODI ====
7 June
13:00 (D/N)
Scorecard

| South Africa; 189/9 (50 overs) | v | Australia; 142 (34.2 overs) |
| Farhaan Behardien 62 (82); Glenn Maxwell 2/15 (3 overs) | | Aaron Finch 72 (103); Kagiso Rabada 3/13 (7 overs) |

South Africa won by 47 runs
Providence Stadium, Providence, Guyana
Umpires: Richard Illingworth (Eng) and Joel Wilson (WI)
Player of the match: Farhaan Behardien (SA)

- South Africa won the toss and elected to bat.
- Rain stopped play for 20 minutes during the Australian innings with no overs lost from play.
- Tabraiz Shamsi (SA) made his ODI debut. * Points: South Africa 5, Australia 0.

==== 4th ODI ====
11 June
13:00 (D/N)
Scorecard

| Australia; 288/6 (50 overs) | v | South Africa; 252 (47.4 overs) |
| David Warner 109 (120); Imran Tahir 2/45 (9 overs) | | Faf du Plessis 63 (76); Mitchell Starc 3/43 (10 overs) |

Australia won by 36 runs
Warner Park, Basseterre, St. Kitts
Umpires: Nigel Llong (Eng) and Joel Wilson (WI)
Player of the match: David Warner (Aus)

- Australia won the toss and elected to bat.
- Faf du Plessis (SA) passed 3,000 ODI runs. * Points: Australia 4, South Africa 0.

==== 5th ODI ====
13 June
13:00 (D/N)
Scorecard

| Australia; 265/7 (50 overs) | v | West Indies; 266/6 (45.4 overs) |
| Usman Khawaja 98 (123); Kieron Pollard 2/32 (6 overs) | | Marlon Samuels 92 (87); Adam Zampa 2/60 (7 overs) |

West Indies won by 4 wickets
Warner Park, Basseterre, St. Kitts
Umpires: Gregory Brathwaite (WI) and Richard Illingworth (Eng)
Player of the match: Marlon Samuels (WI)

- West Indies won the toss and elected to field.
- Travis Head (Aus) made his ODI debut. * Marlon Samuels (WI) made his highest score in ODIs against Australia. He went on to better this record with a score of 125 during the 8th ODI of this series. * Points: West Indies 4, Australia 0.

==== 7th ODI ====
19 June
13:00 (D/N)
Scorecard

| South Africa; 8/0 (1 over) | v | Australia |
| Quinton de Kock 5* (5) |

No result
Kensington Oval, Bridgetown, Barbados
Umpires: Kumar Dharmasena (SL) and Joel Wilson (WI)

- Australia won the toss and elected to field.
- Rain stopped play after the 1st over of the South African innings and the match was finally called off at 18:25 with no further play possible.
- AB de Villiers played in his 200th ODI match for South Africa. He has also played five ODIs for Africa XI. * Points: Australia 2, South Africa 2.

==== 8th ODI ====
21 June
13:00 (D/N)
Scorecard

| West Indies; 282/8 (50 overs) | v | Australia; 283/4 (48.4 overs) |
| Marlon Samuels 125 (134); Mitchell Starc 3/51 (10 overs) | | Mitchell Marsh 79* (85); Shannon Gabriel 1/43 (9 overs) |

Australia won by 6 wickets
Kensington Oval, Bridgetown, Barbados
Umpires: Gregory Brathwaite (WI) and Richard Kettleborough (Eng)
Player of the match: Marlon Samuels (WI)

- Australia won the toss and elected to field.
- Shannon Gabriel (WI) made his ODI debut. * Denesh Ramdin (WI) passed 2,000 ODI runs. * Marlon Samuels (WI) made his highest score in ODIs against Australia, bettering his score of 92 during the 5th ODI of this series. * Australia qualified for the final as a result of this match. * Points: Australia 4, West Indies 0.

==== Final ====
26 June
13:00 (D/N)
Scorecard

| Australia; 270/9 (50 overs) | v | West Indies; 212 (45.4 overs) |
| Matthew Wade 57* (52); Jason Holder 2/51 (10 overs) | | Johnson Charles 45 (61); Josh Hazlewood 5/50 (9.4 overs) |

Australia won by 58 runs
Kensington Oval, Bridgetown, Barbados
Umpires: Richard Kettleborough (Eng) and Joel Wilson (WI)
Player of the match: Mitchell Marsh (Aus)

- Australia won the toss and elected to bat.
- Mitchell Marsh (Aus) passed 1,000 ODI runs. * Australia won the 2016 West Indies Tri-Series.

=== Tour of Sri Lanka ===
==== 1st Test ====
26–30 July 2016
Scorecard

| Sri Lanka | v | Australia |
| 117 (34.2 overs); Dhananjaya de Silva 24 (38); Nathan Lyon 3/12 (3 overs) | | 203 (79.2 overs); Adam Voges 47 (115); Rangana Herath 4/49 (25 overs) |
| 353 (93.4 overs); Kusal Mendis 176 (254); Mitchell Starc 4/84 (19 overs) | | 161 (88.3 overs); Steve Smith 55 (125); Rangana Herath 5/54 (33.3 overs) |

Sri Lanka won by 106 runs
Pallekele International Cricket Stadium, Kandy
Umpires: Richard Kettleborough (Eng) and Sundaram Ravi (Ind)
Player of the match: Kusal Mendis (SL)

- Sri Lanka won the toss and elected to bat.
- Rain stopped play after tea on Day 1, with play being abandoned for the day. *Rain stopped play before tea on Day 2, with play being abandoned for the day. *Bad light and rain stopped play after tea on Day 3, with play being abandoned for the day. *Bad light stopped play on Day 4 and tea was taken, with play being abandoned for the day. *Rain delayed the start of play by an hour on Day 4 and Day 5.
- Dhananjaya de Silva and Lakshan Sandakan (both SL) made their Test debuts. *Sri Lanka's first innings was their shortest innings in Tests after electing to bat. *Dhananjaya de Silva became the first player for Sri Lanka to get off the mark in a Test match by scoring a six. *Kusal Mendis became the youngest player for Sri Lanka to score a Test century against Australia. *Nathan Lyon (Aus) took his 200th Test wicket. *Lakshan Sandakan's (SL) match figures of 7/107 are the best by a slow left-arm wrist-spin on Test debut. *While attempting to bat time for a draw on the fifth day, the ninth and tenth-wicket partnerships featuring Steve O'Keefe, Peter Nevill and Josh Hazlewood (Aus) faced a Test cricket record 25.4 consecutive overs without scoring a run. *This was only Sri Lanka's second win against Australia in twenty-seven Tests. *Steve Smith suffered his first Test loss as captain of Australia.

==== 2nd Test ====
4–8 August 2016
Scorecard

| Sri Lanka | v | Australia |
| 281 (73.1 overs); Kusal Mendis 86 (137); Mitchell Starc 5/44 (16.1 overs) | | 106 (33.2 overs); David Warner 42 (41); Dilruwan Perera 4/29 (15 overs) |
| 237 (59.3 overs); Dilruwan Perera 64 (89); Mitchell Starc 6/50 (12.3 overs) | | 183 (50.1 overs); David Warner 41 (31); Dilruwan Perera 6/70 (23 overs) |

Sri Lanka won by 229 runs
Galle International Stadium, Galle
Umpires: Chris Gaffaney (NZ) and Richard Kettleborough (Eng)
Player of the match: Dilruwan Perera (SL)

- Sri Lanka won the toss and elected to bat.
- Vishwa Fernando (SL) and Jon Holland (Aus) made their Test debuts. *This was Sri Lanka's 250th Test match. *Mitchell Starc (Aus) took his 100th Test wicket and also became the 26th player to take a wicket with the first ball in a Test match. *Australia's first innings total of 106 is their lowest score against Sri Lanka in Tests. *Rangana Herath became the first Sri Lankan spinner, the second Sri Lankan, and the oldest to take a hat-trick in a Test. *Mitchell Starc took the best match figures by an Australian pace bowler in Tests in Sri Lanka. *Dilruwan Perera became the first Sri Lankan to take ten wickets and score a half-century in the same Test. *Dilruwan Perera became the fastest Sri Lankan bowler to take 50 wickets, with this being his eleventh Test. *With this win, it was Sri Lanka's first series victory against Australia since 1999. *This was Australia's eighth straight loss in Tests in Asia.

==== 3rd Test ====
13–17 August 2016
Scorecard

| Sri Lanka | v | Australia |
| 355 (141.1 overs); Dinesh Chandimal 132 (356); Mitchell Starc 5/63 (25.1 overs) | | 379 (125.1 overs); Shaun Marsh 130 (281); Rangana Herath 6/81 (38.1 overs) |
| 347/8d (99.3 overs); Kaushal Silva 115 (269); Nathan Lyon 4/123 (37 overs) | | 160 (44.1 overs); David Warner 68 (94); Rangana Herath 7/64 (18.1 overs) |

Sri Lanka won by 163 runs
Sinhalese Sports Club Ground, Colombo
Umpires: Chris Gaffaney (NZ) and Sundaram Ravi (Ind)
Player of the match: Rangana Herath (SL)

- Sri Lanka won the toss and elected to bat.
- Dhananjaya de Silva (SL) scored his maiden Test century. *Mitchell Starc (Aus) became the first fast bowler to take three five-wicket hauls in a Test series in Sri Lanka and he also took his third consecutive five-wicket haul. *Steve Smith (Aus) became youngest Australian to score 4,000 Test runs. *Rangana Herath (SL) took the best match figures for a Sri Lankan bowler against Australia. *Rangana Herath (SL) took his eighth five-wicket haul in the fourth innings of a Test, the most for any bowler. *This was Sri Lanka's first series whitewash against Australia in Tests.

==== 1st ODI ====
21 August 2016
14:30 (D/N)
Scorecard

| Sri Lanka; 227/8 (50 overs) | v | Australia; 228/7 (46.5 overs) |
| Dinesh Chandimal 80* (118); James Faulkner 4/38 (10 overs) | | Steve Smith 58 (92); Dilruwan Perera 3/48 (10 overs) |

Australia won by 3 wickets
R Premadasa Stadium, Colombo
Umpires: Aleem Dar (Pak) and Ranmore Martinesz (SL)
Player of the match: James Faulkner (Aus)

- Australia won the toss and elected to field.
- Amila Aponso and Lakshan Sandakan (SL) both made their ODI debuts.
- Mitchell Starc (Aus) became the fastest player to take 100 wickets in ODIs.

==== 2nd ODI ====
24 August 2016
14:30 (D/N)
Scorecard

| Sri Lanka; 288 (48.5 overs) | v | Australia; 206 (47.2 overs) |
| Kusal Mendis 69 (69); Adam Zampa 3/42 (10 overs) | | Matthew Wade 76 (88); Amila Aponso 4/18 (9.2 overs) |

Sri Lanka won by 82 runs
R Premadasa Stadium, Colombo
Umpires: Michael Gough (Eng) and Raveendra Wimalasiri (SL)
Player of the match: Angelo Mathews (SL)

- Sri Lankan won the toss and elected to bat.
- James Faulkner (Aus) took a hat-trick. *Angelo Mathews (SL) took his 50th ODI wicket in Sri Lanka. *This was Sri Lanka's biggest win in terms of runs against Australia in an ODI.

==== 3rd ODI ====
28 August 2016
14:30 (D/N)
Scorecard

| Sri Lanka; 226 (49.2 overs) | v | Australia; 227/8 (46 overs) |
| Dinesh Chandimal 102 (130); Adam Zampa 3/38 (10 overs) | | George Bailey 70 (99); Angelo Mathews 2/30 (7 overs) |

Australia won by 2 wickets
Rangiri Dambulla International Stadium, Dambulla
Umpires: Aleem Dar (Pak) and Ranmore Martinesz (SL)
Player of the match: George Bailey (Aus)

- Sri Lanka won the toss and elected to bat.
- This was the first day-night ODI to be hosted in Dambulla in six years. *This was Tillakaratne Dilshan's (SL) final ODI appearance. *Dinesh Chandimal (SL) scored his first ODI century in Sri Lanka. *This was the highest successful run chase against Sri Lanka at Dambulla in an ODI. *This was also Australian's narrowest win in terms of wickets against Sri Lanka in an ODI.

==== 4th ODI ====
31 August 2016
14:30 (D/N)
Scorecard

| Sri Lanka; 212 (50 overs) | v | Australia; 217/4 (31 overs) |
| Dhananjaya de Silva 76 (87); John Hastings 6/45 (10 overs) | | George Bailey 90* (85); Sachith Pathirana 3/37 (8 overs) |

Australia won by 6 wickets
Rangiri Dambulla International Stadium, Dambulla
Umpires: Michael Gough (Eng) and Ruchira Palliyaguruge (SL)
Player of the match: John Hastings (Aus)

- Sri Lanka won the toss and elected to bat.
- Avishka Fernando (SL) made his ODI debut. *John Hastings (Aus) took his first five-wicket haul in an ODI. *Aaron Finch equalled the record for the fastest fifty by an Australian batsman in an ODI.

==== 5th ODI ====
4 September 2016
14:30 (D/N)
Scorecard

| Sri Lanka; 195 (40.2 overs) | v | Australia; 199/5 (43 overs) |
| Danushka Gunathilaka 39 (40); Mitchell Starc 3/40 (9 overs) | | David Warner 106 (126); Dilruwan Perera 3/51 (10 overs) |

Australia won by 5 wickets
Pallekele International Cricket Stadium, Kandy
Umpires: Aleem Dar (Pak) and Ruchira Palliyaguruge (SL)
Player of the match: David Warner (Aus)

- Sri Lanka won the toss and elected to bat.
- David Warner scored the first century by an Australian batsmen in Sri Lanka in an ODI.

==== 1st T20I ====
6 September 2016
19:00 (D/N)
Scorecard

| Australia; 263/3 (20 overs) | v | Sri Lanka; 178/9 (20 overs) |
| Glenn Maxwell 145* (65); Sachith Pathirana 1/45 (4 overs) | | Dinesh Chandimal 58 (43); Scott Boland 3/26 (4 overs); Mitchell Starc 3/26 (4 overs) |

Australia won by 85 runs
Pallekele International Cricket Stadium, Kandy
Umpires: Ranmore Martinesz (SL) and Raveendra Wimalasiri (SL)
Player of the match: Glenn Maxwell (Aus)

- Sri Lanka won the toss and elected to field.
- Sachith Pathirana (SL) made his T20I debut. *Australia scored the highest total in a T20I, beating the previous highest of 260/6 set by Sri Lanka in 2007. *Glenn Maxwell (Aus) scored his maiden T20I century. *Glenn Maxwell (Aus) became the first to hit a century in his maiden innings as an opener in a T20I. *This was Sri Lanka's biggest defeat in a T20I.

==== 2nd T20I ====
9 September 2016
19:00 (D/N)
Scorecard

| Sri Lanka; 128/9 (20 overs) | v | Australia; 130/6 (17.5 overs) |
| Dhananjaya de Silva 62 (50); Adam Zampa 3/16 (4 overs) | | Glenn Maxwell 66 (29); Tillakaratne Dilshan 2/8 (2 overs) |

Australia won by 4 wickets
R Premadasa Stadium, Colombo
Umpires: Ranmore Martinesz (SL) and Ruchira Palliyaguruge (SL)
Player of the match: Glenn Maxwell (Aus)

- Sri Lanka won the toss and elected to bat.
- This was Tillakaratne Dilshan's (SL) final international match. * Glenn Maxwell scored the equal fastest fifty in T20I cricket by an Australian (18 balls).

== 2016–17 season ==
=== ODI Series in South Africa ===
==== 1st ODI ====
30 September 2016 (D/N)
Scorecard

| Australia; 294/9 (50 overs) | v | South Africa; 295/4 (36.2 overs) |
| George Bailey 74 (90); Andile Phehlukwayo 4/44 (10 overs) | | Quinton de Kock 178 (113); Scott Boland 3/67 (7 overs) |

South Africa won by 6 wickets
SuperSport Park, Centurion
Umpires: Bongani Jele (SA) and Joel Wilson (WI)
Player of the match: Quinton de Kock (SA)

- South Africa won the toss and elected to field.
- Quinton de Kock (SA) made his highest score in an ODI and the highest score by any player in an ODI in South Africa.

==== 2nd ODI ====
2 October 2016
Scorecard

| South Africa; 361/6 (50 overs) | v | Australia; 219 (37.4 overs) |
| Faf du Plessis 111 (93); John Hastings 3/57 (10 overs) | | Travis Head 51 (45); Wayne Parnell 3/40 (7 overs) |

South Africa won by 142 runs
Wanderers Stadium, Johannesburg
Umpires: Shaun George (SA) and Nigel Llong (Eng)
Player of the match: Faf du Plessis (SA)

- Australia won the toss and elected to field.
- Joe Mennie and Chris Tremain (Aus) both made their ODI debuts.

==== 3rd ODI ====
5 October 2016 (D/N)
Scorecard

| Australia; 371/6 (50 overs) | v | South Africa; 372/6 (49.2 overs) |
| David Warner 117 (107); Imran Tahir 2/54 (10 overs) | | David Miller 118* (79); John Hastings 2/79 (10 overs) |

South Africa won by 4 wickets
Kingsmead Cricket Ground, Durban
Umpires: Adrian Holdstock (SA) and Joel Wilson (WI)
Player of the match: David Miller (SA)

- Australia won the toss and elected to bat.
- This was the second-highest successful run chase in ODIs.

==== 4th ODI ====
9 October 2016
Scorecard

| Australia; 167 (36.4 overs) | v | South Africa; 168/4 (35.3 overs) |
| Matthew Wade 52 (58); Kyle Abbott 4/40 (8 overs) | | Faf du Plessis 69 (87); Chris Tremain 2/48 (10 overs) |

South Africa won by 6 wickets
St. George's Park, Port Elizabeth
Umpires: Adrian Holdstock (SA) and Nigel Llong (Eng)
Player of the match: Kyle Abbott (SA)

- Australia won the toss and elected to bat.

==== 5th ODI ====
12 October 2016 (D/N)
Scorecard

| South Africa; 327/8 (50 overs) | v | Australia; 296 (48.2 overs) |
| Rilee Rossouw 122 (118); Joe Mennie 3/49 (10 overs) | | David Warner 173 (136); Imran Tahir 2/42 (10 overs) |

South Africa won by 31 runs
Newlands Cricket Ground, Cape Town
Umpires: Shaun George (SA) and Joel Wilson (WI)
Player of the match: David Warner (Aus)

- South Africa won the toss and elected to bat.
- David Warner made the highest total for an Australian batsman against South Africa in an ODI.

=== South Africa Test Series in Australia ===
==== 1st Test ====
3–7 November 2016
Scorecard

| South Africa | v | Australia |
| 242 (63.4 overs); Quinton de Kock 84 (101); Mitchell Starc 4/71 (18.4 overs) | | 244 (70.2 overs); David Warner 97 (100); Vernon Philander 4/56 (19.2 overs) |
| 8/540d (160.1 overs); JP Duminy 141 (225); Peter Siddle 2/62 (26 overs) | | 361 (119.1 overs); Usman Khawaja 97 (182); Kagiso Rabada 5/92 (31 overs) |

South Africa won by 177 runs
WACA Ground, Perth
Umpires: Aleem Dar (Pak) and Nigel Llong (Eng)
Player of the match: Kagiso Rabada (SA)

- South Africa won the toss and elected to bat.
- Keshav Maharaj (SA) made his Test debut. *Australia's collapse of 10/86 was their worst collapse after having an opening stand of 150 or more, and third worst by any team in Tests. *Dean Elgar and Jean-Paul Duminy's partnership of 250 is South Africa's highest partnership in Perth, the third highest overall in Perth, and their second highest against Australia. *This was Australia's first loss in the opening Test of the home series since 1988. *It was also Australia's first Test match loss at home since they lost in Perth against South Africa in 2012.

==== 2nd Test ====
12–16 November 2016
Scorecard

| Australia | v | South Africa |
| 85 (32.5 overs); Steve Smith 48* (80); Vernon Philander 5/21 (10.1 overs) | | 326 (100.5 overs); Quinton de Kock 104 (143); Josh Hazlewood 6/89 (30.5 overs) |
| 161 (60.1 overs); Usman Khawaja 64 (121); Kyle Abbott 6/77 (23.1 overs) |

South Africa won by an innings and 80 runs
Bellerive Oval, Hobart
Umpires: Aleem Dar (Pak) and Richard Kettleborough (Eng)
Player of the match: Kyle Abbott (SA)

- South Africa won the toss and elected to field.
- No play was possible on day 2 due to rain.
- Callum Ferguson and Joe Mennie (Aus) both made their Test debuts. *Australia's first innings total is their lowest at home for 32 years and their second-shortest innings at home in terms of balls faced. *This was South Africa's third consecutive Test series win in Australia. *This was South Africa's first win against Australia by an innings in Australia.

==== 3rd Test ====
24–28 November 2016 (D/N)
Scorecard

| South Africa | v | Australia |
| 9/259d (76 overs); Faf du Plessis 118* (164); Josh Hazlewood 4/68 (22 overs) | | 383 (121.1 overs); Usman Khawaja 145 (308); Kyle Abbott 3/49 (29 overs) |
| 250 (85.2 overs); Stephen Cook 104 (240); Mitchell Starc 4/80 (23.2 overs) | | 3/127 (40.5 overs); David Warner 47 (51); Kyle Abbott 1/26 (10 overs) |

Australia won by 7 wickets
Adelaide Oval, Adelaide
Umpires: Richard Kettleborough (Eng) and Nigel Llong (Eng)
Player of the match: Usman Khawaja (Aus)

- South Africa won the toss and elected to bat.
- This was the third day/night Test match. *Peter Handscomb, Nic Maddinson, Matt Renshaw (Aus); and Tabraiz Shamsi (SA) all made their Test debuts. *Faf du Plessis became the first player for South Africa to score a century in a day/night Test match. *Usman Khawaja became the first player for Australia to score a century in a day/night Test match.

=== Pakistan tour in Australia ===
==== 1st Test ====
15–19 December 2016 (D/N)
Scorecard

| Australia | v | Pakistan |
| 429 (130.1 overs); Steve Smith 130 (222); Wahab Riaz 4/89 (26 overs) | | 142 (55 overs); Sarfraz Ahmed 59* (64); Josh Hazlewood 3/22 (14 overs) |
| 5/202d (39 overs); Usman Khawaja 74 (109); Rahat Ali 2/40 (10 overs) | | 450 (145 overs); Asad Shafiq 137 (207); Mitchell Starc 4/119 (39 overs) |

Australia won by 39 runs
The Gabba, Brisbane
Umpires: Ian Gould (Eng) and Richard Illingworth (Eng)
Player of the match: Asad Shafiq (Pak)

- Australia won the toss and elected to bat.
- Peter Handscomb (Aus) scored his first century in Tests. *Pakistan's 450 is their highest ever fourth innings total, the highest fourth innings total set at the Gabba and the fourth highest set overall in Tests. *Asad Shafiq's (Pak) 137 is the highest individual score in the fourth innings of a Test at the Gabba. *Shafiq scored his ninth Test century batting at number six, the most by any player batting in that position.

==== 2nd Test ====
26–30 December 2016
Scorecard

| Pakistan | v | Australia |
| 9/443d (126.3 overs); Azhar Ali 205* (364); Josh Hazlewood 3/50 (32.3 overs) | | 8/624d (142 overs); Steve Smith 165* (246); Sohail Khan 3/131 (31 overs) |
| 163 (53.2 overs); Sarfraz Ahmed 43 (62); Mitchell Starc 4/36 (15.2 overs) |

Australia won by an innings and 18 runs
Melbourne Cricket Ground, Melbourne
Umpires: Ian Gould (Eng) and Sundaram Ravi (Ind)
Player of the match: Steve Smith (Aus)

- Pakistan won the toss and elected to bat.
- Tea was taken early on day 1, with no play in the final session due to rain. Lunch was taken early on day 2, with no play in the middle session due to rain. Further rain caused play to cease at 5:15 pm. Rain delayed the start of play on day 3 until 10:35 am. Tea was taken early on day 4, with no play in the final session due to rain.
- Azhar Ali (Pak) scored his 1,000th Test run in 2016. * Azhar Ali's first innings score of 205 not out is highest Test score by a Pakistani player in Australia and the second highest Test score by a visiting player at the Melbourne Cricket Ground. *The partnership of 118 runs between Ali and Sohail Khan (Pak) is the highest 8th wicket partnership against Australia. *Australia's first innings total of 624 is the highest Test innings score at the Melbourne Cricket Ground. *Josh Hazlewood (Aus) took his 100th Test wicket. *Steve Smith (Aus) scored his 1,000th Test run in 2016. *This was the first time Pakistan lost by an innings margin despite scoring 400+ runs in the first innings of the match.

==== 3rd Test ====
3–7 January 2017
Scorecard

| Australia | v | Pakistan |
| 8/538d (135 overs); Matt Renshaw 184 (293); Wahab Riaz 3/89 (28 overs) | | 315 (110.3 overs); Younis Khan 175* (334); Josh Hazlewood 4/55 (27.3 overs) |
| 2/241d (32 overs); Usman Khawaja 79* (98); Wahab Riaz 1/28 (7 overs) | | 244 (80.2 overs); Sarfraz Ahmed 72* (70); Josh Hazlewood 3/29 (18.2 overs) |

Australia won by 220 runs
Sydney Cricket Ground, Sydney
Umpires: Richard Illingworth (Eng) and Sundaram Ravi (Ind)
Player of the match: David Warner (Aus)

- Australia won the toss and elected to bat.
- Rain prevented play in the first sessions of days 3 and 4.
- Hilton Cartwright (Aus) and Sharjeel Khan (Pak) both made their Test debuts. *Steve Smith (Aus) played his 50th Test. *David Warner (Aus) became the fifth batsmen to score a century before lunch on the first day of a Test match and the first to do so in Australia. *David Warner's century off 78 balls is the fastest Test century at the Sydney Cricket Ground and the second fastest against Pakistan. *Sarfraz Ahmed (Pak) claimed his 100th Test dismissal as a wicket-keeper. *Matt Renshaw (Aus) scored his first Test century. *Younis Khan (Pak) became the first player to score a century in every nation that has hosted a Test match, including the United Arab Emirates. *David Warner's half century off 23 balls in the second innings is the fastest Test fifty by an Australian and the second fastest overall. *This was the fourth consecutive whitewash for Pakistan in Australia in Tests and their sixth consecutive defeat, making it their worst streak. *Jackson Bird (Aus) equalled the record of four catches in a Test as a substitute fielder.

==== 1st ODI ====
13 January 2017
13:20 (D/N)
Scorecard

| Australia; 9/268 (50 overs) | v | Pakistan; 176 (42.4 overs) |
| Matthew Wade 100* (100); Hasan Ali 3/65 (9 overs) | | Babar Azam 33 (46); James Faulkner 4/32 (7 overs) |

Australia won by 92 runs
The Gabba, Brisbane
Umpires: Mick Martell (Aus) and Chettithody Shamshuddin (Ind)
Player of the match: Matthew Wade (Aus)

- Australia won the toss and elected to bat.
- Chris Lynn and Billy Stanlake (Aus) both made their ODI debuts. *Matthew Wade (Aus) scored his maiden ODI century.

==== 2nd ODI ====
15 January 2017
14:20 (D/N)
Scorecard

| Australia; 220 (48.2 overs) | v | Pakistan; 4/221 (47.4 overs) |
| Steve Smith 60 (101); Mohammad Amir 3/47 (9.2 overs) | | Mohammad Hafeez 72 (104); James Faulkner 2/35 (9 overs) |

Pakistan won by 6 wickets
Melbourne Cricket Ground, Melbourne
Umpires: Chris Gaffaney (NZ) and Paul Wilson (Aus)
Player of the match: Mohammad Hafeez (Pak)

- Australia won the toss and elected to bat.
- Mohammad Hafeez (Pak) captained his first ODI match after Azhar Ali sustained a hamstring injury in the first ODI. *This was Pakistan's first victory in any format against Australia in Australia since January 2005 and ended their longest losing streak in ODIs against any host nation.

==== 3rd ODI ====
19 January 2017
11:20 (D/N)
Scorecard

| Pakistan; 7/263 (50 overs) | v | Australia; 3/265 (45 overs) |
| Babar Azam 84 (100); Josh Hazlewood 3/32 (10 overs) | | Steve Smith 108* (104); Mohammad Amir 1/36 (10 overs) |

Australia won by 7 wickets
WACA Ground, Perth
Umpires: Simon Fry (Aus) and Chettithody Shamshuddin (Ind)
Player of the match: Steve Smith (Aus)

- Australia won the toss and elected to field.
- Peter Handscomb (Aus) made his ODI debut. *Billy Stanlake (Aus) took his maiden ODI wicket. *Babar Azam (Pak) became the joint-fastest player to score 1,000 runs in ODIs and the fastest for Pakistan in his 21st innings. *Steve Smith (Aus) scored his 3,000th ODI run, becoming the quickest Australian to reach the milestone in his 79th innings.

==== 4th ODI ====
22 January 2017
14:20 (D/N)
Scorecard

| Australia; 6/353 (50 overs) | v | Pakistan; 267 (43.5 overs) |
| David Warner 130 (119); Hasan Ali 5/54 (10 overs) | | Sharjeel Khan 74 (47); Josh Hazlewood 3/54 (8.5 overs) |

Australia won by 86 runs
Sydney Cricket Ground, Sydney
Umpires: Chris Gaffaney (NZ) and Mick Martell (Aus)
Player of the match: David Warner (Aus)

- Australia won the toss and elected to bat.

==== 5th ODI ====
26 January 2017
13:50 (D/N)
Scorecard

| Australia; 7/369 (50 overs) | v | Pakistan; 312 (49.1 overs) |
| David Warner 179 (128); Junaid Khan 2/61 (10 overs) | | Babar Azam 100 (109); Mitchell Starc 4/42 (9.1 overs) |

Australia won by 57 runs
Adelaide Oval, Adelaide
Umpires: Simon Fry (Aus) and Chettithody Shamshuddin (Ind)
Player of the match: David Warner (Aus)

- Australia won the toss and elected to bat.
- Travis Head (Aus) scored his maiden ODI century. *David Warner's (Aus) 179 was his highest ODI score and he equaled the record for the most 150s in ODIs (5). *Travis Head and David Warner's opening wicket partnership of 284 runs was the second highest opening stand and Australia's highest for any wicket in ODIs.

=== ODI Series in New Zealand ===
==== 1st ODI ====
30 January 2017
11:00
Scorecard

| New Zealand; 286/9 (50 overs) | v | Australia; 280 (47 overs) |
| Neil Broom 73 (75); Marcus Stoinis 3/49 (10 overs) | | Marcus Stoinis 146* (117); Mitchell Santner 3/44 (10 overs) |

New Zealand won by 6 runs
Eden Park, Auckland
Umpires: Wayne Knights (NZ) and Ruchira Palliyaguruge (SL)
Player of the match: Marcus Stoinis (Aus)

- Australia won the toss and elected to field.
- Sam Heazlett (Aus) made his ODI debut. *Aaron Finch (Aus) captained his first ODI match after Matthew Wade was ruled out due to back complaint. *Marcus Stoinis (Aus) took his maiden wicket and scored his maiden century in ODIs. He also became the first Australian to score a century and take three wickets in an ODI match. *Stoinis' score of 146 not out is the highest by an Australian batting at number seven and the second highest overall. His innings consisted of 11 sixes, the second highest by an Australian batsmen and the highest by an batsmen in a losing side. *Pat Cummins (Aus) took his 50th wicket in ODIs. *Josh Hazlewood (Aus) became the first player to be dismissed for a diamond duck in a partnership of more than fifty runs. This was Hazlewood's first dismissal, setting the record for the matches played without being dismissed (33). *Tom Latham (NZ) equalled New Zealand's record of 5 dismissals as a wicket keeper in an ODI innings (record shared with Gareth Hopkins, Brendon McCullum and Adam Parore).

==== 2nd ODI ====
2 February 2017
14:00 (D/N)
Scorecard

| New Zealand | v | Australia |

Match abandoned
McLean Park, Napier
Umpires: Chris Brown (NZ) and Kumar Dharmasena (SL)

- No toss.
- The match was abandoned without a ball bowled at 18:45 due to rain and a wet outfield. This was McLean Park's second successive abandoned ODI.

==== 3rd ODI ====
5 February 2017
11:00
Scorecard

| New Zealand; 281/9 (50 overs) | v | Australia; 257 (47 overs) |
| Ross Taylor 107 (101); James Faulkner 3/59 (9 overs) | | Aaron Finch 56 (64); Trent Boult 6/33 (10 overs) |

New Zealand won by 24 runs
Seddon Park, Hamilton
Umpires: Chris Brown (NZ) and Ruchira Palliyaguruge (SL)
Player of the match: Trent Boult (NZ)

- New Zealand won the toss and elected to bat.
- Ross Taylor equaled Nathan Astle's record for the most ODI hundreds by a New Zealand batsman (16). *Trent Boult (NZ) became the first bowler to take a five-wicket haul in an ODI match at Seddon Park.

=== Sri Lanka T20I Series in Australia ===
==== 1st T20I ====
17 February 2017 (D/N)
Scorecard

| Australia; 6/168 (20 overs) | v | Sri Lanka; 5/172 (20 overs) |
| Aaron Finch 43 (34); Lasith Malinga 2/29 (4 overs) | | Asela Gunaratne 52 (37); Ashton Turner 2/12 (2 overs) |

Sri Lanka won by 5 wickets
Melbourne Cricket Ground, Melbourne
Umpires: Mick Martell (Aus) and Paul Wilson (Aus)
Player of the match: Asela Gunaratne (SL)

- Sri Lanka won the toss and elected to field.
- Michael Klinger, Billy Stanlake, Ashton Turner (Aus) and Vikum Sanjaya (SL) all made their T20I debuts. *At the age of 36, Michael Klinger became the oldest player for Australia to debut in a T20I. *Aaron Finch became second fastest batsman and the third Australian to reach 1,000 runs in T20Is.

==== 2nd T20I ====
19 February 2017 (D/N)
Scorecard

| Australia; 173 (20 overs) | v | Sri Lanka; 8/176 (20 overs) |
| Moisés Henriques 56* (37); Nuwan Kulasekara 4/31 (4 overs) | | Asela Gunaratne 84* (46); Andrew Tye 3/37 (4 overs) |

Sri Lanka won by 2 wickets
Kardinia Park, Geelong
Umpires: Simon Fry (Aus) and Sam Nogajski (Aus)
Player of the match: Asela Gunaratne (SL)

- Sri Lanka won the toss and elected to field.
- Jhye Richardson (Aus) made his T20I debut. *Sam Nogajski (Aus) stood in his first T20I as an umpire. *This was the first T20I match to be played at this venue. *Sri Lanka made 36 runs from the final two overs, the most in a successful run-chase in a T20I. *This was Australia's fifth-consecutive loss at home in T20Is, their longest losing streak. *This was the 50th win for Sri Lanka in T20Is, becoming the third team to do so. *Niroshan Dickwella (SL) was given a two-match ban after he showed his dissent at an umpire's decision. He was also fined 30% of his match fee for the incident.

==== 3rd T20I ====
22 February 2017 (D/N)
Scorecard

| Australia; 6/187 (20 overs) | v | Sri Lanka; 146 (18 overs) |
| Michael Klinger 62 (43); Dasun Shanaka 2/27 (4 overs) | | Dilshan Munaweera 37 (25); James Faulkner 3/20 (3 overs) |

Australia won by 41 runs
Adelaide Oval, Adelaide
Umpires: Mick Martell (Aus) and Paul Wilson (Aus)
Player of the match: Adam Zampa (Aus)

- Sri Lanka won the toss and elected to field.
- This was Australia's first win against Sri Lanka at home in a T20I.

=== Test Series in India ===
==== 1st Test ====
23–27 February 2017
Scorecard

| Australia | v | India |
| 260 (94.5 overs); Matt Renshaw 68 (156); Umesh Yadav 4/32 (12 overs) | | 105 (40.1 overs); K. L. Rahul 64 (97); Steve O'Keefe 6/35 (13.1 overs) |
| 285 (87 overs); Steve Smith 109 (202); Ravichandran Ashwin 4/119 (28 overs) | | 107 (33.5 overs); Cheteshwar Pujara 31 (58); Steve O'Keefe 6/35 (15 overs) |

Australia won by 333 runs
Maharashtra Cricket Association Stadium, Pune
Umpires: Richard Kettleborough (Eng) and Nigel Llong (Eng)
Player of the match: Steve O'Keefe (Aus)

- Australia won the toss and elected to bat.
- This was the first Test match at this venue. *Mitchell Starc (Aus) passed 1,000 runs in Tests. *Ravichandran Ashwin (Ind) overtook Kapil Dev's record for the most wickets in a season in India. *Steve O'Keefe (Aus) took his first 5-wicket haul in Tests. He also took five wickets in 19 balls, the joint-second-fewest deliveries for a five-for against India. *India lost their last seven wickets in the first innings for eleven runs, their worst collapse in Tests. *Steve O'Keefe's match figures of 12 for 70 are the best figures by a visiting spin bowler in a Test in India and are also the best match figures for an Australian bowler against India. *This was Australia's first Test win in India since 2004 and the first win by any visiting team in India since 2012.

==== 2nd Test ====
4–8 March 2017
Scorecard

| India | v | Australia |
| 189 (71.2 overs); K. L. Rahul 90 (205); Nathan Lyon 8/50 (22.4 overs) | | 276 (122.4 overs); Shaun Marsh 66 (197); Ravindra Jadeja 6/63 (21.4 overs) |
| 274 (97.1 overs); Cheteshwar Pujara 92 (221); Josh Hazlewood 6/67 (24 overs) | | 112 (35.4 overs); Steve Smith 28 (48); Ravichandran Ashwin 6/41 (12.4 overs) |

India won by 75 runs
M. Chinnaswamy Stadium, Bangalore
Umpires: Richard Illingworth (Eng) and Nigel Llong (Eng)
Player of the match: K. L. Rahul (Ind)

- India won the toss and elected to bat.
- Nathan Lyon (Aus) recorded the best bowling figures by a visiting bowler in India. *Nathan Lyon also became the highest Australian wicket taker against India (with 58 wickets), and the first to take three seven-wicket hauls against India. *This was the first time in a Test that four different bowlers each took six wickets in an innings. *Ravichandran Ashwin (Ind) took his 25th five-wicket haul, achieving it in the fewest Tests (47).

==== 3rd Test ====
16–20 March 2017
Scorecard

| Australia | v | India |
| 451 (137.3 overs); Steve Smith 178* (361); Ravindra Jadeja 5/124 (49.3 overs) | | 603/9d (210 overs); Cheteshwar Pujara 202 (525); Pat Cummins 4/106 (39 overs) |
| 204/6 (100 overs); Peter Handscomb 72* (200); Ravindra Jadeja 4/54 (44 overs) |

Match drawn
JSCA International Stadium Complex, Ranchi
Umpires: Chris Gaffaney (NZ) and Ian Gould (Eng)
Player of the match: Cheteshwar Pujara (Ind)

- Australia won the toss and elected to bat.
- This was the first Test to be played at this venue and the 800th Test played by Australia. *Murali Vijay (Ind) played his 50th Test. *Steve Smith (Aus) passed 5,000 runs in Tests, becoming the third-fastest and youngest Australian batsman to do so. *Glenn Maxwell (Aus) scored his maiden Test century and became the second player for Australia to score a century in all three international formats. *Steve Smith and Glenn Maxwell's partnership of 191 runs is Australia's highest 5th wicket partnership in India and the 4th highest 5th wicket partnership overall by visiting teams in India. *Steve Smith's score of 178 not out is the highest score by an Australian captain in India and 3rd highest overall score by an Australian in India. *Cheteshwar Pujara (Ind) faced 525 balls for his 202 runs, the most deliveries faced by an Indian batsmen in a Test innings. *The 199-run partnership between Pujara and Wriddhiman Saha was the highest seventh-wicket stand for India against Australia in Tests.

Draw

==== 4th Test ====
25–29 March 2017
Scorecard

| Australia | v | India |
| 300 (88.3 overs); Steve Smith 111 (173); Kuldeep Yadav 4/68 (23 overs) | | 332 (118.1 overs); Ravindra Jadeja 63 (95); Nathan Lyon 5/92 (32.1 overs) |
| 137 (53.5 overs); Glenn Maxwell 45 (60); Ravindra Jadeja 3/24 (18 overs) | | 106/2 (23.5 overs); K. L. Rahul 51* (76); Pat Cummins 1/42 (8 overs) |

India won by 8 wickets
Himachal Pradesh Cricket Association Stadium, Dharamshala
Umpires: Marais Erasmus (SA) and Ian Gould (Eng)
Player of the match: Ravindra Jadeja (Ind)

- Australia won the toss and elected to bat.
- This was the first Test to be played at this venue. *Ajinkya Rahane (Ind) captained India for the first time in Tests. *Kuldeep Yadav (Ind) made his Test debut. *Steve Smith became the first batsman for Australia to score three hundreds in a series in India. *Ravichandran Ashwin (Ind) took his 79th wicket in the 2016–17 season, the most for a bowler in a single season.

== See also ==
- Australia national cricket team
