= Sri Lankan cricket team against Pakistan in the UAE in 2017–18 =

International cricket tour

Sri Lankan cricket team against Pakistan in 2017–18
	Pakistan	Sri Lanka
- Dates: 28 September – 29 October 2017
Captains	Sarfaraz Ahmed	Dinesh Chandimal (Tests); Upul Tharanga (ODIs); Thisara Perera (T20Is)

Test series
- Result: Sri Lanka won the 2-match series 2–0
Most runs	Asad Shafiq (183)	Dimuth Karunaratne (306)
Most wickets	Yasir Shah (16)	Rangana Herath (16)
- Player of the series: Dimuth Karunaratne (SL)

One Day International series
- Results: Pakistan won the 5-match series 5–0
Most runs	Babar Azam (303)	Upul Tharanga (199)
Most wickets	Hasan Ali (14)	Lahiru Gamage (7)
- Player of the series: Hasan Ali (Pak)

Twenty20 International series
- Results: Pakistan won the 3-match series 3–0
Most runs	Shoaib Malik (102)	Danushka Gunathilaka (78)
Most wickets	Faheem Ashraf (6); Hasan Ali (6)	Vikum Sanjaya (4)
- Player of the series: Shoaib Malik (Pak)

The Sri Lanka cricket team toured the United Arab Emirates in September and October 2017 to play two Tests, five One Day Internationals (ODIs) and three Twenty20 International (T20I) matches against the Pakistan cricket team. The tour included the first Tests that Sarfaraz Ahmed of Pakistan captained following the retirement of Misbah-ul-Haq. The tour also featured a T20I match in Pakistan, the first time that Sri Lanka had visited the country since 2009.

On 27 September 2017, the Pakistan Cricket Board (PCB) named umpires for the Test and ODI fixtures. The second Test match was played as a day/night fixture, the first day/night Test for Sri Lanka. Sri Lanka won the Test series 2–0. It was Pakistan's first whitewash in the United Arab Emirates, and only their second whitewash in a home series, after losing 3–0 to Australia in October 2002. Pakistan won the ODI series 5–0. Sri Lanka became the first side to be whitewashed 5–0 three times in ODIs in the same calendar year, after previously losing to South Africa in January and India in August.

== Return to Pakistan ==
In August 2017, Thilanga Sumathipala, president of Sri Lanka Cricket, said that he would like to play at least one of the three T20I matches in Lahore, Pakistan during October. In March 2009, the Sri Lanka cricket team were attacked by terrorists while travelling to the Gaddafi Stadium in Lahore. Since then, the only Test side to visit Pakistan had been Zimbabwe, when they toured during May 2015. Two members of Sri Lanka's current team, Chamara Kapugedera and Suranga Lakmal were on the bus during the 2009 terrorist attack, and both could have been selected for the T20I squad for this series.

In September 2017, the fixtures were confirmed, with the final T20I match of the series scheduled to be played in Lahore. Sri Lanka Cricket said that players have a "contractual obligation" to play the match in Lahore, but it was unlikely to issue penalties to any player who chose not to visit Pakistan. However, on 14 October 2017, the Sri Lankan team expressed their reluctance to travel to Pakistan, requesting that the fixture be moved to a neutral venue. On 16 October 2017, Sri Lanka Cricket confirmed that the fixture in Lahore would go ahead as planned, but their limited-overs captain, Upul Tharanga, had pulled out of the match. Despite the concerns from the players, team manager Asanka Gurusinha felt that a competitive squad would be named. On 19 October 2017, Sri Lanka's chief selector, Graham Labrooy, said that players who do not travel to Lahore would be unlikely to be selected for the other two T20I fixtures. The squad for the T20I fixtures was named two days later, with Thisara Perera selected as captain.

The Sri Lankan squad arrived in Lahore under "extraordinary" security and made their way to the team's hotel in a bomb-proof bus. Ahead of the T20I in Lahore, Cricket Sri Lanka's president Thilanga Sumathipala said that the team was privileged to be in Pakistan and that he would help support the country in hosting more tours. Najam Sethi, then chairman of the PCB, said that this fixture would be the start of international cricket's return to the country, and that he expected every country to play in Pakistan by the end of 2020. Pakistan went on to win the T20I series 3–0. Following the conclusion of the match, the Asian Cricket Council announced that the 2018 ACC Emerging Teams Asia Cup would be played in Pakistan in April. However, the tournament was moved to December 2018, with Pakistan and Sri Lanka co-hosting the event.

== Squads ==
Tests		ODIs		T20Is	
Pakistan	Sri Lanka	Pakistan	Sri Lanka	Pakistan	Sri Lanka
Sarfaraz Ahmed (c, wk); Mohammad Abbas; Azhar Ali; Hasan Ali; Mohammad Amir; Mohammad Asghar; Bilal Asif; Sami Aslam; Babar Azam; Mir Hamza; Shan Masood; Wahab Riaz; Usman Salahuddin; Asad Shafiq; Yasir Shah; Haris Sohail	Dinesh Chandimal (c); Lahiru Thirimanne (vc); Niroshan Dickwella (wk); Vishwa Fernando; Lahiru Gamage; Rangana Herath; Dimuth Karunaratne; Suranga Lakmal; Kusal Mendis; Dilruwan Perera; Nuwan Pradeep; Sadeera Samarawickrama; Lakshan Sandakan; Kaushal Silva; Roshen Silva	Sarfaraz Ahmed (c, wk); Hasan Ali; Mohammad Amir; Faheem Ashraf; Babar Azam; Mohammad Hafeez; Junaid Khan; Shadab Khan; Shoaib Malik; Rumman Raees; Ahmed Shehzad; Usman Shinwari; Haris Sohail; Imad Wasim; Fakhar Zaman; Imam-ul-Haq	Upul Tharanga (c); Dushmantha Chameera; Dinesh Chandimal; Akila Dananjaya; Niroshan Dickwella (wk); Vishwa Fernando; Lahiru Gamage; Chamara Kapugedera; Suranga Lakmal; Kusal Mendis; Thisara Perera; ~~Nuwan Pradeep~~; Seekkuge Prasanna; Sadeera Samarawickrama; Milinda Siriwardana; Lahiru Thirimanne; Jeffrey Vandersay	Sarfaraz Ahmed (c, wk); Hasan Ali; Umar Amin; Mohammad Amir; Faheem Ashraf; Babar Azam; Mohammad Hafeez; Shadab Khan; Shoaib Malik; Mohammad Nawaz; Rumman Raees; Ahmed Shehzad; Usman Shinwari; Imad Wasim; Aamer Yamin; Fakhar Zaman	Thisara Perera (c); Minod Bhanuka; Chaturanga de Silva; Vishwa Fernando; Lahiru Gamage; Danushka Gunathilaka; Dilshan Munaweera; Sachith Pathirana; Seekkuge Prasanna; Ashan Priyanjan; Sadeera Samarawickrama; Vikum Sanjaya; Dasun Shanaka; Isuru Udana; Mahela Udawatte; Jeffrey Vandersay

Ahead of the ODI series, Mohammad Amir was ruled out of Pakistan's squad with an injury, with Usman Shinwari added as his replacement. Nuwan Pradeep was ruled out of Sri Lanka's ODI squad with an injury, with Lahiru Gamage added as his replacement. Ahead of the third ODI, Sadeera Samarawickrama was added to Sri Lanka's ODI squad.

== Test series ==
=== 1st Test ===
28 September–2 October 2017
Scorecard

Sri Lanka	v	Pakistan
419 (154.5 overs); Dinesh Chandimal 155* (372); Mohammad Abbas 3/75 (26.5 overs)		422 (162.3 overs); Azhar Ali 85 (226); Rangana Herath 5/93 (40 overs)
138 (66.5 overs); Niroshan Dickwella 40* (76); Yasir Shah 5/51 (27 overs)		114 (47.4 overs); Haris Sohail 34 (69); Rangana Herath 6/43 (21.4 overs)

Sri Lanka won by 21 runs
Sheikh Zayed Cricket Stadium, Abu Dhabi
Umpires: Richard Kettleborough (Eng) and Nigel Llong (Eng)
Player of the match: Rangana Herath (SL)

- Sri Lanka won the toss and elected to bat.
- Haris Sohail (Pak) made his Test debut.
- Sarfaraz Ahmed became the 32nd captain of Pakistan in Tests.
- Umpire Ian Gould was ill and did not take to the field. He was replaced by Richard Kettleborough.
- Yasir Shah (Pak) took his 150th wicket in Tests and became the quickest spinner and joint-second quickest bowler overall to do so.
- Azhar Ali (Pak) became the 8th batsman for Pakistan to reach 5,000 runs in Tests.
- Rangana Herath (SL) took his 400th wicket and became the first bowler to take 100 wickets against Pakistan in Tests.
- This was the first time that Pakistan had lost a Test in Abu Dhabi.

=== 2nd Test ===
6–10 October 2017 (D/N)
Scorecard

Sri Lanka	v	Pakistan
482 (159.2 overs); Dimuth Karunaratne 196 (405); Yasir Shah 6/184 (55.5 overs)		262 (90.3 overs); Azhar Ali 59 (128); Dilruwan Perera 3/72 (26 overs)
96 (26 overs); Kusal Mendis 29 (49); Wahab Riaz 4/41 (9 overs)		248 (90.2 overs); Asad Shafiq 112 (176); Dilruwan Perera 5/98 (26 overs)

Sri Lanka won by 68 runs
Dubai International Cricket Stadium, Dubai
Umpires: Richard Kettleborough (Eng) and Nigel Llong (Eng)
Player of the match: Dimuth Karunaratne (SL)

- Sri Lanka won the toss and elected to bat.
- Lahiru Gamage and Sadeera Samarawickrama (SL) both made their Test debuts.
- This was Sri Lanka's first day/night Test.

== ODI series ==
=== 1st ODI ===
13 October 2017
15:00 (D/N)
Scorecard

Pakistan; 292/6 (50 overs)	v	Sri Lanka; 209/8 (50 overs)
Babar Azam 103 (131); Suranga Lakmal 2/47 (10 overs)		Lahiru Thirimanne 53 (74); Hasan Ali 3/36 (9 overs)

Pakistan won by 83 runs
Dubai International Cricket Stadium, Dubai
Umpires: Ahsan Raza (Pak) and Sundaram Ravi (Ind)
Player of the match: Shoaib Malik (Pak)

- Sri Lanka won the toss and elected to field.

=== 2nd ODI ===
16 October 2017
15:00 (D/N)
Scorecard

Pakistan; 219/9 (50 overs)	v	Sri Lanka; 187 (48 overs)
Babar Azam 101 (133); Lahiru Gamage 4/57 (10 overs)		Upul Tharanga 112* (144); Shadab Khan 3/47 (9 overs)

Pakistan won by 32 runs
Sheikh Zayed Cricket Stadium, Abu Dhabi
Umpires: Richard Kettleborough (Eng) and Shozab Raza (Pak)
Player of the match: Shadab Khan (Pak)

- Pakistan won the toss and elected to bat.
- Babar Azam (Pak) became the first batsman to score five consecutive centuries in the same country in ODIs.
- Upul Tharanga became the first batsman for Sri Lanka to carry his bat in an ODI.

=== 3rd ODI ===
18 October 2017
15:00 (D/N)
Scorecard

Sri Lanka; 208 (48.2 overs)	v	Pakistan; 209/3 (42.3 overs)
Upul Tharanga 61 (80); Hasan Ali 5/34 (10 overs)		Imam-ul-Haq 100 (125); Thisara Perera 1/22 (4 overs)

Pakistan won by 7 wickets
Sheikh Zayed Cricket Stadium, Abu Dhabi
Umpires: Sundaram Ravi (Ind) and Ahsan Raza (Pak)
Player of the match: Imam-ul-Haq (Pak)

- Sri Lanka won the toss and elected to bat.
- Imam-ul-Haq (Pak) made his ODI debut, becoming the 13th batsman to score a century on debut.
- Hasan Ali became fastest bowler for Pakistan to take 50 wickets, in terms of matches played, in ODIs (24).

=== 4th ODI ===
20 October 2017
14:00 (D/N)
Scorecard

Sri Lanka; 173 (43.4 overs)	v	Pakistan; 177/3 (39 overs)
Lahiru Thirimanne 62 (94); Hasan Ali 3/37 (8.4 overs)		Shoaib Malik 69* (81); Lahiru Gamage 1/27 (5 overs)

Pakistan won by 7 wickets
Sharjah Cricket Stadium, Sharjah
Umpires: Richard Kettleborough (Eng) and Shozab Raza (Pak)
Player of the match: Babar Azam (Pak)

- Sri Lanka won the toss and elected to bat.
- Usman Shinwari (Pak) and Sadeera Samarawickrama (SL) both made their ODI debuts.

=== 5th ODI ===
23 October 2017
14:00 (D/N)
Scorecard

Sri Lanka; 103 (26.2 overs)	v	Pakistan; 105/1 (20.2 overs)
Thisara Perera 25 (29); Usman Shinwari 5/34 (7 overs)		Fakhar Zaman 48 (47); Jeffrey Vandersay 1/30 (6.1 overs)

Pakistan won by 9 wickets
Sharjah Cricket Stadium, Sharjah
Umpires: Sundaram Ravi (Ind) and Ahsan Raza (Pak)
Player of the match: Usman Shinwari (Pak)

- Sri Lanka won the toss and elected to bat.
- Usman Shinwari (Pak) took his first five-wicket haul in ODIs.

== T20I series ==
=== 1st T20I ===
26 October 2017
20:00 (N)
Scorecard

Sri Lanka; 102 (18.3 overs)	v	Pakistan; 103/3 (17.2 overs)
Seekkuge Prasanna 23* (23); Hasan Ali 3/23 (3.3 overs)		Shoaib Malik 42* (31); Vikum Sanjaya 2/20 (4 overs)

Pakistan won by 7 wickets
Sheikh Zayed Cricket Stadium, Abu Dhabi
Umpires: Ahsan Raza (Pak) and Shozab Raza (Pak)
Player of the match: Usman Shinwari (Pak)

- Pakistan won the toss and elected to field.
- Thisara Perera (SL) became the 9th captain of Sri Lanka in T20Is.
- Sadeera Samarawickrama (SL) made his T20I debut.

=== 2nd T20I ===
27 October 2017
20:00 (N)
Scorecard

Sri Lanka; 124/9 (20 overs)	v	Pakistan; 125/8 (19.5 overs)
Danushka Gunathilaka 51 (48); Faheem Ashraf 3/16 (3 overs)		Sarfaraz Ahmed 28 (26); Thisara Perera 3/24 (4 overs)

Pakistan won by 2 wickets
Sheikh Zayed Cricket Stadium, Abu Dhabi
Umpires: Shozab Raza (Pak) and Ahmed Shahab (Pak)
Player of the match: Shadab Khan (Pak)

- Pakistan won the toss and elected to field.
- Faheem Ashraf (Pak) became the first bowler for Pakistan, and sixth player overall, to take a hat-trick in a T20I.

=== 3rd T20I ===
29 October 2017
18:00 (N)
Scorecard

Pakistan; 180/3 (20 overs)	v	Sri Lanka; 144/9 (20 overs)
Shoaib Malik 51 (24); Dilshan Munaweera 1/26 (4 overs)		Dasun Shanaka 54 (36); Mohammad Amir 4/13 (4 overs)

Pakistan won by 36 runs
Gaddafi Stadium, Lahore
Umpires: Ahsan Raza (Pak) and Ahmed Shahab (Pak)
Player of the match: Shoaib Malik (Pak)

- Sri Lanka won the toss and elected to field.
- Chaturanga de Silva (SL) made his T20I debut.
