= Bangladeshi cricket team in Sri Lanka in 2016–17 =

International cricket tour

	Sri Lanka	Bangladesh
- Dates: 2 March – 6 April 2017
Captains	Rangana Herath (Tests); Upul Tharanga (ODIs & T20Is)	Mushfiqur Rahim (Tests); Mashrafe Mortaza (ODIs & T20Is)

Test series
- Result: 2-match series drawn 1–1
Most runs	Kusal Mendis (254)	Tamim Iqbal (207)
Most wickets	Rangana Herath (16)	Mehedi Hasan (10)
- Player of the series: Shakib Al Hasan (Ban)

One Day International series
- Results: 3-match series drawn 1–1
Most runs	Kusal Mendis (160)	Tamim Iqbal (131)
Most wickets	Nuwan Kulasekara (4); Suranga Lakmal (4)	Taskin Ahmed (6); Mashrafe Mortaza (6); Mustafizur Rahman (6)
- Player of the series: Kusal Mendis (SL)

Twenty20 International series
- Results: 2-match series drawn 1–1
Most runs	Kusal Perera (81)	Soumya Sarkar (63)
Most wickets	Lasith Malinga (5)	Mustafizur Rahman (4)
- Player of the series: Lasith Malinga (SL)

The Bangladesh national cricket team toured Sri Lanka from March 2017 to April 2017. The tour consisted of two Test matches, three One Day Internationals (ODIs) and two Twenty20 internationals (T20Is). The second Test match of the tour was the 100th Test played by Bangladesh. The tour also featured a two-day warm-up match ahead of the Test fixtures and a one-day warm-up match ahead of the ODIs. The Test series was titled the Joy Bangla Cup in honour of Sheikh Mujibur Rahman, the founder of Bangladesh.

Before the series, Sri Lanka's captain Angelo Mathews was ruled out of the Test matches with a hamstring injury. Rangana Herath was named as captain in his place. Mathews failed to recover in time for the ODI and T20I series, with Upul Tharanga named captain of the team for both formats.

The Test series was drawn 1–1, with Bangladesh winning the second match by 4 wickets. It was their first win against Sri Lanka in a Test match. The victory was their ninth win in Tests and their fourth overseas. The ODI series was drawn 1–1, with the second of the third match ending in a no result, due to rain. The T20I series also finished 1–1.

After the conclusion of the ODI series, Bangladesh's captain, Mashrafe Mortaza, was suspended for one match for maintaining a slow over-rate in the third game. Therefore, he did not play in Bangladesh's first fixture of the 2017 Ireland Tri-Nation Series in May 2017. During the coin toss of the first T20I, Mashrafe announced his retirement from T20Is following the conclusion of the series.

== Squads ==
Tests		ODIs		T20Is	
Sri Lanka	Bangladesh	Sri Lanka	Bangladesh	Sri Lanka	Bangladesh
Rangana Herath (c); Dinesh Chandimal (wk); Dhananjaya de Silva; Niroshan Dickwella; Asela Gunaratne; Dimuth Karunaratne; Lahiru Kumara; Suranga Lakmal; Kusal Mendis; Dilruwan Perera; Nuwan Pradeep; Malinda Pushpakumara; Lakshan Sandakan; Vikum Sanjaya; Upul Tharanga	Mushfiqur Rahim (c, wk); Taskin Ahmed; ~~Litton Das (wk)~~; Mominul Haque; Mehedi Hasan; Shakib Al Hasan; Mosaddek Hossain; Rubel Hossain; Tamim Iqbal; Taijul Islam; Mahmudullah; Kamrul Islam Rabbi; Mustafizur Rahman; Sabbir Rahman; Subashis Roy; Soumya Sarkar	Upul Tharanga (c); Dinesh Chandimal; Dhananjaya de Silva; ~~Niroshan Dickwella (wk)~~; Asela Gunaratne; Danushka Gunathilaka; Nuwan Kulasekara; Lahiru Kumara; Suranga Lakmal; Kusal Mendis; Sachith Pathirana; Dilruwan Perera; Kusal Perera; Thisara Perera; Nuwan Pradeep; Seekkuge Prasanna; Lakshan Sandakan; Vikum Sanjaya	Mashrafe Mortaza (c); Taskin Ahmed; Mehedi Hasan; Nurul Hasan (wk); Shakib Al Hasan; Shuvagata Hom; Mosaddek Hossain; Rubel Hossain; Tamim Iqbal; Sunzamul Islam; Imrul Kayes; Mahmudullah; Sabbir Rahman; Mustafizur Rahman; Mushfiqur Rahim; Subashis Roy; Soumya Sarkar	Upul Tharanga (c); Asela Gunaratne; Danushka Gunathilaka; Chamara Kapugedara; Shehan Jayasuriya; Nuwan Kulasekara; Lasith Malinga; Dilshan Munaweera; Kusal Perera; Thisara Perera; Seekkuge Prasanna; Lakshan Sandakan; Vikum Sanjaya; Dasun Shanaka; Milinda Siriwardana; Isuru Udana; Sandun Weerakkody	Mashrafe Mortaza (c); Taskin Ahmed; Shakib Al Hasan; Mehedi Hasan; Nurul Hasan; Mosaddek Hossain; Tamim Iqbal; Sunzamul Islam; Imrul Kayes; Mahmudullah; Mushfiqur Rahim; Mustafizur Rahman; Sabbir Rahman; Subashis Roy; Mohammad Saifuddin; Soumya Sarkar

Bangladesh's captain Mushfiqur Rahim was asked to play as a batsman only, with Litton Das becoming the wicket-keeper for the Test series. However, Das suffered a fractured rib during training ahead of the second Test, with Mushfiqur Rahim returning as the wicket-keeper for the final Test. Kusal Perera was ruled out of Sri Lanka's squad for the first two ODI matches, but he was expected to be fit for the third and final match. Mehedi Hasan was added to Bangladesh's ODI squad before the start of the limited-overs series. Niroshan Dickwella suffered a fracture to his hand in the first ODI and was ruled out of the rest of the series. Dilruwan Perera, Nuwan Kulasekara and Nuwan Pradeep were all added to Sri Lanka's ODI squad. Kusal Perera was included in Sri Lanka's T20I squad, subject to fitness, with Sandun Weerakkody added as cover, if needed.

== Tour matches ==
=== Two-day match: Sri Lanka Cricket President's XI v Bangladesh ===
2–3 March 2017
Scorecard

Bangladesh	v	Sri Lanka Cricket President's XI
391/7 (90 overs); Tamim Iqbal 136 (182); Chamika Karunaratne 3/61 (17 overs)		403/7 (90 overs); Dinesh Chandimal 190* (253); Taskin Ahmed 3/41 (11 overs)

Match drawn
De Soysa Stadium, Moratuwa
Umpires: Ravindra Kottahachchi (SL) and Pradeep Udawatta (SL)

- Sri Lanka Cricket President's XI won the toss and elected to field.
- 12 players per side (11 batting, 11 fielding).

=== One-day match: Sri Lanka Cricket President's XI v Bangladesh ===
22 March 2017
Scorecard

Sri Lanka Cricket President's XI; 354/7 (50 overs)	v	Bangladesh; 352/8 (50 overs)
Sandun Weerakkody 67 (54); Sunzamul Islam 1/27 (6 overs)		Sabbir Rahman 72 (63); Akila Dananjaya 3/61 (8 overs)

Sri Lanka Cricket President's XI won by 2 runs
Colombo Cricket Club Ground, Colombo
Umpires: Hemantha Boteju (SL) and Lyndon Hannibal (SL)

- Bangladesh won the toss and elected to field.
- 18 players per side (11 batting, 11 fielding).

== Test series ==
=== 1st Test ===
7–11 March 2017
Scorecard

Sri Lanka	v	Bangladesh
494 (129.1 overs); Kusal Mendis 194 (285); Mehedi Hasan 4/113 (22 overs)		312 (97.2 overs); Mushfiqur Rahim 85 (161); Dilruwan Perera 3/53 (19 overs)
274/6d (69 overs); Upul Tharanga 115 (171); Mehedi Hasan 2/77 (20 overs)		197 (60.2 overs); Soumya Sarkar 53 (49); Rangana Herath 6/59 (20.2 overs)

Sri Lanka won by 259 runs
Galle International Stadium, Galle
Umpires: Aleem Dar (Pak) and Marais Erasmus (SA)
Player of the match: Kusal Mendis (SL)

- Sri Lanka won the toss and elected to bat.
- Rain washed out the third session on day 3.
- With the wicket of Litton Das (Ban), Rangana Herath (SL) recorded the most wickets taken by a left-arm spinner in Tests, surpassing 362 wickets by Daniel Vettori (NZ).
- Rangana Herath became the first player to win his first three Tests as captain of Sri Lanka.

=== 2nd Test ===
15–19 March 2017
Scorecard

Sri Lanka	v	Bangladesh
338 (113.3 overs); Dinesh Chandimal 138 (300); Mehedi Hasan 3/90 (21 overs)		467 (134.1 overs); Shakib Al Hasan 116 (159); Rangana Herath 4/82 (34.1 overs)
319 (113.2 overs); Dimuth Karunaratne 126 (244); Shakib Al Hasan 4/74 (36.2 overs)		191/6 (57.5 overs); Tamim Iqbal 82 (125); Dilruwan Perera 3/59 (22 overs)

Bangladesh won by 4 wickets
P. Sara Oval, Colombo
Umpires: Aleem Dar (Pak) and Sundaram Ravi (Ind)
Player of the match: Tamim Iqbal (Ban)

- Sri Lanka won the toss and elected to bat.
- This was Bangladesh's 100th Test match.
- Mosaddek Hossain (Ban) made his Test debut.
- Rangana Herath took his 1,000 first-class wicket, becoming the second Sri Lankan to do so.
- Mushfiqur Rahim became the first wicket-keeper for Bangladesh to take 100 dismissals in Tests.
- This was Bangladesh's first win against Sri Lanka in Tests.

== ODI series ==
=== 1st ODI ===
25 March 2017
14:30 (D/N)
Scorecard

Bangladesh; 324/5 (50 overs)	v	Sri Lanka; 234 (45.1 overs)
Tamim Iqbal 127 (142); Suranga Lakmal 2/45 (8 overs)		Dinesh Chandimal 59 (70); Mustafizur Rahman 3/56 (8.1 overs)

Bangladesh won by 90 runs
Rangiri Dambulla International Stadium, Dambulla
Umpires: Michael Gough (Eng) and Ranmore Martinesz (SL)
Player of the match: Tamim Iqbal (Ban)

- Sri Lanka won the toss and elected to field.
- Mehedi Hasan (Ban) made his ODI debut.
- Tamim Iqbal became the first batsman for Bangladesh to score 10,000 international runs across all formats.
- This was the highest total scored by Bangladesh against Sri Lanka and their first win when batting first in an ODI.

=== 2nd ODI ===
28 March 2017
14:30 (D/N)
Scorecard

Sri Lanka; 311 (49.5 overs)	v	Bangladesh
Kusal Mendis 102 (107); Taskin Ahmed 4/47 (8.5 overs)

No result
Rangiri Dambulla International Stadium, Dambulla
Umpires: Ruchira Palliyaguruge (SL) and Sundaram Ravi (Ind)

- Sri Lanka won the toss and elected to bat.
- Heavy rain during the innings break prevented any further play and the match was abandoned.
- Upul Tharanga (SL) played in his 200th ODI.
- Kusal Mendis (SL) scored his first ODI century.
- Taskin Ahmed (Ban) took a hat-trick.
- This was the 50th ODI held at Rangiri Dambulla International Stadium.

=== 3rd ODI ===
1 April 2017
09:30
Scorecard

Sri Lanka; 280/9 (50 overs)	v	Bangladesh; 210 (44.3 overs)
Kusal Mendis 54 (76); Mashrafe Mortaza 3/65 (10 overs)		Shakib Al Hasan 54 (62); Nuwan Kulasekara 4/37 (7.3 overs)

Sri Lanka won by 70 runs
Sinhalese Sports Club Ground, Colombo
Umpires: Michael Gough (Eng) and Ruchira Palliyaguruge (SL)
Player of the match: Thisara Perera (SL)

- Bangladesh won the toss and elected to field.

== T20I series ==
=== 1st T20I ===
4 April 2017
19:00 (D/N)
Scorecard

Bangladesh; 155/6 (20 overs)	v	Sri Lanka; 158/4 (18.5 overs)
Mosaddek Hossain 34* (30); Lasith Malinga 2/38 (4 overs)		Kusal Perera 77 (53); Mashrafe Mortaza 2/32 (4 overs)

Sri Lanka won by 6 wickets
R. Premadasa Stadium, Colombo
Umpires: Ranmore Martinesz (SL) and Raveendra Wimalasiri (SL)
Player of the match: Kusal Perera (SL)

- Bangladesh won the toss and elected to bat.
- Mohammad Saifuddin (Ban) made his T20I debut.

=== 2nd T20I ===
6 April 2017
19:00 (D/N)
Scorecard

Bangladesh; 176/9 (20 overs)	v	Sri Lanka; 131 (18 overs)
Shakib Al Hasan 38 (31); Lasith Malinga 3/34 (4 overs)		Chamara Kapugedera 50 (35); Mustafizur Rahman 4/21 (3 overs)

Bangladesh won by 45 runs
R. Premadasa Stadium, Colombo
Umpires: Ranmore Martinesz (SL) and Ruchira Palliyaguruge (SL)
Player of the match: Shakib Al Hasan (Ban)

- Bangladesh won the toss and elected to bat.
- Mehedi Hasan (Ban) made his T20I debut.
- Mashrafe Mortaza (Ban) played in his final T20I.
- Lasith Malinga (SL) took a hat-trick.
