= Sri Lankan cricket team in Australia in 2016–17 =

International cricket tour

	Australia	Sri Lanka
- Dates: 15 – 22 February 2017
Captains	Aaron Finch	Upul Tharanga

Twenty20 International series
- Results: Sri Lanka won the 3-match series 2–1
Most runs	Michael Klinger (143)	Asela Gunaratne (140)
Most wickets	James Faulkner; Adam Zampa (5)	Lasith Malinga (6)
- Player of the series: Asela Gunaratne (SL)

The Sri Lanka cricket team toured Australia in February 2017 to play three Twenty20 International (T20Is) matches. Cricket Australia confirmed the venues in August 2016 with the tour starting in Melbourne, before heading to the first-ever international cricket match to be held at Kardinia Park, Geelong with the final T20 to be held at Adelaide Oval. With both Steve Smith and David Warner unavailable due to the scheduling of the series against India, Aaron Finch was named as Australia's captain for the series. Sri Lanka's T20I captain Angelo Mathews was unavailable for the tour, after suffering a hamstring injury during the second T20I against South Africa in January 2017.

Ahead of the T20I series, there was a twenty-over tour match between Prime Minister's XI and Sri Lanka. Adam Voges captained the Prime Minister's XI side in his last international match before he retired. In the T20I series, Sri Lanka won the three-match T20I series 2–1.

== Squads ==
Australia	Sri Lanka
Aaron Finch (c); Pat Cummins; Ben Dunk; James Faulkner; Travis Head; Moisés Henriques; Michael Klinger; ~~Chris Lynn~~; Tim Paine (wk); Jhye Richardson; Billy Stanlake; Ashton Turner; Andrew Tye; Adam Zampa	Upul Tharanga (c); Niroshan Dickwella (wk); Asela Gunaratne; Chamara Kapugedara; Nuwan Kulasekara; Lasith Malinga; Kusal Mendis; Dilshan Munaweera; Sachith Pathirana; Seekkuge Prasanna; Lakshan Sandakan; Vikum Sanjaya; Dasun Shanaka; Milinda Siriwardana; Isuru Udana

Australia's Chris Lynn was injured prior to the series and was replaced by Ben Dunk.

== Tour match ==
=== 20-over match: Prime Minister's XI v Sri Lanka ===
15 February 2017 (D/N)
Scorecard

Prime Minister's XI (Australia); 6/169 (20 overs)	v	Sri Lanka; 5/170 (17.1 overs)
Sam Heazlett 58 (37); Vikum Sanjaya 3/26 (4 overs)		Niroshan Dickwella 47 (26); D'Arcy Short 2/19 (3 overs)

Sri Lanka won by 5 wickets
Manuka Oval, Canberra
Umpires: Andrew Crozier (Aus) and Sam Nogajski (Aus)

- Sri Lanka won the toss and elected to field.
- Harry Conway and Jason Sangha (Prime Minister's XI) both made their T20 debuts.

== T20I series ==
=== 1st T20I ===
17 February 2017 (D/N)
Scorecard

Australia; 6/168 (20 overs)	v	Sri Lanka; 5/172 (20 overs)
Aaron Finch 43 (34); Lasith Malinga 2/29 (4 overs)		Asela Gunaratne 52 (37); Ashton Turner 2/12 (2 overs)

Sri Lanka won by 5 wickets
Melbourne Cricket Ground, Melbourne
Umpires: Mick Martell (Aus) and Paul Wilson (Aus)
Player of the match: Asela Gunaratne (SL)

- Sri Lanka won the toss and elected to field.
- Michael Klinger, Billy Stanlake, Ashton Turner (Aus) and Vikum Sanjaya (SL) all made their T20I debuts.
- At the age of 36, Michael Klinger became the oldest player for Australia to debut in a T20I.
- Aaron Finch became second fastest batsman and the third Australian to reach 1,000 runs in T20Is.

=== 2nd T20I ===
19 February 2017 (D/N)
Scorecard

Australia; 173 (20 overs)	v	Sri Lanka; 8/176 (20 overs)
Moisés Henriques 56* (37); Nuwan Kulasekara 4/31 (4 overs)		Asela Gunaratne 84* (46); Andrew Tye 3/37 (4 overs)

Sri Lanka won by 2 wickets
Kardinia Park, Geelong
Umpires: Simon Fry (Aus) and Sam Nogajski (Aus)
Player of the match: Asela Gunaratne (SL)

- Sri Lanka won the toss and elected to field.
- Jhye Richardson (Aus) made his T20I debut.
- Sam Nogajski (Aus) stood in his first T20I as an umpire.
- This was the first T20I match to be played at this venue.
- Sri Lanka made 36 runs from the final two overs, the most in a successful run-chase in a T20I.
- This was Australia's fifth-consecutive loss at home in T20Is, their longest losing streak.
- This was the 50th win for Sri Lanka in T20Is, becoming the third team to do so.
- Niroshan Dickwella (SL) was given a two-match ban after he showed his dissent at an umpire's decision. He was also fined 30% of his match fee for the incident.

=== 3rd T20I ===
22 February 2017 (D/N)
Scorecard

Australia; 6/187 (20 overs)	v	Sri Lanka; 146 (18 overs)
Michael Klinger 62 (43); Dasun Shanaka 2/27 (4 overs)		Dilshan Munaweera 37 (25); James Faulkner 3/20 (3 overs)

Australia won by 41 runs
Adelaide Oval, Adelaide
Umpires: Mick Martell (Aus) and Paul Wilson (Aus)
Player of the match: Adam Zampa (Aus)

- Sri Lanka won the toss and elected to field.
- This was Australia's first win against Sri Lanka at home in a T20I.
