= South African cricket team in Sri Lanka in 2014 =

	Sri Lanka	South Africa
- Dates: 3 July 2014 – 28 July 2014
Captains	Angelo Mathews	Hashim Amla (Tests); AB de Villiers (ODIs)

Test series
- Result: South Africa won the 2-match series 1–0
Most runs	Angelo Mathews (242)	Hashim Amla (197)
Most wickets	Dilruwan Perera (16)	Dale Steyn (13)
- Player of the series: Dilruwan Perera (SL)

One Day International series
- Results: South Africa won the 3-match series 2–1
Most runs	Hashim Amla (258)	Tillakaratne Dilshan (156)
Most wickets	Ryan McLaren (9)	Ajantha Mendis (7)
- Player of the series: Hashim Amla (SA)

The South African national cricket team toured Sri Lanka in July 2014 to play two Test matches and three One Day International matches. The Test series was originally scheduled for July 2013 but was then postponed until 2015, primarily to accommodate scheduling changes requested by Sri Lanka Cricket, before being brought forward to July 2014.

== Squads ==
Tests		ODIs	
Sri Lanka	South Africa	Sri Lanka	South Africa
Angelo Mathews (c); Lahiru Thirimanne (vc); Upul Tharanga; Kaushal Silva; Kumar Sangakkara; Mahela Jayawardene; Dinesh Chandimal (wk); Kithuruwan Vithanage; Rangana Herath; Dilruwan Perera; Ajantha Mendis; Suranga Lakmal; Shaminda Eranga; Dhammika Prasad; Chanaka Welagedara; Niroshan Dickwella	Hashim Amla (c); Alviro Petersen; Dean Elgar; Faf du Plessis; AB de Villiers (vc & wk); JP Duminy; Stiaan van Zyl; Wayne Parnell; Vernon Philander; Morne Morkel; Dale Steyn; Imran Tahir; Kyle Abbott; Quinton de Kock (wk); Dane Piedt	Angelo Mathews (c); Lahiru Thirimanne (vc); Tillakaratne Dilshan; Kusal Perera (wk); Kumar Sangakkara (wk); Mahela Jayawardene; Kithuruwan Vithanage; Ashan Priyanjan; Upul Tharanga; Sachithra Senanayake; Rangana Herath; Ajantha Mendis; Thisara Perera; Nuwan Kulasekara; Lasith Malinga; Suranga Lakmal; Dilruwan Perera	AB de Villiers (c & wk); Hashim Amla; Quinton de Kock (wk); Jacques Kallis; JP Duminy; David Miller; Wayne Parnell; Ryan McLaren; Dale Steyn; Morne Morkel; Imran Tahir; Vernon Philander; Faf du Plessis; Aaron Phangiso; Beuran Hendricks

== Tour matches ==
=== One-day: Sri Lanka Board President's XI v South Africans ===
3 July 2014
9:30
Scorecard

Sri Lanka Board President's XI; 189 (39.2 overs)	v	South Africans; 297/9 (50 overs)
Suraj Randiv 53 (51); Morné Morkel 3/29 (7 overs)		Hashim Amla 104 (79); Lahiru Gamage 3/36 (10 overs)

South Africans won by 108 runs
Tyronne Fernando Stadium, Moratuwa
Umpires: Rohitha Kottahachchi (SL) and RMPJ Rambukwella (SL)

- Sri Lanka Board President's XI won the toss and elected to field.

== ODI series ==
=== 1st ODI ===
6 July 2014
Scorecard

South Africa; 304/5 (50 overs)	v	Sri Lanka; 229 (40.3 overs)
Hashim Amla 109 (130); Ajantha Mendis 3/61 (10 overs)		Kumar Sangakkara 88 (84); Imran Tahir 3/50 (7overs)

South Africa won by 75 runs
R. Premadasa Stadium, Colombo
Umpires: Steve Davis (Aus) and Ranmore Martinesz (SL)
Player of the match: Hashim Amla (SA)

- South Africa won the toss and elected to bat.

=== 2nd ODI ===
9 July 2014
Scorecard

Sri Lanka; 267 (49.2 overs)	v	South Africa; 180 (38.1 overs)
Tillakaratne Dilshan 86 (90); Ryan McLaren 4/48 (10 overs)		Hashim Amla 101 (102); Lasith Malinga 4/24 (6 overs)

Sri Lanka won by 87 runs
Pallekele International Cricket Stadium, Pallekele
Umpires: Nigel Llong (Eng) and Ruchira Palliyaguru (SL)
Player of the match: Tillakaratne Dilshan (SL)

- Sri Lanka won toss and elected to bat.

=== 3rd ODI ===
12 July 2014
Scorecard

South Africa; 339/5 (50 overs)	v	Sri Lanka; 257 (44.3 overs)
Quinton de Kock 128 (127); Rangana Herath 2/48 (10 overs)		Angelo Mathews 58 (81); Ryan McLaren 3/37 (8 overs)

South Africa won by 82 runs
Mahinda Rajapaksa International Cricket Stadium, Hambantota
Umpires: Steve Davis (Aus) and Ranmore Martinesz (SL)
Player of the match: AB de Villiers (SA)

- South Africa won the toss and elected to bat.
- Jacques Kallis (SA), played his final ODI

== Test series ==
=== 1st Test ===
16–20 July
Scorecard

South Africa	v	Sri Lanka
455/9d (166.2 overs); Dean Elgar 103 (187); Dilruwan Perera 4/162 (53.2 Overs)		292 (104.5 overs); Angelo Mathews 89 (182); Dale Steyn 5/54 (23 overs)
206/6d (50.2 overs); AB de Villiers 51 (58); Dilruwan Perera 4/79 (19.2 overs)		216 (71.3 overs); Kumar Sangakkara 76 (145); Morne Morkel 4/29 (13.3 overs)

South Africa won by 153 runs
Galle International Stadium, Galle
Umpires: Billy Bowden (NZ) and Richard Kettleborough (Eng)
Player of the match: Dale Steyn (SA)

- South Africa won the toss and elected to bat.
- This is the first match for Hashim Amla as Test captain.
- Dean Elgar became the first South African opener to score century in Sri Lanka.
- South Africa's first Test victory in Sri Lanka since 2000.

=== 2nd Test ===
24–28 July
Scorecard

Sri Lanka	v	South Africa
421 (121.4 overs); Mahela Jayawardene 165; Vernon Philander 2/52 (21.4 overs)		282 (134.5 overs); Hashim Amla 139* (372); Dilruwan Perera 4/66 (41 overs)
229/8d (53.4 overs); Kumar Sangakkara 72 (90); Morne Morkel 4/45 (9.4 overs)		159/8 (111 overs); Quinton de Kock 37 (96); Rangana Herath 5/40 (45 overs)

Match Drawn
Sinhalese Sports Club Ground, Colombo
Umpires: Richard Kettleborough (Eng) and Nigel Llong (Eng)
Player of the match: Mahela Jayawardene (SL)

- Sri Lanka won the toss and elected to bat.
- Rain affected the first and third session of Day 5
- Niroshan Dickwella (SL) made his Test debut.
- Hashim Amla scored the first century by a South Africa captain in Sri Lanka.
- South Africa's 1st test series victory in Sri Lanka since 1993
