= Sri Lankan cricket team in South Africa in 2016–17 =

International cricket tour

	South Africa	Sri Lanka
- Dates: 18 December 2016 – 10 February 2017
Captains	Faf du Plessis (Tests); Farhaan Behardien (T20Is); AB de Villiers (ODIs)	Angelo Mathews (Tests, 1st & 2nd T20Is); Dinesh Chandimal (3rd T20I); Upul Tharanga (ODIs)

Test series
- Result: South Africa won the 3-match series 3–0
Most runs	Dean Elgar (308)	Angelo Mathews (178)
Most wickets	Kagiso Rabada (19)	Suranga Lakmal (12)
- Player of the series: Dean Elgar (SA)

One Day International series
- Results: South Africa won the 5-match series 5–0
Most runs	Faf du Plessis (410)	Niroshan Dickwella (197)
Most wickets	Wayne Parnell (11)	Suranga Lakmal (5)
- Player of the series: Faf du Plessis (SA)

Twenty20 International series
- Results: Sri Lanka won the 3-match series 2–1
Most runs	Farhaan Behardien (64)	Niroshan Dickwella (134)
Most wickets	Lungi Ngidi (6); Imran Tahir (6)	Lakshan Sandakan (5); Nuwan Kulasekara (5)
- Player of the series: Niroshan Dickwella (SL)

Sri Lankan national cricket team toured South Africa from 18 December 2016 to 10 February 2017. The tour consisted of three Tests, five One Day Internationals (ODIs) and three Twenty20 Internationals (T20Is). After the initial tour schedule was announced, the dates were moved slightly to accommodate South Africa's domestic T20 tournament.

On 12 December 2016 AB de Villiers stood down as South Africa's Test captain. He named his stand-in Faf du Plessis as replacement, a move that was confirmed by Cricket South Africa (CSA). Immediately prior to this series, du Plessis was found guilty of ball tampering during the second Test against Australia that took place in November 2016. He appealed the charge, but it was rejected. He lost his match fee from the second Test, but escaped the more serious charge of a one-match ban. De Villiers returned to team when he was named captain for the ODI fixtures. He also played in the third and final T20I match, with Farhaan Behardien retained as captain.

South Africa won the Test series 3–0. Sri Lanka won the T20I series 2–1, their first ever series win in any format in South Africa. South Africa won the ODI series 5–0 and moved to the number one position in the ICC ODI Championship.

== Squads ==
Tests		ODIs		T20Is	
South Africa	Sri Lanka	South Africa	Sri Lanka	South Africa	Sri Lanka
Faf du Plessis (c); Kyle Abbott; Hashim Amla; Temba Bavuma; Stephen Cook; Theunis de Bruyn; Quinton de Kock (wk); JP Duminy; Dean Elgar; Keshav Maharaj; Duanne Olivier; Wayne Parnell; Vernon Philander; Kagiso Rabada	Angelo Mathews (c); Dinesh Chandimal (vc); Dushmantha Chameera; Dhananjaya de Silva; Rangana Herath; Dimuth Karunaratne; Lahiru Kumara; Suranga Lakmal; Kusal Mendis; Dilruwan Perera; Kusal Perera; Nuwan Pradeep; Vikum Sanjaya; Kaushal Silva; Upul Tharanga	AB de Villiers (c); Hashim Amla; Farhaan Behardien; Quinton de Kock; JP Duminy; Faf du Plessis; Imran Tahir; ~~David Miller~~; Chris Morris; Wayne Parnell; ~~Lungi Ngidi~~; Andile Phehlukwayo; Dwaine Pretorius; Kagiso Rabada; Tabraiz Shamsi	Upul Tharanga (c); Dinesh Chandimal; Chaturanga de Silva; Dhananjaya de Silva; ~~Thikshila de Silva~~; Niroshan Dickwella; Asela Gunaratne; Nuwan Kulasekara; Lahiru Kumara; Suranga Lakmal; Lahiru Madushanka; Kusal Mendis; Sachith Pathirana; ~~Seekkuge Prasanna~~; Lakshan Sandakan; Vikum Sanjaya; ~~Isuru Udana~~; Jeffrey Vandersay; Sandun Weerakkody	Farhaan Behardien (c); Theunis de Bruyn; AB de Villiers; Reeza Hendricks; Imran Tahir; Heino Kuhn; David Miller; Mangaliso Mosehle; Lungi Ngidi; Wayne Parnell; Dane Paterson; Aaron Phangiso; Andile Phehlukwayo; JJ Smuts	~~Angelo Mathews~~ (c); Dinesh Chandimal (vc); Dhananjaya de Silva; Thikshila de Silva; Niroshan Dickwella; Asela Gunaratne; ~~Danushka Gunathilaka~~; Nuwan Kulasekara; Suranga Lakmal; Kusal Mendis; Sachith Pathirana; ~~Nuwan Pradeep~~; Seekkuge Prasanna; Lakshan Sandakan; Upul Tharanga; Isuru Udana

Duanne Olivier was added to South Africa's squad following the second Test to replace Kyle Abbott, who earlier had quit international cricket to sign for the English team Hampshire as a Kolpak player. Nuwan Pradeep fractured his hand in the first T20I match and was ruled out of the rest of the tour. Following the second T20I, Angelo Mathews, Nuwan Pradeep and Danushka Gunathilaka all left Sri Lanka's squad. Pradeep and Gunathilaka suffered injuries, while Mathews left on personal grounds. Dinesh Chandimal was named the captain of the side in Mathews' absence. Lungi Ngidi was ruled out of the ODI series because of an abdominal injury. On the day before the first ODI, Sri Lanka dropped Isuru Udana, Thikshila de Silva and Seekkuge Prasanna replacing them with Lahiru Kumara, Vikum Sanjaya and Jeffrey Vandersay. David Miller was ruled out of the final three ODI matches after suffering a finger injury.

== Tour match ==
=== Three-day match: South African Invitation XI v Sri Lankans ===
18–20 December 2016
Scorecard

Sri Lankans (Sri Lanka)	v	(South Africa) South African Invitation XI
373 (98.5 overs); Kaushal Silva 80 (145); Duanne Olivier 4/54 (20 overs)		289 (69.5 overs); Leus du Plooy 142 (159); Lahiru Kumara 3/36 (9 overs)
212/5 (47.1 overs); Dinesh Chandimal 60 (52); Bjorn Fortuin 2/36 (7.1 overs)

Match drawn
Senwes Park, Potchefstroom
Umpires: Shaun George (SA) and Bongani Jele (SA)

- Sri Lankans won the toss and elected to bat.

== Test series ==
=== 1st Test ===
26–30 December 2016
Scorecard

South Africa	v	Sri Lanka
286 (98.5 overs); JP Duminy 63 (95); Suranga Lakmal 5/63 (27 overs)		205 (64.5 overs); Dhananjaya de Silva 43 (70); Vernon Philander 5/45 (20 overs)
406/6d (90.5 overs); Stephen Cook 117 (178); Dhananjaya de Silva 2/91 (15 overs)		281 (96.3 overs); Angelo Mathews 59 (120); Kagiso Rabada 3/77 (21 overs)

South Africa won by 206 runs
St George's Park, Port Elizabeth
Umpires: Aleem Dar (Pak) and Bruce Oxenford (Aus)
Player of the match: Stephen Cook (SA)

- South Africa won the toss and elected to bat.
- Lightning stopped play in the morning session on day 3 with lunch being taken.
- Suranga Lakmal (SL) took his first five-wicket haul in Tests.
- Hashim Amla's (SA) dismissal by Nuwan Pradeep (SL) in South Africa's second innings was the 10,000th lbw in Test cricket.

=== 2nd Test ===
2–6 January 2017
Scorecard

South Africa	v	Sri Lanka
392 (116 overs); Dean Elgar 129 (230); Lahiru Kumara 6/122 (25 overs)		110 (43 overs); Upul Tharanga 26* (40); Vernon Philander 4/27 (12 overs)
224/7d (51.5 overs); Dean Elgar 55 (91); Suranga Lakmal 4/69 (19.5 overs)		224 (62 overs); Angelo Mathews 49 (82); Kagiso Rabada 6/55 (17 overs)

South Africa won by 282 runs
Newlands Cricket Ground, Cape Town
Umpires: Aleem Dar (Pak) and Rod Tucker (Aus)
Player of the match: Kagiso Rabada (SA)

- Sri Lanka won the toss and elected to field.
- Rod Tucker (Aus) stood in his 50th Test as an umpire.
- Quinton de Kock (SA) passed 1,000 runs in Tests and became the first South African wicket-keeper to score a Test century against Sri Lanka.
- Lahiru Kumara (SL) took his first five wicket haul in Tests.
- Kagiso Rabada (SA) took his 50th Test wicket.
- Vernon Philander (SA) took his 150th Test wicket.

=== 3rd Test ===
12–16 January 2017
Scorecard

South Africa	v	Sri Lanka
426 (124.1 overs); JP Duminy 155 (221); Nuwan Pradeep 4/78 (27 overs)		131 (45.4 overs); Kusal Mendis 41 (58); Vernon Philander 3/28 (14 overs)
		177 (42.3 overs) (f/o); Dimuth Karunaratne 50 (78); Wayne Parnell 4/51 (10.3 overs)

South Africa won by an innings and 118 runs
Wanderers Stadium, Johannesburg
Umpires: Bruce Oxenford (Aus) and Rod Tucker (Aus)
Player of the match: JP Duminy (SA)

- South Africa won the toss and elected to bat.
- Bad light stopped play on day 2.
- Duanne Olivier (SA) made his Test debut.
- Hashim Amla (SA) played in his 100th Test and became the eighth batsman to score a century in his 100th Test.
- Hashim Amla and JP Duminy's 292-runs partnership is South Africa's highest ever against Sri Lanka in Tests.
- Sri Lanka lost 16 wickets on the third day, the most they have lost in a single day in Tests.

== T20I series ==
=== 1st T20I ===
20 January 2017
Scorecard

South Africa; 126/5 (10 overs)	v	Sri Lanka; 107/6 (10 overs)
David Miller 40 (18); Nuwan Kulasekara 2/27 (2 overs)		Niroshan Dickwella 43 (19); Lungi Ngidi 2/12 (2 overs)

South Africa won by 19 runs
Centurion Park, Centurion
Umpires: Shaun George (SA) and Adrian Holdstock (SA)
Player of the match: Lungi Ngidi (SA)

- Sri Lanka won the toss and elected to field.
- Rain reduced the match to 10 overs per-side.
- Theunis de Bruyn, Mangaliso Mosehle, Lungi Ngidi, Andile Phehlukwayo, JJ Smuts (SA) and Thikshila de Silva (SL) all made their T20I debuts.

=== 2nd T20I ===
22 January 2017
Scorecard

South Africa; 113 (19.3 overs)	v	Sri Lanka; 119/7 (19.4 overs)
Heino Kuhn 29 (20); Lakshan Sandakan 4/23 (4 overs)		Angelo Mathews 54* (50); Lungi Ngidi 4/19 (4 overs)

Sri Lanka won by 3 wickets
Wanderers Stadium, Johannesburg
Umpires: Adrian Holdstock (SA) and Bongani Jele (SA)
Player of the match: Angelo Mathews (SL)

- South Africa won the toss and elected to bat.
- Bongani Jele (SA) stood in his first T20I as an umpire.
- Lakshan Sandakan (SL) made his T20I debut and took a wicket with his first delivery.

=== 3rd T20I ===
25 January 2017
Scorecard

South Africa; 169/5 (20 overs)	v	Sri Lanka; 170/5 (19.5 overs)
AB de Villiers 63 (44); Seekkuge Prasanna 1/21 (3 overs)		Niroshan Dickwella 68 (51); Imran Tahir 3/18 (4 overs)

Sri Lanka won by 5 wickets
Newlands Cricket Ground, Cape Town
Umpires: Shaun George (SA) and Bongani Jele (SA)
Player of the match: Niroshan Dickwella (SL)

- South Africa won the toss and elected to bat.
- Dane Paterson (SA) made his T20I debut.

== ODI series ==
=== 1st ODI ===
28 January 2017
Scorecard

Sri Lanka; 181 (48.3 overs)	v	South Africa; 185/2 (34.2 overs)
Kusal Mendis 62 (94); Imran Tahir 3/26 (10 overs)		Hashim Amla 57 (71); Asela Gunaratne 1/19 (5 overs)

South Africa won by 8 wickets
St George's Park, Port Elizabeth
Umpires: Bongani Jele (SA) and Richard Kettleborough (Eng)
Player of the match: Imran Tahir (SA)

- South Africa won the toss and elected to field.
- Sandun Weerakkody (SL) made his ODI debut.

=== 2nd ODI ===
1 February 2017
Scorecard

South Africa; 307/6 (50 overs)	v	Sri Lanka; 186 (35.5 overs)
David Miller 117* (98); Suranga Lakmal 2/54 (7 overs)		Dinesh Chandimal 36 (46); Imran Tahir 2/26 (8.5 overs)

South Africa won by 121 runs
Kingsmead Cricket Ground, Durban
Umpires: Shaun George (SA) and Richard Illingworth (Eng)
Player of the match: Faf du Plessis (SA)

- Sri Lanka won the toss and elected to field.

=== 3rd ODI ===
4 February 2017
Scorecard

Sri Lanka; 163 (39.2 overs)	v	South Africa; 164/3 (32 overs)
Niroshan Dickwella 74 (80); Dwaine Pretorius 3/19 (7 overs)		AB de Villiers 60* (61); Lahiru Madushanka 1/15 (4 overs)

South Africa won by 7 wickets
Wanderers Stadium, Johannesburg
Umpires: Adrian Holdstock (SA) and Richard Kettleborough (Eng)
Player of the match: Dwaine Pretorius (SA)

- South Africa won the toss and elected to field.
- Lahiru Kumara and Lahiru Madushanka (SL) both made their ODI debuts.
- Faf du Plessis (SA) played in his 100th ODI.
- Play was delayed for one hour during Sri Lanka's innings due to a swarm of bees in the ground, but no overs were lost.
- This was South Africa's twelfth consecutive victory in ODIs at home, beating their previous record of eleven set in the 1996–97 season.

=== 4th ODI ===
7 February 2017
Scorecard

South Africa; 367/5 (50 overs)	v	Sri Lanka; 327 (48.1 overs)
Faf du Plessis 185 (141); Sachith Pathirana 2/55 (10 overs)		Upul Tharanga 119 (90); Wayne Parnell 4/58 (9.1 overs)

South Africa won by 40 runs
Newlands Cricket Ground, Cape Town
Umpires: Adrian Holdstock (SA) and Richard Illingworth (Eng)
Player of the match: Faf du Plessis (SA)

- South Africa won the toss and elected to bat.
- Faf du Plessis made the second-highest score by a batsman for South Africa in an ODI.
- This was South Africa's thirteenth consecutive victory in ODIs at home, the most for any team.

=== 5th ODI ===
10 February 2017
Scorecard

South Africa; 384/6 (50 overs)	v	Sri Lanka; 296/8 (50 overs)
Hashim Amla 154 (134); Suranga Lakmal 3/71 (10 overs)		Asela Gunaratne 114* (117); Chris Morris 4/31 (10 overs)

South Africa won by 88 runs
Centurion Park, Centurion
Umpires: Shaun George (SA) and Richard Kettleborough (Eng)
Player of the match: Hashim Amla (SA)

- Sri Lanka won the toss and elected to field.
- Hashim Amla (SA) made his 50th international hundred, achieving this in the fewest innings by any player (348).
- South Africa set a new record for the most scores above 350 in ODIs (24).
- South Africa's total is their highest against Sri Lanka in ODIs, beating their previous best set in the 4th ODI of this series.
- Asela Gunaratne (SL) made his first century in an ODI.
