= List of international cricket centuries by Hashim Amla =

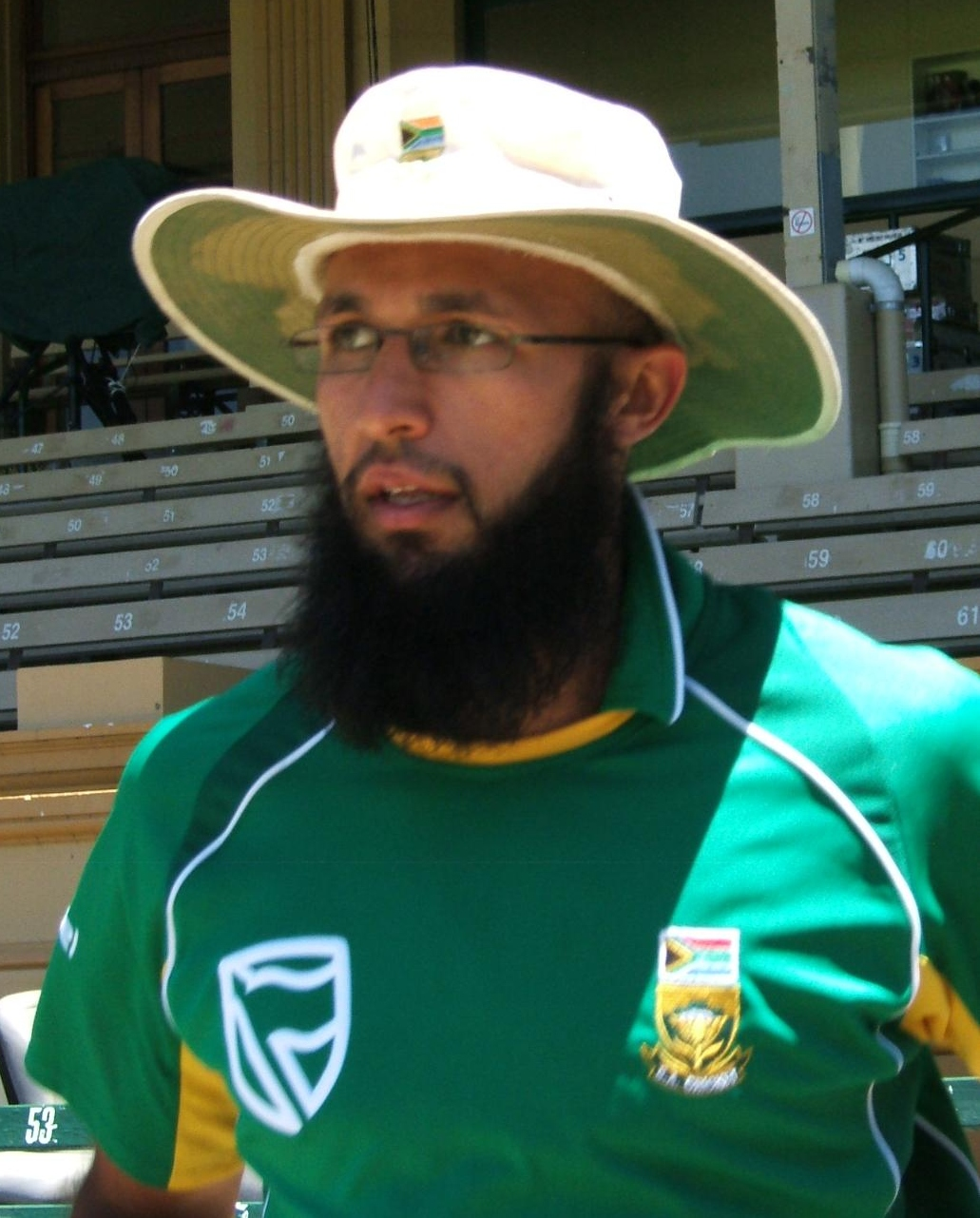
Hashim Amla has scored 55 centuries for South Africa.

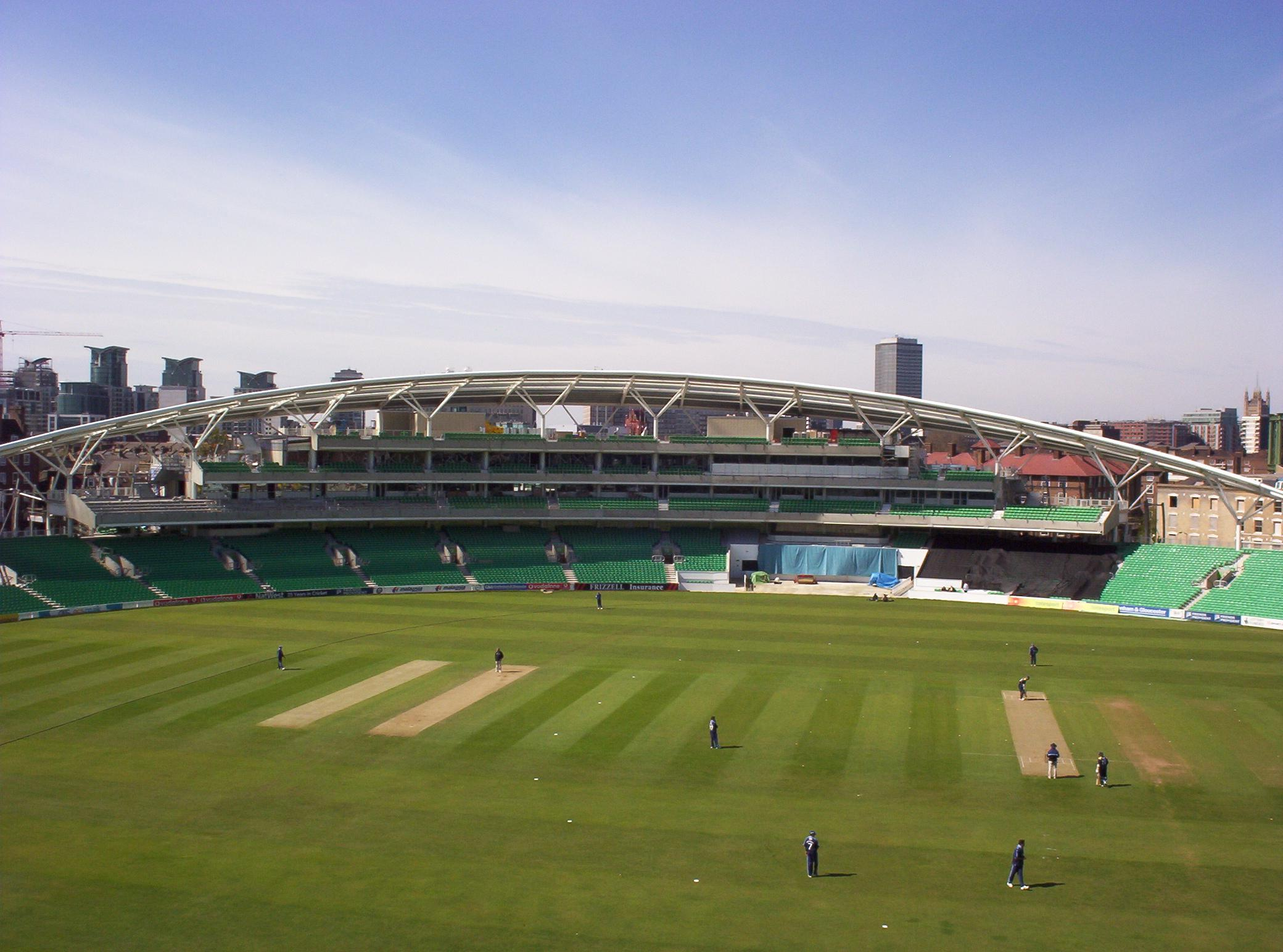
Amla made his highest Test score at The Oval.

Hashim Amla is a retired cricketer who represented the South Africa national cricket team for 15 years. He has scored centuries (100 or more runs in a single innings) in Test and One Day International (ODI) matches on 28 and 27 occasions respectively. Former England captain Geoffrey Boycott once said about him that, "he bats in a way that gives very little hope for the bowlers" and "he plays the same way at the start of his innings as he does at the end of it".

Amla made his Test debut against India at Eden Gardens, Kolkata, in 2004. His first century came two years later against New Zealand at the Newlands Cricket Ground, Cape Town. His score of 311 not out, against England at The Oval, London, in 2012, was the first triple century by a South African batsman in Test cricket. Amla has scored Test centuries at sixteen cricket grounds, including ten at venues outside South Africa. In Tests, he has scored centuries against eight different opponents, and has the most centuries (six) against England. As of January 2019, Amla has the second-highest number of centuries for South Africa in Tests. (Note: Jacques Kallis leads the list with 45 centuries.)

Amla made his ODI debut in 2008 against Bangladesh at the Chittagong Divisional Stadium, Chittagong. His first century came in the same year against the same team at the Willowmoore Park, Benoni. His highest ODI score of 159 was made against Ireland at the Manuka Oval, Canberra in 2015. His 27 centuries in the format is a South African record. Amla has played 38 Twenty20 International (T20I) matches without scoring a century; his highest score in the format is 97 not out. As of January 2019, Amla has the sixth-highest number of centuries across all formats in international cricket.

== Key ==
- * – Remained not out
- † – Man of the match
- ‡ – Captain of South Africa in that match
- (D/L) – The result of the match was based upon the Duckworth–Lewis method

== Test centuries ==
Test centuries scored by Amla
No.	Score	Against	Pos.	Inn.	Test	Venue	H/A/N	Date	Result	Ref
1	149	New Zealand	3	2	2/3	Newlands Cricket Ground, Cape Town	Home	27 April 2006	Drawn	
2	176*	New Zealand	3	3	1/2	New Wanderers Stadium, Johannesburg	Home	8 November 2007	Won	
3	103	New Zealand	3	2	2/2	SuperSport Park, Centurion	Home	16 November 2007	Won	
4	159	India	3	1	1/3	M. A. Chidambaram Stadium, Chennai	Away	26 March 2008	Drawn	
5	104*	England	3	3	1/4	Lord's Cricket Ground, London	Away	10 July 2008	Drawn	
6	112	Bangladesh	3	1	1/2	Chevrolet Park, Bloemfontein	Home	19 November 2008	Won	
7	100	England	4	3	1/4	SuperSport Park, Centurion	Home	16 December 2009	Drawn	
8	253* †	India	3	1	1/2	VCA Stadium, Nagpur	Away	6 February 2010	Won	
9	114 †	India	3	1	2/2	Eden Gardens, Kolkata	Away	14 February 2010	Lost	
10	123* †	India	3	3	2/2	Eden Gardens, Kolkata	Away	14 February 2010	Lost	
11	118*	Pakistan	3	3	1/2	DSC Cricket Stadium, Dubai	Neutral	12 November 2010	Drawn	
12	140	India	3	2	1/2	SuperSport Park, Centurion	Home	16 December 2010	Won	
13	112	Australia	3	4	1/2	Newlands Cricket Ground, Cape Town	Home	9 November 2011	Won	
14	105	Australia	3	3	2/2	New Wanderers Stadium, Johannesburg	Home	17 November 2011	Lost	
15	311* †	England	3	2	1/3	The Oval, London	Away	19 July 2012	Won	
16	121	England	3	3	3/3	Lord's Cricket Ground, London	Away	16 August 2012	Won	
17	104	Australia	3	1	1/3	The Gabba, Brisbane	Away	9 November 2012	Drawn	
18	196 †	Australia	2	2	3/3	WACA Ground, Perth	Away	30 November 2012	Won	
19	110	New Zealand	2	2	2/2	St George's Park, Port Elizabeth	Home	11 January 2013	Won	
20	118	Pakistan	3	1	1/2	Sheikh Zayed Stadium, Abu Dhabi	Neutral	14 October 2013	Lost	
21	127*	Australia	5	1	2/3	St George's Park, Port Elizabeth	Home	20 February 2014	Won	
22	139* ‡	Sri Lanka	4	1	2/2	Sinhalese Sports Club Ground, Colombo	Away	24 July 2014	Drawn	
23	208 † ‡	West Indies	4	1	1/3	SuperSport Park, Centurion	Home	17 December 2014	Won	
24	201 ‡	England	3	2	2/4	Newlands Cricket Ground, Cape Town	Home	5 January 2016	Drawn	
25	109	England	3	1	4/4	SuperSport Park, Centurion	Home	22 January 2016	Won	
26	134	Sri Lanka	3	1	3/3	New Wanderers Stadium, Johannesburg	Home	12 January 2017	Won	
27	137	Bangladesh	3	1	1/2	Senwes Park, Potchefstroom	Home	28 September 2017	Won	
28	132	Bangladesh	3	1	2/2	Mangaung Oval, Bloemfontein	Home	6 October 2017	Won	

== One Day International cricket centuries ==
ODI centuries scored by Amla
No.	Score	Against	Pos.	Inn.	S/R	Venue	H/A/N	Date	Result	Ref
1	140 †	Bangladesh	1	1	103.70	Willowmoore Park, Benoni	Home	9 November 2008	Won	
2	102 †	West Indies	1	1	93.57	Sir Vivian Richards Stadium, Antigua	Away	22 May 2010	Won (D/L)	
3	129 †	West Indies	2	2	112.17	Windsor Park, Roseau	Away	30 May 2010	Won	
4	110	Zimbabwe	1	1	114.58	Chevrolet Park, Bloemfontein	Home	15 October 2010	Won	
5	110	Zimbabwe	1	2	106.79	Senwes Park, Potchefstroom	Home	17 October 2010	Won	
6	119* †	Pakistan	1	1	94.44	DSC Cricket Stadium, Dubai	Neutral	2 November 2010	Won	
7	116* †	India	2	1	87.87	SuperSport Park, Centurion	Home	23 January 2011	Won (D/L)	
8	113	Netherlands	1	1	86.92	Punjab Cricket Association Stadium, Mohali	Neutral	3 March 2011	Won	
9	112	Sri Lanka	1	1	87.50	Boland Bank Park, Paarl	Home	11 January 2012	Won	
10	150 †	England	2	1	120.96	Rose Bowl, Southampton	Away	28 August 2012	Won	
11	122 † (Note: Amla shared the man of the match award with AB de Villiers.)	Pakistan	2	1	107.96	New Wanderers Stadium, Johannesburg	Home	17 March 2013	Won	
12	100	India	2	1	85.47	Kingsmead Cricket Ground, Durban	Home	8 December 2013	Won	
13	109 †	Sri Lanka	1	1	83.84	R Premadasa Stadium, Colombo	Away	6 July 2014	Won	
14	101	Sri Lanka	1	2	99.01	Pallekele International Cricket Stadium, Kandy	Away	9 July 2014	Lost	
15	122*†	Zimbabwe	2	1	92.42	Queens Sports Club, Bulawayo	Away	17 August 2014	Won	
16	119†	New Zealand	1	1	88.14	Bay Oval, Mount Maunganui	Away	24 October 2014	Won	
17	102	Australia	1	2	88.69	Manuka Oval, Canberra	Away	19 November 2014	Lost	
18	153*	West Indies	1	1	107.74	New Wanderers Stadium, Johannesburg	Home	18 January 2015	Won	
19	133 ‡	West Indies	2	1	126.66	SuperSport Park, Centurion	Home	28 January 2015	Won	
20	159 †	Ireland	1	1	125.19	Manuka Oval, Canberra	Neutral	3 March 2015	Won	
21	124 †	New Zealand	2	1	98.41	SuperSport Park, Centurion	Home	19 August 2015	Won	
22	127	England	2	2	97.69	SuperSport Park, Centurion	Home	9 February 2016	Won	
23	110	West Indies	1	1	111.11	Warner Park, Basseterre	Away	15 June 2016	Won	
24	154 †	Sri Lanka	2	1	114.92	SuperSport Park, Centurion	Home	10 February 2017	Won	
25	103	Sri Lanka	2	1	89.57	Kennington Oval, London	Neutral	3 June 2017	Won	
26	110*	Bangladesh	2	2	98.21	De Beers Diamond Oval, Kimberley	Home	15 October 2017	Won	
27	108*	Pakistan	1	1	90.00	St George's Park, Port Elizabeth	Home	19 January 2019	Lost	
