= Upul Tharanga =

Sri Lankan cricketer

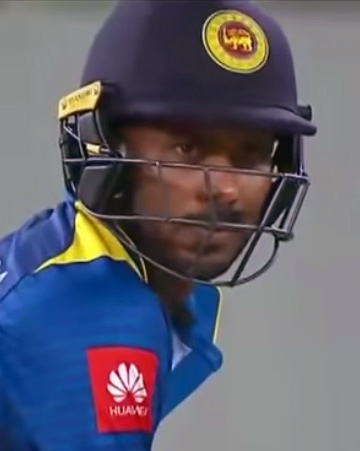
- Upul Tharanga, October 2017

Personal information
- Full name: Warushavithana Upul Tharanga
- Born: 2 February 1985 (age 41); Balapitiya, Sri Lanka
- Nickname: Upula
- Height: 5 ft 11 in (1.80 m)
- Batting: Left-handed
- Role: Batsman

International information
- National side: Sri Lanka (2005–2019)
- Test debut (cap 103): 18 December 2005 v India
- Last Test: 12 August 2017 v India
- ODI debut (cap 125): 2 August 2005 v West Indies
- Last ODI: 16 March 2019 v South Africa
- ODI shirt no.: 44
- T20I debut (cap 11): 15 June 2006 v England
- Last T20I: 16 March 2018 v Bangladesh
- T20I shirt no.: 44

Domestic team information
- Years: Team
- 2000/01: Singha Sports Club
- 2003–present: Nondescripts Cricket Club
- 2007–present: Ruhuna
- 2014: Kandurata Maroons
- 2017: Sylhet Sixers
- 2018–2019: Dhaka Dynamites
- 2020: Lalitpur Patriots
- 2020: Dambulla Viiking

Career statistics
Competition	Test	ODI	FC	LA
Matches	31	235	157	404
Runs scored	1,754	6,951	9,755	12,581
Batting average	31.89	33.74	38.71	34.65
100s/50s	3/8	15/37	24/40	29/70
Top score	165	174*	265*	174*
Catches/stumpings	24/0	50/0	114/1	117/2
Medal record
Men's Cricket
Representing Sri Lanka
ICC Cricket World Cup
Runner-up	2007 West-Indies
Runner-up	2011 India–Bangladesh–Sri Lanka
Asian Games
Gold medal – first place	2014 Incheon
- Source: ESPNCricinfo, 11 March 2023

Warushavithana Upul Tharanga (born 2 February 1985), commonly known as Upul Tharanga (Sinhala: උපුල් තරංග) is a former professional Sri Lankan cricketer. A former limited-overs captain, Tharanga played all formats of the game. He was a left-handed opening batsman and an occasional wicket-keeper. On 23 February 2021, Upul announced his retirement from international cricket. He is the current national chief selector of both Sri Lanka men's and women's cricket teams.

== Early and domestic career ==
Born on 2 February 1985 as the youngest of the family, Tharanga was born at Balapitiya General Hospital. His father Warushavithanage Bhadrasoma was a fish market dealer. His mother R.J Padma is a housewife and Tharanga has one elder brother Nuwan Tharanga and one elder sister Kumesha Manori. Though his brother used to enjoy swimming, Tharanga chose cricket at the younger age. He first attended Devananda College, Ambalangoda, and passed grade 5 scholarship in 1995. Since then, Tharanga had his secondary education at Dharmasoka College, Ambalangoda until ordinary level. However, with many cricket tours, he could not complete education towards advanced level. He started his cricket career as a teenager at his school.

Having played for Nondescripts since the age of 15, he played for Sri Lanka's under-15, under-17 and under-19 squads. He had a successful under-19 World Cup in 2004 with successful innings of 117 and 61 in successive games. He was sent by the Sri Lankan cricketing board to play league cricket for Loughton Cricket Club in Essex.

Tharanga's Sri Lankan call-up occurred in July 2005 when Sri Lanka was devastated, and after his family home was washed away by the 2004 Tsunami tragedy, where only the foundation of the house was left. His equipment, which was also washed away, was replaced by Kumar Sangakkara. Tharanga graduated to the "A" team and in July he was selected for the full squad.

In March 2018, he was named in Galle's squad for the 2017–18 Super Four Provincial Tournament. The following month, he was also named as the captain of Galle's squad for the 2018 Super Provincial One Day Tournament. He was the leading run-scorer in the tournament, with 396 runs in six matches.

In August 2018, he was named as Colombo's vice-captain for the 2018 SLC T20 League. In the opening match of the tournament, he scored 124 not out, with Colombo going on to beat Galle by 90 runs. He was the leading run-scorer for the tournament, finishing with 414 runs in six matches, including another unbeaten century in the final.

In March 2019, he was named in Colombo's squad for the 2019 Super Provincial One Day Tournament. In October 2020, he was drafted by the Dambulla Hawks for the inaugural edition of the Lanka Premier League. In November 2021, he was selected to play for the Jaffna Kings following the players' draft for the 2021 Lanka Premier League.

== International career ==
On the 2006 tour of England he really began to develop, particularly in the one-day game, scoring over 300 runs in Sri Lanka's 5–0 whitewash of the hosts. In addition, Tharanga was also well known for taking part in a record-breaking first wicket partnership with Sanath Jayasuriya in the final match of this series. He finished off with 109 off 102 balls, and played a pivotal role in completing the whitewash against England in England for the first time.

Tharanga lost his form in the 2007 World Cup scoring only one half century (against New Zealand) he then continued his poor run of form in the home series against England in 2007 where he failed to contribute and often fell before the 10th over often resulting in a middle-order collapse. Subsequently, he lost his ODI place to Malinda Warnapura and his test place to Michael Vandort but he remained within the squad.

However, in the 2011 World Cup, he is back to performing remarkably. In the quarter-final game against England, his partnership with Tillakaratne Dilshan, wrapped up the game, each acquiring centuries. His strong form returned him to the opening position in the strong Sri-Lankan batting line up. He also came in for special praise from Jayasuriya, one of the legends of cricket, saying that he could be the next captain of the Sri Lankan cricket team.

=== Through ranks ===
Tharanga is the second batsman in the world who was involved with seven 200+ partnerships in ODI cricket after Ricky Ponting.

On 2 July 2013, Upul Tharanga scored the third highest ODI score of 174* by a Sri Lankan only behind Sanath Jayasuriya who scored 189 against India and Pathum Nissanka's 210 against Afghanistan. With that innings he became the 9th Sri Lankan player to pass 5000 runs margin. Despite his low match participation, he earned 15 centuries and 12 man of the match titles for his name throughout his international career.

Tharanga became the fastest Sri Lankan to reach 4000 ODI runs, reached by 119 innings.

=== Test career ===
After 8 years of scarcity for Test cricket, Tharanga was called to the third Test match against Pakistan on 3 July 2015. He was used as the replacement for Kumar Sangakkara who did play for first two Tests, but not to third Test at Kandy, due to his retirement consideration during India tour. He scored 46 runs in the first innings and 48 in the second innings. However, Sri Lanka lost the series by 2–1.

Tharanga holds the record of waiting for Maximum number of days between two test centuries. Since World War-2 it is the longest gaps between Test centuries by a player.

=== Limited over comeback ===
Tharanga, who had a long ODI scarcity, was included to the ODI squad against Pakistan. Due to the retirement of Kumar Sangakkara, the number three position was vacant and Sri Lanka cricket selected Tharanga for the crucial number three position in ODIs.

=== Captaincy ===
Due to multiple injuries of regular captain Angelo Mathews, Tharanga was selected as Sri Lankan captain, to lead them in ODI tri series in Zimbabwe on 5 November 2016. On 14 November 2016, he led Sri Lankan team for the first time in an ODI against Zimbabwe, which was won comfortably by 8 wickets. At the end, Sri Lanka won the tri-series by defeating the hosts Zimbabwe in the final by 6 wickets. Tharanga was also the 19th captain for Sri Lanka in ODIs.

Tharanga was selected again as the ODI captain for the South Africa series, when Mathews was not available after he sustained an injury during the second T20I. However, South Africa outplayed in all 5 ODIs and whitewashed Sri Lanka for the first time.

On 9 February 2017, Tharanga was named as the T20I captain for Sri Lanka during the 3-T20I tour for Australia, where stand-in captain Dinesh Chandimal was ruled out from the tour due to poor performances. Tharanga was also the 8th captain for Sri Lanka in T20Is. Under Upul Tharanga's captaincy, Sri Lanka went on to win the T20I series against Australia in Australia, which meant this was the record 3rd consecutive time Sri Lanka managed to win the T20I series against Australia in Australia.

On 28 March 2017, he played in his 200th ODI match, when Sri Lanka played Bangladesh. In the match he scored his 31st fifty, but the match ended in no result due to heavy rain.

With the calf injury of Mathews prior to 2017 ICC Champions Trophy, Tharanga was named stand-in captain for the first group match against South Africa. However, Sri Lanka lost the match by 96 runs and due to slow over rate, Tharanga was fined with two matches after four-hour innings and disqualified for rest of the pool games against India and Pakistan.

Though he was appointed several times as the captain, it was only temporary due to the injury concerns of captain Mathews. However, after the major loss to Zimbabwe in home soil for the first time, Mathews' captaincy was questioned by many critics. The result was, Mathews stepped down from the role in all formats on 11 July 2017. With that, Tharanga was named permanent captain of the limited over formats for Sri Lanka.

Tharanga led Sri Lanka on day 4 in the first test against India on 28 July 2017, where stand-in captain Rangana Herath was injured while playing in the match. However, Sri Lanka lost the match by 304 runs, which is the biggest loss by Sri Lanka in term of runs in tests as well. In the second ODI against India on 24 August 2017, Tharanga was penalized for slow over-rate, and suspended for two ODIs. This was his second time in three months that penalized due to slow over rate as well.

On 16 October 2017, Tharanga became the first batsman for Sri Lanka, and the first captain overall, to carry his bat in an ODI.

Under Upul Tharanga captaincy, Sri Lanka suffered three 5-0 whitewashes in the year 2017. Apart from suffering whitewashes at the hands of South Africa, India and Pakistan in 2017, it threatened automatic qualification for the 2019 Cricket World Cup. Tharanga also got into trouble twice due to slow over rates and was suspended.

On 29 November 2017, Sri Lanka Cricket sacked Tharanga from captaincy and Thisara Perera was named as Sri Lanka's captain for the ODI and T20I matches against India. Under Tharanga's captaincy, Sri Lanka suffered three 5-0 ODI whitewashes in the year 2017 against South Africa, India and Pakistan. His win–loss ratio is 4/15.

In May 2018, he was one of 33 cricketers to be awarded a national contract by Sri Lanka Cricket ahead of the 2018–19 season.

== Doping violation ==
A urine sample provided by Tharanga after the world cup semi-final against New Zealand on 29 March 2011 was found to have metabolites of two glucocorticosteroids – prednisone and prednisolone, which are banned by the World Anti-Doping Agency. Tharanga initially claimed he had taken some medication for asthma and had no idea it was a banned drug.

An independent anti-doping tribunal was convened at which Tharanga pleaded guilty, claiming he had taken some herbal remedy to ease discomfort caused by a long-standing shoulder injury. The tribunal accepted that Tharanga "had no intention to enhance his sporting performance or to mask the use of another performance enhancing substance, but that he had failed to satisfy the high levels of personal responsibility implicit upon him as an international cricketer subject to anti-doping rules". The tribunal found Tharanga guilty of breaching the ICC Anti-Doping Code and banned him from all cricket and cricket-related activities for a three-month period (9 May 2011 to 8 August 2011).

== International centuries ==
In his third Test match he scored his first Test Century in Shaheed Chandu Stadium, Bogra. Tharanga made his ODI debut against West Indies in 2005. He scored his first ODI century back in 2005 against Bangladesh scoring 105 in R. Premadasa Stadium in Colombo. His highest ODI score came in 2013 against India where he scored 174 Not out at Sabina Park, Kingston, Jamaica. It's the third highest score by a Sri Lankan in ODI after and Pathum Nissanka's 210 and Sanath Jayasuriya's 189. As of 16 March 2019, Tharanga has scored three Test centuries and 15 ODI centuries.
