= Niroshan Dickwella =

Sri Lankan cricketer

Personal information
- Full name: Dickwella Patabendige Dilantha Niroshan Dickwella
- Born: 23 June 1993 (age 33); Kandy, Sri Lanka
- Nickname: Dick sulanga
- Batting: Left-handed
- Role: Wicket-keeper-batter

International information
- National side: Sri Lanka (2014–present)
- Test debut (cap 127): 24 July 2014 v South Africa
- Last Test: 24 August 2026 v India
- ODI debut (cap 161): 16 November 2014 v India
- Last ODI: 21 June 2022 v Australia
- T20I debut (cap 61): 9 February 2016 v India
- Last T20I: 26 June 2021 v England

Domestic team information
- Years: Team
- 2012–present: Nondescripts Cricket Club
- 2020: Dambulla Viiking
- 2024: Galle Marvels
- 2025–present: Lumbini Lions
- 2026: Dambulla Sixers

Career statistics
| Competition | Test | ODI | T20I | FC |
|---|---|---|---|---|
| Matches | 54 | 55 | 28 | 143 |
| Runs scored | 2,757 | 1,604 | 480 | 8,430 |
| Batting average | 30.97 | 31.45 | 18.46 | 35.87 |
| 100s/50s | 0/22 | 2/9 | 0/1 | 16/48 |
| Top score | 96 | 116 | 68 | 209 |
| Catches/stumpings | 134/27 | 41/11 | 12/1 | 333/78 |
Medal record
Men's cricket
Representing Sri Lanka
Asian Games
| Bronze medal – third place | 2026 Aichi–Nagoya | Team |
- Source: Cricinfo, 11 March 2025

Dickwella Patabendige Dilantha Niroshan Dickwella, known as Niroshan Dickwella (born 23 June 1993), is a professional Sri Lankan cricketer, who plays all formats of the game for Sri Lanka. A left-hand batsman, he also plays as a wicket-keeper of the team. Dickwella is known for hitting left handed Dilscoops. In November 2017, he was named the emerging cricketer of the year for the 2016–17 season at Sri Lanka Cricket's annual awards.

On 16 August 2024, Sri Lanka Cricket (SLC) announced in a media release that Dickwella has been suspended from all forms of cricket due to an alleged anti-doping rule violation. The suspension was to be effective until further notice. Following the conclusion of the disciplinary inquiry, he was subsequently banned from all forms of cricket for a period of three years, effective from 13 August 2024. On 11 December 2024, Dickwella's three-year ban was reduced to three months following a decision by an appeal panel. As a result, he became eligible to participate in all forms of cricket with immediate effect.

== Education and early life ==
Dickwella completed his primary education at Trinity College, Kandy, Sri Lanka.

He captained the Trinity College 1st XI cricket team at the under-19 level during the 2011-12 Sri Lankan schools cricket season. Under his leadership, Trinity achieved an unprecedented triple crown, winning the two-day league tournament, the one-day knockout tournament, and the T20 championship. This included an impressive 14 outright victories in the two-day league, culminating in a historic Big Match triumph over St. Anthony's College, in the Trinity–Antonian Cricket Encounter, after a 26-year drought.

Dickwella was named the Observer-Mobitel Schoolboy Cricketer of the Year in 2012.

== Domestic and T20 franchise career ==
In March 2018, he was named as the vice-captain of Kandy's squad for the 2017–18 Super Four Provincial Tournament. He was the leading run-scorer for Kandy during the tournament, with 315 runs in three matches. The following month, he was also named as the vice-captain of Kandy's squad for the 2018 Super Provincial One Day Tournament.

In August 2018, he was named in Galle's squad the 2018 SLC T20 League. In March 2019, he was named in Dambulla's squad for the 2019 Super Provincial One Day Tournament.

In June 2019, he was selected to play for the Montreal Tigers franchise team in the 2019 Global T20 Canada tournament. In October 2020, he was drafted by the Dambulla Viiking for the inaugural edition of the Lanka Premier League. In November 2021, he was selected to play for the Dambulla Giants following the players' draft for the 2021 Lanka Premier League. In July 2022, he was signed by the Colombo Stars for the third edition of the Lanka Premier League.

== International career ==
He made his Test cricket debut for Sri Lanka against South Africa in July 2014. He made his One Day International debut for Sri Lanka against India on 16 November 2014. He made his Twenty20 International (T20I) debut for Sri Lanka against India on 9 February 2016.

Dickwella was originally included into 2016 ICC World Twenty20 Sri Lanka squad, but due to poor performances in India tour and 2016 Asia Cup, he was dropped from the world cup squad.

Dickwella was called up for the South African limited over tour after fine performances in domestic tournaments. He was included in the T20I side as the opening batsman and scored quick innings in all three matches. He scored his maiden T20I fifty as a match-winning knock in the third match, which ensured the first series win against South Africa on their home soil in any format. Dickwella was adjudged both man of the match and player of the series for his match-winning batting performances.

After the ban, he looked forward to coming back to the squad for second ODI against Bangladesh in late March 2017. However, he was ruled out of the series due to hairline fracture in his left hand.

He scored his first ODI century on 6 July 2017 against Zimbabwe at the Mahinda Rajapaksa International Cricket Stadium. Along with Danushka Gunathilaka, they made a 229-run partnership for the first wicket, where Gunathilaka also scored his first ODI century. Sri Lanka chased 310 to win the match, which was the first 300-plus chase by Sri Lanka on home soil. In the fourth ODI against Zimbabwe, he and Danushka Gunathilaka set the record for becoming the first pair of batsmen to score two successive 200-plus partnerships in ODIs.

In May 2018, he was one of 33 cricketers to be awarded a national contract by Sri Lanka Cricket ahead of the 2018–19 season. In March 2021, during the first Test against the West Indies, he set a new record for scoring the most half centuries by a batsman (17) in Test cricket without scoring a century, passing the previous record held by Chetan Chauhan.

In June 2022, he was named in the Sri Lanka A squad for their matches against Australia A during Australia's tour of Sri Lanka. In the Australian Test series in July 2022, Sri Lanka suffered a huge defeat, with the match ending in three days. In the match, Dickwella was the only Sri Lankan player to score a fifty, scoring 58 runs in the first innings.

== Disciplinary issues ==
In July 2014, on his Test debut, he was fined 10% of the match fees for claiming unfair catch.

During the fourth ODI against South Africa on 7 February 2017, Dickwella had a verbal encounter with Kagiso Rabada and was fined, along with gaining three demerit points. On 21 February 2017, Dickwella was suspended for two limited over matches, after a Code of Conduct breach during the second T20I against Australia at Kardinia Park. He was fined 30% of his match fees and was given two more demerit points.

In July 2017, Dickwella was fined 30 percent of his match fee and received two demerit points for breaching the ICC Code of Conduct. during the ODI against Zimbabwe.

On 28 June 2021, Sri Lanka Cricket (SLC) suspended Dickwella, Kusal Mendis and Danushka Gunathilaka after they breached the team's bio-secure bubble during Sri Lanka's tour of England. All three players were seen in the city centre of Durham, with SLC sending them all back home ahead of the ODI matches. In July 2021, following the outcome of the incident, Dickwella was suspended from playing in international cricket for one year. Sri Lanka Cricket agreed to lift the ban early, rescinding the punishment in January 2022.

== Anti-doping rule violation ==
On 16 August 2024, Sri Lanka Cricket (SLC) announced in a media release that Dickwella has been suspended from all forms of cricket due to an alleged anti-doping rule violation during the Lanka Premier League 2024. The tests were conducted by the Sri Lanka Anti-Doping Agency (SLADA) in accordance with World Anti-Doping Agency (WADA) guidelines. The suspension is effective immediately and will remain in place until further notice.

Dickwella appeared before a disciplinary committee on 23 August 2024, and agreed to submit a written statement within a week. He accepted the A-sample test results and chose not to request B-sample testing.

On 29 September 2024, it was reported that Dickwella had been banned from all forms of cricket for three years, effective from 13 August 2024. This followed his provisional suspension in August 2024 and the subsequent disciplinary inquiry, where he admitted to using cocaine, a prohibited substance. He is the first national cricketer to receive a three-year ban from all forms of the game for failing a drug test.

On 11 December 2024, it was reported that Dickwella's three-year ban from all forms of cricket, effective from 13 August 2024, had been reduced to three months following a decision by an appeal panel. As a result, he became eligible to participate in all forms of cricket with immediate effect.

== Accolades ==
- Schoolboy Cricketer of the Year 2012
- Dialog SLC Emerging Cricketer of the Year 2016–17.
