= Vikum Sanjaya =

Sri Lankan cricketer

Personal information
- Full name: Jayasundara Ranasinghe Mudiyanselage Vikum Sanjaya Bandara
- Born: 10 February 1992 (age 34); Colombo, Sri Lanka
- Batting: Right-handed
- Bowling: Right-arm fast-medium
- Role: Bowler

International information
- National side: Sri Lanka
- T20I debut (cap 70): 17 February 2017 v Australia
- Last T20I: 27 October 2017 v Pakistan
- T20I shirt no.: 58

Domestic team information
- Years: Team
- Burgher Recreation Club
- 2015-present: Colombo Cricket Club
- 2016-present: Seeduwa Raddoluwa CC

Career statistics
Competition	T20I
Matches	8
Runs scored	20
Batting average	6.66
100s/50s	0/0
Top score	6
Balls bowled	173
Wickets	9
Bowling average	27.77
5 wickets in innings	0
10 wickets in match	0
Best bowling	2/20
Catches/stumpings	1/–
- Source: Cricinfo, 30 October 2017

Jayasundara Ranasinghe Mudiyanselage Vikum Sanjaya Bandara, popularly known as Vikum Sanjaya (born 10 February 1992), is a professional Sri Lankan cricketer, who played Twenty20 Internationals.

== Domestic career ==
He made his first-class debut for Colombo Cricket Club in the 2011–12 Premier Trophy on 20 January 2012.

In April 2018, he was named in Colombo's squad for the 2018 Super Provincial One Day Tournament. In August 2018, he was named in Dambulla's squad the 2018 SLC T20 League.

== International career ==
In December 2016 he was added to Sri Lanka's Test squad for their series against South Africa. In January 2017 he was added to Sri Lanka's One Day International (ODI) squad for their series, also against South Africa.

He made his Twenty20 International (T20I) debut for Sri Lanka against Australia at the Melbourne Cricket Ground on 17 February 2017. He took his first international wicket by dismissing Moisés Henriques for 17 runs.
