= Sachith Pathirana =

Sri Lankan cricketer (born 1989)

Personal information
- Full name: Sachith Shanaka Pathirana
- Born: 21 March 1989 (age 37); Kandy, Sri Lanka
- Height: 5 ft 9 in (1.75 m)
- Batting: Left-handed
- Bowling: Slow left-arm orthodox
- Role: All-rounder

International information
- National side: Sri Lanka (2015–2017)
- ODI debut (cap 165): 15 July 2015 v Pakistan
- Last ODI: 17 December 2017 v India
- ODI shirt no.: 10
- T20I debut (cap 67): 6 September 2016 v Australia
- Last T20I: 29 October 2017 v Pakistan
- T20I shirt no.: 10

Domestic team information
- Years: Team
- Colombo
- Kandy Youth Cricket Club
- 2014: Ragama
- 2012-2014: Ruhuna Royals

Career statistics
Competition	ODI	T20I	FC	LA
Matches	18	5	96	108
Runs scored	332	27	3,736	1,955
Batting average	25.53	5.40	26.87	24.13
100s/50s	0/1	0/0	3/22	0/10
Top score	56	14	168	90*
Balls bowled	765	95	15,613	4,471
Wickets	15	5	324	133
Bowling average	48.00	23.80	30.53	26.40
5 wickets in innings	0	0	21	3
10 wickets in match	0	0	3	0
Best bowling	3/37	2/23	7/49	5/20
Catches/stumpings	4/–	0/–	52/–	29/–
Medal record
Men's Cricket
Representing Sri Lanka
South Asian Games
Silver medal – second place	2010 Dhaka	Team
- Source: ESPNricinfo, 25 June 2025

Sachith Shanaka Pathirana (born 21 March 1989) is a Sri Lankan former cricketer, who played for the national team and domestically in first-class, List A and Twenty20 matches. Pathirana was a bowling all-rounder who bowled slow left-arm orthodox spin and left handed lower-middle order batsman. Presently he serves as the spin bowling coach of the Sri Lanka Under-19 cricket team.

== Early life ==
Pathirana grew up in Kandy and attended Trinity College where he captained the school's first XI.

== Youth and domestic career ==
Pathirana played in Sri Lanka's 2006 ICC Under-19 Cricket World Cup team. He captained the Sri Lanka U-19 side aged just 17 in an ODI Triangular Series against England and Malaysia in 2007. At the 2008 ICC Under-19 Cricket World Cup he excelled by scoring 231 runs and claiming 10 wickets.

Pathirana is the leading wicket-taker for Sri Lanka in U19 ODIs with a total of 64 wickets in 23 matches.

He began his first class career at Colombo Cricket Club in 2008, moving to Ragama Cricket Club, before changing over to Chilaw Marians in 2012.

In March 2018, he was named in Kandy's squad for the 2017–18 Super Four Provincial Tournament. The following month, he was also named in Kandy's squad for the 2018 Super Provincial One Day Tournament.

In August 2018, he was named in Kandy's squad the 2018 SLC T20 League. He was the leading wicket-taker for Badureliya Sports Club in the 2018–19 Premier League Tournament, with 24 dismissals in nine matches.

== International career ==
He made his One Day International (ODI) debut for Sri Lanka against Pakistan on 15 July 2015. He took 2 wickets for 54 runs. Together with Dinesh Chandimal, they put on a 50-run partnership, which helped Sri Lanka to win the match. Pathirana scored 33 runs in his first match.

He made his Twenty20 International (T20I) debut for Sri Lanka against Australia on 6 September 2016.

Pathirana scored his maiden ODI fifty on 10 February 2017 against South Africa at Centurion. However, his score was not enough for the team's victory and Sri Lanka lost the match by 88 runs and also the series 5–0.

== Coaching career ==
Pathirana was appointed player-cum head coach of Badureliya Sports Club in 2018. In September 2019, he was appointed as spin bowling coach of Sri Lanka U-19 team.

He has been coaching in English cricket circuits since 2019.
