= Dilruwan Perera =

Sri Lankan cricketer

Personal information
- Full name: Mahawaduge Dilruwan Kamalaneth Perera
- Born: 22 July 1982 (age 44); Panadura, Sri Lanka
- Height: 5 ft 10 in (1.78 m)
- Batting: Right-handed
- Bowling: Right-arm off spin
- Role: All-rounder

International information
- National side: Sri Lanka (2007–2021)
- Test debut (cap 126): 17 January 2014 v Pakistan
- Last Test: 22 January 2021 v England
- ODI debut (cap 133): 13 October 2007 v England
- Last ODI: 15 September 2018 v Bangladesh
- ODI shirt no.: 47
- T20I debut (cap 40): 6 August 2011 v Australia
- Last T20I: 25 November 2011 v Pakistan

Domestic team information
- Years: Team
- 2000/01–2003/04: Panadura Sports Club
- 2004/05: Chilaw Marians Cricket Club
- 2005/06–2006/07: Panadura Sports Club
- 2007/08–present: Colts Cricket Club
- 2020: Kandy Tuskers

Career statistics
Competition	Test	ODI	FC	LA
Matches	43	13	233	201
Runs scored	1,303	152	8,383	3,109
Batting average	18.88	12.66	24.02	18.28
100s/50s	0/7	0/0	5/45	1/10
Top score	95	30	137*	114
Balls bowled	10,805	456	44,162	8,182
Wickets	161	13	841	200
Bowling average	35.90	31.46	26.55	27.50
5 wickets in innings	8	0	42	4
10 wickets in match	2	0	4	0
Best bowling	6/32	3/48	7/71	6/28
Catches/stumpings	19/0	2/0	156/0	58/0
- Source: ESPNcricinfo, 5 October 2024

Mahawaduge Dilruwan Kamalaneth Perera (Sinhala: දිල්රුවන් පෙරේරා; born 22 July 1982) is a Sri Lankan former international cricketer, who played for Sri Lanka in all formats of the game. He plays domestically for the Colts Cricket Club. Perera is a right-arm offbreak bowler and right-handed batsman. Starting as an opening batsman, Perera was the quickest Sri Lankan bowler to reach both 50 and 100 Test wickets in Sri Lanka until he was surpassed by Prabath Jayasuriya. Dilruwan is a past student of Sri Sumangala College.

On 26 January 2022, he announced his retirement from all forms of international cricket with immediate effect.

== Domestic career ==
In 2004 he represented Sri Lanka at the Hong Kong Sixes competition. He made his Twenty20 debut on 17 August 2004, for Chilaw Marians Cricket Club in the 2004 SLC Twenty20 Tournament.

In March 2018, he was named in Colombo's squad for the 2017–18 Super Four Provincial Tournament. In August 2018, he was named as the vice-captain of Dambulla's squad in the 2018 SLC T20 League. In August 2020, he took his 800th first-class wicket, during the final round of matches in the 2019–20 Premier League Tournament. In October 2020, he was drafted by the Kandy Tuskers for the inaugural edition of the Lanka Premier League.

== International career ==
On 13 October 2007 Perera made his ODI debut against England in Colombo. Opening the batting, he scored 30. On 16 January 2014 he made his test debut against Pakistan at Sharjah. Coming in to bat at number 8, he was the top scorer in Sri Lanka's 1st innings with 95.

After a series of good bowling and five-wicket hauls, Perera was dropped from the Test squad due to many upcoming new talents. However, he had late response to international cricket at the age of 30, Perera showcased his sheer talents when he got the chance to play. Perera was included in the Test series against West Indies in October 2015, and played in the second Test at P Sara Oval. He could not show talents with the bat, but he took 4 wickets in crucial intervals of the match. Sri Lanka finally won the match by 72 runs and won the series 2-0.

Perera was included in the Warne-Muralitharan Trophy in 2016, as a frontline spinner with Rangana Herath. In the second test at Galle, he took ten wickets for 99 runs in the match with his best bowling figures of 6/70 in the second innings. He also scored his highest Test score of 64 in the second innings, becoming the first Sri Lankan to score a fifty and to take a ten-wicket haul in the same Test. Sri Lanka won the match by 229 runs and won the Warne-Murali Trophy as well.

With bowling maestro Herath, Perera devastated Australian batting line up in all three matches. In the whole series, Perera took 15 wickets and Herath took 28 wickets. The spin duo provided the series win and whitewash of Australia for the first time.

During the first test against India, Perera scored unbeaten 92 runs, which was praised by commentators as a fighting innings. However, with falling wickets at the other end, he was stranded eight short of a maiden Test century. In the second innings, Perera also scored brisk unbeaten 21 runs as well. However, Sri Lanka lost the match by 304 runs.

Perera took his fifth five-wicket haul on 10 October 2017 against Pakistan at Dubai. His bowling figures of 5 for 98 in the second innings allowed Sri Lanka to win the match by 68 runs and Sri Lanka sweep the series 2-0. With 5/98, Perera became the first Sri Lankan to take a five-wicket haul in day-night Tests.

During the third test against India, he took his 100th test wicket by dismissing Indian opener Shikhar Dhawan. With 25 matches to reach the milestone, Perera became the fastest bowler for Sri Lanka, in terms of matches played, to take 100 wickets in Tests. In May 2018, he was one of 33 cricketers to be awarded a national contract by Sri Lanka Cricket ahead of the 2018–19 season.

In the first Test match against South Africa, he took match winning ten-wicket haul of 10 for 78 at Galle International Stadium. This was his second tenner and sixth fiver as well. South Africa were all out for just 73 runs, which is their lowest total after readmission. Sri Lanka finally won the match by 278 runs. In November 2018, in the third Test against England, he became the fastest bowler for Sri Lanka, in terms of matches, to take 100 wickets at home in Tests, doing so in his 20th match.

== Achievements ==
- He is the fastest Sri Lankan to reach 50 Test wickets (in 11 matches)
- He is the fastest Sri Lankan to take 100 Test wickets (in 25 matches).
- He is the first Sri Lankan to take 10 wickets and score a half-century in the same Test.
- Dialog SLC Test All-rounder of the year 2016–17.
- Fastest cricketer for Sri Lanka to claim the double of 100 wickets and 1,000 runs in Tests.
- Fastest bowler for Sri Lanka, in terms of matches, to take 100 wickets at home in Tests (20).
