= English cricket team in Sri Lanka in 2018–19 =

International cricket tour

	Sri Lanka	England
- Dates: 5 October – 27 November 2018
Captains	Dinesh Chandimal (Tests & ODIs) (Note: Suranga Lakmal captained Sri Lanka in the second and third Tests.); Thisara Perera (T20I)	Joe Root (Tests); Eoin Morgan (ODIs & T20I) (Note: Jos Buttler captained England in the fifth ODI.)

Test series
- Result: England won the 3-match series 3–0
Most runs	Dimuth Karunaratne (256)	Ben Foakes (277)
Most wickets	Dilruwan Perera (22)	Jack Leach (18); Moeen Ali (18)
- Player of the series: Ben Foakes (Eng)

One Day International series
- Results: England won the 5-match series 3–1
Most runs	Niroshan Dickwella (192)	Eoin Morgan (195)
Most wickets	Akila Dananjaya (9)	Tom Curran (6); Adil Rashid (6)
- Player of the series: Eoin Morgan (Eng)

Twenty20 International series
- Results: England won the 1-match series 1–0
Most runs	Thisara Perera (57)	Jason Roy (69)
Most wickets	Amila Aponso (2); Lasith Malinga (2)	Joe Denly (4)

The England cricket team toured Sri Lanka in October and November 2018 to play three Tests, five One Day Internationals (ODIs) and one Twenty20 International (T20I) match. The tour included England's first Test matches in Sri Lanka since 2012.

In September 2018, Sri Lanka Cricket named Dinesh Chandimal as the captain of the ODI team, replacing Angelo Mathews. Days later, Mathews was dropped from Sri Lanka's ODI side due to fitness concerns. However, Mathews was named in Sri Lanka's Test squad, which was named at the same time as the ODI squad.

England won the ODI series 3–1, after the first match finished in a no result. Despite all five ODIs being affected by rain, the England and Wales Cricket Board (ECB) defended the decision to play the series during Sri Lanka's monsoon season, saying that they had "very little wriggle room" with regard to the dates. England won the one-off T20I match by 30 runs.

In October 2018, Sri Lankan bowler Rangana Herath announced that he would retire from international cricket following the first Test in Galle. In the first innings of the match, he became the third bowler to take 100 Test wickets at the same venue, when he dismissed the England captain Joe Root. After the match, Herath said that it was "the right time" to retire, finishing his career with 433 Test wickets, the most for a left-arm spin bowler. Sri Lanka's Test captain, Dinesh Chandimal, was ruled out of the rest of the series after suffering an injury in the first Test, with Suranga Lakmal named as his replacement as captain for the remaining two Tests.

England won the first two Test matches, therefore giving them an unassailable lead, and their first series win in Sri Lanka since 2001. England went on to win the third Test by 42 runs, therefore winning the series 3–0. It was the first time that England had won every Test of a three-match series in Sri Lanka. It was also England's first clean sweep in an overseas series of three or more Tests since beating New Zealand in 1963. The Test series saw 100 wickets taken by spin bowling, a record for a three-match series.

== Squads ==
Tests		ODIs		T20I	
Sri Lanka	England	Sri Lanka	England	Sri Lanka	England
Dinesh Chandimal (c); Suranga Lakmal (vc); Charith Asalanka; Dushmantha Chameera; Akila Dananjaya; Niroshan Dickwella; Danushka Gunathilaka; Rangana Herath; Dimuth Karunaratne; ~~Lahiru Kumara~~; Angelo Mathews; Kusal Mendis; Nishan Peiris; Dilruwan Perera; Malinda Pushpakumara; Kasun Rajitha; Lakshan Sandakan; Dhananjaya de Silva; Kaushal Silva; Roshen Silva	Joe Root (c); Jos Buttler (vc); Moeen Ali; James Anderson; Jonny Bairstow (wk); Stuart Broad; Rory Burns; Sam Curran; Joe Denly; Ben Foakes (wk); Keaton Jennings; Jack Leach; Ollie Pope; Adil Rashid; Ben Stokes; Olly Stone; Chris Woakes	Dinesh Chandimal (c); Amila Aponso; Dushmantha Chameera; Akila Dananjaya; Niroshan Dickwella; Lasith Malinga; Kusal Mendis; Kusal Perera; Thisara Perera; Nuwan Pradeep; Kasun Rajitha; Sadeera Samarawickrama; Lakshan Sandakan; Dasun Shanaka; Dhananjaya de Silva; Upul Tharanga	Eoin Morgan (c); Jos Buttler (vc, wk); Moeen Ali; Jonny Bairstow; Sam Curran; Tom Curran; Liam Dawson; Joe Denly; Alex Hales; Liam Plunkett; Adil Rashid; Joe Root; Jason Roy; Ben Stokes; Olly Stone; Chris Woakes; Mark Wood	Thisara Perera (c); Amila Aponso; Dushmantha Chameera; Dinesh Chandimal; Akila Dananjaya; Niroshan Dickwella; Lasith Malinga; Kamindu Mendis; Kusal Mendis; ~~Kusal Perera~~; Nuwan Pradeep; Kasun Rajitha; Sadeera Samarawickrama; Lakshan Sandakan; Dasun Shanaka; Dhananjaya de Silva; Isuru Udana	Eoin Morgan (c); Jos Buttler (vc, wk); Moeen Ali; ~~Jonny Bairstow~~; Sam Curran; Tom Curran; ~~Liam Dawson~~; Joe Denly; Alex Hales; Chris Jordan; Liam Plunkett; Adil Rashid; Joe Root; Jason Roy; Ben Stokes; Olly Stone; Chris Woakes; Mark Wood

Liam Plunkett was included in the England ODI squad, but missed the first three matches due to his wedding. Prior to the third ODI, Liam Dawson was ruled out of the series with a side strain, and replaced by Joe Denly. Jonny Bairstow suffered an injury in training ahead of the fourth ODI and was ruled out of the remaining limited-over matches. Chris Jordan was added to the England squad for the one-off T20I. Ben Foakes was added to England's Test squad as cover for Jonny Bairstow. Bairstow's injury also ruled him out of the first Test. Ahead of the second Test, Ollie Pope was released from England's squad, to allow him to play with the England Lions.

Kusal Mendis was added to Sri Lanka's squad, replacing Kusal Perera who suffered an injury during the second ODI match. Kusal Perera was then ruled out of the one-off T20I, with Sadeera Samarawickrama added to Sri Lanka's squad for the match. Ahead of the Test series, Lahiru Kumara was removed from Sri Lanka's squad for disciplinary reasons, and was replaced by Dushmantha Chameera. Ahead of the second Test, Charith Asalanka was added to Sri Lanka's squad. For the third Test, Nishan Peiris replaced Akila Dananjaya in Sri Lanka's squad. Dananjaya was reported for a suspect bowling action during the first Test. Danushka Gunathilaka was added to Sri Lanka's squad for the third Test, with Asalanka being released.

== Tour matches ==
=== 1st 50 over match: Sri Lanka Board XI vs England ===
5 October 2018
09:45
Scorecard

Sri Lanka Board XI; 287/9 (50 overs)	v	England; 215/2 (35.3 overs)
Dinesh Chandimal 77 (85); Moeen Ali 3/42 (10 overs)		Eoin Morgan 91* (84); Kasun Rajitha 1/26 (6 overs)

England won by 43 runs (DLS method)
P Sara Oval, Colombo
Umpires: Rohitha Kottahachchi (SL) and Nilan De Silva (SL)

- Sri Lanka Board XI won the toss and elected to bat.
- Bad light stopped play.

=== 2nd 50 over match: Sri Lanka Board XI vs England ===
6 October 2018
09:45
Scorecard

Sri Lanka Board XI	v	England

Match abandoned
P Sara Oval, Colombo
Umpires: Keerthi Bandara (SL) and Ravindra Kottahachchi (SL)

- No toss.
- No play was possible due to rain.

=== 1st Two-day match: Sri Lanka Board XI vs England ===
30–31 October 2018
Scorecard

Sri Lanka Board XI	v	England
392/9d (89.5 overs); Kaushal Silva 62 (82); Moeen Ali 2/64 (17 overs)		365/7 (90 overs); Joe Root 100 (117); Nishan Peiris 3/108 (26 overs)

Match drawn
Nondescripts Cricket Club Ground, Colombo
Umpires: Prageeth Rambukwella (SL) and Pradeep Udawatta (SL)

- Sri Lanka Board XI won the toss and elected to bat.

=== 2nd Two-day match: Sri Lanka Board XI vs England ===
1–2 November 2018
Scorecard

England	v	Sri Lanka Board XI
210/6d (50 overs); Ben Stokes 53 (58); Lahiru Kumara 3/19 (7 overs)		200/7 (50 overs); Charith Asalanka 68 (64); Stuart Broad 1/10 (5 overs)

Match drawn
Colombo Cricket Club Ground, Colombo
Umpires: Hemantha Boteju (SL) and Deepal Gunawardene (SL)

- England won the toss and elected to bat.
- No play was possible on day 1 due to rain.

== ODI series ==
=== 1st ODI ===
10 October 2018
14:30 (D/N)
Scorecard

England; 92/2 (15 overs)	v	Sri Lanka
Jonny Bairstow 25 (24); Nuwan Pradeep 1/23 (5 overs)

No result
Rangiri Dambulla International Stadium, Dambulla
Umpires: Aleem Dar (Pak) and Ruchira Palliyaguruge (SL)

- Sri Lanka won the toss and elected to field.
- Rain during England's innings prevented any further play.
- Olly Stone (Eng) made his ODI debut.

=== 2nd ODI ===
13 October 2018
09:45
Scorecard

England; 278/9 (50 overs)	v	Sri Lanka; 140/5 (29 overs)
Eoin Morgan 92 (91); Lasith Malinga 5/44 (10 overs)		Thisara Perera 44* (49); Chris Woakes 3/26 (5 overs)

England won by 31 runs (DLS method)
Rangiri Dambulla International Stadium, Dambulla
Umpires: Ranmore Martinesz (SL) and Paul Reiffel (Aus)
Player of the match: Eoin Morgan (Eng)

- Sri Lanka won the toss and elected to field.
- Rain during Sri Lanka's innings prevented any further play.
- Lasith Malinga (SL) took his 500th wicket in international cricket.

=== 3rd ODI ===
17 October 2018
14:30 (D/N)
Scorecard

Sri Lanka; 150/9 (21 overs)	v	England; 153/3 (18.3 overs)
Niroshan Dickwella 36 (20); Adil Rashid 4/36 (5 overs)		Eoin Morgan 58* (49); Amila Aponso 2/27 (3.3 overs)

England won by 7 wickets
Pallekele International Cricket Stadium, Kandy
Umpires: Aleem Dar (Pak) and Raveendra Wimalasiri (SL)
Player of the match: Adil Rashid (Eng)

- England won the toss and elected to field.
- The match was reduced to 21 overs per side due to rain.

=== 4th ODI ===
20 October 2018
09:45
Scorecard

Sri Lanka; 273/7 (50 overs)	v	England; 132/2 (27 overs)
Dasun Shanaka 66 (66); Moeen Ali 2/55 (10 overs)		Jason Roy 45 (49); Akila Dananjaya 2/27 (7 overs)

England won by 18 runs (DLS method)
Pallekele International Cricket Stadium, Kandy
Umpires: Lyndon Hannibal (SL) and Paul Reiffel (Aus)
Player of the match: Eoin Morgan (Eng)

- England won the toss and elected to field.
- Rain during England's innings prevented any further play.

=== 5th ODI ===
23 October 2018
14:30 (D/N)
Scorecard

Sri Lanka; 366/6 (50 overs)	v	England; 132/9 (26.1 overs)
Niroshan Dickwella 95 (97); Moeen Ali 2/57 (8 overs)		Ben Stokes 67 (60); Akila Dananjaya 4/19 (6.1 overs)

Sri Lanka won by 219 runs (DLS method)
R. Premadasa Stadium, Colombo
Umpires: Aleem Dar (Pak) and Ruchira Palliyaguruge (SL)
Player of the match: Niroshan Dickwella (SL)

- Sri Lanka won the toss and elected to bat.
- Rain during England's innings prevented any further play.
- This was Sri Lanka's highest total against England in ODIs.
- This was England's biggest defeat, in terms of runs, in ODIs.

== T20I match ==
=== Only T20I ===
27 October 2018
19:00 (N)
Scorecard

England; 187/8 (20 overs)	v	Sri Lanka; 157 (20 overs)
Jason Roy 69 (36); Amila Aponso 2/29 (3 overs)		Thisara Perera 57 (31); Joe Denly 4/19 (4 overs)

England won by 30 runs
R. Premadasa Stadium, Colombo
Umpires: Ranmore Martinesz (SL) and Raveendra Wimalasiri (SL)
Player of the match: Joe Denly (Eng)

- Sri Lanka won the toss and elected to field.
- Kamindu Mendis (SL) made his T20I debut.

== Test series ==
=== 1st Test ===
6–10 November 2018 (Note: While five days of play were scheduled for each Test, the first and third Tests reached a result in four days.)
Scorecard

England	v	Sri Lanka
342 (97 overs); Ben Foakes 107 (202); Dilruwan Perera 5/75 (31 overs)		203 (68 overs); Angelo Mathews 52 (122); Moeen Ali 4/66 (21 overs)
322/6d (93 overs); Keaton Jennings 146* (280); Rangana Herath 2/59 (23 overs)		250 (85.1 overs); Angelo Mathews 53 (92); Moeen Ali 4/71 (20 overs)

England won by 211 runs
Galle International Stadium, Galle
Umpires: Marais Erasmus (SA) and Chris Gaffaney (NZ)
Player of the match: Ben Foakes (Eng)

- England won the toss and elected to bat.
- Rory Burns and Ben Foakes (Eng) both made their Test debuts.
- Rangana Herath (SL) played in his 93rd and final Test. In the first innings, he took his 100th Test wicket at this venue.
- Ben Foakes became the 20th batsman for England to score a century on debut in Tests.
- Dilruwan Perera became the fastest cricketer for Sri Lanka to achieve the double of 100 wickets and 1,000 runs in Tests.
- Moeen Ali (Eng) took his 150th wicket in Tests.
- This was England's first win in Tests in Galle and Joe Root's first win as captain of England away from home.

=== 2nd Test ===
14–18 November 2018
Scorecard

England	v	Sri Lanka
290 (75.4 overs); Sam Curran 64 (119); Dilruwan Perera 4/61 (24.4 overs)		336 (103 overs); Roshen Silva 85 (174); Jack Leach 3/70 (29 overs)
346 (80.4 overs); Joe Root 124 (146); Akila Dananjaya 6/115 (25 overs)		243 (74 overs); Angelo Mathews 88 (137); Jack Leach 5/83 (28 overs)

England won by 57 runs
Pallekele International Cricket Stadium, Kandy
Umpires: Marais Erasmus (SA) and Sundaram Ravi (Ind)
Player of the match: Joe Root (Eng)

- England won the toss and elected to bat.
- During Sri Lanka's first innings, England were awarded five penalty runs which were added to their first innings total.
- Jack Leach (Eng) took his first five-wicket haul in Tests.
- 38 wickets were taken by spin bowling in the match, a record in a Test match.

=== 3rd Test ===
23–27 November 2018
Scorecard

England	v	Sri Lanka
336 (92.5 overs); Jonny Bairstow 110 (186); Lakshan Sandakan 5/95 (22 overs)		240 (65.5 overs); Dimuth Karunaratne 83 (125); Adil Rashid 5/49 (13.5 overs)
230 (69.5 overs); Jos Buttler 64 (79); Dilruwan Perera 5/88 (29.5 overs)		284 (86.4 overs); Kusal Mendis 86 (129); Jack Leach 4/72 (28.4 overs)

England won by 42 runs
Sinhalese Sports Club, Colombo
Umpires: Chris Gaffaney (NZ) and Sundaram Ravi (Ind)
Player of the match: Jonny Bairstow (Eng)

- England won the toss and elected to bat.
- Dilruwan Perera became the fastest bowler for Sri Lanka, in terms of matches, to take 100 wickets at home in Tests (20).
