= Indian cricket team in Sri Lanka in 2017 =

International cricket tour

	Sri Lanka	India
- Dates: 21 July – 6 September 2017
Captains	Dinesh Chandimal (Tests) (Note: Dinesh Chandimal was appointed captain of the Sri Lankan Test side prior to the start of the series. However, he missed the first Test due to pneumonia, with Rangana Herath captaining the side for the match.); Upul Tharanga (ODIs and T20I) (Note: Upul Tharanga was suspended for the 3rd and 4th ODIs, due to bowling a slow over-rate in the 2nd ODI. Chamara Kapugedera captained the side for the 3rd ODI, but was ruled out of the series with a back injury, with Lasith Malinga being given the captaincy for the 4th ODI.)	Virat Kohli

Test series
- Result: India won the 3-match series 3–0
Most runs	Dimuth Karunaratne (285)	Shikhar Dhawan (358)
Most wickets	Nuwan Pradeep (6)	Ravichandran Ashwin (17)
- Player of the series: Shikhar Dhawan (Ind)

One Day International series
- Results: India won the 5-match series 5–0
Most runs	Angelo Mathews (192)	Virat Kohli (330)
Most wickets	Akila Dananjaya (9)	Jasprit Bumrah (15)
- Player of the series: Jasprit Bumrah (Ind)

Twenty20 International series
- Results: India won the 1-match series 1–0
Most runs	Dilshan Munaweera (53)	Virat Kohli (82)
Most wickets	Isuru Udana (1); Lasith Malinga (1); Seekkuge Prasanna (1)	Yuzvendra Chahal (3)
- Player of the series: Virat Kohli (Ind)

The India cricket team toured Sri Lanka between July and September 2017 to play three Test matches, five One Day Internationals (ODIs) and a Twenty20 International match. Ahead of the Test series, the teams played a two-day warm-up match in Colombo.

Dinesh Chandimal was appointed the new Test captain of Sri Lanka following Sri Lanka's ODI defeat to Zimbabwe earlier in the month. However, before the first Test, Chandimal contracted pneumonia, ruling him out of the match. Rangana Herath was later confirmed as captain of the side for the first Test. Chandimal returned to the squad as captain for the second Test. India won the Test series 3–0. It was India's first whitewash away from home in a series of three Tests or more. It was also the first time they had won three Tests in an away series since beating New Zealand 3–1 in 1967–68.

The second ODI of the series in Pallekele was Sri Lanka's 800th ODI match. India won the first three ODIs, therefore winning the series. It was their eighth consecutive ODI series win against Sri Lanka. This defeat, along with previous defeats against Zimbabwe and Bangladesh, prompted the Sri Lanka selection committee to resign. India went on to win the ODI series 5–0; this was the first time Sri Lanka had suffered a whitewash at home in ODIs. India won the one-off T20I match by 7 wickets, thus completing a 9-0 clean sweep against Sri Lanka in all three formats of international cricket in a bilateral series.

== Squads ==
Tests		ODIs		T20Is	
Sri Lanka	India	Sri Lanka	India	Sri Lanka	India
Dinesh Chandimal (c); Rangana Herath; Upul Tharanga; Dimuth Karunaratne; Kusal Mendis; Angelo Mathews; Asela Gunaratne; Niroshan Dickwella (wk); Dhananjaya de Silva; Danushka Gunathilaka; Dilruwan Perera; Suranga Lakmal; Lahiru Kumara; Vishwa Fernando; Malinda Pushpakumara; Nuwan Pradeep; Lakshan Sandakan; Lahiru Thirimanne; Dushmantha Chameera; Lahiru Gamage	Virat Kohli (c); Ravichandran Ashwin (vc); Shikhar Dhawan; Ravindra Jadeja; Bhuvneshwar Kumar; Abhinav Mukund; Hardik Pandya; Axar Patel; Cheteshwar Pujara; Ajinkya Rahane; KL Rahul; Wriddhiman Saha (wk); Mohammed Shami; Ishant Sharma; Rohit Sharma; ~~Murali Vijay~~; Kuldeep Yadav; Umesh Yadav	Upul Tharanga (c); Dushmantha Chameera; Dinesh Chandimal; Akila Dananjaya; Niroshan Dickwella (wk); Vishwa Fernando; Danushka Gunathilaka; Wanindu Hasaranga; Chamara Kapugedera; Lasith Malinga; Angelo Mathews; Kusal Mendis; Dilshan Munaweera; Thisara Perera; Malinda Pushpakumara; Lakshan Sandakan; Milinda Siriwardana; Lahiru Thirimanne	Virat Kohli (c); Rohit Sharma (vc); Jasprit Bumrah; Yuzvendra Chahal; Shikhar Dhawan; MS Dhoni (wk); Kedar Jadhav; Bhuvneshwar Kumar; Manish Pandey; Hardik Pandya; Axar Patel; Ajinkya Rahane; KL Rahul; Shardul Thakur; Kuldeep Yadav	Upul Tharanga (c); Akila Dananjaya; Niroshan Dickwella (wk); Wanindu Hasaranga; Suranga Lakmal; Lasith Malinga; Angelo Mathews; Dilshan Munaweera; Thisara Perera; Seekkuge Prasanna; Vikum Sanjaya; Dasun Shanaka; Milinda Siriwardana; Isuru Udana; Jeffrey Vandersay	Virat Kohli (c); Rohit Sharma (vc); Jasprit Bumrah; Yuzvendra Chahal; Shikhar Dhawan; MS Dhoni (wk); Kedar Jadhav; Bhuvneshwar Kumar; Manish Pandey; Hardik Pandya; Axar Patel; Ajinkya Rahane; KL Rahul; Shardul Thakur; Kuldeep Yadav

Murali Vijay was ruled out of India's Test squad before the series began with a wrist injury and was replaced by Shikhar Dhawan. Asela Gunaratne fractured his thumb on the first morning of the first Test and was ruled out of Sri Lanka's squad for the remaining matches. Lahiru Thirimanne and Lakshan Sandakan were added to Sri Lanka's squad for the second Test. India's Ravindra Jadeja was suspended for the third Test after throwing the ball "in a dangerous manner" during the second match, therefore accumulating enough demerit points to get a suspension. Axar Patel was added to the squad as his replacement. Sri Lanka's Rangana Herath was rested for the third Test at Pallekele after pulling up from the second Test with a stiff back. For the third Test, Dushmantha Chameera and Lahiru Gamage were added to Sri Lanka's squad, while Danushka Gunathilaka was dropped.

For the ODI series, Yuvraj Singh was dropped from India's squad after failing to clear yo-yo test. Dinesh Chandimal and Lahiru Thirimanne were added to Sri Lanka's squad ahead of the third match. They were added as cover for Danushka Gunathilaka and Upul Tharanga. Tharanga was suspended for the third and fourth ODIs, for a slow over-rate in the second match. Chamara Kapugedera captained the side for the third ODI, but sustained a back injury and was ruled of the remaining matches. Lasith Malinga was given the captaincy for the fourth ODI. In the third ODI, Dinesh Chandimal suffered a hairline fracture to his right thumb and was ruled out of the rest of the series. Dilshan Munaweera was added to Sri Lanka's squad ahead of the fourth ODI.

== Tour match ==
21–22 July 2017
Scorecard

Sri Lanka Board President's XI	v	India
187 (55.5 overs); Danushka Gunathilaka 74 (97); Kuldeep Yadav 4/14 (6.5 overs)		312/9d (68 overs); KL Rahul 54 (58); Vishwa Fernando 2/37 (10 overs)

Match drawn
Colombo Cricket Club Ground, Colombo
Umpires: Deepal Gunawardene (SL) and Nilan De Silva (SL)

- Sri Lanka Board President's XI won the toss and elected to bat.

== Test series ==
=== 1st Test ===
26–30 July 2017 (Note: While five days of play were scheduled for each Test, the first and second Test reached a result within four days, while the third Test ended in three days.)
Scorecard

India	v	Sri Lanka
600 (133.1 overs); Shikhar Dhawan 190 (168); Nuwan Pradeep 6/132 (31 overs)		291 (78.3 overs); Dilruwan Perera 92* (132); Ravindra Jadeja 3/67 (22.3 overs)
240/3d (53 overs); Virat Kohli 103* (136); Danushka Gunathilaka 1/16 (5 overs)		245 (76.5 overs); Dimuth Karunaratne 97 (208); Ravichandran Ashwin 3/65 (27 overs)

India won by 304 runs
Galle International Stadium, Galle
Umpires: Richard Illingworth (Eng) and Bruce Oxenford (Aus)
Player of the match: Shikhar Dhawan (Ind)

- India won the toss and elected to bat.
- Hardik Pandya (Ind) and Danushka Gunathilaka (SL) both made their Test debuts.
- Ravichandran Ashwin (Ind) played his 50th Test.
- Nuwan Pradeep (SL) took his first five-wicket haul in Tests.
- This was India's biggest away win and Sri Lanka's biggest defeat in terms of runs in Tests.

=== 2nd Test ===
3–7 August 2017
Scorecard

India	v	Sri Lanka
622/9d (158 overs); Cheteshwar Pujara 133 (232); Rangana Herath 4/154 (41 overs)		183 (49.4 overs); Niroshan Dickwella 51 (48); Ravichandran Ashwin 5/69 (16.4 overs)
		386 (116.5 overs) (f/o); Dimuth Karunaratne 141 (307); Ravindra Jadeja 5/152 (39 overs)

India won by an innings and 53 runs
Sinhalese Sports Club Ground, Colombo
Umpires: Bruce Oxenford (Aus) and Rod Tucker (Aus)
Player of the match: Ravindra Jadeja (Ind)

- India won the toss and elected to bat.
- Malinda Pushpakumara (SL) made his Test debut.
- Cheteshwar Pujara (Ind) played his 50th Test.
- Ravindra Jadeja (Ind) became the fastest left-arm bowler to reach 150 wickets in terms of number of Tests played (32).
- This was the first time that India had beaten Sri Lanka by a margin of an innings in Sri Lanka.

=== 3rd Test ===
12–16 August 2017
Scorecard

India	v	Sri Lanka
487 (122.3 overs); Shikhar Dhawan 119 (123); Lakshan Sandakan 5/132 (35.3 overs)		135 (37.4 overs); Dinesh Chandimal 48 (87); Kuldeep Yadav 4/40 (13 overs)
		181 (74.3 overs) (f/o); Niroshan Dickwella 41 (52); Ravichandran Ashwin 4/68 (28.3 overs)

India won by an innings and 171 runs
Pallekele International Cricket Stadium, Pallekele
Umpires: Richard Illingworth (Eng) and Rod Tucker (Aus)
Player of the match: Hardik Pandya (Ind)

- India won the toss and elected to bat.
- Hardik Pandya became the fifth India player to score a maiden first-class century in a Test. He made 107 runs in the first session of day 2, the most by an India batsman in the session on any day of a Test, beating Virender Sehwag's 99 in 2006.
- Hardik Pandya scored the most runs by an India player off an over in Tests (26).
- Lakshan Sandakan (SL) took his first five-wicket haul in Tests.

== ODI series ==
=== 1st ODI ===
20 August 2017
14:30 (D/N)
Scorecard

Sri Lanka; 216 (43.2 overs)	v	India; 220/1 (28.5 overs)
Niroshan Dickwella 64 (74); Axar Patel 3/34 (10 overs)		Shikhar Dhawan 132* (90)

India won by 9 wickets
Rangiri Dambulla International Stadium, Dambulla
Umpires: Ruchira Palliyaguruge (SL) and Joel Wilson (WI)
Player of the match: Shikhar Dhawan (Ind)

- India won the toss and elected to field.
- Vishwa Fernando (SL) made his ODI debut.
- Lasith Malinga (SL) played his 200th ODI.

=== 2nd ODI ===
24 August 2017
14:30 (D/N)
Scorecard

Sri Lanka; 236/8 (50 overs)	v	India; 231/7 (45.1 overs)
Milinda Siriwardana 58 (58); Jasprit Bumrah 4/43 (10 overs)		Rohit Sharma 54 (45); Akila Dananjaya 6/54 (10 overs)

India won by 3 wickets (DLS method)
Pallekele International Cricket Stadium, Pallekele
Umpires: Ranmore Martinesz (SL) and Paul Reiffel (Aus)
Player of the match: Akila Dananjaya (SL)

- India won the toss and elected to field.
- Rain during the innings break set India a revised target of 231 runs from 47 overs.
- This was Sri Lanka's 800th ODI.
- Akila Dananjaya (SL) took his first five-wicket haul in ODIs.
- MS Dhoni and Bhuvneshwar Kumar's unbeaten 100-run partnership was the highest for the eighth wicket for India against any team in ODIs.

=== 3rd ODI ===
27 August 2017
14:30 (D/N)
Scorecard

Sri Lanka; 217/9 (50 overs)	v	India; 218/4 (45.1 overs)
Lahiru Thirimanne 80 (105); Jasprit Bumrah 5/27 (10 overs)		Rohit Sharma 124* (145); Akila Dananjaya 2/38 (10 overs)

India won by 6 wickets
Pallekele International Cricket Stadium, Pallekele
Umpires: Ruchira Palliyaguruge (SL) and Joel Wilson (WI)
Player of the match: Jasprit Bumrah (Ind)

- Sri Lanka won the toss and elected to bat.
- Chamara Kapugedera became the 20th captain of Sri Lanka in ODIs.
- Jasprit Bumrah (Ind) took his first five-wicket haul in ODIs.

=== 4th ODI ===
31 August 2017
14:30 (D/N)
Scorecard

India; 375/5 (50 overs)	v	Sri Lanka; 207 (42.4 overs)
Virat Kohli 131 (96); Angelo Mathews 2/24 (6 overs)		Angelo Mathews 70 (80); Kuldeep Yadav 2/31 (8.4 overs)

India won by 168 runs
R. Premadasa Stadium, Colombo
Umpires: Paul Reiffel (Aus) and Raveendra Wimalasiri (SL)
Player of the match: Virat Kohli (Ind)

- India won the toss and elected to bat.
- Dilshan Munaweera, Malinda Pushpakumara (SL) and Shardul Thakur (Ind) all made their ODI debuts.
- Lasith Malinga became the 21st captain of Sri Lanka in ODIs.
- MS Dhoni (Ind) played in his 300th ODI and broke the record for most unbeaten innings in ODIs (73).
- Lasith Malinga took his 300th wicket in ODIs, the fourth Sri Lanka player to do so.
- This was Sri Lanka's biggest defeat, in terms of runs, at home in an ODI.

=== 5th ODI ===
3 September 2017
14:30 (D/N)
Scorecard

Sri Lanka; 238 (49.4 overs)	v	India; 239/4 (46.3 overs)
Lahiru Thirimanne 67 (102); Bhuvneshwar Kumar 5/42 (9.4 overs)		Virat Kohli 110* (116); Wanindu Hasaranga 1/29 (4.3 overs)

India won by 6 wickets
R. Premadasa Stadium, Colombo
Umpires: Ranmore Martinesz (SL) and Joel Wilson (WI)
Player of the match: Bhuvneshwar Kumar (Ind)

- Sri Lanka won the toss and elected to bat.
- MS Dhoni (Ind) became the first wicket-keeper to effect 100 stumpings in ODIs.
- Bhuvneshwar Kumar (Ind) took his first five-wicket haul in ODIs.
- Virat Kohli (Ind) scored his 30th century in ODIs.

== T20I series ==
=== Only T20I ===
6 September 2017
19:00 (D/N)
Scorecard

Sri Lanka; 170/7 (20 overs)	v	India; 174/3 (19.2 overs)
Dilshan Munaweera 53 (29); Yuzvendra Chahal 3/43 (4 overs)		Virat Kohli 82 (54); Seekkuge Prasanna 1/25 (3 overs)

India won by 7 wickets
R. Premadasa Stadium, Colombo
Umpires: Ranmore Martinesz (SL) and Ruchira Palliyaguruge (SL)
Player of the match: Virat Kohli (Ind)

- India won the toss and elected to field.
- Ashan Priyanjan (SL) made his T20I debut.
- Virat Kohli (Ind) played in his 50th T20I.
