= Australian cricket team in Sri Lanka in 2016 =

International cricket tour

	Sri Lanka	Australia
- Dates: 26 July 2016 – 9 September 2016
Captains	Angelo Mathews (Tests & ODIs) (Note: Dinesh Chandimal captained Sri Lanka for the 5th ODI.); Dinesh Chandimal (T20Is)	Steve Smith (Tests & ODIs) (Note: David Warner captained Australia for the last three ODI matches.); David Warner (T20Is)

Test series
- Result: Sri Lanka won the 3-match series 3–0
Most runs	Dhananjaya de Silva (325)	Steve Smith (247)
Most wickets	Rangana Herath (28)	Mitchell Starc (24)
- Player of the series: Rangana Herath (SL)

One Day International series
- Results: Australia won the 5-match series 4–1
Most runs	Dinesh Chandimal (236)	George Bailey (270)
Most wickets	Dilruwan Perera (9)	Mitchell Starc (12)
- Player of the series: George Bailey (Aus)

Twenty20 International series
- Results: Australia won the 2-match series 2–0
Most runs	Dhananjaya de Silva (74)	Glenn Maxwell (211)
Most wickets	Sachith Pathirana (3)	Adam Zampa (4); James Faulkner (4); Mitchell Starc (4)
- Player of the series: Glenn Maxwell (Aus)

The Australian cricket team toured Sri Lanka from 18 July to 9 September 2016 to play three Test matches, five One Day Internationals (ODIs), two Twenty20 Internationals (T20Is) matches and a first-class practice match. The Test series was played for Warne–Muralitharan Trophy, with Sri Lanka winning 3–0, their first ever series whitewash against Australia. As a result, Australia slipped from first to third in the ICC Test Championship; Sri Lanka, who had started the series ranked seventh, moved up to sixth.

In August 2016, Sri Lankan batsman Tillakaratne Dilshan announced that he would retire from both ODI and T20I cricket at the end of the series. He retired from all international cricket on 9 September 2016.

On 6 September 2016, Australia recorded the highest ever Twenty20 International score of 263/3 in first T20I of the series. Australia won the ODI series 4–1 and the T20I series 2–0.

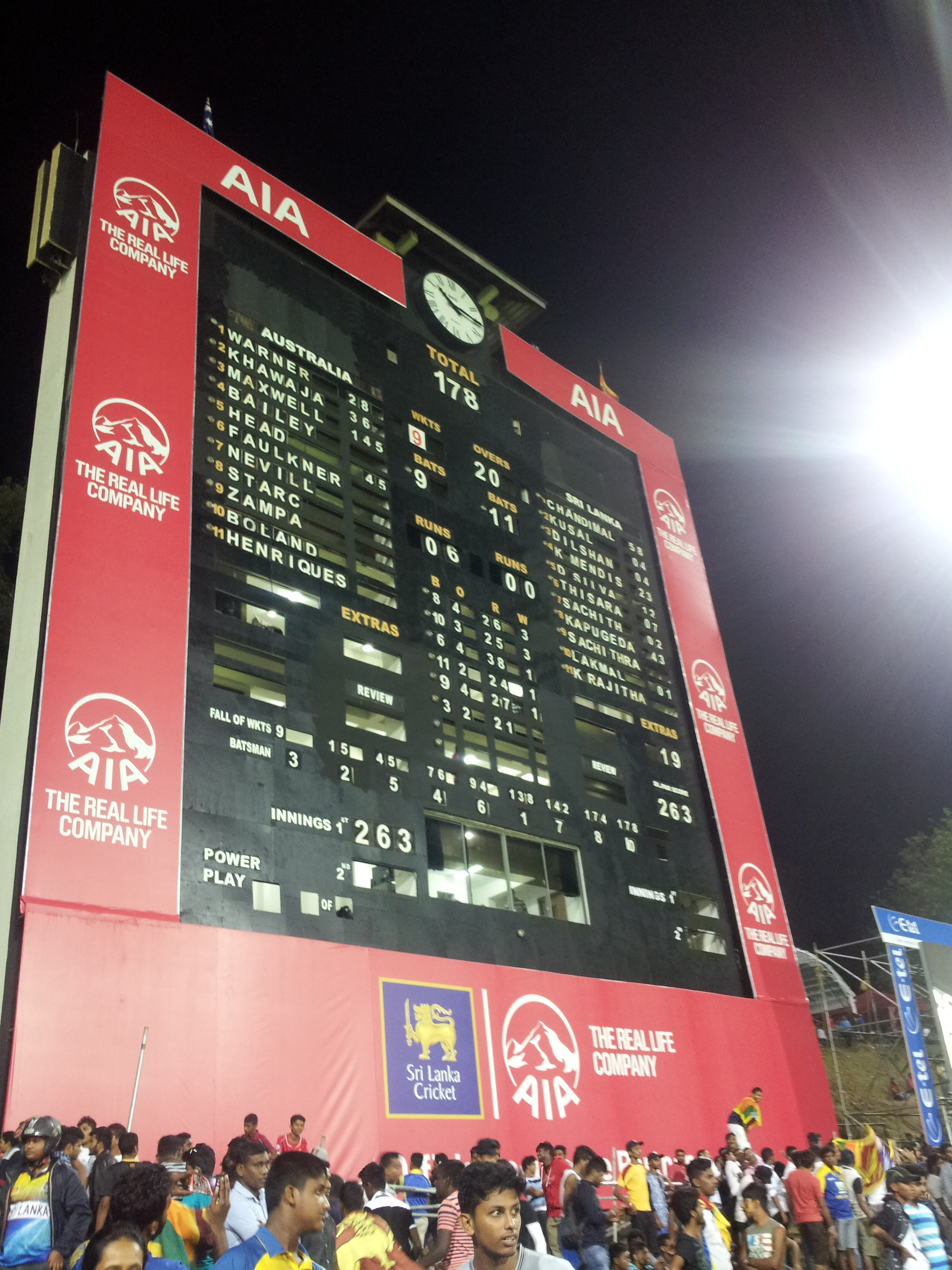
T20I world record team total scoreboard

== Squads ==
Tests		ODIs		T20Is	
Sri Lanka	Australia	Sri Lanka	Australia	Sri Lanka	Australia
Angelo Mathews (c); Dinesh Chandimal (vc, wk); Dhananjaya de Silva; Asitha Fernando; Vishwa Fernando; Rangana Herath; Dimuth Karunaratne; Suranga Lakmal; Kusal Mendis; Dilruwan Perera; Kusal Perera (wk); Nuwan Pradeep; Lakshan Sandakan; Kaushal Silva; Roshen Silva	Steve Smith (c); David Warner (vc); Jackson Bird; Joe Burns; Nathan Coulter-Nile; Josh Hazlewood; Moisés Henriques; Jon Holland; Usman Khawaja; Nathan Lyon; Mitchell Marsh; Shaun Marsh; Peter Nevill (wk); ~~Stephen O'Keefe~~; Mitchell Starc; Adam Voges	Angelo Mathews (c); Amila Aponso; Dinesh Chandimal (wk); Dhananjaya de Silva; Niroshan Dickwella; ~~Tillakaratne Dilshan~~; Avishka Fernando; Danushka Gunathilaka; Suranga Lakmal; Kusal Mendis; Sachith Pathirana; Angelo Perera; Dilruwan Perera; Kusal Perera (wk); Thisara Perera; ~~Nuwan Pradeep~~; Seekkuge Prasanna; Lakshan Sandakan; Dasun Shanaka; Milinda Siriwardana; Upul Tharanga	Steve Smith (c); David Warner (vc); George Bailey; ~~Nathan Coulter-Nile~~; James Faulkner; Aaron Finch; John Hastings; Josh Hazlewood; Travis Head; Moisés Henriques; Usman Khawaja; Mitchell Marsh; ~~Shaun Marsh~~; Nathan Lyon; Mitchell Starc; Matthew Wade (wk); Adam Zampa	Dinesh Chandimal (c); Tillakaratne Dilshan; Chamara Kapugedera; Suranga Lakmal; Kusal Mendis; Sachith Pathirana; Kusal Perera (wk); Thisara Perera; Seekkuge Prasanna; Kasun Rajitha; Sachithra Senanayake; Dasun Shanaka; Dhananjaya de Silva; Milinda Siriwardana	David Warner (c); George Bailey; Scott Boland; James Faulkner; ~~Aaron Finch~~; John Hastings; Travis Head; Moisés Henriques; Usman Khawaja; ~~Chris Lynn~~; ~~Shaun Marsh~~; Glenn Maxwell; Peter Nevill (wk); Mitchell Starc; Matthew Wade; Adam Zampa

With injury concerns, the Sri Lankan selectors picked their Test squads on a match-by-match basis. Stephen O'Keefe suffered a hamstring injury during the first Test and was replaced by Jon Holland. Travis Head was added to Australia's limited overs squads in August.

Following the conclusion of the second ODI match, Australian captain Steve Smith went home to rest, with David Warner captaining the side for the remaining fixtures of the tour. Nathan Coulter-Nile was ruled out of the last three ODI matches the series due to an injury to his lower back. Shaun Marsh broke his finger in the third ODI and was ruled out of the rest of the series. Aaron Finch was ruled out of the T20I series after fracturing his right index finger while fielding a ball during the fifth ODI and Chris Lynn was ruled out due to dislocating his left shoulder while practicing. Matthew Wade and George Bailey, who were not initially included in the T20I series, were selected as replacements.

Nuwan Pradeep was ruled out of Sri Lanka's ODI squad with a hamstring injury and was replaced with Angelo Perera. Sachith Pathirana replaced Tillakaratne Dilshan, who retired after the 3rd ODI. Angelo Mathews was ruled out of the 5th ODI and the T20I series due to injury. Sri Lanka also released Thisara Perera and Lakshan Sandakan for the final ODI game. The three players were replaced by Upul Tharanga, Niroshan Dickwella and Dasun Shanaka. Dinesh Chandimal stood as captain in the 5th ODI.

== Tour match ==
=== First-class: Sri Lankan XI vs Australia ===
18–20 July 2016
Scorecard

Sri Lankan XI	v	Australians
229 (57.2 overs); Asela Gunaratne 58 (106); Steve O'Keefe 5/43 (12.2 overs)		474 (132.3 overs); Steve O'Keefe 78 (139); Shehan Jayasuriya 5/110 (30 overs)
83 (20.5 overs); Shehan Jayasuriya 29 (31); Steve O'Keefe 5/21 (6.5 overs)

Australians won by an innings and 162 runs
P Sara Oval, Colombo
Umpires: Hemantha Boteju (SL) and Nilan De Silva (SL)

- Sri Lankan XI won the toss and elected to bat.

== Test series ==
=== 1st Test ===
26–30 July 2016
Scorecard

Sri Lanka	v	Australia
117 (34.2 overs); Dhananjaya de Silva 24 (38); Nathan Lyon 3/12 (3 overs)		203 (79.2 overs); Adam Voges 47 (115); Rangana Herath 4/49 (25 overs)
353 (93.4 overs); Kusal Mendis 176 (254); Mitchell Starc 4/84 (19 overs)		161 (88.3 overs); Steve Smith 55 (125); Rangana Herath 5/54 (33.3 overs)

Sri Lanka won by 106 runs
Pallekele International Cricket Stadium, Kandy
Umpires: Richard Kettleborough (Eng) and Sundaram Ravi (Ind)
Player of the match: Kusal Mendis (SL)

- Sri Lanka won the toss and elected to bat.
- Play ended early on the first four days due to bad light and rain.
- Rain delayed the start of play by an hour on Day 4 and Day 5.
- Dhananjaya de Silva and Lakshan Sandakan (both SL) made their Test debuts.
- Sri Lanka's first innings was their shortest innings in Tests after electing to bat.
- Dhananjaya de Silva became the first player for Sri Lanka to get off the mark in a Test match by scoring a six.
- Kusal Mendis became the youngest player for Sri Lanka to score a Test century against Australia.
- Nathan Lyon (Aus) took his 200th Test wicket.
- Lakshan Sandakan's (SL) match figures of 7/107 are the best by a slow left-arm wrist-spinner on Test debut.
- While attempting to bat time for a draw on the fifth day, the ninth and tenth-wicket partnerships featuring Steve O'Keefe, Peter Nevill and Josh Hazlewood (Aus) faced a Test cricket record 25.4 consecutive overs without scoring a run.
- This was only Sri Lanka's second win against Australia in twenty-seven Tests.
- Steve Smith suffered his first Test loss as captain of Australia.

=== 2nd Test ===
4–8 August 2016
Scorecard

Sri Lanka	v	Australia
281 (73.1 overs); Kusal Mendis 86 (137); Mitchell Starc 5/44 (16.1 overs)		106 (33.2 overs); David Warner 42 (41); Dilruwan Perera 4/29 (15 overs)
237 (59.3 overs); Dilruwan Perera 64 (89); Mitchell Starc 6/50 (12.3 overs)		183 (50.1 overs); David Warner 41 (31); Dilruwan Perera 6/70 (23 overs)

Sri Lanka won by 229 runs
Galle International Stadium, Galle
Umpires: Chris Gaffaney (NZ) and Richard Kettleborough (Eng)
Player of the match: Dilruwan Perera (SL)

- Sri Lanka won the toss and elected to bat.
- Vishwa Fernando (SL) and Jon Holland (Aus) made their Test debuts.
- This was Sri Lanka's 250th Test match.
- Mitchell Starc (Aus) took his 100th Test wicket and also became the 26th player to take a wicket with the first ball in a Test match.
- Australia's first innings total of 106 is their lowest score against Sri Lanka in Tests.
- Rangana Herath became the first Sri Lankan spinner, the second Sri Lankan, and the oldest to take a hat-trick in a Test.
- Mitchell Starc took the best match figures by an Australian pace bowler in Tests in Sri Lanka.
- Dilruwan Perera became the first Sri Lankan to take ten wickets and score a half-century in the same Test.
- Dilruwan Perera became the fastest Sri Lankan bowler to take 50 wickets, with this being his eleventh Test.
- With this win, it was Sri Lanka's first series victory against Australia since 1999.
- This was Australia's eighth straight loss in Tests in Asia.

=== 3rd Test ===
13–17 August 2016
Scorecard

Sri Lanka	v	Australia
355 (141.1 overs); Dinesh Chandimal 132 (356); Mitchell Starc 5/63 (25.1 overs)		379 (125.1 overs); Shaun Marsh 130 (281); Rangana Herath 6/81 (38.1 overs)
347/8d (99.3 overs); Kaushal Silva 115 (269); Nathan Lyon 4/123 (37 overs)		160 (44.1 overs); David Warner 68 (94); Rangana Herath 7/64 (18.1 overs)

Sri Lanka won by 163 runs
Sinhalese Sports Club Ground, Colombo
Umpires: Chris Gaffaney (NZ) and Sundaram Ravi (Ind)
Player of the match: Rangana Herath (SL)

- Sri Lanka won the toss and elected to bat.
- Dhananjaya de Silva (SL) scored his maiden Test century.
- Mitchell Starc (Aus) became the first fast bowler to take three five-wicket hauls in a Test series in Sri Lanka and he also took his third consecutive five-wicket haul.
- Steve Smith (Aus) became youngest Australian to score 4,000 Test runs.
- Rangana Herath (SL) took the best match figures for a Sri Lankan bowler against Australia.
- Rangana Herath (SL) took his eighth five-wicket haul in the fourth innings of a Test, the most for any bowler.
- This was Sri Lanka's first series whitewash against Australia in Tests.

== ODI series ==
=== 1st ODI ===
21 August 2016
14:30 (D/N)
Scorecard

Sri Lanka; 227/8 (50 overs)	v	Australia; 228/7 (46.5 overs)
Dinesh Chandimal 80* (118); James Faulkner 4/38 (10 overs)		Steve Smith 58 (92); Dilruwan Perera 3/48 (10 overs)

Australia won by 3 wickets
R. Premadasa Stadium, Colombo
Umpires: Aleem Dar (Pak) and Ranmore Martinesz (SL)
Player of the match: James Faulkner (Aus)

- Australia won the toss and elected to field.
- Amila Aponso and Lakshan Sandakan (SL) both made their ODI debuts.
- Mitchell Starc (Aus) became the fastest player to take 100 wickets in ODIs.

=== 2nd ODI ===
24 August 2016
14:30 (D/N)
Scorecard

Sri Lanka; 288 (48.5 overs)	v	Australia; 206 (47.2 overs)
Kusal Mendis 69 (69); Adam Zampa 3/42 (10 overs)		Matthew Wade 76 (88); Amila Aponso 4/18 (9.2 overs)

Sri Lanka won by 82 runs
R. Premadasa Stadium, Colombo
Umpires: Michael Gough (Eng) and Raveendra Wimalasiri (SL)
Player of the match: Angelo Mathews (SL)

- Sri Lanka won the toss and elected to bat.
- James Faulkner (Aus) took a hat-trick.
- Angelo Mathews (SL) took his 50th ODI wicket in Sri Lanka.
- This was Sri Lanka's biggest win in terms of runs against Australia in an ODI.

=== 3rd ODI ===
28 August 2016
14:30 (D/N)
Scorecard

Sri Lanka; 226 (49.2 overs)	v	Australia; 227/8 (46 overs)
Dinesh Chandimal 102 (130); Adam Zampa 3/38 (10 overs)		George Bailey 70 (99); Angelo Mathews 2/30 (7 overs)

Australia won by 2 wickets
Rangiri Dambulla International Stadium, Dambulla
Umpires: Aleem Dar (Pak) and Ranmore Martinesz (SL)
Player of the match: George Bailey (Aus)

- Sri Lanka won the toss and elected to bat.
- This was the first day-night ODI to be hosted in Dambulla in six years.
- This was Tillakaratne Dilshan's (SL) final ODI appearance.
- Dinesh Chandimal (SL) scored his first ODI century in Sri Lanka.
- This was the highest successful run chase against Sri Lanka at Dambulla in an ODI.
- This was also Australia's narrowest win in terms of wickets against Sri Lanka in an ODI.

=== 4th ODI ===
31 August 2016
14:30 (D/N)
Scorecard

Sri Lanka; 212 (50 overs)	v	Australia; 217/4 (31 overs)
Dhananjaya de Silva 76 (87); John Hastings 6/45 (10 overs)		George Bailey 90* (85); Sachith Pathirana 3/37 (8 overs)

Australia won by 6 wickets
Rangiri Dambulla International Stadium, Dambulla
Umpires: Michael Gough (Eng) and Ruchira Palliyaguruge (SL)
Player of the match: John Hastings (Aus)

- Sri Lanka won the toss and elected to bat.
- Avishka Fernando (SL) made his ODI debut.
- John Hastings (Aus) took his first five-wicket haul in an ODI.
- Aaron Finch equalled the record for the fastest fifty by an Australian batsman in an ODI.

=== 5th ODI ===
4 September 2016
14:30 (D/N)
Scorecard

Sri Lanka; 195 (40.2 overs)	v	Australia; 199/5 (43 overs)
Danushka Gunathilaka 39 (40); Mitchell Starc 3/40 (9 overs)		David Warner 106 (126); Dilruwan Perera 3/51 (10 overs)

Australia won by 5 wickets
Pallekele International Cricket Stadium, Kandy
Umpires: Aleem Dar (Pak) and Ruchira Palliyaguruge (SL)
Player of the match: David Warner (Aus)

- Sri Lanka won the toss and elected to bat.
- David Warner scored the first century by an Australian batsman in Sri Lanka in an ODI.

== T20I series ==
=== 1st T20I ===
6 September 2016
19:00 (D/N)
Scorecard

Australia; 263/3 (20 overs)	v	Sri Lanka; 178/9 (20 overs)
Glenn Maxwell 145* (65); Sachith Pathirana 1/45 (4 overs)		Dinesh Chandimal 58 (43); Scott Boland 3/26 (4 overs); Mitchell Starc 3/26 (4 overs)

Australia won by 85 runs
Pallekele International Cricket Stadium, Kandy
Umpires: Ranmore Martinesz (SL) and Raveendra Wimalasiri (SL)
Player of the match: Glenn Maxwell (Aus)

- Sri Lanka won the toss and elected to field.
- Sachith Pathirana (SL) made his T20I debut.
- Australia scored the highest total in a T20I, beating the previous highest of 260/6 set by Sri Lanka in 2007.
- Glenn Maxwell (Aus) scored his maiden T20I century.
- Glenn Maxwell (Aus) became the first to hit a century in his maiden innings as an opener in a T20I.
- This was Sri Lanka's biggest defeat in terms of runs in a T20I.

=== 2nd T20I ===
9 September 2016
19:00 (D/N)
Scorecard

Sri Lanka; 128/9 (20 overs)	v	Australia; 130/6 (17.5 overs)
Dhananjaya de Silva 62 (50); Adam Zampa 3/16 (4 overs)		Glenn Maxwell 66 (29); Tillakaratne Dilshan 2/8 (2 overs)

Australia won by 4 wickets
R. Premadasa Stadium, Colombo
Umpires: Ranmore Martinesz (SL) and Ruchira Palliyaguruge (SL)
Player of the match: Glenn Maxwell (Aus)

- Sri Lanka won the toss and elected to bat.
- This was Tillakaratne Dilshan's (SL) final international match.
- Glenn Maxwell scored the equal fastest fifty in T20I cricket by an Australian (18 balls).
