= 2016–17 Zimbabwe Tri-Series =

International cricket tournament

Zimbabwe Tri-Nation Series 2016–17
- Zimbabwe Tri Series 2016 - Blue Mountain Achilleion Cup logo
- Date: 14–27 November 2016
- Location: Zimbabwe
- Result: Sri Lanka won the series
- Player of the series: (Sri Lanka) Kusal Mendis
Teams
Zimbabwe	Sri Lanka	West Indies
Captains
Graeme Cremer	Upul Tharanga	Jason Holder
Most runs
Sikandar Raza (163)	Niroshan Dickwella (179)	Evin Lewis (202)
Most wickets
Sean Williams (4)	Asela Gunaratne (8); Nuwan Kulasekara (8)	Jason Holder (9)

The 2016–17 Zimbabwe Tri-Series was a One Day International (ODI) cricket tournament that was held in Zimbabwe in November 2016. It was a tri-nation series between the national representative cricket teams of Zimbabwe, Sri Lanka and the West Indies. The Sri Lankan team were originally scheduled to tour Zimbabwe for two Tests, three ODIs and one Twenty20 International (T20I). However, the ODIs and T20I were replaced by this tri-series.

DRS technology was used for the first time in a limited-overs series in Zimbabwe. This follows its use in the second Test in Zimbabwe's series against Sri Lanka that immediately preceded the tri-series.

Sri Lanka won the tournament by beating Zimbabwe by 6 wickets in the final.

== Squads ==
Zimbabwe	Sri Lanka	West Indies
Graeme Cremer (c); Brian Chari; Elton Chigumbura; Chamu Chibhabha; Tendai Chisoro; Craig Ervine; Hamilton Masakadza; Peter Moor (wk); Christopher Mpofu; Carl Mumba; Tarisai Musakanda; Tinashe Panyangara; Sikandar Raza; Donald Tiripano; Sean Williams	Upul Tharanga (c); Dhananjaya de Silva; Niroshan Dickwella (wk); Asela Gunaratne; Shehan Jayasuriya; Nuwan Kulasekara; Lahiru Kumara; Suranga Lakmal; Kusal Mendis; Sachith Pathirana; Kusal Perera (vc); Nuwan Pradeep; Lakshan Sandakan; Dasun Shanaka; Jeffrey Vandersay	Jason Holder (c); Sulieman Benn (vc); Devendra Bishoo; Carlos Brathwaite; Kraigg Brathwaite; ~~Darren Bravo~~; Jonathan Carter; Johnson Charles; Miguel Cummins; Shane Dowrich; Shannon Gabriel; Shai Hope (wk); ~~Alzarri Joseph~~; Evin Lewis; Jason Mohammed; ~~Sunil Narine~~; Ashley Nurse; Rovman Powell; ~~Marlon Samuels~~

Shane Dowrich and Miguel Cummins were added to the West Indies' squad in place of Marlon Samuels and Alzarri Joseph. Darren Bravo was dropped from the West Indies' squad after he posted a comment on Twitter that the West Indies Cricket Board (WICB) deemed to be "inappropriate and unacceptable". He was replaced by Jason Mohammed. Sunil Narine left the squad for personal reasons and was replaced by Devendra Bishoo.

== Points table ==
Pos	Team	Pld	W	L	T	NR	BP	Pts	NRR
1	Sri Lanka	4	2	1	0	1	1	11	0.488
2	Zimbabwe	4	1	1	1	1	0	8	−1.020
3	West Indies	4	1	2	1	0	1	7	0.315

Source: ESPNcricinfo

Qualified for the Final

== Matches ==
=== 1st ODI ===
14 November 2016
09:30
Scorecard

Zimbabwe; 154 (41.3 overs)	v	Sri Lanka; 155/2 (24.3 overs)
Peter Moor 47 (52); Asela Gunaratne 3/21 (6.3 overs)		Dhananjaya de Silva 78* (75); Chamu Chibhabha 1/18 (2 overs)

Sri Lanka won by 8 wickets
Harare Sports Club, Harare
Umpires: Chettithody Shamshuddin (Ind) and Russell Tiffin (Zim)
Player of the match: Dhananjaya de Silva (SL)

- Sri Lanka won the toss and elected to field.
- Upul Tharanga (SL) played his first ODI match as captain.
- Asela Gunaratne (SL) and Carl Mumba (Zim) both made their ODI debuts.
- Points: Sri Lanka 5, Zimbabwe 0.

=== 2nd ODI ===
16 November 2016
09:30
Scorecard

West Indies; 227 (49.2 overs)	v	Sri Lanka; 165 (43.1 overs)
Jonathan Carter 54 (62); Nuwan Kulasekara 2/37 (10 overs)		Sachith Pathirana 45 (40); Shannon Gabriel 3/31 (8.1 overs)

West Indies won by 62 runs
Harare Sports Club, Harare
Umpires: Marais Erasmus (SA) and Russell Tiffin (Zim)
Player of the match: Jason Holder (WI)

- Sri Lanka won the toss and elected to field.
- Shai Hope, Ashley Nurse and Rovman Powell (WI) all made their ODI debuts.
- Points: West Indies 5, Sri Lanka 0.

=== 3rd ODI ===
19 November 2016
09:30
Scorecard

Zimbabwe; 257 (50 overs)	v	West Indies; 257/8 (50 overs)
Craig Ervine 92 (100); Carlos Brathwaite 4/48 (10 overs)		Shai Hope 101 (120); Donald Tiripano 2/26 (6 overs)

Match tied
Queens Sports Club, Bulawayo
Umpires: Chettithody Shamshuddin (Ind) and Russell Tiffin (Zim)
Player of the match: Shai Hope (WI)

- Zimbabwe won the toss and elected to bat.
- Russell Tiffin (Zim) stood in his 150th ODI as an umpire.
- Shai Hope (WI) scored his first century in ODIs.
- This was the 34th tied ODI match and the first tied ODI match between the two teams.
- Points: Zimbabwe 2, West Indies 2.

=== 4th ODI ===
21 November 2016
09:30
Scorecard

Zimbabwe; 55/2 (13.3 overs)	v	Sri Lanka
Craig Ervine 23* (30); Nuwan Kulasekara 1/17 (5 overs)

No result
Queens Sports Club, Bulawayo
Umpires: Michael Gough (Eng) and Langton Rusere (Zim)

- Zimbabwe won the toss and elected to bat.
- Rain stopped play in Zimbabwe's innings with no further play possible due to a wet outfield.
- Points: Zimbabwe 2, Sri Lanka 2.

=== 5th ODI ===
23 November 2016
09:30
Scorecard

Sri Lanka; 330/7 (50 overs)	v	West Indies; 329/9 (50 overs)
Kusal Mendis 94 (73); Jason Holder 3/57 (10 overs)		Evin Lewis 148 (122); Suranga Lakmal 2/67 (10 overs)

Sri Lanka won by 1 run
Queens Sports Club, Bulawayo
Umpires: Richard Illingworth (Eng) and Jeremiah Matibiri (Zim)
Player of the match: Kusal Mendis (SL)

- West Indies won the toss and elected to field.
- Evin Lewis (WI) scored his first century in ODIs.
- Points: Sri Lanka 4, West Indies 0.

=== 6th ODI ===
25 November 2016
09:30
Scorecard

Zimbabwe; 218/8 (49 overs)	v	West Indies; 124/5 (27.3 overs)
Sikandar Raza 76* (103); Ashley Nurse 3/27 (10 overs)		Jonathan Carter 43* (56); Sean Williams 2/18 (7 overs)

Zimbabwe won by 5 runs (DLS method)
Queens Sports Club, Bulawayo
Umpires: Michael Gough (Eng) and Jeremiah Matibiri (Zim)
Player of the match: Tendai Chisoro (Zim)

- Zimbabwe won the toss and elected to bat.
- Rain stopped play in Zimbabwe's innings with one over being lost.
- Rain stopped play in the West Indies' innings with no further play possible.
- Tendai Chisoro and Sikandar Raza scored record ninth-wicket partnership of 91 not out for Zimbabwe in ODIs.
- Points: Zimbabwe 4, West Indies 0.

=== Final ===
27 November 2016
09:30
Scorecard

Zimbabwe; 160 (36.3 overs)	v	Sri Lanka; 166/4 (37.3 overs)
Tarisai Musakanda 36 (37); Asela Gunaratne 3/10 (4.3 overs)		Kusal Mendis 57 (72); Brian Vitori 3/52 (9 overs)

Sri Lanka won by 6 wickets
Queens Sports Club, Bulawayo
Umpires: Richard Illingworth (Eng) and Jeremiah Matibiri (Zim)
Player of the match: Kusal Mendis (SL)

- Zimbabwe won the toss and elected to bat.
- Tarisai Musakanda (Zim) made his ODI debut.
