= Sri Lankan cricket team in India in 2017–18 =

International cricket tour

	India	Sri Lanka
- Dates: 11 November – 24 December 2017
Captains	Virat Kohli (Tests); Rohit Sharma (ODIs & T20Is)	Dinesh Chandimal (Tests); Thisara Perera (ODIs & T20Is)

Test series
- Result: India won the 3-match series 1–0
Most runs	Virat Kohli (610)	Dinesh Chandimal (366)
Most wickets	Ravichandran Ashwin (12)	Suranga Lakmal (8); Dilruwan Perera (8)
- Player of the series: Virat Kohli (Ind)

One Day International series
- Results: India won the 3-match series 2–1
Most runs	Rohit Sharma (217)	Angelo Mathews (153)
Most wickets	Yuzvendra Chahal (6)	Thisara Perera (5)
- Player of the series: Shikhar Dhawan (Ind)

Twenty20 International series
- Results: India won the 3-match series 3–0
Most runs	Rohit Sharma (162)	Kusal Perera (100)
Most wickets	Yuzvendra Chahal (8)	Dushmantha Chameera (3); Thisara Perera (3); Nuwan Pradeep (3)
- Player of the series: Jaydev Unadkat (Ind)

The Sri Lanka cricket team toured India in November and December 2017. The original schedule had the tour consisting of three Tests, five One Day Internationals (ODIs) and one Twenty20 International (T20I) match starting in February 2018.

In March 2017, Sri Lanka Cricket (SLC) announced the dates for the 2018 Nidahas Trophy, a limited-overs tri-series tournament featuring Sri Lanka, India and Bangladesh. This was scheduled to take place in March 2018. The SLC president Thilanga Sumathipala said that some of the scheduled limited-overs matches fixtures in this series would now be played in the Nidahas Trophy. The revised schedule of the tour now has three Tests, three ODIs and three T20Is. Ahead of the Test series, a two-day tour match was played between the India Board President XI and Sri Lanka.

In August 2017, Board of Control for Cricket in India (BCCI) acting secretary Amitabh Choudhary mentioned that the Tests would be played in Kolkata, Nagpur and Delhi. The ODI venues would be in Dharamshala, Mohali and Visakhapatnam and the three T20 games would be played in Cuttack, Indore and Mumbai. Moreover, Choudhary said that a second reason for Sri Lanka's advanced arrival was the cancellation of the proposed series between India and Pakistan.

In October 2017, Virat Kohli was named as India's captain for the Test series. However, in November 2017, he was rested for the ODIs as well as T20Is in preparation for India's tour to South Africa at the end of the year, with Rohit Sharma named as captain. On 29 November 2017, Thisara Perera was named as Sri Lanka's captain for the ODI and T20I matches, replacing Upul Tharanga.

India won the Test series 1–0, after the first and third matches were drawn. India won the ODI series 2–1, their eighth consecutive series win since beating Zimbabwe in June 2016. India won the T20I series 3–0.

== Squads ==
Tests		ODIs		T20Is	
India	Sri Lanka	India	Sri Lanka	India	Sri Lanka
Virat Kohli (c); Ravichandran Ashwin; Shikhar Dhawan; Ravindra Jadeja; Bhuvneshwar Kumar; Hardik Pandya; Cheteshwar Pujara; Ajinkya Rahane; KL Rahul; Wriddhiman Saha (wk); Mohammed Shami; Vijay Shankar; Ishant Sharma; Rohit Sharma; Murali Vijay; Kuldeep Yadav; Umesh Yadav	Dinesh Chandimal (c); Dhananjaya de Silva; Niroshan Dickwella (wk); Vishwa Fernando; Lahiru Gamage; Rangana Herath; Dimuth Karunaratne; Suranga Lakmal; Angelo Mathews; Dilruwan Perera; Sadeera Samarawickrama; Lakshan Sandakan; Dasun Shanaka; Roshen Silva; Lahiru Thirimanne; Jeffrey Vandersay	Rohit Sharma (c); Jasprit Bumrah; Yuzvendra Chahal; Shikhar Dhawan; MS Dhoni (wk); Shreyas Iyer; Kedar Jadhav; Dinesh Karthik; Siddarth Kaul; Bhuvneshwar Kumar; Manish Pandey; Hardik Pandya; Axar Patel; Ajinkya Rahane; Washington Sundar; Kuldeep Yadav	Thisara Perera (c); Dushmantha Chameera; Akila Dananjaya; Chaturanga de Silva; Dhananjaya de Silva; Niroshan Dickwella (wk); Asela Gunaratne; Danushka Gunathilaka; Suranga Lakmal; Angelo Mathews; Sachith Pathirana; Kusal Perera; Nuwan Pradeep; Sadeera Samarawickrama; Upul Tharanga; Lahiru Thirimanne	Rohit Sharma (c); Jasprit Bumrah; Yuzvendra Chahal; MS Dhoni (wk); Deepak Hooda; Shreyas Iyer; Dinesh Karthik; Manish Pandey; Hardik Pandya; KL Rahul; Mohammed Siraj; Washington Sundar; Basil Thampi; Jaydev Unadkat; Kuldeep Yadav	Thisara Perera (c); Dushmantha Chameera; Akila Dananjaya; Chaturanga de Silva; Niroshan Dickwella; Vishwa Fernando; Asela Gunaratne; Danushka Gunathilaka; Angelo Mathews; Sachith Pathirana; Kusal Perera; Nuwan Pradeep; Dasun Shanaka; Sadeera Samarawickrama; Upul Tharanga

Hardik Pandya was initially named in India's Test squad, but was later withdrawn from the series to manage his workload. Ahead of the second Test, Bhuvneshwar Kumar and Shikhar Dhawan were released from the team for personal reasons. Vijay Shankar was named as Bhuvneshwar Kumar’s replacement in the squad. However, ahead of third Test, Dhawan was added back in India's Test squad. Rangana Herath was ruled out of Sri Lanka's squad for the third Test, with Jeffrey Vandersay replacing him.

Ahead of the first ODI, Kedar Jadhav injured his hamstring and was ruled out of the series. He was replaced by Washington Sundar in India's squad.

During the second T20I, Angelo Mathews injured his hamstring and was ruled out of Sri Lanka's squad for the last T20I.

== Tour match ==
=== Two-day: India Board President XI vs Sri Lanka ===
11–12 November 2017
Scorecard

Sri Lanka	v	India Board President XI
411/9d (88 overs); Sadeera Samarawickrama 74 (77); Sandeep Warrier 2/60 (15 overs)		287/5 (75 overs); Sanju Samson 128 (143); Lahiru Thirimanne 2/22 (6 overs)

Match drawn
Jadavpur University Campus 2nd Ground, Kolkata
Umpires: Pashchim Pathak (Ind) and Krishnaraj Srinath (Ind)

- Indian Board President's XI won the toss and elected to field.
- 15 players per side (11 batting, 11 fielding)

== Test series ==
=== 1st Test ===
16–20 November 2017
Scorecard

India	v	Sri Lanka
172 (59.3 overs); Cheteshwar Pujara 52 (117); Suranga Lakmal 4/26 (19 overs)		294 (83.4 overs); Rangana Herath 67 (105); Bhuvneshwar Kumar 4/88 (27 overs)
352/8d (88.4 overs); Virat Kohli 104* (119); Dasun Shanaka 3/76 (22 overs)		75/7 (26.3 overs); Niroshan Dickwella 27 (36); Bhuvneshwar Kumar 4/8 (11 overs)

Match drawn
Eden Gardens, Kolkata
Umpires: Richard Kettleborough (Eng), Nigel Llong (Eng) and Joel Wilson (WI)
Player of the match: Bhuvneshwar Kumar (Ind)

- Sri Lanka won the toss and elected to field.
- Only 11.5 overs were bowled on day 1 and 21 overs on day 2 due to rain and bad light. Play also ended early on days 3, 4 and 5 due to bad light.
- Richard Kettleborough (Eng) was replaced by Joel Wilson (WI) as the on-field umpire from day 3 onwards due to illness.
- Cheteshwar Pujara (Ind) became the third batsman for India, and ninth overall, to bat on all five days of a Test.
- Virat Kohli (Ind) scored his 50th century in international cricket and became the joint fastest batsman along with Hashim Amla (SA) to score 50 international centuries.
- Virat Kohli also equaled Sunil Gavaskar's record for the most Test centuries as captain of India.

=== 2nd Test ===
24–28 November 2017 (Note: While five days of play were scheduled for each Test, the second Test reached a result within four days.)
Scorecard

Sri Lanka	v	India
205 (79.1 overs); Dinesh Chandimal 57 (122); Ravichandran Ashwin 4/67 (28.1 overs)		610/6d (176.1 overs); Virat Kohli 213 (267); Dilruwan Perera 3/202 (45 overs)
166 (49.3 overs); Dinesh Chandimal 61 (82); Ravichandran Ashwin 4/63 (17.3 overs)

India won by an innings and 239 runs
Vidarbha Cricket Association Stadium, Nagpur
Umpires: Richard Kettleborough (Eng) and Joel Wilson (WI)
Player of the match: Virat Kohli (Ind)

- Sri Lanka won the toss and elected to bat.
- Dinesh Chandimal (SL) passed 3,000 runs in Tests and Dimuth Karunaratne (SL) scored his 1,000th run in Tests in 2017.
- Murali Vijay (Ind) scored his 10th century in Tests.
- Cheteshwar Pujara (Ind) scored his 1,000th run in Tests in 2017.
- Virat Kohli (Ind) became the first captain to score 10 international hundreds in a calendar year and he also scored the most Test centuries as a captain of India (12).
- Virat Kohli equalled Brian Lara's record of the most double centuries as captain in Tests (5).
- This was Sri Lanka's 100th loss, India's joint-biggest win and Sri Lanka's biggest loss by an innings in Tests.
- Ravichandran Ashwin (Ind) took the fewest matches to take 300 wickets in Tests (54).

=== 3rd Test ===
2–6 December 2017
Scorecard

India	v	Sri Lanka
536/7d (127.5 overs); Virat Kohli 243 (287); Lakshan Sandakan 4/167 (33.5 overs)		373 (135.3 overs); Dinesh Chandimal 164 (361); Ravichandran Ashwin 3/90 (35 overs)
246/5d (52.2 overs); Shikhar Dhawan 67 (91); Dhananjaya de Silva 1/31 (5 overs)		299/5 (103 overs); Dhananjaya de Silva 119* (219); Ravindra Jadeja 3/81 (38 overs)

Match drawn
Feroz Shah Kotla Ground, Delhi
Umpires: Nigel Llong (Eng) and Joel Wilson (WI)
Player of the match: Virat Kohli (Ind)

- India won the toss and elected to bat.
- Roshen Silva (SL) made his Test debut.
- Virat Kohli (Ind) made his 20th century, scored his 3,000th run as captain of India and his 5,000th run in Tests. This was his 10th century against Sri Lanka in all forms of international cricket in 2017, the most by one player against a single team in a calendar year.
- Kohli also became the fastest batsman to reach 16,000 international runs and became the first Test captain to score centuries in each game of a three-match Test series.
- Virat Kohli and Murali Vijay (Ind) made the highest partnership for India for any wicket against Sri Lanka in Tests (283).
- Dilruwan Perera (SL) became the fastest bowler for Sri Lanka, in terms of matches played, to take 100 wickets in Tests (25).
- Virat Kohli (Ind) scored his sixth double century, his third in 2017 and the most as captain in Tests (6).
- Dhananjaya de Silva's (SL) unbeaten 119 was the highest fourth-innings score by a visiting batsman in India.

==== Smog ====
During the second day of the third Test, the Smog in Delhi forced the Sri Lanka cricketers to halt play and wear anti-pollution masks. Cricketer Lahiru Gamage was reported to have breathing shortness. Nic Pothas, coach of the Sri Lankan cricket team, reported that Dhananjaya de Silva and Suranga Lakmal had vomited regularly due to the severe pollution at the ground. There was a haltage of play between 12:32pm to 12:49pm, which caused Indian coach Ravi Shastri to come out to consult with the on-field umpires. BCCI president C. K. Khanna accused the Sri Lankan team of making fuss while Indian spectators called the team "melodramatic". On day 4, India's Mohammed Shami was also seen vomiting on the field.

Following the match, both participating countries criticised the choice to play the Test in Delhi with the high levels of pollution. The Sri Lanka manager Asanka Gurusinha said that both teams were using oxygen cylinders in their dressing rooms due to breathing difficulties, and suggested the use of air-quality meters in future fixtures. President of the Indian Medical Association, KK Agarwal, said that playing in such conditions could result in lung and heart disease, and recommended the inclusion of atmospheric pollution as a factor in the assessment criteria for a match.

== ODI series ==
=== 1st ODI ===
10 December 2017
11:30 (D/N)
Scorecard

India; 112 (38.2 overs)	v	Sri Lanka; 113/3 (20.4 overs)
MS Dhoni 65 (87); Suranga Lakmal 4/13 (10 overs)		Upul Tharanga 49 (46); Jasprit Bumrah 1/32 (7 overs)

Sri Lanka won by 7 wickets
Himachal Pradesh Cricket Association Stadium, Dharamshala
Umpires: Anil Chaudhary (Ind) and Simon Fry (Aus)

- Sri Lanka won the toss and elected to field.
- Shreyas Iyer (Ind) made his ODI debut.
- Rohit Sharma (Ind) and Thisara Perera (SL) both made their ODI captaincy debuts.
- India lost their first five wickets for 16 runs, their lowest total in ODIs, and their top five batsman aggregated 13 runs, also their lowest total in ODIs.
- Dinesh Karthik (Ind) faced the most deliveries by an India batsman before being dismissed for a duck in ODIs (18).

=== 2nd ODI ===
13 December 2017
11:30 (D/N)
Scorecard

India; 392/4 (50 overs)	v	Sri Lanka; 251/8 (50 overs)
Rohit Sharma 208* (153); Thisara Perera 3/80 (8 overs)		Angelo Mathews 111* (132); Yuzvendra Chahal 3/60 (10 overs)

India won by 141 runs
Punjab Cricket Association IS Bindra Stadium, Mohali
Umpires: C. K. Nandan (Ind) and Paul Reiffel (Aus)
Player of the match: Rohit Sharma (Ind)

- Sri Lanka won the toss and elected to field
- Washington Sundar (Ind) made his ODI debut.
- This was the 100th time that India had scored 300 runs or more in ODIs.
- Rohit Sharma (Ind) became the first batsman to score three double centuries in ODIs and also became the first batsman to score two double centuries against the same opposition.
- Nuwan Pradeep (SL) conceded the joint third-highest number of runs in an innings in an ODI (106).
- Angelo Mathews (SL) became the fourth player for Sri Lanka to score 5,000 runs and take 100 wickets in ODIs.

=== 3rd ODI ===
17 December 2017
13:30 (D/N)
Scorecard

Sri Lanka; 215 (44.5 overs)	v	India; 219/2 (32.1 overs)
Upul Tharanga 95 (82); Kuldeep Yadav 3/42 (10 overs)		Shikhar Dhawan 100* (85); Thisara Perera 1/25 (5 overs)

India won by 8 wickets
Dr. Y.S. Rajasekhara Reddy ACA-VDCA Cricket Stadium, Visakhapatnam
Umpires: Simon Fry (Aus) and Nitin Menon (Ind)
Player of the match: Kuldeep Yadav (Ind)

- India won the toss and elected to field.
- Shikhar Dhawan (Ind) scored his 4,000th run in ODIs.

== T20I series ==
=== 1st T20I ===
20 December 2017
19:00 (N)
Scorecard

India; 180/3 (20 overs)	v	Sri Lanka; 87 (16 overs)
KL Rahul 61 (48); Angelo Mathews 1/19 (3 overs)		Upul Tharanga 23 (16); Yuzvendra Chahal 4/23 (4 overs)

India won by 93 runs
Barabati Stadium, Cuttack
Umpires: Nitin Menon (Ind) and C. K. Nandan (Ind)
Player of the match: Yuzvendra Chahal (Ind)

- Sri Lanka won the toss and elected to field.
- Vishwa Fernando (SL) made his T20I debut.
- This was Sri Lanka's 100th T20I.
- Rohit Sharma (Ind) captained India for the first time in T20Is. He also became the second India batsman after Virat Kohli to score 1,500 runs in T20Is.
- MS Dhoni (Ind) affected the most dismissals in T20Is (74).
- In terms of runs, this was both India's biggest win and Sri Lanka's biggest defeat in T20Is.

=== 2nd T20I ===
22 December 2017
19:00 (N)
Scorecard

India; 260/5 (20 overs)	v	Sri Lanka; 172 (17.2 overs)
Rohit Sharma 118 (43); Thisara Perera 2/49 (4 overs)		Kusal Perera 77 (37); Yuzvendra Chahal 4/52 (4 overs)

India won by 88 runs
Holkar Stadium, Indore
Umpires: Anil Chaudhary (Ind) and C. K. Nandan (Ind)
Player of the match: Rohit Sharma (Ind)

- Sri Lanka won the toss and elected to field.
- This was the first T20I to be played at this venue.
- This was India's highest score in T20Is and it was the joint-second highest team total in T20Is.
- Rohit Sharma (Ind) scored the joint-fastest century in T20Is (35 balls).
- Rohit Sharma became the first batsman for India to score two centuries in T20Is and he also scored the highest total by a batsman for India in T20Is.
- KL Rahul and Rohit Sharma made the highest opening partnership for India in T20Is (165).

=== 3rd T20I ===
24 December 2017
19:00 (N)
Scorecard

Sri Lanka; 135/7 (20 overs)	v	India; 139/5 (19.2 overs)
Asela Gunaratne 36 (37); Jaydev Unadkat 2/15 (4 overs)		Manish Pandey 32 (29); Dushmantha Chameera 2/22 (4 overs)

India won by 5 wickets
Wankhede Stadium, Mumbai
Umpires: Anil Chaudhary (Ind) and Nitin Menon (Ind)
Player of the match: Jaydev Unadkat (Ind)

- India won the toss and elected to field.
- Washington Sundar (Ind) made his T20I debut. At the age of 18 years and 80 days, he became the youngest player to debut for India in T20Is.
