= Pakistani cricket team in Sri Lanka in 2014 =

Pakistan in Sri Lanka in 2014
	Sri Lanka	Pakistan
- Dates: 6 August – 30 August 2014
Captains	Angelo Mathews	Misbah-ul-Haq

Test series
- Result: Sri Lanka won the 2-match series 2–0
Most runs	Kumar Sangakkara (323)	Sarfraz Ahmed (265)
Most wickets	Rangana Herath (23)	Junaid Khan(9)
- Player of the series: Rangana Herath (SL)

One Day International series
- Results: Sri Lanka won the 3-match series 2–1
Most runs	Angelo Mathews (182)	Fawad Alam (130)
Most wickets	Thisara Perera (9)	Wahab Riaz (8)
- Player of the series: Thisara Perera (SL)

The Pakistan national cricket team toured Sri Lanka in August 2014 to play a two-match Test series against the Sri Lankan national cricket team followed by a three-match series of One Day Internationals (ODI). Sri Lanka won the Test series 2–0 and the ODI series 2–1.

This was the final Test series for Sri Lankan batsmen Mahela Jayawardene after he announced his retirement from Test cricket in order to focus on One Day cricket until the 2015 Cricket World Cup.

In the first innings of the second Test, Sri Lankan bowler Rangana Herath took nine wickets for 127 runs, the best figures for a left-arm bowler in Test cricket.

== Squads ==
Tests		ODIs	
Sri Lanka	Pakistan	Sri Lanka	Pakistan
Angelo Mathews (c); Lahiru Thirimanne (vc); Upul Tharanga; Kaushal Silva; Kumar Sangakkara; Mahela Jayawardene; Niroshan Dickwella; Kithuruwan Vithanage; Rangana Herath; Dilruwan Perera; Suranga Lakmal (withdrawn); Shaminda Eranga; Dhammika Prasad; Chanaka Welagedara; Nuwan Pradeep; Dimuth Karunaratne; Binura Fernando	Misbah-ul-Haq (C); Ahmed Shehzad; Khurram Manzoor; Shan Masood; Azhar Ali; Younis Khan; Asad Shafiq; Umar Akmal; Sarfraz Ahmed (wk); Saeed Ajmal; Abdur Rehman; Mohammad Talha; Junaid Khan; Rahat Ali; Wahab Riaz	Angelo Mathews (C); Lahiru Thirimanne (VC); Tillakaratne Dilshan; Upul Tharanga; Kumar Sangakkara (wk); Mahela Jayawardene; Dinesh Chandimal; Ashan Priyanjan; Lasith Malinga; Nuwan Kulasekara; Dhammika Prasad; Rangana Herath; Seekkuge Prasanna; Suraj Randiv; Thisara Perera	Misbah-ul-Haq (C); Ahmed Shehzad; Sharjeel Khan; Mohammad Hafeez; Sohaib Maqsood; Younis Khan; Shahid Afridi; Umar Akmal; Fawad Alam; Sarfraz Ahmed (wk); Saeed Ajmal; Anwar Ali; Mohammad Irfan; Mohammad Talha; Junaid Khan; Zulfiqar Babar; Wahab Riaz

== Tour matches ==
=== One-day: Sri Lanka Cricket Board President's XI v Pakistanis ===
20 August 2014
10:00
Scorecard

Sri Lanka Cricket Board President's XI; 325/7 (50 overs)	v	Pakistanis; 290/8 (46.2 overs)
Ashan Priyanjan 65 (65); Mohammad Hafeez 4/44 (10 overs)		Mohammad Hafeez 54 (60); Thisara Perera 2/51 (9 overs)

Sri Lanka Cricket Board President's XI won by 13 runs (D/L method)
Tyronne Fernando Stadium, Moratuwa
Umpires: Lyndon Hannibal (SL) and Pradeep Udawatta (SL)

- Sri Lanka Cricket Board President's XI won the toss and elected to bat
- Pakistani innings stopped at 46.2 overs due to bad light

== Test series ==
=== 1st Test ===
6–10 August 2014
Scorecard

Pakistan	v	Sri Lanka
451 (140.5 overs); Younis Khan 177 (331); Dilruwan Perera 5/137 (31.5 overs)		533/9d (163.4 overs); Kumar Sangakkara 221 (425); Saeed Ajmal 5/166 (59.1 overs)
180 (80.2 overs); Sarfraz Ahmed 52* (70); Rangana Herath 6/48 (30.2 overs)		99/3 (16.2 overs); Mahela Jayawardene 26 (35); Junaid Khan 2/55 (8 overs)

Sri Lanka won by 7 wickets
Galle International Stadium, Galle
Umpires: Ian Gould (Eng) & Bruce Oxenford (Aus)
Player of the match: Rangana Herath (SL)

- Pakistan won the toss and elected to bat
- Rain reduced day 3 to 46 overs

=== 2nd Test ===
14–18 August 2014
Scorecard

Sri Lanka	v	Pakistan
320 (98 overs); Upul Tharanga 92 (179); Junaid Khan 4/69 (21 overs)		332 (97 overs); Sarfraz Ahmed 103 (197); Rangana Herath 9/127(48 overs)
282 (109 overs); Kumar Sangakkara 59 (130); Riaz 3/76 (25 ov), Ajmal 3/89 (46 ov)		165 (52.1 overs); Sarfraz Ahmed 55 (89); Rangana Herath 5/57 (22.1 overs)

Sri Lanka won by 105 runs
Sinhalese Sports Club Ground, Colombo
Umpires: Ian Gould (Eng) & Richard Illingworth (Eng)
Player of the match: Rangana Herath (SL)

- Sri Lanka won the toss and chose to bat.
- Sarfraz Ahmed (Pak) scored his first century in Tests.
- This was final test match for Mahela Jayawardene (Sri Lanka).

== ODI series ==
=== 1st ODI ===
23 August 2014
Scorecard

Sri Lanka; 275/7 (45 overs)	v	Pakistan; 277/6 (44.5 overs)
Angelo Mathews 89 (85); Wahab Riaz 3/50 (9 overs)		Sohaib Maqsood 89* (73); Thisara Perera 2/43 (7 overs)

Pakistan won by 4 wickets (D/L)
Mahinda Rajapaksa International Stadium, Hambantota
Umpires: Ruchira Palliyaguruge (SL) and S. Ravi (Ind)
Player of the match: Sohaib Maqsood (Pak)

- Pakistan won the toss and elected to field.
- Rain reduced match to 45 overs

=== 2nd ODI ===
26 August 2014
Scorecard

Sri Lanka; 310/9 (50 overs)	v	Pakistan; 233 (43.5 overs)
Angelo Mathews 93 (115); Wahab Riaz 4/65 (10 overs)		Mohammad Hafeez 63 (49); Thisara Perera 3/19 (3 overs)

Sri Lanka won by 77 runs
Mahinda Rajapaksa International Stadium, Hambantota
Umpires: Steve Davis (Aus) and Ranmore Martinesz (SL)
Player of the match: Thisara Perera (SL)

- Sri Lanka won the toss and elected to bat.

=== 3rd ODI ===
30 August 2014
Scorecard

Pakistan; 102 (32.1 overs)	v	Sri Lanka; 104/3 (18.2 overs)
Fawad Alam 38* (73); Thisara Perera 4/34 (8 overs)		Tillakaratne Dilshan 50* (55); Saeed Ajmal 1/10 (4 overs)

Sri Lanka won by 7 wickets (D/L)
Rangiri Dambulla International Stadium, Dambulla
Umpires: Ruchira Palliyaguruge (SL) and S. Ravi (Ind)
Player of the match: Thisara Perera (SL)

- Pakistan won the toss and elected to bat.
- Match reduced to 48 overs per side due to rain. Sri Lanka set a target of 101 to win.
