= Sri Lankan cricket team in Zimbabwe in 2016–17 =

International cricket tour

| | Zimbabwe | Sri Lanka |
- Dates: 29 October – 10 November 2016
| Captains | Graeme Cremer | Rangana Herath |

Test series
- Result: Sri Lanka won the 2-match series 2–0
| Most runs | Graeme Cremer (153); Sean Williams (153) | Dimuth Karunaratne (280) |
| Most wickets | Graeme Cremer (11) | Rangana Herath (19) |
- Player of the series: Dimuth Karunaratne (SL)

Sri Lankan national cricket team toured Zimbabwe from October to November 2016. The tour was originally scheduled to consist of a two Test matches, three One Day Internationals (ODIs) and a single Twenty20 international (T20I), but in September 2016 the one-day matches were replaced by a triangular series featuring Zimbabwe, Sri Lanka and the West Indies and that the tour of Zimbabwe would be reduced to just the two Test matches. Sri Lanka won the series 2–0.

Sri Lanka last played Zimbabwe in a Test match in 2004. The first Test of the series was the 100th Test match played by Zimbabwe. The second Test of the series used the Decision Review System. This was the first time the technology was used in a game in Zimbabwe, having previously been unavailable due to cost.

== Squads ==
| Zimbabwe | Sri Lanka |
|---|---|
| Graeme Cremer (c); Regis Chakabva; Brian Chari; Michael Chinouya; Craig Ervine; Hamilton Masakadza; Tino Mawoyo; Peter Moor; Christopher Mpofu; Carl Mumba; Tarisai Musakanda; Taurai Muzarabani; Sikandar Raza; Donald Tiripano; Malcolm Waller; Sean Williams | Rangana Herath (c); ~~Angelo Mathews (c)~~; Niroshan Dickwella; Lahiru Gamage; Asela Gunaratne; Dimuth Karunaratne; Lahiru Kumara; Suranga Lakmal; Kasun Madushanka; Kusal Mendis; Dilruwan Perera; Kusal Perera; Lakshan Sandakan; Kaushal Silva; Dhananjaya de Silva; Upul Tharanga |

Angelo Mathews was ruled out of the tour due to injury and was replaced as captain by Rangana Herath.

== Test series ==
=== 1st Test ===
29 October–2 November 2016
Scorecard

| Sri Lanka | v | Zimbabwe |
| 537 (155 overs); Kusal Perera 110 (121); Graeme Cremer 4/142 (39 overs) | | 373 (107.5 overs); Graeme Cremer 102* (207); Suranga Lakmal 3/69 (21.5 overs) |
| 247/6d (61.5 overs); Dimuth Karunaratne 110 (173); Carl Mumba 4/50 (11.5 overs) | | 186 (90.3 overs); Graeme Cremer 43 (144); Dilruwan Perera 3/34 (15.3 overs) |

Sri Lanka won by 225 runs
Harare Sports Club, Harare
Umpires: Simon Fry (Aus) and Ian Gould (Eng)
Player of the match: Graeme Cremer (Zim)

- Sri Lanka won the toss and elected to bat.
- Rain stopped play shortly after tea on day 4, with no further play possible.
- This was Zimbabwe's 100th Test.
- Rangana Herath (SL) played his first Test match as captain.
- Asela Gunaratne, Lahiru Kumara (SL) and Carl Mumba (Zim) all made their Test debuts.
- Kusal Perera (SL) scored his first Test century.
- Graeme Cremer (Zim) scored his first Test century.

=== 2nd Test ===
6–10 November 2016
Scorecard

| Sri Lanka | v | Zimbabwe |
| 504 (144.4 overs); Dhananjaya de Silva 127 (245); Donald Tiripano 3/91 (32 overs) | | 272 (82.1 overs); Brian Chari 80 (158); Rangana Herath 5/89 (26 overs) |
| 258/9d (81.4 overs); Dimuth Karunaratne 88 (208); Graeme Cremer 4/91 (21.4 overs) | | 233 (58 overs); Craig Ervine 72 (121); Rangana Herath 8/63 (23 overs) |

Sri Lanka won by 257 runs
Harare Sports Club, Harare
Umpires: Simon Fry (Aus) and Ian Gould (Eng)
Player of the match: Rangana Herath (SL)

- Zimbabwe won the toss and elected to field.
- This was the first time the Decision Review System (DRS) was used in Zimbabwe.
- Asela Gunaratne (SL) scored his first Test century.
- Rangana Herath (SL) became the third bowler to take a five wicket haul against all the Test playing nations.
- Rangana Herath (SL) took his 350th Test wicket when he dismissed Carl Mumba.
- Rangana Herath (SL) took the most wickets as a captain in a two-match series (19).
