= Vishwa Fernando =

Sri Lankan cricketer (born 1991)

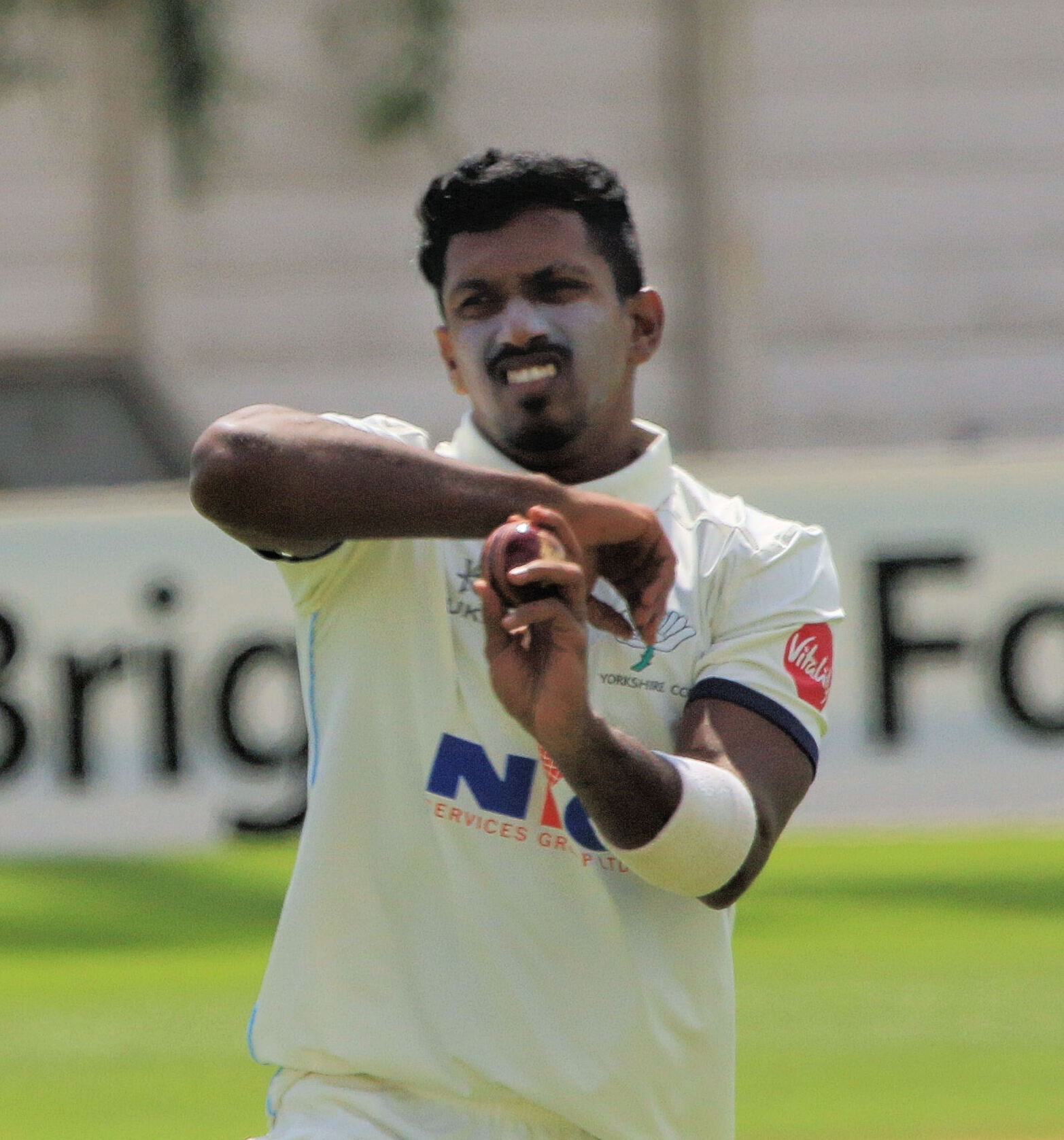
- Fernando playing for Yorkshire in 2023

Personal information
- Full name: Muthuthanthrige Vishwa Thilina Fernando
- Born: 18 September 1991 (age 35); Colombo, Sri Lanka
- Height: 5 ft 10 in (1.78 m)
- Batting: Right-handed
- Bowling: Left-arm medium-fast
- Role: Bowler
- Relatives: Nuwanidu Fernando (brother)

International information
- National side: Sri Lanka (2016—Present)
- Test debut (cap 137): 4 August 2016 v Australia
- Last Test: 25 June 2025 v Bangladesh
- ODI debut (cap 182): 20 August 2017 v India
- Last ODI: 6 March 2019 v South Africa
- Only T20I (cap 74): 20 December 2017 v India

Domestic team information
- Years: Team
- 2012–2016: Bloomfield Cricket and Athletic Club
- 2020: Kandy Tuskers
- 2023–present: Chattogram Challengers
- 2023: Durham
- 2024: Yorkshire
- 2025: Warwickshire

Career statistics
Competition	Test	ODI	T20I	FC
Matches	27	8	1	129
Runs scored	159	30	2	784
Batting average	6.91	15.0	–	9.22
100s/50s	–/–	–/–	–/–	–/–
Top score	38	7*	2	41
Balls bowled	4272	297	12	16575
Wickets	79	5	–	349
Bowling average	32.07	67.40	-	29.22
5 wickets in innings	1	–	–	11
10 wickets in match	–	–	–	–
Best bowling	5/101	1/35	–	5/14
Catches/stumpings	7/–	–/–	–/–	39/–
- Source: ESPNcricinfo, 4 April 2025

Muthuthanthrige Vishwa Thilina Fernando (born 18 September 1991), commonly as Vishwa Fernando, is a professional Sri Lankan cricketer, who represents the national side in all three formats. He had his education in St. Sebastian's College, Moratuwa. He is the elder brother of the emerging cricketer Nuwanidu Fernando.

== Early and domestic career ==
He played in the tour match between Sri Lanka Board President's XI vs Indian national cricket team in August 2015 and was called up for the 15-man squad for the three-match series. In July 2016 he was named in Sri Lanka's Test squad for their series against Australia.

In March 2018, he was named in Colombo's squad for the 2017–18 Super Four Provincial Tournament. The following month, he was also named in Colombo's squad for the 2018 Super Provincial One Day Tournament.

In August 2018, he was named in Kandy's squad the 2018 SLC T20 League. In March 2019, he was named in Dambulla's squad for the 2019 Super Provincial One Day Tournament. In August 2021, he was named in the SLC Greens team for the 2021 SLC Invitational T20 League tournament.

== International career ==
=== Early years ===
Despite he has been a regular contender for the international cricket in many times, he could not play any match due to heavy fast bowling attack Sri Lanka had. But, when all four major fast bowlers were injured; Dhammika Prasad, Nuwan Pradeep, Dushmantha Chameera and Suranga Lakmal, Fernando played his debut Test match in the second Test against Australia on 4 August 2016 as the main pacer. In his first over, he took the wicket of Joe Burns. In rest of the match, he did not ball at all, where Sri Lankan spinners dominated the whole match by taking 19 wickets in two Australian innings. However, Sri Lanka won the match by 229 runs, to secure the Warne-Muralitharan Trophy for the first time.

In August 2017, he was named in Sri Lanka's One Day International (ODI) squad for their series against India. He made his ODI debut for Sri Lanka against India on 20 August 2017. He took his first ODI wicket in third match, when he dismissed Virat Kohli. In October 2017, he was named in Sri Lanka's Twenty20 International (T20I) squad for their series against Pakistan. He made his T20I debut for Sri Lanka against India on 20 December 2017. However, he bowled only two overs and did not take a wicket.

In May 2018, he was one of 33 cricketers to be awarded a national contract by Sri Lanka Cricket ahead of the 2018–19 season.

=== Test career ===
In February 2019, he was called up to the squad for the second Test against Australia due to injuries to main pace bowlers.

On 16 February 2019 against South Africa, Fernando along with Kusal Perera formed a 78-run partnership to win the match by one wicket. It was the highest last-wicket stand in a successful run chase in a Test match. It was Sri Lanka's second one wicket win in Tests. In the course, Perera scored a match winning 153 not out, which was the highest by a Sri Lankan batsman in a successful chase in a Test match. Bowling, he took four wicket hauls in both innings.

In second Test at Port Elizabeth, Fernando led the bowling attack again, where he dismissed Hashim Amla for a golden duck. This was Amla's first international golden duck as well. He took three wickets in the first innings and one wicket in second innings. Sri Lanka won the match and sealed the series 2-0. They were the first Asian team to win a Test series in South Africa. Fernando finished the series as the highest wicket-taker with 12 wickets at an average of 18.91.

In January 2021, in the second Test against South Africa, Fernando took his first five-wicket haul in Test cricket.
