= Lakshan Sandakan =

Sri Lankan cricketer (born 1991)

Lakshan Sandakan ලක්ෂාන් සඳකැන්
Personal information
- Full name: Paththamperuma Arachchige Don Lakshan Rangika Sandakan
- Born: 10 June 1991 (age 35); Ragama, Sri Lanka
- Height: 5 ft 6 in (168 cm)
- Batting: Right-handed
- Bowling: Slow left-arm wrist-spin
- Role: Bowler

International information
- National side: Sri Lanka (2016–2021)
- Test debut (cap 136): 26 July 2016 v Australia
- Last Test: 23 November 2018 v England
- ODI debut (cap 174): 21 August 2016 v Australia
- Last ODI: 20 July 2021 v India
- T20I debut (cap 69): 22 January 2017 v South Africa
- Last T20I: 26 June 2021 v England

Domestic team information
- Years: Team
- CCC
- Saracens Sports Club
- Southern Express CC

Career statistics
Competition	Test	ODI	T20I	FC
Matches	11	31	20	93
Runs scored	117	64	23	1,316
Batting average	10.63	5.33	7.66	13.56
100s/50s	0/0	0/0	0/0	0/2
Top score	25	16*	10	64
Balls bowled	2,063	1,488	460	13,582
Wickets	37	27	23	314
Bowling average	34.48	57.00	24.21	27.34
5 wickets in innings	2	0	0	13
10 wickets in match	0	0	0	1
Best bowling	5/95	4/52	4/23	7/70
Catches/stumpings	6/–	8/–	6/–	56/–
- Source: Cricinfo, 21 March 2025

Paththamperuma Arachchige Don Lakshan Rangika Sandakan, commonly known as Lakshan Sandakan (Sinhala: ලක්ෂාන් සඳකැන්, [lakʃa:n saⁿd̪əkæn] (Note: [ⁿd̪] is a Prenasalized consonant.); born 10 June 1991), is a professional Sri Lankan cricketer who plays for the national team in all three formats of the game. He is a past pupil of De Mazenod College, Kandana.

== Domestic career ==
Domestically he is a first-class cricketer who plays for Colombo Cricket Club. He took the most wickets in the 2015–16 Premier League Tournament, with a total of 52 dismissals from 10 matches and 18 innings.

In March 2018, he was named in Colombo's squad for the 2017–18 Super Four Provincial Tournament. The following month, he was also named in Colombo's squad for the 2018 Super Provincial One Day Tournament. He was the leading wicket-taker for Colombo in the tournament, with twelve dismissals in five matches.

In August 2018, he was named in Dambulla's squad the 2018 SLC T20 League. In March 2019, he was named in Dambulla's squad for the 2019 Super Provincial One Day Tournament. In October 2020, he was drafted by the Galle Gladiators for the inaugural edition of the Lanka Premier League. In August 2021, he was named in the SLC Greens team for the 2021 SLC Invitational T20 League tournament. In November 2021, he was selected to play for the Colombo Stars following the players' draft for the 2021 Lanka Premier League. In July 2022, he was signed by the Galle Gladiators for the third edition of the Lanka Premier League.

== International career ==
In July 2016 he was named in Sri Lanka's Test squad for their series against Australia. On 26 July 2016 he made his Test debut for Sri Lanka against Australia.

In the first innings, Sandakan took his first Test wicket by bowling Mitchell Marsh. He took 4 for 58 runs in the first innings and 3 for 49 in the second innings. His match figures of 7 for 107 were the best by a slow left-arm wrist-spin on Test debut. Sri Lanka won the match by 106 runs giving them only their second win against Australia in 27 matches.

He made his One Day International debut for Sri Lanka against Australia on 21 August 2016. He took his first ODI wicket by caught Matthew Wade in his first over.

In January 2017 he was named in Sri Lanka's Twenty20 International (T20I) squad for their series against South Africa. He made his T20I debut for Sri Lanka against South Africa on 22 January 2017, taking a wicket with his first delivery. He was the first Sri Lankan to achieve this feat.

On 2 July 2017, Sandakan was brought into the second ODI match against Zimbabwe. Sandakan took four wickets in the match, which Sri Lanka won by 7 wickets. He was adjudged his first man of the match award for bowling performance.

He took his first five-wicket haul on day two of the third Test against India at Pallekele International Stadium. He became the first slow left-arm wrist-spin bowler for Sri Lanka to take a five-wicket haul in a Test innings. His figures did not held Sri Lanka to win the match due to poor batting performances in both innings. India won the match by an innings and 171 runs, and whitewashed Sri Lanka for the first time in tests as well.

Sandakan played third Test against India at Delhi. Though he took four wickets in the first innings, he conceded more than 100 runs to the opposition. With few interruptions in the test due to air pollution, match was ended quiet early in first two days. While batting, Sandakan helped skipper Dinesh Chandimal to reach his century to 150 by hanging at the other end as the final wicket.

In May 2018, he was one of 33 cricketers to be awarded a national contract by Sri Lanka Cricket ahead of the 2018–19 season. On 1 October 2021, he was added to Sri Lanka's squad for the 2021 ICC Men's T20 World Cup.

== Personal life ==
Sandakan began playing cricket at the age of 17 and was educated at Mattumagala Karunaratne Buddhist College and De Mazenod College.

Married Wanshika Ketipearachchi on 2022

Personal life

== See also ==
- List of bowlers who have taken a wicket with their first ball in a format of international cricket
