= Ranmore Martinesz =

Sri Lankan cricketer and umpire

Personal information
- Full name: Ranmore Etholson John Martinesz
- Born: 24 June 1967 (age 59); Colombo, Sri Lanka
- Batting: Right-handed
- Bowling: Right-arm medium
- Role: Bowler

Domestic team information
- Years: Team
- 1994–1995: Sebastianites
- FC debut: 16 December 1994 Sebastianites v Kurunegala Youth Cricket Club
- Last FC: 10 February 1995 Sebastianites v Galle Cricket Club

Umpiring information
- Tests umpired: 8 (2013–2016)
- ODIs umpired: 46 (2010–2018)
- T20Is umpired: 29 (2010–2018)
- WODIs umpired: 14 (1999–2013)
- WT20Is umpired: 21 (2010–2022)

Career statistics
Competition	First-class
Matches	4
Runs scored	98
Batting average	16.33
100s/50s	0/1
Top score	66
Balls bowled	408
Wickets	4
Bowling average	62.75
5 wickets in innings	0
10 wickets in match	0
Best bowling	1/26
Catches/stumpings	2/–
- Source: CricketArchive, 27 October 2018

Ranmore Etholson John Martinesz (born 24 June 1967) is a Sri Lanka umpire and a former first-class cricketer. Martinesz played first-class cricket for the Moratuwa-based Sebastianites Cricket and Athletic Club. His career was short, with him making just four first-class appearances.

== Umpiring career ==
Martinesz has proved himself an umpire worthy of being recognized at international level and be included in the ICC's International Panel of Umpires in the near future. For the past three years he has officiated as third umpire in Test matches and ODIs. His most important assignment was umpiring the Euro Asia Cup one-day final between India and Pakistan at Abu Dhabi in front of a crowd of 50,000. Apart from that he has officiated Intercontinental matches at Nepal and in 2003 umpired matches in Bangladesh's domestic tournament. Martinesz was forced to take up umpiring due to a persistent back injury which cut short his career as a cricketer. A fast bowling all-rounder he had a distinguished career at St. Peter's College finishing as runner-up best bowler in 1985 and then being selected to play for Sri Lanka Under 19 against Australia under 19 in 1985 and for Sri Lanka under 23 against Pakistan under 23 in 1987/88. He represented SSC, Negombo CC and Sebastianites in the Premier tournament before eventually retiring from the game in 1994. He took up umpiring in 1996 and was promoted to the Premier division in 2000.

He was selected as one of the twenty umpires to stand in matches during the 2015 Cricket World Cup. In January 2018, he was named as one of the seventeen on-field umpires for the 2018 Under-19 Cricket World Cup.

== See also ==
- List of Test cricket umpires
- List of One Day International cricket umpires
- List of Twenty20 International cricket umpires
