= Asela Gunaratne =

Sri Lankan cricketer

Personal information
- Full name: Downdegedara Asela Sampath Gunaratne
- Born: 8 January 1986 (age 40); Kandy, Sri Lanka
- Nickname: Army Gune
- Height: 6 ft 1 in (1.85 m)
- Batting: Right-handed
- Bowling: Right-arm medium
- Role: All-rounder

International information
- National side: Sri Lanka (2016–2019)
- Test debut (cap 138): 29 October 2016 v Zimbabwe
- Last Test: 26 July 2017 v India
- ODI debut (cap 176): 14 November 2016 v Zimbabwe
- Last ODI: 5 January 2019 v New Zealand
- ODI shirt no.: 14 (previously 42)
- T20I debut (cap 63): 14 February 2016 v India
- Last T20I: 24 December 2017 v India
- T20I shirt no.: 14 (previously 42)

Domestic team information
- Years: Team
- 2008/09–2023/24: SL Army
- 2013/14: Mohammedan Sporting Club
- 2015/16: Kurunegala Warriors
- 2018/19: Dhanmondi Sports Club
- 2019: Lahore Qalandars
- 2019/20: Chattogram Challengers
- 2020–2021: Kandy Tuskers

Career statistics
| Competition | Test | ODI | T20I |
|---|---|---|---|
| Matches | 6 | 31 | 12 |
| Runs scored | 455 | 575 | 225 |
| Batting average | 56.87 | 27.38 | 25.00 |
| 100s/50s | 1/3 | 1/1 | 0/2 |
| Top score | 116 | 114* | 84* |
| Balls bowled | 156 | 834 | 149 |
| Wickets | 3 | 22 | 5 |
| Bowling average | 38.00 | 32.86 | 40.80 |
| 5 wickets in innings | 0 | 0 | 0 |
| 10 wickets in match | 0 | 0 | 0 |
| Best bowling | 2/28 | 3/10 | 1/11 |
| Catches/stumpings | 6/– | 10/– | 5/– |
Medal record
Men's Cricket
Representing Sri Lanka
Asian Games
| Gold medal – first place | 2014 Incheon | Team |
- Source: ESPNcricinfo, 5 January 2019
- Military career
- Allegiance: Sri Lanka
- Branch: Sri Lanka Army
- Rank: Warrant Officer II
- Unit: Sri Lanka Artillery

Downdegedara Asela Sampath Gunaratne, commonly known as Asela Gunaratne (born 8 January 1986) is a professional Sri Lankan cricketer, who played all forms of the game for Sri Lanka. Gunaratne is an aggressive right-handed batsman who occasionally bowls part-time medium pace. He is currently serving in the Sri Lanka Army as a Warrant officer attached to the 6th Field Regiment, Sri Lanka Artillery. He is a past pupil of Sri Rahula College, Kandy. In November 2017, he won four awards at Sri Lanka Cricket's annual awards ceremony, including two awards for best all-rounder.

== Domestic and T20 franchise career ==
In February 2017, he was bought by the Mumbai Indians team for the 2017 Indian Premier League for 30 lakhs.

In March 2018, he was named in Kandy's squad for the 2017–18 Super Four Provincial Tournament. The following month, he was also named in Kandy's squad for the 2018 Super Provincial One Day Tournament.

In August 2018, he was named in Galle's squad the 2018 SLC T20 League. In October 2018, he was named in the squad for the Comilla Victorians team, following the draft for the 2018–19 Bangladesh Premier League. In March 2019, he was named in Kandy's squad for the 2019 Super Provincial One Day Tournament. In October 2020, he was drafted by the Kandy Tuskers for the inaugural edition of the Lanka Premier League. In August 2021, he was named in the SLC Reds team for the 2021 SLC Invitational T20 League tournament. In November 2021, he was selected to play for the Kandy Warriors following the players' draft for the 2021 Lanka Premier League.

== International career ==
He was selected in the Twenty20 International (T20I) squad for Sri Lanka's tour to India in February 2016. He made his T20I debut on 14 February 2016, scoring four runs. Sri Lanka lost the match by 9 wickets.

He made his Test debut for Sri Lanka against Zimbabwe on 29 October 2016. He scored a fifty in the first innings of the first Test and scored his maiden Test century in the second match of the same tour.

He was selected in Sri Lanka's One Day International (ODI) team for Tri-Series in Zimbabwe, with West Indies being the third team. He made his ODI debut in the first match of the tri-series, against Zimbabwe and took 3 wickets.

In May 2018, he was one of 33 cricketers to be awarded a national contract by Sri Lanka Cricket ahead of the 2018–19 season. In December 2018, he was named in Sri Lanka team for the 2018 ACC Emerging Teams Asia Cup.

=== South Africa 2017 ===
Gunaratne scored his maiden ODI century on 11 February 2017 against South Africa at Centurion. His score stands as the highest ODI score at number six against South Africa. However, Sri Lanka lost the match by 88 runs.

Gunaratne was the first Sri Lankan to score an ODI hundred when batting at number six and also holds the record for the highest ODI score for Sri Lanka when batting at number 6 (114 not out).

=== Australia 2017 ===
On 17 February 2017, against Australia, Gunaratne scored his maiden T20I fifty off 37 balls, helping the team to win the match by 5 wickets.

In the next T20I game he scored an unbeaten 84 runs off 46 balls to guide Sri Lanka to the series victory. He was adjudged man of the match in both games for his match-winning performances. Gunaratne set the record for the highest T20I score batting at number five or lower for Sri Lanka, with 84 not out. Gunaratne scored 37 runs off last 12 deliveries of the match to seal the game for Sri Lanka and they won their third consecutive T20I series win against Australia in Australia. After the third T20I, Gunaratne won the award for the player of the series.

=== Zimbabwe 2017 ===
In one-off Test against Zimbabwe in July 2017, Gunaratne scored a match-winning unbeaten 80 to seal the match in a record chase. He along with Niroshan Dickwella made a 121-run stand partnership for the sixth wicket. Sri Lanka won the match by 4 wickets by successfully chasing a total of 388, which was the highest successful chase by Sri Lanka in Tests and also as the highest successful run-chase in Asia. Gunaratne played the whole five-days with an injury, however his match winning innings gave him his maiden Test man of the match award.

=== India 2017 ===
During the first match against India at Galle, Gunaratne was injured with a fracture in his left thumb. The injury occurred when he dived to take a catch of Shikhar Dhawan, while fielding at second slip. With that, he was taken to the hospital, where doctors advised him to quit playing for six to eight weeks following reconstructive surgery in Colombo. Therefore, Sri Lanka played the match with 10 players and finally lost the match by 304 runs. Finally, Gunaratne was dropped from the whole India tour.
