= 2022 Kandy Falcons season =

Kandy based franchise cricket team in Sri Lanka

Kandy Falcons
2022 season
- Logo of Kandy Falcons for 2022 season
- Coach: Piyal Wijetunge
- Captain: Wanidu Hasaranga
- Tournament performance: Playoffs (3rd)
- Most runs: Andre Fletcher (265)
- Most wickets: Carlos Brathwaite (16)

The Kandy Falcons (abbreviated as KF) is a franchise cricket team which competes in 2022 Lanka Premier League. The team is based in Kandy, Central Province, Sri Lanka. In November 2022, Kandy Falcons changed their name to Kandy Falcons. The team was captained by Wanindu Hasaranga and coached by Piyal Wijetunge.

== Squad ==
- Players with international caps are listed in **bold**.
- Ages given as of 6 December 2022, the date the first match was played in the tournament

NO.	Name	Nationality	Date of birth (age)	Batting style	Bowling style	Notes
Batsman
18	**Pathum Nissanka**	Sri Lanka	18 May 1998 (aged 24)	Right-handed	—	
18	**Najibullah Zadran**	Afghanistan	28 February 1993 (aged 29)	Left-handed	Right-arm off break	Overseas player
10	**Ashen Bandara**	Sri Lanka	23 November 1998 (aged 24)	Right-handed	Right-arm leg break	
67	**Janith Liyanage**	Sri Lanka	12 July 1995 (aged 27)	Right-handed	Right-arm fast-medium	
3	**Ashan Priyanjan**	Sri Lanka	14 August 1989 (aged 33)	Right-handed	Right-arm off break	
	Kavin Bandara	Sri Lanka	20 August 1997 (aged 25)	Right-handed	Right-arm off break	
All-rounders
49	**Wanindu Hasaranga**	Sri Lanka	29 July 1997 (aged 25)	Right-handed	Right-arm leg break	Captain
17	**Isuru Udana**	Sri Lanka	17 February 1988 (aged 34)	Right-handed	Left-arm medium	
29	**Chamika Karunaratne**	Sri Lanka	29 May 1996 (aged 26)	Right-handed	Right-arm medium-fast	
21	**Kamindu Mendis**	Sri Lanka	30 September 1998 (aged 24)	Left-handed	Ambidextrous off break	
26	**Carlos Brathwaite**	West Indies	18 July 1988 (aged 34)	Right-handed	Right-arm fast-medium	Overseas player
97	**Fabian Allen**	West Indies	7 May 1995 (aged 27)	Right-handed	Slow left arm orthodox	Overseas player
Wicket-keepers
15	**Minod Bhanuka**	Sri Lanka	29 April 1995 (aged 27)	Left-handed	—	
72	**Andre Fletcher**	West Indies	28 November 1987 (aged 35)	Right-handed	Right-arm medium-fast	Overseas player
	Lasith Abeyratne	Sri Lanka	23 May 1993 (aged 29)	Right-handed	—	
	Avishka Perera	Sri Lanka	26 April 2001 (aged 21)	Right-handed	—	
Spin bowlers
	**Malinda Pushpakumara**	Sri Lanka	24 March 1987 (aged 35)	Right-handed	Slow left arm orthodox	
	Ashian Daniel	Sri Lanka	20 February 2001 (aged 21)	Right-handed	Right-arm off break	
Pace bowlers
	Ahmed Daniyal	Pakistan	3 July 1997 (aged 25)	Right-handed	Right-arm medium-fast	Overseas player
72	**Oshane Thomas**	West Indies	18 February 1997 (aged 25)	Left-handed	Right-arm fast	Overseas player
99	Matheesha Pathirana	Sri Lanka	18 December 2002 (aged 19)	Right-handed	Right-arm medium-fast	

== Administration and support staff ==
Position	Name
Director of Cricket	Shyam Impett
Head coach	Piyal Wijetunge
Assistant coach	Tharanga Dhammika
Consultant coach	Sanath Jayasuriya
Fielding coach	Manoj Abeywickrama

== Season standings ==
Pos	Team	Pld	W	L	NR	Pts	NRR
1	Kandy Falcons (3rd)	8	7	1	0	14	1.884
2	Jaffna Kings (C)	8	6	2	0	12	1.010
3	Colombo Stars (R)	8	3	5	0	6	−0.847
4	Galle Gladiators (4th)	8	2	6	0	4	−0.936
5	Dambulla Aura	8	2	6	0	4	−1.198

Source: ESPN Cricinfo
- The top four teams qualify for the playoffs
- Advance to Qualifier 1
- Advance to Eliminator

== League stage ==
Match 2
6 December 2022
19:30 (N)
Scorecard

Kandy Falcons; 199/1 (20 overs)	v	Colombo Stars; 90 (14.3 overs)
Andre Fletcher 102* (67); Seekkuge Prasanna 1/23 (3 overs)		Angelo Mathews 26 (23); Wanindu Hasaranga 4/14 (3 overs)

Kandy Falcons won by 109 runs.
Mahinda Rajapaksa International Cricket Stadium, Hambantota
Umpires: Chandrika Amarasinghe (SL) and Raveendra Wimalasiri (SL)
Player of the match: Andre Fletcher (Kandy Falcons)

- Colombo Stars won the toss and elected to field.

Match 4
7 December 2022
19:30 (D/N)
Scorecard

Galle Gladiators; 121/8 (20 overs)	v	Kandy Falcons; 123/5 (15 overs)
Movin Subasingha 40 (38); Carlos Brathwaite 4/14 (4 overs)		Kamindu Mendis 44 (34); Nuwan Pradeep 2/34 (3 overs)

Kandy Falcons won by 5 wickets
Mahinda Rajapaksa International Cricket Stadium, Hambantota
Umpires: Chamara de Soysa (SL) and Prageeth Rambukwella (SL)
Player of the match: Carlos Brathwaite (Kandy Falcons)

- Galle Gladiators won the toss and elected to bat.

Match 6
10 December 2022
19:30 (D/N)
Scorecard

Jaffna Kings; 147/7 (20 overs)	v	Kandy Falcons; 148/7 (20 overs)
Avishka Fernando 31 (26); Fabian Allen 2/23 (4 overs)		Ashen Bandara 44* (39); Dunith Wellalage 2/17 (4 overs)

Kandy Falcons won by 3 wickets
Pallekele International Cricket Stadium, Kandy
Umpires: Gregory Brathwaite (WI) and Raveendra Wimalasiri (SL)
Player of the match: Chamika Karunaratne (Kandy Falcons)

- Kandy Falcons won the toss and elected to field.

Match 9
12 December 2022
15:00 (D/N)
Scorecard

Galle Gladiators; 153/6 (20 overs)	v	Kandy Falcons; 141/7 (20 overs)
Thanuka Dabare 70 (51); Carlos Brathwaite 3/17 (4 overs)		Ashen Bandara 41* (30); Lakshan Sandakan 2/22 (4 overs)

Galle Gladiators won by 12 runs
Pallekele International Cricket Stadium, Kandy
Umpires: Ravindra Kottahachchi (SL) and Prageeth Rambukwella (SL)
Player of the match: Thanuka Dabare (Galle Gladiators)

- Galle Gladiators won the toss and elected to bat.

Match 11
13 December 2022
15:00 (D/N)
Scorecard

Kandy Falcons; 193/3 (20 overs)	v	Dambulla Aura; 116 (14.2 overs)
Kamindu Mendis 58 (40); Chaturanga de Silva 1/26 (3 overs)		Chaturanga de Silva 25 (15); Carlos Brathwaite 3/25 (3 overs); Chamindu Wijesinghe 3/25 (3 overs)

Kandy Falcons won by 77 runs
Pallekele International Cricket Stadium, Kandy
Umpires: Gregory Brathwaite (WI) and Ravindra Kottahachchi (SL)
Player of the match: Kamindu Mendis (Kandy Falcons)

- Kandy Falcons won the toss and elected to bat.

Match 13
14 December 2022
15:00 (N)
Scorecard

Kandy Falcons; 160/8 (20 overs)	v	Jaffna Kings; 150/9 (20 overs)
Fabian Allen 47 (23); Dunith Wellalage 2/7 (4 overs)		Sadeera Samarawickrama 48 (41); Carlos Brathwaite 4/18 (4 overs)

Kandy Falcons won by 10 runs
Pallekele International Cricket Stadium, Kandy
Umpires: Gregory Brathwaite (WI) and Chamara de Soysa (SL)
Player of the match: Fabian Allen (Kandy Falcons)

- Kandy Falcons won the toss and elected to bat.

Match 16
17 December 2022
19:30 (D/N)
Scorecard

Colombo Stars; 106 (19.1 overs)	v	Kandy Falcons; 108/1 (16 overs)
Angelo Mathews 41 (38); Chamika Karunaratne 4/11 (3.1 overs)		Kamindu Mendis 51* (48); Suranga Lakmal 1/19 (2 overs)

Kandy Falcons won by 9 wickets
R. Premadasa Stadium, Colombo
Umpires: Wayne Knights (NZ) and Raveendra Wimalasiri (SL)
Player of the match: Chamika Karunaratne (Kandy Falcons)

- Colombo Stars won the toss and elected to bat.

Match 18
18 December 2022
19:30 (D/N)
Scorecard

Kandy Falcons; 160/7 (20 overs)	v	Dambulla Aura; 121/9 (20 overs)
Ashen Bandara 37 (31); Matthew Forde 2/16 (3 overs)		Sikandar Raza 45 (33); Oshane Thomas 3/15 (4 overs)

Kandy Falcons won by 39 runs
R. Premadasa Stadium, Colombo
Umpires: Chamara de Soysa (SL) and Wayne Knights (NZ)
Player of the match: Oshane Thomas (Kandy Falcons)

- Kandy Falcons won the toss and elected to bat.

== Playoffs ==
=== Qualifier 1 ===
Match 21
21 December 2022
15:30 (D/N)
Scorecard

Kandy Falcons; 143/8 (20 overs)	v	Jaffna Kings; 98/3 (11 overs)
Pathum Nissanka 35 (31); Vijayakanth Viyaskanth 3/30 (4 overs)		Avishka Fernando 21 (11); Carlos Brathwaite 2/32 (3 overs)

Jaffna Kings won by 24 runs (DLS method)
R. Premadasa Stadium, Colombo
Umpires: Kumar Dharmasena (SL) and Ruchira Palliyaguruge (SL)
Player of the match: Vijayakanth Viyaskanth (Jaffna Kings)

- Kandy Falcons won the toss and elected to bat.
- Jaffna Kings were set a revised target of 75 runs from 11 overs due to rain.
- Rain during Jaffna Kings's innings prevented any further play.

=== Qualifier 2 ===
Match 23
22 December 2022
19:30 (N)
Scorecard

Kandy Falcons; 168/6 (20 overs)	v	Colombo Stars; 169/4 (18.5 overs)
Wanindu Hasaranga 77* (34); Kasun Rajitha 4/20 (4 overs)		Charith Asalanka 64 (40); Kamindu Mendis 2/26 (4 overs)

Colombo Stars won by 6 wickets
R. Premadasa Stadium, Colombo
Umpires: Wayne Knights (NZ) and Raveendra Wimalasiri (SL)
Player of the match: Kasun Rajitha (Colombo Stars)

- Colombo Stars won the toss and elected to field.

== Statistics ==
=== Most runs ===
Player	Matches	Runs	High score
Andre Fletcher	9	266	102*
Kamindu Mendis	10	260	58
Ashen Bandara	10	244	44

- Source: ESPNcricinfo
