= 2023 B-Love Kandy season =

Kandy based franchise cricket team in Sri Lanka

B-Love Kandy
2023 season
- Official logo of B-Love Kandy
- Coach: Mushtaq Ahmed
- Captain: Wanindu Hasaranga
- Tournament performance: Champions (1st title)
- Most runs: Wanindu Hasaranga (279)
- Most wickets: Wanindu Hasaranga (19)

The B-Love Kandy (abbreviated as BLK) is a franchise cricket team that competed in 2023 Lanka Premier League. The team is based in Kandy, Central Province Sri Lanka. They changed their name to B-Love Kandy under new ownership, B-Love Network. The team was captained by Wanindu Hasaranga and coached by Mushtaq Ahmed.

On 20 August 2023, B-Love Kandy defeated Dambulla Aura by 5 wickets in the final, to win their maiden LPL title.

== Standings ==
Pos	Team	Pld	W	L	NR	Pts	NRR
1	Dambulla Aura (R)	8	6	2	0	12	0.793
2	Galle Titans (3rd)	8	4	4	0	8	0.353
3	B-Love Kandy (C)	8	4	4	0	8	0.185
4	Jaffna Kings (4th)	8	3	5	0	6	−0.179
5	Colombo Strikers	8	3	5	0	6	−1.215

Source: ESPN Cricinfo
- The top four teams qualified for the playoffs
- Advance to Qualifier 1
- Advance to Eliminator

== League fixtures ==
Match 3
31 July 2023
19:30 (N)
Scorecard

Colombo Strikers; 157/6 (20 overs)	v	B-Love Kandy; 130/8 (20 overs)
Babar Azam 59 (52); Isuru Udana 3/39 (4 overs)		Angelo Mathews 25 (22); Matheesha Pathirana 3/24 (4 overs)

Colombo Strikers won by 27 runs
R. Premadasa Stadium, Colombo
Umpires: Chandrika Amarasinghe (SL) and Gazi Sohel (Ban)
Player of the match: Babar Azam (Colombo Strikers)

- Colombo Strikers won the toss and elected to bat.

Match 5
1 August 2023
19:30 (D/N)
Scorecard

Galle Titans; 180/5 (20 overs)	v	B-Love Kandy; 97 (17.1 overs)
Tim Seifert 74 (39); Mohammad Hasnain 1/26 (4 overs)		Ashen Bandara 27 (19); Kasun Rajitha 2/8 (2 overs)

Galle Titans won by 83 runs
R. Premadasa Stadium, Colombo
Umpires: Chamara de Soysa (SL) and Gazi Sohel (Ban)
Player of the match: Tim Seifert (Galle Titans)

- Galle Titans won the toss and elected to bat.

Match 6
4 August 2023
15:00 (D/N)
Scorecard

Dambulla Aura; 156/6 (20 overs)	v	B-Love Kandy; 160/3 (18.3 overs)
Dhananjaya de Silva 61 (39); Mujeeb Ur Rahman 2/17 (4 overs)		Dinesh Chandimal 48 (29); Dhananjaya de Silva 1/16 (3 overs)

B-Love Kandy won by 7 wickets
Pallekele International Cricket Stadium, Pallekele
Umpires: Prageeth Rambukwella (SL) and Gazi Sohel (Ban)
Player of the match: Mujeeb Ur Rahman (B-Love Kandy)

- Dambulla Aura won the toss and elected to bat.

Match 9
5 August 2023
19:30
Scorecard

B-Love Kandy; 117/9 (20 overs)	v	Jaffna Kings; 118/2 (13 overs)
Dunith Wellalage 38* (27); Wanindu Hasaranga 3/9 (4 overs)		Wanindu Hasaranga 52* (22); Nandre Burger 1/17 (2 overs)

B-Love Kandy won by 8 wickets
Pallekele International Cricket Stadium, Pallekele
Umpires: Kumar Dharmasena (SL) and Ruchira Palliyaguruge (SL)
Player of the match: Wanindu Hasaranga (B-Love Kandy)

- B-Love Kandy won the toss and elected to field.

Match 12
8 August 2023
15:00
Scorecard

B-Love Kandy; 203/5 (20 overs)	v	Galle Titans; 114 (16.4 overs)
Wanindu Hasaranga 64 (27); Lahiru Samarakoon 2/31 (4 overs)		Lahiru Samarakoon 36 (25); Wanindu Hasaranga 4/17 (3.4 overs)

B-Love Kandy won by 89 runs
Pallekele International Cricket Stadium, Pallekele
Umpires: Kumar Dharmasena (SL) and Ravindra Kottahachchi (SL)
Player of the match: Wanindu Hasaranga (B-Love Kandy)

- Galle Titans won the toss and elected to field.

Match 15
12 August 2023
15:00
Scorecard

B-Love Kandy; 178/8 (20 overs)	v	Jaffna Kings; 170/6 (20 overs)
Mohammad Haris 81 (51); Nuwan Thushara 3/31 (4 overs)		Shoaib Malik 55* (37); Angelo Mathews 3/10 (3 overs)

B-Love Kandy won by 8 runs
R. Premadasa Stadium, Colombo
Umpires: Chamara de Soysa (SL) and Ruchira Palliyaguruge (SL)
Player of the match: Mohammad Haris (B-Love Kandy)

- B-Love Kandy won the toss and elected to field.

Match 18
13 August 2023
19:30
Scorecard

Colombo Strikers; 169/9 (20 overs)	v	B-Love Kandy; 160/8 (20 overs)
Pathum Nissanka 51 (38); Wanindu Hasaranga 2/21 (4 overs)		Wanindu Hasaranga 40 (21); Matheesha Pathirana 2/32 (4 overs)

Colombo Strikers won by 9 runs
R. Premadasa Stadium, Colombo
Umpires: Ranmore Martinesz (SL) and Ruchira Palliyaguruge (SL)
Player of the match: Pathum Nissanka (Colombo Strikers)

- Colombo Strikers won the toss and elected to bat.

Match 19
14 August 2023
19:30
Scorecard

Dambulla Aura; 162/7 (20 overs)	v	B-Love Kandy; 142 (19.4 overs)
Avishka Fernando 41 (27); Nuwan Pradeep 3/35 (4 overs)		Dinesh Chandimal 50 (46); Dhananjaya de Silva 4/6 (2 overs)

Dambulla Aura won by 20 runs
R. Premadasa Stadium, Colombo
Umpires: Aleem Dar (Pak) and Ruchira Palliyaguruge (SL)
Player of the match: Dhananjaya de Silva (Dambulla Aura)

- B-Love Kandy won the toss and elected to field.

== Playoffs ==
Eliminator
17 August 2023
19:30 (N)
Scorecard

B-Love Kandy; 188/8 (20 overs)	v	Jaffna Kings; 127 (17.2 overs)
Mohammad Haris 79 (49); Nuwan Thushara 4/40 (4 overs)		Shoaib Malik 31 (23); Wanindu Hasaranga 6/9 (3.2 overs)

B-Love Kandy won by 61 runs
R. Premadasa Stadium, Colombo
Umpires: Aleem Dar (Pak) and Prageeth Rambukwella (SL)
Player of the match: Wanindu Hasaranga (B-Love Kandy)

- Jaffna Kings won the toss and elected to field.

Qualifier 2
19 August 2023
19:30 (N)
Scorecard

B-Love Kandy; 157/7 (20 overs)	v	Galle Titans; 123/8 (20 overs)
Wanindu Hasaranga 48 (30); Lahiru Kumara 2/21 (4 overs)		Sonal Dinusha 28 (32); Mohammad Hasnain 2/8 (3 overs)

B-Love Kandy won by 34 runs
R. Premadasa Stadium, Colombo
Umpires: Aleem Dar (Pak) and Raveendra Wimalasiri (SL)
Player of the match: Wanindu Hasaranga (B-Love Kandy)

- B-Love Kandy won the toss and elected to bat.

Final
20 August 2023
19:30 (N)
Scorecard

Dambulla Aura; 147/4 (20 overs)	v	B-Love Kandy; 151/5 (19.5 overs)
Dhananjaya de Silva 40 (29); Chaturanga de Silva 2/25 (4 overs)		Kamindu Mendis 44 (37); Noor Ahmad 3/27 (4 overs)

B-Love Kandy won by 5 wickets
R. Premadasa Stadium, Colombo
Umpires: Aleem Dar (Pak) and Kumar Dharmasena (SL)
Player of the match: Angelo Mathews (B-Love Kandy)

- Dambulla Aura won the toss and elected to bat.
