= 2023 Lanka Premier League final =

Final match of the LPL 2023

2023 Lanka Premier League Final
- Match programme cover
- Event: 2023 Lanka Premier League
| Dambulla Aura | B-Love Kandy |
| 147/4 | 151/5 |
| (20 overs) | (19.5 overs) |
- B-Love Kandy won by 5 wickets
- Date: 20 August 2023
- Venue: R. Premadasa Stadium, Colombo
- Player of the match: Angelo Mathews (B-Love Kandy)
- Umpires: Aleem Dar (Pakistan); Kumar Dharmasena (Sri Lanka)

The 2023 Lanka Premier League Final was played on 20 August 2023 at the R. Premadasa Stadium in Colombo, Sri Lanka. Dambulla Aura qualified for the finals after their win in Qualifier 1. They competed with B-Love Kandy, who qualified for the finals after their win in Qualifier 2.

After winning the toss, Dambulla Aura elected to bat and only managed to score 147/4 runs in 20 overs. The B-Love Kandy chased the target in 19.5 overs and won the match by five wickets, thus winning their first LPL title. B-Love Kandy player Angelo Mathews was named as the player of the match. Wanindu Hasaranga (B-Love Kandy) was named as the player of the season for scoring 279 runs and taking 19 wickets throughout the tournament.

== Match ==
=== Match officials ===
- On-field umpires: Aleem Dar (Pak) and Kumar Dharmasena (SL)
- Third umpire: Ruchira Palliyaguruge (SL)
- Reserve umpire: Raveendra Wimalasiri (SL)
- Match referee: Ranjan Madugalle (SL)

=== Summary ===
20 August 2023
19:30 (N)
Scorecard

| Dambulla Aura; 147/4 (20 overs) | v | B-Love Kandy; 151/5 (19.5 overs) |
| Dhananjaya de Silva 40 (29); Chaturanga de Silva 2/25 (4 overs) | | Kamindu Mendis 44 (37); Noor Ahmad 3/27 (4 overs) |

B-Love Kandy won by 5 wickets
R. Premadasa Stadium, Colombo
Umpires: Aleem Dar (Pak) and Kumar Dharmasena (SL)
Player of the match: Angelo Mathews (B-Love Kandy)

- Dambulla Aura won the toss and elected to bat.

=== Match scorecard ===
==== 1st innings ====
Dambulla Aura batting
| Player | Status | Runs | Balls | 4s | 6s | Strike rate |
|---|---|---|---|---|---|---|
| Avishka Fernando | c Haris b Pradeep | 5 | 10 | 0 | 0 | 50.00 |
| Kusal Mendis (c, wk) | c †D. Chandimal b Chathuranga | 22 | 23 | 3 | 0 | 95.65 |
| Sadeera Samarawickrama | b Chathuranga | 36 | 30 | 5 | 0 | 120.00 |
| Kusal Perera | not out | 31 | 25 | 2 | 1 | 124.00 |
| Dhananjaya de Silva | c Mathews b Hasnain | 40 | 29 | 0 | 3 | 137.93 |
| Alex Ross | not out | 2 | 3 | 0 | 0 | 66.66 |
| Hayden Kerr | did not bat | | | | | |
| Dushan Hemantha | did not bat | | | | | |
| Binura Fernando | did not bat | | | | | |
| Noor Ahmad | did not bat | | | | | |
| Pramod Madushan | did not bat | | | | | |
| Extras | (w 8, lb 3) | 11 | | | | |
| Total | (4 wickets; 20 overs) | 147 | | 10 | 4 | RR: 7.35 |

Fall of wickets: 1/11 (Avishka, 2.2 ov), 2/68 (Sadeera, 10.1 ov), 3/71 (K. Mendis, 10.5 ov), 4/134 (Dhananjaya, 18.3 ov)

B-Love Kandy bowling
| Bowler | Overs | Maidens | Runs | Wickets | Econ | Wides | NBs |
|---|---|---|---|---|---|---|---|
| Angelo Mathews | 2 | 0 | 11 | 0 | 5.50 | 0 | 0 |
| Mujeeb Ur Rahman | 4 | 0 | 24 | 0 | 6.00 | 1 | 0 |
| Nuwan Pradeep | 4 | 0 | 30 | 1 | 7.50 | 0 | 0 |
| Chaturanga de Silva | 4 | 0 | 25 | 2 | 6.25 | 1 | 0 |
| Mohammad Hasnain | 4 | 0 | 38 | 1 | 9.50 | 1 | 0 |
| Kamindu Mendis | 2 | 0 | 16 | 0 | 8.00 | 1 | 0 |

==== 2nd innings ====
B-Love Kandy batting
| Player | Status | Runs | Balls | 4s | 6s | Strike rate |
|---|---|---|---|---|---|---|
| Mohammad Haris | b Noor | 26 | 22 | 3 | 1 | 118.18 |
| Kamindu Mendis | c Sadeera b Noor | 44 | 37 | 3 | 1 | 118.91 |
| Dinesh Chandimal (wk) | c Pramod b Binura | 24 | 22 | 3 | 0 | 109.09 |
| Angelo Mathews (c) | not out | 25 | 21 | 3 | 0 | 119.04 |
| Chaturanga de Silva | c Kerr b Noor | 0 | 4 | 0 | 0 | 0.00 |
| Asif Ali | c Kusal b Binura | 19 | 10 | 2 | 1 | 190.00 |
| Lahiru Madushanka | not out | 5 | 3 | 1 | 0 | 166.66 |
| Ashen Bandara | did not bat | | | | | |
| Mohammad Hasnain | did not bat | | | | | |
| Mujeeb Ur Rahman | did not bat | | | | | |
| Nuwan Pradeep | did not bat | | | | | |
| Extras | (w 2, lb 6) | 8 | | | | |
| Total | (5 wickets; 19.5 overs) | 151 | | 15 | 3 | RR: 7.61 |

Fall of wickets: 1/49 (Haris, 6.3 ov), 2/94 (Kamindu, 12.4 ov), 3/105 (D. Chandimal, 14.6 ov), 4/107 (Chathuranga, 15.5 ov), 5/132 (Asif, 18.1 ov)

Dambulla Aura bowling
| Bowler | Overs | Maidens | Runs | Wickets | Econ | Wides | NBs |
|---|---|---|---|---|---|---|---|
| Binura Fernando | 4 | 0 | 31 | 2 | 7.75 | 0 | 0 |
| Dhananjaya de Silva | 3 | 0 | 16 | 0 | 5.33 | 0 | 0 |
| Pramod Madushan | 2.5 | 0 | 20 | 0 | 7.05 | 0 | 0 |
| Hayden Kerr | 3 | 0 | 30 | 0 | 10.00 | 0 | 0 |
| Noor Ahmad | 4 | 0 | 27 | 3 | 6.75 | 2 | 0 |
| Dushan Hemantha | 3 | 0 | 21 | 0 | 7.00 | 0 | 0 |
