= 2022 Jaffna Kings season =

Overview of Jaffna Kings in 2022

Jaffna Kings
2022 season
- Coach: Thilina Kandamby
- Captain: Thisara Perera
- Tournament performance: Champions
- Most runs: Avishka Fernando (339)
- Most wickets: Vijayakanth Viyaskanth (13)

The Jaffna Kings (often abbreviated as JK) is a franchise cricket team that competed in 2022 Lanka Premier League (LPL). The team is based in Jaffna, Northern Province, Sri Lanka. The team was captained by Thisara Perera and coached by Thilina Kandamby. In the final, they beat Colombo Strikers by 2 wickets, to win their third successive LPL title.

== Season standings ==
=== Points table ===
Pos	Team	Pld	W	L	NR	Pts	NRR
1	Kandy Falcons (3rd)	8	7	1	0	14	1.884
2	Jaffna Kings (C)	8	6	2	0	12	1.010
3	Colombo Stars (R)	8	3	5	0	6	−0.847
4	Galle Gladiators (4th)	8	2	6	0	4	−0.936
5	Dambulla Aura	8	2	6	0	4	−1.198

Source: ESPN Cricinfo
- The top four teams qualified for the playoffs
- Advance to Qualifier 1
- Advance to Eliminator

== League stage ==
The updated schedule was published on 14 October 2022.

Match 1
6 December 2022
15:00 (D/N)
Scorecard

Jaffna Kings; 137 (19.5 overs)	v	Galle Gladiators; 113 (20 overs)
Dunith Wellalage 30 (20); Iftikhar Ahmed 2/8 (1 over)		Kusal Mendis 51 (43); Binura Fernando 3/22 (3 overs)

Jaffna Kings won by 24 runs
Mahinda Rajapaksa International Cricket Stadium, Hambantota
Umpires: Ravindra Kottahachchi (SL) and Ruchira Palliyaguruge (SL)
Player of the match: Dunith Wellalage (Jaffna Kings)

- Galle Gladiators won the toss and elected to field.

Match 3
7 December 2022
15:00 (D/N)
Scorecard

Dambulla Aura; 121/9 (20 overs)	v	Jaffna Kings; 122/1 (15.4 overs)
Jordan Cox 43 (22); Mahesh Theekshana 3/20 (4 overs)		Sadeera Samarawickrama 62* (44); Noor Ahmad 1/28 (3.4 overs)

Jaffna Kings won by 9 wickets
Mahinda Rajapaksa International Cricket Stadium, Hambantota
Umpires: Lyndon Hannibal (SL) and Ranmore Martinesz (SL)
Player of the match: Sadeera Samarawickrama (Jaffna Kings)

- Dambulla Aura won the toss and elected to bat.

Match 6
10 December 2022
19:30 (D/N)
Scorecard

Jaffna Kings; 147/7 (20 overs)	v	Kandy Falcons; 148/7 (20 overs)
Avishka Fernando 31 (26); Fabian Allen 2/23 (4 overs)		Ashen Bandara 44* (39); Dunith Wellalage 2/17 (4 overs)

Kandy Falcons won by 3 wickets
Pallekele International Cricket Stadium, Kandy
Umpires: Gregory Brathwaite (WI) and Raveendra Wimalasiri (SL)
Player of the match: Chamika Karunaratne (Kandy Falcons)

- Kandy Falcons won the toss and elected to field.

Match 8
11 December 2022
19:30 (N)
Scorecard

Jaffna Kings; 240/4 (20 overs)	v	Dambulla Aura; 189/8 (20 overs)
Rahmanullah Gurbaz 73 (35); Lahiru Kumara 2/56 (4 overs)		Dasun Shanaka 44 (23); Binura Fernando 4/22 (4 overs)

Jaffna Kings won by 51 runs
Pallekele International Cricket Stadium, Kandy
Umpires: Gregory Brathwaite (WI) and Prageeth Rambukwella (SL)
Player of the match: Rahmanullah Gurbaz (Jaffna Kings)

- Dambulla Aura won the toss and elected to field.

Match 10
12 December 2022
19:30 (N)
Scorecard

Jaffna Kings; 178/5 (20 overs)	v	Colombo Stars; 172/8 (20 overs)
Shoaib Malik 35* (26); Benny Howell 2/37 (4 overs)		Angelo Mathews 73* (39); James Fuller 2/32 (4 overs); Vijayakanth Viyaskanth 2/32 (4 overs)

Jaffna Kings won by 6 runs
Pallekele International Cricket Stadium, Kandy
Umpires: Gregory Brathwaite (WI) and Ranmore Martinesz (SL)
Player of the match: James Fuller (Jaffna Kings)

- Colombo Stars won the toss and elected to field.

Match 13
14 December 2022
15:00 (N)
Scorecard

Kandy Falcons; 160/8 (20 overs)	v	Jaffna Kings; 150/9 (20 overs)
Fabian Allen 47 (23); Dunith Wellalage 2/7 (4 overs)		Sadeera Samarawickrama 48 (41); Carlos Brathwaite 4/18 (4 overs)

Kandy Falcons won by 10 runs
Pallekele International Cricket Stadium, Kandy
Umpires: Gregory Brathwaite (WI) and Chamara de Soysa (SL)
Player of the match: Fabian Allen (Kandy Falcons)

- Kandy Falcons won the toss and elected to bat.

Match 17
18 December 2022
15:00 (N)
Scorecard

Jaffna Kings; 170/8 (20 overs)	v	Galle Gladiators; 154/9 (20 overs)
Afif Hossain 54 (35); Wahab Riaz 3/37 (4 overs)		Kusal Mendis 58 (45); Binura Fernando 3/20 (4 overs)

Jaffna Kings won by 16 runs
R. Premadasa Stadium, Colombo
Umpires: Kumar Dharmasena (SL) and Ravindra Kottahachchi (SL)
Player of the match: Afif Hossain (Jaffna Kings)

- Jaffna Kings won the toss and elected to bat.

Match 19
19 December 2022
15:00 (N)
Scorecard

Colombo Stars; 128/9 (20 overs)	v	Jaffna Kings; 131/2 (15.5 overs)
Dominic Drakes 38 (20); Shoaib Malik 2/4 (2 overs)		Rahmanullah Gurbaz 69 (40); Dominic Drakes 1/30 (2.5 overs)

Jaffna Kings won by 8 wickets
R. Premadasa Stadium, Colombo
Umpires: Lyndon Hannibal (SL) and Wayne Knights (NZ)
Player of the match: Rahmanullah Gurbaz (Jaffna Kings)

- Jaffna Kings won the toss and elected to field.

== Playoffs ==
=== Qualifier 1 ===
Match 21
21 December 2022
15:30 (D/N)
Scorecard

Kandy Falcons; 143/8 (20 overs)	v	Jaffna Kings; 98/3 (11 overs)
Pathum Nissanka 35 (31); Vijayakanth Viyaskanth 3/30 (4 overs)		Avishka Fernando 21 (11); Carlos Brathwaite 2/32 (3 overs)

Jaffna Kings won by 24 runs (DLS method)
R. Premadasa Stadium, Colombo
Umpires: Kumar Dharmasena (SL) and Ruchira Palliyaguruge (SL)
Player of the match: Vijayakanth Viyaskanth (Jaffna Kings)

- Kandy Falcons won the toss and elected to bat.
- Jaffna Kings were set a revised target of 75 runs from 11 overs due to rain.
- Rain during Jaffna Kings's innings prevented any further play.

=== Final ===
Match 24
23 December 2022
19:30 (N)
Scorecard

Colombo Stars; 163/5 (20 overs)	v	Jaffna Kings; 164/8 (19.2 overs)
Dinesh Chandimal 49 (40); Thisara Perera 1/16 (2 overs)		Avishka Fernando 50 (43); Suranga Lakmal 3/23 (3 overs)

Jaffna Kings won by 2 wickets
R. Premadasa Stadium, Colombo
Umpires: Kumar Dharmasena (SL) and Wayne Knights (NZ)
Player of the match: Avishka Fernando (Jaffna Kings)

- Jaffna Kings won the toss and elected to field.
