= West Indian cricket team in Sri Lanka in 2019–20 =

International cricket tour

	Sri Lanka	West Indies
- Dates: 17 February – 6 March 2020
Captains	Dimuth Karunaratne (ODIs); Lasith Malinga (T20Is)	Kieron Pollard

One Day International series
- Results: Sri Lanka won the 3-match series 3–0
Most runs	Avishka Fernando (206)	Shai Hope (238)
Most wickets	Angelo Mathews (5)	Alzarri Joseph (10)
- Player of the series: Wanindu Hasaranga (SL)

Twenty20 International series
- Results: West Indies won the 2-match series 2–0
Most runs	Kusal Perera (81)	Brandon King (76); Lendl Simmons (76)
Most wickets	Seven bowlers took one wicket each (Note: Dasun Shanaka, Wanindu Hasaranga, Lahiru Kumara, Isuru Udana, Angelo Mathews, Lakshan Sandakan and Lasith Malinga all took one wicket each.)	Oshane Thomas (6)
- Player of the series: Andre Russell (WI)

The West Indies cricket team toured Sri Lanka in February and March 2020 to play three One Day International (ODI) and two Twenty20 International (T20I) matches. The full schedule for the tour was confirmed by Sri Lanka Cricket on 21 January 2020. The West Indies last toured Sri Lanka in October and November 2015.

On 19 February 2020, Sri Lanka named their ODI squad, with Dimuth Karunaratne returning as captain of the side. Lahiru Thirimanne had led the team in their previous ODI series, against Pakistan, but was dropped due to poor form. Sri Lanka won the first two ODIs, to give them an unassailable lead in the series. Sri Lanka won the final ODI by six runs, winning the series 3–0.

In the first T20I match, Kieron Pollard became the first cricketer to play in 500 Twenty20 matches. The West Indies won the T20I series 2–0.

== Squads ==
ODIs		T20Is	
Sri Lanka	West Indies	Sri Lanka	West Indies
Dimuth Karunaratne (c); Niroshan Dickwella (wk); Avishka Fernando; Wanindu Hasaranga; Shehan Jayasuriya; Lahiru Kumara; Angelo Mathews; Kusal Mendis; Kusal Perera (wk); Thisara Perera; Nuwan Pradeep; Lakshan Sandakan; Dasun Shanaka; Dhananjaya de Silva; Isuru Udana	Kieron Pollard (c); Fabian Allen; Sunil Ambris; Darren Bravo; Roston Chase; Sheldon Cottrell; Jason Holder; Shai Hope (wk); Alzarri Joseph; Brandon King; Keemo Paul; Nicholas Pooran; Rovman Powell; Romario Shepherd; Hayden Walsh Jr.	Lasith Malinga (c); Niroshan Dickwella (wk); Asitha Fernando; Avishka Fernando; Wanindu Hasaranga; Shehan Jayasuriya; Lahiru Kumara; Angelo Mathews; Kusal Mendis; Kusal Perera (wk); Thisara Perera; ~~Nuwan Pradeep~~; Lakshan Sandakan; Dasun Shanaka; ~~Dhananjaya de Silva~~; Isuru Udana	Kieron Pollard (c); Fabian Allen; Dwayne Bravo; Sheldon Cottrell; Shimron Hetmyer; Shai Hope (wk); Brandon King; Nicholas Pooran; Rovman Powell; Andre Russell; Lendl Simmons; Oshane Thomas; Hayden Walsh Jr.; Kesrick Williams

During the ODI series, Nuwan Pradeep and Dhananjaya de Silva both suffered injuries and were ruled out of Sri Lanka's T20I squad. Asitha Fernando replaced Pradeep, but no replacement was named for de Silva.

== Tour matches ==
=== One-day match: Sri Lanka Board President's XI vs West Indies ===
17 February 2020
10:00
Scorecard

West Indies; 282 (49.4 overs)	v	Sri Lanka Board President's XI; 283/8 (47.3 overs)
Darren Bravo 100 (88); Dilshan Madushanka 3/47 (7 overs)		Upul Tharanga 120 (124); Sheldon Cottrell 2/22 (4 overs)

Sri Lanka Board President's XI won by 2 wickets
P. Sara Oval, Colombo
Umpires: Hemantha Boteju (SL) and Rohitha Kottahachchi (SL)

- West Indies won the toss and elected to bat.

=== One-day match: Sri Lanka Board President's XI vs West Indies ===
20 February 2020
10:00
Scorecard

Sri Lanka Board President's XI; 276/8 (50 overs)	v	West Indies; 277/4 (46.3 overs)
Minod Bhanuka 69 (88); Keemo Paul 2/45 (9 overs)		Roston Chase 136 (113); Vishwa Fernando 2/56 (8.3 overs)

West Indies won by 6 wickets
FTZ Sports Complex, Katunayake
Umpires: Deepal Gunawardene (SL) and Ravindra Kottahachchi (SL)

- Sri Lanka Board President's XI won the toss and elected to bat.

== ODI series ==
=== 1st ODI ===
22 February 2020
09:45
Scorecard

West Indies; 289/7 (50 overs)	v	Sri Lanka; 290/9 (49.1 overs)
Shai Hope 115 (140); Isuru Udana 3/82 (10 overs)		Dimuth Karunaratne 52 (57); Alzarri Joseph 3/42 (10 overs)

Sri Lanka won by 1 wicket
Sinhalese Sports Club Cricket Ground, Colombo
Umpires: Ruchira Palliyaguruge (SL) and Paul Wilson (Aus)
Player of the match: Wanindu Hasaranga (SL)

- Sri Lanka won the toss and elected to field.

=== 2nd ODI ===
26 February 2020
14:30 (D/N)
Scorecard

Sri Lanka; 345/8 (50 overs)	v	West Indies; 184 (39.1 overs)
Avishka Fernando 127 (123); Sheldon Cottrell 4/67 (10 overs)		Shai Hope 51 (65); Wanindu Hasaranga 3/30 (10 overs)

Sri Lanka won by 161 runs
Mahinda Rajapaksa International Cricket Stadium, Hambantota
Umpires: Marais Erasmus (SA) and Lyndon Hannibal (SL)
Player of the match: Avishka Fernando (SL)

- West Indies won the toss and elected to field.
- Kusal Perera (SL) played in his 100th ODI.
- In terms of runs, this was Sri Lanka's biggest win against the West Indies in ODIs.

=== 3rd ODI ===
1 March 2020
14:30 (D/N)
Scorecard

Sri Lanka; 307 (50 overs)	v	West Indies; 301/9 (50 overs)
Kusal Mendis 55 (48); Alzarri Joseph 4/65 (10 overs)		Shai Hope 72 (88); Angelo Mathews 4/59 (10 overs)

Sri Lanka won by 6 runs
Pallekele International Cricket Stadium, Kandy
Umpires: Paul Wilson (Aus) and Raveendra Wimalasiri (SL)
Player of the match: Angelo Mathews (SL)

- Sri Lanka won the toss and elected to bat.

== T20I series ==
=== 1st T20I ===
4 March 2020
19:00 (N)
Scorecard

West Indies; 196/4 (20 overs)	v	Sri Lanka; 171 (19.1 overs)
Lendl Simmons 67* (51); Wanindu Hasaranga 1/33 (4 overs)		Kusal Perera 66 (38); Oshane Thomas 5/28 (3 overs)

West Indies won by 25 runs
Pallekele International Cricket Stadium, Kandy
Umpires: Ruchira Palliyaguruge (SL) and Prageeth Rambukwella (SL)
Player of the match: Oshane Thomas (WI)

- West Indies won the toss and elected to bat.
- Kieron Pollard (WI) played in his 500th Twenty20 match, and scored his 10,000th run in the format.
- Oshane Thomas (WI) took his first five-wicket haul in T20Is.

=== 2nd T20I ===
6 March 2020
19:00 (N)
Scorecard

Sri Lanka; 155/6 (20 overs)	v	West Indies; 158/3 (17 overs)
Dasun Shanaka 31* (24); Fabian Allen 2/24 (4 overs)		Brandon King 43 (21); Dasun Shanaka 1/10 (1 over)

West Indies won by 7 wickets
Pallekele International Cricket Stadium, Kandy
Umpires: Lyndon Hannibal (SL) and Raveendra Wimalasiri (SL)
Player of the match: Andre Russell (WI)

- West Indies won the toss and elected to field.

== Statistics ==
=== Most runs (ODI) ===
Rank	Runs	Player	Innings	Average	High Score	100	50
1	238	(Cricket West Indies) Shai Hope	3	79.33	115	1	2
2	206	(Sri Lanka) Avishka Fernando	3	68.66	127	1	1
3	194	(Sri Lanka) Kusal Mendis	3	64.66	119	1	1
4	106	(Sri Lanka) Thisara Perera	3	35.33	38	0	0
5	97	(Sri Lanka) Dimuth Karunaratne	3	32.33	52	0	1
Last Updated: 1 August 2020

=== Most wickets (ODI) ===
Rank	Wickets	Player	Innings	Best	Average	Economy
1	10	(Cricket West Indies) Alzarri Joseph	3	4/65	16.40	5.46
2	5	(Sri Lanka) Angelo Mathews	3	4/59	19.20	5.33
2	5	(Cricket West Indies) Sheldon Cottrel	3	4/67	38.80	6.46
3	4	(Sri Lanka) Wanindu Hasaranga	3	3/30	29.50	3.93
3	4	(Sri Lanka) Isuru Udana	3	3/82	44.75	7.45
4	3	(Sri Lanka) Nuwan Pradeep	3	2/37	33.66	4.92
4	3	(Sri Lanka) Lakshan Sandakan	3	3/57	43.33	6.78
4	3	(Cricket West Indies) Jason Holder	3	2/68	57.00	6.10
Last Updated: 1 August 2020

=== Most runs (T20I) ===
Rank	Runs	Player	Innings	Average	High Score	Strike Rate	50
1	81	(Sri Lanka) Kusal Perera	2	40.50	66	158.82	1
2	76	(Cricket West Indies) Brandon King	2	38.00	43	165.21	0
2	76	(Cricket West Indies) Lendl Simmons	2	76.00	67*	128.81	1
3	75	(Cricket West Indies) Andre Russell	2	75.00	40*	267.85	0
4	52	(Sri Lanka) Wanindu Hasaranga	2	26.00	44	123.80	0
5	43	(Cricket West Indies) Shimron Hetmyer	1	-	43*	102.38	0
Last Updated: 1 August 2020

=== Most wickets (T20I) ===
Rank	Wickets	Player	Innings	Best	Average	Economy
1	6	(Cricket West Indies) Oshane Thomas	2	5/28	8.66	7.42
2	2	(Cricket West Indies) Fabian Allen	1	2/24	12.00	6.00
2	2	(Cricket West Indies) Rovman Powell	1	2/31	15.50	7.75
2	2	(Cricket West Indies) Sheldon Cottrel	2	1/14	21.50	6.97
2	2	(Cricket West Indies) DJ Bravo	2	1/30	32.50	8.12
Last Updated: 1 August 2020

Sri Lankan cricket team in South Africa in 2020-21
