= Kandy Royals =

Kandy based franchise cricket team of the Lanka Premier League

- Logo of Kandy Royals
- League: Lanka Premier League

Personnel
- Captain: Angelo Mathews
- Coach: Chaminda Vaas

Team information
- City: Kandy, Central Province, Sri Lanka
- Colors: Purple Red
- Founded: 2020: Kandy Tuskers; 2021: Kandy Warriors; 2022 & 2024: Kandy Falcons; 2023: B-Love Kandy; 2026: Kandy Royals
- Home ground: Pallekele International Cricket Stadium, Kandy
- Capacity: 35,000

History
- LPL wins: 1 (2023)
- Official website: kandyroyals.net
T20I kit

Kandy Royals, formerly known as Kandy Falcons (in 2022 and 2024), B-Love Kandy (2023), Kandy Warriors (2021), and Kandy Tuskers (2020), is a Sri Lankan franchise professional Twenty20 cricket team founded in 2020 that competes in the Lanka Premier League (LPL), representing the city of Kandy, Sri Lanka.

== Franchise History ==
=== 2020 season ===
Chris Gayle signed up as the Marquee Overseas player and Kusal Perera as the Local Icon player for the inaugural edition of Lanka Premier League.

=== 2021 season ===
In October 2021, the team changed their name to Kandy Warriors after changing owners.

=== 2022 season ===
The team underwent three ownership and name changes in as many years. They further changed their name to Kandy Falcons in 2022. The team signed Wanindu Hasaranga as part of the pre-draft signing. Four West Indian players, Carlos Brathwaite, Fabian Allen, Oshane Thomas and Andre Fletcher were drafted in for the franchise later.

=== 2023 season ===
In 2023, prior to the LPL auction, the franchise was bought by the B-Love network led by Omar Khan. With the new ownership, the name of the Kandy franchise was changed to B-Love Kandy. In that season, the Kandy franchise won its maiden Lanka Premier League title.

=== 2024 season ===
Sri Lanka Cricket severed the contract with B-Love Kandy in May 2024 citing breaches of contractual obligations. Management of the team passed on to the tournament organisers, the IPG Group. The franchisee B-Love Network is a Dubai-based cryptocurrency business. However, B-Love Kandy participated in the player auction two days later.

=== 2026 season ===
In May 2026, the franchise was bought by Sandhya Ajjarapu, a US-based investor and entrepreneur, and the franchise rebranded as Kandy Royals under new ownership. Angelo Mathews, Moeen Ali, Vijay Shankar and Wanindu Hasaranga were signed as pre-draft signings.

== Current squad ==
- Sources: Cricinfo, ThePapare.com
- Players with international caps are listed in **bold**.
- denotes a player who was unavailable for rest of the season.

No.	Name	Nationality	Date of birth (age)	Batting style	Bowling style	Year signed	Salary (US$)	Notes
Batters
7	**Hassan Nawaz**	Pakistan	21 August 2002 (age 24)	Right handed	Right-arm medium-fast	2026	20,000	Replacement for Sediqullah Atal
23	Muditha Lakshan	Sri Lanka	20 December 2000 (age 25)	Right handed	Slow left arm Orthodox	2026	20,000	
95	Dale Phillips	New Zealand	15 October 1998 (age 28)	Right handed	Right-arm medium-fast	2026	20,000	
27	Pawan de Silva	Sri Lanka	21 November 2003 (age 22)	Right handed	Right-arm medium-fast	2026	10,000	
Wicket-keepers
32	**Lahiru Udara**	Sri Lanka	27 November 1993 (age 32)	Right handed	—N/a	2026	20,000	
153	**Kusal Perera**	Sri Lanka	7 August 1990 (age 36)	Left handed	—N/a	2026	30,000	
All-rounders
72	**Khushdil Shah**	Pakistan	7 February 1995 (age 31)	Left-handed	Slow left-arm Orthodox	2026	15,000	Replacement for Brandon McMullen
49	**Wanindu Hasaranga**	Sri Lanka	29 July 1997 (age 29)	Right handed	Right-arm leg break	2026	80,000	**Vice Captain**
69	**Angelo Mathews**	Sri Lanka	2 June 1987 (age 39)	Right handed	Right-arm medium-fast	2026	60,000	**Captain**
5	Kavija Gamage	Sri Lanka	27 March 2007 (age 19)	Right-handed	Right-arm off break	2026	20,000	Replacement for Vishen Halambage
59	**Vijay Shankar**	India	26 January 1991 (age 35)	Right handed	Right-arm medium-fast	2026	60,000	
34	**Dushan Hemantha**	Sri Lanka	24 May 1994 (age 32)	Right handed	Right arm Leg break	2026	30,000	
Spin bowlers
75	**Zahir Khan**	Afghanistan	20 December 1998 (age 27)	Left handed	Left-arm unorthodox spin	2026	20,000	
Pace bowlers
10	**Shaheen Afridi**	Pakistan	6 April 2000 (age 26)	Left-handed	Left arm fast	2026	30,000	
78	**Asitha Fernando**	Sri Lanka	31 July 1997 (age 29)	Right handed	Right-arm medium-fast	2026	30,000	
39	**Isitha Wijesundara**	Sri Lanka	11 May 1997 (age 29)	Left handed	Right-arm medium-fast	2026	20,000	
22	Sahan Mihira	Sri Lanka	1 May 2004 (age 22)	Right handed	Right-arm medium-fast	2026	10,000	
92	Garuka Sanketh	Sri Lanka	30 May 2005 (age 21)	Left handed	Right-arm medium-fast	2026	30,000	
53	**Nuwan Thushara**	Sri Lanka	6 August 1994 (age 32)	Right handed	Right-arm medium-fast	2026	50,000	

== Seasons ==
Year	League table standing	Final standing
2020	5th out of 5	League stage
2021	5th out of 5	League stage
2022	1st out of 5	Playoffs
2023	3rd out of 5	Champions
2024	4th out of 5	Playoffs
2026	4th out of 5	Playoffs

== Statistics ==
=== By season ===
Season	Pld	W	L	NR	Win%	Pos.	Summary	Most runs	Most wickets
2020	8	2	6	0	33.33	5/5	League Stage	Kusal Mendis (263)	Asela Gunaratne (9)
2021	8	2	6	0	33.33	5/5	League Stage	Kennar Lewis (168)	Nimesh Vimukthi (10)
2022	10	7	3	0	70.00	1/5	Playoffs	Andre Fletcher (266)	Carlos Brathwaite (18)
2023	11	7	4	0	63.63	3/5	Champions	Wanindu Hasaranga (279)	Wanindu Hasaranga (19)
2024	10	4	6	0	40.00	4/5	Playoffs	Andre Fletcher (321)	Wanindu Hasaranga (15)
2026	9	3	6	0	33.33	4/5	Playoffs	Lahiru Udara (434)	Nuwan Thushara (14)
Total	56	25	31	0	44.64		1 Title	Kamindu Mendis (782)	Wanindu Hasaranga (50)

- Source: Cricinfo

==== Most runs ====
As of 09 August 2026

Runs	Player	Seasons
782	Kamindu Mendis (Sri Lanka)	2020–2024
655	Angelo Mathews (Sri Lanka)	2023-2026
647	Wanindu Hasaranga (Sri Lanka)	2022-2026
587	Andre Fletcher (Cricket West Indies)	2022-2024
546	Dinesh Chandimal (Sri Lanka)	2023-2024
434	Lahiru Udara (Sri Lanka)	2026
401	Mohammad Haris (Pakistan)	2023-2024
305	Ashen Bandara (Sri Lanka)	2022-23
295	Kusal Perera (Sri Lanka)	2020–2026
263	Kusal Mendis (Sri Lanka)	2020

- Source: Cricinfo

=== Highest individual score ===
As of 9 August 2026

Runs	Player	Opposition	Venue	Date
132*	Lahiru Udara (Sri Lanka)	Galle Gallants	Pallekele	29 July 2026
102*	Andre Fletcher (Cricket West Indies)	Colombo Stars	Hambantota	6 December 2022
89	Dinesh Chandimal (Sri Lanka)	Jaffna Kings	Dambulla	9 July 2024
87	Kusal Perera (Sri Lanka)	Colombo Kings	Hambantota	26 November 2020
81	Mohammad Haris (Pakistan)	Jaffna Kings	Colombo	12 August 2023

- Source: Cricinfo

==== Most career wickets ====
As of 09 August 2026

Wickets.	Player	Seasons
50	Wanindu Hasaranga (Sri Lanka)	2022-2026
22	Nuwan Pradeep (Sri Lanka)	2020–2023
18	Carlos Brathwaite (Cricket West Indies)	2022
17	Isuru Udana (Sri Lanka)	2022-2023
14	Nuwan Thushara (Sri Lanka)	2026
14	Mohammad Hasnain (Pakistan)	2023-2024
13	Dasun Shanaka (Sri Lanka)	2024
11	Angelo Mathews (Sri Lanka)	2023-2026
10	Nimesh Vimukthi (Sri Lanka)	2021
10	Fabian Allen (Cricket West Indies)	2022

- Source: Cricinfo

==== Best figures in an innings ====
As of 09 August 2026

Figures	Player	Opposition	Venue	Date
6/9	Wanindu Hasaranga (Sri Lanka)	Jaffna Kings	Colombo	17 August 2023
4/11	Chamika Karunaratne (Sri Lanka)	Colombo Stars	Colombo	17 December 2022
4/14	Wanindu Hasaranga (Sri Lanka)	Colombo Stars	Hambantota	6 December 2022
4/14	Carlos Brathwaite (Cricket West Indies)	Galle Gladiators	Hambantota	7 December 2022
4/18	Carlos Brathwaite (Cricket West Indies)	Jaffna Kings	Pallekele	14 December 2022

- Source: Cricinfo

== Captains ==
No.	Player	From	To	Mat	Won	Lost	Tied	NR	Win%
1	Kusal Perera (Sri Lanka)	2020	2020	8	2	5	1	0	28.57
2	Angelo Perera (Sri Lanka)	2021	2021	8	2	6	0	0	25.00
3	Wanindu Hasaranga (Sri Lanka)	2022	2026	20	13	7	0	0	65.00
4	Angelo Mathews (Sri Lanka)	2023	2026	9	4	5	0	0	44.44

Source: ESPNcricinfo, Last updated: 05 August 2026

== Administration and support staff ==
=== Coaching history ===
Season	Head coach	Assistant coach
2020	Hashan Tillakaratne	
2021	Lalchand Rajput	Ruvin Peiris
2022	Piyal Wijetunge	Tharanga Dhammika
2023	Mushtaq Ahmed	Piyal Wijetunge
2024	Mushtaq Ahmed	Piyal Wijetunge
2026	Chaminda Vaas	Upul Chandana

== Team identity ==
=== Anthem ===
Year	Anthem	Artist(s)
2021		Isuru Withanage, Shanthi Sri, Gayana Lewke, Chan Chan
2023		Isuru Withanage, Ishari Munasingha, Chan Chan, Jay DC
2024		Isuru Withanage, Chan Chan, Shanthi Sri

=== Kit manufacturers and sponsors ===
Year	Kit manufacturer	Shirt sponsor (front)	Shirt sponsor (back)	Chest branding	Sleeve branding
2020		JAT Paints	—		WHITE by JAT
2021		FairPlay News	Safexpay	—N/a	Vernost Marketing, Vivandi
2022	Speed Sports	MazaPlay		—N/a	—N/a
2023		BFICoin		Super11	Time2Travel, Bulleto
2024	SPD Clothing	—N/a			
2026	SPD Clothing	Kelun Lifesciences	RR Cleanroom Projects	Celogen	Rover Motorcycles Sri Lanka
