= JAT Holdings =

Sri Lankan paints manufacturer

JAT Holdings PLC
- Logo of JAT Holdings
- Type: Public
- Traded as: CSE: JAT.N0000
- ISIN: LK0469N00003
- Industry: Materials
- Founded: July 1, 1993; 33 years ago
- Founder: Joyce Gunawardene; Aelian Gunawardene; Tyrone Gunawardene
- Headquarters: Thalawathugoda, Sri Lanka
- Key people: Sivakumar Selliah (Chairman); Aelian Gunawardene (Managing Director); Nishal Ferdinando (CEO)
- Products: WHITE by JAT; Sayerlack; Harris Brushes & Rollers; Herman Miller; SEA; Houros
- Revenue: ▲LKR2.603 billion (2021/22)
- Operating income: ▲LKR1,186 billion (2021/22)
- Net income: ▲LKR1,211 billion (2021/22)
- Total assets: ▲LKR11,544 billion (2021/22)
- Total equity: ▲LKR7,747 billion (2021/22)
- Owner: Aelian Gunawardene (65.014%)
- Number of employees: ▲386 (2021/22)
- Website: jatholdings.com

JAT Holdings PLC is a Sri Lanka based multinational paint company headquartered in Thalawathugoda, Sri Lanka. The company is engaged in the business of manufacturing, selling and distribution of paints, wood coatings and products related to the retail and industrial sectors. As of 2016, it has the largest market share with 75% in the Sri Lankan paint industry.

== History ==
The company was started in 1993 by Joyce Gunawardene, Aelian Gunawardene and Tyrone Gunawardene and named the company from the initials of the three founding brothers. The company first became the principal agent of the Italian multinational company Sayerlack and introduced polyurethane coatings in Sri Lanka. In 2002, the company set up a large scale manufacturing plant in Kahathuduwa.

In 2015, the company acquired Ceynox Networks, an information technology company and created the JAT Technologies. In 2017, the company signed cricketer Rangana Herath as their brand ambassador.

In 2020, JAT Holdings was ranked amongst the LMD's Top 20 Conglomerate Brands in Sri Lanka.

In 2021 JAT Holdings was listed in the Colombo Stock Exchange (CSE), .

== Business ==
The company is a manufacturer of paints and coatings; and also a distributor of brands including Sayerlack, Harris, BormaWachs, Norton, Brush Master, Masters, J CHEM. JAT holdings also offer a furnishing range of brands such as Herman Miller, SEA and Houros. The company entered the real estate development in 1995 and developed residential colonies in the country.

== Sponsorships ==
The company is one of the major sponsor of sports in the country and has sponsored several events for cricket, tennis, golf and other major sports.
