= Sri Lankan cricket team in Australia in 2010–11 =

Sri Lankan cricket team in Australia in 2010
| | Sri Lanka | Australia |
- Dates: 31 October 2010 – 7 November 2010
| Captains | Kumar Sangakkara | Michael Clarke (T20I, 1st and 3rd ODIs); Ricky Ponting (2nd ODI) |

One Day International series
- Results: Sri Lanka won the 3-match series 2–1
| Most runs | Upul Tharanga (117) | Michael Clarke (102) |
| Most wickets | Thisara Perera (7) | Clint McKay (5) |
- Player of the series: Lasith Malinga (SL)

Twenty20 International series
- Results: Sri Lanka won the 1-match series 1–0
| Most runs | Kumar Sangakkara (44) | Brad Haddin (35) |
| Most wickets | Suraj Randiv (3) | Peter Siddle (1) |
- Player of the series: Suraj Randiv (SL)

The Sri Lankan cricket team toured Australia between 31 October and 7 November 2010. The tour consisted of one T20I and three One Day Internationals. Sri Lanka's One Day International series victory was their first series win in Australia.

== T20I series ==
=== Only T20I ===
31 October
Scorecard

| Australia; 8/133 (20 overs) | v | Sri Lanka; 3/135 (16.3 overs) |
| Brad Haddin 35 (30); Suraj Randiv 3/25 (4 overs) | | Kumar Sangakkara 44* (43); Dirk Nannes 1/28 (3 overs) |

Sri Lanka won by 7 wickets
WACA Ground, Perth
Umpires: Bruce Oxenford (Aus) and Paul Reiffel (Aus)
Player of the match: Suraj Randiv (SL)

- Australia won the toss and elected to bat.
- John Hastings and Clint McKay (both Aus) made their T20I debuts.

== ODI series ==
=== 1st ODI ===
3 November
Scorecard

| Australia; 8/239 (50 overs) | v | Sri Lanka; 9/243 (44.2 overs) |
| Michael Hussey 71* (91); Thisara Perera 5/46 (8 overs) | | Angelo Mathews 77* (84); Xavier Doherty 4/46 (10 overs) |

Sri Lanka won by 1 wicket
Melbourne Cricket Ground, Melbourne
Umpires: Marais Erasmus (SA) and Paul Reiffel (Aus)
Player of the match: Angelo Mathews (SL)

- Australia won the toss and elected to bat.
- Xavier Doherty (Aus) made his ODI debut.
- The Sri Lankan partnership between Angelo Mathews and Lasith Malinga for 132 runs was the highest ninth wicket partnership in ODI cricket.

=== 2nd ODI ===
5 November
Scorecard

| Sri Lanka; 3/213 (41.1 overs) | v | Australia; 210 (37.4 overs) |
| Upul Tharanga 86* (112); Shane Watson 2/34 (8 overs) | | Shane Watson 40 (44); Muttiah Muralitharan 2/30 (7 overs) |

Sri Lanka won by 29 runs (D/L)
Sydney Cricket Ground, Sydney
Umpires: Marais Erasmus (SA) and Bruce Oxenford (Aus)
Player of the match: Upul Tharanga (SL)

- Sri Lanka won the toss and elected to bat.
- Rain first reduced the match to 45 overs per side. The Sri Lankan innings stopped after 41.1 overs due to further rain and Australia's target was adjusted to 240 runs from 38 overs according to the Duckworth–Lewis method.

=== 3rd ODI ===
7 November
Scorecard

| Sri Lanka; 115 (32 overs) | v | Australia; 2/119 (21.4 overs) |
| Chamara Silva 33 (72); Clint McKay 5/33 (9 overs) | | Michael Clarke 50* (51); Dilhara Fernando 2/47 (8 overs) |

Australia won by 8 wickets
Brisbane Cricket Ground, Woolloongabba, Brisbane
Umpires: Marais Erasmus (SA) and Paul Reiffel (Aus)
Player of the match: Clint McKay (Aus)

- Sri Lanka won the toss and elected to bat.

== Tour matches ==
=== List A: Queensland vs Sri Lankans ===
22 October
Scorecard

| Sri Lankans; 7/301 (50 overs) | v | Queensland; 189 (36.1 overs) |
| Kumar Sangakkara 110 (95); Ben Laughlin 3/54 (10 overs) | | Craig Philipson 69 (62); Dilhara Fernando 4/41 (6.1 overs) |

Sri Lankans won by 112 runs
The Gabba, Woolloongabba, Brisbane
Umpires: Simon Fry (Aus) and Bruce Oxenford (Aus)

- Sri Lankans won the toss and elected to bat.

=== List A: New South Wales vs Sri Lankans ===
24 October
Scorecard

| New South Wales | v | Sri Lankans |

Match abandoned without a ball bowled
Sydney Cricket Ground, Sydney
Umpires: Bob Parry (Aus) and Tony Ward (Aus)

=== Twenty20: New South Wales vs Sri Lankans ===
27 October
Scorecard

| Sri Lankans; 4/167 (20 overs) | v | New South Wales; 2/100 (14 overs) |
| Mahela Jayawardene 59 (35); Steve O'Keefe 1/21 (4 overs) | | Usman Khawaja 32 (37); Suraj Randiv 2/13 (3 overs) |

Sri Lankans won by 22 runs (D/L)
Blacktown Olympic Park Oval, Sydney
Umpires: Gerard Abood (Aus) and Tony Ward (Aus)

- Sri Lankans won the toss and elected to bat.
- Rain reduced New South Wales' target to 123 runs from 14 overs according to the Duckworth–Lewis method.

== Media coverage ==
=== Television ===
- Star Cricket: India and Sri Lanka
- Sky Sports: UK
- Nine Network/GEM: Australia
- Arab Radio and Television Network: Middle East
- Willow Cricket: USA
- ATN Cricket Plus: Canada
