= Sayerlack =

Italian wood coatings company

- Industry: Chemical
- Founded: 16 May 1954
- Founder: Giancarlo Cocchi
- Headquarters: Pianoro, Italy
- Key people: Alessandro Pirotta (General Manager)
- Parent: The Sherwin-Williams Company
- Website: Sayerlack.com

Sayerlack is an Italian multinational company leading the wood coatings market. The company, which employs over 300 people in Italy, has two production sites: the main one is in Pianoro (Bologna), and the second one is in Mariano Comense (Como). The R&D laboratories are located in Pianoro and in Mariano Comense. Headquarters and sales offices are in Pianoro. Production is mainly dedicated to the industrial market, with the Linea Pro professional products; the DIY market is served by the Linea Blu product range. Sayerlack distributes its products in over 80 countries worldwide through its foreign branches (France, Great Britain, Spain, Singapore and the USA) and a global distribution network. Since 2010, the Sayerlack brand has belonged to the American Group Sherwin-Williams, the leading coating company in America and the third in the world.

== History ==
Sayerlack was established in 1954 in Bologna for the purposes of producing coatings to finish, protect and ennoble wood, with particular emphasis on furniture, accessories for furniture and fittings. In 1958, the first R&D centre opened, and in 1988, the first waterborne coatings were created, representing an innovative product for the industry. In 1987, the British Group Hickson International PLC acquired 100% of the company. In 1990, following a series of acquisitions by Hickson International PLC, Hickson Coatings Europa was born; in December 1993, Hickson Coatings Italia was created. In July 2000, the American Group Arch Chemicals, Inc. acquired 90% of the shares of Hickson International PLC and starting from August 2000 Hickson Coatings Italia S.p.A. (owner of the Sayerlack brand) became part of it. In 2010, the American multinational corporation Sherwin-Williams acquired Sayerlack.

== Products ==
The range of Sayerlack products comprises polyurethane, water-based, nitrocellulose, polyester, UV and water-based UV coatings, and stains. Coatings are designed for bathroom, kitchen, living room, bedroom furniture, parquet flooring, doors and windows, nautical furnishing, and picture frames; besides these products, the Sayerlack range includes fire retardant and antibacterial coatings, and stains for wood.
