= Oshane Thomas =

Jamaican cricketer (born 1997)

Personal information
- Full name: Oshane Romaine Thomas
- Born: 18 February 1997 (age 29); Kingston, Jamaica
- Height: 6 ft 6 in (198 cm)
- Batting: Left-handed
- Bowling: Right-arm fast
- Role: Bowler

International information
- National side: West Indies (2018–2024)
- ODI debut (cap 186): 21 October 2018 v India
- Last ODI: 4 February 2024 v Australia
- T20I debut (cap 77): 4 November 2018 v India
- Last T20I: 16 December 2021 v Pakistan

Domestic team information
- Years: Team
- 2016–present: Jamaica
- 2016–present: Jamaica Tallawahs
- 2019: Rangpur Riders
- 2019: Rajasthan Royals
- 2021: Northern Warriors
- 2022: Comilla Victorians
- 2022: Kandy Falcons
- 2023: St Kitts and Nevis Patriots
- 2024-present: Khulna Tigers

Career statistics
Competition	ODI	T20I	FC	LA
Matches	20	20	9	41
Runs scored	13	9	55	73
Batting average	2.60	2.25	4.58	5.21
100s/50s	0/0	0/0	0/0	0/0
Top score	6*	8*	18	13
Balls bowled	771	384	1,121	1,757
Wickets	27	21	17	58
Bowling average	32.07	28.66	40.88	32.41
5 wickets in innings	1	1	0	1
10 wickets in match	0	0	0	0
Best bowling	5/21	5/28	3/66	5/21
Catches/stumpings	0/0	1/0	0/0	11/0
- Source: ESPNcricinfo, 6 August 2022

Oshane Romaine Thomas (born 18 February 1997) is a Jamaican cricketer. A fast bowler, he made his international debut for the West Indies cricket team in October 2018. In August 2019, Cricket West Indies named him as the Emerging Player of the Year.

== Domestic and franchise career ==
He made his first-class debut for Jamaica in the 2016–17 Regional Four Day Competition on 18 November 2016. He represented the Jamaica Tallawahs in two games in the 2016 CPL season, and was then retained for the 2017 edition. He made his List A debut for Jamaica in the 2017–18 Regional Super50 on 2 February 2018.

In October 2018, he was named in the squad for the Rangpur Riders team, following the draft for the 2018–19 Bangladesh Premier League.

In December 2018, he was bought by the Rajasthan Royals in the player auction for the 2019 Indian Premier League. In March 2019, he was named as one of eight players to watch by the International Cricket Council (ICC) ahead of the 2019 Indian Premier League tournament. In October 2019, he was named in Jamaica's squad for the 2019–20 Regional Super50 tournament. In the 2020 IPL auction, he was bought by the Rajasthan Royals ahead of the 2020 Indian Premier League.

In July 2020, he was named in the Jamaica Tallawahs squad for the 2020 Caribbean Premier League.

In 2023, he joined Frocester in Gloucestershire.

== International career ==
In October 2018, he was named in the West Indies' One Day International (ODI) and Twenty20 International (T20I) squads for series against India. He made his ODI debut for the West Indies against India on 21 October 2018. His first international wicket was that of Shikhar Dhawan.

He made his (T20I) debut for the West Indies against India on 4 November 2018, taking the wickets of Rohit Sharma and Shikhar Dhawan. In January 2019, he was named in the West Indies' Test squad for their series against England as a cover for Alzarri Joseph, but he did not play. In March 2019, during the ODI series against England, Thomas took his first five-wicket haul in ODIs.

In April 2019, he was named in the West Indies' squad for the 2019 Cricket World Cup. Thomas was named man of the match in the West Indies' opening match against Pakistan. In July 2019, Cricket West Indies awarded him with a central contract for the first time, ahead of the 2019–20 season. On 4 March 2020, in the first match against Sri Lanka, Thomas took his first five-wicket haul in a T20I match.

In June 2020, Thomas was named as one of eleven reserve players in the West Indies' Test squad, for their series against England. The Test series was originally scheduled to start in May 2020, but was moved back to July 2020 due to the COVID-19 pandemic.

In September 2021, Thomas was named in the West Indies' squad for the 2021 ICC Men's T20 World Cup.

In February 2024, Thomas made his return to the West Indies international team for the ODI West Indies Tour of Australia.
