= Piyal Wijetunge =

Sri Lankan cricketer (born 1971)

Personal information
- Full name: Piyal Kashyapa Wijetunge
- Born: August 6, 1971 (age 55); Badulla, Sri Lanka
- Batting: Right-handed
- Bowling: Slow left-arm orthodox
- Role: Bowler

International information
- National side: Sri Lanka (1993)
- Only Test (cap 58): 25 August 1993 v South Africa

Domestic team information
- Years: Team
- 1990–1994: Sinhalese Sports Club
- 1995–1996: Bloomfield Cricket and Athletic Club
- 1998: Moors Sports Club
- 2002: Kandy Cricket Club

Career statistics
Competition	Test	FC	LA
Matches	1	65	7
Runs scored	10	541	1
Batting average	5.00	11.27	1.00
100s/50s	0/0	0/1	0/0
Top score	10	52	1*
Balls bowled	312	9,559	288
Wickets	2	161	7
Bowling average	59.00	30.47	21.42
5 wickets in innings	0	3	0
10 wickets in match	0	1	0
Best bowling	1/58	7/51	3/15
Catches/stumpings	0/–	24/–	1/–
- Source: ESPNcricinfo, 11 April 2017

Piyal Kashyapa Wijetunge (born 6 August 1971) is a former Sri Lankan cricketer who played in one Test match in 1993. Though he was not successful in the international arena, he was an active member in the domestic arena, where he played 65 first class matches and took 161 wickets as well. He was born at Badulla in 1971.

He has served as a spin bowling coach for the Sri Lanka national team, where he trained international players such as Rangana Herath, Tharindu Kaushal and Dilruwan Perera.

== See also ==
- One-Test wonder
