= Wanindu Hasaranga =

Sri Lankan cricketer (born 1997)

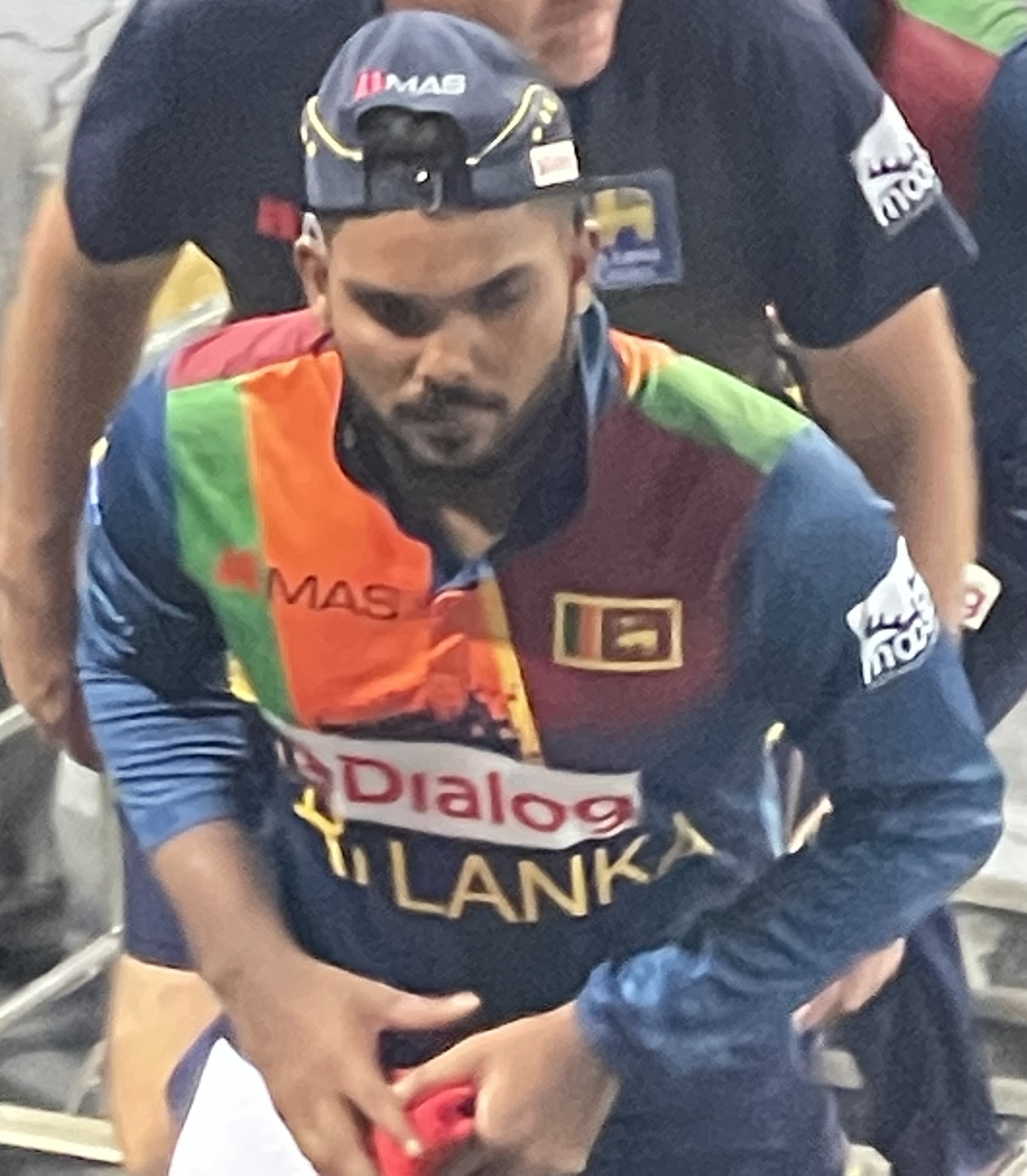
- Hasaranga in 2022

Personal information
- Full name: Pinnaduwage Wanindu Hasaranga de Silva
- Born: 29 July 1997 (age 29); Galle, Sri Lanka
- Batting: Right-handed
- Bowling: Right-arm Leg break
- Role: All-rounder
- Relatives: Chaturanga de Silva (brother)

International information
- National side: Sri Lanka (2017–present)
- Test debut (cap 151): 26 December 2020 v South Africa
- Last Test: 21 April 2021 v Bangladesh
- ODI debut (cap 180): 2 July 2017 v Zimbabwe
- Last ODI: 6 June 2026 v West Indies
- ODI shirt no.: 49
- T20I debut (cap 80): 1 September 2019 v New Zealand
- Last T20I: 14 June 2026 v West Indies
- T20I shirt no.: 49

Domestic team information
- Years: Team
- 2015/16–present: Colombo
- 2017/18: Sylhet Sixers
- 2020/21–2021: Jaffna Kings
- 2021–2023: Royal Challengers Bangalore
- 2020/21: Deccan Gladiators
- 2022–present: Kandy Royals
- 2023–present: Desert Vipers
- 2024; 2026: St Kitts & Nevis Patriots
- 2025: Rajasthan Royals
- 2026/27–present: Team Paktia

Career statistics
Competition	Test	ODI	T20I	T20
Matches	4	71	98	258
Runs scored	196	1,142	831	2,667
Batting average	28.00	23.30	13.40	16.87
100s/50s	0/1	0/5	0/2	0/9
Top score	59	80*	71	77*
Balls bowled	674	3,305	2,184	5,435
Wickets	4	113	161	355
Bowling average	100.75	24.84	15.90	18.09
5 wickets in innings	0	4	0	3
10 wickets in match	0	0	0	0
Best bowling	4/171	7/19	4/9	6/9
Catches/stumpings	2/–	19/–	39/–	115/–
- Source: Cricinfo, 25 August 2026

Pinnaduwage Wanindu Hasaranga de Silva (Sinhala: වනිඳු හසරංග, [ˈʋaniⁿd̪u ɦasəraŋgə] (Note: [ⁿd̪] is a Prenasalized consonant.); born 29 July 1997) is a Sri Lankan international cricketer who plays for the Sri Lanka national team as an all-rounder. Hasaranga made history when he took the first ever hat-trick for Sri Lanka in a T20 World Cup during the 2021 edition of the tournament, and being the first Sri Lankan on a One Day International debut to take a hat-trick.

== Early years ==
Wanindu Hasaranga de Silva was educated at Richmond College, Galle, where he started his cricket career. He represented Sri Lankan under 19 cricket team at the Under-19 Cricket World Cup held in Bangladesh in 2016.

At the age of 16, he played as a frontline seam bowler and even opened the bowling for Richmonds College cricket team. However, he switched to bowling leg-spin after witnessing a demonstration by his coach Lanka de Silva who taught him on how to bowl leg spin. He soon followed the footsteps of his coach and transformed into a leg-spinner. It was the coach who identified the potential on him to convert him into a leg-spinner after realizing Hasaranga's great arm speed. He also underwent a pace-to-spin bowling transformation workshop and also took part in an age group 50 over local tournament at the age of 17 where he bagged a tally of 28 wickets in just 6 matches.

== Domestic and franchise career ==
Hasaranga made his List A debut on 30 November 2015 in the AIA Premier Limited Over Tournament. In December 2015, he was named in Sri Lanka's squad for the 2016 Under-19 Cricket World Cup. He took seven wickets in the 2016 U19 World Cup which also included a match winning bowling performance of 3/34 against England in the quarter-final of the tournament to help Sri Lanka reach semi-final stage.

He made his first-class debut for Sri Lanka Ports Authority Cricket Club in the 2015–16 Premier League Tournament, on 26 February 2016.

In November 2017, Hasaranga was named the most promising player in domestic cricket for the 2016–17 season at Sri Lanka Cricket's annual awards. He gained limelight for his all-round efforts scoring 586 runs including a century averaging just under 40 with a strike rate of 93 and taking 15 wickets including a five-wicket haul in the 2016-17 domestic FC season.

He made his Twenty20 debut for Sylhet Sixers on 11 November 2017 in the 2017–18 Bangladesh Premier League.

In March 2018, Hasaranga was named in Colombo's squad for the 2017–18 Super Four Provincial Tournament. The following month, he was also named in Colombo's squad for the 2018 Super Provincial One Day Tournament. In August 2018, he was named in Dambulla's squad the 2018 SLC T20 League.

Hasaranga was the leading run-scorer for Colombo Cricket Club in the 2018–19 Premier League Tournament, with 765 runs in nine matches. In March 2019, he was named in Galle's squad for the 2019 Super Provincial One Day Tournament. In October 2020, he was drafted by the Jaffna Stallions for the inaugural edition of the Lanka Premier League. He was named the player of the tournament, after taking seventeen wickets.

In August 2021, Hasaranga was included in the Royal Challengers Bangalore squad for the second phase of the 2021 Indian Premier League (IPL) in the UAE. He made his IPL debut on 20 September 2021 against Kolkata Knight Riders. In November 2021, he was selected to play for the Jaffna Kings following the players' draft for the 2021 Lanka Premier League.

In the 2022 IPL Auction, Hasaranga was bought by the Royal Challengers Bangalore. He delivered his best bowling figures in an IPL match and the best for any bowler at the Wankhede Stadium when he took 5 for 18 against Sunrisers Hyderabad in May 2022. In April 2022, he was bought by the Manchester Originals for the 2022 season of The Hundred in England. In July 2022, he was signed by the Kandy Falcons for the third edition of the Lanka Premier League. In 2022, Hasaranga was signed up by Quetta Gladiators for the PSL 8.

In 2022, Hasaranga was signed by Desert Vipers in International League T20. He played for Desert Vipers in 2023, he ended up being third highest wicket-taker scalping 9 wickets. Hasaranga played the Major League Cricket in the US, as he was signed by Washington Freedom in 2023. Before 2024 IPL, the Royal Challengers Bangalore released Hasaranga and was signed by Sunrisers Hyderabad for ₹1.5 crore (equivalent to ₹1.6 crore or US$170,000 in 2026) in the auction. In the IPL 2025 auction, he was acquired by Rajasthan Royals for ₹5.25 crore (equivalent to ₹5.6 crore or US$600,000 in 2026). In the IPL 2026 auction, he was acquired by Lucknow Super Giants for ₹2 crore (equivalent to ₹2.1 crore or US$220,000 in 2026).

== International career ==
=== Early years ===
Hasaranga was named to Sri Lanka's One Day International (ODI) squad for their series against Zimbabwe. He made his ODI debut for Sri Lanka against Zimbabwe on 2 July 2017. In his debut match, he took the final three Zimbabwe wickets in the innings in three consecutive deliveries, becoming the youngest bowler to take a hat-trick on debut in an ODI. He was also the third debutant in ODI history to claim a hat-trick after Bangladeshi Taijul Islam and South African Kagiso Rabada. He also became the first leg-spinner to take a hat-trick in ODI history.

In May 2018, Hasaranga was one of 33 cricketers to be awarded a national contract by Sri Lanka Cricket ahead of the 2018–19 season. In August 2019, he was named in Sri Lanka's Twenty20 International (T20I) squad for their series against New Zealand. He made his T20I debut for Sri Lanka, against New Zealand, on 1 September 2019.

In September 2019, Hasaranga was included as the only specialist spinner for the Pakistan series in Pakistan, where many major players withdrew from the team due to security concerns. During the T20I series, he took eight wickets, where Sri Lanka dominated against Pakistan. Sri Lanka won all three matches and whitewashed Pakistan for the first time. It was Sri Lanka's first ever series win against Pakistan in a T20I bilateral series. Sri Lanka went on to win the final T20I match by 13 runs, winning the series 3–0. It was the first time in a three-match T20I series that Sri Lanka had won 3–0, and the first time that Pakistan had been whitewashed. Due to his match winning all round performances, Hasaranga was adjudged as man of the match in the third T20I as well as was adjudged player of the series.

During the ODI series against West Indies in March 2020, Hasaranga showed his all round talent where he took crucial wickets at the right time and scored match winning knocks. In the first ODI, he scored match winning unbeaten 42 runs to seal the game for Sri Lanka by 1 wicket. He also won the man off the match award. In second and third ODI, he delivered the most economical spells for Sri Lanka. Sri Lanka won the series 3–0 with Hasaranga winning player of the series award.

In December 2020, Hasaranga was named in Sri Lanka's Test squad for their series against South Africa. He made his Test debut for Sri Lanka, against South Africa, on 26 December 2020. He took four wickets in the match for 171 runs. In the second innings, Hasaranga scored his maiden Test fifty.

On 14 March 2021, in the third ODI against the West Indies, Hasaranga scored his maiden ODI half century. He along with Ashen Bandara put on an unbeaten 123 run seventh wicket stand in the match. He also registered the highest individual score for Sri Lanka batting at number 8 or lower with scoring unbeaten 80 off just 60 deliveries breaking the previous record held by Nuwan Kulasekara.

=== Rising through ranks ===
After many economical bowling spells in the T20I series against England and India, Hasaranga achieved second rank in the ICC T20I rankings in July 2021. In July 2021, during the series against India, Hasaranga took four wickets in the third T20I match. He also broke the record of Imran Tahir for registering the best ever bowling spell in a T20I match on birthday with an economic spell of 4/9 in four overs. He won the player of the match award and was also named the player of the series.

In September 2021, Hasaranga was named in Sri Lanka's squad for the 2021 ICC Men's T20 World Cup. On 30 October 2021, in Sri Lanka's match against South Africa, Hasaranga became the first bowler for Sri Lanka to take a hat-trick in a T20 World Cup match. On 1 November 2021, in the match against England, Hasaranga took his 50th wicket in T20I cricket. He ended the 2021 ICC World Twenty20 as the leading wicket taker of the tournament and broke the record of Ajantha Mendis for having taken the most wickets in a single edition of the ICC Men's T20 World Cup after finishing the 2021 edition with 16 wickets. Out of the 16 scalps, 10 of them came in the Super 12 stage of the tournament.

In November 2021, he achieved his career best ranking in ICC T20I bowling rankings when he topped the rankings for the first time in his career. He became only the second Sri Lankan after Ajantha Mendis to become no 1 bowler in ICC T20I rankings. In the same month, he also reached career best third rank in ICC T20I rankings for all-rounders. He also equalled with South Africa's Tabraiz Shamsi for taking most number of wickets in T20Is in a single calendar year. Both of them took the same tally of 36 dismissals in 2021 to end up as joint-leading wicket-takers across all T20I matches in 2021.

In the annual ICC Awards in January 2022, Wanindu Hasaranga was included in the ICC Men's ODI Team of the Year, and the ICC Men's T20I Team of the Year. During the 2022 Asia Cup, Hasaranga made match-winning all-round performances against Bangladesh and Pakistan. Against Pakistan in the Super 4 match, Hasaranga took 3 wickets for 21 runs and Pakistan finally bowled out for 121 runs. Sri Lanka won the match by 5 wickets and Hasaranga won the man of the match award as well. In the final against Pakistan, Sri Lanka batted first and restricted to 58/5 in 8.5 overs. However, along with Bhanuka Rajapaksa, he made a match-winning partnership of 58-runs, where Sri Lanka posted 170 runs. Sri Lanka eventually won the match and became sixth time Asia Cup champions. Hasaranga was adjudged player of the tournament for his all-round performances. Due to his performances with 36 runs and 3/27, Hasaranga became only the second player after West Indian Carlos Brathwaite, to score 30-plus runs and three-plus wickets in a men's T20I knockout between two Full-Member nations.

The annual ICC Awards in January 2023 saw Hasaranga get included in the 2022 T20i Team for the second consecutive year. In June 2023, Hasaranga was named in Sri Lanka's squad for the 2023 Cricket World Cup Qualifiers in Zimbabwe. In the opening match, Hasaranga took 6 wickets against UAE picking up his first 6-wicket haul in ODIs. Against Afghanistan in February 2024 in second T20I, Hasaranga became the second fastest bowler after Afghan Rashid Khan to claim 100 T20 international wickets.

In May 2024, he was named the captain in Sri Lanka's squad for the 2024 ICC Men's T20 World Cup tournament.

== Awards ==
- ICC Men's ODI Team of the Year: 2021, 2024
- ICC Men's T20I Team of the Year: 2021, 2022, 2024
- Sri Lanka Cricket Best Men's ODI All-rounder of the Year: 2025
