= Pallekele International Cricket Stadium =

Cricket stadium in Sri Lanka

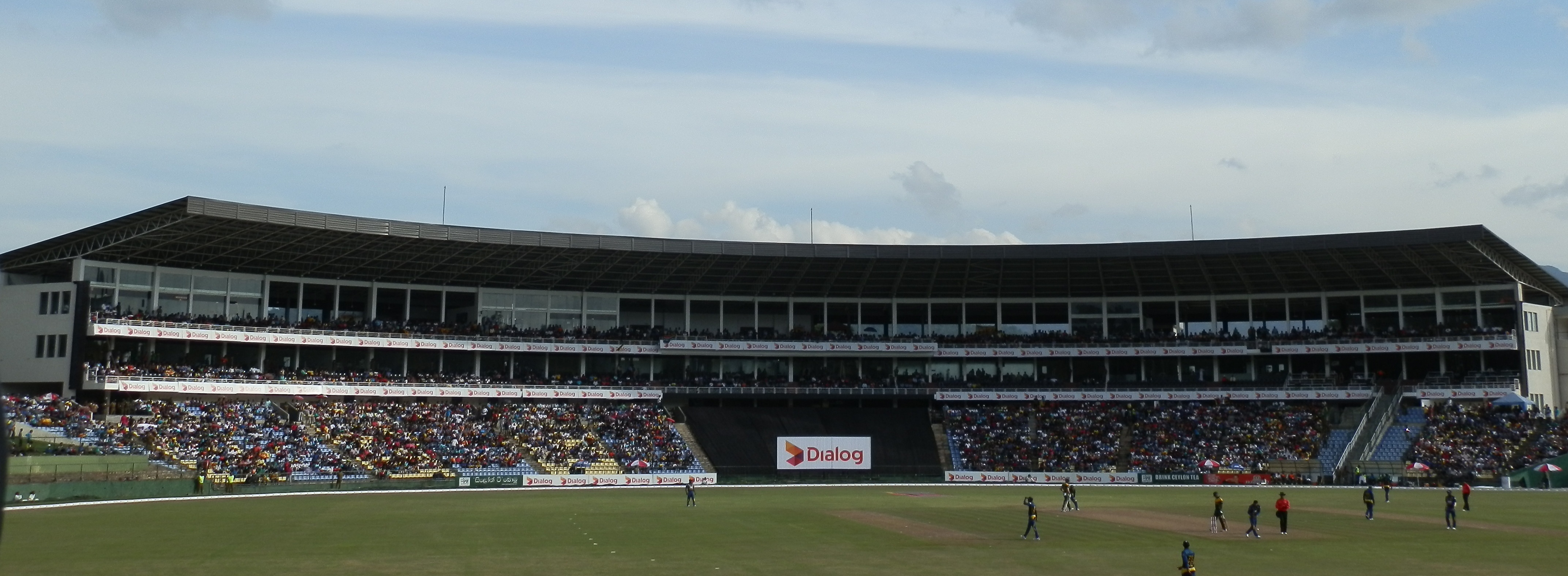
- Interactive map of Pallekele International Cricket Stadium

Ground information
- Location: Pallekele, Kandy
- Country: Sri Lanka
- Coordinates: 7°16′49″N 80°43′20″E
- Establishment: 27 November 2009
- Capacity: 35,000
- Owner: Sri Lanka Cricket
- End names
- Hunnasgiriya End; Rikillagaskada End

International information
- First men's Test: 1–5 December 2010: Sri Lanka v West Indies
- Last men's Test: 29 April–3 May 2021: Sri Lanka v Bangladesh
- First men's ODI: 8 March 2011: New Zealand v Pakistan
- Last men's ODI: 8 July 2025: Sri Lanka v Bangladesh
- First men's T20I: 6 August 2011: Sri Lanka v Australia
- Last men's T20I: 24 February 2026: England v Pakistan
- First women's ODI: 1 July 2022: Sri Lanka v India
- Last women's ODI: 7 July 2022: Sri Lanka v India

Team information
Sri Lanka national cricket team	(2010 – present)
Kandy Falcons	(2020 – present)
- As of 31 January 2026; Source: Cricinfo

Pallekele International Cricket Stadium (Sinhala: පල්ලෙකැලේ ජාත්‍යන්තර ක්‍රිකට් ක්‍රීඩාංගනය, Tamil: பல்லேகல சர்வதேச கிரிக்கெட் மைதானம்) is a cricket stadium in Kandy, Sri Lanka. It is located about 15 km (9.3 mi) east of Kandy along the A26 highway. It is owned by the Sri Lanka Cricket Board and has a capacity of 35,000. The stadium opened on 27 November 2009 and became the 104th ground to host Test cricket in December 2010.

== History ==
Layout of the stadium

The stadium was built at a cost of $3.93 million to serve as one of the three host venues for the 2011 Cricket World Cup, which was co-hosted by Sri Lanka. It was completed in 2009 and hosted junior cricket matches in preparation for hosting international cricket. In July 2010, the Central Provincial Council in Kandy announced plans to rename the stadium after Sri Lankan cricketer Muttiah Muralitharan, however it was not officially renamed. The stadium hosted the first Test match between Sri Lanka and the West Indies from 1 to 5 December 2010. The first One Day International (ODI) match at the venue was played between New Zealand and Pakistan on 8 March 2011 during the 2011 World Cup. The stadium hosted three matches during the World Cup. On 21 September 2011, it was announced that the stadium would host nine matches during the 2012 ICC World Twenty20 in September–October 2012. On 16 November 2025, the International Cricket Council finalized the venues for the 2026 Men's T20 World Cup and the Pallekele stadium is scheduled to host seven games during the tournament.

== Notable events ==
- On 1 December 2010, Sri Lanka's Suranga Lakmal became the third bowler to take a wicket with the first ball bowled in a Test match at a new venue, after Kapil Dev and Imran Khan.
- On 26 March 2011, Tillakaratne Dilshan and Upul Tharanga added a 282-run partnership for the first wicket for Sri Lanka in an ODI against Zimbabwe, which was the highest partnership for the first wicket in a Cricket World Cup.
- Shaun Marsh and Mike Hussey added 258 runs for the fourth wicket for Australia against Sri Lanka, which is the highest fourth wicket partnership in Test matches between Sri Lanka and Australia.
- Dilshan scored a century against Australia in a Twenty20 International (T20I) match during Australia's tour of Sri Lanka in 2011, becoming the second Sri Lankan to score centuries in all formats. This was the highest individual innings by a Sri Lankan in T20Is, and made Dilshan the first ever cricketer to score centuries in all formats as a captain.
- Steve O'Keefe, Peter Nevill and Josh Hazlewood of Australia faced a record 25.4 consecutive overs without scoring a run for the ninth and tenth wickets in a Test match against Sri Lanka on 30 July 2016. In the same match, Lakshan Sandakan took seven wickets for 107 runs and recorded the best figures by a slow left-arm wrist-spin bowler on Test debut.
- On 6 September 2016, Australia's Glenn Maxwell score 145 runs, then the second highest individual score in T20Is. Australia scored 263 runs while batting first against Sri Lanka, which was the highest team score in T20Is at the time.
- On 6 September 2019 Lasith Malinga took four wickets in four balls in a T20I against New Zealand, the first such occurrence in T20Is. He also took his 100th wicket in T20Is in the same match, becoming the first cricketer to take 100 wickets in all three formats.
- On 9 February 2024, Pathum Nissanka made an unbeaten 210 runs, becoming the first Sri Lankan to score a double hundred in ODIs.

== Statistics and records ==
As of 19 August 2024

Match statistics
Format	Played	Won by			Drawn/ No result/ Tied	First match	Last match
Format	Played	Sri Lanka	Visitors	Neutral team	Drawn/ No result/ Tied	First match	Last match
Test matches	9	2	3	–	4	1–5 December 2010	29 April–3 May 2021
One-Day Internationals	39	19	15	3 (Note: ODIs of the ICC Cricket World Cup 2011 and Asia Cup 2023)	2	8 March 2011	14 February 2024
Twenty20 Internationals	26	9	8	5 (Note: T20Is of the ICC World Twenty20 2012)	4	6 August 2011	30 July 2024
Women's One-Day Internationals	3	–	3	–	–	1 July 2022	7 July 2022

Source: ESPNcricinfo – Pallekele International Cricket Stadium

== 2011 Cricket World Cup ==
The following 2011 Cricket World Cup matches were played in Pallekele International Cricket Stadium. The first official international match was between Pakistan and New Zealand on 8 March 2011. A total of three matches were played at the venue during the 2011 World Cup.

8 March 2011 (D/N)
Scorecard

Pakistan; 192/10 (41.4 overs)	v	New Zealand; 302/7 (50 overs)
Abdul Razzaq 62 (74); Tim Southee 3/25 (8 overs)		Ross Taylor 131* (124); Umar Gul 3/32 (10 overs)

New Zealand won by 110 runs
Pallekele International Cricket Stadium, Kandy, Sri Lanka
Umpires: Daryl Harper and Nigel Llong
Player of the match: Ross Taylor (NZ)

- New Zealand won the toss and elected to bat first.

10 March 2011 (D/N)
Scorecard

Sri Lanka; 327/6 (50 overs)	v	Zimbabwe; 188/10 (39 overs)
Tillakaratne Dilshan 144 (131); Chris Mpofu 4/62 (7 overs)		Brendan Taylor 80 (72); Tillakaratne Dilshan 4/4 (3 overs)

Sri Lanka won by 139 runs
Pallekele International Cricket Stadium, Kandy, Sri Lanka
Umpires: Marais Erasmus and Nigel Llong
Player of the match: Tillakaratne Dilshan (Sri)

- Zimbabwe won the toss and elected to ball first.

14 March 2011 (D/N)
Scorecard

Zimbabwe; 151/10 (39.4 overs)	v	Pakistan; 164/3 (34.1 /38 overs)
Craig Ervine 52 (82); Umar Gul 3/36 (7.4 overs)		Asad Shafiq * 78 (97); Ray Price 2/21 (8 overs)

Pakistan won by 7 wickets (D/L).
Pallekele International Cricket Stadium, Kandy, Sri Lanka
Umpires: Tony Hill and Nigel Llong
Player of the match: Umar Gul (Pak)

- Zimbabwe won the toss and elected to bat first.

== 2012 ICC World Twenty20 ==
Sri Lanka hosted the 2012 ICC World Twenty20. Nine matches were played in Pallekele International Cricket Stadium.

Group matches

21 September 2012 (D/N)
Scorecard

New Zealand; 191/3 (20 overs)	v	Bangladesh; 132/8 (20 overs)
Brendon McCullum 123 (58); Abdur Razzaq 2/28 (4 overs)		Nasir Hossain 50 (39); Tim Southee 3/16 (4 overs)

New Zealand won by 59 runs
Pallekele International Cricket Stadium, Pallekele, Sri Lanka
Umpires: Marais Erasmus (SA) and Nigel Llong (Eng)
Player of the match: Brendon McCullum (New Zealand)

- Bangladesh won the toss and elected to field

23 September 2012 (D/N)
Scorecard

Pakistan; 177/6 (20 overs)	v	New Zealand; 164/9 (20 overs)
Nasir Jamshed 56 (35); Tim Southee 2/31 (4 overs)		Rob Nicol 33 (28); Saeed Ajmal 4/30 (4 overs)

Pakistan won by 13 runs
Pallekele International Cricket Stadium, Pallekele, Sri Lanka
Umpires: Marais Erasmus (SA) and Bruce Oxenford (Aus)
Player of the match: Nasir Jamshed (Pakistan)

- Pakistan won the toss and elected to bat

25 September 2012 (D/N)
Scorecard

Bangladesh; 175/6 (20 overs)	v	Pakistan; 178/2 (18.4 overs)
Shakib Al Hasan 84 (54); Yasir Arafat 3/25 (3 overs)		Imran Nazir 72 (36); Abul Hasan 2/33 (3 overs)

Pakistan won by 8 wickets
Pallekele International Cricket Stadium, Pallekele, Sri Lanka
Umpires: Steve Davis (Aus) and Ian Gould (Eng)
Player of the match: Imran Nazir (Pakistan)

- Bangladesh won the toss and elected to bat

Super 8s

27 September 2012 (D/N)
Scorecard

New Zealand; 174/7 (20 overs)	v	Sri Lanka; 174/6 (20 overs)
Rob Nicol 58 (30); Akila Dananjaya 2/32 (4 overs)		Tillakaratne Dilshan 76 (53); James Franklin 2/34 (4 overs)

Match tied; Sri Lanka won the Super Over
Pallekele International Cricket Stadium, Pallekele, Sri Lanka
Umpires: Aleem Dar (Pak) and Simon Taufel (Aus)
Player of the match: Tillakaratne Dilshan (SL)

- New Zealand won the toss and elected to bat

27 September 2012 (D/N)
Scorecard

West Indies; 179/5 (20 overs)	v	England; 164/4 (20 overs)
Johnson Charles 84 (56); Stuart Broad 2/26 (4 overs)		Eoin Morgan 71* (36); Ravi Rampaul 2/37 (4 overs)

West Indiess won by 15 runs
Pallekele International Cricket Stadium, Pallekele, Sri Lanka
Umpires: Asad Rauf (Pak) and Steve Davis (Aus)
Player of the match: Johnson Charles (WI)

- West Indies won the toss and elected to bat

29 September 2012 (D/N)
Scorecard

New Zealand; 148/6 (20 overs)	v	England; 149/4 (18.5 overs)
James Franklin 50 (33); Steven Finn 3/16 (4 overs)		Luke Wright 76 (43); Daniel Vettori 1/20 (4 overs)

England won by 6 wickets
Pallekele International Cricket Stadium, Pallekele, Sri Lanka
Umpires: Asad Rauf (Pak) and Simon Taufel (Aus)
Player of the match: Luke Wright (Eng)

- New Zealand won the toss and elected to bat

29 September 2012 (D/N)
Scorecard

West Indies; 129/5 (20 overs)	v	Sri Lanka; 130/1 (15.2 overs)
Marlon Samuels 50 (35); Nuwan Kulasekara 2/12 (4.0 overs)		Mahela Jayawardene 65* (49); Ravi Rampaul 1/39 (4 overs)

Sri Lanka won by 9 wickets
Pallekele International Cricket Stadium, Pallekele, Sri Lanka
Umpires: Aleem Dar (Pak) and Steve Davis (Aus)
Player of the match: Mahela Jayawardene (SL)

- West Indies won the toss and elected to bat

1 October 2012 (D/N)
Scorecard

West Indies; 139 (19.3 overs)	v	New Zealand; 139/7 (20 overs)
Chris Gayle 30 (14); Tim Southee 3/21 (4 overs)		Ross Taylor 62* (40); Sunil Narine 3/20 (4 overs)

Match Tied; West Indies won the super over
Pallekele International Cricket Stadium, Pallekele, Sri Lanka
Umpires: Aleem Dar (Pak) and Asad Rauf (Pak)
Player of the match: Sunil Narine (WI)

- New Zealand won the toss and elected to field

1 October 2012 (D/N)
Scorecard

Sri Lanka; 169/6 (20 overs)	v	England; 150/9 (20 overs)
Mahela Jayawardene 42 (38); Stuart Broad 3/32 (4 overs)		Samit Patel 67 (48); Lasith Malinga 5/31 (4 overs)

Sri Lanka won by 19 runs
Pallekele International Cricket Stadium, Pallekele, Sri Lanka
Umpires: Steve Davis (Aus) and Simon Taufel (Aus)
Player of the match: Lasith Malinga (SL)

- England won the toss and elected to field

== See also ==
- List of international cricket grounds in Sri Lanka
