= 2016–17 Premier League Tournament Tier B =

Cricket tournament

- Dates: 2 December 2016 – 29 January 2017
- Administrator: Sri Lanka Cricket
- Cricket format: First-class cricket
- Tournament format: Round-robin
- Host: Sri Lanka
- Champions: Panadura Sports Club (Note: Panadura Sports Club finished top of the table, but runners-up Sri Lanka Ports Authority Cricket Club were promoted to Tier A due to a match-fixing scandal that resulted in the match between Panadura SC and Kalutara Town Club on 23–25 January 2017 being declared null and void.)
- Participants: 9
- Matches: 36
- Most runs: Hashan Prabath (619)
- Most wickets: Gayan Sirisoma (91)

The 2016–17 Premier League Tournament Tier B was the second division of the 29th season of first-class cricket in Sri Lanka's Premier Trophy. The tournament was contested by nine teams, starting on 2 December 2016 and concluding on 29 January 2017. Sri Lanka Ports Authority Cricket Club joined the division after they were relegated from the 2015–16 Tier A tournament.

Panadura Sports Club finished top of the table, but it was runners-up Sri Lanka Ports Authority Cricket Club who secured promotion to Tier A due to a match-fixing scandal that resulted in the match between Panadura SC and Kalutara Physical Culture Club played on 23–25 January 2017 being declared null and void.

== Points table ==
Team	Pld	W	L	D	T	Pts
Panadura Sports Club	8	6	0	2	0	134.115
Sri Lanka Ports Authority Cricket Club	8	6	0	2	0	125.34
Sri Lanka Navy Sports Club	8	3	1	4	0	93.495
Lankan Cricket Club	8	3	2	3	0	88.605
Police Sports Club	8	2	3	2	1	59.755
Kalutara Town Club	8	1	3	4	0	58.945
Kalutara Physical Culture Club	8	1	3	2	1	51.46
Kurunegala Youth Cricket Club	8	1	6	1	0	49.77
Sri Lanka Air Force Sports Club	8	1	6	1	0	49.28

Promoted to Tier A

== Matches ==
=== Round 1 ===
2–4 December 2016
Scorecard

Sri Lanka Air Force Sports Club	v	Sri Lanka Ports Authority Cricket Club
172 (45.1 overs); Udayawansha Parakrama 76 (136); Yohan de Silva 3/20 (6 overs)		347 (106.4 overs); Gayan Maneeshan 72 (138); Hashan Harshana James 4/31 (16.4 overs)
172 (56.1 overs); Ranga Dissanayake 41 (47); Chanaka Komasaru 5/47 (23.1 overs)

Sri Lanka Ports Authority Cricket Club won by an innings and 3 runs
Navy Ground, Welisara
Umpires: RHSSK Perera and Vidura Prasad

- Sri Lanka Ports Authority Cricket Club won the toss and elected to field.
- Hashan Harshana James, Nimesha Mendis, Udayawansha Parakrama, Milan Rathnayake, Vishal Senanayake and Dilip Tharaka (Sri Lanka Air Force Sports Club) all made their first-class debuts.

2–3 December 2016
Scorecard

Panadura Sports Club	v	Police Sports Club
263 (59.4 overs); Mishen Silva 60 (67); Mahesh Priyadarshana 3/62 (20.4 overs)		97 (27.3 overs); Thushira Madanayake 28 (35); Gayan Sirisoma 9/38 (13.3 overs)
		151 (36.5 overs) (f/o); Asela Aluthge 74 (89); Charitha Buddhika 5/42 (9.5 overs)

Panadura Sports Club won by an innings and 15 runs
Panadura Esplanade, Panadura
Umpires: Asanga Jayasooriya and Eric Kannangara

- Police Sports Club won the toss and elected to field.
- Madhawa Nimesh, Mishen Silva, Nimesh Vimukthi (Panadura Sports Club), Tharindu Dilshan, Hasitha Lakmal de Silva and Akila Lakshan (Police Sports Club) all made their first-class debuts.

2–4 December 2016
Scorecard

Sri Lanka Navy Sports Club	v	Kurunegala Youth Cricket Club
294 (71 overs); Buddika Hasaranga 72 (86); Anurudda Rajapakse 3/42 (12 overs)		389 (112.2 overs); Dhanushka Dharmasiri 134 (204); Madura Madushanka 4/45 (16 overs)
337/5 (82 overs); Madura Madushanka 120 (202); Anurudda Rajapakse 2/21 (8 overs)

Match drawn
Welagedara Stadium, Kurunegala
Umpires: Kamal Indrajith and Nilantha Semasinghe

- Kurunegala Youth Cricket Club won the toss and elected to field.
- Duminda Dassanayake, Dhanushka Dharmasiri, Chirath Mapatuna, Chaminda Pathirana, Hashan Prabath (Kurunegala Youth Cricket Club), Ishan Abeysekara, Kusal Edussooriya, Amith Eranda, Madura Madushanka, Dinushka Malan, Ashan Ranasinghe and Sameera Sadamal (Sri Lanka Navy Sports Club) all made their first-class debuts.

2–4 December 2016
Scorecard

Kalutara Town Club	v	Kalutara Physical Culture Club
327 (95.2 overs); Tharindu Siriwardene 107 (209); Vishvashantha Weerakoon 5/94 (20.2 overs)		237 (80.3 overs); Pathum Nissanka 88 (183); Mangala Kumara 4/73 (27.3 overs)
222/3d (55 overs); Chamod Silva 93 (115); Rasika Fernando 2/77 (18 overs)		135/4 (48 overs); 64* (164); Tharindu Siriwardene 1/9 (5 overs)

Match drawn
Surrey Village Ground, Maggona
Umpires: S Dissanayake and Saman Mohan de Silva

- Kalutara Physical Culture Club won the toss and elected to field.
- Damidu Ashan, Fahad Babar, Pathum Nissanka, Anushka Perera, Milroy Silva (Kalutara Physical Culture Club), Chrishen Aponsu, Chameera Dissanayake, Nipuna Gamage, Vihanga Kalhara, Geeth Perera, Chamod Silva, Tharindu Siriwardene and Risith Upamal (Kalutara Town Club) all made their first-class debuts.

=== Round 2 ===
7–9 December 2016
Scorecard

Panadura Sports Club	v	Kalutara Town Club
353 (80.1 overs); Chamara Silva 58 (35); Mangala Kumara 4/100 (25.1 overs)		166 (61.1 overs); Mangala Kumara 41 (68); Gayan Sirisoma 7/53 (25.1 overs)
153/6 (13 overs); Nisal Randika 80 (42); Yohan de Silva 2/31 (2 overs)		342 (129 overs) (f/o); Nipuna Gamage 148* (278); Gayan Sirisoma 6/107 (51 overs)

Match drawn
Panadura Esplanade, Panadura
Umpires: Dilshan de Silva and Upul Wewage

- Panadura Sports Club won the toss and elected to bat.
- Hasitha Nirmal (Kalutara Town Club) and Mohamed Shilmi (Panadura Sports Club) both made their first-class debuts.

9–11 December 2016
Scorecard

Sri Lanka Navy Sports Club	v	Police Sports Club
376 (117.2 overs); Kusal Edussooriya 145 (250); Suwanji Madanayake 5/108 (35.2 overs)		96 (36.1 overs); Asela Aluthge 23 (50); Ashan Ranasinghe 3/20 (7 overs)
		161 (43.1 overs) (f/o); Samith Dushantha 37 (53); Ishan Abeysekara 3/67 (16.1 overs)

Sri Lanka Navy Sports Club won by an innings and 119 runs
Navy Ground, Welisara
Umpires: Maurice Dela Zilva and Mohan de Silva

- Police Sports Club won the toss and elected to field.

9–11 December 2016
Scorecard

Sri Lanka Air Force Sports Club	v	Lankan Cricket Club
230 (73 overs); Achira Eranga 59 (93); Navin Kavikara 5/63 (25 overs)		315 (86.4 overs); Rajeewa Weerasinghe 77* (102); Milan Rathnayake 4/64 (15 overs)
80 (32.5 overs); Hashan Harshana James 27 (80); Navin Kavikara 5/30 (16 overs)

Lankan Cricket Club won by an innings and 5 runs
Army Ground, Panagoda
Umpires: Palitha de Alwis and Chaminda Hathurusingha

- Lankan Cricket Club won the toss and elected to field.
- Pasindu Bimsara, Shiran Fernando, Aneeq Hassan (Lankan Cricket Club) and Suminda Lakshan (Sri Lanka Air Force Sports Club)

9–11 December 2016
Scorecard

Kurunegala Youth Cricket Club	v	Kalutara Physical Culture Club
197 (55.4 overs); Hashan Prabath 82 (138); Ramesh Selvaraj 6/63 (15.4 overs)		192 (54 overs); Pathum Nissanka 64 (69); Ruwantha Ekanayake 5/40 (14 overs)
151 (40.4 overs); Hashan Prabath 39* (87); Rasika Fernando 3/46 (13 overs)		159/5 (41.4 overs); Rasika Fernando 47* (40); Mithun Jayawickrama 3/23 (9 overs)

Kalutara Physical Culture Club won by 5 wickets
Surrey Village Ground, Maggona
Umpires: Saman Sisira Kumara and Vidura Prasad

- Kurunegala Youth Cricket Club won the toss and elected to bat.
- Thenuka Dhananjaya, Samith de Silva, Dilshan Mendis, Ramesh Selvaraj (Kalutara Physical Culture Club) and Ruwantha Ekanayake (Kurunegala Youth Cricket Club) all made their first-class debuts.

=== Round 3 ===
15–17 December 2016
Scorecard

Police Sports Club	v	Sri Lanka Ports Authority Cricket Club
103 (50 overs); Samith Dushantha 26 (67); Chanaka Komasaru 5/35 (23 overs)		223/8d (87 overs); Hashan Gunathilleke 99 (168); Kalyana Rathnapriya 4/65 (35 overs)
106 (39 overs); Heshan Perera 36* (67); Shanuka Dissanayake 5/29 (15 overs)

Sri Lanka Ports Authority Cricket Club won by an innings and 14 runs
MRIC Stadium, Hambantota
Umpires: Thilak Fernando and Kitsiri Jayaweera

- Sri Lanka Ports Authority Cricket Club won the toss and elected to field.
- Kalyana Rathnapriya and Charuka Wijelath (Police Sports Club) both made their first-class debuts.

15–16 December 2016
Scorecard

Sri Lanka Navy Sports Club	v	Sri Lanka Air Force Sports Club
316 (96.1 overs); Sameera Sadamal 59 (92); Sahan Jayawardene 4/77 (22 overs)		103 (39.4 overs); Buddika Sandaruwan 23 (84); Ashan Ranasinghe 4/18 (11 overs)
		89 (22 overs) (f/o); Lahiru Sri Lakmal 19 (26); Ashan Ranasinghe 5/31 (8 overs)

Sri Lanka Navy Sports Club won by an innings and 124 runs
Navy Ground, Welisara
Umpires: Kamal Indrajith and Saman Sisira Kumara

- Sri Lanka Navy Sports Club won the toss and elected to bat.
- Thushara Samarakoon and Yohan Soysa (Sri Lanka Navy Sports Club) both made their first-class debuts.

15–16 December 2016
Scorecard

Lankan Cricket Club	v	Panadura Sports Club
163 (34.1 overs); Chanaka Ruwansiri 40 (41); Lasith Fernando 4/29 (7.1 overs)		294 (65.3 overs); Mishen Silva 105 (100); Rajeewa Weerasinghe 6/81 (18 overs)
176 (45.2 overs); Yashan Samarasinghe 66 (131); Gayan Sirisoma 5/55 (19.2 overs)		48/1 (9.3 overs); Nisal Randika 27* (34); Navin Kavikara 1/29 (5 overs)

Panadura Sports Club won by 9 wickets
Panadura Esplanade, Panadura
Umpires: Kapila Kottahachchi and SH Sarathkumara

- Panadura Sports Club won the toss and elected to field.

16–18 December 2016
Scorecard

Kurunegala Youth Cricket Club	v	Kalutara Town Club
232 (70.2 overs); Ruwantha Ekanayake 111 (163); Tharindu Siriwardene 3/20 (5.2 overs)		414/9d (105.2 overs); Risith Upamal 130 (233); Damitha Silva 3/63 (18 overs)
213 (51 overs); Tharaka Waduge 76 (109); Geeth Perera 5/58 (12 overs)		34/2 (9 overs); Tharindu Siriwardene 17* (37); Thilina Herath 1/14 (4 overs)

Kalutara Town Club won by 8 wickets
Welagedara Stadium, Kurunegala
Umpires: Ranganath Prasanna and Upul Wewage

- Kalutara Town Club won the toss and elected to field.
- Damith Perera, Damitha Silva and Lakshan Somaweera (Kurunegala Youth Cricket Club) all made their first-class debuts.

=== Round 4 ===
21–23 December 2016
Scorecard

Kalutara Physical Culture Club	v	Sri Lanka Ports Authority Cricket Club
49 (22.2 overs); Fahad Babar 14 (27); Chanaka Komasaru 5/17 (9 overs)		400/7d (93 overs); Ishan Rangana 109 (169); Dilshan Mendis 2/70 (18 overs)
273 (87.1 overs); Pathum Nissanka 104 (178); Chanaka Komasaru 6/54 (32 overs)

Sri Lanka Ports Authority Cricket Club won by an innings and 78 runs
Army Ground, Mattegoda
Umpires: Saman Mohan de Silva and Ranjith Vishwakula

- Sri Lanka Ports Authority Cricket Club won the toss and elected to field.
- Jasdeep Singh (Kalutara Physical Culture Club) made his first-class debut.

21–23 December 2016
Scorecard

Panadura Sports Club	v	Sri Lanka Navy Sports Club
268 (54.2 overs); Chamara Silva 72 (69); Ishan Abeysekara 4/78 (17.2 overs)		125 (47.3 overs); Dinushka Malan 56 (130); Gayan Sirisoma 8/46 (22.3 overs)
288/8d (66 overs); Mishen Silva 57 (69); Madura Madushanka 3/46 (13 overs)		332 (90.1 overs); Buddika Hasaranga 76 (132); Gayan Sirisoma 5/152 (41 overs)

Panadura Sports Club won by 99 runs
Navy Ground, Welisara
Umpires: Mohan de Silva and Prageeth Rambukwella

- Panadura Sports Club won the toss and elected to bat.
- Lahiru Silva (Sri Lanka Navy Sports Club) made his first-class debut.

21–23 December 2016
Scorecard

Sri Lanka Air Force Sports Club	v	Police Sports Club
168 (76.2 overs); Buddika Sandaruwan 43 (112); Manjula Jayawardene 4/47 (19.2 overs)		184 (87.1 overs); Samith Dushantha 82 (192); Shohan Rangika 3/36 (20 overs)
142 (45.1 overs); Roscoe Thattil 56 (65); Manjula Jayawardene 7/59 (19 overs)		128/9 (53.5 overs); Tharindu Dilshan 32 (66); Shohan Rangika 5/42 (24 overs)

Police Sports Club won by 1 wicket
MRIC Stadium, Hambantota
Umpires: Kitsiri Jayaweera and Upul Wewage

- Sri Lanka Air Force Sports Club won the toss and elected to bat.
- Sujan Mayura and Sanath Ranjan (Police Sports Club) both made their first-class debuts.

21–23 December 2016
Scorecard

Lankan Cricket Club	v	Kurunegala Youth Cricket Club
422 (89.2 overs); Chanaka Ruwansiri 100 (125); Mithun Jayawickrama 3/103 (30 overs)		253 (79.1 overs); Hashan Prabath 76 (128); Chanaka Ruwansiri 4/59 (12.1 overs)
		90 (38.1 overs) (f/o); Hashan Prabath 42* (97); Rajeewa Weerasinghe 6/42 (19.1 overs)

Lankan Cricket Club won by an innings and 79 runs
Welagedara Stadium, Kurunegala
Umpires: Vidura Prasad and Nilantha Semasinghe

- Kurunegala Youth Cricket Club won the toss and elected to field.
- Kavinda Pulukkuttiarachchi (Kurunegala Youth Cricket Club), Sajith Dissanayaka and Hashan Perera (Lankan Cricket Club) all made their first-class debuts.

=== Round 5 ===
26–28 December 2016
Scorecard

Lankan Cricket Club	v	Kalutara Physical Culture Club
428 (109.3 overs); Maduranga Zoysa 127 (156); Ruchira Tharindra 3/108 (27 overs)		152 (53.5 overs); Rasika Fernando 54 (114); Navin Kavikara 6/73 (26.5 overs)
		102/5 (40.3 overs) (f/o); Damidu Ashan 49 (71); Lakshan Rodrigo 2/3 (4.3 overs)

Match drawn
Army Ground, Panagoda
Umpires: Jayantha de Silva and Upul Wewage

- Kalutara Physical Culture Club won the toss and elected to field.
- Nilan Fernando, Ruchira Tharindra (Kalutara Physical Culture Club) and Malshan Rodrigo (Lankan Cricket Club) all made their first-class debuts.

28–30 December 2016
Scorecard

Panadura Sports Club	v	Sri Lanka Air Force Sports Club
320 (76.3 overs); Nisal Randika 94 (169); Buddika Sandaruwan 4/64 (19.3 overs)		137 (34.3 overs); Ranga Dissanayake 33 (39); Gayan Sirisoma 7/56 (17 overs)
		134 (34.4 overs) (f/o); Roscoe Thattil 45 (66); Gayan Sirisoma 4/79 (14.4 overs)

Panadura Sports Club won by an innings and 49 runs
Panadura Esplanade, Panadura
Umpires: Ranganath Prasanna and Nilantha Semasinghe

- Sri Lanka Air Force Sports Club won the toss and elected to field.
- Nuwanidu Fernando (Panadura Sports Club) and Shanuka Silva (Sri Lanka Air Force Sports Club) both made their first-class debuts.

28–30 December 2016
Scorecard

Kurunegala Youth Cricket Club	v	Police Sports Club
109 (40.5 overs); Ruwantha Ekanayake 43 (97); Suwanji Madanayake 3/20 (11 overs)		148 (63.3 overs); Mahesh Priyadarshana 42 (89); Thilina Herath 8/48 (28.3 overs)
134 (37 overs); Anurudda Rajapakse 31 (29); Kalyana Rathnapriya 8/36 (13 overs)		96/3 (22.5 overs); Akila Lakshan 51 (49); Darshana Mahawatte 2/35 (6.5 overs)

Police Sports Club won by 7 wickets
FTZ Sports Complex, Katunayake
Umpires: Chaminda Hathurusingha and Kamal Indrajith

- Kurunegala Youth Cricket Club won the toss and elected to bat.
- Kalpa Bandaranayake and Malith Premathilake (Kurunegala Youth Cricket Club) both made their first-class debuts.

28–30 December 2016
Scorecard

Kalutara Town Club	v	Sri Lanka Ports Authority Cricket Club
156 (66.5 overs); Sulan Jayawardene 38 (89); Chamikara Edirisinghe 4/40 (20.5 overs)		335/7d (84 overs); Yohan de Silva 165* (225); Geeth Perera 5/109 (24 overs)
166 (55.4 overs); Yohan de Silva 53 (87); Chamikara Edirisinghe 5/34 (20.4 overs)

Sri Lanka Ports Authority Cricket Club won by an innings and 13 runs
Surrey Village Ground, Maggona
Umpires: Vidura Prasad and Ranjith Vishwakula

- Kalutara Town Club won the toss and elected to bat.
- Rusira Ravishanka (Kalutara Town Club) made his first-class debut.

=== Round 6 ===
6–8 January 2017
Scorecard

Sri Lanka Navy Sports Club	v	Kalutara Physical Culture Club
258 (66 overs); Sameera Sadamal 79 (81 overs); Ramesh Selvaraj 4/58 (12 overs)		224 (75.5 overs); Rasika Fernando 44 (85); Dilanka Auwardt 4/52 (14.5 overs)
325/7d (77.2 overs); Amith Eranda 97 (67); Ramesh Selvaraj 2/32 (12.2 overs)		165/4 (43 overs); Amal Buddika Peiris 55* (93); Ishan Abeysekara 2/48 (11 overs)

Match drawn
Navy Ground, Welisara
Umpires: Susantha Dissanayake and Thilak Fernando

- Sri Lanka Navy Sports Club won the toss and elected to bat.

6–8 January 2017
Scorecard

Panadura Sports Club	v	Sri Lanka Ports Authority Cricket Club
306 (83 overs); Hasantha Fernando 84 (99); Chamikara Edirisinghe 5/101 (29 overs)		210 (69.1 overs); Ishan Rangana 75 (144); Gayan Sirisoma 7/95 (31.1 overs)
202/9d (65 overs); Aruna Dharmasena 36* (72); Chamikara Edirisinghe 6/86 (29 overs)		172/5 (48 overs); Gayan Maneeshan 38* (79); Gayan Sirisoma 3/59 (21 overs)

Match drawn
Panadura Esplanade, Panadura
Umpires: Kamal Indrajith and Saman Mohan de Silva

- Panadura Sports Club won the toss and elected to bat.
- Kamil Mishara and Isitha Wijesundera (Panadura Sports Club) both made their first-class debuts.

6–8 January 2017
Scorecard

Lankan Cricket Club	v	Kalutara Town Club
446/9d (91 overs); Maduranga Zoysa 203 (233); Yohan de Silva 5/137 (27 overs)		289 (82.3 overs); Yohan de Silva 68 (113); Navin Kavikara 4/76 (28 overs)
24/0 (3.3 overs); Lakshan Rodrigo 13* (8)		178 (55.1 overs) (f/o); Nipuna Gamage 38 (80); Rajeewa Weerasinghe 4/60 (21.1 overs)

Lankan Cricket Club won by 10 wickets
Army Ground, Panagoda
Umpires: Maurice Dela Zilva and Suranga Perera

- Lankan Cricket Club won the toss and elected to bat.
- Suresh Peiris (Kalatura Town Club) and Fabian Fernando (Lankan Cricket Club) both made their first-class debuts.

6–8 January 2017
Scorecard

Sri Lanka Air Force Sports Club	v	Kurunegala Youth Cricket Club
200 (61.5 overs); Buddika Sandaruwan 70 (131); Thilina Herath 7/66 (20.5 overs)		307 (91.4 overs); Hashan Prabath 81* (186); Achira Eranga 3/48 (19 overs)
190 (62.1 overs); Udayawansha Parakrama 44 (130); Anurudda Rajapakse 4/21 (12.1 overs)		84/3 (17.1 overs); Tharaka Waduge 31 (29); Buddika Sandaruwan 3/29 (8.1 overs)

Kurunegala Youth Cricket Club won by 7 wickets
Welagedara Stadium, Kurunegala
Umpires: Mohan de Silva and Vidura Prasad

- Kurunegala Youth Cricket Club won the toss and elected to field.

=== Round 7 ===
14–16 January 2017
Scorecard

Sri Lanka Ports Authority Cricket Club	v	Lankan Cricket Club
248 (81.2 overs); Ishan Rangana 69 (145); Rajeewa Weerasinghe 4/87 (31.2 overs)		108 (37.3 overs); Chanaka Ruwansiri 43 (71); Chanaka Komasaru 4/16 (12.3 overs)
259/6d (65.4 overs); Yohan de Silva 90 (145); Chanaka Ruwansiri 2/65 (15 overs)		147 (30.3 overs); Lal Kumar 53 (50); Ranesh Perera 3/28 (6.3 overs)

Sri Lanka Ports Authority Cricket Club won by 252 runs
Army Ground, Mattegoda
Umpires: Mohan de Silva and Sisira Kumara Perera

- Sri Lanka Ports Authority Cricket Club won the toss and elected to bat.

14–16 January 2017
Scorecard

Kalutara Town Club	v	Sri Lanka Navy Sports Club
143 (42.4 overs); Tharindu Siriwardene 33 (54); Sudara Dakshina 4/9 (7.4 overs)		350 (85.2 overs); Dinushka Malan 113 (133); Mangala Kumara 7/98 (35.2 overs)
214 (59.4 overs); Nipuna Gamage 50 (101); Sudara Dakshina 4/67 (22 overs)		10/0 (1.3 overs); Lahiru Silva 6* (7)

Sri Lanka Navy Sports Club won by 10 wickets
Surrey Village Ground, Maggona
Umpires: Thilak Fernando and Krishantha Rodrigo

- Sri Lanka Navy Sports Club won the toss and elected to field.
- Supun Piyumal (Kalutara Town Club), Sudara Dakshina and Sathik Nimalsha (Sri Lanka Navy Sports Club) all made their first-class debuts.

14–16 January 2017
Scorecard

Police Sports Club	v	Kalutara Physical Culture Club
235 (70.1 overs); Suwanji Madanayake 96* (177); Jasdeep Singh 4/38 (21 overs)		139 (67 overs); Damidu Ashan 34 (78); Suwanji Madanayake 3/37 (18 overs)
85 (25.3 overs); Tharindu Dilshan 27 (27); Ruchira Tharindra 7/31 (13 overs)		181 (41.1 overs); Damidu Ashan 56 (76); Suwanji Madanayake 7/70 (17 overs)

Match tied
Burgher Recreation Club Ground, Colombo
Umpires: Saman Mohan de Silva and Chaminda Hathurusingha

- Kalutara Physical Culture Club won the toss and elected to field.
- Kamal Pushpakumara (Police Sports Club) made his first-class debut.

=== Round 8 ===
20–22 January 2017
Scorecard

Kalutara Town Club	v	Police Sports Club
307 (116.2 overs); Sulan Jayawardene 101 (195); Suwanji Madanayake 3/66 (24 overs)		287 (105.3 overs); Asela Aluthge 62 (130); Tharindu Siriwardene 5/55 (18.3 overs)
127/5 (45 overs); Tharindu Siriwardene 58 (91); Kalyana Rathnapriya 2/22 (13 overs)

Match drawn
MRIC Stadium Hambantota
Umpires: Kapila Kottahachchi and Ravindra Kottahachchi

- Police Sports Club won the toss and elected to field.

20–22 January 2017
Scorecard

Lankan Cricket Club	v	Sri Lanka Navy Sports Club
436 (109.2 overs); Lakshan Rodrigo 133 (113); Madura Madushanka 3/59 (22 overs)		483 (132.5 overs); Madura Madushanka 88 (175); Rajeewa Weerasinghe 5/146 (42 overs)
69/5 (14 overs); Maduranga Zoysa 20 (15); Sudara Dakshina 3/15 (5 overs)

Match drawn
Moors Sports Club Ground, Colombo
Umpires: Mohan de Silva and Krishantha Rodrigo

- Sri Lanka Navy Sports Club won the toss and elected to field.

20–22 January 2017
Scorecard

Kurunegala Youth Cricket Club	v	Sri Lanka Ports Authority Cricket Club
143 (49.3 overs); Hashan Prabath 46 (84); Chanaka Komasaru 6/50 (20 overs)		154 (59.3 overs); Gayan Maneeshan 47 (119); Thilina Herath 4/54 (28 overs)
161 (58 overs); Saranga Rajaguru 64 (107); Chanaka Komasaru 5/46 (25 overs)		151/3 (18.3 overs); Yohan de Silva 52 (35); Duminda Dassanayake 1/21 (4 overs)

Sri Lanka Ports Authority Cricket Club won by 7 wickets
Welagedara Stadium, Kurunegala
Umpires: Thilak Fernando and Chaminda Hathurusingha

- Sri Lanka Ports Authority Cricket Club won the toss and elected to field.

20–22 January 2017
Scorecard

Sri Lanka Air Force Sports Club	v	Kalutara Physical Culture Club
426/9d (79.2 overs); Roscoe Thattil 175 (190); Ruchira Tharindra 4/98 (24.2 overs)		160 (52.4 overs); Manoj Deshapriya 33 (92); Sahan Jayawardene 3/36 (13 overs)
		146 (44 overs) (f/o); Manoj Deshapriya 34 (74); Buddika Sandaruwan 4/34 (16 overs)

Sri Lanka Air Force Sports Club won by an innings and 120 runs
Surrey Village Ground, Maggona
Umpires: Kamal Indrajith and Kitsiri Jayaweera

- Kalutara Physical Culture Club won the toss and elected to field.
- Ayana Siriwardhana (Kalutara Physical Culture Club) made his first-class debut.

=== Round 9 ===
23–25 January 2017
Scorecard

Kalutara Physical Culture Club	v	Panadura Sports Club
390 (103 overs); Manoj Deshapriya 89 (120); Gayan Sirisoma 7/131 (38 overs)		423 (68.3 overs); Lasith Fernando 111 (149); Ruchira Tharindra 5/102 (15.3 overs)
197 (22.5 overs); Rasika Fernando 98 (61); Gayan Sirisoma 6/88 (11.5 overs)		167/7 (13.4 overs); Madhawa Nimesh 61 (25); Ruchira Tharindra 3/80 (6 overs)

Panadura Sports Club won by 3 wickets
Surrey Village Ground, Maggona
Umpires: Jayantha de Silva and Gamini Dissanayake

- Panadura Sports Club won the toss and elected to field.
- Ashan Fernando (Kalutara Physical Culture Club) and Nimesh Kariyawasam (Panadura Sports Club) both made their first-class debuts.
- The result of the match was later declared null and void due to a match-fixing scandal.

=== Round 10 ===
26–28 January 2017
Scorecard

Lankan Cricket Club	v	Police Sports Club
159 (64.5 overs); Maduranga Zoysa 47 (103); Asela Aluthge 4/17 (13.5 overs)		118 (47.3 overs); Samith Dushantha 46 (85); Navin Kavikara 5/41 (18.3 overs)
108/4d (28.3 overs); Aneeq Hassan 28 (69); Manjula Jayawardene 2/29 (8 overs)		45/2 (3.3 overs); Asela Aluthge 33* (13); Rajeewa Weerasinghe 1/20 (1.3 overs)

Match drawn
MRIC Stadium Hambantota
Umpires: Maurice Dela Zilva and Upul Wewage

- Police Sports Club won the toss and elected to field.
- Iwanka Sanjula (Lankan Cricket Club) and Lasan de Silva (Police Sports Club) both made their first-class debuts.

27–29 January 2017
Scorecard

Sri Lanka Ports Authority Cricket Club	v	Sri Lanka Navy Sports Club
260 (93.2 overs); Yohan de Silva 96 (185); Ishan Abeysekara 3/58 (18.2 overs)		232 (77.4 overs); Buddika Hasaranga 61 (90); Chanaka Komasaru 5/59 (22.4 overs)
148 (57 overs); Yohan de Silva 45 (78); Sudara Dakshina 4/43 (22 overs)		33/3 (5 overs); Amith Eranda 22 (21); Chaminda Bandara 3/19 (3 overs)

Match drawn
Navy Ground, Welisara
Umpires: Palitha de Alwis and Thilak Fernando

- Sri Lanka Navy Sports Club won the toss and elected to field.

27–29 January 2017
Scorecard

Panadura Sports Club	v	Kurunegala Youth Cricket Club
309 (60.3 overs); Aruna Dharmasena 90* (70); Thilina Herath 4/64 (11 overs)		131 (40.5 overs); Dhanushka Dharmasiri 44 (60); Gayan Sirisoma 7/42 (18 overs)
		147 (49 overs) (f/o); Ruwantha Ekanayake 58 (83); Gayan Sirisoma 7/24 (19 overs)

Panadura Sports Club won by an innings and 31 runs
Panadura Esplanade, Panadura
Umpires: Lyndon Hannibal and Asanga Jayasooriya

- Kurunegala Youth Cricket Club won the toss and elected to field.

27–29 January 2017
Scorecard

Kalutara Town Club	v	Sri Lanka Air Force Sports Club
147 (44.1 overs); Sulan Jayawardene 30 (63); Achira Eranga 4/56 (14.1 overs)		148 (41 overs); Roscoe Thattil 50* (85); Yohan de Silva 6/38 (12 overs)
4/1 (3.5 overs); Tharindu Siriwardene 2* (13); Achira Eranga 1/0 (2 overs)

Match drawn
Arons Cricket Club Ground, Kaluthara
Umpires: Kitsiri Jayaweera and Suranga Perera

- Sri Lanka Air Force Sports Club won the toss and elected to field.

== See also ==
- 2016–17 Premier League Tournament Tier A
