= Hashan (name) =

Hashan is a Sri Lankan given name and surname in other countries. Notable people with the name include:

== Given name ==
- Hashan Chamara (born 1995), Sri Lankan cricketer
- Hashan Dumindu (born 1995), Sri Lankan cricketer
- Hashan Gunathilleke (born 1986), Sri Lankan cricketer
- Hashan Harshana James (born 1993), Sri Lankan cricketer
- Hashan Perera (born 1991), Sri Lankan cricketer
- Hashan Prabath (born 1992), Sri Lankan cricketer
- Hashan Sandeepa (born 1998), Sri Lankan cricketer
- Hashan Tillakaratne (born 1967), Sri Lankan cricketer
- Hashan Upendra (born 1997), Sri Lankan cricketer
- Hashan Vimarshana (born 1994), Sri Lankan cricketer
- Hashan Vimukthi (born 1997), Sri Lankan cricketer

== Surname ==
- Gilbert Hashan (born 1970), Mauritian middle-distance runner and hurdler
- Saif Al Hashan (born 1990), Kuwaiti footballer

== See also ==
- Hashan Chuchg, Arizona, populated place in Arizona
