= 2018 cricket pitch fixing and betting scandal =

Alleged doctoring of the Sri Lankan pitch

The 2018 Cricket Pitch fixing scandal refers to the alleged doctoring of the pitch, a central strip of the playing field, in the home test matches of the Sri Lankan cricket team at the Galle International Stadium, as well as during the home test matches of the Indian cricket team.

== Revelation ==
A documentary produced by Al Jazeera claimed that the groundskeepers at some matches deliberately altered the nature of the pitch in order to produce results that favored the home team. The news reports claimed that two of the four-pitch fixing offenses occurred in Galle, with the groundskeepers at Chennai being accused of pitch-fixing charges after hosting the final Test Match of the series between India and England in 2016.

On 29 May 2018, the International Cricket Council (ICC) criticized Al Jazeera for failing to share conclusive evidence of pitch-fixing before broadcasting the documentary regarding the match-fixing allegations. Critics also speculated whether the Al Jazeera news network deliberately revealed false allegations, citing that Al Jazeera's findings may have been edited and modified before releasing its documentary film. However, on 26 May 2018, a shocking development revealed that the curator of Galle International Stadium, Tharanga Indika, had indeed been involved in the operation, with the discovery of camera footage linking him to the scandal. Indika subsequently admitted to doctoring the pitch to manipulate match outcomes. The match-fixing issue remains under investigation by the ICC.

The Al Jazeera news network has continuously refused to provide the pitch-fixing related evidence to the ICC stating that the lives of journalists are at risk. In July 2018, Australian cricketer Glenn Maxwell was indirectly accused by Al Jazeera's documentary as a chief suspect in the possible match-fixing allegations during the third Test match held between India and Australia which happened at Ranchi, a match where Maxwell recorded his maiden test century. Maxwell denied all of the allegations leveled against him and replied that he did not have any need to do such a thing to spoil the moment of cricket.

== Background ==
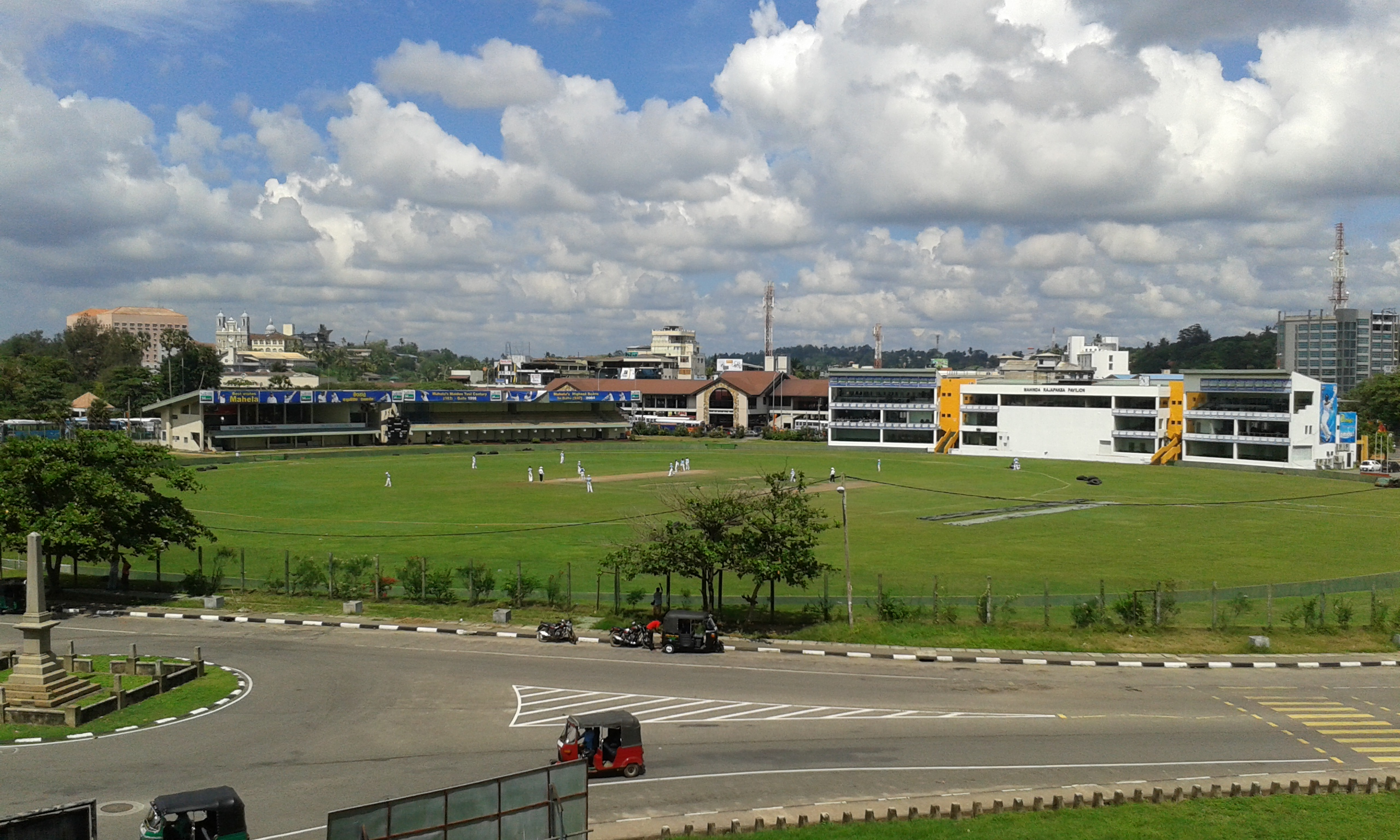
Galle International Cricket Stadium, where the pitch fixing is alleged to have occurred

The pitch tampering incident involving both India and Sri Lanka is a developing controversy in international cricket following the 2018 Australian ball-tampering scandal.

Match fixing scandals in Sri Lanka have flared up in recent times, including alleged misconduct during a domestic first class cricket match between Panadura Cricket Club and Kalutara Physical Culture Club in 2017 with Chamara Silva who was the captain of the Panadura Cricket Club and Manoj Deshapriya being caught and banned by SLC for a certain period for being named in corruption allegations. Manoj Deshapriya, the captain of the Kalutara Physical Culture Club was also found guilty of match-fixing after the unusual scoring rate by Panadura side in a first class cricket match held in January 2017.

The match-fixing probe which has raised questions about the legitimacy of test cricket results was revealed by Al Jazeera just a few days after the announcement was made by the ICC that they were scrapping the traditional method of a coin toss in Test cricket matches to determine who would bat or bowl first. With regards to the match-fixing probe, the ICC cited that the host nation had been accused and found guilty of changing the pitch conditions to suit themselves in these longer format games.

The ICC also introduced a new rule on banning the use of smart watches and other electronic appliances on the field during play and in dressing rooms. The ICC called a ban on smart watches to avoid possible match fixing by implementing the new rule with immediate effect during the test series between England and Pakistan in 2018 barring the Pakistani players from wearing the smart watches during the first test.

== Development ==
Robin Morris, a professional cricketer from Mumbai, was suspected by the ICC of playing a major role in match fixing during Sri Lanka home Test series against both Australia in 2016 and against India in 2017.

The Al Jazeera news channel allegedly discovered that the groundsman of the Galle International Stadium and Robin Morris had planned to fix the 1st test match between England and Sri Lanka held in Galle. Robin Morris told the under cover reporters that he bribed the groundsman to monitor and alter the conditions of the pitch in order to guarantee certain outcomes. Al Jazeera's documentary Cricket's Match-Fixers has identified the groundsman and Robin Morris along with another Sri Lankan, Tharindu Mendis, for planning to alter the pitch conditions. Al Jazeera also stated that it would telecast the documentary. The ICC has launched an investigation into the Al Jazeera's findings about the pitch tampering issue. The ICC has also asked for the evidence and relevant material from Al Jazeera.

Meanwhile, Al Jazeera has also claimed that two more Sri Lankans including former Sri Lankan national cricketers Jeevantha Kulatunga and Dilhara Lokuhettige were involved in a match fixing controversy during a T-20 series in the United Arab Emirates. However, in a press release on 28 May 2018, Jeevantha Kulatunga has declined the allegations made by Al Jazeera.

The Pakistani first-class cricketer, Hasan Raza, who did not take part in the conversation with Robin Morris, Tharanga Indika, and Tharindu Mendis, according to the Al Jazeera documentary, has also been identified as the suspect linked to the fixing scandal. He is seen seated near Robin Morris (who he played with during his time at the Mumbai Champs team in the Indian Cricket League) in the Al Jazeera documentary. However, Hasan Raza denied the allegations made against him and replied that his name was unnecessarily dragged into the match-fixing controversy.

The groundsman of the Galle International Stadium who is also the assistant manager of the stadium gave a statement to Al Jazeera that he can manage pitches in such a way that it would favour either batsmen or bowlers.

The Al Jazeera's Investigation Unit also revealed that Hasan Raza, Jeevantha Kulatunga, and Dilhara Lokuhettige were preparing to make money by organizing and arranging a fake tournament in the UAE solely to make a huge collection of money to fix matches in the future. Al Jazeera also claimed that another businessman from India, Aneel Munawar, who also has close connections with crime boss Dawood Ibrahim is assumed to have dealt with a few international cricketers so as to have them underperform on the international cricket level by giving them huge bribes. Al Jazeera also released photographs which were taken in Sri Lanka's Cinnamon Grand Colombo related to Aneel Munawar, who was standing just some distance away from the former English cricketers, Tim Bresnan and Graeme Swann. Both of them were part of the England's squad at the 2012 ICC World Twenty20 which was held in Sri Lanka.

It was also later identified that the former Secretary of the Galle District Cricket Association, Halambage Premasiri, who was shot dead in 2016 along with his son was also subsequently revealed to have connections regarding Galle pitch fixing. It was evident that Al Jazeera started investigations on pitch tampering incident just before the planned murder of Halambage Premasiri, which still remains a mystery.

=== West Indies v Sri Lanka 2018 ===
Considering the pitch fixing allegations probed by Al Jazeera-based mainly on Sri Lanka, apparent ball-tampering allegations were made by the match officials and umpires against the Sri Lankan team during their test series against the West Indies. Prior to the start of Day 3 of the second test match, the Sri Lankan cricket team marched protests against umpires' decision on starting the third day's play with a new ball, thereby replacing the old ball. The Sri Lankan cricket team, led by Dinesh Chandimal, refused to take the field on the third day of the test match after showing his disagreement on change of the ball, causing an hour delay to the start of the day after the apparent ball-tampering allegations made by the umpires.

Chandimal was found to be guilty of making ball tampering incidence. Video evidence indicated that on the second day's play, Chandimal was taking sweets out from his left pocket, putting them in his mouth, and applying saliva to the ball within the space of a few seconds. Two on-field umpires Ian Gould, Aleem Dar, television umpire Richard Kettleborough, and match referee Javagal Srinath observed the incidence carefully and charged him with one Test ban and two demerit points.

At the end of the match, the hearing with match referee Javagal Srinath, his team management, and other match officials took place with Chandimal and he was not able to recall what it was in his mouth when he polished the ball with saliva. As a result, match referee handed Chandimal the maximum punishment available under the ICC Code of Conduct, which was two suspension points and a fine of 100% of his match fee.

However, before finishing the match, Chandimal pleaded not guilty for the ball tampering incidence and this caused trouble at the start of Day 3 test match. The conflict started in the morning, where two umpires asked to change the ball used in the previous day with a new ball. Sri Lankan players did not accept that and refused to go into the field for the match. The incidence got worse when coach Chandika Hathurusinghe and manager Asanka Gurusinha also got involved with the match referee and umpires. Over the next two hours, several animated discussions took place between management and cricket officials.

With that, Srinath took a decision and asked Sri Lanka to take the field before 11:30 am (the scheduled start had been 9:30), or forfeit the game. Players finally agreed to play the match "under protest". The Match referee awarded West Indies five penalty runs in the match after the incident.

On 11 July 2018, ICC concluded its hearing on the trio, who had pleaded guilty to a level-three spirit of cricket offense. His hearing took place before the start of the first Test match against South Africa, and he was found guilty. He received a two-match ban, with Suranga Lakmal captaining the side in his place. On 16 July 2018, independent Judicial Commissioner handed down a further eight suspension points with maximum possible punishment for their spirit of cricket offense and suspension for four ODIs as well.

=== Postponement of 2018 Lanka Premier League ===
The scheduled inaugural edition of the Lankan Premier League which was supposed to be held in August 2018 was indefinitely postponed as a result of the change in country's cricket administration. This was also assumed to have been postponed due to Al Jazeera's claims on match fixing probe in Sri Lanka.

== Galle pitch fixing ==
The groundsman, Tharanga Indika, who is in-charge of the cricket ground was found guilty for helping the bookmakers to engage in match-fixing after allowing them to doctor the pitch conditions. The allegations were revealed by the Al Jazeera news network which filmed both the groundsman and the other match fixers on their targets of match-fixing.

Robin Morris was intended to have influenced in fixing allegations relating to Sri Lankan home matches for attempting pitch tampering by the ICC during Sri Lanka's 2nd test match against Australia in Galle and Sri Lanka's 1st test match against India in Galle. Morris was reported to have given bribes to groundsman, Tharanga Indika, who works as the groundsman at the Galle International Stadium to monitor the pitch conditions in those two home matches played by Sri Lanka against Australia in 2016 and India in 2017, and was noticed to have earned from betting after analyzing the Galle pitch conditions. However, he denied all of the allegations against him, as revealed by Al Jazeera. He later revealed that he did not place money for betting after analyzing the Galle pitch conditions in 2016 and 2017.

On 30 May 2018, the SLC said that a new pitch was formed replacing the pitch referred by Al Jazeera in its documentary film.

=== Sri Lanka v Australia 2016 ===
Robin Morris explained that the Galle pitch was prepared in favour of the bowlers of the Sri Lankan cricket team during the 2nd test against Australia in 2016 where Sri Lanka managed to win the match by a massive margin of 229 runs. Australia lost all 20 wickets within 3 days and batting 501 balls. The groundsman said that the Galle wicket for the Australian test was prepared deliberately for the bowlers by preparing the pitch poorly without using a roller. He also ensured the bookmakers that the five-day test match would finish within three days rather than end in a draw. After knowing about the pitch conditions, the match-fixers made money by betting that the match would not end in a draw. The Australian cricket team also raised concerns over the pitch conditions at the time of the test match as they felt that the pitch did not help the batters. Australian players including Steve Smith, David Warner, and Nathan Lyon complained to the match officials about the poor pitch conditions after a thrashing loss to Sri Lanka.

=== Sri Lanka v India 2017 ===
The Galle pitch for the Indian test was said to be prepared as batsmen friendly pitch where India piled up big first innings score of over 600 in the first innings, and also piled up 240 runs for the loss of only 3 wickets to demolish Sri Lanka and win the match. It was evident that Sri Lanka was restricted under 300 runs in both the innings and lost the match by 304 runs.

=== Sri Lanka v England 2018 ===
Robin Morris, along with Dubai based business person Gaurav Rajkumar, Galle groundsman Tharanga Indika, and Sri Lankan first-class cricketer Tharindu Mendis have also been investigated by the ICC for attempting another pitch tampering at Galle in Sri Lanka's first test match against England as part of the England's series against Sri Lanka in November 2018. Concerns were raised by the English Cricket Board whether to play the series against Sri Lanka over the planned pitch tampering at the Galle Cricket Stadium for the first Test match or not.

== Pitch fixing in India ==
=== India v England 2016 ===
The 5th and the final test match between England and India which was held in Chennai with India winning the match by an innings and 75 runs has been accused by Al Jazeera as the findings prove that the certain sessions of the test match may have been fixed by bookmakers. India posted a mammoth total of 759/7 with Karun Nair scoring a triple century in the 2nd innings of the match. The English cricket coach, Trevor Bayliss, denied Al Jazeera's allegations. He stated that the allegations are outrageous and he knew that such a documentary would be showcased in future. English skipper Joe Root also criticized and branded the match-fixing allegations against India in 2016 as ridiculous.

== Response ==
=== Sri Lanka Cricket ===
In a media release on 26 May 2018, Sri Lanka Cricket (SLC) announced that it would cooperate with any kind of investigation undertaken by the ICC following the allegations. The current President of the Sri Lanka Cricket, Thilanga Sumathipala, announced that independent groundsmen would, with immediate effect, be appointed in the future to supervise ground preparation. Sri Lanka Cricket suspended Tharindu Mendis and Tharanga Indika with immediate effect, and reported the case to the Criminal Investigation Department of Sri Lanka.

In a press meet, the SLC vice-president Mohan de Silva commented that he and the SLC were finding it difficult to believe any of the allegations mounted by Al Jazeera on the Galle fixing scandal.

The SLC also refuted some of the allegations made by Al Jazeera, claiming that it is not a strange thing to prepare a turning bouncy track in Galle for test matches. The SLC defended Al Jazeera's claims on preparing a spin-friendly turning pitch to favour the spin bowlers during the 2016 Galle test match between Sri Lanka and Australia where Australia lost 18 out of the 20 wickets to Sri Lankan spinners in the Galle test. The SLC also reacted negatively to the documentary's claims on pointing out the involvement of the Galle groundsman, stating that the person did not have any authoritative powers to alter the conditions of the pitch.

The SLC later revealed that the future test matches scheduled against England and South African cricket team at the Galle cricket stadium in 2018 would be shifted to other cricket grounds following the controversy. However, SLC planned not to shift the matches from Galle due to the unavailability of other cricket grounds to host test matches.

During the renovations, another problem emerged that threatened to stop the construction. One of the new buildings being constructed blocked the view of the adjacent fort, which is a UNESCO World Heritage Site. The Galle Heritage Foundation and some other organisations expressed concern over this, pointing out that this may result in the fort being removed from the UNESCO world heritage sites. This issue was later resolved and the construction re-continued after some time.

==== Postponement of SLC Elections ====
The corruption allegations revolving around the SLC Board and the breakout of the pitch fixing scandal has ultimately led a stay order against conducting the SLC Board elections, scheduled to be held on 31 May 2018. The Court of Appeal issued a stay order against holding elections for the SLC until 14 June after a petition filed by Arjuna Ranatunga's younger brother, Nishantha Ranatunga, against Thilanga Sumathipala from contesting in the elections.

Former Sri Lankan world cup winning captain, Arjuna Ranatunga, also condemned and blamed the corruption allegations linking SLC Board and the president of the Board, Thilanga Sumathipala, while criticising the ICC's anti-corruption investigation unit for not taking proper actions against corruption allegations after referring to Al Jazeera's findings on alleged spot-fixing row.

Prior to the scheduled SLC elections, the actor and politician, Ranjan Ramanayake, criticized the SLC elections as illegal and called Thilanga Sumathipala as a well known bookmaker.

=== Sri Lankan government ===
The Sri Lankan government also requested SLC to inquire into the pitch fixing probe which has damaged the reputation of the history of cricket in Sri Lanka. The newly appointed Sri Lankan sports minister, Faiszer Musthapha, said that he watched the Al Jazeera documentary and told the reporters that he wrote a letter to the SLC on addressing the issue to the CID of Sri Lanka.

=== Board of Control for Cricket in India ===
The Board of Control for Cricket in India (BCCI) stated that it would take necessary actions against Robin Morris who is accused as the main suspect of the match fixing allegations. The BCCI announced that they will take legal actions against him only if he is found guilty in the ongoing investigations conducted by the ICC on corruption charges.

=== Pakistan Cricket Board ===
The Pakistan Cricket Board (PCB) has commenced investigations on the influence of cricketer Hasan Raza over the alleged betting scandal and told that appropriate sanctions would be imposed on him if he is found guilty of being involved in corruption allegations. PCB contacted Hasan Raza and had been reviewing reports whether the disgraced cricketer took part in the spot-fixing allegations. The PCB banned Hasan Raza to take part in the 2018–19 Quaid-e-Azam Trophy.

=== Cricket Australia ===
Following the release of Al Jazeera's documentary, the CEO of the Cricket Australia, James Sutherland stated that he is not aware of any credible evidence linking the Australian cricket players in connection to the suspected match-fixing allegations in the fourth and the final test match between India and Australia in 2016.

The interim Australian test captain, Tim Paine, uttered that he is confident of the current situation of the Australian cricket team and responded that none of the Australian players would have been involved in such a match-fixing controversy after suffering from a major Australian ball-tampering scandal in March 2018.

Despite Cricket Australia denying any wrongdoing by its team, Australian all-rounder Glenn Maxwell was reported by Al Jazeera to have been possibly involved in a match-fixing affair without mentioning his name directly in its documentary film. These accusations were, however, refused by the cricketer himself, and both Cricket Australia and Maxwell went on to say that it was just an act to target him unnecessarily and an attempt to spoil his moment after scoring his first test century against India in the Ranchi test, a match which was suspected by Al Jazeera in its documentary.

=== England and Wales Cricket Board ===
The England and Wales Cricket Board (ECB) denied the match-fixing allegations reported by Al Jazeera during the final test match of England's test tour in India which was held in Chennai. Former English captain, Michael Atherton, claimed that the allegations made by Al-Jazeera regarding the Australian and English cricketers are ridiculous.

== See also ==
- Betting controversies in cricket
- Al Jazeera controversies and criticism
