= List of Kurunegala Youth Cricket Club players =

List of first-class cricketers by club

This is an incomplete list in alphabetical order of cricketers who have played for Kurunegala Youth Cricket Club in top-class (Note: Top-class matches are first-class, List A, and Twenty20.) matches since the club initially achieved first-class status in 1991.

== Key ==
- † preceding a player's name means that the original article is now a redirect to this list.

== A ==
- Nuwan Amarakoon (1998/99)

== I ==
- H. B. Ilangaratne (2006/07)

== T ==
- Tharaka Waduge (2006/07 to 2016/17) : W. W. P. Taraka
- M. I. Thahir (2000/01)
- P. A. Theekshana (2019/20)
- W. C. R. Tissera (2006/07 to 2012/13)
- S. Tyron (2017/18 to 2020/21)

== U ==
- Eric Upashantha (1991/92) : K. E. A. Upashantha

== V ==
- B. C. Vijayabandara (2017/18 to 2018/19)

== W ==
- G. A. Waligamage (2020–21 to 2022)
- W. K. T. Wanniarachchi (2017–18 to 2022–23)
- A. Wanninayake (2021–22 to 2022–23)
- J. P. Weerabaddana (1999–2000 to 2000–01)
- T. A. Weerappuli (2005–06)
- M. Weerasinghe (2022)
- Asela Wewalwala (1999–2000 to 2005–06) : A. S. Wewalwala
- H. A. Wickramasekara (2011–12)
- M. D. Wijayathilaka (2022)
- D. D. Wijayawickrama (2011–12)
- S. P. T. Wijerathna (2022 to 2022–23)
- C. M. K. K. Wijeratne (2013–14 to 2017–18)
- T. Wijesinghe (1998–99)
- Tharinda Wijesinghe (2017–18 to 2022–23) : W. A. D. T. Wijesinghe
- R. U. A. Wijesiri (2012–13)
- S. A. M. Witharanage (2006–07)
