= Ramesh Selvaraj =

Sri Lankan cricketer (born 1982)

Personal information
- Full name: Ramesh Selvaraj
- Born: 13 December 1982 (age 43); Horana, Sri Lanka
- Batting: Right-handed
- Bowling: Right-arm fast-medium
- Source: Cricinfo, 27 July 2020

Ramesh Selvaraj (born 13 December 1982) is a Sri Lankan cricketer. He made his first-class debut on 9 December 2016, for Kalutara Physical Culture Club in Tier B of the 2016–17 Premier League Tournament. He made his Twenty20 debut on 4 January 2020, for Kalutara Town Club in the 2019–20 SLC Twenty20 Tournament.
