= Madanayake =

Madanayake is a surname. Notable people with the surname include:

- Suwanji Madanayake (born 1972), Sri Lankan cricketer
- Thushira Madanayake (born 1981), Sri Lankan cricketer
