= Buddika =

Buddika is both a given name and a surname. Notable people with the name include:

- Buddika Hasaranga (born 1985), Sri Lankan cricketer
- Buddika Janith (born 1989), Sri Lankan cricketer
- Buddika Madushan (born 1990), Sri Lankan cricketer
- Buddika Madushanka (born 1992), Sri Lankan cricketer
- Buddika Prasad (born 1988), Sri Lankan cricketer
- Buddika Sandaruwan (born 1989), Sri Lankan cricketer
- Buddika Sanjeewa (born 1987), Sri Lankan cricketer
- Primal Buddika (born 1979), Sri Lankan cricketer
- Rumesh Buddika (born 1990), Sri Lankan cricketer
- Amal Buddika Peiris (born 1983), Sri Lankan cricketer
