= Samith =

Samith is a given name. Notable people with the name include:

- Samith de Silva (born 1989), Sri Lankan cricketer
- Samith Dushantha (born 1984), Sri Lankan cricketer
- Samith Tillakaratne (born 1978), Sri Lankan cricketer
