= Chrishen Aponsu =

Sri Lankan cricketer (born 1994)

Personal information
- Full name: Malimige Chrishen Dilran Aponsu
- Born: 26 December 1994 (age 31); Colombo, Sri Lanka

Domestic team information
- Years: Team
- 2016–2019: Kalutara Town Club
- 2017: Polonnaruwa District
- 2019–2020: Kandy Customs
- First-class debut: 2 December 2016 Kalutara Town Club v Kalutara Physical Culture Club
- Last First-class: 21 March 2019 Kalutara Town Club v Kurunegala Youth
- List A debut: 21 March 2017 Polonnaruwa District v Anuradhapura District
- Last List A: 23 December 2019 Kandy Customs v Galle Cricket Club

Career statistics
Competition	FC	LA	T20
Matches	10	11	8
Runs scored	222	193	49
Batting average	13.05	17.54	6.12
100s/50s	0/0	0/0	0/0
Top score	34	47	17
Catches/stumpings	12/1	2/3	4/3
- Source: ESPNcricinfo, 12 June 2020

Chrishen Aponsu (born 26 December 1994) is a Sri Lankan cricketer. He made his List A debut for Polonnaruwa District in the 2016–17 Districts One Day Tournament on 21 March 2017. He made his Twenty20 debut for Kalutara Town Club in the 2017–18 SLC Twenty20 Tournament on 1 March 2018.
