= Ashan Fernando =

Sri Lankan cricketer (born 1982)

Personal information
- Born: 18 October 1982 (age 44); Moratuwa, Sri Lanka
- Source: Cricinfo, 27 July 2020

Ashan Fernando (born 18 October 1982) is a Sri Lankan cricketer. He made his first-class debut for Kalutara Physical Culture Club in Tier B of the 2016–17 Premier League Tournament on 23 January 2017. He made his List A debut for Hambantota District in the 2016–17 Districts One Day Tournament on 17 March 2017.
