= Lasith =

Lasith is a given name. Notable people with the name include:

- Lasith Abeyratne (born 1993), Sri Lankan cricketer
- Lasith Croospulle (born 1998), Sri Lankan cricketer
- Lasith Embuldeniya (born 1996), Sri Lankan cricketer
- Lasith Fernando (born 1983), Sri Lankan cricketer
- Lasith Lakshan (born 1996), Sri Lankan cricketer
- Lasith Malinga (born 1983), Sri Lankan cricketer
