= Thattil =

Thattil is a surname. Notable people with the surname include:

- Maria Thattil (born 1992 or 1993), Australian podcaster
- Raphael Thattil (born 1956), Indian prelate
- Roscoe Thattil (born 1992), Sri Lankan cricketer
