= Dilshan Mendis =

Sri Lankan cricketer (born 1984)

Personal information
- Born: 20 September 1984 (age 42)
- Source: Cricinfo, 30 July 2020

Dilshan Mendis (born 20 September 1984) is a Sri Lankan cricketer. He made his first-class debut for Kalutara Physical Culture Club in Tier B of the 2016–17 Premier League Tournament on 9 December 2016.
