= Thenuka =

Thenuka is a given name. Notable people with the name include:

- Thenuka Dhananjaya (born 1994), Sri Lankan cricketer
- Amith Thenuka Vidanagamage, Sri Lankan politician
