= Nimesh Kariyawasam =

Sri Lankan cricketer (born 1994)

Personal information
- Full name: Kariyawasam Maddumage Nimesh Bhagya
- Born: 8 February 1994 (age 32); Galle, Sri Lanka
- Batting: Right-handed
- Bowling: Right-arm medium-fast
- Source: Cricinfo, 27 July 2020

Nimesh Kariyawasam (born 8 February 1994) is a Sri Lankan cricketer. He made his List A debut for Galle Cricket Club in Tier B of the 2015–16 Premier Limited Overs Tournament on 28 November 2015. He made his first-class debut for Panadura Sports Club in Tier B of the 2016–17 Premier League Tournament on 23 January 2017.
