= Kavinda Pulukkuttiarachchi =

Sri Lankan cricketer (born 1995)

Personal information
- Born: 21 February 1995 (age 31); Kandy, Sri Lanka
- Batting: Right-handed
- Bowling: Right-arm medium fast
- Source: Cricinfo, 29 July 2020

Kavinda Pulukkuttiarachchi (born 21 February 1995) is a Sri Lankan first-class cricketer. He made his first-class debut for Kurunegala Youth Cricket Club in Tier B of the 2016–17 Premier League Tournament on 21 December 2016.
