= Shanuka =

Shanuka is a given name. Notable people with the name include:

- Shanuka Dissanayake (born 1977), Sri Lankan cricketer
- Shanuka Dulaj (born 1995), Sri Lankan cricketer
- Shanuka Silva (born 1997), Sri Lankan cricketer
