= Trevin =

Trevin is both a given name and surname. Notable people with the name include:

- Trevin Bastiampillai (born 1985), Canadian cricketer
- Trevin Caesar (born 1989), Trinidad and Tobago footballer
- Trevin Mathew (born 1978), Sri Lankan cricketer
- Trevin Parks (born 1991), American basketball player
- Trevin Wade (born 1989), American football player
- Trevin Wallace (born 2003), American football player
- Antonio Trevín (1956–2025), Spanish politician
