= Vishal Senanayake =

Sri Lankan cricketer (born 1996)

Personal information
- Full name: Kurukulasooriya Ondachchi Mahapatabadhirallage Vishal Dilshan Senanayake
- Born: 14 February 1996 (age 30); Moratuwa, Sri Lanka
- Batting: Left-handed
- Bowling: Right-arm medium-fast
- Source: Cricinfo, 29 July 2020

Vishal Senanayake (born 14 February 1996) is a Sri Lankan cricketer. He made his first-class debut for Sri Lanka Air Force Sports Club in Tier B of the 2016–17 Premier League Tournament on 2 December 2016.
