= Chirath Mapatuna =

Sri Lankan cricketer (born 1993)

Personal information
- Born: 27 August 1993 (age 33); Kurunegala, Sri Lanka
- Bowling: Slow left arm orthodox
- Source: Cricinfo, 29 July 2020

Chirath Mapatuna (born 27 August 1993) is a Sri Lankan first-class cricketer. He made his first-class debut for Kurunegala Youth Cricket Club in Tier B of the 2016–17 Premier League Tournament on 2 December 2016.
