= Dushantha =

Dushantha is a given name and surname. Notable people with the name include:

- Dushantha Lakshman Rodrigo (born 1968), Sri Lankan Christian clergy
- Samith Dushantha (born 1984), Sri Lankan cricketer
