= Waduge =

Waduge is a surname. Notable people with the surname include:

- Laksiri Waduge (born 1965), Sri Lankan army general
- Pabasara Waduge (born 1993), Sri Lankan cricketer
- Tharaka Waduge (born 1986), Sri Lankan cricketer
