= Somaweera =

Somaweera is both a given name and a surname. Notable people with the name include:

- Somaweera Chandrasiri (1909–1971), Sinhalese poet and Ceylonese politician
- Somaweera Senanayake (1944–2018), Sri Lankan teledrama and script writer
- Lakshan Somaweera (born 1996), Sri Lankan cricketer
