= Pasindu =

Pasindu is a given name. Notable people with the name include:

- Pasindu Bimsara (born 1996), Sri Lankan cricketer
- Pasindu Dilshan (born 1996), Sri Lankan cricketer
- Pasindu Isira, Sri Lankan cricketer
- Pasindu Lakshanka (born 1996), Sri Lankan cricketer
- Pasindu Madushan (born 1992), Sri Lankan cricketer
- Pasindu Sooriyabandara (born 1999), Sri Lankan cricketer
- Pasindu Ushettige (born 1999), Sri Lankan cricketer
