= Malshan Rodrigo =

Sri Lankan cricketer (born 1997)

Personal information
- Born: 3 January 1997 (age 29); Polonnaruwa
- Batting: Right-handed
- Bowling: Slow left-arm
- Role: All rounder

Domestic team information
- Years: Team
- Lankan Cricket Club
- Source: Cricinfo, 30 July 2020

Malshan Rodrigo (born 3 January 1997) is a Sri Lankan cricketer. He made his first-class debut for Lankan Cricket Club in Tier B of the 2016–17 Premier League Tournament on 26 December 2016 & He debuted Sri Lanka indoor cricket team in 2018.
