= Yohan Soysa =

Sri Lankan cricketer (born 1994)

Personal information
- Full name: Ramasundara Hettige Yohan Nirmal Soysa
- Born: 28 November 1994 (age 31); Colombo, Sri Lanka
- Batting: Right-handed
- Bowling: Slow left arm orthodox
- Source: ESPNcricinfo, 30 July 2020

Yohan Soysa (born 28 November 1994) is a Sri Lankan cricketer. He made his first-class debut for Lankan Cricket Club in Tier B of the 2016–17 Premier League Tournament on 15 December 2016.
