= Aneeq =

Aneeq or Aneeqa is a given name. Notable people with the name include:

- Aneeq Hassan (born 1991), English-born cricketer
- Aneeqa Mehdi, Pakistani politician
