= Vishvashantha Weerakoon =

Sri Lankan cricketer (born 1987)

Personal information
- Full name: Weerakoon Mudiyanselage Vishvashantha Weerakoon
- Born: 21 July 1987 (age 39); Panadura, Sri Lanka
- Batting: Left-handed
- Bowling: Left-arm fast-medium
- Source: ESPNcricinfo, 30 July 2020

Vishvashantha Weerakoon (born 21 July 1987) is a Sri Lankan cricketer. He made his List A debut for Sri Lanka Army Sports Club in the 2007–08 Premier Limited Overs Tournament on 25 November 2007. He made his first-class debut for Sri Lanka Army Sports Club in the 2008–09 Premier Trophy on 30 January 2009. Seven years after his last first-class match for Sri Lanka Army Sports Club, Weerakoon played a single first-class match in Tier B of the 2016–17 Premier League Tournament on 2 December 2016 for Kalutara Physical Culture Centre.
