= Dinesh Seneviratne =

Sri Lankan cricketer (born 1978)

Personal information
- Full name: Dinesh Seneviratne
- Born: 9 March 1978 (age 48); Panadura
- Batting: Left-handed
- Bowling: Slow left arm orthodox
- Source: Cricinfo, 16 July 2020

Dinesh Seneviratne (born 9 March 1978) is a Sri Lankan cricketer. He made his first-class debut in the 1997–98 season. He made his Twenty20 debut on 9 October 2005, for Lankan Cricket Club in the 2005–06 SLC Twenty20 Tournament. He made his List A debut on 1 November 2005, for Lankan Cricket Club in the 2005–06 Premier Limited Overs Tournament.
