= Damitha =

Damitha is a given name. Notable people with the name include:

- Damitha Abeyratne (born 1975), Sri Lankan actress
- Damitha Hunukumbura (born 1977), Sri Lankan cricketer
- Damitha Saluwadana (1948–2015), Sri Lankan actress
- Damitha Silva (born 1998), Sri Lankan cricketer
