= Sahan Jayawardene =

Sri Lankan cricketer (born 1990)

Sahan Jayawardene (full name Mathsahan Liyanajayawardene; born 25 July 1990) is a Sri Lankan cricketer. He is a left-handed batsman and left-arm medium-fast bowler who plays for Sri Lanka Air Force Sports Club. He was born in Mahamodara.

Jayawardene, who made his cricketing debut for the Under-23s team in 2009, in both the two-day and one-day forms of the game, made his List A debut for the side during the 2009-10 Premier Limited Overs Tournament season, against Panadura Sports Club. He scored 2 runs with the bat, and conceded 22 runs from eight overs with the ball.
