= Vishen Halambage =

Sri Lankan cricketer

Personal information
- Full name: Vishen Sasmith Halambage
- Born: 19 January 2005 (age 21)
- Batting: Right-handed
- Bowling: Right-arm leg-break

Domestic team information
- Years: Team
- 2023–present: Panadura Sports Club
- 2026: Paarl Royals

Career statistics
Competition	List A	Twenty20
Matches	17	25
Runs scored	294	618
Batting average	19.60	24.72
100s/50s	0/1	0/4
Top score	67	83
Balls bowled	219	174
Wickets	2	11
Bowling average	116.50	17.27
5 wickets in innings	0	0
10 wickets in match	0	0
Best bowling	2/8	4/13
Catches/stumpings	3/–	2/–
- Source: Cricinfo, 26 March 2026

Vishen Sasmith Halambage (born 19 January 2005) is a Sri Lankan cricketer. He plays age-group cricket representing Sri Lanka national under-19 cricket team.

== Biography ==
He hails from Ambalangoda. He initially pursued his education at the Stafford International and later switched to St. Peter's College, Colombo with the intention of furthering his cricketing ambitions. His father Kumara Halambage also played first-class cricket for Singha Sports Club and his uncle Halambage Premasiri served as the president of the Galle District Cricket Association.

== Career ==
He made his T20 debut playing for Panadura Sports Club against Nondescripts Cricket Club on 27 May 2023 during the 2023 Major Clubs T20 Tournament. He was named in the Sri Lankan squad for the 2023 ACC Under-19 Asia Cup which was held in the United Arab Emirates. He made his List A debut playing for Panadura Sports Club against Bloomfield Cricket and Athletic Club on 21 December 2023 at the 2023 Major Clubs Limited Over Tournament.
