= Duminda Dassanayake =

Sri Lankan cricketer (born 1988)

Personal information
- Full name: Himihami Mudiyanselage Duminda Rukmal Dassanayake
- Born: 22 April 1988 (age 38); Kurunegala, Sri Lanka
- Batting: Right-handed
- Bowling: Slow left arm orthodox
- Source: Cricinfo, 29 July 2020

Duminda Dassanayake (born 22 April 1988) is a Sri Lankan first-class cricketer. He made his first-class debut for Kurunegala Youth Cricket Club in Tier B of the 2016–17 Premier League Tournament on 2 December 2016.
