= Thilina =

Thilina is a given name. Notable people with the name include:

- Thilina Herath (born 1987), Sri Lankan cricketer
- Thilina Kandamby (born 1982), Sri Lankan cricketer
- Thilina Suranda (born 1985), Sri Lankan footballer
- Thilina Samarakoon (born 1981), Sri Lankan politician
