= Mishen Silva =

Sri Lankan cricketer (born 1998)

Personal information
- Born: 5 June 1998 (age 28); Moratuwa, Sri Lanka
- Source: Cricinfo, 9 April 2017

Mishen Silva (born 5 June 1998) is a Sri Lankan cricketer. He made his List A debut for Kalutara District in the 2016–17 Districts One Day Tournament on 22 March 2017.

== Career ==
He made his first-class debut for Panadura Sports Club on 2 December 2016, scoring 60 against Sri Lanka Police Sports Club. Since then Silva has represented Panadura Sports Club five times, scoring his maiden first-class century against Lankan Cricket Club.

He has also represented Sri Lanka at under-19 level, scoring 60 not out against South Africa U19 at Paarl in January 2017.

He made his Twenty20 debut for Saracens Sports Club in the 2017–18 SLC Twenty20 Tournament on 24 February 2018.
