= Mangala Kumara =

Sri Lankan cricketer (born 1987)

Personal information
- Full name: Kurugala Gamage Mangala Pradeep Kumara
- Born: 12 January 1987 (age 39); Padukka, Sri Lanka
- Batting: Right-handed
- Bowling: Slow left arm orthodox
- Source: Cricinfo, 30 July 2020

Mangala Kumara (born 12 January 1987) is a Sri Lankan first-class cricketer. He made his first-class debut for Lankan Cricket Club in Tier B of the 2008–09 Premier Trophy on 14 November 2008. He made his List A debut for Lankan Cricket Club in the 2008–09 Premier Limited Overs Tournament on 19 November 2008.
