= Achira Eranga =

Sri Lankan cricketer (born 1987)

Personal information
- Full name: Walgama Kankanamge Achira Eranga
- Born: 9 June 1987 (age 39); Galle, Sri Lanka
- Batting: Right-handed
- Bowling: Right-arm off break
- Source: Cricinfo, 29 July 2020

Achira Eranga (born 9 June 1987) is a Sri Lankan first-class cricketer. He made his List A debut for Sri Lanka Army Sports Club in the 2007–08 Premier Limited Overs Tournament on 8 December 2007. He made his first-class debut for Sri Lanka Air Force Sports Club in Tier B of the 2007–08 Premier Trophy on 1 February 2008. He made his Twenty20 debut for Sri Lanka Cricket Combined XI in the 2009–10 SLC Super Provincial Twenty20 on 24 February 2010.
