= Louis Karunaratne =

Sri Lankan cricketer

Louis Karunaratne was a Sri Lankan cricketer who played for Kalutara Physical Culture Centre. He made six first-class appearances for the team, during the Saravanamuttu Trophy competition of 1991–92. He took 3–59 with the ball in the first innings in which he bowled during his career.

While he struggled with the bat early on in the campaign, he scored a first-class best of 36 in the fourth match he played, against Sinhalese Sports Club.
