= Amila Perera =

Sri Lankan cricketer (born 1979)

Personal information
- Born: 2 April 1979 (age 47); Panadura, Sri Lanka
- Batting: Left-handed
- Bowling: Slow left-arm orthodox

Career statistics
Competition	First-class	List A
Matches	88	51
Runs scored	2,893	736
Batting average	24.72	19.89
100s/50s	1/14	0/2
Top score	115*	57
Balls bowled	13,317	1,991
Wickets	259	53
Bowling average	24.31	24.26
5 wickets in innings	10	0
10 wickets in match	0	0
Best bowling	7/45	4/29
Catches/stumpings	62/–	13/–
- Source: CricketArchive, 10 October 2022

Gamage Amila Shiral Perera (born 2 April 1979) is a Sri Lankan professional cricketer who currently plays for Panadura SC. He is an aggressive left-handed middle-order batsmen and a left arm orthodox bowler. In the off-season, he is the overseas player for English club side East Molesey.
