= Lakshan Rodrigo =

Sri Lankan cricketer (born 1987)

Personal information
- Full name: Aluth Baduge Lakshan Dinuka Rodrigo
- Born: 19 May 1987 (age 39); Panadura, Sri Lanka
- Batting: Right-handed
- Bowling: Right-arm leg break
- Source: Cricinfo, 24 February 2018

Lakshan Rodrigo (born 19 May 1987) is a Sri Lankan cricketer. He made his Twenty20 debut for Lankan Cricket Club in the 2017–18 SLC Twenty20 Tournament on 24 February 2018.
