= Heshan Perera =

Sri Lankan cricketer (born 1991)

Personal information
- Full name: Mataraachchige Heshan Hanchitha Perera
- Born: 12 October 1991 (age 35); Colombo, Sri Lanka
- Batting: Left-handed
- Bowling: Right-arm leg break
- Source: ESPNcricinfo, 30 July 2020

Heshan Perera (born 12 October 1991) is a Sri Lankan cricketer. He made his first-class debut for Lankan Cricket Club in Tier B of the 2007–08 Premier Trophy on 21 March 2008.
