= Darshana Mahawatte =

Sri Lankan cricketer (born 1990)

Personal information
- Born: 20 September 1990 (age 36)
- Source: Cricinfo, 30 July 2020

Darshana Mahawatte (born 20 September 1990) is a Sri Lankan cricketer. He made his first-class debut for Kurunegala Youth Cricket Club in Tier B of the 2011–12 Premier League Tournament on 7 February 2012.
