= Madura Lakmal =

Sri Lankan cricketer (born 1985)

Personal information
- Full name: Agampodi Madura Lakmal Perera
- Born: 21 July 1985 (age 41)
- Batting: Right-handed
- Bowling: Right-arm medium fast
- Role: Bowler
- Source: Cricinfo, 19 April 2021

Madura Lakmal (born 21 July 1985) is a Sri Lankan former cricketer. He played in 84 first-class and 60 List A matches between 2003/04 and 2018/19. He made his Twenty20 debut on 17 August 2004, for Panadura Sports Club in the 2004 SLC Twenty20 Tournament. In March 2007, he was part of the Sri Lanka Cricket Academy squad that played in a triangular tournament against Pakistan and Bangladesh in Bangladesh. In 2012, he also played for Clifton Cricket Club in the Central Lancashire Cricket League in England.
