= Thenuka Dhananjaya =

Sri Lankan cricketer (born 1994)

Personal information
- Born: 4 May 1994 (age 32)
- Source: Cricinfo, 30 July 2020

Thenuka Dhananjaya (born 4 May 1994) is a Sri Lankan cricketer. He made his first-class debut for Kalutara Physical Culture Club in Tier B of the 2016–17 Premier League Tournament on 9 December 2016.
