= Rasika Fernando (cricketer) =

Sri Lankan cricketer (born 1984)

Personal information
- Born: 25 January 1984 (age 42)
- Source: Cricinfo, 26 July 2020

Rasika Fernando (born 25 January 1984) is a Sri Lankan cricketer. He made his Twenty20 debut on 17 August 2004, for Panadura Sports Club in the 2004 SLC Twenty20 Tournament. He made his first-class debut for Panadura Sports Club in the 2004–05 Premier League Tournament on 22 October 2004.
