= Pasindu Bimsara =

Sri Lankan cricketer (born 1996)

Personal information
- Born: 16 December 1996 (age 29); Galle, Sri Lanka
- Batting: Right-handed
- Source: Cricinfo, 29 July 2020

Pasindu Bimsara (born 16 December 1996) is a Sri Lankan first-class cricketer. He made his first-class debut for Lankan Cricket Club in Tier B of the 2016–17 Premier League Tournament on 9 December 2016.
