= Ranga Dissanayake =

Sri Lankan cricketer (born 1979)

Personal information
- Full name: Wickramasinghage Ranga Dinesh Dissanayake
- Born: 23 September 1979 (age 47); Kandy, Sri Lanka
- Batting: Right-handed
- Bowling: Right-arm off break
- Source: Cricinfo, 29 July 2020

Ranga Dissanayake (born 23 September 1979) is a Sri Lankan cricketer. He made his first-class debut in the 2001–01 season, his List A debut in the 2001–02 season, and later made his Twenty20 debut for Sri Lanka Air Force Sports Club in the 2015-16 AIA Premier T20 Tournament on 1 April 2015.
