= Hashan Perera =

Sri Lankan cricketer (born 1991)

Personal information
- Born: 2 November 1991 (age 35)
- Source: Cricinfo, 30 July 2020

Hashan Perera (born 2 November 1991) is a Sri Lankan cricketer. He made his first-class debut for Lankan Cricket Club in Tier B of the 2016–17 Premier League Tournament on 21 December 2016.
