= Navin Kavikara =

Sri Lankan cricketer

Personal information
- Full name: Navin Madushan Kavikara
- Born: 27 December 1989 (age 36); Colombo, Sri Lanka
- Batting: Right-handed
- Bowling: Left-arm orthodox

Domestic team information
- Years: Team
- 2008: Sri Lanka Schools XI
- 2011: Lankan Cricket Club
- 2012: Chilaw Marians Cricket Club
- 2013–2014: Badureliya Sports Club
Medal record
Men's Cricket
Representing Sri Lanka
South Asian Games
Silver medal – second place	2010 Dhaka	Team
- Source: CricketArchive, 17 February 2016

Navin Madushan Kavikara (born 27 December 1989) is a Sri Lankan cricketer who has played for several teams in Sri Lankan domestic cricket. He is a left-arm orthodox bowler.

Having played for the Sri Lanka Schools XI in the 2007–08 Inter-Provincial Twenty20, Kavikara represented the Sri Lanka under-19s at the 2008 Under-19 World Cup in Malaysia. He took eight wickets from five games, behind only Sachith Pathirana for Sri Lanka, with his best figures being 3/20 against Australia. In January 2010, Kavikara represented the Sri Lankan under-21s in the cricket tournament at the 2010 South Asian Games, winning a silver medal. He made his List A debut in December 2011, for the Lankan Cricket Club, but for the following season switched to Chilaw Marians. Kavikara switched clubs again for the 2013–14 season, transferring to Badureliya Sports Club, for whom he made his first-class debut in January 2014.
