= Manoj Deshapriya =

Sri Lankan cricketer (born 1981)

Personal information
- Born: September 7, 1981 (age 45); Colombo, Sri Lanka
- Batting: Left-handed
- Bowling: Right-arm fast-medium

Career statistics
Competition	First-class	List A
Matches	27	6
Runs scored	675	71
Batting average	16.87	11.83
100s/50s	0/4	0/0
Top score	89	31
Balls bowled	1,817	127
Wickets	27	0
Bowling average	39.88	–
5 wickets in innings	0	–
10 wickets in match	0	–
Best bowling	4/52	–
Catches/stumpings	6/–	1/–
- Source: CricInfo, 16 October 2017

Ambegoda Liyanage Don Manoj Deshapriya (born 7 September 1981) is a Sri Lankan cricketer who generally plays in First class and List A cricket matches. He has played in 27 first class cricket matches and in 6 List A matches.

== Fixing allegations ==
Manoj Deshapriya has been banned from all forms of cricket from September 2017 for two years due to the alleged misconduct during a domestic first class cricket match between Panadura Cricket Club and Kalutara Physical Culture Club along with Chamara Silva who was the captain of the Panadura Cricket Club. Manoj Deshapriya, the captain of the Kalutara Physical Culture Club was found guilty for match-fixing allegations after the unusual scoring rate by Panadura side in a first class cricket match held in January 2017.
