= Samith de Silva =

Sri Lankan cricketer (born 1989)

Personal information
- Full name: Dewa Samith Rasantha de Silva
- Born: 14 July 1989 (age 37); Balapitiya, Sri Lanka
- Batting: Right-handed
- Bowling: Right-arm off break
- Source: Cricinfo, 27 July 2020

Samith de Silva (born 14 February 1989) is a Sri Lankan cricketer. He made his first class debut on 9 December 2016, for Kalutara Physical Culture Club in Tier B of the 2016–17 Premier League Tournament. He made his List A debut on 19 March 2017, for Hambantota District in the 2016–17 Districts One Day Tournament.
