= Aneeq Hassan =

Sri Lankan cricketer (born 1991)

Personal information
- Full name: Aneeq Hassan
- Born: 22 July 1991 (age 35); Blackburn, England
- Batting: Right-handed
- Bowling: Right-arm leg break
- Source: Cricinfo, 29 July 2020

Aneeq Hassan (born 22 July 1991) is an English-born first-class cricketer. He made his first-class debut for Lankan Cricket Club in Tier B of the 2016–17 Premier League Tournament on 9 December 2016.
