= Udayawansha Parakrama =

Sri Lankan cricketer (born 1996)

Personal information
- Born: 6 March 1996 (age 30)
- Batting: Left-handed
- Role: Wicketkeeper
- Source: Cricinfo, 24 February 2018

Udayawansha Parakrama (born 6 March 1996) is a Sri Lankan cricketer. He made his Twenty20 debut for Sri Lanka Air Force Sports Club in the 2017–18 SLC Twenty20 Tournament on 24 February 2018. He made his List A debut for Tincomalee District in the 2016–17 Districts One Day Tournament on 18 March 2017.
