= Sameera Sadamal =

Sri Lankan cricketer (born 1993)

Personal information
- Born: 24 December 1993 (age 32); Sri Jayawardenepura, Sri Lanka
- Batting: Right-handed
- Bowling: Right-arm offbreak
- Source: Cricinfo, 3 April 2017

Sameera Sadamal (born 24 December 1993) is a Sri Lankan cricketer. He made his List A debut for Matale District in the 2016–17 Districts One Day Tournament on 18 March 2017. He made his Twenty20 debut for Kalutara Town Club in the 2017–18 SLC Twenty20 Tournament on 24 February 2018.
