= Geeth Perera =

Sri Lankan cricketer (born 1996)

Personal information
- Born: 2 July 1996 (age 30); Colombo, Sri Lanka
- Source: Cricinfo, 5 April 2017

Geeth Perera (born 2 July 1996) is a Sri Lankan cricketer. He made his List A debut for Polonnaruwa District in the 2016–17 Districts One Day Tournament on 21 March 2017. He made his Twenty20 debut for Kalutara Town Club in the 2017–18 SLC Twenty20 Tournament on 27 February 2018.
