= Shanuka Silva =

Sri Lankan cricketer (born 1997)

Personal information
- Full name: Koggalamaha Vidanalage Sachintha Shanuka Silva
- Born: 27 March 1997 (age 29); Sri Jayawardenapura, Sri Lanka
- Batting: Right-handed
- Bowling: Right-arm off break
- Source: ESPNcricinfo, 30 July 2020

Shanuka Silva (born 27 March 1997) is a Sri Lankan cricketer. He made his first-class debut for Sri Lanka Air Force Sports Club in Tier B of the 2016–17 Premier League Tournament on 28 December 2016.
