= Maduranga Zoysa =

Sri Lankan cricketer (born 1984)

Personal information
- Full name: Hannadige Samansiri Maduranga Zoysa
- Born: 27 September 1984 (age 41); Panadura, Sri Lanka
- Batting: Right-handed
- Bowling: Leg break
- Role: Batsman

Domestic team information
- Years: Team
- 2005—2009: Saracens SC
- 2006—2008: Singha SC
- 2008—2009, 2010—2011: Eltham Collegians Cricket Club
- 2011—2012: Burgher Recreation Club
- 2013—2015: Acton Cricket Club
- 2016—2019: Lankan Cricket Club
- 2017—2018: Coventry and North Warwickshire SC
- 2019: Bracebridge Heath Cricket Club
- 2019—present: Sri Lanka Police SC
- 2021—present: Spencer Cricket Club

Maduranga Zoysa (born 27 September 1984) is a domestic Sri Lankan right-hand batsman and leg-break bowler currently playing for Sri Lanka Police SC. He was educated at Siri Piyarathana Maha Vidyalaya, Padukka, and Lumbini College, Colombo. He has played in England for Dorking Cricket Club in the Surrey Cricket Championship. Zoysa holds a UKCC Level 2 coaching qualification and has worked as a coach alongside his playing career at English clubs.

Zoysa and teammate Krishal Magage held the world record for the highest twenty20 wicket partnership with 64* runs. In the 2019 season with Bracebridge Heath in the Lincolnshire ECB Premier League, Zoysa broke the league's individual scoring record, scoring 264 off 137 balls in the Play-Off Final and finishing the season with 1,327 runs at an average of 51.04, including five centuries. They held the title for more than four years before surrendering it to Dwayne Bravo and Jerome Taylor, who had 66 runs.
