= T. Silva =

Sri Lankan cricketer

T. Silva (first name and birthdate unknown) was a Sri Lankan cricketer who played for Kalutara Physical Culture Centre.

Silva made five first-class appearances for the team, during the Saravanamuttu Trophy competition of 1991–92. The captain of the team during the competition, Silva was an opening batsman whose debut came against Antonians. Silva's highest score of the campaign was an innings of 66, the only half-century of his first-class career.

Silva bowled just one complete over in the competition, with figures of 1–9.
