= Hashan Harshana James =

Sri Lankan cricketer (born 1993)

Personal information
- Born: 13 March 1993 (age 33)
- Batting: Right-handed
- Bowling: Right-arm off break
- Source: Cricinfo, 29 July 2020

Hashan Harshana James (born 13 March 1993) is a Sri Lankan cricketer. He made his first-class debut for Sri Lanka Air Force Sports Club in Tier B of the 2016–17 Premier League Tournament on 2 December 2016. He made his Twenty20 debut for Sri Lanka Air Force Sports Club in the 2017–18 SLC Twenty20 Tournament on 24 February 2018. He made his List A debut for Sri Lanka Air Force Sports Club in the 2017–18 Premier Limited Overs Tournament on 14 March 2018.
