= Kamal Indrajith =

Sri Lankan cricketer (born 1977)

Kamal Indrajith (born 3 February 1977) is a Sri Lankan former cricketer. He was a right-handed batsman and right-arm medium-pace bowler who played for Moors Sports Club. He was born in Colombo.

Indrajith made a single first-class appearance for the side, during the 1995–96 season, against Sinhalese Sports Club. From the tailend, he scored 1 not out in the first innings in which he batted, and 0 not out in the second. Indrajith bowled 3 overs in the match, conceding 20 runs.

He is now an umpire and stood in matches in the 2017–18 SLC Twenty20 Tournament in Sri Lanka.
