= Sulan Jayawardene =

Sri Lankan cricketer (born 1985)

Personal information
- Born: 20 October 1985 (age 41); Hambantota, Sri Lanka
- Source: Cricinfo, 17 March 2017

Sulan Jayawardene (born 20 October 1985) is a Sri Lankan cricketer. He made his first-class debut for Sri Lanka Army Sports Club in the 2008–09 Premier Trophy on 9 January 2009.
