= Madura Madushanka =

Sri Lankan cricketer (born 1994)

Personal information
- Born: 10 January 1994 (age 32)
- Batting: Right-handed
- Bowling: Right-arm offbreak
- Source: Cricinfo, 3 April 2017

Madura Madushanka (born 10 January 1994) is a Sri Lankan cricketer. He made his List A debut for Matale District in the 2016–17 Districts One Day Tournament on 18 March 2017. He made his Twenty20 debut on 22 May 2022, for Sri Lanka Navy Sports Club in the Major Clubs T20 Tournament.
