= Trevin Mathew =

Sri Lankan cricketer (born 1978)

Trevin Mathew (born 6 May 1978) was a Sri Lankan cricketer. He was a left-handed batsman and a left-arm medium-pace bowler who played for Colts Cricket Club. He was born in Colombo.

Mathew made a single first-class appearance for the side, during the 1997–98 season, against Panadura Sports Club. From the tailend, he scored a duck in the only innings in which he batted.

Mathew took figures of 3-57 from 11 overs with the ball.
