= Damitha Silva =

Sri Lankan cricketer (born 1998)

Personal information
- Full name: Basthiyan Arachchilage Damitha Naween Silva
- Born: 26 August 1998 (age 28); Kurunegala, Sri Lanka
- Batting: Left-handed
- Bowling: Slow left arm orthodox
- Source: ESPNcricinfo, 30 July 2020

Damitha Silva (born 26 August 1998) is a Sri Lankan cricketer. He made his first-class debut for Kurunegala Youth Cricket Club in Tier B of the 2016–17 Premier League Tournament on 16 December 2016. Prior to his debut, he was named in Sri Lanka's squad for the 2016 Under-19 Cricket World Cup. He made his Twenty20 debut for Tamil Union Cricket and Athletic Club in the 2018–19 SLC Twenty20 Tournament on 15 February 2019. He made his List A debut for Tamil Union Cricket and Athletic Club in the 2018–19 Premier Limited Overs Tournament on 5 March 2019.
