= Lakshan Somaweera =

Sri Lankan cricketer (born 1996)

Personal information
- Full name: Dauda Arachchilage Poornima Lakshan Somaweera
- Born: 1 May 1996 (age 30); Kurunegala, Sri Lanka
- Batting: Left-handed
- Bowling: Left-arm fast-medium
- Source: ESPNcricinfo, 27 July 2020

Lakshan Somaweera (born 1 May 1996) is a Sri Lankan cricketer. He made his first-class debut for Galle Cricket Club in Tier B of the 2016–17 Premier League Tournament Tier on 16 December 2016.
