= Hashan Chuchg, Arizona =

Populated place in Pima County, Arizona

- Populated Place
- Location within the state of Arizona Hashan Chuchg (the United States)
- Coordinates: 31°34′02″N 111°46′22″W
- Country: United States
- State: Arizona
- County: Pima
- Elevation: 2,539 ft (774 m)
- Time zone: UTC-7 (Mountain (MST))
  - Summer (DST): UTC-7 (MST)
- Area code: 520
- FIPS code: 04-31460
- GNIS feature ID: 24451

Hashan Chuchg is a populated place situated in Pima County, Arizona, close to the United States' international border with Mexico. It has an estimated elevation of 2,539 feet (774 m) above sea level.
