= Sudara Dakshina =

Sri Lankan cricketer (born 1995)

Personal information
- Full name: Helandu Gedara Sudara Dakshina
- Born: 19 June 1995 (age 31); Colombo, Sri Lanka
- Batting: Right-handed
- Bowling: Slow left arm orthodox
- Source: Cricinfo, 18 March 2018

Sudara Dakshina (born 19 June 1995) is a Sri Lankan cricketer. He made his List A debut for Sri Lanka Navy Sports Club in the 2017–18 Premier Limited Overs Tournament on 18 March 2018. He made his Twenty20 debut on 4 January 2020, for Sri Lanka Navy Sports Club in the 2019–20 SLC Twenty20 Tournament.
