= Halambage Premasiri =

Sri Lankan cricketer and businessperson

Personal information
- Born: 24 February 1962; Colombo, Western Province, Sri Lanka
- Died: 12 August 2016 (aged 54); Manimulla, Ambalangoda, Southern Province, Sri Lanka
- Batting: Right-handed
- Bowling: Right-arm off-break

Domestic team information
- Years: Team
- Ruhuna cricket team
- Bloomfield Cricket and Athletic Club
- Singha Sports Club

Career statistics
Competition	FC	LA
Matches	70	5
Runs scored	3366	161
Batting average	28.28	32.20
100s/50s	6/16	0/1
Top score	147	61
Balls bowled	85	–
Wickets	1	–
Bowling average	45.00	–
5 wickets in innings	0	–
10 wickets in match	0	n/a
Best bowling	1/21	–
Catches/stumpings	47/-	0/-
- Source: Cricinfo, 30 March 2018

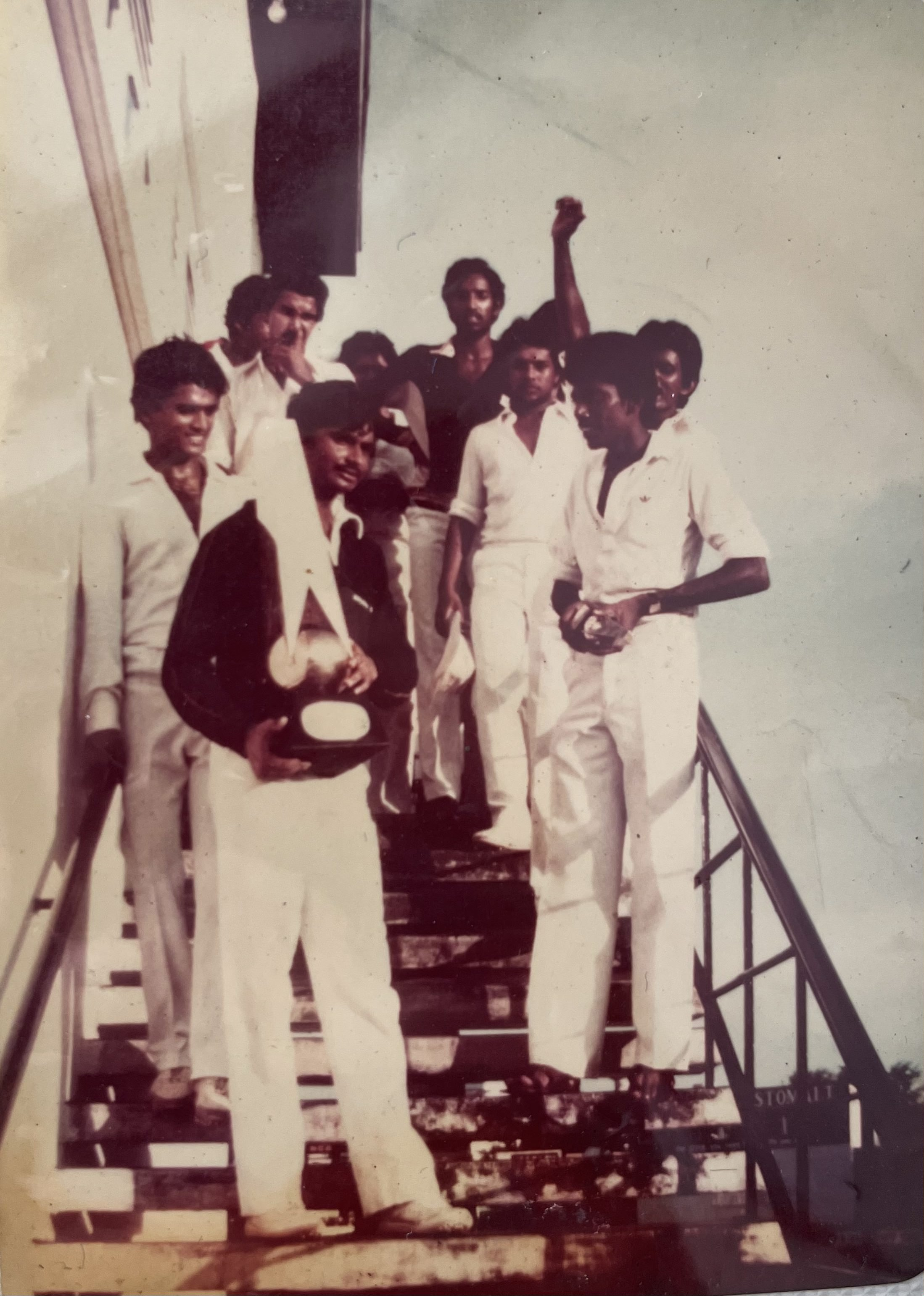
1983 Under 25 Champions Bloomfield Team H Premasiri is Behind Brendon Kuruppu on the left

Halambage Premasiri, also known as H. Premasiri (24 February 1962 – 12 August 2016) was a Sri Lankan first-class cricketer, entrepreneur and president of the Galle District Cricket Association. He was shot dead near his residence in Ambalangoda while he was the president of the Galle District Cricket Association. His murder remains unsolved.

== Biography ==
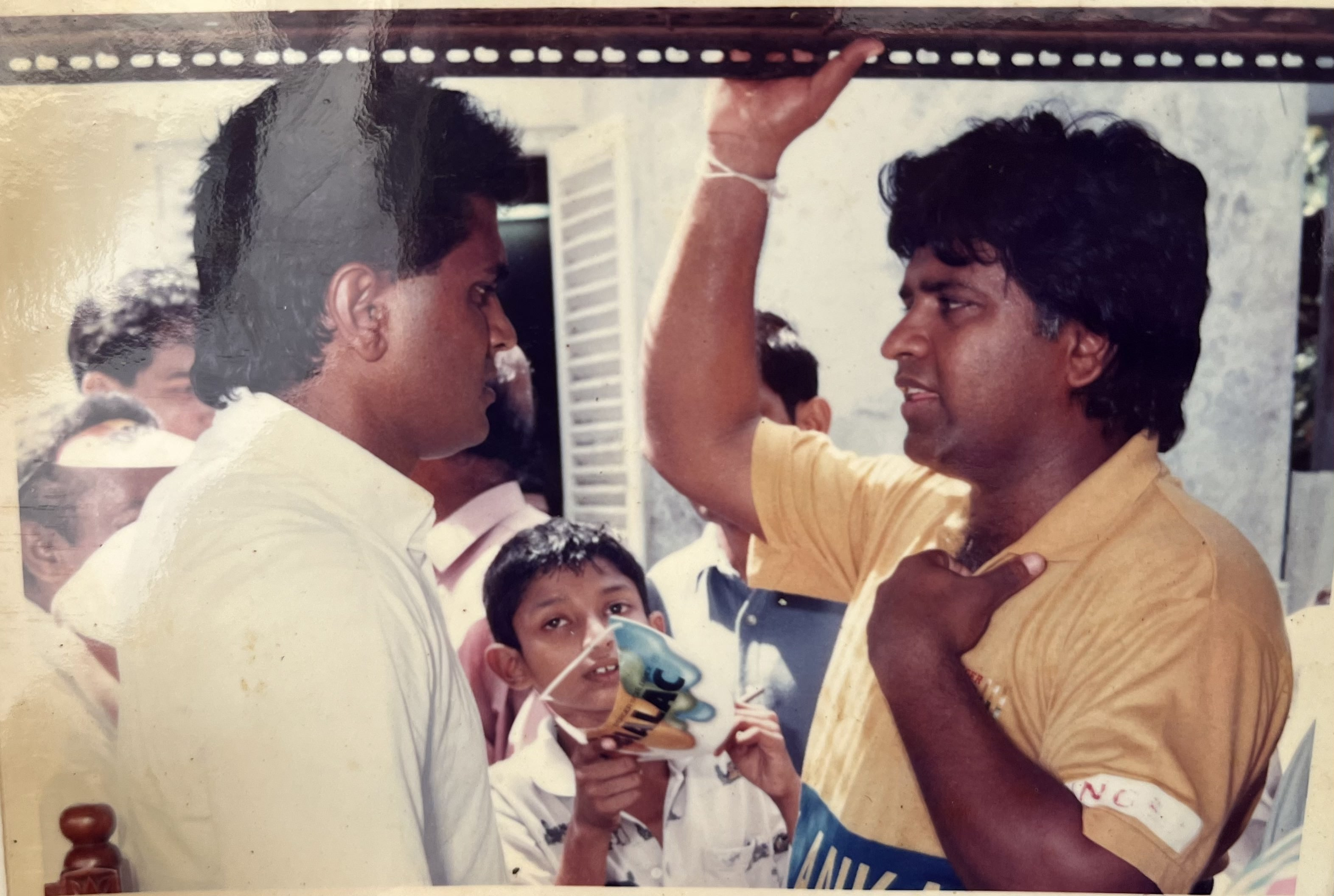
HP with Arjuna

Premasiri was born on 24 February 1962 in Ambalangoda to Mrs Weerakonda Arachchige Leelawathi and Mr Halambage Sumanadasa. He was the third child out of 3 more boys and 2 girls.

He entered to study at the Dharmasoka College in Ambalangoda in 1968 till 1981. He briefly moved to Ananda college Colombo before returning after 4 months.

== Career ==
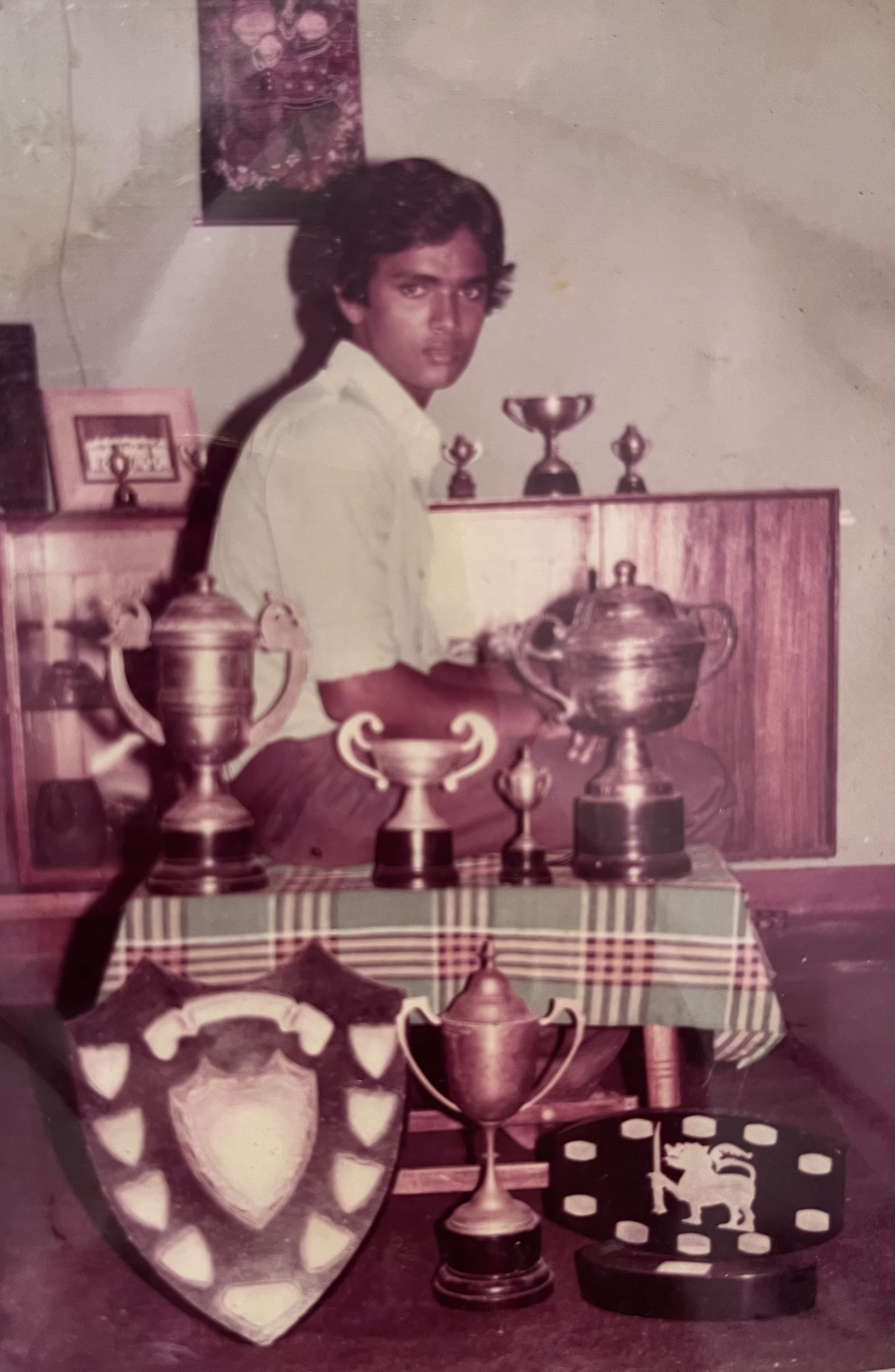
A rising star in cricket scene

Halambage played 70 first-class cricket matches and 5 List A matches for Ruhuna and Bloomfield Cricket and Athletic Club.

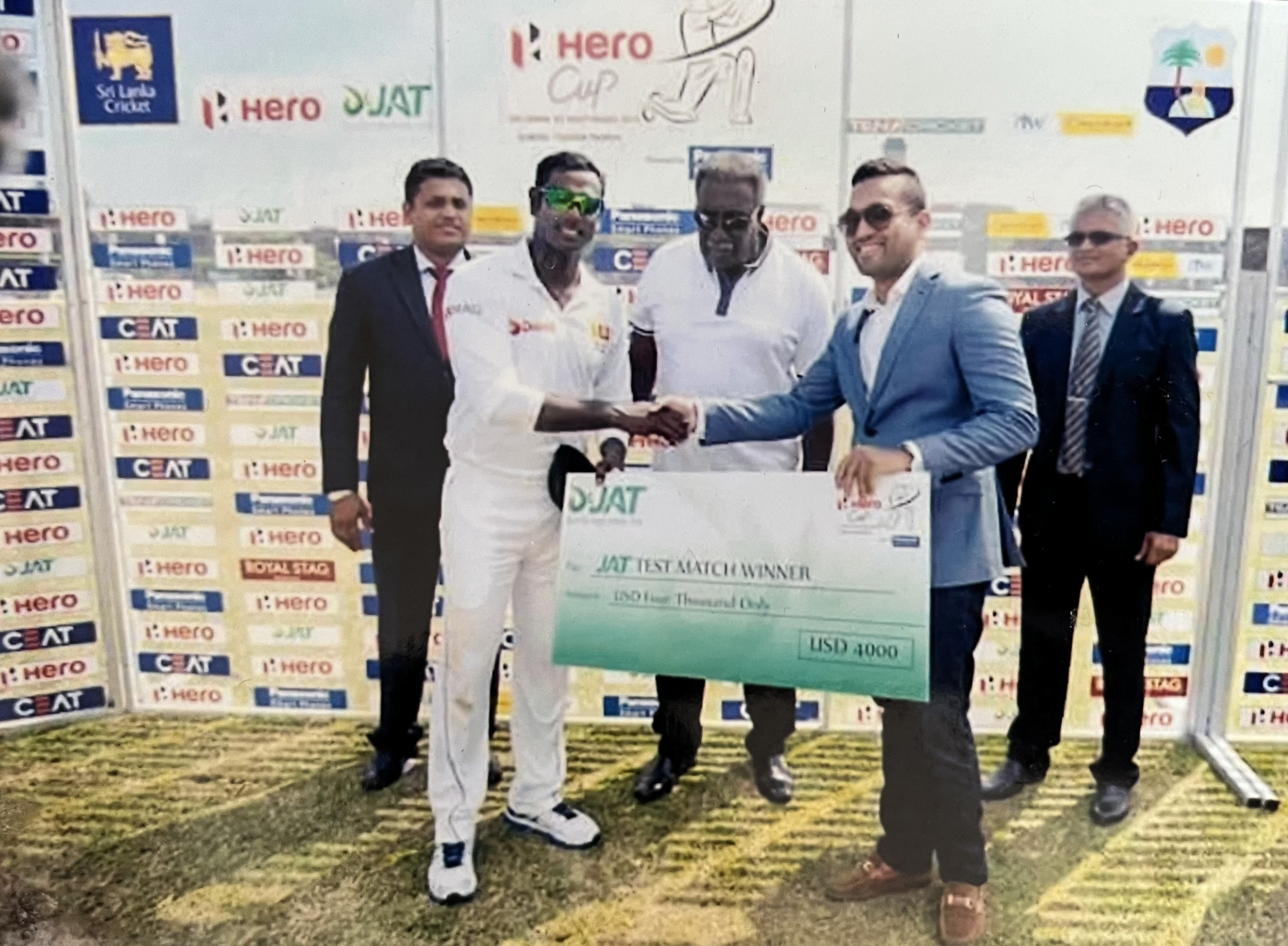
On the left to Sir Clive Lloyd is Halambage Premasiri at Galle International Cricket Ground

At age 13 he had developed a name as a talented soft ball cricketer in Ambalangoda. Because of that Mr Premasiri was introduced to Mr Charlie Jayasooriya, master in charge of school hard ball cricket by Mr Nihal Silva who is the younger brother of Test Cricketer Ajith De Silva.

After his initial success in under 14 team. He was promoted to the captain of under 16 and under 17. Furthermore because of his continuous performance he was given the chance to play first class school cricket from the age of 16.

He was the vice captain of the first class school team for Dharmasoka in 1980 and the captain in the 1981.

== Administrator ==
=== Controversial appointment ===
On 28 July 2016, Halambage Premasiri was appointed as the president of the Galle District Cricket Association after being secretary of the association for some time. The appointment came during a period of turmoil in the Association. Sri Lanka Cricket disagreed with the appointment and ordered fresh elections for 27 August 2018.

=== Standing Firm Against Pitch Fixing ===
While serving as the President of the Galle District Cricket Association he was reported to have spoken against possible probabilities of the Galle pitch fixing scandal, according to Al Jazeera.

The News First Article

......On 3 February 2016, Godfrey Dabare who is currently the Manager of the International Venues and Facilities at Sri Lanka Cricket, had issued a memo to Halambage Premasiri before the second test against Australia. The internal memo calls for 15 member team be appointed as staff for the Galle International Cricket Stadium. Among the 15 names, is Tharindu Indika who is implicated in the Al Jazeera documentary for pitch-fixing.

It was this memo that states the appointment of Tharindu Indika as Assistant Manager of the Galle International Cricket Stadium for the first time. In his response to Godfrey Dabare, Halambage says it would be unwise to make any changes in staff as the current staff and curator had well over 15 years in experience.

Halambage on 25 February 2016, calls on Godfrey Dabare to reconsider the request given the recent match-fixing allegations against Jayananda Warnaweera causing disrepute to the Galle International Cricket Stadium.

However disregarding this letter, the 15 member staff named by Godfrey Dabare was appointed through a letter signed by the CEO of Sri Lanka Cricket on 29 February.....

https://www.newsfirst.lk/2018/05/30/halambage-premasiri-homicide-and-match-fixing/

== Murder ==
On 12 August 2016, Halambage Premasiri was murdered by two individuals in a white motor car near his residence in the Manimulla area in Ambalangoda. He was shot dead by two suspects( Kande Kalasi Udaya Kumara also known as Podi Paul and another Dasun Manawadu) while he was driving home with his 12-year-old son.

Reports suggested that his controversial appointment and the legal dispute over the elections may have been factors in the murder. He was killed just after the conclusion of the 2nd Test match between Sri Lanka and Australia in Galle which was organised by the Galle Cricket Association.

== Legacy ==
ICC CENTENARY MEDAL

Mr Premasiri commitment to the development of cricket in the south of Sri Lanka is very popular. However back in 2009 it was recognised internationally.

The international Cricket Council (ICC) introduced the ICC CENTENARY MEDALS in 2009 to celebrate its centenary year. Rather than recognising high profile international cricketers these medals were specifically created to honour 1,000 dedicated, grassroot volunteers, administrators and unsung heroes worldwide who delivered exceptional off field service to the development of cricket.

The International Cricket Council distributed 50 medals to Sri Lanka Cricket to award to community servants, and Mr. Halambage Premasiri received one of these medals. He received the medal alongside other Sri Lankan cricket figures.

The full list was published on the official quarterly newsletter of Sri Lanka cricket (September 2009 issue). Mr Halambage Premasiri is 32nd recipient alongside Asantha De Mel, Aravinda De Silva, Jayantha Darmadasa, Ranjith Fernando, Nelson Mendis, Duleep Mendis, Arjuna Ranathunga, Sidath Wettimuny and more.

20th Anniversary of 96 World Cup Win

Due to Mr Halambage Premasiri's cricket prowess even at age 54 he was invited to be part of the All stars team that played against the 96 world cup team on the 20th anniversary of Sri Lanka's 1996 world cup win.

Family and Cricket

Mr Halambage Premasiri lead the charge of many number of Halambage brother,sons and nephews to follow cricket. Famously Halambage family had produced 6 first class cricket captains of Dharmasoka college.

Mr Halambage Premasiri is survived by his wife A M Deepa De Silva and his 3 sons. The youngest son Senitha Halambage continues his cricket journey and plays for NCC - A First class club in Sri Lankan cricket.

Backyard cricket practise
