= Buddika Sandaruwan =

Sri Lankan cricketer (born 1989)

Buddika Sandaruwan (full name Pethiyangaha Wattage Buddika Sandaruwan; born 11 July 1989) is a Sri Lankan cricketer. He is a right-handed batsman and leg-break bowler who plays for Sri Lanka Air Force Sports Club. He was born in Galle.

Sandaruwan made his cricketing debut for the Sri Lanka Air Force Sports Club Under-23s during the 2009 season, against Burgher Recreation Club.

He made his Twenty20 debut for Sri Lanka Air Force Sports Club in the 2017–18 SLC Twenty20 Tournament on 24 February 2018.
