= Ruchira Tharindra =

Sri Lankan cricketer (born 1992)

Personal information
- Full name: Ginthota Widanalage Ruchira Tharindra Silva
- Born: 27 May 1992 (age 34); Panadura, Sri Lanka
- Source: Cricinfo, 7 April 2017

Ruchira Tharindra (born 27 May 1992) is a Sri Lankan cricketer. He made his List A debut for Hambantota District in the 2016–17 Districts One Day Tournament on 17 March 2017.
