= Tharindu Sriwardene =

Sri Lankan cricketer (born 1984)

Personal information
- Born: 23 December 1984 (age 41); Kalutara, Sri Lanka
- Source: Cricinfo, 5 April 2017

Tharindu Sriwardene (born 23 December 1984) is a Sri Lankan cricketer. He made his List A debut for Polonnaruwa District in the 2016–17 Districts One Day Tournament on 18 March 2017.
