= Ishan Rangana =

Sri Lankan cricketer (born 1993)

Personal information
- Born: 6 June 1993 (age 33)
- Source: Cricinfo, 14 January 2018

Ishan Rangana (born 6 June 1993) is a Sri Lankan cricketer. He made his first-class debut for Sri Lanka Ports Authority Cricket Club in the 2012–13 Premier Trophy on 22 March 2013.
