= Tharindu Dilshan =

Sri Lankan cricketer (born 1992)

Personal information
- Born: 30 September 1992 (age 34); Moratuwa, Sri Lanka
- Source: Cricinfo, 4 April 2017

Tharindu Dilshan (born 30 September 1992) is a Sri Lankan cricketer. He made his List A debut for Vauniya District in the 2016–17 Districts One Day Tournament on 18 March 2017. He made his Twenty20 debut for Sri Lanka Police Sports Club in the 2017–18 SLC Twenty20 Tournament on 24 February 2018.
