= Yohan de Silva =

Sri Lankan cricketer (born 1985)

Personal information
- Full name: Kaluarachchige Yohan de Silva
- Born: 14 April 1985 (age 41); Anuradhapura, Sri Lanka
- Batting: Left-handed
- Bowling: Right-arm off break
- Source: Cricinfo, 29 July 2020

Yohan de Silva (born 14 April 1985) is a Sri Lankan first-class cricketer. He made his List A debut for Bloomfield Cricket and Athletic Club in the 2004–05 Premier Limited Overs Tournament on 21 August 2004. He made his Twenty20 debut for Bloomfield Cricket and Athletic Club on 3 September 2004. He made his first-class debut for Bloomfield Cricket and Athletic Club in the 2005–06 Premier Trophy on 29 December 2005.
