= Mithun Jayawickrama =

Sri Lankan cricketer (born 1990)

Personal information
- Born: 28 June 1990 (age 36)
- Source: Cricinfo, 30 July 2020

Mithun Jayawickrama (born 28 June 1990) is a Sri Lankan cricketer. He made his first-class debut for Badureliya Sports Club in the 2014–15 Premier League Tournament on 20 February 2015.
