= Lahiru Silva =

Sri Lankan cricketer (born 1981)

Personal information
- Born: 3 August 1981 (age 45)
- Source: Cricinfo, 8 January 2020

Lahiru Silva (born 3 August 1981) is a Sri Lankan cricketer. He made his Twenty20 debut on 8 January 2020, for Unichela Sports Club in the 2019–20 SLC Twenty20 Tournament.
