= Panadura Royal College =

Royal College, Panadura
- රාජකීය විද්‍යාලය, පානදුර
- Panadura, Kalutara District; Sri Lanka

Information
- Type: Provincial School
- Motto: Aththanan Damayanthi Panditha
- Established: 1976
- Authority: Ministry of Education
- Grades: Class 1 - 13
- Gender: Boys
- Age: 6 to 19
- Enrollment: 3,000
- Campus size: 14 ha (35 acres)
- Colours: Green and gold
- Former pupils: Old Royalists

Royal College, Panadura (also known as Royal Panadura and Panadura Royal) (Sinhala: රාජකීය විද්‍යාලය පානදුර) is a provincial school in Panadura, Sri Lanka.

== History ==
The school was inaugurated in 1978 as Janadipathy Vidyalaya and later renamed as Royal College. Current students of the school are referred to in the press as Panadura Royalists. The college conducts classes from grade 1 to 13 in both Sinhala and Tamil medium including English medium from grade six onwards. The college is spread across over 14 hectares (34 acres), and has an information technology centre, facilities of over ten scientific labs, auditoriums, a sports complex with squash courts, basketball courts and table tennis, an international standard rugby football ground and a modern gymnasium, two cricket grounds and nets, swimming pool with diving facilities, along with volleyball and tennis courts.

The school also has a cadet corps.

== Cricket ==
=== Battle of the Greens ===
Royal College, Panadura plays annual cricket Big Match with St. John's College Panadura (Royal Panadura versus St. John's Panadura). It is also called Battle of the Greens. The Big Match is played for Mervyn Joseph Cooray Shield.

== Alumni associations ==
Panadura Royal College has two main alumni associations. These alumni associations play annual cricket matches against other alumni associations such as the Old Wesleyites Sports Club and the Old Johnians Old Boys Association.

=== Notable alumni ===
Name	Year/degree	Notability	Reference
Chamara Silva		Player for the Sri Lanka national cricket team (2006–2008)	

== See also ==
- List of schools in Western Province, Sri Lanka
