= Ishan Abeysekara =

Sri Lankan cricketer (born 1993)

Personal information
- Born: 11 August 1993 (age 33); Matara, Sri Lanka
- Batting: Right-handed
- Bowling: Legbreak
- Source: Cricinfo, 3 April 2017

Ishan Abeysekara (born 11 August 1993) is a Sri Lankan cricketer. He made his List A debut for Matale District in the 2016–17 Districts One Day Tournament on 18 March 2017. He made his Twenty20 debut for Sri Lanka Navy Sports Club in the 2017–18 SLC Twenty20 Tournament on 24 February 2018.
