= Tharinda Wijesinghe =

Sri Lankan cricketer (born 1997)

Personal information
- Born: 18 December 1997 (age 28)
- Source: Cricinfo, 2 March 2018

Tharinda Wijesinghe (born 18 December 1997) is a Sri Lankan cricketer. He made his Twenty20 debut for Kurunegala Youth Cricket Club in the 2017–18 SLC Twenty20 Tournament on 1 March 2018. He made his List A debut for Kurunegala Youth Cricket Club in the 2017–18 Premier Limited Overs Tournament on 11 March 2018.
