= Yohan de Silva (Sri Lankan cricketer, born 1994) =

Sri Lankan cricketer (born 1994)

Personal information
- Full name: Aruwadura Yohan Rashmika de Silva
- Born: 10 January 1994 (age 32); Galle, Sri Lanka
- Batting: Right-handed
- Bowling: Right-arm off break
- Source: Cricinfo, 29 July 2020

Yohan de Silva (born 10 January 1994) is a Sri Lankan first-class cricketer. He made his first-class debut for Sri Lanka Ports Authority Cricket Club in the 2013–14 Premier Trophy on 13 March 2014. He made his List A debut for Sri Lanka Army Sports Club in the 2015–16 Premier Limited Overs Tournament on 28 November 2015.
