= Kalyana Rathnapriya =

Sri Lankan cricketer (born 1989)

Personal information
- Full name: Warnakulasuriya Weerakoon Arachchige Kalyana Rathnapriya Fernando
- Born: 18 February 1989 (age 37)
- Source: Cricinfo, 14 March 2018

Kalyana Rathnapriya (born 18 February 1989) is a Sri Lankan cricketer. He made his List A debut for Vauniya District in the 2016–17 Districts One Day Tournament on 18 March 2017. He made his Twenty20 debut for Police Sports Club in the 2018–19 SLC Twenty20 Tournament on 16 February 2019.
