= Hashan Gunathilleke =

Sri Lankan cricketer (born 1986)

Personal information
- Full name: Metrige Don Hashan Dananjaya Gunathilleke
- Born: 17 April 1986 (age 40); Colombo, Sri Lanka
- Batting: Right-handed
- Bowling: Right-arm off break
- Source: ESPNcricinfo, 30 July 2020

Hashan Gunathilleke (born 17 April 1986) is a Sri Lankan cricketer. He made his List A debut for Seeduwa Raddoluwa Cricket Club in the 2009–10 Premier Limited Overs Tournament on 2 September 2009. He made his first-class debut for Seeduwa Raddoluwa Cricket Club in Tier B of the 2006–07 Premier Trophy on 2 October 2009. He made his Twenty20 debut for Sri Lanka Ports Authority Cricket Club in the 2012 CSN Premier Clubs T20 Tournament on 27 March 2012.
