= Chamara Silva =

Sri Lankan cricketer (born 1979)

Personal information
- Full name: Lindamalilage Prageeth Chamara Silva
- Born: 14 December 1979 (age 46); Panadura, Sri Lanka
- Batting: Right-handed
- Bowling: Right-arm leg-spin
- Role: Batsman

International information
- National side: Sri Lanka (1999–2011)
- Test debut (cap 105): 7 December 2006 v New Zealand
- Last Test: 3 April 2008 v West Indies
- ODI debut (cap 101): 26 August 1999 v Australia
- Last ODI: 23 November 2011 v Pakistan
- T20I debut (cap 6): 22 December 2006 v New Zealand
- Last T20I: 25 November 2011 v Pakistan

Domestic team information
- Years: Team
- 2007–: Bloomfield Cricket and Athletic Club
- 2005–2007: Sebastianites Cricket and Athletic Club
- 2003–2005: Sinhalese Sports Club
- 1996–2003: Panadura Sports Club
- 2008: Deccan Chargers

Career statistics
Competition	Test	ODI	T20I
Matches	11	75	16
Runs scored	537	1,587	175
Batting average	33.56	28.85	13.46
100s/50s	1/2	1/13	0/0
Top score	152*	107*	38
Balls bowled	102	42	18
Wickets	1	1	1
Bowling average	65.00	33.00	15.00
5 wickets in innings	0	0	0
10 wickets in match	0	0	0
Best bowling	1/57	1/21	1/4
Catches/stumpings	7/–	20/–	5/–
Medal record
Men's Cricket
Representing Sri Lanka
ICC Cricket World Cup
Runner-up	2007 West-Indies
Runner-up	2011 India–Bangladesh–Sri Lanka
ICC T20 World Cup
Runner-up	2009 England
- Source: ESPNcricinfo, 9 February 2017

Lindamlilage Prageeth Chamara Silva (Sinhala: චාමර සිල්වා; born 14 December 1979) is a former Sri Lankan cricketer, who played all formats of the game for 12 years. He is a right-handed batsman and a leg-break bowler.

He has been compared with Aravinda de Silva due to his bow-legged stance. Silva was an important member of three World runner-up Sri Lanka teams in 2007, 2009 and 2011.

== Early and domestic career ==
He was educated at the Panadura Royal College. Having set a steady record for his club Panadura, he captained the team and secured a good record including a 54 on his One Day International debut against Australia. Since 1998, he has played List A cricket and since 2004, Twenty20 cricket with moderate success and steady averages. He made his Twenty20 debut on 17 August 2004, for Sinhalese Sports Club in the 2004 SLC Twenty20 Tournament.

In March 2018, he was named in Colombo's squad for the 2017–18 Super Four Provincial Tournament. The following month, he was also named in Colombo's squad for the 2018 Super Provincial One Day Tournament. In March 2019, he was named in Colombo's squad for the 2019 Super Provincial One Day Tournament.

Having represented the Sri Lanka Police cricket team that won joint champion status in the 2023 Sri Lanka Cricket first-class competition, Silva was appointed to the police service in the rank of chief inspector of police (CIP).

== International career ==
He made his Test debut in New Zealand and had the worst possible start being dismissed for a pair just like his teammate Marvan Atapattu. He was given a second chance however and immediately justified his selection with an entertaining 61 in the first innings of the 2nd Test, enjoying a 121 run partnership with Kumar Sangakkara. In the second innings he improved further, making a very aggressive unbeaten 152, hitting 20 fours and batting right through with the tail (most notably Chaminda Vaas, putting on 88 runs together) before running out of partners.

Silva scored his first One Day International hundred against India just 3 weeks before the World Cup. His good form continued in the Cricket World Cup 2007, he managed to make 350 runs with an average of 43.75 with 4 half centuries and a highest score of 64. His success in the middle order has helped to give Sri Lanka a boost in their one-day and test sides particularly after veteran middle order batsmen Russel Arnold announced his retirement at the end of the World Cup.

== Fixing allegations ==
Chamara Silva has been banned from all forms of cricket from September 2017 for two years due to the alleged misconduct during a domestic first class cricket match between Panadura Cricket Club and Kalutara Physical Culture Club along with Manoj Deshapriya. Chamara Silva, the captain of the Panadura Cricket Club was found guilty of match-fixing allegations after the unusual scoring rate by Panadura side in a first class cricket match in January 2017.
