= Amal Buddika Peiris =

Sri Lankan cricketer (born 1983)

Personal information
- Full name: Mahathelge Amal Buddika Peiris
- Born: 14 May 1983 (age 43); Moratuwa, Sri Lanka
- Batting: Right-handed
- Bowling: Right-arm off break
- Source: Cricinfo, 29 July 2020

Amal Buddika Peiris (born 14 May 1983) is a Sri Lankan first-class cricketer. He made his first-class debut in the 2002–03 season, and later made his Twenty20 debut for Sebastianites Cricket and Athletic Club on 29 October 2005. He made his List A debut for Sebastianites Cricket and Athletic Club on 1 November 2005.
