= Lasith Fernando =

Sri Lankan cricketer (born 1983)

Personal information
- Born: 8 April 1983 (age 43); Colombo, Sri Lanka
- Source: ESPNcricinfo, 15 December 2016

Lasith Fernando (born 8 April 1983) is a Sri Lankan cricketer. He played 91 first-class and 54 List A matches between 2002 and 2017. He was also part of Sri Lanka's squad for the 2002 Under-19 Cricket World Cup.
