= Tharaka Waduge =

Sri Lankan cricketer (born 1986)

Personal information
- Full name: Watta Waduge Pubudu Tharaka
- Born: 27 February 1986 (age 40); Colombo, Sri Lanka
- Batting: Right-handed
- Bowling: Right-arm medium
- Source: ESPNcricinfo, 30 July 2020

Tharaka Waduge (born 27 February 1986) is a Sri Lankan first-class cricketer. He made his List A debut for Kurunegala Youth Cricket Club in the 2006–07 Premier Limited Overs Tournament on 8 November 2006. He made his first-class debut for Kurunegala Youth Cricket Club against Singha SC in Tier B of the 2006–07 Premier Trophy on 17 November 2006. He made his Twenty20 debut for Lankan Cricket Club in the 2012 CSN Premier Clubs T20 Tournament on 27 March 2012.
