= Gayan Sirisoma =

Sri Lankan cricketer (born 1981)

Personal information
- Full name: Rajpakse Manikkunambi Gayan Kavinga Sirisoma
- Born: 22 September 1981 (age 45); Ambalangoda, Sri Lanka
- Source: Cricinfo, 15 March 2017

Gayan Sirisoma (born 22 September 1981) is a Sri Lankan cricketer. He made his first-class debut in the 2002–03 season and has played more than 100 matches.
