= Suwanji Madanayake =

Sri Lankan cricketer (born 1972)

Personal information
- Born: 28 August 1972 (age 54); Kandy, Sri Lanka
- Nickname: Maddy-Madey-Madaa
- Height: 5 ft 8 in (173 cm)
- Batting: Left-handed
- Bowling: Slow Left-arm
- Role: All-rounder
- Relatives: Thushira Madanayake (Brother)
- Source: ESPNcricinfo, 21 May 2020

Suwanji Madanayake (born 28 August 1972) is a Sri Lankan cricketer. He studied at Kingswood College, Kandy. He has played in more than 130 first-class matches since 1991/92. He is the first Sri Lankan player to play in the Liverpool league.
