= Thilina Herath =

Sri Lankan cricketer (born 1987)

Personal information
- Born: 16 May 1987 (age 39); Kurunegala, Sri Lanka
- Source: Cricinfo, 7 April 2017

Thilina Herath (born 16 May 1987) is a Sri Lankan cricketer. He made his List A debut for Kurunegala District in the 2016–17 Districts One Day Tournament on 18 March 2017.
