= Thushira Madanayake =

Sri Lankan cricketer (born 1981)

Personal information
- Born: 10 August 1981 (age 45); Kandy, Sri Lanka
- Batting: Left-handed
- Bowling: Right-arm offbreak
- Role: Allrounder
- Relatives: Suwanji Madanayake (Brother)
- Source: ESPNcricinfo, 13 July 2020

Thushira Madanayake (born 10 August 1981) is a Sri Lankan cricketer. He studied at Kingswood College, Kandy. He made his first-class debut in the 2000/01 season, and has played more than 50 first-class matches to date. He made his Twenty20 debut on 17 August 2004, for Burgher Recreation Club in the 2004 SLC Twenty20 Tournament.
