= Roscoe Thattil =

Sri Lankan cricketer (born 1992)

Personal information
- Born: 4 July 1992 (age 34); Colombo, Sri Lanka
- Batting: Left-handed
- Bowling: Right-arm offbreak
- Source: Cricinfo, 16 March 2017

Roscoe Thattil (born 4 July 1992) is a Sri Lankan cricketer. He made his first-class debut for Sri Lanka Air Force Sports Club in the 2011–12 Premier Trophy on 5 February 2012.
