= Hashan Prabath =

Sri Lankan cricketer (born 1992)

Personal information
- Born: 3 October 1992 (age 34); Polonnaruwa, Sri Lanka
- Source: Cricinfo, 7 April 2017

Hashan Prabath (born 3 October 1992) is a Sri Lankan cricketer. He made his List A debut for Kurunegala District in the 2016–17 Districts One Day Tournament on 18 March 2017.
