= Samith Dushantha =

Sri Lankan cricketer (born 1984)

Personal information
- Born: 30 November 1984 (age 41); Aluthgama, Sri Lanka
- Source: Cricinfo, 4 April 2017

Samith Dushantha (born 30 November 1984) is a Sri Lankan cricketer. He made his first-class debut for Saracens Sports Club in the 2006–07 Premier Trophy on 10 November 2006.

In April 2018, he was named in Colombo's squad for the 2018 Super Provincial One Day Tournament.
