= Kalutara Town Club =

Sri Lankan cricket club

Kalutara Town Club are a first-class cricket team based in Kalutara, Sri Lanka. They played one season of first-class cricket, in the 1996–97 Saravanamuttu Trophy. They had previously been the inaugural winner of the Daily News Trophy in 1938 in the days before it had first-class status. They currently play in Tier B of the Premier Trophy.

They played 13 first-class matches in 1996–97, losing 10 and drawing three, and finished last. Their captain was Pathmanath Perera, who hit the team's highest score, 133, against Sebastianites Cricket and Athletic Club, and took the best bowling figures, 6 for 41, against Panadura Sports Club.

Since that season Kalutara Town Club competed at the next level below first-class before returning to the Premier Trophy in 2016. Their home ground is now Surrey Village Cricket Ground in Maggona, not far from Kalutara.

== Honours ==
- Daily News Trophy (1)

1938
