= Panadura Sports Club =

Personnel
- Captain: (Sri Lanka) Dushan Hemantha (T20)
- Coach: (Sri Lanka) Sampath Perera

Team information
- Colours: Pale pink
- Founded: 1924
- Home ground: Panadura Esplanade

History
- Premier Trophy wins: Runner Up – 2008
- Premier Limited Overs Tournament wins: Runner Up – 2009
- Major Clubs T20 Tournament wins: Runner Up – 2025
- Official website: psc.lk

Panadura Sports Club is a first-class cricket team based in Panadura, Sri Lanka. Their home ground is the Panadura Esplanade.

== History ==
Panadura Sports Club was founded in 1924, with M. J. Jayatillake as its first president. Its first patron, Dr. A. S. Goonewardene, paid for the club's premises, which were opened on 1 July 1927 by Herbert Stanley, the Governor of Ceylon. Members included D. S. Senanayake, later the first Prime Minister of Ceylon. The club's first cricket team was captained by F. A. C. Thirimanna. Its players have come mainly from schools in the Panadura area, including St. John's College, Sri Sumangala College, St. Anthony's College, Mahanama College, Royal College and Wadduwa Central College. Dhanasiri Weerasinghe played for Sri Lanka in 1958, before the country gained Test status. The club held its centenary celebrations in early 2025. In February 2026 the club's T20 captain, Dushan Hemantha, played for Sri Lanka at the 2026 T20 World Cup. The club has reciprocal membership arrangements with the Burgher Recreation Club, Galle Sports Club and Bloomfield Cricket and Athletic Club. The team has played first-class cricket since 1988–89: of the 265 matches it has played as of September 2020, it has 61 wins, 68 losses, and 136 draws. They have also played List A cricket since 1991–92: 118 matches, for 55 wins, 52 losses, 2 ties and 9 no-results.

In 2025 the club reached the final of the Major Clubs T20 Tournament, losing to Colombo Cricket Club by six wickets.

== Teams ==
The club fields men's teams in the Premier Division A (Major League) three and four-day tournament, the Major Clubs limited-overs and T20 tournaments, the Under-23 Division A tournament and the Division III Kalutara District tournament. It also has a women's team in the Women's Major League tournament.

== Honours ==
- 1985 – Bristol Trophy: runners-up
- 1987 – Lakspray Trophy (Division I): runners-up
- 1993 – Under-23 Yellow Pages Trophy: champions
- 1998–99 – Division II Donavan Andree Trophy: champions
- 2002–03 – Division II Donavan Andree Trophy: champions
- 2007–08 – Premier Trophy Tier B: runners-up
- 2008–09 – Premier Trophy Tier B: runners-up
- 2009–10 – Premier Trophy Tier B: runners-up
- 2014–15 – Under-23 Division II: runners-up
- 2025 – Major Clubs T20 Tournament: runners-up

== Division I captains ==
- 1930–1932 – F. A. C. Thirimanna
- 1933–1934 – G. G. Perera
- 1935 – G. C. Roberts
- 1936–1941 – G. G. Perera
- 1942–1945 – C. M. Caldera
- 1946–1949 – A. O. S. Dissanayake
- 1950–1951 – E. F. De Zilwa
- 1952 – G. G. Perera
- 1953–1959 – G. C. S. Karunaratne
- 1962 – C. Neil D. Perera
- 1963 – D. S. D. Narangoda
- 1965 – C. Neil D. Perera
- 1966 – Cecil Perera
- 1967 – C. Neil D. Perera
- 1968–1969 – Romulus Goonatilake
- 1969–1970 – Mahinda Seneviratne
- 1971 – W. A. N. Silva
- 1972 – R. L. Goonatilake
- 1973–1974 – Mahinda Seneviratne
- 1975–1976 – A. Upali Seneviratne
- 1977–1978 – I. C. Nagodavithana
- 1979–1980 – S. Handunge
- 1981–1982 – Osadhi Cooray
- 1983 – S. Handunge
- 1984 – Rohitha Costa
- 1985–1987 – Janath Silva
- 1988–1989 – Vijith Deshapriya
- 1990–1991 – Jude De Silva
- 1992 – Saman Kumara
- 1993–1995 – Don Anurasiri
- 1996–1997 – Saman Kumara
- 1998 – Kapila Silva
- 1999 – Manjula Silva
- 2000 – Sham Liyanage
- 2001–2003 – Chamara Silva
- 2004 – Ruchira Palliyaguru
- 2005 – Amila Perera
- 2006 – Carman Mapatuna
- 2007–2009 – Surendra Kumara
- 2010–2011 – Sudesh Umayanga
- 2011–2012 – Nilantha Cooray
- 2012–2013 – Chamara Silva
- 2013–2014 – Chandana Aravinda and Charitha Buddhika
- 2014–2015 – Samith Dushantha
- 2015–2016 – Sudesh Umayanga
- 2016–2017 – Chamara Silva
- 2017–2018 – Shashika Pussegolla
- 2018–2019 – Shehan Weerasinghe
- 2019–2020 – Harsha Cooray
- 2020–2021 – Hans Fernando
- 2021–2022 – Dilruwan Perera

== Ground and facilities ==
The club plays at the Panadura Esplanade, which has a Pavilion End and an Urban Council End. Schools in Panadura have also used the ground for home matches. Besides cricket, the club has tennis and billiards sections and a gym.

=== Facilities ===
Club facilities include a bar lounge, the Sir Herbert Stanley Lounge, a President's Lounge, a family room, a coffee club, a karaoke room, a card room and a gym.

== Other sports ==
Besides cricket, the club has tennis and billiards sections, each with an elected captain and secretary, as well as a card room and a gym.

== Membership ==
The club has ten membership categories: honorary life, life, ordinary, cricket playing, tennis playing, lady, senior, honorary, corporate and juvenile members. Honorary life members are elected by a majority vote at a general meeting, and life membership is open to members with at least ten years of continuous membership.

== Milestones ==
- 1924 – Club founded, with M. J. Jayatillake as first president.
- 1927 – Club premises opened on 1 July by Herbert Stanley, Governor of Ceylon.
- 1930 – F. A. C. Thirimanna becomes the first Division I captain.
- 1958 – Dhanasiri Weerasinghe plays for Sri Lanka.
- 1988–89 – First first-class season.
- 1991–92 – First List A season.
- 1993 – Wins the Under-23 Yellow Pages Trophy.
- 1998–99 and 2002–03 – Wins the Division II Donavan Andree Trophy.
- 2025 – Centenary celebrations; runners-up in the Major Clubs T20 Tournament.

== Presidents ==
- 1924 – 1935 – M. J. Jayatillake
- 1936 – 1943 – Dr. C.W. Dias
- 1944 – 1947 – A. C. Goonaratne
- 1948 – C. A. Jansz
- 1949 – 1950 – W. P. H. Dias
- 1951 – 1953 – H. D. Perera
- 1954 – 1961 – Dr. A. Simon Silva
- 1962 – 1965 – K. J. R. Kuruppu
- 1966 – 1970 – Tissa Goonaratne
- 1971 – 1973 – Ashoka Jayatillake
- 1974 – 1975 – Susantha Perera
- 1976 – Kumara Jayatillake
- 1977 – 1978 – C. Neil D. Perera
- 1979 – 1980 – P. Fonseka
- 1981 – 1983 – Chandra Karunanayake
- 1984 – Timothy Weeraratne
- 1985 – Gaurie Wickramasinghe
- 1986 – 1990 – Mahinda Seneviratne
- 1991 – Cecil Perera
- 1992 – Douglas De Fonseka
- 1993 – Chandra Karunanayake
- 1994 – 1998 – Mahinda Seneviratne
- 1999 – 2002 – M. Anurath Abeyratne
- 2003 – 2004 – Mahinda Seneviratne
- 2005 – 2015 – Ravin Wickramaratne
- 2016 – present – Jayantha Silva

== Players ==
The club lists the following national cricketers.

=== Players produced by the club ===
- Akila Dananjaya (Mahanama College Panadura)
- Charitha Buddhika (St John's College Panadura)
- Chamara Silva (Royal College Panadura)
- Dilruwan Perera (Sri Sumangala College Panadura)
- Don Anurasiri (Sri Sumangala College Panadura)
- Kamil Mishara (Mahanama College Panadura)
- Ravindra Pushpakumara (St John's College Panadura)
- Ravin Wickramaratne (Sri Sumangala College Panadura)
- Tissa Eleperuma (Sri Sumangala College Panadura)
- Amila Perera (Sri Sumangala College Panadura)
- Manoj Chanaka
- Nimesh Vimukthi
- Rohan Soysa (Sri Sumangala College Panadura)
- Sanjaya Chathuranga
- Vishen Halambage
- Vishva Chathuranga
- Jude De Silva
- Kapila Silva (Sri Sumangala College Panadura)
- Sahan Mihira
- Surendra Kumara
- Vijith Deshapriya (Sri Sumangala College Panadura)
- Vishwa Lahiru (Sri Sumangala College Panadura)

Women

- Chethana Vimukthi
- Piumi Wathsala
- Rashmika Sewwandi
- Amadhi Wijesinghe
- Erandi Warnakulasooriya
- Pramudi Methsara
- Rishmi Sanjana
- Vimoksha Balasooriya
- Vishmi Savindi

=== Players who have represented the club ===
- Dinusha Fernando
- Dushan Hemantha
- Hasantha Fernando
- Indika de Saram
- Indika Gallage (Sri Sumangala College Panadura)
- Koshan Dhanushka
- Madura Lakmal
- Mishen Silva
- Mohamed Dilshad
- Oshada Fernando (Sri Sumangala College Panadura)
- Prasanna Jayawardene
- Ruchira Palliyaguruge
- Sujeewa de Silva
- Tharindu Kaushal
- Trevin Mathew
- Amila Sandaruwan
- Charith Jayampathi
- Chathura Peiris
- Hans Fernando
- Lahiru Abeysinghe
- Lasith Fernando
- Nadeera Nawela
- Pasan Wanasinghe
- Prabuddha Perera
- Rajeewa Weerasinghe
- Ranitha Liyanarachchi
- Sineth Jayawardene
- Umesh Karunaratne
