= Kalutara Physical Culture Club =

Kalutara Physical Culture Centre
History
- First-class debut: Antonians Sports Club in 1991

Kalutara Physical Culture Centre was a first class cricket team in Sri Lanka which featured in the Saravanamuttu Trophy competition of 1991–92 and the 2016–17 Premier League Tournament Tier B.

== List of players ==
The following is a list of players of the Kalutara Physical Culture Centre team.

- RW Chandrasiri
- B. David
- S. Devapriya
- Mahesh Hemantha
- Louis Karunaratne
- K. Mendis
- P. Peiris
- T. Silva

== See also ==
- List of Sri Lankan cricket teams
