= Sri Lanka Air Force Sports Club (cricket) =

Air Force Sports Club
Personnel
- Coach: Rohan Gallapaththi

Team information
- Home ground: Air Force Ground (current); Rifle Green (Note: Sometimes spelt Riffle Green.) (historical)

The Sri Lanka Air Force Sports Council is the governing body for cricket in the Sri Lankan Air Forces (SLAF). Its representative men's cricket team, Sri Lanka Air Force Sports Club (AFSC), competed in Sri Lanka's top-level domestic competition, now known as the Major League Tournament, from 1967–68 onwards. Many Sri Lankan internationals have played for the club at some point in their career. They were relegated to second-tier domestic cricket following the 2023–24 season.

The Sports Council also fields a women's cricket team, Sri Lanka Air Force Sports Club Women, who compete in the Major Club Women's 50 Over Tournament.

== History ==
In 1961–62, Sri Lanka Air Force Sports Club, then-named Adastrians Cricket Club, won the Daily News Trophy, Sri Lanka's Division Three cricket league, under the captaincy of Harry Gunathilake. In 1966–67, they won the Donovan Andree Trophy (Division Two) under KM Nelson's captaincy, going almost undefeated throughout the season, and gaining promotion to the Saravanamuttu Trophy, Sri Lanka's top-level domestic competition. Their home ground during this period was Rifle Green in Colombo, which they shared with the Saracens Sports Club. As of 2017, they had played in Division One for fifty unbroken years, though without ever having won the competition.

At the end of the 2023–24 season, after finishing in the bottom two places of Major League Tournament Group B, 10th place out of 11, they were relegated back to the second tier of domestic cricket, the Governor's Trophy 2-Day Tournament.

== Notable players ==
=== Men's team ===
Notable players include:

- Dilip Tharaka (2016–17 to 2018–19) : S. H. D. Tharaka
- Roscoe Thattil (2011–12 to 2022–23) : R. P. Thattil
- Sanath Jayasuriya (2011–12) : S. T. Jayasuriya. Midway through the 2011–12 Premier Limited Overs Tournament, aged 42, a few months after his international retirement, he switched to AFSC from his long-term club Bloomfield.
- Charith Tissera (2000–01 to 2005–06) : W. C. R. Tissera
- Susil Fernando (1983–84 to 1989–90) : E. R. N. S. Fernando. He was the first SLAF member to play Test cricket for Sri Lanka.
- Tony Opatha (c. 1968 to 1977). Opatha moved to the Air Force Sports Club at the age of 21, after stints with the Saracens Sports Club, Singhalese Sports Club, and Colombo Cricket Club. He would later captain AFSC.
- KM Nelson (c. 1966–67). In 1966–67, Nelson captained SLAF to victory in Sri Lanka's Division Two domestic competition, leading from the front with 66 wickets. In 1967, he was awarded the Air Force Sports Council's Vartharasa Trophy for the Most Outstanding Sportsman of the year. Following his sporting retirement, Nelson moved into cricket administration. In the mid-1990s, he served as the representative of Nondescripts Cricket Club to Sri Lanka Cricket (SLC); he was an ally of the SLC president Upali Dharmadasa. He also served on several national selection committees for the Sri Lankan team.

=== Women's team ===
- Chamari Athapaththu
- Anushka Sanjeewani
- Malki Madara

== See also ==
- List of Sri Lankan cricket teams
- Sri Lanka Air Force Sports Club – other Sri Lanka Air Force sports teams
- List of Sri Lanka Air Force Sports Club cricketers
