= Kurunegala Youth Cricket Club =

Sri Lankan cricket club

Nugegoda Sports and Welfare Club
History
- First-class debut: Tamil Union Cricket and Athletic Club in 1991 at Nondescripts Cricket Club Ground
- List A debut: 1992
- Twenty20 debut: 2004

Kurunegala Youth Cricket Club is a first-class cricket team in Sri Lanka. They made their first-class debut in 1991 against Tamil Union Cricket and Athletic Club at Nondescripts Cricket Club Ground in Colombo.

In the 1993/94 season, they were bowled out for 31 runs in one of their innings in a match against Sinhalese Sports Club, the joint-lowest total in Sri Lankan first-class cricket history.

== Notable players ==
Notable players include:

- Tharaka Waduge (2006–07 to 2016–17) : W. W. P. Taraka
- Eric Upashantha (1991–92) : K. E. A. Upashantha
- Asela Wewalwala (1999–2000 to 2005–06) : A. S. Wewalwala
- Tharinda Wijesinghe (2017–18 to 2022–23) : W. A. D. T. Wijesinghe

== See also ==
- List of Sri Lankan cricket teams
