= Lankan Cricket Club =

Cricket team of Sri Lanka

Personnel
- Captain: (Sri Lanka) Chanaka Ruwansiri
- Coach: (Sri Lanka) Nuwan Shiroman

Team information
- City: Colombo
- Colours: Blue , Yellow

History
- Premier Trophy wins: none
- Premier Limited Overs Tournament wins: none
- Twenty20 Tournament wins: none

Lankan Cricket Club is a first-class cricket team in Sri Lanka.

== History ==
Lankan Cricket Club played in the Premier Trophy from 2005–06 to 2012–13. It was one of six clubs that lost their places when the competition was reduced from 20 teams to 14 for the 2013–14 season. It also lost its List A status at the same time. The club played at lower levels until the 2019–20 season when it was promoted back to the 'A' division of the Premier Trophy.

In its eight seasons of first-class cricket, Lankan Cricket Club played 74 matches, with 11 wins, 28 losses and 35 draws. It played 59 matches of List A cricket, with 28 wins, 28 losses, one tie and two matches that did not reach a result.

== Current squad ==
These players featured in matches for Lankan CC in the 2019/20 season.

Players with international caps are listed in bold.

| No | Name | Nat | Age | Batting Style | Bowling Style |
Batsmen
| – | Sahan Peiris | (Sri Lanka) | 27 | Right-handed | Right-arm off-break |
| – | Methsith Jayamanna | (Sri Lanka) | 27 | Right-handed | Right-arm medium-fast |
| – | Lahiru Dilshan | (Sri Lanka) | 26 | Right-handed | Right-arm off-break |
| – | Kevin Perera | (Sri Lanka) | 25 | Left-handed | Right-arm leg-break |
All-Rounders
| 24 | Damitha Silva | (Sri Lanka) | 27 | Left-handed | Slow left-arm orthodox |
| – | Sahan Nanayakkare | (Sri Lanka) | 30 | Left-handed | Slow left-arm orthodox |
| – | Geeth Kumara | (Sri Lanka) | 37 | Left-handed | Slow left-arm wrist-spin |
| – | Chanaka Ruwansiri (Captain) | (Sri Lanka) | 35 | Right-handed | Right-arm off-break |
Wicket-Keepers
| – | Umesh Lakshan | (Sri Lanka) | 25 | Left-handed | – |
| – | Kasun Abeyrathne | (Sri Lanka) | 27 | Right-handed | – |
Pace Bowlers
| – | Udith Madushan | (Sri Lanka) | 28 | Right-handed | Right-arm medium-fast |
Spin Bowlers
| – | Keshan Wijerathne | (Sri Lanka) | 29 | Right-handed | Right-arm off-break |

== Records ==
The highest first-class score was 175 by Ashen Silva against Nondescripts Cricket Club in 2011–12. The best innings bowling figures were 8 for 58 by Ranil Dhammika against Panadura Sports Club in 2007–08. Gayan Sirisoma took seven wickets in an innings five times; in 27 matches for Lankan Cricket Club, he took 148 wickets at an average of 16.95.

== Clubs with similar names ==
There is a Lankans Cricket Club in Toronto, and in England there are several clubs with similar names: Leicester Lankans Cricket Club and Midland Lankans Cricket Club, for example. There are also several instances around the world of a Sri Lankans Cricket Club and a Sri Lankan Cricket Club.
