= 2019–20 Invitation Limited Over Tournament =

Cricket tournament

- Dates: 14 – 31 December 2019
- Administrator(s): Sri Lanka Cricket
- Cricket format: List A cricket
- Tournament format(s): Round-robin then knockout
- Host(s): Sri Lanka
- Champions: Chilaw Marians Cricket Club (1st title)
- Participants: 25
- Matches: 73
- Most runs: Angelo Perera (384)
- Most wickets: Kamindu Mendis (19)

The 2019–20 Invitation Limited Over Tournament was a List A cricket competition that took place in Sri Lanka. It ran from 14 to 31 December 2019, with twenty-five teams taking part. It was the first edition of the Invitation Limited Over Tournament, replacing the Premier Limited Overs Tournament. This was after the Sri Lanka Cricket failed to approve the latter due to delays in their domestic cricket structure. Sinhalese Sports Club won the last edition of the Premier Limited Overs Tournament.

On 19 December 2019, Sandun Weerakkody scored the fastest List A century by a Sri Lankan batsman, scoring 101 not out from 39 balls for Sinhalese Sports Club against Burgher Recreation Club. The following day, only one of the twelve scheduled matches reached a result, with the other eleven fixtures all abandoned due to rain.

Ahead of the final day of fixtures, Sinhalese Sports Club, Sri Lanka Army Sports Club, Nondescripts Cricket Club, Panadura Sports Club, Saracens Sports Club, Sri Lanka Air Force Sports Club and Tamil Union Cricket and Athletic Club had all qualified for the quarterfinals. Following the conclusion of the final day of group matches, Chilaw Marians Cricket Club had also reached the quarterfinals of the tournament. Sinhalese Sports Club, Chilaw Marians Cricket Club, Nondescripts Cricket Club and Sri Lanka Army Sports Club all won their quarterfinal matches to progress in the competition.

Chilaw Marians Cricket Club and Nondescripts Cricket Club won their respective semi-final matches, advancing in the finals of the tournament. Chilaw Marians Cricket Club beat Nondescripts in the final by 91 runs to win the tournament.

== Group stage ==
=== Group A ===
14 December 2019
Scorecard

Burgher Recreation Club; 155 (43.4 overs)	v	Negombo Cricket Club; 156/4 (28.4 overs)
Shanuka Dulaj 75 (103); Laksitha Rasanjana 3/36 (10 overs)		Dilshan Munaweera 61 (52); Duvindu Tillakaratne 2/20 (7 overs)

Negombo Cricket Club won by 6 wickets
Burgher Recreation Club Ground, Colombo
Umpires: Kapila Kottahachchi and Sanjeewa Fernando

- Negombo Cricket Club won the toss and elected to field.
- Nimantha Gunasiri (Burgher Recreation Club), Haren Buddila and Laksitha Rasanjana (Negombo Cricket Club) all made their List A debuts.

14 December 2019
Scorecard

Sinhalese Sports Club; 272/8 (50 overs)	v	Lankan Cricket Club; 211 (44.3 overs)
Charith Asalanka 119* (128); Keshan Wijerathne 3/48 (9 overs)		Keshan Wijerathne 39* (30); Tharindu Ratnayake 3/31 (9.3 overs)

Sinhalese Sports Club won by 61 runs
Singhalese Sports Club Cricket Ground, Colombo
Umpires: Hemantha Boteju and Nilantha Semasinghe

- Lankan Cricket Club won the toss and elected to field.
- Nuwanidu Fernando (Sinhalese Sports Club), Sawan Prabash and Dunith Wellalage (Lankan Cricket Club) all made their List A debuts.

14 December 2019
Scorecard

Badureliya Sports Club; 184 (48.5 overs)	v	Sri Lanka Army Sports Club; 188/5 (40.1 overs)
Buddika Sanjeewa 33 (38); Janith Silva 3/22 (6 overs)		Dushan Vimukthi 84 (92); Buddika Sanjeewa 3/38 (8.1 overs)

Sri Lanka Army Sports Club won by 5 wickets
Sri Lanka Army Ordnance Corps International Cricket Stadium, Horana
Umpires: Maurice Dela Zilva and Susantha Dissanayake

- Sri Lanka Army Sports Club won the toss and elected to field.
- Mahesh Kumara, Heshan Hettiarchchi, Lahiru Wijetunga, Shihan de Silva (Sri Lanka Army Sports Club) and Vaibhav Mali (Badureliya Sports Club) all made their List A debuts.

15 December 2019
Scorecard

Sinhalese Sports Club; 246 (49.1 overs)	v	Badureliya Sports Club; 240/9 (50 overs)
Danushka Gunathilaka 48 (83); Lahiru Samarakoon 3/51 (8.1 overs)		Dushan Hemantha 67 (80); Dhammika Prasad 3/40 (6.4 overs)

Sinhalese Sports Club won by 6 runs
Surrey Village Ground, Maggona
Umpires: Chamara de Soysa and Ravindra Kottahachchi

- Badureliya Sports Club won the toss and elected to field.

15 December 2019
Scorecard

Burgher Recreation Club; 148 (42.3 overs)	v	Lankan Cricket Club; 152/2 (38.3 overs)
Lisula Lakshan 67 (86); Chanaka Ruwansiri 3/15 (6 overs)		Primosh Perera 69* (109); Kevin Koththigoda 2/25 (6.3 overs)

Lankan Cricket Club won by 8 wickets
Burgher Recreation Club Ground, Colombo
Umpires: Eric Kannangara and Keerthi Bandara

- Lankan Cricket Club won the toss and elected to field.

15 December 2019
Scorecard

Negambo Cricket Club; 182/8 (50 overs)	v	Sri Lanka Army Sports Club; 185/4 (45.2 overs)
Angelo Jayasinghe 68* (94); Dushan Vimukthi 2/25 (9 overs)		Dushan Vimukthi 71* (103); Dilshan Munaweera 1/18 (6 overs)

Sri Lanka Army Sports Club won by 6 wickets
Sri Lanka Army Ordnance Corps International Cricket Stadium, Horana
Umpires: Kitsiri Jayaweera and Pradeep Udawatta

- Sri Lanka Army Sports Club won the toss and elected to field.
- Lakshitha Manasinghe, Sheshan Fernando (Negambo Cricket Club) and Sanjeew Coomaraswamy (Sri Lanka Army Sports Club) all made their List A debuts.

17 December 2019
Scorecard

Badureliya Sports Club; 196 (47.2 overs)	v	Lankan Cricket Club; 72/3 (22 overs)
Alankara Asanka Silva 40 (85); Keshan Wijerathne 2/21 (4 overs)		Geeth Kumara 26* (51); Vaibhav Mali 1/5 (1 over)

Badureliya Sports Club won by 5 runs (DLS method)
Surrey Village Ground, Maggona
Umpires: Sisira Kumara Perera and Asanga Jayasooriya

- Lankan Cricket Club won the toss and elected to field.

17 December 2019
Scorecard

Sinhalese Sports Club; 296/9 (50 overs)	v	Negambo Cricket Club; 95/4 (21 overs)
Charith Asalanka 78 (97); Ayantha de Silva 3/47 (8 overs)		Madawa Warnapura 23* (20); Kalana Perera 2/31 (6 overs)

Sinhalese Sports Club won by 52 runs (DLS method)
Singhalese Sports Club Cricket Ground, Colombo
Umpires: Shantha Fonseka and Nilan De Silva

- Negombo Cricket Club won the toss and elected to field.

17 December 2019
Scorecard

Sri Lanka Army Sports Club; 253/8 (50 overs)	v	Burgher Recreation Club; 82/8 (30.4 overs)
Dushan Vimukthi 64 (65); Mohamed Shiraz 3/42 (9 overs)		Lasith Lakshan 16 (21); Dushan Vimukthi 3/5 (7.4 overs)

Sri Lanka Army Sports Club won by 141 runs (DLS method)
Sri Lanka Army Ordnance Corps International Cricket Stadium, Horana
Umpires: Ravindra Kottahachchi and Vidura Prasad

- Burgher Recreation Club won the toss and elected to field.
- Malindu Shehan (Burgher Recreation Club) made his List A debut.

18 December 2019
Scorecard

Negambo Cricket Club; 285/8 (50 overs)	v	Badureliya Sports Club; 196 (38.2 overs)
Ashen Silva 74 (92); Lahiru Samarakoon 3/53 (9 overs)		Vaibhav Mali 52 (67); Dilshan Munaweera 4/24 (5.2 overs)

Negambo Cricket Club won by 89 runs
Surrey Village Ground, Maggona
Umpires: Ravindra Kottahachchi and Pradeep Udawatta

- Badureliya Sports Club won the toss and elected to field.

19 December 2019
Scorecard

Burgher Recreation Club; 112 (37.2 overs)	v	Sinhalese Sports Club; 113/0 (9.2 overs)
Raminda Wijesooriya 25 (31); Tharindu Ratnayake 5/24 (10 overs)		Sandun Weerakkody 101* (39)

Sinhalese Sports Club won by 10 wickets
Burgher Recreation Club Ground, Colombo
Umpires: Ranmore Martinesz and Niroshana Amarasinghe

- Sinhalese Sports Club won the toss and elected to field.

19 December 2019
Scorecard

Lankan Cricket Club; 206/9 (34 overs)	v	Sri Lanka Army Sports Club; 157/7 (27 overs)
Sawan Kankanamge 61* (48); Lahiru Wijetunga 3/47 (5 overs)		Asela Gunaratne 53 (46); Keshan Wijerathne 3/33 (6 overs)

Lankan Cricket Club won by 11 runs (DLS method)
Navy Ground, Welisara
Umpires: Chaturan Sanjeewa and Keerthi Bandara

- Sri Lanka Army Sports Club won the toss and elected to field.
- Sahan Peiris (Lankan Cricket Club) made his List A debut.

20 December 2019
Scorecard

Burgher Recreation Club	v	Badureliya Sports Club

Match abandoned
Burgher Recreation Club Ground, Colombo
Umpires: Niroshana Amarasinghe and Ruchira Palliyaguruge

- No toss.
- No play was possible due to rain.

20 December 2019
Scorecard

Negambo Cricket Club	v	Lankan Cricket Club

Match abandoned
Bloomfield Cricket and Athletic Club Ground, Colombo
Umpires: Hemantha Boteju and Chaturan Sanjeewa

- No toss.
- No play was possible due to rain.

20 December 2019
Scorecard

Sinhalese Sports Club	v	Sri Lanka Army Sports Club

Match abandoned
Sinhalese Sports Club Ground, Colombo
Umpires: Ranmore Martinesz and Saman Mohan de Silva

- No toss.
- No play was possible due to rain.

=== Group B ===
14 December 2019
Scorecard

Colombo Cricket Club; 65 (27.1 overs)	v	Sri Lanka Ports Authority Cricket Club; 70/3 (19.1 overs)
Malindu Maduranga 16 (23); Chanaka Komasaru 3/10 (7.1 overs)		Prashan Wickramasinghe 27* (15); Nuwan Thushara 2/10 (3 overs)

Sri Lanka Ports Authority Cricket Club won by 7 wickets
Colombo Cricket Club Ground, Colombo
Umpires: Krishantha Rodrigo and Ranmore Martinesz

- Sri Lanka Ports Authority Cricket Club won the toss and elected to field.
- MPM Weerasinghe, BGS Mendis (Colombo Cricket Club) and Mithila Aravinda (Sri Lanka Ports Authority Cricket Club) all made their List A debuts.

14 December 2019
Scorecard

Nondescripts Cricket Club; 299/7 (50 overs)	v	Police Sports Club; 202/9 (50 overs)
Mahela Udawatte 82 (89); Nisar Ahmad 3/67 (10 overs)		VA Indulkar 56 (61); Sachindu Colombage 3/38 (10 overs)

Nondescripts Cricket Club won by 97 runs
Nondescripts Cricket Club Ground, Colombo
Umpires: Saman Mohan de Silva and Nilan De Silva

- Police Sports Club won the toss and elected to field.
- Hasindu Shamika, Lasan de Silva, Ramesh Kumara, Damsika Sigera and Nisar Ahmad (Police Sports Club) all made their List A debuts.

15 December 2019
Scorecard

Colombo Cricket Club; 249/9 (50 overs)	v	Kandy Customs Cricket Club; 70 (26.1 overs)
Malindu Maduranga 98 (124); Nimnaka Ratnayake 2/31 (7 overs)		Ian Dev Singh 27 (31); Ashan Priyanjan 4/8 (5.1 overs)

Colombo Cricket Club won by 179 runs
Colombo Cricket Club Ground, Colombo
Umpires: Rohitha Kottahachchi and R P Massalage

- Kandy Customs Cricket Club won the toss and elected to field.
- Thimira Malshan (Kandy Customs Cricket Club) made his List A debut.

15 December 2019
Scorecard

Police Sports Club; 155 (42.5 overs)	v	Chilaw Marians Cricket Club; 160/3 (20.4 overs)
Supun Madushanka 32 (22); Pulina Tharanga 2/19 (4 overs)		Thikshila de Silva 55* (27); Lasan de Silva 1/25 (4 overs)

Chilaw Marians Cricket Club won by 7 wickets
Police Park Ground, Colombo
Umpires: Hemantha Boteju and Upul Wewage

- Police Sports Club won the toss and elected to bat.

15 December 2019
Scorecard

Nondescripts Cricket Club; 293/8 (50 overs)	v	Sri Lanka Ports Authority Cricket Club; 203/6 (50 overs)
Upul Tharanga 100 (130); Yohan Chanuka 2/55 (8 overs)		Adeesha Nanayakkara 103* (108); Dilesh Gunaratne 3/25 (7 overs)

Nondescripts Cricket Club won by 90 runs
Nondescripts Cricket Club Ground, Colombo
Umpires: Maurice Dela Zilva and Niroshana Amarasinghe

- Sri Lanka Ports Authority Cricket Club won the toss and elected to field.

16 December 2019
Scorecard

Chilaw Marians Cricket Club; 241 (48.1 overs)	v	Galle Cricket Club; 73 (32.4 overs)
Lasith Croospulle 84 (97); Kavika Dilshan 4/28 (9.1 overs)		Vinura Dulsara 27 (82); Chathuranga Kumara 3/15 (4 overs)

Chilaw Marians Cricket Club won by 168 runs
Galle International Stadium, Galle
Umpires: Ranganath Prasanna and Rohitha Kottahachchi

- Galle Cricket Club won the toss and elected to field.
- Kaveesh Kumara, Kavindu Ediriweera, Vinura Dulsara and Kavika Dilshan (Galle Cricket Club) all made their List A debuts.

17 December 2019
Scorecard

Kandy Customs Cricket Club; 215/8 (50 overs)	v	Chilaw Marians Cricket Club; 219/5 (43 overs)
Ian Dev Singh 74 (89); Kamindu Mendis 2/38 (10 overs)		Lasith Croospulle 102* (134); Sampath Perera 3/47 (7 overs)

Chilaw Marians Cricket Club won by 5 wickets
Air Force Ground, Katunayake
Umpires: Rohitha Kottahachchi and Sanjeewa Fernando

- Kandy Customs Cricket Club won the toss and elected to bat.
- Neranjan Kumuditha (Kandy Customs Cricket Club) made his List A debut.

17 December 2019
Scorecard

Colombo Cricket Club; 226/8 (50 overs)	v	Police Sports Club; 176/7 (50 overs)
Ashan Priyanjan 70 (91); Lahiru Diyantha 3/49 (10 overs)		Supun Madushanka 39* (50); BGS Mendis 3/24 (10 overs)

Colombo Cricket Club won by 50 runs
Colombo Cricket Club Ground, Colombo
Umpires: Saman Mohan de Silva and Ruchira Palliyaguruge

- Colombo Cricket Club won the toss and elected to bat.

17 December 2019
Scorecard

Galle Cricket Club; 155 (48.3 overs)	v	Nondescripts Cricket Club; 160/2 (23.3 overs)
Nimesh Perera 61 (80); Dilesh Gunaratne 3/20 (7 overs)		Mahela Udawatte 71* (59); Kavika Dilshan 1/26 (5 overs)

Nondescripts Cricket Club won by 8 wickets
Nondescripts Cricket Club Ground, Colombo
Umpires: Krishantha Rodrigo and Gamini Dissanayake

- Galle Cricket Club won the toss and elected to bat.
- Chamika Gunasekara (Nondescripts Cricket Club) made his List A debut.

19 December 2019
Scorecard

Colombo Cricket Club; 272/4 (45 overs)	v	Galle Cricket Club; 63/3 (21 overs)
Ashan Priyanjan 89 (65); Nimesh Perera 1/28 (3 overs)		Vinura Dulsara 33* (54); Malinda Pushpakumara 2/13 (6 overs)

Colombo Cricket Club won by 55 runs (DLS method)
Galle International Stadium, Galle
Umpires: Sanjeewa Fernando and Eric Kannangara

- Galle Cricket Club won the toss and elected to field.
- Jacob Sachin and Roanaka Ahangama (Galle Cricket Club) both made their List A debuts.

19 December 2019
Scorecard

Nondescripts Cricket Club; 279/7 (45 overs)	v	Kandy Customs Cricket Club; 81 (27.2 overs)
Upul Tharanga 119 (119); Tharindu Weerasinghe 3/52 (9 overs)		Buddhika Prasad 19 (31); Chamika Karunaratne 2/8 (4 overs)

Nondescripts Cricket Club won by 198 runs
Nondescripts Cricket Club Ground, Colombo
Umpires: Maurice Dela Zilva and Thilak Fernando

- Kandy Customs Cricket Club won the toss and elected to field.
- Methusha Thilina (Kandy Customs Cricket Club) made his List A debut.

19 December 2019
Scorecard

Sri Lanka Ports Authority Cricket Club; 192 (47.5 overs)	v	Chilaw Marians Cricket Club; 150/9 (36 overs)
Adeesha Nanayakkara 72 (77); Chathuranga Kumara 3/29 (8 overs)		Pulina Tharanga 56 (51); Chaminda Bandara 4/42 (10 overs)

Sri Lanka Ports Authority Cricket Club won by 33 runs (DLS method)
Sri Lanka Army Ordnance Corps International Cricket Stadium, Horana
Umpires: Kapila Kottahachchi and R P Massalage

- Chilaw Marians Cricket Club won the toss and elected to field.

20 December 2019
Scorecard

Colombo Cricket Club	v	Chilaw Marians Cricket Club

Match abandoned
Colombo Cricket Club Ground, Colombo
Umpires: Ranganath Prasanna and Lyndon Hannibal

- No toss.
- No play was possible due to rain.

20 December 2019
Scorecard

Galle Cricket Club	v	Police Sports Club

Match abandoned
Galle International Stadium, Galle
Umpires: Rohitha Kottahachchi and Shantha Fonseka

- No toss.
- No play was possible due to rain.

20 December 2019
Scorecard

Kandy Customs Cricket Club; 136/6 (36 overs)	v	Sri Lanka Ports Authority Cricket Club; 92/2 (22 overs)
Chanaka Wijesinghe 42 (84); Rajeewa Weerasinghe 2/25 (7 overs)		Yohan de Silva 50 (65); Umega Chaturanga 1/17 (4 overs)

Sri Lanka Ports Authority Cricket Club won by 24 runs (DLS method)
Sri Lanka Army Ordnance Corps International Cricket Stadium, Horana
Umpires: Kapila Kottahachchi and Asanga Jayasooriya

- Kandy Customs Cricket Club won the toss and elected to bat.
- Supun Kavinda (Sri Lanka Ports Authority Cricket Club) made his List A debut.

22 December 2019
Scorecard

Colombo Cricket Club; 196 (48.2 overs)	v	Nondescripts Cricket Club; 199/6 (46.5 overs)
Minod Bhanuka 65 (93); Sachindu Colombage 5/46 (10 overs)		Pathum Nissanka 69 (105); Lahiru Gamage 2/19 (5 overs)

Nondescripts Cricket Club won by 4 wickets
Colombo Cricket Club Ground, Colombo
Umpires: Asanga Jayasooriya and Raveendra Wimalasiri

- Colombo Cricket Club won the toss and elected to bat.
- Sandun Mendis (Colombo Cricket Club) made his List A debut.

22 December 2019
Scorecard

Kandy Customs Cricket Club; 78 (26.2 overs)	v	Police Sports Club; 79/3 (25 overs)
Chanaka Wijesinghe 17 (34); Asel Sigera 4/10 (6 overs)		Dulash Udayanga 30* (63); Sachithra Perera 1/15 (4 overs)

Police Sports Club won by 7 wickets
Police Park Ground, Colombo
Umpires: Hemantha Boteju and Keerthi Bandara

- Police Sports Club won the toss and elected to field.
- Imesh Madushanka (Kandy Customs Cricket Club), Sachendra Gamaadikari and Janaka Rathnayake (Police Sports Club) all made their List A debuts.

22 December 2019
Scorecard

Sri Lanka Ports Authority Cricket Club; 166 (48.3 overs)	v	Galle Cricket Club; 167/4 (36.1 overs)
Gayan Maneeshan 42 (76); Saranga Rajaguru 2/45 (10 overs)		Mansoor Amjad 119* (113); Rajeewa Weerasinghe 2/25 (8 overs)

Galle Cricket Club won by 6 wickets
FTZ Sports Complex, Katunayake
Umpires: Pradeep Udawatta and Ruchira Palliyaguruge

- Galle Cricket Club won the toss and elected to field.

23 December 2019
Scorecard

Kandy Customs Cricket Club; 147 (45.1 overs)	v	Galle Cricket Club; 83/2 (22 overs)
Chrishen Aponsu 47 (73); Saranga Rajaguru 2/12 (5 overs)		Mansoor Amjad 51* (62); Tharindu Weerasinghe 1/10 (3 overs)

Galle Cricket Club won by 34 runs (DLS method)
Galle International Stadium, Galle
Umpires: Gamini Dissanayake and Ravindra Kottahachchi

- Galle Cricket Club won the toss and elected to field.
- Deshan Fernando and Sandaru Chanditha (Kandy Customs Cricket Club) both made their List A debuts.

23 December 2019
Scorecard

Nondescripts Cricket Club; 173 (44.5 overs)	v	Chilaw Marians Cricket Club; 177/5 (40.4 overs)
Chaturanga de Silva 40 (52); Kamindu Mendis 5/33 (8.5 overs)		Rumesh Buddika 53 (76); Dilesh Gunaratne 1/21 (7 overs)

Chilaw Marians Cricket Club won by 5 wickets
Nondescripts Cricket Club Ground, Colombo
Umpires: Rohitha Kottahachchi and Keerthi Bandara

- Nondescripts Cricket Club won the toss and elected to bat.

23 December 2019
Scorecard

Sri Lanka Ports Authority Cricket Club; 161 (49.3 overs)	v	Police Sports Club; 162/6 (44.2 overs)
Supun Kavinda 54 (80); Asel Sigera 4/22 (10 overs)		Dulash Udayanga 35 (71); Chanaka Komasaru 2/23 (10 overs)

Police Sports Club won by 4 wickets
Police Park Ground, Colombo
Umpires: Lyndon Hannibal and Nilan De Silva

- Police Sports Club won the toss and elected to field.
- Imesh Udayanga, Malith de Silva, Mohammed Faheem (Police Sports Club), Amoda Widanapathirana and Pasindu Ushettige (Sri Lanka Ports Authority Cricket Club) all made their List A debuts.

=== Group C ===
14 December 2019
Scorecard

Saracens Sports Club; 188 (45 overs)	v	Bloomfield Cricket and Athletic Club; 192/5 (46.3 overs)
Sithara Gimhan 66 (63); Madushan Ravichandrakumar 3/33 (10 overs)		Chamara Silva 51* (68); Milinda Siriwardana 2/42 (10 overs)

Bloomfield Cricket and Athletic Club won by 5 wickets
St Thomas College Ground, Moratuwa
Umpires: Gamini Dissanayake and Niroshana Amarasinghe

- Saracens Sports Club won the toss and elected to field.
- Akthab Cader (Bloomfield Cricket and Athletic Club) and Aravinda Bandara (Saracens Sports Club) both made their List A debuts.

14 December 2019
Scorecard

Colts Cricket Club; 319/6 (50 overs)	v	Sri Lanka Navy Sports Club; 143 (42.4 overs)
Dhananjaya Lakshan 106* (54); Dilanka Auwardt 2/66 (10 overs)		Savindu Peiris 27 (37); Prabath Jayasuriya 3/35 (10 overs)

Colts Cricket Club won by 176 runs
Colts Cricket Club Ground, Colombo
Umpires: Chamara de Soysa and Ruchira Palliyaguruge

- Sri Lanka Navy Sports Club won the toss and elected to field.
- Heshan Dhanushka, Nipun Malinga (Colts Cricket Club), Johanne de Silva and Samitha Ranga (Sri Lanka Navy Sports Club) all made their List A debuts.

14 December 2019
Scorecard

Kurunegala Youth Cricket Club; 188 (46.5 overs)	v	Panadura Sports Club; 176/7 (41 overs)
Lahiru Jayaratne 34 (42); Sithum Disanayaka 4/31 (9 overs)		Kashif Naved 62 (66); Navin Kavikara 4/19 (10 overs)

Panadura Sports Club won by 17 runs (DLS method)
Panadura Esplanade, Panadura
Umpires: Vidura Prasad and Pradeep Udawatta

- Kurunegala Youth Cricket Club won the toss and elected to bat.
- Dilshan Abeysinghe, Sithum Disanayaka (Panadura Sports Club), Jeewan Viraj and Avindu Theekshana (Kurunegala Youth Cricket Club) all made their List A debuts.

15 December 2019
Scorecard

Colts Cricket Club; 272/7 (47 overs)	v	Bloomfield Cricket and Athletic Club; 209 (43.1 overs)
Sangeeth Cooray 92 (115); Dileepa Jayalath 2/31 (9 overs)		Nimantha Perera 41 (34); Prabath Jayasuriya 3/46 (10 overs)

Colts Cricket Club won by 63 runs
Colts Cricket Club Ground, Colombo
Umpires: Krishantha Rodrigo and Raveendra Wimalasiri

- Bloomfield Cricket and Athletic Club won the toss and elected to field.
- Santhush Gunathilake (Colts Cricket Club) made his List A debut.

15 December 2019
Scorecard

Kurunegala Youth Cricket Club; 143 (44.1 overs)	v	Saracens Sports Club; 144/4 (32.4 overs)
Aravinda Akurugoda 43 (64); Saliya Saman 2/14 (7.1 overs)		Raveen Sayer 58 (96); Navin Kavikara 2/30 (9 overs)

Saracens Sports Club won by 6 wickets
Tyronne Fernando Stadium, Moratuwa
Umpires: Ranmore Martinesz and Thilak Fernando

- Saracens Sports Club won the toss and elected to field.
- Isitha Wijesundera (Saracens Sports Club) made his List A debut.

15 December 2019
Scorecard

Sri Lanka Navy Sports Club; 198/9 (50 overs)	v	Panadura Sports Club; 200/4 (42.2 overs)
Savindu Peiris 39 (43); Dilshan Abeysinghe 3/18 (10 overs)		Minhaj Jalill 84 (106); Sathik Nimalsha 3/41 (7 overs)

Panadura Sports Club won by 6 wickets
Navy Ground, Welisara
Umpires: Mohan de Silva and Asanga Jayasooriya

- Sri Lanka Navy Sports Club won the toss and elected to bat.

17 December 2019
Scorecard

Kurunegala Youth Cricket Club; 220 (47.4 overs)	v	Bloomfield Cricket and Athletic Club; 128/6 (20.5 overs)
Vinodh Perera 74 (101); Nimantha Perera 3/34 (7 overs)		Sachin Jayawardena 33 (29); Vinodh Perera 2/20 (4 overs)

Bloomfield Cricket and Athletic Club won by 4 wickets (DLS method)
Welagedara Stadium, Kurunegala
Umpires: Upul Wewage and Keerthi Bandara

- Bloomfield Cricket and Athletic Club won the toss and elected to field.
- Dilshan Kollure (Kurunegala Youth Cricket Club) made his List A debut.

17 December 2019
Scorecard

Panadura Sports Club; 245 (47.2 overs)	v	Colts Cricket Club; 192/9 (42.4 overs)
Raju Gayashan 72 (58); Nisala Tharaka 3/39 (9 overs)		Hashan Dumindu 45 (74); Chalana de Silva 5/41 (10 overs)

Panadura Sports Club won by 42 runs (DLS method)
Panadura Esplanade, Panadura
Umpires: Kapila Kottahachchi and Lyndon Hannibal

- Colts Cricket Club won the toss and elected to field.
- Rohan Sanjaya (Colts Cricket Club) made his List A debut.

17 December 2019
Scorecard

Sri Lanka Navy Sports Club; 103 (35.4 overs)	v	Saracens Sports Club; 105/3 (14.4 overs)
Supun Leelaratne 25 (54); Isitha Wijesundera 2/10 (6 overs)		Milinda Siriwardana 53* (41); Savindu Peiris 1/17 (3 overs)

Saracens Sports Club won by 7 wickets
Tyronne Fernando Stadium, Moratuwa
Umpires: Hemantha Boteju and Maurice Dela Zilva

- Sri Lanka Navy Sports Club won the toss and elected to bat.
- Vimud Sapnaka (Sri Lanka Navy Sports Club) made his List A debut.

19 December 2019
Scorecard

Bloomfield Cricket and Athletic Club; 180/8 (22 overs)	v	Panadura Sports Club; 8/1 (2 overs)
Mishen Silva 47 (33); Ashan Dilhara 4/40 (5 overs)		Vishva Chathuranga 5 (6); Dileepa Jayalath 1/2 (1 over)

No result
Bloomfield Cricket and Athletic Club Ground, Colombo
Umpires: Rohitha Kottahachchi and Upul Wewage

- Panadura Sports Club won the toss and elected to field.
- Janindu Inuwara and Ashan Dilhara (Panadura Sports Club) both made their List A debuts.

19 December 2019
Scorecard

Saracens Sports Club; 165 (40.3 overs)	v	Colts Cricket Club; 87/2 (16.3 overs)
Harsha Rajapaksha 50 (57); Prabath Jayasuriya 3/30 (8 overs)		Sadeera Samarawickrama 61* (48); Mohomed Dilshad 2/18 (3 overs)

No result
Colts Cricket Club Ground, Colombo
Umpires: Susantha Dissanayake and Ruchira Palliyaguruge

- Colts Cricket Club won the toss and elected to field.
- Thaveesha Kahaduwaarachchi (Saracens Sports Club) made his List A debut.

19 December 2019
Scorecard

Sri Lanka Navy Sports Club; 89/9 (19.4 overs)	v	Kurunegala Youth Cricket Club
Nilanka Sandakan 30 (35); Shiwakumar Tyron 3/18 (4 overs)

No result
Welagedara Stadium, Kurunegala
Umpires: Gamini Dissanayake and Ranjith Vishwakula

- Kurunegala Youth Cricket Club won the toss and elected to field.
- Dananjana de Silva, Sandeep Nisansala (Kurunegala Youth Cricket Club), WP Madushan and Dilshan Lekamge (Sri Lanka Navy Sports Club) all made their List A debuts.

20 December 2019
Scorecard

Colts Cricket Club	v	Kurunegala Youth Cricket Club

Match abandoned
Colts Cricket Club Ground, Colombo
Umpires: Maurice Dela Zilva and Eric Kannangara

- No toss.
- No play was possible was due to rain.

20 December 2019
Scorecard

Panadura Sports Club	v	Saracens Sports Club

Match abandoned
Panadura Esplanade, Panadura
Umpires: Ravindra Kottahachchi and Sanjeewa Fernando

- No toss.
- No play was possible was due to rain.

20 December 2019
Scorecard

Sri Lanka Navy Sports Club	v	Bloomfield Cricket and Athletic Club

Match abandoned
Navy Ground, Welisara
Umpires: Kamal Indrajith and Nilan De Silva

- No toss.
- No play was possible was due to rain.

=== Group D ===
14 December 2019
Scorecard

Moors Sports Club	v	Nugegoda Sports and Welfare Club

Match abandoned
Moors Sports Club Ground, Colombo
Umpires: Kamal Indrajith and Asanga Jayasooriya

- No toss.
- No play was possible due to rain.

14 December 2019
Scorecard

Kalutara Town Club; 87 (27.1 overs)	v	Ragama Cricket Club; 90/3 (22.2 overs)
Eranga Rathnayake 22 (58); Udara Jayasundera 4/11 (4.1 overs)		Udara Jayasundera 44 (37); Eranga Rathnayake 1/5 (5 overs)

Ragama Cricket Club won by 7 wickets
Surrey Village Ground, Maggona
Umpires: Sisira Kumara Perera and Ravindra Kottahachchi

- Ragama Cricket Club won the toss and elected to field.
- Anushka Perera, Praveen Cooray and Mohamed Rashan (Kalutara Town Club) all made their List A debuts.

14 December 2019
Scorecard

Tamil Union Cricket and Athletic Club; 171 (44.1 overs)	v	Sri Lanka Air Force Sports Club; 159/6 (41.4 overs)
Prasansana Jayamanne 63 (124); Lasanda Rukmal 3/22 (7 overs)		SL Fernando 41 (55); Sadish Pathiranage 3/36 (10 overs)

Sri Lanka Air Force Sports Club won by 25 runs (DLS method)
P Sara Oval, Colombo
Umpires: Mohan de Silva and Kitsiri Jayaweera

- Sri Lanka Air Force Sports Club won the toss and elected to field.
- Sadish Pathiranage (Tamil Union Cricket and Athletic Club), Shabik Ifthary and Gayan de Silva (Sri Lanka Air Force Sports Club) all made their List A debuts.

15 December 2019
Scorecard

Moors Sports Club; 202/9 (32 overs)	v	Kalutara Town Club; 95/7 (24.3 overs)
Nipun Karunanayake 55 (65); Eranga Rathnayake 3/28 (7 overs)		Eranga Rathnayake 25* (36); Shiran Fernando 2/11 (2 overs)

Moors Sports Club won by 66 runs (DLS method)
Panadura Esplanade, Panadura
Umpires: Kapila Kottahachchi and Susantha Dissanayake

- Moors Sports Club won the toss and elected to bat.
- R Punchihewa (Kalutara Town Club) and Praveen Jayawickrama (Moors Sports Club) both made their List A debuts.

15 December 2019
Scorecard

Nugegoda Sports and Welfare Club; 114 (37.4 overs)	v	Tamil Union Cricket and Athletic Club; 117/8 (37.4 overs)
Irosh Samarasooriya 44 (53); Vimukthi Perera 4/24 (7.4 overs)		Maduka Liyanapathiranage 30* (55); Pasindu Madushan 4/25 (9 overs)

Tamil Union Cricket and Athletic Club won by 2 wickets
P Sara Oval, Colombo
Umpires: Nilantha Semasinghe and Lyndon Hannibal

- Tamil Union Cricket and Athletic Club won the toss and elected to field.
- Sameera Gunaratne, Poorna Wannithilake, Rahul Gunasekera (Nugegoda Sports and Welfare Club) and Kamesh Nirmal (Tamil Union Cricket and Athletic Club) all made their List A debuts.

15 December 2019
Scorecard

Ragama Cricket Club; 134 (39.5 overs)	v	Sri Lanka Air Force Sports Club; 138/3 (27.5 overs)
Janith Liyanage 40 (55); Ravindu Sembukuttige 4/19 (6.5 overs)		Udayawansha Parakrama 76* (77); Amila Aponso 1/28 (7 overs)

Sri Lanka Air Force Sports Club won by 7 wickets
FTZ Sports Complex, Katunayake
Umpires: Shantha Fonseka and Nilan De Silva

- Sri Lanka Air Force Sports Club won the toss and elected to field.

17 December 2019
Scorecard

Nugegoda Sports and Welfare Club; 139 (43 overs)	v	Kalutara Town Club; 140/5 (43.4 overs)
Pramud Hettiwatte 38 (52); Sachitha Jayathilake 3/29 (10 overs)		Anushka Perera 44 (72); Chanuk Dilshan 3/22 (10 overs)

Kalutara Town Club won by 5 wickets
Thurstan College Ground, Colombo
Umpires: Kitsiri Jayaweera and Pradeep Udawatta

- Kalutara Town Club won the toss and elected to field.
- Hashin Dilman, Inshaka Siriwardena (Kalutara Town Club), Movin Subasingha and Kalindu Senaviratna (Nugegoda Sports and Welfare Club) all made their List A debuts.

17 December 2019
Scorecard

Moors Sports Club	v	Sri Lanka Air Force Sports Club

Match abandoned
Moors Sports Club Ground, Colombo
Umpires: R P Massalage and Eric Kannangara

- No toss.
- No play was possible due to rain.

17 December 2019
Scorecard

Ragama Cricket Club; 203/9 (50 overs)	v	Tamil Union Cricket and Athletic Club; 135/3 (35 overs)
Udara Jayasundera 95 (133); Vimukthi Perera 4/42 (10 overs)		Kieran Powell 57 (68); Binura Fernando 1/13 (5 overs)

Tamil Union Cricket and Athletic Club won by 2 runs (DLS method)
P Sara Oval, Colombo
Umpires: Kamal Indrajith and Ranmore Martinesz

- Tamil Union Cricket and Athletic Club won the toss and elected to field.

19 December 2019
Scorecard

Ragama Cricket Club; 277/9 (50 overs)	v	Nugegoda Sports and Welfare Club; 176 (45 overs)
Udara Jayasundera 83 (113); Matheesha Perera 4/56 (10 overs)		Denuwan Rajakaruna 52 (66); Amila Aponso 4/30 (10 overs)

Ragama Cricket Club won by 101 runs
Surrey Village Ground, Maggona
Umpires: Sisira Kumara Perera and Hemantha Boteju

- Nugegoda Sports and Welfare Club won the toss and elected to field.

19 December 2019
Scorecard

Sri Lanka Air Force Sports Club; 239/5 (50 overs)	v	Kalutara Town Club; 148/7 (46 overs)
Madhawa Nimesh 53 (48); Ishan Abeysekara 2/31 (10 overs)		Dasun Senevirathna 41 (80); Nusky Ahmed 3/27 (10 overs)

Sri Lanka Air Force Sports Club won by 63 runs (DLS method)
Air Force Ground, Katunayake
Umpires: Shantha Fonseka and Nilan De Silva

- Kalutara Town Club won the toss and elected to field.
- Chamara Fernando, Nusky Ahmed (Sri Lanka Air Force Sports Club), Krishantha Sandaruwan and Kevin Peiris (Kalutara Town Club) all made their List A debuts.

19 December 2019
Scorecard

Moors Sports Club; 221 (46.4 overs)	v	Tamil Union Cricket and Athletic Club; 135/4 (31.2 overs)
Ramesh Mendis 63 (82); Maduka Liyanapathiranage 2/19 (7 overs)		Kieran Powell 88* (92); Sachithra Serasinghe 3/29 (7.2 overs)

Tamil Union Cricket and Athletic Club won by 12 runs (DLS method)
P Sara Oval, Colombo
Umpires: Chamara de Soysa and Lyndon Hannibal

- Tamil Union Cricket and Athletic Club won the toss and elected to field.

20 December 2019
Scorecard

Moors Sports Club	v	Ragama Cricket Club

Match abandoned
Moors Sports Club Ground, Colombo
Umpires: Vidura Prasad and Keerthi Bandara

- No toss.
- No play was possible due rain.

20 December 2019
Scorecard

Sri Lanka Air Force Sports Club	v	Nugegoda Sports and Welfare Club

Match abandoned
Air Force Ground, Katunayake
Umpires: Gamini Dissanayake and Upul Wewage

- No toss.
- No play was possible due rain.

20 December 2019
Scorecard

Tamil Union Cricket and Athletic Club	v	Kalutara Town Club

Match abandoned
P Sara Oval, Colombo
Umpires: Ranjith Vishwakula and Pradeep Udawatta

- No toss.
- No play was possible due rain.

== Quarterfinals ==
1st Quarterfinal
28 December 2019
Scorecard

Sinhalese Sports Club; 299/6 (50 overs)	v	Tamil Union Cricket and Athletic Club; 99 (24 overs)
Dimuth Karunaratne 70 (77); Sadish Pathiranage 2/29 (10 overs)		Prasansana Jayamanne 24 (33); Sachithra Senanayake 4/15 (7 overs)

Sinhalese Sports Club won by 200 runs
Nondescripts Cricket Club Ground, Colombo
Umpires: Gamini Dissanayake and Rohitha Kottahachchi

- Sinhalese Sports Club won the toss and elected to bat.

2nd Quarterfinal
28 December 2019
Scorecard

Nondescripts Cricket Club; 244/8 (50 overs)	v	Saracens Sports Club; 241/7 (50 overs)
Pathum Nissanka 78 (116); Saliya Saman 4/41 (10 overs)		Sithara Gimhan 68 (83); Sachindu Colombage 2/21 (6 overs)

Nondescripts Cricket Club won by 3 runs
Colts Cricket Club Ground, Colombo
Umpires: Ravindra Kottahachchi and Pradeep Udawatta

- Nondescripts Cricket Club won the toss and elected to bat.

3rd Quarterfinal
28 December 2019
Scorecard

Chilaw Marians Cricket Club; 315/9 (50 overs)	v	Panadura Sports Club; 185 (41.3 overs)
Sumit Ghadigaonkar 100 (108); Umesh Karunaratne 6/67 (10 overs)		Harsha Cooray 41 (74); Pulina Tharanga 4/16 (5.3 overs)

Chilaw Marians Cricket Club won by 130 runs
Singhalese Sports Club Cricket Ground, Colombo
Umpires: Kapila Kottahachchi and Asanga Jayasooriya

- Panadura Sports Club won the toss and elected to field.
- Sumit Ghadigaonkar (Chilaw Marians Cricket Club) made his List A debut.

4th Quarterfinal
28 December 2019
Scorecard

Sri Lanka Air Force Sports Club; 206/8 (50 overs)	v	Sri Lanka Army Sports Club; 207/5 (44.3 overs)
Suminda Lakshan 63 (89); Heshan Hettiarchchi 3/47 (9 overs)		Dinesh Chandimal 67* (69); Suminda Lakshan 2/42 (10 overs)

Sri Lanka Army Sports Club won by 5 wickets
FTZ Sports Complex, Katunayake
Umpires: Nilan De Silva and Keerthi Bandara

- Sri Lanka Army Sports Club won the toss and elected to field.
- Ashintha Malshan (Sri Lanka Air Force Sports Club) and Gihan Koralage (Sri Lanka Army Sports Club) both made their List A debuts.

== Finals ==
1st Semi-final
29 December 2019
Scorecard

Sinhalese Sports Club; 277/8 (50 overs)	v	Chilaw Marians Cricket Club; 279/7 (46.4 overs)
Sachithra Senanayake 86 (88); Shehan Jayasuriya 2/20 (6 overs)		Sumit Ghadigaonkar 99 (111); Dhammika Prasad 3/62 (9 overs)

Chilaw Marians Cricket Club won by 3 wickets
FTZ Sports Complex, Katunayake
Umpires: Ranmore Martinesz and Gamini Dissanayake

- Chilaw Marians Cricket Club won the toss and elected to field.

2nd Semi-final
29 December 2019
Scorecard

Nondescripts Cricket Club; 194 (49.3 overs)	v	Sri Lanka Army Sports Club; 172 (42.1 overs)
Sahan Arachchige 56 (83); Janith Silva 3/20 (8 overs)		Dinesh Chandimal 91 (109); Dilesh Gunaratne 3/18 (8.1 overs)

Nondescripts Cricket Club won by 22 runs
Sinhalese Sports Club Ground, Colombo
Umpires: Hemantha Boteju and Raveendra Wimalasiri

- Nondescripts Cricket Club won the toss and elected to bat.

Final
31 December 2019
Scorecard

Chilaw Marians Cricket Club; 295/8 (50 overs)	v	Nondescripts Cricket Club; 204 (43.3 overs)
Sumit Ghadigaonkar 79 (77); Chamika Gunasekara 2/67 (8 overs)		Lahiru Udara 50 (49); Kamindu Mendis 3/32 (7.3 overs)

Chilaw Marians Cricket Club won by 91 runs
Sinhalese Sports Club Ground, Colombo
Umpires: Lyndon Hannibal and Ruchira Palliyaguruge

- Nondescripts Cricket Club won the toss and elected to field
