= 2019–20 SLC Twenty20 Tournament =

Cricket tournament

- Dates: 4 – 21 January 2020
- Administrator(s): Sri Lanka Cricket
- Cricket format: Twenty20
- Tournament format(s): Round-robin then knockout
- Host(s): Sri Lanka
- Champions: Colombo Cricket Club
- Runners-up: Chilaw Marians Cricket Club
- Participants: 26
- Matches: 79
- Most runs: Shehan Jayasuriya (385)
- Most wickets: Malinda Pushpakumara (18)

The 2019–20 SLC Twenty20 Tournament was a Twenty20 cricket tournament that was held in Sri Lanka. It was played between twenty-six domestic teams in Sri Lanka, with the tournament running from 4 to 21 January 2020. Moors Sports Club were the defending champions.

On the opening day of the tournament, Shehan Jayasuriya scored a century for Chilaw Marians Cricket Club and Mohomed Dilshad took a five-wicket haul for Saracens Sports Club. On the third day, Ashen Bandara scored a century for Saracens Sports Club and Asitha Fernando took six wickets for eight runs for Chilaw Marians Cricket Club. Day five saw Irosh Samarasooriya score an unbeaten 108 from 59 balls for Nugegoda Sports and Welfare Club. The match between Police Sports Club and Sinhalese Sports Club finished as a tie, but no Super Over was played.

Following the conclusion of the group stage, Badureliya Sports Club, Colombo Cricket Club, Nondescripts Cricket Club, Sri Lanka Army Sports Club, Chilaw Marians Cricket Club, Sinhalese Sports Club, Ragama Cricket Club and Colts Cricket Club had all qualified for the quarterfinals. Colombo, Ragama, Chilaw Marians and Nondescripts all won their respective matches to advance to the semi-finals of the tournament. Chilaw Marians won the first semi-final, against Ragama, by 33 runs, and Colombo beat Nondescripts by 10 runs in the second semi-final.

Colombo Cricket Club won the tournament, after they beat Chilaw Marians Cricket Club by four wickets in the final, with the winning runs coming from the final ball of the match.

== Group stage ==
=== Group A ===
4 January 2020
Scorecard

Colts Cricket Club; 175/7 (20 overs)	v	Panadura Sports Club; 143/9 (20 overs)
Sadeera Samarawickrama 73 (57); Minhaj Jalill 3/29 (4 overs)		Minhaj Jalill 56 (40); Akila Dananjaya 4/28 (4 overs)

Colts Cricket Club won by 32 runs
Nondescripts Cricket Club Ground, Colombo
Umpires: Susantha Dissanayake and Keerthi Bandara

- Panadura Sports Club won the toss and elected to field.

4 January 2020
Scorecard

Bloomfield Cricket and Athletic Club; 138/7 (20 overs)	v	Moors Sports Club; 143/3 (16 overs)
Revan Kelly 40 (39); Nimanda Madushanka 4/22 (4 overs)		Pabasara Waduge 62* (47); Chathura Obeyesekere 2/25 (3 overs)

Moors Sports Club won by 7 wickets
P Sara Oval, Colombo
Umpires: Rohitha Kottahachchi and Deepal Gunawardene

- Moors Sports Club won the toss and elected to field.
- Praveen Jayawickrama (Moors Sports Club) and Nimantha Perera (Bloomfield Cricket and Athletic Club) both made their T20 debuts.

4 January 2020
Scorecard

Badureliya Sports Club; 155/9 (20 overs)	v	Galle Cricket Club; 131 (19.4 overs)
Damith Perera 39 (37); Mansoor Amjad 4/18 (4 overs)		Mansoor Amjad 52* (52); Buddika Sanjeewa 3/24 (2.4 overs)

Badureliya Sports Club won by 24 runs
P Sara Oval, Colombo
Umpires: Rohitha Kottahachchi and Deepal Gunawardene

- Badureliya Sports Club won the toss and elected to bat.
- Kavindu Ediriweera, Nuwan Priyadarshana (Galle Cricket Club) and Kosala Ravindu (Badureliya Sports Club) all made their T20 debuts.

6 January 2020
Scorecard

Colts Cricket Club; 127/8 (20 overs)	v	Badureliya Sports Club; 122/6 (20 overs)
Jehan Daniel 34* (22); Shehan Madushanka 2/23 (4 overs)		Lahiru Milantha 39 (36); Prabath Jayasuriya 2/15 (4 overs)

Colts Cricket Club won by 5 runs
Tyronne Fernando Stadium, Moratuwa
Umpires: Sisira Kumara Perera and Ravindra Kottahachchi

- Colts Cricket Club won the toss and elected to bat.

6 January 2020
Scorecard

Moors Sports Club; 154 (19.5 overs)	v	Unichela Sports Club; 63 (18.5 overs)
Ayana Siriwardhana 35 (17); Ishara Amerasinghe 3/30 (4 overs)		Dhanushka Ranasinghe 14 (16); Kavishka Anjula 3/14 (2.5 overs)

Moors Sports Club won by 91 runs
Burgher Recreation Club Ground, Colombo
Umpires: Ranmore Martinesz and Deepal Gunawardene

- Moors Sports Club won the toss and elected to bat.
- Suhanga Wijewardana, Ushantha Perera, Chanuka Bandara, Nishan Thilanka, Lasindu Arosha, Kavindu Bandara, Dhanushka Ranasinghe and Danushka Madushanka (Unichela Sports Club) all made their T20 debuts.

6 January 2020
Scorecard

Bloomfield Cricket and Athletic Club; 149/7 (20 overs)	v	Galle Cricket Club; 147 (20 overs)
Nipuna Gamage 41 (34); Chathura Lakshan 2/24 (4 overs)		Ravishka Wijesiri 33 (18); Gayan Sirisoma 3/23 (4 overs)

Bloomfield Cricket and Athletic Club won by 2 runs
Burgher Recreation Club Ground, Colombo
Umpires: Ranmore Martinesz and Deepal Gunawardene

- Galle Cricket Club won the toss and elected to field.
- Vinura Dulsara, Azlan Samsudeen (Galle Cricket Club) and Tariq Saboor (Bloomfield Cricket and Athletic Club) all made their T20 debuts.

8 January 2020
Scorecard

Panadura Sports Club; 127/7 (20 overs)	v	Galle Cricket Club; 128/5 (19.1 overs)
Sanjika Ridma 38 (34); Mithun Jayawickrama 2/22 (4 overs)		Nimesh Perera 66* (41); Nipun Lakshan 1/21 (3 overs)

Galle Cricket Club won by 5 wickets
Burgher Recreation Club Ground, Colombo
Umpires: Rohitha Kottahachchi and R P Massalage

- Panadura Sports Club won the toss and elected to bat.
- Thisara Dilshan (Galle Cricket Club) and Janindu Inuwara (Panadura Sports Club) both made their T20 debuts.

8 January 2020
Scorecard

Unichela Sports Club; 63 (19.3 overs)	v	Colts Cricket Club; 64/5 (19 overs)
Dulith Gayan 11 (13); Prabath Jayasuriya 2/7 (4 overs)		Sangeeth Cooray 21 (28); Dhanushka Ranasinghe 2/11 (3 overs)

Colts Cricket Club won by 5 wickets
P Sara Oval, Colombo
Umpires: Chamara de Soysa and Gamini Dissanayake

- Colts Cricket Club won the toss and elected to field.
- Dulith Gayan and Lahiru Silva (Unichela Sports Club) both made their T20 debuts.

8 January 2020
Scorecard

Badureliya Sports Club; 158 (20 overs)	v	Moors Sports Club; 112 (18.1 overs)
Dushan Hemantha 33 (20); Ramesh Mendis 4/17 (4 overs)		Charitha Kumarasinghe 53 (36); Buddika Sanjeewa 3/27 (3.1 overs)

Badureliya Sports Club won by 46 runs
Burgher Recreation Club Ground, Colombo
Umpires: Rohitha Kottahachchi and R P Massalage

- Moors Sports Club won the toss and elected to field.

10 January 2020
Scorecard

Panadura Sports Club; 88 (19.5 overs)	v	Moors Sports Club; 92/4 (15.3 overs)
Sanjika Ridma 18 (19); Anuk Fernando 3/18 (4 overs)		Pabasara Waduge 27 (31); Azhar Attari 2/16 (4 overs)

Moors Sports Club won by 6 wickets
Colombo Cricket Club Ground, Colombo
Umpires: Ravindra Kottahachchi and Chaturan Sanjeewa

- Panadura Sports Club won the toss and elected to bat.
- Lahiru Attanayake (Moors Sports Club) and Vimukthi Kulatunga (Panadura Sports Club) both made their T20 debuts.

10 January 2020
Scorecard

Colts Cricket Club; 165/6 (20 overs)	v	Bloomfield Cricket and Athletic Club; 131 (19.5 overs)
Sadeera Samarawickrama 89 (56); Gayan Sirisoma 3/31 (4 overs)		Nipuna Gamage 54 (35); Prabath Jayasuriya 3/25 (4 overs)

Colts Cricket Club won by 34 runs
FTZ Sports Complex, Katunayake
Umpires: Thilak Fernando and Keerthi Bandara

- Colts Cricket Club won the toss and elected to bat.

10 January 2020
Scorecard

Unichela Sports Club; 95/9 (20 overs)	v	Galle Cricket Club; 99/9 (19.3 overs)
Hasitha Nirmal 31 (37); Mansoor Amjad 3/20 (4 overs)		Mithun Jayawickrama 16 (13); Dhanushka Ranasinghe 3/24 (4 overs)

Galle Cricket Club won by 1 wicket
Colombo Cricket Club Ground, Colombo
Umpires: Ravindra Kottahachchi and Chaturan Sanjeewa

- Unichela Sports Club won the toss and elected to bat.
- Pasindu Dilshan (Galle Cricket Club) and Nuwan Chanaka (Unichela Sports Club) both made their T20 debuts.

12 January 2020
Scorecard

Moors Sports Club; 108 (18.3 overs)	v	Colts Cricket Club; 103 (19.1 overs)
Adeesha Thilanchana 37 (45); Akila Dananjaya 3/11 (3 overs)		Avishka Fernando 43 (44); Praveen Jayawickrama 3/14 (4 overs)

Moors Sports Club won by 5 runs
Colombo Cricket Club Ground, Colombo
Umpires: Kamal Indrajith and Kapila Kottahachchi

- Moors Sports Club won the toss and elected to bat.

12 January 2020
Scorecard

Bloomfield Cricket and Athletic Club; 133/8 (20 overs)	v	Unichela Sports Club; 104 (19.4 overs)
Harsha Vithana 47* (41); Kavindu Bandara 2/17 (4 overs)		Nuwan Chanaka 35 (41); Gayan Sirisoma 3/11 (4 overs)

Bloomfield Cricket and Athletic Club won by 29 runs
FTZ Sports Complex, Katunayake
Umpires: Ranmore Martinesz and Nilantha Semasinghe

- Bloomfield Cricket and Athletic Club won the toss and elected to bat.
- Kanishka Uggalpaya (Bloomfield Cricket and Athletic Club) made his T20 debut.

12 January 2020
Scorecard

Badureliya Sports Club; 161/6 (20 overs)	v	Panadura Sports Club; 155/3 (20 overs)
Lahiru Samarakoon 66 (42); Chalana de Silva 2/21 (4 overs)		Harsha Cooray 56* (48); Alankara Asanka Silva 2/4 (2 overs)

Badureliya Sports Club won by 6 runs
Colombo Cricket Club Ground, Colombo
Umpires: Kamal Indrajith and Kapila Kottahachchi

- Badureliya Sports Club won the toss and elected to bat.
- Kaumal Nanayakkara (Panadura Sports Club) made his T20 debut.

14 January 2020
Scorecard

Bloomfield Cricket and Athletic Club; 136/4 (20 overs)	v	Panadura Sports Club; 137/8 (19.5 overs)
Chamara Silva 58 (46); Azhar Attari 2/16 (4 overs)		Minhaj Jalill 47 (29); Thilan Thushara 3/13 (3.5 overs)

Panadura Sports Club won by 2 wickets
FTZ Sports Complex, Katunayake
Umpires: Pradeep Udawatta and Nilan De Silva

- Bloomfield Cricket and Athletic Club won the toss and elected to bat.

14 January 2020
Scorecard

Unichela Sports Club; 78/9 (20 overs)	v	Badureliya Sports Club; 84/3 (7.5 overs)
Hasitha Nirmal 23 (25); Malith de Silva 4/18 (4 overs)		Lahiru Milantha 29* (14); Dunil Abeydeera 1/13 (2 overs)

Badureliya Sports Club won by 7 wickets
FTZ Sports Complex, Katunayake
Umpires: Deepal Gunawardene and Keerthi Bandara

- Unichela Sports Club won the toss and elected to bat.
- Sandun Fernando (Unichela Sports Club) made his T20 debut.

14 January 2020
Scorecard

Galle Cricket Club; 130/7 (20 overs)	v	Moors Sports Club; 131/5 (18.5 overs)
Nimesh Perera 33 (27); Nimanda Madushanka 2/19 (4 overs)		Ramesh Mendis 72* (42)

Moors Sports Club won by 5 wickets
Tyronne Fernando Stadium, Moratuwa
Umpires: Ravindra Kottahachchi and Asanga Jayasooriya

- Galle Cricket Club won the toss and elected to bat.
- Abid Hasan (Galle Cricket Club) made his T20 debut.

15 January 2020
Scorecard

Unichela Sports Club; 102/8 (20 overs)	v	Panadura Sports Club; 106/7 (19 overs)
Hasitha Nirmal 53* (45); Kaumal Nanayakkara 3/12 (4 overs)		Gimandu Malcom 36 (47); Nuwan Chanaka 3/9 (2 overs)

Panadura Sports Club won by 3 wickets
FTZ Sports Complex, Katunayake
Umpires: Hemantha Boteju and Deepal Gunawardene

- Unichela Sports Club won the toss and elected to bat.
- Hasitha Perera, Gimandu Malcom, Sasanka Nirmal (Panadura Sports Club), Anju Karunanayake and Rathsara Vithana (Unichela Sports Club) all made their T20 debuts.

15 January 2020
Scorecard

Badureliya Sports Club; 207/6 (20 overs)	v	Bloomfield Cricket and Athletic Club; 106 (15.3 overs)
Tillakaratne Sampath 79* (48); Dileepa Jayalath 2/22 (4 overs)		Nipuna Gamage 21 (12); Lahiru Samarakoon 3/19 (3 overs)

Badureliya Sports Club won by 101 runs
FTZ Sports Complex, Katunayake
Umpires: Hemantha Boteju and Deepal Gunawardene

- Bloomfield Cricket and Athletic Club won the toss and elected to field.

15 January 2020
Scorecard

Colts Cricket Club; 206/7 (20 overs)	v	Galle Cricket Club; 106/8 (20 overs)
Vishad Randika 51* (23); Saranga Rajaguru 3/29 (4 overs)		Chathura Lakshan 31* (38); Nipun Ransika 3/13 (3 overs)

Colts Cricket Club won by 100 runs
Burgher Recreation Club Ground, Colombo
Umpires: Kapila Kottahachchi and Pradeep Udawatta

- Colts Cricket Club won the toss and elected to bat.
- Chamod Wickramasuriya (Galle Cricket Club) made his T20 debut.

=== Group B ===
4 January 2020
Scorecard

Tamil Union Cricket and Athletic Club; 153/5 (20 overs)	v	Sri Lanka Navy Sports Club; 98/7 (20 overs)
Ranmith Jayasena 33* (15); Buddika Madushan 2/20 (4 overs)		Savindu Peiris 23* (24); Ramith Rambukwella 2/9 (3 overs)

Tamil Union Cricket and Athletic Club won by 55 runs
Colombo Cricket Club Ground, Colombo
Umpires: Asanga Jayasooriya and Raveendra Wimalasiri

- Sri Lanka Navy Sports Club won the toss and elected to field.
- Kamesh Nirmal, Ranmith Jayasena (Tamil Union Cricket and Athletic Club), WP Madushan, Samitha Ranga, Savindu Peiris and Sudara Dakshina (Sri Lanka Navy Sports Club) all made their T20 debuts.

4 January 2020
Scorecard

Nondescripts Cricket Club; 234/3 (20 overs)	v	Police Sports Club; 111 (17 overs)
Lahiru Udara 82 (44); Nisar Ahmad 1/28 (4 overs)		Lakshan Rodrigo 51 (32); Ravindu Tillakaratne 3/14 (4 overs)

Nondescripts Cricket Club won by 123 runs
Nondescripts Cricket Club Ground, Colombo
Umpires: Susantha Dissanayake and Keerthi Bandara

- Nondescripts Cricket Club won the toss and elected to bat.
- Chamika Gunasekara, Lasith Embuldeniya (Nondescripts Cricket Club), Malith de Silva, Nisar Ahmad, Inosha Gunawardene (Police Sports Club) all made their T20 debuts.

4 January 2020
Scorecard

Sinhalese Sports Club; 130 (19.4 overs)	v	Saracens Sports Club; 121 (20 overs)
Shammu Ashan 32 (23); Mohomed Dilshad 5/21 (3.4 overs)		Harsha Rajapaksha 39 (22); Sachithra Senanayake 3/18 (4 overs)

Sinhalese Sports Club won by 9 runs
Colombo Cricket Club Ground, Colombo
Umpires: Asanga Jayasooriya and Raveendra Wimalasiri

- Sinhalese Sports Club won the toss and elected to bat.
- Chandula Waliwitha (Saracens Sports Club), Pasindu Sooriyabandara and Kalana Perera (Sinhalese Sports Club) all made their T20 debuts.

6 January 2020
Scorecard

Tamil Union Cricket and Athletic Club; 121 (18.3 overs)	v	Sinhalese Sports Club; 124/2 (16.3 overs)
Kamesh Nirmal 39 (27); Tharindu Ratnayake 2/14 (2 overs)		Krishan Sanjula 51* (41); Vimukthi Perera 1/16 (3 overs)

Sinhalese Sports Club won by 8 wickets
Colts Cricket Club Ground, Colombo
Umpires: Hemantha Boteju and Maurice Dela Zilva

- Tamil Union Cricket and Athletic Club won the toss and elected to bat.

6 January 2020
Scorecard

Sri Lanka Navy Sports Club; 88 (19.2 overs)	v	Nondescripts Cricket Club; 91/7 (16.4 overs)
Samitha Ranga 25 (40); Sachindu Colombage 3/24 (4 overs)		Mahela Udawatte 31 (22); Sudara Dakshina 2/17 (3.4 overs)

Nondescripts Cricket Club won by 3 wickets
Tyronne Fernando Stadium, Moratuwa
Umpires: Sisira Kumara Perera and Ravindra Kottahachchi

- Sri Lanka Navy Sports Club won the toss and elected to bat.
- W Mayantha, Vimud Sapnaka and Suranga Paranavitana (Sri Lanka Navy Sports Club) all made their T20 debuts.

6 January 2020
Scorecard

Saracens Sports Club; 192/5 (20 overs)	v	Police Sports Club; 123 (18.2 overs)
Milinda Siriwardana 72 (41); Nisar Ahmad 2/53 (4 overs)		Lakshan Rodrigo 26 (19); Saliya Saman 4/21 (3.2 overs)

Saracens Sports Club won by 69 runs
Colts Cricket Club Ground, Colombo
Umpires: Hemantha Boteju and Maurice Dela Zilva

- Police Sports Club won the toss and elected to field.
- Sujan Mayura (Police Sports Club) made his T20 debut.

8 January 2020
Scorecard

Sinhalese Sports Club; 122/9 (20 overs)	v	Nondescripts Cricket Club; 123/3 (18.5 overs)
Sachithra Senanayake 39 (25); Sachintha Peiris 2/13 (4 overs)		Mahela Udawatte 69* (57); Himesh Ramanayake 1/12 (3 overs)

Nondescripts Cricket Club won by 7 wickets
P Sara Oval, Colombo
Umpires: Chamara de Soysa and Gamini Dissanayake

- Sinhalese Sports Club won the toss and elected to bat.

8 January 2020
Scorecard

Police Sports Club; 172/4 (20 overs)	v	Sri Lanka Navy Sports Club; 111 (19 overs)
Maduranga Zoysa 68* (54); Savindu Peiris 2/31 (4 overs)		Samitha Ranga 25 (29); Supun Madushanka 3/15 (4 overs)

Police Sports Club won by 61 runs
FTZ Sports Complex, Katunayake
Umpires: Mohan de Silva and Nilan De Silva

- Police Sports Club won the toss and elected to bat.
- Chatura Jayanath (Police Sports Club) made his T20 debut.

8 January 2020
Scorecard

Saracens Sports Club; 190/5 (20 overs)	v	Tamil Union Cricket and Athletic Club; 185/8 (20 overs)
Ashen Bandara 101* (65); Vimukthi Perera 2/30 (4 overs)		Manoj Sarathchandra 54 (25); Saliya Saman 3/33 (4 overs)

Saracens Sports Club won by 5 runs
FTZ Sports Complex, Katunayake
Umpires: Mohan de Silva and Nilan De Silva

- Tamil Union Cricket and Athletic Club won the toss and elected to field.
- Pathum Madusanka (Saracens Sports Club) made his T20 debut.

10 January 2020
Scorecard

Nondescripts Cricket Club; 188/3 (20 overs)	v	Saracens Sports Club; 178/9 (20 overs)
Pathum Nissanka 93 (61); Raveen Sayer 1/22 (4 overs)		Milinda Siriwardana 90 (37); Chaturanga de Silva 3/33 (4 overs)

Nondescripts Cricket Club won by 10 runs
FTZ Sports Complex, Katunayake
Umpires: Thilak Fernando and Keerthi Bandara

- Nondescripts Cricket Club won the toss and elected to bat.

10 January 2020
Scorecard

Tamil Union Cricket and Athletic Club; 154/9 (20 overs)	v	Police Sports Club; 159/8 (19.4 overs)
Ramith Rambukwella 49 (25); Supun Madushanka 2/19 (4 overs)		Sujan Mayura 54 (40); Thilanga Udeshana 4/34 (4 overs)

Police Sports Club won by 2 wickets
Burgher Recreation Club Ground, Colombo
Umpires: Ranmore Martinesz and Niroshana Amarasinghe

- Police Sports Club won the toss and elected to field.
- Tamara Weerasuriya, Mohammed Faheem (Police Sports Club) and Dhakshitha Fernando (Tamil Union Cricket and Athletic Club) all made their T20 debuts.

10 January 2020
Scorecard

Sri Lanka Navy Sports Club; 106/9 (20 overs)	v	Sinhalese Sports Club; 110/3 (16.2 overs)
Vimud Sapnaka 24 (39); Himesh Ramanayake 3/15 (3) overs		Krishan Sanjula 48 (34); Dilanka Auwardt 2/15 (3.2 overs)

Sinhalese Sports Club won by 7 wickets
Burgher Recreation Club Ground, Colombo
Umpires: Ranmore Martinesz and Niroshana Amarasinghe

- Sinhalese Sports Club won the toss and elected to field.
- Ashan Lokukatiya, Roshan Athukorala and Praneeth Dias (Sri Lanka Navy Sports Club) all made their T20 debuts.

12 January 2020
Scorecard

Tamil Union Cricket and Athletic Club; 130/8 (20 overs)	v	Nondescripts Cricket Club; 135/4 (15.4 overs)
Dhakshitha Fernando 65* (57); Sachindu Colombage 2/31 (4 overs)		Pathum Nissanka 60 (42); Pramod Madushan 2/27 (4 overs)

Nondescripts Cricket Club won by 6 wickets
FTZ Sports Complex, Katunayake
Umpires: Ranmore Martinesz and Nilantha Semasinghe

- Tamil Union Cricket and Athletic Club won the toss and elected to bat.
- Yohan Mendis (Tamil Union Cricket and Athletic Club) made his T20 debut.

12 January 2020
Scorecard

Sri Lanka Navy Sports Club; 129/9 (20 overs)	v	Saracens Sports Club; 134/4 (13.2 overs)
Buddika Madushan 40 (37); Raveen Sayer 2/22 (3.4 overs)		Sithara Gimhan 59 (33); Suranga Paranavitana 2/7 (2 overs)

Saracens Sports Club won by 6 wickets
Burgher Recreation Club Ground, Colombo
Umpires: Sisira Kumara Perera and Hemantha Boteju

- Sri Lanka Navy Sports Club won the toss and elected to bat.
- Promod Maduwantha (Saracens Sports Club) and Dilshan Lekamge (Sri Lanka Navy Sports Club) both made their T20 debuts.

12 January 2020
Scorecard

Police Sports Club; 166/8 (20 overs)	v	Sinhalese Sports Club; 166/9 (20 overs)
Supun Madushanka 54 (28); Himesh Ramanayake 2/15 (4 overs)		Charith Asalanka 64 (46); Mohammed Faheem 3/35 (4 overs)

Match tied
Burgher Recreation Club Ground, Colombo
Umpires: Sisira Kumara Perera and Hemantha Boteju

- Sinhalese Sports Club won the toss and elected to field.
- Janaka Rathnayake (Police Sports Club) made his T20 debut.

=== Group C ===
4 January 2020
Scorecard

Negombo Cricket Club; 118 (19.5 overs)	v	Sri Lanka Air Force Sports Club; 119/6 (19.4 overs)
Dilshan Munaweera 33 (24); Sanjaya Ranaweera 3/33 (3.5 overs)		Chamara Fernando 44 (36); Madawa Warnapura 2/11 (3 overs)

Sri Lanka Air Force Sports Club won by 4 wickets
Colts Cricket Club Ground, Colombo
Umpires: Hemantha Boteju and Kapila Kottahachchi

- Sri Lanka Air Force Sports Club won the toss and elected to field.
- Chathuranga Rajapaksa, Sheshan Fernando, Lakshitha Manasinghe (Negombo Cricket Club), Chamara Fernando, Shabik Ifthary, Pramodh Kumara and Rashindra Silva (Sri Lanka Air Force Sports Club) all made their T20 debuts.

4 January 2020
Scorecard

Sri Lanka Army Sports Club; 111/9 (20 overs)	v	Kalutara Town Club; 113/4 (19.3 overs)
Ashan Randika 33 (29); Inshaka Siriwardena 3/15 (4 overs)		Dasun Senevirathna 34 (21); Dushan Vimukthi 2/20 (4 overs)

Kalutara Town Club won by 6 wickets
Sinhalese Sports Club Ground, Colombo
Umpires: Ravindra Kottahachchi and Pradeep Udawatta

- Kalutara Town Club won the toss and elected to field.
- Gihan Koralage, Lahiru Wijetunga (Sri Lanka Army Sports Club), TLK Thambavita, Anushka Perera, Inshaka Siriwardena, Mohamed Rashan and Ramesh Selvaraj (Kalutara Town Club) all made their T20 debuts.

4 January 2020
Scorecard

Chilaw Marians Cricket Club; 244/2 (20 overs)	v	Kurunegala Youth Cricket Club; 117/7 (20 overs)
Shehan Jayasuriya 107 (46); Navin Kavikara 2/51 (4 overs)		Malinga Maligaspe 30 (39); Nimesh Vimukthi 4/27 (4 overs)

Chilaw Marians Cricket Club won by 127 runs
Sinhalese Sports Club Ground, Colombo
Umpires: Ravindra Kottahachchi and Pradeep Udawatta

- Chilaw Marians Cricket Club won the toss and elected to bat.
- Avindu Theekshana and Sanjeewan Priyadharshana (Kurunegala Youth Cricket Club) both made their T20 debuts.

6 January 2020
Scorecard

Chilaw Marians Cricket Club; 191/8 (20 overs)	v	Sri Lanka Air Force Sports Club; 157/8 (20 overs)
Shehan Jayasuriya 54 (32); Sanjaya Ranaweera 3/35 (4 overs)		Udayawansha Parakrama 47 (31); Thikshila de Silva 5/30 (4 overs)

Chilaw Marians Cricket Club won by 34 runs
P Sara Oval, Colombo
Umpires: Gamini Dissanayake and Saman Mohan de Silva

- Sri Lanka Air Force Sports Club won the toss and elected to field.

6 January 2020
Scorecard

Kalutara Town Club; 103 (17.4 overs)	v	Negombo Cricket Club; 106/2 (15.2 overs)
Anushka Perera 38 (34); Upul Indrasiri 3/19 (4 overs)		Madawa Warnapura 44* (40); Sachitha Jayathilake 1/18 (4 overs)

Negombo Cricket Club won by 8 wickets
FTZ Sports Complex, Katunayake
Umpires: Kamal Indrajith and Asanga Jayasooriya

- Negombo Cricket Club won the toss and elected to field.

6 January 2020
Scorecard

Sri Lanka Army Sports Club; 149 (20 overs)	v	Kurunegala Youth Cricket Club; 96 (16.1 overs)
Ashan Randika 57 (33); Navin Kavikara 4/16 (4 overs)		Aravinda Akurugoda 45 (38); Dushan Vimukthi 3/29 (4 overs)

Sri Lanka Army Sports Club won by 53 runs
P Sara Oval, Colombo
Umpires: Gamini Dissanayake and Saman Mohan de Silva

- Kurunegala Youth Cricket Club won the toss and elected to field.
- Hansha Pramodya (Sri Lanka Army Sports Club), Kalindu Siriwardana, Shiwakumar Tyron and Dananjana de Silva (Kurunegala Youth Cricket Club) all made their T20 debuts.

8 January 2020
Scorecard

Chilaw Marians Cricket Club; 133/7 (20 overs)	v	Negombo Cricket Club; 95 (19 overs)
Pulina Tharanga 47* (47); Madawa Warnapura 2/13 (4 overs)		Pasindu Lakshanka 40 (40); Asitha Fernando 6/8 (4 overs)

Chilaw Marians Cricket Club won by 38 runs
Colombo Cricket Club Ground, Colombo
Umpires: Ranmore Martinesz and Ranganath Prasanna

- Chilaw Marians Cricket Club won the toss and elected to bat.

8 January 2020
Scorecard

Kurunegala Youth Cricket Club; 124/6 (20 overs)	v	Kalutara Town Club; 125/5 (18.4 overs)
Tharinda Wijesinghe 39* (35); Inshaka Siriwardena 2/17 (4 overs)		Anushka Perera 48 (44); Navin Kavikara 1/22 (4 overs)

Kalutara Town Club won by 5 wickets
Nondescripts Cricket Club Ground, Colombo
Umpires: Sanjeewa Fernando and Keerthi Bandara

- Kurunegala Youth Cricket Club won the toss and elected to bat.

8 January 2020
Scorecard

Sri Lanka Army Sports Club; 152 (19.2 overs)	v	Sri Lanka Air Force Sports Club; 120 (20 overs)
Dinesh Chandimal 51 (25); Lasanda Rukmal 5/31 (3.2 overs)		Chamara Fernando 45 (38); Thulina Dilshan 3/3 (2 overs)

Sri Lanka Army Sports Club won by 32 runs
Colombo Cricket Club Ground, Colombo
Umpires: Ranmore Martinesz and Ranganath Prasanna

- Sri Lanka Air Force Sports Club won the toss and elected to field.
- Kanishka Madhushanka, Asanka Lakshan (Sri Lanka Air Force Sports Club), Thulina Dilshan and Mahesh Kumara (Sri Lanka Army Sports Club) all made their T20 debuts.

10 January 2020
Scorecard

Chilaw Marians Cricket Club; 124 (20 overs)	v	Kalutara Town Club; 89 (18.5 overs)
Pulina Tharanga 25 (18); Ishan Abeysekara 3/22 (4 overs)		Inshaka Siriwardena 35 (31); Asitha Fernando 4/13 (3.5 overs)

Chilaw Marians Cricket Club won by 35 runs
Colts Cricket Club Ground, Colombo
Umpires: Krishantha Rodrigo and Deepal Gunawardene

- Chilaw Marians Cricket Club won the toss and elected to bat.
- Hashin Dilman (Kalutara Town Club) made his T20 debut.

10 January 2020
Scorecard

Kurunegala Youth Cricket Club; 156/9 (20 overs)	v	Sri Lanka Air Force Sports Club; 159/5 (19.3 overs)
Dilshan Kollure 75 (52); Sanjaya Ranaweera 2/31 (4 overs)		Shabik Ifthary 43 (32); Navin Kavikara 2/26 (4 overs)

Sri Lanka Air Force Sports Club won by 5 wickets
Sinhalese Sports Club Ground, Colombo
Umpires: Rohitha Kottahachchi and Eric Kannangara

- Sri Lanka Air Force Sports Club won the toss and elected to field.
- Hashan Vimukthi, Navod Madushanka Weeratunga (Sri Lanka Air Force Sports Club) and Dilshan Kollure (Kurunegala Youth Cricket Club) all made their T20 debuts.

10 January 2020
Scorecard

Negombo Cricket Club; 130/7 (20 overs)	v	Sri Lanka Army Sports Club; 131/5 (18.2 overs)
Madawa Warnapura 33 (31); Janaka Sampath 2/14 (4 overs)		Dinesh Chandimal 51 (36); Danushka Sandaruwan 2/19 (4 overs)

Sri Lanka Army Sports Club won by 5 wickets
Colts Cricket Club Ground, Colombo
Umpires: Krishantha Rodrigo and Deepal Gunawardene

- Negombo Cricket Club won the toss and elected to bat.
- Danushka Sandaruwan (Negombo Cricket Club) made his T20 debut.

12 January 2020
Scorecard

Sri Lanka Army Sports Club; 180/7 (20 overs)	v	Chilaw Marians Cricket Club; 149 (18.1 overs)
Thulina Dilshan 53 (31); Asitha Fernando 2/32 (4 overs)		Shehan Jayasuriya 72 (45); Janith Silva 5/23 (4 overs)

Sri Lanka Army Sports Club won by 31 runs
Surrey Village Ground, Maggona
Umpires: Maurice Dela Zilva and Nilan De Silva

- Chilaw Marians Cricket Club won the toss and elected to field.
- Shihan de Silva (Sri Lanka Army Sports Club) made his T20 debut.

12 January 2020
Scorecard

Sri Lanka Air Force Sports Club; 108 (20 overs)	v	Kalutara Town Club; 70/9 (20 overs)
Chamara Fernando 22 (18); Sachitha Jayathilake 2/15 (4 overs)		Eranga Rathnayake 28* (36); Sanjaya Ranaweera 3/11 (4 overs)

Sri Lanka Air Force Sports Club won by 38 runs
Sinhalese Sports Club Ground, Colombo
Umpires: Gamini Dissanayake and Ranjith Vishwakula

- Kalutara Town Club won the toss and elected to field.
- S Priyamal (Sri Lanka Air Force Sports Club) and Samyag Silva (Kalutara Town Club) both made their T20 debuts.

12 January 2020
Scorecard

Negombo Cricket Club; 169/5 (20 overs)	v	Kurunegala Youth Cricket Club; 152/9 (20 overs)
Dilshan Munaweera 55 (40); Randeera Ranasinghe 2/33 (4 overs)		Kalindu Siriwardana 43 (34); Dilshan Munaweera 4/35 (4 overs)

Negombo Cricket Club won by 17 runs
Surrey Village Ground, Maggona
Umpires: Maurice Dela Zilva and Nilan De Silva

- Negombo Cricket Club won the toss and elected to bat.
- Dineth Chandimal (Kurunegala Youth Cricket Club) made his T20 debut.

=== Group D ===
4 January 2020
Scorecard

Burgher Recreation Club; 177/6 (20 overs)	v	Lankan Cricket Club; 141/9 (20 overs)
Lasith Lakshan 51 (45); Damitha Silva 2/12 (2 overs)		Primosh Perera 32 (23); Tharindu Kaushal 3/13 (4 overs)

Burgher Recreation Club won by 36 runs
FTZ Sports Complex, Katunayake
Umpires: Gamini Dissanayake and Nilan De Silva

- Lankan Cricket Club won the toss and elected to field.
- Nadeera Balasooriya, Udith Madushan (Lankan Cricket Club) and Nisal Francisco (Burgher Recreation Club) all made their T20 debuts.

4 January 2020
Scorecard

Sri Lanka Ports Authority Cricket Club; 126/7 (20 overs)	v	Ragama Cricket Club; 130/1 (18.1 overs)
Prashan Wickramasinghe 28 (20); Udara Jayasundera 1/11 (3 overs)		Nishan Madushka 64* (54); Rajeewa Weerasinghe 1/27 (4 overs)

Ragama Cricket Club won by 9 wickets
FTZ Sports Complex, Katunayake
Umpires: Gamini Dissanayake and Nilan De Silva

- Ragama Cricket Club won the toss and elected to field.
- Supun Kavinda, Amoda Widanapathirana and Kavindu Ridmal (Sri Lanka Ports Authority Cricket Club) all made their T20 debuts.

4 January 2020
Scorecard

Colombo Cricket Club; 196/6 (20 overs)	v	Kandy Customs Cricket Club; 56 (15.4 overs)
Ashan Priyanjan 90 (48); Neranjan Kumuditha 4/42 (4 overs)		Ralph Fernando 24 (40); Ashan Priyanjan 4/11 (3.4 overs)

Colombo Cricket Club won by 140 runs
Colts Cricket Club Ground, Colombo
Umpires: Hemantha Boteju and Kapila Kottahachchi

- Kandy Customs Cricket Club won the toss and elected to field.
- Ralph Fernando, Irshad Umer and Neranjan Kumuditha (Kandy Customs Cricket Club) all made their T20 debuts.

6 January 2020
Scorecard

Colombo Cricket Club; 132/7 (20 overs)	v	Nugegoda Sports and Welfare Club; 121/9 (20 overs)
Lasith Abeyratne 34 (31); Nimantha Gunasiri 3/37 (4 overs)		Irosh Samarasooriya 21 (29); Malinda Pushpakumara 3/28 (4 overs)

Colombo Cricket Club won by 11 runs
FTZ Sports Complex, Katunayake
Umpires: Kamal Indrajith and Asanga Jayasooriya

- Nugegoda Sports and Welfare Club won the toss and elected to field.
- Movin Subasingha, Asantha Basnayake and Sadik de Silva (Nugegoda Sports and Welfare Club) all made their T20 debuts.

6 January 2020
Scorecard

Kandy Customs Cricket Club; 108/7 (20 overs)	v	Ragama Cricket Club; 112/3 (19.5 overs)
Akeel Inham 58 (54); Ishan Jayaratne 4/10 (4 overs)		Nishan Madushka 62* (61); Sachithra Perera 1/16 (4 overs)

Ragama Cricket Club won by 7 wickets
Colombo Cricket Club Ground, Colombo
Umpires: Rohitha Kottahachchi and Upul Wewage

- Kandy Customs Cricket Club won the toss and elected to bat.
- Ushan Imantha (Kandy Customs Cricket Club) made his T20 debut.

6 January 2020
Scorecard

Lankan Cricket Club; 120 (19.5 overs)	v	Sri Lanka Ports Authority Cricket Club; 109/8 (20 overs)
Chanaka Ruwansiri 28 (25); Supun Kavinda 3/15 (4 overs)		Gayan Maneeshan 56* (51); Udith Madushan 3/27 (4 overs)

Lankan Cricket Club won by 11 runs
Colombo Cricket Club Ground, Colombo
Umpires: Rohitha Kottahachchi and Upul Wewage

- Lankan Cricket Club won the toss and elected to bat.
- Dilhara Polgampola and Pasindu Ushettige (Sri Lanka Ports Authority Cricket Club) both made their T20 debuts.

8 January 2020
Scorecard

Burgher Recreation Club; 108/9 (20 overs)	v	Ragama Cricket Club; 109/5 (17.4 overs)
Hashen Ramanayake 40 (33); Amila Aponso 3/7 (3 overs)		Nishan Madushka 33 (37); Kevin Koththigoda 2/16 (3 overs)

Ragama Cricket Club won by 5 wickets
Colts Cricket Club Ground, Colombo
Umpires: Kapila Kottahachchi and Shantha Fonseka

- Ragama Cricket Club won the toss and elected to field.

8 January 2020
Scorecard

Colombo Cricket Club; 143/7 (20 overs)	v	Sri Lanka Ports Authority Cricket Club; 113/9 (20 overs)
Lasith Abeyratne 50* (47); Supun Kavinda 3/15 (4 overs)		Yohan de Silva 46 (41); Nuwan Thushara 3/19 (4 overs)

Colombo Cricket Club won by 30 runs
Nondescripts Cricket Club Ground, Colombo
Umpires: Sanjeewa Fernando and Keerthi Bandara

- Colombo Cricket Club won the toss and elected to bat.
- Ron Chandraguptha, MPM Weerasinghe (Colombo Cricket Club) and Anjana De Silva (Sri Lanka Ports Authority Cricket Club) all made their T20 debuts.

8 January 2020
Scorecard

Lankan Cricket Club; 136 (20 overs)	v	Nugegoda Sports and Welfare Club; 119/6 (20 overs)
Primosh Perera 54 (56); Chandula Weeraratne 4/26 (4 overs)		Pramud Hettiwatte 47 (35); Chanaka Ruwansiri 1/17 (3 overs)

Lankan Cricket Club won by 17 runs
Colts Cricket Club Ground, Colombo
Umpires: Kapila Kottahachchi and Shantha Fonseka

- Lankan Cricket Club won the toss and elected to bat.
- Kevin Perera, Umesh Lakshan (Lankan Cricket Club), Rahul Gunasekera, Chanuka Dilshan and Dulantha Sumathipala (Nugegoda Sports and Welfare Club) all made their T20 debuts.

10 January 2020
Scorecard

Burgher Recreation Club; 102/8 (20 overs)	v	Colombo Cricket Club; 108/4 (17.5 overs)
Raminda Wijesooriya 25 (26); Ashan Priyanjan 2/13 (4 overs)		Minod Bhanuka 40* (46); Lasith Lakshan 1/5 (2 overs)

Colombo Cricket Club won by 6 wickets
Sinhalese Sports Club Ground, Colombo
Umpires: Rohitha Kottahachchi and Eric Kannangara

- Colombo Cricket Club won the toss and elected to field.
- Malindu Shehan (Burgher Recreation Club) made his T20 debut.

10 January 2020
Scorecard

Nugegoda Sports and Welfare Club; 77 (17.4 overs)	v	Ragama Cricket Club; 78/2 (9.3 overs)
Irosh Samarasooriya 29 (27); Nishan Peiris 4/16 (4 overs)		Shehan Fernando 45 (24); Chamath Fernando 1/15 (1.3 overs)

Ragama Cricket Club won by 8 wickets
P Sara Oval, Colombo
Umpires: Hemantha Boteju and Kitsiri Jayaweera

- Nugegoda Sports and Welfare Club won the toss and elected to bat.
- Chamath Fernando, Samitha Rathnasooriya and Lahiru Pramodya (Nugegoda Sports and Welfare Club) all made their T20 debuts.

10 January 2020
Scorecard

Lankan Cricket Club; 128/8 (20 overs)	v	Kandy Customs Cricket Club; 101/7 (20 overs)
Damitha Silva 49; Ushan Imantha 2/20		Sampath Perera 29*; Udith Madushan 2/18

Lankan Cricket Club won by 27 runs
P Sara Oval, Colombo

- Lankan Cricket Club won the toss and elected to bat.
- Partial scorecard.

12 January 2020
Scorecard

Sri Lanka Ports Authority Cricket Club; 127/7 (20 overs)	v	Burgher Recreation Club; 128/2 (15 overs)
Yohan de Silva 58 (40); Hashen Ramanayake 3/27 (4 overs)		Raminda Wijesooriya 58 (37); Supun Kavinda 1/22 (2 overs)

Burgher Recreation Club won by 8 wickets
Tyronne Fernando Stadium, Moratuwa
Umpires: Saman Mohan de Silva and Pradeep Udawatta

- Sri Lanka Ports Authority Cricket Club won the toss and elected to bat.
- Richie Sharma, Deneth Lanka and Mithila Aravinda (Sri Lanka Ports Authority Cricket Club) all made their T20 debuts.

12 January 2020
Scorecard

Lankan Cricket Club; 109 (19.4 overs)	v	Colombo Cricket Club; 111/9 (19.3 overs)
Geeth Kumara 29 (26); Malinda Pushpakumara 3/17 (3.4 overs)		Shalika Karunanayake 22 (22); Keshan Wijerathne 5/15 (4 overs)

Colombo Cricket Club won by 1 wicket
Sinhalese Sports Club Ground, Colombo
Umpires: Gamini Dissanayake and Ranjith Vishwakula

- Lankan Cricket Club won the toss and elected to bat.

12 January 2020
Scorecard

Kandy Customs Cricket Club; 151/6 (20 overs)	v	Nugegoda Sports and Welfare Club; 156/1 (16 overs)
Nimnaka Ratnayake 50 (42); Poorna Wannithilake 3/29 (4 overs)		Irosh Samarasooriya 108* (59); Sampath Perera 1/11 (2 overs)

Nugegoda Sports and Welfare Club won by 9 wickets
Tyronne Fernando Stadium, Moratuwa
Umpires: Saman Mohan de Silva and Pradeep Udawatta

- Kandy Customs Cricket Club won the toss and elected to bat.
- Rajitha Wickramarachchi (Kandy Customs Cricket Club) and Poorna Wannithilake (Nugegoda Sports and Welfare Club) both made their T20 debuts.

14 January 2020
Scorecard

Kandy Customs Cricket Club; 148 (20 overs)	v	Sri Lanka Ports Authority Cricket Club; 115/8 (20 overs)
Sampath Perera 40 (20); Supun Kavinda 3/24 (4 overs)		Yohan de Silva 27 (19); Methusha Thilina 4/9 (4 overs)

Kandy Customs Cricket Club won by 33 runs
Tyronne Fernando Stadium, Moratuwa
Umpires: Ravindra Kottahachchi and Asanga Jayasooriya

- Kandy Customs Cricket Club won the toss and elected to bat.
- Sandaru Chanditha, Lasindu Nimsara, Methusha Thilina (Kandy Customs Cricket Club) and Vinuja Kiriella (Sri Lanka Ports Authority Cricket Club) all made their T20 debuts.

14 January 2020
Scorecard

Lankan Cricket Club; 135/5 (20 overs)	v	Ragama Cricket Club; 139/4 (18 overs)
Chanaka Ruwansiri 54* (44); Amila Aponso 3/20 (4 overs)		Nishan Madushka 51 (52); Stephen Susa 1/7 (2 overs)

Ragama Cricket Club won by 6 wickets
P Sara Oval, Colombo
Umpires: Deepal Gunawardene and Keerthi Bandara

- Ragama Cricket Club won the toss and elected to field.
- Stephen Susa and Tharaka Gunawardena (Lankan Cricket Club) both made their T20 debuts.

14 January 2020
Scorecard

Burgher Recreation Club; 148/5 (20 overs)	v	Nugegoda Sports and Welfare Club; 141 (19.5 overs)
Raminda Wijesooriya 41 (34); Pasindu Madushan 2/17 (3 overs)		Irosh Samarasooriya 56 (42); Hashen Ramanayake 3/21 (4 overs)

Burgher Recreation Club won by 7 runs
P Sara Oval, Colombo
Umpires: Deepal Gunawardene and Keerthi Bandara

- Burgher Recreation Club won the toss and elected to bat.
- Tharindu Gamage, Sehan Rangana and Thilina Ediriweera (Nugegoda Sports and Welfare Club) all made their T20 debuts.

15 January 2020
Scorecard

Kandy Customs Cricket Club; 123/8 (20 overs)	v	Burgher Recreation Club; 124/4 (17.4 overs)
Hasitha Madushan 49 (45); Bhanuka Rajapaksa 3/11 (3 overs)		Hashen Ramanayake 34* (30); Nimnaka Ratnayake 2/25 (4 overs)

Burgher Recreation Club won by 6 wickets
P Sara Oval, Colombo
Umpires: Ravindra Kottahachchi and Keerthi Bandara

- Kandy Customs Cricket Club won the toss and elected to bat.
- Savin Gunasekara, Hashan Sandeepa (Burgher Recreation Club) and Hasitha Madushan (Kandy Customs Cricket Club) all made their T20 debuts.

15 January 2020
Scorecard

Sri Lanka Ports Authority Cricket Club; 188/5 (20 overs)	v	Nugegoda Sports and Welfare Club; 162/9 (20 overs)
Gayan Maneeshan 78* (45); Chanuka Dilshan 2/24 (4 overs)		Nimantha Gunasiri 52 (34); Rajeewa Weerasinghe 3/33 (4 overs)

Sri Lanka Ports Authority Cricket Club won by 26 runs
Burgher Recreation Club Ground, Colombo
Umpires: Kapila Kottahachchi and Pradeep Udawatta

- Sri Lanka Ports Authority Cricket Club won the toss and elected to bat.
- Dilan Suraweera (Sri Lanka Ports Authority Cricket Club), S Ratnasuriya, DPBH Hirantha and D Wickramasinghe (Nugegoda Sports and Welfare Club) all made their T20 debuts.

15 January 2020
Scorecard

Ragama Cricket Club; 123/7 (20 overs)	v	Colombo Cricket Club; 92 (18.3 overs)
Janith Liyanage 31* (38); Wanindu Hasaranga 2/16 (4 overs)		Shalika Karunanayake 23 (22); Nishan Peiris 2/12 (2 overs)

Ragama Cricket Club won by 31 runs
P Sara Oval, Colombo
Umpires: Ravindra Kottahachchi and Keerthi Bandara

- Ragama Cricket Club won the toss and elected to bat.

== Knockout stage ==
=== Quarterfinals ===
1st Quarterfinal
17 January 2020
Scorecard

Badureliya Sports Club; 159/6 (20 overs)	v	Colombo Cricket Club; 163/3 (19.2 overs)
Shehan Madushanka 39* (19); Wanindu Hasaranga 3/19 (4 overs)		Malindu Maduranga 62 (38); Shehan Madushanka 3/20 (4 overs)

Colombo Cricket Club won by 7 wickets
FTZ Sports Complex, Katunayake
Umpires: Kapila Kottahachchi and Lyndon Hannibal

- Badureliya Sports Club won the toss and elected to bat.

2nd Quarterfinal
17 January 2020
Scorecard

Colts Cricket Club; 162/5 (20 overs)	v	Ragama Cricket Club; 163/5 (19 overs)
Avishka Fernando 76 (57); Shehan Sandaruwan 4/29 (3 overs)		Janith Liyanage 44 (32); Maheesh Theekshana 1/22 (4 overs)

Ragama Cricket Club won by 5 wickets
FTZ Sports Complex, Katunayake
Umpires: Chaminda Boteju and Nilan De Silva

- Colts Cricket Club won the toss and elected to bat.

3rd Quarterfinal
17 January 2020
Scorecard

Chilaw Marians Cricket Club; 163/8 (20 overs)	v	Sinhalese Sports Club; 149/8 (20 overs)
Lasith Croospulle 60 (42); Sachithra Senanayake 4/23 (4 overs)		Sachithra Senanayake 36 (23); Pulina Tharanga 2/19 (3 overs)

Chilaw Marians Cricket Club won by 14 runs
P Sara Oval, Colombo
Umpires: Rohitha Kottahachchi and Asanga Jayasooriya

- Sinhalese Sports Club won the toss and elected to bat.

4th Quarterfinal
17 January 2020
Scorecard

Sri Lanka Army Sports Club; 148/8 (20 overs)	v	Nondescripts Cricket Club; 152/4 (19.1 overs)
Lakshan Edirisinghe 39 (36); Chamika Gunasekara 2/20 (4 overs)		Mahela Udawatte 57* (42); Thisara Perera 2/25 (3 overs)

Nondescripts Cricket Club won by 6 wickets
P Sara Oval, Colombo
Umpires: Ranmore Martinesz and Pradeep Udawatta

- Sri Lanka Army Sports Club won the toss and elected to bat.

=== Finals ===
1st Semi-final
19 January 2020
Scorecard

Chilaw Marians Cricket Club; 168/8 (20 overs)	v	Ragama Cricket Club; 135 (19 overs)
Lasith Croospulle 67 (46); Udara Jayasundera 4/16 (4 overs)		Udara Jayasundera 35 (30); Pulina Tharanga 3/18 (3 overs)

Chilaw Marians Cricket Club won by 33 runs
FTZ Sports Complex, Katunayake
Umpires: Deepal Gunawardene and Keerthi Bandara

- Ragama Cricket Club won the toss and elected to field.

2nd Semi-final
19 January 2020
Scorecard

Colombo Cricket Club; 144 (20 overs)	v	Nondescripts Cricket Club; 134/8 (20 overs)
Malindu Maduranga 38 (30); Chamika Gunasekara 4/23 (4 overs)		Lahiru Udara 65 (48); Malinda Pushpakumara 2/25 (4 overs)

Colombo Cricket Club won by 10 runs
FTZ Sports Complex, Katunayake
Umpires: Gamini Dissanayake and Ravindra Kottahachchi

- Colombo Cricket Club won the toss and elected to bat.

Final
21 January 2020
Scorecard

Chilaw Marians Cricket Club; 162/8 (20 overs)	v	Colombo Cricket Club; 165/6 (20 overs)
Shehan Jayasuriya 80 (52); Malinda Pushpakumara 2/27 (4 overs)		Wanindu Hasaranga 60* (34); Pulina Tharanga 2/24 (4 overs)

Colombo Cricket Club won by 4 wickets
Sinhalese Sports Club Ground, Colombo
Umpires: Lyndon Hannibal and Ruchira Palliyaguruge

- Colombo Cricket Club won the toss and elected to field.
