= Dilshan =

Dilshan is a common Sinhalese name.

Dilshan may refer to:

== Surname ==
- Chamod Dilshan, Sri Lankan footballer
- Chanuk Dilshan, Sri Lankan cricketer
- Dinuka Dilshan, Sri Lankan cricketer
- Kavika Dilshan, Sri Lankan cricketer
- Lahiru Dilshan, Sri Lankan cricketer
- Pasindu Dilshan, Sri Lankan cricketer
- Pathum Dilshan, Sri Lankan cricketer
- Rajitha Dilshan, Sri Lankan cricketer
- Rashmika Dilshan, Sri Lankan cricketer
- Sasika Dilshan, Sri Lankan cricketer
- Tharindu Dilshan, Sri Lankan cricketer
- Thisara Dilshan, Sri Lankan cricketer
- Thulina Dilshan, Sri Lankan cricketer
- Tillakaratne Dilshan, Sri Lankan former cricketer

== Given name ==
- Dilshan Abeysinghe, Sri Lankan cricketer
- Dilshan de Soysa, Sri Lankan cricketer
- Dilshan Kanchana, Sri Lankan cricketer
- Dilshan Kollure, Sri Lankan cricketer
- Dilshan Madushanka, Sri Lankan cricketer
- Dilshan Mendis, Sri Lankan cricketer
- Dilshan Munaweera, Sri Lankan cricketer
- Dilshan Sanjeewa, Sri Lankan cricketer
- Dilshan Vitharana, Sri Lankan cricketer
- Ranindu Dilshan Liyanage, Sri Lankan chess player
