= Siriwardena =

Siriwardena (Sinhala: සිරිවර්ධන) is a surname found in Sri Lanka. It can also be spelled Siriwardana, Siriwardene, Siriwardane, Siriwardhana, or Sriwardene.

Notable people with this surname include:

== Siriwardena ==
- Ajith Kumar Siriwardena, a British professor and surgeon
- Chandrika Siriwardena (born 1948), a Sri Lankan singer
- Denagama Siriwardena, a Sri Lankan writer and journalist
- Dhananjaya Siriwardena, a Sri Lankan actor
- H. de Z. Siriwardena (1898 – after 1954), a Sri Lankan politician
- Himali Siriwardena, a Sri Lankan actress
- Inshaka Siriwardena (born 2000), a Sri Lankan cricketer
- M. P. de Z. Siriwardena (1906 – 1978), a Sri Lankan politician
- Regi Siriwardena (1922 – 2004), a Sri Lankan academic and writer

== Siriwardana ==
- Dhammika Siriwardana (1954 – 2015), a Sri Lankan producer and businessman
- Kalindu Siriwardana (born 2000), a Sri Lankan cricketer
- Milinda Siriwardana (born 1985), a Sri Lankan cricketer
- Vishaka Siriwardana (1956 – 2021), a Sri Lankan actress

== Siriwardene ==
- Buddhi Siriwardene, a Sri Lankan air officer
- Prathapa Siriwardene (born 1989), a Sri Lankan cricketer
- Shashikala Siriwardene (born 1985), a Sri Lankan cricketer

== Siriwardane ==
- Janaka Siriwardane (born 1979), a Sri Lankan cricketer

== Siriwardhana ==
- Ayana Siriwardhana (born 1999), a Sri Lankan cricketer
- Stephanie Siriwardhana (born 1988), a Sri Lankan-Lebanese TV host and model
- W. L. Siriwardhana (1938 – 2010), a Sri Lankan volleyball player

== Sriwardene ==
- Tharindu Sriwardene (born 1984), a Sri Lankan cricketer
