= Madushanka =

Madushanka or Madhushanka is a Sinhalese surname that may refer to the following notable Sri Lankan cricketers:

- Ashan Madhushanka (born 1996)
- Buddika Madushanka (born 1992)
- Dananja Madushanka
- Danushka Madushanka (born 1990)
- Dilshan Madushanka (born 2000)
- Imesh Madushanka (born 1998)
- Kanishka Madhushanka (born 1997)
- Kasun Madushanka (born 1991)
- Lahiru Madushanka (born 1992)
- Lakshan Madushanka (born 1990)
- Madura Madushanka (born 1994)
- Navod Madushanka Weeratunga (born 1996)
- Nimanda Madushanka (born 1992)
- Shehan Madushanka (born 1995)
- Supun Madushanka (born 1993)
- Thushara Madushanka (born 1993)

== See also ==
- Madusanka (disambiguation)
