= Danushka =

Danushka is both a given name and a surname. Notable people with the name include:

- Danushka Bandara (born 1985), Sri Lankan cricketer
- Danushka Gunathilaka (born 1991), Sri Lankan cricketer
- Danushka Madushanka (born 1990), Sri Lankan cricketer
- Danushka Sandaruwan (born 1993), Sri Lankan cricketer
- Sanka Danushka, Sri Lankan footballer
