= Sri Lanka 'A' cricket team in Windies in 2017 =

Sri Lanka 'A' cricket team in the West Indies in 2017
	West Indies A	Sri Lanka A
Captains	Shamarh Brooks (Tests)	Dhananjaya de Silva

Test series
- Result: Sri Lanka A won the 3-match series 2–1

One Day International series
- Results: 3-match series drawn 1–1

The Sri Lanka A cricket team toured West Indies in October and November 2017 to play three first-class matches and three limited-overs matches against the West Indies A. Sri Lanka A was captained by Dhananjaya de Silva and the West Indies A by Shamarh Brooks.

== Squads ==
Tests		ODIs	
(Cricket West Indies) West Indies A	Sri Lanka A	(Cricket West Indies) West Indies A	Sri Lanka A
Shamarh Brooks (c); Sunil Ambris; Vishal Singh; John Campbell; Yannic Cariah; Rahkeem Cornwall; Sheldon Cottrell; Jahmar Hamilton; Montcin Hodge; Damion Jacobs; Keon Joseph; Reynard Leveridge; Oshane Thomas	Dhananjaya de Silva (c); Charith Asalanka; Ron Chandraguptha; Sandun Weerakkody; Dasun Shanaka; Shehan Jayasuriya; Roshen Silva; Sadeera Samarawickrama; Malinda Pushpakumara; Wanidu Hasaranga; Amila Aponso; Lahiru Kumara; Vimukthi Perera; Asitha Fernando; Kasun Rajitha; Chamika Karunaratne		Dhananjaya de Silva (c); Charith Asalanka; Ron Chandraguptha; Sandun Weerakkody; Dasun Shanaka; Shehan Jayasuriya; Roshen Silva; Sadeera Samarawickrama; Malinda Pushpakumara; Wanidu Hasaranga; Amila Aponso; Lahiru Kumara; Vimukthi Perera; Asitha Fernando; Kasun Rajitha; Chamika Karunaratne

== Test Series ==
=== 1st Unofficial Test ===
11–14 October 2017
Scorecard

West Indies A (Cricket West Indies)	v	Sri Lanka A
364/8 (120 overs); Sunil Ambris 106(156); Malinda Pushpakumara 3/104 (36 overs)		212 (56.4 overs); Dhananjaya de Silva 104(143); Keon Joseph 3/33(10 overs)
		139 (44.2 overs)(f/o); Sandun Weerakkody; Damion Jacobs 6/27 (15 overs)

West Indies A won by an innings and 13 runs.
Trelawny Stadium, Trelawny, Jamaica
Umpires: Paul Gustard and Chris Wright
Player of the match: Damion Jacobs (West Indies A)

- West Indies A won the toss and elected to bat.

=== 2nd Unofficial Test ===
19–22 October 2017
Scorecard

Lankans A (Sri Lanka)	v	(Cricket West Indies) West Indies A
294 (73.3 overs); Dasun Shanaka 102*(108); Keon Joseph 3/32 (11 overs)		137 (44.3 overs); Rahkeem Cornwall 46(45); Malinda Pushpakumara 6/52 (20 overs)
267/9d (67.5 overs); Roshen Silva 86(159); Rahkeem Cornwall 5/107 (25.5 overs)		144 (54 overs); Sunil Ambris 41(76); Malinda Pushpakumara 6/46 (21 overs)

Sri Lanka A won by 280 runs
Trelawny Stadium, Trelawny, Jamaica
Umpires: Verdayne Smith and Christopher Taylor
Player of the match: Malinda Pushpakumara(Sri Lanka A)

- Sri Lanka A won the toss and elected to bat.

=== 3rd Unofficial Test ===
26–29 October 2017
Scorecard

West Indies A (Cricket West Indies)	v	Sri Lanka A
181 (60.3 overs); Sunil Ambris 101(156); Malinda Pushpakumara 4/67 (23 overs)		273 (76.2 overs); Dhananjaya de Silva 64(97); Keon Joseph 2/43 (12 overs)
118 (37.3 overs); Shamarh Brooks 52(90); Shehan Jayasuriya 6/60 (17 overs)		27/0 (5.5 overs); Nipun Karunanayake 17*(21)

Sri Lanka A won by 10 wickets
Sabina Park, Kingston, Jamaica
Umpires: Patrick Gustard and Verdayne Smith
Player of the match: Shehan Jayasuriya (Sri Lanka A)

- West Indies A won the toss and elected to bat.

== ODI Series ==
=== 1st Unofficial ODI ===
01 November
09:00
Scorecard

West Indies A (Cricket West Indies); 176 (48.4 overs)	v	Sri Lanka A 181/8 (48 overs)
Montcin Hodge 54(69); Lahiru Kumara 3/26 (7.4 overs)		Charith Asalanka 33(78); Sheldon Cottrell 4/44 (10 overs)

Sri Lanka A won by 2 wickets
Sabina Park, Kingston, Jamaica
Umpires: Verdayne Smith and Christopher Taylor
Player of the match: Amila Aponso (Sri Lanka A)

- West Indies A won the toss and elected to bat.

=== 2nd Unofficial ODI ===
03 November
09:00
Scorecard

West Indies A (Cricket West Indies)	v	Sri Lanka A

Match Abandoned without a ball bowled
Sabina Park, Kingston, Jamaica
Umpires: Patrick Gustard and Christopher Taylor

=== 3rd Unofficial ODI ===
05 November
09:00
Scorecard

West Indies A (Cricket West Indies); 152 (44.1 overs)	v	Sri Lanka A 107 (38.3 overs)
Shamarh Brooks 35(59); Vimukthi Perera 4/25 (9.1 overs)		Nipun Karunanayake 47(113); Sheldon Cottrell 4/19 (8.3 overs)

West Indies A won by 45 runs
Trelawny Stadium, Trelawny, Jamaica
Umpires: Patrick Gustard and Verdayne Smith
Player of the match: Sheldon Cottrell (West Indies A)

- West Indies A won the toss and elected to bat.
