= Siriwardene =

Siriwardene is a surname. Notable people with the surname include:

- Buddhi Siriwardene (fl. 1959–1992), Sri Lankan air force officer
- Prathapa Siriwardene (born 1989), Sri Lankan cricketer
- Shashikala Siriwardene (born 1989), Sri Lankan cricketer
