= Wickramarachchi =

Wickramarachchi is a surname. Notable people with the surname include:

- G. P. Wickramarachchi (1889–1975) , Sri Lankan Ayurvedic practitioners
- Rajitha Wickramarachchi (born 1987), Sri Lankan cricketer
- M Y Wickramarachchi: Sri Lankan-origin Australian based entrepreneur

== See also ==
- Gampaha Wickramarachchi University of Indigenous Medicine, public university located in Yakkala, Sri Lanka
