= Imesh (given name) =

Imesh is a Sinhalese masculine given name. Notable people with the name include:

- Imesh Madushanka (born 1998), Sri Lankan cricketer
- Imesh Udayanga (born 1990), Sri Lankan cricketer
