= Weeratunga =

Weeratunga is a surname. Notable people with the surname include:

- Lalith Weeratunga (born 1950), Sri Lankan politician
- Navod Madushanka Weeratunga (born 1996), Sri Lankan cricketer
- Tissa Weeratunga (1930–2003), Sri Lankan general
- Udayanga Weeratunga, Sri Lankan businessman
