= Prathapa =

Prathapa may refer to:

== People ==
- Prathapa Siriwardene (born 1989), Sri Lankan cricketer.
- G.Prathapa Varma Thampan, Indian politician

== Other uses ==
- Veera Prathapa, national honour of Sri Lanka
- Prathapa Mudaliar Charithram, novel
