= Thilanka =

Thilanka is both a given name and a surname. Notable people with the name include:

- Thilanka de Silva (born 1997), Sri Lankan cricketer
- Thilanka Palangasinghe (born 1993), Sri Lankan weightlifter
- Nishan Thilanka (born 1991), Sri Lankan cricketer
