= Sandun =

Sandun is a given name. Notable people with the name include:

- Sandun Dias (born 1985), Sri Lankan cricketer
- Sandun Fernando (born 1999), Sri Lankan cricketer
- Sandun Mendis (born 2001), Sri Lankan cricketer
- Sandun Wijemanne Nissanka (born 1998), Sri Lankan-American record industry executive
- Sandun Rathnatunga (born 1990), Sri Lankan cricketer
- Sandun Weerakkody (born 1993), Sri Lankan cricketer

== See also ==
- Sandun station, metro station in China
