= Ahangama (surname) =

Ahangama is a Sinhalese surname. Notable people with the surname include:

- Roanaka Ahangama (born 1994), Sri Lankan cricketer
- Saliya Ahangama (born 1959), Sri Lankan cricketer
