= Sumathipala =

Sumathipala is a surname. Notable people with the surname include:

- Dulantha Sumathipala (born 1997), Sri Lankan cricketer
- Thilanga Sumathipala (born 1964), Sri Lankan politician
- Upul Sumathipala (born 1959), Sri Lankan cricketer
