= Tharindu Gamage =

Sri Lankan cricketer (born 1996)

Personal information
- Born: 30 May 1996 (age 30)
- Source: Cricinfo, 3 April 2021

Tharindu Gamage (born 30 May 1996) is a Sri Lankan cricketer. He made his Twenty20 debut for Nugegoda Sports and Welfare Club in the 2019–20 SLC Twenty20 Tournament on 14 January 2020. He made his List A debut on 3 April 2021, for Kandy Customs Cricket Club in the 2020–21 Major Clubs Limited Over Tournament.
