= Dilhara =

Dilhara is both a given name and a surname. Notable people with the name include:

- Ashan Dilhara (born 2000), Sri Lankan cricketer
- Michelle Dilhara (born 1996), Sri Lankan actress
- Dilhara Fernando (born 1979), Sri Lankan cricketer
- Dilhara Lokuhettige (born 1980), Sri Lankan cricketer
- Dilhara Polgampola (born 1999), Sri Lankan cricketer
- Dilhara Salgado (born 1983), Sri Lankan archer
