= Dhanushka =

Dhanushka is both a given name and a surname. Notable people with the name include:

- Dhanushka Dharmasiri (born 1992), Sri Lankan cricketer
- Dhanushka Ranasinghe (born 1992), Sri Lankan cricketer
- Heshan Dhanushka (born 1998), Sri Lankan cricketer
- Koshan Dhanushka (born 1993), Sri Lankan cricketer
