= Ushan =

Ushan is both a given name and a surname. Notable people with the name include:

- Ushan Çakır (born 1984), Turkish actor
- Ushan Imantha (born 1999), Sri Lankan cricketer
- Ushan Manohara (born 1989), Sri Lankan cricketer
- Ushan Thiwanka (born 1998), Sri Lankan high jumper
- Salinda Ushan (born 1997), Sri Lankan cricketer
