= Vimukthi Kulatunga =

Sri Lankan cricketer (born 1998)

Personal information
- Born: 14 November 1998 (age 27)
- Source: Cricinfo, 26 March 2021

Vimukthi Kulatunga (born 14 November 1998) is a Sri Lankan cricketer. He made his Twenty20 debut on 10 January 2020, for Panadura Sports Club in the 2019–20 SLC Twenty20 Tournament. He made his List A debut on 26 March 2021, for Nugegoda Sports and Welfare Club in the 2020–21 Major Clubs Limited Over Tournament.
