= Wannithilake =

Wannithilake is a surname. Notable people with the surname include:

- Dulangi Wannithilake (born 1994) is a Sri Lankan netball player
- Poorna Wannithilake (born 1998), Sri Lankan cricketer
