= Siriwardana =

Siriwardana is a surname. Notable people with the surname include:

- Dhammika Siriwardana (1954–2015), Sri Lankan film director
- Kalindu Siriwardana (born 2000), Sri Lankan cricketer
- Milinda Siriwardana (born 1985), Sri Lankan cricketer
