= Suranga Paranavitana =

Sri Lankan cricketer (born 1977)

Personal information
- Born: 17 July 1977 (age 49)
- Source: Cricinfo, 6 January 2020

Suranga Paranavitana (born 17 July 1977) is a Sri Lankan cricketer. He made his Twenty20 debut on 6 January 2020, for Sri Lanka Navy Sports Club in the 2019–20 SLC Twenty20 Tournament.
