= Janindu Inuwara =

Sri Lankan cricketer (born 1999)

Personal information
- Born: 12 December 1999 (age 26)
- Source: Cricinfo, 8 January 2020

Janindu Inuwara (born 12 December 1999) is a Sri Lankan cricketer. He made his List A debut on 19 December 2019, for Panadura Sports Club in the 2019–20 Invitation Limited Over Tournament. He made his Twenty20 debut on 8 January 2020, for Panadura Sports Club in the 2019–20 SLC Twenty20 Tournament.
