= Sujan Mayura =

Sri Lankan cricketer (born 1989)

Personal information
- Born: 11 September 1989 (age 37)

Sujan Mayura (born 11 September 1989) is a Sri Lankan cricketer. He made his List A debut for Police Sports Club in the 2018–19 Premier Limited Overs Tournament on 4 March 2019. He made his Twenty20 debut on 6 January 2020, for Police Sports Club in the 2019–20 SLC Twenty20 Tournament.
