= Lasindu Arosha =

Sri Lankan cricketer (born 1999)

Personal information
- Born: 21 April 1999 (age 27); Colombo, Sri Lanka
- Source: Cricinfo, 6 January 2020

Lasindu Arosha (born 21 April 1999) is a Sri Lankan cricketer. He made his Twenty20 debut on 6 January 2020, for Unichela Sports Club in the 2019–20 SLC Twenty20 Tournament.
