= Sandeep Nisansala =

Sri Lankan cricketer (born 1995)

Personal information
- Born: 26 April 1995 (age 31)
- Source: Cricinfo, 19 December 2019

Sandeep Nisansala (born 26 April 1995) is a Sri Lankan cricketer. He made his List A debut on 19 December 2019, for Kurunegala Youth Cricket Club in the 2019–20 Invitation Limited Over Tournament.
