= Kaveesh Kumara =

Sri Lankan cricketer (born 1998)

Personal information
- Born: 10 February 1998 (age 28)
- Source: Cricinfo, 16 December 2019

Kaveesh Kumara (born 10 February 1998) is a Sri Lankan cricketer. He made his List A debut on 16 December 2019, for Galle Cricket Club in the 2019–20 Invitation Limited Over Tournament.
