= Sandaru Chanditha =

Sri Lankan cricketer (born 2000)

Personal information
- Full name: Sandaru Chanditha Wickramaratne
- Born: 26 May 2000 (age 26)
- Source: Cricinfo, 3 January 2020

Sandaru Chanditha Wickramaratne (born 26 May 2000) is a Sri Lankan cricketer. He made his List A debut on 23 December 2019, for Kandy Customs Cricket Club in the 2019–20 Invitation Limited Over Tournament. He made his Twenty20 debut on 14 January 2020, for Kandy Customs Cricket Club in the 2019–20 SLC Twenty20 Tournament.
