= Sahan Peiris =

Sri Lankan cricketer (born 1997)

Personal information
- Born: 19 September 1997 (age 29)
- Source: Cricinfo, 24 February 2018

Sahan Peiris (born 19 September 1997) is a Sri Lankan cricketer. He made his Twenty20 debut for Galle Cricket Club in the 2017–18 SLC Twenty20 Tournament on 24 February 2018. He made his List A debut on 19 December 2019, for Lankan Cricket Club in the 2019–20 Invitation Limited Over Tournament.
