= Samyag Silva =

Sri Lankan cricketer (born 1999)

Personal information
- Born: 7 January 1999 (age 27)
- Source: Cricinfo, 12 January 2020

Samyag Silva (born 7 January 1999) is a Sri Lankan cricketer. He made his Twenty20 debut on 12 January 2020, for Kalutara Town Club in the 2019–20 SLC Twenty20 Tournament.
