= Vinura Dulsara =

Sri Lankan cricketer (born 2000)

Personal information
- Born: 24 June 2000 (age 26)
- Source: Cricinfo, 16 December 2019

Vinura Dulsara (born 24 June 2000) is a Sri Lankan cricketer. He made his List A debut on 16 December 2019, for Galle Cricket Club in the 2019–20 Invitation Limited Over Tournament. He made his Twenty20 debut on 6 January 2020, for Galle Cricket Club in the 2019–20 SLC Twenty20 Tournament. He made his first-class debut on 31 January 2020, for Galle Cricket Club in Tier B of the 2019–20 Premier League Tournament.
