= Poorna Wannithilake =

Sri Lankan cricketer (born 1998)

Personal information
- Born: 3 March 1998 (age 28)
- Source: Cricinfo, 15 December 2019

Poorna Wannithilake (born 3 March 1998) is a Sri Lankan cricketer. He made his List A debut on 15 December 2019, for Nugegoda Sports and Welfare Club in the 2019–20 Invitation Limited Over Tournament. He made his Twenty20 debut on 12 January 2020, for Nugegoda Sports and Welfare Club in the 2019–20 SLC Twenty20 Tournament.
