= Dhakshitha Fernando =

Sri Lankan cricketer (born 1999)

Personal information
- Born: 7 October 1999 (age 27)
- Source: Cricinfo, 10 January 2020

Dhakshitha Fernando (born 7 October 1999) is a Sri Lankan cricketer. He made his Twenty20 debut on 10 January 2020, for Tamil Union Cricket and Athletic Club in the 2019–20 SLC Twenty20 Tournament. He made his first-class debut on 31 January 2020, for Tamil Union Cricket and Athletic Club in the 2019–20 Premier League Tournament.
