= Sachendra Gamaadikari =

Sri Lankan cricketer (born 1997)

Personal information
- Born: 5 July 1997 (age 29)
- Source: Cricinfo, 22 December 2019

Sachendra Gamaadikari (born 5 July 1997) is a Sri Lankan cricketer. He made his List A debut on 22 December 2019, for Police Sports Club in the 2019–20 Invitation Limited Over Tournament.
