= Udith Madushan =

Sri Lankan cricketer (born 1997)

Personal information
- Full name: Warnakulasooriya Patabedige Udith Madushan
- Born: 15 June 1997 (age 29); Hambantota, Sri Lanka
- Batting: Right-handed
- Bowling: Right arm fast medium
- Source: ESPNcricinfo, 30 December 2016

Udith Madushan (born 15 June 1997) is a Sri Lankan cricketer. He made his first-class debut for Ragama Cricket Club in the 2016–17 Premier League Tournament on 28 December 2016. He made his List A debut for Mannar District in the 2016–17 Districts One Day Tournament on 22 March 2017. He made his Twenty20 debut on 4 January 2020, for Lankan Cricket Club in the 2019–20 SLC Twenty20 Tournament. In August 2021, he was named in the SLC Greys team for the 2021 SLC Invitational T20 League tournament.

In April 2022, Sri Lanka Cricket (SLC) named him in the Sri Lanka Emerging Team's squad for their tour to England. In June 2022, he was named in the Sri Lanka A squad for their matches against Australia A during Australia's tour of Sri Lanka.
