= Vimud Sapnaka =

Sri Lankan cricketer (born 2000)

Personal information
- Full name: Sammu Vimud Sapnaka
- Born: 26 June 2000 (age 26); Galle, Sri Lanka
- Source: Cricinfo, 15 July 2020

Vimud Sapnaka (born 26 June 2000) is a Sri Lankan cricketer. He made his List A debut on 17 December 2019, for Sri Lanka Navy Sports Club in the 2019–20 Invitation Limited Over Tournament. He made his Twenty20 debut on 6 January 2020, for Sri Lanka Navy Sports Club in the 2019–20 SLC Twenty20 Tournament. He made his first-class debut for Sri Lanka Navy Sports Club in Tier B of the 2019–20 Premier League Tournament on 6 March 2020.
