= Samitha Ranga =

Sri Lankan cricketer (born 1998)

Personal information
- Full name: Nandinahewa Samitha Ranga
- Born: 14 April 1998 (age 28); Colombo, Sri Lanka
- Batting: Right-handed
- Bowling: Right-arm off break
- Source: Cricinfo, 14 December 2019

Samitha Ranga (born 14 April 1998) is a Sri Lankan cricketer. He made his first-class debut on 11 January 2019, for Nondescripts Cricket Club in the 2018–19 Premier League Tournament. He made his List A debut on 14 December 2019, for Sri Lanka Navy Sports Club in the 2019–20 Invitation Limited Over Tournament. He made his Twenty20 debut on 4 January 2020, for Sri Lanka Navy Sports Club in the 2019–20 SLC Twenty20 Tournament.
