= Lahiru Wijetunga =

Sri Lankan cricketer (born 1989)

Personal information
- Born: 7 January 1989 (age 37)
- Source: Cricinfo, 14 December 2019

Lahiru Wijetunga (born 7 January 1989) is a Sri Lankan cricketer. He made his List A debut on 14 December 2019, for Sri Lanka Army Sports Club in the 2019–20 Invitation Limited Over Tournament. He made his Twenty20 debut on 4 January 2020, for Sri Lanka Army Sports Club in the 2019–20 SLC Twenty20 Tournament.
