= Haren Buddila =

Sri Lankan cricketer (born 1999)

Personal information
- Born: 2 June 1999 (age 27)
- Source: Cricinfo, 14 December 2019

Haren Buddila (born 2 June 1999) is a Sri Lankan cricketer. He made his List A debut on 14 December 2019, for Negombo Cricket Club in the 2019–20 Invitation Limited Over Tournament. Prior to his List A debut, he was named in Sri Lanka's squad for the 2018 Under-19 Cricket World Cup.
