= Sumit Ghadigaonkar =

Indian cricketer (born 1992)

Personal information
- Born: 11 April 1992 (age 34)
- Source: Cricinfo, 28 December 2019

Sumit Ghadigaonkar (born 11 April 1992) is an Indian cricketer. He made his List A debut on 28 December 2019, for Chilaw Marians Cricket Club in the 2019–20 Invitation Limited Over Tournament in Sri Lanka. On his List A debut, he scored a century, and in his next match he scored 99. He made his first-class debut on 7 February 2020, for Chilaw Marians Cricket Club in the 2019–20 Premier League Tournament.
