= Dulith Gayan =

Sri Lankan cricketer (born 1993)

Personal information
- Born: 3 September 1993 (age 33)
- Source: Cricinfo, 8 January 2020

Dulith Gayan (born 3 September 1993) is a Sri Lankan cricketer.

== Career ==
He made his List A debut for Hambantota District in the 2016–17 Districts One Day Tournament on 26 March 2017 and his Twenty20 debut on 8 January 2020, for Unichela Sports Club in the 2019–20 SLC Twenty20 Tournament.
