= Kaumal Nanayakkara =

Sri Lankan cricketer (born 1999)

Personal information
- Born: 17 November 1999 (age 26)
- Source: Cricinfo, 12 January 2020

Kaumal Nanayakkara (born 17 November 1999) is a Sri Lankan cricketer. He made his Twenty20 debut on 12 January 2020, for Panadura Sports Club in the 2019–20 SLC Twenty20 Tournament. He made his List A debut on 1 April 2021, for Panadura Sports Club in the 2020–21 Major Clubs Limited Over Tournament.
