= Richie Sharma =

English cricketer (born 1996)

Personal information
- Full name: Tushant Richie Sharma
- Born: 11 November 1996 (age 30); Ealing, United Kingdom
- Source: Cricinfo, 12 January 2020

Richie Sharma (born 11 November 1996) is an English cricketer. He made his Twenty20 debut on 12 January 2020, for Sri Lanka Ports Authority Cricket Club in the 2019–20 SLC Twenty20 Tournament.
