= Laksitha Rasanjana =

Sri Lankan cricketer (born 1998)

Personal information
- Born: 21 November 1998 (age 27)
- Source: Cricinfo, 14 December 2019

Laksitha Rasanjana (born 21 November 1998) is a Sri Lankan cricketer. He made his List A debut on 14 December 2019, for Negombo Cricket Club in the 2019–20 Invitation Limited Over Tournament.
