= Lasan de Silva =

Sri Lankan cricketer (born 1983)

Personal information
- Born: 6 July 1983 (age 43)
- Source: Cricinfo, 15 February 2019

Lasan de Silva (born 6 July 1983) is a Sri Lankan cricketer. He made his Twenty20 debut for Police Sports Club in the 2018–19 SLC Twenty20 Tournament on 15 February 2019. He made his List A debut on 14 December 2019, for Police Sports Club in the 2019–20 Invitation Limited Over Tournament.
