= Nusky Ahmed =

Sri Lankan cricketer (born 1999)

Personal information
- Born: 25 March 1999 (age 27); Peradeniya
- Batting: Left-handed
- Bowling: Slow left arm orthodox

Domestic team information
- Years: Team
- 2020-present: Sri Lanka Air Force Sports Club
- Source: Cricinfo, 14 July 2020

Nusky Ahmed (born 25 March 1999) is a Sri Lankan cricketer. He made his List A debut on 19 December 2019, for Sri Lanka Air Force Sports Club in the 2019–20 Invitation Limited Over Tournament. He made his first-class debut on 14 February 2020, for Sri Lanka Air Force Sports Club in Tier B of the 2019–20 Premier League Tournament.
