= Sadish Pathiranage =

Sri Lankan cricketer (born 1997)

Personal information
- Full name: Sadish Anthony Pathiranage
- Born: 24 March 1997 (age 29); Colombo, Sri Lanka
- Source: Cricinfo, 23 February 2019

Sadish Pathiranage (born 24 March 1997) is a Sri Lankan cricketer. He made his first-class debut for Tamil Union Cricket and Athletic Club in the 2018–19 Premier League Tournament on 7 December 2018. He made his Twenty20 debut for Tamil Union Cricket and Athletic Club in the 2018–19 SLC Twenty20 Tournament on 23 February 2019. He made his List A debut on 14 December 2019, for Tamil Union Cricket and Athletic Club in the 2019–20 Invitation Limited Over Tournament.
