= Stephen Susa =

Sri Lankan cricketer (born 1998)

Personal information
- Born: 12 May 1998 (age 28)
- Source: Cricinfo, 14 January 2020

Stephen Susa (born 12 May 1998) is a Sri Lankan cricketer. He made his Twenty20 debut on 14 January 2020, for Lankan Cricket Club in the 2019–20 SLC Twenty20 Tournament.
