= Johanne de Silva =

Sri Lankan cricketer (born 2001)

Personal information
- Born: 16 January 2001 (age 25)
- Source: Cricinfo, 14 December 2019

Johanne de Silva (born 16 January 2001) is a Sri Lankan cricketer. He made his List A debut on 14 December 2019, for Sri Lanka Navy Sports Club in the 2019–20 Invitation Limited Over Tournament.
