= Ushantha Perera =

Sri Lankan cricketer (born 1992)

Personal information
- Born: 5 September 1992 (age 34)
- Source: Cricinfo, 6 January 2020

Ushantha Perera (born 5 September 1992) is a Sri Lankan cricketer. He made his Twenty20 debut on 6 January 2020, for Unichela Sports Club in the 2019–20 SLC Twenty20 Tournament.
