= Kavindu Bandara =

Sri Lankan cricketer (born 1997)

Personal information
- Born: 7 May 1997 (age 29)
- Source: Cricinfo, 6 January 2020

Kavindu Bandara (born 7 May 1997) is a Sri Lankan cricketer. He made his Twenty20 debut on 6 January 2020, for Unichela Sports Club in the 2019–20 SLC Twenty20 Tournament.
