= Sawan Prabash =

Sri Lankan cricketer (born 1999)

Personal information
- Born: 18 February 1999 (age 27)
- Source: Cricinfo, 14 December 2019

Sawan Prabash (born 18 February 1999) is a Sri Lankan cricketer. He made his List A debut on 14 December 2019, for Lankan Cricket Club in the 2019–20 Invitation Limited Over Tournament.
