= Shabik Ifthary =

Sri Lankan cricketer (born 1998)

Personal information
- Born: 8 August 1998 (age 28)
- Source: Cricinfo, 4 January 2020

Shabik Ifthary (born 8 August 1998) is a Sri Lankan cricketer. He made his List A debut on 19 December 2019, for Sri Lanka Air Force Sports Club in the 2019–20 Invitation Limited Over Tournament. He made his Twenty20 debut on 4 January 2020, for Sri Lanka Air Force Sports Club in the 2019–20 SLC Twenty20 Tournament. He made his first-class debut on 14 February 2020, for Sri Lanka Air Force Sports Club in Tier B of the 2019–20 Premier League Tournament.
