= Dulantha Sumathipala =

Sri Lankan cricketer (born 1997)

Personal information
- Born: 3 May 1997 (age 29)
- Source: Cricinfo, 8 January 2020

Dulantha Sumathipala (born 3 May 1997) is a Sri Lankan cricketer. He made his Twenty20 debut on 8 January 2020, for Nugegoda Sports and Welfare Club in the 2019–20 SLC Twenty20 Tournament.
