= Mohammed Faheem =

Sri Lankan cricketer (born 1999)

Personal information
- Born: 17 May 1999 (age 27)
- Source: Cricinfo, 10 January 2020

Mohammed Faheem (born 17 May 1999) is a Sri Lankan cricketer. He made his Twenty20 debut on 10 January 2020, for Police Sports Club in the 2019–20 SLC Twenty20 Tournament. He made his first-class debut on 5 February 2020, for Police Sports Club in Tier B of the 2019–20 Premier League Tournament.
