= Madusanka =

Madusanka is a Sinhalese name that may refer to the following people:

Surname

- Amila Madusanka (born 1992), Sri Lankan cricketer
- Malka Madusanka (born 1995), Sri Lankan cricketer
- Pathum Madusanka (born 1996), Sri Lankan cricketer

== See also ==
- Madushanka (disambiguation)
