= Tharaka Gunawardena =

Sri Lankan cricketer (born 1995)

Personal information
- Born: 27 January 1995 (age 31)
- Source: Cricinfo, 14 January 2020

Tharaka Gunawardena (born 27 January 1995) is a Sri Lankan cricketer. He made his Twenty20 debut on 14 January 2020, for Lankan Cricket Club in the 2019–20 SLC Twenty20 Tournament. He made his first-class debut on 28 February 2020, for Kandy Customs Cricket Club in Tier B of the 2019–20 Premier League Tournament.
