= Ranmith Jayasena =

Sri Lankan cricketer (born 2000)

Personal information
- Full name: Samaraweera Kankanamlage Uddika Ranmith Jayasena
- Born: 8 April 2000 (age 26); Colombo, Sri Lanka
- Source: Cricinfo, 4 January 2020

Ranmith Jayasena (born 8 April 2000) is a Sri Lankan cricketer. He made his Twenty20 debut on 4 January 2020, for Tamil Union Cricket and Athletic Club in the 2019–20 SLC Twenty20 Tournament. He made his List A debut on 30 March 2021, for Tamil Union Cricket and Athletic Club in the 2020–21 Major Clubs Limited Over Tournament.
