= Dananjana de Silva =

Sri Lankan cricketer (born 1996)

Personal information
- Full name: Muthumuni Isuru Dananjana de Silva
- Born: 29 March 1996 (age 30)
- Batting: Right-handed
- Bowling: Right-arm medium
- Source: Cricinfo, 19 December 2019

Dananjana de Silva (born 29 March 1996) is a Sri Lankan cricketer. He made his first-class debut on 7 February 2019, for Tamil Union Cricket and Athletic Club in the 2018–19 Premier League Tournament. He made his List A debut on 19 December 2019, for Kurunegala Youth Cricket Club in the 2019–20 Invitation Limited Over Tournament. He made his Twenty20 debut on 6 January 2020, for Kurunegala Youth Cricket Club in the 2019–20 SLC Twenty20 Tournament.
