= Kanishka Madhushanka =

Sri Lankan cricketer (born 1997)

Personal information
- Born: 14 March 1997 (age 29)
- Source: Cricinfo, 8 January 2020

Kanishka Madhushanka (born 14 March 1997) is a Sri Lankan cricketer. He made his Twenty20 debut on 8 January 2020, for Sri Lanka Air Force Sports Club in the 2019–20 SLC Twenty20 Tournament.
