= Dilshan Kollure =

Sri Lankan cricketer (born 1997)

Personal information
- Full name: Dilshan Kollure
- Born: 18 December 1997 (age 28); Matale, Sri Lanka
- Batting: Left-handed
- Bowling: Right-arm leg break
- Source: Cricinfo, 17 December 2019

Dilshan Kollure (born 18 December 1997) is a Sri Lankan cricketer. He made his List A debut on 17 December 2019, for Kurunegala Youth Cricket Club in the 2019–20 Invitation Limited Over Tournament. He made his Twenty20 debut on 10 January 2020, for Kurunegala Youth Cricket Club in the 2019–20 SLC Twenty20 Tournament. He made his first-class debut on 31 January 2020, for Kurunegala Youth Cricket Club in Tier B of the 2019–20 Premier League Tournament.
