= Vinit Indulkar =

Indian cricketer (born 1984)

Personal information
- Full name: Vinit Ajit Indulkar
- Born: 26 September 1984 (age 41); Sholapur, Maharashtra
- Batting: Right-handed
- Bowling: Right-arm medium
- Role: Batsman

Domestic team information
- Years: Team
- 2004/05–2007/08: Mumbai
- 2008/09–2010/11: Himachal Pradesh
- 2011/12–2013/14: Mumbai
- 2019/20: Sri Lanka Police Sports Club
- Source: ESPNcricinfo, 14 May 2016

Vinit Ajit Indulkar (born 26 August 1984) is an Indian former cricketer. He played for Mumbai cricket team and Himachal Pradesh in 40 Ranji Trophy matches. He was born at Sholapur.
