= Sandun Fernando =

Sri Lankan cricketer (born 1999)

Personal information
- Born: 5 April 1999 (age 27)
- Source: Cricinfo, 14 January 2020

Sandun Fernando (born 5 April 1999) is a Sri Lankan cricketer. He made his Twenty20 debut on 14 January 2020, for Unichela Sports Club in the 2019–20 SLC Twenty20 Tournament.
