= Ashan Dilhara =

Sri Lankan cricketer (born 2001)

Personal information
- Full name: Balachandra Archchige Ashan Dilhara
- Born: 12 May 2001 (age 25); Panadura
- Batting: Left-handed
- Bowling: Right arm medium-fast
- Source: Cricinfo, 15 July 2020

Ahsan Dilhara (born 12 May 2001) is a Sri Lankan cricketer. He made his List A debut on 19 December 2019, for Panadura Sports Club in the 2019–20 Invitation Limited Over Tournament. He made his first-class debut for Panadura Sports Club in Tier B of the 2019–20 Premier League Tournament on 6 March 2020. He made his Twenty20 debut on 5 March 2021, for Panadura Sports Club in the 2020–21 SLC Twenty20 Tournament.
