= Thulina Dilshan =

Sri Lankan cricketer (born 1997)

Personal information
- Born: 17 March 1997 (age 29)
- Source: ESPNcricinfo, 30 December 2018

Thulina Dilshan (born 17 March 1997) is a Sri Lankan cricketer. He made his first-class debut for Sri Lanka Army Sports Club in the 2018–19 Premier League Tournament on 28 December 2018. He made his List A debut for Sri Lanka Army Sports Club in the 2018–19 Premier Limited Overs Tournament on 8 March 2019. He made his Twenty20 debut on 8 January 2020, for Sri Lanka Army Sports Club in the 2019–20 SLC Twenty20 Tournament.
