= Nishan Thilanka =

Sri Lankan cricketer (born 1991)

Personal information
- Born: 2 January 1991 (age 35)
- Source: Cricinfo, 6 January 2020

Nishan Thilanka (born 2 January 1991) is a Sri Lankan cricketer. He made his Twenty20 debut on 6 January 2020, for Unichela Sports Club in the 2019–20 SLC Twenty20 Tournament.
