= Rahul Gunasekera =

Sri Lankan cricketer (born 2001)

Personal information
- Born: 24 May 2001 (age 25)
- Source: Cricinfo, 15 December 2019

Rahul Gunasekera (born 24 May 2001) is a Sri Lankan cricketer. He made his List A debut on 15 December 2019, for Nugegoda Sports and Welfare Club in the 2019–20 Invitation Limited Over Tournament. He made his first-class debut on 13 March 2020, for Nugegoda Sports and Welfare Club in Tier B of the 2019–20 Premier League Tournament.
