= Ushan Imantha =

Sri Lankan cricketer (born 1999)

Personal information
- Born: 26 July 1999 (age 27)
- Source: Cricinfo, 6 January 2020

Ushan Imantha (born 26 July 1999) is a Sri Lankan cricketer. He made his Twenty20 debut on 6 January 2020, for Kandy Customs Cricket Club in the 2019–20 SLC Twenty20 Tournament.
