= Nimantha Gunasiri =

Sri Lankan cricketer (born 1996)

Personal information
- Born: 1 November 1996 (age 30)
- Source: Cricinfo, 3 February 2019

Nimantha Gunasiri (born 1 November 1996) is a Sri Lankan cricketer. He made his first-class debut for Burgher Recreation Club in the 2018–19 Premier League Tournament on 1 February 2019. He made his List A debut on 14 December 2019, for Burgher Recreation Club in the 2019–20 Invitation Limited Over Tournament.
