= Rajitha Wickramarachchi =

Sri Lankan cricketer (born 1987)

Personal information
- Full name: Kalubowilage Rajitha Sameera Wickramarachchi
- Born: 21 December 1987 (age 38); Kandy, Sri Lanka
- Source: ESPNcricinfo, 22 January 2017

Rajitha Wickramarachchi (born 21 December 1987) is a Sri Lankan cricketer. He made his first-class debut for Saracens Sports Club in the 2008–09 Premier Trophy on 14 November 2008. He made his Twenty20 debut on 12 January 2020, for Kandy Customs Cricket Club in the 2019–20 SLC Twenty20 Tournament.
