= Roanaka Ahangama =

Sri Lankan cricketer (born 1994)

Personal information
- Born: 14 May 1994 (age 32)
- Source: Cricinfo, 3 January 2020

Roanaka Ahangama (born 14 May 1994) is a Sri Lankan cricketer. He made his List A debut on 19 December 2019, for Galle Cricket Club in the 2019–20 Invitation Limited Over Tournament.
