= Tharindu Weerasinghe =

Sri Lankan cricketer (born 1983)

Personal information
- Born: 29 April 1983 (age 43)
- Source: Cricinfo, 19 December 2019

Tharindu Weerasinghe (born 29 April 1983) is a Sri Lankan cricketer. He made his first-class debut on 7 November 2003, for Police Sports Club in the 2003–04 Premier Trophy.
