= Inshaka Siriwardena =

Sri Lankan cricketer (born 2000)

Personal information
- Born: 9 January 2000 (age 26)
- Source: Cricinfo, 5 March 2021

Inshaka Siriwardena (born 9 January 2000) is a Sri Lankan cricketer. He made his List A debut on 17 December 2019, for Kalutara Town Club in the 2019–20 Invitation Limited Over Tournament. He made his Twenty20 debut on 4 January 2020, for Kalutara Town Club in the 2019–20 SLC Twenty20 Tournament. He made his first-class debut on 31 January 2020, for Kalutara Town Club in the 2019–20 Premier League Tournament Tier B.
