= Danushka Sandaruwan =

Sri Lankan cricketer (born 1993)

Personal information
- Born: 29 September 1993 (age 33)
- Source: Cricinfo, 10 January 2020

Danushka Sandaruwan (born 29 September 1993) is a Sri Lankan cricketer. He made his Twenty20 debut on 10 January 2020, for Negombo Cricket Club in the 2019–20 SLC Twenty20 Tournament. He made his first-class debut for Negombo Cricket Club in the 2019–20 Premier League Tournament on 22 August 2020. He made his List A debut on 28 March 2021, for Negombo Cricket Club in the 2020–21 Major Clubs Limited Over Tournament.
