= Kevin Perera =

Sri Lankan cricketer (born 2000)

Personal information
- Born: 20 April 2000 (age 26)
- Source: Cricinfo, 8 January 2020

Kevin Perera (born 20 April 2000) is a Sri Lankan cricketer. He made his Twenty20 debut on 8 January 2020, for Lankan Cricket Club in the 2019–20 SLC Twenty20 Tournament. He made his first-class debut for Lankan Cricket Club in the 2019–20 Premier League Tournament on 16 August 2020. He made his List A debut on 1 April 2021, for Lankan Cricket Club in the 2020–21 Major Clubs Limited Over Tournament.
