= Keon Joseph =

Guyanese cricketer (born 1991)

Personal information
- Full name: Keon Andre Joseph
- Born: 25 November 1991 (age 34); Guyana
- Batting: Right-handed
- Bowling: Right-arm fast-medium

Domestic team information
- Years: Team
- 2010–2017: Guyana

Career statistics
Competition	FC	List A
Matches	46	5
Runs scored	186	6
Batting average	5.31	3.00
100s/50s	0/0	0/0
Top score	20	4
Balls bowled	5,488	158
Wickets	110	4
Bowling average	27.67	36.25
5 wickets in innings	1	0
10 wickets in match	0	0
Best bowling	7/53	4/24
Catches/stumpings	14/0	0/0
- Source: , 9 October 2021

Keon Andre Joseph (born 25 November 1991) is a Guyanese cricketer who has played for the Guyanese national side in West Indian domestic cricket.

A right-arm fast bowler, Joseph played for the West Indies under-19s at the 2010 Under-19 World Cup. The previous year, he had also played a single match for the team at the 2009–10 WICB President's Cup, which held List A status. Joseph's first-class debut for Guyana came in February 2010, against the Windward Islands in the 2009–10 Regional Four Day Competition. In October 2016, he was selected to tour Sri Lanka with West Indies A, playing three matches against Sri Lanka A.

He signed with the New England Eagles for the Minor League Cricket season in July 2021.
