= Pasindu Dilshan =

Sri Lankan cricketer (born 1996)

Personal information
- Born: 2 October 1996 (age 30)
- Source: Cricinfo, 10 January 2020

Pasindu Dilshan (born 2 October 1996) is a Sri Lankan cricketer. He made his Twenty20 debut on 10 January 2020, for Galle Cricket Club in the 2019–20 SLC Twenty20 Tournament.
