= Nimantha Perera =

Sri Lankan cricketer (born 1981)

Nimantha Perera (born Kariyapperuma Athukoralage Sajeewa Nimantha Perera on 9 November 1981) is a Sri Lankan cricketer. He is a right-handed batsman and right-arm off-break bowler who plays for Police Sports Club. He was born in Ampara.

Perera has made a single first-class appearance for the side, in the 2008–09 season, against Panadura Sports Club. He scored 9 runs in the first innings in which he batted, and three runs in the second. He also played in one List A match in the same season.
