= Danushka Madushanka =

Sri Lankan cricketer (born 1990)

Personal information
- Born: 1 August 1990 (age 36)
- Source: Cricinfo, 6 January 2020

Danushka Madushanka (born 1 August 1990) is a Sri Lankan cricketer. He made his Twenty20 debut on 6 January 2020, for Unichela Sports Club in the 2019–20 SLC Twenty20 Tournament.
