= Kalindu Siriwardana =

Sri Lankan cricketer (born 2000)

Personal information
- Born: 3 January 2000 (age 26)
- Source: Cricinfo, 6 January 2020

Kalindu Siriwardana (born 3 January 2000) is a Sri Lankan cricketer. He made his Twenty20 debut on 6 January 2020, for Kurunegala Youth Cricket Club in the 2019–20 SLC Twenty20 Tournament. He made his List A debut on 28 March 2021, for Sri Lanka Air Force Sports Club in the 2020–21 Major Clubs Limited Over Tournament.
