= Buddhi Siriwardene =

Sri Lankan air officer

- Military career
- Allegiance: Sri Lanka
- Branch: Sri Lanka Air Force
- Service years: 1959 - 1992
- Rank: Air Commodore
- Commands: Base Commander Katunayake
- Awards: VSV; Purna Bhumi Padakkama

Air Commodore Buddhi Siriwardene (also known as Buddhananda Siriwardene) VSV was an air officer of the Sri Lanka Air Force.

== Early life and education ==
Buddhi was educated at Nalanda College Colombo and joined the then Royal Ceylon Air Force as a Pilot Officer in 1959.

== Military career ==
Buddhi gradually rose to the rank of Air Commodore at the time of his retirement in 1992. While at Sri Lanka Air Force he held important assignments such as Senior Administrative Officer - Royal Ceylon Air Force - Diyatalawa, Officer Commanding Personnel Services of Royal Ceylon Air Force - China Bay, Base commander of Sri Lanka Air Force Base Katunayake. During his tenure at Air Force he was decorated with Sri Lanka Armed Services Long Service Medal, Sri Lanka Air Force 25th Anniversary Medal, Republic of Sri Lanka Armed Services Medal, Purna Bhumi Padakkama and Vishista Seva Vibhushanaya

== Civilian appointments ==
Buddhi Siriwardene also held the position of Deputy Commissioner of Essential Services in the Rehabilitation Ministry, Assistant Manager of the Sri Lanka National Soccer Team, President of the Sri Lanka Badminton Association, Hony. Treasurer of the Football Federation of Sri Lanka and the Vice President of the National Olympic Committee.
