= Keshan Wijerathne =

Sri Lankan cricketer (born 1996)

Personal information
- Born: 28 March 1996 (age 30); Kurunegala, Sri Lanka
- Source: ESPNcricinfo, 21 December 2016

Keshan Wijerathne (born 28 March 1996) is a Sri Lankan cricketer. He made his first-class debut for Colts Cricket Club in the 2016–17 Premier League Tournament on 21 December 2016.
