= Dilshan Abeysinghe =

Sri Lankan cricketer (born 1996)

Personal information
- Full name: Abesinghe Mudiyanselage Chathuranga Dilshan Abeysinghe
- Born: 17 April 1996 (age 30); Dambulla, Sri Lanka
- Source: ESPNcricinfo, 15 February 2017

Dilshan Abeysinghe is a Sri Lankan cricketer. He made his first-class debut for Sinhalese Sports Club in the 2016–17 Premier League Tournament on 14 February 2017. He made his Twenty20 debut for Chilaw Marians Cricket Club in the 2018–19 SLC Twenty20 Tournament on 21 February 2019. He made his List A debut on 14 December 2019, for Panadura Sports Club in the 2019–20 Invitation Limited Over Tournament. In March 2021, he was part of the Sinhalese Sports Club team that won the 2020–21 SLC Twenty20 Tournament, the first time they had won the tournament since 2005.
