= Navod Madushanka Weeratunga =

Sri Lankan cricketer (born 1996)

Personal information
- Born: 22 August 1996 (age 30)
- Source: Cricinfo, 10 January 2020

Navod Madushanka Weeratunga (born 22 August 1996) is a Sri Lankan cricketer. He made his Twenty20 debut on 10 January 2020, for Sri Lanka Air Force Sports Club in the 2019–20 SLC Twenty20 Tournament.
