= Imesh Madushanka =

Sri Lankan cricketer (born 1998)

Personal information
- Born: 29 March 1998 (age 28)
- Source: Cricinfo, 22 December 2019

Imesh Madushanka (born 29 March 1998) is a Sri Lankan cricketer. He made his List A debut on 22 December 2019, for Kandy Customs Cricket Club in the 2019–20 Invitation Limited Over Tournament.
