= Vimukthi Perera =

Sri Lankan cricketer (born 1989)

Vimukthi Perera (full name Nawagamuwage Vimukthi Ramesh Perera; born 14 November 1989) is a Sri Lankan cricketer. He is a left-handed batsman and left-arm medium-fast bowler who plays for Moors Sports Club. He was born in Colombo.

Perera made his cricketing debut for Sri Lanka Schools in the 2008-09 Inter-Provincial Twenty20 Tournament.

Perera played for Moors Under-23s during the 2009 season, making his debut against Saracens Under-23s. In the first innings in which he bowled, he took figures of 5-36.

In August 2018, he was named in Galle's squad the 2018 SLC T20 League.
