= Prathapa Siriwardene =

Sri Lankan cricketer (born 1989)

Prathapa Siriwardene (born 2 July 1989) is a Sri Lankan cricketer. He is a right-handed batsman and right-arm medium-fast bowler who plays for Singha Sports Club. He was born in Galle.

Siriwardene made his List A debut during the 2009–10 season, against Seeduwa Raddoluwa. From the tailend, he scored 7 runs. He took figures of 0–19 with the ball from two overs of bowling.
