= Nugegoda Sports and Welfare Club =

Sri Lankan first-class cricket club

- League: Major League Tournament

Personnel
- Captain: Tillakaratne Sampath

Team information
- City: Nugegoda, Sri Lanka
- Founded: 1970

History
- First-class debut: vs Kalutara Town Club in 2020 at Aaron's Cricket Club Ground, Kalutara District
- ML wins: 0
- MC LO wins: 0
- MC T20 wins: 0

Nugegoda Sports and Welfare Club, commonly abbreviated as NSWC, is a first-class cricket club based in Nugegoda, Sri Lanka. It is one of the 14 affiliated clubs of Sri Lanka Cricket. Tillakaratne Sampath is the current captain of the club.

== History ==
Nugegoda Sports and Welfare Club was founded in 1970. NSWC sought an interim injunction against the interim committee from preventing using the Board of Control for Cricket funds in Sri Lanka in 2001. Before its first-class debut, NSWC participated in the under-23 tournament since 2002. Nuwan Kulasekara played for NSWC in the under-23 tournament in the early days of his career.

Nugegoda Sports and Welfare Club made its first-class debut in 2020. NSWC played against Kalutara Town Club in Aaron's Cricket Club Ground in the 2019–20 Premier League Tournament Tier B. NSWC secured a 119-run win in its first match, and Denuwan Rajakaruna captained the side.

== Honours ==
- Major League (0):
- Major Clubs Limited Overs (0):
- Major Clubs T20 (0):

== Current squad ==
- Pulindu Perera
- Tillakaratne Sampath (c)
- Rahal Amarasinghe
- Avishka Perera
- Kevin Perera
- Rahul Gunasekera
- Supun Kavinda
- Akram Muthalib (wk)
- Manuja Chanthuka
- Dilshan Abeysinghe
- Sheshan Marasinghe

Source: ESPN Cricinfo
