= Welagedara Stadium =

Cricket stadium in Kurunegala, Sri Lanka

Coordinates: 7.4923°N 80.3676°E

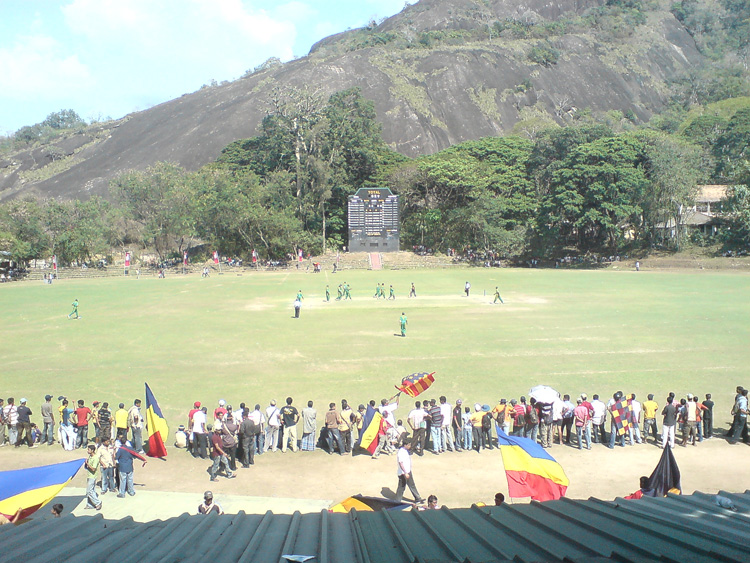
- Interactive map of Welagedara Stadium

Ground information
- Location: Kurunegala, North Western Province
- Country: Sri Lanka
- Establishment: 1972
- Capacity: 10,000
- Tenants: Wayamba (cricket)
- End names
- City End; Swimming Pool End

International information
- First women's ODI: 5 May 2008: India v Pakistan
- Last women's ODI: 11 May 2008: Sri Lanka v India

Team information
Wayamba	(1990 – present)
Kurunegala Youth Cricket Club
- As of 2 September 2020; Source: Cricinfo

Welagedara Stadium (Sinhala: වෙලගෙදර ක්‍රීඩාංගණය , Tamil: வெலகெதர விலையாட்டு அரங்கம்) is a multi-use stadium that has hosted international and local cricket matches and other events in Kurunegala, Sri Lanka. The stadium can hold at least 10,000 spectators. It has regularly hosted international tour matches, unofficial test matches and U19 one-day games.

The stadium is beside the Kurunegala-Dambulla Road, Kurunegala, 95 km away from the capital, Colombo. The giant Elephant Rock nearby provides a dramatic backdrop.

== Further information ==
Although the stadium was officially in 1972 by then Minister of Home Affairs, Justice Felix Dias Bandaranaike, its history dates back to the British colonial period. It hosted its first international-level match under the name Welagedara Stadium in February 1895, when a Sri Lanka Colts XI faced the touring Pakistanis.

The venue staged matches during the 2000 Under-19 Cricket World Cup and the 2008 Women's Asia Cup. Since the 1980s, it has hosted numerous international List A games, U-19 fixtures, Unofficial Test matches, and many domestic club matches. The Battle of the Rocks is, a long-standing rivalry between Maliyadeva College and St. Anne's College, Kurunegala also The Battle of the Tuskers rivalry between Maliyadeva Adarsha Maha Vidyalaya and Ibbagamuwa Central College is regularly played here, as is the Battle of the Greens between Royal College Wayamba, Kurunegala, and Sir John Kothalawala College. Notable cricketers such as Rangana Herath, Lanka de Silva, and Eric Upashantha played at the stadium in their younger days.

== Gallery ==
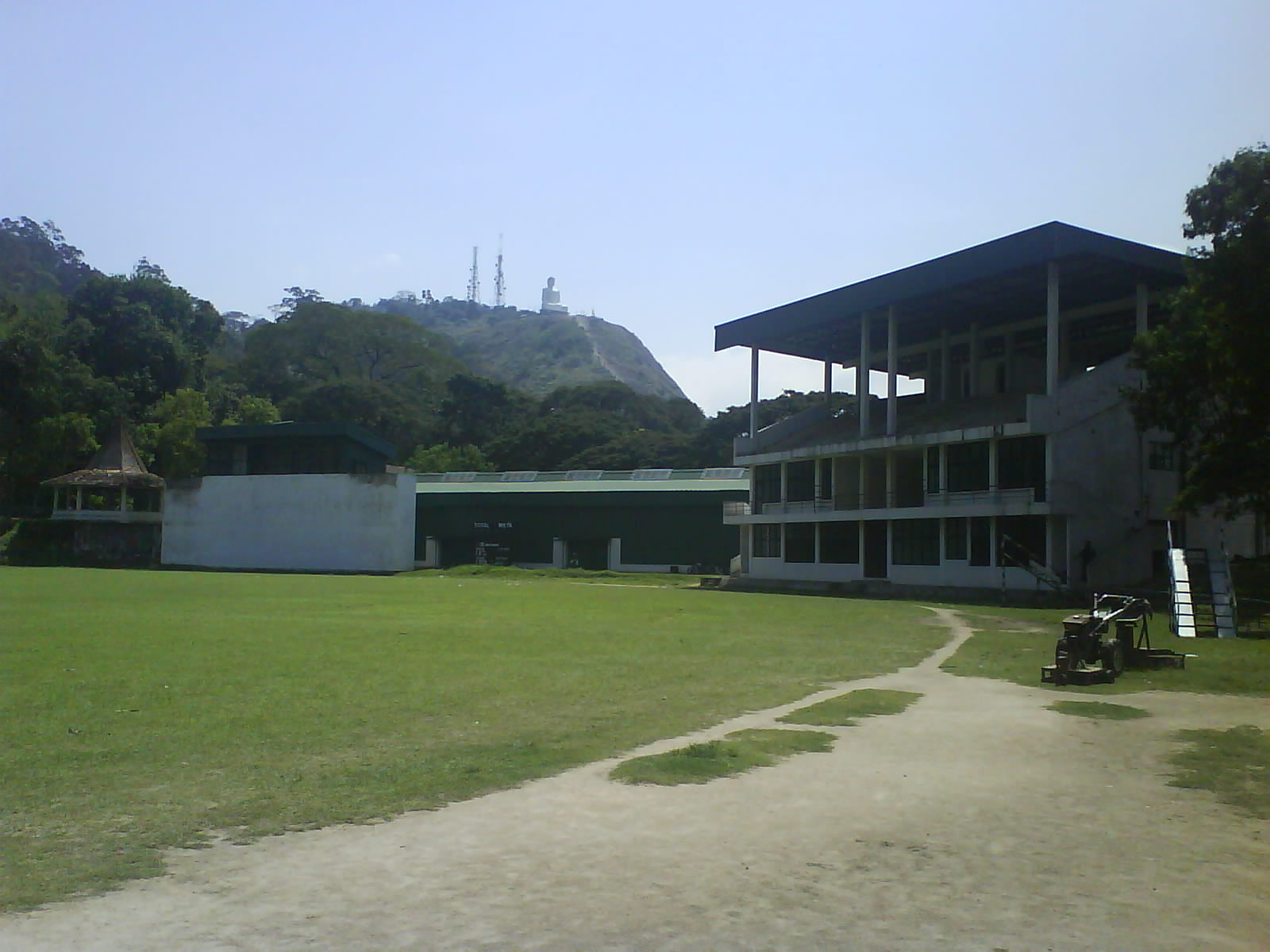

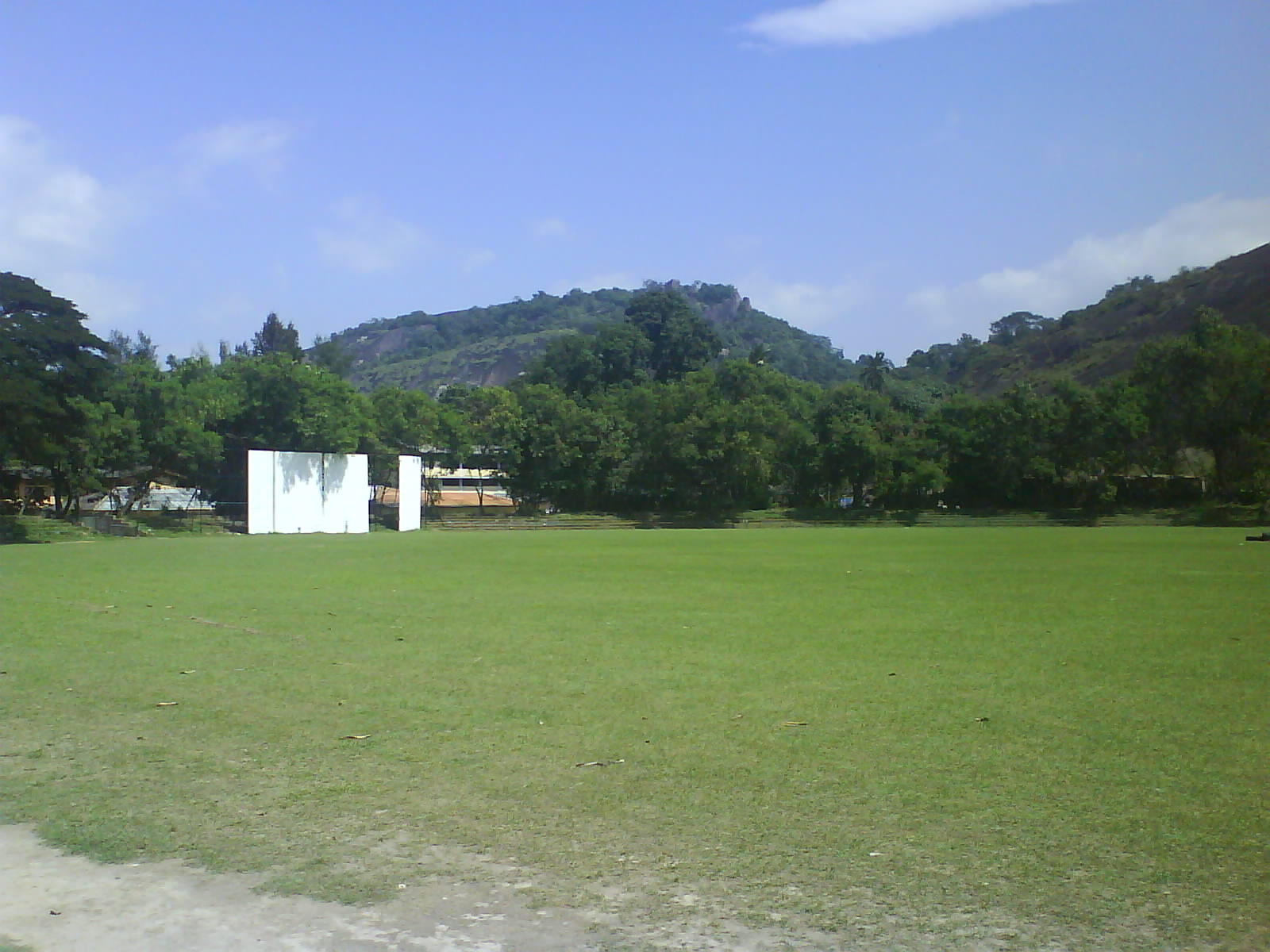

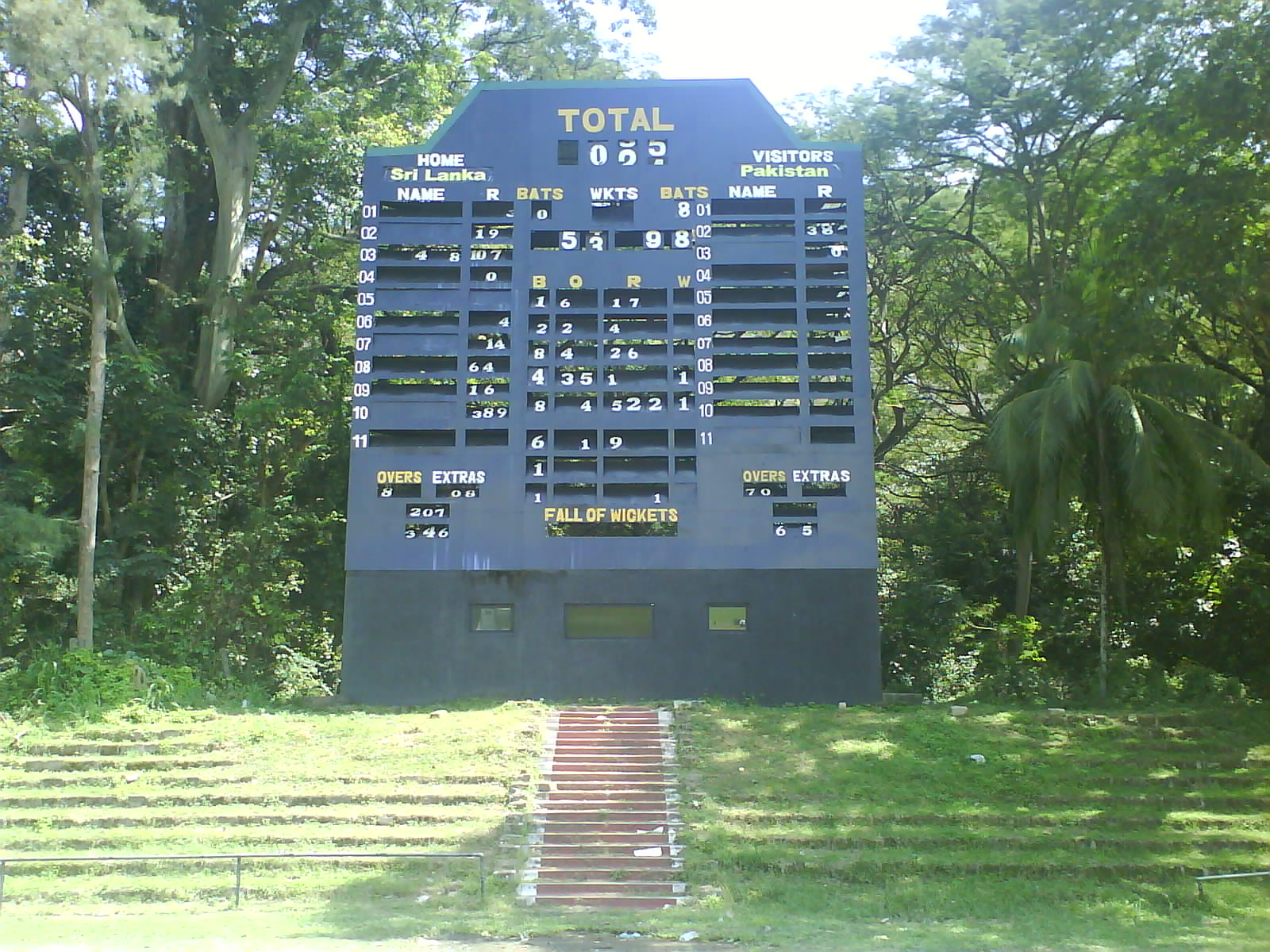

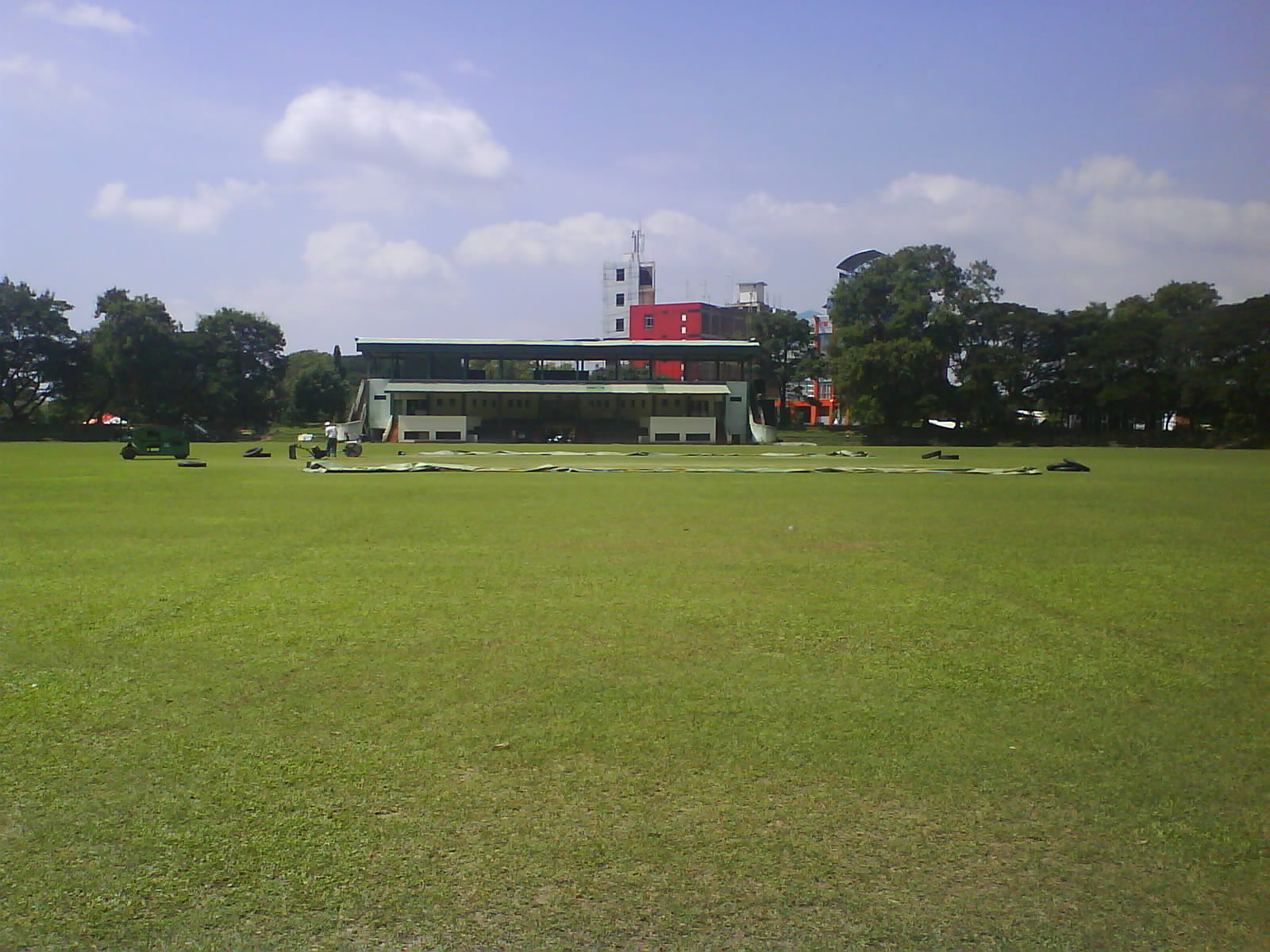
