= List of Maliyadeva College alumni =

This is a list of notable alumni from Maliyadeva College, which is located in Kurunegala, Sri Lanka.

Name	Notability	Ref.
T. M. Jayaratne	Singer	
Piyadasa Wijesinghe	Member of Parliament	
Ranjith Madurasinghe	International cricketer (1988 – 1992)	
Eric Upashantha	International cricketer (1995 – 2002)	
Rangana Herath	International cricketer (1999 – 2018)	
Jeevantha Kulatunga	International cricketer (2008)	
Minod Bhanuka	International cricketer (2019 – present)	
Asikur Rahuman	International footballer	
Sarath Munasinghe	Sri Lankan army general	
S. B. Nawinne	Member of Parliament (Kurunegala District) (1989 – present)	
Lakshman Senewiratne	Member of Parliament (Badulla District) (1977 – present)	
Athula Wijesinghe	Chief Minister of North Western Provincial Council (2002 – 2013)	
Daya Ratnayake	General – former Commander of Sri Lankan Army (2013 – 2015)	
Ananda Hamangoda †	Major General – former Jaffna Military Commander (killed by an LTTE suicide attack on 4 July 1996 in Jaffna)	
Jayantha Kelegama	Sri Lankan economist	
Rangana Premaratne	Sri Lankan film/teledrama actor, producer and television personality	
Dayan Rajapakse	Sri Lankan physician, educator and businessman	
Bogoda Seelawimala Thera	Founder of American Buddhist Seminary	
P. B. Jayasundera	Secretary of the President	
Jayantha Jayasuriya	Chief Justice of Sri Lanka	
