= Maliyadeva =

Sri Lankan buddhist monk

Maliyadeva was a monk who is said to have lived in Sri Lanka during the 2nd century BCE and to have attained nirvana.

According to the Mahavamsa, part of Theravādin tradition, Maliyadeva was the last well-known arhat who had high psychic powers ( Abiññalabhi: in Sinhala:අභිඥ්ඥාලාභී අරහතුන් වහන්සේ ) in Sri Lanka and Buddhism in Sri Lanka declined after this period. A legend says he brought four Buddha statues from India to Sri Lanka.

His meditation chamber may be seen at Arankale and his dwelling place at Guharamaya. According to folklore, Arahant Maliyadeva is said to have lived in Ravanagoda, Kotmale.

== See also ==
- Maliyadeva College, Sri Lanka
- Maliyadeva Girls' College, Sri Lanka
- Phra Malai
