= Kurunegala Clock Tower =

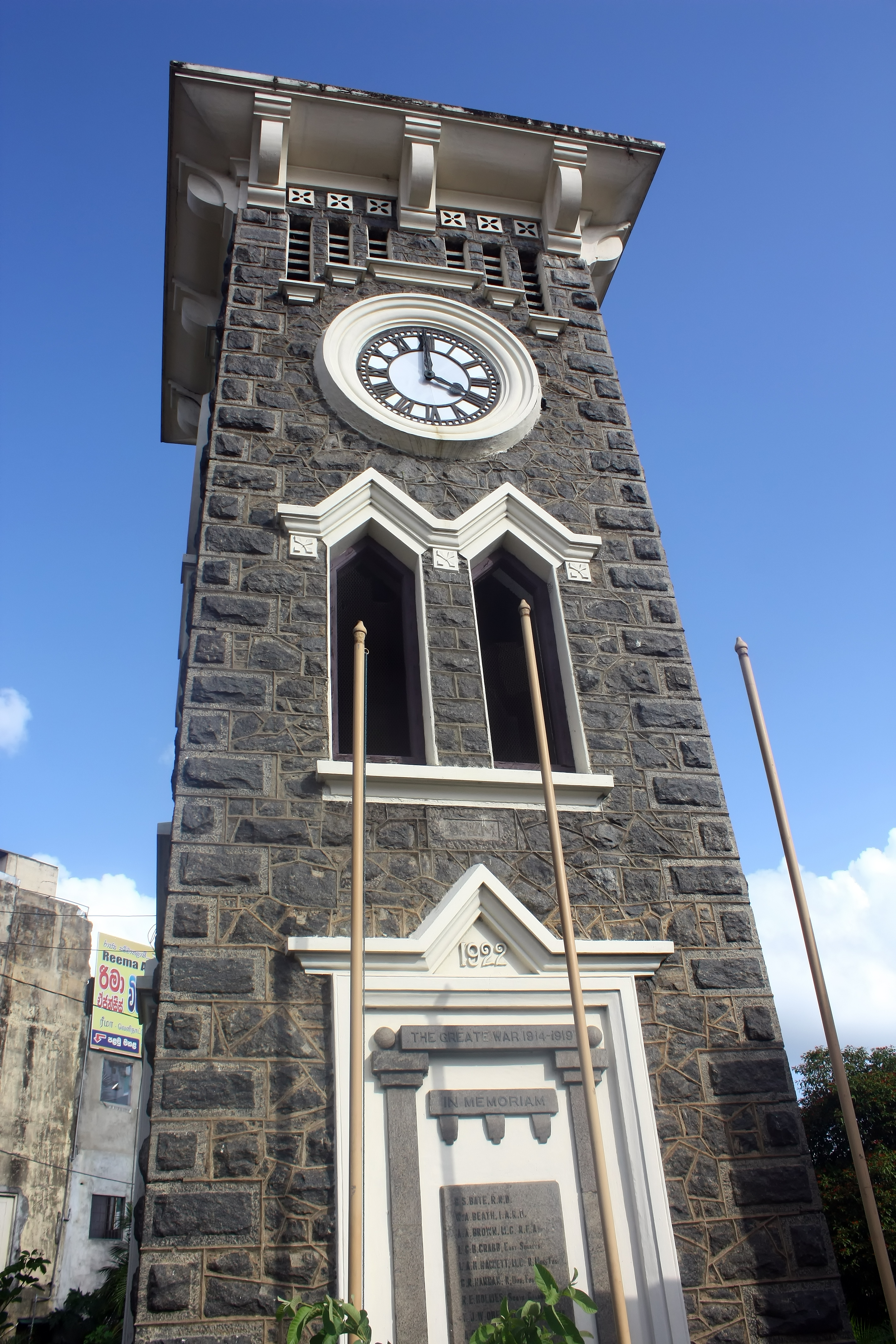
- Kurunegala Clock Tower
- Interactive map of Kurunegala Clock Tower
- Location: Kurunegala, Sri Lanka
- Coordinates: 7°29′12.8″N 80°21′54.3″E
- Material: Granite stone, cement, wood
- Completion date: 1922
- Dedicated to: North Western Province soldiers who died in both World Wars

The Kurunegala Clock Tower is located in the heart of Kurunegala, Sri Lanka. The clock tower was built in 1922 in memory of the soldiers from North Western Province who participated in the First World War and died. The Kurunegala Court of Law, The Central Market and the Central Bus Stand are also near the clock tower.

== History ==
Eleven soldiers from the North Western Province were killed in the First World War (1914–1918), including three Sri Lankans. The tower was erected to honor them, and a memorial plaque on the tower has the following inscribed:

"This Clock Tower was erected in memory of those who went from the North Western province at the call of duty and gave their lives for the empire in the World War in 1914–1918"

Soon after 1945, the tower was also dedicated to the valiant officers who sacrificed their lives in the Second World War (1939–1945).

== Features ==
Quadrangular shape clock tower is constructed with granite stone, cement and wood. The entire tower, especially the top, appears similar to a quadrangular castle. There are concrete and wooden steps inside.
