= Eric Upashantha =

Sri Lankan cricketer (born 1972)

Personal information
- Full name: Kalutarage Eric Amila Upashantha
- Born: 10 June 1972 (age 54); Kurunegala, Sri Lanka
- Batting: Right-handed
- Bowling: Right-arm fast-medium
- Role: Batsman

International information
- National side: Sri Lanka (1995–2002)
- Test debut (cap 75): 24 February 1999 v India
- Last Test: 13 June 2002 v England
- ODI debut (cap 87): 3 October 1995 v Pakistan
- Last ODI: 3 February 2001 v New Zealand

Domestic team information
- Years: Team
- 1990/91–2003: Colts Cricket Club

Career statistics
Competition	Test	ODI
Matches	2	12
Runs scored	10	49
Batting average	3.33	7.00
100s/50s	0/0	0/0
Top score	6	15
Balls bowled	306	564
Wickets	4	12
Bowling average	50.00	40.08
5 wickets in innings	0	0
10 wickets in match	0	0
Best bowling	2/41	4/37
Catches/stumpings	0/–	2/–
- Source: Cricinfo, 9 February 2006

Kalutarage Eric Amila Upashantha (commonly known as Eric Upashantha; born 10 June 1972) is a Sri Lankan former cricketer, who played two Test matches and 12 One Day Internationals for Sri Lanka. He was educated at Maliyadeva College, Kurunegala. He is a right-handed batsman and a right-arm medium-fast bowler.

He bowled a considerable line and length, and played well against seam bowlers. Upashantha played Twenty20 cricket in 2004 and List A cricket the following season. He made his Twenty20 debut on 17 August 2004, for Colts Cricket Club in the 2004 SLC Twenty20 Tournament.

== International career ==
Upashantha had been at the edge of the Sri Lankan team for several years, having made his One Day International debut in 1995–1996. Without action in the intervening three years, he reappeared in the 1999 Asian Test Championship before his debut Test against India. He has also participated in the Pepsi Cup and 1999 Cricket World Cup.

Since 2000 he has only sporadically played for Sri Lanka, being generally second choice in his position in the team to Dilhara Fernando as the back-up to Chaminda Vaas.
