= Sir John Kothalawala College =

School in Kurunegala, Sri Lanka

- ශ්‍රීමත් ජෝන් කොතලාවල විද්‍යාලය

Location
- Dambulla Road; Kurunegala; Kurunegala, Sri Lanka, North Western Province, Sri Lanka; Sri Lanka
- Coordinates: 7°29′40″N 80°22′08″E

Information
- Type: Government School
- Motto: Vidya Sarvashya Bhushanam (විද්‍යා සර්වශ්‍ය භූෂණම්)[උගත් කම සෑමකල්හිම ආභාරණයයි] (Knowledge is the jewel of all time)
- Founded: 14 February 1974
- School district: Kurunegala Education Zone
- Authority: Ministry of Education
- Principal: D. W. D. Dehipagoda
- Grades: Class 1–13
- Gender: Mixed
- Age range: 6–19
- Enrollment: 6,000+
- Language: English and Sinhalese
- Houses: Vijaya, Gemunu, Thissa, Perakum
- Colours: Blue, red, green and yellow
- Nickname: JOHNZ

Sir John Kothalawala College (Sir John Kothalawala Maha Vidyalaya) is a public college in the city of Kurunegala, Sri Lanka. It was established on 16 January 1974 and was formerly known as Bandaranayake Vidyalaya.

== History ==
Sir John Kothalawala College opened on 16 January 1974 in the palace of Anglican Bishop Lakdasa De Mel. At that time, the bishop's palace was used for classrooms. The college was initially known as Bandaranayake Vidyalaya and was under the sponsorship of Piyadasa Wijesinghe, a former member of parliament. The objective in the establishment of the school was to provide more opportunities for youth from rural communities, away from overcrowded and competitive popular schools. The college opened with six teachers and fourteen students. With 175 teachers and 4600 students, it is the largest school in North Western Province.

== School Flag ==
The school flag is mainly coloured green, the official colour of the school. The school crest is at the bottom of the flag. There are four coloured strips, in the colours of the four school houses, at the hoist of the flag.

== Principals ==
Name	Entered Office	Departed Office
H. M. Premarathne Hitinayake	6 January 1974	8 October 1977
S. W. R. T. B. Gannoruwa	8 October 1977	1 July 1983
K. M. A. Kulathunga	1 July 1983	20 April 1993
S. B. Senevirathne	20 April 1993	4 April 1995
J. Rathnayake	4 April 1995	28 January 2008
Samaranayake Mallikarachchi	28 January 2008	6 October 2011
W. M. Saman Indrarathne	6 October 2011	24 July 2014
H. M. Gunapala	24 July 2014	6 July 2015
D. W. D. Dehipagoda	6 July 2015

== Past Names of the school ==
Year	Name
1974	Bandaranayake College
1977	President's College (Primary)
Present	Sir John Kothalawala College

== Sports ==
=== Annual Big Match ===
The Battle of Greens is the annual big cricket match between Sir John Kothalawala College and Royal College Wayamba, Kurunegala at Welagedara Stadium. Sir John Kothalawala College won the last match in 2016.

=== Annual Sports Meet ===
There is an annual sporting meet. Students are divided into four houses: Thissa, Vijaya, Gemunu, and Perakum.

=== Notable Achievements ===
- Top 10 Men's 400m, Youth Olympic 2018 - Dilan Bogoda
