= Kurunegala train crash =

2001 railway incident in Sri Lanka

The Yattalgoda train crash was an accident on a Sri Lankan rail line near the town of Kurunegala at around 2:45pm local time on 18 August 2001.

The Udarata Menike express passenger service from Badulla to Colombo Fort in Sri Lanka was a regular train route which ran on to Colombo. On the day of the accident, the train was grossly overcrowded, with hundreds of people clinging to the roof and sideboards because there was no room inside. The train was running over a newly repaired and replaced section of track at high speed, when the engine suddenly derailed at a bend, dragging three coaches with it.

Local people and emergency services made their way to the wreckage, and were able to pull many of the injured out of it. It did not catch fire, and the line was cleared rapidly. Fifteen people were killed in the crash, mostly among those who had been hanging onto the running boards and had been crushed by the falling train carriages. There were also at least forty people seriously injured in the crash, who were treated at local hospitals.

The accident was reported to be the result of the newly laid track, the gravel base of which had not had a chance to settle and harden through the passage of trains overhead. The train driver had not been informed of this, and so allowed a high speed on his extremely over-weight train, which caused the derailment when the gravel bed shifted after the engine had passed.

Sri Lanka holds the record for the worst ever train accident, the Queen of the Sea train disaster in 2004.
