= Ethagala =

Natural landmark in Sri Lanka

Coordinates: 7°29′06″N 80°22′11″E

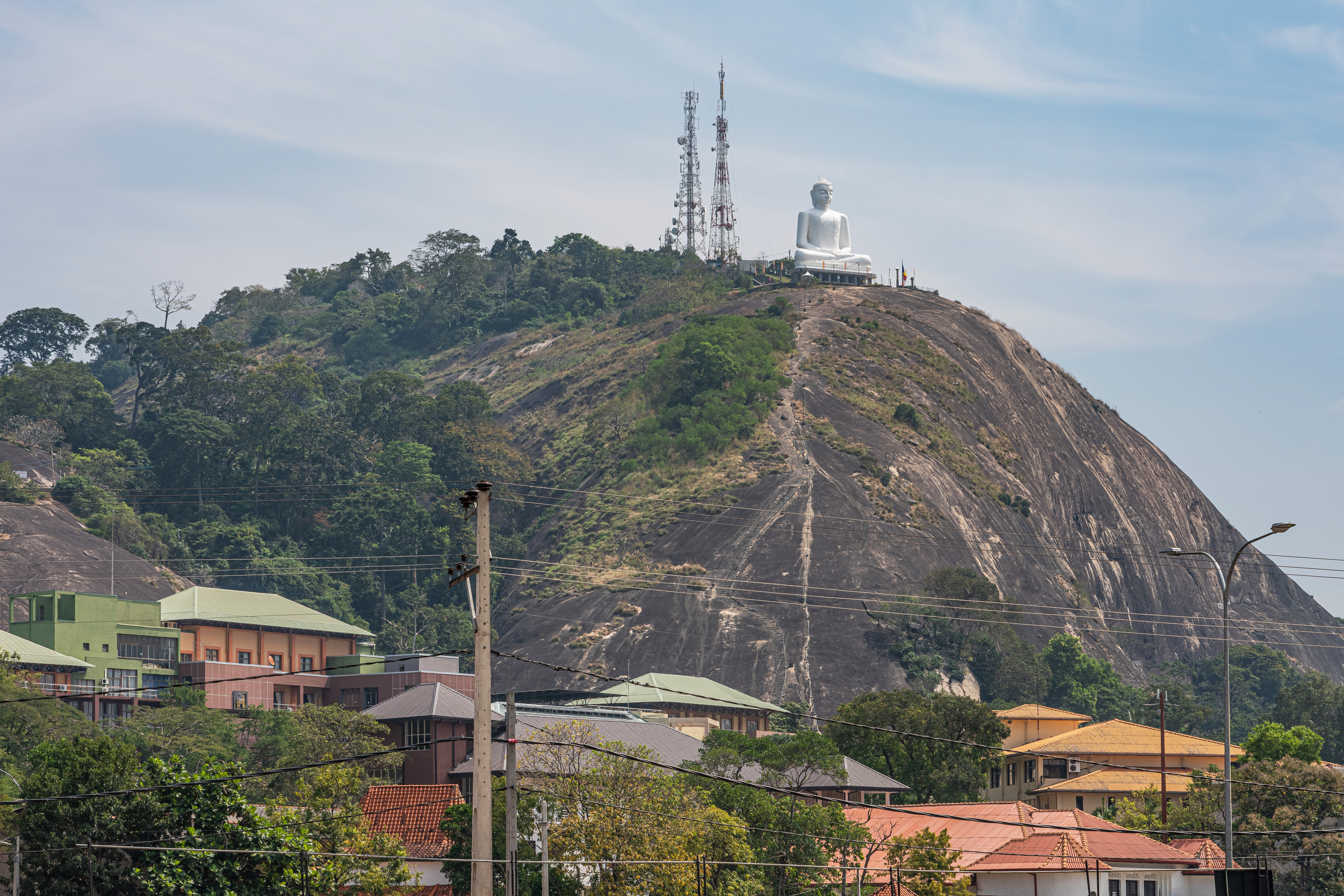
Ethagala with the statue of the Buddha on top

Ethagala (Sinhala: ඇතාගල) (English:Elephant Rock) is one of seven rocks that overlook the town of Kurunegala, in Sri Lanka. The rock face reaches 316 metres (1,037 ft) over the town and in its shape resembles a crouching elephant, which explains the rock's name. It houses a temple, the Athugala Viharaya, and an 27 m (88 ft) high seated Buddha statue at its top.
