= Maliyadeva Girls' College =

Maliyadeva Balika Vidyalaya
- මලියදේව බාලිකා විද්‍යාලය
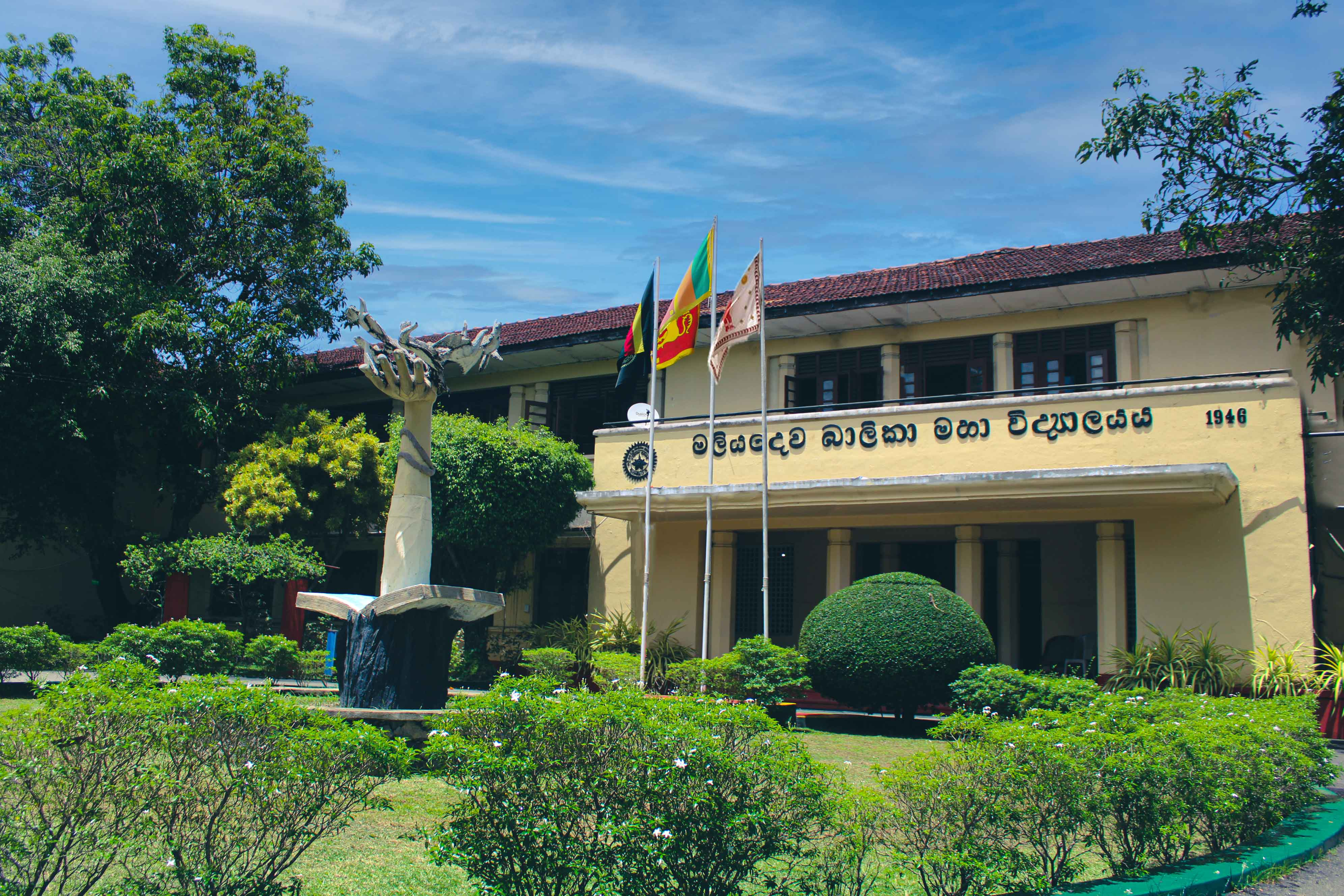

Location
- Colombo Road , Kurunegala; Kurunegala; Sri Lanka
- Coordinates: 7°29′14″N 80°21′35″E

Information
- Type: Public school
- Motto: Pali: ආලෝකෝ උදපාදී Aloko Udapādi (Light Arose)
- Established: 1 July 1946
- Founder: C. E. V. Fernando
- Status: 1AB
- Principal: Nirodha Abeywickrama
- Staff: 350+
- Teaching staff: 300+
- Grades: Class 1 – 13
- Gender: Girls
- Age: 6 to 19
- Enrollment: 5500+
- Capacity: 300+
- Language: Sinhala , English , Tamil
- Colours: Gold and Green
- Nickname: MBV
- Alumni: Devians
- Website: https://maliyadevabalika.lk/
- Last updated: 2023

Maliyadeva Girls' College (Sinhala: මලියදේව බාලිකා විද්‍යාලය) is a national Buddhist school in Sri Lanka situated in Kurunegala.

== History ==
Maliyadeva Girls' College was founded on 1 July 1946 by two teachers. It had 69 students and at the beginning was led by Mr. C. E. V. Fernando, who was the acting principal.

The school is closely tied to Maliyadeva College, also known as "Kurunegala Buddhist Institution", which was founded in 1888 in Bodhiraja Mawatha. The school later moved to Athkanda Vihara and was considered the foundation of Maliyadeva Balika Vidyalaya.

In 1928, Maliyadeva College shifted to its present location on Negombo Road, on land owned by Godfrey Madawala. The main building was built in 1938 with the support of Sir John Kotelawala, the Senate member from Kurunegala at that time. In 1941, Maliyadeva College was registered as a mixed school because there wasn't yet a Buddhist girls' school in Kurunegala.

In 1942, due to the Second World War, the school buildings and land were taken over by the Army. The school was then moved back to its previous location at Ethkanda Viharaya. The primary section of Maliyadeva College was moved to a new location along Colombo–Kurunegala road in 1944, and this later became the Maliyadeva Girls' College.

The land on Colombo Road – on which Maliyadeva Girls' College is situated today – was purchased in 1943 by Sir John Kothalawala, president of YMBA Kurunegala, and was owned by the Young Men's Buddhist Association (YMBA). At the annual meeting of the YMBA, it was decided to transfer the ownership of this land to the government in order to build Maliyadeva Girls' College.

== Past Principles ==
Mrs.Wimala De Silva (1946-1947)

Mrs. Hilda Kularathne (1949-1951)

Mrs.A.C.C.Dodanwala (1951)

Mrs. Wimala De Silva (1951-1953)

Mrs. Hema Jayasinghe (1953-1958)

Mrs.Iryne Abeysekara (1959-1964)

Mrs.Padmini Fonseka (1967-1970)

Mrs .Soma Munindradasa (1971-1974)

Mrs.L.G.W.Hewawasam (1975-1995)

Miss D.C.Halpe (1995 )

Mrs.H.R.Senevirathne (1995 - 1996)

Mrs.Sumedha Mudunna (1996)

Mrs.Y.M.K.Amarasinghe (1996 - 1998)

Mrs. Chandra Rathnawali (1999- 2000)

Mrs. K.A.Vajira Kumarihamy (2000 - 2012)

Mrs. Mrs. Soma rathnayake (2012 - 2019)

Mrs. Dumindra Wedande (2019 - 2021)

Mrs. Nirodha Abeywickrama (2021 to present)

== School Anthem ==
සොමි රැස විහිදෙන අඹර සරා දිළි

තරිඳු බඳුව බබළන සම්මානිත

සත්කෝරළ ඇතුගල්පුර මලිදෙව්

කුමරි මහා විදුහල් ජනනී……….

ශාස්ත්‍ර කලා විදු කිරණින් බැබලී

ආලෝකෝ උදපාදී දසුනින්

මහරු පුබුදු ගුණ සුවඳ හමා

යහගති මිණි මුතු අබරණ වී

සොමිරැස විහිදෙන……..

දෑකුළ ආගම් රුදු බේදා

දුරුකර සැම එක සේ සළකා

දින දින ජය බිම වෙතම යොමා අප

සැරදේ විදුහල් මාතා

- Lyricist : Mr. M. R. B. Tennakoon
- Melody : Mr. Somapala Senarath

== Facilities ==
Facilities include auditorium, playground, swimming pool, basketball court, volleyball court, netball courts, children's parks, computer labs, dental center, shrine room, bodhiya, gymnasium, audio video rooms, libraries, botanical, zoological, physical and chemical labs, hostel, canteens, co-operative shops, milk bar, transport services

== Units, Societies & Clubs ==
- Devians Media Unit
- Interact Club
- Photographic Art Society
- Mother Sri Lanka Society
- Astronomical Society
- Science Society
- Arts Society
- Commerce Society
- Maths Society
- Girl Guiding Association
- Philatelic Club
- Devians Quiz Club
- Debate Society
- Red Cross Society
- UNESCO
- Parisara Niyamu
- Saukyadana

== Old Girls’ Association ==
Old Girls’ Association was founded in 1959 with pioneering by Mrs. G.I. Abeysekara. The first official meeting of the Old Girls’ Association was conducted on 4 October 1961 with the presence of 20 old girls and 10 teachers. The main objective was the development of the Alma Mater. The first secretary was Mrs. P. Wijesekara. The current president is Mrs. Chinthamani Moonamale Balalla.
