= Royal College Wayamba, Kurunegala =

Royal College, Wayamba
- රාජකීය විද්‍යාලය, වයඹ කුරුණෑගල
- Kurunegala, North Western Province; Sri Lanka

Information
- Type: National school
- Motto: Labor omnia vincit
- Established: 1993
- Founder: Manel Wickramasinghe (1993 - 2003)
- Grades: 1-13
- Gender: Mix
- Colours: Green and yellow
- Website: www.wayambaroyal.lk

Royal College Wayamba (Sinhala: රාජකීය විද්‍යාලය, වයඹ කුරුණෑගල also known as Wayamba Royal College, Royal College Wayamba, Kurunegala or Royal College, Kurunegala) is a national school in Kurunegala, established in February 1993 in Sri Lanka. Current students of the school are known as Wayamba Royalists.

== College Facilities ==
Royal College Wayamba, Kurunegala has a number of facilities, including computer laboratories, lecture halls, science laboratories, playground and auditorium.

== Sports ==
=== Cricket ===
The annual cricket Big Match, known as the Battle of the Greens, is played between Royal College Wayamba and Sir John Kotalawala College.

== See also ==
- List of schools in North Western Province, Sri Lanka
- Big Match
