= Maliyadeva College =

- මලියදේව විද්‍යාලය

Location
- Negombo Rd, Kurunegala; Kurunegala; Sri Lanka; 7°29′14″N 80°21′34″E

Information
- Type: National
- Motto: Sanskrit: विद्या भूषणं पुरुष भूषणम् විද්‍යා භූෂනං පුරුෂ භූෂනම් (විද්‍යාව මිනිසාගේ ආභරණයයි); Vidya Bhūshanam Purusha Bhūshanam (Science is the jewel of man)
- Established: 30 September 1888; 138 years ago
- Founder: Henry Steel Olcott
- Principal: W. M. C. K. Mahamithawa
- Grades: 1–13
- Gender: Boys
- Age range: 6 to 19
- Enrollment: 4169
- Colors: Navy blue, golden yellow and maroon
- Affiliation: Buddhist
- Alumni: Old Devans
- Website: maliyadeva.lk

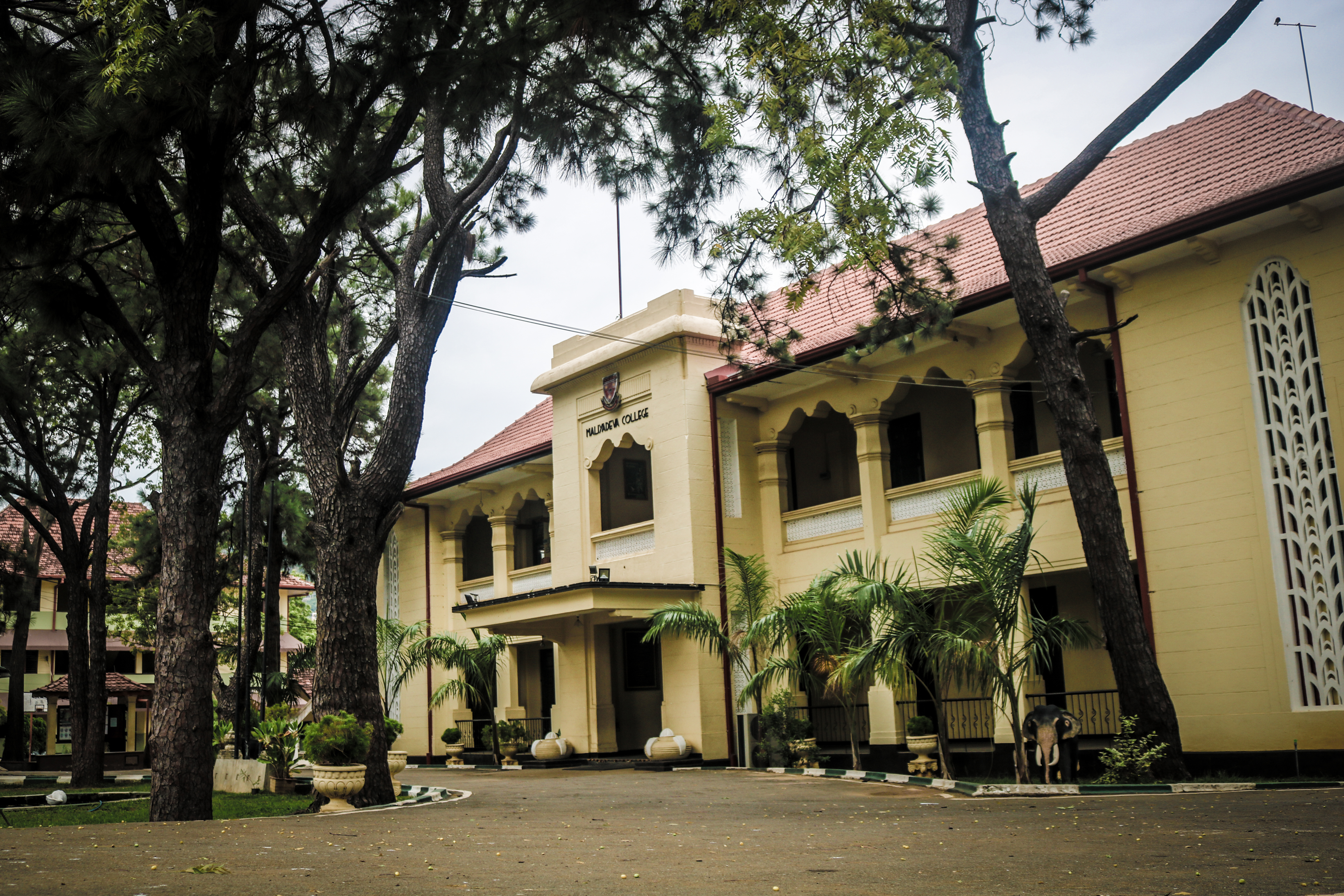
Maliyadeva Main Hall.

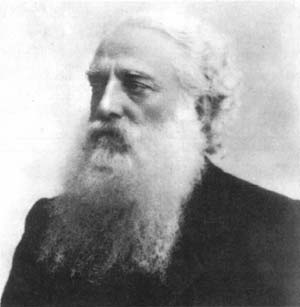
Colonel H.S. Olcott, founder of Maliyadeva College

Maliyadeva College (Sinhala: මලියදේව විද්‍යාලය) is a national school controlled by the Sri Lankan central government. It is located in Kurunegala, Sri Lanka, and was established in 1888 by the Buddhist Theosophical Society, led by Colonel Henry Steel Olcott. It is one of Sri Lanka's oldest schools. Today, the school accommodates 4,000 students. The current and former students of Maliyadeva College are known as "Devans".

== College name ==
The school is referred to as Maliyadeva College or simply as Maliyadeva. Local newspapers also refer to it as the Maliyadeva Boys' College. The school was named Maliyadeva College after Arhat Maliyadeva, the last Maha Arhat thero in Buddhist history who had great psychic powers (Abhijnanalabhi: in Sinhala: අභිඥ්ඥාලාභී). Although there are several schools, especially in this part of the island, that have adopted the name Maliyadeva, none have links to Maliyadeva College other than the Maliyadeva Balika Vidyalaya, which was separated in 1946 from the previously mixed Maliyadeva College as an institution for girls.

== History ==
In June 1888, a new school with one student was opened at a place in Bodhiraja Mawatha near the present Central Bus Stand in Kurunegala, by Seminaries A. Bamunu-Arachchige. He was a young Maha-Vidane (Vidane Arachchi) who had been put in charge of four villages by Maha-Mudaliyar Bandaranaike and Colonel Henry Steel Olcott. He was assisted by local donors, Hulugalle, Adikaram and Mudaliyar Attygala. The school was named Kurunegala Buddhist Institution.

By 1908, the number of students had risen to one hundred, still under the leadership of Maha-Vidane Semenaries. In 1909, the school moved to new premises at a Buddhist Temple, Ethkanda Viharaya, along the Kandy—Kurunegala main road. The decision was made by Mudaliyar Bandaranaike and Maha Vidane Seminaries.

In 1922, the school's management was changed from the Buddhist Theosophical Society to the YMBA (Young Men's Buddhist Association). H. K. T. de Zylva became the new manager.

The school was governed by B. A Semenaries who, being a Maha-Vidane, had the power to change anything if given permission by the Mudaliyar of the province. In late 1927, Maha-Vidane Semenaries changed the school's name to Maliyadeva College. B.A. Semenaries retired from governing the school in 1931 and, after forty-three years as Maha-Vidane, he gave the position to Bandaranaike's son, the future prime minister of Ceylon. Before leaving, Maha-Vidane Semeneries appointed U. B. Wanninayake (who later became a politician and government minister) as the principal in 1930 and abolished the manager system. Sir Henry Olcott died in 1907. Maha-Vidane Semenaries died in June 1945.

In 1934, a batch of students from Maliyadeva College appeared for the SSC Examination (equivalent to current GCE) for the first time.

By 1936, the premises at Ethkanda Viharaya were not big enough. Former governor Maha-Vidane Semenaries and Mudaliyar Bandaranaike, who was on his last term, gave the order for the school to be moved to its current location along the Negombo - Kurunegala road. The land was owned by Madawala Disawa and was bought by H. K. T. de Zylva.

P. de S. Kularatne was appointed as the manager in 1941. He changed the status of the school into a mixed school.

Due to the Second World War, the school buildings and land were taken over by the Army in 1942. The school had to be shifted back to its previous location at Ethkanda Viharaya. By then, the number of students had increased to over three hundred and sixty.

The primary section of the school was moved to a new location along the Colombo – Kurunegala road in 1944. This later became the Maliyadeva Girls' College.

In 1946, the school was handed back to the YMBA by the army. Only the boys were moved back, and the Maliyadeva Girls' College began functioning as a separate school. In the same year, Maliyadeva College became a government-assisted school. The number of students had increased to 800.

In 1949, the school was upgraded to the status of a Grade 1 school. University Entrance (Arts) and SSC (equivalent to current GCE) Science classes began and D. B. Dissanayaka was appointed as the vice-principal during this year.

In 1951, students appeared for the University Entrance (Arts) and SSC (Science) Examinations for the first time. T. B. H. Abeysinghe was the first student to enter the University from Maliyadeva College. Later, Abeysinghe rose to the position of professor of history.

University Entrance (science) classes were commenced in 1953. Wanigasekara was the first graduate science teacher appointed to the school. In 1955, A. P. K. Thilakarathna was the first student who passed the SSC (Science) Examinations for the first time.

According to the Education Policy of the incumbent government, the status of the school changed from a government-assisted school to a government school in 1961 during the takeover of all assisted schools. The YMBA handed the school over to the Ministry of Education.

Maliyadeva had won the all-island awards in oriental music and orchestra competitions for many years consecutively. 1979 saw the end of an era when D. B. Dissanayake retired after serving the school for fourteen years as the principal. By 1985, the number of students had risen to 3000. The school was upgraded to the status of a National School by the Ministry of Education under the reorganization of schools.

== Religious background ==
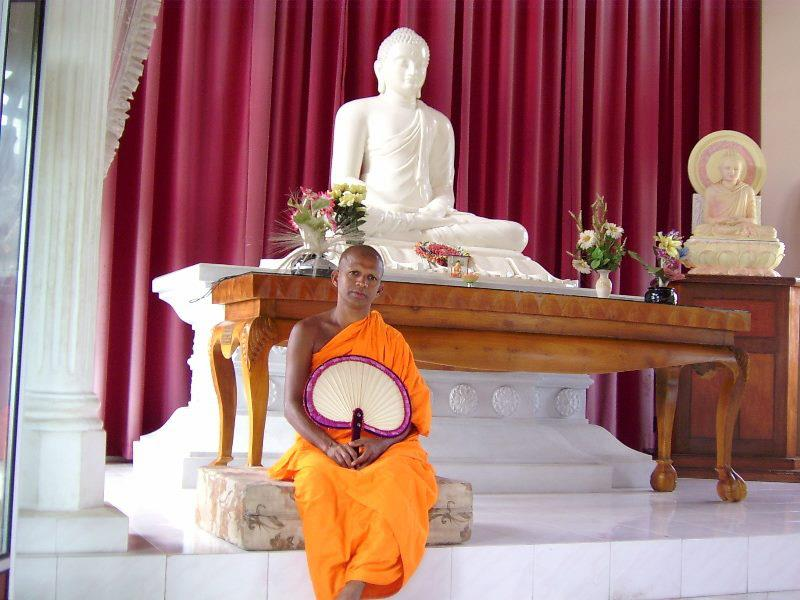
College shrine

Maliyadeva College is unique in having a Buddhist temple in the school itself. The discipline and ethics of the students are largely directed by the college temple.

The School Buddhist Association was established in 1961. Before that, an association called the Buddhist Kathakodhaya Association was commenced with the leadership of Ibbagala Rajamaha Viharadhipathi Nakaththe Anandha Thera and U. B. Wanninayake. After that, the school became the headquarters of Buddhists in this area. Therefore, the Regional Buddhist Association was commenced with the leadership of the Maliyadeva College Buddhist Association. The first shrine was built in 1939.

Today, the Buddhist Association is the base of ethics and religious activities in school. All students are members of the association. It organizes religious activities throughout the year, such as the annual Katina Pinkama, annual Parithrana Dharmadeshanawa, annual Sangagatha Dakshinawa, Pirith Pinkam, and Buddhist Pageants.

== Facilities ==
Facilities include playgrounds, an auditorium, a swimming pool, a basketball court, an Indoor stadium, children's parks, computer labs, medical and dental centres, a two-storied shrine for Buddhist monks, a gymnasium, a library, a botanical, zoological, physical and chemical labs, hostel, canteens, co-operative shops, milk bar and transport services.

== Crest ==
The college crest is one of the identities of Maliyadeva College. It is designed with meaningful symbols. Every student wears a uniform with the badge stitched on their pocket, while the prefects wear an additional metal badge resembling the school crest on the centre of their chest.

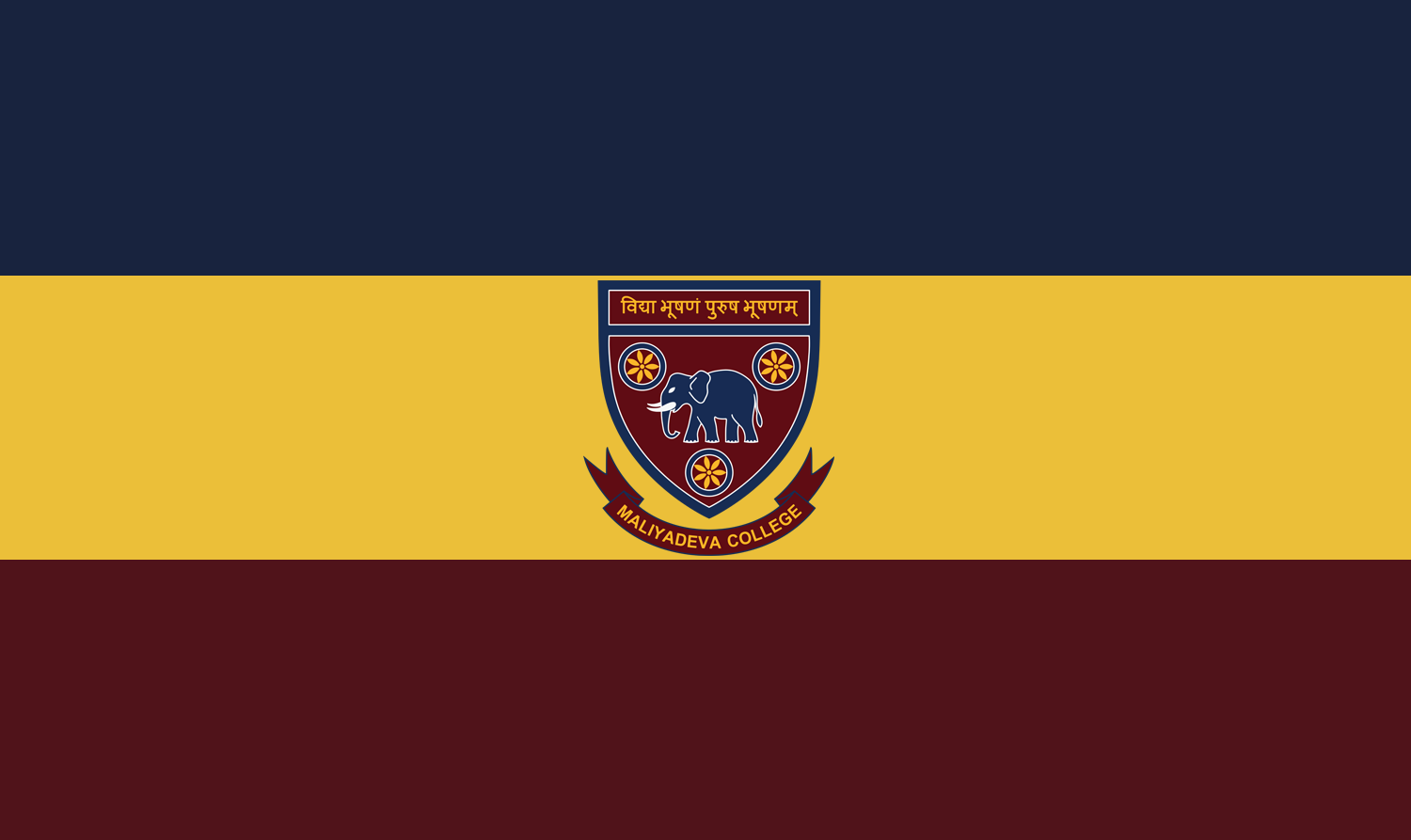
Maliyadeva College Flag

- The shield shape of the college crest emphasizes the power and courage of the school.
- On a symmetrically twined ribbon of maroon colour, the name of the college is carved.
- The tusker in the middle represents Athugalpura, an old name for Kurunegala, the city where the college is located.
- The three lotus flowers symbolize the Triple Gem.
- The seven petals in each flower stand for Sath Koralaya, which is what the area was called during the monarchical era.
- On top of the shield, Vidya Bhushanam Purusha Bhushanam is engraved in Sanskrit. This is the motto of Maliyadeva College, which means Knowledge is the Jewel of the Man.

== Houses ==
The students are divided into four houses according to their admission numbers. The house names are derived from the past kings of Sri Lanka.

- – Thissa

In honour of King Devanampiya Thissa.

- – Gamunu

In honour of King Dutugamunu.

- – Parakrama

In honour of King Parakramabahu.

- – Rajasinha

In honour of King Rajasinha.

The four houses compete in the annual inter-house sports meeting which is usually held in the first term of the academic year.

== Sports ==
=== Cricket ===
The Battle of the Rocks is an annual cricket contest held between Maliyadeva College and St. Anne's College. The match is traditionally held at the Welagedara Stadium in Kurunegala and played over two days, with the winning team awarded a trophy. A one-day limited-overs match was introduced in 1992.

2024 marked the 40th edition of the two-day encounter, and the 27th edition of the limited-overs match.

https://maliyadevaobwelfare.com/wp-content/uploads/2025/10/alumni-association-executive-committee-1.jpeg==Old Boys' Association==

On 13 July 1936, Nakette Ananda Thero gathered several old boys of the school to initiate an Old Boys Association. Under the chairmanship of the principal, U. B. Wanninayake, a decision was made to build a Sanghawasaya (A place for the monks to live) for the school. Ananda Thero was appointed as the patron, and Wanninayake as the association's president. Other officials elected were H. W. Gunasekara as secretary and E. S. Balasuriya as treasurer. Since that date, a president is elected by members at each annual general meeting.

== Past principals ==
Name	Entered office	Departed office
T. B. Madawala	1888	-
W. G. de Silva	1905	-
A. B. Arur	1923	1927
U. B. Wanninayaka	1930	1949
E. A. Perusinghe	1949	1961
D. B. Dissanayake	1961	1966
W. A. Jayathilake	1966	1967
M. B. Pethiyagoda	1967	1970
D. B. Dissanayake	1970	1979
G. M. K. Pathiraja	1979	1982
H. B. Wijekoone	1982	1987
B. G. Chandrasekara	1987	1989
A. M. B. Abeyrathne	1989	1992
A. V. Ranasinghe	1992	1994
S. M. J. B. Senevirathne	1995	2001
R. M. M. Rathnayake	2002	2010
R. M. C. P. K. Rathnayake	2011	2012
Y. G. Thilakarathne	2012	2017
W. M. Saman Indrarathne	2018	2020
W. Ranjith Jayasundara	2020	2023
W.M.C.K.Mahamithawa	2023	Present

== Notable alumni ==
Former students of Maliyadeva College are known as Old Devans.

== See also ==
- Education in Sri Lanka
