= Kurunegala =

City in Sri Lanka

Kurunegala කුරුණෑගල குருணாகல்
- City
- Kurunegala
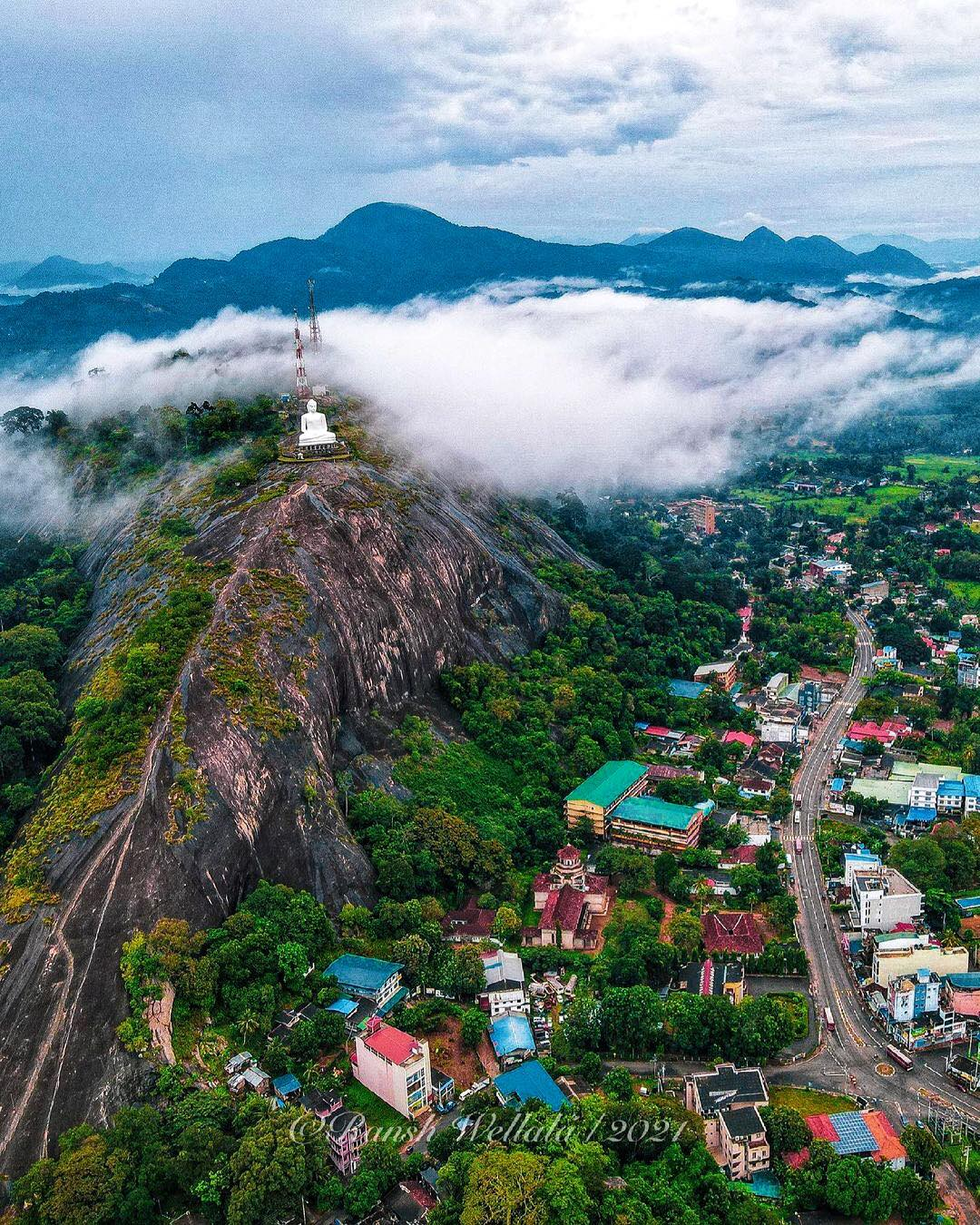
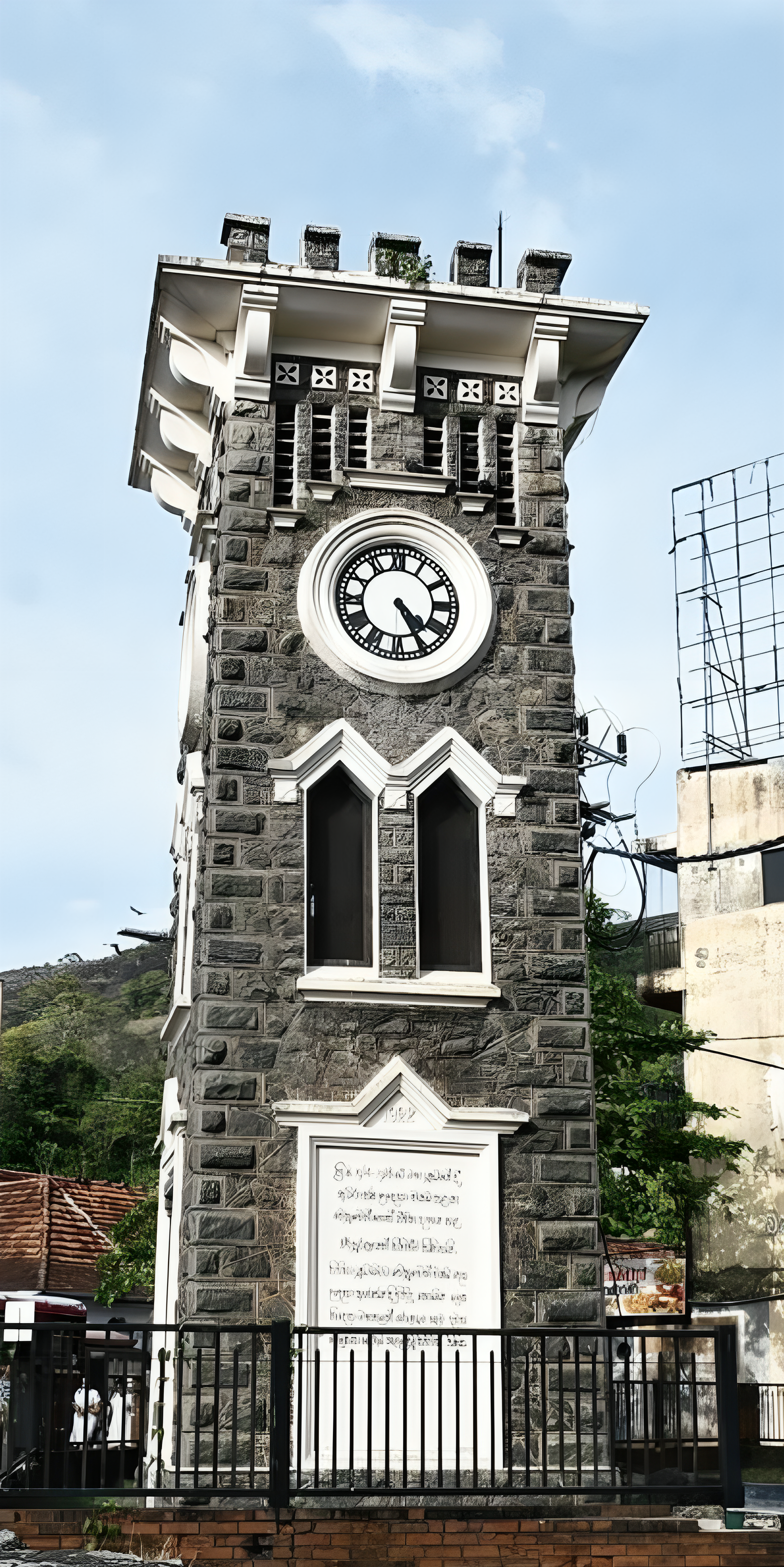
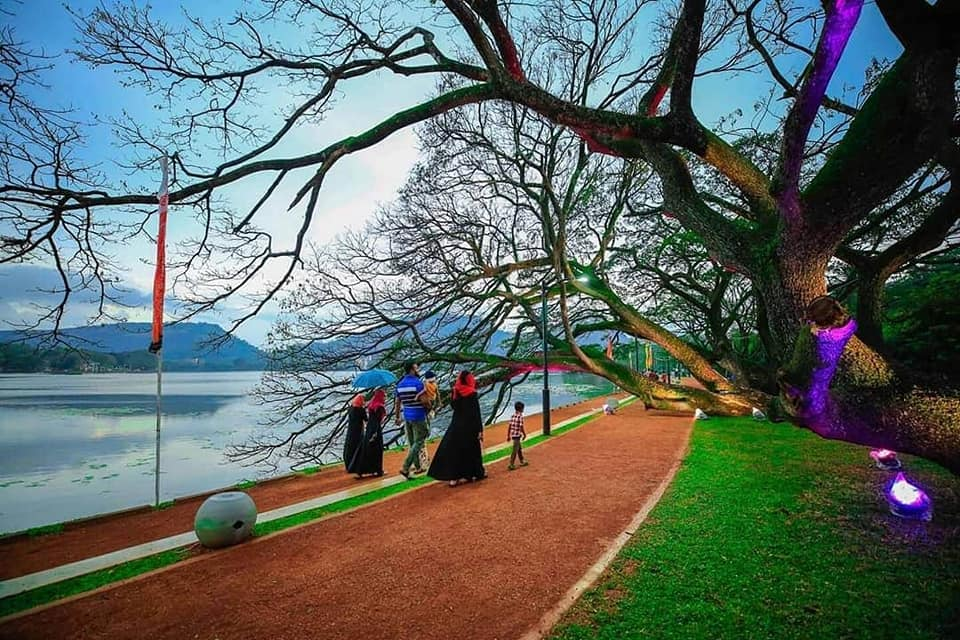
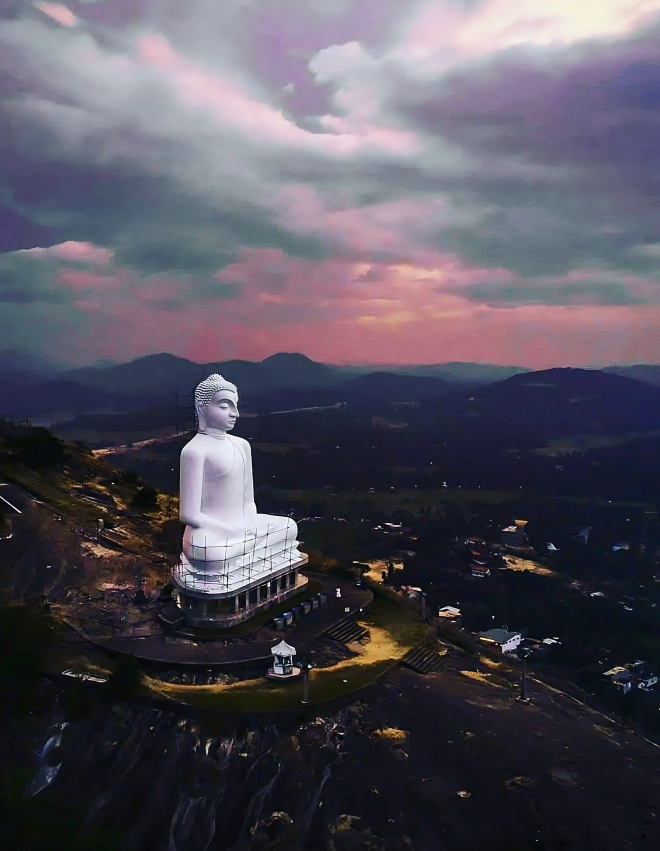
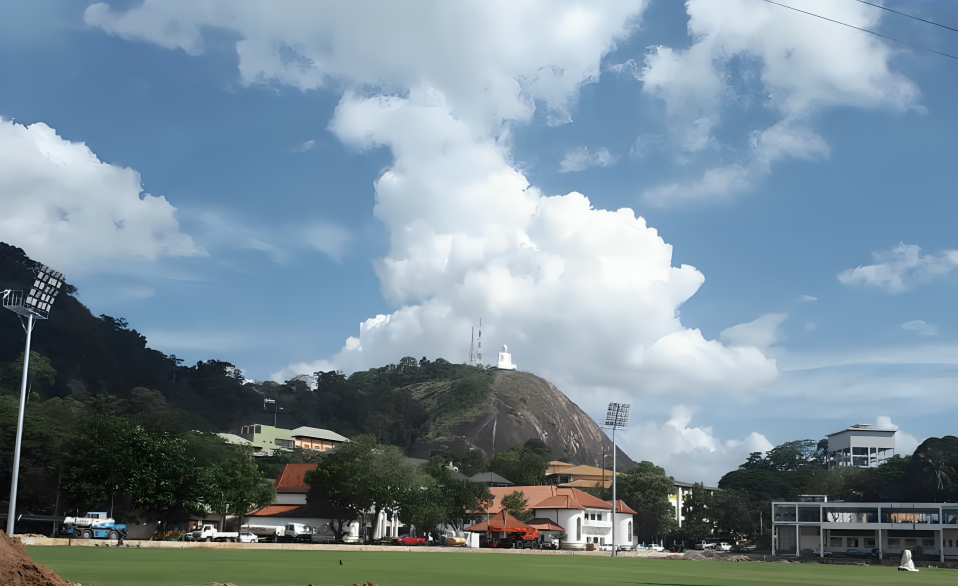
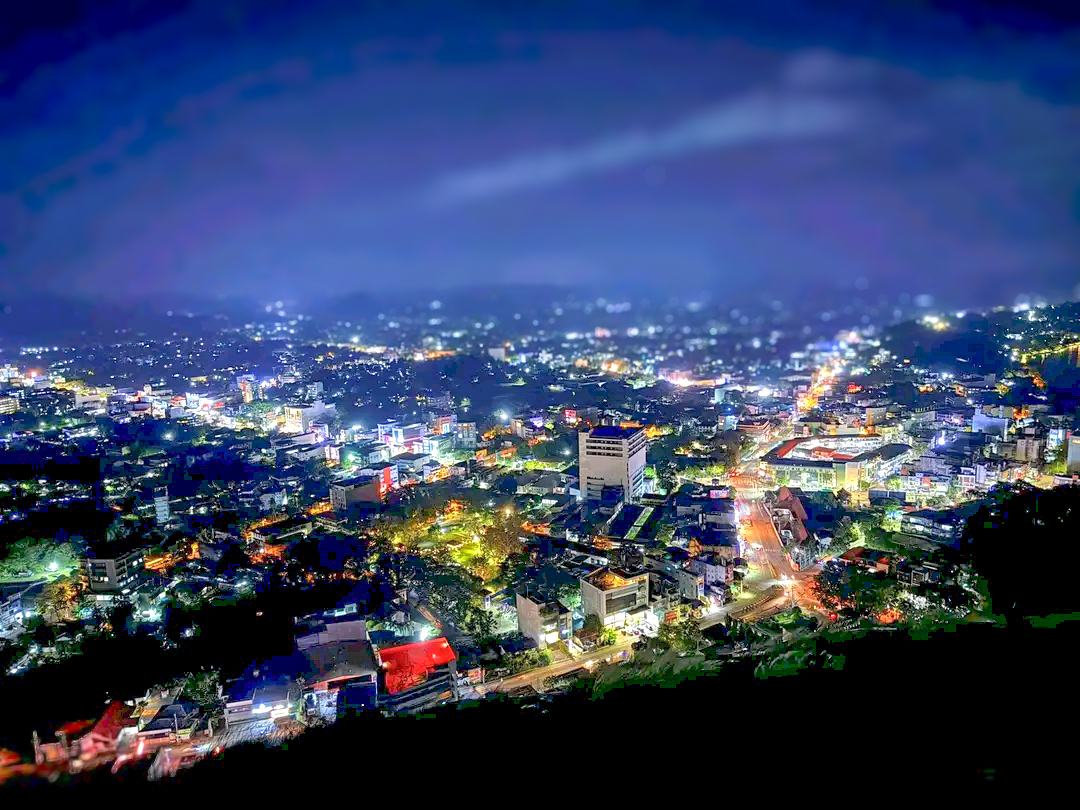
- Birdseye view of Elephant’s Rock and the city Kurunegala Clock Tower A serene lake near Kurunegala Elephant Rock Maliga Grounds Kurunegala Kurunegala City Night View

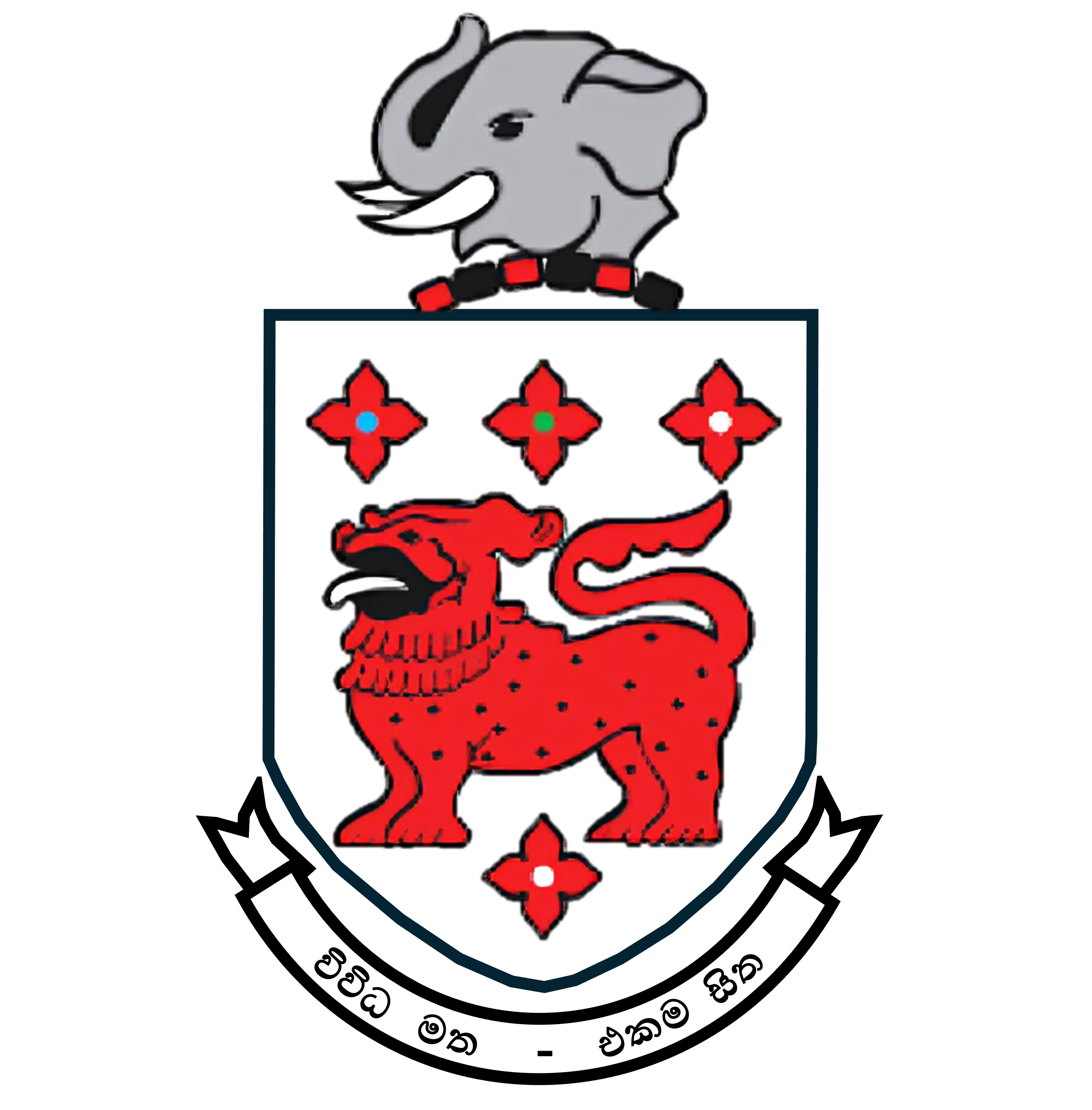
- Seal
- Nicknames: Ethugalpura (Sinhala: ඇතුගල්පුර, romanized: Ætugalpura, meaning: City of the Elephant Rock); Hasthi Shailapura (Sinhala: හස්ති ශෛලපුර, romanized: Hasti Śailapura, meaning: City of the Elephant Rock)
- Location within Sri Lanka
- Coordinates: 7°29′N 80°22′E
- Country: Sri Lanka
- Province: North Western Province, Sri Lanka

Government
  - Type: Municipal Council
  - Mayor: Sumedha Arunashantha

Area
  - Total: 11 km^{2} (4.2 sq mi)
- Elevation: 116 m (381 ft)

Population (2011)
  - Total: 30,315
  - Density: 2,817/km^{2} (7,300/sq mi)
- Demonym: Kurunegalians
- Time zone: UTC+5:30 (Sri Lanka Standard Time Zone)
- Postal code: 60000
- Area code: 037
- Vehicle registration: NW-XXX-0000
- Website: http://www.kurunegala.mc.gov.lk

Kurunegala (Sinhala: කුරුණෑගල, IPA: [kurunæːɡələ]; Tamil: குருணாகல், IPA: [kuɾuɳaːɣɐl]) is a major city in Sri Lanka. It is the capital city of the North Western Province and the Kurunegala District. Kurunegala was an ancient royal capital for 50 years, from the end of the 13th century to the start of the 14th century. It is at the junction of several main roads linking to other important parts of the country. It is about 94 kilometres (58 mi) from Colombo, 42 kilometres (26 mi) from Kandy and 51 kilometres (32 mi) from Matale.

Located at an altitude of 116 metres (381 ft) above sea level, Kurunegala is surrounded by coconut plantations and rubber estates. There are eight very noticeable large rocks that encircle and dominate the city. Kurunegala's rocks rise from the plain below and have characteristic names, six of which come from the animals that they are imagined to represent. The largest among them is Ethagala or the "Elephant Rock" (though the translation is actually tusker), reaches 325 metres (1,066 ft). The shape of Ethagala resembles an elephant.

== Etymology ==
Kurunegala has been named after the Elephant rock (ඇතුගල). "Kurune" means tusker or an elephant with protruding teeth and gala in Sinhala means rock. Kurunai means tusker or an Elephant and gal in Tamil means rock or hill. Kurunegala's old name was Hasthishaila-pura, which can be translated as 'The City of the Elephant Rock' in Sanskrit. In some ancient literature, the word Athugal-pura (ඇතුගල්පුර) is employed to describe the city of Kurunegala.

Nearby are three archeological cities — Parakramapura (Panduvasnuwara, පඬුවස්නුවර) (northwest) with remains of a moated palace and monasteries from the 12th century, Dambadeniya (දඹ‍‍‍‍දෙනිය) (southwest, mid-13th century) and Yapahuwa (north).

Kurunegala enjoys a pleasant location with huge rocky outcrops some of which have been given names of the animals they resemble: elephant rock, tortoise rock etc. According to folklore legend, a long time back the city had a severe drought. To exacerbate matters for humans, animals had threatened the city's storage capabilities by consuming huge amounts of water. A witch volunteered to alleviate the problem, transforming some of the animals magically into stone figures.

== History ==
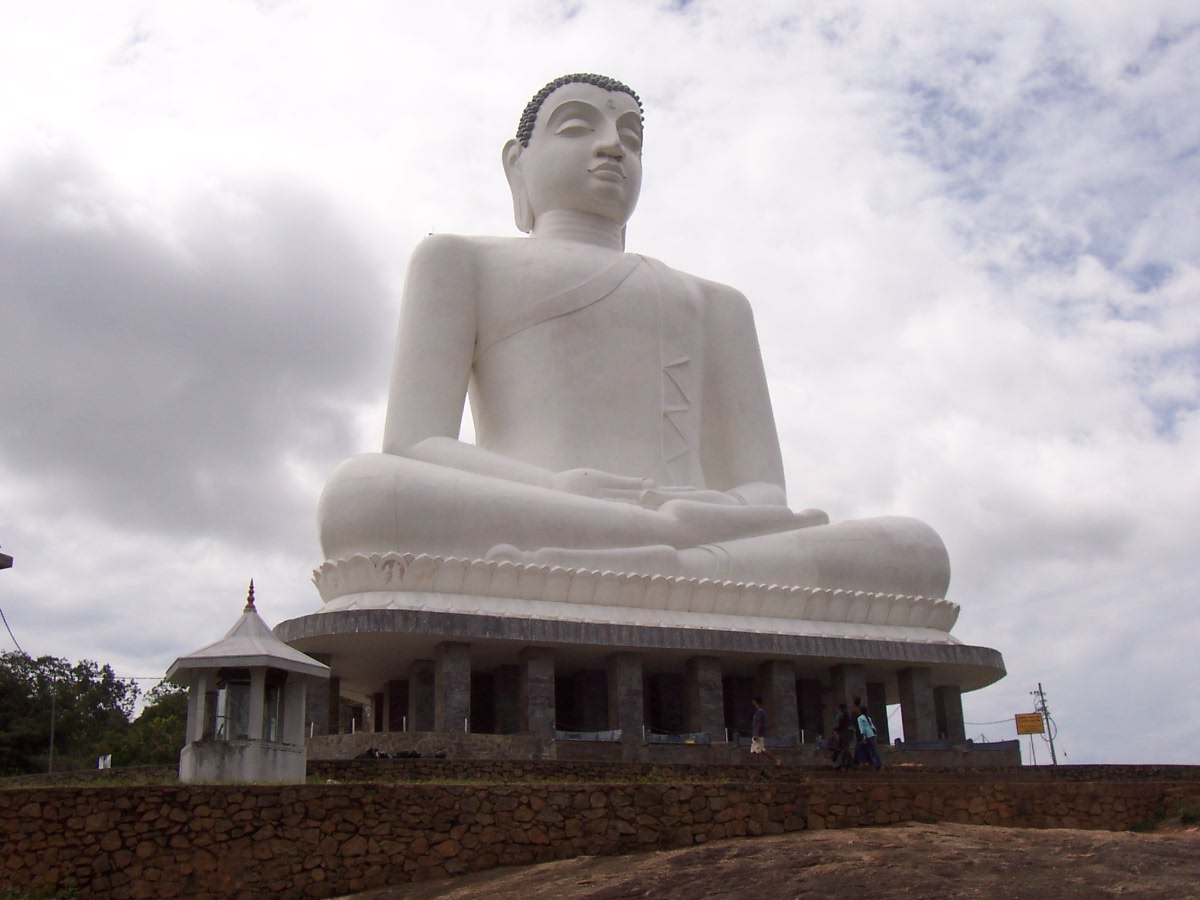
A statue of the Buddha on Athugala (Elephant Rock), measuring 88 feet (27 m)

Kurunegala had a citadel in the 13th century. Its ascendancy as an ancient capital of Sri Lanka began with a series of events that took place during the late 12th century at Yapahuwa. The sacred tooth relic which was in the Yapahuwa Kingdom was taken by an Aryacakravarti from the Jaffna Kingdom to the Pandyan country during the rule of Buwaneka Bahu I from 1272 to 1284. The relic was brought back by King Parakrama Bahu III who ruled from Kurunegala between 1287 and 1293. Over the next half a century Kurunegala was the capital and the governing centre for three other kings of Sri Lanka.

After the death of King Parakrama Bahu III, King Buwanekabahu II (1293–1302), followed by Parakramabahu IV (1302–1326), ruled from Kurunegala. The ruler in Kurunegala from 1326 to 1335 was Buwanekabahu III, also known as Wanni Buwanekabahu. He was the son of Pandit Parakramabahu II and is believed to be the last king to rule the country from Kurunegala.

After the reign of Buwaneka Bahu III, the newly throned king Vijayabahu V ruled from Dambadeniya and Yapahuwa from 1335 to 1341 before once again the kingdom of Sri Lanka shifted to Gampola.

Few remains of the Palace of the Tooth relic that housed the tooth of the Buddha have avoided natural destruction, including few stone steps and a part of a doorway.

=== Sites with archaeological significance ===
==== Royal complex ====
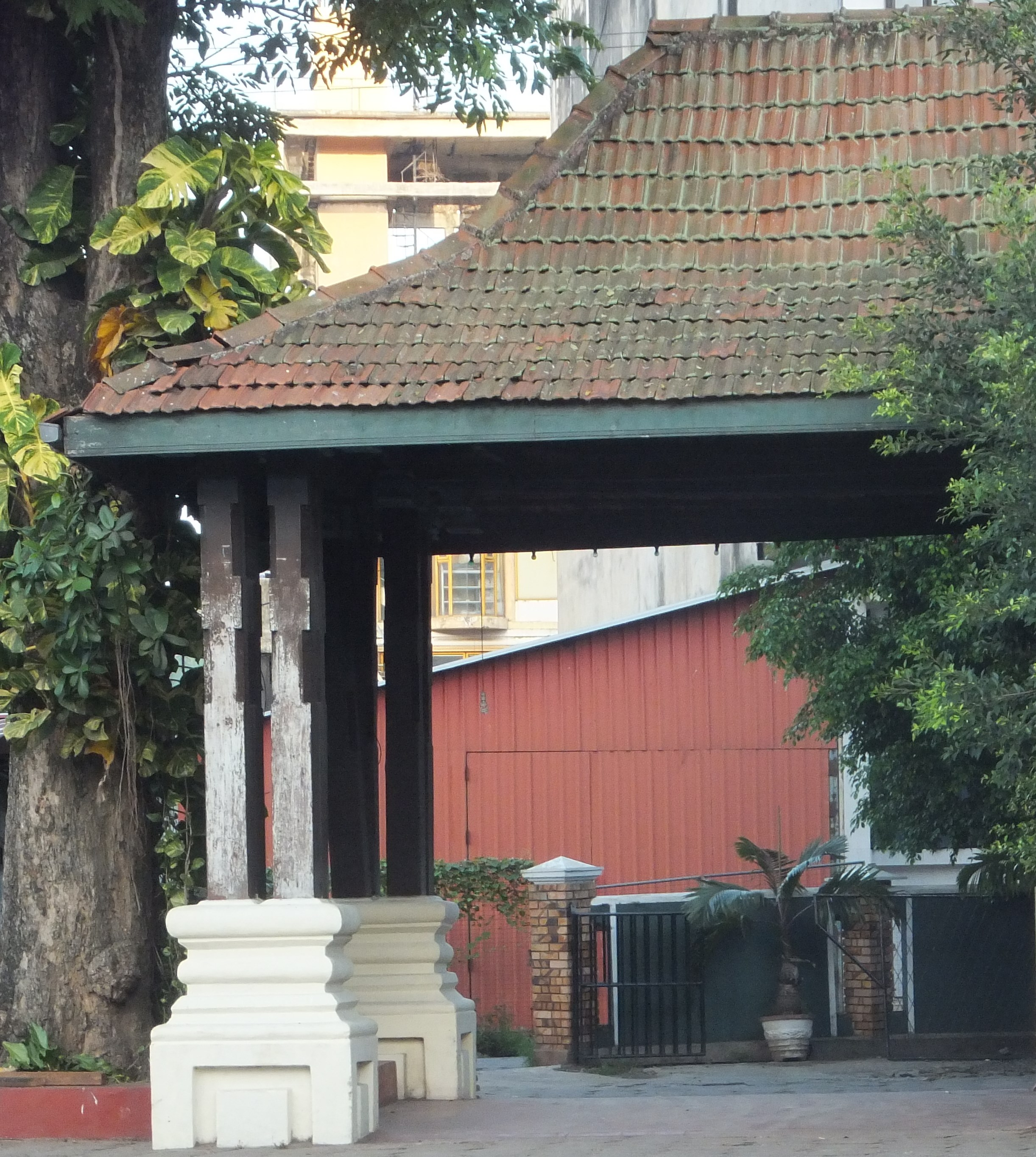
Ancient Magul Maduwa building of Kurunegala era

Few archaeological remains of this site survive. They include the stone entrance, steps, rock pillars and ruined walls of the royal palace and the palace of the tooth relic.

==== Kurunegala lake ====
A large man-made water reservoir constructed by ancient kings. The lake is in the outskirts of the central business district accessible by the Kurunegala-Dambulla and Kurunegala-Puttlam roads. The tank is used as a water supply source and serves as a major attraction offering a scenic view of the city and the famous elephant rock.

==== Kurunegala clock tower ====
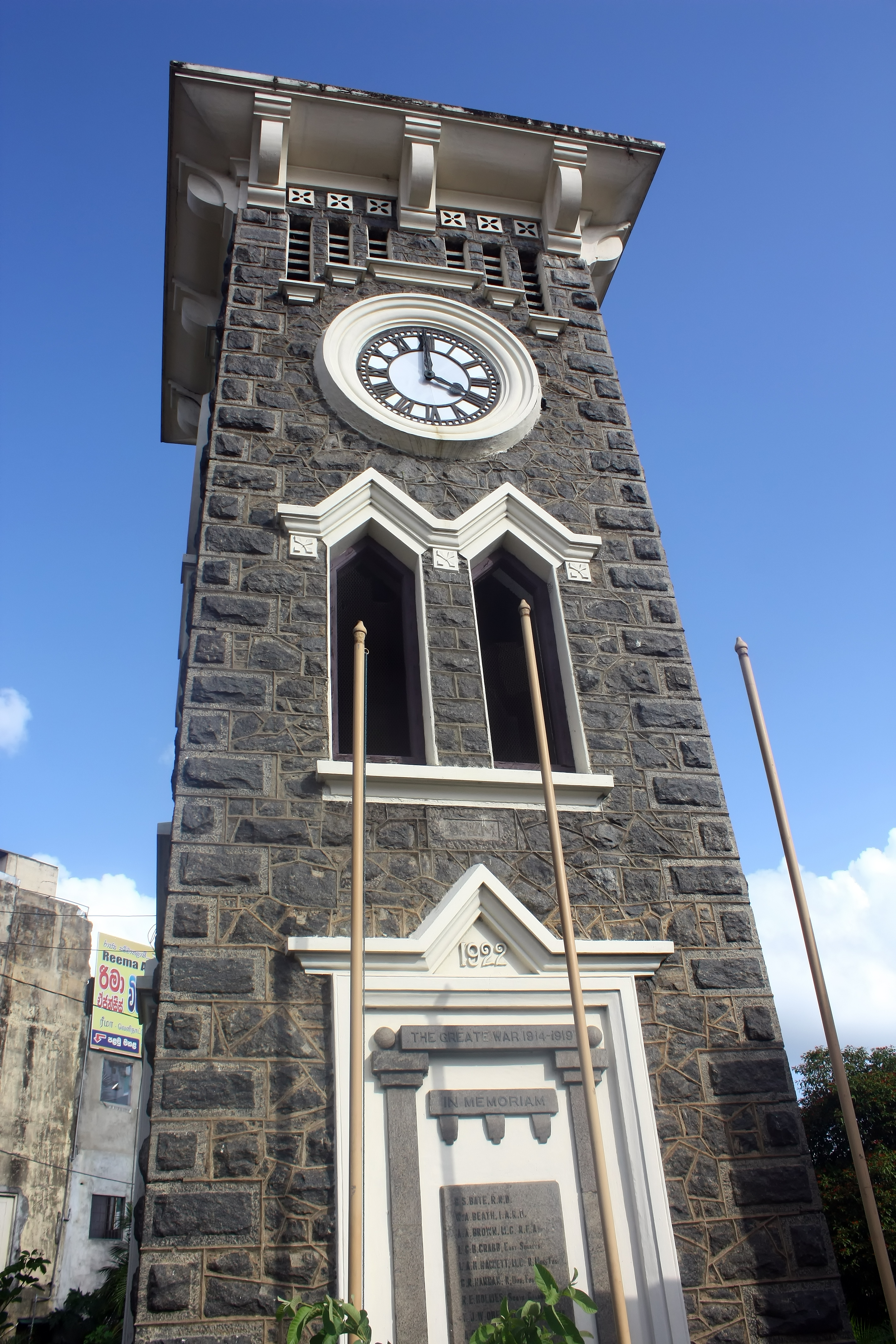
Clock Tower, Kurunegala

The Kurunegala clock tower was built in 1922 as a tribute to the officers, who were from Wayamba province and sacrificed their lives in World War I.

== Geography and climate ==
=== Geography ===
Topographically Kurunegala town is based on a plain area with the exception of the surrounding rock outcrops. The northern part of the town is slightly higher than the south. Kurunegala Lake is the primary geographical feature of Kurunegala and adorns the town. The region comprising the Kurunegala town is well above the sea level compared to the coastal areas of Sri Lanka. However, the region is not as high as the central hill country. The nearest beaches to Kurunegala are to the west and include Negombo and Chilaw.

==== Surrounding rock outcrops ====
Kurunegala is surrounded by several major rock outcrops, a distinctive geological feature of the Wayamba province.

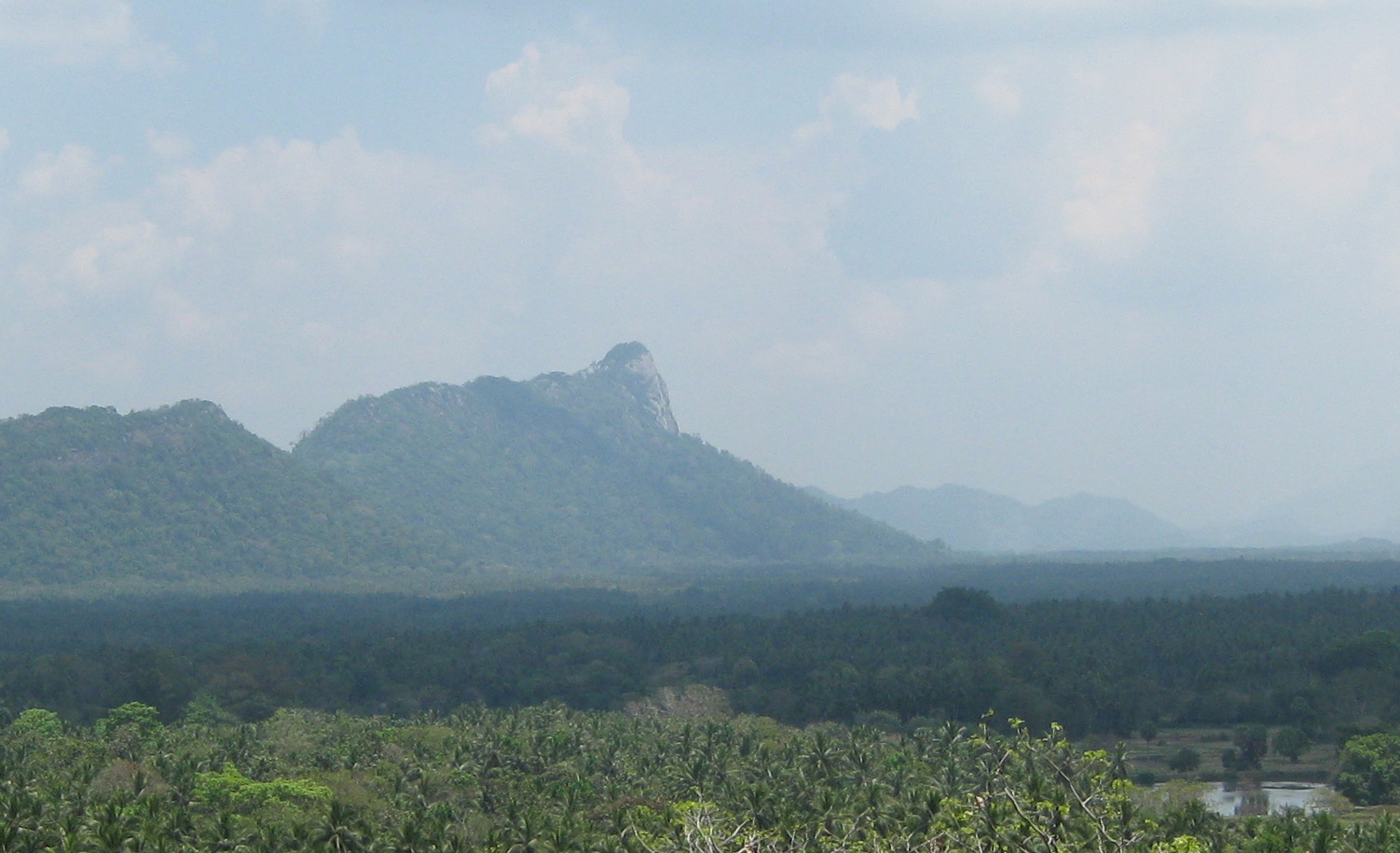
Yakdessagala (Witch Rock)

- Ethagala (Elephant Rock)
- Ibbagala (Tortoise Rock)
- Andagala (Eel Rock)
- Elugala (Goat Rock)
- Kuruminiyagala (Beetle Rock)
- Wanduragala (Monkey Rock)
- Yakdessagala (Witch Rock)
- Gonigala (Sack Rock)
- Adhagala

=== Climate ===
Kurunegala features a tropical rainforest climate under the Köppen climate classification. The city's climate is tropical and hot all throughout the year. The surrounding rocks play a major role in determining Kurunegala's weather since these rocks increase and retain the heat of the day. During the month of April the temperature can rise up to about 35 °C (95 °F). The only major change in the Kurunegala weather occurs during the monsoons from May to August and October to January when heavy rains can be expected. While the city does experience noticeably drier weather during January and February, it does not qualify as a true dry season as average precipitation in both months are above 60 millimetres (2 in). In general, temperatures from late November to mid February period are lower than the rest of the year.

The average annual rainfall in Kurunegala is about 2,000 millimetres (79 in).

Climate data for Kurunegala, Sri Lanka (1961–1990)
Month	Jan	Feb	Mar	Apr	May	Jun	Jul	Aug	Sep	Oct	Nov	Dec	Year
Record high °C (°F)	35.6 (96.1)	37.6 (99.7)	39.2 (102.6)	39.0 (102.2)	37.7 (99.9)	35.5 (95.9)	35.3 (95.5)	35.7 (96.3)	37.2 (99.0)	36.7 (98.1)	34.0 (93.2)	39.0 (102.2)	39.2 (102.6)
Mean daily maximum °C (°F)	30.8 (87.4)	33.1 (91.6)	34.5 (94.1)	33.5 (92.3)	32.2 (90.0)	31.0 (87.8)	30.8 (87.4)	31.1 (88.0)	31.5 (88.7)	31.3 (88.3)	30.9 (87.6)	30.1 (86.2)	31.7 (89.1)
Daily mean °C (°F)	25.7 (78.3)	27.0 (80.6)	28.4 (83.1)	28.6 (83.5)	28.3 (82.9)	27.6 (81.7)	27.3 (81.1)	27.4 (81.3)	27.5 (81.5)	27.0 (80.6)	26.5 (79.7)	25.9 (78.6)	27.3 (81.1)
Mean daily minimum °C (°F)	20.7 (69.3)	20.9 (69.6)	22.4 (72.3)	23.6 (74.5)	24.4 (75.9)	24.2 (75.6)	23.9 (75.0)	23.8 (74.8)	23.5 (74.3)	22.8 (73.0)	22.1 (71.8)	21.7 (71.1)	22.8 (73.0)
Record low °C (°F)	14.6 (58.3)	14.7 (58.5)	16.2 (61.2)	20.4 (68.7)	20.3 (68.5)	20.8 (69.4)	20.2 (68.4)	19.4 (66.9)	19.2 (66.6)	18.3 (64.9)	15.7 (60.3)	14.8 (58.6)	14.6 (58.3)
Average precipitation mm (inches)	62 (2.4)	92 (3.6)	138 (5.4)	262 (10.3)	194 (7.6)	156 (6.1)	114 (4.5)	93 (3.7)	159 (6.3)	359 (14.1)	327 (12.9)	139 (5.5)	2,095 (82.5)
Average relative humidity (%) (at Daytime)	65	59	60	69	73	74	73	71	71	74	74	72	69.6
Source: NOAA

== Demographics ==
Kurunegala is a Sinhalese majority city; there are sizable communities belonging to other ethnic groups, such as Moors, Tamils, Burghers and Malays. Residents from ethnic minorities live in all parts of the city, however, sizeable communities of Moors and Tamils live in the areas of Teliyagonna and Wilgoda.

=== Ethnicity according to Kurunegala DS area (2012) ===
Ethnicity in Kurunegala DS Area (2012)
Population	Percent
Sinhalese	84.19%
Muslims	10.76%
Sri Lankan Tamils	3.67%
Others	1.38%

Source: 2015 Census Data

=== Language ===
The common languages of Kurunegala, depending on social classes, social circles, and ethnic backgrounds are Sinhalese, Tamil and English.

=== Religion ===
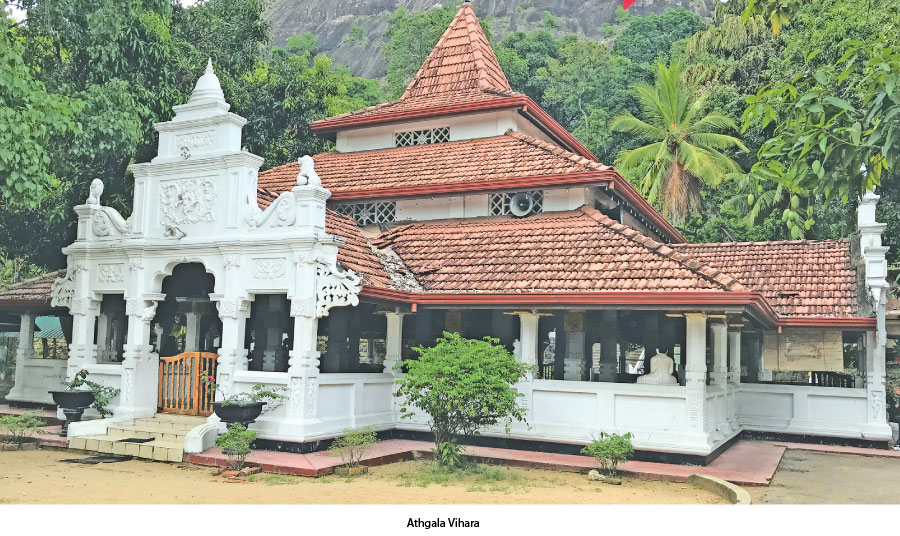
Athkanda Royal temple Kurunegala.

Buddhism is the main and the most widely practiced religion in Kurunegala. The town is also home to a wide range of other religious faiths and sects including Hinduism, Christianity and Islam.

Prominent Buddhist temples in Kurunegala include Athkanda Raja Maha Viharaya. It is said that the fabled Jathaka stories were composed at this historic temple. The temple is located on the left hand side of the Kandy-Kurunegala main road in the vicinity of the Kurunegala town, Ibbagala Raja Maha Viharaya, Angangala cave temple, Wilbawa Purana Viharaya and Bauddhaloka Viharaya. An ancient replica of Buddha's footprint that is found on the summit of Sri Pada (Adam's Peak), a little dagoba and some paintings depicting the Buddha and his disciples can be seen at the Ibbagala Raja Maha Viharaya.

Kurunegala is home to various Roman Catholic and other Christian denominations. Notably, the Roman Catholic Diocese of Kurunegala is centered at St. Anne's Cathedral, located within the town. Furthermore, the Anglican Diocese of Kurunegala, the 2nd diocese of Church of Ceylon also has Cathedral Church of Christ the King, situated in the city. The Anglican Bishop of Kurunegala cares for the North-Central Province and Kurunegala, Kandy, Matale, Kegalle and Anuradapura districts.

There are also numbers of mosques and Hindu temples in the city.

== Administration ==
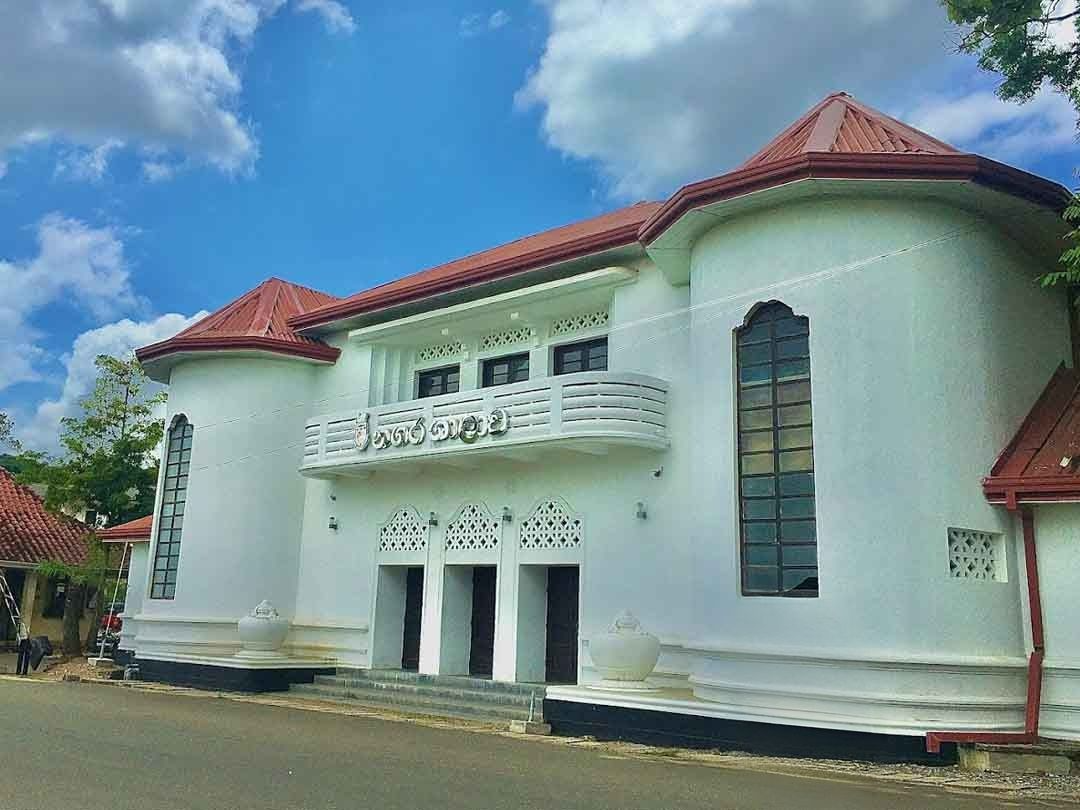
The Town Hall building.

The Kurunegala Municipality Council is responsible for the overall administration, sanitary, welfare, and other general activities of the city. The Municipality Council headed by a mayor with 21 other elected members. The 21 elected members represent the following wards:

- Gangoda
- Wewa
- Central
- Yanthampalawa
- Illuppugedara
- Madamegama
- Wehera
- Udawalpola
- Bazzar
- Gettuwana
- Polaththapitiya
- Teliyagonna (Upper)
- Teliyagonna (Lower)

== Transportation ==
Kurunegala is a central city in Sri Lanka. It is directly connected to a large number of major cities and towns of the island.

Kurunegala can be reached by the railway on the Northern railway line.

By road, it is connected to Colombo, Kandy, Matale, Puttalam, Trincomalee, Kuliyapitiya, Negombo, Anuradhapura and Kegalle. Due to its status as a crossroads city, the city is a good base for exploring important ancient landmarks a short distance away.

The Kurunegala central bus stand, opened in 2005, is one of Sri Lanka's most efficient and modern bus stands, with a parking capacity of about 200 buses.

=== Central Expressway ===
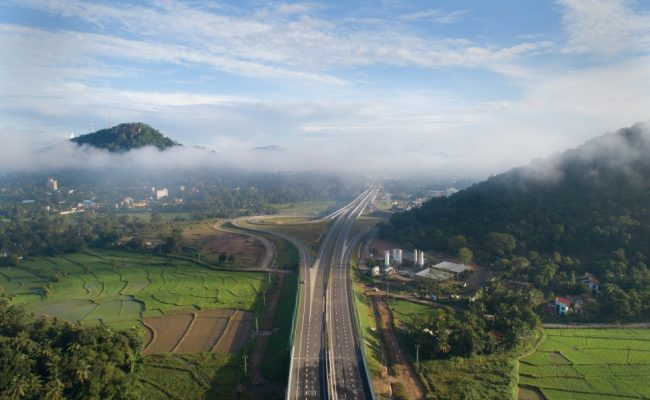
Central Expressway Kurunegala

Under the directives of the Ministry of Highways, the Road Development Authority initiated a study to identify a suitable road corridor to construct the expressway from Kadawatha to Dambulla via Kurunegala under the Central Expressway (Sri Lanka) Project. The second stage of the construction of the Project (CEP Project-2) from Mirigama to Kurunegala was launched on 1 February 2017. The expressway route passes through Gampaha, Mirigama, and Kurunegala, before ending at Dambulla. The project is being implemented in four stages: from Kadawatha to Mirigama (37 km), Mirigama to Kurunegala (39.28 km), Pothuhera to Galagedara (32.5 km), and Kurunegala to Dambulla (60.3 km). The section from Meerigama to Kurunegala was officially opened to the public on 15 January 2022. Interchanges from Meerigama include Narammala, Dambokka, Kurunegala, and Yaggapitiya. Public bus services began operating on the expressway on 20 January 2022.

== Economy ==
Many major corporations have large branch offices in Kurunegala and many industries including textiles, Sri Lankan gemstones, furniture, information technology, and jewellery are found there.

Ancient Economy During the Kurunegala epoch, the economy then was based on agriculture, trade, and taxes. The king's income primarily came from agricultural produce, with farmers contributing a portion of their harvest, as well as from precious gems such as pearls, moonstones, and blue diamonds.

Today, Kurunegala remains an important economic and cultural hub in Sri Lanka. The city's historical legacy of agricultural prosperity and trade continues to influence its modern economic activities, blending tradition with contemporary development.

== Health care ==
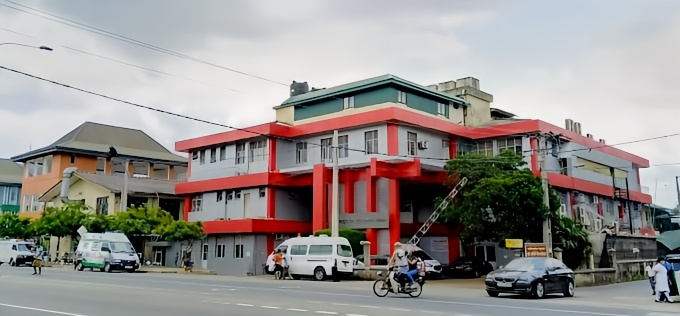
Teaching Hospital Kurunegala

The Teaching Hospital Kurunegala is the only one of that kind in NWP, is situated on the Colombo Kurunegala road about 0.75 k.m. away from the city towards Colombo. Teaching Hospital Kurunegala is one of the largest hospitals in Sri Lanka. The bed count is over 1700 and the staff is over 3500. The hospital spreads over 35 acres land and serves people through more than 100 units. The teaching hospital Kurunegala caters more than 1.2 million patients annually. This number includes the patients from the other districts also, namely Anuradhapura, Polonnaruwa, Trincomalee, and Mathale.

== Education ==
Kurunegala is home to some of the island's oldest and leading schools.

=== National schools ===
- Athugalpura Prince College - Kurunegala
- Bishop Lakdas de Mel College – Kurunegala
- D. B. Welagedara Central College - Kurunegala
- Defence Service College - Kurunegala
- D. S. Senanayake Central College - Kurunegala
- Hindu Tamil Maha Vidyalayam – Kurunegala
- Hisbullah Central College - Kurunegala
- Holy Family Convent – Kurunegala
- Maliyadeva Adarsha Maha Vidyalaya - Kurunegala
- Maliyadeva Balika Vidyalaya – Kurunegala
- Maliyadeva College – Kurunegala
- President Girls College - Kurunegala
- Sir John Kotalawala College – Kurunegala
- Sri Nissanka Maha Vidyalaya – Kurunegala
- St. Anne's College – Kurunegala
- Vishvoda College - Kurunegala
- Wayamba Royal College – Kurunegala
- Zahira Central College - Kurunegala
- S. W. R. D. Bandaranayaka College - Kurunegala

=== Private/international schools ===
- Amana International School
- Cardiff International School
- Lexicon International School
- Lyceum International School
- Royal International School
- Sussex College Kurunegala
- Unique International College
- Wayamba International School

=== Tertiary education ===
The Sri Lanka Institute of Advanced Technological Education - Kurunegala branch is located in Wilgoda at the center of the city.The Wayamba University of Sri Lanka is situated in Kuliyapitiya, while the Open University of Sri Lanka, the Sri Lanka Institute of Information Technology, the National Institute of Business Management, the College of Technology, the National Apprentice Industrial Training Authority, the Wayamba Technical College, the National Youth Council and the Vocational Training Authority have centres in the city. Most of the private-sector higher educational institutions also have branches in Kurunegala.

== Sports ==
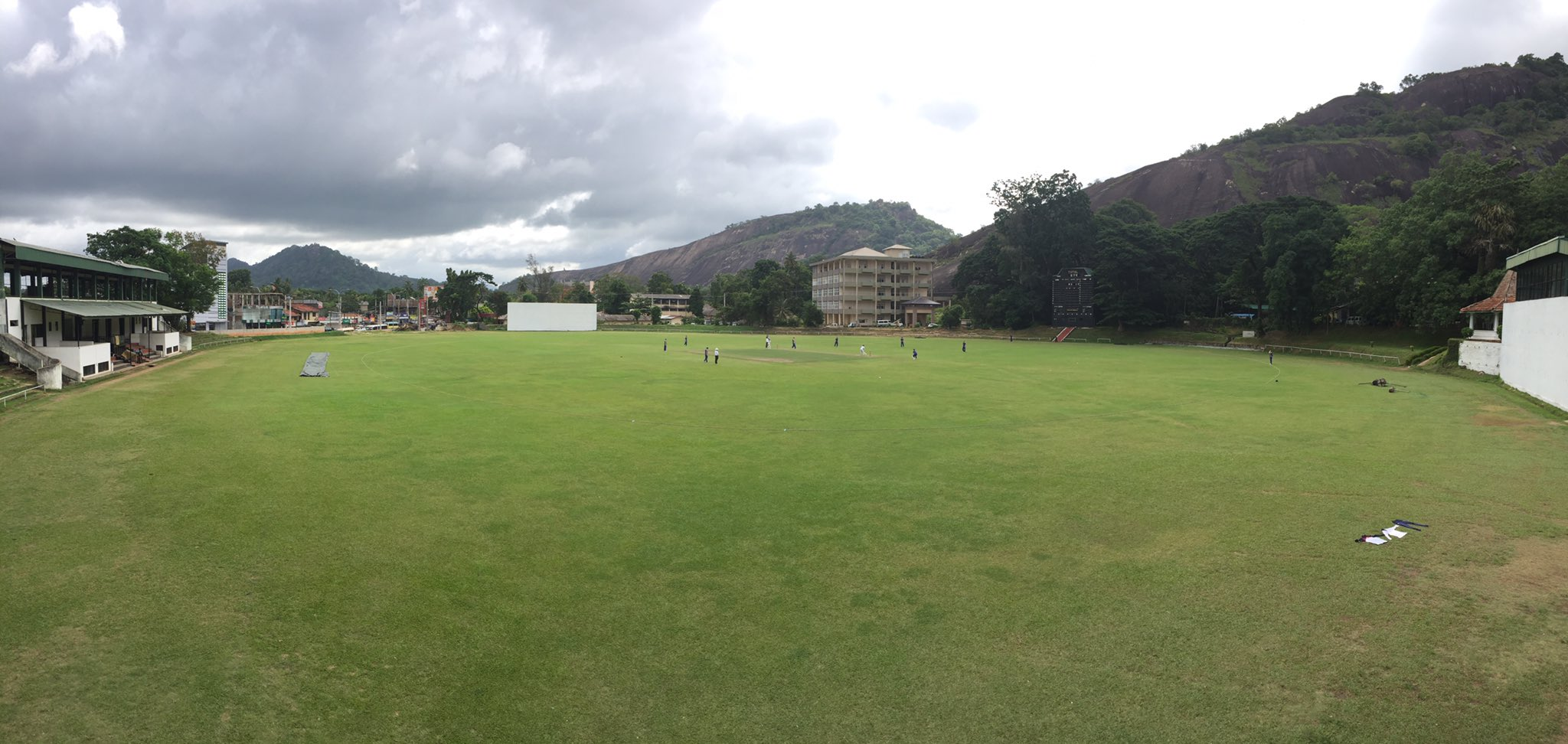
Welagedara stadium.

Major sporting venues in and around Kurunegala include:

- Welagedara Stadium is the top sporting venue in Kurunegala. It regularly hosts First Class Cricket matches that are international and local types.
- Maliga Pitiya Stadium
- St. Anne's College Sport Complex
- Maliyadeva Ground

Kurunegala is one of the outstation cities that is popular for cricket and produced a number of cricketers that represented the nation. One of the best known spin bowlers of all time in Sri Lanka, Rangana Herath is an iconic cricketer from Kurunegala.

== See also ==
- List of cities in Sri Lanka
- Kurunegala Municipal Council
- Kurunegala train crash
- List of tallest statues
- Wayamba Cricket Team
