= List of Kandurata representative cricketers =

This is a list of cricket players who have played representative cricket for Kandurata in Sri Lanka. Kandurata cricket team was founded in 1990. Kandurata has also competed under the name Central Province.

It includes players that have played at least one match, in senior First-Class, List A cricket, or Twenty20 matches. Practice matches are not included, unless they have officially been classified at First-class tour matches.

The Inter-Provincial Cricket Tournament is the premier domestic cricket competition in Sri Lanka. It was founded in 1990.

== First-class players ==
All of the players who have represented Kandurata in First-Class domestic competitions:

- 1. Roshan Mahanama
- 2. Brendon Kuruppu
- 3. Damien Nadarajah
- 4. Dhamika Bulankulame
- 5. Ravi Ratnayeke
- 6. Sanjeeva Ranatunga
- 7. Nishantha Ranatunga
- 8. Lalithamana Fernando
- 9. Ruwan Kalpage
- 10. Piyal Wijetunge
- 11. Nilantha Ratnayake
- 12. Muttiah Muralitharan
- 13. Ashley de Silva
- 14. Chinthaka Edirimanne
- 15. Tuan Miskin
- 16. Vajira Silva
- 17. Tudor Gunaratne
- 18. Upali Kodituwakku
- 19. Naushad Samath
- 20. C. N. Dissanayake
- 21. Thirana Gamage
- 22. Thusara Kodikara
- 23. Tuan Sawall
- 24. N. Herathge
- 25. S. Naramapanawa
- 26. Senaka Dissanayake
- 27. Chaminda Rajapakse
- 28. Sanath Fernando
- 29. Pubudu Dassanayake
- 30. Ravi Punchihewa
- 31. Praveen Ramanathan
- 32. Jayaweera Bandara
- 33. R. Boruppa
- 34. Sajith Fernando
- 35. Mohamed Ajaz
- 36. Dharshana Kalansooriya
- 37. Chaminda Kodikara
- 38. Hasan Rushdy
- 39. Dileepa Sumanarathne
- 40. Pushpakumara Serasinghe
- 41. Mohamed Rifan
- 42. Samantha Dodanwela
- 43. Mohamed Zameer
- 44. Nalin Nanayakkara
- 45. Krishnantha Gunawardene
- 46. Trishane Nonis
- 47. Daminda Kolugala
- 48. Priyantha Weragoda
- 49. Sampath Perera
- 50. Surath Liyanage
- 51. P. K. Aluwihare
- 52. Suwanji Madanayake
- 53. C. de Silva
- 54. Tharanga Paranavitana
- 55. Kumar Sangakkara
- 56. Thilan Samaraweera
- 57. Bathiya Perera
- 58. Thilina Kandamby
- 59. Hasantha Fernando
- 60. Kaushalya Weeraratne
- 61. Nuwan Zoysa
- 62. Ranil Dhammika
- 63. Ruchira Perera
- 64. Jeewan Mendis
- 65. Mario Villavarayan
- 66. Nihil Soysa
- 67. Dhammika Sudarshana
- 68. Dilruwan Perera
- 69. Dilhara Lokuhettige
- 70. Chamila Gamage
- 71. Nisitha Rupasinghe
- 72. Priyankara Silva
- 73. Kanchana Gunawardene
- 74. Daminda Ranaweera
- 75. Chinthaka Jayasinghe
- 76. Sachith Pathirana
- 77. Suraj Randiv
- 78. Seekkuge Prasanna
- 79. Chaminda Vidanapathirana
- 80. Dharshana Gamage
- 81. Nadeera Nawela
- 82. Akalanka Ganegama
- 83. Suresh Niroshan
- 84. Chanaka Wijesinghe
- 85. Chamara Kapugedera
- 86. Ishan Mutaliph
- 87. Alankara Asanka
- 88. Tyron Gamage
- 89. Sanjaya Gangodawila

== List A players ==
All of the Players who have represented Kandurata in List A cricket domestic one day competitions:

- 1. Muditha Wijekoon
- 2. Nuwan Ratnayake
- 3. Arosha Perera
- 4. Chanaka Wijesinghe
- 5. Chamara Kapugedera
- 6. Kosala Kulasekara
- 7. Duncan Arnolda
- 8. Daminda Ranaweera
- 9. Daminda Ranawaka
- 10. Akalanka Ganegama
- 11. Chaminda Vidanapathirana
- 12. Tharanga Paranavitana
- 13. Sajith Fernando
- 14. Kumar Sangakkara
- 15. Thilan Samaraweera
- 16. Chinthaka Jayasinghe
- 17. Kaushalya Weeraratne
- 18. Muttiah Muralitharan
- 19. Thilan Thushara
- 20. Suraj Randiv
- 21. Nisitha Rupasinghe
- 22. Jeewan Mendis
- 23. Seekkuge Prasanna
- 24. Dilhara Fernando
- 25. Sanjaya Gangodawila
- 26. Yohan de Silva
- 27. Saman Jayantha
- 28. Jehan Mubarak
- 29. Angelo Perera
- 30. Sachith Pathirana
- 31. Nuwan Kulasekara
- 32. Chathura Peiris
- 33. Hans Fernando
- 34. Farveez Maharoof
- 35. Sohan Boralessa

== Twenty20 players ==
All of the Players who have represented Kandurata in Twenty20 domestic competitions:

- 1. Dilshan Vitharana
- 2. Indika Senaratne
- 3. Akalanka Ganegama
- 4. Tharanga Paranavitana
- 5. Thilan Samaraweera
- 6. Jeewan Mendis
- 7. Chinthaka Jayasinghe
- 8. Amila Wethathasinghe
- 9. Nadeera Nawela
- 10. Sachith Pathirana
- 11. Chaminda Vidanapathirana
- 12. Kanchana Gunawardene
- 13. Thilan Thushara
- 14. Chamara Kapugedera
- 15. Kaushalya Weeraratne
- 16. Suraj Randiv
- 17. Kumar Sangakkara
- 18. Suresh Perera
- 19. Muttiah Muralitharan
- 20. Dilhara Fernando
- 21. Sanjaya Gangodawila
- 22. Seekkuge Prasanna
- 23. Suresh Niroshan
- 24. Kaniksha Alwitigala
- 25. Udara Jayasundera
- 26. Angelo Perera
- 27. Jehan Mubarak
- 28. Hasantha Fernando
- 29. Farveez Maharoof
- 30. Sanitha de Mel
- 31. Saliya Saman
- 32. Yohan de Silva
- 33. Chanaka Wijesinghe
- 34. Rajeeva Weerasinghe
- 35. Kasun Madushanka
