= Enderamulla =

Enderamulla එඬේරමුල්ල எந்தேரமுல்லை
- Town
- Location in Sri Lanka
- Coordinates: 6°59′N 79°55′E
- Country: Sri Lanka
- Province: Western Province
- District: Gampaha District
- Divisional secretariat: Mahara
- Elevation: 16 m (52 ft)

Population (2015)
  - Total: 4,531
- Time zone: UTC+05:30 (SLST)
- Postal code: 11300

Enderamulla (Sinhala: එඬේරමුල්ල) is a small village with a relatively large population situated in the Gampaha District, Western Province, Sri Lanka. The village is about 10.5 km (6.5 mi) north of Colombo. The closest urban settlement to Enderamulla is Wattala, which is situated on the (A3) Colombo-Negombo Road. St. Sebastian's Church, Enderamulla is one of the main attractions in Enderamulla.

History (Sinhala: ඉතිහාසය)

A small village established in ancient kingdom of Kelaniya to supply services and perform duties of the castle, located in the western corner of the ‘Siyane korale’(county), surrounded by the south of ‘Mudun Canal’, west of the ‘Eeri Canal’ and bounded on the west and south by ‘Kalu Oya. This whole area include three villages known as Enderamulla, Pinnameda and Gongitota. The family names of descendants, relics of ancient buildings and geographic characteristics declare the historical value of our village and church and its links to the Sri Lankan history.

Arrival of Portuguese in 1505 to the Western coast influence the expansion of Roman Catholic population, and historical writings indicate that Enderamulla was situated 8 miles north from the presidency of Portuguese which was under their command.

According to the legends, during the Portuguese period; first church was constructed at Enderamulla with the help of Franciscan and Jesuitical priests. This was later destroyed by the Dutch. According to folklore it was built in a place called ‘Gurugoda welyaya’. When the Dutch period of rule began in the late 17th century, Catholics and the church had to undergo severe hardship as Protestantism was introduced and enforced by the rulers.

After 150 years of time the second church was built during the British period of rule and dedicated it to St. Sebastian based on folklore of first church. In January 30, 1855, a catholic patron Hendalage Don Hendrik Cangon donated present land to church which was later called ‘Palliyawatta’ Construction of present church began with the blessings of Archbishop Christopher Bonjean in 1891 and completed in 1920 with endeavored 29 years of work.

In the beginning Enderamulla church was included in ‘Dalugama’ parish and when completed it was included in ‘Kirimetiyagara’ parish.

Endramulla St. Sebastian's Church is one of the largest parishes in the Diocese of Colombo. Its history reflects a longstanding tradition of Christian worship and service within the local community.

== Landmarks and notable places ==
- St. Sebastian's Church
- St. Sebastian's Maha Vidyalaya
- Enderamulla Railway Station
- Enderamulla Police Station
- St. Joseph's College, Wattala
- ගොංගිතොට විද්‍යා සාධක විදුහල
- Masjidul Firdous Jumma Mosque
- Tankiyawatta (ටැංකියවත්ත) Playground
