= St. Sebastian's Church, Enderamulla =

Roman Catholic church in Wattala, Sri Lanka

- Sinhala: සා. සෙබස්තියන් දේවස්ථානය, එඬේරමුල්ල
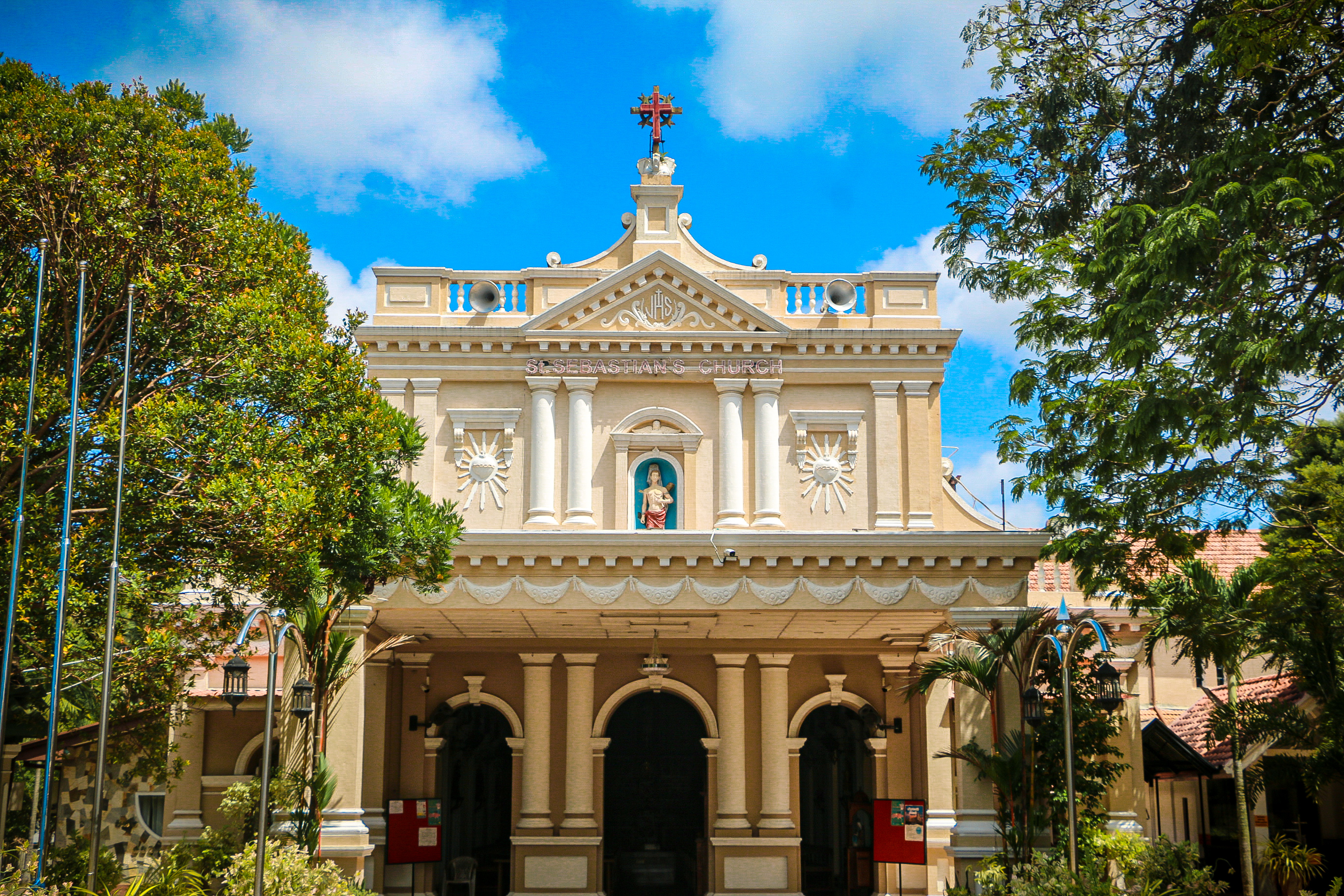
- Front facade
- St. Sebastian's Church, Enderamulla
- 6.9969°N 79.9168°E
- Location: Enderamulla, Wattala
- Country: Sri Lanka
- Languages: Sinhala; English; Latin (occasionally)
- Denomination: Catholic
- Website: Official Facebook page

History
- Status: Parish Church
- Founded: 1891; 135 years ago
- Dedication: Saint Sebastian
- Dedicated: 1920; 106 years ago

Architecture
- Functional status: Active
- Architectural type: Chapel
- Style: Neoclassical; Modern
- Groundbreaking: 1879; 147 years ago

Specifications
- Capacity: 700 (inside church building); 2500 (including front yard)

Administration
- District: Gampaha
- Province: Western Province
- Archdiocese: Colombo Archdiocese
- Parish: Enderamulla Parish

St. Sebastian's Church, Enderamulla (Sinhala: සා. සෙබස්තියන් දේවස්ථානය, එඬේරමුල්ල) is a Roman Catholic church in the Archdiocese of Colombo, Sri Lanka. It is located in Enderamulla, Wattala. Construction of the current church building began in 1879, and it was operational by 1891. After being a co‑parish with Dalugama (1879–1903) and Kirimetiyagara (1903–1934), it was declared an independent parish in 1934.

A tiny fragment of Saint Sebastian's forearm bone is preserved in a special reliquary, which is located together with the Monstrance in a glass chamber inside the eucharistic chapel on the left side of the main church building.

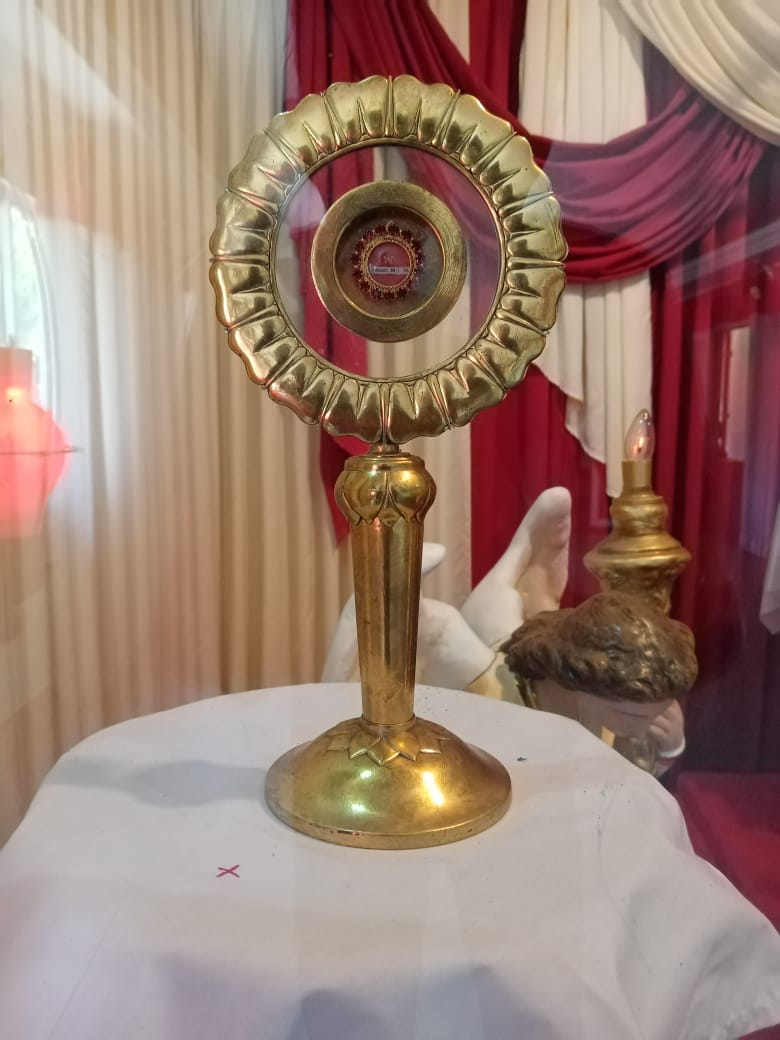
The reliquary at St. Sebastian's Church Enderamulla containing a bone fragment from the forearm of Saint Sebastian

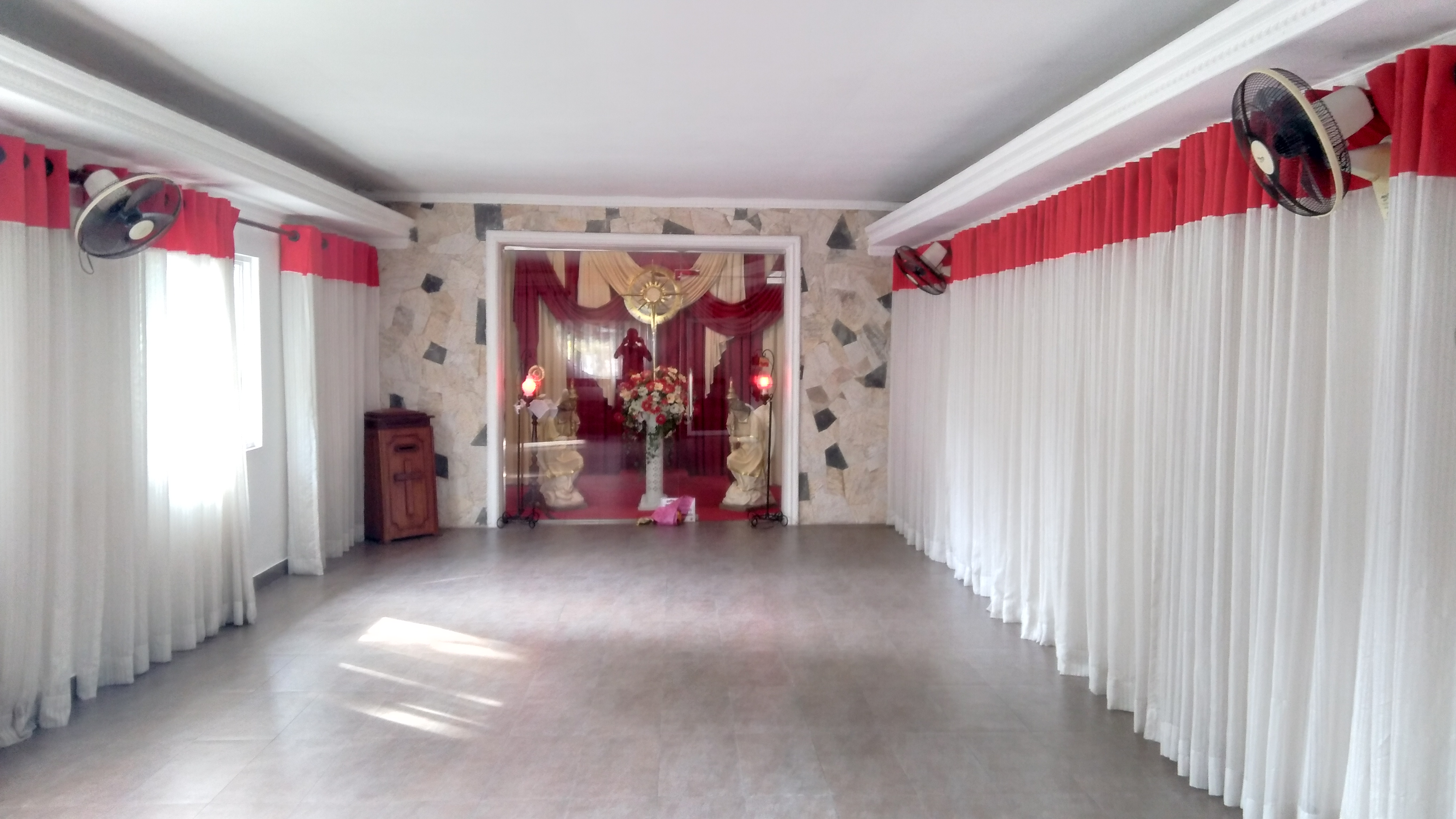
The glass chamber inside The Eucharistic chapel at St. Sebastian's Church, Enderamulla which holds the reliquary and the monstrance

== Parish priests ==
=== 1855–1879 ===
From 1855, before the current church building was established, and while Enderamulla was not yet officially a parish, the priests were of St. Sebastian's were: (Note: All entitled to honorific of "Rev. Fr.". In cases where the forenames or initials are not known, this listing retains the honorific of Fr, to aid comprehension.)

- Constantine Nevis
- Mathias Caitano
- Fr Brucio
- Fr Santangelo
- Fr Kanjamanathan
- Fr Mawar

=== 1879–1903 ===
Enderamulla was connected with Dalugama parish in 1879 (until 1903).

1879–1903
Priest	Period
Fr. Brucio	1879–1882
Bartholomew Rosere	1882–1882 (November)
Fr. Cardano	1882–1886
J. B. De Sampaio	1886–1895
E. Julian	1895–1897
P. Bulik	1897–1898
J. B. De Sampaio	1898–1903

=== 1903–1934 ===
Enderamulla was connected with Kirimetiyagara parish in 1903 until 1934.

1903–1934
Priest	Period
A. Guillaume	1903–1908
Leo Fernando	1908
Fr. Alas	1908–1910
J. B. De Sampaio	1910–1930
Fr. Guri	1930-1931
P. J. Fernando	1931–1933
Pebian Fernando	1933–1934

=== 1934–1973 ===
Enderamulla became an independent parish in 1934.

1934–1973: Independent parish
Priest	Period	Note
P. Bonipas Pieris	1934–1937	Constructed Holy water fonts in the doorways
P. Bulik	1937–1940	Introduced the service of Sisters of the Holy Family (of Bordeaux) to St. Sebastian's Maha Vidyalaya, Enderamulla
Don Wilfred Benedict	1940–1944	
Fr. Heuber	1944–1946	
J. Dhalpathadhu	1944–1946	
Fr. Mersels	1944–1946	
Don Winson	1944–1946	
J. M. Kerbul	1946–1951	
J. Hebesmo	1951–1951	
Fr. Pupon	1951–1954	
F. A. Desigo	1951–1954	
Winson Staullo	1954–1957	Constructed the ceiling on top of the Altar
Willam Perera	1957–1963	Elongated the north wing of the church building, planted shade trees in the front yard, introduced the weekly fair
Joseph Cabrall	1963–1967	Broke the traditions of priest offering the mass facing the alter and constructed an altar table to face the audience while the mass service
Kinsly C. Perera	1967–1972	Renovated church walls and roof, finished the elongation constructions of the north wing
Siril Joseph	1972–1973	

=== From 1973 ===
From 1973
Priest	Period	Note
Felix John Hettiarachchi	1973–1978	Installed pews to the church
Mervin Fernando	1978–1982	Constructed the Thuduwegedara church
Emil Perera	1982–1983	(co-parish priest)
Eyalas Weerakkodi	1982–1983	(co-parish priest)
Chris Abeyrathne	commenced 1983	
Anton Premalal	c. 2009 – c. 2011	
Prasanna Rohan	c. 2011 – c. 2013	
Ruben Leslie Silva	2017–2018	
Tharanga Sampath Perera	c. 2019 – c. 2023	
Sujeewa Athukorala	Incumbent from c. 2023	

== Bibliography ==
- Aivan Rasaia (2016). එඬේරමුල්ල ග්‍රාමයේ සැඟවුන අතීතය [The past of Ederamulla village]. දෙව්මැදුරයි අපේ ගමයි [The Church and our village] (in Sinhala).
- එඬේරමුල්ල සියවස් ජුබිලි සමරුව [Enderamulla Centenary Jubilee Celebration]. සියවස් සමරු කළඹ [Centenary Portfolio] (in Sinhala). 1991.
- Anandappa, J. B. Clinton, ed. (1990). The Catholic directory of Sri Lanka, 1989/90. J. B. C. Anandappa.
