= List of Sri Lankan cricket teams =

This is a list of Sri Lankan cricket teams who have played all forms of the game, past and present.

== Franchise teams ==
- Colombo Strikers
- Dambulla Sixers
- Galle Marvels
- Jaffna Kings
- Kandy Falcons

== Club teams ==
=== Current major clubs ===
These are the clubs with current first-class, List A and Twenty20 status who are playing in Sri Lanka's major tournaments: the SLC Major League Tournament, the SLC Major Clubs Limited Overs Tournament, and the SLC Major Clubs T20 Tournament.

- Ace Capital Cricket Club (formerly Seeduwa Raddoluwa Cricket Club to 2011 and Sri Lanka Ports Authority Cricket Club to 2020)
- Badureliya Sports Club
- Bloomfield Cricket and Athletic Club
- Burgher Recreation Club
- Chilaw Marians Cricket Club
- Colombo Cricket Club
- Colts Cricket Club
- Galle Cricket Club
- Kalutara Town Club
- Kandy Customs Cricket Club
- Kurunegala Youth Cricket Club
- Lankan Cricket Club
- Moors Sports Club
- Negombo Cricket Club
- Nondescripts Cricket Club
- Nugegoda Sports and Welfare Club
- Panadura Sports Club
- Police Sports Club
- Ragama Cricket Club
- Saracens Sports Club
- Sebastianites Cricket and Athletic Club
- Sinhalese Sports Club
- Sri Lanka Air Force Sports Club
- Sri Lanka Army Sports Club
- Sri Lanka Navy Sports Club
- Tamil Union Cricket and Athletic Club

=== Former first-class clubs ===
- Antonians Sports Club (first-class 1991–92 to 2002–03, and in 2010–11)
- Kalutara Physical Culture Centre (first-class in 2016–17)
- Kandy Cricket Club (first-class 2001 to 2007)
- Kandy Youth Cricket Club (first-class in 1991–92)
- Kurunegala Sports Club (first-class in 1992–93)
- Matara Sports Club (first-class 1997 to 2001)
- Nomads Sports Club (extinct; last first-class in 1995)
- Old Cambrians Sports Club (first-class in 1991–92)
- Rio Sports Club (first-class in 2001–02)
- Seeduwa Raddoluwa Cricket Club (became Sri Lanka Ports Authority Cricket Club in 2011)
- Singha Sports Club (first-class 1989 to 2011)
- Sri Lanka Ports Authority Cricket Club (became Ace Capital Cricket Club in 2020)
- Sri Lanka Schools (first-class 2001 to 2003)

Some of these clubs continue to field teams, but at sub-first-class level.

== Provincial teams ==
A former first-class tournament in which the following teams participated:

- Basnahira North cricket team (1992–2003, 2008–2010)
- Basnahira South cricket team (1992–2003, 2008–2010)
- Kandurata cricket team (1990–2010)
- Nagenahira cricket team (2010)
- North Central Province cricket team (2004–2005)
- Ruhuna cricket team (1990–2010)
- Sri Lanka Cricket Combined XI (2010)
- Sri Lanka Schools XI cricket team (2008–2009)
- Uthura cricket team (2010)
- Uva cricket team (2004, 2010)
- Wayamba cricket team (1990–2010)
- Western Province City cricket team (1991–1992)
- Western Province Suburbs cricket team (1991–1992)
- Western Province (1990–1991, 2003–2004)
