= Malcolm Rodrigo =

Sri Lankan cricketer (??–??)

Malcolm Rodrigo was a Sri Lankan cricketer. He was a right-handed batsman and a right-arm medium-pace bowler who played for Antonians.

Rodrigo made two appearances during the 1992/93 Saravanamuttu Trophy competition, though he took little part in the first, securing just one catch and bowling a single over, as the team ran out innings victors against Rio - thanks in the main to a career best 236 not out from Thusara Kodikara.

He scored 1 and 3 in his second match, bowling a single over as the team slumped to a ten-wicket defeat.
