= Mahesh Hemantha =

Sri Lankan cricketer

Mahesh Hemantha was a Sri Lankan cricketer. He was a right-handed batsman.

Hemantha made his first-class debut during the Saravanamuttu Trophy competition of 1991–92, playing for Kalutara Physical Culture Centre. Hemantha's career began unsteadily, though in the last of his six matches for the team, in their only year of first-class cricket, he hit a career-best 163, which single-handedly accounted for nearly 70 percent of the total number of runs he scored in his entire first-class career – and the best first-class score for any Kalutara player.

While Kalutara did not enter first-class cricket the following season, Hemantha switched teams to play for Antonians Sports Club. Hemantha slotted into the lower order for most of the games he played for Antonians, he played his final three innings as an opener alongside team-mate Pathmanath Perera.
