= Gayan de Silva =

Gayan de Silva may refer to:

- Gayan de Silva (Bahraini cricketer)
- Gayan de Silva (Sri Lankan cricketer, born 1988)
- Gayan de Silva (Sri Lankan cricketer, born 1990)
