= National Savings Bank =

National Savings Bank may refer to:

- National Savings Bank (Malaysia), a government-owned savings bank in Malaysia.
- National Savings and Investments, a government-owned savings bank in the United Kingdom, which was formerly known as the National Savings Bank.
- National Savings Bank (Sri Lanka), a government-owned savings bank in Sri Lanka.
