= Ramesh Manjula =

Sri Lankan cricketer

Ramesh Manjula was a Sri Lankan cricketer. He was a left-handed batsman who played for Kalutara Town Club.

Manjula made a single first-class appearance for the team during the 1996-97 Saravanamuttu Trophy campaign, Kalutara's only season in first-class cricket, against Singha Sports Club. Batting from the lower order, Manjula hit six runs in the first innings in which he batted, and three runs in the second.

Manjula bowled nearly three overs in the game, conceding nine runs.
