= Serasinghe =

Serasinghe is a surname. Notable people with the surname include:

- Herbert Clifford Serasinghe, Ceylonese physician
- Iranganie Serasinghe (born 1927), Sri Lankan actress
- Pushpakumara Serasinghe (born 1963), Sri Lankan cricketer
- Sachithra Serasinghe (born 1987), Sri Lankan cricketer
- Sawan Serasinghe (born 1994), Australian badminton player
