= Mahanama College =

Buddhist school for boys in Colombo, Sri Lanka

- මහානාම විද්‍යාලය

Location
- R. A. D. Mel Mawatha; Colombo 03; Sri Lanka; 6°54′22″N 79°51′15″E

Information
- Type: Government 1AB National School
- Motto: විද්වතා සෑම තැනකදීම පැසසුම් ලබයි Vidvān Sarvatra Pūjyate (A scholar is respected everywhere)
- Religious affiliation: Buddhist
- Established: 5 January 1954
- Founder: Mawiththara Rewatha Thero
- Principal: Ravilal Wijayawansha
- Staff: 350
- Grades: 1 to 13
- Gender: Male
- Enrollment: 5,000+
- Language: English, Sinhala
- Colours: Gold, silver and black
- Song: සිරි ලක වොරදන "Sri Lanka Wardhana"
- Sports: Cricket, rugby, basketball, athletics, football, boxing
- Affiliation: Ministry of Education
- Alumni: Mahanamians, Golden Army, The Golds
- Website: mahanamacollege.lk

Mahanama College is a Buddhist public national school for boys in Kollupitiya, Sri Lanka, established in 1954. It provides primary and secondary education.

Mahanama College is located in Colombo with its main entrance on Richard Aluwihare de Mel Mawatha, Colombo 3. The southern boundary of the campus adjoins Ladies' College, Colombo.

== History ==
Mahanama College was founded on 5 January 1954 by Ven. Mawiththara Rewatha Thero at the Walukarama Temple in Kollupitiya, with an initial enrollment of five students. The school relocated to the site at Walukarama after initially operating from nearby locations, with primary classes temporarily held at Thurstan College. In 1958, the school was registered as a government-assisted junior school.

In the mid-1970s, the Sri Lankan government allocated approximately 2.8 ha (6.9 acres) of land to support expansion. By 1976, the campus included several two-storey academic buildings, with facilities such as additional classrooms and a dental unit.

During the 1990s, the school expanded its extracurricular and inter-school activities. The annual school carnival, Foot-Loose, was introduced, and the "Battle of the Golds", the annual cricket match between Mahanama College and D. S. Senanayake College, started in 1999. A three-storey building incorporating an art gallery was also completed that year.

In 2014, Mahanama College's 60th anniversary and annual prize-giving were held under the patronage of President Mahinda Rajapaksa and Bandula Gunawardena.

== Administration ==
As a national school, the college receives funds from the Ministry of Education, which appoints the principal of the school. The school is divided into a primary school, a middle school, and an upper school, each with its own headteacher.

Mahanama College only admits Buddhist students. Sinhala is the language of instruction in the school, though students can choose between Sinhala and English as their language of instruction for higher education.

== Principals ==
- Vahalle Dhammananda Thero (1954–1960)
- J. D. A. Jayakody (1960–1968)
- N. E. Fernando (1968–1974)
- T. S. Silva (1974–1976)
- K. N. P. de Silva (1976–1986)
- D. G. Sumanasekara (1986–1990)
- K. K. Ratnadasa (1990–1999)
- G. Liyanage (1999–2003)
- W. H. Premalal Kumarasiri (2003–2012)
- U. M. Prasanna Upashantha (2013–2016)
- L. M. D. Dharmasena (2016–2020)
- R. A. R. M. Rathnayake (2020–2021)
- A. M. A. A. C. Perera (2021–2023)
- Prabath Withanage (2023–2026)
- I. K. K. Ravilal Wijayawansha (2026–present)

== Sports ==
Eighteen sports are played at Mahanama College.

=== Cricket ===
Mahanama College established its first U11 cricket team in 1979, with the help of coach Vernon Perera and principal K. N. P. de Silva.

Mahanama College has achieved significant success in school cricket, including being crowned the best team of the Western Province in Division One - Tier "A" for the 2023/24 season, winning the SLSCA Under-13 Division II Cricket Tournament, and reaching the U19 Division 1 Limited Over tournament.

Other achievements have included:

- Champions of Singer U17 Division I Schools Cricket Tournament in 2019.
- Champions in the U13 Division II Schools Cricket Tournament in 2024.
- Runners up in Sri Lanka U17 Division I Schools Cricket Tournament 2025.
- Champions of Sri Lanka U19 Division 1 Schools Cricket Tournament 2025.
- Champions of the Nalanda Centennial Cricket Tournament 2026 by defeating St. Benedict's College,Ananda College,Nalanda College,Royal College,S. Thomas' College, Mount Lavinia, and Thurstan College.

==== Special inter-school events ====
Mahanama College established their first annual 'Big Match' with President's College, Rajagiriya. The inaugural Big Match between the two schools took place in March 1991. This annual event was held 16 times, of which President's College won 13 matches.

From 2007 onward, Mahanama College's primary annual cricket big match has been the "Battle of the Golds" against D. S. Senanayake College, Colombo, which is held at the Sinhalese Sports Club Cricket Ground. Ahead of the match, the Old Boys' Association of Mahanama College organises the Golden Parade, a vehicular parade through the streets of Colombo with decorated Double-decker buses, trucks, cars, SUVs, and motorbikes, accompanied by music and dancing.

| Year | Result | Ref. |
|---|---|---|
| 2007 | Lost | —N/a |
| 2008 | Won | —N/a |
| 2009 | Lost | —N/a |
| 2010 | Won | —N/a |
| 2011 | Lost | —N/a |
| 2012 | Won | |
| 2013 | Won | |
| 2014 | —N/a | —N/a |
| 2015 | Lost | |
| 2016 | Won | |
| 2017 | Won | |
| 2018 | Won | |
| 2019 | Won | |
| 2020 | Postponed due to COVID-19 | —N/a |
| 2021 | Postponed due to COVID-19 | —N/a |
| 2022 | Won | |
| 2023 | Won | —N/a |
| 2024 | Won | |
| 2025 | Won | |
| 2026 | Won | |

First held in 2025, the T20 Encounter of Battle of the Golds is a friendly rivalry T20 cricket match between Mahanama College and D. S. Senanayake College, competing for the K. N. P. de Silva Memorial Trophy, named in honour of the former principal of Mahanama College from 1976 to 1986.

| Year | Result | Ref. |
|---|---|---|
| 2025 | Won | |
| 2026 | Lost | |

=== Rugby ===
Rugby began at Mahanama College in 1986. The school were runners-up in the all-island Division One Tournament in 1994/1995, and again runners-up in the Premier Division 01 – Segment "B" in 2008/2009.

In 2024, the school was crowned champions of the Premier Trophy in 2024, defeating Ananda College, and won the championship title in Division 1 Segment B of the Dialog Schools Rugby League, earning them a spot in the top-tier league for 2025. In the 2025 season, they finished runners-up of The Bowl Segment of Division One Group "A" in the Dialog Schools Rugby League. They secured their first victory in the Dialog Schools Rugby League in 2025.

Several alumni of the college have represented the Sri Lanka national rugby union team, including Kapila Knowlton (1994), Mithun Hapugoda and Darshana Dabare (2019).

=== Basketball ===
In the 2019, 2nd semi-final of the Boys' U17 All Island "B" Division Basketball Championship, the team was awarded 3rd place.

The Battle of the Golds basketball encounter takes place every year where Mahanama College compete with D. S. Senanayake College.

=== Boxing ===
The Boxing Committee was founded in 2014. Boxers from Mahanama College became the champions of the 43rd L.V. Jayaweera Interschool meet in 2016, where Kasun Fernando received the "Best Boxer" award, and again at the 46th L.V. Jayaweera Interschool meet in 2022, where Y. M. Anura Yapa, the college's boxing coach, received "Best Coach" award.

In 2019, the team achieved a 3rd place overall at the All-Island Junior Boxing Championship, bringing home a gold, silver, and bronze medal.

W.T.L.M. Abeysekera, R.I.R. Perera, K.A.V.S. Karavita, and H.S. Nambuwasam were among the college's winning boxers in the Stubbs Shield Boxing Championship, in the Junior and Youth Boys categories. St. Sylvester's College was the eventual winner, securing its fourth consecutive title. The tournament saw nearly 500 boxers from 132 schools competing.

=== Athletics ===
Athletes from Mahanama College won merit certificate awards in four age groups (under 12, 13, 14, and 15) at the John Tarbet Junior Athletic Meet held in October 2016 at Embilipitiya.

== Societies ==
=== Mahanama College Media Unit ===
The Media Unit of Mahanama College (MCMU) was established in 1987. The MCMU website was awarded in Sri Lanka's BestWeb.lk web design competition in 2020.

=== Leo Club ===
The Mahanama Leo Club was founded in 1987, operating under Leo District 306 D7. In 2024/2025, the club was named the most outstanding school-based Leo Club in Sri Lanka and the Maldives, as well as in Leo District 306 C2.

== Notable alumni ==
| Name | Notability |
|---|---|
| Danushka Gunathilaka | International cricketer |
| Dhananjaya de Silva | International Cricketer |
| Chathura Randunu | First Class cricketer |
| Pavan Rathnayake | International Cricketer |
| Sonal Dinusha | International Cricketer |
| Dilesh Gunaratne | International cricketer |
| Lalithamana Fernando | International cricketer, member of the Sri Lanka national cricket team who played the first one-day international match in 1989 |
| Hasitha Lakmal de Silva | International cricketer |
| Malindu Maduranga | First Class cricketer |
| Heshan Hettiarchchi | First Class cricketer |
| Shasheendra Rajapaksa | Minister of Parliament, 6th Chief Minister of Uva, The son of Chamal Rajapaksa |
| C. D. Wickramaratne | 35th Inspector General of Police of Sri Lanka |
| Eranga Weeraratne | Minister of Parliament, engineer, business executive, National List Member of Parliament |
| Jayantha Kularathna | Chief of Staff of the Sri Lanka Navy |
| Channa Weerasuriya | Colonel,Sri Lanka Army |
| Chandana Welikala, | Director of Administration,Sri Lanka Air Force |
| Pradeep Rathnayake | Dean of the Department of Languages, Cultural Studies and Performing Arts at University of Sri Jayawardenepura |
