= Nilantha =

Nilantha is a given name. Notable people with the name include:

- Nilantha Bopage (born 1972), Sri Lankan cricketer
- Nilantha Cooray (born 1978), Sri Lankan cricketer
- Nilantha Jayawardena, Sri Lankan police officer
- Nilantha Premaratne, Sri Lankan army general and 26th Commander of the Army
- Nilantha Ratnayake (born 1968), Sri Lankan cricketer
- Nilantha Tillakaratne (born 1977), Sri Lankan cricketer
