= Ernest Perera =

23rd Inspector General of Police (Sri Lanka)
- In office 1 August 1988 – 29 November 1993
- Preceded by: Cyril Herath
- Succeeded by: Frank de Silva

Personal details
- Born: Ernest Edward Boniface Perera; 29 November 1932 Dalugama, Sri Lanka
- Died: 16 August 2013 (aged 80) Colombo, Sri Lanka
- Resting place: General Cemetery (Kanatte)
- Spouse: Enid
- Profession: Police officer

Ernest Edward Boniface Perera (29 November 1932 – 16 August 2013) was the 23rd Inspector General of the Sri Lanka Police, serving between 1988 and 1993.

Ernest Edward Boniface Perera was born on 29 November 1932 in Dalugama, a suburb of Colombo, the son of John Henry Perera and Agnes. He went to school at St. Benedict's College, Colombo and later Saint Joseph's College, Colombo, graduating with a Bachelor of Economics (BEc Hons) from the University of Peradeniya in 1956.

Perera then joined the Ceylon Police on 5 January 1957 as a probationary Assistant Superintendent of Police (ASP). His first appointment, following training, was the ASP in charge of the Galle District in 1958. In 1970, he was appointed the Senior Superintendent of Police (SSP) of the Nuwara Eliya division and the following year, was placed in charge of the Matara District. In 1977, he served as Deputy Inspector General of Police (DIG) of Colombo Range before he was appointed Inspector General of the Sri Lanka Police (IGP) on 1 August 1988.

He also served as the chairman of Police Rugby Club during the club's dominance of local rugby in the late 1980s and early 1990s.

In June 1990, during his tenure as IGP, Perera instructed police officers at all police stations in the Eastern Province to surrender to members of the Liberation Tigers of Tamil Eelam (LTTE), at the request of President Ranasinghe Premadasa, which resulted in the subsequent mass murder of over 600 unarmed police by the LTTE. The massacre triggered the start of the second Eelam War.

Perera retired from the police service on 29 November 1993. After his retirement, from 1994 to 1995, he served as Sri Lanka’s High Commissioner in Malaysia.

Perera died on 16 August 2013, at the age of 80, and is buried in the General Cemetery (Kanatte).

Police appointments
Preceded by Cyril Herath	Inspector General of Police; 1988–1993	Succeeded by Frank de Silva
