= Pawuththuwadura Milton =

Sri Lankan cricketer (born 1966)

Personal information
- Full name: Pawuththuwadura Milton
- Born: 27 June 1966 (age 60); Ambalangoda, Sri Lanka
- Batting: Right-handed
- Bowling: Right-arm fast
- Role: All-rounder

Domestic team information
- Years: Team
- Singha Sports Club
- Antonians Cricket Club
- Source: Cricinfo, 18 February 2016

Pawuththuwadura Milton (born 27 June 1966) is a Sri Lankan former first-class cricketer who played for Antonians Sports Club and Singha Sports Club. Milton played first-class cricket from 1989/90 - 2001 and List-A cricket from 1992/93 - 1999/00.
