= Ian Coggins =

Sri Lankan cricketer (born 1969)

Ian Coggins (born 27 April 1969) is a Sri Lankan cricketer. He is a right-handed batsman and wicket-keeper who played for Moors Sports Club.

He was born in Colombo. Coggins made a single first-class appearance for the side, during the 1994–95 season, against Antonians Sports Club. From the upper-middle order, he scored 5 runs in the first innings in which he batted, and 11 runs in the second.

In February 2020, he was named in Sri Lanka's squad for the Over-50s Cricket World Cup in South Africa. However, the tournament was cancelled during the third round of matches due to the coronavirus pandemic.
