= Dalupitiya =

Sri Lankan village

Coordinates: 7°00′N 79°56′E

Dalupitiya is a small village situated in the western part of Sri Lanka. The distance to Colombo, the commercial capital of Sri Lanka, is about 10 miles from Kirimetiyagara. The closest city to Dalupitiya is Kadawatha, which is on the Kandy Road.
