= Inter-Provincial Cricket =

Inter-Provincial Cricket Tournament
- Countries: Sri Lanka
- Administrator: Sri Lanka Cricket
- Format: First-class, List A, Twenty20
- First edition: 1990
- Tournament format: Round-robin tournament and knockout
- Number of teams: 5

Inter-Provincial Cricket was a cricket tournament that included the three domestic cricket competitions in Sri Lanka. It started with the Inter-Provincial First Class Tournament in 1990 because of the general idea that club cricket alone would be not enough to keep Sri Lanka cricket competitive. The tournament stopped after the 1994–95 season but was revived 10 years later with the 2003–04 season and disestablished again in 2010. Sri Lanka remains today as the only Test cricket playing country to have club cricket as their form of first-class cricket with the Premier Trophy. The Inter-Provincial Limited Over Tournament and Inter-Provincial Twenty20 were created for the 2007–08 domestic season. The last First Class Tournament was held in 2009–10. The Twenty20 tournament was last held in 2011 and subsequently replaced by the Sri Lanka Premier League.

== History ==
From the tournament's inauguration, participating teams varied from year to year. 1990 the tournament started with four provincial teams. They were Western Province, Central Province, Southern Province and North Western Province. But in 1991 Western province as the major player contributor to Sri Lankan Cricket had two teams, the City team and the Suburb team. Then three teams in 1992 and therefore total teams participating was six. In 1993 Western Province presented three teams again as one City team and two suburban teams. After nearly 10 years of hiatus, the tournament revived in 2004. Teams yet again changed, only one team from the Western province and teams for North Central Province, Uva Province participated for the first time. Then again in 2008 Limited Over Tournament comprised two teams from Western province. For the Twenty20 Tournament 2008, five provincial teams and schools invited team participated.

== Teams ==
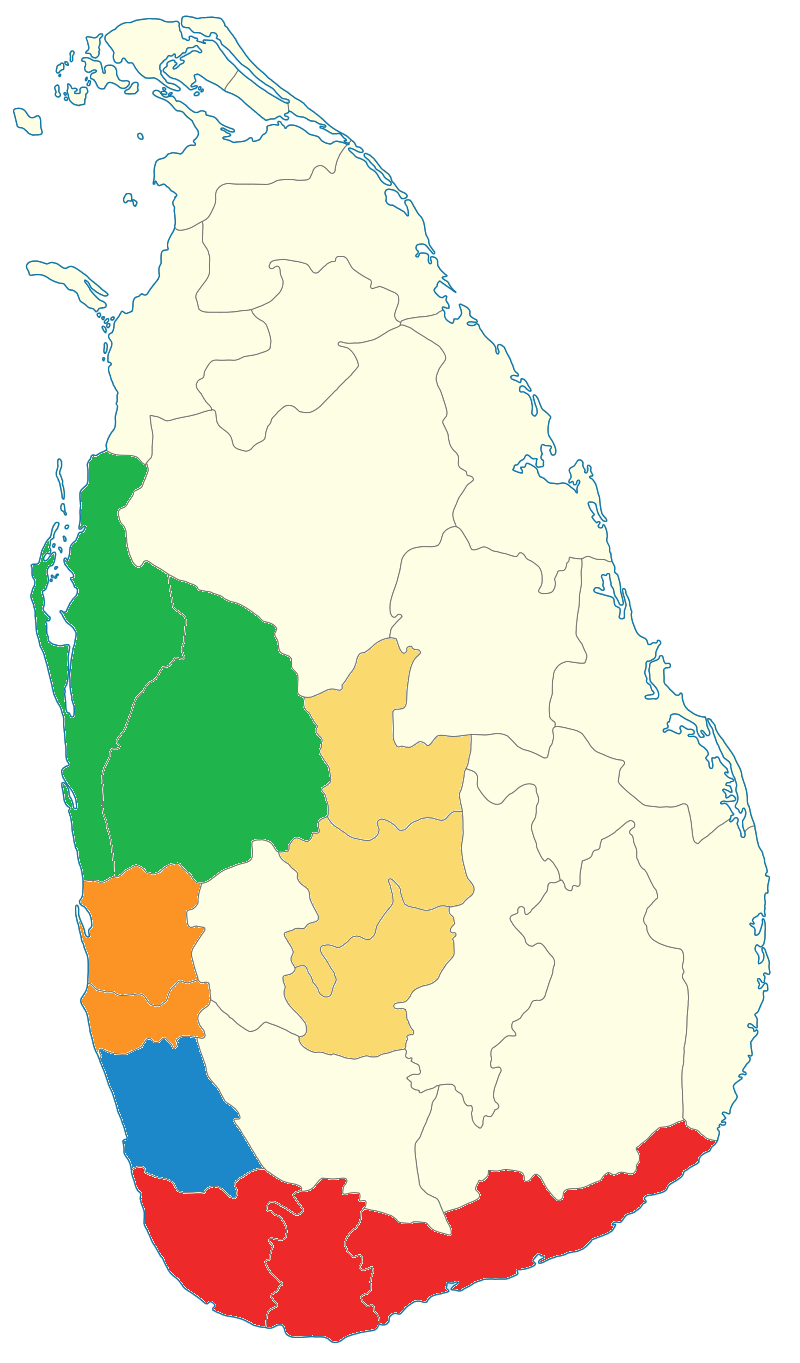
Inter-Provincial Twenty20 teams.

=== Teams participation by series ===
List of the teams for each tournament as follows.

Team	Series						
Team	1990	1990/91	1992	1993/94	1994/95	2003/04	2004/05
Western Province	Western Province	City, Suburbs	Suburbs, North, South	City, North, South		Western Province	
Central Province	Central Province						
Southern Province	Southern Province						
North Western Province	North Western Province						
North Central Province						North Central Province	
Uva Province						Uva Province	

=== Teams participation by series, from 2007/08 ===
From the 2007/08 Inter-provincial limited overs tournament started naming teams in Sinhalese.

Team	Series			
Team	2007/08	2008/09	2009/10	2010/11
Western Province	Basnahira North, Basnahira South			Basnahira
Central Province	Kandurata			
Southern Province	Ruhuna			
North Western Province	Wayamba			
Uva Province				Uva
Eastern Province				Nagenahira
Sri Lanka Schools XI	Sri Lanka School XI (Twenty20 only)			

=== Current teams ===
Team name	Home ground	First season
Basnahira North; Western Province North	R. Premadasa Stadium	1992 as Western Province in 1990
Basnahira South; Western Province South	Sinhalese Sports Club Ground	1992 as Western Province in 1990
Kandurata; Central Province	Asgiriya Stadium	1990
Ruhuna; Southern Province	Galle International Stadium	1990
Wayamba; North Western Province	Welagedara Stadium	1990

=== Former Teams ===
Team name	Home ground	First season
Western Province; Western Province		1990
Western Province City; Western Province Cities		1990–91
Western Province Suburbs; Western Province Suburbs		1990–91
North Central Province; North Central Province		2003–04
Uva; Uva		2003–04

== See also ==
- Inter-Provincial First Class Tournament
- Inter-Provincial Limited Over Tournament
- Inter-Provincial Twenty20
