= St. Anthony's College, Wattala =

St. Anthony's College, Wattala.
- ශා. අන්තෝනි විද්‍යාලය சாந்த அந்தோனியார் வித்தியாலயம்
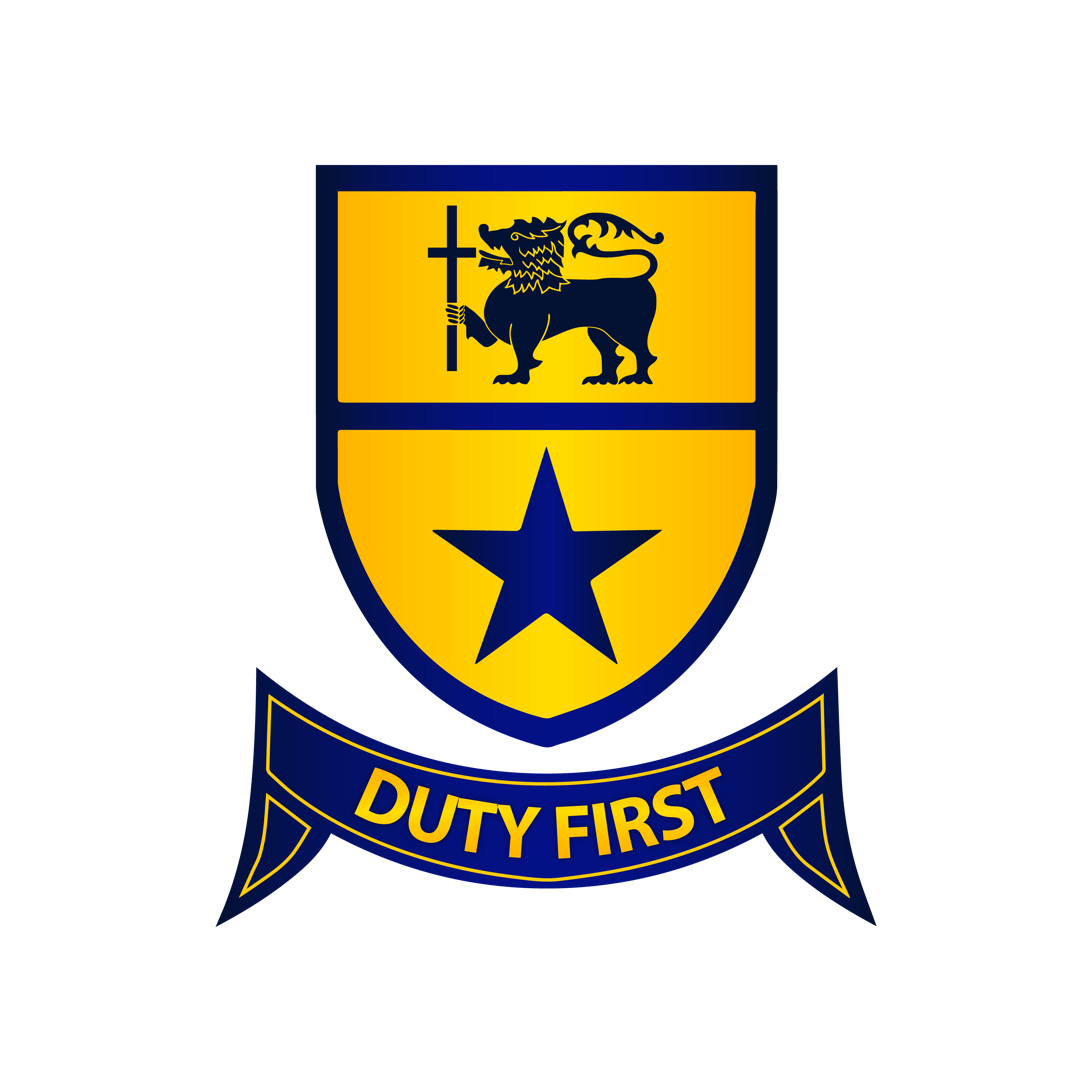
- College Crest

Location
- Wattala; Sri Lanka
- Coordinates: 6°59′8.02″N 79°53′34.91″E

Information
- Type: Government-aided National school
- Motto: Sinhala: පළමුව රාජකාරිය; Tamil: கடமை முதலில் (Duty First)
- Religious affiliation: Christianity
- Denomination: Roman Catholic
- Established: 4 May 1942; 83 years ago
- Founder: Vincent Joseph Gottwald
- Principal: F.S.wijayshingha
- Grades: 1 – 13
- Gender: Male
- Age: 5 to 19
- Area: 7.3 ha (18 acres)
- Houses: Vincent; Stephan; Callixtus; Austin
- Colors: Blue and Gold
- Alumni name: Anthonian
- Sister school: St. Anne's Balika Maha Vidyalaya, Wattala

St. Anthony's College, Wattala (Sinhala: ශා. අන්තෝනි විද්‍යාලය, වත්තල Tamil: சாந்த அந்தோனியார் வித்தியாலயம்) is a catholic boys' school in Wattala, Sri Lanka.

== History ==
On 5 April 1942, Colombo was subjected to aerial bombing by the Japanese military for about 90 minutes. Many residents fled, with one group who fled to the village of Wattala with the intention of not returning to the capital.

The influx highlighted the town's need for a school. A temporary cadjan shed was erected on a large property of about 7.3 hectares (18 acres), located on Averiwatta Road. On 4 May 1942, a permanent school opened, with Bro. Vincent Joseph as Director, assisted by four other brothers. This school was a branch of three schools: St. Benedict's College; St. Joseph's College; and De la Salle College.

The initial enrollment was 88 students. Most classes were housed in the shed, adjacent to the main building where the brothers lodged. Senior classes were held in the main house. The living conditions for the brothers were not comfortable absent electricity and running water. The Brothers had to draw water from a well to bathe and wash.

In addition to the three schools already mentioned, boys came from Royal, St. Joseph's College, Ananda College, De Mazenod College, and other outstation schools. Most of these boys returned to their respective schools when conditions improved in Colombo.

Most of the property was heavily vegetated and as the school population grew, the need for a playground increased. The students used the commercial service grounds near the Hunupitiya railway station, for games and physical activities. A sizable playground was constructed adjacent to the school within a year, where outdoor games like cricket, football, and volleyball were organised. 1942 concluded with a Parents' Day celebration. A temporary stage was put up at one end of the shed and each class contributed an item.

1943 several students returned to Colombo replaced by local boys. Absent facilities, the director of St. Benedict's College, Colombo allowed his laboratory to be used once a week for practical work in physics and chemistry. Ten students were presented for the first time for the SSC, which they all passed.

Bro. Vincent Joseph, the school's director started taking steps to make the school independent and not a branch school. With the help of organised meetings of parents and the chiefs of the various religious organisations, he petitioned for a new school. The Education Ministry bowed to public opinion allowing and the new school was officially established.

== Houses ==
The students are divided into four houses:

=== Vincent House ===
- Named after Vincent Joseph Gottwald, the founder and the first director of the college.
- Color : Purple

=== Stephen House ===
- Named after Stephen Harding, the second director of the college.
- Color : Green

=== Callixtus House ===
- Named after Anslem Callixtus, the third director of the college.
- Color : Red

=== Austin House ===
- Named after Austin Anthony, the fourth director of the college.
- Color : Pink

== Notable alumni ==
- Avishka Tharindu - Cricket Player (2010-2020)
- Manoj Hemaratne - First-class cricket player (1985–2000)
- Thisara Perera - International cricket player (2011–2012)
- Manjula Munasinghe - One Day International cricket player (1986–1991)
- Chaminda Vass - International cricket player (1987–1993)
- Malinda Lowe - record artist (1981)

== Past directors and principals ==
=== Directors ===
	Name	start	finish	notes
1.	Vincent Joseph Gottwald	4 May 1942	26 June 1950	founding director
2.	Stephen Harding	27 June 1950	31 August 1952	
3.	Vincent Joseph Gottwald	1 September 1952	31 December 1955	founding director (2nd term)
4.	Anslem Callixtus	1 January 1956	31 December 1958	
5.	Austin Anthony	1 January 1959	31 March 1963	
6.	Nicholas Joseph	1 April 1963	31 January 1964	
7.	Marcus Felix	1 February 1964	31 December 1965	
8.	Cassian of Jesus	1 January 1966	31 December 1970	
9.	Lewis of Jesus	1 January 1971	31 December 1974	
10.	Alexander Cyrillus	1 January 1975	31 July 1976	
11.	Augustine Brendan	1 August 1976	11 September 1979	
12.	Edwin Ambrose	12 September 1979	22 August 1981	
13.	Alexander Cyrillus	August 1981	December 1983	2nd term
14.	Eustace Bastian	1 January 1984	31 August 1986	
15.	George B. R. De Silva	1 September 1986	31 October 1998	

=== Principals ===
	Name	start	finish	notes
16.	Shirley V. Perera	March 1999	December 2002	
17.	E. T. Malcolm B. Perera	December 2002	February 2004	
18.	T. T. A. S. De Silva Thanapathy	February 2004	July 2007	
19.	Mal Fernando	July 2007	January 2023	
23.	Sarojani Weerasinghe			
