= Wimaladasa =

Wimaladasa is a surname. Notable people with the surname include:

- Tharindu Wimaladasa (born 1985), Sri Lankan cricketer
- Wickramesinghe Wimaladasa (born 1943), Sri Lankan sprinter
