= Antonians Sports Club =

First-class cricket team in Sri Lanka

Antonians Sports Club is a first-class cricket team in Sri Lanka. It played first-class cricket from 1992–93 to 2002–03, and again in 2010–11.

St. Anthony's College Ground, Wattala has been the club's home ground.

== List of players ==
Cricketer	Seasons
Jayantha Amerasinghe	
Gayan de Silva	
Pulasthi Gunaratne	
Mahesh Hemantha	
Manoj Hemaratne	1985–2000
Sarath Jayawardene	1995–97
Thusara Kodikara	1995–99
T. Magesh	1996–97
Pawuththuwadura Milton	
Tuan Miskin	
A. Perera	
Gamini Perera	
Gihan Premachandra	
A. Ranasinghe	
Malcolm Rodrigo	
Junaid Siddiqui	
Nilantha Tillakaratne	1999–2000
Pasan Wanasinghe	
Tharindu Wimaladasa	

== See also ==
- List of Sri Lankan cricket teams
