= St. John's College, Nugegoda =

- සාන්ත ජෝන් විද්‍යාලය
- Nugegoda; Sri Lanka

Information
- Type: National
- Motto: Latin: Nil Desperandum ("No Desperation")
- Established: 1915; 111 years ago
- Principal: S.Dilan Nishantha Gunarathne
- Grades: Class 1–13
- Gender: Boys
- Age: 6 to 19
- Enrollment: 5 000+
- Colours: Green and Black
- Song
- Affiliation: Church of Ceylon, Anglican.
- Website: stjohnscollege.lk

St. John's College, started in 1915 and is the only boys' school in Nugegoda, Sri Lanka. It contains two primary sections and upper school. Nugegoda had no English School until 1915. St. John's School commenced with 14 pupils on 5 May 1915. In 1934, the mixed school of St. John's was separated into separate Boys and Girls schools, with the boys school known as the College of St. John, Nugeogda.

== History ==
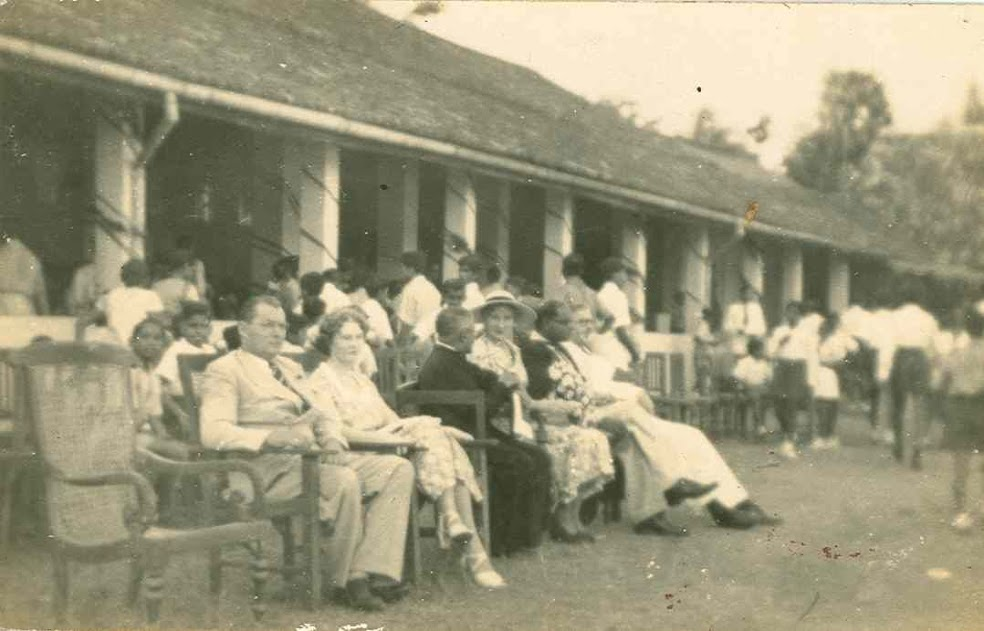
Historical image

In 1915, five Wardens of the Church of St. John, led by John Henry Wickramanayake, secured a piece of land in Nugegoda from the Anglican Bishop of Colombo. They collected money to establish an English School with fifteen students.

Initially it was a Christian Mission school and the first principal of the school was Wickramanayake. In 1934, the mixed school was separated into Girls' and Boys' schools. The girls' school was known as St. John's Girls' School and boys' school was known as St John's Boys' College. The schools were under the church of SS Mary and John, Nugegoda.

There was a Tamil stream as well but the classes were initially at the boys' school and then transferred to a building adjacent to the church. It became a separate school and was called Tamil Maha Vidyalaya. In 1963 under the government re-organisation of schools, all English medium classes were transferred to St Joseph's Convent.

== Past principals ==
- C. E. Rubasinghe (1934–1935)
- Rev. Clarence Pieris (1935–1937)
- J. H. Hill (1937–1939)
- Rev. Canon Harold De Mel (1940–1947)
- E. C. A. Navaratnaraja (1948–1957)
- W. T. Canegeratne (1957–1958)
- Samarawicrama (1958–1967)
- W. T. Bannaheka (1967–1969)
- C. K. Gamage (1970–1983)
- L. A. J. Jayasundara (1984–1994)
- R. A. R. Ranathunga (1994–1994)
- S. Kodikara (1994–1995)
- R. S. Jayasekara (1995–1996)
- S. Athulathmudali (1996–1998)
- Neville Kularatne (1998–1999)
- Asoka Senanayake (2000–2002)
- S. Dissanayake (2003–2006)
- K. Jayasekara (2007–2008)
- Maj. Liyangaskubura (2009–2012)
- Maj. Wanaguru (2012–2014)
- Maithreepala Liyanarachchi (2015–2017)
- Buddhika Aththanayake (2017–2023)
- S.Dilan Nishantha Gunarathne (2023–present)

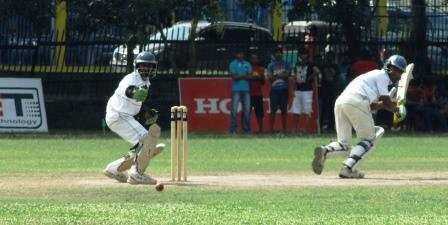

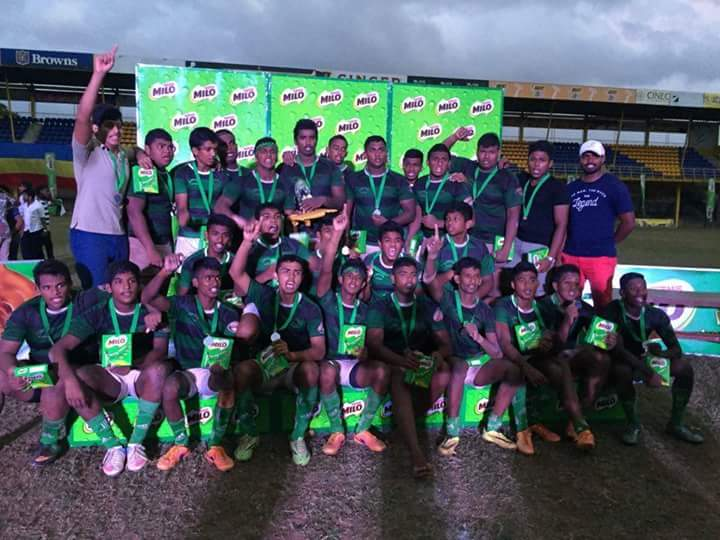
St. John's College Rugby Team

== Houses ==
- Copleston (Lihini) – Yellow –
- De Winton (Hansa) – Red –
- Carpenter Garnier (Kokila) – Green –
- Christopherson (Mayura) – Blue –

== Awards ==
=== Cyril Herath Memorial Trophy ===
The Cyril Herath Memorial trophy (Johnian of the Year) is awarded to the best overall student in the school. Cyril Herath served as the country's Inspector General of Police between 1985 and 1988. The Cyril Herath Memorial Trophy has only been awarded twice in the school's history, 2011 and 2015. In 2011 Udesh Chandima Perera won this award and Navodh Jayasundara won the Cyril Herath Memorial Trophy in 2015.

== Notable alumni ==
One of the first students, Ossie Abeyratne, became the first Dean of the Faculty of Medicine at the University of Colombo and another, Cyril Herath, the 22nd Inspector General of Police.

Name	Notability	Reference
Susil Premajayanth	Member of Parliament (Gampaha) (2000–2001), (Colombo) (2001–present)	
Ray Jayawardhana	Dean of Arts and Sciences (Cornell University)	
Cyril Herath	Inspector General of Police (1985–1988)	
Malini Fonseka	actress, Member of Parliament (National List) (2010–2015)	
Ajantha Ranasinghe	lyricist, author, poet, journalist (1940–2016)	
Sunil Ariyaratne	film director, author, poet	
Soma Edirisinghe	film director, author, businesswoman	
Anusha Samaranayake	first-class cricketer	
S. A. Dissanayake	Inspector General of Police (1963–1966)	
Cyril Dissanayake	Deputy Inspector General of Police (1958–1962)	
Lahiru Udara	Test cricketer	
