= Eranga Weeraratne =

Sri Lankan politician, engineer, and business executive

Hon. Eranga Weeraratne MP
- එරංග වීරරත්න எரங்க வீரரத்ன

National List Member of Parliament
- Incumbent
- Assumed office 21 November 2024
- President: Anura Kumara Dissanayake
- Prime Minister: Harini Amarasuriya

Member of Parliament for National People's Power

Personal details
- Born: 19 May 1974 (age 52)
- Party: National People's Power
- Spouse: Prabhashini Herath
- Children: 2
- Education: University of Moratuwa; Mahanama College; Mahinda College
- Occupation: Engineer, Business Executive

Eranga Udesh Weeraratne is a Sri Lankan politician, engineer, and business executive who was appointed as a National List Member of Parliament in 2024 under the National People's Power (NPP) government. Subsequently he was appointed as deputy minister of Digital Economy.

== Early life and education ==
Eranga is the eldest of three siblings. His sister, Chamindi, works in the real estate industry, and his brother, Suranga, serves as the Head of Finance and Administration at Omobio.

Weeraratne completed his primary education at Mahinda College and secondary education at Mahanama College. In 1990, he achieved 7 Distinctions and 1 Credit in the General Certificate of Education Ordinary Level (G.C.E. O/L) examination. Subsequently, in 1993, he obtained 2 A-grades and 2 B-grades in Physical Science at the General Certificate of Education Advanced Level (G.C.E. A/L).

In 2000, he graduated from the University of Moratuwa with a Bachelor's degree in Computer Science and Engineering.

== Career ==
After graduating with a degree in Computer Science and Engineering, Weeraratne joined Infotechs Limited as an e-Business engineer during the early growth of internet technologies. He spearheaded the development of *OmniBIS*, the first Sri Lankan portal offering comprehensive digital collaboration tools. These innovative services included free email, online calendar, instant messaging, file storage, and personal organization—predating similar platforms like Gmail and Dropbox. A distinctive feature of OmniBIS was its capability to send and receive emails via SMS.

Subsequently, he became a founding member of WaveNET, a software development company specializing in telecom-based products and services. Initially launched with just three members, WaveNET has since expanded to a robust team of over 120 professionals. Weeraratne served as the CTO at WaveNET from 2003 to 2010.

In 2012, he assumed dual roles as CEO and CTO of Omobio Pvt. Ltd.

From 2010 to 2013, he concurrently held the position of CTO at Telfinity Systems (Pvt) Ltd.

Beyond his role at Omobio, Weeraratne has diversified his professional portfolio by assuming leadership positions in various organisations:

- Chairman/Director at eimSky (Pvt) Ltd
- Director at Textware (Pvt) Ltd
- Chairman at Matrix Plantations
- Chairman/Director at Spiceyaya (Pvt) Ltd
- Chairman/Director at Spice Fortress (Pvt) Ltd
- Director at E-Lottery Solutions (Pvt) Ltd

== Political career ==
In 2019, Eranga entered active politics through the National Intellectuals Organisation (NIO), an organization of which he is a founding member. NIO is affiliated with the NPP party.

Weeraratne was appointed to the 17th Parliament of Sri Lanka as part of the NPP's National List in 2024. His selection reflects the party's emphasis on including experienced professionals and innovative leaders to guide policy and national development.

His appointment was received positively by the IT industry in Sri Lanka.

== Personal life ==
Eranga is married to Prabhashini Herath, and they have two children.

== Controversies ==
In 2012, social media posts and a gossip article alleged that Eranga Weeraratne was involved in a legal controversy regarding the theft of a laptop belonging to the late Professor Gihan Wikramanayake, then Director of the University of Colombo's Computer Studies Institute (UCSC). The claims also suggested that 74 CDs and DVDs, including content alleged to be pornographic, were recovered from Weeraratne's residence during a police investigation and that a case was filed in the Fort Magistrate's Court.

In December 2024, a detailed investigation by the fact-checking organization Fact Crescendo Sri Lanka concluded that these allegations were entirely fabricated. The findings revealed:

- No official records or mainstream media reports exist to substantiate the claims.
- The University of Colombo Computer Studies Institute confirmed that no such theft occurred, nor were any police complaints filed regarding the alleged incident.
- Dr. D.A.S. Athukorala, the current director of the institute, stated that neither Weeraratne nor the co-accused were staff members of the institute.
- The allegations appear to have originated from an old gossip article published in 2012, and no credible evidence supports them.

Fact Crescendo further suggested that the false narrative might have been a smear campaign by rival businesses in the software industry. The Digital Deputy Minister's office also denied the allegations, confirming that Weeraratne was not affiliated with the University of Colombo at the time.

== See also ==
- National People's Power
- Parliament of Sri Lanka
