= Jayantha Kularathna =

Sri Lankan admiral

- Allegiance: Sri Lanka
- Branch: Sri Lanka Navy
- Service years: 1987 – present
- Rank: Rear Admiral
- Commands: Chief of Staff; Deputy Chief of Staff; Commander, Eastern Naval Area; Commander, Northwestern Naval Area
- Awards: Rana Sura Padakkama; Uttama Seva Padakkama
- Education: Mahanama College

Jayantha Kularathna is a Sri Lankan admiral who is the incumbent Chief of Staff of the Sri Lanka Navy. Prior to this, he was the Commander, Eastern Naval Area.

== Early life and education ==
Kularathna completed his high school from Mahanama College and then joined the Sri Lanka Navy in 1987 as an Officer Cadet of the 16th intake, in the Executive branch.

== Career ==
KJ Kularatne assumed office as Commander Eastern Naval Area at the Command Headquarters in Trincomalee 8 March 2022. Before that, he served as Commander of Northwestern Naval Area. Prior to his promotion to the rank of Rear Admiral on 7 August 2020, Commodore Kularathna served as Deputy Area Commander at Eastern Naval Area. From Deputy chief of staff he promoted to Chief of staff on 18 December, 2022.
