= Tuan Miskin =

Sri Lankan cricketer (born 1968)

Personal information
- Born: 30 November 1968 (age 57)
- Source: Cricinfo, 10 February 2016

Tuan Miskin (born 30 November 1968) is a Sri Lankan former first-class cricketer who played for Antonians Sports Club and Kandy Youth Cricket Club.
