= Cyril Herath =

Sri Lankan Inspector-General of Police

Deshamanya Cyril Herath

22nd Inspector General of Police (Sri Lanka)
- In office December 1985 – August 1988
- Preceded by: Herbert Weerasinghe
- Succeeded by: Ernest Perera

Permanent Secretary Ministry of Defence
- In office 2003–2004
- Preceded by: Austin Fernando

Personal details
- Born: Anuradhapura
- Died: 8 September 2011
- Spouse: Ranee
- Children: Arjuna, Sanjaya, Dishan, Priyanthika
- Profession: Police officer

Deshamanya L. D. Cyril Herath was a Sri Lankan Inspector-General of Police and Permanent Secretary to the Ministry of Defence.

== Education ==
He was educated at St. John's College, Nugegoda and at the Royal College, Colombo and graduated from the University of Ceylon, Peradeniya with a BA in Economics, History and Philosophy, where he gained university colours in Athletics.

== Police career ==
Thereafter he joined the Ceylon Police Force as a probationary Assistant Superintendent of Police in 1957 and was promoted to Superintendent of Police (SP) in 1969. Herath was serving as SP Anuradhapura, when he was appointed Director of the Intelligence Services Division (ISD). The Police ISD was tasked with revamping intelligence gathering and internal security work following the 1971 JVP Insurrection. He established ISD headquarters at No.10 Cambridge Place and developed an effective staff and intelligence network. He was promoted to Deputy Inspector General of Police (DIG) in 1975. He served as the Inspector-General of Police from December 1985 to August 1988.

== Later work ==
Following his retirement from the police, he served as Chairman of the National Savings Bank from September 1994 to March 2002 before taking up appointment as Permanent Secretary of the Ministry of Defence from 2003 to 2004. In 2005, he was awarded the title Deshamanya by the President of Sri Lanka.

== Family ==
His son Arjuna is a partner of Ernst & Young (Sri Lanka).

== See also ==
- List of Sri Lankan non-career Permanent Secretaries

Police appointments
Preceded by Herbert Weerasinghe	Inspector General of Police; 1985–1988	Succeeded by Ernest Perera
