= Cyril Fernando =

Cyril Francis Fernando
- Born: 2 October 1895; Sri Lanka
- Died: 3 December 1974 (aged 79); Marawila, North Western Province, Sri Lanka
- Occupation: Physician

Cyril Francis Fernando CMG OBE MRCP (2 October 1895 – 3 December 1974) was a Sri Lankan clinician and researcher.

Fernando was educated by Sir Marcus Fernando (no relation) and Professor PB Fernando (no relation) at St. Benedict's College, Colombo. He attended University College Hospital, London, qualifying MBBS (1925) and obtaining MRCP in 1926 and M.D. in 1929 winning the gold medal for best performance.

He was appointed physician to out-patients at Colombo General Hospital and was an external faculty member and examiner in medicine in the Ceylon Medical College and later the Faculty of Medicine University of Ceylon .

He was honorary secretary and treasurer of the Ceylon Branch of the B.M.A (later renamed Sri Lanka Medical Association) 1930-32, a member of the council in 1933, 1934, and 1949, vice-president in 1942, and president in 1948-9. His son Dr Malik Fernando also served as the President of the Sri Lanka Medical Association. He was awarded O.B.E. in the 1949 New Year Honours and C.M.G. in 1955.

The Ceylon College of Physicians commemorates his memory with an award of a Gold Medal Oration delivered during its annual scientific sessions.
