= St. Joseph's College, Wattala =

St. Joseph's College, Wattala.
- College Crest

Location
- Enderamulla, Wattala; Sri Lanka; 6.924822°N 79.860405°E

Information
- Type: Semi Government
- Motto: Latin: In Scientia et Virtute (In Knowledge and Virtue)
- Religious affiliation: Christianity
- Denomination: Roman Catholic
- Established: 1996; 30 years ago
- Rector: Rev. Fr. Ruwan Deshapriya
- Staff: 95
- Grades: 1 – 13
- Gender: Male
- Age: 5 to 19
- Area: 7.3 ha (18 acres)
- Houses: Bonjean; Melizan; Courdet; Marque
- Colors: Blue and white
- Alumni name: Josephian
- Website: www.sjcwattala.lk

St. Joseph's College, Wattala also known as "St. Joseph's College Colombo 10 - Wattala Branch" was formerly known as St. Joseph's College, Enderamulla. It is a Catholic Semi-Government school situated in the suburbs of Colombo. It is a selective entry Catholic school commenced on 10 January 1996 under the guidance of Rev. Dr. Stanley Abeysekera. The College enrolls over 2,000 students with a staff of over 85.

The school is a non-fee levying school, whereby it receives some state funding, relying mostly on funds from an extensive network of alumni worldwide.

School buildings cover 7.3 hectares (18 acres) and include a College chapel, and auditorium.

== History ==
The college was the first branch school of St. Joseph's College, Colombo. The school opened on 10 January 1996 with sixty students. The first Rector was Stanley Abeysekera.

The school was constructed on land of 3.2 hectares (8 acres) donated by Esther Seneviratne on 17 January 1991, a member of the Catholic Parish of Enderamulla. She donated this land in memory of her husband Wilfred Seneviratne. On 28 August 1992, the President, Ranasinghe Premadasa, donated a 4.0 ha (10 acres) land to Nicholas Marcus Fernando. It was during this time that the Gomis and Fernando drew up a plan to put up the second branch school of the Archdiocese of Colombo within the aforementioned properties and in the vicinity of Enderamulla.

At first, in a temporary building, a nursery for the children of Enderamulla, Mabole, Wattala and Kelaniya was opened in 1995 by the Directress of the Nursery Section, Lourdes Marie. The first teacher in this nursery was Mariya Sarojini Coin. While the nursery was functioning, the construction work for the new school was begun with the financial support of the Catholic Businessmen and Professionals Association, affiliated to the Archdiocese.

The president of the Association was Joel Selvanayagam, who with the other members initiated this project to construct a branch school of St. Joseph's College. In a year's time, the first two-storey building with six classrooms was ready to start the school.

On 10 January 1996, the first academic year was started with 60 students from neighbouring areas including Wattala, Mabole, Ragama, Kelaniya and Weliveriya.

== Past Priests-in-Charge, Principals and Rectors ==
=== Priests-in-Charge ===
Rev. Fr. Sudath Gunetileke	1996–2000
Rev. Fr. Kennedy Perera	2000–2001
Rev. Fr. Sam Quintus Perera	2001–2003
Rev. Fr. Sudath Gunetileke	2003–2005

=== Principals ===
Rev. Fr. Anthony Fernandopulle	2006–2008
Rev. Fr. Ranjith Andradi	2008–2011

=== Rectors ===
Rev. Fr. Stanley Abeysekera	1996
Rev. Fr. Victor Silva	1996–2005
Rev. Fr. Sylvester Ranasinghe	2005–2011
Rev. Fr. Ranjith Andradi	2011–2014
Rev. Fr. Gemunu Dias	2014-2017
Rev. Fr. Prasad Niranjan Fernando	2017-2022
Rev. Fr. Sudham Perera	2022–2023
Rev.Fr. Sudath Gunetileke	2023–2024
Rev.Fr. Ruwan Deshapriya	2024–present

== College Identity ==
=== Flag ===
The official college flag consists of two navy blue stripes and a white stripe in the middle which are all equal in size. In some occasions, a flag with the college Crest placed in the middle is also used.

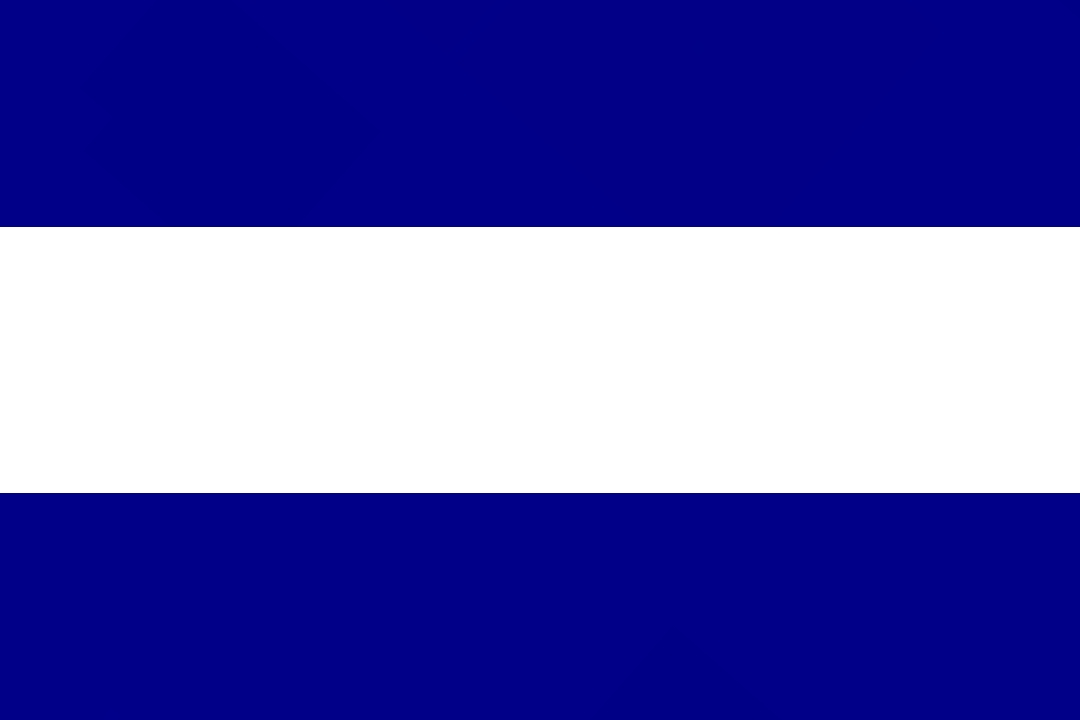
St. Joseph's College Flag

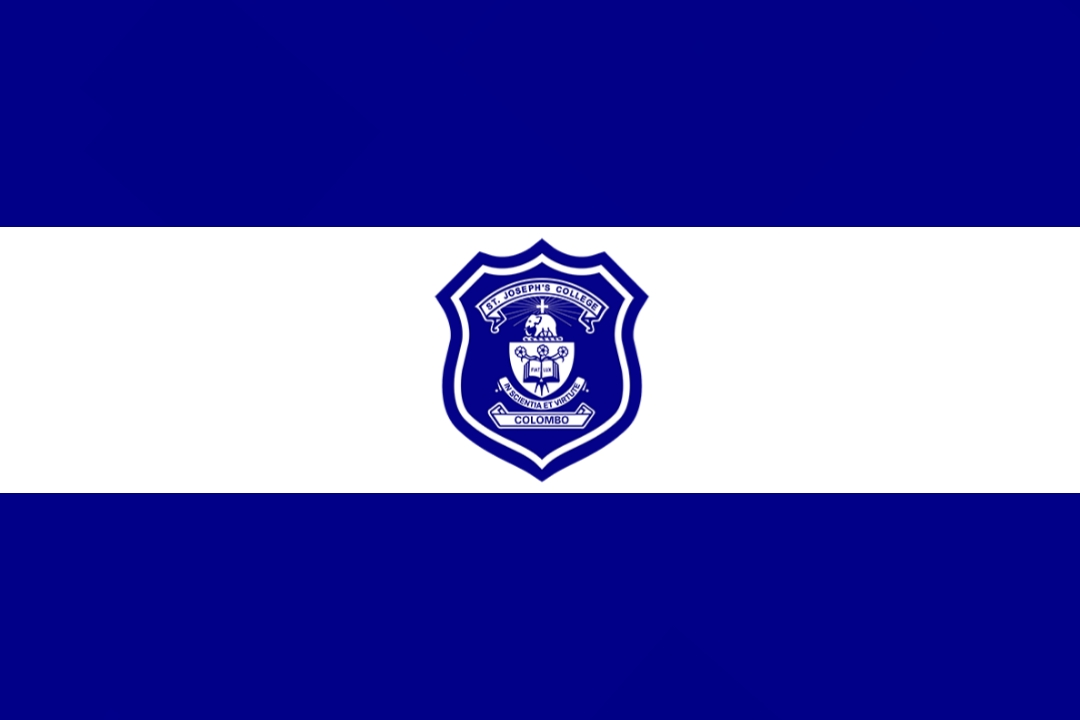
St. Joseph's College flag with the College crest

=== College Crest ===
The College Crest of St. Joseph’s College, Colombo 10, shared by all branches including St. Joseph’s College, Wattala, is the official emblem that represents the identity, values, and heritage of the Josephian family. It serves as a symbol of unity, discipline, and the Catholic tradition upheld by the college community. The meanings of the various symbols and elements featured in the crest are explained below.

- Cross on the elephant - The Catholic Sri Lankan Identity
- Three Lilies of St. Joseph - Faith, Hope & Charity(The Cardinal Values)
- The Open Book - Book of Wisdom and Knowledge
- The Inscription on the Book - “Fiat Lux” (Let there be light)
- College Motto - “In Scientia Et Virtue”(In Knowledge and in Virtue)

St. Joseph's College crest

=== College Anthem ===
The College Anthem of St. Joseph’s College, Colombo 10, commonly known as “White and Blue” and shared by all branches including St. Joseph’s College, Wattala, was written by Rev. Fr. John M. Lanigan OMI and composed by Mr. Edgar Neydoff. It consists of four stanzas, but traditionally only the first and last stanzas are sung during school occasions.

=== Houses ===
==== Bonjean House ====
- Named after Christophe Ernest Bonjean, first Archbishop of Colombo.
- Colour :

==== Melizan House ====
- Named after André-Théophile Mélizan, second Archbishop of Colombo.
- Colour :

==== Coudert House ====
- Named after Antoine Coudert, third Archbishop of Colombo.
- Colour :

==== Marque House ====
- Named after Pierre Guillame Marque, fourth Archbishop of Colombo.
- Colour :

== Sports ==
=== Basketball ===
(at top)

=== other ===
- Gymnastics
- chess

== Co-Curricular activities ==
=== Clubs and Societies ===
==== Science Union ====
The Science Union of St. Joseph’s College, Wattala is a student-led academic society established to promote interest and engagement in the field of science among students of the college. It serves as a platform that extends scientific learning beyond the classroom, encouraging inquiry, innovation, and the practical application of scientific knowledge.

The Union organizes a variety of academic activities, including science exhibitions, quizzes, lectures, workshops, and competitions. These initiatives are designed to strengthen students’ understanding of core scientific disciplines while fostering analytical thinking and intellectual curiosity.

In addition, the Science Union contributes to the development of leadership, teamwork, and organizational skills among its members. Through collaboration with teachers and external resource persons, it provides students with exposure to contemporary developments in science and technology, thereby nurturing a sustained interest in scientific study and research.

==== Sinhala Literary Union ====
The Sinhala Literary Union is a student society committed to the promotion and enrichment of Sinhala language and literature within the college community. It serves as a forum for students to engage with literary expression while deepening their understanding of Sinhala cultural and linguistic heritage.

Its activities include literary competitions, essay writing, poetry and prose recitations, debating events, and various cultural programmes conducted in Sinhala. These events are intended to refine students’ expressive abilities, encourage creative thought, and strengthen their appreciation of Sinhala literary traditions.

Beyond academic engagement, the Union also helps cultivate confidence in public speaking, organisational ability, and collaborative work among its members. By encouraging active participation in literary and cultural pursuits, it contributes to sustaining interest in Sinhala language studies and preserving its relevance within the school environment.

==== English Literary Union ====
The English Literary Union serves as a key academic and co-curricular body within the school, aimed at strengthening students’ proficiency and interest in the English language and its literary forms. It encourages students to engage actively with English literature while developing competence in both written and spoken communication.

The Union organizes a variety of academic and literary activities, including debates, public speaking events, essay competitions, quizzes, and literary sessions. It also functions through specialized sub-units such as the English Debate Club, which focuses on argumentation, critical thinking, and formal debating skills, and the Announcement Club, which trains students in clear articulation, public announcements, and confidence in spoken English during school events.

=== Prefects' Body ===
The Prefects’ Body of St. Joseph’s College, Wattala is the student leadership system entrusted with maintaining discipline, order, and the smooth functioning of school activities. It serves as a bridge between the academic staff, including the Rector and teachers, and the student body, ensuring effective communication and the implementation of school regulations. It operates through a structured hierarchy beginning with the Head Prefect, supported by two Deputy Head Prefects and Senior Prefects, who are selected from Grade 13.

Below them are the Junior Prefects, drawn from Grade 12, who assist in supervising student conduct and supporting school events. At the base level are the Senior and Junior Stewards, where Junior Stewards are from Grade 11, while Senior Stewards are students who have completed the G.C.E. Ordinary Level examination.

=== College Choir ===
The College Choir is a key musical ensemble that contributes significantly to the school’s liturgical and ceremonial life. Comprising students with an interest in vocal music, the choir plays an important role in enhancing school Masses, religious services, and official events through structured and harmonious choral performances.

Through its participation in liturgical celebrations, the choir adds depth, reverence, and solemn beauty to worship, helping to create a more meaningful and spiritually uplifting atmosphere. Its performances are designed not only to support the sacred nature of the liturgy but also to foster a sense of unity, reflection, and inner peace among those present.

In addition to its liturgical role, it has also represented the school in various inter-school and national-level competitions, often achieving notable success. These achievements reflect the discipline, dedication, and musical excellence of its members, while also contributing to the cultural identity and reputation of the college.
