= Manoj Hemaratne =

Sri Lankan cricketer (born 1969)

Manoj Veerendra Hemaratne (born July 24, 1969, in Colombo) is a Sri Lankan former first-class cricketer who played for the Antonians Sports Club from 1985 to 2000.

== Cricket career ==
He started his cricket career at St. Anthony's College, Wattala in 1979 and captained the school's under 13, 15, 17, and first eleven cricket teams. Under his captaincy, St. Anthony's College won the outstation best team BATA schoolboy cricketer awards in 1987. He also won the outstation best allrounder award and runner-up best fielder award. He scored more than 900 runs and captured more than 30 wickets in the 1985/86 and 1986/87 seasons. He was in the Sri Lankan under-19 cricket pool and his pool mates were Sanath Jayasuriya, and Romesh Kaluwitharana who played for the Sri Lankan national team.

He started his first-class career in 1985 and he played for Kurunegala SC, Saracens SC, and finally Antonian Sports Club Wattala. He played some useful innings for his clubs and scored a few centuries and fifties during his first-class career. Major tournaments participated in were the SARA trophy, Bristol trophy, Lakspray Trophy, and Premier League organized by the Sri Lanka cricket board. He was a member of the Gampaha District cricket team. He also participated in domestic one-day limited-over cricket Matches.

From 2001 to 2003 he was involved in cricket administration as a Cricket manager for Antonian SC and He is also an Antonian SC committee member.

He was involved in 2011 ICC World Cup and 2012 T20 World Cup which was held in Sri Lanka.

He was a liaison officer to the South Africa emerging team.
