= Inter-Provincial First Class Tournament =

- Countries: Sri Lanka
- Administrator: Sri Lanka Cricket
- Format: First-class
- First edition: 1990
- Latest edition: 2009–10
- Tournament format: Round-robin and knockout
- Number of teams: 5 (2009–10)
- Current champion: Basnahira North
- Most successful: Basnahira North, Western Province City (3 titles each)
- Website: Sri Lanka Cricket

Inter-Provincial First Class Tournament (usually referred to as simply the Inter-Provincial Cricket Tournament) was a domestic first-class cricket competition in Sri Lanka, held by Sri Lanka Cricket. It was a part of their Inter-Provincial Cricket program. From 2008 the Inter-Provincial First Class Tournament became the mainstream domestic first class competition in Sri Lanka, with the Premier Trophy being the other, which is played between the clubs in Sri Lanka. The tournament had begun in 1990 as Singer President's Trophy and was played continually for five years, until it was rebooted in 2003. Both Basnahira North and Western Province City, which is now merged into Basnahira North and South, have won the most tournaments, three each. The tournament hasn't been contested since 2010.

== Teams ==
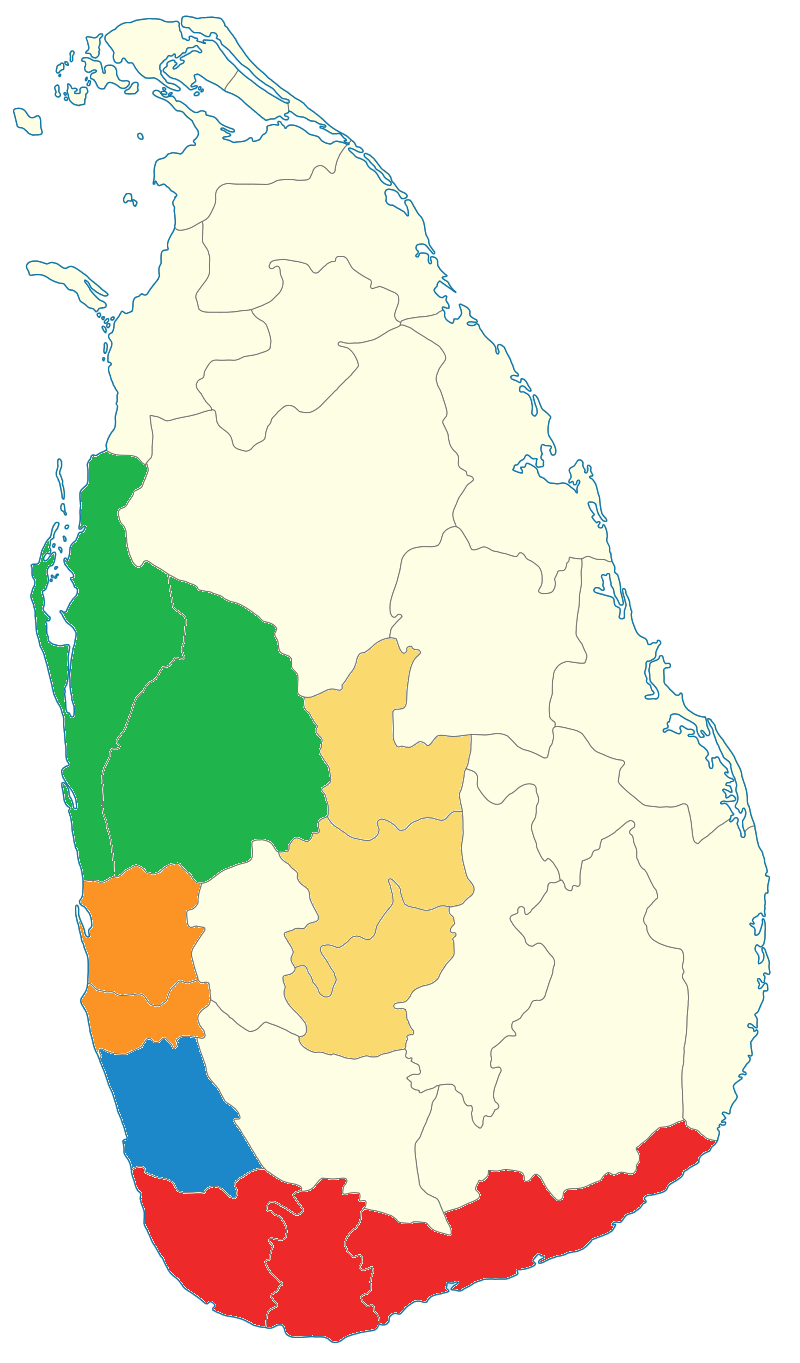
Inter-Provincial Twenty20 teams.

=== Current teams ===
Team name	Home ground	First season
Basnahira North; Western Province North	R. Premadasa Stadium	1992 as Western Province in 1990
Basnahira South; Western Province South	Sinhalese Sports Club Ground	1992 as Western Province in 1990
Kandurata; Central Province	Asgiriya Stadium	1990
Ruhuna; Southern Province	Galle International Stadium	1990
Wayamba; North Western Province	Welagedara Stadium	1990

=== Former Teams ===
Team name	Home ground	First season
Western Province; Western Province		1990
Western Province City; Western Province Cities		1990–91
Western Province Suburbs; Western Province Suburbs		1990–91
North Central Province; North Central Province		2003–04
Uva; Uva		2003–04

== Winners ==
Year	Final Venue	Man of the Series	Final		
Year	Final Venue	Man of the Series	Winner	Result	Runner-up
1990; Details	No Final Match	None awarded	Western Province; 29.1 points (3 matches)	Western Province first on points table	Central Province; 10.9 points (3 matches)
1990–91; Details	No Final Match	None awarded	Western Province City; 60.3 points (4 matches)	Western Province City first on points table	Western Province Suburbs; 34.8 points (4 matches)
1992; Details	No Final Match	None awarded	Western Province North; 48 points (5 matches)	Western Province North first on points table	Western Province South; 39 points (5 matches)
1993–94; Details	Uyanwatte Stadium	None awarded	Western Province City; 276 all out (90.5 overs); 344 all out (102 overs)	Western Province City won by 341 runs Scorecard	Western Province North; 153 all out (57 overs); 126 all out (41.4 overs)
1994–95; Details	Sinhalese Sports Club Ground	None awarded	Western Province City; 498 for 6, declared (132 overs)	Western Province City won by an innings and 53 runs Scorecard	Western Province South; 170 all out (70.4 overs); 266 all out (36.5 overs)
2003–04; Details	R Premadasa Stadium	None awarded	Central Province; 235 all out (64.1 overs); 258 all out (59.3 overs)	Central Province won by 176 runs Scorecard	North Central Province; 120 all out (38.1 overs); 197 all out (54.2 overs)
2004–05; Details	Rangiri Dambulla International Stadium	Tillakaratne Dilshan	Central Province; 202 all out (58.2 overs); 134 all out (43.4 overs)	North Central Province won by 60 runs Scorecard	North Central Province; 175 all out (55.4 overs); 221 all out (59.4 overs)
2008–09; Details	R Premadasa Stadium	None awarded	Basnahira North; 389 all out (104.2 overs); 16 for 0 (2 overs)	Basnahira North won by 10 wickets Scorecard	Wayamba; 223 all out (57 overs); 181 all out (57.2 overs)
2009–10; Details	Sinhalese Sports Club Ground	None awarded	Basnahira North	Match abandoned, Tournament shared Scorecard	Basnahira South
2017–18; Details	Mahinda Rajapaksa International Cricket Stadium		Team Galle	Team Galle won by number of points awarded Points table	Team Dambulla

=== Competition placings ===
Season	Winner	Runner-up	Third	Fourth	Fifth	Sixth
1990						
1990–91						
1992						
1993–94						
1994–95						
2003–04						
2004–05						
2008–09						
2009–10						

== See also ==
- Premier Trophy
