= Herbert Weerasinghe =

21st Inspector General of Police (Sri Lanka)
- In office April 1985 – December 1985
- Preceded by: Rudra Rajasingham
- Succeeded by: Cyril Herath

High Commissioner in Malaysia
- In office 1987–1991

Personal details
- Born: Herbert W. H. Weerasinghe
- Spouse: Delini
- Children: Nelani, Haritha, Ruani, Kshanika, Carini, Roshant
- Profession: Police officer, diplomat

Herbert W. H. Weerasinghe was the 21st Inspector General of the Sri Lanka Police (IGP) (April – December 1985).

Weerasinghe attended St. Benedict's College, Colombo. In 1979 he contested the position of President of the Football Federation of Sri Lanka, losing to Manilal Fernando by two votes.

In June 1983 Weerasinghe, the Senior Deputy Inspector-General of Police, was one of two senior Sri Lankan police officers who were invited by the British government to Belfast to "see at first hand the roles of the police and army in counter-terrorist operations". The visit was cut short following the anti-Tamil pogrom and riots in Sri Lanka during July. He was appointed Inspector General of the Sri Lanka Police by President J. R. Jayewardene on 20 April 1985. He retired from the Police Service in December 1985.

In 1987 he was appointed the country's High Commissioner in Malaysia, serving until 1991.

Weerasinghe was married to Delini, and they had six children: Nelani, Haritha, Ruani, Kshanika, Carini and Roshant.

== See also ==
- List of Sri Lankan non-career diplomats

Police appointments
Preceded by Rudra Rajasingham	Inspector General of Police; 1985	Succeeded by Cyril Herath
