= Naushad Samath =

Sri Lankan cricketer (born 1968)

Personal information
- Born: 2 August 1968 (age 58)
- Source: Cricinfo, 10 February 2016

Naushad Samath (born 2 August 1968) is a Sri Lankan former first-class cricketer who played for Kandy Youth Cricket Club.
