= Pathmanath Perera =

Sri Lankan cricketer (born 1972)

Personal information
- Born: 4 May 1972 (age 54); Kalutara, Sri Lanka
- Batting: Left-handed
- Bowling: Right arm medium-pace

Domestic team information
- Years: Team
- 1991-92: Kalutara Physical Culture Centre
- 1992-93: Antonians Sports Club
- 1993-94: Moratuwa Sports Club
- 1996-97: Kalutara Town Club
- 1997-98 to 1998-99: Panadura Sports Club
- 2005-06: Sebastianites Cricket and Athletic Club

Career statistics
Competition	FC	List A
Matches	44	7
Runs scored	1468	40
Batting average	19.31	8.00
100s/50s	2/7	0/0
Top score	133	24
Balls bowled	5197	228
Wickets	98	4
Bowling average	23.02	34.25
5 wickets in innings	6	0
10 wickets in match	0	n/a
Best bowling	7/46	1/17
Catches/stumpings	11/–	3/–
- Source: CricketArchive, 2 December 2016

Pathmanath Perera (born 4 May 1972) is a former Sri Lankan cricketer who played first-class and List A cricket from 1991 to 2005.

An all-rounder, Perera captained Kalutara Town Club in their initial first-class season in 1996–97. His highest first-class score was 133 for Kalutara against Sebastianites in 1996–97. His best first-class bowling figures were 7 for 46 for Antonians against Panadura in 1992–93.
