= Thusara Kodikara =

Sri Lankan cricketer (born 1969)

Personal information
- Full name: Thusara Prabath Kodikara
- Born: 17 November 1969 (age 56); Kandy, Sri Lanka
- Batting: Right-handed
- Bowling: Right-arm medium pace

Domestic team information
- Years: Team
- 1991–1999: Antonians Sports Club
- 1991–1994: Central Province
- FC debut: 21 March 1991 Central Province v Western Province Suburbs
- Last FC: 19 February 1999 Antonians Sports Club v Colts Cricket Club
- LA debut: 13 January 1993 Antonians Sports Club v Colts Cricket Club
- Last LA: 20 December 1998 Antonians Sports Club v Singha Sports Club

Career statistics
Competition	First-class	List A
Matches	55	5
Runs scored	2354	162
Batting average	27.37	32.40
100s/50s	4/9	0/0
Top score	236*	39
Balls bowled	3619	–
Wickets	60	4
Bowling average	32.68	9.50
5 wickets in innings	1	0
10 wickets in match	0	0
Best bowling	5/78	2/11
Catches/stumpings	23/–	0/–
- Source: CricketArchive, 6 January 2008

Thusara Prabath Kodikara (born 17 November 1969) is a former Sri Lankan international cricketer who represented the Malaysian national team between 2004 and 2009. He was born in Sri Lanka, and played for Vidyartha College Kandy and first-class cricket there in the 1990s before emigrating to Malaysia. Kodikara played as an all-rounder, batting right-handed and bowling right-arm medium pace.

== Playing career ==
=== Sri Lanka ===
Born in Kandy in 1969, Kodikara made his first-class debut for Central Province against Western Province Suburbs in March 1991. He played for a Central and North Western Combined XI against Pakistan A that August, and made his debut for Antonians Sports Club in a Saravanamuttu Trophy match against Kalutara Physical Culture Centre in October. In all, he played ten first-class matches that first year.

He played five first-class matches in 1992, including a match for a Sri Lanka Board President's XI. He made his List A debut in January 1993, playing for Antonians Sports Club against Colts Cricket Club, a month in which he scored 236 not out against Rio Sports Club, his highest first-class score.

He played his last match for Central Province in March 1994, and continued to be a regular member of the Antonians Sports Club side in first-class cricket over the next few years, rarely playing one-day cricket. He played his last first-class match in Sri Lanka in February 1999.

=== Malaysia ===
After finishing his first-class career in Sri Lanka, Kodikara moved to Malaysia. He first played for the Malaysian national side in February 2004, playing in the Stan Nagaiah Trophy series against Singapore. He played in the series again in 2005 and 2006, also playing in Dublin for the Dublin University Cricket Club in 2006.

He played for Malaysia in the 2006 ACC Trophy, also playing ACC Premier League matches against Hong Kong and Nepal that year. He also represented Malaysia at the 2007 and 2009 ACC Twenty20 Cups, and the 2009 ICC World Cricket League Division Six tournament.

== Coaching career ==
After retiring from playing, Kodikara remained involved in cricket as a coach. He has worked at the Bukit Jalil Sports School, and coached the Malaysia under-19s and the national women's team.
