= Malinda Lowe =

Sri Lankan audio mixer and engineer

- Born: Malinda Lowe; August 13, 1979 (age 45); Chilaw, Sri Lanka
- Education: St. Mary's College, Chilaw; St. Anthony's College, Wattala
- Occupations: Record producer; audio engineer; songwriter; event manager
- Children: 1
- Musical career
- Genres: Country; pop; R&B
- Instruments: Keyboards; piano
- Years active: 2002–present
- Labels: TuneStake
- Website: lk.linkedin.com/in/malinda-lowe-bb535738

Malinda Lowe (born 13 August 1979), is a Sri Lankan record producer, audio engineer, songwriter, and event manager particularly in Live Sound and mixing console. He is known for recording and mixing songs and synthesizers for artists such as Shreya Goshal, Udit Narayan, Olivia Newton-John, Mohombi, Akon, Sonu Nigam, Bathiya and Santhush and The Gypsies. He is also the creator and founder of Universal Sound Productions.

== Personal life ==
Lowe was born on 13 August 1979 in Chailaw, Sri Lanka. He started his education at St. Mary's College, Chilaw. Then he attended St. Anthony's College, Wattala to complete secondary education. He completed his O/Ls in 1996, and started mathematics for his A/Ls, which ended in three months. In school times, he studied keyboard and piano from Dulip Gabadamudalige.

== Career ==
Lowe spent time with his father helping with business-related matters while he was studying. In the meantime, he helped his father to run his hardware shop related to machinery and distribution. During his A/Ls, he joined with NIBM where he studied audio engineering. He studied audio engineering at Harman International Business School in California, and later followed a comprehensive course on Audio engineering endorsing Harman products. Then he completed digital mixing exams in Bangalore with Indian audio engineers. And joined with a few brands such as JBL USA, AVID USA, Soundcraft UK, Crown Audio, AKG, Waves, DanteAudio, and for Post mixing work Pro Tools.

In the early 2000s, he met renowned musician Nalin Perera, and they compiled a radio jingle in 2002. In 2006, Lowe entered the music industry by working as the sound engineer in the solo album Bambarindu for musician Nalin Perera. Later, he made collaborative work with Nalin Perera's musical band "Marians" during its first unplugged concert. The unplugged version was done for the 11th anniversary of Sirasa TV. At the same time, he met Ranga Dasanayake at Turning point studios where Lowe studied all the DAW and plugins. In 2009, he founded the sound production company titled "Universal Sound Productions", in which he was the director and Pro Audio live and post-production engineer. The company rigged a JBL VERTEC line array system at the 5,000-capacity Sri Lanka Exhibition and Convention Center for the musical show of R&B singer Ocean. Then the company supported two mega concerts in Sri Lanka by the UK/Australian singer Olivia Newton-John at the 1,800-capacity Musaeus College Auditorium in Colombo.

In 2018, Lowe got the opportunity to become the sound engineer for Sonu Nigam Live in Concert held at CH & FC, which was also his first international event. After that, Lowe continued to do many international events such as; Arjit Singh symphony orchestra, Yanni Live in concert, Colombo Musical festival, Jaxx festival, Shreya Goshal, Udit Narayan, Olivia Newton-John, Mohombi, Akon & Priyanka Chopra Concert in the Maldives, Leo Sayer, Billy Ocean, Abba Teens, Boney M., Jason Derulo, Kenny G, Engelbart Humperdinck, and Enrique Iglesias. In the meantime, he also made sound mixing for Sir Lionel Richie at the FOH and Jon Sacada. He was also involved as the sound mixer and engineer with many major events that took place in Sri Lanka such as the Commonwealth summit main event, the world Buddhist summit and Maldives 50th independence day celebration. Apart from that, he contributed to major local concert productions for leading musical bands and musicians such as Mahesh Denipitiya, Bathiya and Santhush Live concerts, Marians Unplugged, The Gypsies, Daddy: Chandrayan Pidu Live, Doctor and Rookantha Gunathilake's show Ru Sanda Re.

Apart from musical events, Lowe also worked as the sound mixer in sports events and modeling shows in Sri Lanka, such as; the Colombo Night Races, the Sri Lanka Premier League (SLPL) opening show, and Carlton Super Sevens Rugby. Currently, he is working as one of the member of the Audio Engineering Society in New York and also as a Harman technical presenter in Sri Lanka. He is also the managing director of Lowe Audio Solutions. In 2020, he was involved with Sri Lanka's first Drive-in Concert performed by Bathiya and Santhush.
