= Gihan Premachandra =

Sri Lankan cricketer (born 1980)

Gihan Premachandra (born May 30, 1980) was a Sri Lankan cricketer who played for Antonians. He was born in Colombo.

Premachandra made a single first-class appearance for the side, during the 1999–2000 Premier Championship. Batting in the tailend, he scored 2 not out in the first innings, and 4 in the second innings, as teammates Buddhika Ekanayake and Chandana Samarasinghe were recorded as being absent ill in the second innings.
