= Daminda Ranaweera =

Sri Lankan cricketer

Personal information
- Full name: Amunugama Gedara Ranaweera Mudiyanselage Daminda Kumara Ranaweera
- Born: 29 February 1980 (age 46); Kandy, Sri Lanka
- Height: 5 ft 7 in (1.70 m)
- Batting: Left-handed
- Bowling: Right-arm slow-medium
- Role: Wicket-keeper batsman

Domestic team information
- Years: Team
- 1999–2001: Kurunegala Youth Cricket Club
- 2001–2004: Colombo Cricket Club
- 2004–2006: Tamil Union C & AC
- 2006–2011: Colombo Cricket Club
- 2011–2013: Bloomfield C & AC
- 2015: Sarawak Cricket Club
- 2019–2021: Cambridge Cricket Club
- 2022: Seattle Thunderbolts

Career statistics
Competition	FC	LA	T20
Matches	104	61	8
Runs scored	4,101	982	108
Batting average	24.41	18.18	36.00
100s/50s	0/27	0/4	0/0
Top score	99	81	43
Catches/stumpings	207/26	55/20	5/3
- Source: Cricinfo, 17 August 2022

Amunugama Gedara Ranaweera Mudiyanselage Daminda Kumara Ranaweera, or commonly Daminda Ranaweera (born 29 February 1980) is a former Sri Lankan cricketer. He made his FC debut on 15 November 1999 for the Kurunegala Youth Cricket Club, against Colombo.

== Early life ==
Ranaweera was born on 29 February 1980 in Kandy, Sri Lanka. Ranaweera was raised into a Buddhist Sri Lankan family, and started playing cricket at an early age. He then started attending Vidyartha College at the age of 15 during the 1995/96 school year. Upon attending Vidyartha, Ranaweera played for his college's cricket team from 1997 to 1999.

== Career ==
=== Kurunegala (1999-2001) ===
Following Ranaweera's performances with Vidyartha in the 1998-99 Elephant Lemonade Cup, Ranaweera was selected to play for the Kurunegala Youth Cricket Club during the 1999-2000 Premier Trophy season. Ranaweera made his FC debut on 13 November 1999, against Colombo, wherein the match was drawn. He would go on to amass a total of 138 runs in 4 matches, with a high score of 71 during the trophy. Ranaweera was also selected by Kurunegala for the 1999-2000 Premier Limited Overs Tournament, where he made his LA debut on 26 February 2000, against the Nondescripts Cricket Club. He would go on to score 63 runs in 5 matches, with a high score of 50.
