= National Savings Bank (Sri Lanka) =

Sri Lankan specialized bank

- Company type: Government-owned corporation
- Industry: Finance
- Founded: 1972; 54 years ago
- Headquarters: "Saving House";255, Colombo, Sri Lanka.
- Number of locations: ▲261 branches
- Area served: Sri Lanka
- Key people: Dr. Harsha Cabral (Chairperson)
- Products: Banking, financial and related services
- Revenue: ▲ Rs 127.547 billion (2020)
- Operating income: ▲ Rs 15.645 billion (2019)
- Net income: ▲ Rs 10.108 billion (2020)
- Total assets: ▲ Rs 1,363.808 billion (2020)
- Total equity: ▲ Rs 51.897 billion (2020)
- Number of employees: ▼4,641 (2020)
- Website: www.nsb.lk

National Savings Bank (NSB) is a state-owned Savings Bank in Sri Lanka. It was incorporated in Ceylon by the National Savings Bank Act No. 30 of 1971 and was granted the status of the Licensed Specialised Bank in terms of the Banking Act No. 30 of 1988. NSB has 262 branches. It also carries out postal banking with the cooperation of 643 post offices and 3,412 sub-post offices of the Sri Lanka Post. The current Chairperson of the NSB is Dr. Harsha Cabral

== Past Chairmen ==
Since 1971, the following were Chairmen of the Bank (list incomplete):

- Harindranath George Dias
- M. J. Silva
- Muttusamy Sanmuganathan
- D.M Swaminathan
- Cyril Herath
- Upali Gunaratne
- S. R. Attygalle
- Pradeep Kariyawasam
- Aswin De Silva
- R.M.P. Rathnayake
- Jayaraja Chandrasekera
- Keasila Jayawardena
- Dr. Harsha Cabral, PC

== See also ==
- List of banks
