= Pasan Wanasinghe =

Sri Lankan cricketer (born 1970)

Wasala Mudiyanselage Pasan Nirmitha Wanasinghe (born September 30, 1970 Colombo, Sri Lanka) is a Sri Lankan first class cricketer. An all-rounder, he is a right arm fast-medium bowler and is right-handed top order batsman, usually coming in at 3. Wanasinghe has previously represented Sri Lanka A.
