= Lalithamana Fernando =

Sri Lankan cricketer (born 1962)

Personal information
- Full name: Thewarathantrige Lalithamana Fernando
- Born: 27 December 1962 (age 63); Sri Lanka
- Batting: Right-handed
- Bowling: Right-arm medium

International information
- National side: Sri Lanka
- Only ODI (cap 57): 25 October 1989 v Australia

Career statistics
Competition	ODI
Matches	1
Runs scored	8
Batting average	8.00
100s/50s	0/0
Top score	8
Balls bowled	18
Wickets	1
Bowling average	16.00
5 wickets in innings	0
10 wickets in match	0
Best bowling	1/16
Catches/stumpings	0/–
- Source: Cricinfo, 13 March 2017

Thewarathantrige Lalithamana Fernando (born 27 December 1962) is a former Sri Lankan cricketer who played in one One Day International in 1989.He completed his education at Mahanama College.
