= Trishane Nonis =

Sri Lankan cricketer and coach (born 1968)

Personal information
- Born: 28 September 1968 (age 58); Colombo, Sri Lanka

Head coaching information
- Years: Team
- 2021–present: Bhutan
- Source: Cricinfo, 11 February 2016

Anton Trishane Nonis (born 28 September 1968) is a Sri Lankan cricket coach and former player.

== Playing career ==
Nonis played eight matches of first-class cricket for Moors Sports Club and Central Province

== Coaching career ==
Nonis coached Air Force Sports Club, Tamil Union Cricket and Athletic Club, and Navy Sports Club in Sri Lankan first class domestic cricket, as well as De Mazenod College and St. Benedicts College In 2013 he coached the Qatar national under-19 cricket team.

In September 2021, Nonis was appointed head coach of the Bhutan national cricket team. His first tournament in charge was the 2022 Malaysia Quadrangular Series.
