= Hasan Rushdy =

Sri Lankan cricketer (born 1971)

Personal information
- Born: 10 August 1971 (age 55); Hatton, Sri Lanka
- Source: Cricinfo, 11 February 2016

Hasan Rushdy (born 10 August 1971) is a Sri Lankan former first-class cricketer who played for Tamil Union Cricket and Athletic Club.
