= Nilantha Tillakaratne =

Sri Lankan cricketer (born 1977)

Nilantha Tillakaratne (born March 16, 1977) was a Sri Lankan cricketer. He was a right-handed batsman and a right-arm medium-pace bowler. He was born in Colombo.

Tillakaratne began his career with Kalutara Town Club, making twelve appearances for the team during the 1996-97 Saravanamuttu Trophy campaign, Kalutara's only season in first-class cricket. Featuring in the upper-middle order, Tillakaratne played twelve of the team's thirteen matches in the competition, none of which ended in victory.

Tillakaratne's first-class best score, an innings of 78 against Panadura, was one of the four half-centuries that Tillakaratne made during his career.

After two seasons out of the first-class game, Tillakaratne returned to play for Antonians in the 1999–2000 season, for whom he played four matches in the Premier Championship campaign, though once again he struggled to bat from the opening order.
