= Kanchana Gunawardene =

Sri Lankan cricketer (born 1984)

Personal information
- Born: 9 October 1984 (age 42); Colombo, Sri Lanka
- Source: Cricinfo, 30 January 2016

Kanchana Gunawardene (born 9 October 1984) is a Sri Lankan first-class cricketer who played for Colts Cricket Club. He made his Twenty20 debut on 17 August 2004, for Nondescripts Cricket Club in the 2004 SLC Twenty20 Tournament.

== See also ==
- List of Chilaw Marians Cricket Club players
