= Vajira Silva =

Sri Lankan cricketer (born 1966)

Personal information
- Born: 5 December 1966 (age 59); Colombo, Sri Lanka
- Source: Cricinfo, 10 February 2016

Vajira Silva (born 5 December 1966) is a Sri Lankan former first-class cricketer who played for Kandy Cricket Club.
