= Tharindu Wimaladasa =

Sri Lankan cricketer (born 1985)

Andra Hannadige Tharindu Harshana Wimaladasa (commonly known as Tharindu Wimaladasa; born August 24, 1985) was a Sri Lankan cricketer. He was a left-handed batsman and a leg-break bowler who played for Antonians. He was born in Ragama.

Wimaladasa made a single first-class appearance, during the 2002-03 Premier Championship. Batting in the upper middle order, he scored 13 runs in the first innings in which he batted and 1 run in the second.
