= Suresh Niroshan =

Sri Lankan cricketer (born 1985)

Personal information
- Born: 29 November 1985 (age 40)
- Source: Cricinfo, 4 December 2017

Suresh Niroshan (born 29 November 1985) is a Sri Lankan cricketer. He played 65 first-class and 47 List A matches for multiple domestic sides in Sri Lanka between 2004 and 2017. He made his first-class debut for Chilaw Marians Cricket Club in the 2004–05 Premier Trophy on 1 October 2004.

== See also ==
- List of Chilaw Marians Cricket Club players
