= Gayan de Silva (Sri Lankan cricketer, born 1988) =

Sri Lankan cricketer

Personal information
- Full name: Yakupiti Gayan Asanka de Silva
- Born: 12 January 1988 (age 38); Balapitiya, Sri Lanka
- Batting: Right-handed
- Role: Batsman

Domestic team information
- Years: Team
- 2009: Colombo Cricket Club
- 2010–2011: Antonians Sports Club
- 2012: Nondescripts Cricket Club
- 2012–2013: Badureliya Sports Club

Career statistics
Competition	FC	LA
Matches	11	10
Runs scored	450	31
Batting average	23.68	3.44
100s/50s	0/3	0/0
Top score	97	13
Catches/stumpings	8/–	3/–
- Source: ESPN Cricinfo, 16 July 2020

Yakupiti Gayan Asanka de Silva (born 12 January 1988), known as Gayan de Silva, is a Sri Lankan cricketer. He made his senior competitive debut during the 2008–09 season, playing for the Colombo Cricket Club, and has since spent seasons with Antonians, Nondescripts, and Badureliya Sports Club.

Born in Balapitiya, Southern Province, de Silva attended Royal College, Colombo, and played for the school team in both the 2004 and 2005 editions of the annual Royal–Thomian match. He made his debut in the Under-23 Tournament for Colombo Cricket Club in mid-2004, when he was only 15 years old. de Silva made his senior debut for Colombo in early January 2009, during the 2008–09 season of the Premier Limited Overs Tournament, and played several more one-day games the following season. His first-class debut came during the 2010–11 season of the Premier Trophy, by which time he had switched to Antonians. Playing as an opening batsman, de Silva scored a maiden half-century, 68, against Seeduwa Raddoluwa in his second match of the season, which he followed with an innings of 97 against Burgher Recreation Club two games later. The latter innings came from a team total of 172 and took only 104 balls, with de Silva (as the last man out) narrowly missing out on carrying his bat. de Silva has since scored only one further half-century, for Badureliya against Colombo C.C. during the 2012–13 season, having earlier spent the 2011–12 season with Nondescripts.
