= St. Benedict's College, Colombo =

St. Benedict's College

Location
- St.Benedicts Mawatha (former Walls Street), Kotahena, Colombo; Sri Lanka; 6°56′55.19″N 79°51′52.34″E

Information
- Type: Semi Government
- Motto: Religio, Mores, Cultura (Religion, Morals, Culture)
- Religious affiliation: Roman Catholic
- Established: 1865; 161 years ago (founded in 1838 as Kottanchina Seminary)
- Principal: Niran Perera
- Staff: 250
- Grades: 1–13
- Gender: Boys
- Age: 6 to 19
- Enrollment: 3700
- Education system: National Education System Edexel
- Houses: Luke; Camillus; Cassian; Claude
- Colors: Green and White
- Nickname: Bens
- Alumni name: Benedictines
- Website: stbenedictscollege.lk

St. Benedict's College (Sinhala: සාන්ත බෙනඩික් විදුහල, Tamil: புனித ஆசீர்வாதப்பர் கல்லூரி) is a Catholic school located in the Kotahena area of Colombo, Sri Lanka.

== History ==
The school was founded in 1838 by the Diocese of Ceylon as Kottanchina Seminary. St. Benedict's College, the oldest Roman Catholic school in Sri Lanka, was inaugurated in 1865 by Silvestro Benedictine monks. The school consisted of a few classrooms and small staff at first.

In 1868, the De La Salle Brothers assumed administration of the college. They renamed it to St. Benedict's College.Since then, the school has been administered by many brothers who belong to the La Sallian Community.

The past Directors of the college include Austin Anthony, Glastian Oliver, Alban Patrick, Athanace Charles, Osmund Gregory, Alexander Cyrilus, Granville Perera and Anselm Calixtus.

== Administration ==
As of 2026 the college is led by Rev. Bro Niran Perera, and taught approximately 3,700 students with a staff of over 250 teachers. Students range from Grade 1 to Grade 13 (see Education in Sri Lanka), studying in English, Sinhala and Tamil.

== Campus ==
The premises are adjacent to St. Lucia's Cathedral which is known as the chapel of St. Benedict's College. The Main Building, the Reverend Brothers Luke, Alexander, and James Memorial Buildings, the Reverend Brother Granville Perera Aquatic Centre, The Main Hall Building, and Longstanding Clock Tower (built during the English Colonial Era) complete the college. Academic facilities are provided throughout the college in combination with co-curricular and extra-curricular facilities.

The college prefects' board consists of fifty students who are selected for their all-around performance and contributions towards the college. The prefects make themselves available for many activities such as special events, occasions, general assemblies, and day-to-day discipline.

The college section consists of the main hall, buildings named after reverend brothers James, Alexander and Luke, a library, three computer laboratories, a lecture hall, physics, biology, and chemistry laboratories, three music and art rooms, and a language centre.

=== Primary ===
The primary is physically separated from the college section headed by Praveen Vaaz. The sixty member staff provides education to around 1,000 students in fields of the academy, sports arts, and music.

The primary section consists of two main buildings with up to forty classes, a library, language unit, computer laboratory, music hall, basketball court and arts room. The primary prefects board consists of twenty prefects who attend all school occasions and discipline the younger students. Additionally, the primary students are given opportunities to participate in scouting, choir and sports.

== Sports ==
Since opening in 1865, St, Benedict's has actively participated in island sports; especially football, basketball, hockey and cricket and have been National Champions for all four of these sports. The college had the All-Island Champion Cricket team in 1964/65, It became All-Island Athletic Champion in 2008, All-Island Football Champion in1960s (Several Championship Awards), 1970s (Several Championship Awards), 1980s (Several Championship Awards), 2006, 2007, and 2008, All-Island Basketball Champion in1960s, 1970s, 1980s, most probably almost 70% of schools tournament won during 60s,70s and 80s, 2006 and 2009, All-Island Hockey Champion in 2007.

The College owns a Gymnasium and a Sports-Hostel. The Playground on Bloumendhal Road consist of Cricket pitches and turf, Rugby fields, Football fields, Hockey facilities, and provides facilities for other various athletics.

Within college premises, the college has two basketball courts; one of which is lit for night games. A swimming pool with viewing facilities was added in 2010.

St. Benedict's Primary is the first primary section of a school in the country to have its own basketball court. It offers table tennis in addition to the main sports of cricket, tennis, and swimming.

== Old Boys ==
The Old Boys of St. Benedict's College, An organization of former students, have played a role in the affairs and ventures of the college since 1904. The Loyal Old Bens have been instrumental in projects, functions and special events.

== Notable alumni ==
Refer Category: Alumni of St. Benedict's College, Colombo

Name	Notability	Reference
Lasantha Rodrigo	25th Commander of the Sri Lanka Army	
Narada Maha Thera	Buddhist monk, scholar, writer, translator	
Anagarika Dharmapala	Buddhist revivalist, writer	
Maheesh Theekshana	Sri Lankan cricketer	
Ranjit Fernando	Sri Lankan cricketer	
Sunil Santha	composer, singer, lyricist	
Stanley Tillekeratne	former Speaker of the Sri Lankan Parliament	
Ravindra Randeniya	actor, former politician	
Alfred Thambiayah	businessman, centenarian, politician	
Robin Fernando	actor, stunt coordinator	
Ernest Perera	Inspector General of Sri Lanka Police	
Marcus Fernando	member of the Executive Council of Ceylon and Legislative Council of Ceylon	
Herbert Weerasinghe	Inspector General of Police	
Cyril Fernando	physician, medical researcher	
Vijaya Kumaranatunga	actor, singer, politician (founder Sri Lanka Mahajana Pakshaya)	
