= Kandy Youth Cricket Club =

Personnel
- Chief executive: Anton Perera

Team information
- Founded: 1987

Kandy Youth Cricket Club was a first class cricket team in Sri Lanka which competed in the Premier Trophy.

== See also ==
- List of Sri Lankan cricket teams
