= Rio Sports Club =

Sei Lankan cricket team

Rio Sports Club is a former first-class cricket team in Sri Lanka.

Rio competed in the Sri Lankan first-class competition in 1992-93 and 2001–02. They played 14 matches and lost all of them.

They continue to compete at sub-first-class levels.

== See also ==
- List of Sri Lankan cricket teams
