= Pushpakumara Serasinghe =

Sri Lankan cricketer (born 1963)

Personal information
- Born: 8 April 1963 (age 63); Colombo, Sri Lanka
- Source: Cricinfo, 11 February 2016

Pushpakumara Serasinghe (born 8 April 1963) is a Sri Lankan former first-class cricketer who played for Police Sports Club.
