= Western Province Suburbs cricket team =

Sri-Lankan cricket team

Personnel
- Captain: Roy Dias

Team information
- Founded: 1991

History
- Inter-Provincial First Class Tournament wins: None

Western Province Suburbs cricket team was a Sri Lankan First-class cricket team. The team was established in 1991 and featured only in the Inter-Provincial First Class Tournament.

== Players ==
=== Notable players ===
- Roy Dias

== Honours ==
=== Domestic ===
==== First Class ====
- Inter-Provincial First Class Tournament: 0
