= Western Province City cricket team =

Cricket team in Sri Lanka

Personnel
- Captain: Roy Dias

Team information
- Founded: 1991

History
- Inter-Provincial First Class Tournament wins: 3 (1990–91, 1993–94, 1994–95)

Western Province City cricket team was a Sri Lankan First-class cricket team. The team was established in 1991 and featured only in the Inter-Provincial First Class Tournament. The team won three championships.

== Players ==
=== Notable players ===
- Roy Dias

== Honours ==
=== Domestic ===
==== First Class ====
- Inter-Provincial First Class Tournament: 3

1990–91
1993–94
1994–95
