= Singha Sports Club =

Singha Sports Club is a former first-class cricket team in Sri Lanka. The team played first-class cricket in most seasons from 1989–90 to 2010–11. It played 155 matches, for 22 wins, 70 losses and 63 draws. It continues to compete in sub-first-class competitions.

== See also ==
- List of Sri Lankan cricket teams
