= Dalugama =

Dalugama දළුගම தளுகம
- Suburb
- Location within Sri Lanka
- Coordinates: 6°58′0″N 79°54′0″E
- Country: Sri Lanka
- Province: Western Province
- District: Colombo District

Population (2010)
  - Total: 74,428
- 2010 Department of Census and Statistics estimate
- Time zone: UTC+5:30 (Sri Lanka Standard Time Zone)
- Postal Code: 11300

Dalugama is a suburb of Colombo city, situated North-East of the Colombo city centre fort, the capital of Sri Lanka. It is a fast developing administrative, commercial and residential area in the Colombo District. According to the 2010 Department of Census and Statistics estimate, it is a populous suburb of Colombo city, with an average population of 74,428.

== See also ==
- List of towns in Western Province, Sri Lanka
