= Wattala =

Wattala වත්තල வத்தளை
- Suburb
- Location in Sri Lanka
- Coordinates: 6°59′N 79°53′E
- Country: Sri Lanka
- Province: Western Province
- District: Gampaha District

Government
  - Type: Urban Council
- Elevation: 1 m (3.3 ft)

Population (2011)
  - Total: 174,336
- Time zone: UTC+05:30 (SLST)
- Postal code: 11300

Wattala (Sinhala: වත්තල, Tamil: வத்தளை) is a large suburb in Gampaha, Western Province, Sri Lanka. It is situated around 9 km (5.6 mi) northeast of Colombo, on the A3 highway between Colombo and Negombo.

People from all walks of life live in this area. The traditional fisher folk, large sections of the working class, many types of white collar workers, a fair number of professionals and even some richer folk live here. Churches, Buddhist temples, Hindu temples, mosques, schools of various grades and many private dispensaries are spread throughout the area. Though it is a majority Roman Catholic area, people of many faiths live here in peaceful coexistence. A sizable population also exists of minority Tamils and a smaller percentage of Muslims. There has been no record of any violence used by one faith group or racial group against another.

Religious composition in Wattala DS Division according to 2012 census data is as follows Roman Catholics 79,334-45.20%, Buddhists 52,405-29.86%, Hindus 22,782-12.98%, Muslims 11,407-6.50%, Other Christians 9,453-5.39%, Others 144-0.08%.

This area also produces many migrant workers. Almost all families produce one or more persons who go abroad for employment. The migrant workers also bring back income and therefore have an influence in creating new trends in the society.

Wattala has become a popular area for living and buying property and has recently become the 3rd most popular city for house searches, according to property website LankaPropertyWeb.com

== Schools ==
- St. Anne's Balika Maha Vidyalaya, Wattala
- St. Anthony's College, Wattala
- Christ King College, Hekitta
- C.P.M Faith School
- St. Joseph's College, Wattala
