= Kirimetiyagara =

Coordinates: 7°0′N 79°56′E

Kirimetiyagara (also written as Kirimatiyagara) is a small village situated in the western part of Sri Lanka. The distance to Colombo, the commercial capital of Sri Lanka, is about 10 miles from Kirimetiyagara. The closest city to Kirimetiyagara is Kadawatha, which is on the Kandy Road. St Anthony's Catholic church is the main attraction in Kirimetiyagara.
