= 2009–10 Inter-Provincial Limited Over Tournament =

- Administrator: Sri Lanka Cricket
- Cricket format: Limited overs cricket
- Tournament format(s): Round-robin and Knockout
- Host: Sri Lanka
- Champions: Kandurata elevens (2nd title)
- Participants: 6
- Matches: 18
- Player of the series: Kaushalya Weeraratne
- Most runs: Kaushalya Weeraratne 371 (411 balls)
- Most wickets: Sachithra Senanayake 14 (57.1 overs)
- Official website: Cricinfo site

The 2009–10 Inter-Provincial Limited Over Tournament was the second season of the official Limited overs domestic cricket competition in Sri Lanka. Six teams in total, five representing four provinces of Sri Lanka and a Sri Lanka Cricket team participating in the competition. The competition began on 6 February 2010 when Ruhuna elevens played the Sri Lanka Cricket Combined XI at Galle International Stadium, in Galle.

This season comprised 15 regular matches, two semi finals and a grand final.

== Teams ==
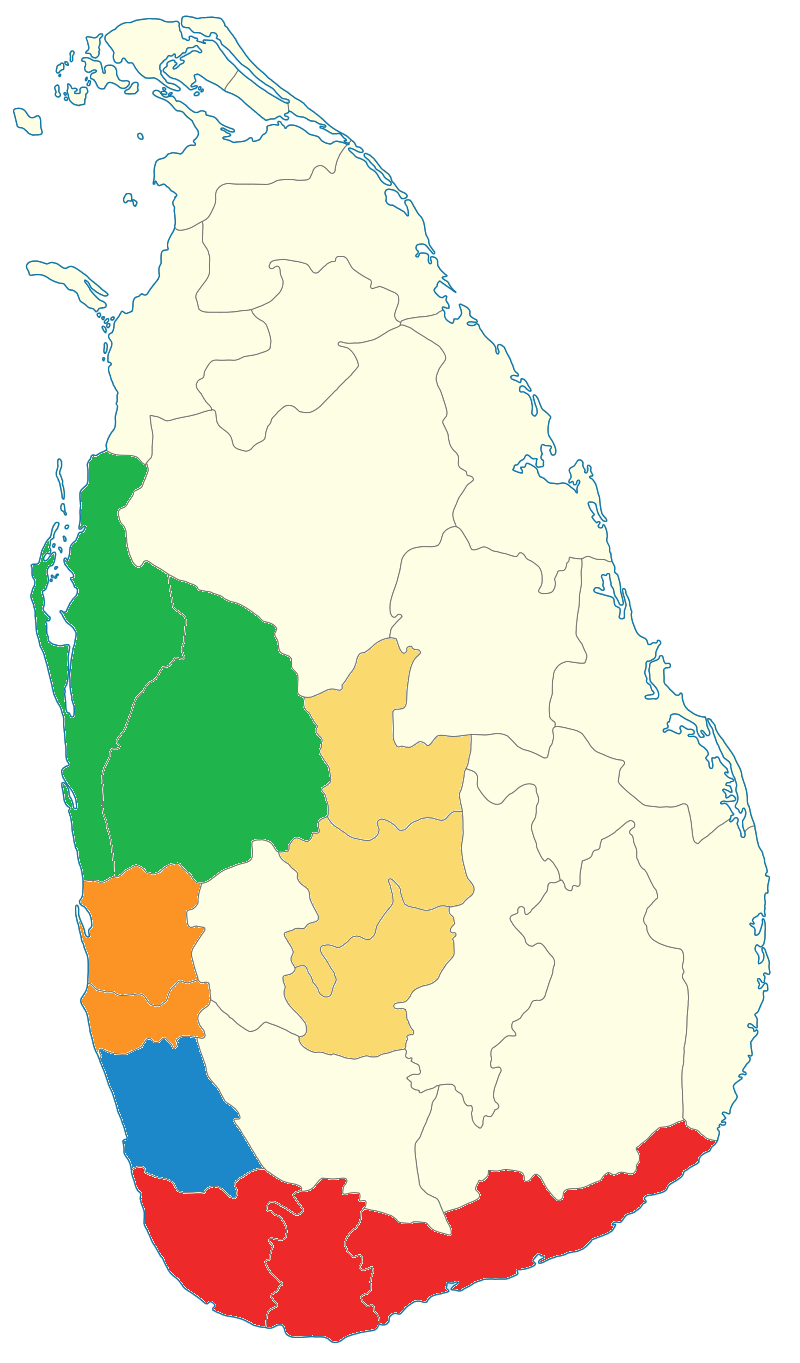
Inter-Provincial Twenty20 teams.

Team name (Sponsored name)	Home ground(s)	Captain
Basnahira North elevens Western Province North		
Basnahira South elevens Western Province South		
Kandurata elevens Central Province	Pallekele International Cricket Stadium	Kumar Sangakkara
Ruhuna elevens Southern Province	Galle International Stadium	Sanath Jayasuriya
Sri Lanka Cricket Combined XI; Sri Lanka Cricket		
Wayamba elevens North Western Province	Welagedara Stadium	Jehan Mubarak

== Stadiums ==
Moratuwa	Galle	Colombo	Colombo
Tyronne Fernando Stadium	Galle International Stadium	Colts Cricket Club Ground	Nondescripts Cricket Club Ground
Capacity: 15,000	Capacity: ?	Capacity: ?	Capacity: 2,00
	2009–10 Inter-Provincial Limited Over Tournament is located in Sri Lanka		Kurunegala
	2009–10 Inter-Provincial Limited Over Tournament is located in Sri Lanka		Welagedara Stadium
	2009–10 Inter-Provincial Limited Over Tournament is located in Sri Lanka		Capacity: 10,000
Kandy	Colombo	Colombo	Colombo
Pallekele International Cricket Stadium	Paikiasothy Saravanamuttu Stadium	Sinhalese Sports Club Ground	Moors Sports Club Ground
Capacity: 35,000	Capacity: 15,000	Capacity: 10,000	Capacity: 15,000

== Rules and regulations ==
Points
Results	Points
Win	5 points
Tie	2 points
No Result _{(but play started)}	2-point
Loss	0 points

Teams received 5 points for a win, 2 for a tie or no result, and 0 for a loss. At the end of the regular matches the teams ranked two and three play each other in the preliminary final. The winner of the preliminary final earns the right to play the first placed team in the final at the home venue of the first placed team. In the event of several teams finishing with the same number of points, standings are determined by most wins, then net run rate (NRR).

== Standings and tournament progression ==
=== Standings ===
Team	Pld	W	T	L	NR	Pts	NRR
Ruhuna elevens	5	3	0	1	1	16	+1.273
Kandurata elevens	5	3	0	2	0	15	+1.034
Wayamba elevens	5	3	0	2	0	14	+0.547
Basnahira North elevens	5	2	0	3	0	10	+0.045
Basnahira South elevens	5	2	0	2	1	10	−1.031
Sri Lanka Cricket Combined XI	5	1	0	4	0	5	−1.538

Full table on cricinfo
(C) = Eventual Champion; (R) = Runner-up.

=== Tournament progression ===
	Group Matches					Knockout				
Team	1	2	3	4	5	SF	F			
Basnahira North	0	0	0	5	10					
Basnahira South	5	5	10	10	15	L				
Kandurata	5	10	15	15	15	W	W			
Ruhuna	5	10	10	15	15	W	L			
Uva	0	0	0	5	0					
Wayamba	0	5	10	10	15	L				
Note: The total points at the end of each group match are listed.								Win	Loss	No result
Note: Click on the points (group matches)or W/L (Knockout) to see the summary for the match.								Team was eliminated before the league reached this stage.		

== Fixtures ==
=== Round 1 ===
6 February 2010
Scorecard

Sri Lanka Cricket Combined XI; 102 (27.3 overs)	v	Ruhuna; 293/6 (50 overs)
Bhanuka Rajapaksa 59 (61); Chathura Peiris 2/62 (10 overs)		Sanath Jayasuriya 87 (86); Lasith Malinga 4/21 (8 overs)

Ruhuna won by 191 runs
Galle International Stadium
Umpires: Lyndon Hannibal and Tyron Wijewardene

- Sri Lanka Cricket Combined XI, who chose to field

6 February 2010
Scorecard

Wayamba; 253 (48.1 overs)	v	Basnahira South; 271/8 (50 overs)
Farveez Maharoof 70* (72); Suranga Lakmal 3/50 (9.1 overs)		Malinga Bandara 59* (56); Rangana Herath 2/37 (10 overs)

Basnahira South won by 18 runs
Welagedara Stadium
Umpires: Kumar Dharmasena and SH Sarathkumara

- Basnahira South, who chose to bat

6 February 2010
Scorecard

Basnahira North; 201 (44.5 overs)	v	Kandurata; 253/5 (50 overs)
Angelo Mathews 52 (76); Sachithra Serasinghe 3/46 (10 overs)		Chinthaka Jayasinghe 69* (69); Thilan Thushara 2/32 (7 overs)

Kandurata won by 52 runs
Colts Cricket Club Ground
Umpires: Gamini Dissanayake and Ranmore Martinesz

- Kandurata, who chose to bat

=== Round 2 ===
9 February 2010
Scorecard

Sri Lanka Cricket Combined XI; 204 (49.4 overs)	v	Wayamba; 289/7 (50 overs)
Chathura Peiris 60 (69); Demintha Dahanayake 2/47 (10 overs)		Jeevantha Kulatunga 132 (135); Chanaka Welegedara 3/24 (5 overs)

Wayamba won by 85 runs
Colts Cricket Club Ground
Umpires: Gamini Dissanayake and Tyron Wijewardene

- Sri Lanka Cricket Combined XI, who chose to field

9 February 2010
Scorecard

Basnahira South; 209 (42.1 overs)	v	Kandurata; 306/8 (50 overs)
Malinda Warnapura 45 (55); Suranga Lakmal 4/67 (10 overs)		Kaushalya Weeraratne 73 (60); Muttiah Muralitharan 3/29 (8 overs)

Kandurata won by 97 runs
Tyronne Fernando Stadium
Umpires: Kumar Dharmasena and SH Sarathkumara

- Basnahira South, who chose to field

9 February 2010
Scorecard

Ruhuna; 287/9 (50 overs)	v	Basnahira North; 161 (41.1 overs)
Indika de Saram 67 (82); Sachithra Senanayake 4/30 (8.1 overs)		Dimuth Karunaratne 37 (31); Sachithra Serasinghe 3/34 (10 overs)

Ruhuna won by 126 runs
Galle International Stadium
Umpires: Lyndon Hannibal and Ranmore Martinesz

- Ruhuna, who chose to bat

=== Round 3 ===
11 February 2010
Scorecard

Basnahira South; 274/9 (49.5 overs)	v	Basnahira North; 271 (49.5 overs)
Janaka Gunaratne 60 (45); Janaka Gunaratne 3/34 (9 overs)		Dimuth Karunaratne 54 (51); Shanuka Dissanayake 5/45 (10 overs)

Basnahira South won by 1 wicket
Tyronne Fernando Stadium
Umpires: Kumar Dharmasena and Gamini Dissanayake

- Basnahira South, who chose to field

11 February 2010
Scorecard

Sri Lanka Cricket Combined XI; 190 (46.3 overs)	v	Kandurata; 194/2 (33.5 overs)
Kithuruwan Vithanage 53 (62); Maduka Liyanapathiranage 2/50 (9.5 overs)		Tharanga Paranavitana 102 (111); Dilhara Fernando 4/29 (9 overs)

Kandurata won by 8 wickets
Nondescripts Cricket Club Ground
Umpires: Asoka De Silva and Lyndon Hannibal

- Sri Lanka Cricket Combined XI, who chose to bat

11 February 2010
Scorecard

Wayamba; 112/5 (23.4 overs)	v	Ruhuna; 111 (32.1 overs)
Mahela Udawatte 28 (30); Ajantha Mendis 2/20 (6 overs)		Dinesh Chandimal 31 (33); Sachithra Senanayake 3/30 (8 overs)

Wayamba won by 5 wickets
Welagedara Stadium
Umpires: SH Sarathkumara and Tyron Wijewardene

- Wayamba, who chose to field

=== Round 4 ===
14 February 2010
Scorecard

Ruhuna; 213 (50 overs)	v	Kandurata; 209 (49.4 overs)
Upul Tharanga 93 (135); Sanath Jayasuriya 4/26 (10 overs)		Jeevan Mendis 59 (88); Suraj Randiv 3/29 (10 overs)

Ruhuna won by 4 runs
Galle International Stadium
Umpires: Asoka De Silva and Grashan Liyanage

- Ruhuna, who chose to bat

14 February 2010
Scorecard

Basnahira North; 199/4 (38 overs)	v	Wayamba; 196 (42.4 overs)
Sachithra Serasinghe 52* (60); Shanuka Dissanayake 4/34 (10 overs)		Kushal Janith Perera 63 (72); Ajantha Mendis 1/36 (8 overs)

Basnahira North won by 6 wickets
Tyronne Fernando Stadium
Umpires: Kumar Dharmasena and Maurici Zilva

- Wayamba, who chose to bat

14 February 2010
Scorecard

Basnahira South; 157 (36.4 overs)	v	Sri Lanka Cricket Combined XI; 288 (50 overs)
Lahiru Thirimanne 46 (70); Janaka Gunaratne 3/30 (5 overs)		Rumesh Buddika 94 (90); Chathura Peiris 3/49 (7.4 overs)

Sri Lanka Cricket Combined XI won by 131 runs
Moors Sports Club Ground
Umpires: Ranmore Martinesz and Tyron Wijewardene

- Sri Lanka Cricket Combined XI, who chose to bat

=== Round 5 ===
16 February 2010
Scorecard

Basnahira North; 140/7 (21.3 overs)	v	Sri Lanka Cricket Combined XI; 138 (33.2 overs)
Angelo Mathews 58 (44); Sachithra Serasinghe 3/28 (9 overs)		Arosh Janoda 28 (27); Arosh Janoda 4/72 (9 overs)

Basnahira North won by 3 wickets
Tyronne Fernando Stadium
Umpires: Grashan Liyanage and Ranmore Martinesz

- Sri Lanka Cricket Combined XI, who chose to bat

16 February 2010
Scorecard

Basnahira South; 230/8 (50 overs)	v	Ruhuna; 61/4 (15 overs)
Janaka Gunaratne 44 (59); Chinthaka Perera 2/23 (5 overs)		Gihan De Silva 18* (17); TM Sampath 3/47 (10 overs)

No result
Paikiasothy Saravanamuttu Stadium
Umpires: Lyndon Hannibal and Prageeth Rambukwella

- Ruhuna, who chose to field

16 February 2010
Scorecard

Kandurata; 312/4 (50 overs)	v	Wayamba; 147/3 (25 overs)
Kaushalya Weeraratne 143 (158); Suraj Randiv 2/19 (6 overs)		Jeevantha Kulatunga 50 (55); Kaushal Lokuarachchi 1/37 (10 overs)

Wayamba won by 2 runs (D/L method)
Pallekele International Cricket Stadium
Umpires: Gamini Dissanayake and Maurici Zilva

- Wayamba, who chose to field

== Knockout stage ==
Semi-finals
19 February – Nondescripts Cricket Club Ground
Kandurata	124/1 (20.1 overs)
Wayamba	123 (23.4 overs)
19 February – Tyronne Fernando Stadium
Ruhuna	228 (48.3 overs)
Basnahira South	189 (47 overs)

Final
21 February – Tyronne Fernando Stadium
Kandurata	264/7 (49.1 overs)
Ruhuna	263/7 (50 overs)

=== Semi Final 1 ===
19 February 2010
Scorecard

Kandurata; 124/1 (20.1 overs)	v	Wayamba; 123 (23.4 overs)
Kaushalya Weeraratne 67* (61); Tharanga Paranavitana 43 (51); Thilan Thushara 5/39 (8 overs); Dilhara Fernando 2/20 (5 overs)		Kushal Janith Perera 27 (31); Jehan Mubarak 23 (32); Kaushal Lokuarachchi 1/12 (5 overs); Ajantha Mendis 0/24 (4.1 overs)

Kandurata won by 9 wickets
Nondescripts Cricket Club Ground
Umpires: Lyndon Hannibal and SH Sarathkumara

- Kandurata, who chose to field

=== Semi Final 2 ===
19 February 2010
Scorecard

Ruhuna; 228 (48.3 overs)	v	Basnahira South; 189 (47 overs)
Indika de Saram 76 (107); Upul Tharanga 39 (51); Sachithra Senanayake 2/27 (9 overs); Sajeewa Weerakoon 2/28 (9 overs)		Chamara Silva 33 (52); Lahiru Thirimanne 33 (67); Chinthaka Perera 3/47 (8 overs); Malinga Bandara 2/35 (9.3 overs)

Ruhuna won by 39 runs
Tyronne Fernando Stadium
Umpires: Gamini Dissanayake and Maurici Zilva

- Ruhuna, who chose to bat

=== Final ===
21 February 2010
Scorecard

Kandurata; 264/7 (49.1 overs)	v	Ruhuna; 263/7 (50 overs)
Kumar Sangakkara 76 (79); Chamara Kapugedera 50 (49); Muttiah Muralitharan 2/40 (10 overs); Thilan Thushara 1/40 (9 overs)		TM Sampath 59 (92); Sachithra Senanayake 51* (49); Sanath Jayasuriya 2/48 (10 overs); Sachithra Senanayake 1/38 (10 overs)

Kandurata won by 3 wickets
Tyronne Fernando Stadium
Umpires: Grashan Liyanage and Ranmore Martinesz
Player of the match: Kumar Sangakkara

- Ruhuna, who chose to bat
- Kandurata won the 2009–10 Sri Lanka Cricket Inter-Provincial Limited Over Tournament

== Statistics ==
=== Awards ===
- Man of the Tournament – Kaushalya Weeraratne: 371 runs (411 balls), highest score of 143 (158 balls) (Kandurata)
- Batsman of the Tournament – Upul Tharanga: 292 runs (412 balls), highest score of 93 (135 balls) (Ruhuna)
- Bowler of the Tournament – Sachithra Senanayake: 14 wickets (57.1 overs), best innings bowling of 4/30 (8.1 overs) (Ruhuna)

=== Most Runs ===
The top five highest run scorers (total runs) in the season are included in this table.

Player	Team	Runs	Inns	Avg	S/R	HS	100s	50s
Kaushalya Weeraratne	Kandurata	371	7	61.83	90.26	143	1	2
Upul Tharanga	Ruhuna	292	6	48.66	70.87	93	0	2
Tharanga Paranavitana	Kandurata	272	7	45.33	82.67	102*	1	1
Jeevantha Kulatunga	Wayamba	256	6	42.66	91.75	132	1	1
Chamara Kapugedera	Kandurata	209	7	41.80	94.57	88	0	2

Last Updated 10 January 2011.

=== Most Wickets ===
The following table contains the five leading wicket-takers of the season.

Player	Team	Wkts	Mts	Ave	S/R	Econ	BBI
Sachithra Senanayake	Ruhuna	14	7	14.50	24.5	3.55	4/30
Shanuka Dissanayake	Basnahira North	13	4	11.23	17.2	3.91	5/45
Thilan Thushara	Kandurata	13	5	21.92	20.8	6.30	5/39
Suraj Randiv	Kandurata	11	7	19.36	29.0	4.00	3/29
Muttiah Muralitharan	Kandurata	10	6	17.80	26.9	3.97	3/29

Last Updated 10 January 2011.

=== Highest Team Totals ===
The following table lists the six highest team scores during this season.

Team	Total	Opponent	Ground
Kandurata	312/4	Wayamba	Pallekele International Cricket Stadium
Kandurata	306/8	Basnahira South	Tyronne Fernando Stadium
Ruhuna	293/6	Sri Lanka Cricket Combined XI	Galle International Stadium
Wayamba	289/7	Sri Lanka Cricket Combined XI	Colts Cricket Club Ground
Sri Lanka Cricket Combined XI	288	Basnahira South	Moors Sports Club Ground
Ruhuna	287/9	Basnahira North	Galle International Stadium

Last Updated 10 January 2011.

=== Highest Scores ===
This table contains the top five highest scores of the season made by a batsman in a single innings.

Player	Team	Score	Balls	4s	6s	Opponent	Ground
Kaushalya Weeraratne	Kandurata	143	158	16	3	Wayamba	Pallekele International Cricket Stadium
Jeevantha Kulatunga	Wayamba	132	135	11	4	Sri Lanka Cricket Combined XI	Colts Cricket Club Ground
Tharanga Paranavitana	Kandurata	102*	111	8	3	Sri Lanka Cricket Combined XI	Nondescripts Cricket Club Ground
Rumesh Buddika	Sri Lanka Cricket Combined XI	94	90	11	1	Basnahira South	Moors Sports Club Ground
Upul Tharanga	Ruhuna	93	135	7	0	Kandurata	Galle International Stadium

Last Updated 10 January 2011.

=== Best Bowling Figures ===
This table lists the top five players with the best bowling figures in the season.

Player	Team	Overs	Figures	Opponent	Ground
Thilan Thushara	Kandurata	8.0	5/39	Wayamba	Nondescripts Cricket Club Ground
Shanuka Dissanayake	Basnahira North	10.0	5/45	Basnahira South	Tyronne Fernando Stadium
Lasith Malinga	Ruhuna	8.0	4/21	Sri Lanka Cricket Combined XI	Galle International Stadium
Sanath Jayasuriya	Ruhuna	10.0	4/26	Kandurata	Galle International Stadium
Dilhara Fernando	Kandurata	9.0	4/30	Sri Lanka Cricket Combined XI	Nondescripts Cricket Club Ground

Last Updated 10 January 2011.
