= 2010–11 Inter-Provincial Limited Over Tournament =

- Administrator: Sri Lanka Cricket
- Cricket format: Limited overs cricket
- Tournament format(s): Round-robin and Knockout
- Host: Sri Lanka
- Champions: Kandurata elevens (3rd title)
- Participants: 5
- Matches: 13
- Player of the series: Kumar Sangakkara (Note: Was named Player of the match for the final.)
- Most runs: Kumar Sangakkara 268 (351 balls)
- Most wickets: Chanaka Welegedara 10 (35.5 overs)
- Official website: Cricinfo site

The 2010–11 Inter-Provincial Limited Over Tournament will be the third season of the official Limited overs domestic cricket competition in Sri Lanka. It will be a shorter tournament compared to the previous one with only 13 matches, and all group matches being held at the Sinhalese Sports Club Ground and all three finals at the newly upgraded R. Premadasa Stadium also in Colombo. This edition featured the Uva cricket team's debut in the limited overs tournament of the Inter-Provincial Cricket Tournament, having previously featured in the Inter-Provincial First Class Tournament. This season also saw the introduction of the Basnahira cricket team with the merger of Basnahira North and Basnahira South cricket teams. It will be the first time that the five teams represent five different provinces in the tournament.

This season comprised ten regular matches, two semifinals and a grand final.

== Teams ==
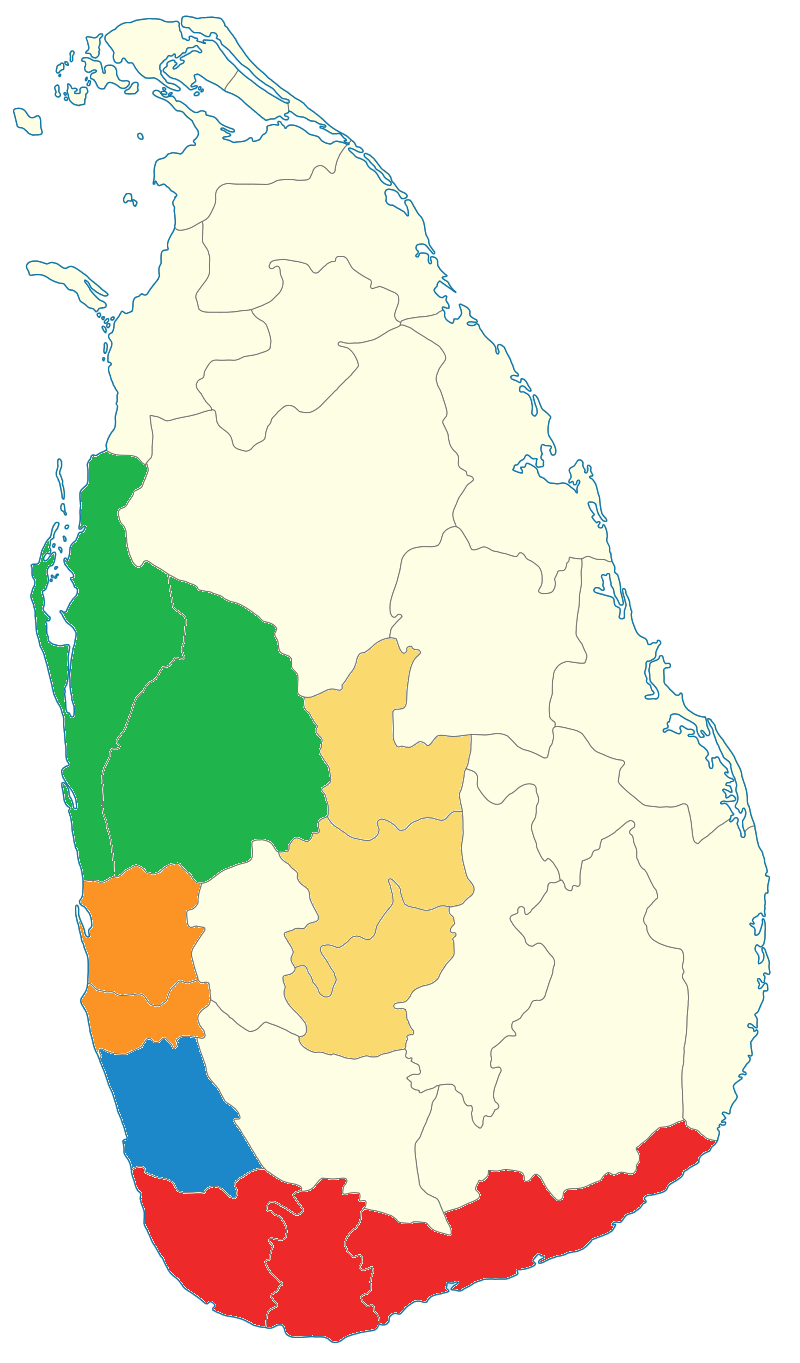
Inter-Provincial Twenty20 teams.

Team name (Sponsored name)	Home ground(s)	Captain
Basnahira elevens Western Province		Tillakaratne Dilshan
Kandurata elevens Central Province	Pallekele International Cricket Stadium	Kumar Sangakkara
Ruhuna elevens Southern Province	Galle International Stadium	Sanath Jayasuriya
Uva elevens Uva		Thilina Kandamby
Wayamba elevens North Western Province	Welagedara Stadium	Jehan Mubarak

== Stadiums ==
Colombo	Colombo
Sinhalese Sports Club Ground; Capacity:10,000; Matches:10	R. Premadasa Stadium; Capacity: 35,000; Matches: 3

== Rules and regulations ==
Points
Results	Points
Win	4 points
Tie	2 points
No Result _{(but play started)}	2-point
Loss	0 points

Teams received 4 points for a win, 2 for a tie or no result, and 0 for a loss. At the end of the regular matches the teams ranked two and three play each other in the preliminary final. The winner of the preliminary final earns the right to play the first placed team in the final at the home venue of the first placed team. In the event of several teams finishing with the same number of points, standings are determined by most wins, then net run rate (NRR).

== Standings and tournament progression ==
=== Standings ===
Team	Pts	Pld	W	T	L	NR	NRR
Wayamba elevens	12	4	3	0	1	0	+0.340
Kandurata elevens (C)	10	4	2	0	2	0	+1.095
Ruhuna elevens	10	4	2	0	2	0	+0.349
Basnahira elevens (R)	8	4	2	0	2	0	−0.625
Uva elevens	4	4	1	0	3	0	−1.077

Full table on cricinfo
(C) = Eventual Champion; (R) = Runner-up.

=== Tournament progression ===
	Group Matches					Knockout				
Team	1	2	3	4	5	SF	F			
Basnahira	0	4	Bye	4	8	W	L			
Kandurata	4	5	5	10	Bye	W	W			
Ruhuna	0	Bye	5	10	10	L				
Uva	Bye	4	4	4	4					
Wayamba	4	4	8	Bye	12	L				
Note: The total points at the end of each group match are listed.								Win	Loss	No result
Note: Click on the points (group matches)or W/L (Knockout) to see the summary for the match.								Team was eliminated before the league reached this stage.		

== Fixtures ==
=== Round 1 ===
11 January 2011
Scorecard

Basnahira; 217/9 (43 overs)	v	Wayamba; 166/2 (29.1 overs)
Tillakaratne Dilshan 58 (72); Chaminda Vaas 1/31 (7 overs)		Dinesh Chandimal 92* (83); Sachithra Senanayake 3/37 (9 overs)

Wayamba won by 47 runs (D/L method)
Sinhalese Sports Club Ground
Umpires: Kumar Dharmasena and Tyron Wijewardene

- Wayamba, who chose to field
- Match shortened due to rain; Duckworth-Lewis revised target to win: 218 runs in 43 overs for Wayamba.

12 January 2011
Scorecard

Kandurata; 268/6 (50 overs)	v	Ruhuna; 115/7 (24.1 overs)
Kumar Sangakkara 68 (109); Chaminda Vidanapathirana 2/13 (4.1 overs)		Chamara Silva 34* (37); Suranga Lakmal 3/48 (9 overs)

Kandurata won by 96 runs (D/L method)
Sinhalese Sports Club Ground
Umpires: Kumar Dharmasena and Ranmore Martinesz

- Ruhuna, who chose to field
- Bad light stopped play at 115/7 off 24.1 overs, match abandoned.

Uva receives a bye for this round.

=== Round 2 ===
13 January 2011
Scorecard

Uva; 200/2 (42.3 overs)	v	Wayamba; 199 (44.5 overs)
Mahela Udawatte 90 (125); Rangana Herath 2/37 (9 overs)		Dimuth Karunaratne 52 (82); Shaminda Eranga 3/31 (8.5 overs)

Uva won by 8 wickets
Sinhalese Sports Club Ground
Umpires: Asoka De Silva and Rohitha Kottahachchi

- Uva, who chose to field
- Match reduced to 47 overs per side.

14 January 2011
Scorecard

Basnahira; 258 (50 overs)	v	Kandurata; 199/5 (42 overs)
TM Sampath 76 (71); Tillakaratne Dilshan 1/19 (7 overs)		Kumar Sangakkara 84 (93); Chaminda Vidanapathirana 3/41 (5 overs)

Basnahira won by 3 runs (D/L method)
Sinhalese Sports Club Ground
Umpires: Lyndon Hannibal and Tyron Wijewardene

- Kandurata, who chose to field
- Kandurata innings shortened due to bad light; Duckworth-Lewis revised target to win: 203 runs from 42 overs
  1 over lost at the start of the innings due to rain in the break.
  Bad light stopped play at 199/5 off 42 overs, match abandoned.

Ruhuna receives a bye for this round.

=== Round 3 ===
15 January 2011
Scorecard

Ruhuna; 285/8 (50 overs)	v	Uva; 131/7 (30 overs)
Sanath Jayasuriya 97 (111); Chinthaka Jayasinghe 2/30 (9 overs)		Mahela Udawatte 50 (63); Malinga Bandara 4/50 (10 overs)

Ruhuna won by 95 runs (D/L method)
Sinhalese Sports Club Ground
Umpires: Prageeth Rambukwella and SH Sarathkumara

- Uva, who chose to field
- Bad light stopped play at 131/7, match abandoned

16 January 2011
Scorecard

Kandurata; 231 (49.1 overs)	v	Wayamba; 251/8 (50 overs)
Chamara Kapugedera 46 (63); Chaminda Vidanapathirana 4/60 (10 overs)		Dinesh Chandimal 82 (102); Chanaka Welegedara 4/50 (9.1 overs)

Wayamba won by 20 runs
Sinhalese Sports Club Ground
Umpires: Asoka De Silva and Grashan Liyanage

- Wayamba, who chose to bat

Basnahira receives a bye for this round.

=== Round 4 ===
17 January 2011
Scorecard

Basnahira; 214 (44.1 overs)	v	Ruhuna; 283/7 (50 overs)
Angelo Mathews 56 (62); Thisara Perera 5/51 (7 overs)		Sanath Jayasuriya 71 (67); Nuwan Pradeep 3/19 (7.1 overs)

Ruhuna won by 69 runs
Sinhalese Sports Club Ground
Umpires: Prageeth Rambukwella and SH Sarathkumara

- Ruhuna, who chose to bat

18 January 2011
Scorecard

Kandurata; 274 (49.5 overs)	v	Uva; 165 (39 overs)
Sachith Pathirana 68 (70); Sohan Boralessa 3/33 (8 overs)		Tharanga Paranavitana 50 (68); Janaka Gunaratne 3/45 (10 overs)

Kandurata won by 109 runs
Sinhalese Sports Club Ground
Umpires: Lyndon Hannibal and Ravindra Kottahachchi

- Kandurata, who chose to bat

Wayamba receives a bye for this round.

=== Round 5 ===
19 January 2011
Scorecard

Ruhuna; 196 (47.4 overs)	v	Wayamba; 197/5 (47.2 overs)
Upul Tharanga 45 (50); Suraj Randiv 1/27 (10 overs)		Dimuth Karunaratne 97 (126); Sahan Wijeratne 3/34 (10 overs)

Wayamba won by 5 wickets
Sinhalese Sports Club Ground
Umpires: Gamini Dissanayake and Ranmore Martinesz

- Ruhuna, who chose to bat

20 January 2011
Scorecard

Basnahira; 214 (46.3 overs)	v	Uva; 208/8 (50 overs)
Thisara Perera 43 (42); Chaminda Vaas 4/13 (8 overs)		Shaminda Eranga 69 (80); Dinuka Hettiarachchi 3/35 (9 overs)

Basnahira won by 6 runs
Sinhalese Sports Club Ground
Umpires: Gamini Dissanayake and Grashan Liyanage

- Uva, who chose to field

Kandurata receives a bye for this round.

== Knockout stage ==
Semi-finals
23 January – R. Premadasa Stadium
Wayamba	152 (38.2 overs)
Basnahira	221/9 (50 overs)
24 January – R. Premadasa Stadium
Kandurata	142/3 (28.5 overs)
Ruhuna	141 (40.2 overs)

Final
26 January – R. Premadasa Stadium
Basnahira	172 (41.3 overs)
Kandurata	225/6 (50 overs)

=== Semi Final 1 ===
23 January 2011
Scorecard

Wayamba; 152 (38.2 overs)	v	Basnahira; 221/9 (50 overs)
Thilan Samaraweera 59 (60); Mahela Jayawardene 39 (66); Ajantha Mendis 3/39 (10 overs); Rangana Herath 2/32 (10 overs)		Tillakaratne Dilshan 62 (81); Angelo Mathews 32 (44); Dilruwan Perera 4/27 (8 overs); Chaminda Vaas 2/18 (7 overs)

Basnahira won by 69 runs
R. Premadasa Stadium
Umpires: Rohitha Kottahachchi and Prageeth Rambukwella

- Basnahira, who chose to bat

=== Semi Final 2 ===
24 January 2011
Scorecard

Kandurata; 142/3 (28.5 overs)	v	Ruhuna; 141 (40.2 overs)
Sachith Pathirana 47 (35); Yohan de Silva 32 (69); Muttiah Muralitharan 3/24 (6.2 overs); Sachith Pathirana 2/31 (9 overs)		Kaushal Silva 38 (70); Sachithra Serasinghe 35 (50); Suraj Randiv 1/41 (10 overs); Sachithra Serasinghe 1/28 (5 overs)

Kandurata won by 7 wickets
R. Premadasa Stadium
Umpires: Gamini Dissanayake and Ranmore Martinesz

- Ruhuna, who chose to bat

=== Final ===
26 January 2011
Scorecard

Basnahira; 172 (41.3 overs)	v	Kandurata; 225/6 (50 overs)
Tillakaratne Dilshan 67 (90); Roshen Silva 31 (52); Sohan Boralessa 4/30 (8.3 overs); Muttiah Muralitharan 2/18 (8 overs)		Kumar Sangakkara 57 (75); Yohan de Silva 48 (88); Thisara Perera 2/42 (8 overs); Lasith Malinga 1/31 (8 overs)

Kandurata won by 53 runs
R. Premadasa Stadium
Umpires: Asoka De Silva and Kumar Dharmasena
Player of the match: Kumar Sangakkara

- Kandurata, who chose to bat
- Kandurata won the 2010/11 Sri Lanka Cricket Inter-Provincial Limited Over Tournament

== Statistics ==
=== Awards ===
- Man of the Tournament – Kumar Sangakkara (Note: Was named Player of the match for the final.): 268 runs (351 balls), highest score of 84 (93 balls) (Kandurata)
- Batsman of the Tournament – Kumar Sangakkara: 268 runs (351 balls), highest score of 84 (93 balls) (Kandurata)
- Bowler of the Tournament – Chanaka Welegedara: 10 wickets (35.5 overs), best innings bowling of 4/50 (9.1 overs) (Wayamba)

=== Most Runs ===
The top five highest run scorers (total runs) in the season are included in this table.

Player	Team	Runs	Inns	Avg	S/R	HS	100s	50s
Kumar Sangakkara	Kandurata	268	6	53.60	76.35	84	0	3
Tillakaratne Dilshan	Basnahira	252	6	42.00	80.25	67	0	4
Dinesh Chandimal	Wayamba	204	5	51.00	86.80	92*	0	2
Sanath Jayasuriya	Ruhuna	203	5	40.60	83.53	97	0	2
Chamara Kapugedera	Kandurata	194	6	38.80	78.22	46	0	0

Last Updated 28 January 2011.

=== Most Wickets ===
The following table contains the five leading wicket-takers of the season.

Player	Team	Wkts	Mts	Ave	S/R	Econ	BBI
Chanaka Welegedara	Wayamba	10	5	19.60	21.5	5.46	4/50
Chaminda Vidanapathirana	Kandurata	9	3	12.66	12.7	5.94	4/60
Muttiah Muralitharan	Kandurata	9	6	21.33	32.2	3.97	3/24
Sohan Boralessa	Kandurata	8	4	15.00	23.6	3.80	4/30
Chaminda Vaas	Basnahira	8	6	21.50	33.7	3.82	4/13

Last Updated 28 January 2011.

=== Highest Team Totals ===
The following table lists the six highest team scores during this season.

Team	Total	Opponent	Ground
Ruhuna	285/8	Uva	Sinhalese Sports Club Ground
Ruhuna	283/7	Basnahira	Sinhalese Sports Club Ground
Kandurata	274	Uva	Sinhalese Sports Club Ground
Kandurata	268/7	Ruhuna	Sinhalese Sports Club Ground
Wayamba	258	Kandurata	Sinhalese Sports Club Ground
Basnahira	251/8	Kandurata	Sinhalese Sports Club Ground

Last Updated 28 January 2011.

=== Highest Scores ===
This table contains the top five highest scores of the season made by a batsman in a single innings.

Player	Team	Score	Balls	4s	6s	Opponent	Ground
Sanath Jayasuriya	Ruhuna	97	111	10	0	Uva	Sinhalese Sports Club Ground
Dimuth Karunaratne	Wayamba	97	126	9	0	Ruhuna	Sinhalese Sports Club Ground
Dinesh Chandimal	Wayamba	92*	83	8	3	Basnahira	Sinhalese Sports Club Ground
Mahela Udawatte	Uva	90	125	12	0	Wayamba	Sinhalese Sports Club Ground
Tharanga Paranavitana	Uva	88*	105	6	1	Wayamba	Sinhalese Sports Club Ground

Last Updated 28 January 2011.

=== Best Bowling Figures ===
This table lists the top five players with the best bowling figures in the season.

Player	Team	Overs	Figures	Opponent	Ground
Thisara Perera	Basnahira	7.0	5/51	Ruhuna	Sinhalese Sports Club Ground
Chaminda Vaas	Basnahira	8.0	4/13	Uva	Sinhalese Sports Club Ground
Dilruwan Perera	Basnahira	8.0	4/27	Wayamba	R. Premadasa Stadium
Sohan Boralessa	Kandurata	8.3	4/30	Basnahira	R. Premadasa Stadium
Malinga Bandara	Uva	10.0	4/50	Ruhuna	Sinhalese Sports Club Ground

Last Updated 28 January 2011.
