= Uva cricket team =

Uva Elevens
Personnel
- Captain: Chaminda Vaas

Team information
- Founded: 2004

History
- First-class debut: Western Province in 2004 at R Premadasa Stadium
- IP FC wins: none
- IP LO wins: none
- IP T20 wins: none
- Official website: Sri Lanka Cricket

The Uva cricket team is a Sri Lankan first class cricket team that represents Uva Province. The team was established in 2004 and only featured in the 2003-04 season of the Inter-Provincial First Class Tournament. The team was captained by Chaminda Vaas. In 2011 the team will be returning for the 2010–11 Inter-Provincial Limited Over Tournament.

== History ==
=== 2003-04 Ten Sports Inter-Provincial Tournament ===
The team played 4 matches overall but won only 1 against North Central Province (17 Jan 2003) but lost matches against Western Province (9 Jan 2003), Southern Province (24 Jan 2003) and Central Province (30 Jan 2003).

=== 2010 ===
The team returned to participate in the 2010–11 Inter-Provincial Limited Over Tournament after a six-year gap and finished bottom of the table with a similar record of winning 1 and losing 3. They won only 1 match against Wayamba Elevens but lost against Ruhuna, Kandurata and Basnahira. But this time their captain was Thilina Kandamby.

== Players ==
=== Current squad ===
Players with international caps are listed in bold.

No.	Name	Nat	Birth date	Batting Style	Bowling Style	Notes
Batsmen
	**Tharanga Paranavitana**	(Sri Lanka)	15 April 1982	Left-hand	Right-arm off-break	
	**Mahela Udawatte**	(Sri Lanka)	19 July 1986	Left-handed	Right-arm off-spin	
	**Lahiru Thirimanne**	(Sri Lanka)	8 September 1989	Left-handed	Right-arm fast-medium	
	Janaka Gunaratne	(Sri Lanka)	14 March 1981	Right-handed	Right-arm off-break	
All-rounders
	**Thilina Kandamby**	(Sri Lanka)	4 June 1982	Left-handed	Right arm leg break	Captain
	Milinda Siriwardene	(Sri Lanka)	4 December 1985	Left-handed	Slow left-arm orthodox	
	**Malinga Bandara**	(Sri Lanka)	31 December 1979	Right-handed	Right arm leg break	
Wicket-keepers
	**Indika De Saram**	(Sri Lanka)	2 September 1973	Right-handed	Right-arm off-break	
	Sameera De Zoysa	(Sri Lanka)	31 January 1987	Left-handed		
Bowlers
	**Shaminda Eranga**	(Sri Lanka)	23 June 1986	Right-handed	Right-arm fast-medium	
	**Dilhara Fernando**	(Sri Lanka)	19 July 1979	Right-handed	Right arm fast-medium	
	**Dinuka Hettiarachchi**	(Sri Lanka)	15 July 1976	Right-handed	Slow left-arm orthodox	
	Ian Daniel	(Sri Lanka)	17 August 1981	Right-handed	Right-arm medium pace	
	**Kaushalya Weeraratne**	(Sri Lanka)	29 January 1981	Left-handed	Right–arm fast-medium	
	Dinesh Daminda	(Sri Lanka)	23 October 1983	Right-handed	Right-arm fast-medium	

=== Notable players ===
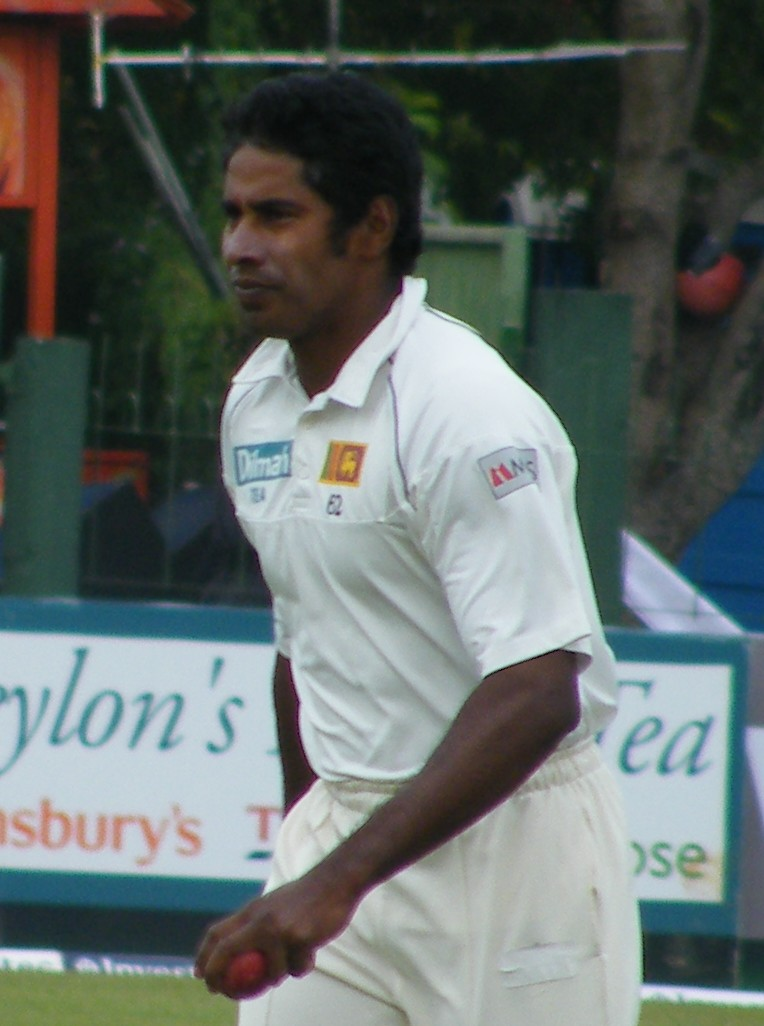
Chaminda Vaas played for Uva

- Avishka Gunawardene
- Chamila Gamage
- Chaminda Vaas
- Dhammika Sudarshana
- Dilhara Lokuhettige
- Ian Daniel
- Jeevantha Kulatunga
- Malintha Gajanayake
- Muthumudalige Pushpakumara
- Naveed Nawaz
- Niroshan Bandaratilleke
- Ravindra Pushpakumara
- Upul Chandana

== Honours ==
=== First Class ===
- Inter-Provincial First Class Tournament: 0

Opponent	Matches	Won	Lost	Win %	First win
Western Province	1	0	1	0	-
Southern Province	1	0	1	0	-
Central Province	1	0	1	0	-
North Central Province	1	1	0	100	17 January 2003

=== List A ===
- Inter-Provincial Limited Over Tournament: 0

Opponent	Matches	Won	Lost	Win %	First win
Wayamba Elevens	1	1	0	100	13 January 2011
Ruhuna	1	0	1	0	-
Kandurata	1	0	1	0	-
Basnahira	1	0	1	0	-

=== Twenty20 ===
- Sri Lanka Premier League: 0

Opponent	Matches	Won	Lost	Win %	First win
