= 2010 World Twenty20 squads =

This is a list of the squads picked for the men's 2010 ICC World Twenty20. This was the third edition of ICC World Twenty20 tournament and was held in the West Indies from 30 April to 16 May 2010.

== Afghanistan ==
Afghanistan announced their 15-man squad for the tournament on 1 April 2010.

Coach: (Pakistan) Kabir Khan

No.	Name	Birth date and age	T20Is	Batting style	Bowling style
48	Nowroz Mangal (c)	28 November 1984 (aged 25)	6	Right-handed	Right arm off break
44	Asghar Afghan	22 February 1987 (aged 23)	2	Right-handed	Right arm medium-fast
77	Dawlat Ahmadzai	5 September 1984 (aged 25)	1	Right-handed	Right arm fast-medium
66	Hameed Hasan	1 June 1987 (aged 22)	6	Right-handed	Right-arm medium
10	Karim Sadiq	18 February 1984 (aged 26)	6	Right-handed	Right arm off break
16	Mirwais Ashraf	30 June 1988 (aged 21)	5	Right-handed	Right arm fast-medium
7	Mohammad Nabi	7 March 1985 (aged 25)	6	Right-handed	Right arm off break
1	Mohammad Shahzad	15 July 1991 (aged 18)	6	Right-handed	n/a; wicket-keeper
	Nasratullah Nasrat	10 May 1984 (aged 25)	0	Left-handed	Slow left arm orthodox
14	Noor Ali Zadran	10 July 1988 (aged 21)	5	Right-handed	Right arm medium-fast
55	Raees Ahmadzai	3 September 1984 (aged 25)	6	Right-handed	Right arm off break
45	Samiullah Shinwari	31 December 1987 (aged 22)	6	Right-handed	Right arm leg break
	Shabir Noori	23 February 1992 (aged 18)	0	Right-handed	Right arm off break
	Shafiqullah Shafaq	7 August 1989 (aged 20)	5	Right-handed	n/a; wicket-keeper
20	Shapoor Zadran	1 January 1985 (aged 25)	6	Left-handed	Left arm fast-medium

== Australia ==
Australia announced their 15-man squad for the tournament on 30 March 2010.

Coach: (South Africa) Tim Nielsen

No.	Name	Birth date and age	T20Is	Batting style	Bowling style	Domestic team
23	Michael Clarke (c)	2 April 1981 (aged 29)	24	Right-handed	Slow left arm orthodox	(Australia) New South Wales Blues
54	Daniel Christian	4 May 1983 (aged 26)	0	Right-handed	Right arm fast-medium	(Australia) Southern Redbacks
57	Brad Haddin	23 October 1977 (aged 32)	15	Right-handed	n/a; wicket-keeper	(Australia) New South Wales Blues
43	Nathan Hauritz	18 October 1981 (aged 28)	3	Right-handed	Right arm off break	(Australia) New South Wales Blues
29	David Hussey	15 July 1977 (aged 32)	16	Right-handed	Right arm off break	(Australia) Victorian Bushrangers
48	Michael Hussey	27 May 1975 (aged 34)	18	Left-handed	Right-arm medium	(Australia) Western Warriors
25	Mitchell Johnson	2 November 1981 (aged 28)	16	Left-handed	Left-arm fast	(Australia) Western Warriors
58	Brett Lee	8 November 1976 (aged 33)	17	Right-handed	Right-arm fast	(Australia) New South Wales Blues
11	Dirk Nannes	16 May 1976 (aged 33)	7	Right-handed	Left-arm fast	(Australia) Victorian Bushrangers
36	Tim Paine	8 December 1984 (aged 25)	1	Right-handed	n/a; wicket-keeper	(Australia) Tasmanian Tigers
49	Steve Smith	2 June 1989 (aged 20)	5	Right-handed	Right arm leg break	(Australia) New South Wales Blues
32	Shaun Tait	22 February 1983 (aged 27)	8	Right-handed	Right-arm fast	(Australia) Southern Redbacks
31	David Warner	27 October 1986 (aged 23)	13	Left-handed	Right arm leg break	(Australia) New South Wales Blues
33	Shane Watson	17 June 1981 (aged 28)	11	Right-handed	Right arm fast-medium	(Australia) New South Wales Blues
7	Cameron White	18 August 1983 (aged 26)	13	Right-handed	Right arm leg break	(Australia) Victorian Bushrangers

== Bangladesh ==
Bangladesh announced their 15-man squad for the tournament on 30 March 2010.

Coach: (Australia) Jamie Siddons

No.	Name	Birth date and age	T20Is	Batting style	Bowling style	Domestic team
75	Shakib Al Hasan (c)	24 March 1987 (aged 23)	12	Left-handed	Slow left arm orthodox	(Bangladesh) Khulna Division
41	Abdur Razzak	15 June 1982 (aged 27)	11	Left-handed	Slow left arm orthodox	(Bangladesh) Khulna Division
97	Aftab Ahmed	10 November 1985 (aged 24)	10	Right-handed	Right-arm medium	(Bangladesh) Chittagong Division
66	Imrul Kayes	2 February 1987 (aged 23)	0	Left-handed	n/a; occasional wicket-keeper	(Bangladesh) Khulna Division
32	Jahurul Islam	12 December 1986 (aged 23)	0	Right-handed	Right arm off break	(Bangladesh) Rajshahi Division
30	Mahmudullah	4 February 1986 (aged 24)	9	Right-handed	Right arm off break	(Bangladesh) Dhaka Division
2	Mashrafe Mortaza	5 October 1983 (aged 26)	11	Right-handed	Right arm fast-medium	(Bangladesh) Khulna Division
7	Mohammad Ashraful	7 July 1984 (aged 25)	13	Right-handed	Right arm off break / leg break	(Bangladesh) Dhaka Division
9	Mushfiqur Rahim	1 September 1988 (aged 21)	13	Right-handed	n/a; wicket-keeper	(Bangladesh) Sylhet Division
	Naeem Islam	31 December 1986 (aged 23)	5	Right-handed	Right arm off break	(Bangladesh) Rajshahi Division
	Rubel Hossain	1 January 1990 (aged 20)	3	Right-handed	Right arm medium-fast	(Bangladesh) Chittagong Division
13	Shafiul Islam	6 October 1989 (aged 20)	1	Right-handed	Right arm fast-medium	(Bangladesh) Rajshahi Division
	Suhrawadi Shuvo	21 November 1988 (aged 21)	0	Left-handed	Slow left arm orthodox	(Bangladesh) Rajshahi Division
47	Syed Rasel	3 July 1984 (aged 25)	8	Left-handed	Left arm medium-fast	(Bangladesh) Khulna Division
29	Tamim Iqbal	20 March 1989 (aged 21)	13	Left-handed	unknown	(Bangladesh) Chittagong Division

== England ==
England announced their 15-man squad for the tournament on 31 March 2010.

Coach: (Zimbabwe) Andy Flower

No.	Name	Birth date and age	T20Is	Batting style	Bowling style	Domestic team
5	Paul Collingwood (c)	26 May 1976 (aged 33)	24	Right-handed	Right arm medium pace	(England) Durham Dynamos
9	James Anderson	30 July 1982 (aged 27)	19	Left-handed	Right arm fast-medium	(England) Lancashire Lightning
42	Ravi Bopara	4 May 1985 (aged 24)	8	Right-handed	Right arm medium pace	(England) Essex Eagles
20	Tim Bresnan	28 February 1985 (aged 25)	5	Right-handed	Right arm fast-medium	(England) Yorkshire Carnegie
8	Stuart Broad	24 June 1986 (aged 23)	20	Left-handed	Right arm fast-medium	(England) Nottinghamshire Outlaws
22	Craig Kieswetter	28 November 1987 (aged 22)	0	Right-handed	n/a; wicket-keeper	(England) Somerset Sabres
45	Michael Lumb	12 February 1980 (aged 30)	0	Left-handed	Right arm medium pace	(England) Hampshire Royals
16	Eoin Morgan	10 September 1986 (aged 23)	5	Left-handed	Right arm medium pace	(England) Middlesex Panthers
24	Kevin Pietersen	27 June 1980 (aged 29)	22	Right-handed	Right arm off break	(England) Hampshire Royals
13	Ajmal Shahzad	27 July 1985 (aged 24)	1	Right-handed	Right arm medium-fast	(England) Yorkshire Carnegie
18	Ryan Sidebottom	15 January 1978 (aged 32)	9	Left-handed	Left arm fast-medium	(England) Nottinghamshire Outlaws
66	Graeme Swann	24 March 1979 (aged 31)	11	Right-handed	Right arm off break	(England) Nottinghamshire Outlaws
53	James Tredwell	27 February 1982 (aged 28)	0	Left-handed	Right arm off break	(England) Kent Spitfires
6	Luke Wright	7 March 1985 (aged 25)	18	Right-handed	Right arm medium-fast	(England) Sussex Sharks
40	Michael Yardy	27 November 1980 (aged 29)	3	Left-handed	Slow left arm orthodox	(England) Sussex Sharks

== India ==
India announced their 15-man squad for the tournament on 26 March 2010.

Coach: (South Africa) Gary Kirsten

No.	Name	Birth date and Age	T20Is	Batting style	Bowling style	IPL team
7	Mahendra Singh Dhoni (c)	7 July 1981 (aged 28)	20	Right-handed	Right-arm medium wicket-keeper	(India) Chennai Super Kings
12	Yuvraj Singh	12 December 1981 (aged 28)	20	Left-handed	Slow left arm orthodox	(India) Kings XI Punjab
24	Piyush Chawla	24 December 1988 (aged 21)	0	Left-handed	Right arm leg break	(India) Kings XI Punjab
5	Gautam Gambhir	14 October 1981 (aged 28)	19	Left-handed	Right arm leg break	(India) Delhi Daredevils
3	Harbhajan Singh	3 July 1980 (aged 29)	17	Right-handed	Right arm off break	(India) Mumbai Indians
26	Ravindra Jadeja	6 December 1988 (aged 21)	5	Left-handed	Slow left arm orthodox	(India) Rajasthan Royals
19	Dinesh Karthik	1 June 1985 (aged 24)	7	Right-handed	wicket-keeper	(India) Delhi Daredevils
34	Zaheer Khan	7 October 1978 (aged 31)	9	Right-handed	Left arm fast-medium	(India) Mumbai Indians
8	Praveen Kumar	2 October 1986 (aged 23)	1	Right-handed	Right arm medium-fast	(India) Royal Challengers Bangalore
64	Ashish Nehra	29 April 1979 (aged 31)	2	Right-handed	Left arm fast-medium	(India) Delhi Daredevils
28	Yusuf Pathan	17 November 1982 (aged 27)	11	Right-handed	Right arm off break	(India) Rajasthan Royals
48	Suresh Raina	27 November 1986 (aged 23)	11	Left-handed	Right arm off break	(India) Chennai Super Kings
6	Murali Vijay	1 April 1984 (aged 26)	0	Right-handed	Right arm off break	(India) Chennai Super Kings
45	Rohit Sharma	30 April 1987 (aged 23)	14	Right-handed	Right arm off break	(India) Deccan Chargers
23	Vinay Kumar	12 February 1984 (aged 26)	0	Right-handed	Right arm medium-fast	(India) Royal Challengers Bangalore

== Ireland ==
Ireland announced their 15-man squad for the tournament on 22 March 2010.

Coach: (Cricket West Indies) Phil Simmons

No.	Name	Birth date and age	T20Is	Batting style	Bowling style	Domestic team
34	William Porterfield (c)	6 September 1984 (aged 25)	15	Left-handed	Right arm off break	(England) Gloucestershire Gladiators
21	Andre Botha	12 September 1975 (aged 34)	12	Left-handed	Right-arm medium	(Republic of Ireland) North County
99	Peter Connell	13 August 1981 (aged 28)	9	Right-handed	Right arm medium-fast	(United Kingdom) North Down
83	Alex Cusack	29 October 1980 (aged 29)	14	Right-handed	Right arm medium-fast	(Republic of Ireland) Clontarf
50	George Dockrell	22 July 1992 (aged 17)	5	Right-handed	Slow left arm orthodox	(Republic of Ireland) Leinster
23	Trent Johnston	29 April 1974 (aged 36)	14	Right-handed	Right arm fast-medium	(Republic of Ireland) Railway Union
57	Nigel Jones	22 April 1982 (aged 28)	1	Right-handed	Right-arm medium	(Republic of Ireland) Civil Service North
17	Gary Kidd	18 September 1985 (aged 24)	6	Left-handed	Slow left arm orthodox	(United Kingdom) Waringstown
10	John Mooney	10 February 1982 (aged 28)	11	Left-handed	Right-arm medium	(Republic of Ireland) North County
22	Kevin O'Brien	4 March 1984 (aged 26)	15	Right-handed	Right arm medium-fast	(England) Nottinghamshire Outlaws
72	Niall O'Brien	8 November 1981 (aged 28)	14	Left-handed	n/a; wicket-keeper	(England) Northamptonshire Steelbacks
30	Boyd Rankin	5 July 1984 (aged 25)	4	Left-handed	Right arm fast-medium	(England) Warwickshire Bears
1	Paul Stirling	3 September 1990 (aged 19)	4	Right-handed	Right arm off break	(England) Middlesex Panthers
12	Andrew White	3 July 1980 (aged 29)	12	Right-handed	Right arm off break	(United Kingdom) Instonians
4	Gary Wilson	5 February 1986 (aged 24)	16	Right-handed	n/a; wicket-keeper	(England) Surrey Lions

== New Zealand ==
New Zealand announced their 15-man squad for the tournament on 31 March 2010.

Coach: (New Zealand) Mark Greatbatch

No.	Name	Birth date and age	T20Is	Batting style	Bowling style	Domestic team
11	Daniel Vettori (c)	27 January 1979 (aged 31)	21	Left-handed	Slow left arm orthodox	(New Zealand) Northern Districts Knights
27	Shane Bond	7 June 1975 (aged 34)	15	Right-handed	Right-arm fast	(New Zealand) Canterbury Wizards
2	Ian Butler	24 November 1981 (aged 28)	12	Right-handed	Right-arm fast	(New Zealand) Northern Districts Knights
31	Martin Guptill	30 September 1986 (aged 23)	15	Right-handed	Right arm off break	(New Zealand) Auckland Aces
48	Gareth Hopkins	24 November 1976 (aged 33)	4	Right-handed	n/a; wicket-keeper	(New Zealand) Auckland Aces
42	Brendon McCullum	27 September 1981 (aged 28)	33	Right-handed	n/a; wicket-keeper	(New Zealand) Otago Volts
15	Nathan McCullum	1 September 1980 (aged 29)	15	Right-handed	Right arm off break	(New Zealand) Otago Volts
37	Kyle Mills	15 March 1979 (aged 31)	15	Right-handed	Right arm fast-medium	(New Zealand) Auckland Aces
	Rob Nicol	28 May 1983 (aged 26)	0	Right-handed	Right-arm medium / off break	(New Zealand) Canterbury Wizards
24	Jacob Oram	28 July 1978 (aged 31)	23	Left-handed	Right arm fast-medium	(New Zealand) Central Districts Stags
40	Aaron Redmond	23 September 1979 (aged 30)	4	Right-handed	Right arm leg break	(New Zealand) Otago Volts
77	Jesse Ryder	6 August 1984 (aged 25)	9	Left-handed	Right-arm medium	(New Zealand) Wellington Firebirds
38	Tim Southee	11 December 1988 (aged 21)	11	Right-handed	Right arm medium-fast	(New Zealand) Northern Districts Knights
56	Scott Styris	10 July 1975 (aged 34)	22	Right-handed	Right-arm medium	(New Zealand) Northern Districts Knights
3	Ross Taylor	8 March 1984 (aged 26)	27	Right-handed	Right arm off break	(New Zealand) Central Districts Stags

== Pakistan ==
Pakistan announced their 15-man squad on 12 March 2010, but no captain was announced. On 23 March 2010, the Pakistan Cricket Board appointed Shahid Afridi as the captain. Umar Gul and Yasir Arafat were included in the original squad but were replaced by Mohammad Sami and Abdur Rehman due to injury.

Coach: (Pakistan) Waqar Younis

No.	Name	Birth date and age	T20Is	Batting style	Bowling style	Domestic team
10	Shahid Afridi (c)	1 March 1980 (aged 30)	27	Right-handed	Right arm leg break	(Pakistan) Karachi Dolphins
12	Abdul Razzaq	2 December 1979 (aged 30)	11	Right-handed	Right arm fast-medium	(Pakistan) Sialkot Stallions
28	Fawad Alam	8 October 1985 (aged 24)	18	Left-handed	Slow left-arm orthodox	(Pakistan) Karachi Dolphins
	Hammad Azam	16 March 1991 (aged 19)	0	Right-handed	Right-arm medium	(Pakistan) Rawalpindi Rams
23	Kamran Akmal	13 January 1982 (aged 28)	28	Right-handed	n/a; wicket-keeper	(Pakistan) Lahore Lions
35	Khalid Latif	4 November 1985 (aged 24)	35	Right-handed	Right arm off break	(Pakistan) Karachi Dolphins
22	Misbah-ul-Haq	28 May 1974 (aged 35)	23	Right-handed	Right arm leg break	(Pakistan) Faisalabad Wolves
90	Mohammad Aamer	13 April 1992 (aged 18)	10	Left-handed	Left-arm fast	(Pakistan) Rawalpindi Rams
26	Mohammad Asif	20 December 1982 (aged 27)	10	Left-handed	Right arm fast-medium	(Pakistan) Sialkot Stallions
88	Mohammad Hafeez	17 October 1982 (aged 27)	9	Right-handed	Right arm off break	(Pakistan) Faisalabad Wolves
50	Saeed Ajmal	14 October 1977 (aged 32)	14	Right-handed	Right arm off break	(Pakistan) Sialkot Stallions
1	Salman Butt	7 October 1984 (aged 25)	16	Left-handed	Right arm off break	(Pakistan) Lahore Lions
96	Umar Akmal	26 May 1990 (aged 19)	6	Right-handed	unknown	(Pakistan) Lahore Lions
7	Mohammad Sami	24 February 1981 (aged 29)	0	Right-handed	Right-arm fast	(Pakistan) Karachi Dolphins
36	Abdur Rehman	1 March 1980 (aged 30)	2	Left-handed	Slow left-arm orthodox	(Pakistan) Sialkot Stallions

== South Africa ==
South Africa announced their 15-man squad for the tournament on 31 March 2010.

Coach: (South Africa) Corrie van Zyl

No.	Name	Birth date and age	T20Is	Batting style	Bowling style	Domestic team
15	Graeme Smith (c)	1 February 1981 (aged 29)	20	Left-handed	Right arm off break	(South Africa) Cape Cobras
14	Loots Bosman	14 April 1977 (aged 33)	6	Right-handed	Right arm medium pace	(South Africa) Dolphins
22	Johan Botha	2 May 1982 (aged 27)	16	Right-handed	Right arm off break	(South Africa) Warriors
9	Mark Boucher	3 December 1976 (aged 33)	20	Right-handed	n/a; wicket-keeper	(South Africa) Warriors
17	AB de Villiers	17 February 1984 (aged 26)	23	Right-handed	Right arm medium pace & wicket-keeper	(South Africa) Titans
21	JP Duminy	14 April 1984 (aged 26)	18	Left-handed	Right arm off break	(South Africa) Cape Cobras
09	Herschelle Gibbs	23 February 1974 (aged 36)	20	Right-handed	Right arm leg break	(South Africa) Cape Cobras
3	Jacques Kallis	16 October 1975 (aged 34)	10	Right-handed	Right arm fast-medium	(South Africa) Warriors
23	Rory Kleinveldt	15 March 1983 (aged 27)	1	Right-handed	Right arm fast-medium	(South Africa) Cape Cobras
67	Charl Langeveldt	17 December 1974 (aged 35)	4	Right-handed	Right arm fast-medium	(South Africa) Cape Cobras
81	Albie Morkel	10 June 1981 (aged 28)	24	Left-handed	Right arm medium-fast	(South Africa) Titans
65	Morné Morkel	6 October 1984 (aged 25)	9	Left-handed	Right-arm fast	(South Africa) Titans
8	Dale Steyn	27 June 1983 (aged 26)	14	Right-handed	Right-arm fast	(South Africa) Titans
32	Juan Theron	24 July 1985 (aged 24)	0	Right-handed	Right arm medium-fast	(South Africa) Warriors
52	Roelof van der Merwe	31 December 1984 (aged 25)	9	Right-handed	Slow left arm orthodox	(South Africa) Titans

== Sri Lanka ==
Sri Lanka announced their 15-man squad for the tournament on 31 March 2010.

Coach: (Australia) Trevor Bayliss

No.	Name	Birth date and age	T20Is	Batting style	Bowling style	Domestic team
11	Kumar Sangakkara (c)	27 October 1977 (aged 32)	20	Left-handed	n/a; wicket-keeper	(Sri Lanka) Kandurata
17	Dinesh Chandimal	18 November 1989 (aged 20)	0	Right-handed	n/a; wicket-keeper	(Sri Lanka) Ruhuna
23	Tillakaratne Dilshan	14 October 1976 (aged 33)	23	Right-handed	Right arm off break	(Sri Lanka) Basnahira South
18	Chinthaka Jayasinghe	19 May 1978 (aged 31)	2	Right-handed	Right-arm medium	(Sri Lanka) Kandurata
07	Sanath Jayasuriya	30 June 1969 (aged 40)	23	Left-handed	Slow left arm orthodox	(Sri Lanka) Ruhuna
27	Mahela Jayawardene	27 May 1977 (aged 32)	23	Right-handed	Right-arm medium	(Sri Lanka) Wayamba
16	Chamara Kapugedera	24 February 1987 (aged 23)	11	Right-handed	Right-arm medium	(Sri Lanka) Kandurata
92	Nuwan Kulasekara	22 July 1982 (aged 27)	9	Right-handed	Right arm fast-medium	(Sri Lanka) Basnahira North
99	Lasith Malinga	28 August 1983 (aged 26)	20	Right-handed	Right-arm fast	(Sri Lanka) Ruhuna
69	Angelo Mathews	2 June 1987 (aged 22)	12	Right-handed	Right arm fast-medium	(Sri Lanka) Basnahira North
40	Ajantha Mendis	11 March 1985 (aged 25)	12	Right-handed	Right arm off break / leg break	(Sri Lanka) Wayamba
08	Muttiah Muralitharan	17 April 1972 (aged 38)	9	Right-handed	Right arm off break	(Sri Lanka) Kandurata
15	Thissara Perera	3 April 1989 (aged 21)	0	Left-handed	Right arm medium-fast	(Sri Lanka) Wayamba
88	Suraj Randiv	30 January 1985 (aged 25)	0	Right-handed	Right arm off break	(Sri Lanka) Kandurata
12	Chanaka Welegedara	20 March 1981 (aged 29)	0	Right-handed	Left arm fast-medium	(Sri Lanka) Wayamba

== West Indies ==
The West Indies announced their 15-man squad for the tournament on 1 April 2010.

Coach: (Cricket West Indies) Ottis Gibson

No.	Name	Birth date and age	T20Is	Batting style	Bowling style	Domestic team
45	Chris Gayle (c)	21 September 1979 (aged 30)	14	Left-handed	Right arm off break	Jamaica
62	Sulieman Benn	22 July 1981 (aged 28)	11	Left-handed	Slow left arm orthodox	Barbados
47	Dwayne Bravo	7 October 1983 (aged 26)	15	Right-handed	Right arm medium-fast	Trinidad and Tobago
6	Shivnarine Chanderpaul	16 August 1974 (aged 35)	16	Left-handed	Right arm leg break	Guyana
12	Narsingh Deonarine	16 August 1983 (aged 26)	2	Left-handed	Right arm off break	Guyana
72	Andre Fletcher	28 November 1987 (aged 22)	9	Right-handed	Right arm medium-fast	Windward Islands
68	Wavell Hinds	7 September 1976 (aged 33)	3	Left-handed	Right-arm medium	Jamaica
33	Nikita Miller	16 May 1982 (aged 27)	3	Right-handed	Slow left arm orthodox	Jamaica
55	Kieron Pollard	12 May 1987 (aged 22)	13	Right-handed	Right arm medium-fast	Trinidad and Tobago
80	Denesh Ramdin	13 March 1985 (aged 25)	19	Right-handed	n/a; wicket-keeper	Trinidad and Tobago
14	Ravi Rampaul	15 October 1984 (aged 25)	6	Left-handed	Right arm fast-medium	Trinidad and Tobago
24	Kemar Roach	30 June 1988 (aged 21)	5	Right-handed	Right-arm fast	Barbados
88	Darren Sammy	20 December 1983 (aged 26)	12	Right-handed	Right arm fast-medium	Windward Islands
53	Ramnaresh Sarwan	23 June 1980 (aged 29)	11	Right-handed	Right arm leg break	Guyana
75	Jerome Taylor	22 June 1984 (aged 25)	12	Right-handed	Right-arm fast	Jamaica

== Zimbabwe ==
Zimbabwe announced their 15-man squad for the tournament on 26 March 2010.

Coach: (England) Alan Butcher

No.	Name	Birth date and age	T20Is	Batting style	Bowling style	Domestic team
52	Prosper Utseya (c)	26 March 1985 (aged 25)	8	Right-handed	Right arm off break	(Zimbabwe) Mountaineers
6	Andy Blignaut	1 August 1978 (aged 31)	0	Left-handed	Right arm medium-fast	(Zimbabwe) Matabeleland Tuskers
33	Chamu Chibhabha	6 September 1986 (aged 23)	7	Right-handed	Right-arm medium	(Zimbabwe) Southern Rocks
47	Elton Chigumbura	14 March 1986 (aged 24)	8	Right-handed	Right-arm medium	(Zimbabwe) Mashonaland Eagles
74	Charles Coventry	8 March 1983 (aged 27)	0	Right-handed	Right arm leg break	(Zimbabwe) Matabeleland Tuskers
30	Graeme Cremer	19 September 1986 (aged 23)	2	Right-handed	Right arm leg break	(Zimbabwe) Mid West Rhinos
77	Craig Ervine	19 August 1985 (aged 24)	0	Left-handed	Right arm off break	(Zimbabwe) Southern Rocks
19	Greg Lamb	4 March 1981 (aged 29)	1	Right-handed	Right-arm medium / off break	(Zimbabwe) Mashonaland Eagles
65	Timycen Maruma	19 April 1988 (aged 22)	3	Right-handed	Right arm leg break	(Zimbabwe) Mountaineers
3	Hamilton Masakadza	9 August 1983 (aged 26)	8	Right-handed	Right-arm medium	(Zimbabwe) Mountaineers
28	Christopher Mpofu	27 November 1985 (aged 24)	3	Right-handed	Right-arm medium	(Zimbabwe) Matabeleland Tuskers
7	Ray Price	12 June 1976 (aged 33)	5	Right-handed	Slow left arm orthodox	(Zimbabwe) Mashonaland Eagles
46	Vusi Sibanda	10 October 1983 (aged 26)	3	Right-handed	Right-arm medium	(Zimbabwe) Mid West Rhinos
44	Tatenda Taibu	14 May 1983 (aged 26)	7	Right-handed	n/a; wicket-keeper	(Zimbabwe) Mountaineers
1	Brendan Taylor	6 February 1986 (aged 24)	4	Right-handed	n/a; wicket-keeper	(Zimbabwe) Mid West Rhinos
