= Basnahira North cricket team =

Basnahira North
- One Day name: Basnahira North elevens

Personnel
- Captain: Thilina Kandamby

Team information
- Founded: Western Province; 1990–1991; Basnahira North; 1992–2010; Basnahira; 2011
- Home ground: R. Premadasa Stadium
- Capacity: 35,000

History
- First-class debut: vs Ruhuna cricket team in 1992 at Sinhalese Sports Club Ground
- IP FC wins: 3 (1992, 2008–09, 2009–10)
- IP LO wins: none
- IP T20 wins: none
- Official website: Sri Lanka Cricket

Basnahira North cricket team represents northern region of Western Province, Sri Lanka in first-class cricket tournaments. Basnahira North is based in Colombo. The team competes in two Sri Lankan domestic cricket competitions. The first-class Inter-Provincial tournament and the Twenty20 competition known as the Inter-Provincial Twenty20. The team also participated in, now defunct, the Inter-Provincial Limited Overs Tournament in 2007–08. From 2009 onwards champions of the Inter-Provincial Twenty20 tournament will be eligible to represent Sri Lanka in Twenty20 Champions League. But Basnahira North did not win the title in this year. The team draws cricketers from first-class club competition Premier Limited Overs Tournament. The top 75 players of the tournament selected for the Inter-Provincial tournament.

Basnahira North's home ground is R. Premadasa Stadium, which is situated in northern part of city of Colombo. E-wis, a Sri Lankan IT company is the team's sponsor. Many cricketers who had represented leading schools in Colombo ended up playing for the Western province. Current captain of the side, Chaminda Vaas is a player who studied at the St. Joseph's College, Colombo.

== 2008/09 season ==
Basnhira North won the 2008–09 Inter-Provincial tournament beating Wayamba by 10 wickets in the finals. Angelo Mathews scored 152 runs in the finals and finished as the highest scorer in the tournament. Earlier in the tournament Mathews also scored a career best 270 against Kandurata. In 2009 Inter-Provincial Twenty20 tournament they managed to beat only the Schools invitational XI. The team did not qualify for the semi-finals.

== Name and participation ==
From the early years of the Inter-Provincial tournament to 2004–05 season teams used English names. But from 2007 to 2008 onwards the teams were named in Sinhalese. From its inception of the tournament Western Province presented more than one team to the tournament except for 2003–04 and 2004–05 seasons. Since then Western province teams became known as Basnahira North and Basnahira South. Basnahira is Sinhalese for West. Number of teams representing Western province varied from season to season and their names also. Teams represented Western Province for the each tournament given below.

Team	Season										
Team	1990	1990–91	1992	1993–94	1994–95	2003–04	2004–05	2007–08	2008–09	2009–10	2010–11
Western Province	Western Province	City, Suburbs	Suburbs, North, South	City, North, South		Western Province		North, South			Basnahira

== Notable players ==
The following is a list of players who have represented both Basnahira North and Sri Lanka.

- (Sri Lanka) Kumar Dharmasena
- (Sri Lanka) Chandika Hathurusinghe
- (Sri Lanka) Hashan Tillakaratne
- (Sri Lanka) Aravinda de Silva
- (Sri Lanka) Sanath Jayasuriya
- (Sri Lanka) Roshan Jurangpathy
- (Sri Lanka) Gamini Wickremasinghe
- (Sri Lanka) Asoka de Silva
- (Sri Lanka) Graeme Labrooy
- (Sri Lanka) Kapila Wijegunawardene
- (Sri Lanka) Champaka Ramanayake
- (Sri Lanka) Ajith Weerakkody
- (Sri Lanka) Roshan Mahanama
- (Sri Lanka) Sanjeeva Ranatunga
- (Sri Lanka) Chamara Dunusinghe
- (Sri Lanka) Manjula Munasinghe
- (Sri Lanka) Nishantha Ranatunga
- (Sri Lanka) Dammika Ranatunga
- (Sri Lanka) Dulip Samaraweera
- (Sri Lanka) Chaminda Vaas
- (Sri Lanka) Arjuna Ranatunga
- (Sri Lanka) Indika de Saram
- (Sri Lanka) Sajeewa de Silva
- (Sri Lanka) Hemantha Wickramaratne
- (Sri Lanka) Dinuka Hettiarachchi
- (Sri Lanka) Shantha Kalavitigoda
- (Sri Lanka) Avishka Gunawardene
- (Sri Lanka) Thilina Kandamby
- (Sri Lanka) Gayan Wijekoon
- (Sri Lanka) Nuwan Kulasekara
- (Sri Lanka) Dammika Prasad
- (Sri Lanka) Angelo Mathews
- (Sri Lanka) Niroshan Bandaratilleke

== Current squad ==
The squad for the 2008–09 season as of 22 March 2009.

Basnahira North current squad
Players
Coaches

Nat.	Name	Age	Pos.	Bat st.	Bowl st.
(Sri Lanka)	Chaminda Vaas (Captain)	35	All-rounder	LHB	LFM
(Sri Lanka)	Thilina Kandamby	26	Batsman	LHB	LS
(Sri Lanka)	Amal Athulathmudali	22	Batsman	LHB	RFM
(Sri Lanka)	Ian Daniel	27	Batsman	RHB	RM
(Sri Lanka)	Daminda Darshanpriya	25	Bowler	RHB	RMF
(Sri Lanka)	Shanuka Dissanayake	31	All-rounder	RHB	LO
(Sri Lanka)	Nuwan Pradeep	22	Bowler	RHB	RFM
(Sri Lanka)	Saliya Saman	23	All-rounder	RHB	RFM
(Sri Lanka)	Nuwan Kulasekara	26	Bowler	RHB	RFM
(Sri Lanka)	Angelo Mathews	21	All-rounder	RHB	RFM
(Sri Lanka)	Dhanuka Pathirana	26	Batsman	RHB	OS
(Sri Lanka)	Bhathiya Perera	31	All-rounder	RHB	LS
(Sri Lanka)	Muthumudalige Pushpakumara	27	All-rounder	LHB	OS
(Sri Lanka)	Kaushal Silva	22	Wicket keeper	RHB
(Sri Lanka)	Gayan Wijekoon	32	All-rounder	LHB	RM

== Honours ==
- Inter-Provincial Tournament: 1

2008/09

- Inter-Provincial Limited Overs Tournament:

- Inter-Provincial Twenty20:
