= List of Basnahira representative cricketers =

This is a list of cricket players who have played representative cricket for Basnahira in Sri Lanka. Basnahira cricket team was founded in 2011.

It includes players who have played at least one match, in senior First-Class, List A cricket, or Twenty20 matches. Practice matches are not included, unless they have officially been classified at First-class tour matches.

The Inter-Provincial Cricket Tournament is the premier domestic cricket competition in Sri Lanka. It was founded in 1990.

== First Class Players ==
Basnahira is yet to play any First-Class matches.

== List 'A' Players ==
All the Players who have represented Basnahira in List A cricket domestic one day competitions:

1. Jeevantha Kulatunga
2. Tillakaratne Dilshan
3. Malinda Warnapura
4. Angelo Mathews
5. Chaminda Vaas
6. Tillakaratne Sampath
7. Roshen Silva
8. Tissara Perera
9. Lasith Malinga
10. Kushal Perera
11. Sajeewa Weerakoon
12. Kaushal Lokuarachchi
13. Hasantha Fernando
14. Dilruwan Perera
15. Thilan Thushara

== Twenty20 Players ==
All of the players who have represented Basnahira in Twenty20 domestic competitions:

1. Dilshan Munaweera
2. Jeevantha Kulatunga
3. Saman Jayantha
4. Ramith Rambukwella
5. Prasanna Jayawardene
6. Chinthaka Jayasinghe
7. Sanjaya Gangodawila
8. Rangana Herath
9. Dilruwan Perera
10. Chathura Peiris
11. Dammika Kariyawasam
12. Tillakaratne Dilshan
13. Ishara Amerasinghe
14. Nadeera Nawela
