= Moors Sports Club Ground =

Cricket stadium in Sri Lanka

Coordinates: 6°55′4″N 79°51′25″E

- Interactive map of Moors Sports Club Ground

Ground information
- Location: Muttaiah Road and Braybrooke Place, Colombo 02
- Country: Sri Lanka
- Owner: Moors Sports Club
- End names
- Main Pavilion End; Score Board End

International information
- First women's ODI: 13 April 1998: Sri Lanka v Pakistan
- Last women's ODI: 29 January 2002: Sri Lanka v Pakistan
- Only women's T20I: 3 October 2012: Pakistan v South Africa
- As of 3 September 2020; Source: Cricinfo

Moors Sports Club Ground is a first-class cricket ground in Colombo, the home ground of the Moors Sports Club.

== Location ==
The ground is on Muttaiah Road and Braybrooke Place, near Beira Lake and Gangaramaya Temple, about one kilometre from the sea.

== History ==
Moors Sports Club used the ground for many years before the first first-class matches were played there, in 1988-89, when Sri Lanka's domestic competition, the Lakspray Trophy, was granted first-class status. Since then it has been in constant use for first-class, List A and Twenty20 matches. While Moors play their home matches there, other teams also use the ground in Sri Lanka's domestic competitions.

As of early September 2020, 207 first-class matches and 111 List A matches had been played at the ground.

Five women's international matches have been played at the ground, all between Sri Lanka and Pakistan. Two of them took place in 1998, three in 2002. Three matches in the 2000 ICC Under-19 Cricket World Cup were played at the ground.

== Records ==
The highest first-class score on the ground is 300 not out by Ramesh Mendis for Moors against Negombo in 2019-20. The best bowling figures are 9 for 38 by Manjula Munasinghe for Western Province North against Central Province in 1993-94.
