= List of Ace Capital Cricket Club players =

List of first-class cricketers by club

This is an incomplete list in alphabetical order of cricketers who have played for Ace Capital Cricket Club in top-class (Note: Top-class matches are first-class, List A, and Twenty20.) matches since the club initially achieved first-class status in 2012 (then known as Sri Lanka Ports Authority Cricket Club).

== Key ==
- † preceding a player's name means that the original article is now a redirect to this list.

== A ==
- H. T. L. Abeysinghe (2025)
- R. K. Amameth (2026)
- A. M. E. M. Amarasinghe (2025)
- D. T. G. Amarasinghe (2024)
- S. Ashan (2024-2024/25)
- N. H. Atharagalla (2021/22-2026)

== D ==
- Shanuka Dissanayake

== K ==
- Shantha Kalavitigoda
- Chanaka Komasaru

== M ==
- Gayan Maneshan

== P ==
- Ashan Priyanjan
- Malinda Pushpakumara

== U ==
- Isuru Udana
- Mahela Udawatte
