= Western Province cricket team (disambiguation) =

There is a men's team representing the Western Cape Province in domestic first-class cricket in South Africa by the name of Western Province cricket team. Other teams by that name include:

- Western Province women's cricket team, a female cricket team representing the Western Cape Province in domestic cricket in South Africa.
- Western Province cricket team (Sri Lanka), a defunct cricket team that represented the Western Province of Sri Lanka in domestic first-class cricket in the Inter-Provincial Cricket Tournament.
