= Manjula Munasinghe =

Personal information
- Full name: Arachchige Manjula Nishantha Munasinghe
- Born: 10 December 1971 (age 54); Colombo, Ceylon
- Batting: Right-handed
- Bowling: Right-arm fast-medium
- Role: Bowler

International information
- National side: Sri Lanka (1994–1996)
- ODI debut (cap 79): 14 April 1994 v Australia
- Last ODI: 20 January 1996 v Australia

Domestic team information
- Years: Team
- 1990–1998: Sinhalese SC
- 1992: Western Province South
- 1994: Western Province North

Career statistics
Competition	ODI	FC	LA
Matches	5	33	17
Runs scored	13	464	112
Batting average	4.33	17.84	8.61
100s/50s	0/0	0/2	0/0
Top score	8	59*	23
Balls bowled	217	4,198	680
Wickets	4	99	19
Bowling average	36.50	22.04	21.89
5 wickets in innings	0	5	0
10 wickets in match	0	2	0
Best bowling	3/30	9/38	4/25
Catches/stumpings	0/-	26/-	3/-
- Source: Cricinfo, 23 January 2016

Arachchige Manjula Nishantha Munasinghe (Urdu: منجولا مناسنگھے; born 10 December 1971), best known as Manjula Munasinghe, is a Sri Lankan Australian cricket coach and former cricketer who played five One Day Internationals (ODIs) between 1994 and 1996. He currently lives in Australia.

== Domestic career ==
Born in Colombo, Munasinghe made his first-class debut for the Sinhalese Sports Club during the 1990–91 season. He first played for Sri Lanka "A" during the 1992–93 season in a quadrangular tournament also involving Bangladesh "A", India "A", and Pakistan "A".

Munasinghe did not play for Sri Lanka, but remained active domestically until the 1997–98 season. His best first-class bowling figures came in February 1994, when he took 9/38 in the first innings of Western Province North's match against Central Province.

== International career ==
Munasinghe made his ODI debut for the Sri Lankan national cricket team during the 1994 edition of the Austral-Asia Cup in the United Arab Emirates, playing a single match. He did not play internationally again until the 1995–96 Benson & Hedges World Series Cup, held in Australia, where he played four matches as a right-arm fast bowler.

== After cricket ==
After the conclusion of his playing career, Munasinghe emigrated to Melbourne, Australia, firstly working with the Victorian Cricket Association as a junior coach. In 2006, he established the Aus–Lanka Cricket Academy in Rowville which was intended to provide cricket coaching for children of immigrants.
