= Sanjaya Gangodawila =

Sri Lankan cricketer (born 1984)

Personal information
- Full name: Gangodawila Appuhamilage Sanjaya Kumara Gangodawila
- Born: 20 June 1984 (age 42); Colombo, Sri Lanka
- Batting: Left-handed
- Bowling: Right-arm medium fast
- Role: All-rounder

Domestic team information
- Years: Team
- 2006–2015: Bloomfield Cricket and Athletic Club
- Kandurata cricket team
- Basnahira cricket team

Career statistics
Competition	FC	LA	T20
Matches	53	52	15
Runs scored	2223	857	89
Batting average	28.87	25.96	7.41
100s/50s	2/15	0/2	0/0
Top score	113	77	23
Balls bowled	480	354	90
Wickets	12	14	12
Bowling average	28.25	23.28	20.00
5 wickets in innings	1	1	0
10 wickets in match	0	0	0
Best bowling	5/64	5/25	1/12
Catches/stumpings	37/–	26/–	8/–
- Source: Cricinfo, 13 May 2018

Gangodawila Appuhamilage Sanjaya Kumara Gangodawila (born 20 June 1984) is a Sri Lankan cricketer who played for Bloomfield Cricket and Athletic Club, Kandurata cricket team and for the Basnahira cricket team in 53 First-class cricket matches, 52 List A cricket matches and 15 T20 cricket matches between 2006 and 2015.

He was bought by the Basnahira Cricket Dundee team in the 2012 Sri Lanka Premier League draft for the inaugural edition of the Sri Lankan Premier League in 2012. But he didn't feature in any of the matches as Basnahira Cricket Dundee failed to reach the semi-finals.
