= Ruhuna cricket team =

Sri Lankan provincial cricket team

Ruhuna Elevens
- One Day name: Ruhuna elevens

Personnel
- Captain: Mahela Udawatte

Team information
- Colors: Red Blue
- Founded: 1990
- Home ground: Galle International Stadium
- Capacity: 35,000

History
- First-class debut: Wayamba in 1990 at Galle International Stadium
- IP FC wins: none
- IP LO wins: none
- IP T20 wins: 1 (2011)
- Official website: Sri Lanka Cricket

Ruhuna cricket team was one of the five provincial cricket teams that took part in Sri Lankan Inter-Provincial Tournament, representing Southern Province. The Ruhuna cricket team was based in Galle. It drew cricketers from Sri Lanka Premier Trophy. Team colors were red and blue. Ruhuna cricket team took part in all three provincial tournaments: the first-class cricket competition known as the Inter-Provincial First Class Tournament, the List A competition known as the Inter-Provincial Limited Over Tournament and the Twenty20 competition known as the Inter-Provincial Twenty20.

Ruhuna cricket team had participated in every tournament since the inauguration of the tournament since 1990. Despite the team having been represented by many formidable international and national cricketers the team still to win a title in the Inter-Provincial tournament. Ruhuna was beaten by Wayamba cricket team in 2007–08 Inter-Provincial Twenty20 by 31 runs in the finals, the only time the team qualified for the tournament final. They however won the 2011 Inter-Provincial Twenty20 (by defeating Wayamba Wolves in the final). That first title led to their qualification for the 2011 Champions League Twenty20 qualifying rounds. Ruhuna Rhinos will play the qualifying round in Champions League Twenty20 in 2011 under the captaincy of Mahela Udawatte. In the qualifying round, they managed a 4-run win over the Leicestershire Foxes, but they missed out on the tournament proper to Indian franchise Kolkata Knight Riders on net run rate.

In the 2009 Inter-Provincial Tournament even though Ruhuna's Upul Tharanga scored his maiden first-class double century, it was not sufficient to them qualify for the semi-finals. Basnahira South defeat Ruhuna by 4 wickets. In the 2009 Inter-Provincial Twenty20 tournament's second semi-finals, Wayamba cricket team beat the Ruhuna in the bowl-out to reach the finals, after the match was affected by rain. Eventually Wayamba went on to win the title, becoming the first team won the title twice.

== Name ==
From the inauguration of the Inter-Provincial Tournament in 1990 teams were named in English. As a result, the cricket team of the Southern Province was known as Southern province. After a ten-year hiatus, the tournament was revived in 2003–04, with Sinhalese names given to the five teams, resulting in its renaming as the Ruhuna cricket team. It was named after Kingdom of Ruhuna, one of the ancient kingdom in Sri Lanka, the capital of which was situated in Southern Province.

== History ==
=== Early years (1990–2000) ===
Sri Lanka Cricket fearing that Club cricket alone would not be enough to keep Sri Lankan cricket competitive, the Inter-Provincial Cricket Tournament was created as a domestic first-class cricket tournament in Sri Lanka in 1990. From the inauguration of the tournament, in 1990, participating teams varied from year to year. The tournament started with four provincial teams. They were Western Province, Central Province, North Western Province and Ruhuna.

In the first first-class Inter-provincial tournament, which was called the 1990 Singer Inter-Provincial Trophy, Ruhuna, then called Southern Province, captained by Upul Sumathipala, had come third out of the four provinces, losing one out of three of their matches and finishing the tournament with 10.1 points. Western Province went on to win the tournament, not losing a game.

=== Establishment of Twenty20 (2000–2010) ===
With the establishment of Twenty20 cricket in 2003, it came to Sri Lanka in 2004 as the Twenty20 Tournament, however this was replaced with the Inter-Provincial Twenty20 in 2008. Wayamba won the 2007–08 Inter-Provincial Twenty20, which was the first edition of the tournament. They had won four out of five matches in the group stage and eventually won their way into the finals with Ruhuna. Wayamba won by 31 runs.

== Grounds and Sponsorship ==
Galle International Stadium
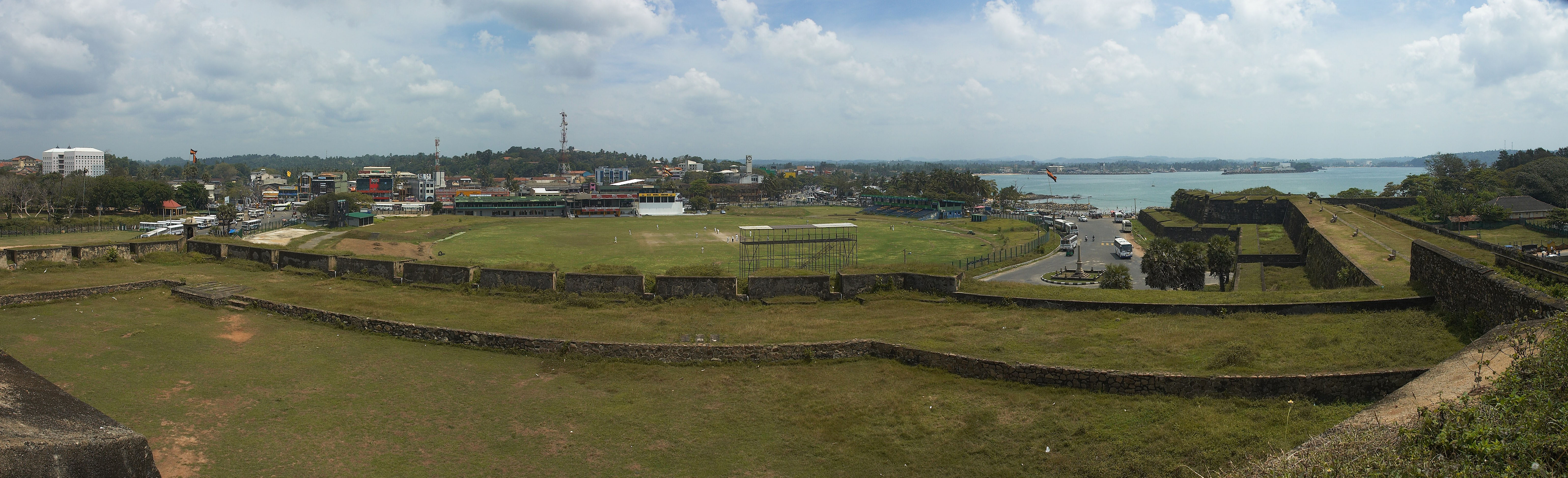
- Location: Galle, Southern Province, Sri Lanka

Construction
- Opened: 1876

Tenant
- Ruhuna cricket team (1990–present)

Galle International Stadium in Galle is the home ground of Ruhuna team. It is a cricket stadium in Galle, Sri Lanka, situated near the Galle fort and fringed on two sides by the Indian Ocean. It is considered to be one of the most picturesque cricket grounds in the world. Before being brought up to international cricket standards, it was known as 'The Esplanade', and is the home ground of the Galle cricket club.

Hirdaramani, one of Sri Lanka's apparel industrial companies is the team sponsor.

== Players ==
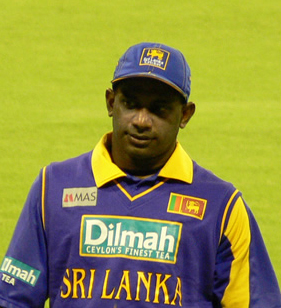
Sanath Jayasuriya one of the most experienced players in the side

Sanath Jayasuriya, one of the most experienced players in the contemporary international cricket is the captain of the team. Number of Southern province-born cricketers present the team such as Sanath Jayasuriya, Champaka Ramanayake, Lasith Malinga and Upul Tharanga. The top 75 players from the Premier Limited Overs Tournament selected for the Inter-Provincial tournament.

=== 2011 squad ===
Players with international caps are listed in bold.

No.	Name	Nat	Birth date	Batting style	Bowling style	Notes
Batsmen
4	Bhanuka Rajapaksa	(Sri Lanka)	24 October 1991	Left-handed	Right arm medium	
6	**Mahela Udawatte**	(Sri Lanka)	19 July 1986	Left-handed	Right arm off break	Captain
21	Amal Athulathmudali	(Sri Lanka)	21 January 1987	Left-handed	Right arm fast-medium	
?	Yashodha Lanka	(Sri Lanka)	1 October 1992	Right-handed	Left arm medium-fast	
All-rounders
5	Tillakaratne Sampath	(Sri Lanka)	23 June 1982	Right-handed	Right arm off break	
7	**Sanath Jayasuriya**	(Sri Lanka)	30 June 1969	Left-handed	Slow left-arm orthodox	
9	Chinthaka Perera	(Sri Lanka)	14 February 1985	Right-handed	Right arm fast-medium	
14	Shalika Karunanayake	(Sri Lanka)	14 February 1987	Right-handed	Right arm fast-medium	
23	Janaka Gunaratne	(Sri Lanka)	14 March 1981	Right-handed	Right arm off break	
34	Milinda Siriwardana	(Sri Lanka)	4 December 1985	Left-handed	Slow left-arm orthodox	
69	Arosh Janoda	(Sri Lanka)	11 September 1987	Right-handed	Right arm medium-fast	
Wicket-keepers
8	**Kusal Perera**	(Sri Lanka)	17 August 1990	Left-handed		
17	**Dinesh Chandimal**	(Sri Lanka)	18 November 1989	Right-handed	–	
44	**Upul Tharanga**	(Sri Lanka)	2 February 1985	Left-handed	–	
Bowlers
2	Omesh Wijesiriwardene	(Sri Lanka)	10 March 1983	Right-handed	Right arm fast-medium	
24	Shihan Kamileen	(Sri Lanka)	30 September 1990	Right-handed	Right arm off break	
28	Alankara Silva	(Sri Lanka)	4 April 1985	Right-handed	Right arm off break	

Source: Ruhuna

=== Notable players ===
The following is a list of players who have represented both Ruhuna and Sri Lanka.

- (Sri Lanka) Sanath Jayasuriya
- (Sri Lanka) Marvan Atapattu
- (Sri Lanka) Champaka Ramanayake
- (Sri Lanka) Jayananda Warnaweera
- (Sri Lanka) Indika de Saram
- (Sri Lanka) Pramodya Wickramasinghe
- (Sri Lanka) Upul Chandana
- (Sri Lanka) Janak Gamage
- (Sri Lanka) Saman Jayantha
- (Sri Lanka) Athula Samarasekera
- (Sri Lanka) Chamara Silva
- (Sri Lanka) Prasanna Jayawardene
- (Sri Lanka) Charitha Buddhika
- (Sri Lanka) Lasith Malinga
- (Sri Lanka) Malinga Bandara
- (Sri Lanka) Dammika Prasad
- (Sri Lanka) Hemantha Wickramaratne
- (Sri Lanka) Indika Gallage
- (Sri Lanka) Upul Tharanga
- (Sri Lanka) Dilhara Lokuhettige
- (Sri Lanka) Sujeewa de Silva

== Honours ==
=== Domestic ===
==== First Class ====
- Inter-Provincial First Class Tournament: 0

==== List A ====
- Inter-Provincial Limited Over Tournament: 0

==== Twenty20 ====
- Inter-Provincial Twenty20: 1

2011 Inter-Provincial Twenty20
