= Inter-Provincial Limited Over Tournament =

- Countries: Sri Lanka
- Administrator: Sri Lanka Cricket
- Format: Limited overs cricket
- First edition: 2008
- Tournament format: Round-robin tournament and knockout
- Number of teams: 5
- Current champion: Kandurata elevens
- Most successful: Kandurata elevens (3 titles)
- Website: Sri Lanka Cricket

Inter-Provincial Limited Over Tournament was a domestic Limited overs cricket competition in Sri Lanka held by Sri Lanka Cricket. It is a part of their Inter-Provincial Cricket Tournament program. From 2008 the Inter-Provincial Limited Over Tournament became the mainstream domestic List A competition in Sri Lanka, with the Premier Limited Overs Tournament being the other, which is played between the clubs in Sri Lanka. Kandurata elevens has won all three tournaments with the first one being shared with Wayamba elevens.

== History ==
=== Inaugural season ===
Kandurata elevens and Wayamba elevens met in the Final, however the match ended up in a No Result.

=== Second season ===
Kandurata elevens wins their second Inter-Provincial Limited Over Tournament.

=== Third season ===
2011 hosted the third season of the Inter-Provincial Limited Over Tournament. It was a shorter tournament compared to the previous one with only 13 matches, and most of them being held at the Sinhalese Sports Club Ground with all three finals at the upgraded R. Premadasa Stadium in Colombo. This edition also featured the Uva cricket team's debut in the limited overs tournament of the Inter-Provincial Cricket Tournament, having previously featured in the Inter-Provincial First Class Tournament. This season also saw the introduction of the Basnahira cricket team with the merger of Basnahira North and Basnahira South cricket teams. It was the first time five different teams represented five different provinces in the tournament.

== Teams ==
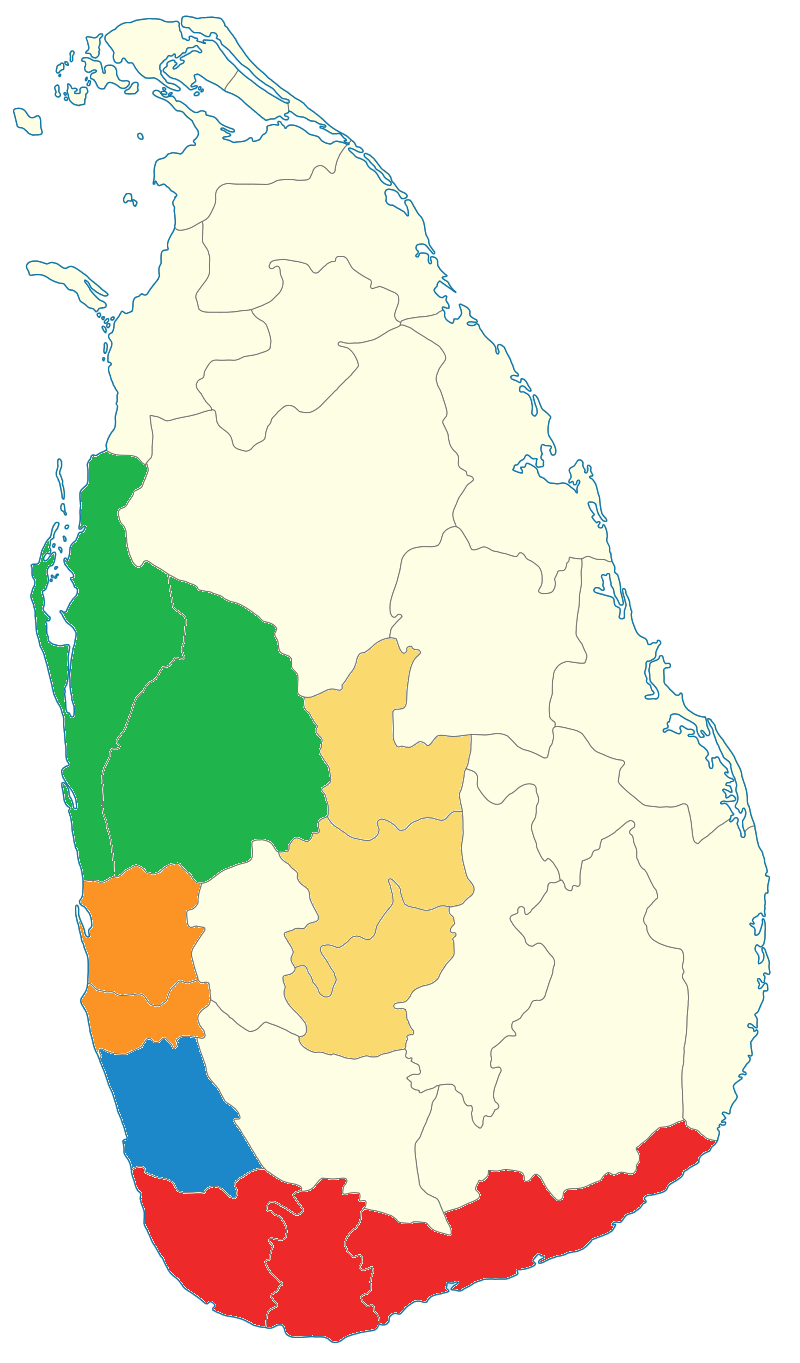
Inter-Provincial teams.

Team	Province	Home ground	Inaugural season	Final season	Wins	2nds
Kandurata elevens	Central Province	Pallekele International Cricket Stadium	2007–08	2010–11	2	0
Wayamba elevens	North Western Province	Welagedara Stadium	2007–08	2010–11	1	0
Ruhuna elevens	Southern Province	Galle International Stadium	2007–08	2010–11	0	1
Basnahira elevens	Western Province	Sinhalese Sports Club Ground	2010–11	2010–11	0	0
Uva elevens	Uva	—	2010–11	2010–11	0	0
Basnahira South elevens	Western Province South	Sinhalese Sports Club Ground	2007–08	2009–10	0	0
Basnahira North elevens	Western Province North	R. Premadasa Stadium	2007–08	2009–10	0	0
Sri Lanka Cricket Combined XI	—	—	2009–10	2009–10	0	0

== Winners ==
Year	Final Venue	Man of the tournament	Final		
Year	Final Venue	Man of the tournament	Winner	Result	Runner-up
2007–08; Details	R. Premadasa Stadium	Kumar Sangakkara	Kandurata elevens 131/5 (29.3 overs); Wayamba elevens 37/0 (6 overs)	No result (D/L method) Scorecard	
2009–10; Details	Tyronne Fernando Stadium	Kaushalya Weeraratne	Kandurata elevens 264/7 (49.1 overs)	Kandurata won by 3 wickets Scorecard	Ruhuna elevens 263/7 (50 overs)
2010–11; Details	R. Premadasa Stadium	Kumar Sangakkara (Note: Was named Player of the match for the final.)	Kandurata elevens 255/6 (50 overs)	Kandurata won by 53 runs Scorecard	Basnahira elevens 172 (41.3 overs)

=== Competition placings ===
Season	Winner	Runner-up	Third	Fourth	Fifth	Sixth
2007–08	Kandurata	Wayamba	Basnahira North	Basnahira South	Ruhuna	
2009–10	Kandurata	Ruhuna	Wayamba	Basnahira North	Basnahira South	Sri Lanka Cricket Combined XI
2010–11	Kandurata	Basnahira	Wayamba	Ruhuna	Uva	

== See also ==
- Premier Limited Overs Tournament
