= Basnahira South cricket team =

Basnahira South
- One Day name: Basnahira South elevens

Personnel
- Captain: Chamara Silva

Team information
- Founded: Western Province; 1990-1991; Basnahira South; 1992-2010; Basnahira; 2011
- Home ground: Sinhalese Sports Club Ground & Tyronne Fernando Stadium
- Capacity: 10,000

History
- First-class debut: vs North Western Province in 1992 at Welagedara Stadium
- IP FC wins: none
- IP LO wins: none
- IP T20 wins: none
- Official website: Sri Lanka Cricket

Basnahira South cricket team is one of the five provincial cricket teams which make up the Sri Lankan domestic cricket structure representing southern region of Western province. Basnahira South is based in Colombo.The cricket team participate in the two provincial tournaments: the first-class cricket competition known as the Inter-Provincial Tournament, and the Twenty20 competition known as the Inter-Provincial Twenty20. They also participated in the 2007/08 Inter-Provincial Limited Overs Tournament. The tournament is defunct now. The top 75 players of the Premier Limited Overs Tournament take part in the Inter-Provincial tournament.

The team plays their home matches in Colombo Sinhalese Sports Club Ground and Tyronne Fernando Stadium in Moratuwa. Tillakaratne Dilshan is the captain of the side. Prasanna Jayawardene, Malinda Warnapura and Chamara Silva are some of the other current Test cricketers in the side.

== 2008/09 season ==
Basnahira South did not qualify for this year's finals Inter-Provincial Tournament. Although they did better in the Inter-Provincial Twenty20 tournament. They had the chance to qualify for the inaugural Twenty20 Champions League. Despite entering the finals unbeaten Basnhira South, collapsed from a strong position of 133 for 1, losing their last nine wickets for just eleven runs. Wayamba chased down the target with six balls remaining and qualified for the Twenty20 Champions League.

== Name and participation ==
From the early years of the Inter-Provincial tournament to 2004/05 season teams used English names. But from 2007/08 onwards the teams were named in Sinhalese. From its inception of the tournament Western Province presented more than one team to the tournament except for 2003/04 and 2004/05 seasons. Since then Western province teams became known as Basnahira North and Basnahira South. Basnahira is Sinhalese for West. Number of teams representing Western province varied from season to season and their names also. Teams represented Western Province for the each tournament given below.

Team	Season										
Team	1990	1990/91	1992	1993/94	1994/95	2003/04	2004/05	2007/08	2008/09	2009/10	2010/11
Western Province	Western Province	City, Suburbs	Suburbs, North, South	City, North, South		Western Province		North, South			Basnahira

== Notable players ==
The following is a list of players who have represented both Basnahira South and Sri Lanka.

- (Sri Lanka) Chaminda Mendis
- (Sri Lanka) Asanka Gurusinha
- (Sri Lanka) Arjuna Ranatunga
- (Sri Lanka) Marvan Atapattu
- (Sri Lanka) Sanjeeva Ranatunga
- (Sri Lanka) Romesh Kaluwitharana
- (Sri Lanka) Nishantha Ranatunga
- (Sri Lanka) Manjula Munasinghe
- (Sri Lanka) Pramodya Wickramasinghe
- (Sri Lanka) Pulasthi Gunaratne
- (Sri Lanka) Tillakaratne Dilshan
- (Sri Lanka) Dulip Samaraweera
- (Sri Lanka) Hemantha Wickramaratne
- (Sri Lanka) Dulip Liyanage
- (Sri Lanka) Gamini Perera
- (Sri Lanka) Sajeewa de Silva
- (Sri Lanka) Jayantha Silva
- (Sri Lanka) Ravindra Pushpakumara
- (Sri Lanka) Don Anurasiri
- (Sri Lanka) Dilruwan Perera
- (Sri Lanka) Prasanna Jayawardene
- (Sri Lanka) Hasantha Fernando
- (Sri Lanka) Chamara Silva
- (Sri Lanka) Malinda Warnapura
- (Sri Lanka) Malinga Bandara
- (Sri Lanka) Nuwan Zoysa
- (Sri Lanka) Ruchira Perera
- (Sri Lanka) Lahiru Thirimanne

== Current squad ==
The squad for the 2008–09 season as of 22 March 2009.

Basnahira South current squad
Players
Coaches

Nat.	Name	Age	Pos.	Bat st.	Bowl st.
(Sri Lanka)	Tillakaratne Dilshan (Captain)	32	All-rounder	RHB	OS
(Sri Lanka)	Chamara Silva	29	Batsman	RHB	LS
(Sri Lanka)	Malinga Bandara	29	Bowler	RHB	LS
(Sri Lanka)	Charith Sylvester	26	Wicket keeper	LHB
(Sri Lanka)	Hasantha Fernando	29	All-rounder	RHB	RMF
(Sri Lanka)	Janaka Gunaratne	28	All-rounder	RHB	OS
(Sri Lanka)	Prasanna Jayawardene	29	Wicket keeper	RHB
(Sri Lanka)	Suranga Lakmal	22	Bowler	RHB	RMF
(Sri Lanka)	Chinthaka Perera	24	Bowler	RHB	RFM
(Sri Lanka)	Dilruwan Perera	26	Bowler	RHB	OS
(Sri Lanka)	Gihan Rupasinghe	23	Batsman	LHB	LS
(Sri Lanka)	Milinda Siriwardana	23	All-rounder	LHB	LO
(Sri Lanka)	Lahiru Thirimanne	19	Batsman	LHB	RMF
(Sri Lanka)	Malinda Warnapura	29	Batsman	LHB	OS

== Honours ==
- Inter-Provincial Tournament
- Inter-Provincial Limited Overs Tournament
- Inter-Provincial Twenty20
