= Kandurata cricket team =

Kandurata Elevens
Personnel
- Captain: Kumar Sangakkara

Team information
- Founded: 1990
- Home ground: Pallekele International Cricket Stadium
- Capacity: 35,000

History
- First-class debut: vs Western Province in 1990 at Singhalese Sports Club Cricket Ground
- IP FC wins: 2 (2003–04, 2004–05)
- IP LO wins: 2 (2007–08, 2009–10)
- IP T20 wins: none
- Official website: Sri Lanka Cricket

Kandurata cricket team was a Sri Lankan first class cricket team based in Kandy, that represented Central Province of Sri Lanka. Kandurata competed in all three provincial tournaments:the first class cricket competition known as the Inter-Provincial First Class Tournament, the List A cricket competition known as the Inter-Provincial Limited Over Tournament and the Twenty20 competition known as the Inter-Provincial Twenty20.

Kandurata is the current champion of Inter-Provincial Limited Over Tournament, and has won title in 2010–11, 2009–10, and the joint title in 2007–08 series. In 2007/08 Inter-provincial Limited overs tournament, Kandurata reached the finals by winning all their round robin matches, but the game was washed out due to rain.

== Name ==
From the commence of Inter-Provincial Cricket Tournament, the team representing Central Province is known as Central province team. But from the 2007/08 season, the team known as "Kandurata" team. "Kandurata" is Sinhala for "Hill country". The hills or central highlands are mainly situated in central province.

== History ==
=== Early years (1990–2000) ===
Sri Lanka Cricket fearing that Club cricket alone would not be enough to keep Sri Lankan cricket competitive, the Inter-Provincial Cricket Tournament was created as a domestic first-class cricket tournament in Sri Lanka in 1990. From the inauguration of the tournament, in 1990, participating teams varied from year to year. The tournament started with four provincial teams. They were Western Province, Southern Province, North Western Province and Kandurata.

In the first first-class Inter-provincial tournament, which was called the 1990 Singer Inter-Provincial Trophy, Kandurata, then called Central Province, captained by J.R.Ratnayeke, had come second out of the four provinces, losing none but second to Western Province on points, with 11.4. Western Province went on to win the tournament, not losing a game.

=== Establishment of Twenty20 (2000–2010) ===
With the establishment of Twenty20 cricket in 2003, it came to Sri Lanka in 2004 as the Twenty20 Tournament, however this was replaced with the Inter-Provincial Twenty20 in 2008. Wayamba won the 2007–08 Inter-Provincial Twenty20, which was the first edition of the tournament. They had won four out of five matches in the group stage and eventually won their way into the finals with Ruhuna. Wayamba won by 31 runs.

== Grounds and Sponsorship ==
Pallekele International Cricket Stadium
- PICS
- Full name: Muttiah Muralitharan International Cricket Stadium
- Location: Pallekele, Kandy District, Central Province
- Owner: Sri Lanka Cricket
- Capacity: 35,000

Construction
- Opened: 2009

Tenant
- Kandurata cricket team (1990–present)

The team's home ground was Asgiriya Stadium, in Kandy. Which was later changed to Pallekele International Cricket Stadium once it was fully constructed.

Pallekele International Cricket Stadium is one of the newest cricket stadiums in Sri Lanka and the newest in the city of Kandy. The stadium was declared opened on 27 November 2009. The stadium is located about a half-hour drive from Kandy. The Pallekele stadium is wholly owned by Sri Lanka Cricket and is set to displace the Asgiriya Stadium, which has hosted Tests from 1983 to 2007, as the international venue of choice around Kandy. The stadium was built by the State Engineering Corporation of Sri Lanka and is designed along the lines of SuperSport Park in Centurion, South Africa.

Mas Holdings, a Sri Lankan apparel industrial firm is the team's sponsor.

== Players ==
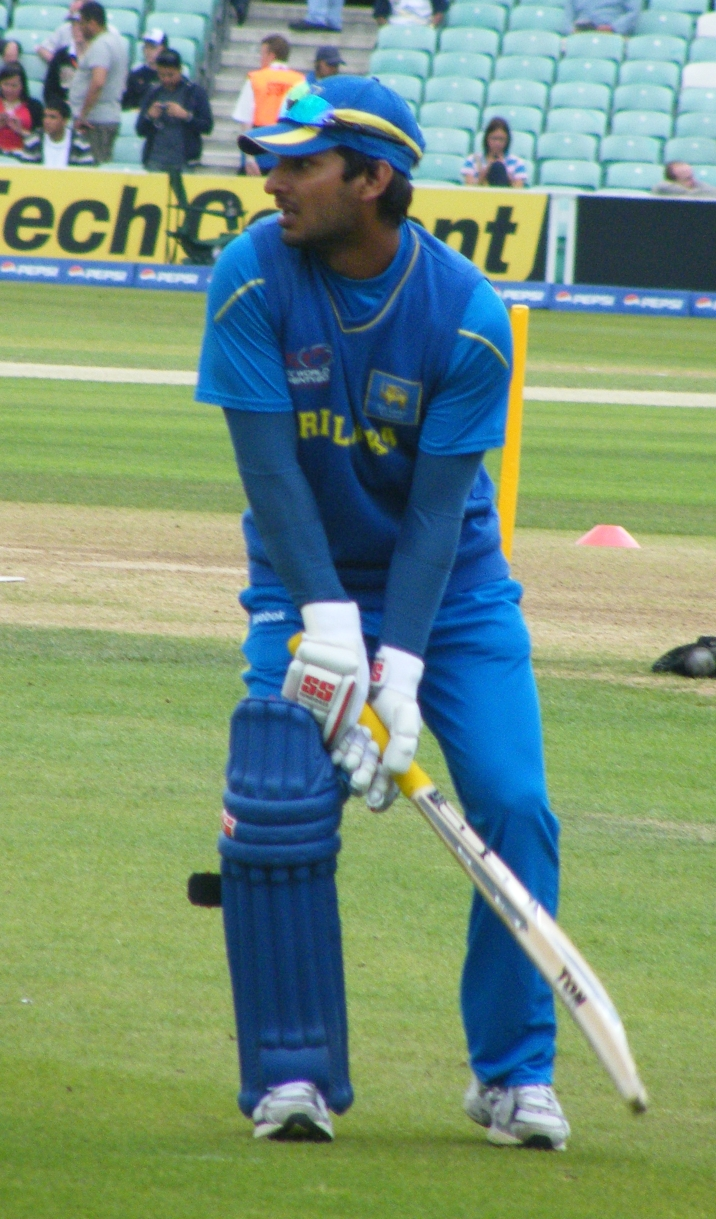
Kumar Sangakkara of Kandurata Elevens.

Kandurata has some reputed Test cricket players such as Kumar Sangakkara and Muttiah Muralitharan. Unlike in India and Australia, where cricketers represent their home province or state, it is the norm in Sri Lanka for outside cricketers to play for another province in Inter-Provincial Tournament. This is because uneven distribution of cricketer population among provinces. Therefore, it resulted in players like Nishantha Ranatunga and Sanjeeva Ranatunga from Western Province, where the most cricketing population occurs, playing in Kandurata or Central Province.

=== Current squad ===
Players with Test caps are listed in bold. One Day International caps in italics.

| No. | Name | Nat | Birth date | Batting style | Bowling style | Notes |
Batsmen
| 104 | **Chamara Kapugedera** | (Sri Lanka) | 24 February 1987 (age 39) | Right-handed | Right arm medium pace | |
| 145 | **Jeewan Mendis** | (Sri Lanka) | 15 January 1983 (age 43) | Left-handed | Right arm leg break | |
| 111 | **Tharanga Paranavitana** | (Sri Lanka) | 15 April 1982 (age 44) | Left-handed | Right arm off break | |
| — | Indika Senaratne | (Sri Lanka) | 15 February 1986 (age 40) | Right-handed | Right arm off break | |
| — | Kanchana Gunawardene | (Sri Lanka) | 9 October 1984 (age 42) | Left-handed | Right arm off break | |
All-rounders
| **31** | **Chinthaka Jayasinghe** | (Sri Lanka) | 19 May 1978 (age 48) | Right-handed | Right arm medium pace | T20i Representative only |
| 24 | **Suresh Perera** | (Sri Lanka) | 16 February 1978 (age 48) | Right-handed | Right arm fast-medium | |
| 3 | **Thilan Samaraweera** | (Sri Lanka) | 22 September 1976 (age 50) | Right-handed | Right arm fast-medium | |
| 97 | **Thilan Thushara** | (Sri Lanka) | 1 March 1981 (age 45) | Left-handed | Left arm medium-fast | |
| 104 | **Kaushalya Weeraratne** | (Sri Lanka) | 29 January 1981 (age 45) | Left-handed | Right arm medium-fast | |
| — | GASK Gangodawila | (Sri Lanka) | 20 June 1984 (age 42) | Left-handed | Right arm fast | |
Wicket-keepers
| 84 | **Kumar Sangakkara** | (Sri Lanka) | 27 October 1977 (age 48) | Left-handed | – | Club captain |
Bowlers
| 54 | **Muttiah Muralitharan** | (Sri Lanka) | 17 April 1972 (age 54) | Right-handed | Right arm off break | |
| 98 | **Dilhara Fernando** | (Sri Lanka) | 19 July 1979 (age 47) | Right-handed | Right arm fast-medium | |
| — | Chaminda Vidanapathirana | (Sri Lanka) | 25 January 1983 (age 43) | Right-handed | Right arm fast-medium | |
| — | **Seekkuge Prasanna** | (Sri Lanka) | 27 June 1985 (age 41) | Right-handed | Right arm leg break | |

- Source: Kandurata cricket team
- Source: http://www.espncricinfo.com/srilanka/content/player/caps.html?country=8;class=1

=== Notable players ===
The following is a list of notable players who have represented both Kandurata and Sri Lanka.

- (Sri Lanka) Roshan Mahanama
- (Sri Lanka) Brendon Kuruppu
- (Sri Lanka) Ravi Ratnayeke
- (Sri Lanka) Sanjeeva Ranatunga
- (Sri Lanka) Nishantha Ranatunga
- (Sri Lanka) Lalithamana Fernando
- (Sri Lanka) Ruwan Kalpage
- (Sri Lanka) Piyal Wijetunge
- (Sri Lanka) Nilantha Ratnayake
- (Sri Lanka) Muttiah Muralitharan
- (Sri Lanka) Ashley de Silva
- (Sri Lanka) Pubudu Dassanayake
- (Sri Lanka) Kumar Sangakkara
- (Sri Lanka) Tharanga Paranavitana
- (Sri Lanka) Thilan Samaraweera
- (Sri Lanka) Thilina Kandamby
- (Sri Lanka) Kaushalya Weeraratne
- (Sri Lanka) Nuwan Zoysa
- (Sri Lanka) Ruchira Perera
- (Sri Lanka) Hasantha Fernando
- (Sri Lanka) Dilruwan Perera
- (Sri Lanka) Dilhara Lokuhettige
- (Sri Lanka) Chamara Kapugedera
- (Sri Lanka) Akalanka Ganegama
- (Sri Lanka) Thilan Thushara
- (Sri Lanka) Dharshana Gamage
- (Sri Lanka) Suresh Perera
- (Sri Lanka) Dilhara Fernando

== Honours ==
=== Domestic ===
==== First Class ====
- Inter-Provincial First Class Tournament: 1

2003–04

==== List A ====
- Inter-Provincial Limited Over Tournament: 2

2007–08, 2009–10

==== Twenty20 ====
- Inter-Provincial Twenty20: 0
