= Indika Senaratne =

Sri Lankan cricketer (born 1986)

Personal information
- Full name: Makulpagodagedara Indika Gihan Senaratne
- Born: 5 February 1986 (age 40); Gampola, Sri Lanka
- Source: Cricinfo, 29 October 2020

Indika Senaratne (born 5 February 1986) is a Sri Lankan cricketer. He played domestic cricket for Burgher Recreation Club and Ragama Cricket Club from 2006 to 2010, before playing for Central Districts in New Zealand in 2015/16.
