= Muthumudalige Pushpakumara =

Sri Lankan cricketer and coach (born 1981)

Personal information
- Full name: Muthumudalige Pushpakumara
- Born: 26 September 1981 (age 45); Colombo, Sri Lanka
- Height: 5 ft 9 in (175 cm)
- Batting: Left-handed
- Bowling: Right-arm off break

International information
- National side: Sri Lanka (2009–2010)
- ODI debut (cap 142): 27 December 2009 v India
- Last ODI: 5 January 2010 v India
- Only T20I (cap 32): 9 December 2009 v India

Domestic team information
- Years: Team
- 2008–2009: Basnahira North
- 2007–present: Tamil Union Cricket and Athletic Club
- 2000–2007: Colts Cricket Club

Career statistics
| Competition | ODI | T20I | FC | LA |
|---|---|---|---|---|
| Matches | 3 | 1 | 102 | 95 |
| Runs scored | 7 | – | 3,866 | 1,176 |
| Batting average | – | – | 28.42 | 21.00 |
| 100s/50s | 0/0 | – | 4/24 | 0/4 |
| Top score | 7* | – | 114 | 55 |
| Balls bowled | 30 | 18 | 11,931 | 3,463 |
| Wickets | 0 | 1 | 246 | 90 |
| Bowling average | – | 27.00 | 25.22 | 26.81 |
| 5 wickets in innings | – | 0 | 5 | 0 |
| 10 wickets in match | – | 0 | 0 | 0 |
| Best bowling | – | 1/27 | 6/62 | 3/10 |
| Catches/stumpings | 0/– | 1/– | 109/1 | 44/– |
- Source: CricInfo, 10 January 2010

Muthumudalige Pushpakumara (born 26 September 1981) is a Sri Lankan cricket coach and former international player. A left-handed batsman and right-arm off break bowler, he played three One Day International (ODI) and one Twenty20 International (T20I) matches for the Sri Lanka national cricket team between 2009 and 2010.

== Early life ==
Pushpakumara studied at Ananda College, Colombo.

== International career ==
He made his One Day International (ODI) debut in late 2009 against India, which was abandoned because of dangerous pitch. Pushpakumara made his only T20I appearance in the same tour in India, where Sri Lanka won the match by 29 runs.

== Coaching career ==
Pushpakumara was appointed head coach of the Kuwait national cricket team in 2019. He was additionally appointed spin bowling coach of the Jaffna Kings for the 2021 Lanka Premier League.
