= Malinga Bandara =

Sri Lankan cricketer

Personal information
- Full name: Herath Mudiyanselage Charitha Malinga Bandara
- Born: 31 December 1979 (age 46); Kalutara, Sri Lanka
- Batting: Right-handed
- Bowling: Right arm leg break

International information
- National side: Sri Lanka (1998–2010)
- Test debut (cap 71): 27 May 1998 v New Zealand
- Last Test: 3 April 2006 v Pakistan
- ODI debut (cap 127): 6 January 2006 v New Zealand
- Last ODI: 8 January 2010 v Bangladesh
- ODI shirt no.: 72
- T20I debut (cap 6): 26 December 2006 v New Zealand
- Last T20I: 4 September 2009 v New Zealand

Domestic team information
- Years: Team
- 1996/97: Kalutara
- 1998/99–2002/03: Nondescripts
- 2003/04: Tamil Union
- 2004/05: Galle
- 2005: Gloucestershire
- 2006/07–2014/15: Ragama
- 2007/08–2009/10: Basnahira South
- 2010: Kent
- 2010/11: Uva
- 2011: Wayamba

Career statistics
Competition	Test	ODI	FC	LA
Matches	8	31	190	177
Runs scored	124	160	4,304	1,401
Batting average	15.50	12.30	20.01	17.96
100s/50s	0/0	0/0	1/16	0/3
Top score	43	31	108	64
Balls bowled	1,152	1,470	26,573	7,758
Wickets	16	36	570	245
Bowling average	39.56	34.22	25.43	24.46
5 wickets in innings	0	0	22	4
10 wickets in match	0	0	2	0
Best bowling	3/84	4/31	8/49	5/22
Catches/stumpings	4/–	9/–	129/–	50/–
Medal record
Men's Cricket
Representing Sri Lanka
ICC Cricket World Cup
Runner-up	2007 West Indies
- Source: Cricinfo, 21 March 2020

Herath Mudiyanselage Charitha Malinga Bandara (born 31 December 1979), commonly known as Malinga Bandara, is a Sri Lankan former international cricketer. He played as a right-handed batsman who bowled leg breaks. He studied at the Kalutara Vidyalaya. He was a part of the Sri Lankan team which finished as runners-up at the 2007 Cricket World Cup.

== Domestic career ==
In Sri Lankan domestic cricket, Bandara played for a variety of teams. Having spent the previous two summers at Normandy CC of the Surrey Championship, turning out in 55 games for the club. He also played county cricket for Gloucestershire during the 2005 season, where he took 45 wickets in eight matches and was so successful he was named Gloucestershire's Player of the Season. He joined Kent County Cricket Club for the 2010 season.

== International career ==
Bandara made his Test debut against New Zealand in 1998 but performed poorly and was subsequently dropped. A useful performance against England 'A' in March 2005 (securing match-figures of eleven for 126) resulted in a Test recall in December. He finished the three-Test series against India with nine wickets at an average of 32.88.

Bandara made his One Day International (ODI) debut against New Zealand in January 2006 at Wellington and was highly successful in the tournament, taking fourteen wickets at an average of 23.92, a strike rate of 29.20, and an economy rate of 4.90, bettering the team's more famous spin bowler Muttiah Muralitharan. He took his best bowling figures of four for 31 against South Africa in the final VB Series round robin match at the Bellerive Oval, Hobart, on 7 February 2006. This performance ensured Sri Lanka's place in the finals against Australia.

He was subsequently not selected for Pakistan's tour of Sri Lanka in 2005–06 and missed out on the Test series in England in 2006.
