= Chaminda Vidanapathirana =

Sri Lankan cricketer (born 1983)

Chaminda Wijayakumara Vidanapathirana (born January 25, 1983, in Morawake) is a Sri Lankan cricketer. A right-arm fast-medium bowler, he plays for the Singhalese Sports Club and has represented his country at the under-23 level.

== See also ==
- Cricket in Sri Lanka
