= Niroshan Bandaratilleke =

Sri Lankan cricketer (born 1975)

Niroshan Bandaratilleke නිරෝෂන් බණ්ඩාරතිලක
Personal information
- Full name: Mapa Rallalage Chandima Niroshan Bandaratilleke
- Born: 16 May 1975 (age 51); Colombo, Sri Lanka
- Batting: Right-handed
- Bowling: Slow left-arm orthodox

International information
- National side: Sri Lanka (1998–2002)
- Test debut (cap 72): 27 May 1998 v New Zealand
- Last Test: 29 November 2001 v West Indies
- ODI debut (cap 96): 21 June 1998 v New Zealand
- Last ODI: 7 July 1998 v India

Career statistics
Competition	Test	ODI
Matches	7	3
Runs scored	93	–
Batting average	11.62	–
100s/50s	0/0	–
Top score	25	–
Balls bowled	1,722	144
Wickets	23	2
Bowling average	30.34	55.50
5 wickets in innings	1	0
10 wickets in match	0	0
Best bowling	5/36	2/34
Catches/stumpings	0/–	0/–
- Source: Cricinfo, 9 February 2006

Mapa Rallalage Chandima Niroshan Bandaratilleke (born 16 May 1975) is a former Sri Lankan cricketer, who played seven Test matches and three One Day Internationals for the Sri Lanka national cricket team. He played as a right-handed batsman and a left-arm slow bowler.

== Domestic career ==
Bandaratilleke played first-class cricket from 1994 to 2009 for Badureliya Sports Club.

== International career ==
When he played for Sri Lanka his bowling style was praised as a complement to Muttiah Muralitharan. He generally took good advantage of poor wickets, none more so than when he took his career best bowling figures of 9/83 against New Zealand in his second Test of the career.
