= Ian Daniel =

Sri Lankan cricketer (born 1981)

Gerald Ian Daniel (born August 17, 1981) is a Sri Lankan cricketer who plays first class cricket for Sinhalese Sports Club. A right-handed opening batsman, Daniel has appeared consistently for Sri Lanka at junior level starting from his inclusion in the Sri Lanka Under-15 team. He was one of the most successful batsmen in the Under-19 team during the 2000 Youth World Cup where he topped the scoring for his country. In 2003 he was first selected in the Sri Lanka A team and the following year in New Zealand he made 322 runs at 53.66. This effort earned him a spot in the Test squad for the tour of Zimbabwe in 2004, but he remained on the sidelines throughout. He made his Twenty20 debut on 17 August 2004, for Bloomfield Cricket and Athletic Club in the 2004 SLC Twenty20 Tournament.
