= Shanuka Dissanayake =

Sri Lankan cricketer (born 1977)

Personal information
- Born: 10 May 1977 (age 49); Ragama, Sri Lanka
- Source: Cricinfo, 30 January 2016

Shanuka Dissanayake (born 10 May 1977) is a Sri Lankan first-class cricketer who plays for Sri Lanka Ports Authority Cricket Club.
