= Basnahira cricket team =

Sports team

Basnahira
- One Day name: Basnahira Elevens

Personnel
- Captain: Prasanna Jayawardene

Team information
- Colors: Blue
- Founded: Western Province; 1990–1991; Basnahira North and Basnahira South; 1992–2010; Basnahira; 2011
- Home ground: R Premadasa Stadium
- Capacity: 35,000

History
- First-class debut: Central Province in 1990 at Sinhalese Sports Club Ground
- IP FC wins: 4
- IP LO wins: none
- IP T20 wins: none
- Official website: Sri Lanka Cricket

The Basnahira cricket team, based in Colombo and representing Western Province, was one of the seven Sri Lankan provincial cricket teams that took part in the Inter-Provincial Cricket tournaments. The team drew players from the Sri Lanka Premier Trophy, and their team colours were green and blue. Basnahira took part in all three provincial tournaments: the first-class cricket competition known as the Inter-Provincial First Class Tournament, the List A competition known as the Inter-Provincial Limited Over Tournament and the Twenty20 competition known as the Inter-Provincial Twenty20. As Western Province has the best infrastructure sometimes the team was divided into two teams: Basnahira North and Basnahira South.

== History ==
From the early years of the Inter-Provincial tournament to the 2004/05 season the teams used English names, but from 2007/08 onwards the teams were named in Sinhalese. From its inception of the tournament Western Province presented more than one team to the tournament except for the 2003/04 and 2004/05 seasons. Since then Western province teams became known as Basnahira North and Basnahira South (Basnahira is Sinhalese for West). The number of teams representing the Western province varied from season to season, as did their names. In 2011 Basnahira North and South teams became Basnahira. Teams represented Western province for the each tournament given below.

Team	Season										
Team	1990	1990/91	1992	1993/94	1994/95	2003/04	2004/05	2007/08	2008/09	2009/10	2010/11
Western Province	Western Province	City, Suburbs	Suburbs, North, South	City, North, South		Western Province		North, South			Basnahira

== Honours ==
=== Domestic ===
==== Twenty20 ====
- Inter-Provincial Twenty20: 0
