= Thilina Kandamby =

Sri Lankan cricketer

Thilina Kandambi
Personal information
- Full name: Sahan Hewa Thilina Kandambi
- Born: 4 June 1982 (age 44); Colombo, Sri Lanka
- Batting: Left-handed
- Bowling: Right arm leg break

International information
- National side: Sri Lanka (2004–2011)
- ODI debut (cap 122): 27 April 2004 v Zimbabwe
- Last ODI: 24 June 2010 v India
- ODI shirt no.: 25
- T20I debut (cap 20): 10 October 2008 v Zimbabwe
- Last T20I: 25 June 2011 v England

Domestic team information
- Years: Team
- 2008–present: Basnahira North
- 2007–present: Sinhalese Sports Club
- 2001–2007: Bloomfield
- 2010–present: Dhaka Division

Head coaching information
- Years: Team
- 2020–2023; 2026: Jaffna Kings

Career statistics
Competition	ODI	T20I	FC	LA
Matches	33	5	163	157
Runs scored	814	13	8,758	3,681
Batting average	32.56	3.25	40.73	31.73
100s/50s	0/5	0/0	19/41	2/24
Top score	93*	10	340*	128*
Balls bowled	168	–	2,868	981
Wickets	2	–	55	27
Bowling average	82.00	–	38.65	31.92
5 wickets in innings	0	–	0	0
10 wickets in match	0	–	0	0
Best bowling	2/37	–	4/36	4/68
Catches/stumpings	5/–	4/–	85/–	41/–
- Source: Cricinfo, 3 March 2017

Sahan Hewa Thilina Kandambi (born 4 June 1982) is a Sri Lankan former international cricketer and a former T20 international captain for Sri Lanka. A specialist middle-order batsman, Kandambi was marked out as a talent early, playing for the Sri Lanka Under 19s from 1998 to 2001. He also played ten first class games for the Sri Lanka A cricket team. In January 2021 he was appointed as the head coach of the T10 team Bangla Tigers.

== International career ==
Kandambi made his One Day International debut batting at number six against Zimbabwe in 2004, but lasted four balls before he was caught behind off Mluleki Nkala for a duck. His next three performances brought him a total of 23 runs, and although he was on the team that won the 2004 Asia Cup, lack of performance saw Dilhara Fernando replace him at the 2004 Champions Trophy immediately following the Asia Cup.

In 2008 he returned to Zimbabwe tour and scored a crucial 40 in a low-scoring game to set up the victory. After that series he joined the Pakistan tour of Sri Lanka and scored 59 runs against Pakistan in the 2nd ODI match which resulted in a win for Sri Lanka in that series.

=== Captaincy ===
Kandambi was named as stand-in captain for one-off Twenty20 International against England in 2011 in which Sri Lanka won the match comfortably.

== Domestic career ==
He made his Twenty20 debut on 17 August 2004, for Bloomfield Cricket and Athletic Club in the 2004 SLC Twenty20 Tournament.

Kandambi then plied his trade for Central Province and Bloomfield in the Sri Lankan domestic leagues, in addition to playing for Sri Lanka A against touring sides. He played two first class games against New Zealand A in 2005–06, scoring 103 runs in four innings, while as of 1 February 2006 he had not made a half-century in the Premier Championship.

In 2004, Kandambi scored 52 for the Sri Lankans against Zimbabwe A. His score was made up of 10 fours and two sixes; this was the first time in first-class cricket that a completed innings of 50 or more had consisted entirely of boundaries.

In 2008–09 against South Africa A side both Kandamby and Rangana Herath, who were playing for Sri Lanka A side, put on an unbeaten 203 for the 7th wicket, which is also the highest for the 7th wicket for any pair in List A cricket history.

== Coaching ==
Kandambi is currently the Head Coach of Sinhalese Sports Club. Kandambi appointed as coach of Jaffna franchise for 2020 edition of Lanka Premier League and ended as a champion of the event. He will continue to coach Jaffna Kings despite change in management of the Jaffna team. In March 2022 he been selected as the assistant coach for the Sri Lanka List A team.
