= Hemantha Wickramaratne =

Sri Lankan cricketer (born 1971)

Personal information
- Full name: Ranasinghe Pattikirikoralalage Aruna Hemantha Wickramaratne
- Born: 21 February 1971 (age 55); Colombo, Sri Lanka
- Batting: Right-handed
- Bowling: Wicketkeeper

International information
- National side: Sri Lanka
- ODI debut (cap 72): 4 September 1993 v South Africa
- Last ODI: 16 December 1993 v West Indies

Career statistics
Competition	ODI
Matches	3
Runs scored	4
Batting average	2.00
100s/50s	0/0
Top score	3
Catches/stumpings	0/–
- Source: Cricinfo, 1 May 2016

Ranasinghe Pattikirikoralalage Aruna Hemantha Wickramaratne (born 21 February 1971), or Hemantha Wickramaratne, is a Sri Lankan former cricketer who played three One Day Internationals in 1993. He made his Twenty20 debut on 17 August 2004, for Sinhalese Sports Club against Burgher in the 2004 SLC Twenty20 Tournament. In November 2018, he was named on Sri Lanka Cricket's national selection panel.
