= Janaka Gunaratne =

Sri Lankan cricketer (born 1981)

Personal information
- Full name: Liyanabadalge Janaka Prabath Gunaratne
- Born: 14 March 1981 (age 45)
- Batting: Right-handed
- Bowling: Right-arm offbreak
- Role: Allrounder
- Source: Cricinfo, 10 November 2017

Janaka Gunaratne (born 14 March 1981) is a Sri Lankan cricketer. He played 157 first-class and 114 List A matches for multiple domestic sides in Sri Lanka between 2001 and 2015. He made his Twenty20 debut on 17 August 2004, for Chilaw Marians Cricket Club in the 2004 SLC Twenty20 Tournament. His last first-class match was for Moors Sports Club in the 2014–15 Premier Trophy on 26 March 2015.

== See also ==
- List of Chilaw Marians Cricket Club players
