= Wayamba cricket team =

Wayamba Elevens
Personnel
- Captain: (Sri Lanka) Mahela Jayawardene
- Coach: (Sri Lanka) Lanka de Silva

Team information
- Colours: Green Blue White
- Founded: 1990
- Home ground: Welagedara Stadium
- Capacity: 10,000

History
- First-class debut: Ruhuna in 1990 at Galle International Stadium
- IP FC wins: 0 (Group Stage 2010)
- IP LO wins: 1 Joint champions with Kandurata (2007–08)
- IP T20 wins: 3 (2007–08, 2008–09, 2009–10)
- CLT20 wins: none
- Official website: Sri Lanka Cricket

Wayamba cricket team was a Sri Lankan first class cricket team based in Kurunegala, that represented North Western Province. It drew cricketers from Sri Lanka Premier Trophy. The team competed in two provincial tournaments: the first class cricket competition known as the Inter-Provincial Tournament, and the Twenty20 competition known as the Inter-Provincial Twenty20. Also Wayamba province cricket team became joint champions with Kandurata in the 2007/08 Inter-Provincial Limited overs tournament after the finals match drawn due to rain.

Sri Lanka captain Mahela Jayawardene, Ajantha Mendis and Thilan Samaraweera are some of the experienced cricketers play for Wayamba province cricket team.

Wayamba Province cricket team participated every tournament from the inaugural season to 1994/95 season. After the tournament revived after nearly ten years in 2003/04 season the team excluded from the tournament. Eventually in 2007/08 when the team included again in the Inter-Provincial Limited overs tournament they went on to win the title under the captaincy of Mahela Jayawardene.

== Name ==
When the Inter-provincial tournament started in 1990 teams used English names. The team representing North Western Province is known as North Western province team. But from the 2007/08 season, the teams named in Sinhalese, North Western province team then onwards known as "Wayamba team" (Sinhalese for "North West").

== History ==
=== Early years (1990–2000) ===
Sri Lanka Cricket fearing that Club cricket alone would not be enough to keep Sri Lankan cricket competitive, the Inter-Provincial Cricket Tournament was created as a domestic first-class cricket tournament in Sri Lanka in 1990. From the inauguration of the tournament, in 1990, participating teams varied from year to year. The tournament started with four provincial teams. They were Western Province, Central Province, Southern Province and Wayamba.

In the first first-class Inter-provincial tournament, which was called the 1990 Singer Inter-Provincial Trophy, Wayamba, then called North Central Province, captained by Ranjith Madurasinghe, had come last out of the four provinces, losing all their matches and finishing the tournament with only five points. Western Province went on to win the tournament, not losing a game.

=== Establishment of Twenty20 (2000–2010) ===
With the establishment of Twenty20 cricket in 2003, it came to Sri Lanka in 2004 as the Twenty20 Tournament, however this was replaced with the Inter-Provincial Twenty20 in 2008. Wayamba won the 2007–08 Inter-Provincial Twenty20, which was the first edition of the tournament. They had won four out of five matches in the group stage and eventually won their way into the finals with Ruhuna. Wayamba won by 31 runs.

The end of 2007 and the start of 2008 was host to the first Inter-Provincial Limited Over Tournament. Wayamba came second on the points table winning two matches and losing two matches and eventually gaining a place in the finals with Kandurata. In the final, captained by Sanjeewa de Silva, Wayamba won the toss and decided to field. Playing a rain reduced game kandurata posted a score of 131 for 5 wickets in 29.3 overs. Wayamba had a revised target of 143 runs in 25 overs, however the match ended up as a no result after 6 overs into the Wayamba innings with a score of 37. The trophy was shared between the two teams.

The 2008–09 Inter-Provincial Twenty20 was the second edition of the Inter-Provincial Twenty20, where the Wayamba elevens won. Losing only their first match to Basnahira South and making it into the knockout stage. Facing Ruhuna, they drew with 88 runs each. Wayamba won bowl-out 3–2. In the final they met Basnahira South, winning with an over to spare getting the 145 runs needed, and qualifying for the 2009 Champions League Twenty20.

In the 2009 Inter-provincial tournament, Wayamba became runners-up after their defeat by 10 wickets in the finals in the hands of Basnahira North team. Though the Wayamba team won the title of Inter-Provincial Twenty20 tournament of 2009 season defeating Basnahira South team. Wayamba took Basnahira South's last nine wickets for just eleven runs, and went on to win the match by 5 wickets. 21 years old Isuru Udana was adjudged man of the match and series.

==== 2009 Champions League Twenty20 ====
The Wayamba cricket team featured in the 2009 Champions League Twenty20 as the Wayamba elevens.

=== 2010–present ===
In the second edition of the Inter-Provincial Limited Over Tournament, which had skipped 2009. Wayamba won three and only lost to the two Basnahiras coming third in the points table, behind Ruhuna and Kandurata.

In 2010 the Wayamba cricket team won their third Inter-Provincial Twenty20 tournament, winning in style not losing a game, and the discovery of Mahela Jayawardene as Twenty20 opener. This was the third time in a row Wayamba had won the tournament and the second time they have qualified for the Champions League Twenty20. The Wayamba elevens won every game including the knockout stage. In the final they met Ruhuna, were Wayamba was put into bat, they scored 208 for 8 wickets in the full twenty overs and the opposition replied only being able to score 113 runs in 13.2 overs.

==== 2010 Champions League Twenty20 ====
There were high hopes for Wayamba for the 2010 Champions League Twenty20, sending a team with 11 players with international caps.

== Grounds and Sponsorship ==
Welagedara Stadium
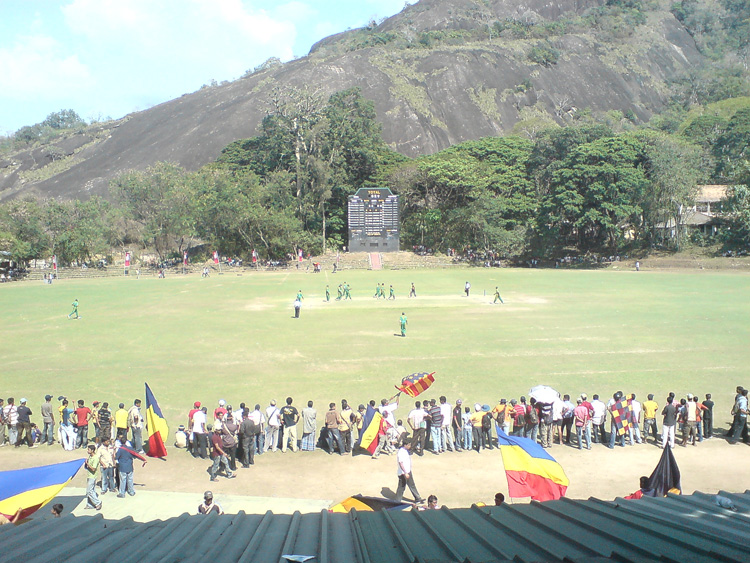
- Location: Kurunegala, North Western Province, Sri Lanka
- Capacity: 10,000

Construction
- Opened: 1972

Tenant
- Wayamba cricket team (1990–present)

Welagedara Stadium is a multi-use stadium in Kurunegala, in the North Western Province of Sri Lanka, which is situated about 100 km north east of Kandy. The stadium is currently used mostly for cricket matches and is the home ground of Wayamba cricket team. The stadium can hold at least 10,000 spectators. Since its wicket had been replaced from a matting wicket to a turf one it has become one of the best batting wickets in the country. It was officially declared open by the then Minister of Home Affairs, Justice Felix Dias Bandaranaike in 1972. Welagedara stadium hosted its first international match when Pakistan played there in 1985. In recent times it has regularly hosted international tour matches, unofficial test matches and U19 one-day games. The ground is an extremely picturesque one, with the giant 'Elephant Rock' forming a dramatic back-drop to the ground. It also has historic value being situated in an important location for when Kurunegala was an important Kingdom, King Bhuvanaikabahu VI, would address his subjects from the press box beneath the Elephant Rock.

Lanka Bell, a Sri Lankan telecommunication company is the team's sponsor.

== Players ==
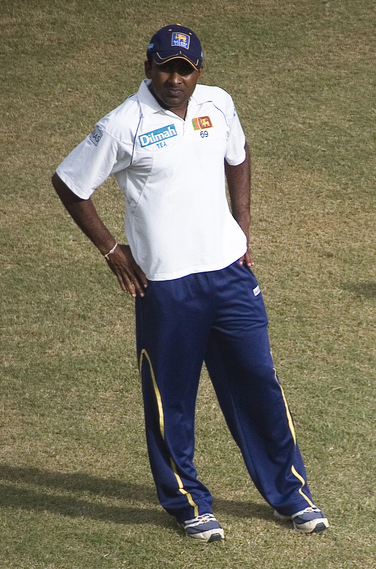
Mahela Jayawardene of Wayamba.

There have been many prominent and experienced cricketers players that have played for Wayamba province cricket team including former Sri Lanka cricket captain Mahela Jayawardene, Ajantha Mendis and Jehan Mubarak. The top seventy-five players from the Sri Lankan Premier Limited Overs Tournament are selected for the Inter-Provincial Twenty20 tournament. Then players allotted for the five provincial teams. Therefore, many players from other provinces represent Wayamba team. Though former Sri Lankan Test cricketer Lanka de Silva is from Kurunegala.

=== Current squad ===
Players with international caps are listed in bold.
No.	Name	Nat	Birth date	Batting style	Bowling style	Notes
Batsmen
19	**Michael Vandort**	(Sri Lanka)	19 January 1980 (age 46)	Left-handed	Right arm medium pace	Not Included in CLT20 15-man Squad
24	**Jeevantha Kulatunga**	(Sri Lanka)	2 November 1973 (age 52)	Right-handed	Right arm medium pace	
27	**Mahela Jayawardene**	(Sri Lanka)	27 May 1977 (age 49)	Right-handed	Right arm medium pace	Captain
All-rounders
1	**Thisara Perera**	(Sri Lanka)	3 April 1989 (age 37)	Left-handed	Right arm medium-fast	
23	**Kaushal Lokuarachchi**	(Sri Lanka)	20 May 1982 (age 44)	Right-handed	Right arm leg break	
28	**Farveez Maharoof**	(Sri Lanka)	4 January 1985 (age 41)	Right-handed	Right arm fast-medium	
69	Shalika Karunanayake	(Sri Lanka)	14 February 1987 (age 39)	Right-handed	Right arm fast-medium	
Wicket-keepers
44	Sameera de Zoysa	(Sri Lanka)	31 January 1987 (age 39)	Left-hand bat	–	
??	Damitha Hunukumbura	(Sri Lanka)	7 November 1977 (age 48)	Left-hand bat	–	
Bowlers
12	**Chanaka Welegedara**	(Sri Lanka)	20 March 1981 (age 45)	Right-handed	Left arm fast-medium	
14	**Rangana Herath**	(Sri Lanka)	19 March 1978 (age 48)	Left-handed	Slow left-arm orthodox	
17	**Isuru Udana**	(Sri Lanka)	17 February 1988 (age 38)	Right-handed	Left arm medium-fast	
40	**Ajantha Mendis**	(Sri Lanka)	11 March 1985 (age 41)	Right-handed	Right arm off break, leg break	
54	**Ishara Amerasinghe**	(Sri Lanka)	5 March 1978 (age 48)	Right-handed	Right arm fast-medium	Not Included in CLT20 15-man Squad

=== Notable players ===
The following is a list of notable players who have represented both Wayamba and Sri Lanka.

- (Sri Lanka) Chandika Hathurusingha
- (Sri Lanka) Ranjith Madurasinghe
- (Sri Lanka) Roshan Mahanama
- (Sri Lanka) Eric Upashantha
- (Sri Lanka) Asanka Gurusinha
- (Sri Lanka) Lanka de Silva
- (Sri Lanka) Mahela Jayawardene
- (Sri Lanka) Kumar Dharmasena
- (Sri Lanka) Shantha Kalavitigoda
- (Sri Lanka) Pulasthi Gunaratne
- (Sri Lanka) Tillakaratne Dilshan
- (Sri Lanka) Gayan Wijekoon
- (Sri Lanka) Akalanka Ganegama
- (Sri Lanka) Nuwan Kulasekara
- (Sri Lanka) Rangana Herath
- (Sri Lanka) Jehan Mubarak
- (Sri Lanka) Ishara Amerasinghe
- (Sri Lanka) Kaushal Lokuarachchi
- (Sri Lanka) Farveez Maharoof
- (Sri Lanka) Ajantha Mendis
- (Sri Lanka) Mahela Udawatte
- (Sri Lanka) Michael Vandort
- (Sri Lanka) Chanaka Welegedara
- (Sri Lanka) Suresh Perera
- (Sri Lanka) Jeevantha Kulatunga

== Honours ==
=== Domestic ===
==== First Class ====
- Inter-Provincial First Class Tournament: 0

==== List A ====
- Inter-Provincial Limited Over Tournament: 1

2007–08

==== Twenty20 ====
- Inter-Provincial Twenty20: 3

2007–08, 2008–09, 2009–10

=== Worldwide ===
==== Twenty20 ====
- Champions League Twenty20: 0
