= Western Province cricket team (Sri Lanka) =

Western Province cricket team was a team that represented the Western Province of Sri Lanka in domestic first-class cricket in the Inter-Provincial Cricket Tournament. Western Province played three first-class matches in 1990, four in 2003–04, and three in 2004–05.
