= List of Sri Lanka Air Force Sports Club cricketers =

List of first-class cricketers by club

This is a list in alphabetical order of cricketers who have played for Sri Lanka Air Force Sports Club in top-class (Note: Top-class matches are first-class, List A, and Twenty20.) matches since the club initially achieved first-class status in 1989.

== Key ==
- † preceding a player's name means that the original article is now a redirect to this list.

=== A ===
- Kasun Abeyrathne (2017/18)
- A. N. D. Ahangama (2023)
- Nusky Ahmed (2019/20)
- I. S. Akilanka (2022)
- M. S. W. Amarasiri (1989/90)
- D. Amarnath (2014/15)
- K. A. Anandakumara (2023-2023/24)
- Senaka Angulugaha (1983/84-2001/02)
- Y. C. R. Aravinda (2003/04-2005/06)
- W. P. A. Ariyadasa (2000/01-2001/02)
- P. G. S. R. Ariyatilleke (1988/89-1989/90)
- N. G. L. G. Asanka (2023)

=== B ===
- A. M. C. M. K. Bandara (2007/08)
- J. M. D. D. Bandara (2011/12-2017/18)
- B. W. K. S. Bulathwala (2009/10-2015/16)

=== C ===
- B. H. H. L. Chamikara (2017/18-2023/24)
- Umega Chaturanga (2018/19)
- A. R. Chauhan (2023-2023/24)
- M. S. G. Cooray (2002/03-2003/04)
- P. D. M. A. Cooray (2021/22)

=== D ===
- Sagara Dananjaya (2001/02-2004/05)
- A. A. S. de Alwis (2020/21)
- A. D. N. R. de Alwis (1983/84-2001/02)
- G. Debahapuwa (1983/84)
- T. S. C. Denipitiya (2017/18-2020/21)
- S. J. Desai (2023)
- A. de Silva (1987/88)
- A. M. C. M. de Silva (2014/15)
- C. A. de Silva (1983/84-1988/89)
- E. K. Y. A. de Silva (2008/09-2009/10)
- Gayan de Silva (2019/20-2023/24)
- G. S. K. de Silva (2012/13-2014/15)
- Dinesh Manjula de Silva (2004/05-2006/07)
- K. M. M. de Silva (2023-2023/24)
- K. M. S. de Silva (2004/05-2009/10)
- L. A. H. de Silva (2009/10)
- P. H. K. de Silva (2003/04-2004/05)
- P. N. de Silva (2023-2023/24)
- S. de Soysa (1987/88)
- R. S. S. S. de Zoysa (2020/21)
- I. P. Dharmawardene (2005/06)
- S. N. S. R. Dias (2022-2023/24)
- W. M. M. S. Dias (2009/10)
- H. P. I. Dilhan (2000/01)
- A. G. N. Dilip (2005/06)
- W. K. G. Dilruk (2013/14)
- H. A. N. Dilshan (2023-2023/24)
- M. U. Dissanayake (2005/06-2006/07)
- M. W. B. Dissanayake (2007/08-2008/09)
- Ranga Dissanayake (2000/01-2017/18)

=== E ===
- E. M. K. B. Ekanayake (2020/21-2021/22)
- E. M. K. H. Ekanayake (2022/23)
- A. B. Emmanuel (2010/11-2014/15)
- Achira Eranga (2007/08-2016/17)

=== F ===
- M. A. M. Faizer (2007/08)
- E. R. N. S. Fernando (1983/84-1989/90)
- H. M. P. Fernando (2009/10)
- H. S. D. Fernando (2022-2022/23)
- Dinusha Fernando (2010/11)
- K. S. V. Fernando (2012/13)
- M. Fernando (2015/16)
- M. A. S. Fernando (2023/24)
- M. M. N. Fernando (2019/20-2020/21)
- N. Fernando (2002/03)
- N. L. Fernando (2016/17)
- P. M. S. M. Fernando (2008/09-2009/10)
- Thilak Fernando (1987/88-2003/04)
- S. E. D. R. Fernando (2000/01-2004/05)
- S. L. S. Fernando (2017/18)
- S. S. Fernando (2022-2023/24)
- W. C. N. Fernando (2019/20-2023/24)
- W. H. N. J. Fernando (2002/03-2005/06)
- Wesley Fernando (2000/01-2001/02)
- W. W. C. S. Fernando (2008/09)
- W. G. D. Fonseka (2008/09)

=== G ===
- K. P. Gajasinghe (2018/19)
- R. C. Galappathy (2000/01-2006/07)
- Sagara Gallage (1987/88-2001/02)
- Chamila Gamage (2000/01-2011/12)
- W. M. M. W. E. V. Gangoda (2007/08)
- S. C. Gunasekera (2000/01-2001/02)
- M. D. D. C. R. Gunathilake (2014/15)
- M. P. G. D. P. Gunatilleke (2007/08-2008/09)
- D. D. S. Gunawardena (2012/13)
- Ravindu Gunawardene (2017/18-2018/19)

=== H ===
- S. C. Hawavitharana (2022-2022/23)
- H. M. R. Herath (1989/90)
- D. I. Hettiarachchi (2009/10)
- K. M. Hettiarachchi (2023)
- P. C. Hewage (2010/11-2014/15)
- A. L. Himbutugoda (2018/19-2020/21)
- K. H. Hiranya (2022)

=== I ===
- Shabik Ifthary (2019/20)
- Umal Irandika (2002/03-2005/06)
- † Akila Isanka (2009/10-2014/15)
- N. Ishan (2022-2023)

=== J ===
- Hashan Harshana James (2016/17-2017/18)
- J. A. K. G. Jayakody (2023/24)
- M. G. N. A. Jayaratne (2001/02-2003/04)
- M. S. S. Jayasekara (2018/19)
- U. G. H. Jayasekara (2005/06)
- A. Jayasekera (1983/84)
- S. P. Jayasinghe (2008/09)
- A. S. R. Jayasuriya (2004/05)
- L. D. L. J. Jayasuriya (2008/09)
- S. T. Jayasuriya (2011/12)
- M. A. S. Jayathilake (2022/23)
- N. P. Jayatilleke (1988/89-1989/90)
- R. Jayawardena (2015/16)
- S. Jayawardena (2015/16)
- S. M. D. Jayawardena (2022/23)
- Sahan Jayawardene (2009/10-2016/17)
- R. Jayawardene (2015/16)
- S. T. R. Jayawardene (2010/11-2014/15)
- R. Jurangpathy (1983/84)

=== K ===
- G. H. Kamosh (2023/24)
- S. A. V. Kanchuka (2014/15)
- D. S. Kandebadda (2023/24)
- D. R. R. Kannangara (2008/09)
- S. H. B. K. Karunanayake (2005/06-2006/07)
- D. M. A. D. Karunaratne (2008/09-2015/16)
- H. K. Karunaratne (1983/84-2001/02)
- Ruchira Karunasena (2007/08)
- U. L. D. A. Kaushalya (2019/20)
- R. S. G. Kern (2010/11)
- A. Kodituwakku (1983/84)
- M. K. P. B. Kularatne (2007/08-2008/09)
- G. P. C. Kumara (2019/20)
- H. G. Kumara (2023/24)
- K. A. Kumara (2000/01-2013/14)
- K. G. C. P. Kumara (2014/15)
- Lahiru Kumara (2015/16)
- M. W. D. L. Kumara (2017/18-2018/19)
- Pramodh Kumara (2015/16)

=== L ===
- K. K. A. K. Lakmal (2007/08)
- M. W. L. S. Lakmal (2013/14-2016/17)
- D. G. N. H. Laknath (2004/05)
- Suminda Lakshan (2016/17-2019/20)
- Pasindu Lakshanka (2014/15)
- G. S. K. Langappuli (2008/09)
- A. K. K. Y. Lanka (2012/13-2014/15)
- D. P. L. M. Liyanage (2008/09)
- D. T. Liyanage (2017/18-2018/19)

=== M ===
- Suwanji Madanayake (2005/06-2008/09)
- W. K. Madhushanka (2019/20)
- W. A. D. P. Madusanka (2023-2023/24)
- Kanishka Madhushanka (2022-2023)
- A. Malshan (2019/20-2020/21)
- M. P. U. D. Mannapperuma (2023/24)
- P. Y. U. Manohara (2013/14)
- A. Mendis (2015/16)
- B. M. D. K. Mendis (2021/22-2023/24)
- B. R. P. Mendis (2009/10)
- Nimesha Mendis (2016/17-2020/21)
- S. A. D. U. Mihiran (2017/18-2018/19)
- U. A. Morais (2015/16)

=== N ===
- T. Nadeera (2010/11-2014/15)
- J. R. G. Namal (2010/11-2017/18)
- K. G. V. R. Nanayakkara (2023-2023/24)
- S. A. Nanayakkara (2022/23)
- K. T. S. Navaratne (2011/12-2012/13)
- M. N. Nevinda (2003/04)
- P. K. J. R. N. Nonis (2019/20)

=== P ===
- P. M. A. N. Palihakoon (2003/04-2004/05)
- Udayawansha Parakrama (2015/16-2023/24)
- P. K. N. Pavithra (2013/14)
- M. J. R. Peiris (2009/10-2017/18)
- Rashan Peiris (2000/01-2003/04)
- D. C. G. Perera (2009/10)
- D. R. S. Perera (2018/19)
- K. A. K. V. Perera (2009/10)
- K. D. D. H. N. Perera (2005/06)
- K. H. G. Perera (2022-2023)
- Tharindu Perera (2008/09-2021/22)
- L. G. P. Perera (2000/01)
- M. M. D. Perera (1989/90)
- T. Y. H. Perera (2022)
- U. R. P. Perera (2009/10-2010/11)
- V. K. G. Perera (2019/20)
- W. C. M. Perera (2007/08-2009/10)
- S. G. Perumpuli (2006/07)
- M. R. Porage (2006/07-2007/08)
- M. D. R. Prabath (2006/07-2007/08)
- W. S. G. Prasanga (2010/11-2012/13)
- J. A. H. S. Prasanna (2004/05)
- K. D. A. Premakumara (2004/05)
- K. A. D. V. C. Premaratne (2010/11)
- M. Premaratne (2017/18-2023/24)
- S. D. P. A. Premaratne (2019/20-2021/22)
- A. M. I. Priyadarshana (2010/11)
- S. Priyamal (2018/19-2019/20)
- G. S. Priyankara (2004/05-2022)
- Kapugama Priyantha (1987/88-1989/90)

=== R ===
- T. Rajakaruna (2015/16)
- B. D. S. A. Rajapakse (2007/08)
- R. Rajapakse (1987/88)
- U. J. Ranasinghe (2014/15-2016/17)
- K. S. N. Ranaweera (1989/90)
- Sanjaya Ranaweera (2017/18-2022)
- S. K. C. Randunu (2023-2023/24)
- Shohan Rangika (2012/13-2017/18)
- Milan Rathnayake (2016/17-2018/19)
- B. M. R. N. B. Ratnayake (2009/10-2022)
- R. A. N. R. Ratnayake (1983/84-1989/90)
- M. Ravichandrakumar (2022/23)
- A. Rizan (2000/01-2009/10)
- L. Rodrigo (1987/88)
- Manoj Rodrigo (2003/04)
- W. L. R. P. Rodrigo (1989/90)
- Lasanda Rukmal (2011/12-2023/24)
- A. K. T. Rukshan (2023)
- L. A. C. Ruwansiri (2023/24)

=== S ===
- Chathura Samantha (2014/15-2017/18)
- R. Samarasinghe (1983/84)
- P. G. Sandaruwan (2023)
- Buddika Sandaruwan (2009/10-2017/18)
- Nuwan Sanjeewa (2000/01)
- S. W. C. Sanjeewa (2001/02-2004/05)
- L. A. S. Saumya (2022)
- A. P. Sedara (2000/01-2001/02)
- R. S. Sembukuttige (2018/19-2021/22)
- Vishal Senanayake (2015/16-2016/17)
- Nuwan Shiroman (2008/09)
- A. G. K. Silva (2010/11-2017/18)
- D. O. L. Silva (2005/06-2006/07)
- G. N. C. D. Silva (2005/06-2009/10)
- Roy Silva (2000/01-2003/04)
- K. V. S. S. Silva (2016/17)
- M. Silva (2022/23)
- M. M. S. S. Silva (2011/12-2012/13)
- Rashindra Silva (2017/18-2019/20)
- T. D. V. Silva (2023)
- T. K. M. Y. Silva (2009/10)
- Asantha Singappulige (2020/21-2021/22)
- K. L. S. K. Sirisena (1983/84)
- R. M. G. K. Sirisoma (2021/22-2022/23)
- Kalindu Siriwardana (2020/21-2023/24)
- S. M. D. L. Siriwardena (2020/21)
- S. Soysa (1987/88-1988/89)
- L. Sri Lakmal (2015/16)
- K. M. G. P. Srimal (2023/24)
- M. H. Subasingha (2020/21-2023/24)

=== T ===
- Dilip Tharaka (2016/17-2018/19)
- Roscoe Thattil (2011/12-2023/24)
- U. H. P. Thimanka (2004/05)
- W. C. R. Tissera (2000/01-2005/06)

=== U ===
- Sachika Udara (2015/16-2018/19)
- Heshan Umendra (2017/18-2018/19)

=== V ===
- V. K. R. Vidyarathna (2023)
- Dushan Vimukthi (2013/14)
- Hashan Vimukthi (2018/19-2022/23)
- S. I. Vithana (2011/12)

=== W ===
- W. C. A. Wagaarachchi (2023)
- M. D. S. Wanasinghe (2005/06-2008/09)
- M. M. B. R. S. T. C. Wanigaratne (2009/10)
- W. S. C. Wanigasekera (2012/13-2014/15)
- D. N. Y. Warapitiya (2016/17)
- A. S. Warnakulasuriya (2003/04)
- Madawa Warnapura (2008/09)
- R. N. Weerakkody (1987/88-1989/90)
- Dilum Weerarathne (2015/16)
- W. A. P. D. K. Weeraratne (2017/18)
- K. C. A. Weerasinghe (2001/02-2002/03)
- Risira Weerasuriya (2019/20)
- Navod Madushanka Weeratunga (2019/20)
- Pubudu Wickrama (2001/02-2008/09)
- D. C. M. Wickramasinghe (2009/10)
- W. A. H. N. Wickramasinghe (2014/15)
- Y. A. D. S. C. Wickramasinghe (2020/21)
- J. S. I. Wijemanne (1983/84-1989/90)
- Kemira Wijenayake (2021/22-2023/24)
- S. D. Wijenayake (1983/84)
- S. Wijeratne (1987/88)
- C. G. Wijesinghe (2018/19)
- D. P. Wijesinghe (2021/22)
- S. Wijesinghe (2016/17)
- Nalin Wijesinghe (2002/03-2004/05)
- Kalana Wijesiri (2020/21-2022/23)
- S. D. Wijewardana (2020/21)
- M. S. Wille (2009/10)
- Rakitha Wimaladarma (2004/05)
- C. M. Withanage (2016/17)
