= List of North Central Province representative cricketers =

This is a list of cricket players who have played representative cricket for North Central Province in Sri Lanka. North Central Province cricket team was founded in 2004.

It includes players that have played at least one match, in senior First-Class, List A cricket, or Twenty20 matches. Practice matches are not included, unless they have officially been classified at First-class tour matches.

The Inter-Provincial Cricket Tournament is the premier domestic cricket competition in Sri Lanka. It was founded in 1990.

== First Class Players ==
All of the cricket players who have represented Ruhuna in first class cricket in order of their appearance for the team:

1. Shantha Kalavitigoda
2. Janaka Gunaratne
3. Lanka de Silva
4. Mahela Jayawardene
5. Nuwan Kulasekara
6. Tillakaratne Dilshan
7. Kumar Dharmasena
8. Praneeth Jayasundera
9. Rangana Herath
10. Omesh Wijesiriwardene
11. Nandika Ranjith
12. Manoj Mendis
13. Gayan Wijekoon
14. Charith Sylvester
15. Akalanka Ganegama
16. Avishka Gunawardene
17. Upul Chandana
18. Farveez Maharoof
19. Jeevantha Kulatunga
20. Chanaka Welagedara
21. Dhanuka Pathirana
22. Amila Weththasinghe

== List 'A' Players ==
North Central Province is yet to play any List A matches.

== Twenty20 Players ==
North Central Province is yet to play any Twenty20 matches.
