= List of Sri Lanka Schools XI representative cricketers =

This is a list of cricket players who have played representative cricket for Sri Lanka Schools XI in Sri Lanka.

It includes players that have played at least one match, in senior First-Class, List A cricket, or Twenty20 matches. Practice matches are not included, unless they have officially been classified at First-class tour matches.

The Inter-Provincial Cricket Tournament is the premier domestic cricket competition in Sri Lanka. It was founded in 1990.

== First Class Players ==
All of the Players who have represented Sri Lanka Schools XI in First-Class matches:

- 1. Sumalka Perera
- 2. Jeewan Mendis
- 3. Sahan Wijeratne
- 4. Ishan Mutaliph
- 5. Charith Sylvester
- 6. Farveez Maharoof
- 7. Gamini Chandrakumara
- 8. Ganganath Ratnayake
- 9. Dhammika Niroshana
- 10. Malinga Surappulige
- 11. Ishara Dilshan
- 12. Upul Tharanga
- 13. Gihan de Silva
- 14. Dammika Kariyawasam
- 15. Upul Indrasiri
- 16. Lasith Malinga
- 17. Manoj Chanaka
- 18. Mohamed Faizer
- 19. Tyrone de Silva
- 20. Eshan Abeysinghe
- 21. Damith Ratnayake
- 22. Jayamal Fernando
- 23. Udesh Perera
- 24. Damith Indika
- 25. Kaushal Silva
- 26. Chanaka Komasaru
- 27. Nadhula de Silva
- 28. Daminda Kularatne
- 29. Udara Varuna
- 30. Suraj Randiv
- 31. Sudheera de Zoysa
- 32. Kanchana Gunawardene
- 33. Chinthaka Perera

== List 'A' Players ==
Sri Lanka Schools XI is yet to play any List A cricket matches.

== Twenty20 Players ==
All of the Players who have represented Sri Lanka Schools XI in Twenty20 domestic competitions:

- 1. Tharinda Fernando
- 2. Dinesh Chandimal
- 3. Chaturanga de Silva
- 4. Kushal Perera
- 5. Angelo Perera
- 6. Chathura Peiris
- 7. Nipun Karunanayake
- 8. Charith Jayampathi
- 9. Imesh Udayanga
- 10. Vinodh Perera
- 11. Navin Kavikara
- 12. Nadun Pathirana
- 13. Udara Jayasundera
- 14. Dhanushka Gunathilleke
- 15. Lahiru Jayarathne
- 16. Bhanuka Rajapaksa
- 17. Malith Cooray
- 18. Matheesha Perera
- 19. Vimukthi Perera
- 20. Buwaneka Ekanayake
- 21. Vimanga Perera
- 22. Shameera Weerasinghe
- 23. Dilan Gangoda
- 24. Dunusha Fernando
- 25. Rushan Jaleel
- 26. Dilan Chandima
- 27. Vimukthi Dasanayake
