= 2004 SLC Twenty20 Tournament =

Cricket tournament

- Administrator: Sri Lanka Cricket
- Cricket format: Twenty20
- Tournament format(s): Round-robin and Knockout
- Host: Sri Lanka
- Champions: Chilaw Marians Cricket Club (1st title)
- Runners-up: Colts Cricket Club
- Matches: 15
- Official website: Cricinfo site

The 2004 SLC Twenty20 Tournament is the 1st season of the official Twenty20 domestic cricket competition in Sri Lanka. 15 teams in total, five representing four provinces of Sri Lanka and a Sri Lanka Schools XI team participating in the competition. The competition began on 17 August 2004, when Bloomfield Cricket and Athletic Club played the Police Sports Club at Colts Cricket Club Ground, Colombo.

This season comprised eight regular matches, four quarter finals, two semi finals and a final.

== Teams ==
Team name (Sponsored name)	Captain
Bloomfield Cricket and Athletic Club	Kumar Dharmasena
Police Sports Club	Manohara Kudagodage
Sinhalese Sports Club	Hemantha Wickramaratne
Burgher Recreation Club	Sanjeewa Silva
Chilaw Marians Cricket Club	Hasantha Fernando
Galle Cricket Club	Duminda Wickramasinghe
Colombo Cricket Club	Lanka de Silva
Panadura Sports Club	Ruchira Palliyaguruge
Sri Lankan Air Force Sports Club	Ajith Kumara
Colts Cricket Club	Romesh Kaluwitharana
Kurunegala Youth Cricket Club	Muditha Fernando
Sebastianites Cricket and Athletic Club	Suranjith Silva
Moors Sports Club	Rangana Herath
Ragama Cricket Club	Ruwan Dilruk
Nondescripts Cricket Club	Russel Arnold
Tamil Union Cricket and Athletic Club	Sandun Dias

== Fixtures ==
=== Round 1 ===
17 August 2004
Scorecard

Police Sports Club; 133 (19.2 overs)	v	Bloomfield Cricket and Athletic Club; 135/4 (16.4 overs)
Saman Wijeratne 41 (25); Tillakaratne Dilshan 3/23 (4 overs)		Saman Jayantha 84* (46); Aruna Priyantha 2/23 (3 overs)

Bloomfield won by 6 wickets
Colts Cricket Club Ground
Umpires: Jagath Nandakumar and Philip Mendis

- Bloomfield, who chose to field
- Saman Jayantha, Ian Daniel, Thilina Kandamby, Tillakaratne Dilshan, Kumar Dharmasena, Farveez Maharoof, Tillakaratne Sampath, Udara Warna, Tharanga Lakshitha, Gihan De Silva, and Dharshana Gamage (Bloomfield Cricket and Athletic Club); and Pradeep Udawatta, Saman Wijeratne, Nihal Zoysa, Mahaesh Kuruppu, Dammika Rajapakse, Aruna Priyantha, Rasmi Jinan, Mohamed Shazmil, Manohara Kudagodage, Amila Mendis, and Vajira Ranaweera (Police Sports Club) made their T20 debuts.

17 August 2004
Scorecard

Sinhalese Sports Club; 134/9 (20 overs)	v	Burgher Recreation Club; 137/7 (19.3 overs)
Jeevan Mendis 36 (38); Duncan Arnolda 4/18 (3 overs)		Chinthaka Jayasinghe 46* (28); Nuwan Zoysa 3/10 (4 overs)

Burgher won by 3 wickets
Nondescripts Cricket Club Ground
Umpires: D De Silva

- Sinhalese Sports Club, who chose to bat
- Manoj Mendis, Thushira Madanayake, Sanjeewa Silva, Dhanuka Pathirana, Roshan Weerasinghe, Rohan Soysa, Chinthaka Jayasinghe, Duncan Arnolda, Sanjeewa de Silva, Priyankara Silva, Sajeewa Weerakoon (Burgher Recreation Club); Avishka Gunawardene, Nuwan Zoysa, Mahela Jayawardene, Chamara Silva, Jeevan Mendis, Malin Silva, Hemantha Wickramaratne, Charith Sylvester, Thilan Samaraweera, Dilhara Fernando, and Dinuka Hettiarachchi (Sinhalese Sports Club) all made their T20 debuts.

17 August 2004
Scorecard

Chilaw Marians Cricket Club; 198/9 (20 overs)	v	Galle Cricket Club; 110 (17.3 overs)
Ishan Mutaliph 60 (33); Indika de Saram 4/34 (3 overs)		Asela Wewalwala 24 (25); Ranil Dhammika 3/16 (2.3 overs)

Chilaw won by 88 runs
Police Park Ground
Umpires: S.H. Sarathkumara and Lalith Jayasundara

- Chilaw Marians, who chose to bat
- Arosha Perera, Ishan Mutaliph, Gayan Wijekoon, Hasantha Fernando, Praneth Jayasundera, Dilruwan Perera, Malintha Gajanayake, Nimesh Perera, Janaka Gunaratne, and Ranil Dhammika (Chilaw Marians); Primal Buddika, Kasun Bodhisha, Ruchira Karunasena, Indika de Saram, Chamil Perera, Ruwan Galappathy, Asela Wewalwala, Duminda Wickramasinghe, Saliya Saman, Pradeep Kumara, and Chathura Athukorala (Galle Cricket Club) made their T20 debuts.

17 August 2004
Scorecard

Colombo Cricket Club; 200/9 (20 overs)	v	Panadura Sports Club; 115 (16 overs)
Damitha Hunukumbura 77 (40); Ruchira Palliyaguruge 2/45 (4 overs)		Anjula Perera 35 (39); Suresh Perera 3/13 (2 overs)

Colombo Cricket Club won by 85 runs
Police Park Ground
Umpires: Gamini Dissanayake and Sena Nandiweera

- Panadura, who chose to field
- Michael Vandort, Damitha Hunukumbura, Jehan Mubarak, Anushka Polonowita, Suresh Perera, Nisal Randika, Ganganath Ratnayake, Lanka de Silva, Charitha Buddhika, Nisitha Rupasinghe, Sujeewa de Silva (Colombo Cricket Club), Dinidu Marage, Anjula Perera, Sammika Ruwan, Rasika Fernando, Mudith Buddika, Ruchira Palliyaguruge, Madura Lakmal, Sanjeewa Roshan, Chamath Perera, Aruna Bandaranayake and Malinga Surappulige (Panadura Sports Club) all made their T20 debuts

17 August 2004
Scorecard

Sri Lanka Air Force Sports Club; 102 (16.1 overs)	v	Colts Cricket Club; 106/2 (14.1 overs)
Abuthahir Rizan 14 (14); Chanaka Komasaru 3/18 (3 overs)		Shantha Kalavitigoda 50* (48); Chamila Gamage 1/12 (3 overs)

Colts won by 8 wickets
Moors Sports Club Ground
Umpires: Rohitha Kottahachchi and Karunaratne Boteju

- Sri Lanka Air Force Sports Club, who chose to bat
- Kumara de Silva, Chaturan Sanjeewa, Samith Jayasuriya, Abuthahir Rizan, Charith Tissera, Nalin Wijesinghe, Ajith Kumara, Pubudu Wickrama, Chamila Gamage, Dinesh Manjula de Silva, Sagara Dananjaya (Sri Lanka Air Force Sports Club), Shantha Kalavitigoda, Romesh Kaluwitharana, Harsha Vithana, Rashan Peiris, Dulip Samaraweera, Ranesh Perera, Dulip Liyanage, Nuwan Kulasekara, Eric Upashantha, Pramuka Sudesh and Chanaka Komasaru (Colts Cricket Club) all made their T20 debuts.

17 August 2004
Scorecard

Kurunegala Youth Cricket Club; 166/6 (20 overs)	v	Sebastianites Cricket and Athletic Club; 136/4 (18.5 overs)
Muditha Fernando 55 (30); Suranjith Silva 2/25 (4 overs)		Amila Sandaruwan 47 (28); Ajith Ekanayake 4/13 (3 overs)

Kurunegala Youth Cricket Club won by 76 runs
Colts Cricket Club Ground
Umpires: Rohana de Silva and Ranmore Martinesz

- Kurunegala Youth Cricket Club, who chose to bat
- Dilan Ramanayake, Rashantha Sureshchandra, Muditha Fernando, Amith Jayaratne, Mohamed Ramzi, Ajith Ekanayake, Saman Priyanthaka, Tharaka Samaratunga, Wasantha Kumara, Damith Gunatilleke, Muditha Maduwantha (Kurunegala Youth Cricket Club), Nuwan Shiroman, Amila Sandaruwan, Geeth Silva, Janaka Siriwardane, Pubudu Seneviratne, Dinusha Fernando, Sudeep Perera, Suranjith Silva, Sumalka Perera, Tharindu Fernando and Janaka Wannakuwatta (Sebastianites Cricket and Athletic Club) all made their T20 debuts.

17 August 2004
Scorecard

Moors Sports Club; 125 (18.5 overs)	v	Ragama Cricket Club; 110/8 (20 overs)
Hemantha Boteju 31 (21); Chanaka Wijesinghe 3/24 (3.5 overs)		Upul Fernando 32 (47); Ashan Ranaweera 2/15 (3 overs)

Moors won by 15 runs
Nondescripts Cricket Club Ground
Umpires: Grashan Liyanage and Atula Senanayake

- Ragama Cricket Club, who chose to field
- Dhammika Sudarshana, Heshan Tillakaratne, Hemantha Boteju, Ashan Ranaweera, Wesley Fernando, Dilhara Lokuhettige, Rangana Herath, Roy Silva, Thamara Abeyratne, Subodha Jayawardene, Chanaka Welegedara (Moors Sports Club), Chanaka Withanage, Upul Fernando, Chanaka Wijesinghe, Dhushantha Ranatunga, Sunendra Kumara, Gihan Fernando, Upul Indrasiri, Duminda Perera, Ruwan Dilruk, Nuwan Quintaz and Dinesh Daminda (Ragama Cricket Club) all made their T20 debuts.

17 August 2004
Scorecard

Nondescripts Cricket Club; 164/8 (20 overs)	v	Tamil Union Cricket and Athletic Club; 147/5 (20 overs)
Kumar Sangakkara 39 (21); Niroshana Amarasinghe 3/28 (3 overs)		Nandika Ranjith 56* (29); Thilan Thushara 2/23 (4 overs)

Nondescripts won by 17 runs
Moors Sports Club Ground
Umpires: C. B. C. Rodrigo

- Tamil Union Cricket and Athletic Club, who chose to field
- Kanchana Gunawardene, Naveed Nawaz, Kumar Sangakkara, Upul Chandana, Russel Arnold, Prasanna Jayawardene, Ravindra Pushpakumara, Thilan Thushara, Chamikara Mudalige, Sudheera De Zoysa, Lasith Malinga (Nondescripts Cricket Club), Nimesh Perera, Nayantha Weeraman, Rally Tissera, Ranga Dias, Sandun Dias, Mevan Fernando, Nandika Ranjith, Niroshana Amarasinghe, Lassana Dias, Pradeep Jeyapragash and Sagara Kumara (Tamil Union Cricket and Athletic Club) all made their T20 debuts.

== Knockout stage ==
=== Quarter Final 1 ===
2 September 2004
Scorecard

Kurunegala Youth Cricket Club; 120/6 (20 overs)	v	Bloomfield Cricket and Athletic Club; 121/5 (18 overs)
Sameera de Zoysa 31 (38); Muditha Fernando 26 (31); Sanath Jayasuriya 2/20 (4 overs); Tillakaratne Sampath 1/7 (1 over)		Kumar Dharmasena 36* (37); Kaushal Lokuarachchi 31 (26); Muditha Maduwantha 3/28 (4 overs); Ajith Ekanayake 2/17 (4 overs)

Bloomfield won by 5 wickets
R. Premadasa Stadium
Umpires: Asoka De Silva(SL)and Billy Bowden(NZ)

- Bloomfield, who chose to field

=== Quarter Final 2 ===
2 September 2004
Scorecard

Nondescripts Cricket Club; 134 (18.3 overs)	v	Colts Cricket Club; 135/6 (19.2 overs)
Kumar Sangakkara 39 (17); Naveed Nawaz 33 (34); Mohan Wickramasinghe 4/19 (4 overs); Muthumudalige Pushpakumara 3/20 (4 overs)		Shantha Kalavitigoda 38 (31); Romesh Kaluwitharana 37 (26); Sudheera De Zoysa 1/11 (3 overs); Thilan Thushara 1/20 (4 overs)

Colts won by 4 wickets
R. Premadasa Stadium
Umpires: Sundaram Ravi(IND) and Billy Bowden(NZ)

- Nondescripts, who chose to bat

=== Quarter Final 3 ===
2 September 2004
Scorecard

Colombo Cricket Club; 114 (18.3 overs)	v	Chilaw Marians Cricket Club; 115/5 (17.4 overs)
Jehan Mubarak 23 (33); Damitha Hunukumbura 19 (22); Praneth Jayasundera 3/11 (2 overs); Manoj Chanaka 3/27 (4 overs)		Ishan Mutaliph 40 (36); Arosha Perera 22 (13); Jehan Mubarak 2/14 (1.4 overs); Nisitha Rupasinghe 1/21 (4 overs)

Chilaw won by 5 wickets
R. Premadasa Stadium
Umpires: Lalith Jayasundara and Dilshan de Silva

- Chilaw Marians Cricket Club, who chose to field

=== Quarter Final 4 ===
2 September 2004
Scorecard

Burgher Recreation Club; 129/8 (20 overs)	v	Moors Sports Club; 120 (19.2 overs)
Manoj Mendis 38 (34); Viraj Perera 22 (20); Rangana Herath 3/20 (4 overs); Amila Weththasinghe 3/26 (4 overs)		Bathiya Perera 43 (37); Dhammika Sudarshana 25 (33); Sajeewa Weerakoon 3/14 (3.2 overs); Priyankara Silva 1/23 (4 overs)

Colts won by 9 runs
R. Premadasa Stadium
Umpires: Philip Mendis and Saman Amerasinghe

- Burgher Recreation Club, who chose to bat

=== Semi Final 1 ===
3 September 2004
Scorecard

Chilaw Marians Cricket Club; 171/8 (20 overs)	v	Burgher Recreation Club; 113 (18.5 overs)
Arosha Perera 43 (28); Ishan Mutaliph 31 (32); Dhanuka Pathirana 3/29 (4 overs); Sajeewa Weerakoon 2/22 (4 overs)		Dhanuka Pathirana 30 (19); Sajeewa de Silva 20 (15); Dilruwan Perera 3/19 (2 overs); Gayan Wijekoon 3/23 (3 overs)

Chilaw won by 58 runs
R. Premadasa Stadium
Umpires: Ranmore Martinesz and Gamini Dissanayake

- Kandurata, who chose to field

=== Semi Final 2 ===
30 April 2008
Scorecard

Basnahira North; 113/9 (20 overs)	v	Ruhuna; 116/5 (15.3 overs)
Dhushantha Ranatunga 33 (34); Thilina Kandamby 30 (30); Thilina Kandamby 3/21 (3.3 overs); Muthumudalige Pushpakumara 2/16 (3 overs)		Dilhara Lokuhettige 53 (36); Indika de Saram 34 (23); Sujeewa de Silva 3/16 (4 overs); Sajeewa Weerakoon 3/20 (4 overs)

Ruhuna won by 5 wickets
Welagedara Stadium
Umpires: Sagara Gallage and Gamini Silva

- Ruhuna, who chose to field

=== Final ===
3 September 2004
Scorecard

Chilaw Marians Cricket Club; 227/6 (20 overs)	v	Colts Cricket Club; 124 (12.5 overs)
Malintha Gajanayake 76 (40); Hasantha Fernando 58 (32); Romesh Kaluwitharana 2/24 (2 overs); Muthumudalige Pushpakumara 2/35 (4 overs)		Mohan Wickramasinghe 42 (25); Shantha Kalavitigoda 20 (10); Janaka Gunaratne 3/20 (2.5 overs); Manoj Chanaka 2/35 (3 overs)

Chilaw won by 103 runs
R. Premadasa Stadium
Umpires: Asoka de Silva and Tyron Wijewardene

- Chilaw Marians Cricket Club, who chose to bat
