= List of Uva representative cricketers =

This is a list of cricket players who have played representative cricket for Uva in Sri Lanka.

It includes players that have played at least one match, in senior First-Class, List A cricket, or Twenty20 matches. Practice matches are not included, unless they have officially been classified at First-class tour matches.

The Inter-Provincial Cricket Tournament is the premier domestic cricket competition in Sri Lanka. It was founded in 1990, however the Uva cricket team only participated in the 2003–04 edition called the 2003–04 Ten Sports Inter-Provincial Tournament. Uva have yet to play any Twenty20 cricket.

== First Class Players ==
All of the cricket players who have represented Uva in first class cricket in order of their appearance for the team:

1. Dhammika Sudarshana
2. Ian Daniel
3. Avishka Gunawardene
4. Naveed Nawaz
5. Anushka Polonowita
6. Upul Chandana
7. Rashan Peiris
8. Chaminda Vaas
9. Niroshan Bandaratilleke
10. Ravindra Pushpakumara
11. Chamila Gamage
12. Jeevantha Kulatunga
13. Malintha Gajanayake
14. Dilhara Lokuhettige
15. Muthumudalige Pushpakumara

== List 'A' Players ==
All of the cricket players who have represented Uva in List A cricket in order of their appearance for the team:

1. Tharanga Paranavitana
2. Mahela Udawatte
3. Ian Daniel
4. Kaushalya Weeraratne
5. Sameera de Zoysa
6. Dilhara Fernando
7. Lahiru Thirimanne
8. Malinga Bandara
9. Shaminda Eranga
10. Thilina Kandamby
11. Janaka Gunaratne
12. Indika de Saram
13. Milinda Siriwardene
14. Dinesh Daminda
15. Dinuka Hettiarachchi

== Twenty20 Players ==
Uva is yet to play any Twenty20 domestic competitions.
