= North Central Province cricket team =

Sri Lankan cricket team

Personnel
- Captain: Mahela Jayawardene

Team information
- Founded: 2004

History
- First-class debut: Ruhuna in 2004 at Galle International Stadium

North Central Province cricket team was a Sri Lankan first class cricket team that represents North Central Province. The team was established in 2004 and only featured in two Inter-Provincial First Class Tournaments, the 2003-04 and 2004-05, both of which they came second to Kandurata. The team was captained by Mahela Jayawardene.

== Players ==
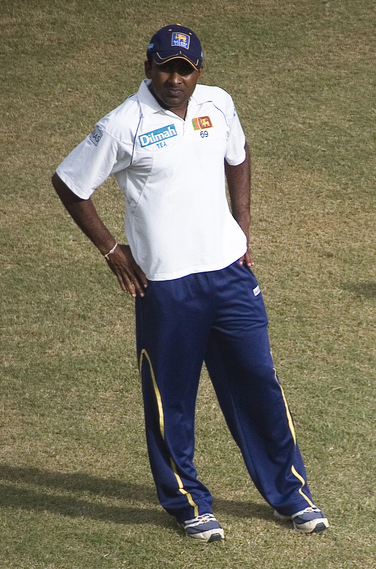
Mahela Jayawardene

=== Notable players ===
- Akalanka Ganegama
- Amila Wethathasinghe
- Chanaka Welagedara
- Charith Sylvester
- Dhanuka Pathirana
- Farveez Maharoof
- Gayan Wijekoon
- Janaka Gunaratne
- Kumar Dharmasena
- Lanka De Silva
- Mahela Jayawardene
- Manoj Mendis
- Nandika Ranjith
- Nuwan Kulasekara
- Omesh Wijesiriwardene
- Praneeth Jayasundera
- Rangana Herath
- Shantha Kalavitigoda
- Tillakaratne Dilshan

== Honours ==
=== Domestic ===
==== First Class ====
- Inter-Provincial First Class Tournament: 0

==== List A ====
- Inter-Provincial Limited Over Tournament: 0

==== Twenty20 ====
- Inter-Provincial Twenty20: 0
