= Bangladeshi cricket team in Sri Lanka in 2005 =

Bangladeshi cricket team in Sri Lanka in 2005–06
| | Sri Lanka | Bangladesh |
- Dates: 28 August – 24 September 2005
| Captains | Marvan Atapattu | Habibul Bashar |

Test series
- Result: Sri Lanka won the 2-match series 2–0
| Most runs | Tillakaratne Dilshan (254) | Habibul Bashar (124) |
| Most wickets | Muttiah Muralitharan 14 | Shahadat Hossain (6); Syed Rasel (6) |
- Player of the series: Tillakaratne Dilshan (SL)

One Day International series
- Results: Sri Lanka won the 3-match series 3–0
| Most runs | Upul Tharanga (174) | Shahriar Nafees (111) |
| Most wickets | Tillakaratne Dilshan (6); Farveez Maharoof (6) | Syed Rasel (3); Mohammad Rafique (3); Tapash Baisya (3) |
- Player of the series: Upul Tharanga (SL)

The Bangladeshi cricket team toured Sri Lanka for three One Day International cricket matches and two Test cricket matches in August and September 2005. The Bangladeshi team was coming off a moderately successful tour of England, as they had pushed Australia close in one ODI and beat them in another. However, they had still lost five out of six matches in the NatWest Series, both of the Test matches, and remained at the bottom of both the ICC Test Championship and ICC ODI Championship. The hosts Sri Lanka, meanwhile, were undefeated in home ODI tournaments since February 2004, and in home Test series since March 2004, both against top-ranked Australia. Their win in the Indian Oil Cup a month before this series saw them into second place in the ODI Championship, but they are only ranked sixth in Tests.

== Squads ==
| Tests | | ODIs | |
| Sri Lanka | Bangladesh | Sri Lanka | Bangladesh |
|---|---|---|---|
| Marvan Atapattu (c); Russel Arnold (wk); Tillakaratne Dilshan; Dilhara Fernando; H. M. R. K. B. Herath; Sanath Jayasuriya; Mahela Jayawardene; Shantha Kalavitigoda; Farveez Maharoof; Lasith Malinga; Muttiah Muralitharan; Thilan Samaraweera; Kumar Sangakkara (wk); Chaminda Vaas; Gayan Wijekoon | Habibul Bashar (c); Abdur Razzak; Aftab Ahmed; Aminul Islam Jnr; Enamul Haque; Khaled Mahmud; Khaled Mashud (wk); Javed Omar; Manjural Islam Rana; Mashrafe Mortaza; Mohammad Ashraful; Mohammad Rafique; Nafees Iqbal; Nazmul Hossain; Rajin Saleh; Tapash Baisya; Tushar Imran; Shahadat Hossain; Shahriar Nafees; Syed Rasel | Marvan Atapattu (c); Russel Arnold; Upul Chandana; Tillakaratne Dilshan; Dilhara Fernando; Avishka Gunawardene; Sanath Jayasuriya; Mahela Jayawardene; Dilhara Lokuhettige; Farveez Maharoof; Muttiah Muralitharan; Thilan Samaraweera; Kumar Sangakkara (wk); Upul Tharanga; Chaminda Vaas | Habibul Bashar (c); Abdur Razzak; Aftab Ahmed; Aminul Islam Jnr; Khaled Mahmud; Khaled Mashud (wk); Javed Omar; Manjural Islam Rana; Mashrafe Mortaza; Mohammad Ashraful; Mohammad Rafique; Nazmul Hossain; Rajin Saleh; Tapash Baisya; Tushar Imran; Shahriar Nafees; Syed Rasel |

== Scheduled matches ==
- 4 September: Third One-Day International, R. Premadasa Stadium, Colombo
- 7–9 September: Warm-up two-innings match, Colts Cricket Club Ground, Colombo
- 12–16 September: First Test, R. Premadasa Stadium, Colombo
- 20–24 September: Second Test, P. Saravanamuttu Stadium, Colombo

== Matches played ==
=== Sri Lanka Cricket XI v Bangladesh, 28 August ===
Sri Lanka Cricket XI won by ten wickets

A slow start by openers Rajin Saleh and Javed Omar cost Bangladesh dearly in the warm-up match against a side of Sri Lankan fringe players at Moratuwa, along with an inability to take wickets. The pair added 59 for the first wicket, but never really got off the mark, and when Pradeep Jayaprakashdaran dismissed Omar and Aftab Ahmed in quick succession things started to look tricky. The other players were forced to make runs quickly, and two run outs followed as a result. In the end, it was the experienced all-rounders Mohammad Rafique and Khaled Mashud who ensured that Bangladesh set a somewhat competitive target of 236. However, Avishka Gunawardene and Upul Tharanga both made centuries, and the Bangladeshi bowlers were thoroughly hit around. Sri Lanka made their way to 236 for 0 in just 36.1 overs of the possible 50. To add insult to injury, Mashrafe Mortaza suffered a back spasm and was ruled out of the first ODI. Cricinfo scorecard

== ODI series ==
=== 1st ODI ===
31 August 2005
Scorecard

| Sri Lanka; 269/9 (50 overs) | v | Bangladesh; 181/9 (50 overs) |
| Upul Tharanga 60 (80); Syed Rasel 2/42 (10 Overs) | | Shahriar Nafees 39 (59); Farveez Maharoof 3/29 (7 overs) |

Sri Lanka won by 88 runs
Sinhalese Sports Club Ground, Colombo
Umpires: Asad Rauf (Pak) and Asoka de Silva (SL)
Player of the match: Mahela Jayawardene

- Bangladesh won the toss and elected to field.
- Syed Rasel (Ban) made his ODI debut

Bangladesh won the toss in the first of three matches, and under cloudy skies they chose to bowl first, putting faith in his newly composed seam bowling attack of Tapash Baisya and Syed Rasel with the new ball. However, the pair leaked runs during the first eight overs, and the score was 51 for 0 when Baisya ran in to bowl his fifth over of the day and Bangladesh's ninth. However, Sanath Jayasuriya was bowled by an inswinging delivery from Baisya for 25, and that slowed Sri Lanka down. Baisya even bowled a maiden over as the Sri Lankans chose to wait out the middle overs and set the platform for big hitting at the end - which worked perfectly.

Aftab Ahmed, the batsman used as an all-rounder with his medium pace in ODIs, got a bit of movement in the conditions, and that helped him to take two wickets - those of Tharanga and Kumar Sangakkara. However, he also bowled five wides in the process, and one of them even went to the boundary for four runs. Ahmed conceded 55 runs off his ten overs, and the two wickets did not help Bangladesh much, as Mahela Jayawardene and Russel Arnold helped themselves to boundaries as the innings neared a close. Spinner Mohammad Rafique toiled for Bangladesh, but could only get one wicket for plenty of runs, although a stumping chance went begging earlier on. Arnold was run out at the end of the 43rd over, though, and Manjural Islam Rana got a wicket with his last delivery of the day, as the new batsman Tillakaratne Dilshan swept a top edge to Syed Rasel down the leg side. The wickets slowed Sri Lanka down somewhat, but only temporarily, as Jayawardene quickly got on top of the bowling again. In the final over of Sri Lanka's innings, three wickets fell, Jayawardene eventually being run out having added 50 runs in an hour. Sri Lanka closed on 269 for 9.

A crowd of a couple of hundred saw Bangladesh's opening batsman Javed Omar hit three boundaries in the opening overs, but he was run out by Russel Arnold, and from then on, Bangladesh lost wickets regularly. No partnership passed 30 until that of the very last wicket, by which time it was all too late. Dilhara Fernando started the procession, deceiving Tushar Imran and Mohammad Ashraful to send them back for single-figure scores, and joint top-scorer Shahriar Nafees was fourth to fall, giving a return catch to Dilshan. Following Nafees' dismissal, Bangladesh quickly crashed to 103 for 8, with fast bowler Farveez Maharoof taking three wickets. Eventually, Bangladesh needed 143 for the last wicket off 98 deliveries, and Khaled Mashud and Tapash Baisya opted to block out the overs instead - while the Sri Lankan captain gave the ball to his spinners to get the match over with quickly, the three seamers Chaminda Vaas, Fernando and Maharoof only bowling 20 of a possible 30 overs. Cricinfo scorecard

=== 2nd ODI ===
2 September 2005
Scorecard

| Sri Lanka; 295/5 (50 overs) | v | Bangladesh; 220/6 (50 overs) |
| Upul Tharanga 105 (110); Mohammad Rafique 2/47 (10 overs) | | Shahriar Nafees 51 (83); Tillakaratne Dilshan 3/17 (7 overs) |

Sri Lanka won by 75 runs
R. Premadasa Stadium, Colombo
Umpires: Asad Rauf (Pak) and Tyron Wijewardene (SL)
Player of the match: Upul Tharanga (SL)

- Bangladesh won the toss and elected to field.

Upul Tharanga made another big score as Sri Lanka once again batted Bangladesh out of the game. The left-hander, who had a disappointing run in the Indian Oil Cup a month earlier, now hit plenty of boundaries into the off side, as he and Sanath Jayasuriya flayed the Bangladeshi pacers Tapash Baisya, Syed Rasel and Nazmul Hossain. Admittedly, Tharanga had a slice of luck early on, as Manjural Islam Rana dropped him at slip on 13, but he never failed from there. In the opening 15 overs, Tharanga and Jayasuriya added 100 runs, before Jayasuriya finally edged a short-pitched ball behind to wicket-keeper Khaled Mashud. A slower period followed, as number 3 Dilshan was more cautious against the seam bowlers, spending an hour at the crease but only making 27. Tharanga, however, accumulated singles well off the spinners, keeping the run rate well above five an over to end with 105 before Rana got his revenge - Tharanga came down the pitch to Rana, but missed the ball, and was stumped by Masud.

The Bangladeshi bowlers bowled patiently, but the poor start had cost them badly, and it went from bad to worse when Nazmul limped off in his seventh over. He was eventually substituted for Tushar Imran, while Aftab Ahmed took over his bowling duties. Neither could contain the Sri Lankans, though, as the captain Marvan Atapattu and wicket-keeper Kumar Sangakkara took Sri Lanka past 200 with 11 overs to go. Sangakkara eventually fell to Rafique, and in the next over Syed Rasel got rid of pinch hitter Dilhara Lokuhettige for 2, only to see Mahela Jayawardene, the man of the last match, come in to partner Atapattu. The pair added 43 from the last 26 balls, Atapattu recording a whirlwind 53 while Jayawardene closed on 23.

The chase was never really on for Bangladesh, who kept their run rate steadily above 4 an over but had to see the required rate explode to nearly nine an over. When that happened in the 28th over, and the score was at 121 for 2, the Bangladeshis tried to hit out, and duly lost three wickets to Dilshan's off spin. Shahriar Nafees was first to fall to Dilshan's spin, having made his second ODI fifty in six games, while Rafique and Ashraful followed shortly afterwards. Forced onto the back foot with the score 140 for 5, Bangladesh put on substitute Tushar Imran, who joined in a partnership of 71 with Bashar in 13 overs. However, the pair scored too slowly to have any chance of winning, instead just trying to save face. Sri Lanka saved their pace bowlers again, opting for Dilshan, Upul Chandana and even the medium pace of Mahela Jayawardene, as they used eight of their eleven possible bowlers in the innings. Cricinfo scorecard

=== 3rd ODI ===
4 September 2005
Scorecard

| Bangladesh; 108 (38.2 overs) | v | Sri Lanka; 106/4 (21.2 overs) |
| Shahriar Nafees 21 (32); Dilhara Fernando 3/19 (8 overs) | | Avishka Gunawardene 52 (61); Tapash Baisya 2/27 (7 overs) |

Sri Lanka won by 6 wickets (D/L)
R. Premadasa Stadium, Colombo
Umpires: Asad Rauf (Pak) and Asoka de Silva (SL)
Player of the match: Dilhara Fernando (SL)

- Sri Lanka won the toss and elected to field.

Bangladesh failed to convert a promising start into a competitive total in the third and final ODI of the series, as Maharoof and Lokuhettige conceded 46 runs off the eight opening overs, despite bowling in friendly conditions with plenty of clouds. Lokuhettige was especially expensive, and was duly taken off for Dilhara Fernando, who got the breakthrough for Sri Lanka as Javed Omar was out lbw to Fernando. That started the slide. Maharoof continued from the other end, inducing catches from the bats of Rafique and Shahriar Nafees, and suddenly Bangladesh were staring down a familiar hole, the score 51 for 3 at the end of 10 overs.

Composure would be required from Aftab Ahmed and Mohammad Ashraful, but the pair lasted only one over, Fernando bowling a slower ball to Ashraful which he could not get bat on and was lbw for 0. Aftab Ahmed saw off six more balls before he, too, was lbw, misreading the line of a ball from Maharoof, and captain Bashar completed the procession by edging to Sangakkara for 1. In 26 deliveries, Bangladesh had only scored seven runs, and they had lost six wickets in the process. The primary task for Bangladesh now were to survive 48 overs (their innings had been shortened slightly due to bad light), but even that was too much of a challenge, as the spinners Upul Chandana and Tillakaratne Dilshan shared the four last wickets, all caught, to see Bangladesh all out for 108.

The chase of 106 - again cut down due to rain - was led by Avishka Gunawardene, who saw off the opening bowlers with relative ease, taking Rasel for runs while defending more against the experienced Baisya - who dug out two wickets, those of Tharanga and pinch-hitter Lokuhettige. However, he did not get any further wickets, and Bangladesh were put to the sword by Gunawardene before Rafique and Mahmud calmed him down as he neared fifty. After four overs without boundaries, Gunawardene brought up his fifty with one edged through third man, before pulling a short ball straight to Tushar Imran who held the catch comfortably. Yet, Sri Lanka still needed 22 runs for the victory, with seven wickets in hand and one of their most experienced batsmen in Kumar Sangakkara at the crease. In the 21st over, Sangakkara levelled the scores with two big leg side shots that went for four, before calling a risky single that had Thilan Samaraweera run out for 18. Nevertheless, it was all too late, as Sangakkara wrapped it up by hitting a single to midwicket. Cricinfo scorecard

=== Sri Lanka Development XI v Bangladeshis, 7–9 September ===
Match drawn

Sri Lanka's Development XI, strengthened by internationals Thilan Samaraweera and Gayan Wijekoon who was picked to get match practice before the Tests, dominated the three-day, 12-a-side game with Bangladesh, but could not force a victory. Winning the toss and bowling first, the Development XI got off to a good start, with Tharanga Lakshitha taking two wickets. Bangladesh crashed to 90 for 6, but Javed Omar fought back with an uncharacteristically quick 81, and he was also helped by Tapash Baisya who made 54. Nevertheless, Gayan Wijekoon and 19-year-old leg spinner Gihan Rupasinghe took three wickets each, as Bangladesh were all out for 197. Bangladesh then put in a lacklustre bowling effort, conceding 48 extras - 25 in no-balls - while Shantha Kalavitigoda, wicket-keeper Gihan de Silva and left-hander Jeewan Mendis made fifties. Four wickets from Syed Rasel helped little, as the Development XI made their way to 412. Bangladesh survived out the last day for a draw, however, despite crashing to 92 for 4, thanks to fifties from Mohammad Ashraful and Aftab Ahmed.

== Test series ==
=== 1st Test ===
12–14 September 2005
scorecard

| Bangladesh | v | Sri Lanka |
| 188 (44 overs); Habibul Bashar 84 (96); Rangana Herath 4/38 (12 overs) | | 370/9d (110.2 overs); Tillakaratne Dilshan 86 (124); Mohammad Rafique 5/114 (37 overs) |
| 86 (27.4 overs); Habibul Bashar 15 (29); Muttiah Muralitharan 6/18 (10.4 overs) |

Sri Lanka won by an innings and 96 runs
R. Premadasa Stadium, Colombo
Umpires: Asad Rauf (Pak) and Steve Bucknor (WI)
Player of the match: Muttiah Muralitharan (SL)

- Sri Lanka won the toss and elected to field.
- Shahriar Nafees and Syed Rasel (Ban) both made their Test debut

Bangladesh were given their eighth innings defeat in ten Test matches by Sri Lanka, losing after seven sessions of play in Colombo, despite a promising start. They lost Shahriar Nafees early, as he was bowled between bat and pad by Lasith Malinga, but Javed Omar made a gutsy 30, and Habibul Bashar got his second successive Test half-century, as Bangladesh made their way to 155 for 2.

Then, Bangladesh lost their heads. Ashraful attempted a big heave off Herath, but was caught by Dilhara Fernando in the deep. Two overs later, Tushar Imran was bowled by Herath, but the killing blow came with the next delivery. A throw from close in ran out Habibul Bashar - he had managed to get his bat over the line, but it bounced up and did not touch the ground when the ball hit the stumps. Bangladesh had lost three wickets for one run, and more was to come, as Muttiah Muralitharan and Herath took one wicket each within the space of six deliveries. At 158 for 7, Bangladesh batted for face, and debutant Syed Rasel tried with a streaky 19. He was last out, stumped off Herath, who ended with four for 38. In return, Sri Lanka played a bit more sedately, and none of their batsmen passed fifty in the 44 overs in their innings on day one, yet they only trailed 28 runs with seven wickets in hand.

Sri Lanka continued on their merry path in the second innings, as Mohammad Rafique and Enamul Haque toiled for the better part of the morning and afternoon sessions to little reward. A slow pitch rewarded gritty batting, as shown by Thilan Samaraweera's four-hour 78. Fifties also came from Mahela Jayawardene and Tillakaratne Dilshan - the latter was last out, missing an attempted pull shot as the ball from Rasel clattered into his stumps, bowled for 86. Rafique had cleaned up the lower order earlier, removing Chaminda Vaas, Herath and Muralitharan en route to his sixth five-wicket-haul of his career, but Dilhara Fernando had lasted for 30 minutes with Dilshan when Rasel broke through. With the score 370 for 9, Sri Lanka didn't bother to send the rabbit Lasith Malinga in to bat, and Marvan Atapattu declared.

Bangladesh were sent in to bat, and Lasith Malinga took one wicket in three expensive opening overs, but Shahriar Nafees and Habibul Bashar took the fight to the Sri Lankan seam bowlers. With the score 35 for 1 after 7 overs, Atapattu brought on off spinner Muralitharan - who had quietly taken three for 42 in the first innings - and he immediately delivered. His third ball to Shahriar was left alone, and clattered into the opener's stumps - out for 13. Mohammad Ashraful only lasted one ball, trapped lbw by the doosra. Rain then provided relief for the Bangladeshis, as the second day's play was ended prematurely, but they looked to struggle to another innings defeat.

Indeed, the third day became a nightmare. On a typical Sri Lankan turning track, Muralitharan finished with the fine figures of six for 18, as the Bangladeshis were bamboozled. Habibul Bashar started the procession with the ninth delivery of the day, which he edged to wicket-keeper Kumar Sangakkara, and from then on, only Khaled Mashud lasted for more than half an hour. He was also the only one to get into double figures, as Bangladesh were all out for 86, their lowest Test score of their five-year Test history to date. Cricinfo scorecard

=== 2nd Test ===
20–22 September 2005
Scorecard

| Sri Lanka | v | Bangladesh |
| 457/9d (92.3 overs); Tillakaratne Dilshan 168 (179); Shahadat Hossain 4/108 (20 overs) | | 191 (45.4 overs); Mohammad Ashraful 42 (41); Dilhara Fernando 5/60 (10 overs) |
| | | 197 (60.4 overs) (f/o); Shahriar Nafees 51 (79); Chaminda Vaas 3/36 (13 overs) |

Sri Lanka won by an innings and 69 runs
P. Sara Oval, Colombo
Umpires: Billy Bowden (NZ) and Steve Bucknor (WI)
Player of the match: Thilan Samaraweera (SL)

- Sri Lanka won the toss and elected to bat.
- Sanath Jayasuriya became the first Sri Lankan cricketer to play in 100 Test matches.

Bangladesh competed for half a session in the second Test, before crashing to a familiar innings defeat - their 24th in 40 Tests. In that first half-session, however, they showed a great deal of seam bowling competence. Their new ball bowlers Syed Rasel and Shahadat Hossain took two wickets each as Sri Lanka's top order struggled. It was Sri Lanka who had chosen to bat, but the Bangladeshis got some movement with the ball early on, and after Marvan Atapattu and Sanath Jayasuriya had added 28 for the first wicket, Shahadat struck in the sixth over.

First, he bowled a ball that Atapattu found prudent to leave alone, and nearly knocked down the off-stump of the Sri Lankan captain. Two balls later, a ball moving away from the batsman found the outside edge, and Atapattu was gone for 11. Jayasuriya was nearly run out in the next over, before perishing lbw, and Rasel and Shahadat then got two balls to nip back in and crash into the batsmen's stumps. In the space of 13 overs, Bangladesh had taken four wickets for 48 runs - only the second time in their five-year history that the first four wickets of their opponents had fallen for less than 50.

Thilan Samaraweera and Tillakaratne Dilshan battled well, however, adding 69 before lunch, although Dilshan benefitted from a dropped catch by Mohammad Ashraful. Ashraful and Bangladesh were to pay the highest price for this let-off. After lunch, the seamers were nowhere near as effective, and Dilshan plundered runs with ease. Bangladesh's spinners, Mohammad Rafique and Enamul Haque jnr were ineffective as Dilshan and Samaraweera passed milestones with ease. The 100 partnership came up shortly after lunch, and then fifty for each individual, and Dilshan reached 133 not out by the end of the session, the partnership having added 220 for the fifth wicket - needing 14 in the evening session to overcome the previous Sri Lankan Test record for the fifth wicket, set against Bangladesh at the very same ground three years earlier.

They passed that record shortly after tea, and went on to add 280, before Dilshan nicked behind to Khaled Mashud and a stroke-filled three-and-a-half-hour innings came to an end. He recorded his highest Test score of his career to date, with 168. Samaraweera was out four short of his highest Test score, making 138, as Bangladesh got two wickets with the new ball - yet Sri Lanka had turned 48 for 4 to 449 for 7 in the space of two and a half sessions. Chaminda Vaas added insult to injury, smacking ten fours and a six to bring up 61 before the close of play, and he would begin the second day 13 short of his highest Test score.

Rasel ended that dream for Vaas, though, as the Sri Lankan dragged the ball into his stumps to be bowled for 65. Sri Lanka, once again, declared without giving Lasith Malinga the chance to bat, leaving Bangladesh 457 to hit for first-innings parity. It started well, as Javed Omar and Shahriar Nafees added 16 in 5 overs, but Shahriar edged a delivery from Malinga into the diving keeper's hands, and Habibul Bashar came in for a short visit at the crease. He managed 18, before he was caught off Dilhara Fernando, and Fernando went on to take three wickets as Bangladesh crawled to 80 for 4 at lunch. Only Mohammad Ashraful had passed 20 of the top five, but he did survive a close lbw shout on 14 due to Fernando bowling a no-ball.

Ashraful went on after lunch, making 42 before a slower ball from Fernando ended his 43-run stand with Aftab Ahmed, and after that, wickets fell quickly. Muttiah Muralitharan added three to his series tally, which now stood at 12, and eight people were caught in the Bangladeshi innings, which lasted 45.4 overs. It would have been even less but for a determined half-hour between Mashud and Enamul - the pair added 25 in 9 overs before Mashud was stumped shortly after tea. Bangladesh were asked to follow on, and once again gave up catches - Nafees Iqbal had been promoted to opener, and made 30 quickly, before giving up a leg side catch to Sangakkara. Earlier, Javed Omar and Habibul Bashar had been out to expansive shots for low scores, and once again it was down to Ashraful. He recorded 21 runs in the evening session, at an unusually slow pace, while Shahriar Nafees were left to hit the big shots, taking eight fours off the Sri Lankan bowlers as he moved to 51. Two balls before the close of play, however, he edged to Samaraweera at slip, giving Muralitharan another wicket, and Bangladesh closed on 131 for 4, still 135 short of Sri Lanka's first innings score.

Bangladesh's resistance lasted for 26.4 overs on the third morning, very similar to their effort in the first Test. Vaas broke through first, removing Ashraful and nightwatchman Shahadat in successive overs, as Bangladesh's last recognised batting partnership was in with the score 139 for 6. Aftab Ahmed and Khaled Mashud held out for 11 overs, but Rangana Herath took the wicket of Aftab and the last two batsmen, leaving Bangladesh all out for 197 - an improvement by 27 runs in the loss margin, but still a comprehensive defeat. (Cricinfo scorecard)
