= List of Wayamba representative cricketers =

This is a list of cricket players who have played representative cricket for Wayamba in Sri Lanka. Wayamba has also played as North Western Province.

The list includes players that have played at least one match, in senior First-Class, List A cricket, or Twenty20. Practice matches are not included, unless they have officially been classified at First-class tour matches.

The Inter-Provincial Cricket Tournament is the premier domestic cricket competition in Sri Lanka. It was founded in 1990.

== First Class Players ==
All of the cricket players who have represented Wayamba in first class cricket in order of their appearance for the team:

- 1. Sanjaya Gunaratne
- 2. Thilan Wijesinghe
- 3. Chandika Hathurusingha
- 4. Sudarshana Guruge
- 5. Jehan Jaymon
- 6. Suranjith Dharmasena
- 7. Mahinda Jayaratne
- 8. Ranjith Madurasinghe
- 9. Manjula Gunasekera
- 10. Ranjith Amunugama
- 11. Sanjaka Wijemanne
- 12. Upali Seneratne
- 13. Ananda Bandaranayake
- 14. Ajith Ekanayake
- 15. Wasantha Kumara
- 16. Roshan Mahanama
- 17. Jeevantha Kulatunga
- 18. Eric Upashantha
- 19. Nishantha Munasinghe
- 20. S. S. W. Gunawardene
- 21. Presley Polonowita
- 22. Priyankara Liyanage
- 23. Chaminda Liyanage
- 24. Roshan Jaymon
- 25. Lanka de Silva
- 26. Chalitha Ratnayake
- 27. Thushita Herath
- 28. Vinod Samarawickreme
- 29. Muzammil Zahir
- 30. Uddika Bandaranayake
- 31. Viarnie Peiris
- 32. Malika Hunukumbura
- 33. Michael Vandort
- 34. Mahela Udawatte
- 35. Damitha Hunukumbura
- 36. Jehan Mubarak
- 37. Kaushal Lokuarachchi
- 38. Tissara Perera
- 39. Shalika Karunanayake
- 40. Chanaka Welagedara
- 41. Ishara Amerasinghe
- 42. Rangana Herath
- 43. Sameera de Zoysa
- 44. Isuru Udana
- 45. Kushal Perera
- 46. Madura Lakmal
- 47. Chathura Peiris
- 48. Rakitha Wimaladarma
- 49. Madura Perera
- 50. Chanaka Wijesinghe
- 51. Farveez Maharoof
- 52. Ravindra Palleguruge

== List 'A' Players ==
All of the Players who have represented Wayamba in List A cricket domestic one day competitions:

- 1. Michael Vandort
- 2. Mahela Udawatte
- 3. Lanka de Silva
- 4. Mahela Jayawardene
- 5. Jehan Mubarak
- 6. Jeevantha Kulatunga
- 7. Shalika Karunanayake
- 8. Rangana Herath
- 9. Ajantha Mendis
- 10. Chanaka Welagedara
- 11. Ishara Amerasinghe
- 12. Farveez Maharoof
- 13. Kaushal Lokuarachchi
- 14. Sameera de Zoysa
- 15. Isuru Udana
- 16. Tissara Perera
- 17. Kushal Perera
- 18. Dilshan Munaweera
- 19. Dimuth Karunaratne
- 20. Dinesh Chandimal
- 21. Sachithra Senanayake
- 22. Arosh Janoda
- 23. Thilan Samaraweera
- 24. Bhanuka Rajapaksa
- 25. Charith Jayampathi
- 26. Rumesh Buddika
- 27. Gayan Wijekoon
- 28. Sahan Wijeratne
- 29. Dhanushka Gunathilleke
- 30. Madura Lakmal
- 31. Dammika Kariyawasam

== Twenty20 Players ==
All of the Players who have represented Wayamba in Twenty20 domestic competitions:

- 1. Lanka de Silva
- 2. Damitha Hunukumbura
- 3. Sameera de Zoysa
- 4. Jeevantha Kulatunga
- 5. Suresh Perera
- 6. Thisara Perera
- 7. Shalika Karunanayake
- 8. Rangana Herath
- 9. Madura Lakmal
- 10. Chanaka Welegedara
- 11. Himesh Silva
- 12. Michael Vandort
- 13. Mahela Udawatte
- 14. Jehan Mubarak
- 15. Asela Jayasinghe
- 16. Ajantha Mendis
- 17. Mahela Jayawardene
- 18. Kaushal Lokuarachchi
- 19. Isuru Udana
- 20. Farveez Maharoof
- 21. Kushal Perera
- 22. Thilan Samaraweera
- 23. Rumesh Buddika
- 24. Thilina Kandamby
- 25. Chamara Silva
- 26. Indika de Saram
- 27. Rushan Jaleel
- 28. Malinga Bandara
- 29. Kaushalya Weeraratne
- 30. Thilan Thushara
- 31. Sohan Boralessa
