= Chathura =

Chathura is a given name. Notable people with the name include:

- Chathura Alwis (fl. 2006), Sri Lankan journalist
- Chathura Athukorala (born 1984), Sri Lankan cricketer
- Chathura Gunaratne (born 1982), Sri Lankan footballer
- Chathura Lakshan (born 1995), Sri Lankan cricketer
- Chathura Milan (born 1998), Sri Lankan cricketer
- Chathura Obeyesekere (born 1998), Sri Lankan cricketer
- Chathura Peiris (born 1990), Sri Lankan cricketer
- Chathura Randunu (born 1984), Sri Lankan cricketer
- Chathura Samantha (born 1987), Sri Lankan cricketer
- Chathura Senaratne (born 1982), Sri Lankan politician

== See also ==
- Chathura Yukam, Ayyavazhi concepts
