= Pubudu =

Pubudu is a given name. Notable people with the name include:

- Pubudu Chandrasekara (born 1981), Sri Lankan cricketer
- Pubudu Chathuranga (born 1982), Sri Lankan actor
- Pubudu Dassanayake (born 1970), Sri Lanka-born Canadian cricketer
- Pubudu Hasanka (born 1991), Sri Lankan cricketer
- Pubudu Seneviratne (born 1980), Sri Lankan cricketer
- Pubudu Wickrama (born 1980), Sri Lankan cricketer
