= Gihan =

Gihan is a given name. Notable people with the name include:

- Gihan de Silva (born 1985), Sri Lankan cricketer
- Gihan de Zoysa (born 1997), Sri Lankan cricketer
- Gihan Fernando (born 1967), Sri Lankan actor
- Gihan Fernando (cricketer) (born 1980), Sri Lankan cricketer
- Gihan Kamel, Egyptian physicist
- Gihan Koralage (born 1997), Sri Lankan cricketer
- Gihan Kulatunga, Sri Lankan puisne justice of the Supreme Court
- Gihan Premachandra (born 1980), Sri Lankan cricketer
- Gihan Rupasinghe (born 1986), Sri Lankan cricketer
- Gihan Wikramanayake (1960–2018), Sri Lankan academic
