= Duminda =

Duminda is a given name. Notable people with the name include:

- Duminda Dassanayake (born 1988), Sri Lankan cricketer
- Duminda Dissanayake (born 1979), Sri Lankan politician
- Duminda Perera (born 1979), Sri Lankan cricketer
- Duminda Silva (born 1974), Sri Lankan politician
- Duminda Wickramasinghe (born 1968), Sri Lankan cricketer
- Duminda Wijesekera, Sri Lankan computer scientist
