= List of Matara Sports Club cricketers =

List of first-class cricketers by club

This is an incomplete list in alphabetical order of cricketers who have played for Matara Sports Club in top-class (Note: Top-class matches are first-class, List A, and Twenty20.) matches since the club initially achieved List A status in 1990.

== Key ==
- † preceding a player's name means that the original article is now a redirect to this list.

== A ==
- Tharanga Abeysinghe

== B ==
- Charitha Bandaratilleke
- Boduge Buddika

== C ==
- Hewage Chaminda
- Visura Chinthaka

== D ==
- P. de Silva
- Nalin Dissanayake

== F ==
- Farhath Farook
- Shihabdeen Faumi
- Upul Fernando

== G ==
- Nalin Guruge

== J ==
- P. I. W. Jayasekera
- Asela Jayasinghe
- Tharanga Jayasinghe
- R. Jothimuni

== K ==
- Sathpath Kalum
- Chanaka Komasaru
- Sujith Kulatunga

== L ==
- SW Lakshika
- Tharanga Lakshitha
- Gayal Lanka
- Ajantha Lankatilleke
- Imal Liyanage
- Isuru Lokuge

== M ==
- S. Manuratne
- Amila Mendis
- Romesh Mendis
- Suminda Mendis
- Tushara Munasinghe

== N ==
- Wickramage Nadiranga
- Jagath Nandakumar
- Ravin Nirmal
- Pradeep Nishantha
- Prabath Nissanka

== P ==
- Charith Palliyage
- Rasika Priyadarshana
- Iresh Priyantha

== R ==
- Anushka Ramanayake
- C. Ramanayake
- Mohamed Ramzan
- Pulasthi Rangana

== S ==
- Primal Salgado
- Prabath Sanjeewa
- Atula Sedara
- Wasantha Shantha
- Priyantha Siriwardene
- Lasitha Suwandaratne

== T ==
- Nandana Tharanga
- Heshan Tillakaratne

== W ==
- Don Waidyaratne
- R. B. Weerappuli
- Nadeesh Wickramasekera
