= Tharindu Fernando (Sri Lankan cricketer) =

Sri Lankan cricketer

Personal information
- Full name: Muthuthatrige Tharindu Dhananjaya Fernando
- Born: 14 June 1984 (age 42); Panadura, Sri Lanka
- Batting: Left-handed
- Bowling: Left-arm fast-medium
- Role: Bowler

Domestic team information
- Years: Team
- 2004: Sebastianites
- 2004–2007: Nondescripts

Career statistics
Competition	FC	LA	T20
Matches	3	6	1
Runs scored	0	15	6
Batting average	–	7.50	6.00
100s/50s	0/0	0/0	0/0
Top score	0*	7	6
Balls bowled	167	204	12
Wickets	1	4	0
Bowling average	81.00	37.75	–
5 wickets in innings	0	0	–
10 wickets in match	0	0	–
Best bowling	1/21	2/38	–
Catches/stumpings	1/–	2/–	2/–
- Source: CricketArchive, 8 May 2015

Muthuthatrige Tharindu Dhananjaya Fernando (born 14 June 1984) is a former Sri Lankan cricketer. He played several seasons in Sri Lankan domestic competitions during the mid-2000s, with first-class and list-A appearances for Nondescripts and a single Twenty20 appearance for Sebastianites.

A left-arm fast bowler born in Panadura, Fernando attended S. Thomas' College, Mount Lavinia, and featured in the annual Royal–Thomian fixture in three separate years (2001, 2002, and 2003). His first appearance at a high level came in August 2004, when he appeared for Sebastianites in the inaugural season of the Twenty20 Challenge Trophy. His team were eliminated in the first round, with his two overs going for 23 runs. Fernando made his debut for Nondescripts the following month, in the one-day Premier Limited Overs Tournament, and later in the season made his first-class debut, against Air Force SC in the Premier Trophy. He continued to make sporadic appearances for Nondescripts' senior side over the following seasons, with his last senior appearance being a limited-overs match in November 2007. Earlier in the 2007–08 season, against Bloomfield Cricket and Athletic, he had dismissed both of Bloomfield's openers (Tillakaratne Dilshan and Saman Jayantha, both international players) to finish with 2/38 from nine overs, career-best figures.
