= Pramuka =

Pramuka may refer to:

- Gerakan Pramuka Indonesia, an Indonesian scout movement
- Pramuka Island, an island in Jakarta, Indonesia
- Pramuka Sudesh, Sri Lankan cricketer

== See also ==
- Pramukh Swami Maharaj, Indian Hindu saint
- Parmukh Singh Hoogan, Indian-Tanzanian politician
