= Abeyratne =

Abeyratne or Abeyrathne (Sinhala: අබේරත්න, romanized: Abēratna) is both a Sinhalese given name and a surname. Notable people with the name include:

== Given name ==
- Abeyratne Cudah Leonard Ratwatte (1909–1971), Ceylonese politician and diplomat
- Abeyratne Pilapitiya (1925–2025), Sri Lankan politician
- Abeyratne Ratnayaka (1900–1977), Sri Lankan politician
- Wilfred Abeyratne Ratwatte, Ceylonese politician

== Surname ==
- Ajith Abeyratne (1948–2023), Sri Lankan rugby union player
- Anoka Primrose Abeyrathne, Lankan conservationist, social entrepreneur, and activist
- Damitha Abeyratne (born 1975), Sri Lankan film actor
- Gayanthika Abeyratne (born 1986), Sri Lankan athlete
- Kasun Abeyrathne (born 1998), Sri Lankan cricketer
- Lasith Abeyratne (born 1993), Sri Lankan cricketer
- Sherine Abeyratne, Australian female singer (member of Big Pig)
- Thamara Abeyratne (born 1978), Sri Lankan cricketer
- Zan Abeyratne (born 1961), Australian female singer (member of I'm Talking)

== See also ==
- Chandana Abayarathna, Sri Lankan politician
