= Udara (name) =

Udara is both a given name and a surname. Notable people with the name include:

- Udara Jayasundera (born 1991), Sri Lankan cricketer
- Udara Palliyaguruge, Sri Lankan film director
- Udara Ranasinghe (born 1992), Sri Lankan cricketer
- Udara Rathnayake, Sri Lankan actor
- Udara Warna (born 1984), Sri Lankan cricketer
- Sachika Udara (born 1995), Sri Lankan cricketer
- Lahiru Udara (born 1993), Sri Lankan cricketer
