= Primal Buddika =

Sri Lankan cricketer (born 1979)

Personal information
- Full name: Merenchi Kankanamge Primal Buddika Kularatne
- Born: 24 March 1979 (age 47)
- Source: Cricinfo, 21 April 2021

Primal Buddika (born 24 March 1979) is a Sri Lankan former cricketer. He played in 85 first-class and 64 List A matches between 1998/99 and 2012/13. He made his Twenty20 debut on 17 August 2004, for Galle Cricket Club in the 2004 SLC Twenty20 Tournament.
