= Chamil Perera =

Sri Lankan cricketer (born 1979)

Personal information
- Full name: Induruwalage Chamil Dumidu Perera
- Born: 31 October 1979 (age 46)
- Source: Cricinfo, 21 April 2021

Chamil Perera (born 31 October 1979) is a Sri Lankan former cricketer. He played in 78 first-class and 46 List A matches between 2000/01 and 2009/10. He made his Twenty20 debut on 17 August 2004, for Galle Cricket Club in the 2004 SLC Twenty20 Tournament. Following his cricket career in Sri Lanka, he moved to the United States in 2014.
