= Sudeep Perera =

Sri Lankan cricketer (born 1979)

Personal information
- Full name: Warnakulasuriya Joe Sudeep Delantha Perera
- Born: 28 December 1979 (age 46)
- Source: Cricinfo, 23 April 2021

Sudeep Perera (born 28 December 1979) is a Sri Lankan former cricketer. He played in 63 first-class and 54 List A matches between 1999/00 and 2009/10. He made his Twenty20 debut on 17 August 2004, for Sebastianites Cricket and Athletic Club in the 2004 SLC Twenty20 Tournament.
