= Dilruk =

Dilruk is both a given name and a surname. Notable people with the name include:

- Dilruk Jayasinha (born 1985), Sri Lankan Australian comedian
- Ruwan Dilruk (born 1978), Sri Lankan cricketer
