= Hasantha Fernando =

Sri Lankan cricketer (born 1979)

Personal information
- Full name: Kandage Hasantha Ruwan Kumara Fernando
- Born: 14 October 1979 (age 47); Panadura, Sri Lanka
- Height: 5 ft 10 in (178 cm)
- Batting: Right-handed
- Bowling: Right-arm medium-fast

International information
- National side: Sri Lanka (2002–2006)
- Test debut (cap 93): 8 November 2002 v South Africa
- Last Test: 15 November 2002 v South Africa
- ODI debut (cap 110): 4 August 2002 v Bangladesh
- Last ODI: 22 February 2006 v Bangladesh

Career statistics
Competition	Test	ODI
Matches	2	7
Runs scored	38	43
Batting average	9.50	21.50
100s/50s	0/0	0/0
Top score	24	23*
Balls bowled	234	234
Wickets	4	6
Bowling average	27.00	26.50
5 wickets in innings	0	0
10 wickets in match	0	0
Best bowling	3/63	3/12
Catches/stumpings	1/–	1/–
- Source: Cricinfo, 23 February 2017

Kandage Hasantha Ruwan Kumara Fernando (born 14 October 1979), or Hasantha Fernando is a former Sri Lankan cricketer, who played two Test matches and 7 One Day Internationals. He is a right-handed batsman and a right-arm medium-fast bowler. He is a past student of Prince of Wales College, Moratuwa.

== Domestic career ==
He made his Twenty20 debut on 17 August 2004, for Chilaw Marians Cricket Club in the 2004 SLC Twenty20 Tournament.

He was the professional at Whitehaven Cricket Club in 2006 and he topped the league bowling averages.

After losing his place in the Sri Lankan team he went to English semi-pro team Plymouth where he made them contenders in the local 50 over league until he had a surprise call up for the Sri Lankan 20/20 team and became one of their crucial reserves. Plymouth later were promoted to the top league in the westcountry after 3 of their 4 teams were promoted in the 2007 season.

In 2011 he was the professional at Sudbury CC, where he helped the club keep their East Anglian Premier League status and rejoined them in the 2012 season.

== International cricket ==
After just one first-class season, spent with Sebastianites Cricket and Athletic Club, he impressed the selectors after having made three centuries, and was an ideal player to be picked for the 2003 Cricket World Cup. He made his one-day debut against Bangladesh, where his bowling was impressive. He was gentle in pace, but showed variation in line, length and style.
