= Ruwan Galappathy =

Sri Lankan cricketer (born 1978)

Personal information
- Full name: Chaminda Ruwan Prasad Galappathy
- Born: 30 January 1978 (age 48)
- Source: Cricinfo, 21 April 2021

Ruwan Galappathy (born 30 January 1978) is a Sri Lankan former cricketer. He played in 60 first-class and 42 List A matches between 1998/99 and 2006/07. He made his Twenty20 debut on 17 August 2004, for Galle Cricket Club in the 2004 SLC Twenty20 Tournament.
