= Maduwantha =

Maduwantha is a surname. Notable people with the surname include:

- Harith Maduwantha (born 1994), Sri Lankan cricketer
- Muditha Maduwantha (born 1979), Sri Lankan cricketer
- Promod Maduwantha (born 1997), Sri Lankan cricketer
