= Kasun Bodhisha =

Sri Lankan cricketer (born 1985)

Personal information
- Full name: Pathiranage Kasun Bodhisha
- Born: 13 September 1985 (age 40)
- Source: Cricinfo, 21 April 2021

Kasun Bodhisha (born 13 September 1985) is a Sri Lankan former cricketer. He played in 53 first-class and 43 List A matches between 2004/05 and 2012/13. He made his Twenty20 debut on 17 August 2004, for Galle Cricket Club in the 2004 SLC Twenty20 Tournament. He also played for Church and Oswaldtwistle Cricket Club in the Lancashire League in England during 2013.
