= Imal Liyanage =

Imal Liyanage can refer to:

- Imal Liyanage (cricketer, born 1977), Sri Lankan cricketer
- Imal Liyanage (cricketer, born 1994), Sri Lankan-born Qatari cricketer
