= Rasmi =

Rasmi is both a given name and a surname. Notable people with the name include:

- Rasmi Djabrailov (1932–2022), Russian actor
- Rasmi Jinan (born 1981), Sri Lankan former cricketer
- Raka Rasmi (1939–2018), Balinese dancer
