= Ranga Dias =

Ranga Dias may refer to:

- Ranga Dias (cricketer), a Sri Lankan cricketer
- Ranga Dias (physicist), a Sri Lankan physicist
