= Janaka Siriwardane =

Sri Lankan cricketer (born 1979)

Personal information
- Full name: Kasthuri Arachchige Don Janaka Siriwardene
- Born: 13 June 1979 (age 47)
- Source: Cricinfo, 23 April 2021

Janaka Siriwardane (born 13 June 1979) is a Sri Lankan former cricketer. He played in 43 first-class and 33 List A matches between 1998/99 and 2004/05. He made his Twenty20 debut on 17 August 2004, for Sebastianites Cricket and Athletic Club in the 2004 SLC Twenty20 Tournament.
