= Geeth Silva =

Sri Lankan cricketer (born 1984)

Personal information
- Born: 17 September 1984 (age 42)
- Source: Cricinfo, 14 March 2018

Geeth Silva (born 17 September 1984) is a Sri Lankan cricketer. He made his Twenty20 debut on 17 August 2004, for Sebastianites Cricket and Athletic Club in the 2004 SLC Twenty20 Tournament. He made his first-class debut for Sebastianites Cricket and Athletic Club in the 2007–08 Premier Trophy on 18 January 2008.
