= Withanage =

Withanage is a surname. Notable people with the surname include:

- Chanaka Withanage (born 1976), Sri Lankan cricketer
- Hesha Withanage, Sri Lankan politician
- Deshan Withanage (born 1997), Sri Lankan cricketer
- Madhura Withanage, Sri Lankan politician
