= Janaka Wannakuwatta =

Sri Lankan cricketer (born 1980)

Personal information
- Full name: Wannakuwatta Mitiwaduge Janaka Wannakuwatta
- Born: 9 July 1980 (age 46)
- Source: Cricinfo, 23 April 2021

Janaka Wannakuwatta (born 9 July 1980) is a Sri Lankan former cricketer. He played in 65 first-class and 59 List A matches between 1999/00 and 2008/09. He made his Twenty20 debut on 17 August 2004, for Sebastianites Cricket and Athletic Club in the 2004 SLC Twenty20 Tournament.
