= Amila Sandaruwan =

Sri Lankan cricketer (born 1984)

Personal information
- Full name: Mananadevage Amila Sandaruwan
- Born: 25 December 1984 (age 41)
- Source: Cricinfo, 23 April 2021

Amila Sandaruwan (born 25 December 1984) is a Sri Lankan former cricketer. He played in 43 first-class and 40 List A matches between 2003/04 and 2013/14. He made his Twenty20 debut on 17 August 2004, for Sebastianites Cricket and Athletic Club in the 2004 SLC Twenty20 Tournament.
