= Tharindu Fernando =

Tharindu Fernando may refer to:

- Tharindu Fernando (Italian cricketer) (born 1987), Italian cricketer of Sri Lankan origin
- Tharindu Fernando (Sri Lankan cricketer) (born 1984), Sri Lankan cricketer
