= Suranjith Silva =

Sri Lankan cricketer (born 1975)

Personal information
- Full name: Sella Hannadige Suranjith Madushan Kanchana Silva
- Born: 4 March 1975 (age 51)
- Source: Cricinfo, 23 April 2021

Suranjith Silva (born 4 March 1975) is a Sri Lankan former cricketer. He played in 127 first-class and 66 List A matches between 1993/94 and 2009/10. He made his Twenty20 debut on 17 August 2004, for Sebastianites Cricket and Athletic Club in the 2004 SLC Twenty20 Tournament.
