= Rohan Soysa =

Sri Lankan cricketer (born 1970)

Personal information
- Born: 30 November 1970 (age 54); Panadura, Sri Lanka
- Source: Cricinfo, 21 April 2021

Rohan Soysa (born 30 November 1970) is a Sri Lankan former cricketer. He played in 49 first-class and 14 List A matches between 1988/89 and 2004/05. He made his Twenty20 debut on 17 August 2004, for Burgher Recreation Club in the 2004 SLC Twenty20 Tournament. After his playing career, he became a cricket coach.
