= Saman Priyanthaka =

Sri Lankan cricketer (born 1983)

Personal information
- Full name: Gonawala Saman Priyanthaka Dharmapala
- Born: 14 March 1983 (age 43)
- Source: Cricinfo, 22 April 2021

Saman Priyanthaka (born 14 March 1983) is a Sri Lankan former cricketer. He played in 28 first-class and 22 List A matches between 2000/01 and 2012/13. He made his Twenty20 debut on 17 August 2004, for Kurunegala Youth Cricket Club in the 2004 SLC Twenty20 Tournament.
