= Nihal Zoysa =

Sri Lankan cricketer (born 1970)

Personal information
- Full name: Wijesekera Nihal Mahinda Zoysa
- Born: 9 April 1970 (age 56); Colombo, Ceylon
- Source: Cricinfo, 20 April 2021

Nihal Zoysa (born 9 April 1970) is a Sri Lankan former cricketer. He played in 141 first-class and 54 List A matches between 1988/89 and 2008/09. He made his Twenty20 debut on 17 August 2004, for Sri Lanka Police Sports Club in the 2004 SLC Twenty20 Tournament.
