= Nisitha Rupasinghe =

Sri Lankan cricketer (born 1979)

Personal information
- Born: 11 July 1979 (age 47); Kandy, Sri Lanka
- Source: Cricinfo, 3 April 2016

Nisitha Rupasinghe (born 11 July 1979) is a Sri Lankan former cricketer. He played first-class cricket for several domestic teams in Sri Lanka between 1998 and 2008. He made his Twenty20 debut on 17 August 2004, for Colombo Cricket Club in the 2004 SLC Twenty20 Tournament. He was also a part of Sri Lanka's squad for the 1998 Under-19 Cricket World Cup.
