= Tharaka Samaratunga =

Sri Lankan cricketer (born 1978)

Personal information
- Full name: Janith Tharaka Samaratunga
- Born: 14 September 1978 (age 47)
- Source: Cricinfo, 22 April 2021

Tharaka Samaratunga (born 14 September 1978) is a Sri Lankan former cricketer. He played in 17 first-class and 15 List A matches between 1998/99 and 2005/06. He made his Twenty20 debut on 17 August 2004, for Kurunegala Youth Cricket Club in the 2004 SLC Twenty20 Tournament. Following his playing career he became a coach, working with the International Cricket Council (ICC) on coaching courses in Dubai.
