= Sammika Ruwan =

Sri Lankan cricketer (born 1985)

Personal information
- Full name: Gungamuwa Yakdhehige Sammika Ruwan Perera
- Born: 14 May 1985 (age 41)
- Source: Cricinfo, 29 December 2017

Sammika Ruwan (born 14 May 1985) is a Sri Lankan cricketer. He made his Twenty20 debut on 17 August 2004, for Panadura Sports Club in the 2004 SLC Twenty20 Tournament. He made his first-class debut for Panadura Sports Club in the 2004–05 Premier Trophy on 1 October 2004.
