= Lassana Dias =

Sri Lankan cricketer (born 1979)

Personal information
- Full name: Kalupahana Liyanage Sajeewa Lassana Dias
- Born: 9 December 1979 (age 46)
- Source: Cricinfo, 24 April 2021

Lassana Dias (born 9 December 1979) is a Sri Lankan former cricketer. He played in 79 first-class and 56 List A matches between 2000/01 and 2012/13. He made his Twenty20 debut on 17 August 2004, for Tamil Union Cricket and Athletic Club in the 2004 SLC Twenty20 Tournament.
