= Dhammika Sudarshana =

Sri Lankan cricketer (born 1976)

Personal information
- Full name: Tuduwa Kankanamge Dhammika Sudarshana
- Born: 19 June 1976 (age 50); Galle, Southern Province, Sri Lanka

Career statistics
Competition	FC	LA	T20
Matches	129	62	3
Runs scored	5,280	1,348	35
Batting average	24.90	22.84	11.66
100s/50s	3/31	0/6	0/0
Top score	106	87	22
Balls bowled	972	6	–
Wickets	17	0	–
Bowling average	38.41	–	–
5 wickets in innings	0	–	–
10 wickets in match	0	–	–
Best bowling	4/30	–	–
Catches/stumpings	97/–	17/2	0/0
- Source: Cricinfo, 16 July 2021

Tuduwa Kankanamge Dhammika Sudarshana (born 19 June 1976) is a former Sri Lankan cricketer and current head coach of Sri Lanka U19 cricket team. He pursued his education at the Richmond College, Galle.

== Career ==
Dhammika started playing school cricket for Richmond College and also went onto captain his school cricket team. He played domestic cricket for Moors Sports Club, Galle Cricket Club and Panadura Sports Club. He also captained the Galle CC in domestic cricket for a brief stint. The then head coach of Sri Lanka Dav Whatmore influenced his inclusion in the Sri Lanka A team but his first national callup was hampered after sustaining a knee injury while warming up playing football. In February 2004, he was included in Sri Lanka Board XI squad captained by Russel Arnold for List A match against touring Australia. He made his Twenty20 debut on 17 August 2004, for Moors Sports Club in the 2004 SLC Twenty20 Tournament.

After his retirement, he served as the head coach of Richmond College cricket team and under his coaching Richmond cricket team had shown improvement from being in relegation to a prominent national school cricket team within ten years.

In January 2021, he was appointed as the interim head coach of the Sri Lanka Under19 cricket team replacing Hashan Tillakaratne with the focus on 2022 Under-19 Cricket World Cup.

In July 2021, he was appointed as the temporary batting coach of Sri Lankan team for the home bilateral limited overs series against India replacing Grant Flower who was tested positive for COVID-19. He was chosen by Sri Lanka Cricket for a short stint as the batting coach as he spent his time in the bio-secure bubble prior to the series against India.
