= Sanjeewa Roshan =

Sri Lankan cricketer (born 1982)

Personal information
- Full name: Sanjeewa Roshan Abeywardana
- Born: 4 October 1982 (age 43)
- Source: Cricinfo, 22 April 2021

Sanjeewa Roshan (born 4 October 1982) is a Sri Lankan former cricketer. He played in 56 first-class and 35 List A matches between 2000/01 and 2010/11. He made his Twenty20 debut on 17 August 2004, for Panadura Sports Club in the 2004 SLC Twenty20 Tournament.
