= Mevan Fernando =

Sri Lankan cricketer (born 1981)

Personal information
- Born: 16 March 1981 (age 45); Negombo, Sri Lanka
- Source: ESPNcricinfo, 13 December 2016

Mevan Fernando (born 16 March 1981) is a Sri Lankan cricketer. He played 56 first-class and 46 List A matches between 2002 and 2011. He made his Twenty20 debut on 17 August 2004, for Tamil Union Cricket and Athletic Club in the 2004 SLC Twenty20 Tournament. He was also part of Sri Lanka's squad for the 2000 Under-19 Cricket World Cup.
