= Priyankara Silva =

Sri Lankan cricketer (born 1975)

Personal information
- Full name: Rupage Chasun Randeer Priyankara Silva
- Born: 27 July 1975 (age 51)
- Source: Cricinfo, 21 April 2021

Priyankara Silva (born 27 July 1975) is a Sri Lankan former cricketer. He played in 78 first-class and 36 List A matches between 1996/97 and 2009/10. He made his Twenty20 debut on 17 August 2004, for Burgher Recreation Club in the 2004 SLC Twenty20 Tournament.
