= Ashan Ranaweera =

Sri Lankan cricketer (born 1973)

Personal information
- Full name: Balage Don Ashan Priyanka Ranaweera
- Born: 1 December 1973 (age 52); Horana, Sri Lanka
- Source: Cricinfo, 23 April 2021

Ashan Ranaweera (born 1 December 1973) is a Sri Lankan former cricketer. He played in 58 first-class and 29 List A matches between 1996/97 and 2009/10. He made his Twenty20 debut on 17 August 2004, for Moors Sports Club in the 2004 SLC Twenty20 Tournament.
