= Nuwan Shiroman =

Sri Lankan cricketer (born 1974)

Personal information
- Full name: Polwatta Samaraweera Arachchige Nuwan Shiroman
- Born: 14 September 1974 (age 51)
- Source: Cricinfo, 23 April 2021

Nuwan Shiroman (born 14 September 1974) is a Sri Lankan former cricketer. He played in 127 first-class and 75 List A matches between 1995/96 and 2010/11. He made his Twenty20 debut on 17 August 2004, for Sebastianites Cricket and Athletic Club in the 2004 SLC Twenty20 Tournament. Following his playing career, he became a cricket coach.
