= Dilan Ramanayake =

Sri Lankan cricketer (born 1980)

Personal information
- Full name: Dilan Milindu Ramanayake
- Born: 15 June 1980 (age 46)
- Source: Cricinfo, 22 April 2021

Dilan Ramanayake (born 15 June 1980) is a Sri Lankan former cricketer. He played in 37 first-class and 37 List A matches between 1999/00 and 2008/09. He made his Twenty20 debut on 17 August 2004, for Kurunegala Youth Cricket Club in the 2004 SLC Twenty20 Tournament.
