= Manohara Kudagodage =

Sri Lankan cricketer (born 1972)

Personal information
- Full name: Manohara Yasas Kudagodage
- Born: 30 October 1972 (age 53)
- Batting: Right-handed
- Role: Wicket-keeper
- Source: Cricinfo, 20 April 2021

Manohara Kudagodage (born 30 October 1972) is a Sri Lankan former cricketer.

== Career ==
He played in 32 first-class and 7 List A matches between 1995/96 and 2004/05. He made his Twenty20 debut on 17 August 2004, for Sri Lanka Police Sports Club in the 2004 SLC Twenty20 Tournament.
