= Sandun Dias =

Sri Lankan cricketer (born 1985)

Personal information
- Born: 29 July 1985 (age 41)
- Source: Cricinfo, 27 February 2018

Sandun Dias (born 29 July 1985) is a Sri Lankan cricketer. He made his first-class debut for Nondescripts Cricket Club in the 2003–04 Premier Trophy on 14 November 2003. He made his Twenty20 debut on 17 August 2004, for Tamil Union Cricket and Athletic Club in the 2004 SLC Twenty20 Tournament.
