= Rashantha Sureshchandra =

Sri Lankan cricketer (born 1978)

Personal information
- Full name: Rashantha Harindra Sureshchandra
- Born: 3 April 1978 (age 48); Colombo, Sri Lanka
- Source: Cricinfo, 22 April 2021

Rashantha Sureshchandra (born 3 April 1978) is a Sri Lankan former cricketer. He played in 40 first-class and 18 List A matches between 1998/99 and 2005/06. He made his Twenty20 debut on 17 August 2004, for Kurunegala Youth Cricket Club in the 2004 SLC Twenty20 Tournament.
