= Dhushantha Ranatunga =

Sri Lankan cricketer (born 1991)

Personal information
- Born: 8 November 1991 (age 35); Negombo, Sri Lanka
- Source: Cricinfo, 30 January 2016

Dhushantha Ranatunga (born 8 November 1991) is a Sri Lankan former first-class cricketer who played for Ragama Cricket Club. He made his Twenty20 debut on 17 August 2004, for Ragama Cricket Club in the 2004 SLC Twenty20 Tournament.
