= Pubudu Seneviratne =

Sri Lankan cricketer (born 1980)

Personal information
- Full name: Kankanmala Pubudu Prasad Bandara Seneviratne
- Born: 9 January 1980 (age 46); Kegalle, Sri Lanka
- Height: 5 ft 11 in (180 cm)
- Batting: Right-handed
- Bowling: Right-arm Offbreak
- Role: Batsman
- Source: Cricinfo, 23 April 2021

Pubudu Seneviratne (born 9 January 1980) is a Sri Lankan former cricketer. He played in 53 first-class and 47 List A matches between 1999/00 and 2009/10. He made his Twenty20 debut on 17 August 2004, for Sebastianites Cricket and Athletic Club in the 2004 SLC Twenty20 Tournament. He was a past pupil of Dharmaraja College.
