= Vajira Ranaweera =

Sri Lankan cricketer (1968–2020)

Personal information
- Full name: Tanaweera Achchige Vajira Hemantha Kumara Ranaweera
- Born: 18 December 1968
- Died: 28 April 2020 (aged 51)
- Source: Cricinfo, 4 May 2020

Tanaweera Achchige Vajira Hemantha Kumara Ranaweera (18 December 1968 – 28 April 2020) was a Sri Lankan cricketer. He played in 96 first-class matches for the Sri Lanka Police Sports Club between 1995 and 2007, taking more than 250 wickets, and he also spent time as the team's captain. He made his Twenty20 debut on 17 August 2004, for Sri Lanka Police Sports Club in the 2004 SLC Twenty20 Tournament. In the Sri Lankan police force, he reached the rank of chief inspector.
