= Nayantha Weeraman =

Sri Lankan cricketer (born 1977)

Personal information
- Full name: Nayantha Neeranjana Weeraman
- Born: 12 November 1977 (age 48)
- Source: Cricinfo, 24 April 2021

Nayantha Weeraman (born 12 November 1977) is a Sri Lankan former cricketer. He played in 45 first-class and 21 List A matches between 1998/99 and 2006/07. He made his Twenty20 debut on 17 August 2004, for Tamil Union Cricket and Athletic Club in the 2004 SLC Twenty20 Tournament.
