= Ruchira Karunasena =

Sri Lankan cricketer (born 1977)

Personal information
- Full name: Porawakara Arachchige Ruchira Chanaka Karunasena
- Born: 14 October 1977 (age 48)
- Source: Cricinfo, 21 April 2021

Ruchira Karunasena (born 14 October 1977) is a Sri Lankan former cricketer. He played in 44 first-class and 40 List A matches between 1998/99 and 2007/08. He made his Twenty20 debut on 17 August 2004, for Galle Cricket Club in the 2004 SLC Twenty20 Tournament.
