= Rally Tissera =

Sri Lankan cricketer (born 1978)

Personal information
- Full name: Rally Roshan Tissera
- Born: 14 December 1978 (age 47)
- Source: Cricinfo, 24 April 2021

Rally Tissera (born 14 December 1978) is a Sri Lankan former cricketer. He played in 60 first-class and 39 List A matches between 1999/00 and 2006/07. He made his Twenty20 debut on 17 August 2004, for Tamil Union Cricket and Athletic Club in the 2004 SLC Twenty20 Tournament.
