= Saman Wijeratne =

Sri Lankan cricketer (born 1978)

Personal information
- Full name: Saman Asiri Wijeratne
- Born: 31 January 1978 (age 48)
- Source: Cricinfo, 20 April 2021

Saman Wijeratne (born 31 January 1978) is a Sri Lankan former cricketer. He played in 75 first-class and 40 List A matches between 1997/98 and 2011/12. He made his Twenty20 debut on 17 August 2004, for Sri Lanka Police Sports Club in the 2004 SLC Twenty20 Tournament.
