= Chathura Athukorala =

Sri Lankan cricketer (born 1984)

Personal information
- Full name: Athukorala Arachchige Chathura Eranga
- Born: 6 July 1984 (age 42); Akmeemana, Sri Lanka
- Source: Cricinfo, 21 April 2021

Chathura Athukorala (born 6 July 1984) is a Sri Lankan former cricketer. He played in 34 first-class and 25 List A matches between 2004/05 and 2010/11. He made his Twenty20 debut on 17 August 2004, for Galle Cricket Club in the 2004 SLC Twenty20 Tournament. Following his career in Sri Lanka, he also played cricket in Australia.
