= Subodha Jayawardene =

Sri Lankan cricketer (born 1980)

Personal information
- Full name: Herath Mudiyanselage Subodha Jayawardene
- Born: 21 August 1980 (age 46); Kurunegala, Sri Lanka
- Source: Cricinfo, 23 April 2021

Subodha Jayawardene (born 21 August 1980) is a Sri Lankan former cricketer. He played in 41 first-class and 25 List A matches between 1999/00 and 2006/07. He made his Twenty20 debut on 17 August 2004, for Moors Sports Club in the 2004 SLC Twenty20 Tournament.
