= Sumalka Perera =

Sri Lankan cricketer (born 1982)

Personal information
- Full name: Suse Perera Liyanage Chrishanth Sumalka Perera
- Born: 12 November 1982 (age 44); Colombo, Sri Lanka
- Source: ESPNcricinfo, 15 December 2016

Sumalka Perera (born 12 November 1982) is a Sri Lankan cricketer. He played 24 first-class and 18 List A matches between 2001 and 2007. He made his Twenty20 debut on 17 August 2004, for Sebastianites Cricket and Athletic Club in the 2004 SLC Twenty20 Tournament. He was also part of Sri Lanka's squad for the 2002 Under-19 Cricket World Cup.
