= Sunendra Kumara =

Sri Lankan cricketer (born 1973)

Personal information
- Full name: Jayalajjage Sunendra Kumara Peiris
- Born: 8 April 1973 (age 53)
- Source: Cricinfo, 23 April 2021

Sunendra Kumara (born 8 April 1973) is a Sri Lankan former cricketer. He played in 153 first-class and 74 List A matches between 1991/92 and 2011/12. He made his Twenty20 debut on 17 August 2004, for Ragama Cricket Club in the 2004 SLC Twenty20 Tournament.
