= Praneth Jayasundera =

Sri Lankan cricketer (born 1980)

Personal information
- Full name: Jayasundera Mudiyanselage Praneth Chamara
- Born: 6 August 1980 (age 46)
- Source: Cricinfo, 20 November 2017

Praneth Jayasundera (born 6 August 1980) is a Sri Lankan cricketer. He played 72 first-class and 51 List A matches for multiple domestic sides in Sri Lanka between 2001 and 2009. He made his Twenty20 debut on 17 August 2004, for Chilaw Marians Cricket Club in the 2004 SLC Twenty20 Tournament. His last first-class match was for Lankan Cricket Club in the 2009–10 Premier Trophy on 4 December 2009.

== See also ==
- List of Chilaw Marians Cricket Club players
