= Duminda Wickramasinghe =

Sri Lankan cricketer (born 1968)

Personal information
- Full name: Duminda Dharmin Wickramasinghe
- Born: 1 October 1968 (age 57)
- Batting: Right-handed
- Bowling: Legbreak
- Source: Cricinfo, 21 April 2021

Duminda Wickramasinghe (born 1 October 1968) is a Sri Lankan former cricketer. He played in 131 first-class and 32 List A matches between 1990/91 and 2006/07. He made his Twenty20 debut on 17 August 2004, for Galle Cricket Club in the 2004 SLC Twenty20 Tournament.
