= Sanjeewa Silva =

Sri Lankan cricketer (born 1975)

Rodrigo Hennedige Sanjeewa Silva (born 9 April 1975) in Dehiwala is a Sri Lankan first-class cricketer. A right-handed batsman, he debuted in 1993/94 and has made more than 6000 first-class runs, making him one of the most experienced batsmen in the country. He made his Twenty20 debut on 17 August 2004, for Burgher Recreation Club in the 2004 SLC Twenty20 Tournament.
