= Roshan Weerasinghe =

Sri Lankan cricketer (born 1976)

Personal information
- Full name: Roshan Nawaz Weerasinghe
- Born: 20 August 1976 (age 50)
- Source: Cricinfo, 21 April 2021

Roshan Weerasinghe (born 20 August 1976) is a Sri Lankan former cricketer. He played in 23 first-class and 10 List A matches between 1998/99 and 2010/11. He made his Twenty20 debut on 17 August 2004, for Burgher Recreation Club in the 2004 SLC Twenty20 Tournament.
