= Amila Mendis =

Sri Lankan cricketer (born 1982)

Personal information
- Full name: Yagamuni Amila Nuwan Mendis
- Born: 9 June 1982 (age 44)
- Source: Cricinfo, 20 April 2021

Amila Mendis (born 9 June 1982) is a Sri Lankan former cricketer. He played in 61 first-class and 48 List A matches between 1998/99 and 2013/14. He made his Twenty20 debut on 17 August 2004, for Sri Lanka Police Sports Club in the 2004 SLC Twenty20 Tournament.
