= Ajith Ekanayake =

Sri Lankan cricketer (born 1965)

Personal information
- Full name: Ajith Wijeratne Ekanayake
- Born: 3 October 1965 (age 61)
- Batting: Right-handed
- Bowling: Slow left-arm Orthodox
- Source: Cricinfo, 19 April 2021

Ajith Ekanayake (born 3 October 1965) is a Sri Lankan former cricketer. He played in 160 first-class and 48 List A matches between 1990/91 and 2011/12, taking more than 670 first-class wickets. He made his Twenty20 debut on 17 August 2004, for Kurunegala Youth Cricket Club in the 2004 SLC Twenty20 Tournament. In November 2005, during the 2005–06 Premier Limited Overs Tournament, Ekanayake conceded 34 runs in one over, as Kaushalya Weeraratne set a new record for the fastest fifty in a one-day match. After his playing career, he became a spin bowling coach.
