= Pramuka Sudesh =

Sri Lankan cricketer (born 1982)

Personal information
- Full name: Pramuka Sudesh Liyanage
- Born: 4 May 1982 (age 44)
- Source: Cricinfo, 22 April 2021

Pramuka Sudesh (born 4 May 1982) is a Sri Lankan former cricketer. He played in 65 first-class and 42 List A matches between 2002/03 and 2010/11. He made his Twenty20 debut on 17 August 2004, for Colts Cricket Club in the 2004 SLC Twenty20 Tournament.
