= Pradeep Kumara =

Sri Lankan cricketer (born 1972)

Pradeep Kumara (born Jayasinghage Pradeep Kumara on 15 August 1972) was a Sri Lankan cricketer. He was a right-handed batsman and left-arm slow bowler who played for Police Sports Club. He was born in Colombo.

Kumara made a single first-class appearance for the side, during the 1998–99 season, against Burgher Recreation Club. In the only innings in which he batted, he scored 7 runs.

He made a single List A appearance, though he did not bat or bowl in the match, against Bloomfield Cricket and Athletic Club.
