= Udara Warna =

Sri Lankan cricketer (born 1984)

Personal information
- Full name: Hewa Wellalage Udara Warna
- Born: 11 March 1984 (age 42)
- Source: Cricinfo, 20 April 2021

Udara Warna (born 11 March 1984) is a Sri Lankan former cricketer. He played in 32 first-class and 34 List A matches between 2001/02 and 2010/11. He made his Twenty20 debut on 17 August 2004, for Bloomfield Cricket and Athletic Club in the 2004 SLC Twenty20 Tournament.
