= Indika de Saram =

Sri Lankan cricketer (born 1973)

Personal information
- Full name: Samantha Indika de Saram
- Born: 2 September 1973 (age 53); Matara, Sri Lanka
- Batting: Right-handed
- Bowling: Right-arm offbreak
- Role: Wicket-keeper

International information
- National side: Sri Lanka (1999–2009)
- Test debut (cap 80): 18 November 1999 v Zimbabwe
- Last Test: 12 March 2000 v Pakistan
- ODI debut (cap 100): 22 August 1999 v Australia
- Last ODI: 20 April 2001 v Pakistan
- Only T20I (cap 27): 10 February 2009 v India

Career statistics
Competition	Test	ODI	FC	LA
Matches	4	15	217	183
Runs scored	117	183	12,679	4,553
Batting average	23.40	16.63	39.13	28.63
100s/50s	0/0	0/0	28/68	4/30
Top score	39	38	237	138
Balls bowled	–	–	1,912	652
Wickets	–	–	27	11
Bowling average	–	–	43.33	43.90
5 wickets in innings	–	–	0	0
10 wickets in match	–	–	0	0
Best bowling	–	–	3/27	2/5
Catches/stumpings	1/–	9/–	236/8	71/2
- Source: Cricinfo, 10 June 2015

Samantha Indika de Saram (born 2 September 1973) is a former Sri Lankan cricketer. He is a right-handed batsman and a right-arm off-break bowler who usually plays as a wicketkeeper. He is a former student of St. Thomas' College, Matara.

== Domestic career ==
A powerful batsman, Saram kept wickets and scored a vast number of runs for his school team, becoming one of the most reliable batsmen in the country, including an innings in which he alone scored 304 runs in just 149 balls. However, playing for his Test side, he was never really given a chance to shine, and he has not played a Test match for nearly six years, opting instead for the realms of Twenty20 cricket. He made his Twenty20 debut on 17 August 2004, for Galle Cricket Club in the 2004 SLC Twenty20 Tournament.

He has also played for Sultans of Sylhet in Bangladesh's NCL T20 Bangladesh.

He was a continuous member in Sri Lanka squad for Hong Kong Cricket Sixes competition, where Sri Lanka won the tournament under his captaincy in 2007.

== International career ==
He was a in and out member for the Sri Lanka team due to many permanent batsman retained in the squad. He is the 100th ODI cap for Sri Lanka as well.

After dropped from international squad in 2001, de Seram was brought in to the Twenty20 International team in 2009 for the 2009 ICC World Twenty20, and played debut against India. This was the only match played by him until his retirement.
