= Saman Jayantha =

Sri Lankan cricketer (born 1974)

Personal information
- Full name: Warushavithana Saman Jayantha
- Born: 26 January 1974 (age 52); Ambalangoda, Sri Lanka
- Batting: Right-handed
- Bowling: Right-arm off break

International information
- National side: Sri Lanka
- ODI debut (cap 119): 27 February 2004 v Australia
- Last ODI: 26 December 2004 v New Zealand

Career statistics
Competition	ODI
Matches	17
Runs scored	400
Batting average	26.66
100s/50s	0/2
Top score	74*
Balls bowled	55
Wickets	0
Bowling average	–
5 wickets in innings	–
10 wickets in match	–
Best bowling	–
Catches/stumpings	5/0
- Source: Cricinfo, 4 February 2017

Warushavithana Saman Jayantha (born 26 January 1974), known as Saman Jayantha, is a former Sri Lankan cricketer who played 17 One Day Internationals for Sri Lanka in 2004 before he was dropped by the Sri Lankan selectors.

== International career ==
He started his international career by scoring 24 runs in two matches against Australia as a middle order batsman, but improved during Sri Lanka's 5–0 whitewash of Zimbabwe in April 2004, hitting a career-best 74 not out to guide Sri Lanka to a nine-wicket win in the second ODI. However, he only played three of Sri Lanka's six matches during the 2004 Asia Cup, and was in and out of the team until successive ducks against Pakistan and New Zealand caused his exit from the team.

== Domestic career ==
He made his Twenty20 debut on 17 August 2004, for Bloomfield Cricket and Athletic Club in the 2004 SLC Twenty20 Tournament.

Jayantha was also part of the Sri Lankan team that lifted the Hong Kong Cricket Sixes title in 2007 where he was also the leading wicket taker in that tournament with 6 wickets. In the 2003 Hong Kong Sixes he was the leading runscorer scoring 152 runs and went on to win the man of the tournament award. He is also the only Sri Lankan to have won the "Man of the tournament" award in Hong Kong Sixes history.
