= Rasmi Jinan =

Sri Lankan cricketer (born 1981)

Personal information
- Full name: Mohamed Marshuk Rasmijinan
- Born: 6 April 1981 (age 45)
- Source: Cricinfo, 20 April 2021

Rasmi Jinan (born 6 April 1981) is a Sri Lankan former cricketer. He played in 50 first-class and 42 List A matches between 2000/01 and 2012/13. He made his Twenty20 debut on 17 August 2004, for Sri Lanka Police Sports Club in the 2004 SLC Twenty20 Tournament.
