= Duminda Perera =

Sri Lankan cricketer (born 1979)

Weerasekera Diyalatotage Duminda Sanjeewa Perera (born October 29, 1979) in Colombo is a Sri Lankan first-class cricketer. A right-handed batsman and former Sri Lanka under-19 representative, Perera made his first class debut in 1998/99. He has gone on to play for Sri Lanka A. He made his Twenty20 debut on 17 August 2004, for Ragama Cricket Club in the 2004 SLC Twenty20 Tournament.
