= Ruwan Dilruk =

Sri Lankan cricketer (born 1978)

Personal information
- Full name: Dissanayake Mudiyanselage Ruwan Dilruk Dissanayake
- Born: 25 December 1978 (age 47)
- Source: Cricinfo, 23 April 2021

Ruwan Dilruk (born 25 December 1978) is a Sri Lankan former cricketer. He played in 70 first-class and 48 List A matches between 2001/02 and 2009/10. He made his Twenty20 debut on 17 August 2004, for Ragama Cricket Club in the 2004 SLC Twenty20 Tournament.
