= Dinesh Manjula de Silva =

Sri Lankan cricketer (born 1984)

Personal information
- Full name: Jayamuni Dinesh Manjula de Silva
- Born: 6 September 1984 (age 42)
- Source: Cricinfo, 22 April 2021

Dinesh Manjula de Silva (born 6 September 1984) is a Sri Lankan former cricketer. He played in 49 first-class and 38 List A matches between 2004/05 and 2012/13. He made his Twenty20 debut on 17 August 2004, for Sri Lanka Air Force Sports Club in the 2004 SLC Twenty20 Tournament.
