= Ishan Mutaliph =

Sri Lankan cricketer (born 1983)

Personal information
- Full name: Tuan Mohamed Ishan Mutaliph
- Born: 8 February 1983 (age 43)
- Source: Cricinfo, 4 December 2017

Ishan Mutaliph (born 8 February 1983) is a Sri Lankan cricketer. He played 78 first-class and 60 List A matches for multiple domestic sides in Sri Lanka between 2001 and 2014. He made his Twenty20 debut on 17 August 2004, for Chilaw Marians Cricket Club in the 2004 SLC Twenty20 Tournament. His last first-class match was for Colts Cricket Club in the 2013–14 Premier Trophy on 7 February 2014.

== See also ==
- List of Chilaw Marians Cricket Club players
