= Wasantha Kumara =

Sri Lankan cricketer (born 1964)

Personal information
- Full name: Jathun Archchilage Manal Wasantha Kumara
- Born: 13 July 1964 (age 62)
- Batting: Right-handed
- Bowling: Right-arm fast medium
- Source: Cricinfo, 22 April 2021

Wasantha Kumara (born 13 July 1964) is a Sri Lankan former cricketer. He played in 95 first-class and 13 List A matches between 1990/91 and 2001/02. He made his Twenty20 debut on 17 August 2004, for Kurunegala Youth Cricket Club in the 2004 SLC Twenty20 Tournament.
