= Muditha Maduwantha =

Sri Lankan cricketer (born 1979)

Personal information
- Full name: Hewasahiduge Muditha Maduwantha
- Born: 2 December 1979 (age 46)
- Source: Cricinfo, 22 April 2021

Muditha Maduwantha (born 2 December 1979) is a Sri Lankan former cricketer. He played in 76 first-class and 52 List A matches between 2000/01 and 2007/08. He made his Twenty20 debut on 17 August 2004, for Kurunegala Youth Cricket Club in the 2004 SLC Twenty20 Tournament. Following his playing career, he became a coach in Adelaide, Australia.
