= Wesley Fernando =

Sri Lankan cricketer (born 1977)

Personal information
- Full name: Wesley Rasika Fernando
- Born: 1 December 1977 (age 48)
- Source: Cricinfo, 23 April 2021

Wesley Fernando (born 3 December 1977) is a Sri Lankan former cricketer. He played in 71 first-class and 45 List A matches between 1998/99 and 2009/10. He made his Twenty20 debut on 17 August 2004, for Moors Sports Club in the 2004 SLC Twenty20 Tournament. As well as playing domestic cricket in Sri Lanka, he also played for several league clubs in the north of England.
