= Heshan Tillakaratne =

Sri Lankan cricketer (born 1976)

Personal information
- Full name: Hetti Arachchilage Heshan Udara Tillakaratne
- Born: 16 December 1976 (age 49)
- Source: Cricinfo, 23 April 2021

Heshan Tillakaratne (born 16 December 1976) is a Sri Lankan former cricketer. He played in 75 first-class and 62 List A matches between 1998/99 and 2010/11. He made his Twenty20 debut on 17 August 2004, for Moors Sports Club in the 2004 SLC Twenty20 Tournament.
