= Malintha Gajanayake =

Sri Lankan cricketer (born 1980)

Malintha Krishantha Gajanayake (born October 5, 1980, in Colombo) is a Sri Lankan first class cricketer. He is a right-handed middle order batsman.

A promising under age player, he captained both the Sri Lankan Under-15 and Under-19 teams. The latter he led in the 2000 Under-19's World Cup at home in Sri Lanka. He made his Twenty20 debut on 17 August 2004, for Chilaw Marians Cricket Club in the 2004 SLC Twenty20 Tournament.

== See also ==
- List of Chilaw Marians Cricket Club players
