= Thamara Abeyratne =

Sri Lankan cricketer (born 1978)

Personal information
- Full name: Meegamuwage Thamara Abeyratne
- Born: 21 September 1978 (age 47); Panadura, Sri Lanka
- Source: Cricinfo, 23 April 2021

Thamara Abeyratne (born 21 September 1978) is a Sri Lankan former cricketer. He played in 87 first-class and 65 List A matches between 2000/01 and 2011/12. He made his Twenty20 debut on 17 August 2004, for Moors Sports Club in the 2004 SLC Twenty20 Tournament. Following his playing career, he became the head coach at Thurstan College.
