= Chanaka Withanage =

Sri Lankan cricketer (born 1976)

Personal information
- Full name: Chanaka Mawalle Withanage
- Born: 26 June 1976 (age 50)
- Source: Cricinfo, 23 April 2021

Chanaka Withanage (born 26 June 1976) is a Sri Lankan former cricketer. He played in 117 first-class and 44 List A matches between 1996/97 and 2016/17. He made his Twenty20 debut on 17 August 2004, for Ragama Cricket Club in the 2004 SLC Twenty20 Tournament.
