= Gihan Fernando (cricketer) =

Sri Lankan cricketer (born 1980)

Personal information
- Full name: Hettiyadura Gihan Shammika Prasanga Fernando
- Born: 12 September 1980 (age 45)
- Source: Cricinfo, 23 April 2021

Gihan Fernando (born 12 September 1980) is a Sri Lankan former cricketer. He played in 22 first-class and 11 List A matches between 2000/01 and 2004/05. He made his Twenty20 debut on 17 August 2004, for Ragama Cricket Club in the 2004 SLC Twenty20 Tournament. Following his playing career, he became a cricket coach in New Zealand.
