= Ganganath Ratnayake =

Sri Lankan cricketer (born 1984)

Personal information
- Full name: Ratnayake Wasala Mudiyanselage Ganganath Asanga Ratnayake
- Born: 15 September 1984 (age 41)
- Source: Cricinfo, 22 April 2021

Ganganath Ratnayake (born 15 September 1984) is a Sri Lankan former cricketer. He played in twenty first-class and ten List A matches between 2001/02 and 2006/07. He also played for the Sri Lanka Cricket President's XI team during England's tour of Sri Lanka in November and December 2003. He made his Twenty20 debut on 17 August 2004, for Colombo Cricket Club in the 2004 SLC Twenty20 Tournament.
