= Sudheera de Zoysa =

Sri Lankan cricketer (born 1984)

Personal information
- Full name: Runmuni Sudheera Randheera de Zoysa
- Born: 8 October 1984 (age 41); Colombo, Sri Lanka
- Source: Cricinfo, 24 April 2021

Sudheera de Zoysa (born 8 October 1984) is a Sri Lankan former cricketer. He played in 29 first-class and 38 List A matches between 2001/02 and 2009/10. He made his Twenty20 debut on 17 August 2004, for Nondescripts Cricket Club in the 2004 SLC Twenty20 Tournament. He is one of only a handful of bowlers who have taken four wickets without conceding a run in a first-class match.
