= Ranga Dias (cricketer) =

Sri Lankan cricketer (born 1979)

Wadugamudalige Joseph Maurice Ranga Dias (born 14 August 1979, Kandy) is a Sri Lankan cricketer. He plays first class cricket for the Tamil Union Cricket and Athletic Club and also represents Sri Lanka A. Debuting in 1999/00, Dias is a right-arm fast-medium bowler. He made his Twenty20 debut on 17 August 2004, for Tamil Union Cricket and Athletic Club in the 2004 SLC Twenty20 Tournament.
