= Kaushalya Weeraratne =

Sri Lankan cricekter

Personal information
- Born: 29 January 1981 (age 45); Gampola, Sri Lanka
- Batting: Left-handed
- Bowling: Right–arm medium–fast
- Role: All-rounder

International information
- National side: Sri Lanka (2000–2009)
- ODI debut (cap 104): 29 May 2000 v Bangladesh
- Last ODI: 3 July 2008 v India
- T20I debut (cap 26): 11 October 2008 v Pakistan
- Last T20I: 12 December 2009 v India

Domestic team information
- Years: Team
- Bloomfield
- Colts Cricket Club
- Gazi Tank
- Nondescripts CC
- Ragama CC
- Ruhuna Reds
- 2012: Wayamba United
- Narre South Cricket Club

Career statistics
Competition	ODI	T20I	FC	LA
Matches	15	5	114	135
Runs scored	160	49	4,125	1,927
Batting average	20.00	16.33	26.78	25.02
100s/50s	0/0	0/0	2/22	1/10
Top score	41	20*	135	143
Balls bowled	480	90	11,238	4,667
Wickets	6	4	277	141
Bowling average	64.16	31.50	25.72	24.98
5 wickets in innings	0	0	5	2
10 wickets in match	0	0	0	0
Best bowling	3/46	4/19	6/47	5/19
Catches/stumpings	3/–	4/–	71/–	45/–
- Source: Cricinfo, 12 July 2021

Kaushalya Weeraratne also known as Kaushal Weeraratne (born 29 January 1981) is a Sri Lankan former international cricketer. After starting his international career as a bowler, he later moved up the batting order to become an all-rounder, batting in the middle order and bowling medium-fast. He is regarded as one of the players to have been included in the lost generation of Sri Lanka cricket according to Lasith Malinga, an elite list which include players who have performed consistently in domestic circuit for over ten years but had to toil hard to play in international cricket due to the presence of frontline players. Weeraratne once took 4 wickets in 5 balls in an Eastern Cricket Association Veterans game, which he described as his greatest ever bowling performance, given the quality of the opposition.

== Early life ==
Weeraratne had his secondary education at Trinity College, Kandy, which is also the alma mater of Sri Lankan batting great Kumar Sangakkara. He played school cricket at Trinity College and also captained the Trinity College cricket team for two consecutive years and was the first Trinitian to win Sunday Observer Schoolboy Cricketer of the Year. His cousin Dinuk Weeraratne and his two brothers, Pasan Weeraratne and Dasun Weeraratne have also played first class cricket.

== Domestic career ==
Weeraratne made his domestic first class debut for Nondescripts against Singha in the opening game of Group A of the 1999/00 Premier League Trophy, scoring 43 in his only innings in the match. Later in the season, he performed well for Sri Lanka A in their matches against the touring Zimbabwe A side, with innings figures of 4/67 in a warm-up game, 4/108 in the first A team test, and 3/66 in the second A team test.

Weeraratne did not play domestic first class cricket in the 2000/01 season. He did play 5 matches in the List A Premier Limited Over tournament, for Colts CC, scoring 45 runs at an average of 15. He made his T20 debut playing for Ragama against Bloomfield Cricket and Athletic Club on 8 October 2005.

He holds the record for the fastest ever List A 50, beating Adam Hollioake's record by 3 runs in a 12 ball effort. He achieved the milestone in November 2005 while playing for Ragama Cricket Club against Kurunegala Youth Cricket Club. His innings included an over that went for 34 runs with 5 successive sixes off the bowling of Ajith Ekanayake.

He also played for Sultans of Sylhet in Bangladesh's NCL T20 Bangladesh. In 2008, he was invited by Kolkata Knight Riders for a training session. He was bought by Wayamba United in the SLPL draft for the inaugural edition of the Sri Lanka Premier League in 2012. He also currently plays and coaches the Narre South Cricket Club at the Dandenong District Cricket Association League in Australia.

== International career ==
Weeraratne came up through the ranks of Sri Lankan cricket, being voted Sri Lankan Schoolboy Cricketer of the Year for the 1999/2000 season, being part of the Sri Lanka side which played at the 2000 Under-19 Cricket World Cup where Sri Lanka emerged as runners-up to India in the final. He was the second leading wicket taker for Sri Lanka behind Ranil Dhammika's 13 scalps during the 2000 U19 World Cup capturing 12 wickets at a bowling average of 13. He also captained Sri Lanka under-19s on their 2000 tour of England.

He made his international debut aged only 19, against Bangladesh in the 2000 Asia Cup. He went onto feature in all four of Sri Lanka's matches in that ODI tournament, and taking 4 wickets for the cost of 98 runs. The next season he was named in the Sri Lankan squad for the 2000 Coca-Cola Champions Trophy in Sharjah, playing in four of the five matches in Sri Lanka's successful campaign where they became victorious defeating India in the final by a massive margin of 245 runs. He took just 1 wicket in the tournament, but maintained a reasonable economy rate of 4.53 in the 30 overs which he bowled. He was subsequently part of the Sri Lankan squad which toured South Africa in December 2000 and January 2001, playing in two of the six ODIs, but made a limited impact, finishing with just 13 runs and combined bowling figures of 1/54 in his eight overs. He was subsequently left out of the squad for the immediately following ODI series in New Zealand.

After over two years out of the side, he returned to international cricket in the Bank Alfalah Cup in May 2003, as part of the Sri Lankan side who were heavily beaten by Pakistan. He did not play again in the tournament; and after that was out of the Sri Lankan ODI side for nearly five years, until the 2008 Sri Lankan tour of the West Indies. By this time his role in the side had changed, moving up to bat in the middle order, and he played an important role in the third ODI, scoring 41 in 33 balls, and forming a partnership of 79 in 56 balls with Tillakaratne Dilshan. He was included in Sri Lankan squad for the 2008 Asia Cup where Sri Lanka defeated India in the final to secure the fourth Asia Cup title. He was also part of the Sri Lankan team which emerged as winners of the 2007 Hong Kong Sixes tournament defeating All Stars in the final and he also played key role scoring 32 runs off just nine balls before being retired not out.

He made his T20I debut on 11 October 2008 against Pakistan at the 2008 Quadrangular Twenty20 Series which was held in Canada and made his mark with an all round performance on debut with a fine bowling figures of 4 /19 and went onto score unbeaten 20 off 13 balls. However, his efforts were in vain as Pakistan won by three wickets. Kaushalya also became the second Sri Lankan to grab four wickets on T20I debut after Ajantha Mendis and also holds the second best bowling figures by a Sri Lankan bowler on T20I debut. Incidentally, Ajantha Mendis made his T20I debut on 10 October 2008, just a day prior to Kaushalya's T20I debut. He also represented Sri Lanka at the 2010 Asian Games as part of the cricket team where Sri Lanka was placed fourth position in the men's team competition.

He retired from all forms of cricket in 2014. He was also part of Sri Lankan team which emerged as runners-up to India in the final of the 2020–21 Road Safety World Series.
