= Upul Fernando =

Sri Lankan cricketer (born 1973)

Personal information
- Full name: Edirippulige Felician Mahinda Upul Fernando
- Born: 8 June 1973 (age 53)
- Source: Cricinfo, 7 November 2017

Upul Fernando (born 8 June 1973) is a Sri Lankan cricketer. He played 153 first-class and 67 List A matches for multiple domestic sides in Sri Lanka between 1991 and 2015. He made his Twenty20 debut on 17 August 2004, for Ragama Cricket Club in the 2004 SLC Twenty20 Tournament. His last first-class match was for Chilaw Marians Cricket Club in the 2014–15 Premier Trophy on 20 March 2015.

== See also ==
- List of Chilaw Marians Cricket Club players
