= Viraj Perera =

Sri Lankan cricketer (born 1978)

Modara Mehellage Don Pasanna Viraj Perera (born June 9, 1978, in Galle) is a Sri Lankan first class cricketer. An all-rounder, he has made 2 first class hundreds and has taken over 100 wickets with his right-arm offbreak bowling.
