= Sagara Dananjaya =

Sri Lankan cricketer (born 1981)

Personal information
- Full name: Ganvari Sagara Dananjaya
- Born: 6 September 1981 (age 45)
- Source: Cricinfo, 22 April 2021

Sagara Dananjaya (born 6 September 1981) is a Sri Lankan former cricketer. He played in 80 first-class and 57 List A matches between 1998/99 and 2004/05. He made his Twenty20 debut on 17 August 2004, for Sri Lanka Air Force Sports Club in the 2004 SLC Twenty20 Tournament.
