= Ranil Dhammika =

Sri Lankan cricketer (born 1980)

Personal information
- Born: 27 December 1980 (age 45); Colombo, Sri Lanka
- Source: ESPNcricinfo, 13 December 2016

Ranil Dhammika (born 27 December 1980) is a Sri Lankan and High Wycombe cricketer. He played 84 first-class and 86 List A matches between 1999 and 2016. He was also part of Sri Lanka's squad for the 2000 Under-19 Cricket World Cup. He made his Twenty20 debut on 17 August 2004, for Chilaw Marians Cricket Club in the 2004 SLC Twenty20 Tournament.

== See also ==
- List of Chilaw Marians Cricket Club players
