= Nalin Wijesinghe =

Sri Lankan cricketer (born 1979)

Personal information
- Full name: Samantha Nalin Wijesinghe
- Born: 27 October 1979 (age 46)
- Source: Cricinfo, 22 April 2021

Nalin Wijesinghe (born 27 October 1979) is a Sri Lankan former cricketer. He played in 88 first-class and 58 List A matches between 1998/99 and 2016/17. He made his Twenty20 debut on 17 August 2004, for Sri Lanka Air Force Sports Club in the 2004 SLC Twenty20 Tournament.
