= Manoj Chanaka =

Sri Lankan cricketer (born 1984)

Personal information
- Full name: Payagala Udawattage Manoj Chanaka
- Born: 17 November 1984 (age 41)
- Source: Cricinfo, 31 October 2017

Manoj Chanaka (born 17 November 1984) is a Sri Lankan cricketer. He has played 37 first-class and 29 List A matches for several domestic sides in Sri Lanka since 2000/01. His last first-class match was for Panadura Sports Club in the 2010–11 Premier Trophy on 18 March 2011.

== See also ==
- List of Chilaw Marians Cricket Club players
