= Lanka de Silva =

Sri Lankan cricketer (born 1975)

Personal information
- Full name: Sanjeewa Kumara Lanka de Silva
- Born: 29 July 1975 (age 51); Kurunegala
- Batting: Right-handed
- Bowling: Right-arm offbreak
- Role: Wicket-keeper

International information
- National side: Sri Lanka (1997-1997)
- Test debut (cap 70): 19 November 1997 v India
- Last Test: 3 December 1997 v India
- ODI debut (cap 90): 18 July 1997 v India
- Last ODI: 8 November 1997 v South Africa

Career statistics
Competition	Test	ODI
Matches	3	11
Runs scored	36	161
Batting average	18.00	53.66
100s/50s	0/0	0/2
Top score	20*	57
Catches/stumpings	1/–	9/6
- Source: Cricinfo, 9 February 2006

Lanka de Silva (born 29 July 1975) is a Sri Lankan former cricketer who played in three Test matches and 11 One Day Internationals in 1997. He is also the current interim head coach of the Sri Lanka women's national cricket team.

== Domestic career ==
He made his Twenty20 debut on 17 August 2004, for Colombo Cricket Club in the 2004 SLC Twenty20 Tournament.

== International career ==
He played as a right-hand wicket-keeper batsman. de Silva is only the tenth player in Sri Lankan cricket history to pass 10,000 runs in first-class cricket after starting his career in the 1991/92 season for Kurunegala Youth Cricket Club.

He played three Test for Sri Lanka, all against Indian national cricket team when Sri Lanka toured India in 1997 without any success and lost his place to Romesh Kaluwitharana.

== Coaching career ==
In 2015, de Silva was named as head coach of Sri Lanka national cricket team replacing Jeevantha Kulatunga along with physio Neha Karnik. In August 2020, he was appointed as the interim head coach of the Sri Lanka women's cricket team replacing Harsha de Silva.
