= Dhanuka Pathirana =

Sri Lankan cricketer (born 1982)

Personal information
- Born: 26 May 1982 (age 44); Colombo, Sri Lanka
- Source: Cricinfo, 23 May 2017

Dhanuka Pathirana (born 26 May 1982) is a Sri Lankan cricketer. He played 85 first-class and 61 List A matches for various domestic teams in Sri Lanka between 2001 and 2012. He made his Twenty20 debut on 17 August 2004, for Burgher Recreation Club in the 2004 SLC Twenty20 Tournament.

In May 2017, he played for the Canadian national team in the 2017 ICC World Cricket League Division Three tournament. In January 2018, he was named in Canada's squad for the 2018 ICC World Cricket League Division Two tournament.
