= Manoj Mendis =

Sri Lankan cricketer (born 1974)

Personal information
- Full name: Balapuwaduge Charles Manoj Shiam Mendis
- Born: 13 November 1974 (age 51)
- Source: Cricinfo, 19 April 2021

Manoj Mendis (born 13 November 1974) is a Sri Lankan former cricketer. He played in 95 first-class and 50 List A matches between 1993/94 and 2004/05. He made his Twenty20 debut on 17 August 2004, for Burgher Recreation Club in the 2004 SLC Twenty20 Tournament. He later became a match referee, and was the match referee who raised concerns of ball tampering during a practice match on England's tour of Sri Lanka in 2012.
