= Chamila Gamage =

Sri Lankan cricketer (born 1979)

Personal information
- Full name: Materba Kanatha Gamage Chamila Premanath Lakshitha
- Born: 4 January 1979 (age 47); Unawatuna, Sri Lanka
- Height: 5 ft 11 in (180 cm)
- Batting: Right-handed
- Bowling: Right-arm fast-medium
- Role: Bowler

International information
- National side: Sri Lanka (2002–2003)
- Test debut (cap 90): 28 July 2002 v Bangladesh
- Last Test: 15 November 2002 v South Africa
- ODI debut (cap 111): 4 August 2002 v Bangladesh
- Last ODI: 21 January 2003 v Australia

Career statistics
Competition	Test	ODI
Matches	2	7
Runs scored	42	7
Batting average	14.00	7.00
100s/50s	0/0	0/0
Top score	40	4
Balls bowled	288	300
Wickets	5	8
Bowling average	31.60	31.75
5 wickets in innings	0	0
10 wickets in match	0	0
Best bowling	2/33	2/34
Catches/stumpings	1/–	0/–
- Source: Cricinfo, 9 February 2017

Materba Kanatha Gamage Chamila Premanath Lakshitha (born 4 January 1979), or Chamila Gamage, is a former Sri Lankan cricketer, who played twi Tests and 7 One Day Internationals in the early 2000s. He is a right-handed batsman and a right-arm fast-medium bowler. He is a past student of Richmond College, Galle. He made his Twenty20 debut on 17 August 2004, for Sri Lanka Air Force Sports Club in the 2004 SLC Twenty20 Tournament.

== International career ==
Gamage, who started his international career in July 2002 against Bangladesh, made an immediate impact in international cricket, taking a wicket with his first ever delivery in Test cricket, and being the first Sri Lankan to do so in the format.

He continued to play in three ensuing One Day Internationals for Sri Lanka, and when batting, has top-scored (in the same match) with 40. His last international appearance was an ODI against Australia in 2003.

== See also ==
- List of bowlers who have taken a wicket with their first ball in a format of international cricket
