= Rashan Peiris =

Sri Lankan cricketer (born 1982)

Personal information
- Born: 21 January 1982 (age 44); Panadura, Sri Lanka
- Source: ESPNcricinfo, 13 December 2016

Rashan Peiris (born 21 January 1982) is a Sri Lankan cricketer. He played 79 first-class and 50 List A matches between 2000 and 2009. He made his Twenty20 debut on 17 August 2004, for Colts Cricket Club in the 2004 SLC Twenty20 Tournament. He was also part of Sri Lanka's squad for the 2000 Under-19 Cricket World Cup.
