= SLC Twenty20 Tournament =

- Countries: Sri Lanka
- Administrator: Sri Lanka Cricket
- Format: Twenty20
- First edition: 2004
- Latest edition: 2020–21
- Tournament format: Double round-robin and knockout

SLC Twenty20 Tournament was a Twenty20 domestic cricket competition in Sri Lanka held by Sri Lanka Cricket. It was conducted from 2004 to 2007 and was held between the clubs in Sri Lanka. From 2008, SLC Super Provincial Twenty20 became the premier domestic Twenty20 competition in Sri Lanka. SLC Twenty20 Tournament returned in 2014–15.

== Tournament history ==
=== 2004 season ===
The 2004 Twenty20 Tournament was held between 17 August and 3 September 2004 in Colombo.

Winner: Chilaw Marians
Runner-up: Colts

=== 2005–06 season ===
The 2005–06 Twenty20 Tournament was held between 8 October and 5 November 2005.

Winner : SSC
Runner-up : Chilaw Marians

=== 2006–07 season ===
The 2006–07 Twenty20 Tournament was held between 28 February and 4 March 2007.

Winner : Ragama
Runner-up : Saracens Sports Club

=== 2014–15 season ===
Winner : Badureliya Cricket Club
Runner-up : Sinhalese Sports Club

=== 2017–18 season ===
Winner : Nondescripts Cricket Club
Runner-up : Colombo Cricket Club

=== 2018–19 season ===
Winner : Moors Sports Club
Runner-up : Nondescripts Cricket Club

=== 2019–20 season ===
Winner : Colombo Cricket Club
Runner-up : Chilaw Marians Cricket Club

=== 2020–21 season ===
Winner : Sinhalese Sports Club
Runner-up : Sri Lanka Army Sports Club
