= Pubudu Wickrama =

Sri Lankan cricketer (born 1980)

Personal information
- Full name: Willegodage Pubudu Wickrama
- Born: 28 December 1980 (age 45)
- Source: Cricinfo, 22 April 2021

Pubudu Wickrama (born 28 December 1980) is a Sri Lankan former cricketer. He played in 70 first-class and 41 List A matches between 1997/98 and 2008/09. He made his Twenty20 debut on 17 August 2004, for Sri Lanka Air Force Sports Club in the 2004 SLC Twenty20 Tournament.
