= Shantha Kalavitigoda =

Sri Lankan cricketer (born 1977)

Personal information
- Full name: Indika Shantha Kumara Kalavitigoda
- Born: 23 December 1977 (age 48); Colombo, Sri Lanka
- Height: 5 ft 6 in (168 cm)
- Batting: Right-handed
- Bowling: Legbreak

International information
- National side: Sri Lanka (2005)
- Only Test (cap 101): 11 April 2006 v New Zealand

Career statistics
Competition	Test	First-class
Matches	1	125
Runs scored	8	6,180
Batting average	4.00	32.18
100s/50s	0/0	12/28
Top score	7	169
Balls bowled	–	84
Wickets	–	0
Bowling average	–	–
5 wickets in innings	–	–
10 wickets in match	–	–
Best bowling	–	–
Catches/stumpings	2/–	110/–
- Source: Cricinfo, 24 May 2023

Shantha Kalavitigoda (born 23 December 1977) is a Sri Lankan former cricketer who played his only Test match in 2005. He was educated at Nalanda College Colombo. He made his Twenty20 debut on 17 August 2004, for Colts Cricket Club against Sri Lanka Air Force Sports Club in the 2004 SLC Twenty20 Tournament. He was born at Colombo in 1977.
