= Amila Weththasinghe =

Sri Lankan cricketer (born 1982)

Personal information
- Full name: Amila Chathuranga Weththasinghe
- Born: 3 January 1982 (age 44)
- Source: Cricinfo, 19 April 2021

Amila Weththasinghe (born 3 January 1982) is a Sri Lankan former cricketer. He played in 71 first-class and 55 List A matches between 2002/03 and 2013/14. Outside of Sri Lanka, Weththasinghe also played league cricket in Lincolnshire and Cumbria in England, and Grade cricket in Australia.
