= Gihan de Silva =

Sri Lankan cricketer (born 1985)

Personal information
- Born: 25 July 1985 (age 41); Colombo, Sri Lanka
- Source: Cricinfo, 30 January 2016

Gihan de Silva (born 25 July 1985) is a Sri Lankan former first-class cricketer who played for Moors Sports Club. He made his Twenty20 debut on 17 August 2004, for Bloomfield Cricket and Athletic Club in the 2004 SLC Twenty20 Tournament.
