= Gayan Wijekoon =

Sri Lankan cricketer (born 1976)

Gayan Wijekoon ගයාන් විජේකෝන්
Personal information
- Full name: Wijekoon Mudiyanselage Gayan Ramyakumara
- Born: 21 December 1976 (age 49); Gampaha, Sri Lanka
- Batting: Left-handed
- Bowling: Left arm medium
- Role: All-rounder

International information
- National side: Sri Lanka (2005-2007)
- Test debut (cap 102): July 13 2005 v West Indies
- Last Test: July 25 2005 v West Indies
- T20I debut (cap 18): 14 September 2007 v Kenya
- Last T20I: September 17 2007 v Pakistan

Domestic team information
- Years: Team
- 1996/97: Tamil Union Cricket and Athletic Club
- 1997/98: Sinhalese Sports Club
- 1998/99–2002/03: Tamil Union and Athletic Club
- 2003/04–present: Chilaw Marians Cricket Club

Career statistics
Competition	Test	T20I
Matches	2	3
Runs scored	38	1
Batting average	12.66	1.00
100s/50s	0/0	0/0
Top score	14	1*
Balls bowled	114	66
Wickets	2	2
Bowling average	33.00	50.50
5 wickets in innings	0	0
10 wickets in match	0	0
Best bowling	2/49	1/12
Catches/stumpings	0/–	0/–
- Source: Cricinfo, 22 September 2016

Wijekoon Mudiyanselage Gayan Ramyakumara (more commonly known as Gayan Wijekoon; born 21 December 1976) is a former Sri Lankan cricketer, who played 2 Tests and 3 T20Is for Sri Lanka. He is a left-handed batsman and a left-arm medium-pace bowler.

== Domestic career ==
Despite having played on several occasions for the Sri Lankan A team, he is yet to make the same impact for his country's full squad, with little but a selection to the New Zealand-touring squad of 2004/05. Before joining the Chilaw Marians, he opened the batting for Tamil Union. He made his Twenty20 debut on 17 August 2004, for Chilaw Marians Cricket Club in the 2004 SLC Twenty20 Tournament.
