= Galle Cricket Club =

Sri Lankan cricket club

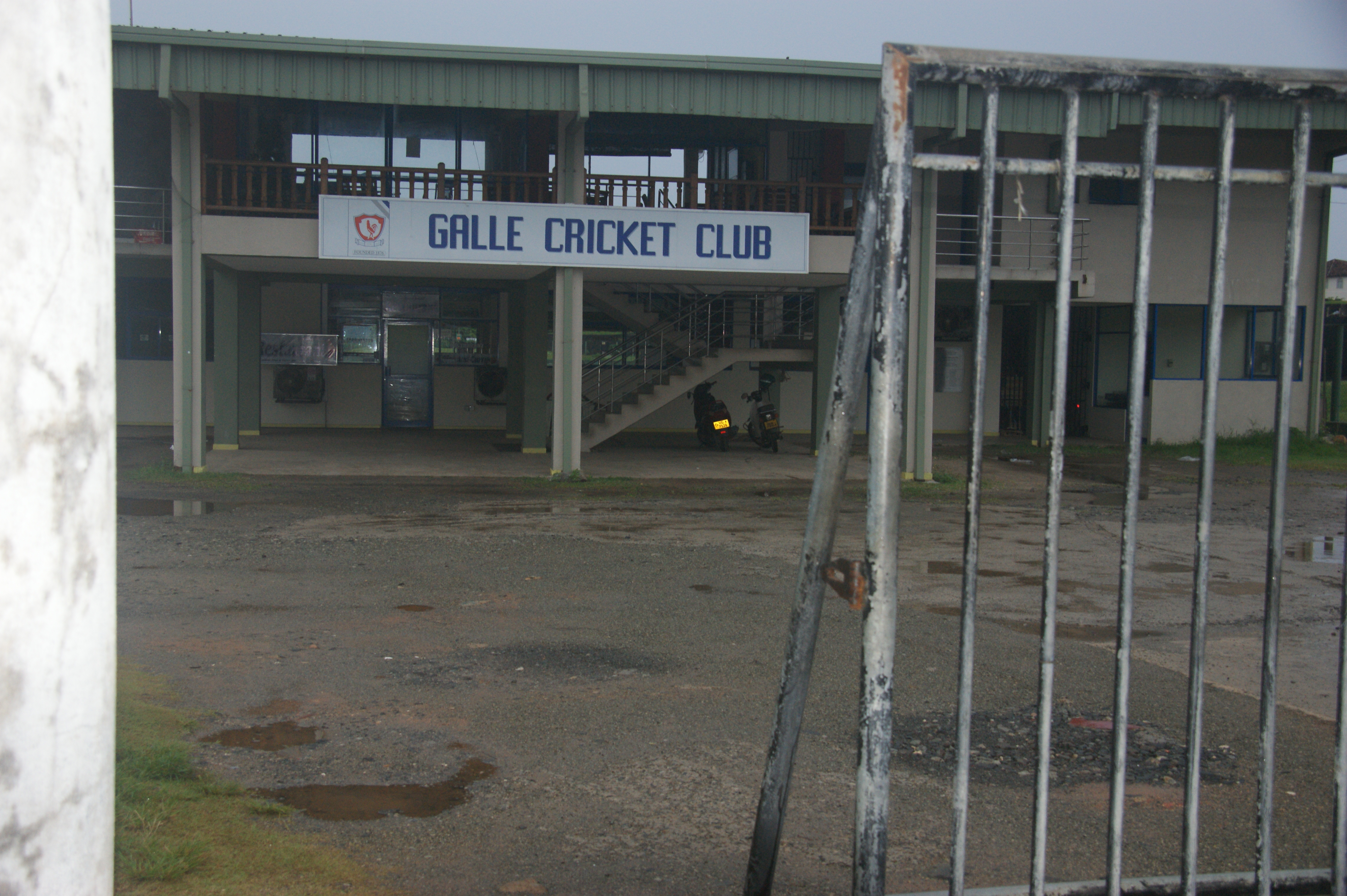

Team information
- Founded: 1876; 150 years ago
- Home ground: Galle International Stadium
- Capacity: 35,000

History
- Premier Trophy wins: none
- Premier Limited Overs Tournament wins: none
- Twenty20 Tournament wins: none

Galle Cricket Club is a first-class cricket team based in Galle, Sri Lanka. They play their home games at Galle International Stadium, which was reconstructed after the 2004 Indian Ocean tsunami. In the 2016–17 season, they took part in the Premier Trophy, Sri Lankan cricket's first-class competition.

== Notable players ==
- Late Douglas Dias Jayasinha
- Lasith Malinga
- Nuwan Kulasekara
- Romesh Kaluwitharana
- Champaka Ramanayake
- Jayananda Warnaweera
- Malinga Bandara
- Asoka de Silva

== Partnership records ==
- 1st – 104 HSS Fonseka & CM Withanage
- 2nd – 102 S Kodituwakku & TKD Sudarshana
- 3rd – 169* CM Withanage & WMPN Wanasinghe
- 4th – 183 S Kodituwakku & PD Rusintha
- 5th – 149 HSS Fonseka & DD Wickramasinghe
- 6th – 110 CRP Galappathy & CM Bandara
- 7th – 174 MKPB Kularatne & KMDN Kulasekara
- 8th – 154 PD Rusintha & LHD Dilhara
- 9th – 101 MMDPV Perera & MKPB Kularatne
- 10th – 87 DD Wickramasinghe & KG Perera
