= Sebastianites Cricket and Athletic Club =

Sri Lankan cricket team

- One Day name: Sebastianites Cricket and Athletic Club

Team information
- Home ground: De Soysa Stadium

History
- Premier Trophy wins: none
- Premier Limited Overs Tournament wins: none
- Inter-Provincial Twenty20#Twenty20 Tournament wins: none

Sebastianites Cricket and Athletic Club are a first-class cricket team based in Moratuwa, southwestern Sri Lanka. Their home ground is De Soysa Stadium.

== History ==
The club's name derives from its close association with St. Sebastian's College, Moratuwa, whose students are known as Sebastianites. The club played several first-class and List A matches at the college ground.

Sebastianites Cricket and Athletic Club competed in the first-class Premier Trophy for 20 seasons from 1990–91 to 2009–10. They played 184 matches, for 38 wins, 50 losses and 96 draws. In the same period they played 87 List A matches, with 37 wins, 42 losses, one tie and seven matches where a result could not be achieved. They played first-class cricket again during the Premier Trophy Tier B tournament in the 2019–20 season.

== Records ==
=== Partnership records ===
- 1st – 171 BCMS Mendis & SK Silva
- 2nd – 247 TM Dilshan & GG Ranga Yasalal
- 3rd – 308 SN Wijesinghe & RHS Silva
- 4th – 203 MMDNRG Perera & KHRK Fernando
- 5th – 181* BCMS Mendis & MMDNRG Perera
- 6th – 131 SHSMK Silva & KADJ Siriwardene
- 7th – 140 KHRK Fernando & KADM Fernando
- 8th – 149 WJM Fernando & KADM Fernando
- 9th – 164 BCMS Mendis & D Seneviratne
- 10th – 92 MPA Cooray & WJM Fernando

== Notable people ==
- Charuka Kahagalla (born 1988), left-handed batsman and right-arm off-break bowler
