= 2004 ACC Trophy =

- Administrator: Asian Cricket Council
- Cricket format: 50 overs per side
- Tournament format: Round robin with playoffs
- Host: Malaysia
- Champions: United Arab Emirates (3rd title)
- Participants: 15 teams
- Matches: 33/33
- Player of the series: (Oman) Hemin Desai
- Most runs: (United Arab Emirates) Arshad Ali (386)
- Most wickets: (Oman) Hemin Desai (21)
- Official website: asiancricket.org

The 2004 ACC Trophy was a cricket tournament in Malaysia, taking place between 12 and 24 June 2004. It gave Associate and Affiliate members of the Asian Cricket Council experience of international one-day cricket and also helps forms an essential part of regional rankings. The tournament was won by the UAE who defeated Oman in the final by 94 runs.

== Teams ==
The teams were separated into four groups: three groups of four teams and one group of three teams. The following teams took part in the tournament:

- Qatar
- Singapore
- United Arab Emirates
- Thailand
- Kuwait
- Malaysia
- Maldives
- Saudi Arabia
- Afghanistan
- Bahrain
- Hong Kong
- Oman
- Bhutan
- Iran
- Nepal

== Group stages ==
The top two from each group qualified for the quarter-finals.

=== Group A ===
Team	Pld	W	L	BP	CP	NRR	Pts
United Arab Emirates	3	3	0	3	0	4.208	18
Qatar	3	2	1	2	0	1.343	12
Singapore	3	1	2	1	0	–1.913	6
Thailand	3	0	3	0	0	–3.806	0

12 June 2004
(scorecard)

United Arab Emirates; 302/8 (50 overs)	v	Singapore; 69 all out (30.1 overs)
Arshad Ali 128 (128); Athipattu Balaji 5/55 (10 overs)		Iftekhar Haider 16; Rizwan Latif 4/4 (8.1 overs)

United Arab Emirates won by 233 runs
Bayuemas Oval, Kuala Lumpur
Umpires: Peter Manuel & Ivaturi Shivram
Player of the match: Arshad Ali (UAE)

13 June 2004
(scorecard)

Thailand; 103 all out (38.1 overs)	v	Qatar; 107/0 (14.2 overs)
Zeeshan Khan 29; Saleem Akhtar 3/8 (9.1 overs)		Omer Taj 58*

Qatar won by 10 wickets
Tenaga National Sports Complex, Kuala Lumpur
Umpires: Peter Manuel & S.K. Sharma
Player of the match: Omer Taj (Qatar)

14 June 2004
(scorecard)

Singapore; 275/4 (50 overs)	v	Thailand; 170 all out (49.4 overs)
Joshua Dearing 100* (99); Varin Silpadhanichkun 1/18 (6 overs)		Zeeshan Khan 44 (69); Pramodh Raja 3/26 (10 overs)

Singapore won by 105 runs
Royal Selangor Club, Kuala Lumpur
Umpires: Saleem Badar & S.K. Sharma
Player of the match: Joshua Dearing (Singapore)

15 June 2004
(scorecard)

Qatar; 111 all out (48 overs)	v	United Arab Emirates; 112/0 (22.3 overs)
Omer Taj 27 (83); Mohammad Tauqir 6/15 (10 overs)		Asim Saeed 66* (69)

United Arab Emirates won by 10 wickets
Bayuemas Oval, Kuala Lumpur
Umpires: Samiur Rahman & Ivaturi Shivram
Player of the match: Mohammad Tauqir (UAE)

16 June 2004
(scorecard)

Singapore; 107 all out (30.4 overs)	v	Qatar; 111/3 (18.3 overs)
Zeng Renchun 21 (46); Abbas Khan 2/11 (5 overs)		Omer Taj 68 (54); Athipattu Balaji 2/14 (4.3 overs)

Qatar won by 7 wickets
Kelab Aman, Kuala Lumpur
Umpires: Jasbir Singh & Saleem Badar
Player of the match: Omer Taj (Qatar)

17 June 2004
(scorecard)

Thailand; 78 all out (28.1 overs)	v	United Arab Emirates; 80/0 (10.5 overs)
Nishadh Rego 15 (48); Mohammad Tauqir 2/0 (1.1 overs)		Asghar Ali 41 (33)

United Arab Emirates won by 10 wickets
Selangor Turf Club, Kuala Lumpur
Umpires: Peter Manuel & Samiur Rahman
Player of the match: Asghar Ali (UAE)

=== Group B ===
Team	Pld	W	L	BP	CP	NRR	Pts
Kuwait	3	3	0	3	0	1.763	18
Malaysia	3	2	1	1	0	–0.140	11
Saudi Arabia	3	1	2	1	0	–0.173	6
Maldives	3	0	3	0	1	–1.479	1

12 June 2004
(scorecard)

Malaysia; 219/8 (50 overs)	v	Maldives; 197 all out (40 overs)
Suresh Navaratnam 81* (97); Mohamed Mahfooz 1/15 (4 overs)		Moosa Kaleem 70; Rohan Suppiah 2/24 (6 overs)

Malaysia won by 22 runs
Royal Selangor Club, Kuala Lumpur
Umpires: Sailab Hossain & Zameer Haider
Player of the match: Suresh Navaratnam (Malaysia)

13 June 2004
(scorecard)

Kuwait; 228 all out (48.3 overs)	v	Saudi Arabia; 176 all out (48.1 overs)
Khalid Butt 74; Wahajuddin Khwaja 3/41 (9 overs)		Rizwan Qayyum 42; Khalid Butt 3/21 (8 overs)

Kuwait won by 52 runs
Selangor Turf Club, Kuala Lumpur
Umpires: Afzaal Ahmed & Zameer Haider
Player of the match: Khalid Butt (Kuwait)

14 June 2004
(scorecard)

Saudi Arabia; 262 all out (49.4 overs)	v	Maldives; 171 all out (43.4 overs)
Sarfraz Ahmed 75 (104); Neesham Nasir 3/40 (10 overs)		Hassan Ibrahim 51 (72); Mohammad Moazzam 3/22 (6.4 overs)

Saudi Arabia won by 91 runs
Selangor Turf Club, Kuala Lumpur
Umpires: Afzaal Ahmed & Jasbir Singh

15 June 2004
(scorecard)

Kuwait; 226 all out (50 overs)	v	Malaysia; 118 all out (37.2 overs)
Hanees Babu 44 (98); Suresh Navaratnam 4/36 (10 overs)		Rohan Selvaratnam 37 (76); Azmatullah Mohammed 4/9 (7.2 overs)

Kuwait won by 108 runs
Selangor Turf Club, Kuala Lumpur
Umpires: M. Hussein & Jagath Nandakumar
Player of the match: Mohammad Ali (KUW)

16 June 2004
(scorecard)

Maldives; 163 all out (47.3 overs)	v	Kuwait; 164/2 (28.3 overs)
Hassan Ibrahim 34 (72); Rafat Khan 4/26 (10 overs)		Sibtain Raza 86 (86); Neesham Nasir 1/30 (7 overs)

Kuwait won by 8 wickets
Selangor Turf Club, Kuala Lumpur
Umpires: Peter Manuel & S.K. Sharma
Player of the match: Sibtain Raza (Kuwait)

17 June 2004
(scorecard)

Malaysia; 268/7 (50 overs)	v	Saudi Arabia; 203 all out (46.4 overs)
Suresh Navaratnam 88 (103); Naeem Amin 3/49 (7 overs)		Wahajuddin Khwaja 55 (63); Rohan Suppiah 3/25 (10 overs)

Malaysia won by 65 runs
Selangor Turf Club, Kuala Lumpur
Umpires: Afzaal Ahmed & Ivaturi Shivram

=== Group C ===
Team	Pld	W	L	BP	CP	NRR	Pts
Oman	3	3	0	0	0	0.273	15
Afghanistan	3	1	2	1	2	0.360	8
Hong Kong	3	1	2	0	2	-0.153	7
Bahrain	3	1	2	0	1	-0.527	6

12 June 2004
(scorecard)

Bahrain; 212/7 (50 overs)	v	Hong Kong; 188 all out (49.3 overs)
Qamar Saeed 79 (69); Sher Lama 3/49 (10 overs)		Rahul Sharma 62 (66); Zafar Zaheer 2/36 (6.3 overs)

Bahrain won by 24 runs
Selangor Turf Club, Kuala Lumpur
Umpires: Jasbir Singh & Jagath Nandakumar
Player of the match: Qamar Saeed (Bahrain)

13 June 2004
(scorecard)

Afghanistan; 202 all out (47.4 overs)	v	Oman; 204/6 (45.5 overs)
Nowroz Mangal 101 (133); Hemin Desai 6/43 (9.4 overs)		Hemin Desai 82; Mohammad Nabi 3/28 (10 overs)

Oman won by 4 wickets
Royal Selangor Club, Kuala Lumpur
Umpires: Jagath Nandakumar & Samiur Rahman
Player of the match: Hemin Desai (Oman)

14 June 2004
(scorecard)

Bahrain; 216 all out (49.2 overs)	v	Oman; 220/6 (48.3 overs)
Fahad Sadeq 46 (90); Mohammad Asif 3/29 (10 overs)		Azhar Ali 65* (100); Qamar Saeed 2/21 (10 overs)

Oman won by 4 wickets
Tenaga National Sports Complex, Kuala Lumpur
Umpires: Samiur Rahman & Ivaturi Shivram
Player of the match: Azhar Ali (Oman)

15 June 2004
(scorecard)

Hong Kong; 169 all out (49.1 overs)	v	Afghanistan; 157 all out (42 overs)
Manoj Cheruparambil 33 (61); Ahmed Shah 3/17 (8.1 overs)		Raees Ahmadzai 60 (76); Jawaid Iqbal 3/24 (9 overs)

Hong Kong won by 12 runs
Tenaga National Sports Complex, Kuala Lumpur
Umpires: Afzaal Ahmed & Jasbir Singh
Player of the match: Raees Ahmadzai (Afghanistan)

16 June 2004
(scorecard)

Bahrain; 172 all out (48 overs)	v	Afghanistan; 173/2 (29.5 overs)
Abdul Waheed 49 (89); Ahmed Shah 3/23 (10 overs)		Karim Sadiq 100 (102); Ashraf Yaqoob 1/30 (5 overs)

Afghanistan won by 8 wickets
Tenaga National Sports Complex, Kuala Lumpur
Umpires: Jagath Nandakumar & Zameer Haider
Player of the match: Karim Sadiq (Afghanistan)

17 June 2004
(scorecard)

Oman; 185 all out (50 overs)	v	Hong Kong; 174 all out (48.4 overs)
Rakesh Sharma 37 (53); Jawaid Iqbal 4/57 (9 overs)		Tim Smart 48 (102); Hemin Desai 5/29 (8.4 overs)

Oman won by 11 runs
Bayuemas Oval, Kuala Lumpur
Umpires: Sailab Hossain & Zameer Haider
Player of the match: Hemin Desai (Oman)

=== Group D ===
Team	Pld	W	L	BP	CP	NRR	Pts
Nepal	2	2	0	2	0	7.214	12
Bhutan	2	1	1	1	0	-0.283	6
Iran	2	0	2	0	0	-2.914	0

12 June 2004
(scorecard)

Bhutan; 91 all out (46 overs)	v	Nepal; 92/1 (13 overs)
Damber Gurung 31; Raj Pradhan 3/13 (7 overs)		Mehboob Alam 44 (31); Phuntsho Wangdi 1/26 (3 overs)

Nepal won by 9 wickets
Kelab Aman, Kuala Lumpur
Umpires: Saleem Badar & S.K. Sharma

13 June 2004
(scorecard)

Bhutan; 187 all out (47.1 overs)	v	Iran; 101 all out (32.1 overs)
Thinlay Wangchuk 48; Raez Mehrazar 4/30 (10 overs)		Mustafa Haji 37 (retired hurt); Lobzang Yonten 3/9 (5.1 overs)

Bhutan won by 86 runs
Kelab Aman, Kuala Lumpur
Umpires: Sailab Hossain & Saleem Badar
Player of the match: Thinlay Wangchuk (Bhutan)

14 June 2004
(scorecard)

Iran; 29 all out (23.4 overs)	v	Nepal; 30/0 (1.3 overs)
Hossein Ali 8 (22); Shakti Gauchan 5/1 (4.4 overs)		Paresh Lohani 24 (9)

Nepal won by 10 wickets
Kelab Aman, Kuala Lumpur
Umpires: Peter Manuel & Zameer Haider
Player of the match: Mehboob Alam (Nepal)

== Quarter-finals ==
19 June 2004
(scorecard)

Kuwait; 242 all out (49.4 overs)	v	Afghanistan; 193 all out (44.2 overs)
Khalid Butt 117; Nowroz Mangal 4/27 (10 overs)		Nowroz Mangal 63; Azmatullah 3/38 (9.2 overs)

Kuwait won by 49 runs
Kelab Aman, Kuala Lumpur
Umpires: Jasbir Singh & Sailab Hossain

19 June 2004
(scorecard)

Bhutan; 70 all out (40.3 overs)	v	Oman; 71/0 (4.4 overs)
Manoj Adhikari 14; Hemal Mehta 4/6 (10 overs)		Adnan Ilyas 50 (16)

Oman won by 10 wickets
Tenaga National Sports Complex, Kuala Lumpur
Umpires: Saleem Badar & S.K. Sharma

19 June 2004
(scorecard)

United Arab Emirates; 267 all out (49.5 overs)	v	Malaysia; 206 all out (47.2 overs)
Syed Maqsood 83 (97); Suresh Navaratnam 4/46 (9.5 overs)		Rakesh Madhavan 68; Syed Maqsood 4/43 (8 overs)

United Arab Emirates won by 61 runs
Royal Selangor Club, Kuala Lumpur
Umpires: Jagath Nandakumar & Ivaturi Shivram
Player of the match: Syed Maqsood (UAE)

19 June 2004
(scorecard)

Nepal; 164/9 (50 overs)	v	Qatar; 165/6 (46.4 overs)
Sharad Vesawkar 49; Qamar Sadiq 3/35 (10 overs)		Omer Taj 56; Mehboob Alam 1/12 (5 overs)

Qatar won by 4 wickets
Bayuemas Oval, Kuala Lumpur
Umpires: Afzaal Ahmed & Samiur Rahman

== 5th place play-off semi-finals ==
20 June 2004
(scorecard)

Malaysia; 121 all out (35.5 overs)	v	Afghanistan; 122/7 (34.2 overs)
Shankar Retinam 33 (60); Nowroz Mangal 2/7 (2.4 overs)		Asadullah Khan 45 (92); Suresh Navaratnam 2/44 (10 overs)

Afghanistan won by 3 wickets
Tenaga National Sports Complex, Kuala Lumpur
Umpires: Afzaal Ahmed & S.K. Sharma
Player of the match: Asadullah Khan (Afghanistan)

20 June 2004
(scorecard)

Bhutan; 72 all out (37.4 overs)	v	Nepal; 76/4 (13 overs)
Tshering Dorji 20 (58); Raj Pradhan 4/21 (8 overs)		Mehboob Alam 42 (31); Phuntsho Wangdi 2/21 (4 overs)

Nepal won by 6 wickets
Bayuemas Oval, Kuala Lumpur
Umpires: Jagath Nandakumar & Zameer Haider
Player of the match: Mehboob Alam (Nepal)

== Semi-final ==
20 June 2004
(scorecard)

United Arab Emirates; 338/7 (50 overs)	v	Kuwait; 218 all out (35.4 overs)
Arshad Ali 118 (125); Azmatullah 3/57 (10 overs)		Khalid Butt 114 (51); Mohammad Tauqir 4/39 (10 overs)

United Arab Emirates won by 120 runs
Royal Selangor Club, Kuala Lumpur
Umpires: Saleem Badar & Ivaturi Shivram
Player of the match: Khalid Butt (Kuwait)

20 June 2004
(scorecard)

Qatar; 158 all out (45.3 overs)	v	Oman; 159/6 (33.5 overs)
Abbas Khan 72 (93); Hemin Desai 3/26 (9 overs)		Adnan Ilyas 39; Qamar Sadiq 3/28 (7.5 overs)

Oman won by 4 wickets
Kelab Aman, Kuala Lumpur
Umpires: Jasbir Singh & Peter Manuel
Player of the match: Abbas Khan (Qatar)

== 5th place play-off ==
21 June 2004
(scorecard)

Nepal; 147 all out (48.2 overs)	v	Afghanistan; 100 all out (41.2 overs)
Paras Khadka 34; Ahmed Shah 5/14 (10 overs)		Ahmed Shah 30; Raj Pradhan 4/20 (10 overs)

Nepal won by 47 runs
Kelab Aman, Kuala Lumpur
Umpires: Samiur Rahman & Zameer Haider
Player of the match: Raj Pradhan (Nepal)

== 3rd place play-off ==
21 June 2004
(scorecard)

Kuwait; 217 all out (49.5 overs)	v	Qatar; 192 all out (46.4 overs)
Azmatullah 84; Saleem Akhtar 2/11 (10 overs)		Omer Taj 52; Khalid Butt 3/32 (10 overs)

Kuwait won by 25 runs
Kelab Aman, Kuala Lumpur
Umpires: Afzaal Ahmed & Sailab Hossain
Player of the match: Azmatullah (Kuwait)

== Final ==
22 June 2004
(scorecard)

United Arab Emirates; 253/7 (50 overs)	v	Oman; 159 all out (44 overs)
Arshad Ali 77 (105); Hemal Mehta 3/38 (10 overs)		Hemal Mehta 39; Mohammad Tauqir 3/26 (9 overs)

United Arab Emirates won by 94 runs
Bayuemas Oval, Kuala Lumpur
Umpires: Peter Manuel & Ivaturi Shivram
Player of the match: Ali Asad (UAE)

== Statistics ==
Most runs		Most wickets	
(United Arab Emirates) Arshad Ali	286	(Oman) Hemin Desai	21
(Kuwait) Khalid Butt	342	(United Arab Emirates) Mohammad Tauqir	16
(Afghanistan) Nowroz Mangal	271	(Malaysia) Suresh Navaratnam	15
(United Arab Emirates) Asim Saeed	267	(Kuwait) Azmatullah	14
(Qatar) Omer Taj	261	(Nepal) Mehboob Alam	12

Ranking	Team	Status
1	United Arab Emirates	(gold) Champion
2	Oman	(silver) Runners Up
3	Kuwait	
4	Qatar	
5	Nepal	
6	Afghanistan	
7	Malaysia	
8	Bhutan	
9	Hong Kong	
10	Saudi Arabia	
11	Bahrain	
12	Singapore	
13	Maldives	
14	Iran	
15	Thailand	
