= Bangladeshi cricket team in Sri Lanka in 2007 =

Bangladesh in Sri Lanka in 2007
	Sri Lanka	Bangladesh
- Dates: 20 June – 24 July 2007
Captains	Mahela Jayawardene	Mohammad Ashraful

Test series
- Result: Sri Lanka won the 3-match series 3–0
Most runs	Kumar Sangakkara (428)	Mohammad Ashraful (218)
Most wickets	Muttiah Muralitharan (26)	Shahadat Hossain (4)
- Player of the series: Muttiah Muralitharan (SL)

One Day International series
- Results: Sri Lanka won the 3-match series 3–0
Most runs	Chamara Silva (101)	Aftab Ahmed (63)
Most wickets	Sanath Jayasuriya (5)	Syed Rasel (4)
- Player of the series: Sanath Jayasuriya (SL)

The Bangladesh cricket team toured Sri Lanka for three Test matches and three One Day Internationals in June and July 2007. This series held Mohammad Ashraful's first Test and ODI matches as captain of Bangladesh. Sri Lanka ended up winning all the Test matches and One-day Internationals.

== Squad lists ==
ODI Squads		Test Squads	
Bangladesh	Sri Lanka	Bangladesh	Sri Lanka
Mohammad Ashraful (c)	Mahela Jayawardene (c)	Mohammad Ashraful (c)	Mahela Jayawardene (c)
Mushfiqur Rahim (wk)	Kumar Sangakkara (wk)	Mushfiqur Rahim (wk)	Prasanna Jayawardene (wk)
Khaled Mashud (wk) (Withdrawn)		Khaled Mashud (wk)	
Aftab Ahmed	Malinga Bandara	Habibul Bashar	Marvan Atapattu (Withdrawn)
Habibul Bashar (Withdrawn)	Upul Chandana	Shakib Al Hasan	Malinga Bandara
Shakib Al Hasan	Tillakaratne Dilshan	Shahadat Hossain	Sujeewa de Silva
Shahadat Hossain	Dilhara Fernando	Mehrab Hossain Jr	Dilhara Fernando
Mehrab Hossain Jr	Sanath Jayasuriya	Mashrafe Mortaza	Farveez Maharoof
Tushar Imran	Chamara Kapugedera	Javed Omar	Lasith Malinga
Tamim Iqbal	Nuwan Kulasekara	Shahriar Nafees	Muttiah Muralitharan
Mohammad Mahmudullah	Farveez Maharoof	Mohammad Rafique	Sangakkara
Mashrafe Mortaza	Lasith Malinga	Syed Rasel	Chamara Silva
Javed Omar	Jehan Mubarak	Abdur Razzak	Upul Tharanga
Shahriar Nafees	Chamara Silva	Rajin Saleh	Chaminda Vaas
Mohammad Rafique (Withdrawn)	Upul Tharanga	Mohammad Sharif	Malinda Warnapura
Syed Rasel	Chaminda Vaas	Tushar Imran (added 5 July)	
Abdur Razzak			
Farhad Reza			
Rajin Saleh (Withdrawn)			
Mohammad Sharif (Withdrawn)			

== Test series ==
=== 1st Test ===
25–28 June
Scorecard

Bangladesh	v	Sri Lanka
89 (32.3 overs); Shakib Al Hasan 16 (16); Shahriar Nafees 15 (30); Muttiah Muralitharan 5/15 (7.3 overs); Dilhara Fernando 3/33 (11 overs)		577/6 (dec) (135.5 overs); Mahela Jayawardene 127 (159); Prasanna Jayawardene 120* (191); Shahadat Hossain 2/102 (18 overs); Mashrafe Mortaza 1/72 (19 overs)
254 (87.1 overs); Javed Omar 62 (118); Rajin Saleh 51 (177); Muttiah Muralitharan 4/87 (36.1 overs); Lasith Malinga 4/80 (17 overs)

Sri Lanka won by an innings and 234 runs
R Premadasa, Colombo, Sri Lanka
Umpires: Asad Rauf (Pak) and Suresh Shastri (Ind)
Player of the match: Muttiah Muralitharan (SL)

Chaminda Vaas and Prasanna Jayawardene both recorded their first Test career centuries, both during the same partnership during the Sri Lankan innings. In addition, the partnership – worth 223 runs without dismissal (Sri Lanka declared their innings once Vaas reached his hundred) – set a seventh-wicket record for Sri Lanka.

=== 2nd Test ===
3–5 July
Scorecard

Bangladesh	v	Sri Lanka
62 (26 overs); Rajin Saleh 21 (62); Mushfiqur Rahim 9 (14); Muttiah Muralitharan 4/14 (5.2 overs); Lasith Malinga 4/25 (9 overs)		451/6 (dec) (124.5 overs); Kumar Sangakkara 200* (325); Malinda Warnapura 82 (140); Mehrab Hossain jnr 2/29 (7.5 overs); Mashrafe Mortaza 2/77 (30 overs)
299 (86.2 overs); Mohammad Ashraful 129* (236); Mushfiqur Rahim 80 (183); Chaminda Vaas 4/55 (20.2 overs); Dilhara Fernando 3/60 (17 overs)

Sri Lanka won by an innings and 90 runs
Paikiasothy Saravanamuttu Stadium, Colombo, Sri Lanka
Umpires: Asad Rauf (Pak) and Rudi Koertzen (SA)
Player of the match: Kumar Sangakkara (SL)

- Play stopped after 45.3 overs on day 1 due to rain

Bangladesh's first innings of 62 all out is the lowest innings total for Bangladesh. Mohammad Ashraful and Mushfiqur Rahim 6th wicket partnership of 191 was a record partnership for Bangladesh.

=== 3rd Test ===
11–14 July
Scorecard

Bangladesh	v	Sri Lanka
131 (48.5 overs); Shahriar Nafees 29 (77); Mohammad Ashraful 26 (51); Muttiah Muralitharan 6/28 (14.5 overs); Farveez Maharoof 1/21 (8 overs)		500/4 (dec) (107 overs); Kumar Sangakkara 222* (277); Mahela Jayawardene 165 (210); Syed Rasel 3/104 (31 overs)
176 (59 overs); Shahriar Nafees 64 (115); Javed Omar 22 (56); Muttiah Muralitharan 6/54 (21 overs); Sujeewa de Silva 2/34 (12 overs)

Sri Lanka won by an innings and 193 runs
Asgiriya Stadium, Kandy, Sri Lanka
Umpires: Rudi Koertzen (SA) and Suresh Shastri (Ind)
Player of the match: Muttiah Muralitharan (SL)

- Play stopped after 17.4 overs on day 1 due to rain.
- Play stopped after 29 overs on day 1 due to bad light.
- Play stopped after 19.5 overs on day 2 due to rain

Day 1

With the 3 Test series already won Sri Lanka made 3 changes to their side. Chaminda Vaas was replaced by Sujeewa de Silva, while Upul Tharanga, recovered from a heel injury to take the place of Malinda Warnapura. Farveez Maharoof came in for Dilhara Fernando. Bangladesh made 2 changes to their side with Syed Rasel replacing Mohammad Sharif and Tushar Imran in for Mehrab Hossain Jnr.

For the third time in this Test series Mahela Jayawardene won the toss and chose to field. This meant that Javed Omar and Shahriar Nafees opened for Bangladesh. Lasith Malinga made an early breakthrough dismissing Omar lbw for 8 in the second over. This wicket would be the only wicket in the session as Habibul Bashar and Nafees batted until play was stopped due to rain and Bangladesh were on 44/1

On the fourth ball after the rain interval Habibul Bashar was caught behind. This resulted in Bangladesh making slow progress scoring only 5 runs in 5 overs before play was interrupted by rain again. Play resumed with the score at 53/2 and Bangladesh struggled to get runs and went through 3 maiden overs. Rajin Saleh was eventually removed, caught edging a doosra from Muralitharan to Mahela Jayawardene. Lack of scoring opportunities then saw Nafees take a rash shot which resulted in him being caught. This was the final wicket of the day and Bangladesh scored eight more runs in the day and the score was 72/4 at the end of day 1.

Day 2

A wet outfield threatened to delay the start of play but sunny conditions insured that the game started at the planned time of 10:30. Bangladesh began the day at 72/4 with Tushar Imran on 6 and Mohammed Ashraful on 4. Steady progress was made with 20 runs scored of 5.3 overs before Imran was caught mistiming a drive shot. A boundary by Ashraful in the 37th over saw Bangladesh pass the 100 mark and the over finished 102/5. Shortly afterwards however Ashraful was caught behind with the score on a nelson and Bangladesh were 111/6. Bangladesh scored 20 runs for the final 4 wickets as Mashrafe Mortaza and Mohammad Rafique were caught and bowled by Muralitharan while Shahadat Hossain and Syed Rasel both went for a duck. At the end of Bangladesh's first innings Shahriar Nafees was the leading scorer with 29 runs, while Muralitharan was the top wicket taker getting 6 wickets in the innings.

The rest of the day was hampered by rain and bad light with Sri Lanka only managing to bat for 8.4 overs scoring a quick 30 without loss before the end of the day 2.

Day 3

The third day was dominated by Sri Lanka with scores of 165 and 222 by Mahela Jayawardene and Sangakkara respectively which included a 311 3rd wicket partnership.

The day started well for Bangladesh as they got the early wickets of Upul Tharanga and Michael Vandort. Upul Tharanga was bowled by Syed Rasel in the 14th over while Michael Vandort was trapped lbw and Sri Lanka were 74/2. Mahela Jayawardene and Sangakkara then put on 311 for the 3rd wicket before Jayawardene was dismissed on 165 caught by Mohammed Ashraful of Syed Rasel's bowling. Sangakkara was dropped by Mohammed Ashraful on 188 but he managed to run out Chamara Silva instead. On the 104th over Sangakkara made his second double century in the series hitting a full toss down square leg for 4. Quick batting by Tillakaratne Dilshan and Sangakkara meant that Sri Lanka finished the day on 500/4.

Day 4

Sri Lanka made an overnight declaration which meant that Bangladesh required 369 runs to avoid another innings defeat.

Omar and Nafees opened for Bangladesh once again and showed some resistance scoring 47 before Javed Omar edged a bouncer of Lasith Malinga and was caught in the 16th over by Sangakkara. Shahriar Nafees was the first Bangladeshi to get a half century in this Test reaching it in 70 balls. Soon after Habibul Bashar was bowled by Muralitharan and Bangladesh were 98/2. 6 more overs were played in the morning session before play was stopped due to rain and lunch was taken early with the score at 106/2.

Soon after the restart Shahriar Nafees is deceived by a spinning delivery and is out caught. Ashraful soon followed as he was trappt lbw with the score on 138/4. The next 4 runs then cost Bangladesh 2 wickets as Mushfiqur Rahim was caught by Upul Tharanga at point while Rajin Saleh was caught behind going for a duck and Bangladesh were 142/6. Mashrafe Mortaza and Tushar Imran made 24 runs for the 7th wicket before Mortaza's attempted six didn't carry and was caught at long on by the sub. The final 3 wickets went for 8 runs, with the final wicket of Syed Rasel being Muralitharan's 700th wicket and Sri Lanka won by an innings and 193 runs.

Muttiah Muralitharan was the man of the match with two five-wicket hauls of 6/28 and 6/54 in the Test, getting his 20th 10-wicket haul in the process and had match figures of 12/82. Muttiah Muralitharan was also voted man of the series.

== ODI series ==
=== 1st ODI ===
20 July
scorecard

Sri Lanka; 234/6 (50 overs)	v	Bangladesh; 164 (40.3 overs)
Chamara Silva 65 (76); Upul Tharanga 57 (104); Mashrafe Mortaza 2/31 (10 overs)		Shahriar Nafees 33 (38); Dilhara Fernando 4/24 (9 overs)

Sri Lanka won by 70 runs
Paikiasothy Saravanamuttu Stadium, Colombo, Sri Lanka
Umpires: Asoka de Silva (SL) and Rudi Koertzen (SA)
Player of the match: Dilhara Fernando (SL)

=== 2nd ODI ===
23 July
Scorecard

Bangladesh; 137 (46.5 overs)	v	Sri Lanka; 141/5 (31.1 overs)
Aftab Ahmed 47 (85); Mohammad Ashraful 29 (59); Sanath Jayasuriya 4/31 (9.5 overs); Lasith Malinga 3/22 (9 overs)		Chamara Silva 36 (49); Upul Tharanga 28 (25); Syed Rasel 2/39 (10 overs); Mohammad Ashraful 1/2 (1 over)

Sri Lanka won by 5 wickets
R Premadasa, Colombo, Sri Lanka
Umpires: Rudi Koertzen (SA) and Tyron Wijewardene (SL)
Player of the match: Sanath Jayasuriya (SL)

=== 3rd ODI ===
25 July
Scorecard

Sri Lanka; 196 (39.5 overs)	v	Bangladesh; 157 (37.1 overs)
Jehan Mubarak 72 (82); Abdur Razzak 3/47 (7.5 overs)		Tamim Iqbal 55 (74); Sanath Jayasuriya 4/14 (4 overs)

Sri Lanka won by 39 runs
R Premadasa, Colombo, Sri Lanka
Umpires: Asoka De Silva (SL) and Rudi Koertzen (SA)
Player of the match: Jehan Mubarak (SL)

- Play reduced to 40 overs due to rain

== Tour matches ==
=== Bangladeshis v Sri Lanka A – First-class match ===
20–22 June
Scorecard

Bangladesh; 245/8 (dec) (104 overs)	v	Sri Lanka A 170/4 (36.3 overs)
Habibul Bashar 63 (168); Mohammad Ashraful 37 (89); Rangana Herath 3/63 (26 overs); Chanaka Welegedara 2/59 (21 overs)		Mahela Udawatte 53 (52); Michael Vandort 38 (42); Abdur Razzak 1/15 (4 overs); Mohammad Sharif 1/25 (7.3 overs)

Match drawn
Colts Cricket Club, Colombo, Sri Lanka
Umpires: Rohitha Kottahachchi (SL) and Grashan Liyanage (SL)

- Only 25 overs bowled on day 2 due to rain
- Only 36.3 overs bowled on day 3 due to rain

=== Bangladeshis v Sri Lanka XI ===
18 July
scorecard

Sri Lanka XI; 241/5 (50 overs)	v	Bangladesh; 242/7 (49.2 overs)
Tharanga Paranavitana 63* (69); Ian Daniel 57 (67); Syed Rasel 2/37 (8 overs); Shakib Al Hasan 2/42 (10 overs)		Aftab Ahmed 92* (91); Tamim Iqbal 45 (69); Lasith Fernando 2/18 (7 overs); Nuwan Kulasekara 2/36 (10 overs)

Bangladesh won by 3 wickets
Police Park Ground, Colombo, Sri Lanka
Umpires: Jagath Nandakumar (SL) and Atula Senanayake (SL)
