= English cricket team in Sri Lanka in 2007–08 =

England cricket team in Sri Lanka in 2007–08
	England	Sri Lanka
- Dates: 28 September – 22 December 2007
Captains	Michael Vaughan (Test), Paul Collingwood (ODI)	Mahela Jayawardene

Test series
- Result: Sri Lanka won the 3-match series 1–0
Most runs	Cook 278; Bell 261; Vaughan 215	Jayawardene 474; Sangakkara 291; Vandort 213
Most wickets	Panesar 8 Hoggard 7 Harmison 6	Muralitharan 19; Vaas 11; Malinga 6
- Player of the series: Mahela Jayawardene (Sri Lanka)

One Day International series
- Results: England won the 5-match series 3–2
Most runs	Cook 155; Shah 121; Pietersen 112	Silva 184; Sangakkara 151; Dilshan 136
Most wickets	Sidebottom 12; Broad 11; Swann 7	Fernando 12; Maharoof 10; Malinga 6
- Player of the series: Ryan Sidebottom (England)

The England cricket team toured Sri Lanka from 28 September to 22 December 2007. England made two trips to Sri Lanka in this tour with the ODI team arriving on 25 September before returning to England on 15 October. The Test team arrived on 15 November and stayed there for the remainder of the tour. The tour included three Test matches and five ODIs.

== Sri Lankan cricket team ==
Sri Lanka entered the series ranked fourth at both ODI and Test levels. The team had good recent performances in ODI reaching the final of 2007 Cricket World Cup and beat Bangladesh 3–0. Their recent record against England was good winning seven of the last ten ODI matches which included a whitewash series of 5–0 in 2006. With the injury to Andrew Flintoff captain Mahela Jayawardene wished to exploit his absence saying his presence adds balance to the team.

== English cricket team ==
England ranked seventh in the ODI rankings had had mixed performances winning the 2006–07 Commonwealth Bank Series and the recent ODI series against India but lost to the West Indies and performed poorly in the 2007 Cricket World Cup. The team had a new look with new captain Paul Collingwood going on his first away tour while James Anderson and Stuart Broad formed a new front line attack. Other relative newcomers to the squad were all-rounders Dimitri Mascarenhas and Ravi Bopara. England had still not resolved their keeping problem with Matt Prior not being offered a central contract and had selected five wicketkeepers in the past 12 months; Chris Read, Geraint Jones, Paul Nixon, Prior and Phil Mustard.

Unlike the ODI team the Test team was ranked higher than Sri Lanka but with England playing away the series was expected to be a close affair. Their recent Test performances had been disappointing however, suffering a whitewash in the last Ashes tour and losing their first home series in six years to India.

== Squads ==
Muttiah Muralitharan missed the ODI series due to a biceps injury and Kaushal Lokuarachchi was called up as a replacement.

Matt Prior was originally included in England's ODI squad but was withdrawn from the squad after breaking his thumb in a training session prior to the New Zealand game in the 2007 ICC World Twenty20. Phil Mustard was selected as his replacement which was his first England call-up while Graeme Swann gained his first England call-up in seven years. On 20 September Andrew Flintoff pulled out of the ODI series after suffering a recurrence of an ankle injury and was replaced by Chris Tremlett. Flintoff was ruled out of the Test series so he could undergo further keyhole ankle surgery .

For Sri Lanka, Sanath Jayasuriya announced his retirement from Test cricket on Day 3 of the first Test, effective at the end of that Test. Tillakaratne Dilshan and Chanaka Welegedara joined the squad for the third Test. Dilshan replaced the ineffective Jehan Mubarak. Welegedara earned his first Test cap as a substitute for Dilhara Fernando, who was forced to undergo ankle surgery for an injury suffered during Sri Lanka's 2007 tour to Australia that clearly affected him during the first two Tests.

Test Squads		ODI Squads	
Sri Lanka	England	Sri Lanka	England
Mahela Jayawardene (c)	Michael Vaughan (c)	Mahela Jayawardene (c)	Paul Collingwood (c)
Prasanna Jayawardene (wk)	Matt Prior (wk)	Kumar Sangakkara (wk)	Phil Mustard (wk)
Malinga Bandara	James Anderson	Tillakaratne Dilshan	James Anderson
Sujeewa de Silva	Ian Bell	Dilhara Fernando	Ian Bell
Tillakaratne Dilshan	Ravi Bopara	Sanath Jayasuriya	Ravi Bopara
Dilhara Fernando	Stuart Broad	Kaushal Lokuarachchi	Stuart Broad
Sanath Jayasuriya (retired from Test cricket after first Test)	Paul Collingwood	Farveez Maharoof	Alastair Cook
Lasith Malinga	Alastair Cook	Lasith Malinga	Dimitri Mascarenhas
Jehan Mubarak	Steve Harmison	Jehan Mubarak	Monty Panesar
Muttiah Muralitharan	Matthew Hoggard	Dilruwan Perera	Kevin Pietersen
Kumar Sangakkara	Phil Mustard	Chamara Silva	Owais Shah
Chamara Silva	Monty Panesar	Upul Tharanga	Ryan Sidebottom
Upul Tharanga	Kevin Pietersen	Chaminda Vaas	Graeme Swann
Chaminda Vaas	Owais Shah	Gayan Wijekoon	Chris Tremlett
Michael Vandort	Ryan Sidebottom	Muttiah Muralitharan (withdrawn)	Luke Wright
Chanaka Welegedara	Graeme Swann		Matt Prior (withdrawn)
			Andrew Flintoff (withdrawn)
Sources: Cricinfo.com. Published: 23 November 2007. Cricinfo.com. Published: 7 December 2007. Cricinfo.com. Published: 14 December 2007.	Source: Cricinfo.com. Published: 19 October 2007.	Source: Cricinfo.com. Published: 18 September 2007.	Source: Cricinfo.com. Published: 20 September 2007.

== Tour match ==
28 September
(scorecard)

England; 314/4 (50 overs)	v	Sri Lanka Cricket XI; 234 (45.2 overs)
Ian Bell 131* (121); Gihan Rupasinghe 2/66 (9 overs)		Chamara Kapugedera 75 (87); James Anderson 3/43 (8 overs)

England won by 80 runs
P. Saravanamuttu Stadium, Colombo, Sri Lanka
Umpires: Ranmor Martinesz (SRI) and Jagath Nandakumar (SRI)

Paul Collingwood, Stuart Broad, Luke Wright, Alastair Cook and Kevin Pietersen all recovered from a stomach virus to start the match. Due to special regulations both teams consisted of 14 players with 11 of these players fielding/batting. England won the toss and chose to bat first and initially scored slowly with Mustard taking 15 balls to get off the mark. Cook and Bell established a strong partnership of 89 before Pietersen scored 50 from only 29 deliveries. Quick runs from Bopara and then Shah insured England set a good target of 314/4 with Bell scoring an unbeaten 131.

Sri Lanka suffered two early setbacks but made a minor recovery with Chamara Kapugedera and Indika de Saram putting on 65 for the third wicket. Wickets then fell at regular intervals and when Kapugedera was caught off the bowling of James Anderson the game was effectively over. Ashan Priyanjan and Malinga Bandara provided some resistance but England still managed to gain a comfortable 80 run victory.

== ODI series ==
=== 1st ODI ===
1 October (D/N)
(scorecard)

Sri Lanka; 269/7 (50 overs)	v	England; 150 (34.5 overs)
Mahela Jayawardene 66 (74); Paul Collingwood 2/44 (10 overs)		Alastair Cook 46 (80); Farveez Maharoof 4/31 (10 overs)

Sri Lanka won by 119 runs
Rangiri Dambulla International Stadium, Dambulla, Sri Lanka
Umpires: Asoka de Silva (SRI) and Rudi Koertzen (RSA)
Player of the match: Farveez Maharoof (SRI)

Graeme Swann was picked ahead of Monty Panesar as England decided not to field with a second spinner. The conditions on the day were windy with little swing in the wicket. The pitch was recently re-laid resulting in little pace and variable bounce which was to trouble both teams in the match. Paul Collingwood commented that the wicket was like an English wicket.

Sri Lanka won the toss and chose to bat and started well with Upul Tharanga and Sanath Jayasuriya adding 77 for the opening wicket. After 30 overs Sri Lanka were in a strong position of 150/2 and were looking to set a large total but when Swann got Kumar Sangakkara stumped the rate slowed. This was Swann's first ODI wicket and Phil Mustard's first stumping for England. Sri Lanka could not accelerate in the final overs, losing four wickets in quick succession but still managed to finish on a good total of 269/7. Numerous interruptions in the match meant that Sri Lanka's first innings went over the allocated time as there were problems with the sightscreens, bails falling off and even a dog running across the outfield.

As a result of a prolonged innings the break was reduced to 30 minutes. A dropt catch at second slip allowed Mustard to get of the mark, this would be a sign of things to come as England collapsed from 43/0 to 106/6 losing Mustard, Bell, Pietersen and Collingwood within 15 runs. A stand of 42 between Swann and Ravi Bopara delayed the end but England still lost by 119 runs their biggest defeat to Sri Lanka in terms of runs.

Farveez Maharoof was awarded man of the match with bowling figures of 4/31 and was compared to Glenn McGrath with his bowling performance on the day. The winning captain Jawardere said patience with the bat was the key to setting a good score of 270 stating that if he aimed for 300 he would have risked being bowled out on less than 250. Collingwood was disappointed with England's batting effort and admitted that Sri Lanka's bowling was at a level that his team wanted to achieve.

=== 2nd ODI ===
4 October (D/N)
(scorecard)

England; 234/8 (50 overs)	v	Sri Lanka; 169 (44.3 overs)
Owais Shah 82 (92); Farveez Maharoof 3/30 (9 overs)		Jehan Mubarak 44* (70); Ryan Sidebottom 2/23 (10 overs)

England won by 65 runs
Rangiri Dambulla International Stadium, Dambulla, Sri Lanka
Umpires: Rudi Koertzen (RSA) and Tyron Wijewardene (SRI)
Player of the match: Owais Shah (ENG)

Despite England's heavy defeat in the previous match their team remained unchanged while Sri Lanka also carried the same squad. England won the toss and elected to bat. Sri Lanka started in similar vein to the previous game and had England on 61/4. Collingwood and Owais Shah began the England recovery putting on 78 runs before Collingwood was out lbw. A stand of 70 between Swann and Shah followed allowing England to finish on 234/8.

Ryan Sidebottom and Stuart Broad disciplined bowling yielded four early wickets putting Sri Lanka on 38/4 after 14.1 overs. Jayawardene and Tillakaratne Dilshan started a recovery but after both their wickets fell within nine deliveries of each other the game was largely in England's control. From then on wickets fell at regular intervals and although Dilhara Fernando and Farveez Maharoof added 43 runs for the final wicket it was too much to ask for the final pair to win the match.

Shah was awarded man of the match with his score of 82 and was largely responsible for England setting a decent score of 234/8. This was the first win for England in Sri Lanka since 1982 while Shah's score of 82 was the highest ever for an Englishman in Sri Lanka. Winning captain Collingwood said he was delighted with his team's performance but wanted this match to be the benchmark for the rest of the series.

=== 3rd ODI ===
7 October (D/N)
(scorecard)

Sri Lanka; 164 (41.1 overs)	v	England; 164/8 (46.5 overs)
Tillakaratne Dilshan 70 (84); Graeme Swann 4/34 (10 overs)		Paul Collingwood 32 (71); Farveez Maharoof 3/34 (10 overs)

England won by 2 wickets (D/L)
Rangiri Dambulla International Stadium, Dambulla, Sri Lanka
Umpires: Asoka de Silva (SRI) and Rudi Koertzen (RSA)
Player of the match: Graeme Swann (ENG)

- Match shortened to 48 overs a side.

=== 4th ODI ===
10 October (D/N)
(scorecard)

Sri Lanka; 211/9 (50 overs)	v	England; 212/5 (46.5 overs)
Kumar Sangakkara 69 (102); Ryan Sidebottom 3/27 (10 overs)		Alastair Cook 80 (123); Dilhara Fernando 2/38 (10 overs)

England won by 5 wickets
R. Premadasa Stadium, Khettarama, Colombo, Sri Lanka
Umpires: Rudi Koertzen (RSA) & Tyron Wijewardene (SRI)
Player of the match: Alastair Cook (ENG)

=== 5th ODI ===
13 October (D/N)
(scorecard)

Sri Lanka; 211 (48.1 overs)	v	England; 104 (21.4 overs)
Chamara Silva 73 (109); Stuart Broad 3/36 (9.1 overs)		Kevin Pietersen 28 (45); Dilhara Fernando 6/27 (8 overs)

Sri Lanka won by 107 runs
R. Premadasa Stadium, Khettarama, Colombo, Sri Lanka
Umpires: Asoka de Silva (SRI) and Rudi Koertzen (RSA)
Player of the match: Dilhara Fernando (SRI)

== Tour matches ==
=== English v Sri Lanka Cricket Board President's XI ===
20 – 22 November
Scorecard

Sri Lanka Cricket Board President's XI	v	England
500/5 dec (131 overs); Chamara Kapugedera 141 (233); Stuart Broad 1/42 (17 overs)		315/6 (89 overs); Alastair Cook 63 (87); Nuwan Kulasekara 1/28 (11 overs)

Match drawn
Colombo Cricket Club Ground, Colombo, Sri Lanka
Umpires: Grashan Liyanage & Jagath Nandakumar

After two tame days of bowling from the England squad which saw the president's XI reach an impressive 500 for 5, England took to the wicket for one day in this warm up match. The team started off well, an opening stand of 77 before Michael Vaughan, back up the order as an opener, was trapped LBW by Malinga Bandara. As top-scorer Alastair Cook reached his fifty, with seven fours, the rest of his teammates were investigating rumoured sittings of a snake underneath the advertising board. Only Kevin Pietersen fell cheaply, for 4, while the other top-order batsmen all retired after making semi-impressive starts to ensure as many batsmen could have a knock but the match was over as any kind of contest due to the poor performance of the 9 bowlers used.

=== English v Sri Lanka Cricket Board President's XI – First-class match ===
25 – 27 November
Scorecard

Sri Lanka Cricket Board President's XI	v	England
298/9 dec (81 overs); Upul Tharanga 86 (102); Matthew Hoggard 3/57 (17)		134 (50.2 overs); Ravi Bopara 47 (93); Sujeewa de Silva 4/41 (10)
81 (30 overs); Mahela Udawatte 45 (83); Matthew Hoggard 5/25 (9)		247/5 (61 overs); Kevin Pietersen 59 (86); Jehan Mubarak 3/57 (15)

England by 5 wickets
Colts Cricket Club Ground, Colombo, Sri Lanka
Umpires: Ranmor Martinesz & Atula Senanayake

== Test series ==
=== 1st Test ===
1–5 December 2007
scorecard

Sri Lanka	v	England
188 (59.4 overs); KC Sangakkara 92 (159); MJ Hoggard 4/29 (14.0)		281 (93.1 overs); IR Bell 83 (125); M Muralitharan 6/55 (35.0)
442/8 dec (130.0 overs); KC Sangakkara 152 (269); MS Panesar 3/132 (45.0)		261 (94.0 overs); IR Bell 74 (209); WPUJC Vaas 3/56 (17.0)

Sri Lanka won by 88 runs
Asgiriya Stadium, Kandy, Sri Lanka
Umpires: Aleem Dar (PAK) and Asad Rauf (PAK)
Player of the match: KC Sangakkara

- Bad light ended day 1 early, and rain ended day 2 early.
- Chaminda Vaas (SL) played in his 100th Test.
- On Day 3 of this Test, Muttiah Muralitharan surpassed Shane Warne as the leading wicket-taker in Test cricket. At the end of the Kandy Test, Murali's wicket total stood at 713 to Warne's 708.
- On the same day that Murali set the Test wickets record, Sri Lanka's Sanath Jayasuriya became only the second batsman to score six fours off a six-ball over in Test cricket. After the day's proceedings, he announced his retirement from Test cricket, effective at the end of the Kandy Test. He will continue to play in ODIs.
- In Sri Lanka's second innings, Kumar Sangakkara became the first batsman ever to score 150 in each of four consecutive Tests.

The first day of the tour was a dramatic one, and it ended up being England's most impressive one of the whole tour. Sri Lanka, having won the toss and chose to bat first, were reduced to 42/5 due to some highly impressive swing bowling by Matthew Hoggard. A 100 run partnership between Kumar Sangakkara (who top-scored with 92) and Prasanna Jayawardene (the keeper) followed to allow Sri Lanka to post a vaguely respectable score, but they were bowled out for 188. England made a confident reply, reaching 49/1 by the close of play, with the loss of Alastair Cook in the first over as the only blemish.

England's innings proceeded well through the morning of day 2, with Ian Bell posting a fluent 83 before chipping a shot to midwicket. However, England then suffered a mini collapse, triggered by Muttiah Muralitharan, and slipped to 185/6 before rain curtailed the day's play. By this point, all eyes were on Muralitharan who was on the verge of overtaking Shane Warne's career haul of 708 test wickets.

England resumed positively on day 3, with Ryan Sidebottom providing useful assistance to the remaining recognised batsman, Paul Collingwood. However, it would be Collingwood who eventually provided Muralitharan with his record-breaking dismissal, being clean bowled by the spinner. The wicket prompted scenes of mass celebration, and an ad-hoc presentation along with the awarding of a special trophy by senior Sri Lankan officials took place at the lunch break. Michael Vaughan attended this ceremony.

Alongside all this, England were bowled out for 281, and took a useful 93 run lead into the second innings. However, the strength of this position quickly evaporated as Sri Lanka made a very good start to their second innings, with the openers (Sanath Jayasuriya and Michael Vandort) putting on 113. During this opening stand, Jayasuriya became only the second batsman to score six fours off a six-ball over in Test cricket (with James Anderson being the unfortunate bowler). After the day's proceedings, he announced his retirement from Test cricket.

Sri Lanka continued with a far more assertive batting display in their second innings. Mahela Jayawardene and Kumar Sangakkara dominated the first session, and Sangakkara became the first batsman ever to score 150 in each of four consecutive Tests. England's bowlers toiled throughout the day but struggled to contain the Sri Lankan batsman. Sri Lanka declared near to the close of play on 442/8, shortly after a swarm of bees had forced a halt in play with players and umpires all diving for cover!

England lost Alastair Cook in the first over again, and needed to bat the final day out (or score an unlikely 350 to win). The biggest threat was clearly Muralitharan, and so it was therefore of some disappointment that the 4 wickets to fall during the morning session on the final day were to the seam bowlers. At 125/5 at lunch, their quest seemed doomed, but Ian Bell and Matt Prior batted for 45 overs through the tea break and beyond to give England a chance of a draw.

However, Muralitharan had the last word when he dismissed both these well-set batsmen within an over of each other. Shortly afterwards, Ryan Sidebottom was dismissed to a controversial lbw decision (replays showed a big inside edge onto pad) which ended the stiffest of the resistance the lower order could offer. Matthew Hoggard was clean bowled by a Lasith Malinga yorker a few overs later, and Sri Lanka had won the match by 88 runs.

=== 2nd Test ===
9–13 December 2007
scorecard

England	v	Sri Lanka
351 (126.2 overs); MP Vaughan 87 (139); M Muralitharan 5/116 (47.2)		548/9 dec (186.5 overs); DPMD Jayawardene 195 (422); RJ Sidebottom 3/100 (36.0)
250/3 (77 overs); AN Cook 62 (124); CRD Fernando 1/30 (10.0)

Match drawn
Sinhalese Sports Club Ground, Colombo, Sri Lanka
Umpires: Aleem Dar (PAK) and DJ Harper (AUS)
Player of the match: DPMD Jayawardene

- Rain ends play at tea on day 5

Following the defeat in Kandy, England made two changes to their side. One was an enforced change, Matthew Hoggard having suffered an injury during the second innings. James Anderson was the other man to give way, with Stephen Harmison and Stuart Broad coming in. It was Broad's debut.

Sri Lanka's only change was enforced by Sanath Jayasuriya's retirement – Upul Tharanga replacing him at the top of the order. Jayasuriya was present at the Test match – but in the form of a TV commentator!

England won the toss, chose to bat and made an impressive start to their innings, with the opening stand being worth 133 in 39 overs. Michael Vaughan played some exquisite shots, bringing back memories of his performances against India and Australia in 2002 when he reached the top of the world rankings. It took a freakish dismissal to remove him, the ball getting caught in the trousers of the short leg fielder who then managed to grab it before it hit the ground. Vaughan had made 87, and was very disappointed to have to leave the crease when he had the potential to make a very large score.

Unusual dismissals were to be the theme of the day. Kevin Pietersen was given out to a catch that did not appear to have carried, and Alastair Cook fell victim to a questionable lbw decision. Ravi Bopara was clean bowled by Lasith Malinga next ball, and England closed the day on 258/5 – which was disappointing given the promising start.

England suffered further losses early on day 2, with Paul Collingwood shouldering arms to a straight delivery, and Stuart Broad failing as a batsman on his debut. Matt Prior batted very well for 79, and only fell when trying to accelerate the scoring with 9 wickets down. Before this, Ryan Sidebottom had provided him with good assistance with a partnership worth 74. England were all out for 351 – a somewhat below par total, but something to work with for the bowlers.

The bowlers made a very good start in the Sri Lankan reply, with Sidebottom removing Tharanga and then the prize wicket of Kumar Sangakkara very cheaply. The score was 22/2 at this point. Stuart Broad had shared the new ball with Sidebottom and bowled impressively, although he did receive two warnings for running on the danger area of the pitch.

However, this was as good as it got for England, as the Sri Lankan skipper, along with Michael Vandort proceeded to build a big partnership for the third wicket. They ended day 2 on 105/2, and carried on well into the afternoon session of day 3, and both picked up centuries in the process. Mahela Jayawardene also passed 7,000 test runs in his innings, the first Sri Lankan to achieve this milestone.

England toiled hard for just 2 wickets on day 3, those of Vandort and Chamara Silva, and the score was 379/4 at the end of the day. Stephen Harmison bowled very well following his comeback from injury, and deserved more success than the one wicket (of Silva) he got.

On day 4, England managed to make further inroads into Sri Lanka's innings, but the lead was ballooning out of control. A 98-run partnership for the ninth wicket effectively killed their chance of winning the test. When Sri Lanka finally declared on 548/9, they led by 197 runs and with one day's play remaining; the only possible results were a Sri Lankan win or a draw.

England's openers again posted a century partnership, the first time an English opening pair had done so for over 35 years. Michael Vaughan, Ian Bell and Alastair Cook all posted fifties to get up to parity with Sri Lanka and then take the lead. By tea, they had reached 250/3, but play was then brought to a halt due to rain, and the Test match drawn.

Mahela Jayawardene said after the match that he felt England's approach had been too negative, and they had eliminated their chances of winning by scoring too slowly in the first innings. He would go on to make similar comments at the end of the series.

=== 3rd Test ===
18–22 December 2007
scorecard

Sri Lanka	v	England
499/8 dec (148.5 overs); DPMD Jayawardene 213* (411); SJ Harmison 3/104 (34.0)		81 (30.5 overs); PD Collingwood 29 (48); WPUJC Vaas 4/28 (9.5)
		251/6 (95 overs); AN Cook 118 (285); M Muralitharan 3/91 (38.0)

Match drawn
Galle International Stadium, Galle, Sri Lanka
Umpires: Asad Rauf (PAK) and DJ Harper (AUS)
Player of the match: DPMD Jayawardene

- Days 1 and 2 both started late due to rain, rain also interrupted days 4 and 5

The final test of the series was a poignant and emotional affair – it was the first Test match to take place at the Galle stadium since it had been destroyed by the tsunami three years prior. The teams of ground staff had worked tirelessly on getting the stadium ready for the match, and heavy rainfall a few days before did not stop them achieving this memorable feat. Following the match, both the teams and all the officials were quick to congratulate them on their fantastic work that allowed the match to go ahead.

Sri Lanka made two change – swapping out the underperforming Jehan Mubarak for Tillakaratne Dilshan, a three-dimensional player who many believe should never have been dropped from the side. His good batting record, useful bowling ability and world class fielding is nearly always an asset to Sri Lanka when he is on the team. The other change was to swap the injured Dilhara Fernando for a debutant, Chanaka Welegedara.

England brought Matthew Hoggard back into the side, at the expense of Stuart Broad, despite an impressive debut in extremely difficult bowling conditions.

England won the toss and chose to field – a decision which looked correct as the new ball bowlers found plenty of movement of the pitch. However, they failed to take advantage of this situation, and the two wickets earned during the first session of play were due to lbw decisions that the batsmen could consider themselves unlucky to get out to. The biggest wicket of the day for England was that of Kumar Sangakkara, who pulled a ball out to deep square leg into the waiting hands of Monty Panesar. He had scored 46, but looked set for a much larger score. At the end of the day's play, Sri Lanka were 147/4, but with Mahela Jayawardene still at the crease.

Day 2 was a long and frustrating one for England, who were only able to take two wickets. Jayawardene and the recalled Dilshan batted for almost two sessions, before Dilshan was run out for 84 trying to give his captain the single that would earn him his century. England's only positive moment of the day occurring during the same over, where Ravi Bopara picked up his first test wicket when Prasanna Jayawardene edged the ball through to the keeper. Chaminda Vaas joined his captain at the crease and the two of them put on an unbroken 97, to take the score to 384/6.

Any hopes England had of winning the test and squaring the series were eliminated on day 3. Jayawardene went on to score 213 not out, Vaas had scored 90 before being dismissed, and Sri Lanka declared on 499/8. But things then turned from bad to catastrophic for England, as they lost 4 wickets during a 20-minute passage of play before lunch. Two wickets then fell quickly after lunch too to leave England on 33/6. Ryan Sidebottom and Paul Collingwood managed a partnership of 37 before the lower order were blown away. England were bowled out for the pitiful total of 81.

Chaminda Vaas was the stand out bowler for Sri Lanka, taking 4 wickets, and Chanaka Welegedara took his first two test wickets, including that of Paul Collingwood which prevented England getting past 100.

England received high levels of criticism for their first innings batting performance. Bob Willis, talking on Sky Sports' highlights show described it as "an absolute disgrace". Much debate was raised through a variety of media, calling factors into question such as the length of the tour (too short for three tests), the proximity to Christmas and the longer-term argument about the volume of cricket that teams have to play. Several of the fringe players came under scrutiny, too.

Having surrendered a first innings deficit of 416, England now had to bat for two days to save the game. They were able to do this with considerable assistance from the weather, which ensured that half the remaining available match time was wiped out. By the time the game was determined a draw late on day 5, England had reached 251/6 – a marked improvement on the first innings. Alastair Cook had scored 118, recording England's first and solitary century on the tour. Sri Lanka, in contrast, had scored 4. England suffered a scare when 3 wickets fell in four balls, including a first ball run out for Ravi Bopara, but they managed to avoid a defeat – which many felt they should not have. This was in contrast to the first match in Kandy, when they did deserve to escape with a draw, but did not.

Series result: a 1–0 win to Sri Lanka. Mahela Jayawardene raised points similar to what he said after the Colombo test, saying England's approach was too negative. Whilst his criticism was perhaps unjustified in the second test, it certainly was not here. England did appear to have given up during day 2, and this possibly acted as a catalyst for the poor batting performance that followed.

England left Sri Lanka with concerns about some of their best players. Monty Panesar and Kevin Pietersen in particular had not enjoyed a good series, and many of the other players enjoyed good starts but were unable to maintain their consistency levels.

Sri Lanka on the other hand were much happier. Their side had climbed to 3rd place in the ICC Test Match rankings, with England slipping from 2nd to 5th. Their two best batsmen were in imperious form, their newer players were improving by the game and their bowling attack was delivering as a unit. At the end of the series, the world's top ranked test batsman and bowler were both Sri Lankan: Sangakkara and Muralitharan, respectively.
