= 2007–08 SLC Super Provincial Twenty20 =

Cricket tournament season

- Administrator: Sri Lanka Cricket
- Cricket format: Twenty20
- Tournament format(s): Round-robin and Knockout
- Host: Sri Lanka
- Champions: Wayamba Elevens (1st title)
- Runners-up: Ruhuna Elevens
- Participants: 6
- Matches: 18
- Player of the series: Chinthaka Jayasinghe (KXI)
- Most runs: Jeevantha Kulatunga (WXI) (182)
- Most wickets: Sujeewa de Silva (RXI) (13)
- Official website: Cricinfo site

The 2007–08 SLC Super Provincial Twenty20 is the 1st season of the official Twenty20 domestic cricket competition in Sri Lanka. Six teams in total, five representing four provinces of Sri Lanka and a Sri Lanka Schools XI team participating in the competition. The competition began on 17 April 2008, when Basnahira North elevens played the Wayamba elevens at Colts Cricket Club Ground, Colombo.

This season comprised 15 regular matches, two semi finals and a grand final.

== Teams ==
Team name (Sponsored name)	Home ground(s)	Captain
Basnahira North elevens Western Province North	R. Premadasa Stadium	Thilina Kandamby
Basnahira South elevens Western Province South	Sinhalese Sports Club Ground	Prasanna Jayawardene
Kandurata elevens Central Province	Pallekele International Cricket Stadium	Kaushalya Weeraratne
Ruhuna elevens Southern Province	Galle International Stadium	Indika de Saram
Sri Lanka Schools XI; Sri Lankan Schools		Dinesh Chandimal
Wayamba elevens North Western Province	Welagedara Stadium	Jehan Mubarak

== Rules and regulations ==
Points
Results	Points
Win	4 points
Tie	2 points
No Result _{(but play started)}	2 point
Loss	0 points

Teams received 4 points for a win, 2 for a tie or no result, and 0 for a loss. At the end of the regular matches the teams ranked two and three play each other in the preliminary final. The winner of the preliminary final earns the right to play the first placed team in the final at the home venue of the first placed team. In the event of several teams finishing with the same number of points, standings are determined by most wins, then net run rate (NRR). All finals were played at Welagedara Stadium.

== Standings and tournament progression ==
=== Standings ===
Team	Pld	W	T	L	NR	BP	Pts	NRR
Ruhuna elevens (R)	5	4	0	1	1	3	19	+3.904
Wayamba elevens (C)	5	4	0	1	0	2	17	−0.316
Basnahira North elevens	5	3	0	2	1	0	12	+0.066
Kandurata elevens	5	2	0	3	0	1	9	+0.749
Basnahira South elevens	5	1	0	4	0	0	4	−1.168
Sri Lanka Schools XI	5	1	0	4	0	0	4	−1.627

Full table on cricinfo
(C) = Eventual Champion; (R) = Runner-up.

=== Tournament progression ===
	Group Matches					Knockout				
Team	1	2	3	4	5	SF	F			
Basnahira North	0	4	8	8	12	L				
Basnahira South	0	0	0	0	4					
Kandurata	0	5	5	9	9	L				
Ruhuna	4	9	14	19	19	W	L			
Sri Lanka Schools XI	4	4	4	4	4					
Wayamba	4	4	8	12	16	W	W			
Note: The total points at the end of each group match are listed.								Win	Loss	No result
Note: Click on the points (group matches)or W/L (Knockout) to see the summary for the match.								Team was eliminated before the league reached this stage.		

== Fixtures ==
=== Round 1 ===
17 April 2008
Scorecard

Basnahira North; 158/9 (20 overs)	v	Wayamba elevens 160/5 (19.1 overs)
Thilina Kandamby 33 (17); Shanuka Dissanayake 1/28 (4 overs)		Damitha Hunukumbura 87 (54); Chanaka Welegedara 2/21 (4 overs)

Wayamba won by 5 wickets
Colts Cricket Club Ground
Umpires: Asoka De Silva and Grashan Liyanage

- Wayamba, who chose to field
- Amal Athulathmudali (Basnahira North) and Thisara Perera (Wayamba) both made their T20 debuts.

17 April 2008
Scorecard

Sri Lanka Schools XI; 152/7 (20 overs)	v	Basnahira South elevens 139 (19 overs)
Tharindu Thushan 55 (45); Vinodh Perera 3/29 (4 overs)		Anushka Polonowita 54* (27); Dilruwan Perera 2/22 (4 overs)

Schools Invitation XI won by 13 runs
Burgher Recreation Club Ground
Umpires: Jagath Nandakumar and Gamini Silva

- Basnahira South, who chose to field
- Tharaka Kottehewa (Basnahira South); Dinesh Chandimal, Chaturanga de Silva, Charith Jayampathi, Nipun Karunanayake, Navin Kavikara, Chathura Peiris, Angelo Perera, Kusal Perera, Vinodh Perera and Imesh Udayanga (Schools Invitation XI) all made their T20 debuts.

17 April 2008
Scorecard

Kandurata elevens 172/8 (20 overs)	v	Ruhuna elevens 57/3 (6 overs)
Jeewan Mendis 47 (38); Chaminda Vidanapathirana 2/22 (2 overs)		Yohan de Silva 18* (17); Sujeewa de Silva 4/32 (4 overs)

Ruhuna won by 1 run (D/L method)
Colts Cricket Club Ground
Umpires: Asoka De Silva and Nalin Withana

- Kandurata, who chose to bat
- Sachith Pathirana (Kandurata) and Ashan Priyanjan (Ruhuna) both made their T20 debuts.

=== Round 2 ===
18 April 2008
Scorecard

Sri Lanka Schools XI; 134/6 (20 overs)	v	Kandurata elevens 137/5 (14.5 overs)
Angelo Perera 32 (19); Nadun Pathirana 2/19 (3 overs)		Thilan Samaraweera 70 (38); Akalanka Ganegama 2/12 (4 overs)

Kandurata won by 5 wickets
Moors Sports Club Ground
Umpires: Gamini Dissanayake and Grashan Liyanage

- Kandurata, who chose to field
- Nadun Pathirana (Schools Invitation XI) made his T20 debut.

18 April 2008
Scorecard

Wayamba elevens 69 (16.1 overs)	v	Ruhuna elevens 70/2 (10 overs)
Suresh Perera 14 (14); Thissara Perera 2/35 (4 overs)		Dilhara Lokuhettige 18 (11); Sujeewa de Silva 3/9 (4 overs)

Ruhuna won by 8 wickets
Colts Cricket Club Ground
Umpires: Deepal Gunawardene and Tyron Wijewardene

- Ruhuna, who chose to field

18 April 2008
Scorecard

Basnahira South elevens 134 (19.3 overs)	v	Basnahira North elevens 136/4 (18.5 overs)
Hemantha Wickramaratne 33 (25); Malinda Warnapura 3/19 (4 overs)		Amal Athulathmudali 32 (26); Malintha Gajanayake 2/4 (1 over)

Basnahira North won by 6 wickets
Colts Cricket Club Ground
Umpires: Sagara Gallage and Tyron Wijewardene

- Basnahira South, who chose to bat

=== Round 3 ===
21 April 2008
Scorecard

Basnahira North elevens 117 (19.4 overs)	v	Sri Lanka Schools XI; 103 (18.2 overs)
Muthumudalige Pushpakumara 26 (26); Shanuka Dissanayake 3/17 (4 overs)		Tharindu Thushan 36 (29); Udara Jayasundera 3/14 (2.4 overs)

Basnahira North won by 14 runs
Burgher Recreation Club Ground
Umpires: Atula Senanayake and Gamini Silva

- Basnahira North, who chose to bat

21 April 2008
Scorecard

Wayamba elevens 127 (18.4 overs)	v	Kandurata elevens 124/8 (20 overs)
Asela Jayasinghe 41 (27); Chanaka Welegedara 3/18 (4 overs)		Chinthaka Jayasinghe 33 (30); Akalanka Ganegama 4/13 (2.4 overs)

Wayamba won by 3 runs
Colts Cricket Club Ground
Umpires: Asoka De Silva and Nalin Withana

- Kandurata, who chose to field

21 April 2008
Scorecard

Basnahira South elevens 109 (18.3 overs)	v	Ruhuna elevens 111/3 (11.2 overs)
Hemantha Wickramaratne 30 (29); Dilruwan Perera 1/6 (3 overs)		Upul Tharanga 68* (36); Sachithra Senanayake 3/16 (4 overs)

Ruhuna won by 7 wickets
Colts Cricket Club Ground
Umpires: Asoka De Silva and Nalin Withana

- Basnahira South, who chose to bat

=== Round 4 ===
23 April 2008
Scorecard

Basnahira South elevens 118/9 (20 overs)	v	Wayamba elevens 119/9 (19.4 overs)
Hemantha Wickramaratne 28 (26); Milinda Siriwardana 4/22 (4 overs)		Jeevantha Kulatunga 48* (35); Shalika Karunanayake 3/20 (4 overs)

Wayamba won by 1 wicket
Colts Cricket Club Ground
Umpires: Sagara Gallage and Tyron Wijewardene

- Wayamba, who chose to field

23 April 2008
Scorecard

Sri Lanka Schools XI; 126 (19.2 overs)	v	Ruhuna elevens 127/2 (11.4 overs)
Kushal Janith Perera 56 (46); Chathura Peiris 1/23 (3 overs)		Indika de Saram 43* (13); Sachithra Senanayake 2/16 (4 overs)

Ruhuna won by 8 wickets
Burgher Recreation Club Ground
Umpires: Gamini Dissanayake and Jagath Nandakumar

- Ruhuna, who chose to field

23 April 2008
Scorecard

Basnahira North elevens 122/9 (20 overs)	v	Kandurata elevens 123/7 (18.3 overs)
Kaushal Silva 60* (51); Muthumudalige Pushpakumara 2/8 (3.3 overs)		Thilan Samaraweera 46 (39); Sachith Pathirana 3/16 (4 overs)

Kandurata won by 3 wickets
Colts Cricket Club Ground
Umpires: Sagara Gallage and Deepal Gunawardene

- Basnahira North, who chose to bat

=== Round 5 ===
24 April 2008
Scorecard

Kandurata elevens 200/7 (20 overs)	v	Basnahira South elevens 33/0 (3 overs)
Chamara Kapugedera 67 (33); Thilan Thushara 0/10 (1 over)		Dilruwan Perera 15* (9); Nandika Ranjith 2/33 (4 overs)

No result (Basnahira South won the bowl-out)
Burgher Recreation Club Ground
Umpires: Atula Senanayake and Gamini Silva

- Basnahira South, who chose to field

24 April 2008
Scorecard

Sri Lanka Schools XI; 141/9 (20 overs)	v	Wayamba elevens 68/1 (6.3 overs)
Angelo Perera 47 (33); Imesh Udayanga 1/8 (2 overs)		Mahela Udawatte 33 (17); Rangana Herath 3/20 (4 overs)

Wayamba won by 27 runs (D/L method)
Colts Cricket Club Ground
Umpires: Grashan Liyanage and Jagath Nandakumar

- Wayamba, who chose to field

24 April 2008
Scorecard

Basnahira North elevens	v	Ruhuna elevens

Basnahira North won the bowl-out 3–1
Colts Cricket Club Ground
Umpires: Tyron Wijewardene and Nalin Withana

- No toss
- Match abandoned without a ball bowled

== Knockout stage ==
Semi-finals
29 April – Welagedara Stadium
Wayamba	125/8 (20 overs)
Kandurata	118/9 (20 overs)
30 April – Welagedara Stadium
Basnahira North	113/9 (20 overs)
Ruhuna	116/5 (15.3 overs)

Final
1 May – Welagedara Stadium
Wayamba	174/9 (20 overs)
Ruhuna	143 (19.1 overs)

=== Semi Final 1 ===
30 April 2008
Scorecard

Wayamba; 125/8 (20 overs)	v	Kandurata; 118/9 (20 overs)
Jehan Mubarak 31 (31); Jeevantha Kulatunga 27 (19); Rangana Herath 2/15 (3 overs); Thissara Perera 2/25 (4 overs)		Kanchana Gunawardene 31 (34); Chamara Kapugedera 27 (20); Chinthaka Jayasinghe 4/17 (4 overs); Thilan Thushara 3/25 (4 overs)

Wayamba won by 7 runs
Welagedara Stadium
Umpires: Asoka De Silva and Nalin Withana

- Kandurata, who chose to field

=== Semi Final 2 ===
30 April 2008
Scorecard

Basnahira North; 113/9 (20 overs)	v	Ruhuna; 116/5 (15.3 overs)
Dhushantha Ranatunga 33 (34); Thilina Kandamby 30 (30); Thilina Kandamby 3/21 (3.3 overs); Muthumudalige Pushpakumara 2/16 (3 overs)		Dilhara Lokuhettige 53 (36); Indika de Saram 34 (23); Sujeewa de Silva 3/16 (4 overs); Sajeewa Weerakoon 3/20 (4 overs)

Ruhuna won by 5 wickets
Welagedara Stadium
Umpires: Sagara Gallage and Gamini Silva

- Ruhuna, who chose to field

=== Final ===
1 May 2008
Scorecard

Wayamba; 174/9 (20 overs)	v	Ruhuna; 143 (19.1 overs)
Jeevantha Kulatunga 78 (45); Asela Jayasinghe 27 (24); Thissara Perera 3/34 (4 overs); Rangana Herath 2/23 (3.1 overs)		Gihan De Silva 36 (18); Indika de Saram 18 (10); Kosala Kulasekara 3/29 (4 overs); Dilhara Lokuhettige 1/28 (4 overs)

Wayamba won by 31 runs
Welagedara Stadium
Umpires: Asoka De Silva and Nalin Withana
Player of the match: Jeevantha Kulatunga

- Ruhuna, who chose to field

== Statistics ==
=== Most Runs ===
The top five highest run scorers (total runs) in the season are included in this table.

Player	Team	Runs	Inns	Avg	S/R	HS	100s	50s
Jeevantha Kulatunga	Wayamba elevens	182	6	36.40	142.18	78	0	1
Thilan Samaraweera	Kandurata elevens	157	6	26.16	133.05	70	0	1
Jeewan Mendis	Kandurata elevens	152	6	30.40	121.60	48	0	0
Dilhara Lokuhettige	Ruhuna elevens	147	6	24.50	151.54	53	0	1
Angelo Perera	Sri Lanka Schools XI	132	5	26.40	126.92	47	0	0

Last Updated 3 April 2010.

=== Most Wickets ===
The following table contains the five leading wicket-takers of the season.

Player	Team	Wkts	Mts	Ave	S/R	Econ	BBI
Sujeewa de Silva	Ruhuna elevens	13	6	10.61	10.8	5.87	4/32
Thissara Perera	Wayamba elevens	11	7	16.81	13.0	7.70	3/30
Rangana Herath	Wayamba elevens	9	7	12.77	15.4	4.96	3/20
Sajeewa Weerakoon	Ruhuna elevens	9	6	13.55	14.6	5.54	3/20
Kosala Kulasekara	Ruhuna elevens	9	6	15.11	15.3	5.91	3/29

Last Updated 3 April 2010.

=== Highest Team Totals ===
The following table lists the six highest team scores during this season.

Team	Total	Opponent	Ground
Kandurata elevens	200/7	Basnahira South elevens	Burgher
Wayamba elevens	174/9	Ruhuna elevens	Kurunegala
Kandurata elevens	172/8	Ruhuna elevens	Colts
Wayamba elevens	160/5	Basnahira North elevens	Colts
Basnahira North elevens	158/9	Wayamba elevens	Colts
Sri Lanka Schools XI	152/7	Basnahira South elevens	Burgher

Last Updated 3 April 2010.

=== Highest Scores ===
This table contains the top five highest scores of the season made by a batsman in a single innings.

Player	Team	Score	Balls	4s	6s	Opponent	Ground
Damitha Hunukumbura	Wayamba elevens	87	54	14	1	Basnahira North elevens	Colts
Jeevantha Kulatunga	Wayamba elevens	78	45	5	5	Ruhuna elevens	Kurunegala
Thilan Samaraweera	Kandurata elevens	70	38	7	3	Sri Lanka Schools XI	Moors
Upul Tharanga	Ruhuna elevens	68*	36	6	6	Basnahira South elevens	Colts
Chamara Kapugedera	Kandurata elevens	67	33	5	5	Basnahira South elevens	Burgher

Last Updated 3 April 2010.

=== Best Bowling Figures in an innings ===
This table lists the top five players with the best bowling figures in an innings.

Player	Team	Overs	Figures	Opponent	Ground
Akalanka Ganegama	Kandurata elevens	2.4	4/13	Wayamba elevens	Colts
Chinthaka Jayasinghe	Kandurata elevens	4.0	4/17	Wayamba elevens	Kurunegala
Milinda Siriwardana	Basnahira South elevens	4.0	4/22	Wayamba elevens	Colts
Sujeewa de Silva	Ruhuna elevens	4.0	4/32	Kandurata elevens	Colts
Sujeewa de Silva	Ruhuna elevens	4.0	3/9	Wayamba elevens	Colts

Last Updated 3 April 2010.
