= Marylebone Cricket Club in Bangladesh in 1999–2000 =

Marylebone Cricket Club (MCC) toured Bangladesh in January 2000 for a three-week tour and played five matches including one first-class against the Bangladesh national team which was elevated to Test status later in the year, having been granted full membership of the International Cricket Conference (the ICC). The first-class match was drawn. MCC were captained by Min Patel and Bangladesh by Aminul Islam.

== Matches ==
=== Match 1 ===
14-16 January 2000
Scorecard

| BCB XI; 188 (66.5 overs) & 124/4 (54 overs) | v | Marylebone; 250 (110.4 overs) |
| Habibul Bashar 45; Enamul Haque 4/61 | | Robin Weston 73; Adrian Rollins 3/20 |

Match drawn
Rajshahi Divisional Stadium, Rajshahi
Umpires: Jahangir Talukdar and Tariqul Islam

=== Match 2 ===
18-22 January 2000
Scorecard

| Dhaka Metro; 289 (92.5 overs) & 220/3d (71 overs) | v | Marylebone; 217 (94.2 overs) & 133/4 (48 overs) |
| Javed Omar 88; Hasibul Hossain 3/43 | | Darren Bicknell 58; Sajeeb Das 4/51 |

Match drawn
National Stadium, Dhaka
Umpires: Muzahiduzzaman and Sailab Hossain

=== Match 3 ===
23 January 2000
Scorecard

| BCB XI; 180 (40 overs) | v | Marylebone; 184 (39.1 overs) |
| Habibul Bashar 44; Naimur Rahman 3/44 | | Robin Weston 43; Adrian Rollins 4/40 |

Match drawn
Shamsul Huda Stadium, Jessore
Umpires: Gazi Ashraf and Mesbahuddin Ahmed

=== Match 4 ===
25-27 January 2000
Scorecard

| Bangladesh; 172 (49.5 overs) | v | Marylebone Cricket Club; 175/3 (43.4 overs) |
| Akram Khan 44 (84); Hasibul Hossain 1/28 (9 overs) | | Darren Bicknell 71* (121); Adrian Rollins 3/28 (10 overs) |

Marylebone Cricket Club won by 7 wickets
National Stadium, Dhaka
Umpires: Aziz Ahmed and Showkatur Rahman

=== Match 5 ===
29 January 2000
Scorecard

| Bangladesh; 191/9 (50 overs) | v | Marylebone; 192/3 (42.1 overs) |
| Al Sahariar 52 (74); Mohammad Rafique 1/33 (10 overs) | | Robin Weston 90* (118); Sajeeb Das 3/33 (10 overs) |

Marylebone Cricket Club won by 7 wickets
National Stadium, Dhaka
Umpires: Mesbahuddin Ahmed and Sailab Hossain

== Venues ==
| Rajshahi | Dhaka | Jessore |
|---|---|---|
| Rajshahi Divisional Stadium | National Stadium | Shamsul Huda Stadium |
| Capacity: 15,000 | Capacity: 36,000 | Capacity: 12,000 |
Marylebone Cricket Club in Bangladesh in 1999–2000 is located in Bangladesh
