= Sri Lankan cricket team in England in 2006 =

Sri Lanka in England 2006
	Sri Lanka	England
- Dates: 24 April – 1 July 2006
Captains	Mahela Jayawardene	Andrew Flintoff

Test series
- Result: 3-match series drawn 1–1
Most runs	Kumar Sangakkara (231)	Kevin Pietersen (360)
Most wickets	Muttiah Muralitharan (24)	Matthew Hoggard (15)
- Player of the series: Muttiah Muralitharan (SL) and Kevin Pietersen (Eng)

One Day International series
- Results: Sri Lanka won the 5-match series 5–0
Most runs	Upul Tharanga (347)	Marcus Trescothick (277)
Most wickets	Lasith Malinga (13)	Steve Harmison (8)
- Player of the series: Sanath Jayasuriya (SL)

Twenty20 International series
- Results: Sri Lanka won the 1-match series 1–0
Most runs	Sanath Jayasuriya (41)	Marcus Trescothick (72)
Most wickets	Sanath Jayasuriya (2)	Paul Collingwood (4)
- Player of the series: Sanath Jayasuriya (SL)

The Sri Lanka cricket team toured England during the 2006 international cricket season. England were back home for the first time since September 2005 and looked to maintain their Test standards, which saw them keep their second place in the ICC Test Championship in India, and the teams were also competing for sixth place in the ICC ODI Championship as both England and Sri Lanka were coming off the back of two lost ODI tours on the Asian sub-continent, against India and Pakistan, respectively. To add to problems, both teams were likely to be missing some key members of the team as England were without some of their squad for their previous tour and, two days before Sri Lanka departed for England, it was revealed that skipper Marvan Atapattu would miss the tour due to back problems that had forced him to skip his previous tour too. Jehan Mubarak was brought in as his replacement.

== Schedule ==
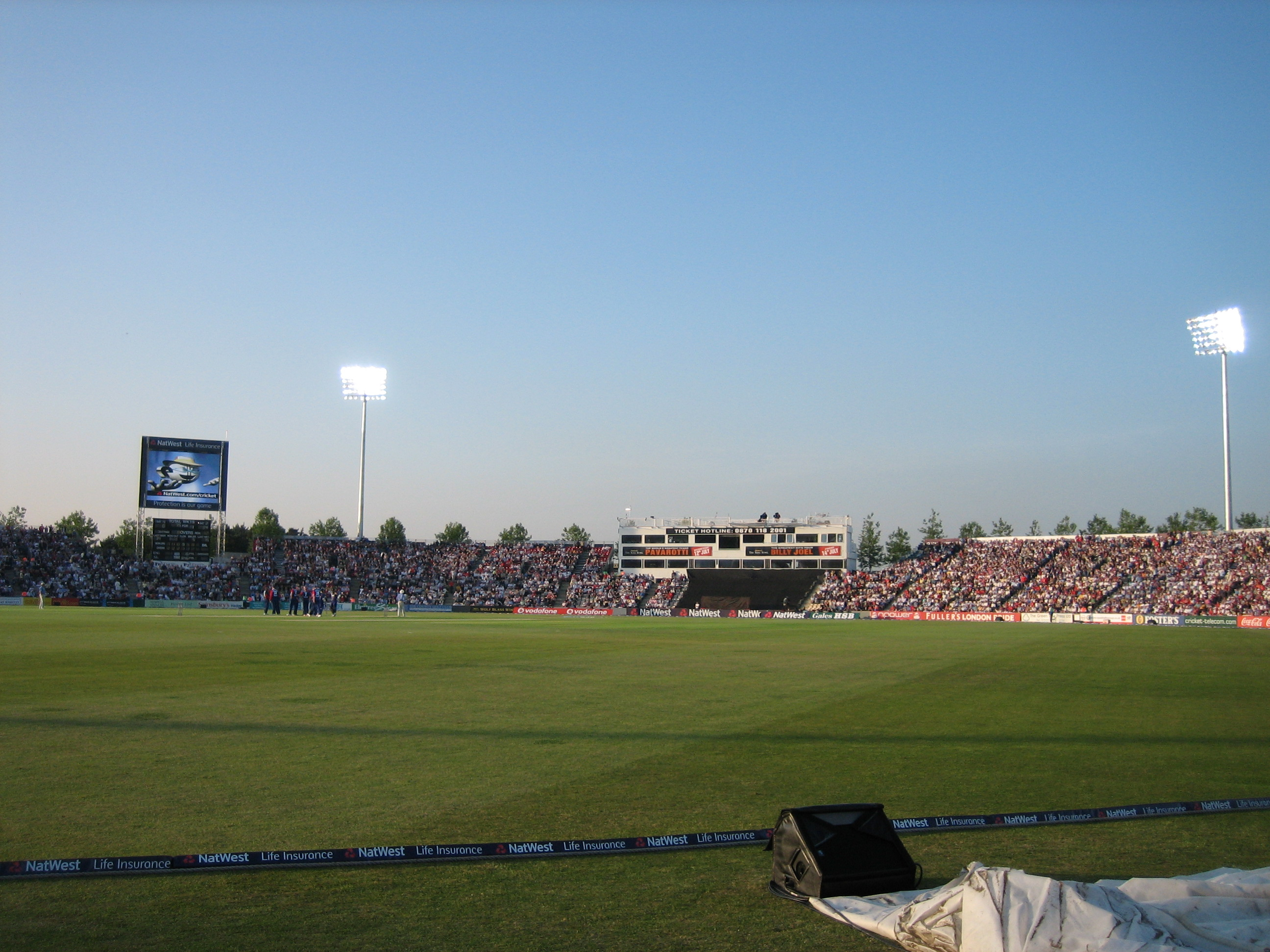
Twenty20 match at Rose Bowl

Date	Match	Venue
April
24-26	Tour Match	Fenner's
29–1 May	Tour Match	County Ground, Derby
May
4-7	Tour Match	New Road, Worcester
11-15	1st Test	Lord's
18-21	Tour Match	Country Ground, Hove
25-29	2nd Test	Edgbaston
June
2-6	3rd Test	Trent Bridge
15	Twenty20	Rose Bowl, Hampshire
17	1st ODI	Lord's
20	2nd ODI	The Oval
24	3rd ODI	Riverside Ground
28	4th ODI	Old Trafford
July
1	5th ODI	Headingley

== Squads ==
Sri Lanka (Test Squad)
- Mahela Jayawardene c
- Prasanna Jayawardene wk
- Kumar Sangakkara wk
- Malinga Bandara
- Tillakaratne Dilshan
- Chamara Kapugedera
- Nuwan Kulasekara
- Farveez Maharoof
- Lasith Malinga
- Jehan Mubarak
- Muttiah Muralitharan
- Thilan Samaraweera
- Upul Tharanga
- Chaminda Vaas
- Michael Vandort
- Nuwan Zoysa
England
- Andrew Flintoff Test c (Tests only)
- Andrew Strauss ODI c
- Geraint Jones wk
- Ian Bell
- Tim Bresnan (ODIs)
- Glen Chapple (ODIs)
- Paul Collingwood
- Alastair Cook
- Jamie Dalrymple (ODIs)
- Steve Harmison (ODIs)
- Matthew Hoggard (Tests)
- Ed Joyce (ODIs)
- Jon Lewis (Tests)
- Alex Loudon (ODIs)
- Sajid Mahmood
- Monty Panesar (Tests)
- Kevin Pietersen
- Liam Plunkett
- Marcus Trescothick

== Tour matches ==
=== Three-day match: Sri Lankans v British Universities ===
24–26 April 2006
Scorecard

Sri Lanka	v	(England) British Universities
289 (74.2 overs); Upul Tharanga 100 (134); Ruel Brathwaite 3/61 (18 overs)		125 (49.4 overs); Richard Clinton 44 (81); Chaminda Vaas 4/34 (17 overs)
256/6d (67 overs); Thilan Samaraweera 114* (183); David Balcombe 3/67 (18 overs)		130/8 (56 overs); Paul Harrison 28* (44); Chaminda Vaas 2/10 (10 overs)

Match drawn
Fenner's, Cambridge
Umpires: Michael Gough (Eng) and Nigel Llong (Eng)

- British Universities won the toss and elected to field.

=== Three-day match: Sri Lankans v Derbyshire ===
29 April–1 May 2006
Scorecard

(England) Derbyshire	v	Sri Lanka
219 (84 overs); Steve Stubbings 43 (138); Muttiah Muralitharan 3/47 (30 overs)		166/7d (47.5 overs); Chamara Kapugedera 45 (73); Kevin Dean 4/34 (11.5 overs)
208/4d (44 overs); Travis Birt 83 (53); Tillakaratne Dilshan 1/22 (3 overs)		262/4 (58.1 overs); Michael Vandort 90* (157); Ant Botha 2/10 (10 overs)

Match drawn
County Ground, Derby
Umpires: George Sharp (Eng) and Steve Garratt (Eng)

- Derbyshire won the toss and elected to bat first.

=== Four-day match: Sri Lankans v England A ===
4–6 May 2006
Scorecard

Sri Lanka	v	England A
179 (58.5 overs); Tillakaratne Dilshan 47 (100); Jon Lewis 6/49 (15 overs)		259 (87.3 overs); Rob Key 63 (118); Nuwan Kulasekara 4/83 (23 overs)
118 (50.3 overs); Tillakaratne Dilshan 40 (85); Stuart Broad 3/17 (11.3 overs)		41/0 (8 overs); Alastair Cook 22* (29)

England A won by 10 wickets
New Road, Worcester
Umpires: Martin Bodenham (Eng) and Peter Hartley (Eng)

- Sri Lankans won the toss and elected to bat first.

=== Four-day match: Sri Lankans v Sussex ===
18–21 April 2006
Scorecard

Sri Lanka	v	(England) Sussex
521/5d (161.4 overs); Upul Tharanga 140 (252); Tim Linley 1/56 (27 overs)		262 (85.5 overs); Ollie Rayner 101 (134); Lasith Malinga 5/79 (21.5 overs)
5/1 (2 overs); Kumar Sangakkara 2* (4); James Kirtley 1/2 (1 over)

Match drawn
County Ground, Hove
Umpires: Mark Benson (Eng) and Peter Willey (Eng)

- Sri Lankans won the toss and elected to bat first.
- Neil Turk and Ollie Rayner (Eng) both made their first-class debuts.

== Test series ==
=== 1st Test ===
11–15 May 2006
Scorecard

England	v	Sri Lanka
551/6d (143 overs); Kevin Pietersen 158 (205); Muttiah Muralitharan 3/158 (48 overs)		192 (55.3 overs); Mahela Jayawardene 61 (118); Matthew Hoggard 4/27 (14 overs)
		537/9 (f/o) (199 overs); Mahela Jayawardene 119 (220); Monty Panesar 2/49 (27 overs)

Match drawn
Lord's Cricket Ground, London
Umpires: Aleem Dar (Pak) and Rudi Koertzen (SA)
Player of the match: Mahela Jayawardene (SL)

- England won the toss and elected to bat first.
- Chamara Kapugedera (SL) and Sajid Mahmood (Eng) both made their Test debuts.

==== Day One ====
England won the toss and decided to bat. Flintoff handed Sajid Mahmood his first Test cap, while Chamara Kapugedera made his Test debut for Sri Lanka. Marcus Trescothick opened for England for the first time since last year, alongside Andrew Strauss. 20 minutes before lunch Muttiah Muralitharan was brought in for his first over at Lord's, the 23rd of the England innings, with the seamers not having taken a wicket. However, in the fourth over of Muralitharan's innings Jayawardene had Strauss caught off Muralitharan, putting the English at 86 for one at lunch. The afternoon session started with Alastair Cook, playing in his first home Test, coming in to face his first ball in home Test cricket; after leaving that one alone, he proceeded to 44 not out by tea, while Trescothick was on 95 not out. Trescothick got his hundred by "slogging" Muralitharan for a single, but in the next over he, too, perished through being caught by Jayawardene. England batted through to stumps and lost only one further wicket, with Cook caught behind off Farveez Maharoof's bowling for 89, and England closed with nightwatchman Matthew Hoggard at the crease and the overnight total 318 for three. Sri Lanka, however, had taken a catch off a no-ball, a close lbw against Kevin Pietersen turned down off Chaminda Vaas, and Alastair Cook a couple of inches from being run out.

==== Day Two ====
The day began with Hoggard staying in the crease opposite Pietersen for 37 balls before being bowled by Vaas. This gave way to Paul Collingwood, who had made his first Test century in the first Test of the 2005–06 India tour. Collingwood contributed 57 to a partnership of 173 between the two before Pietersen fell at 158 trapped lbw by Vaas, and Collingwood a few balls later fell in the same fashion by Muralitharan. With England six down, Andrew Flintoff and Geraint Jones were the new batsmen, and the two made scores 33 and 11 respectively before Flintoff declared following his second six, off Muralitharan. The umpires called tea time early due to the declaration and the touring team came back out with their openers Mubarak and Tharanga. However, Mubarak quickly went back, after he was bowled by Hoggard without a run scored by any of the batsmen. Tharanga went five overs later, though with a more successful partnership of 21, the same number of runs the third Sri Lankan, Kumar Sangakkara, managed to make before caught off Sajid Mahmood, his first Test dismissal. At this time, they were 81 for two: fifteen minutes later, the scoreboard read 85 for six, with three batsmen out for ducks including debutante Kapugedera who fell on his first Test ball. The day's play was curtailed by bad light, which left Sri Lanka at 91 for six, fourteen of which came off English extras, while Mahmood's debut figures read three for nine.

==== Day Three ====
It started with the clement weather of the last few days overshadowed by clouds and the forecast of rain. With Mahmood unable to add to his tally from yesterday, conceding 41 runs on the day. Sri Lanka batted through ten overs, but Farveez Maharoof gave a return catch to Hoggard, and two overs later Flintoff makes a breakthrough, getting Jayawardene out with a catch by wicket-keeper Geraint Jones. However, the ninth-wicket stand between Vaas and Nuwan Kulasekara gave the most runs of the entire innings, as the two add 62 in just over an hour. After lunch, however, they were out in the space of three deliveries, and Sri Lanka were all out for 192.

Flintoff enforced the follow on, and once again Mubarak was out in single figures to Hoggard, the total 10 for one. However, Tharanga and Sangakkara built Sri Lanka's largest partnership of the match thus far, both making half-centuries and sharing a stand of 109. Eventually both batsmen were caught by Jones off spinner Monty Panesar, with Sangakkara's innings lasting four and a half hours for 65 runs, but at this point England required seven wickets and had two days to do it in.

==== Day Four ====
Nightwatchman Farveez Maharoof frustrated the England bowlers. He was dropped on 30 by Paul Collingwood, and went on to bat through 40 overs and 166 minutes, as Sri Lanka went through the entire morning session without loss. England then got two wickets in five overs, both courtesy of Sajid Mahmood, but that only brought in Tillakaratne Dilshan. Another 20 overs followed without a wicket, with Mahela Jayawardene completing his century, before being caught behind for 119 four overs before the close of play on day four, as 24 overs were cut due to bad light.

==== Day Five ====
Sri Lanka then lost both their last specialist batsmen, Kapugedera and Dilshan, but were leading by 62 runs at that time. The ninth-wicket partners Vaas and Kulasekara, however, had already showed their batting skills by having the highest partnership of the first innings, and they were eight runs away from achieving that again in the second. Batting through 189 minutes, the pair secured the draw for Sri Lanka, with Kulasekara even hitting a couple of sixes as he ended with 64 when Pietersen held a catch off Hoggard's bowling. However, by then it was too late, as Sri Lanka led by 167 runs and there was only half an hour left to score those runs in. Indeed, the tenth-wicket stand frustrated England until stumps: Muralitharan faced out that half-hour, scoring one run, while Vaas got his half-century before the close of play.

=== 2nd Test ===
25–28 May 2006 (Note: While five days of play were scheduled for each Test, the second and third Test reached a result in four days.)
Scorecard

Sri Lanka	v	England
141 (51.2 overs); Chaminda Vaas 30 (78); Liam Plunkett 3/43 (12 overs)		295 (78.3 overs); Kevin Pietersen 142 (157); Muttiah Muralitharan 6/86 (25 overs)
231 (93.2 overs); Michael Vandort 105 (303); Liam Plunkett 3/17 (13.2 overs)		81/4 (27.2 overs); Alastair Cook 34* (85); Muttiah Muralitharan 4/29 (12.2 overs)

England won by 6 wickets
Edgbaston, Birmingham
Umpires: Aleem Dar (Pak) and Darrell Hair (Aus)
Player of the match: Kevin Pietersen (Eng)

- Sri Lanka won the toss and elected to bat.

==== Day One ====
Sri Lanka won the toss and skipper Mahela Jayawardene chose to bat; it seemed that they made the wrong choice as England crippled them to 82/8 with the help of a swinging wicket, before Chaminda Vaas and Lasith Malinga put up a half century partnership and the team were all out for 141. Matthew Hoggard's swinging and cult-hero Monty Panesar put on impressive shows but regular ODI player, Liam Plunkett, was the real boon of the side. Before the end of the first day, England had all but closed the deficit as stumps was called at 138/3, Marcus Trescothick and Andrew Strauss putting on a 56 partnership before Alastair Cook came out, soon followed by big-hitter Kevin Pietersen who was 30 at stumps aided by a 6, and went on to score another Test century the next day - the only batsmen in the first innings to hit more than 30. Despite the hot-headed player's skills, England were not fully confident at the slip, Cook being saved by a dropped ball by the Sri Lanka skipper and Muttiah Muralitharan proved quite a threat.

==== Day Two ====
Pietersen opened the second day, 80 minutes late thanks to rain, with nightwatchmen Hoggard, the latter putting on his normal single figures, this time 3 runs, but holding the line for 36 balls. Once normal play resumed with Paul Collingwood England continued to dominate, setting their targets high with a 69 partnership before Collingwood gloved Murali to short leg for 238/5 and was replaced by skipper Andrew Flintoff who was surprisingly tame. Pietersen went on to hit three 4s in as many balls before hitting a reverse-sweeper 6 but then being bowled lbw by Murali, achieving three Test centuries in consecutive Tests. After the departure of their number four, England crumbled hopelessly from 290/6 to 295 all out just before tea. The mood in the English camp was swiftly revitalised by the hot drinks as Hoggard bowled Upul Tharanga for a golden duck, having been bowled for nothing in the first innings. Two more men went to see the tourists at 43/3 with a 111 run deficit and before the close of play Geraint Jones redeemed his missed catch to Thilan Samaraweera by stumping soon after, unbeaten opener Michael Vandort remained at the crease for 30 when play closed at 7:30 due to the missed play earlier.

==== Day Three ====
After persistent rain over Birmingham, play was started at 4:45 and the fifth wicket held up for 125, helping them take the lead. Both batsmen fought off good efforts by Panesar and Plunkett but eventually it was Hoggard who made the only breakthrough on a day where Sri Lanka stood tall for a short day at 194/5.

==== Day Four ====
With the new ball due six overs into the fourth day Sri Lankan wickets fell thick and fast, half the team falling before lunch, the last of which being opener Michael Vandort who narrowly missed out on being the fifth batsmen ever to hold his wicket throughout an entire innings. England took to the crease just before lunch with a very slow run rate that came only from Strauss - Trescothick fell after nine runs, none of them contributed by him. The third man, Alastair Cook held out for the rest of the innings though achieving 34 not out; during this time Strauss fell to a controversial catch, replays showed it popped off his pads. Pietersen, wanting to end the Test quickly, took the wicket with his usual speed, taking 13 runs off 25 balls his confidence assured by a catch by the tourists' skipper to be called a no ball, and a further two no balls which he took boundaries off. However, his cockiness proved his downfall as he lashed out at a ball from Murali, the only bowler to take wickets in the second innings, and was caught plumb. Collingwood soon fell for 3 and it seemed as if the easy target of 78 was going to be more of a struggle but Cook, remaining from the second partnership, took two runs and two byes and skipper Flintoff, who done nothing with his first three balls, drove Murali down the ground to long on for four on his fourth ball to win the match, and his third in a row as English skipper.

=== 3rd Test ===
2–5 June 2006
Scorecard

Sri Lanka	v	England
231 (66.2 overs); Chaminda Vaas 38 (94); Andrew Flintoff 3/52 (15 overs)		229 (91.1 overs); Paul Collingwood 48 (184); Muttiah Muralitharan 3/62 (31 overs)
322 (113.1 overs); Kumar Sangakkara 66 (133); Monty Panesar 5/78 (37.1 overs)		190 (68.5 overs); Andrew Strauss 55 (155); Muttiah Muralitharan 8/70 (30 overs)

Sri Lanka won by 134 runs
Trent Bridge, Nottingham
Umpires: Darrell Hair (Aus) and Rudi Koertzen (SA)
Player of the match: Muttiah Muralitharan (SL)

- Sri Lanka won the toss and elected to bat.
- Jon Lewis (Eng) made his Test debut.

==== Day One ====
Sri Lanka came into the third Test looking to level the series, and Mahela Jayawardene won the toss and again chose to bat. Nuwan Kulasekara and Thilan Samaraweera were dropped from the side, and Sanath Jayasuriya and Chamara Kapugedera came in. This was a return to test cricket for Jayasuriya following a previously announced retirement.

As at Edgbaston, Sri Lanka struggled batting first and Andrew Flintoff and Jon Lewis (who was in the side on debut replacing Sajid Mahmood) took 5 wickets between them to leave Sri Lanka on 139/8. However, England were unable to finish things off and Chaminda Vaas, who had shown resistance batting throughout the series, added 92 runs with the last two wickets. Muttiah Muralitharan hit 3 fours and 1 six in a very useful cameo, which included some remarkable shots. This late flurry of runs would prove critical in the match.

England's openers began the reply tentatively, and by the end of the first day, England were 53/2 in reply to Sri Lanka's 231.

==== Day Two ====
Sri Lanka came out on the second day with a very positive approach, which was noticeable from the start of the day's play. Their body language was positive, and Mahela Jayawardene displayed good strategic application with the field placings he set, and frustrated England's batsmen in the process. A key point was the dismissal of Kevin Pietersen for 41, given that he had scored big centuries in the first innings of the previous two tests. Andrew Flintoff was dismissed cheaply and Sri Lanka had gained momentum in reducing England to 118/5.

The remaining batsmen struggled, with Paul Collingwood taking nearly 4 hours to score the innings highest score of 48. Jon Lewis hit a quickfire 20 to boost the score to almost parity with Sri Lanka as England were bowled out for 229. Although Sri Lanka lost Michael Vandort in the first over of their second innings, they reached 45/1 by the close of play on the second day.

==== Day Three ====
Sri Lanka showed application in their approach to batting, knowing that they did not need to score at a quick rate given the amount of time remaining in the match. Kumar Sangakkara and Chamara Kapugedera both scored 50s, and Jayawardene and Upul Tharanga scored 45 and 46 respectively. By the end of the day, their score had progressed to 286/7, a lead of 288.

==== Day Four ====
England took the final three Sri Lankan wickets, but not without their score progressing to 322 – thanks to the efforts of Lasith Malinga, who scored 22, and Chaminda Vaas who was unbeaten on 34. England had only managed to dismiss him twice in the entire series.

For England, Monty Panesar took his first five wicket haul, recording figures of 5/78. This left England needing 325 to win, a record for Trent Bridge.

England started their chase confidently, albeit with some slices of luck. Marcus Trescothick and Andrew Strauss progressed the score to 84 before the first wicket fell, to Muttiah Muralitharan. From that point on, Muralitharan assumed total control of the match, and of England's batsman.

He proceeded to take the next 6 wickets, reducing England to 132/7, and at that point, would have harboured hopes of capturing all 10 wickets. However, the next wicket to fall was to a run out. But this did not deter him, and he took a further wicket – that of Jon Lewis to leave the score at 153/9. England were on the verge of defeat, still needing 172 to win with one wicket remaining.

All was left to do was for Monty Panesar to dispel the popular belief that he was incapable of batting – he proceeded to attack Muralitharan's bowling – hitting 3 fours and one remarkable swept six on the way to a career best 26. In the end, Muralitharan did not claim his wicket – with Jayasuriya being the one to dismiss him lbw.

England had been bowled out for 190 – pretty much by one man. Muralitharan's figures of 8/70 earned him man of the match, and were his second best bowling figures recorded. Sri Lanka won the match by 134 runs and squared the series. They would go on to carry this momentum into the one day series that followed.

== Limited Over Matches ==
=== Tour Match: Sri Lanka v Essex (9 June) ===
Essex 174-4 (38) beat Sri Lanka 172 (43.3) by 6 wickets.

=== Tour Match: Sri Lanka v Somerset (11 June) ===
Somerset 332-6 (50) beat Sri Lanka 281 (46.3) by 51 runs

=== Twenty20 International Match ===
15 June
Scorecard

Sri Lanka; 163 (20 overs)	v	England; 161/5 (20 overs)
Sanath Jayasuriya 41 (30); Paul Collingwood 4/22 (4 overs)		Marcus Trescothick 72 (58); Sanath Jayasuriya 2/32 (4 overs)

Sri Lanka won by 2 runs
Rose Bowl, Southampton, England
Umpires: Ian Gould (Eng) and Nigel Llong (Eng)
Player of the match: Sanath Jayasuriya (SL)

=== First ODI ===
17 June
Scorecard

Sri Lanka; 257/9 (50 overs)	v	England; 237/9 (50 overs)
Upul Tharanga 120 (156); Steve Harmison 3/52 (10 overs)		Jamie Dalrymple 67 (87); Lasith Malinga 3/26 (9 overs)

Sri Lanka won by 20 runs
Lord's Cricket Ground, London, England
Umpires: Darrell Hair (Aus) and Nigel Llong (Eng)

- Tim Bresnan (Eng) made his ODI debut.

=== Second ODI ===
20 June
Scorecard

Sri Lanka; 319/8 (50 overs)	v	England; 273 (46.4 overs)
Sanath Jayasuriya 122 (136); Steve Harmison 3/31 (10 overs)		Kevin Pietersen 73 (77); Sanath Jayasuriya 3/51 (9 overs)

Sri Lanka won by 46 runs
The Oval, London, England
Umpires: Darrell Hair (Aus) and Ian Gould (Eng)

=== Third ODI ===
24 June
Scorecard

England; 261/7 (50 overs)	v	Sri Lanka; 265/2 (42.2 overs)
Ian Bell 77 (114); Chaminda Vaas 2/38 (9 overs)		Mahela Jayawardene 126* (127); Jamie Dalrymple 1/40 (9 overs)

Sri Lanka won by 8 wickets
Riverside Ground, Chester-le-Street, England
Umpires: Mark Benson (Eng) and Billy Doctrove (WI)

- Alex Loudon (Eng) made his ODI debut.

=== Fourth ODI ===
28 June
Scorecard

Sri Lanka; 318/7 (50 overs)	v	England; 285 (48.4 overs)
Mahela Jayawardene 100 (83); Jamie Dalrymple 2/44 (10 overs)		Andrew Strauss 45 (44); Malinga Bandara 2/43 (10 overs)

Sri Lanka won by 33 runs
Old Trafford Cricket Ground, Manchester, England
Umpires: Billy Doctrove (WI) and Nigel Llong (Eng)
Player of the match: Mahela Jayawardene (SL)

- Alastair Cook (Eng) made his ODI debut.

=== Fifth ODI ===
1 July
Scorecard

England; 321/7 (50 overs)	v	Sri Lanka; 324/2 (37.3 overs)
Marcus Trescothick 121 (118); Lasith Malinga 4/44 (10 overs)		Sanath Jayasuriya 152 (99); Vikram Solanki 1/17 (3.3 overs)

Sri Lanka won by 8 wickets
Headingley Cricket Ground, Leeds, England
Umpires: Mark Benson (Eng) and Billy Doctrove (WI)
Player of the match: Sanath Jayasuriya (SL)

Sri Lanka completed their 5-0 rout of England's one day side. Although England had recorded their highest score of the series batting first - 321/7, the Sri Lankans were enjoying good success and this posed little threat.

England batted first having won the toss, and looked to be putting themselves in a strong position, guided by a century from Marcus Trescothick. Alastair Cook and Vikram Solanki also had scores in the 40s, and 321/7 seemed a reasonable total at the halfway stage.

However, any hopes that the 5-0 whitewash would be averted were quickly dispelled by Sanath Jayasuriya and Upul Tharanga, who both launched into the bowling attack which they knew had had its confidence already battered from the previous encounters of the series.

The first ten overs of the Sri Lankan reply yielded an amazing 133 runs. Andrew Strauss kept turning to different bowlers, even calling on the spin of Jamie Dalrymple as early as the 8th over in a futile attempt to stem the flow of runs. But Jayasuriya and Tharanga were unstoppable, and although their scoring rates tapered off slightly when fielding restrictions were lifted, they continued on their merry way and racked up an enormous partnership of 286, which was broken in the 32nd over - with only 36 more needed to win at this point.

Jayasuriya brought up his century in 72 balls, and Tharanga in 82. Tharanga was caught and bowled by Dalrymple for 109 with the score on 286/1, and Jayasuriya went 4 balls later for an outstanding 152 off just 99 balls.

Kumar Sangakkara and Mahela Jayawardene had over 17 overs left to score the remaining 33 runs, and the victory was completed soon after. The target of 322 was chased down with 12.3 overs to spare, and the whitewash complete.
