= Neil Turk =

Former English cricketer

- Born: Neil Richard Keith Turk; 28 April 1983 (age 43); Cuckfield
- Occupation: Former Cricketer

Neil Richard Keith Turk (born 28 April 1983, Cuckfield) is an English former cricketer. He is a left-handed specialist batsman with occasional right-arm medium-pace bowling, as well as a FIFA approved referee. Furthermore, Neil Turk studied Sports Science at Exeter University from 2001 to 2004.

He used to play club cricket for Wimbledon CC in the ECB Surrey Premier League, where he was 1st team captain.

Turk received an official berth in the Sussex squad in 2005, though his debut for the county's second XI came in July 2002, and his debut for the first XI in September at Essex where he scored 36, which remained his highest List A score. At the end of the 2006 season, Turk was released from Sussex, with his "perceived lack of future opportunity" cited as reason for his departure. He played one first-class match, scoring 24 and bowling three wicketless overs against the touring Sri Lankans in 2006.
