= Azeez Mubarak =

Sri Lankan scientist and researcher

- Born: Azeez Mohamed Mubarak; 4 July 1951 (age 75); Colombo, Ceylon
- Education: University of Cambridge; University of Ceylon; Royal College Colombo
- Occupations: Scientist, researcher

Azeez Mohamed Mubarak (born 4 July 1951) is a Sri Lankan scientist and researcher. He was the Director/CEO of Industrial Technology Institute (formerly CISIR) from 2002 to 2012. He served as the Chief of Research and Innovation at Sri Lanka Institute of Nanotechnology from 2020 to 2022.

Born to a large family, he received his primary education at Greenland College and secondary education at the Royal College, Colombo. In 1971 he gained admission to the University of Ceylon, Colombo and graduated with a BSc first class Honours Degree in Chemistry. During his time at the university he captained the university cricket and soccer teams and was a member of the hockey and badminton teams.

Briefly playing cricket for the Moors Sports Club, he won the Commonwealth Scholarship to do his PhD at the University of Cambridge from 1976 to 1980. There he played First-class cricket for the Cambridge University cricket team and won blues for cricket. After gaining his PhD he went on to the University of Maryland for postgraduate research.

He is a Rotarian and a Past President of the Colombo South Rotary Club. He is married to Chitranganie (née De Silva), former Chairperson of Information and Communication Technology Agency (ICTA) and has a son and daughter. His son Jehan Mubarak has played cricket for Sri Lanka in all formats of the game. His daughter Kamakshi currently works for the World Bank in Washington DC.
