= Sagara Gallage =

Sri Lankan cricketer and umpire (born 1964)

Personal information
- Born: 10 December 1964 (age 61); Kurunegala, Sri Lanka
- Source: Cricinfo, 30 January 2016

Sagara Gallage (born 10 December 1964) is a Sri Lankan former first-class cricketer who played for Sri Lanka Air Force Sports Club. Later, he became an umpire and stood in matches in the 2007–08 Inter-Provincial Twenty20 tournament.
