= Asadullah Khan =

Afghan cricketer and cricket administrator

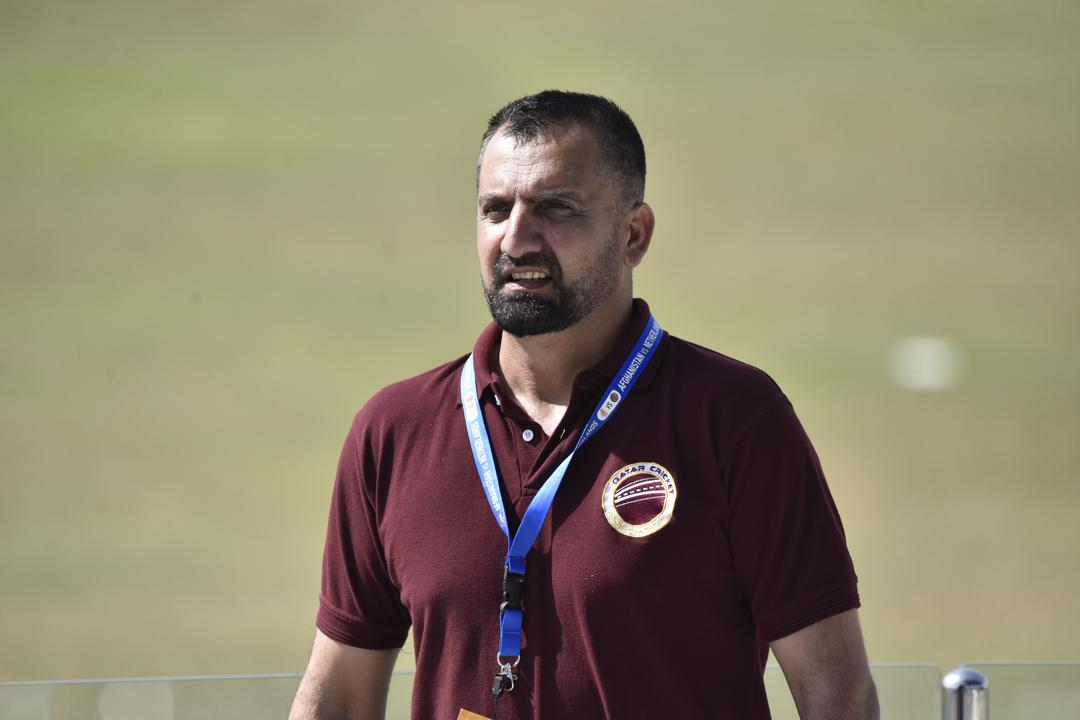
- Former Professional Cricketer, ICC Level 3 Certified Coach, High-Performance Cricket Educator

Personal information
- Full name: Asadullah Khan
- Born: Afghanistan
- Batting: Right-Handed
- Bowling: Right-Arm Off Spin
- Role: Coach

International information
- National side: Afghanistan

Domestic team information
- Years: Team
- 2003–2008: Afghanistan

Head coaching information
- Years: Team
- 2021-2023: Qatar
- Source: ESPNcricinfo, 23 March 2026

Asadullah Khan is an Afghan former cricketer, coach, and cricket administrator. He has served in multiple roles within the Afghanistan Cricket Board (ACB), including chief selector and acting chief executive officer. He has also worked as head coach of the Qatar national cricket team and as tournament director for the Gulf Cup 2025.

== Playing career ==
Asadullah Khan is a former domestic cricketer who played as a right-handed batsman and a right-arm medium-pace bowler.

=== Early international involvement ===
Khan was part of Afghanistan's squad in their first recorded international match against Oman during the 2004 ACC Trophy held in Malaysia, where he scored the team's first run.

He later contributed to the development and promotion of cricket in Tajikistan through his involvement with the Tajikistan Cricket Federation.

=== Coaching and development ===
Khan has been part of the ICC High Performance Program during 2014, 2015, and 2016, contributing to elite-level cricket development initiatives.

He has also served in coaching and development roles across multiple international assignments, including in Afghanistan, Qatar, Canada, and the United States.

In addition to his cricketing career, Khan represented Afghanistan in a Guinness World Record yoga event held in Doha, Qatar, in March 2022, under the aegis of the Embassy of India.

== Administrative and coaching career ==
=== Afghanistan Cricket Board ===
Khan has held several key positions within the Afghanistan Cricket Board (ACB), including serving as chief selector of the national team.

He previously resigned from the role of chief selector in 2021, citing interference from non-cricketers in the selection process.

In June 2023, he was reappointed as Afghanistan's chief selector, replacing Noorulhaq Malikzai.

He has also served as acting chief executive officer of the Afghanistan Cricket Board.

=== Coaching career ===
Khan has worked as head coach of the Qatar national cricket team before returning to Afghanistan cricket administration.

=== Gulf Cup 2025 ===
In 2025, Khan was appointed as the tournament director for the Gulf Cup 2025, a youth cricket tournament held in Sharjah.

== Public statements ==
Khan has publicly commented on cricket-related issues, including criticising the politicisation of cricket in relation to Afghanistan.

He has also acknowledged the role of the Board of Control for Cricket in India (BCCI) and the Indian Premier League (IPL) in the development of Afghanistan cricket.
