= Mesbahuddin Ahmed =

Bangladeshi cricket umpire (born 1962)

Personal information
- Born: 31 October 1962 (age 64); Dhaka, Bangladesh

Umpiring information
- ODIs umpired: 1 (2002)
- Source: Cricinfo, 16 May 2014

Mesbahuddin Ahmed (born 31 October 1962) is a Bangladeshi former cricket umpire. He only officiated in a single One Day International, in 2002.

== See also ==
- List of One Day International cricket umpires
