= Robin Weston =

English cricketer

Robin Michael Swann Weston (born 7 June 1975) is an English cricketer who played for Durham, Derbyshire, and Middlesex.

Weston is the son of Mike Weston who played for Durham until 1972. His first-class career started with a two-year stint at Durham where he had played since his Second XI Championship debut in May 1992. With three youth Tests before his nineteenth birthday, Weston joined the Durham first team in 1995, where he played for two years.

Weston made his debut for Derbyshire in July 1998 against the South Africans and then against Northamptonshire, where he hit a half-century despite an innings defeat. He left Derbyshire at the end of 1999 to join Middlesex.

After a shaky first year with Middlesex, Weston made a comeback in 2001, as he made three centuries and finished the season with an average in the 40s. He helped the team in 2002 towards Championship glory. After the 2003 season, Weston abandoned first-class cricket. He was a right-handed batsman and right-arm leg-break bowler.

Weston's brother Philip had a somewhat longer career playing for Worcestershire and Gloucestershire.
