= Jasbir Singh (cricketer) =

Indian cricketer and umpire (born 1950)

Personal information
- Born: 14 March 1950 (age 76); Amritsar, Punjab, India
- Batting: Right-handed
- Bowling: Slow left-arm orthodox
- Role: Bowler

Domestic team information
- Years: Team
- 1967/68: Northern Punjab
- 1968/69-1976/77: Punjab

Umpiring information
- ODIs umpired: 6 (1994–2000)
- WODIs umpired: 3 (1997)
- Source: CricketArchive, 4 May 2025

Jasbir Singh (born 14 March 1950) is a former Indian cricketer and umpire. He stood in six One Day Internationals from 1994 to 2000. He played 37 first-class matches for Northern Punjab and Punjab from 1964 to 1977 before making his umpiring debut in 1990.

== See also ==
- List of One Day International cricket umpires
