= Hemin Desai =

Indian-born cricketer

Personal information
- Full name: Hemin Pratap Desai
- Born: September 10, 1977 (age 49); Bulsar, Gujarat, India
- Batting: Right-handed
- Bowling: Right-arm fast-medium

Career statistics
Competition	LA
Matches	18
Runs scored	500
Batting average	29.41
100s/50s	0/4
Top score	82
Balls bowled	699
Wickets	17
Bowling average	47.88
5 wickets in innings	0
10 wickets in match	0
Best bowling	3/45
Catches/stumpings	9/0
- Source: CricketArchive, 24 April 2009

Hemin Pratap Desai (born September 10, 1977) is an Indian-born cricketer who played for the Oman national cricket team at the List A level.

== Career ==
On 1 November 2007, Desai was named player of the match during the Asian Cricket Council Twenty20 Cup semi-final between Oman and Kuwait. His highest score in List A cricket was achieved on November 27, 2007, against Namibia in the 2007 ICC World Cricket League Division Two. Opening the batting, Desai completely dominated his first-wicket partnership with Zeeshan Siddiqui, scoring an extraordinary 82 runs out of 84 before being first out. One run went to his batting partner and one to Extras. Oman won the game by two wickets.
