= Ivaturi Shivram =

Indian cricket umpire (born 1954)

Personal information
- Born: 23 July 1954 (age 72); Chennai, India

Umpiring information
- ODIs umpired: 9 (1994–2002)
- WODIs umpired: 2 (1997–2002)
- Source: ESPNcricinfo, 30 May 2014

Ivaturi Shivram (born 23 July 1954) is a former Indian cricket umpire. He stood in nine ODI games from 1994 to 2002.

== See also ==
- List of One Day International cricket umpires
