= Tharaka Kottehewa =

Sri Lankan cricketer (born 1985)

Personal information
- Full name: Dasun Tharaka Kottehewa
- Born: 27 June 1985 (age 41); Colombo, Sri Lanka
- Batting: Right-handed
- Bowling: Right-arm fast-medium

Domestic team information
- Years: Team
- 2005-06 to 2011-12: Nondescripts Cricket Club
- Source: Cricinfo, 24 September 2018

Dasun Tharaka Kottehewa (born 27 June 1985) is a Sri Lankan first-class cricketer who played for Nondescripts Cricket Club from 2005 to 2012.

Kottehewa captained the First XI at Royal College, Colombo, in 2003-04. In a List A match against Ragama Cricket Club at Moors Sports Club Ground in December 2007, he took two hat-tricks in one innings, and finished with figures of 8 for 20.
