= Tharindu Thushan =

Sri Lankan cricketer (born 1989)

Personal information
- Born: 9 October 1989 (age 37); Panadura, Sri Lanka
- Source: Cricinfo, 30 January 2016

Tharindu Thushan (born 9 October 1989) is a Sri Lankan first-class cricketer who plays for Panadura Sports Club.
