= Sailab Hossain =

Bangladeshi cricket umpire (born 1958)

Personal information
- Born: 30 August 1958 (age 68); Dhaka, Bangladesh

Umpiring information
- ODIs umpired: 3 (2001–2002)
- Source: Cricinfo, 19 May 2014

Sailab Hossain (born 30 August 1958) is a Bangladeshi former cricket umpire. He has officiated in three ODI games in 2001 and 2002.

== See also ==
- List of One Day International cricket umpires
