= Grashan Liyanage =

Sri Lankan cricketer (born 1963)

Personal information
- Born: 15 October 1963 (age 63); Matara, Sri Lanka
- Source: Cricinfo, 30 January 2016

Grashan Liyanage (born 15 October 1963) is a Sri Lankan former first-class cricketer who played for Galle Cricket Club. Later, he became an umpire and stood in matches in the 2007–08 Inter-Provincial Twenty20 tournament.
