= Michael Vandort =

Sri Lankan cricketer (born 1980)

Personal information
- Full name: Michael Graydon Vandort
- Born: 19 January 1980 (age 46); Colombo, Sri Lanka
- Nickname: Vanda
- Height: 6 ft 5 in (1.96 m)
- Batting: Left-handed
- Bowling: Right-arm medium
- Role: Batsman

International information
- National side: Sri Lanka (2001–2008)
- Test debut (cap 87): 6 September 2001 v Bangladesh
- Last Test: 26 December 2008 v Bangladesh
- Only ODI (cap 128): 13 January 2006 v Australia

Domestic team information
- Years: Team
- 1998/99–2009/10: Colombo Cricket Club
- 2007/08–2009/10: Wayamba
- 2010/11–2013/14: Ragama Cricket Club
- 2011/12: Nondescripts Cricket Club
- 2013/14: Khelaghar SKS

Career statistics
Competition	Test	ODI	FC	LA
Matches	20	1	171	105
Runs scored	1,144	48	8,940	3,116
Batting average	36.90	48.00	32.98	34.24
100s/50s	4/4	0/0	20/41	5/16
Top score	140	48	251	118
Balls bowled	–	–	67	–
Wickets	–	–	1	–
Bowling average	–	–	62.00	–
5 wickets in innings	–	–	0	–
10 wickets in match	–	–	0	–
Best bowling	–	–	1/46	–
Catches/stumpings	6/–	0/–	122/–	31/–
- Source: ESPNcricinfo, 25 January 2025

Michael Graydon Vandort (born 19 January 1980) is a Sri Lankan former cricketer. He is a left-handed batsman and a right-arm medium-pace bowler. He made his Twenty20 debut on 17 August 2004, for Colombo Cricket Club in the 2004 SLC Twenty20 Tournament. He is of Dutch Burgher ancestry and was educated at St. Joseph's College.

== International career ==
Vandort made his Test debut for Sri Lanka in March 2001 against England. Having emerged in 2001 after impressive club performances, he was picked against Bangladesh in September 2001 after an impressive century. His Test average was 36.90. He scored a century in Sri Lanka's defeat to England on 28 May 2006. He nearly became the first batsman since Javed Omar in 2001 to carry the bat through the innings. In his one-day international debut against Australia he scored a Test-like 48 off 117 balls in a run-chase of 318, and did not play an ODI for the remainder of his career. However, he was selected to play in the Tests against Australia and scored a gritty 82 in the first Test in Brisbane. He is considered a good slips fielder but less effective in the outfield. Vandort had a few notable performances, including scoring a century in each innings (140 and 105*) against Bangladesh in 2007.

He was dropped from the Sri Lankan Test team following a string of poor performances, especially against India in 2008–09.
