= Sujeewa de Silva =

Sri Lankan cricketer (born 1979)

Personal information
- Full name: Weddikkara Ruwan Sujeewa de Silva
- Born: 7 October 1979 (age 47); Beruwala, Sri Lanka
- Batting: Right-handed
- Bowling: Left-arm medium-fast
- Role: Bowler

International information
- National side: Sri Lanka (2002–2007)
- Test debut (cap 89): 21 July 2002 v Bangladesh
- Last Test: 11 July 2007 v Bangladesh

Career statistics
Competition	Test	FC	LA	T20
Matches	3	113	73	17
Runs scored	10	935	162	6
Batting average	10.00	8.50	6.48	6.00
100s/50s	0/0	0/0	0/0	0/0
Top score	5*	47	21*	2*
Balls bowled	432	13,153	3,009	309
Wickets	11	339	108	25
Bowling average	19.00	23.96	22.29	14.88
5 wickets in innings	0	11	2	0
10 wickets in match	0	0	0	0
Best bowling	4/35	7/49	7/25	4/16
Catches/stumpings	1/–	38/–	14/–	4/–
- Source: ESPNcricinfo, 9 January 2017

Weddikkara Ruwan Sujeewa de Silva (born 7 October 1979) is a Sri Lankan former international cricketer. He is a right-handed batsman and a left-arm medium-fast bowler. He is a past student of Kalutara Vidyalaya.

== Domestic career ==
In 2000 he broke the record for the most wickets in the Premier Under-23 Trophy, but failed to attract the selectors. He made his Twenty20 debut on 17 August 2004, for Colombo Cricket Club in the 2004 SLC Twenty20 Tournament.

== International career ==
He made his Test debut on 21 July 2002 against Bangladesh as the Sri Lanka's 89th Test cap. In 2007, he was called up to the squad as cover for an injured Chanaka Welagedara, but did not play a match.
