= Jagath Nandakumar =

Sri Lankan cricketer (born 1969)

Personal information
- Born: 21 May 1969 (age 57); Matara, Sri Lanka
- Source: Cricinfo, 30 January 2016

Jagath Nandakumar (born 21 May 1969) is a Sri Lankan former first-class cricketer who played for Matara Sports Club. His first match was an unofficial test between Sri Lanka A and Pakistan A at Galle in 2001. Later, he became an umpire and stood in matches in the 2007–08 Inter-Provincial Twenty20 tournament.
