= Jehan Mubarak =

Sri Lankan cricketer

Personal information
- Full name: Jehan Mubarak
- Born: 10 January 1981 (age 45); Washington, D.C., U.S
- Nickname: Muba
- Height: 6 ft 2 in (1.88 m)
- Batting: Left-handed
- Bowling: Right arm off spin
- Role: Batsman
- Relatives: A. M. Mubarak (father)

International information
- National side: Sri Lanka (2002–2015)
- Test debut (cap 91): 28 July 2002 v Bangladesh
- Last Test: 20 August 2015 v India
- ODI debut (cap 113): 27 November 2002 v South Africa
- Last ODI: 23 July 2013 v South Africa
- ODI shirt no.: 42 (previously 11)
- T20I debut (cap 17): 14 September 2007 v Kenya
- Last T20I: 21 June 2009 v Pakistan
- T20I shirt no.: 42

Domestic team information
- Years: Team
- 2000/01–2017: Colombo Cricket Club
- 2012: Duronto Rajshahi
- Kalabagan Krira Chakra
- 2012–2017: Khulna Royal Bengals
- 2012–2013: Uthura Rudras
- 2013–2015: Wayamba United

Career statistics
Competition	Test	ODI	T20I
Matches	13	40	16
Runs scored	385	704	238
Batting average	17.05	22.70	21.63
100s/50s	0/0	0/4	0/0
Top score	49	72	46*
Balls bowled	103	129	8
Wickets	0	2	1
Bowling average	–	47.50	17.00
5 wickets in innings	–	0	0
10 wickets in match	–	0	0
Best bowling	–	1/10	1/9
Catches/stumpings	13/–	12/–	9/–
- Source: CricInfo, 31 August 2017

Jehan Mubarak (Sinhala: ජෙහාන් මුබාරක්; Tamil: ஜெகன் முபாரக்; born 10 January 1981) is a Sri Lankan former professional cricketer who played all three formats of the game. A left-handed batsman and a right-arm off-break bowler, Mubarak was a member of the Sri Lankan squads at the 2003 Cricket World Cup and the inaugural 2007 ICC World Twenty20. Born in Washington, D.C., he is one of the few Test cricketers to have been born in the United States.

== Personal life ==
The son of Azeez Mohamed Mubarak, a first-class cricketer himself and later a prominent scientist, Mubarak was born in Washington, D.C., making him, with West Indian Ken Weekes, one of only two Test cricketers born in the United States. His family soon returned to Sri Lanka, however, where he was educated at Royal College Colombo, winning the coveted Royal Crown for cricket and colours in water polo. He holds a degree in Physical Science from University of Colombo. Mubarak was initially spotted at a cricket training camp in Dambulla by former players Arjuna Ranatunga and Aravinda de Silva, and subsequently labeled one of the brightest future stars of Sri Lankan cricket.

Mubarak started his sporting career as a swimmer and then became a cricketer. He swam for Royal College and represented his alma-mater at national-level swimming competitions. Mubarak specialized in short-distance swimming and won the national championship in 50 meter butterfly stroke. In 2006–2007 Jehan swam for Sri Lanka National Swimming meet and after finishing his semi-final heat he opted out of the final event to participate in Sri Lanka national cricket team practice. Mubarak also led the Royal College Water Polo team during his time at Royal College.

Mubarak was involved in an accident on 22 April 2012, a head-on collision which killed a motorcyclist, when he was driving back from Wilpattu National Park; he was arrested but later acquitted.

== Domestic career ==
After being a prolific run scorer in school yard cricket, though only playing a handful of first class games, Mubarak was eliciting comparisons to West Indian cricket icon Brian Lara for not only his graceful batting style but also for his ability against spinners. He made his Twenty20 debut on 17 August 2004, for Colombo Cricket Club in the 2004 SLC Twenty20 Tournament.

In July 2009, Mubarak was selected to captain the Sri Lanka Board XI against India. In August 2009, he scored 160 for Sri Lanka A against Pakistan A and in September 2009 he captained and guided Sri Lankan domestic champions Wayamba to the Champions League in India.

== International career ==
=== Debut ===
In July 2002 he made his Test debut against Bangladesh, and in November 2002 he made his ODI debut against South Africa and participated in the 2003 World Cup hosted by South Africa.

After his debut Ranjit Fernando stated on air that Mubarak's batting was "poetry in motion" and that he should be given more responsibility in order to improve the professionalism of the Sri Lankan cricket team.

=== Decline ===
In June 2005 however, three years after his debut he had failed to live up to initial expectations and was looked over for selection and has been given limited opportunities since.

In February 2006, he was fined after showing dissent towards an umpire in an ODI against Bangladesh

=== Re-emergence ===
In August 2007 he was rushed into the Sri Lankan Twenty20 squad following the departures of Marvan Atapattu and Russel Arnold, following man-of-the-match performances against Bangladesh. He performed admirably during this tournament which included a 13-ball 46 against Kenya, where the team recorded highest ever twenty20 international team total by posting 260/6, which stood for 9 years until Australia beat the record.

In September 2007 Mubarak subsequently re-called back into the ODI squad and Sri Lankan Test team against England.

In September 2008 Mubarak performed well all-round against Hong-Kong playing for the Sri Lankan Development XI.

In May 2009 Mubarak was selected as one of the overseas players of Brothers Union Chittagong for their campaign in the Habib Group Port City Cricket League (PCL) tournament being held in Chittagong, Bangladesh between 2 and 10 May 2009.

=== Late career ===
Many commentators remarked that he had previously been treated unfairly and never given an extended run in the Sri Lankan team, and this along with the enormous burden placed on him in his youth was the main reason behind his lack of consistency. Cricket loving public feels he has been given more opportunities than others as he is from the same school as the Chief selector Asantha De Mel. Asantha De Mel was replaced by Aravinda De Silva in 2010.

Mubarak has also been touted as a future captain of Sri Lanka due to his handling of his team Wayamba and of the media during the Champions League in India.

In 2015, he was slated for a Test recall for his fielding abilities by Jonty Rhodes due to his long reach. Having scored a thousand runs in back-to-back domestic seasons Mubarak was recalled to the Test squad for the first time in almost eight years. He played in the third Test of the Pakistan series in Kumar Sangakkara's place and made a contribution of 35 batting with skipper Angelo Mathews in the second innings. But, Sri Lanka lost the match by 6 wickets.

== National records ==
Jehan Mubarak has the highest ever strike rate (353.84) in a T20I match for Sri Lanka, set when he made 46 not out off 13 balls against Kenya in the 2007 World T20.

== Commentator ==
Jehan Mubarak made his commentary debut during the test series between Sri Lanka and Bangladesh.

== See also ==
- List of Test cricketers born in non-Test playing nations
