= List of Sri Lanka Cricket Combined representative cricketers =

This is a list of cricket players who have played representative cricket for Sri Lanka Cricket Combined XI in Sri Lanka. Sri Lanka Cricket Combined XI was founded in 2010.

It includes players that have played at least one match, in senior First-Class, List A cricket, or Twenty20 matches. Practice matches are not included, unless they have officially been classified at First-class tour matches.

The Inter-Provincial Cricket Tournament is the premier domestic cricket competition in Sri Lanka. It was founded in 1990.

== First Class Players ==
Sri Lanka Cricket Combined XI is yet to play any first class cricket matches.

== List 'A' Players ==
All of the Players who have represented Sri Lanka Cricket Combined XI in List A cricket domestic one day competitions:

- 1. Dhammika Sudarshana
- 2. Dilruwan Perera
- 3. Mahela Udawatte
- 4. Indika de Saram
- 5. Chamara Silva
- 6. Jeevantha Kulatunga
- 7. Kumar Dharmasena
- 8. Rashan Peiris
- 9. Dilhara Lokuhettige
- 10. Chamila Gamage
- 11. Malinga Surappulige
- 12. Andri Berenger
- 13. Rumesh Buddika
- 14. Bhanuka Rajapaksa
- 15. Hans Fernando
- 16. Kithuruwan Vithanage
- 17. Ranesh Perera
- 18. Chathura Peiris
- 19. Maduka Liyanapathiranage
- 20. Arosh Janoda
- 21. Nilanka Premaratne
- 22. Dhanushka Gunathilleke
- 23. Demintha Dahanayake
- 24. Lihuru Gamage
- 25. Raju Gayashan
- 26. Charith Jayampathi

== Twenty20 Players ==
All of the Players who have represented Sri Lanka Cricket Combined XI in Twenty20 domestic competitions:

- 1. Achira Eranga
- 2. Hans Fernando
- 3. Bhanuka Rajapaksa
- 4. Kithuruwan Vithanage
- 5. Dhanushka Gunathilleke
- 6. Charith Jayampathi
- 7. Imesh Udayanga
- 8. Arosh Janoda
- 9. Chathura Peiris
- 10. Ranesh Perera
- 11. Maduka Liyanapathiranage
- 12. Rumesh Buddika
- 13. Demintha Dahanayake
- 14. Andri Berenger
- 15. Lihuru Gamage
- 16. Sanjaya Fernando
