= 2009–10 SLC Super Provincial Twenty20 =

- Administrator: Sri Lanka Cricket
- Cricket format: Twenty20
- Tournament format(s): Round-robin and Knockout
- Host: Sri Lanka
- Champions: Wayamba elevens (3rd title)
- Participants: 6
- Matches: 18
- Player of the series: Jeevantha Kulatunga
- Most runs: Dinesh Chandimal 320 (202 balls)
- Most wickets: Sachithra Senanayake 14 (28 overs, 152 runs)
- Official website: Cricinfo site

The 2009–10 SLC Super Provincial Twenty20 is the 3rd season of the official Twenty20 domestic cricket competition in Sri Lanka. Six teams in total, five representing four provinces of Sri Lanka and a Sri Lanka Cricket team participating in the competition. The competition began on 24 February 2010 when Ruhuna elevens played the Sri Lanka Cricket Combined XI at Dharmaraja College, Kandy.

This season comprised 15 regular matches, two semi finals and a grand final.

== Teams ==
Team name (Sponsored name)	Home ground(s)	Captain
Basnahira North elevens Western Province North	R. Premadasa Stadium	Thilina Kandamby
Basnahira South elevens Western Province South	Sinhalese Sports Club Ground	Chamara Silva
Kandurata elevens Central Province	Pallekele International Cricket Stadium	Kumar Sangakkara
Ruhuna elevens Southern Province	Galle International Stadium	Upul Tharanga
Sri Lanka Cricket Combined XI; Sri Lanka Cricket	Dharmaraja College Ground	Hans Fernando
Wayamba elevens North Western Province	Welagedara Stadium	Jehan Mubarak

== Rules and regulations ==
Points
Results	Points
Win	4 points
Tie	2 points
No Result _{(but play started)}	2-point
Loss	0 points

Teams received 4 points for a win, 2 for a tie or no result, and 0 for a loss. At the end of the regular matches the teams ranked two and three play each other in the preliminary final. The winner of the preliminary final earns the right to play the first placed team in the final at the home venue of the first placed team. In the event of several teams finishing with the same number of points, standings are determined by most wins, then net run rate (NRR). All finals were played at Tyronne Fernando Stadium.

== Standings and tournament progression ==
=== Standings ===
Team	Pld	W	T	L	NR	BP	Pts	NRR
Wayamba elevens (C)	5	5	0	0	0	1	21	+1.052
Ruhuna elevens (R)	5	3	0	2	0	0	12	+0.393
Kandurata elevens	5	3	0	2	0	1	11	+0.209
Basnahira South elevens	5	2	0	3	0	1	11	−0.422
Basnahira North elevens	5	2	0	3	0	1	9	+0.378
Sri Lanka Cricket Combined XI	5	0	0	5	0	0	0	−1.723

Full table on cricinfo
(C) = Eventual Champion; (R) = Runner-up.
Winner qualify for the 2010 Champions League Twenty20.

=== Tournament progression ===
	Group Matches					Knockout				
Team	1	2	3	4	5	SF	F			
Basnahira North	0	0	5	5	9					
Basnahira South	0	2	2	7	11	L				
Kandurata	4	6	11	11	11	L				
Ruhuna	4	8	8	12	12	W	L			
Sri Lanka Cricket Combined XI	0	0	0	0	0					
Wayamba	5	9	13	17	21	W	W			
Note: The total points at the end of each group match are listed.								Win	Loss	No result
Note: Click on the points (group matches)or W/L (Knockout) to see the summary for the match.								Team was eliminated before the league reached this stage.		

== Fixtures ==
=== Round 1 ===
24 February 2010
Scorecard

Sri Lanka Cricket Combined XI; 179/5 (20 overs)	v	Ruhuna; 185/1 (17.5 overs)
Hans Fernando 66 (50); Imesh Udayanga 1/35 (4 overs)		Upul Tharanga 83* (58); Tharanga Lakshitha 2/29 (4 overs)

Ruhuna won by 9 wickets
Dharmaraja College Ground
Umpires: Ranmore Martinesz and SH Sarathkumara

- Sri Lanka Cricket Combined XI, who chose to bat

24 February 2010
Scorecard

Basnahira South; 143/7 (20 overs)	v	Wayamba; 145/6 (15.3 overs)
Nuwan Zoysa 34 (23); Janaka Gunaratne 2/21 (4 overs)		Mahela Jayawardene 64 (31); Kaushal Lokuarachchi 2/23 (3 overs)

Wayamba won by 4 wickets
Pallekele International Cricket Stadium
Umpires: Gamini Dissanayake and Grashan Liyanage

- Wayamba, who chose to field

24 February 2010
Scorecard

Kandurata; 190/6 (20 overs)	v	Basnahira North; 180/8 (20 overs)
Tharanga Paranavitana 67 (46); Muttiah Muralitharan 2/26 (4 overs); Suraj Randiv 2/26 (4 overs)		Thilina Kandamby 36 (26); Chaminda Vaas 1/22 (3 overs)

Kandurata won by 10 runs
Pallekele International Cricket Stadium
Umpires: Lyndon Hannibal and Grashan Liyanage

- Kandurata, who chose to bat

=== Round 2 ===
25 February 2010
Scorecard

Ruhuna; 180/7 (20 overs)	v	Basnahira North; 153 (19.4 overs)
Dinesh Chandimal 75 (50); Kosala Kulasekara 4/26 (3 overs)		Dimuth Karunaratne 50 (39); Nuwan Kulasekara 2/33 (4 overs)

Ruhuna won by 27 runs
Pallekele International Cricket Stadium
Umpires: Gamini Dissanayake and SH Sarathkumara

- Basnahira North, who chose to field

25 February 2010
Scorecard

Sri Lanka Cricket Combined XI; 143/6 (20 overs)	v	Wayamba; 148/3 (18.3 overs)
Hans Fernando 54 (60); Demintha Dahanayake 2/12 (4 overs)		Jeevantha Kulatunga 38 (28); Isuru Udana 2/21 (4 overs)

Wayamba won by 7 wickets
Dharmaraja College Ground
Umpires: Lyndon Hannibal and Maurici Zilva

- Sri Lanka Cricket Combined XI, who chose to bat

25 February 2010
Scorecard

Kandurata; 163/9 (20 overs)	v	Basnahira South; 162/7 (20 overs)
Tharanga Paranavitana 57 (40); Dilhara Fernando 3/44 (4 overs)		Lahiru Thirimanne 34 (35); Janaka Gunaratne 3/23 (4 overs)

Kandurata won by 1 run
Pallekele International Cricket Stadium
Umpires: Gamini Dissanayake and Ranmore Martinesz

- Kandurata, who chose to bat
- the match was recorded as a no result, with each team getting two points

=== Round 3 ===
27 February 2010
Scorecard

Sri Lanka Cricket Combined XI; 139/9 (20 overs)	v	Kandurata; 140/2 (14.2 overs)
Dhanushka Gunathilleke 23 (29); Imesh Udayanga 1/17 (3 overs)		Kumar Sangakkara 51* (29); Chinthaka Jayasinghe 2/15 (3 overs)

Kandurata won by 8 wickets
Pallekele International Cricket Stadium
Umpires: Grashan Liyanage and Maurici Zilva

- Kandurata, who chose to field

27 February 2010
Scorecard

Ruhuna; 127 (19.5 overs)	v	Wayamba; 131/5 (18.1 overs)
Dinesh Chandimal 30 (23); Sachithra Senanayake 2/19 (4 overs)		Mahela Jayawardene 59 (40); Chanaka Welegedara 2/16 (3.5 overs)

Wayamba won by 5 wickets
Welagedara Stadium
Umpires: Asoka De Silva and Kumar Dharmasena

- Wayamba, who chose to field

27 February 2010
Scorecard

Basnahira North; 163/8 (20 overs)	v	Basnahira South; 109 (17 overs)
Thilina Kandamby 44 (33); Nuwan Kulasekara 3/13 (4 overs)		Chamara Silva 45 (38); Milinda Siriwardana 2/24 (4 overs)

Basnahira North won by 54 runs
Welagedara Stadium
Umpires: Asoka De Silva and Kumar Dharmasena

- Basnahira North, who chose to bat

=== Round 4 ===
28 February 2010
Scorecard

Basnahira North; 160/8 (20 overs)	v	Wayamba; 162/6 (20 overs)
Kaushal Silva 47 (38); Gayan Wijekoon 1/4 (1 over)		Jehan Mubarak 62* (49); Jehan Mubarak 2/23 (4 overs)

Wayamba won by 4 wickets
Welagedara Stadium
Umpires: Asoka De Silva and Kumar Dharmasena

- Basnahira North, who chose to bat

28 February 2010
Scorecard

Sri Lanka Cricket Combined XI; 130 (19.2 overs)	v	Basnahira South; 131/4 (14.2 overs)
Bhanuka Rajapaksa 58 (35); Charith Jayampathi 2/28 (3 overs)		Dilruwan Perera 40 (38); Milinda Siriwardana 3/5 (1.2 overs)

Basnahira South won by 6 wickets
Pallekele International Cricket Stadium
Umpires: Grashan Liyanage and Maurici Zilva

- Sri Lanka Cricket Combined XI, who chose to bat

28 February 2010
Scorecard

Kandurata; 164/6 (20 overs)	v	Ruhuna; 168/6 (18.5 overs)
Thilan Samaraweera 67 (43); Chinthaka Jayasinghe 2/27 (3 overs)		Dinesh Chandimal 65 (42); Sachithra Senanayake 2/24 (4 overs)

Ruhuna won by 4 wickets
Welagedara Stadium
Umpires: Asoka De Silva and Kumar Dharmasena

- Kandurata, who chose to bat

=== Round 5 ===
4 March 2010
Scorecard

Sri Lanka Cricket Combined XI; 128/6 (20 overs)	v	Basnahira North; 132/2 (17.4 overs)
Kithuruwan Vithanage 24 (18); Demintha Dahanayake 2/14 (3 overs)		Angelo Mathews 60* (44); Sachithra Serasinghe 2/17 (4 overs)

Basnahira North won by 8 wickets
Colts Cricket Club Ground
Umpires: Gamini Dissanayake and Lyndon Hannibal

- Sri Lanka Cricket Combined XI, who chose to bat

4 March 2010
Scorecard

Basnahira South; 158/6 (20 overs)	v	Ruhuna; 151 (19.2 overs)
Lahiru Thirimanne 42 (33); Janaka Gunaratne 4/21 (4 overs)		Sanath Jayasuriya 25 (29); Sanath Jayasuriya 2/27 (4 overs)

Basnahira South won by 7 runs
Galle International Stadium
Umpires: Ranmore Martinesz and Tyron Wijewardene

- Basnahira South, who chose to bat

4 March 2010
Scorecard

Wayamba; 181/4 (20 overs)	v	Kandurata; 154/7 (20 overs)
Jeevantha Kulatunga 104* (62); Thissara Perera 1/7 (2 overs)		Kaushalya Weeraratne 60 (39); Chaminda Vidanapathirana 1/26 (4 overs)

Wayamba won by 27 runs
Galle International Stadium
Umpires: SH Sarathkumara and Tyron Wijewardene

- Wayamba, who chose to bat

== Knockout stage ==
Semi-finals
6 March – Tyronne Fernando Stadium
Basnahira South	117 (18.4 overs)
Wayamba	122/1 (13.3 overs)
6 March – Tyronne Fernando Stadium
Kandurata	102 (18.3 overs)
Ruhuna	106/3 (9.4 overs)

Final
7 March – Tyronne Fernando Stadium
Wayamba	208/8 (20 overs)
Ruhuna	113 (13.2 overs)

=== Semi Final 1 ===
6 March 2010
Scorecard

Basnahira South; 117 (18.4 overs)	v	Wayamba; 122/1 (13.3 overs)
Nuwan Zoysa 41 (29); Janaka Gunaratne 18 (18); Malinga Bandara 1/34 (4 overs); Tillakaratne Dilshan 0/5 (1 over)		Mahela Jayawardene 58 (32); Jeevantha Kulatunga 48* (37); Thissara Perera 3/18 (4 overs); Chanaka Welegedara 3/19 (3.4 overs)

Wayamba won by 9 wickets
Tyronne Fernando Stadium
Umpires: Grashan Liyanage and Tyron Wijewardene

- Wayamba, who chose to field.

=== Semi Final 2 ===
6 March 2010
Scorecard

Kandurata; 102 (18.3 overs)	v	Ruhuna; 106/3 (9.4 overs)
Kaushalya Weeraratne 29* (31); Chamara Kapugedera 26 (25); Muttiah Muralitharan 2/12 (2 overs); Dilhara Fernando 1/16 (2 overs)		Sanath Jayasuriya 35 (19); Dinesh Chandimal 35 (21); Sachithra Senanayake 2/9 (4 overs); Sajeewa Weerakoon 2/16 (3 overs)

Ruhuna won by 7 wickets
Tyronne Fernando Stadium
Umpires: Ranmore Martinesz and Maurici Zilva

- Ruhuna, who chose to field.

=== Final ===
7 March 2010
Scorecard

Wayamba; 208/8 (20 overs)	v	Ruhuna; 113 (13.2 overs)
Mahela Jayawardene 91 (49); Kushal Janith Perera 34 (21); Ajantha Mendis 4/9 (3.2 overs); Thissara Perera 2/7 (1 over)		Dinesh Chandimal 64 (33); Indika de Saram 19 (11); Sachithra Senanayake 3/25 (4 overs); Sanath Jayasuriya 3/44 (overs)

Wayamba won by 95 runs
Tyronne Fernando Stadium
Umpires: Asoka De Silva and Kumar Dharmasena

- Ruhuna, who chose to field.

== Statistics ==
=== Awards ===
- Man of the Tournament – Jeevantha Kulatunga: 277 runs (182 balls), highest score of 104* (62 balls) (Wayamba)
- Batsman of the Tournament – Dinesh Chandimal: 320 runs (202 balls), highest score of 75 (50 balls) (Ruhuna)
- Bowler of the Tournament – Janaka Gunaratne: 12 wickets (19 overs), best innings bowling of 4/21 (4 overs) (Basnahira South)

=== Most Runs ===
The top five highest run scorers (total runs) in the season are included in this table.

Player	Team	Runs	Inns	Avg	S/R	HS	100s	50s
Dinesh Chandimal	Ruhuna	320	7	53.33	158.41	75	0	3
Mahela Jayawardene	Wayamba	293	6	48.83	168.39	91	0	4
Jeevantha Kulatunga	Wayamba	277	6	69.25	152.19	104*	1	1
Tharanga Paranavitana	Kandurata	196	6	32.66	129.80	67	0	3
Jehan Mubarak	Wayamba	174	6	43.50	119.17	62*	0	1

Last Updated 11 March 2010.

=== Most Wickets ===
The following table contains the five leading wicket-takers of the season.

Player	Team	Wkts	Mts	Ave	S/R	Econ	BBI
Sachithra Senanayake	Ruhuna	14	7	10.85	12.0	5.42	3/25
Janaka Gunaratne	Basnahira South	12	6	10.83	9.5	6.84	4/21
Thissara Perera	Wayamba	9	7	13.11	11.3	6.94	3/18
Sajeewa Weerakoon	Ruhuna	9	7	14.88	15.3	5.82	2/16
Isuru Udana	Wayamba	9	7	20.55	16.6	7.40	2/21

Last Updated 11 March 2010.

=== Highest Team Totals ===
The following table lists the six highest team scores during this season.

Team	Total	Opponent	Ground
Wayamba	208/8	Ruhuna	Moratuwa
Kandurata	190/6	Basnahira North	Pallekele
Ruhuna	185/1	Sri Lanka Cricket Combined XI	Kandy
Wayamba	181/4	Kandurata	Galle
Basnahira North	180/8	Kandurata	Pallekele
Ruhuna	180/7	Basnahira North	Pallekele

Last Updated 11 March 2010.

=== Highest Scores ===
This table contains the top five highest scores of the season made by a batsman in a single innings.

Player	Team	Score	Balls	4s	6s	Opponent	Ground
Jeevantha Kulatunga	Wayamba	104*	62	15	0	Kandurata	Galle
Mahela Jayawardene	Wayamba	91	49	10	6	Ruhuna	Moratuwa
Upul Tharanga	Ruhuna	83*	58	9	3	Sri Lanka Cricket Combined XI	Kandy
Dinesh Chandimal	Ruhuna	75	50	5	4	Basnahira North	Pallekele
Tharanga Paranavitana	Kandurata	67	46	8	2	Basnahira North	Pallekele

Last Updated 11 March 2010.

=== Best Bowling Figures in an innings ===
This table lists the top five players with the best bowling figures in an innings.

Player	Team	Overs	Figures	Opponent	Ground
Ajantha Mendis	Wayamba	3.2	4/9	Ruhuna	Moratuwa
Janaka Gunaratne	Basnahira South	4	4/21	Ruhuna	Galle
Kosala Kulasekara	Ruhuna	3	4/26	Basnahira North	Pallekele
Milinda Siriwardana	Basnahira South	1.2	3/5	Sri Lanka Cricket Combined XI	Pallekele
Nuwan Kulasekara	Basnahira North	4	3/13	Basnahira South	Kurunegala

Last Updated 11 March 2010.
