= 2008–09 SLC Super Provincial Twenty20 =

- Administrator: Sri Lanka Cricket
- Cricket format: Twenty20
- Tournament format(s): Round-robin and Knockout
- Host: Sri Lanka
- Champions: Wayamba elevens (2nd title)
- Participants: 6
- Matches: 18
- Player of the series: Isuru Udana
- Most runs: Indika de Saram 254 (182)
- Most wickets: Isuru Udana 16 (21.2 overs, 130 runs)
- Official website: Cricinfo site

The 2008–09 SLC Super Provincial Twenty20 is the 2nd season of the official Twenty20 domestic cricket competition in Sri Lanka. Six teams in total, five representing four provinces of Sri Lanka and a Sri Lanka Schools XI team participating in the competition. The competition began on 25 March 2009when Ruhuna elevens played the Sri Lanka Schools XI at Moors Sports Club Ground, Colombo.

This season comprised 15 regular matches, two semi finals and a grand final.

== Teams ==
Team name (Sponsored name)	Home ground(s)	Captain
Basnahira North elevens Western Province North	R. Premadasa Stadium	Chaminda Vaas
Basnahira South elevens Western Province South	Sinhalese Sports Club Ground	Tillakaratne Dilshan
Kandurata elevens Central Province	Pallekele International Cricket Stadium	Kumar Sangakkara
Ruhuna elevens Southern Province	Galle International Stadium	Sanath Jayasuriya
Sri Lanka Schools XI; Sri Lankan Schools		Dinesh Chandimal
Wayamba elevens North Western Province	Welagedara Stadium	Jehan Mubarak

== Rules and regulations ==
Points
Results	Points
Win	4 points
Tie	2 points
No Result _{(but play started)}	2 point
Loss	0 points

Teams received 4 points for a win, 2 for a tie or no result, and 0 for a loss. At the end of the regular matches the teams ranked two and three play each other in the preliminary final. The winner of the preliminary final earns the right to play the first placed team in the final at the home venue of the first placed team. In the event of several teams finishing with the same number of points, standings are determined by most wins, then net run rate (NRR). All finals were played at Sinhalese Sports Club Ground.

== Standings and tournament progression ==
=== Standings ===
Team	Pts	Pld	W	T	L	NR	NRR
Basnahira South elevens (R)	21	5	5	0	0	0	+1.372
Wayamba elevens (C)	18	5	4	0	1	0	+0.739
Kandurata elevens	13	5	3	0	2	0	+0.097
Ruhuna elevens	10	5	2	0	3	0	+0.739
Basnahira North elevens	4	5	1	0	4	0	−1.132
Sri Lanka Schools XI	0	5	0	0	5	0	−1.946

Full table on cricinfo
(C) = Eventual Champion; (R) = Runner-up.
Winner qualify for the 2009 Champions League Twenty20.

=== Tournament progression ===
	Group Matches					Knockout				
Team	1	2	3	4	5	SF	F			
Basnahira North	0	0	0	0	4					
Basnahira South	5	9	13	17	21	W	L			
Kandurata	4	4	9	13	13	L				
Ruhuna	5	10	10	10	10	NR				
Sri Lanka Schools XI	0	0	0	0	0					
Wayamba	0	5	9	13	18	NR	W			
Note: The total points at the end of each group match are listed.								Win	Loss	No result
Note: Click on the points (group matches)or W/L (Knockout) to see the summary for the match.								Team was eliminated before the league reached this stage.		

== Fixtures ==
=== Round 1 ===
25 March 2009
Scorecard

Sri Lanka Schools XI; 73 (17 overs)	v	Ruhuna; 74/2 (10.5 overs)
Bhanuka Rajapaksa 26 (28); Lahiru Jayarathne 1/15 (3 overs)		Indika de Saram 31 (20); Sujeewa de Silva 4/16 (3 overs)

Ruhuna won by 8 wickets
Moors Sports Club Ground
Umpires: Gamini Dissanayake and Gamini Silva

- Ruhuna, who chose to field

25 March 2009
Scorecard

Basnahira South; 169/6 (20 overs)	v	Wayamba; 119 (18.4 overs)
Chamara Silva 48* (39); Malinga Bandara 3/27 (4 overs)		Kaushal Lokuarachchi 42 (26); Chanaka Welegedara 3/38 (4 overs)

Basnahira South won by 50 runs
Sinhalese Sports Club Ground
Umpires: Asoka De Silva and Rohitha Kottahachchi

- Wayamba, who chose to field

25 March 2009
Scorecard

Basnahira North; 121/9 (20 overs)	v	Kandurata; 122/4 (16.3 overs)
Bathiya Perera 43 (42); Nuwan Kulasekara 2/26 (4 overs)		Chamara Kapugedera 35* (34); Muttiah Muralitharan 4/16 (4 overs)

Kandurata won by 6 wickets
Sinhalese Sports Club Ground
Umpires: Asoka De Silva and Jagath Nandakumar

- Basnahira North, who chose to bat

=== Round 2 ===
26 March 2009
Scorecard

Basnahira South; 168/9 (20 overs)	v	Kandurata; 135 (17.3 overs)
Milinda Siriwardana 39 (26); Chinthaka Perera 3/23 (4 overs)		Chinthaka Jayasinghe 34 (23); Dilhara Fernando 2/27 (4 overs)

Basnahira South won by 33 runs
Paikiasothy Saravanamuttu Stadium
Umpires: Gamini Dissanayake and Jagath Nandakumar

- Kandurata, who chose to field

26 March 2009
Scorecard

Sri Lanka Schools XI; 120/8 (20 overs)	v	Wayamba; 121/6 (15.5 overs)
Buwaneka Ekanayake 38 (37); Lahiru Jayarathne 2/26 (4 overs)		Jehan Mubarak 60* (42); Thissara Perera 3/17 (4 overs)

Wayamba won by 4 wickets
Moors Sports Club Ground
Umpires: Sagara Gallage and Ranmore Martinesz

- Schools Invitation XI, who chose to bat

26 March 2009
Scorecard

Ruhuna; 203/6 (20 overs)	v	Basnahira North; 153 (19.1 overs)
Indika de Saram 94 (43); Tharanga Lakshitha 4/28 (4 overs)		Kaushal Silva 60 (47); Nuwan Pradeep 1/28 (4 overs)

Ruhuna won by 51 runs
Moors Sports Club Ground
Umpires: Deepal Gunawardene and Ranmore Martinesz

- Basnahira North, who chose to field

=== Round 3 ===
28 March 2009
Scorecard

Sri Lanka Schools XI; 101/8 (20 overs)	v	Kandurata elevens 102/4 (12.5 overs)
Chaturanga de Silva 26 (20); Imesh Udayanga 2/15 (3 overs)		Tharanga Paranavitana 36 (23); Tharanga Paranavitana 1/3 (1 over)

Kandurata won by 6 wickets
Police Park Ground
Umpires: Asoka De Silva and SH Sarathkumara

- Kandurata, who chose to field

28 March 2009
Scorecard

Ruhuna elevens 127 (18.4 overs)	v	Wayamba elevens 130/5 (17.1 overs)
Sanath Jayasuriya 45 (23); Sanath Jayasuriya 1/23 (4 overs)		Mahela Udawatte 51 (36); Ajantha Mendis 3/14 (3.4 overs)

Wayamba won by 5 wickets
Sinhalese Sports Club Ground
Umpires: Deepal Gunawardene and Maurici Zilva

- Wayamba, who chose to field

28 March 2009
Scorecard

Basnahira South elevens 158/8 (20 overs)	v	Basnahira North elevens 145/8 (20 overs)
Lahiru Thirimanne 70 (46); Malinga Bandara 3/18 (4 overs)		Amal Athulathmudali 35 (15); Angelo Mathews 3/22 (4 overs)

Basnahira South won by 13 runs
Sinhalese Sports Club Ground
Umpires: Deepal Gunawardene and Lalith Nandana

- Basnahira South, who chose to bat

=== Round 4 ===
29 March 2009
Scorecard

Wayamba elevens 156/5 (20 overs)	v	Basnahira North elevens 127 (16.1 overs)
Jehan Mubarak 55 (39); Ajantha Mendis 2/17 (3 overs)		Amal Athulathmudali 32 (21); Nuwan Pradeep 2/40 (4 overs)

Wayamba won by 29 runs
Colts Cricket Club Ground
Umpires: Sena Nandiweera and Gamini Silva

- Basnahira North, who chose to field

29 March 2009
Scorecard

Basnahira South elevens 172/9 (20 overs)	v	Sri Lanka Schools XI; 145/7 (20 overs)
Chamara Silva 56 (34); Suranga Lakmal 4/19 (4 overs)		Bhanuka Rajapaksa 58 (44); Chathura Peiris 3/18 (4 overs)

Basnahira South won by 27 runs
Moors Sports Club Ground
Umpires: Atula Senanayake and Tyron Wijewardene

- Schools Invitation XI, who chose to field

29 March 2009
Scorecard

Kandurata elevens 119 (15.3 overs)	v	Ruhuna elevens 107 (19 overs)
Chinthaka Jayasinghe 47 (26); Dilhara Fernando 4/14 (4 overs)		Indika de Saram 53 (51); Tharanga Lakshitha 5/16 (3.3 overs)

Kandurata won by 12 runs
Colts Cricket Club Ground
Umpires: Rohitha Kottahachchi and Sena Nandiweera

- Kandurata, who chose to bat

=== Round 5 ===
31 March 2009
Scorecard

Sri Lanka Schools XI; 125/8 (20 overs)	v	Basnahira North elevens 129/8 (19.2 overs)
Dinesh Chandimal 45 (28); Vimukthi Perera 3/21 (4 overs)		Angelo Mathews 25 (29); Muthumudalige Pushpakumara 4/20 (4 overs)

Basnahira North won by 2 wickets
Paikiasothy Saravanamuttu Stadium
Umpires: SH Sarathkumara and Tyron Wijewardene

- Schools Invitation XI, who chose to bat

31 March 2009
Scorecard

Ruhuna elevens 158/9 (20 overs)	v	Basnahira South elevens 161/6 (18.4 overs)
Indika de Saram 32 (27); Sajeewa Weerakoon 1/13 (4 overs)		Hasantha Fernando 44 (31); Suranga Lakmal 2/29 (4 overs)

Basnahira South won by 4 wickets
Sinhalese Sports Club Ground
Umpires: Sagara Gallage and Sena Nandiweera

- Ruhuna, who chose to bat

31 March 2009
Scorecard

Kandurata elevens 78 (17.2 overs)	v	Wayamba elevens 82/4 (14.3 overs)
Suresh Perera 25* (31); Chaminda Vidanapathirana 2/29 (4 overs)		Jeevantha Kulatunga 30 (24); Isuru Udana 3/6 (2.2 overs)

Wayamba won by 6 wickets
Sinhalese Sports Club Ground
Umpires: Sagara Gallage and Ranmore Martinesz

- Kandurata, who chose to bat

== Knockout stage ==
Semi-finals
4 April – Sinhalese Sports Club Ground
Basnahira South	137/9 (20 overs)
Kandurata	122/8 (20 overs)
4 April – Sinhalese Sports Club Ground
Ruhuna	88/7 (15 overs)
Wayamba	Wayamba won bowl-out 3–2

Final
5 April – Sinhalese Sports Club Ground
Basnahira South	144 (19.1 overs)
Wayamba	149/5 (19 overs)

=== Semi Final 1 ===
4 April 2009
Scorecard

Basnahira South; 137/9 (20 overs)	v	Kandurata; 122/8 (20 overs)
Chamara Silva 43 (33); Malinga Bandara 31 (23); Chinthaka Perera 4/19 (4 overs); Dilruwan Perera 1/11 (2 overs)		Tharanga Paranavitana 27 (21); Chamara Kapugedera 27 (27); Chinthaka Jayasinghe 2/26 (4 overs); Thilan Thushara 2/33 (4 overs)

Basnahira South won by 15 runs
Sinhalese Sports Club Ground
Umpires: Deepal Gunawardene and Tyron Wijewardene

- Kandurata, who chose to field

=== Semi Final 2 ===
4 April 2009
Scorecard

Ruhuna; 88/7 (15 overs)	v	Wayamba
Sanath Jayasuriya 26 (18); Indika de Saram 22 (25)		Isuru Udana 2/7 (2 overs); Kaushal Lokuarachchi 2/16 (4 overs)

No result
Sinhalese Sports Club Ground
Umpires: SH Sarathkumara and Gamini Silva

- Ruhuna, who chose to bat
- Wayamba won bowl-out 3–2

=== Final ===
5 April 2009
Scorecard

Basnahira South; 144 (19.1 overs)	v	Wayamba; 149/5 (19 overs)
Tillakaratne Dilshan 66 (49); Chamara Silva 41 (27); Himesh Silva 2/18 (3 overs); Chinthaka Perera 1/32 (3 overs)		Jehan Mubarak 32 (35); Kaushal Lokuarachchi 29 (25); Isuru Udana 4/31 (4 overs); Thissara Perera 1/18 (3.1 overs)

Wayamba won by 5 wickets
Sinhalese Sports Club Ground
Umpires: Ranmore Martinesz and Jagath Nandakumar
Player of the match: Isuru Udana

- Basnahira South, who chose to bat

== Statistics ==
=== Most Runs ===
The top five highest run scorers (total runs) in the season are included in this table.

Player	Team	Runs	Inns	Avg	S/R	HS	100s	50s
Indika de Saram	Ruhuna	254	6	50.80	139.56	94	0	2
Chamara Silva	Basnahira South	254	7	50.80	128.93	56	0	1
Jehan Mubarak	Wayamba	163	5	40.75	118.97	60*	0	2
Chinthaka Jayasinghe	Kandurata	157	6	39.25	142.72	47	0	0
Tillakaratne Dilshan	Basnahira South	148	7	21.14	129.82	66	0	1

Last Updated 31 March 2010.

=== Most Wickets ===
The following table contains the five leading wicket-takers of the season.

Player	Team	Wkts	Mts	Ave	S/R	Econ	BBI
Isuru Udana	Wayamba	16	7	8.12	8.0	6.09	4/31
Chinthaka Perera	Basnahira South	12	7	17.50	13.0	8.07	4/19
Tharanga Lakshitha	Ruhuna	11	6	9.63	8.4	6.83	5/16
Suranga Lakmal	Basnahira South	11	7	15.81	14.4	6.56	3/30
Malinga Bandara	Basnahira South	10	7	16.90	15.6	6.50	3/18

Last Updated 31 March 2010.

=== Highest Team Totals ===
The following table lists the six highest team scores during this season.

Team	Total	Opponent	Ground
Ruhuna	203/6	Basnahira North	Moors
Basnahira South	172/9	Sri Lanka Schools XI	Moors
Basnahira South	169/6	Sri Lanka Schools XI	SSC
Basnahira South	168/9	Wayamba	PSS
Basnahira South	161/6	Kandurata	SSC
Basnahira South	158/8	Basnahira North	SSC

Last Updated 31 March 2010.

=== Highest Scores ===
This table contains the top five highest scores of the season made by a batsman in a single innings.

Player	Team	Score	Balls	4s	6s	Opponent	Ground
Indika de Saram	Ruhuna	94	43	4	9	Basnahira North	Moors
Lahiru Thirimanne	Basnahira South	70	46	6	2	Basnahira North	SSC
Tillakaratne Dilshan	Basnahira South	66	49	4	3	Wayamba	SSC
Jehan Mubarak	Wayamba	60*	42	6	2	Sri Lanka Schools XI	Moors
Kaushal Silva	Basnahira North	60	47	9	0	Ruhuna	Moors

Last Updated 31 March 2010.

=== Best Bowling Figures in an innings ===
This table lists the top five players with the best bowling figures in an innings.

Player	Team	Overs	Figures	Opponent	Ground
Tharanga Lakshitha	Ruhuna	3.3	5/16	Kandurata	Colts
Dilhara Fernando	Kandurata	4	4/14	Ruhuna	Colts
Sujeewa de Silva	Ruhuna	3	4/16	Sri Lanka Schools XI	Moors
Muttiah Muralitharan	Kandurata	4	4/16	Basnahira North	SSC
Chinthaka Perera	Basnahira South	4	4/19	Kandurata	SSC

Last Updated 31 March 2010.
