= Hong Kong cricket team against Nepal in Sri Lanka in 2014–15 =

| | Hong Kong | Nepal |
- Dates: 9 November – 3 December 2014
| Captains | Jamie Atkinson | Paras Khadka |

Twenty20 International series
- Results: Hong Kong won the 4-match series 1–0
| Most runs | 21 (Aizaz Khan, Anas Khan) | 40 (Sompal Kami) |
| Most wickets | 2 (Aizaz Khan, Irfan Ahmed, Nadeem Ahmed, Tanwir Afzal) | 2 (Shakti Gauchan, Sagar Pun) |

The Hong Kong and Nepal national cricket teams toured Sri Lanka from 9 November to 3 December 2014. The series, hosted by Sri Lanka Cricket, was part of a program organized by the Asian Cricket Council (ACC) to benefit non-Test-playing ACC members.

The series was initially planned to feature three Twenty20 Internationals and a List A match between the two teams, along with two three-day matches against a Sri Lanka Cricket XI, with the matches played in Dambulla and Kurunegala. However, due to regular rain in Dambulla, the T20I series was shortened and rescheduled to one match, and the List A match moved a day earlier, with both matches being scheduled in Colombo. Hong Kong won the T20I match by 2 wickets.

== Squads ==
| Hong Kong | Nepal |
|---|---|
| Jamie Atkinson (c), (wk); Waqas Barkat (vc); Tanwir Afzal; Irfan Ahmed; Nadeem Ahmed; Haseeb Amjad; Babar Hayat; Aizaz Khan; Anas Khan; Muhammad Khan; Waqas Khan; Ehsan Nawaz; Niraj Patwari; Kinchit Shah; Ankur Vasishta | Paras Khadka (c); Gyanendra Malla (vc); Pradeep Airee; Binod Bhandari (wk); Amrit Bhattarai; Naresh Budhayer; Shakti Gauchan; Sompal Kami; Bhuwan Karki; Karan KC; Subash Khakurel (wk); Anil Mandal; Rajesh Pulami; Sagar Pun; Basanta Regmi |

== Tour matches ==
=== Three-day matches ===
9–11 November 2014
Scorecard

| Nepal | v | (Sri Lanka) SLC XI |
| 187 (56.1 overs); Paras Khadka 59 (110); Mohamed Shiraz 3/28 (11.1 overs) | | 347 (97.3 overs); Minod Bhanuka 113 (133); Sompal Kami 5/64 (16.3 overs) |
| 211 (70.2 overs); Rajesh Pulami 95 (173); Chamikara Edirisinghe 6/84 (28.2 overs) | | 138/8d (44.2 overs); Gayan Maneeshan 63 (73); Sompal Kami 3/21 (7.2 overs) |

SLC XI won by 87 runs
Welagedara Stadium, Kurunegala
Player of the match: Sompal Kami (Nep)

- Nepal won the toss and chose to field

14–16 November 2014
Scorecard

| Nepal | v | (Sri Lanka) SLC XI |
| 193 (59.1 overs); Subash Khakurel 55 (101); Prabath Jayasuriya 8/68 (20.1 overs) | | 162 (48.2 overs); Lahiru Jayaratne 64 (95); Sompal Kami 6/48 (14.2 overs) |
| | | 94 (29.5 overs); Nuwan Liyanapathirana 31* (38); Karan KC 5/21 (7.5 overs) |

Match Drawn
Rangiri Dambulla International Stadium, Dambulla
Umpires: Chandrajith Danasinghe and Tabarak Dar
Player of the match: Sompal Kami (Nep)

- Nepal won the toss and chose to field
- Rain interrupted the Nepal's second innings

26–28 November 2014

| Hong Kong | v | (Sri Lanka) SLC XI |

Match Abandoned
Welagedara Stadium, Kurunegala

- Match was canceled due to the death of Australian Cricketer Phillip Hughes.

1–3 December 2014

| Hong Kong | v | (Sri Lanka) SLC XI |

Rangiri Dambulla International Stadium, Dambulla

== T20I series ==
=== 1st T20I ===
19 November 2014
11:00 am
Scorecard

| Hong Kong | v | Nepal |

No result
Rangiri Dambulla International Stadium, Dambulla

- Match abandoned without a ball bowled.
- The match was initially delayed due to a wet outfield, before being called off by the umpires. The match has been rescheduled for 21 November.

=== 2nd T20I ===
20 November 2014
11:00 am
Scorecard

| Hong Kong | v | Nepal |

No result
Rangiri Dambulla International Stadium, Dambulla

- Match abandoned without a ball bowled.

=== 2nd T20I (re-scheduled) ===
21 November 2014
11:00 am
Scorecard

| Hong Kong | v | Nepal |

No result
Rangiri Dambulla International Stadium, Dambulla

- Match abandoned without a ball bowled.
- Re-scheduled

=== 3rd T20I ===
22 November 2014
02:00 pm (D/N)
Scorecard

| Hong Kong | v | Nepal |

Cancelled
Rangiri Dambulla International Stadium, Dambulla

== List A series ==
=== Only List A ===
23 November 2014

| Hong Kong | v | Nepal |

No result
Colombo

- Match abandoned without a ball bowled.
- Firstly, scheduled on 24 November in Welagedara Stadium, Kurunegala.

== T20I series (rescheduled) ==
=== Only T20I ===
24 November 2014
10:00
Scorecard

| Nepal; 72 (20 overs) | v | Hong Kong; 73/8 (19.5 overs) |
| Sompal Kami 40 (31); Aizaz Khan 2/4 (4.0 overs) | | Anas Khan 21* (28); Shakti Gauchan 2/10 (4 overs) |

Hong Kong won by 2 wickets
Paikiasothy Saravanamuttu Stadium, Colombo
Umpires: Ruchira Palliyaguru (Sri Lanka) and Raveendra Wimalasiri (Sri Lanka)
Player of the match: Aizaz Khan (Hong Kong)

- Hong Kong won the toss and elected to field.
- Anas Khan, Kinchit Shah & Waqas Khan (HK) and Amrit Bhattarai & Rajesh Pulami (Nep) all made their T20I debuts.
- Sompal Kami made 40 runs from 31 balls, which is a record for highest run scored by the 10th batsmen in a T20I match.
