= Rajesh Pulami =

Nepalese cricketer (born 1992)

Personal information
- Full name: Rajesh Pulami Magar
- Born: 27 August 1992 (age 34); Sarlahi, Nepal
- Batting: Right-handed
- Bowling: Leg break, googly
- Role: Batsman

International information
- National side: Nepal (2014–2015)
- T20I debut (cap 13): 24 November 2014 v Hong Kong
- Last T20I: 17 July 2015 v Papua New Guinea
- T20I shirt no.: 21

Domestic team information
- Years: Team
- 2013–2015: Nepal Army (National League)
- 2014–2014: Colors X-Factors (NPL)
- 2015–2015: Pentagon (SPA Cup)
- 2013–2013: Marylebone Cricket Club
- 2015–2015: Kurunegala Sports Club

Career statistics
Competition	T20I	LA	T20
Matches	6	3	7
Runs scored	52	10	56
Batting average	8.66	5.00	8.00
100s/50s	0/0	0/0	0/0
Top score	25	9	25
Catches/stumpings	0/–	0/–	0/–
- Source: CricketArchive, 29 September 2021

Rajesh Pulami Magar (Nepali: राजेश पुलामी मगर) (born 27 August 1992) is a Nepalese cricketer. Rajesh is a right-handed batsman and a leg break googly bowler. He made his debut for Nepal against Hong Kong in November 2014.

He represents the Nepal Army Club of the National League, Colors X-Factors of the Nepal Premier League and Pentagon International College, which plays in the SPA Cup.

== Playing career ==
Rajesh has represented Nepal national under-19 cricket team in the 2011 ACC Under-19 Elite Cup, 2012 ICC Under-19 World Cup and several other tournaments. He also took part in 2011 ICC Under-19 World Cup Qualifier where he scored 188 runs at an average of 23.50, including 91 runs against Papua New Guinea U-19s. In 2012 ACC Under-19 Asia Cup, he scored 79 runs in 3 innings at an average of 26.33 and strike rate of 87.77.

In 2013, Pulami, along with another Nepalese youngster Naresh Budhayer, was selected by Marylebone Cricket Club (MCC) to train in its special youth program in England. He completed the scholarship programme that provided batting training and match exposure.

He made his Twenty20 International debut for Nepal playing against Hong Kong in the Sri Lanka Tour in November 2014 where he also played two three-day matches against Sri Lanka Cricket Combined XI.

In February 2015, he went Sri Lanka after being recruited by Kurunegala Sports Club to play in the Emerging Trophy Tournament, three-day cricket tournament.

He made his List A debut in the 2015–17 ICC World Cricket League Championship on 29 July 2015 against Scotland.
