= Anas Khan =

Hong Kong cricketer

Personal information
- Full name: Anas Khan
- Born: 26 February 1993 (age 33); Pakistan
- Batting: Left-handed
- Bowling: Slow left-arm orthodox
- Role: All-rounder

International information
- National side: Hong Kong
- T20I debut (cap 14): 24 November 2014 v Nepal
- Last T20I: 29 February 2024 v Qatar

Career statistics
Competition	T20I
Matches	1
Runs scored	21
Batting average	–
100s/50s	0/0
Top score	21*
Catches/stumpings	0/–
- Source: Cricinfo, 24 November 2014

Anas Khan (born 26 February 1993) is a Hong Kong international cricketer who made his Twenty20 International debut for the national side in November 2014.

Born in Pakistan, he was first selected in Hong Kong's national squad for its tour of Sri Lanka during the 2014–15 season, during which it was to play four T20Is against Nepal in Dambulla as part of a program to encourage the development of cricket in non-Test-playing members of the Asian Cricket Council. Although four T20Is were originally planned, continuous rain in Dambulla meant no play was possible, and only one match was eventually played, rescheduled to Colombo. Anas, a left-arm orthodox spinner and competent lower-order batsman, made his debut in this game. He did not bowl on debut, but was involved in a run out with wicket-keeper Jamie Atkinson. Nepal were bowled out for 72, and Hong Kong were at one stage 5/21 in reply. Anas, batting seventh, featured in two 24-run partnerships, with Aizaz Khan (21) for the sixth wicket and with Tanwir Afzal (9) for the eighth wicket. He finished unbeaten on 21 runs, helping Hong Kong win by two wickets.
