= Champions League 2009 =

Champions League 2009 may refer to:

- 2009 Champions League Twenty20
- AFC Champions League 2009
- CAF Champions League 2009
- The UEFA Champions League:
  - 2008–09 UEFA Champions League
  - 2009–10 UEFA Champions League
- CONCACAF Champions League:
  - 2009–10 CONCACAF Champions League
  - 2008–09 CONCACAF Champions League
