= Kasim Tuet =

- Traditional Chinese: 脫維善
- Simplified Chinese: 脱维善
Transcriptions
Standard Mandarin
- Hanyu Pinyin: Tuō Wéishàn
Yue: Cantonese
- Yale Romanization: Tyut Wàihsihn
- Jyutping: tyut3 wai4 sin6

Kazim Wilson Tuet Wai-sin (1919–1990), commonly known as Kasim Tuet or Wilson Tuet, was a Chinese entrepreneur who played a major role in the development of Islam in Hong Kong. He was one of the pioneers of Chinese Muslim education in the city.

== Background and life ==
Tuet was a member of a Hui family of Gansu origin. He was born in Canton (now Guangzhou) on 18 December 1919. He followed his father to Hong Kong while still a boy; after graduating from the Kadoorie Academy (嘉道理學院), his first job was in the carpark of the Repulse Bay Hotel. He was elected as chairman of the Chinese Muslim Cultural and Fraternal Association of Hong Kong in 1951. He founded one of the city's earliest cleaning companies in 1953. Towards the end of his life, he served on the Hong Kong Basic Law Consultative Committee and the 7th National Committee of the Chinese People's Political Consultative Conference. He died of illness in 1990.

== Legacy ==
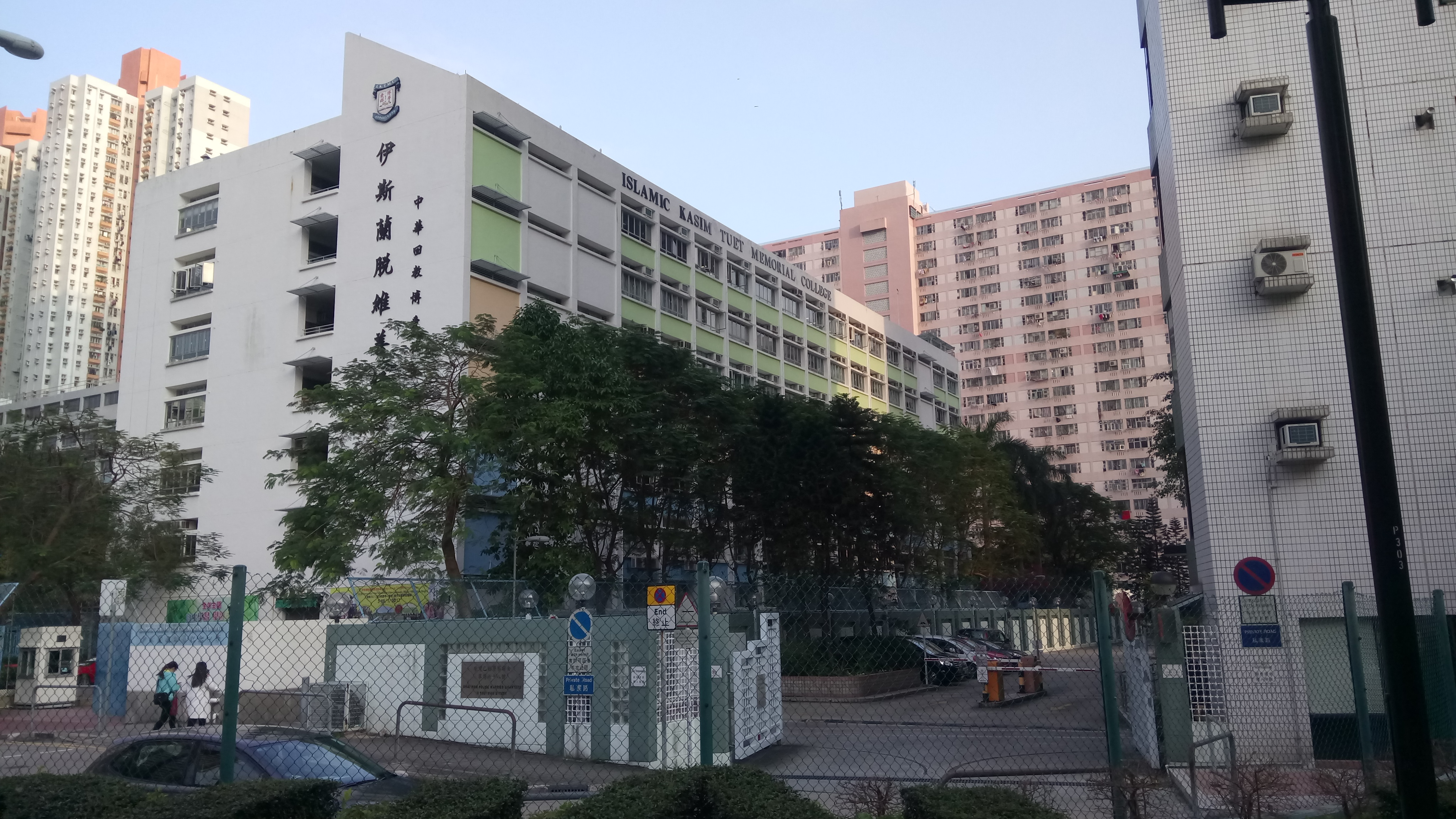
Islamic Kasim Tuet Memorial College

The Islamic Kasim Tuet Memorial College is named for Tuet. His nephew Ayyub Tuet Che-yin (脱志賢) also went on to serve as a chairman of the Chinese Muslim Fraternal and Cultural Association. And his son, Ali Tuet Sui-hong (脫瑞康), continues to chair the company his father founded, reinventing it as a green company focused on environmental protection, and expanding it to over 6,000 employees.
