= Amrit Bhattarai =

Nepalese cricketer

Amrit
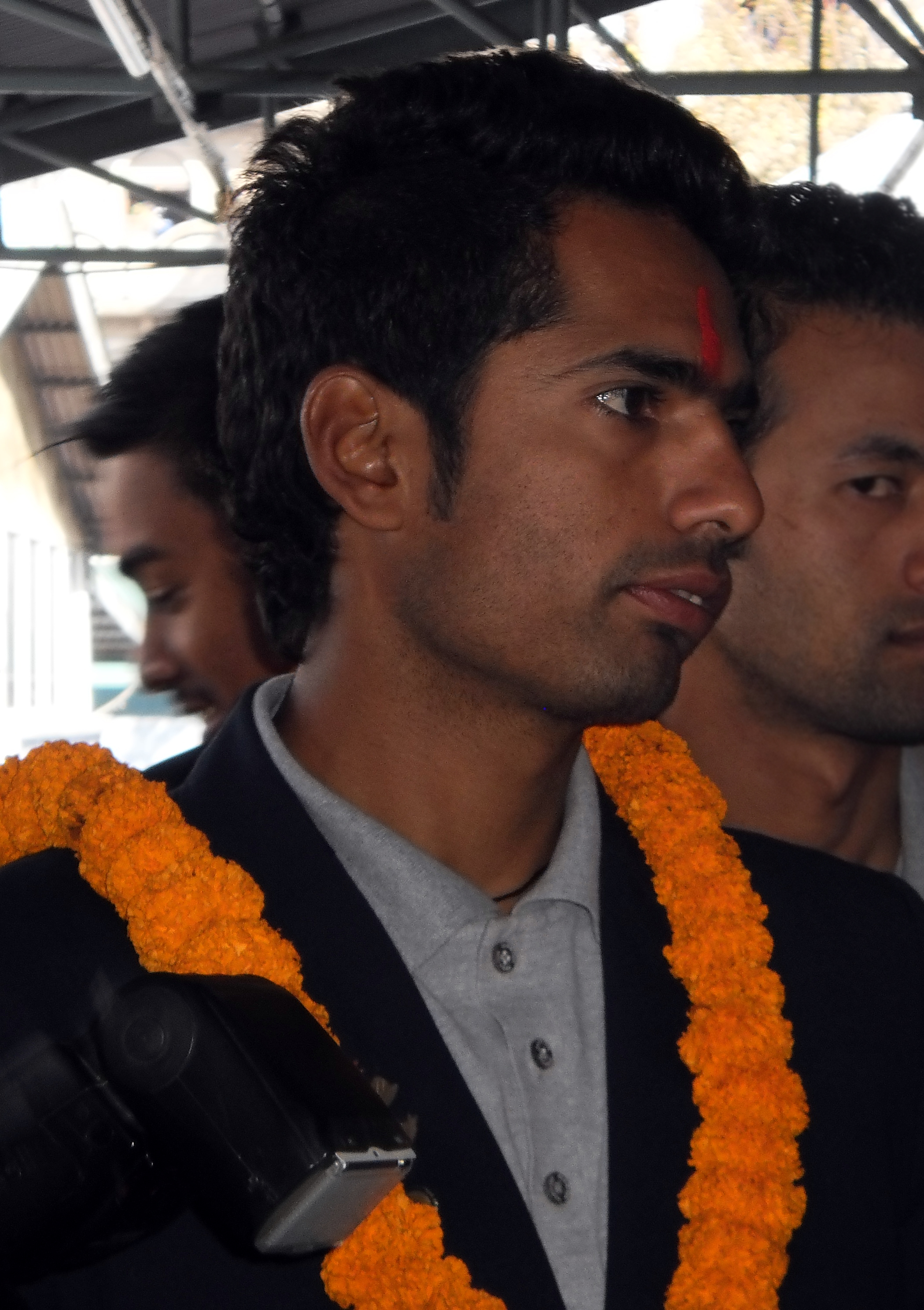

Personal information
- Born: 30 December 1990 (age 35); Nepal
- Height: 5 ft 9 in (1.75 m)
- Batting: Right-handed
- Bowling: Left-arm medium-fast
- Role: Bowler

International information
- National side: Nepal (2014)
- Only T20I (cap 12): 24 November 2014 v Hong Kong
- T20I shirt no.: 25

Domestic team information
- Years: Team
- 2011–2013: APF (National League)
- 2014–2014: Kantipur Gurkhas (NPL)

Career statistics
Competition	T20I	T20	Y ODI
Matches	1	7	12
Runs scored	2	2	29
Batting average	2.00	2.00	9.66
100s/50s	0/0	0/0	0/0
Top score	2	2	9*
Balls bowled	18	120	498
Wickets	1	3	15
Bowling average	12.00	40.66	19.46
5 wickets in innings	0	0	0
10 wickets in match	0	0	0
Best bowling	1/12	2/27	4/42
Catches/stumpings	0/–	0/–	0/–
- Source: CricketArchive, 24 November 2014

Amrit Bhattarai (born 30 December 1990) is a Nepalese cricketer, who plays for the Nepal national team. Amrit is a right-handed batsman and a left-arm medium-fast bowler. He made his debut against Hong Kong in October 2006.

He represents the APF Club of the National League and Kantipur Gurkhas of the Nepal Premier League.

== Junior career ==
Amrit Bhattarai started his national cricketing career by representing Nepal in the 2005 edition of the ACC U-15 tournament. Following impressive performances, Bhattarai secured a place in the under-19 team the same year during the ACC Under-19 Asia Cup where he managed to claim 13 wickets and this performance helped Bhattarai cement his spot in the squad for the 2006 Under-19 World Cup. He scored 82 runs in an inning against Saudi Arabia Under-19, which is his highest score in batting.

== Senior career ==
Bhattarai debuted for the senior national team in 2006 during the ACC Premier League. Slots for fast bowlers were limited then as the lethal opening duo of Binod Das and Mehboob Alam reigned as the strike bowlers of Nepal and Bhattarai wasn't able to outperform the two stars of the national team. Consequently, he had to wait for two years before the left-arm medium pace bowler was recalled to the national squad for the 2008 ICC World Cricket League Division Five.

Bhattarai wasn't able to perform to his potential and failed to make any headlines during the tournament due to which he had to wait for another two years before he was recalled into the squad in 2010 for the ACC Trophy and the Division Four tournament.

Being left out of the squad twice must have gnawed at Bhattarai, who seemed to return with a vengeance during the 2010 Division Four tournament where he bowled exceptionally well to scalp a total of 12 wickets for the eventual tournament winners, Nepal, and since then, Bhattarai hasn't struggled to maintain his place in the national senior side. Some of his memorable performances include four wickets against Singapore in the 2012 Division Four, three against Hong Kong in 2012 ACC Trophy Elite and three against UAE in the 2011 ACC Twenty20 Cup tournament.

Amrit missed the 2013 ACC Emerging Teams Cup in Singapore in August 2013 and 2014 World Cup Qualifier in New Zealand in January 2014. He rode on his luck to find a place in the national team for the 2014 ICC World Twenty20 after all-rounder Prithu Baskota failed to prove his fitness just a week before leaving to the UAE for training. But he didn't get to play a single match.

He made his comeback for the team in the 2014 ICC World Cricket League Division Three, where he played four matches and picked up four wickets in the tournament.

He made his Twenty20 International debut for Nepal playing against Hong Kong in the Sri Lanka Tour in November 2014 where he also played a three-day match against Sri Lanka Cricket Combined XI.
