= Islamic Kasim Tuet Memorial College =

Coordinates: 22°16′0″N 114°14′24″E

- 22 Tsui Wan Street, Chai Wan; Hong Kong

Information
- Motto: 博學愛群 (Prolific, Academic, Affectionate, and Co-operative)
- Religious affiliation: Islam
- Established: 1970
- Principal: Ho Sau Yin Zareenah
- Website: Official website

Islamic Kasim Tuet Memorial College
- Traditional Chinese: 伊斯蘭脫維善紀念中學
- Simplified Chinese: 伊斯兰脱维善纪念中学
Transcriptions
Standard Mandarin
- Hanyu Pinyin: Yīsīlán Tuō Wéishàn Jìniàn Zhōngxué
Yue: Cantonese
- Yale Romanization: Yīsīlàahn Tuet Wàihsihn Géinihm Jūnghohk
- Jyutping: i1 si1 laan4 tyut3 wai4 sin6 gei2 nim6 zung1 hok6

Islamic English College
- Traditional Chinese: 伊斯蘭英文中學
- Simplified Chinese: 伊斯兰英文中学
Transcriptions
Standard Mandarin
- Hanyu Pinyin: Yīsīlán Yīngwén Zhōngxué
Yue: Cantonese
- Yale Romanization: Yīsīlàahn Yīngmàhn Jūnghohk
- Jyutping: i1 si1 laan4 jing1 man4*2/4 zung1 hok6

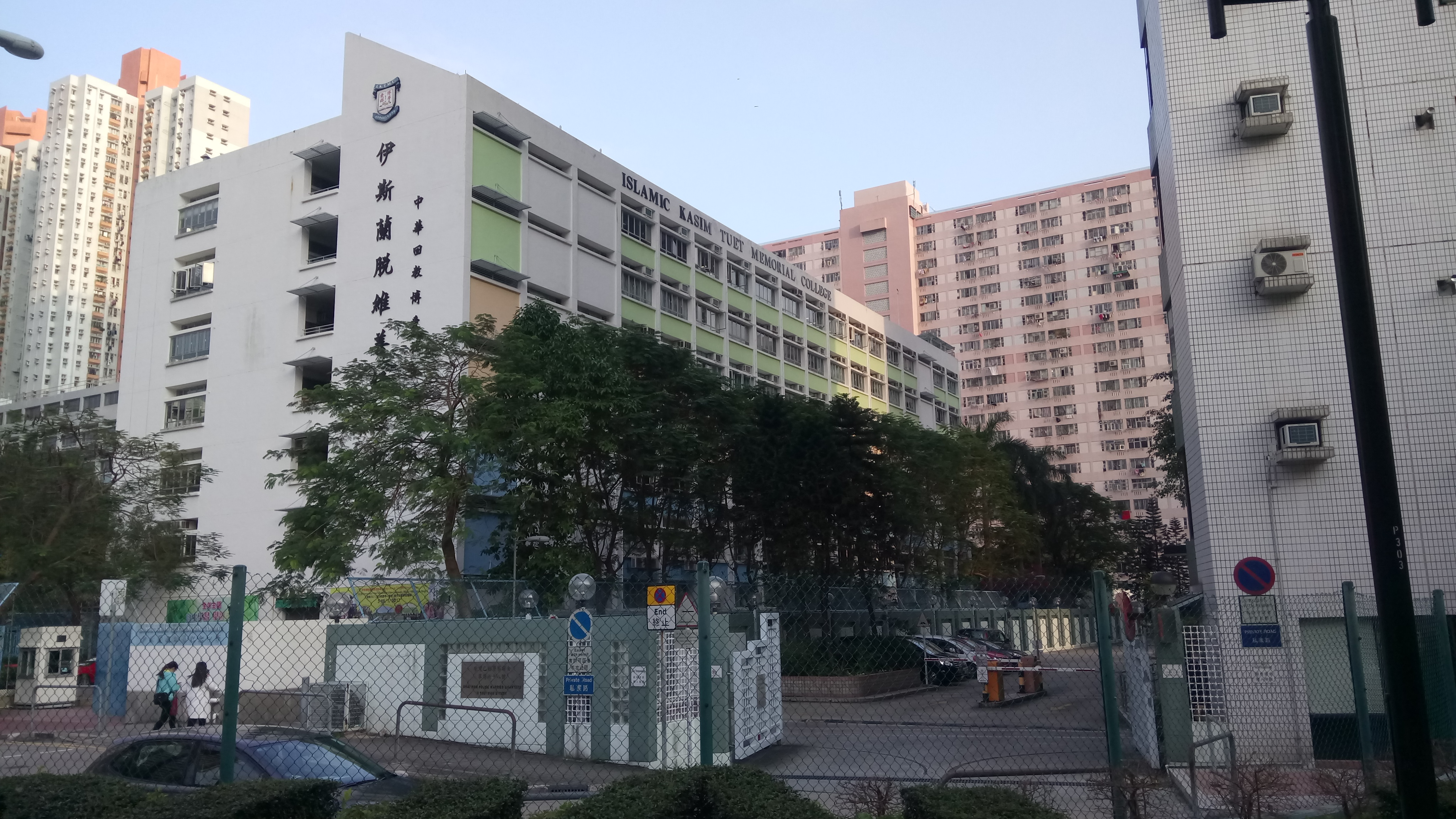
Islamic Kasim Tuet Memorial College

Islamic Kasim Tuet Memorial College (IKTMC) is a secondary school in Chai Wan, Hong Kong. It is named after Kasim Tuet, a Hui Muslim who played a major role in the development of Chinese Muslim education in the city. Formerly known as the Islamic College, it is the only Islamic secondary school aided by the Hong Kong Education Bureau (EDB).

== History ==
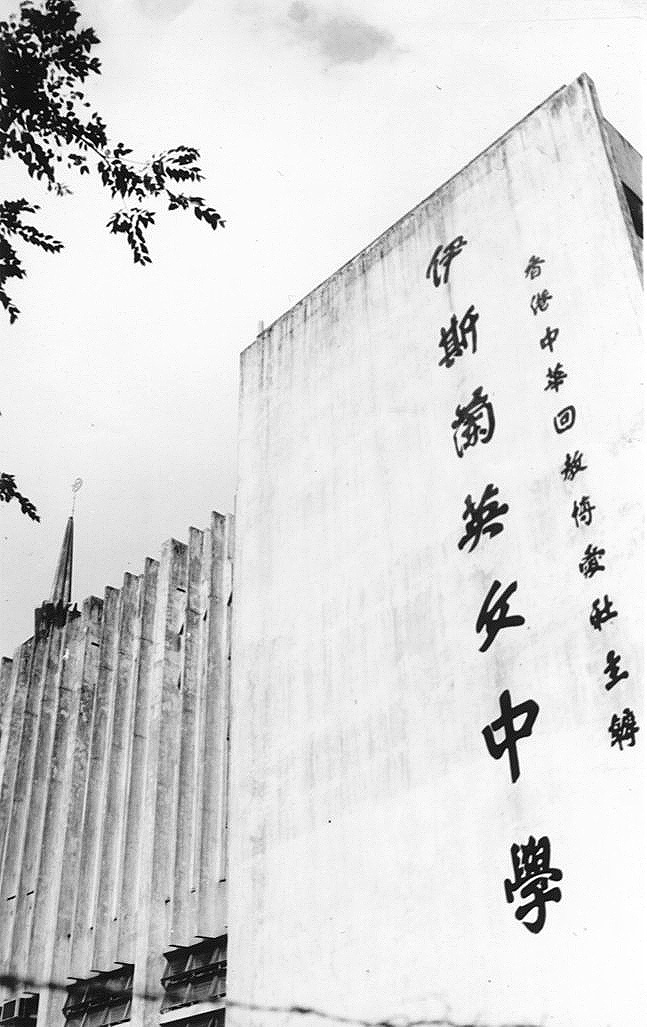
Islamic English College, predecessor of IKTMC

Founded in 1970 as Islamic College, the school was formally renamed Islamic Kasim Tuet Memorial College in 1997. It is founded and sponsored by the Chinese Muslim Cultural and Fraternal Association. The school motto is composed of four key Chinese characters: Prolific, Academic, Affectionate, and Cooperative, which represent the fraternal nature and peace-loving spirit of Islamic teachings.

== Academics ==
The school has 6 grades, namely Secondary 1 to Secondary 6 (S1-S6). The S1-S3 curriculum includes the 8 key learning areas as introduced by EDB, namely:

- Chinese Language Education
- English Language Education
- Mathematics Education
- Personal, Social, Humanities Education
- Science Education
- Technology Education
- Arts Education
- Physical Education.

The school implements the New Secondary School Curriculum at Secondary 4. Apart from the 4 core subjects (i.e. Chinese Language, English Language, Mathematics, and Citizenship & Social Development), students should choose to study 3 more elective subjects.

At present, students in S1-S6 are taught according to the HKDSE syllabuses and helped to prepare for the Hong Kong Diploma of Secondary Education.

Special arrangements are made and school-based curriculum is utilized for non-Chinese students, who will sit for the IGCSE and GCE Chinese Language examination conducted in Hong Kong.

== Campus ==
The college has a site area of 6,900 sq m. The 7-storey building is endowed with spacious playgrounds and open areas. There are 26 classrooms, over 20 special rooms (including library, counselling room, career and guidance room, etc.), a hall, 2 basketball courts, 1 cricket court, and 2 covered playgrounds.

== Student life ==
IKTMC's student composition includes students from Malaysia, India, Nepal, Bangladesh, Pakistan, Philippines, Iran, Indonesia, Saudi Arabia, China, and Yemen.

=== School bus service ===
The school provides school bus service from all parts of Kowloon and New Territories (Tuen Mun, Yuen Long, Tin Shui Wai, Kam Tin, Tung Chung, Kwai Chung, Tsuen Wan, Lai King, Sha Tin, Tseung Kwan O, etc.) to the school and vice versa.

=== Oversea educational trips ===
The school has organized trips to Umrah, Brunei, Turkey, Germany, Switzerland, USA, China (Beijing, Shanghai, Hainan etc.), Singapore, Malaysia and Japan over the past few years.

== Notable staff and alumni ==
=== Ifzal Zaffar ===
He graduated in the school year of 2013–2014 at the Islamic Kasim Tuet Memorial College. He is now a member of the Yau Tsim district patrol unit. Ifzal Zaffar made headlines around the world in 2017 after he climbed up the crane on a construction site near the Western Harbour Tunnel and persuaded the distressed man to come down by reassuring him in Urdu.

=== Khan Uzma Nisa ===
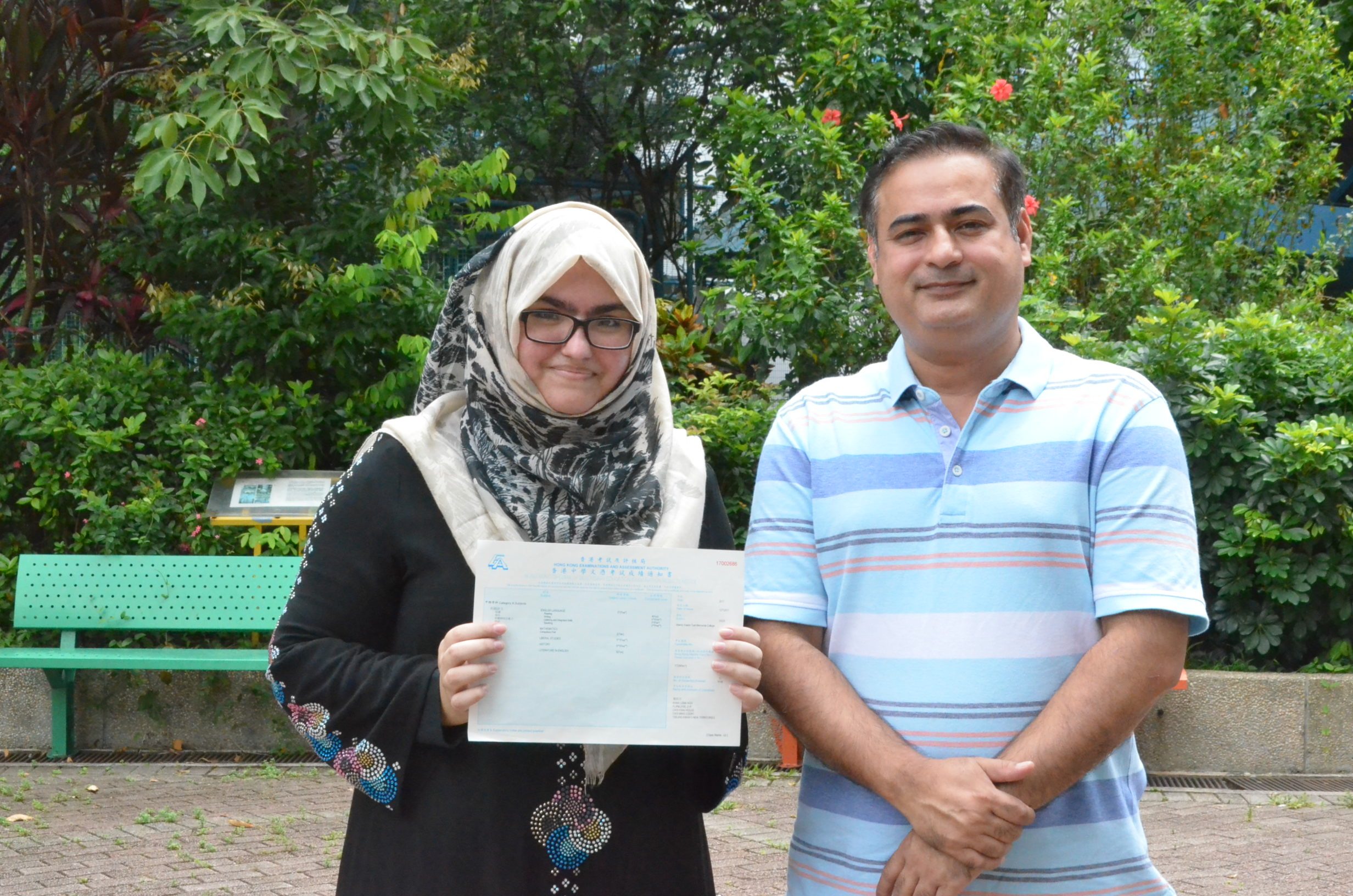
Khan Uzma Nisa achieved 34 points in the HKDSE

She graduated from IKTMC in 2017 and achieved 34 points in the HKDSE. Due to her outstanding academic performance as an ethnic minority, she has been featured by several Hong Kong media.

=== Bibi Tayyaba ===
She graduated from IKTMC in 2012. she was awarded the Sir Edward Youde Memorial Scholarship. She has been admitted to the MSc in education (Higher Education) programme of the University of Oxford starting from the 2017/18 academic year with the aid of a scholarship. Due to her outstanding academic performance as an ethnic minority, she has been featured by several media. She is now an English Language Lecturer at the Education University of Hong Kong.

== See also ==
- Islam in Hong Kong
