= Aizaz Khan =

Hong Kong cricketer

Personal information
- Full name: Aizaz Mohammad Khan
- Born: 21 March 1993 (age 33); Hong Kong
- Batting: Right-handed
- Bowling: Right-arm medium-fast
- Role: All-Rounder

International information
- National side: Hong Kong (2014-present)
- ODI debut (cap 28): 8 November 2014 v Papua New Guinea
- Last ODI: 18 September 2018 v India
- T20I debut (cap 1): 16 March 2014 v Nepal
- Last T20I: 13 November 2025 v Qatar

Career statistics
Competition	ODI	T20I	FC	LA
Matches	19	91	5	66
Runs scored	260	983	55	998
Batting average	20.00	15.85	6.87	20.79
100s/50s	0/0	0/0	0/0	0/4
Top score	44	48*	16	88
Balls bowled	728	1,547	648	2,433
Wickets	16	96	6	61
Bowling average	42.50	21.18	64.66	36.22
5 wickets in innings	0	0	0	0
10 wickets in match	0	0	0	0
Best bowling	2/26	4/26	2/20	3/14
Catches/stumpings	3/–	26/–	1/–	17/–
- Source: ESPNcricinfo, 31 July 2025

Aizaz Mohammad Khan (born 21 March 1993) is a Hong Kong international cricketer who plays as an all-rounder. He debuted for the Hong Kong national side in 2009, and has since played regularly for the team. He is a graduate of Islamic Kasim Tuet Memorial College.

== Early career ==
Having played age-group cricket for Hong Kong Under-19s in the 2010 Under-19 World Cup, Aizaz made his World Cricket League debut for Hong Kong in the 2011 World Cricket League Division Three, where he helped Hong Kong earn promotion to that year's WCL Division Two. It was in this tournament that he made his List A debut, against Uganda, on 8 April 2011.

He played four further List A matches in the competition, the last coming against Namibia. In his five matches, Aizaz scored 71 runs at a batting average of 17.75, with a high score of 33. He also took a single wicket in the competition, that of United Arab Emirates batsman Shaiman Anwar.

At the 2012 ICC World Twenty20 Qualifier, played in the United Arab Emirates, Aizaz took ten wickets in eight matches, behind only Nizakat Khan (11 wickets) for Hong Kong. His wickets came at an average of 17.40, and included a man-of-the-match performance, 5/25, against the United States, who were 101 all out in response to Hong Kong's 177/4 in the tournament's 11th place play-off.

== International career ==
Hong Kong's performance at the 2014 World Cup Qualifier allowed them to regain the ODI status they had previously held. Hong Kong also qualified for the group stage of the 2014 ICC World Twenty20, and Aizaz made his Twenty20 International debut during the tournament, against Nepal. He went on to make his One Day International debut for Hong Kong in November 2014, against Papua New Guinea in Australia. On debut, he scored 42 runs batting eighth – his highest List A score. Hong Kong toured Sri Lanka in the same month to play Nepal, and Aizaz was named the man of the match in the single Twenty20 International the two teams played, taking 2/4 from four overs (as well as two catches) and top-scoring with 21 runs in Hong Kong's two-wicket victory.

In August 2018, he was named in Hong Kong's squad for the 2018 Asia Cup Qualifier tournament. Hong Kong won the qualifier tournament, and he was then named in Hong Kong's squad for the 2018 Asia Cup.

In December 2018, he was named as the captain of Hong Kong's team for the 2018 ACC Emerging Teams Asia Cup. He was the leading wicket-taker for Hong Kong in the tournament, with five dismissals in three matches. In April 2019, he was named in Hong Kong's squad for the 2019 ICC World Cricket League Division Two tournament in Namibia.

In September 2019, he was named as the captain of Hong Kong's Twenty20 International (T20I) team for the 2019–20 Oman Pentangular Series and the 2019 ICC T20 World Cup Qualifier in the United Arab Emirates, after Anshuman Rath quit the side to pursue a career in India. He was the leading wicket-taker for Hong Kong in the T20 World Cup Qualifier, with six dismissals in seven matches.

In November 2019, he was named as the captain of Hong Kong's squad for the 2019 ACC Emerging Teams Asia Cup in Bangladesh. In November 2019, he was named as the captain of Hong Kong's squad for the Cricket World Cup Challenge League B tournament in Oman. In May 2022, he was named in Hong Kong's side for the 2022 Uganda Cricket World Cup Challenge League B tournament.
