= Sri Lanka Schools XI cricket team =

Sri Lanka Schools XI
Personnel
- Captain: Dinesh Chandimal

Team information
- Founded: 2008

History
- IP T20 wins: none

Sri Lanka Schools XI cricket team was a Sri Lankan cricket team that represents Sri Lankan schools. The team featured in the first-class BCCSL Invitation Quadrangular Tournament in 2001/02 and 2002/03, and the Inter-Provincial Twenty20 tournament in 2007–08 and 2008–09, finishing in last place on both occasions.

== Notable players ==
- Angelo Perera
- Bhanuka Rajapaksa
- Dhanushka Gunathilleke
- Dinesh Chandimal
- Vimukthi Perera
