= 2009 Champions League Twenty20 =

International cricket tournament

- Administrators: BCCI; Cricket Australia; Cricket South Africa
- Cricket format: Twenty20
- Tournament format(s): Round-robin and knockout
- Host: India
- Champions: New South Wales Blues (1st title)
- Runners-up: Trinidad and Tobago
- Participants: 12
- Matches: 23
- Player of the series: Brett Lee
- Most runs: JP Duminy (224)
- Most wickets: Dwayne Bravo (12)
- Official website: www.clt20.com

The 2009 Champions League Twenty20 was the first edition of the Champions League Twenty20, an international club cricket tournament. It was held in India between 8 October and 23 October 2009 and featured domestic teams from Australia, England, India, New Zealand, South Africa, Sri Lanka and the West Indies. The New South Wales Blues were the winners of the tournament, defeating Trinidad and Tobago in the final.

== Format ==
The tournament had 23 matches, and is divided into three stages: the group; league; and knockout stages.

During group stage teams were divided into four groups, with each group having three teams. Each team played both of the other teams in their group once with the top two teams in each group advancing to the league stage, in which two new groups were created, each of four teams. Another round-robin tournament was played in each league, although teams that faced each other during the group stage did not play each other again, with the result from their first meeting carried forward. The top two teams from each league advanced to the knockout stage, which consisted of two semi-finals followed by a final.

The total prize money for the competition was US$6 million. In addition to the prize money, each team receives a participation fee of $500,000.

== Qualification ==
This tournament featured 12 teams, an increase from the eight teams for the planned 2008 tournament. Teams were added from New Zealand, Sri Lanka, and the West Indies and the inclusion of a team from Pakistan was removed due to the decline in the relationship between the Indian and Pakistani cricket boards following from the 2008 Mumbai attacks. Lalit Modi, the chairman of the tournament, claimed the Pakistan government was unwilling to give Pakistan players clearance to travel to India, although representatives of the Pakistan Cricket Board claimed they were not contacted on the matter.

Cricket board	Tournament	Number of teams	Teams
Australia	2008–09 KFC Twenty20 Big Bash	2 (winners and runners-up)	New South Wales Blues; Victoria Bushrangers
England and Wales	2009 Twenty20 Cup	2 (winners and runners-up)	Somerset Sabres; Sussex Sharks
India	2009 Indian Premier League	3 (top three teams)	Deccan Chargers; Delhi Daredevils; Royal Challengers Bangalore
New Zealand	2008–09 State Twenty20	1 (winners)	Otago Volts
South Africa	2008–09 Standard Bank Pro20	2 (winners and runners-up)	Cape Cobras; Diamond Eagles
Sri Lanka	2008–09 Inter-Provincial Twenty20	1 (winners)	Wayamba
West Indies	2008 Stanford 20/20	1 (winners)	Trinidad and Tobago

== Players ==
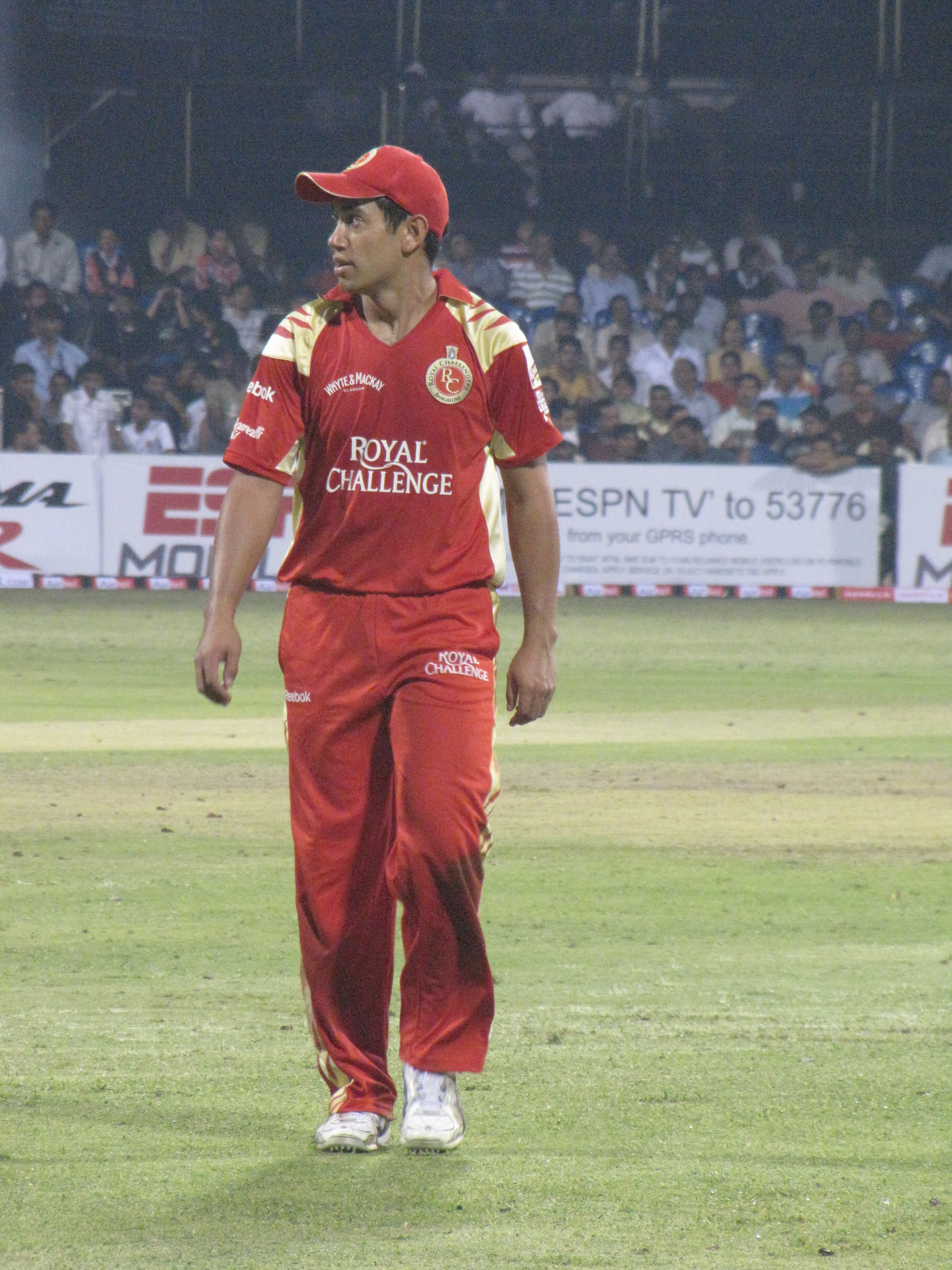
Ross Taylor in October 2009 as RCB Player

There were a number of cases where players were a part of more than one of the teams which had qualified for the tournament. In these cases the player was allowed to only play for the team from the country he was eligible to represent in international cricket unless another team paid US$200,000 compensation. Only Dirk Nannes was named in more than one preliminary squad – those of Delhi Daredevils and his "home" team, the Victorian Bushrangers. Delhi paid Victoria US$200,000 to retain Nannes.

== Venues ==

Three venues were used during the competition, the M. Chinnaswamy Stadium in Bangalore, the Feroz Shah Kotla Stadium in Delhi and the Rajiv Gandhi Stadium in Hyderabad. The semi-finals were played at Delhi and Hyderabad and the final at Hyderabad.

== Reception ==
The tournament was generally not received favourably due to the lack of team recognition outside of the three Indian teams. Matches not involving these teams drew low television ratings and attendances whilst the three Indian teams performed poorly.

== Group stage fixture ==
All times shown are in Indian Standard Time (UTC+05:30).

=== Group A ===
Pos	Team	Pld	W	L	NR	Pts	NRR
1	Trinidad and Tobago	2	2	0	0	4	1.175
2	Somerset Sabres	2	1	1	0	2	−1.000
3	Deccan Chargers	2	0	2	0	0	−0.175

Source: Full table on cricinfo

10 October	Deccan Chargers; 153/9 (20 overs)	v	Somerset Sabres; 157/9 (20 overs)	Somerset Sabres won by 1 wicket
20:00 (D/N); Scorecard	Deccan Chargers; 153/9 (20 overs)	v	Somerset Sabres; 157/9 (20 overs)	Rajiv Gandhi International Cricket Stadium, Hyderabad; Umpires: Daryl Harper and Rudi Koertzen; Player of the match: AC Thomas (Somerset)
20:00 (D/N); Scorecard	VVS Laxman 46 (35); BJ Phillips 3/31 (4 overs)		AC Thomas 30* (17); RP Singh 3/23 (4 overs)	Rajiv Gandhi International Cricket Stadium, Hyderabad; Umpires: Daryl Harper and Rudi Koertzen; Player of the match: AC Thomas (Somerset)
Somerset Sabres won the toss and chose to field.				Rajiv Gandhi International Cricket Stadium, Hyderabad; Umpires: Daryl Harper and Rudi Koertzen; Player of the match: AC Thomas (Somerset)

12 October	Trinidad and Tobago; 150/9 (20 overs)	v	Somerset Sabres; 106 (20 overs)	Trinidad and Tobago won by 44 runs
16:00 (D/N); Scorecard	Trinidad and Tobago; 150/9 (20 overs)	v	Somerset Sabres; 106 (20 overs)	M. Chinnaswamy Stadium, Bangalore; Umpires: Shavir Tarapore and Russell Tiffin; Player of the match: DJ Bravo (Trinidad and Tobago)
16:00 (D/N); Scorecard	D Ramdin 39 (39); CM Willoughby 3/35 (4 overs)		Z de Bruyn 43* (39); DJ Bravo 4/23 (4 overs)	M. Chinnaswamy Stadium, Bangalore; Umpires: Shavir Tarapore and Russell Tiffin; Player of the match: DJ Bravo (Trinidad and Tobago)
Trinidad and Tobago won the toss and chose to bat.				M. Chinnaswamy Stadium, Bangalore; Umpires: Shavir Tarapore and Russell Tiffin; Player of the match: DJ Bravo (Trinidad and Tobago)

14 October	Trinidad and Tobago; 149/7 (20 overs)	v	Deccan Chargers; 146/9 (20 overs)	Trinidad and Tobago won by 3 runs
20:00 (D/N); Scorecard	Trinidad and Tobago; 149/7 (20 overs)	v	Deccan Chargers; 146/9 (20 overs)	Rajiv Gandhi International Cricket Stadium, Hyderabad; Umpires: Daryl Harper and Rudi Koertzen; Player of the match: DJ Bravo (Trinidad and Tobago)
20:00 (D/N); Scorecard	WKD Perkins 38 (32); FH Edwards 3/32 (4 overs)		AC Gilchrist 51 (36); DJ Bravo 3/24 (4 overs)	Rajiv Gandhi International Cricket Stadium, Hyderabad; Umpires: Daryl Harper and Rudi Koertzen; Player of the match: DJ Bravo (Trinidad and Tobago)
Deccan Chargers won the toss and chose to field.				Rajiv Gandhi International Cricket Stadium, Hyderabad; Umpires: Daryl Harper and Rudi Koertzen; Player of the match: DJ Bravo (Trinidad and Tobago)

=== Group B ===
Pos	Team	Pld	W	L	NR	Pts	NRR
1	New South Wales Blues	2	2	0	0	4	2.200
2	Diamond Eagles	2	1	1	0	2	−1.325
3	Sussex Sharks	2	0	2	0	0	−0.875

Source: Full table on cricinfo

9 October	New South Wales Blues; 144/6 (20 overs)	v	Diamond Eagles; 91/9 (20 overs)	New South Wales Blues won by 53 runs
16:00 (D/N); Scorecard	New South Wales Blues; 144/6 (20 overs)	v	Diamond Eagles; 91/9 (20 overs)	Feroz Shah Kotla, Delhi; Umpires: Billy Doctrove and Sanjay Hazare; Player of the match: SM Katich (New South Wales Blues)
16:00 (D/N); Scorecard	SM Katich 53 (41); SC van Schalkwyk 2/22 (3 overs)		R McLaren 40 (37); SR Clark 3/12 (4 overs)	Feroz Shah Kotla, Delhi; Umpires: Billy Doctrove and Sanjay Hazare; Player of the match: SM Katich (New South Wales Blues)
New South Wales Blues won the toss and chose to bat.				Feroz Shah Kotla, Delhi; Umpires: Billy Doctrove and Sanjay Hazare; Player of the match: SM Katich (New South Wales Blues)

11 October	New South Wales Blues; 130/2 (20 overs)	v	Sussex Sharks; 95/8 (20 overs)	New South Wales Blues won by 35 runs
16:00 (D/N); Scorecard	New South Wales Blues; 130/2 (20 overs)	v	Sussex Sharks; 95/8 (20 overs)	Feroz Shah Kotla, Delhi; Umpires: Kumar Dharmasena and Sanjay Hazare; Player of the match: MC Henriques (New South Wales Blues)
16:00 (D/N); Scorecard	PJ Hughes 62* (64); PP Chawla 1/21 (2 overs)		CD Nash 24 (30); MC Henriques 3/23 (4 overs)	Feroz Shah Kotla, Delhi; Umpires: Kumar Dharmasena and Sanjay Hazare; Player of the match: MC Henriques (New South Wales Blues)
New South Wales Blues won the toss and chose to bat.				Feroz Shah Kotla, Delhi; Umpires: Kumar Dharmasena and Sanjay Hazare; Player of the match: MC Henriques (New South Wales Blues)

13 October	Sussex Sharks; 119/7 (20 overs)	v	Diamond Eagles; 119/4 (20 overs)	Match tied; Diamond Eagles won by Super Over
20:00 (D/N); Scorecard	Sussex Sharks; 119/7 (20 overs)	v	Diamond Eagles; 119/4 (20 overs)	Feroz Shah Kotla, Delhi; Umpires: Kumar Dharmasena and Sanjay Hazare; Player of the match: RR Rossouw (Diamond Eagles)
20:00 (D/N); Scorecard	JS Gatting 25 (22); CJD de Villiers 2/20 (4 overs)		RR Rossouw 65 (62); RJ Hamilton-Brown 2/15 (3 overs)	Feroz Shah Kotla, Delhi; Umpires: Kumar Dharmasena and Sanjay Hazare; Player of the match: RR Rossouw (Diamond Eagles)
Sussex Sharks won the toss and chose to bat.				Feroz Shah Kotla, Delhi; Umpires: Kumar Dharmasena and Sanjay Hazare; Player of the match: RR Rossouw (Diamond Eagles)

=== Group C ===
Pos	Team	Pld	W	L	NR	Pts	NRR
1	Cape Cobras	2	2	0	0	4	1.529
2	Royal Challengers Bangalore	2	1	1	0	2	1.839
3	Otago Volts	2	0	2	0	0	−3.350

Source: Full table on cricinfo

8 October	Royal Challengers Bangalore; 180/4 (20 overs)	v	Cape Cobras; 184/5 (19.4 overs)	Cape Cobras won by 5 wickets
20:00 (D/N); Scorecard	Royal Challengers Bangalore; 180/4 (20 overs)	v	Cape Cobras; 184/5 (19.4 overs)	M. Chinnaswamy Stadium, Bangalore; Umpires: Brian Jerling and Russell Tiffin; Player of the match: JP Duminy (Cape Cobras)
20:00 (D/N); Scorecard	LRPL Taylor 53* (24); CK Langeveldt 1/12 (3 overs)		JP Duminy 99* (52); Praveen Kumar 3/32 (4 overs)	M. Chinnaswamy Stadium, Bangalore; Umpires: Brian Jerling and Russell Tiffin; Player of the match: JP Duminy (Cape Cobras)
Royal Challengers Bangalore won the toss and chose to bat.				M. Chinnaswamy Stadium, Bangalore; Umpires: Brian Jerling and Russell Tiffin; Player of the match: JP Duminy (Cape Cobras)

10 October	Cape Cobras; 193/4 (20 overs)	v	Otago Volts; 139 (17.1 overs)	Cape Cobras won by 54 runs
16:00 (D/N); Scorecard	Cape Cobras; 193/4 (20 overs)	v	Otago Volts; 139 (17.1 overs)	Rajiv Gandhi International Cricket Stadium, Hyderabad; Umpires: Daryl Harper and Amiesh Saheba; Player of the match: AG Puttick (Cape Cobras)
16:00 (D/N); Scorecard	AG Puttick 104* (62); AD Mascarenhas 2/20 (4 overs)		NL McCullum 38 (21); RK Kleinveldt 3/24 (3 overs)	Rajiv Gandhi International Cricket Stadium, Hyderabad; Umpires: Daryl Harper and Amiesh Saheba; Player of the match: AG Puttick (Cape Cobras)
Otago won the toss and chose to field.; Andrew Puttick became the first to score a century in the Champions League Twenty20.				Rajiv Gandhi International Cricket Stadium, Hyderabad; Umpires: Daryl Harper and Amiesh Saheba; Player of the match: AG Puttick (Cape Cobras)

12 October	Royal Challengers Bangalore; 188/2 (20 overs)	v	Otago Volts; 108 (17.5 overs)	Royal Challengers Bangalore won by 80 runs
20:00 (D/N); Scorecard	Royal Challengers Bangalore; 188/2 (20 overs)	v	Otago Volts; 108 (17.5 overs)	M. Chinnaswamy Stadium, Bangalore; Umpires: Brian Jerling and Russell Tiffin; Player of the match: JH Kallis (Royal Challengers Bangalore)
20:00 (D/N); Scorecard	JH Kallis 73* (59); AJ Redmond 1/23 (3 overs)		CD Cumming 20 (17); JH Kallis 3/18 (4 overs)	M. Chinnaswamy Stadium, Bangalore; Umpires: Brian Jerling and Russell Tiffin; Player of the match: JH Kallis (Royal Challengers Bangalore)
Royal Challengers Bangalore won the toss and chose to bat.				M. Chinnaswamy Stadium, Bangalore; Umpires: Brian Jerling and Russell Tiffin; Player of the match: JH Kallis (Royal Challengers Bangalore)

=== Group D ===
Pos	Team	Pld	W	L	NR	Pts	NRR
1	Delhi Daredevils	2	1	1	0	2	0.700
2	Victorian Bushrangers	2	1	1	0	2	0.136
3	Wayamba	2	1	1	0	2	−0.875

Source: Full table on cricinfo

9 October	Delhi Daredevils; 98/8 (20 overs)	v	Victorian Bushrangers; 100/3 (16.4 overs)	Victorian Bushrangers won by 7 wickets
20:00 (D/N); Scorecard	Delhi Daredevils; 98/8 (20 overs)	v	Victorian Bushrangers; 100/3 (16.4 overs)	Feroz Shah Kotla, Delhi; Umpires: Kumar Dharmasena and Billy Doctrove; Player of the match: CJ McKay (Victorian Bushrangers)
20:00 (D/N); Scorecard	M Manhas 25 (34); CJ McKay 3/17 (4 overs)		RJ Quiney 40 (33); TM Dilshan 1/14 (4 overs)	Feroz Shah Kotla, Delhi; Umpires: Kumar Dharmasena and Billy Doctrove; Player of the match: CJ McKay (Victorian Bushrangers)
Delhi Daredevils won the toss and chose to bat.				Feroz Shah Kotla, Delhi; Umpires: Kumar Dharmasena and Billy Doctrove; Player of the match: CJ McKay (Victorian Bushrangers)

11 October	Delhi Daredevils; 170/5 (20 overs)	v	Wayamba; 120/7 (20 overs)	Delhi Daredevils won by 50 runs
20:00 (D/N); Scorecard	Delhi Daredevils; 170/5 (20 overs)	v	Wayamba; 120/7 (20 overs)	Feroz Shah Kotla, Delhi; Umpires: Billy Doctrove and Sanjay Hazare; Player of the match: V Sehwag (Delhi Daredevils)
20:00 (D/N); Scorecard	V Sehwag 66 (42); UWMBCA Welegedara 2/24 (4 overs)		DPMD Jayawardene 53 (40); DP Nannes 4/24 (4 overs)	Feroz Shah Kotla, Delhi; Umpires: Billy Doctrove and Sanjay Hazare; Player of the match: V Sehwag (Delhi Daredevils)
Delhi Daredevils won the toss and chose to bat.				Feroz Shah Kotla, Delhi; Umpires: Billy Doctrove and Sanjay Hazare; Player of the match: V Sehwag (Delhi Daredevils)

13 October	Wayamba; 118/9 (20 overs)	v	Victorian Bushrangers; 103/4 (20 overs)	Wayamba won by 15 runs
16:00 (D/N); Scorecard	Wayamba; 118/9 (20 overs)	v	Victorian Bushrangers; 103/4 (20 overs)	Feroz Shah Kotla, Delhi; Umpires: Billy Doctrove and Sanjay Hazare; Player of the match: SM Harwood (Victorian Bushrangers)
16:00 (D/N); Scorecard	MG Vandort 42 (44); SM Harwood 3/14 (4 overs)		BJ Hodge 44* (52); Chanaka Welegedara 2/18 (4 overs)	Feroz Shah Kotla, Delhi; Umpires: Billy Doctrove and Sanjay Hazare; Player of the match: SM Harwood (Victorian Bushrangers)
Wayamba won the toss and chose to bat.				Feroz Shah Kotla, Delhi; Umpires: Billy Doctrove and Sanjay Hazare; Player of the match: SM Harwood (Victorian Bushrangers)

== League stage fixtures ==
=== League A ===
Pos	Team	Pld	W	L	NR	Pts	NRR
1	Trinidad and Tobago	3	3	0	0	6	1.378
2	New South Wales Blues	3	2	1	0	4	1.843
3	Diamond Eagles	3	1	2	0	2	−1.110
4	Somerset Sabres	3	0	3	0	0	−2.005

Source: Full table on cricinfo

16 October	Somerset Sabres; 132/8 (20 overs)	v	Diamond Eagles; 133/5 (18.4 overs)	Diamond Eagles won by 5 wickets
16:00 (D/N); Scorecard	Somerset Sabres; 132/8 (20 overs)	v	Diamond Eagles; 133/5 (18.4 overs)	Rajiv Gandhi International Cricket Stadium, Hyderabad; Umpires: Rudi Koertzen and Amiesh Saheba; Player of the match: CJD de Villiers (Diamond Eagles)
16:00 (D/N); Scorecard	WJ Durston 57 (32); CJD de Villiers 4/17 (4 overs)		MN van Wyk 47 (41); AC Thomas 2/20 (3.4 overs)	Rajiv Gandhi International Cricket Stadium, Hyderabad; Umpires: Rudi Koertzen and Amiesh Saheba; Player of the match: CJD de Villiers (Diamond Eagles)
Somerset Sabres won the toss and chose to bat.				Rajiv Gandhi International Cricket Stadium, Hyderabad; Umpires: Rudi Koertzen and Amiesh Saheba; Player of the match: CJD de Villiers (Diamond Eagles)

16 October	New South Wales Blues; 170/4 (20 overs)	v	Trinidad and Tobago; 171/6 (18.3 overs)	Trinidad and Tobago won by 4 wickets
20:00 (D/N); Scorecard	New South Wales Blues; 170/4 (20 overs)	v	Trinidad and Tobago; 171/6 (18.3 overs)	Rajiv Gandhi International Cricket Stadium, Hyderabad; Umpires: Daryl Harper and Amiesh Saheba; Player of the match: KA Pollard (Trinidad and Tobago)
20:00 (D/N); Scorecard	PJ Hughes 83 (64); DJ Bravo 3/31 (4 overs)		KA Pollard 54* (18); B Lee 1/17 (3 overs)	Rajiv Gandhi International Cricket Stadium, Hyderabad; Umpires: Daryl Harper and Amiesh Saheba; Player of the match: KA Pollard (Trinidad and Tobago)
New South Wales Blues won the toss and chose to bat.				Rajiv Gandhi International Cricket Stadium, Hyderabad; Umpires: Daryl Harper and Amiesh Saheba; Player of the match: KA Pollard (Trinidad and Tobago)

18 October	Somerset Sabres; 111/7 (20 overs)	v	New South Wales Blues; 112/4 (11.5 overs)	New South Wales Blues won by 6 wickets
16:00 (D/N); Scorecard	Somerset Sabres; 111/7 (20 overs)	v	New South Wales Blues; 112/4 (11.5 overs)	Rajiv Gandhi International Cricket Stadium, Hyderabad; Umpires: Daryl Harper and Rudi Koertzen; Player of the match: SR Clark (New South Wales Blues)
16:00 (D/N); Scorecard	Z de Bruyn 23 (32); SR Clark 3/15 (4 overs)		DA Warner 40 (16); Z de Bruyn 2/19 (2 overs)	Rajiv Gandhi International Cricket Stadium, Hyderabad; Umpires: Daryl Harper and Rudi Koertzen; Player of the match: SR Clark (New South Wales Blues)
New South Wales Blues won the toss and chose to field.				Rajiv Gandhi International Cricket Stadium, Hyderabad; Umpires: Daryl Harper and Rudi Koertzen; Player of the match: SR Clark (New South Wales Blues)

18 October	Trinidad and Tobago; 213/4 (20 overs)	v	Diamond Eagles; 189/5 (20 overs)	Trinidad and Tobago won by 24 runs
20:00 (D/N); Scorecard	Trinidad and Tobago; 213/4 (20 overs)	v	Diamond Eagles; 189/5 (20 overs)	Rajiv Gandhi International Cricket Stadium, Hyderabad; Umpires: Rudi Koertzen and Amiesh Saheba; Player of the match: AB Barath (Trinidad and Tobago)
20:00 (D/N); Scorecard	AB Barath 63 (41); MS Tshabalala 1/23 (2 overs)		RR Rossouw 44 (19); S Ganga, KA Pollard 2/25 (3 overs)	Rajiv Gandhi International Cricket Stadium, Hyderabad; Umpires: Rudi Koertzen and Amiesh Saheba; Player of the match: AB Barath (Trinidad and Tobago)
Trinidad and Tobago won the toss and chose to bat.				Rajiv Gandhi International Cricket Stadium, Hyderabad; Umpires: Rudi Koertzen and Amiesh Saheba; Player of the match: AB Barath (Trinidad and Tobago)

=== League B ===
Pos	Team	Pld	W	L	NR	Pts	NRR
1	Victorian Bushrangers	3	2	1	0	4	0.911
2	Cape Cobras	3	2	1	0	4	−0.219
3	Royal Challengers Bangalore	3	1	2	0	2	−0.114
4	Delhi Daredevils	3	1	2	0	2	−0.398

Source: Full table on cricinfo

15 October	Royal Challengers Bangalore; 127/6 (20 overs)	v	Victorian Bushrangers; 133/3 (15.5 overs)	Victorian Bushrangers won by 7 wickets
20:00 (D/N); Scorecard	Royal Challengers Bangalore; 127/6 (20 overs)	v	Victorian Bushrangers; 133/3 (15.5 overs)	M. Chinnaswamy Stadium, Bangalore; Umpires: Brian Jerling and Shavir Tarapore; Player of the match: AB McDonald (Victorian Bushrangers)
20:00 (D/N); Scorecard	MK Pandey 39 (28); AB McDonald 4/21 (4 overs)		DJ Hussey 31* (15); B Akhil, RE van der Merwe 1/20 (3 overs)	M. Chinnaswamy Stadium, Bangalore; Umpires: Brian Jerling and Shavir Tarapore; Player of the match: AB McDonald (Victorian Bushrangers)
Royal Challengers Bangalore won the toss and chose to bat.				M. Chinnaswamy Stadium, Bangalore; Umpires: Brian Jerling and Shavir Tarapore; Player of the match: AB McDonald (Victorian Bushrangers)

17 October	Victorian Bushrangers; 125/5 (17 overs)	v	Cape Cobras; 129/2 (16 overs)	Cape Cobras won by 8 wickets
16:00 (D/N); Scorecard	Victorian Bushrangers; 125/5 (17 overs)	v	Cape Cobras; 129/2 (16 overs)	M. Chinnaswamy Stadium, Bangalore; Umpires: Shavir Tarapore and Russell Tiffin; Player of the match: H Davids (Cape Cobras)
16:00 (D/N); Scorecard	AB McDonald 29* (22); M Zondeki 2/21 (4 overs)		H Davids 69* (54); PM Siddle 1/19 (4 overs)	M. Chinnaswamy Stadium, Bangalore; Umpires: Shavir Tarapore and Russell Tiffin; Player of the match: H Davids (Cape Cobras)
Victoria won the toss and chose to bat.				M. Chinnaswamy Stadium, Bangalore; Umpires: Shavir Tarapore and Russell Tiffin; Player of the match: H Davids (Cape Cobras)

17 October	Delhi Daredevils; 138/6 (20 overs)	v	Royal Challengers Bangalore; 139/2 (15.1 overs)	Royal Challengers Bangalore won by 8 wickets
20:00 (D/N); Scorecard	Delhi Daredevils; 138/6 (20 overs)	v	Royal Challengers Bangalore; 139/2 (15.1 overs)	M. Chinnaswamy Stadium, Bangalore; Umpires: Brian Jerling and Russell Tiffin; Player of the match: LRPL Taylor (Royal Challengers Bangalore)
20:00 (D/N); Scorecard	V Sehwag 47 (29); A Kumble 3/20 (4 overs)		LRPL Taylor 65 (38); DP Nannes 2/19 (4 overs)	M. Chinnaswamy Stadium, Bangalore; Umpires: Brian Jerling and Russell Tiffin; Player of the match: LRPL Taylor (Royal Challengers Bangalore)
Royal Challengers Bangalore won the toss and chose to field.				M. Chinnaswamy Stadium, Bangalore; Umpires: Brian Jerling and Russell Tiffin; Player of the match: LRPL Taylor (Royal Challengers Bangalore)

19 October	Delhi Daredevils; 114/6 (20 overs)	v	Cape Cobras; 84 (18.3 overs)	Delhi Daredevils won by 30 runs
20:00 (D/N); Scorecard	Delhi Daredevils; 114/6 (20 overs)	v	Cape Cobras; 84 (18.3 overs)	Feroz Shah Kotla, Delhi; Umpires: Kumar Dharmasena and Billy Doctrove; Player of the match: OA Shah (Delhi Daredevils)
20:00 (D/N); Scorecard	OA Shah 39* (38); JL Ontong 2/8 (1 over)		H Davids 22 (29); DP Nannes 3/19 (4 overs)	Feroz Shah Kotla, Delhi; Umpires: Kumar Dharmasena and Billy Doctrove; Player of the match: OA Shah (Delhi Daredevils)
Cape Cobras won the toss and chose to field.				Feroz Shah Kotla, Delhi; Umpires: Kumar Dharmasena and Billy Doctrove; Player of the match: OA Shah (Delhi Daredevils)

== Knockout stage ==
Semifinals
B1	Victorian Bushrangers	90/9 (20 ov)
A2	New South Wales Blues	169/7 (20 ov)
B2	Cape Cobras	175/5 (20 ov)
A1	Trinidad and Tobago	178/3 (19.2 ov)

Finals
A2	New South Wales Blues	159/9 (20 ov)
A1	Trinidad and Tobago	118 (15.5 ov)

21 October	New South Wales Blues; 169/7 (20 overs)	v	Victorian Bushrangers; 90/9 (20 overs)	New South Wales Blues won by 79 runs
20:00 (D/N); Scorecard	New South Wales Blues; 169/7 (20 overs)	v	Victorian Bushrangers; 90/9 (20 overs)	Feroz Shah Kotla, Delhi; Umpires: Kumar Dharmasena and Billy Doctrove; Player of the match: DA Warner (New South Wales Blues)
20:00 (D/N); Scorecard	DA Warner 48 (25); CJ McKay 3/27 (4 overs)		MS Wade 23* (29); Henriques 3/11 (3 overs)	Feroz Shah Kotla, Delhi; Umpires: Kumar Dharmasena and Billy Doctrove; Player of the match: DA Warner (New South Wales Blues)
New South Wales Blues won the toss and chose to bat.				Feroz Shah Kotla, Delhi; Umpires: Kumar Dharmasena and Billy Doctrove; Player of the match: DA Warner (New South Wales Blues)

22 October	Cape Cobras; 175/5 (20 overs)	v	Trinidad and Tobago; 178/3 (19.2 overs)	Trinidad and Tobago won by 7 wickets
20:00 (D/N); Scorecard	Cape Cobras; 175/5 (20 overs)	v	Trinidad and Tobago; 178/3 (19.2 overs)	Rajiv Gandhi International Cricket Stadium, Hyderabad; Umpires: Daryl Harper and Rudi Koertzen; Player of the match: DJ Bravo (Trinidad and Tobago)
20:00 (D/N); Scorecard	JP Duminy 61* (40); LMP Simmons 2/17 (3 overs)		DJ Bravo 58* (34); JL Ontong 1/14 (2 overs)	Rajiv Gandhi International Cricket Stadium, Hyderabad; Umpires: Daryl Harper and Rudi Koertzen; Player of the match: DJ Bravo (Trinidad and Tobago)
Cape Cobras won the toss and chose to bat.				Rajiv Gandhi International Cricket Stadium, Hyderabad; Umpires: Daryl Harper and Rudi Koertzen; Player of the match: DJ Bravo (Trinidad and Tobago)

23 October	New South Wales Blues; 159/9 (20 overs)	v	Trinidad and Tobago; 118 (15.5 overs)	New South Wales Blues won by 41 runs
20:00 (D/N); Scorecard	New South Wales Blues; 159/9 (20 overs)	v	Trinidad and Tobago; 118 (15.5 overs)	Rajiv Gandhi International Cricket Stadium, Hyderabad; Attendance: 38,422; Umpires: Daryl Harper and Rudi Koertzen; Player of the match: B Lee (New South Wales Blues)
20:00 (D/N); Scorecard	B Lee 48 (31); R Rampaul 3/20 (4 overs)		KA Pollard 26 (15); SR Clark 3/21 (3.5 overs)	Rajiv Gandhi International Cricket Stadium, Hyderabad; Attendance: 38,422; Umpires: Daryl Harper and Rudi Koertzen; Player of the match: B Lee (New South Wales Blues)
Trinidad and Tobago won the toss and chose to field.				Rajiv Gandhi International Cricket Stadium, Hyderabad; Attendance: 38,422; Umpires: Daryl Harper and Rudi Koertzen; Player of the match: B Lee (New South Wales Blues)

== Statistics ==
=== Most runs ===
Player	Team	Runs
JP Duminy	Cape Cobras	224
David Warner	New South Wales Blues	207
Phillip Hughes	New South Wales Blues	202
Ross Taylor	Royal Challengers Bangalore	152
Kieron Pollard	Trinidad and Tobago	146

- Source: CricInfo

=== Most wickets ===
Player	Team	Wickets
Dwayne Bravo	Trinidad and Tobago	12
Moisés Henriques	New South Wales Blues	10
Clint McKay	Victorian Bushrangers	10
Three players took nine wickets

- Source: CricInfo
