= Dilhara Lokuhettige =

Sri Lankan cricketer (born 1980)

Personal information
- Full name: Loku Hettige Danushka Dilhara
- Born: 3 July 1980 (age 46); Colombo, Sri Lanka
- Batting: Right-handed
- Bowling: Right-arm fast-medium
- Role: Wicket-keeper

International information
- National side: Sri Lanka (2005–2013)
- ODI debut (cap 124): 30 July 2005 v India
- Last ODI: 9 July 2013 v India
- T20I debut (cap 6): 10 October 2008 v Zimbabwe
- Last T20I: 12 October 2008 v Canada

Career statistics
Competition	ODI	T20I
Matches	9	2
Runs scored	83	18
Batting average	9.22	–
100s/50s	0/0	0/0
Top score	29	18*
Balls bowled	330	30
Wickets	6	2
Bowling average	43.50	15.00
5 wickets in innings	0	0
10 wickets in match	0	0
Best bowling	2/30	2/6
Catches/stumpings	3/–	0/–
Medal record
Representing Sri Lanka
Men's Cricket
Asian Games
Gold medal – first place	2014 Incheon	Team
- Source: Cricinfo], 10 April 2017

Loku Hettige Danushka Dilhara (born 3 July 1980), known as Dilhara Lokuhettige, is a Sri Lankan former cricketer, who played limited over cricket. He is a right-handed batsman and a right-arm medium-fast bowler. Lokuhittege had captained Colombo's Asoka Vidalaya from Under-13s to senior level. In January 2021, he was found guilty of three offences under the ICC Anti-Corruption Code. As a result, he was banned from all cricket for eight years.

== Fixing allegations ==
Lokuhettige was suspected by Al Jazeera along with Jeevantha Kulatunga for being involved in match fixing during a fake T20 series in the United Arab Emirates.

The Al Jazeera's Investigation Unit also revealed that former Pakistani cricketer Hasan Raza, Jeevantha Kulatunga and Dilhara Lokuhettige were preparing to make money by organising and arranging a fake tournament in the UAE solely to make huge collection of money to fix matches in the future.

== International career ==
When he was first picked for the Indian Oil Cup in 2005, there was relative shock, as Lokuhettige was picked practically out of obscurity after moderate domestic performances. However, he proved a quality acquisition, capturing both good batting and bowling statistics.

== Domestic career ==
His big break came when he joined Bloomfield and met Ruchira Palliyaguru in 1999, who recommended him to the cricketing academy. He has Twenty-20 cricket since 2004 and was picked for the national team for the first time in July 2005. He made his Twenty20 debut on 17 August 2004, for Moors Sports Club in the 2004 SLC Twenty20 Tournament.

== Retirement ==
Lokuhettige announced his retirement from Tests and ODIs on 24 September 2016. He criticized captain Angelo Mathews by stating that he cannot enter to the squad until Mathews playing for the team.
