= Tharanga Lakshitha =

Sri Lankan cricketer (born 1982)

Personal information
- Full name: Ahangama Baduge Tharanga Lakshitha
- Born: 30 April 1982 (age 44); Matara, Sri Lanka
- Source: Cricinfo, 7 August 2015

Tharanga Lakshitha (born 30 April 1982) is a Sri Lankan cricketer who played in 111 first-class and 99 List A matches. He made his Twenty20 debut on 17 August 2004, for Bloomfield Cricket and Athletic Club in the 2004 SLC Twenty20 Tournament. He was educated at St. Servatius' College

== See also ==
- List of Chilaw Marians Cricket Club players
