= Chinese Muslim Cultural and Fraternal Association =

Religious organization based in Wan Chai, Hong Kong, China

Chinese Muslim Cultural and Fraternal Association 中華回教博愛社
- Founded: 1922
- Location: Wan Chai, Hong Kong, China
- Region served: Hong Kong
- Website: Official website (in Chinese)

Chinese Muslim Cultural and Fraternal Association
- Traditional Chinese: 中華回教博愛社
- Simplified Chinese: 中华回教博爱社
Transcriptions
Standard Mandarin
- Hanyu Pinyin: Zhōnghuá Huíjiào Bó'ài Shè
Yue: Cantonese
- Jyutping: zung1 waa4 wui4 gaau3 bok3 oi3 se5

The Chinese Muslim Cultural and Fraternal Association (CMCFA; Chinese: 中華回教博愛社) is an Islamic organisation in Hong Kong. The group currently operates five different schools in Hong Kong.

The head office is in 7 Chan Tong Lane, Wan Chai.

== History ==
The association was founded in 1918 and acquired the current site at 7 Chan Tong Lane in 1922. It was then incorporated as a charity organisation in 1963.

== Activities ==
The association not only conduct religious activities related to the Chinese Muslims, but they also manage and maintain six non-profit schools: one college, two primary schools and three kindergartens.

== See also ==
- Islam in China
- Islam in Hong Kong
