= Sri Lanka Cricket Combined XI =

Personnel
- Captain: Hans Fernando

Team information
- Founded: 2010

History
- IP T20 wins: none

Sri Lanka Cricket Combined XI was a Sri Lankan Twenty20 cricket team. The team was established in 2010 and featured only in the 2009–10 Inter-Provincial Twenty20 of the Inter-Provincial Twenty20, in which they came last. The team was captained by Hans Fernando.

== Players ==
=== Notable players ===
- Andri Berenger
- Bhanuka Rajapaksa
- Demintha Dahanayake
- Dhanushka Gunathilleke
- Rumesh Buddika
- Sanjaya Fernando

== Honours ==
=== Domestic ===
==== Twenty20 ====
- Inter-Provincial Twenty20: 0
