= Imesh Udayanga =

Sri Lankan cricketer (born 1990)

Personal information
- Born: 14 January 1990 (age 36); Balapitiya, Sri Lanka
Medal record
Men's Cricket
Representing Sri Lanka
South Asian Games
Silver medal – second place	2010 Dhaka	Team
- Source: Cricinfo, 30 January 2016

Imesh Udayanga (born 14 January 1990) is a Sri Lankan first-class cricketer who plays for Badureliya Sports Club.
