= Demintha Dahanayake =

Sri Lankan cricketer (born 1986)

Demintha Dahanayake (born 19 September 1986) is a Sri Lankan cricketer. He is a right-handed batsman and right-arm off-break bowler who plays for Saracens Sports Club. He was born in Kandy.

Dahanayake made his cricketing debut for Nondescripts in the 2006 Under-23 Tournament, a tournament in which he has participated in each season to 2009.

Dahanayake made his List A debut for the senior side during the 2008-09 Premier Limited Overs Tournament, against Bloomfield Cricket and Athletic Club.

Dahanayake's first-class debut came during the 2009–10 season, against Saracens Sports Club. From the upper order, he scored a duck in the only innings in which he batted.
