= Jeevantha Kulatunga =

Sri Lankan cricketer

Personal information
- Full name: Hettiarachchi Gamage Jeevantha Mahesh Kulatunga
- Born: 2 November 1973 (age 53); Kurunegala, Sri Lanka
- Height: 5 ft 11 in (1.80 m)
- Batting: Right-handed
- Bowling: Right-arm medium
- Role: Batsman

International information
- National side: Sri Lanka
- T20I debut (cap 21): 10 October 2008 v Zimbabwe
- Last T20I: 12 October 2008 v Canada

Domestic team information
- Years: Team
- 1993–: Colts Cricket Club
- 1990–1995: North Western Province
- 2007–: Wayamba
- 2011: Drumpellier Cricket Club (Overseas Professional)

Career statistics
Competition	T20I
Matches	2
Runs scored	19
Batting average	9.50
100s/50s	0/0
Top score	11
Balls bowled	–
Wickets	–
Bowling average	–
5 wickets in innings	–
10 wickets in match	–
Best bowling	–
Catches/stumpings	2/–
- Source: Cricinfo, 15 September 2016

Hettiarachchi Gamage Jeevantha Mahesh Kulatunga (born 2 November 1973), or Jeevantha Kulatunga is a former Sri Lankan T20I cricketer. An aggressive right-handed middle order batsman, Kulatunga has been captain of Colts Cricket Club since 2003–2004, though he failed to make an impact at international level.

He is a past student of Maliyadeva College, Kurunegala. He is also a member of 2007 Hong Kong Cricket Sixes winning Sri Lanka team.

== Domestic career ==
Born in Kurunegala, Kulatunga was 17 when he made his first class debut in 1990, playing for Kurunegala Youth Cricket Club. In 2001 he was selected to represent the Sri Lanka Board President's XI in a game against England at Matara, scoring a half century. He has also played for Sri Lanka A, in games against Pakistan A and India.

He has been a prolific scorer in domestic cricket and in May steered his club Wayamba to a 31-run victory in the inaugural Inter-Provincial Twenty20 final against Ruhuna, earning an opportunity to make his international debut. He has also played for Barisal Blazers in Bangladesh's NCL T20 Bangladesh.

== International career ==
In October 2008, Kulatunga was selected in the Sri Lanka side for an International Twenty20 tournament in Toronto. He made his debut on 20 October against Zimbabwe, scoring eight runs and taking a catch in a five-wicket victory, also playing against Canada.

== Fixing allegations ==
Jeevantha Kulatunga was suspected by Al Jazeera along with Dilhara Lokuhettige for being involved in a match fixing in a fake T20 series in the United Arab Emirates. However, in a latest release on 28 May 2018, Jeevantha Kulatunga has declined the allegations made by Al Jazeera, stating that this is a planned action against him in order to damage his reputation.

The Al Jazeera's Investigation Unit also revealed that former Pakistani cricketer Hasan Raza, Jeevantha Kulatunga and Dilhara Lokuhettige were preparing to make money by organising and arranging a fake tournament in the UAE solely to make huge collection of money to fix matches in the future.
